= List of Southland episodes =

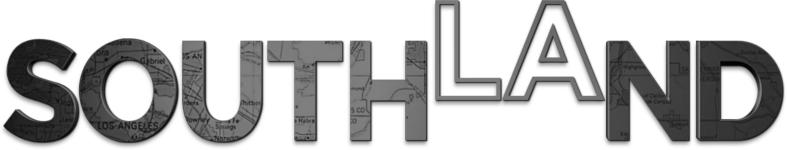

Southland is an American television drama series created by Ann Biderman. It began airing on NBC on April 9, 2009. NBC announced that Southland had been renewed for a second season with an initial 13-episode order to begin airing on Friday, September 25, 2009, at 9:00 pm, one hour earlier than its original Thursday time slot. Shortly before its scheduled premiere, NBC moved the opening of its second season to October 23, 2009, citing the need to promote the show more fully. On October 8, 2009, just two weeks prior to the scheduled premiere, NBC announced that the series had been canceled.

On November 2, 2009, TNT announced it has purchased the rights to Southland's original seven episodes, as well as six completed episodes of what would have been its second season. Southland began airing its second season on March 2, 2010. On April 26, 2010, the network ordered 10 episodes for its third season, which began airing on January 4, 2011. A fourth season was ordered on March 22, 2011, which premiered on January 17, 2012. The fifth season premiered on February 13, 2013.

On May 10, 2013, TNT announced that Southland had been canceled after five seasons.

== Series overview ==
Season	Episodes	Originally released		
Season	Episodes	First released	Last released	Network
1	7	April 9, 2009	May 21, 2009	NBC
2	6	March 2, 2010	April 6, 2010	TNT
3	10	January 4, 2011	March 8, 2011	TNT
4	10	January 17, 2012	March 20, 2012	TNT
5	10	February 13, 2013	April 17, 2013	TNT

== Episodes ==
=== Season 1 (2009) ===
No. overall	No. in season	Title	Directed by	Written by	Original release date	Prod. code	US viewers (millions)
1	1	"Unknown Trouble"	Christopher Chulack	Ann Biderman	April 9, 2009	276046	9.86
Seasoned police officer John Cooper and his rookie trainee Ben Sherman go on watch for Sherman's first day as an LAPD officer, leading Sherman to question whether or not he has what it takes to become a police officer. Meanwhile, homicide detectives Lydia Adams and Russell Clarke race against the clock in the search for a missing girl who may have been abducted. Southeast Division gang squad detectives Nate Moretta and Sammy Bryant hunt for a witness after an innocent 15-year-old victim (Carlos Knight) is gunned down in a drive-by shooting. One of the witnesses, a teenage girl named Janila (Carla Jeffery), seems unafraid to aid in their investigation, even though her cooperation might prove dangerous. Her information leads to a raid by Sherman and Cooper, alongside Officer Bill "Dewey" Dudek (C. Thomas Howell) and his partner, Chickie Brown (Arija Bareikis), culminating in a shooting when Ben is led to use deadly force against an armed suspect to save Dewey's life.
2	2	"Mozambique"	Nelson McCormick	Ann Biderman	April 16, 2009	3X5051	9.58
When officers John Cooper, Ben Sherman and Chickie Brown rescue a baby boy found crawling across the middle of a busy Hollywood street, the hunt for his mother begins. Detective Lydia Adams finds herself affected by the search, taking a personal interest in reuniting the baby with his mother. Detectives Sammy Bryant and Nate Moretta are unable to find the financial resources to put a juvenile witness in police protection after an attempt on her life and must now convince the District Attorney to place her in a student police program. And back at the station, everyone gathers for a retirement party for Officer Dewey. Meanwhile, both Detectives Sammy Bryant and "Sal" Salinger struggle with their marriages.
3	3	"See the Woman"	Christopher Chulack	Ann Biderman	April 23, 2009	3X5052	8.40
Ben reveals details of his past to the department therapist and to his partner, John, making the motivation behind his decision to be a cop clear. Elsewhere, Dewey causes a rift in his relationship with his partner when he becomes star struck by Timmy Davis (Tom Sizemore), a famous, self-obsessed actor. When Dewey loses track of the actor, Chickie finds herself questioning her decision to take him on as her partner. Meanwhile, Russell gets sentimentally close to the sister of a rape victim.
4	4	"Sally in the Alley"	Christopher Chulack	Angela Amato Velez & Ann Biderman	April 30, 2009	3X5054	6.68
Gang detectives Sammy Bryant and Nate Moretta have their work cut out for them when an unidentified female is found dead in the middle of a Los Angeles alley, with her body being used for target practice by young gang members. The tension mounts for Nate when his little sister disappears, revealing a secret from his past that blindsides Sammy. Meanwhile, Russell is offended by Lydia’s suggestion that he has been too personal during a consult with a victim’s sister.
5	5	"Two Gangs"	Nelson McCormick	Dee Johnson	May 7, 2009	3X5053	6.50
After a car accident involving alcohol, Detective Salinger has his gun stolen by gang members in South Central. Sammy and Nate assist in the search for the weapon without calling it in, only to discover the gang in question is equipped with enough assault weapons, bullet-proof vests and military tactics to become a powerful urban street army. Elsewhere, still preoccupied with her personal life, Lydia is caught off guard when a man surprises her outside her home.
6	6	"Westside"	Nelson McCormick	Story by : Ann Biderman; Teleplay by : Angela Amato Velez & Dee Johnson	May 14, 2009	3X5055	4.64
Lydia and Russell investigate jewelry thieves who have been violently robbing homes in Bel Air. Ben discovers that he knows one of the home invasion victims and finds himself breaking police policy by becoming personally involved. Gang detective Sammy Bryant decides to ensure the safety of a key witness (Carla Jeffery) in a gangland trial by taking her to his home.
7	7	"Derailed"	Christopher Chulack	Ann Biderman	May 21, 2009	3X5056	6.39
The day takes a turn for the worse when Officers Cooper, Sherman, Brown and Dewey find a gang member dead in a trunk outside Dodger Stadium. Meanwhile, Sammy convinces Lydia to take in Janila in order to ensure her safety. Sal becomes increasingly frustrated with his growing rift with his teenage daughter Kimmy (Annamarie Kenoyer). Russell is shot and badly wounded while trying to solve a dispute with his neighbors. Dewey gets turned in because his alcoholism begins to affect his work and gets injured when he flips the car and also injures Brown.

=== Season 2 (2010) ===
No. overall	No. in season	Title	Directed by	Written by	Original release date	Prod. code	US viewers (millions)
8	1	"Phase Three"	Christopher Chulack	Ann Biderman & John Wells	March 2, 2010	3X5753	2.50
Detective Lydia Adams has to adjust to life with a new partner, Rene Cordero (Amaury Nolasco), as they investigate the kidnapping of an elderly man, while Detective Russell Clarke is hospitalized. Chickie Brown ends up in a mini-riot when her new partner, Officer "Slug" Ferguson, accidentally shoots at an unarmed joyriding suspect.
9	2	"Butch and Sundance"	Nelson McCormick	Robin Green & Mitchell Burgess	March 9, 2010	3X5751	2.06
John and Ben are the first responders to a triple homicide in Hancock Park, where a mother (Judy Clement) is bludgeoned to death and her two daughters (Skyler Day and Lizze Broadway) are found bound, gagged, raped, and killed. A reluctant Det. Salinger allows Sammy and Nate to join an operation to take down a drug kingpin.
10	3	"U-Boat"	Christopher Chulack	Ann Biderman	March 16, 2010	3X5752	1.86
When Officer Chickie Brown is assigned office duties in the aftermath of her reporting Dewey for alcoholism, Cooper offers to take her on patrol with him. He observes her making mistakes and has to tell her she no longer has a commanding street presence and should consider other types of police work. Ben Sherman goes on patrol alone for the first time. He manages to locate a missing autistic child but is unable to prevent the murder of a woman being stalked.
11	4	"The Runner"	Guy Ferland	Diana Son	March 23, 2010	3X5754	2.28
Lydia and her new partner, Ray Suarez (Clifton Collins, Jr.), arrive in South Central, where a young SULA student/track star was murdered. Suspicion is placed on a SULA football star. Ben and John visit Dewey in rehab and attend a former police officer's funeral in Indian Wells.
12	5	"What Makes Sammy Run?"	Felix Alcalá	Cheo Hodari Coker	March 30, 2010	3X5755	2.07
Two gangbangers are killed when gangsters open fire in a crowded night club and the shootings are connected to Moretta's daughter. Tensions rise between Det. Salinger and Det. Puente (Laz Alonso) on the gang task force. Marital problems are exacerbated when Sammy Bryant learns Tammi has been photographing gang members as he tries to prevent a young boy from destroying his life by joining a gang.
13	6	"Maximum Deployment"	J. Michael Muro	David Graziano	April 6, 2010	3X5756	2.07
Officers Cooper, Sherman and Brown are dispatched as part of a maximum deployment to catch a rapist who is impersonating a police officer. Det. Clarke returns as Lydia's partner to investigate a double homicide. Det. Salinger's wife, Captain Susan Salinger (Denise Crosby), learns of his affair with television reporter Mia Sanchez (Lisa Vidal) through his daughter.

=== Season 3 (2011) ===
No. overall	No. in season	Title	Directed by	Written by	Original release date	Prod. code	US viewers (millions)
14	1	"Let It Snow"	Christopher Chulack	Ann Biderman and John Wells	January 4, 2011	3X6151	2.11
Lydia adjusts to having yet another new partner, Det. Josie Ochoa (Jenny Gago), while her old partner, Russell, deals with having a desk job at the station. The detectives' first case together is of a missing woman who had been assaulted at work and they must find the rapist who was responsible. On patrol, John and Ben respond to an officer down call and wind up in a shoot-out in the middle of the street. Nate and Sammy investigate a double homicide where a local gang leader, Luis Reyes (Emilio Rivera) may be involved.
15	2	"Punching Water"	Christopher Chulack	Cheo Hodari Coker	January 11, 2011	3X6152	1.64
Shorthanded on detectives, Det. Salinger brings in Lydia and Josie to help Sammy and Nate solve a series of gang-related murders. When a 4-year-old boy gets in the cross-hairs of a drive by shooting, the whole of Southeast Division is out looking for the gang member who shot him. This crime leaves some of the officers questioning why they became cops in the first place, leading Sal to note, "Fighting gang crime is like punching water. No matter how hard you hit, you can't seem to leave a dent." Dewey returns and preaches about being free of alcohol, but his disruptive attitude returns while on patrol.
16	3	"Discretion"	Nelson McCormick	Jonathan Lisco	January 18, 2011	3X6153	2.11
Ben seeks revenge on his mother's rapist, David Morgan (Matt Eyde) when he is released from prison, but is reprimanded by Sgt. Hill (Jamie McShane) for putting the force at risk when Morgan makes a complaint against him. Lydia and Josie clash over a case involving a bloody chainsaw and wonder if they'll be partners any longer. Sammy deals with Tammi's betrayal by staying at Nate's house and constantly arguing over the phone with her. Russell asks his old partner for a loan after his wife Dina froze their accounts to protect their marital assets.
17	4	"Code 4"	Felix Alcalá	Story by : Diana Son and Will Rokos; Teleplay by : Will Rokos	January 25, 2011	3X6154	2.20
Detective Adams investigates the murder of a drug dealer and finds out the man's own nephew may be involved. Ben starts believing too much in his abilities and John has teach him the consequence of his actions. Tammi tries to get a restraining order against Sammy and refuses a DNA test on her unborn child. Later, Nate and Sammy drive by a local gang party, and the situation gets out of control when Moretta is hit in the back of the head and killed.
18	5	"The Winds"	Christopher Chulack	Story by : Robin Green & Mitchell Burgess & Healther Zuhlke; Teleplay by : Heather Zuhlke	February 1, 2011	3X6155	1.82
The Santa Ana winds keep everyone on edge, as they recover from the loss of Detective Nate Moretta. Lydia and Josie clash while investigating a complicated rape case involving a rich married couple on the Westside. John bonds with a child abandoned by his parents while preparing to testify at his father's parole hearing.
19	6	"Cop or Not"	J. Michael Muro	Cheo Hodari Coker	February 8, 2011	3X6156	1.80
A celebrity is murdered and her husband is a suspect, with Adams, Ochoa, and Russell coming to the case. John becomes frustrated with having to spend the entire day directing traffic outside the victim's house. Sammy goes back on the street as a patrol officer and, as he tells Sal, it becomes clear he wishes to avenge his partner's death. Lydia's integrity comes into question when photos of the celebrity's crime scene are leaked to the press. John disobeys his commander's assignment to the celebrity murder and takes another radio call-out, with surprising consequences.
20	7	"Sideways"	Allison Anders	Jonathan Lisco	February 15, 2011	3X6157	1.98
While suspended over the leaked crime scene photos, Lydia bonds with a man slowly dying of injuries sustained when he witnessed a shootout. Sammy worries that his relationship with Nate's widow has become too close. Cooper's frustrations over an abandoned trailer that's become a haven for drug users and prostitutes leads him to take direct action. Sammy is unable to identify a suspect in Nate's murder and turns to Tammi for comfort. Chickie is haunted by a high-speed chase when Dewey accidentally hits a pedestrian. Russell confesses to Lydia that he sold the photos and she breaks off her friendship with him.
21	8	"Fixing a Hole"	Christopher Chulack	Story by : Will Rokos; Teleplay by : Cheo Hodari Coker	February 22, 2011	3X6158	2.05
Lydia and Josie have their hands full while watching an important witness before a murder trial. John and Ben help a malnourished boy believed to be abused by a neighborhood child molester. Sammy tracks down Nate's killer and plans to take him to the desert. But when he gets back, Nate's wife Mariella (Yara Martinez) decides to leave town for good.
22	9	"Failure Drill"	J. Michael Muro	Story by : Jonathan Lisco & Chitra Elizabeth Sampath; Teleplay by : Chitra Elizabeth Sampath	March 1, 2011	3X6159	1.85
Cooper's back problems continue to worsen and begin to interfere with his job performance to Ben's anger and concern. Adams and Ochoa are assigned to a murder case where a family becomes caught in the crossfire of the investigation. Later in the day, they are confronted with a mad gunman on a rampage in a factory. Lydia begins dating again, but an awkward discovery about her date is made.
23	10	"Graduation Day"	Christopher Chulack	Story by : Heather Zuhlke; Teleplay by : John Wells	March 8, 2011	3X6160	2.35
Ben faces his final day of probation and has to deal with Cooper's addiction to painkillers. Adams and Ochoa try to track down a sexual deviant who fled from his van following a pursuit and collision. Ochoa finds out that Adams has begun dating her son (Maurice Compte), a patrol officer 8 years her junior, making her question if she can continue to work with Adams. Sammy is assigned a new partner, Det. Gil Puente (Laz Alonso) and questions his future as a gang crime detective in the LAPD when a warrant is issued for Nate's killer. After seeing the birth of his son, Sammy asks Sal to transfer him to patrol so he can help train new officers. In the end, Sammy and Ben become partners.

=== Season 4 (2012) ===
No. overall	No. in season	Title	Directed by	Written by	Original release date	Prod. code	US viewers (millions)
24	1	"Wednesday"	Christopher Chulack	Jonathan Lisco	January 17, 2012	3X6701	1.76
John Cooper returns to patrol after having back surgery and is paired up with Officer Jessica Tang (Lucy Liu). They respond to a runaway vehicle and a suicide attempt at a factory. Ben and Sammy pursue gang members in the midst of a shootout through a neighborhood and school, and Ben takes issue with the way the crime scene is handled by Officer Danny Ferguson (Lou Diamond Phillips). Later, Ben is in foot pursuit of an attempted rape suspect when the suspect is hit by a truck. Ben and Danny debate giving first aid to the suspect. Lydia has a former confidential informant show up requesting to be relocated. Lydia takes no pity on her circumstances and tells her to return to Lancaster. The informant is later found dead at the beach. A man walks into the police station with a gun and the ensuing shootout leaves Ferguson and other officers wounded.
25	2	"Underwater"	Nelson McCormick	Cheo Hodari Coker	January 24, 2012	3X6702	2.17
Tang and Cooper’s past physical problems are put to the test when they are attacked by a perp on the street. Lydia and Ruben (Dorian Missick) investigate a convenience store murder, and Lydia uses her typical compassionate charm to collect facts on her suspect from an unassuming grandmother (Marla Gibbs). Ben and Sammy ride with another officer who is prone to small mistakes. Joel Rucker (Carl Lumbly) takes over as the new captain.
26	3	"Community"	Felix Alcalá	Jason Horwitch	January 31, 2012	3X6703	2.11
It's Hood Day on the streets of Los Angeles, and Captain Rucker has the department playing hall monitors. Sammy lets old grudges die hard when he leaves a gang territory unattended, only to have a violent gang war erupt throughout the city. Ben's recent mistake continues to haunt him everywhere he goes. Ruben practices his speech for his daughter's quinceañera in the midst of a murder investigation. Cooper and Tang investigate a robbery in a strict Orthodox Jewish home, leading Tang to reveal parts of her past.
27	4	"Identity"	Nelson McCormick	Sara Gran	February 7, 2012	3X6704	1.54
Tang tries to help a homeless vet get an ID so he will be admitted to a homeless shelter. The situation opens John's eyes to his partner's past. Sammy is determined to save a dog after he accidentally shoots it in the leg. Lydia and Ruben investigate the murder of a man who lent a helping hand to women in need. Ben and Lydia each face big life changes.
28	5	"Legacy"	J. Michael Muro	Heather Zuhlke	February 14, 2012	3X6705	1.89
John tries to save a suicidal teen in a situation that hits extremely close to home. Sammy convinces a former addict to be an informant, with devastating consequences. Tang gets a visit from someone in her past. Lydia and Ruben investigate a supposed home invasion that appears to have been staged to cover up murder.
29	6	"Integrity Check"	Christopher Chulack	Jonathan Lisco	February 21, 2012	3X6706	1.64
Sammy tries to make amends after the murder of a young man who agreed to testify in one of his cases. John and Tang find themselves babysitting a documentary film crew. Lydia is ordered to put on her uniform and serve as shift supervisor for the day, but the job could be more than her body is able to handle.
30	7	"Fallout"	Allison Anders	Etan Frankel	February 28, 2012	3X6707	1.90
Things just go from bad to worse when Jessica is served legal papers in the morning and involved in a shooting in the evening. Sammy holds a grudge against Ben for not backing him up over drug evidence that may have been planted during an arrest. Lydia comes to a decision about her situation.
31	8	"God's Work"	Guy Norman Bee	Cheo Hodari Coker	March 6, 2012	3X6708	1.96
Lydia and Ruben investigate the death of a young nanny, but first they have to find the kids who were in her care. Ben tries to intervene in the life of a prostitute with a daughter, but his efforts only make things worse. And while Tang gets an update about the boy she shot, John still wants her to come clean about what really happened.
32	9	"Risk"	J. Michael Muro	Jason Horwitch	March 13, 2012	3X6709	1.76
Ben's day goes from bad to worse as past actions come back to haunt him. Cooper and Tang are called in by FID again and Adams finds herself caught in an extremely dangerous situation that may have more of an effect on her than first thought.
33	10	"Thursday"	Christopher Chulack	Jonathan Lisco	March 20, 2012	3X6710	1.69
Cooper saves Tang from getting shot and Tang is promoted to Sergeant and watch commander.

=== Season 5 (2013) ===
No. overall	No. in season	Title	Directed by	Written by	Original release date	Prod. code	US viewers (millions)
34	1	"Hats and Bats"	Christopher Chulack	Jonathan Lisco	February 13, 2013	3X7551	1.16
Ideals clash when John Cooper trains a new rookie, a military veteran who served in Afghanistan. Detective Lydia Adams struggles to care for her newborn while maintaining a grip on her job, leaving Christopher in her mother's hands while she contemplates informing the father of his baby's birth. Officer Sammy Bryant continues his custody battle over his son Nate with his ex-wife, who is increasingly looking to frame Sammy as an abusive and harassing father unfit for custody. Officer Ben Sherman is awarded the medal of valor under dubious circumstances, and lets the commendation go to his head while on the job.
35	2	"Heat"	Daniel Sackheim	Heather Zuhlke	February 20, 2013	3X7552	1.21
Tensions are high after a suspected drive-by shooting wounds Officer David Mendoza. Because Mendoza had protected him from disciplinary action after a drunken night, Ben is committed to take justice into his own hands even if ethics are thrown out and lives are put at risk. John Cooper and his new trainee continue to clash on what it means to wear the uniform of LAPD, until a seemingly routine traffic stop finally settles things. Lydia Adams investigates the death of a man whose body is found in the mountains, and immediately suspects the man's wife, a professional boxer. An unforeseen tragedy hits home for one of LAPD's own just as things were starting to look better.
36	3	"Babel"	J. Michael Muro	Aaron Rahsaan Thomas	February 27, 2013	3X7553	1.18
Faced with the recent and sudden departure of his latest rookie officer, Officer John Cooper refuses to train a new boot. He is paired with Officer Henry Lucero, a veteran officer whose methods clash with Cooper's. The dispatch center goes down, resulting in heavily delayed response times. Sammy tries to talk to his ex-wife, resulting in a confrontation and a subsequent complaint to Internal Affairs. Sammy and Ben respond to a mass shooting at a local community center when a white supremacist opens fire on an ESL class. Lydia plans her mother's funeral while getting her life in order. She also tries to get in contact with an old love.
37	4	"Under the Big Top"	Felix Alcalá	Sara Gran	March 6, 2013	3X7554	1.51
Sammy faces a financial crisis when a court evaluator decides he needs to make several expensive renovations in order to keep his child. Temptation arises when he and Ben chase a bank robber by car and then into the subway. Lydia and Ruben find themselves investigating a missing persons case when a body is discovered dissolved in acid, but the case may not be all that it appears. The father of Lydia’s son insists on being a part of his child's life, resulting in a major headache for her. John Cooper and his partner Henry find themselves on the receiving end of some very strange calls.
38	5	"Off Duty"	Regina King	Zack Whedon	March 13, 2013	3X7555	1.72
Officer Sammy Bryant has to take a second job working private security for a celebrity to make ends meet, but ends up becoming a tabloid celebrity himself with unwanted paparazzi attention after going beyond the call of duty. John Cooper begins to think about what life will hold for him once he leaves the LAPD as he responds to a call which could place his surgically repaired back in danger. Lydia Adams goes to Phoenix in order to convince a death row inmate to tell her the locations of several bodies in murders he is suspected of. Officer "Dewey" Dudek suffers a heart attack during a foot pursuit which lands him in the hospital. Officer Ben Sherman helps the drug squad nab a major dealer by turning in his unsuspecting former high school acquaintance, a dealer. As the accolades and praise pile up and he grows increasingly frustrated with the lack of change on the streets, Ben contemplates taking the detective exam.
39	6	"Bleed Out"	Christopher Chulack	Chad Feehan	March 20, 2013	3X7556	1.45
Lydia and Ruben investigate the suspicious death of an infant. Sammy begins to grow detached and unfocused under the weight of the investigation of his ex-wife’s report that he assaulted her.
40	7	"Heroes"	J. Michael Muro	Heather Zuhlke	March 27, 2013	3X7557	1.32
John Cooper takes drastic measures to save his former training officer, Hicks, from his own alcoholism. Upon reporting for work, John is confronted by a priest who attempts to convince him to visit his dying father in prison, a request he steadfastly refuses. Lydia Adams searches for a dead John Doe killed during a robbery, and contemplates having her child's recently divorced father share parenting duties. Sammy's lie to IA about not being in possession of a video camera with footage of his altercation with Tammy weighs heavily on his conscience, resulting in an angry outburst. Ben's relationship with his new girlfriend Elena grows more serious, and he wonders if Sammy will come clean to IA and throw him under the bus after Ben lied to protect him.
41	8	"The Felix Paradox"	Stephen Cragg	Aaron Rahsaan Thomas	April 3, 2013	3X7558	1.46
The funeral of a major drug dealer brings gangsters of all kinds out of the woodwork. Ben Sherman breaks up with the teacher he's been dating after meeting her parents. He doesn't like the fact that they're privileged rich people and just because she works at an inner-city school doesn't mean she really understands. Lydia and her partner Ruben Robinson investigate the drug related murder of Sgt. Hill’s son. They discover police corruption in the process and clash over how to handle it, eventually turning it over to I.A. When Ben and Sammy find a little girl away from home and take her back there, they find a lot of drugs. Five guys show up, angry that the cops entered the house, and threaten to do the same to them. Ben suspects that Sammy did not destroy the tape of his altercation with Tammi and decides to take matters into his own hands. He has Elena’s brother break into Sammy's house to steal the tape and make it look like robbery and vandalism by the guys from the drug house earlier that day. The babysitter who was home with Sammy's son was injured in the robbery. After Cooper's partner Henry is grazed by a bullet, they go to eat at his wife's restaurant. Cooper learns that Henry is separated from his wife and hasn't seen his family in 18 months despite telling everyone that he goes home to them every day. John sinks further into his loneliness. He tells his ex-wife that he wants to have a baby with her to raise together although it wouldn't be a romantic relationship.
42	9	"Chaos"	Christopher Chulack	Zack Whedon	April 10, 2013	3X7559	1.59
Fed up with Lucero's continued homophobic remarks, Cooper invites him to have a beer and takes him to a gay bar. He reveals his sexuality and tells Lucero to cut it out. Lucero goes from being apologetic to being even more insulting, starting a fight with Cooper which he loses and ends the night spewing insults. The next day a distress call leads them to an abandoned building where Lucero screws up while arresting a meth-head. Another addict knocks him out, and he and Cooper are abducted and taken to a desolate location. The kidnappers focus their paranoid fury on Lucero by beating and torturing him. After one of the kidnappers freaks out and shoots Lucero in the head, both flee when Cooper tries to save his own life. The cops eventually find the location after several dead ends and Cooper reels in shock from the events of the last 24 hours.
43	10	"Reckoning"	Christopher Chulack	Jonathan Lisco	April 17, 2013	3X7560	1.83
Sammy closes in on the real robber of his house. Ben makes his girlfriend's brother who broke into Sammy's house leave town. He has the brother’s car towed so the helicopter patrol won't spot it. Sammy finds the tow records and confronts Ben who admits what he did but justifies it by saying he lied for Sammy but then Sammy wouldn't destroy the tape. They get into a physical altercation and Sammy says they’re no longer partners. Lydia and Ruben continue to pursue John’s kidnappers. They eventually corner him and the SWAT team kills the suspect when he won't surrender. Lydia's personal relationship with her former partner Russell grows. Ben's ex-girlfriend shows up at Elena’s house, which she found by installing a location tracker on his phone. John copes with the aftermath of the kidnapping, but doesn't want to admit he's having a difficult time. It doesn't help when his ex-wife, with whom he has been staying since the kidnapping, tells him she no longer wants to have a child with him. All the stress comes to a head when the neighbors he suspects of growing marijuana call him a pig for turning off their noisy generator. He disarms one of them and uses the gun to beat the other one. The police arrive and shoot him when he stands up, gun in his hand at his side. The episode fades out before it is known if John lives or dies.

== Ratings ==
Southland : U.S. viewers per episode (millions)

Season	Episode number									
Season	1	2	3	4	5	6	7	8	9	10
1	9.86	9.58	8.40	6.68	6.50	4.64	6.39	–		
2	2.50	2.06	1.86	2.28	2.07	2.07	–			
3	2.11	1.64	2.11	2.20	1.82	1.80	1.98	2.05	1.85	2.35
4	1.76	2.17	2.11	1.54	1.89	1.64	1.90	1.96	1.76	1.69
5	1.16	1.21	1.18	1.51	1.72	1.45	1.32	1.46	1.59	1.83

Audience measurement performed by Nielsen Media Research
