= Ellie MacDowall =

Scottish actress

- Born: Edinburgh
- Education: The MGA Academy of Performing Arts, Edinburgh
- Occupation: Actress
- Television: Archie

Ellie MacDowall is a Scottish actress.

== Early life ==
Born in Edinburgh, she graduated in 2020 from The MGA Academy of Performing Arts in Edinburgh, where she studied dance for commercial performance.

== Career ==
Her first professional acting role was at the age of eleven years-old when she was cast in the stage play of Evita as a child soloist at Evita’s funeral on the Edinburgh leg of a UK tour of the production.

MacDowall was in the short films, Mohihi (2021) and The Proposal (2022). In 2023, MacDowall plays Jennifer Grant, the daughter of Hollywood icon Cary Grant in the 2023 ITVX miniseries Archie alongside Jason Isaacs in the titular role.

MacDowall was a presenter at the 2023 British Academy Scotland Awards in Glasgow in November 2023.

== Personal life ==
In early 2023, MacDowall's relationship with Scottish singer-songwriter Lewis Capaldi was confirmed publicly. The couple had been photographed together the previous November, and attended the 2023 BRIT Awards together in London in February 2023.

== Filmography ==
Year	Title	Role	Notes
2021	Mohini	Brooke	Short film
2022	The Proposal	Emma	Short film
2023	Archie	Jennifer Grant	Mini series
