= Archie (TV series) =

British television serial

- Promotional poster
- Genre: Drama
- Created by: Jeff Pope
- Screenplay by: Jeff Pope
- Directed by: Paul Andrew Williams
- Starring: Jason Isaacs; Kara Tointon; Harriet Walter; Jason Watkins; Calam Lynch; Laura Aikman
- Theme music composer: Lindsay Wright
- Country of origin: United Kingdom
- Original language: English
- No. of series: 1
- No. of episodes: 4

Production
- Executive producers: Jennifer Grant; Dyan Cannon
- Producer: Rebecca Hodgson
- Production companies: ITV Studios; BritBox International

Original release
- Network: ITV
- Release: 23 November – 13 December 2023

Archie is a 2023 British drama television serial about the life of Cary Grant starring Jason Isaacs in the lead role with Kara Tointon, Harriet Walter, Jason Watkins, Calam Lynch and Laura Aikman.

== Synopsis ==
The series depicts the man originally named Archibald Leach, born into poverty in Bristol in 1904, before he became Hollywood's Cary Grant. Scenes set later, in the 1960s, feature Grant in Los Angeles, unhappy despite international stardom and many hit movies.

== Cast ==
- Jason Isaacs as Cary Grant
  - Dainton Anderson as youngest Archie
  - Oaklee Pendergast as young Archie
  - Calam Lynch as Archie
- Harriet Walter as Elsie Leach
  - Kara Tointon as young Elsie
- Henry Lloyd-Hughes as young Elias Leach
- Laura Aikman as Dyan Cannon
- Ian Puleston-Davies as Bob Pender
- Ian McNeice as Alfred Hitchcock
- Jason Watkins as Stanley Fox
- Lisa Faulkner as Dorothy
- Niamh Cusack as Alma Reville
- Lily Travers as Grace Kelly
- Lolly Jones as Mae West
- Stella Stocker as Audrey Hepburn
- Christian Lees as George Burns
- Alexandra Guelff as Doris Day
- Ellie MacDowall as Jennifer Grant
- Laura Ferries as Virginia Cherrill

== Production ==
Despite Grant's Bristol upbringing, and the city of Bristol being the setting for large parts of the series, filming actually took place in the city of Liverpool in the summer of 2022. The four part series is written by Jeff Pope. Filming also took place in Manchester and Cheshire in September 2022. Pope interviewed Grant's daughter Jennifer Grant and Grant's ex-wife Dyan Cannon for the production, and both act as Executive Producers. ITV Studios produced with BritBox International as co-producers, and Paul Andrew Williams as director. In September 2022, Harriet Walter was added to the cast as Grant's mother Elsie Leach, and Calam Lynch, Dainton Anderson and Oaklee Pendergast were added as younger versions of Archie. Additional cast members included Jason Watkins, Lisa Faulkner, Niamh Cusack, Kara Tointon, Laura Aikman, Henry Lloyd-Hughes, Ian Puleston-Davies and Ian McNeice.

== Release ==
The series became available on 23 November 2023 in the UK, on the streaming service ITVX, and was subsequently broadcast on ITV on 29 & 30 December 2024. The series became available in the USA on the 7 December 2023, on the streaming service BritBox.

== Reception ==
According to the review aggregator Rotten Tomatoes, 70% of the 20 reviews are positive.
