= John Cooper (Southland) =

- Michael Cudlitz as Officer John Cooper, shown wearing the rank patch of a Senior Lead Officer.
- First appearance: "Unknown Trouble"
- Last appearance: "Reckoning"
- Created by: Ann Biderman
- Portrayed by: Michael Cudlitz

In-universe information
- Gender: Male
- Occupation: LAPD Senior Lead Officer
- Spouse: Laurie Cooper (divorced)

Officer John Cooper is a fictional character who appears on the American television series Southland. A veteran officer with the Los Angeles Police Department (LAPD), Cooper is a Police Officer III+1, which is a Senior Lead Officer, serving as a field training officer in the Hollywood Division in West Bureau. He is played by Michael Cudlitz.

== Fictional character biography ==
Little is known of Cooper's background. He has said that his father, who taught him to shoot guns, was in and out of prison during Cooper's childhood. His father was incarcerated in 1991 for the rape and murder of Cooper's 16-year-old girlfriend. Cooper attended Susan Miller Dorsey High School. He joined the LAPD in 1992 because it was the only job that someone of his educational level could start out earning $30,000 a year at the time. Cooper was previously married to Laurie, a nurse. They are divorced but remain on friendly terms, although Cooper refused her request to donate sperm for her to conceive a child.

Cooper suffers from chronic back pain, which he attributes to an on-the-job injury. He wears a back brace and self-medicates with pain pills, which he obtains from his ex-wife, drug dealers, and crime scenes he assists in investigating. Cooper has refused to "go through channels" to receive treatment, saying that should he do so he would be taken off the streets and, if he could not work on the streets, he would "rather be dead". He has, however, sought relief through alternative medicine techniques like acupuncture. After finally beginning to understand he has a problem, Cooper decides to quit self-medicating. He soon begins using again, leading to a negative effect on his job performance and an angry confrontation with Sherman. Following his failure to back Sherman up in pursuit of a rape suspect, Sherman tells Cooper to check himself into rehab, or Sherman will advise the watch commander to order Cooper to take a drug test. Season three ends with Ben's taking him to a hospital for a medical detox and back treatment.

Season 4 opens with Cooper's returning to street duty following back surgery and rehabilitation. He is no longer partnered with Ben Sherman but instead with Jessica Tang (Lucy Liu). She is charged with evaluating his fitness for street duty following his medical treatment. They initially work well together and, following an encounter with a suicidal gay teenager, Tang and Cooper have a conversation in which she makes it clear she is aware of his homosexuality and it is not an issue. However, their relationship becomes strained after Tang shoots a teenager wielding what turns out to be a toy gun. Cooper realizes that Tang removed the orange tip from the toy's barrel after the shooting, but he does not give that information during the investigation into the incident. The season ends with Tang's being promoted and moved to a different area division; she gives Cooper the orange tip as a keepsake.

The opening of season 5 sees Cooper returning to his role as a Training Officer, with new trainee Officer Gary Steele (Derek Ray), a military veteran who served in Afghanistan and joined the LAPD because it paid more than other available jobs. When the team comes under fire and Steele fails to return fire, Cooper removes Steele's badge and washes him out. Cooper is next partnered with Officer Henry "Hank" Lucero (Anthony Ruivivar). Their relationship is amicable, although Cooper becomes increasingly weary of Lucero's homophobic remarks. This comes to a head when Cooper takes Lucero to a bar, reveals that it's a gay bar, and comes out to him. Lucero initially insists he is all right with the situation, but outside the bar the men come to blows, and Lucero calls Cooper a "faggot". The next day a routine disturbance call goes terribly wrong and Cooper and Lucero are kidnapped by two drug addicts, who take Cooper's and Lucero's weapons. Lucero is killed, but Cooper escapes. He returns to work 18 days after the incident but is frustrated in his attempts to be returned to full duty.

Cooper's personal life suffers over the course of the season, beginning when Caesar, with whom Cooper has been involved for three years, leaves him when Cooper refuses to discuss making the relationship more formal. He engages in a series of one-night stands and begins drinking more heavily, although he does not relapse into drug use. Elements of his past haunt him. His original Training Officer, Hicks (Gerald McRaney), spirals into alcoholism and suicidal depression to the point where Cooper feels compelled to keep him prisoner in Cooper's house to prevent him from killing himself. John's father reaches out from prison and, when Cooper visits, tells him he would preferred for Cooper to have never existed than turn out homosexual. After initially refusing Laurie's request to have a child with her, Cooper changes his mind. Laurie is at first pleased, but following Cooper's own downward spiral following his ordeal, she tells him she no longer wants to have a baby with him. The series ends with an altercation between Cooper and two of Laurie's neighbors, whom Cooper had had words with earlier in the season. Cooper assaults the men after one calls him a "pig", pistol whipping one severely with the man's own gun. The responding police order Cooper to show his hands and, when they spot the gun, open fire, shooting him twice in his torso.

== Sexuality and continued development ==
John Cooper is gay but apparently closeted to his co-workers. Southland initially dealt with his sexuality obliquely, with the closest he has been shown to coming out being a conversation with his partner/trainee, Officer Ben Sherman. When the two are returning from the funeral of a friend of Cooper's named Clark who committed suicide, Cooper tells Sherman that he and Laurie used to double date Clark and his wife. After Cooper's divorce, he used to see Clark in gay bars and they avoided each other. Other indicators of his sexuality included his frequenting a bar with an all-male clientele (where he picked up another man), and the intimation of an affectionate relationship with a man named Caesar who helped Cooper build a retaining wall in his garden. Caesar was later seen in Cooper's bed. In season 4, his new partner, Officer Jessica Tang, tells Cooper she selected him as her partner because she had heard he would not make unwanted sexual advances toward her. Whether this indicates knowledge of his sexuality is not clear. Her knowledge is clarified following the incident with the suicidal teen, when she advises Cooper of the boy's death and makes it clear that Cooper's sexuality is not an issue for her.

Cudlitz has expressed his surprise that some viewers denied that Cooper is gay, saying that the show "couldn't be any clearer". Cudlitz recognized the significance of his portrayal to the LGBT community but was less concerned about playing a gay character than portraying his character with integrity. "If I play this character honestly, and he’s looking for all the things that most humans are looking for, which is human connection and to find love and to be happy, then I think that I am, by extension, doing the right thing for the gay community...But my focus is not to make any type of groundbreaking gay character. My focus is to make an honest, believable character that the audience can get emotionally invested in".

Following the conclusion of season 3, executive producer Christopher Chulack stated in an interview that future development plans for the character are uncertain. He expressed his hope that Cooper, with the conclusion of his addiction story, will "come back fixed and unencumbered" and return to being an outstanding police officer.

Speaking in advance of season 5, Michael Cudlitz reported that Cooper's stories would increase the focus on his personal life, including his sexuality. "John is healthy, he's a perfectly healthy alpha male. He should be fucking or trying to fuck somebody or something and [the writers] all agreed, everyone was like, 'yep, absolutely'" He indicated that Cooper would explore one-night stands and get into "some stuff he should not be getting himself into relationship-wise". Cooper would also encounter conflicts in his professional life with two new partners and personally in his relationship with his father.

On May 10, 2013, TNT announced that Southland had been canceled.

== Critical reception ==
Officer Cooper has been described as "the pained heart of the series. He is a man in constant agony, not only from the physical pain of his back problems, but the emotional pain of his broken marriage, as well. Cudlitz has been lauded for his portrayal, with attention paid to how the character's homosexuality is presented.

Michael Cudlitz received a 2013 Critics' Choice Television Award for Best Supporting Actor in a Drama Series.
