= Sara Gran =

American author (born 1971)

- Born: 1971 (age 54–55); New York City, U.S.
- Citizenship: United States
- Occupation: Author
- Writing career
- Language: English
- Genre: Crime fiction

Sara Gran (born 1971) is an American author.

== Career ==
Gran is the author of seven novels, including Come Closer and Dope. Her novel Claire DeWitt and the City of the Dead was the first in a series; it won the 2012 Macavity Award for Best Novel. Her third Claire DeWitt novel, The Infinite Blacktop, was published on September 18, 2018.

Gran started the small press Dreamland Books.

Gran has written scripts for the TNT show Southland and two other series, Chance and Berlin Station. She is also developing an adaptation of Corinne May Botz's novel Nutshell Studies of Unexplained Death with director/producer Guillermo del Toro.

Gran is also the author of the eight-episode Audible Original audiodrama Marigold released in 2021.

== Bibliography ==
| Year | Title | Publisher | Note |
|---|---|---|---|
| 2001 | Saturn's Return to New York | Soho Press | Re-released 2019 |
| 2003 | Come Closer | Soho Press | |
| 2006 | Dope | G. P. Putnam's Sons | |
| 2011 | Claire DeWitt and the City of the Dead | Houghton Mifflin Harcourt | |
| 2013 | Claire DeWitt and the Bohemian Highway | Houghton Mifflin Harcourt | |
| 2018 | The Infinite Blacktop | Atria Books | Claire DeWitt novel |
| 2022 | The Book of the Most Precious Substance | Dreamland Books | |
| 2025 | Little Mysteries | Dreamland Books | Short Story Collection |

== Adaptations ==
A number of Gran's novels have come to the attention of the film and television industry. Her 2003 novel Come Closer was looked at by director Carter Smith although, as of October 2012, nothing has yet been released. The same applies to her 2006 novel Dope, which had actress Julianne Moore slated for the lead role, although no episodes have yet been released.
