= American Dreamer (1984 film) =

1984 film by Rick Rosenthal

- Theatrical release poster
- Directed by: Rick Rosenthal
- Screenplay by: David Greenwalt; Jim Kouf
- Story by: Ann Biderman
- Produced by: Doug Chapin
- Starring: JoBeth Williams; Tom Conti; Giancarlo Giannini
- Cinematography: Jan de Bont; Giuseppe Rotunno
- Edited by: Anne Goursaud
- Music by: Lewis Furey
- Production company: CBS Theatrical Films
- Distributed by: Warner Bros. Pictures
- Release date: October 26, 1984
- Running time: 105 minutes
- Country: United States
- Language: English
- Budget: $10 million
- Box office: $5 million (US)

American Dreamer is a 1984 American romantic comedy-thriller film directed by Rick Rosenthal from a script by Ann Biderman, David Greenwalt and Jim Kouf. It stars JoBeth Williams and Tom Conti.

The film follows American housewife Cathy Palmer (Williams) who wins a trip to Paris in a mystery-writing contest. She loses her memory when she is hit by a motorist, and begins acting as if she were Rebecca Ryan, the female detective in her story.

== Plot ==
A voice over says, "No, that's not right." The scenario is repeated with adjustments until the voice is eventually satisfied. The screen fades to Cathy Palmer sitting at a typewriter, finishing up the story. She seals it in an envelope and sends it off. When Kevin, her conventional, self-centered husband, comes home, she tells him about entering a contest to write a short story following the Rebecca Ryan series of novels. He is patronizing, telling her, "The important thing, kid, is that you're doing something you like to do."

Cathy is notified by mail that she has won the contest, the prize is an all-expense-paid trip to Paris for two, an award ceremony and a meeting with the author of the Rebecca Ryan novels. Kevin tries to persuade her to decline, but she goes on the trip alone. While sightseeing in Paris, her purse is snatched. Chasing the thief, she runs into a street where she is hit by a motorist.

The accident leaves Cathy with amnesia; she thinks she is the detective, Rebecca Ryan. Escaping from the hospital she assumes Rebecca's dashing persona, lavish wardrobe, and residence at the Hôtel de Crillon. The hotel staff are so in awe of the novels that they go along with her demands. When she enters "Rebecca's" apartment, she is greeted by Alan McMann, who thinks she is the clerical assistant he has requested from an agency. He is the actual author of the Rebecca Ryan novels. Cathy ignores all of the tasks he assigns her, instead believing that Alan is Rebecca's gay sidekick, Dimitri.

Cathy as Rebecca is convinced that she must save Victor Marchand, the leader of the opposition party, from an assassination plot. Rebecca and Alan chase Victor around Paris in an attempt to protect him from the (fictitious) murder plot, with Victor instead getting injured several times from Rebecca's rescues. They are also running from a shadowy figure. Rebecca and Alan flee to Alan's mother Margaret's house. While there, Alan and Rebecca consummate their relationship.

Kevin, who has been following them, enters the house and meets Rebecca and Alan coming down the stairs. He punches Alan, but Rebecca doesn't see him. She and Alan run off to save Victor, who is on a train, but he jumps from it.

Rebecca and Alan come face to face with Kevin and Cathy's memory is back. She wakes in the hospital. Alan and his literary agent announce that Cathy's writing is so good that she could get a lucrative book deal.

While recovering at a hospital, Cathy apologizes to Alan for her delusions and bids him goodbye. At the airport, she realizes that she does not want to go home with Kevin. Leaving Kevin at the airport, she returns to the hotel to find Alan. They embrace, and are soon kidnapped.

Cathy and Alan learn their kidnapper is Victor, the man they'd been trying to "protect" all along. He has been seriously injured from Rebecca's repeated rescue attempts, and is clad in neck brace and arm sling, and walks with a cane. He reveals he is running a drug-smuggling operation, and he believes that Cathy and Alan know about his secret criminal dealings. Alan tries to tell Victor the truth about Cathy's accidental amnesia and series of lucky coincidences, but Victor doesn't believe them. Cathy and Alan manage to escape from their bonds and, in a leap of faith, jump into the moat surrounding Victor's chateau, eluding him and his henchmen.

The scene shifts to a living room. Cathy and Alan (now a couple and writing partners) are reading the manuscript of the most recent Rebecca Ryan novel to Cathy's two boys Kevin Jr. and Karl. They get to the end of the chapter, and pack the kids off to bed, in spite of their demands to know "what happens next". The film ends with some banter and cuddling where Alan and Cathy tease that the next part of the Rebecca Ryan story (i.e. their story) is too sexy to be written down.

== Cast ==
- JoBeth Williams as Cathy Palmer / Rebecca Ryan
- Tom Conti as Alan McMann
- Giancarlo Giannini as Victor Marchand
- Coral Browne as Margaret McMann
- James Staley as Kevin Palmer
- Christopher Daniel Barnes as Kevin Palmer Jr.
- Huckleberry Fox as Karl Palmer
- Jean Rougerie as Don Carlos
- Pierre Santini as Inspector Klaus
- Léon Zitrone as Ivan Stranauvlitch
- André Valardy as Dimitri
- Pierre Olaf as Priest
- Ginette Garcin as Nurse

== Production ==
The film was originally written by Ann Biderman. It was mentioned in 1980 as being based on an idea by Roger Vadim (then Biderman's partner) and would be made by Melvin Simon Productions. In 1981, Sally Field was mentioned as a possible star. The film was rewritten by David Greenwalt and Jim Kouf, who had just written Class. American Dream was dropped by Melvin Simon Productions and wound up at CBS Theatrical. It was envisioned as a vehicle for Goldie Hawn; when that did not come to fruition, the producers considered Dolly Parton, Jill Clayburgh and Mary Steenburgen, before director Rick Rosenthal suggested JoBeth Williams. Williams was coming off a string of successful films at the time, including Stir Crazy and Poltergeist. Williams accepted the part over taking a supporting role in the Robert Redford film The Natural because she wanted to make a film like Charade. "I think audiences are ready for a film with a romantic background," she said.

The film cost $10 million and was financed by CBS Theatrical Films. It was one of the first projects authorized by new production head William Self. CBS' first three films—Backroads, Table for Five and The Challenge—had been flops, with All the Sad Young Men (later retitled to Windy City) awaiting release and Grandview USA being shot at the same time as American Dreamer. "I loved the Katharine Hepburn comedies, the Ernst Lubitsch and Frank Capra films," said Williams. "There's nothing like a good screwball comedy, but I can't tell you how few scripts there are in that field. I wish I could do more." The film shot on location in Paris starting September 1983.

== Reception ==
American Dreamer was not a critical or box office success, earning only $5 million at the North American box office on a budget of $10 million.

Vincent Canby opened the review in The New York Times as follows:

Beginning with a sequence that, by an unlucky coincidence, duplicates the jokey opening of Romancing the Stone, American Dreamer goes on to become an even less funny comedy about a writer of trashily romantic suspense novels.

On the review aggregator website Rotten Tomatoes, 29% of 7 critics' reviews are positive, with an average rating of 4.3/10.

Director Rosenthal claimed in 2002 the movie was one of his favorite that he directed:

It was the highest testing movie at Warner Brothers in eight years but they couldn't figure out how to market it. They didn't have marque names starring. They didn't have a great poster. The poster they ended up with looks like a tax shelter movie from the 1970s... People discover this film all the time. There but for the grace of God goes a career that would've blossomed into making some more of those kind of movies, like Working Girl and some of the Goldie Hawn movies that came out.
