= Michael Cudlitz =

American actor (born 1964)

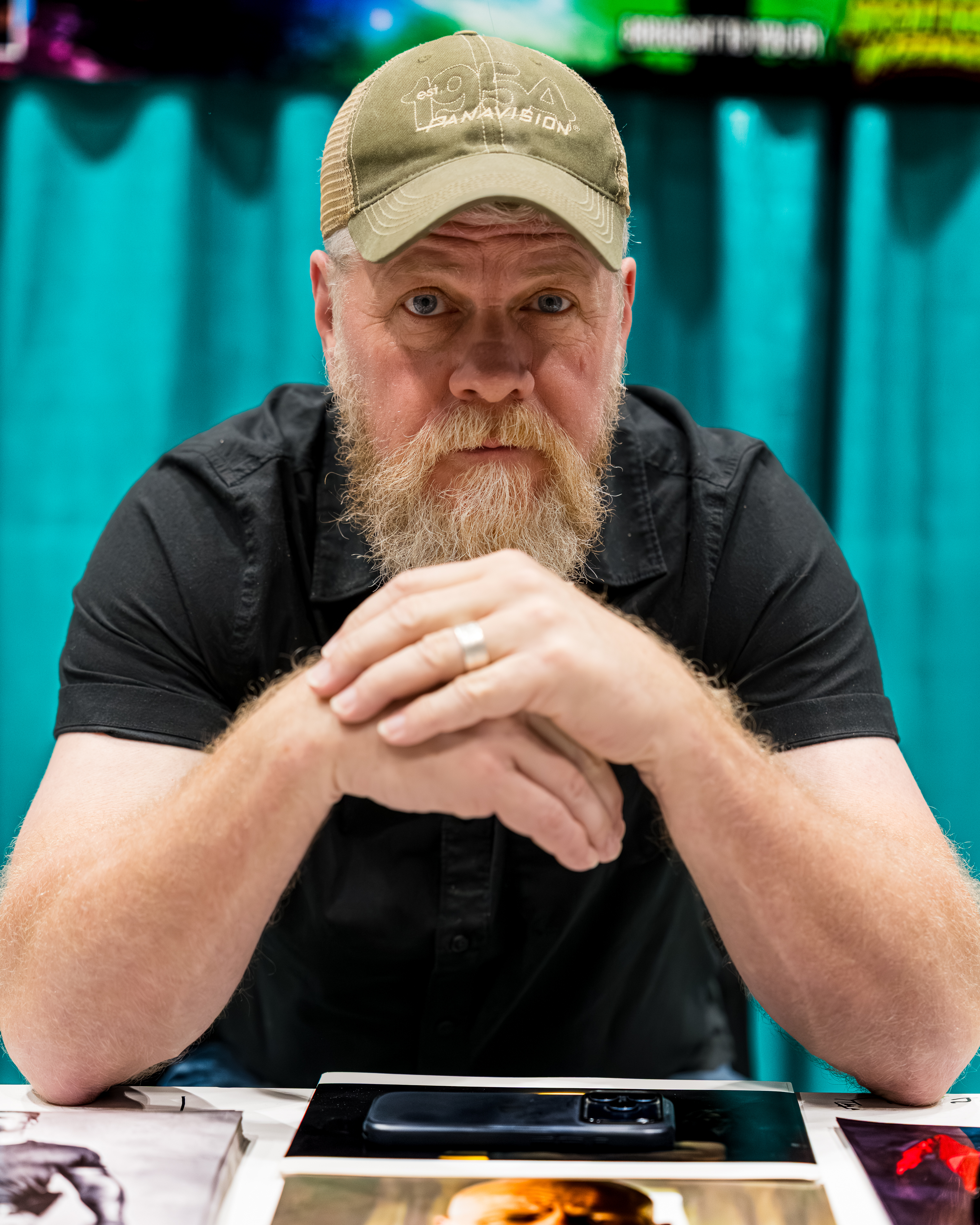
- Cudlitz at GalaxyCon Oklahoma City in 2026
- Born: December 29, 1964 (age 61); Long Island, New York, U.S.
- Education: California Institute of the Arts (BFA)
- Occupations: Actor, director
- Years active: 1989–present
- Known for: The Walking Dead; Southland; Band of Brothers; Superman & Lois
- Spouse: Rachael Cudlitz
- Children: 2

Michael Cudlitz (born December 29, 1964) is an American actor and director known for portraying John Cooper in the NBC/TNT drama series Southland (2009–2013) for which he won the Critics' Choice Television Award for Best Supporting Actor in a Drama Series in 2013, Sergeant Denver "Bull" Randleman in the HBO miniseries Band of Brothers (2001), and Sergeant Abraham Ford in the AMC horror series The Walking Dead (2014–2018).

== Early life ==
Cudlitz was born on December 29, 1964 on Long Island, New York, and raised in Lakewood Township, New Jersey. He is a 1982 graduate of Lakewood High School. He holds a Bachelor of Fine Arts from the California Institute of the Arts, from which he graduated in 1990.

== Career ==
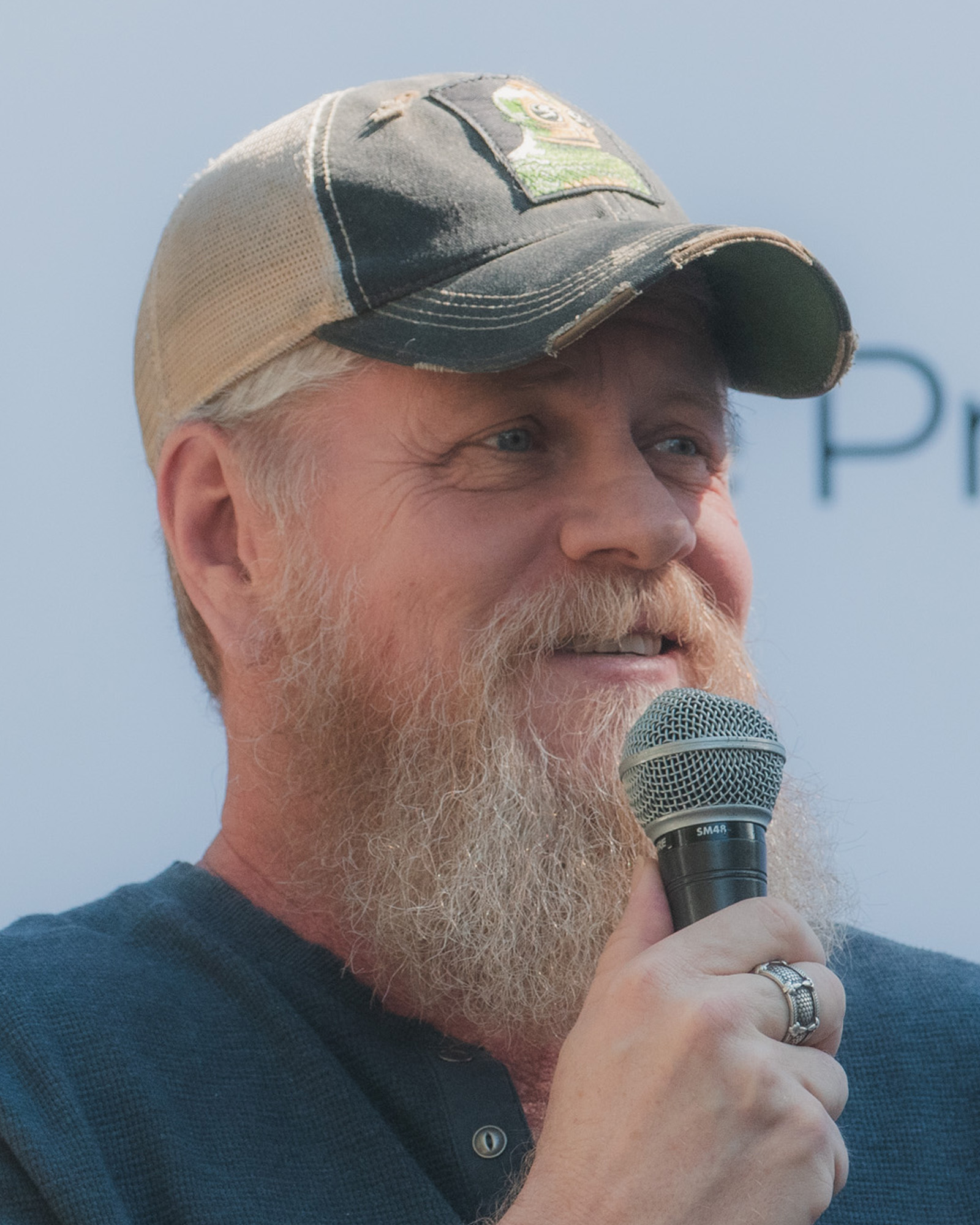
Cudlitz in 2025

Until he landed the role in Band of Brothers, Cudlitz worked in TV and film production in the art department of various shows including as a set carpenter. Cudlitz was a construction coordinator on Beverly Hills, 90210.

His first acting role was in the 1989 film Crystal Ball, playing Scottie. Other roles were Tony Miller on Beverly Hills, 90210 and Tad Overton on Dragon: The Bruce Lee Story, and in CSI: Crime Scene Investigation, the second seasons of 24, Lost, FOX series Standoff, and Prison Break. He was also in the movie A River Runs Through It. He guest starred on Over There. He played Bob Destepello in the 1997 film Grosse Pointe Blank. He also played a 30-second role as a bartender in the movie Forces of Nature in 1999.

His breakout role came in 2001 with his portrayal of Sgt. Denver "Bull" Randleman in the World War II miniseries, Band of Brothers. Cudlitz starred on the critically acclaimed, five-season television drama Southland as patrol officer John Cooper, a 20-year veteran and training officer. It was picked up by TNT, who aired the remaining episodes of its first season, bringing it back for a total of five seasons. The character struggled with chronic back pain, addiction to pain medication, and ethical issues relating to his partners. Prior to the start of shooting for the show, Cudlitz had a large mole removed from his right upper lip, which had previously been a signature feature of his appearance. The show was cancelled in 2013. Cudlitz won the Critics' Choice Television Award for Best Supporting Actor in a Drama Series for his role in 2013.

In 2009, Cudlitz appeared in the science fiction film Surrogates as Colonel Brendon. In 2013, Cudlitz played opposite Melanie Griffith in the movie, Dark Tourist.

From February 2014 to October 2016, he appeared in the AMC TV show The Walking Dead as Sergeant Abraham Ford, a character from the comic series of the same name. His first appearance was in the tenth episode of Season 4, an episode entitled "Inmates". Cudlitz's character was killed off in the premiere episode of the show's seventh season entitled "The Day Will Come When You Won't Be". Cudlitz quickly became a fan favorite, with fans noting his quirky and comedic sayings combined with his upfront approach.

From 2023 to 2024, Cudlitz played the DC Comics character Lex Luthor in the CW superhero drama television series Superman & Lois, based on the DC Comics characters Superman and Lois Lane.

=== Voice work ===
Cudlitz voiced Sgt. Glenn "Hawk" Hawkins in the video game Call of Duty 2: Big Red One. He provided additional voice work for Call of Duty: Modern Warfare 2, Call of Duty: Modern Warfare 3 and Call of Duty 4: Modern Warfare.

== Awards ==
- 2013: Critics Choice Awards, Best Supporting Actor in a Drama Series, Southland
- 2013: Entertainment Industries Council PRISM Awards, Southland (episode: "Legacy")

== Personal life ==
He is married to Rachael Cudlitz. They have two children. They met while students at CalArts.

== Filmography ==
=== Film ===
Year	Title	Role
1992	A River Runs Through It	Chub
1993	Dragon: The Bruce Lee Story	Tad Overton
1993	The Liars' Club	Jimbo
1996	Savage	Spillane
1996	Follow the Bitch	Ty
1996	D3: The Mighty Ducks	Cole
1997	Grosse Pointe Blank	Bob Destepello
1998	The Negotiator	Palermo
1999	Forces of Nature	Bartender
1999	Live Virgin	Bob
2000	A Question of Faith	James
2000	Lured Innocence	Harry Kravitz
2003	Welcome to the Neighborhood	George
2006	Running Scared	Sal 'Gummy Bear' Franzone
2008	Sex Drive	Rick
2008	Tenure	Tim
2009	Crossing Over	San Pedro ICE Processing Agent
2009	Surrogates	Colonel Brendan
2009	Stolen	Jonas
2011	Satin	Kip Tanner
2011	Inside Out	Detective Calgrove
2012	Rogue River	Sheriff Boyd; also associate producer
2013	Dark Tourist	Jim; also Producer
2013	Pawn Shop Chronicles	Ben
2013	Cesar Chavez	Sheriff Smith
2017	The Trustee	Timothy Waits
2018	Driven	Morgan Hetrick
2019	Five Women in the End	PJ Weller
2020	Return To Hardwick	Self (voice narration)
2023	Beautiful Disaster	Jim Maddox

=== Television (miniseries, TV movies, shorts) ===
Year	Title	Role	notes
1989	Crystal Ball	Scottie	Short
1996	Last Exit to Earth	Hardester	TV movie
1998	Thirst	Andy	TV movie
1999	Small Change	Gary	Short
2001	Band of Brothers	Sgt. Denver "Bull" Randleman	Miniseries; 10 episodes
2002	Live from Baghdad	Tom Murphy	TV movie
2004	Homeland Security	Agent Tango 12	TV movie
2008	Danny Fricke	Praeger	TV movie
2011	Silent Witness	Sam Robb	TV movie

=== Television ===
Year	Title	Role	Notes
1990	Hull High	Schwartz	Episodes: "Episode #1.2", "Episode #1.6"
1991	21 Jump Street	Dennis Richards	Episode: "Bad Day at Blackburn"
1991	L.A. Law	Passerby	Episode: "Do the Spike Thing"
1992	Step by Step	Ed	Episode: "Home Alone"
1992	Life Goes On	Ernie	Episode: "The Wall"
1991–1992	Growing Pains	Chuck	Episodes: "There Must Be a Pony", "The Call of the Wild"
1992–1993	Beverly Hills, 90210	Tony Miller	11 episodes
1993	Against the Grain	Bud Hardeman	Episodes: "Pilot", "The Buck Stops... There"
1994	Lifestories: Families in Crisis	Walton	Episode: "A Body to Die For: The Aaron Henry Story"
1994	Picket Fences	White Teenager #1	Episode: "Elective Conduct"
1994	The Marshal	Gary Lowell	Episode: "Kissing Cousins"
1996	ER	Injured Firefighter Lang	Episode: "The Healers"
1996	Pacific Blue	Brett Andrews	Episode: "The Enemy Within"
1996	Renegade	Patch / Beau	Episodes: "High Rollers", "The Dollhouse"
1997	JAG	Sergeant Tesla	Episode: "Force Recon"
1997	Leaving L.A.	Joey Reno	Episode: "The Black Widower"
1997	Party of Five	Schuyler	Episode: "4.2: Past Imperfect"
1998	Touched by an Angel	Landau	Episode: "God and Country"
1998	NYPD Blue	Joshua	Episode: "Prostrate Before the Law"
1999	Home Improvement	Kyle	Episode: "Whitewater"
1999	Buffy the Vampire Slayer	Bob	Episode: "The Zeppo"
1999	Chicago Hope		Episode: "And Baby Makes 10"
1999	Good vs Evil	The Wiz	Episode: "Men Are from Mars, Women Are Evil"
1999	Snoops	Michael Keppler	Episode: "Constitution"
1999	Love & Money	Joe	Episodes: "Everybody Doesn't Love Eamon", "Puff the Magic Sister"
2001	Walker, Texas Ranger	State Trooper	Episode: "Unsafe Speed"
2001	Six Feet Under	Dennis, Crossroads Leader	Episode: "Crossroads"
2001	The Mind of the Married Man	Contractor	Episodes: "Just Thinking of You", "When We Were Nice"
2001	Philly	Joe	Episode: "Live and Leg Die"
2001 & 2009	CSI: Crime Scene Investigation	Officer William Spencer / Josh Barston	2 episodes: "And Then There Were None" as Officer William Spencer, "The Grave Shift"
2002	The Practice	Russell Hampton	Episode: "The Test"
2002	Family Law	Darren Carson	Episode: "Big Brother"
2002	Push, Nevada		Episode: "Jim's Domain"
2002	Fastlane	Det. Ray Cornwright	Episode: "Girls Own Juice"
2002	MDs	Elkin	Episode: "R.I.P."
2002–2003	24	Rick Phillips	3 episodes: "Day 2: 2:00 p.m.–3:00 p.m.", "Day 2: 3:00 p.m.–4:00 p.m.", "Day 2: 4:00 p.m.–5:00 p.m."
2004	JAG	Corporal Hal Strange	Episode: "Take It Like a Man"
2004	Nip/Tuck	Brody	Episode: "Joel Gideon"
2005	Las Vegas	Brian Carlton Venturi - the Kidnapper	Episode: "When You Got to Go, You Got to Go"
2005	Medical Investigation	Lt. Troy Adams	Episode: "Mousetrap"
2005	CSI: Miami	'Mac' MacKern	Episode: "Nothing to Lose"
2004 & 2005	Without a Trace	Mark Casey; Freddy Katen	2 episodes: "The Line", "John Michaels"
2005	Line of Fire	Jury Member	Episode: "This Land Is Your Land"
2005	Over There	Colonel Ryan	Episode: "The Prisoner"
2005	The Dead Zone	Herb Smith	Episode: "Babble On"
2005	Prison Break	Corrections Officer Robert 'Bob' Hudson	2 episodes: "Riots, Drills and the Devil: Part 1", "Riots, Drills and the Devil: Part 2"
2005	Wanted	Dep. Reed	Episode: "Lips Are Lips"
2005	Sleeper Cell	LAPD Detective Walt Moss	Episode: "Intramural"
2006	Close to Home	Dan Johnson	Episode: "Escape"
2006	CSI: NY	Vern Dox	Episode: "Super Men"
2004 & 2006	Dr. Vegas	Glen	2 episodes: "Lust for Life", "For Love or Money"
2006–2007	Standoff	Frank Rogers	18 episodes
2007	Bones	Lucky	Episode: "Death in the Saddle"
2007	Criminal Minds	Francis Goehring	Episode: "Identity"
2005 & 2008	Lost	Big Mike Walton	2 episodes: "Collision", "The Beginning of the End"
2008	The Cleaner	JWB	Episode: "Pilot"
2007–2008	Life	Mark Rawls	3 episodes: "Pilot: Merit Badge", "Fill It Up", "Did You Feel That?"
2009	Knight Rider	Lead Gunman	Episode: "Exit Light, Enter Knight"
2009	Eleventh Hour	Ben Finney	Episode: "Minamata"
2009	Saving Grace	Donald Gilmore	Episode: "The Heart of a Cop"
2009–2013	Southland	John Cooper	43 episodes Winner - Critics' Choice Television Award for Best Supporting Actor in a Drama Series
2014–2018	The Walking Dead	Abraham Ford	30 episodes Recurring (season 4); Main cast (seasons 5–7); Special guest star (episode: "The First Day of the Rest of Your Life"); Uncredited voice role (Episode: "What Comes After")
2019–2022	The Walking Dead	—N/a	Director; 4 episodes (seasons 9–11)
2015	Ballers	Dan Balsamo	2 episodes: "Head-On", "Gaslighting"
2016	House of Lies	Kohl Brother	2 Episodes: "Violent Agreement", "No Es Fácil"
2018	Young Sheldon	NASA director	Episode: "Gluons, Guacamole, and the Color Purple"
2018–2019	The Kids Are Alright	Mike Cleary	Main cast: 23 episodes
2020	The Walking Dead: World Beyond	—N/a	Director; 2 episodes
2021	Invincible	Josef / Red Rush	Episode: "It's About Time"
2021	Clarice	Paul Krendler	Main cast
2022	Bosch: Legacy	Edge	Episode: "Always/All Ways"
2023–2024	Superman & Lois	Lex Luthor	Guest (season 3); Main cast (season 4), 11 episodes; also director, episode: "Sharp Dressed Man"
2026	Marshals	Randall Clegg	

=== Video games ===
Year	Title	Voice role	Notes
2005	Call of Duty 2	Pvt. Braeburn	Also provides voice work for NPC U.S. Rangers
2005	Call of Duty 2: Big Red One	Sgt. Glenn "Hawk" Hawkins	
2007	Call of Duty 4: Modern Warfare	Griffin, additional voices	
2009	Red Faction Guerrilla	Saul Marius	
2009	Call of Duty: Modern Warfare 2	Additional voices	
2011	Call of Duty: Modern Warfare 3	Griffin, additional voices	

== Crew work ==
=== Art department ===
- 1986–1988: Tales from the Darkside – carpenter (12 episodes)
- 1988: The Unnamable – carpenter
- 1989: W.B., Blue and the Bean – set construction
- 1989: C.H.U.D. II: Bud the C.H.U.D. – carpenter
- 1990–1993: Beverly Hills, 90210 – construction coordinator (65 episodes)
- 1996: Dunston Checks In – propmaker gang boss
- 1998: American History X – construction coordinator
- 2007: Nobel Son – propmaker
