= Savage (1996 film) =

1996 science-fiction film directed by Avi Nesher

- Promotional film poster
- Directed by: Avi Nesher
- Screenplay by: Patrick Highsmith; Peter Sagal
- Story by: Patrick Highsmith
- Produced by: Avi Nesher
- Starring: Olivier Gruner; Jennifer Grant; Kario Salem; Kristin Minter; Sam McMurray
- Music by: Roger Neill
- Production company: Mahagonny Pictures
- Release date: 1996
- Running time: 98 minutes
- Country: United States
- Language: English

Savage is a 1996 American science fiction film directed by Avi Nesher, starring Olivier Gruner, Jennifer Grant, Kario Salem, Kristin Minter, and Sam McMurray.

== Plot ==
Rancher Alex Verne (Gruner) is placed in a psychiatric hospital after his wife and son are murdered in their home by unknown assassins. For two years he remains in the hospital never speaking and hardly leaving his bed. During a stormy night Alex escapes the hospital by breaking through his room window; he then makes his way out of town into the surrounding desert wilderness. A voice saying, "Alex, come to me" leads him to a large cave where he finds paintings on the walls that seem to depict ancient alien visitors and technology. Alex lives in the cave and survives by eating insects and hunting wild rabbits with a stone-tipped spear he makes. One night he is awoken by voices and screams from within the cave. A featureless white alien appears and quickly morphs its appearance to mimic Alex's deceased wife, Julie. The apparition urges Alex to find the murderer "before he does it to millions of others", to which Alex vows he will find and kill whoever did this. The alien then morphs into the man responsible for killing Alex's family who laughs then disappears when Alex throws his spear. Alex is suddenly enveloped in an electrical energy field that inflicts great pain, but bestows him superhuman strength. The energy dissipates and Alex tears off his clothes and screams, having become savage.

Alex wanders into town at night, still unclothed, where he encounters two policemen on patrol. They take him for a psychotic vagrant and bring him into the police station to be detained overnight.

Reese Burroughs is the Chairman of the sinister Titan Corporation, a tech company that produces popular virtual reality games. He and his henchmen, Marie Beloc, Edgar Wallace, and Allan Poe, have been monitoring real-time police data looking for reports of people with no cloths and no ID who arrived from the desert. Alex's arrest triggers an alert and they all make their way to the Chairman's office to receive orders. Reese orders a team of hitmen to the holding facility to kill Alex. The hitmen arrive in the holding cell disguised as detainees and pull a knife on Alex. Using his newfound strength Alex escapes the grips of the would-be assassins, pulls the window bars off the wall with his bare hands and escapes the facility after jumping over the security fence. Back at Titan Corporation Reese and the henchmen learn the details of the prison escape. Edgar expresses astonishment at what one man could do, whereupon Reese reveals that was no man, it was "a savage", and this has been his worst nightmare. Reese says the savage will come to Titan Corporation. They send notice to their network of hired killers throughout the city to stop the savage.

Alex is wandering the city streets at night avoiding detection and happens upon a store window with TV screens. He watches a television interview of Reese Burroughs discussing his popular virtual reality games. Alex recognizes Reese as his family's killer from the alien's vision in the cave, and learns from the interview that Reese spends his time at Titan Plaza.

Alex must reach Reese at Titan Plaza to avenge the murder of his wife and child while avoiding the host of professional killers who seek him out.

== Cast ==
- Olivier Gruner as Savage/Alex Verne
- Jennifer Grant as Nicky Carter
- Kario Salem as Reese Burroughs
- Kristin Minter as Marie Beloc
- Sam McMurray as Edgar Wallace
- Herschel Sparber as Allan Poe
- Tom Schanley as Halliday
- Michael Cudlitz as Spillane
- Luke Askew as Captain Carl Rohmer
- Maria Von Hartz as Veronica
- Victoria Hemingson as Julie Verne (credited as Victoria Morsell)
- Jordan Stuart as Jimmy Verne
- Paulo Tocha as Inquisitor
- Moon Jones as Armani Warlord
- John Henry Whitaker as Biker
- Vince Lozano as News Vendor
- Darren Carter as Shazam
- Dyrk Ashton as Muscleman
- Peter Navy Tuisosopo as Samoan
- Big Yank as Fridge
- Bari K. Willerford as Assistant Warden
- Michael O'Connell as Night Nurse
- Peter Kaitlyn as Day Nurse
- Kevin Wixted as Fred
- Forbes Riley as Commercial Girl
- Michael Reid Davis as Sergeant Chartres
- G. Eric Miles as Officer
- Paul Eves as Loverboy
- Jennifer Sommerfeld as Bartender
- Greet Ramaeker as Waitress

== Reception ==
In a retrospect review, Matty Budrewicz of The Schlock Pit wrote: "Savage is a strange brew and a strong contender for the title of weirdest DTV sci-fi flick of its or, indeed, any era. Whether that's a recommendation or not is on you. Savage certainly sits at the bottom end of the Nesher/Gruner spectrum and I'd be loath to call it successful – but it's definitely a memorable, worth-a-single-watch experience."

Sci-fi film review website Moria gave the film one-half stars saying, "As Avi Nesher's films go, Savage unfortunately falls down somewhere in She territory. It is not quite the same mind-boggling, compulsively-bad experience that She was but definitely comes close at times. Savage is certainly a bizarre experience, as much for one not only having no idea where it is going, as not even what type of film it is trying to be, from one moment to the next."

The film is rated one star by RadioTimes Guide to Science Fiction, criticizing a poor script that, "does not properly explain the mysterious alien force that awakens shooting victim Olivier Gruner from his stupor, and subsequently drives him to destroy an evil corporation headed by Kario Salem."

The film was spoofed on RiffTrax by comedians Mike Nelson, Kevin Murphy, and Bill Corbett on September 10, 2021.
