= Angela Amato Velez =

American television writer and producer

- Occupations: Television writer and producer

Angela Amato Velez is an American television writer and producer. She has also worked as a police officer, legal aid attorney and novelist. She has worked as a writer and producer on the police drama Southland and the legal drama The Good Wife. She was nominated for a Writers Guild of America Award for best new series for The Good Wife in 2010.

== Career ==
Amato Velez began working in television in 2003 as a story consultant and writer for the NBC police drama Third Watch. The series was produced by John Wells. She wrote the fifth-season episodes "A Ticket Grows in Brooklyn" and "In Plain View". She continued in the same role for the series sixth and final season in 2004. She wrote the episodes "Forever Blue" and "End of Tour".

Amato Velez joined Wells on his next police project, a drama entitled Southland. She served as a consulting producer and writer on the series' first season. Amato Velez co-wrote the episode "Sally in the Alley" with creator and executive producer Ann Biderman. She also co-wrote the teleplay for the episode "Westside" with fellow consulting producer Dee Johnson based on a story by Biderman. She left the crew of Southland after the first season.

She became a consulting producer and writer for the first season of CBS legal drama The Good Wife. She wrote the episode "Conjugal". Amato Velez and the writing staff were nominated for a Writers Guild of America Award for best new series for their work on the first season. She left the series when it completed its original thirteen episode order despite a further nine episodes being ordered.
