= Movie Stars (TV series) =

American sitcom

- Genre: Sitcom
- Created by: Wayne Lemon
- Written by: Chris Atwood; Felicia D. Henderson; Wayne Lemon; Emily Cutler; Susan Nirah Jaffee; Adam Markowitz; Kate Nielsen; Bax Skahill
- Directed by: Peter Bonerz; Gil Junger; Dinah Manoff; James Widdoes
- Starring: Harry Hamlin; Jennifer Grant; Mark Benninghofen; Marnette Patterson; Zack Hopkins; Rachel David; Anne Haney
- Composers: Paul Buckley; Guy Moon; Steve Tyrell; Jonathan Wolff
- Country of origin: United States
- Original language: English
- No. of seasons: 2
- No. of episodes: 21 (1 unaired)

Production
- Executive producers: Jonathan Axelrod; James Widdoes; Gil Junger; Wayne Lemon; Harry Hamlin; Susan Nirah Jaffee
- Producers: Dionne Kirschner; Adam Markowitz; Julie Tsutsui; Jennifer Grant; Chris Atwood
- Cinematography: Richard Hissong
- Editors: Art Kellner; Andy Zall
- Camera setup: Multi-camera
- Running time: 30 minutes
- Production companies: Axelrod-Widdoes Entertainment; Castle Rock Entertainment

Original release
- Network: The WB
- Release: July 11, 1999 – June 18, 2000

Movie Stars is an American sitcom television series that aired on The WB from July 11, 1999, to June 18, 2000. It stars Harry Hamlin and Jennifer Grant as famous Hollywood actors trying to raise their children.

== Synopsis ==
Reese Hardin (Hamlin) was the star of over-the-top but high-grossing action films while Jacey Watts (Grant), his second wife, was an often-nominated dramatic actress. They lived in a fancy house in Malibu, California, (next door to Tom Hanks, who was never seen) and raising their children, Apache and Moonglow. Also living with them were Reese's less successful brother Todd and Lori, Reese's daughter from his first marriage. Apache always tried to come up with marketing ideas for his parents; in the second season he worked to try to get Jacey the Oscar he felt she deserved. A running gag was that Todd's poker buddies were the real-life less-successful brothers of John Travolta, Patrick Swayze, and Sylvester Stallone, playing fictionalized versions of themselves.

== Cast ==
=== Main ===
- Harry Hamlin as Reese Hardin, action star. Reese is revered for his heroic adventure performances, including the role of Persius in Clash of the Titans (a running inside-joke), but his sensitive portrayals and frequent lack of clothing have made him a reluctant gay icon and favorite among female viewers.
- Jennifer Grant as Jacey Wyatt, award-winning actress. Although she's 15 years Reese's junior, Jacey is generally mature and an anchor for her family. In her professional life, however, she has a propensity for being petty and jealous.
- Mark Benninghofen as Todd Hardin, Reese's younger brother. Todd graduated from Juilliard and set off to Hollywood with his brother in tow, not realizing Reese would waltz onto the scene and become a superstar. Todd has largely been relegated to commercials and extra work, with significant appearances in Mentos and Japanese underwear commercials, as well as appearing as an extra in Titanic. Todd's only friends are other siblings of famous persons, including Stallone, Swayze, and Travolta.
- Marnette Patterson as Lori Lansford, Reese's surly teenage daughter from his first marriage. New to the Hollywood scene and naive to its ways, Lori frequently finds herself at odds with her family, who have her best interests at heart. Shiri Appleby played the role in the original version of the pilot, but Patterson reshot her scenes prior to the show's debut.
- Zack Hopkins as Apache Hardin, Reese and Jacy's teenage son. Apache is an Alex P. Keaton type, a smart alec teenager who tries to weasel his way into the elite Hollywood social circles.
- Rachel David as Moonglow Hardin, Reese and Jacey's precocious but potentially unhinged young daughter.
- Anne Haney as Francine Hardin, Reese and Todd's mother. Following the death of her husband, Francine moved into Reese's Malibu beach house, where she spent her days acting as a housekeeper, making snarky remarks, and occasionally revealing family secrets. Francine vanished without explanation in season two.

=== Recurring ===
- Joey Travolta as himself. Joey is level-headed and nurturing, the mother hen of Todd's poker group—although he has no problems razzing his buddies if he feels that they deserve it.
- Don Swayze as himself. Don is the oddball of the group, overly sensitive and sometimes outright weird.
- Frank Stallone as himself. Although Frank loves his brother, he's deeply jealous of Sly's fame. He's also prone to breaking into song.

== Episodes ==
=== Season 1 (1999) ===
| No. overall | No. in season | Title | Directed by | Written by | Original release date | Prod. code |
|---|---|---|---|---|---|---|
| 1 | 1 | "Pilot" | James Widdoes | Wayne Lemon | July 11, 1999 | 245185 |
It's another day in the Malibu home of Hollywood power couple Reese and Jacey when Reese's 17-year-old daughter Lori unexpectedly arrives at the door and announces plans to stay. Also, Moonglow makes an appearance in Reese's new alien film.
| 2 | 2 | "Educating Lori" | James Widdoes | Wayne Lemon | July 12, 1999 | 245155 |
Apache gets suspended from school for fighting, but he neglects to reveal that the fight was with a boy who was sexually harassing Lori. Meanwhile, Todd appears as Tweety bird at a children's birthday party, but his attempt to impress their famous parents results in the kids mauling him.
| 3 | 3 | "Bittersweet Seventeen" | James Widdoes | Story by : Wayne Lemon; Teleplay by : Wayne Lemon & Bix Skahill | July 18, 1999 | 245152 |
Reese throws a lavish birthday party for Lori, which creates a rift between him and each of his children. Meanwhile, Todd dates Justine Priestley, but he remains oblivious to the fact that she's Jason Priestley's sisters.
| 4 | 4 | "Leap of Faith" | James Widdoes | Wayne Lemon | July 19, 1999 | 245154 |
Reese tries to impress Lori with a motorcycle stunt; MTV reporter Kurt Loder has a front-row seat at a family blow-up; Todd licenses a transgender Reese Hardin action figure.
| 5 | 5 | "Mothers & Brothers" | James Widdoes | Wayne Lemon | July 25, 1999 | 245151 |
Jacey's trashy mother, Audrey (Loni Anderson), drops in unannounced and immediately bonds with Lori. Meanwhile, Reese encourages Todd to make his own Goodwill Hunting, so Todd rewrites the script.
| 6 | 6 | "Like Father, Like Son" | Dinah Manoff | Wayne Lemon | August 1, 1999 | 245157 |
When Reese is named "The Sexiest Man Alive," it's not only an annoyance to him, but also to Apache. Meanwhile, Todd gets his hands on Quentin Tarantino's first screenplay, and he tries to find producers.
| 7 | 7 | "Third Time's a Charm" | Dinah Manoff | Wayne Lemon | August 8, 1999 | 245156 |
Jayce's nervousness at the announcement of Oscar nominations is amplified by a pregnancy scare. Meanwhile, Todd struggles with whether or not to sleep with Jayce's agent (Kate Hodge).
| 8 | 8 | "Bad Boy, Bad Boy, What'cha Gonna Do?" | James Widdoes | Wayne Lemon | August 15, 1999 | 245153 |
Lori dates a bad boy actor; Todd and the brothers open a juice bar.

=== Season 2 (2000) ===
| No. overall | No. in season | Title | Directed by | Written by | Original release date | Prod. code |
|---|---|---|---|---|---|---|
| 9 | 1 | "The Two Faces of Steve" | James Widdoes | Chris Atwood & Wayne Lemon | April 2, 2000 | 245253 |
Reese sets up Lori with a young waiter (Todd Babcock), but Apache suspects the guy has ulterior motives. Meanwhile, Todd becomes unmanageable and tries to expand his bit role in Reese's new film.
| 10 | 2 | "Video Gurl" | Gil Junger | Felicia D. Henderson | April 9, 2000 | 245256 |
After missing out on seeing Kenny Wayne Shepherd when the family appeared on Donny & Marie, Lori gets a chance to star in his latest music video. Meanwhile, Reese discovers Todd never disposed of their father's ashes, and the situation escalates after Jacey makes a donation to the local thrift shop.
| 11 | 3 | "The Seduction of Reese Hardin" | Gil Junger | Wayne Lemon | April 16, 2000 | 245255 |
Reese is offered the lead in the new Batman film, but there's one caveat: He has to sleep with the producer (Lisa Rinna, Hamlin's real-life wife). Todd quarrels with his buddies and hosts a poker game with another set of famous siblings (Joe Estevez, April Gooding, Michael Stone). Lori gets fed up with chauffeuring Apache and his friends to and from school.
| 12 | 4 | "La Vida Loca" | Gil Junger | Wayne Lemon | April 23, 2000 | 245257 |
| 13 | 5 | "Last Dance" | Gil Junger | Wayne Lemon | April 30, 2000 | 245262 |
| 14 | 6 | "Oscar Wild" | Gil Junger | Susan Nirah Jaffee | May 14, 2000 | 245260 |
| 15 | 7 | "The Goodbye Guy" | Gil Junger | Chris Atwood | May 21, 2000 | 245258 |
| 16 | 8 | "Two Guys, Two Girls & a Guest House" | Gil Junger | Wayne Lemon | May 28, 2000 | 245251 |
| 17 | 9 | "No Justice, No Piece" | Gil Junger | Susan Nirah Jaffee | June 4, 2000 | 245252 |
| 18 | 10 | "Stand by Me" | Gil Junger | Adam Markowitz | June 11, 2000 | 245254 |
| 19 | 11 | "He's Reese. He's Here. Get Used to It" | Peter Bonerz | Wayne Lemon | June 18, 2000 | 245263 |
| 20 | 12 | "Whose on First?" | Gil Junger | Kate Nielsen | June 18, 2000 | 245259 |
| 21 | 13 | "Sink-Chronicity" | Gil Junger | Wayne Lemon | Unaired | 245261 |
