= Smith (TV series) =

American drama TV series

- Genre: Drama
- Created by: John Wells
- Starring: Ray Liotta; Virginia Madsen; Jonny Lee Miller; Simon Baker; Franky G Amy Smart; Chris Bauer; Lisa Vidal; Shohreh Aghdashloo
- Composer: Doug DeAngelis
- Country of origin: United States
- Original language: English
- No. of seasons: 1
- No. of episodes: 7 (4 unaired)

Production
- Running time: 57 minutes (Pilot); 43 minutes
- Production companies: John Wells Productions; Warner Bros. Television

Original release
- Network: CBS
- Release: September 19 – October 3, 2006

Smith is an American drama television series that premiered on September 19, 2006 on CBS, created by John Wells. The series was canceled after only three episodes had aired.

== Plot ==
The show follows a group of professional thieves who struggle to keep their work separate from the rest of their lives. The leader of the group Bobby Stevens seeks to end his criminal ways after a few more big scores. His plan is not successful and his wife Hope becomes suspicious. Bobby has a day job as a salesman for a paper cup manufacturer, which allows him to travel frequently. Each episode portrays a robbery or preparation for other jobs the thieves plan to undertake. Ongoing subplots examine each of the characters' double lives, a necessity in order to stay one step ahead of the authorities and shield their families.

== Cast ==
- Ray Liotta as Bobby Stevens
- Virginia Madsen as Hope Stevens
- Simon Baker as Jeff Breen
- Jonny Lee Miller as Tom
- Franky G as Joe Garcia
- Amy Smart as Annie
- Chris Bauer as Agent Dodd
- Shohreh Aghdashloo as Charlie

== Broadcast ==
The show was called "The worst new show of the season," by USA Today and was canceled on October 6, 2006, after only three airings, becoming the first new show of the 2006–07 television season to be canceled.

In the UK, the show was also scheduled to be seen during the 2006 season, on ITV4. ITV4 rebroadcast the series in March 2007. It was later shown on Hallmark in August 2007 with all seven episodes airing.

The entire series (including the four episodes that never aired on CBS) was available on the network's Innertube broadband video section for a few weeks. Warner Bros. Television made all seven episodes (with a synopsis for the plotted eighth through twelfth episodes) available via digital download in November 2006 on Apple's iTunes Store, AOL, and Amazon.

== Episodes ==
No.	Title	Directed by	Written by	U.S. air date	Prod. code	U.S. viewers (millions)
1	"Pilot"	Christopher Chulack	John Wells	September 19, 2006	276010	11.00
2	"Two"	Christopher Chulack	John Wells	September 26, 2006	3T6001	9.67
3	"Three"	Christopher Chulack	John Wells	October 3, 2006	3T6002	8.38
4	"Four"	Stephen Cragg	Mark Rosner	N/A	3T6003	N/A
5	"Five"	Nelson McCormick	R. Scott Gemmill	N/A	3T6004	N/A
6	"Six"	Alex Zakrzewski	Frank Military	N/A	3T6005	N/A
7	"Seven"	Christopher Chulack	Theresa Rebeck	N/A	3T6006	N/A
