= Kario Salem =

American actor

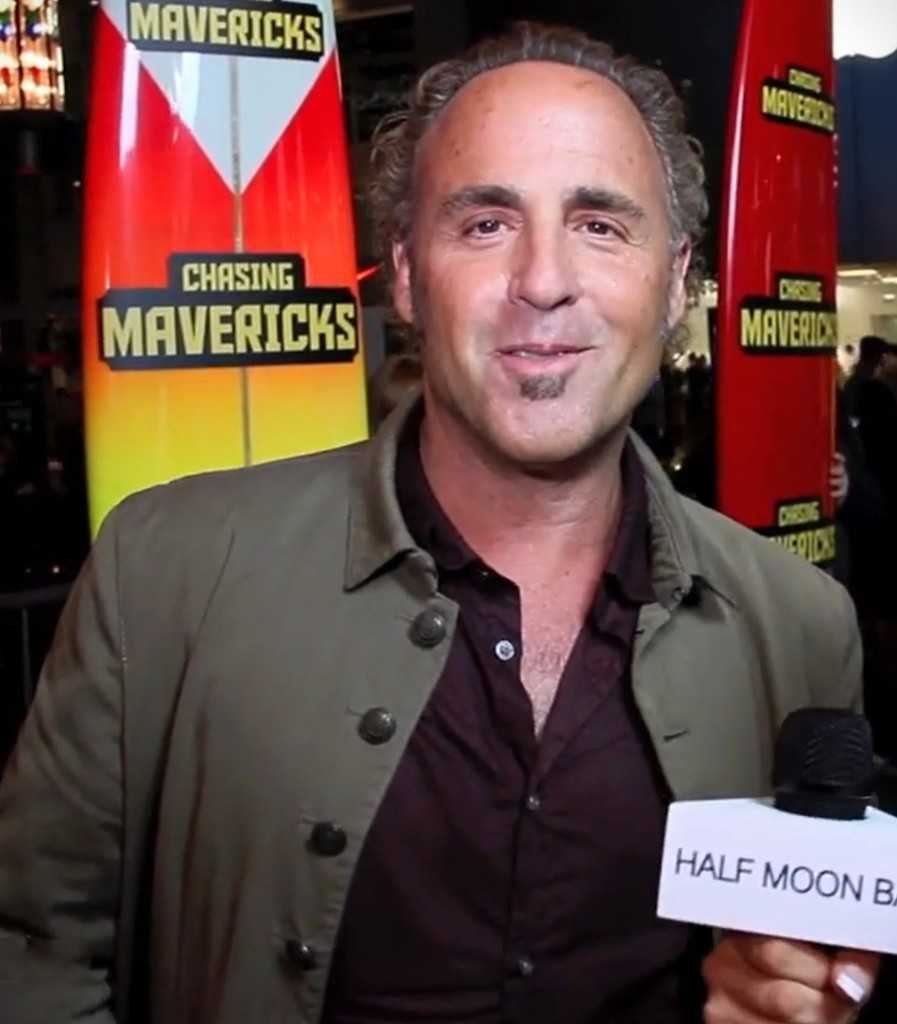
- Salem in 2012
- Born: May 23, 1955 (age 71); Los Angeles, California, U.S.
- Education: Juilliard School
- Occupation: Actor / Screenwriter
- Years active: 1975–present

Kario Salem (born May 23, 1955) is an American television, film, stage actor and screenwriter.

== Early life ==
Salem, who was born and raised in Los Angeles, is a 1973 graduate of Agoura High School in Agoura, California.

== Career ==
In 1997, Salem earned an Emmy Award as a writer for the television special Don King: Only in America, which also earned him a PEN nomination. The film also won the Broadcast Film Critics Award and Peabody Award for Best Television Film of the year. He received a second Emmy nomination the following year for writing The Rat Pack, in addition to a second PEN nomination. He also won as Brad Stephens in Hawaii Five-O season 8 episode, "The Deadly Persuasion".

In 1991, Salem won a Drama-Logue award for his performance in Richard Greenberg's The Extra Man at South Coast Repertory Theater, as well as a Boston Critics award for his performance as "Cousins" in George Bernard Shaw's Major Barbara with Cherry Jones at the American Repertory Theater in Cambridge. Salem also co-starred on Broadway as "Scoop" in The Heidi Chronicles with Mary McDonnell.

In 1975, he starred as Mr. Applegate in the Valley Musical Theatre Institute production of Damn Yankees. Also in the cast were Kevin Spacey and April Winchell, who were both 15 at the time.

He has appeared in over 80 guest starring roles on television, including Francis Campion in Testimony of Two Men (1977), Marcel Pasquinel in Centennial (1978), and the ghost of a dead soldier in an Emmy Award-winning episode of M*A*S*H. His film roles include the role of Jocko in Triumph of the Spirit (1989), the role of The Grand Inquistor in Ridley's Scott's 1492: Conquest of Paradise (1992), and the bleach blonde French gangster in Roger Avary's Killing Zoe (1993).

Salem is also a composer and partner in the music company, "Matter Music", best known for its soundtracks for the films Riding Giants and Wedding Crashers.

In 2018, Salem was hired by Warner Bros./DC Films to write the screenplay for the comic-book movie based on Jack Kirby's New Gods, directed by Ava DuVernay. The movie was no longer moving forward by April 2021.

Recently, Salem decided to revisit his passion for music. Known as K.O., personal support from Bob Dylan, Juval Aviv, and many more has helped spread his music to the masses. K.O.'s music video Stand Down, starring Billy Bob Thornton, won Best Music Video at the Toronto Shorts International Film Festival and has over 13 million views on Facebook and counting. He is represented by Creative Artists Agency.

== Filmography ==
=== Film ===
Kario Salem film credits
Year	Title	Role
1981	Underground Aces	Sheik
1982	Some Kind of Hero	Young Soldier
1986	Nomads	Schacter
1988	Starlight: A Musical Movie	Arthur Hall
1989	Triumph of the Spirit	Jacko
1991	The Boy Who Cried Bitch	Dr. Habib
1992	1492: Conquest of Paradise	Arojaz
1993	Killing Zoe	Jean
1996	Savage	Reese Burroughs

=== Television ===
Kario Salem television credits
Year	Title	Role	Notes
1975	The Rookies	Aldon Phillips	Season 4, Episode 4 "Someone who cares"
1975	Hawaii Five-O	Brad Stevens	Season 8, Episode 16 "Deadly Persuasion"
1978	Centennial	Marcel "Mike" Pasquinel	TV mini series
1979	The Thirteenth Day: The Story of Esther	Dalphon	TV movie
1982	M*A*S*H	Private Westen	Episode: "Follies of the Living - Concerns of the Dead"
1987	The Equalizer	Griswald	Episode: "A Place to Stay"
1989	Kojak: Ariana	Detective Paco Montana	TV movie
1989	Kojak: Fatal Flaw	Detective Paco Montana	TV movie
1990	Kojak: Flowers for Matty	Detective Paco Montana	TV movie
