= Angel Street (TV series) =

- Series premiere print advertisement
- Genre: Crime drama
- Created by: John Wells
- Starring: Robin Givens; Pamela Gidley; Ron Dean; Joe Guzaldo
- Country of origin: United States
- Original language: English
- No. of seasons: 1
- No. of episodes: 8 (4 unaired)

Production
- Executive producer: John Wells
- Running time: 60 minutes
- Production companies: John Wells and Friends; Warner Bros. Television

Original release
- Network: CBS
- Release: September 15 – October 3, 1992

Angel Street is an American crime drama television series created by John Wells, that aired on CBS from September 15 to October 3, 1992.

== Premise ==
Two female detectives, a veteran and an ambitious rookie, team up on the streets of Chicago.

== Cast ==
- Robin Givens as Detective Anita King
- Pamela Gidley as Detective Dorothy Paretsky
- Ron Dean as Detective Branigan
- Joe Guzaldo as Sgt. Ciamacco
- Rick Snyder as Detective Kanaskie
- Luray Cooper as Detective Llewellyn
- Danny Goldring as Detective Delaney

== Episodes ==
| No. | Title | Directed by | Written by | Original release date |
|---|---|---|---|---|
| 1 | "Pilot" | Rod Holcomb | John Wells | September 15, 1992 |
| 2 | "Pilot" | Rod Holcomb | John Wells | September 15, 1992 |
A rookie detective is teamed with a veteran to investigate a drug-related murder.
| 3 | "Midnight Times a Hundred" | Fred Gerber | Lydia Woodward | September 26, 1992 |
Paretsky and King investigate a multiple-homicide.
| 4 | "The Blonde in the Pond" | Kristoffer Tabori | John Wells | October 3, 1992 |
King reopens a murder case that Branigan couldn't solve.
| 5 | "Death of a Car Salesman" | Paris Barclay | Dawn Prestwich & Nicole Yorkin | UNAIRED |
A used-car salesman is murdered. King is having some problems in her personal life.
| 6 | "According to Etta" | Jan Eliasberg | Lydia Woodward | UNAIRED |
| 7 | "Probable Cause" | Fred Gerber | John Wells | UNAIRED |
| 8 | "Mother, May I?" | TBD | Dwayne Johnson-Cochran | UNAIRED |
