= Citizen Baines =

American television series

- Genre: Drama
- Created by: Lydia Woodward
- Written by: Patty Lin; Will Scheffer; P.K. Simonds; Karyn Usher; John Wells; Lydia Woodward
- Directed by: Christopher Chulack; Lesli Linka Glatter; Charles Haid; Dwight Little
- Starring: James Cromwell; Embeth Davidtz; Jane Adams; Jacinda Barrett; Arye Gross; Scotty Leavenworth; Matt McCoy
- Composer: Marty Davich
- Country of origin: United States
- Original language: English
- No. of seasons: 1
- No. of episodes: 9 (3 unaired)

Production
- Executive producers: Christopher Chulack; John Wells; Lydia Woodward
- Producers: Lesli Linka Glatter; David J. Latt; James Cromwell
- Cinematography: Ernest Holzman
- Editors: Kevin Casey; Susanne Stinson Malles; Suzanne Michaels; Frederick Peterson
- Running time: 60 minutes
- Production companies: Lydia Woodward Productions; John Wells Productions; Warner Bros. Television

Original release
- Network: CBS
- Release: September 29 – November 3, 2001

Citizen Baines is an American drama television series created by Emmy Award-winning producer Lydia Woodward, that stars James Cromwell. The series premiered on CBS September 29, 2001, and ended on November 3, 2001.

== Synopsis ==
Cromwell starred as Elliot Baines, a former three-term U.S. Senator who loses a re-election for the Senate and goes back home to Seattle to re-establish his relationships with his three grown daughters Ellen (Embeth Davidtz), Reeva (Jane Adams), and Dori (Jacinda Barrett).

== Cast ==
=== Main ===
- James Cromwell as Elliot Baines
- Embeth Davidtz as Ellen Baines Croland
- Jane Adams as Reeva Baines Eidenberg
- Jacinda Barrett as Dori Baines
- Arye Gross as Shel Eidenberg
- Scotty Leavenworth as Otis Croland
- Matt McCoy as Arthur Croland

=== Recurring ===
- Tom Verica as Andy Carlson
- McCaleb Burnett as Claude Waverley
- Easton Gage as Sam Eidenberg
- David Kriegel as David Goldman
- Bryn Lauren Lemon as Ruthie Eidenberg
- Emmett Shoemaker as Otis Croland
- Paul McCrane as Sherman Bloom

== Episodes ==
No.	Title	Directed by	Written by	Original release date	Prod. code
1	"A Day Like No Other"	Christopher Chulack	Lydia Woodward	September 29, 2001	227350
2	"The Whole Thump-Thump-Thump"	Unknown	Unknown	October 6, 2001	227351
3	"Days of Confusion"	Unknown	Unknown	October 13, 2001	227352
4	"Three Days In November"	Unknown	Unknown	October 20, 2001	227353
5	"The Appraisal"	Lesli Linka Glatter	Patty Lin	October 27, 2001	227354
6	"Lost and Found"	Dwight Little	Will Scheffer	November 3, 2001	227355
7	"Out in the Rain"	TBD	TBD	Unaired	227356
8	"A Song That Never Ends"	TBD	TBD	Unaired	227357
9	"Safe at Home"	TBD	TBD	Unaired	227358

== Reception ==
=== Critical ===
PopMatters wrote that, "Citizen Baines showed genuine signs of bucking the CBS feel-good Saturday night orthodoxy, by assuming the complex task of creating family-friendly entertainment without soaking in sentiment the raw textures of domestic life... But Citizen Baines symbolizes the lack of imagination driving so much of prime-time, whether drama or sitcom, cable or network..." USA Today's Robert Bianco gave the series a negative, one-and-a-half star review, and stated, "After all, the only interesting thing about Elliott Baines is his job as a U.S. senator — and he loses that at the end of Saturday's premiere. Don't worry: I'm not revealing anything that the "citizen" in the title didn't already tell you."

=== Ratings ===
Scheduled on Saturdays following Touched by an Angel, the series ranked #90 (the lowest rank for a regularly scheduled series on one of the Big Four networks), and averaged 8.2 million viewers. Due to the low ratings, CBS canceled the series in October 2001 after six of the nine episodes produced were aired.

=== Award nomination ===
Year	Award	Category	Recipient	Result	Ref
2002	American Society of Cinematographers	Outstanding Achievement in Cinematography in Movies of the Week/Miniseries/Pilot for Network or Basic Broadcast TV	Ernest Holzman (for pilot episode)	Nominated	
