= Southland (TV series) =

American television crime drama series (2009-2013)

- Genre: Crime drama Police procedural
- Created by: Ann Biderman
- Starring: Kevin Alejandro; Arija Bareikis; Michael Cudlitz; Shawn Hatosy; Regina King; Michael McGrady; Ben McKenzie; Tom Everett Scott; C. Thomas Howell
- Theme music composer: Frederico de Brito; Ferrer Trindade
- Opening theme: "Canção do Mar" by Dulce Pontes (instrumental version)
- Country of origin: United States
- Original language: English
- No. of seasons: 5
- No. of episodes: 43 (list of episodes)

Production
- Executive producers: Ann Biderman; Christopher Chulack; John Wells
- Production locations: Los Angeles, California
- Cinematography: J. Michael Muro
- Running time: 43 minutes
- Production companies: John Wells Productions; Warner Bros. Television

Original release
- Network: NBC
- Release: April 9 – May 21, 2009
- Network: TNT
- Release: March 2, 2010 – April 17, 2013

Southland is an American crime drama television series created by writer Ann Biderman and produced by John Wells Productions in association with Warner Bros. Television. The series originally aired on NBC for one season from April 9 to May 21, 2009, and then on TNT for an additional four seasons from March 2, 2010, to April 17, 2013.

In May 2009, NBC announced that Southland had been renewed for a second season with an initial 13-episode order to begin airing on September 25, 2009. In August 2009, shortly before its scheduled premiere, NBC moved the opening of its second season to October 23, 2009, citing the need to promote the show more fully. In October 2009, two weeks before the scheduled premiere of the second season, NBC announced that the series had been canceled after one season.

In November 2009, TNT announced it had purchased the rights to the original seven episodes of Southland, as well as six completed episodes from its second season. Southland began airing its second season on TNT on March 2, 2010. In April 2010, TNT announced it had picked up Southland for a ten-episode third season to begin airing on January 4, 2011. TNT's revival of the show included a substantial budget cut and corresponding cast reduction. Southland was renewed for a ten-episode fourth season in March 2011, which premiered on January 17, 2012. The series was renewed for a ten-episode fifth season which began airing February 13, 2013. In May 2013, TNT announced that Southland had been canceled after five seasons.

== Premise ==
Southland takes a "raw and authentic look" at Los Angeles and the lives of the LAPD officers who police it. The show's first season centers on the experiences and interactions of LAPD patrol officers and detectives, and is more a character-driven drama than a police procedural.

Among the characters are rookie Officer Ben Sherman and his training officer John Cooper, who, unknown to most of his colleagues, is gay; Detective Lydia Adams, who must balance work with the responsibility of living with her mother; Officer Chickie Brown, who aspires to be the first woman on the LAPD's elite SWAT team; and Detective Sammy Bryant, whose home life interferes with his working life.

After its first season on NBC, Southland moved to TNT. The second season placed less emphasis on the ensemble cast, instead focusing more on the Adams, Sherman, Cooper, and Bryant characters and their partners. The weekly stories also centered more on how crimes came together, with fewer serialized story lines.

== Cast and characters ==
=== Main cast ===
Actor	Character	Rank	Notes
Michael Cudlitz	John Cooper	Police Officer III+1 (Seasons 1–5)	Hollywood Division, Officer Sherman's former FTO (Seasons 1–3), Officer Tang's former partner (Season 4), Officer Steele's FTO (Season 5). Senior Lead Officer
Ben McKenzie	Ben Sherman	Police Officer I (Seasons 1–3); Police Officer II (Seasons 4–5)	Hollywood Division, Officer Cooper's former boot; (fictional) Alvarado Division, Officer Bryant's partner
Regina King	Lydia Adams	Detective II (Seasons 1–5)	West Bureau Detectives
Shawn Hatosy	Sammy Bryant	Detective I (Season 1); Detective II (Seasons 2–3); Police Officer III (Seasons 4–5)	Southeast Division Detectives, Detective Moretta's former partner; Alvarado Division, Officer Sherman's partner
C. Thomas Howell	Bill "Dewey" Dudek	Police Officer III (Recurring seasons 1–4, main season 5)	Hollywood Division, Officer Brown's former partner
Kevin Alejandro	Nate Moretta	Detective II (Seasons 1–3)	Southeast Division Detectives, Detective Bryant's former partner, killed in a gang assault in Season 3.
Michael McGrady	Daniel "Sal" Salinger	Detective III (Seasons 1–3)	Southeast Division Detectives, Supervisor
Tom Everett Scott	Russell Clarke	Detective II (Season 1, recurring seasons 2–3, 5)	West Bureau Detectives, Detective Adams' former partner
Arija Bareikis	Chickie Brown	Police Officer III (Seasons 1–3)	Hollywood Division, Officer Dudek's former partner; transferred to Metro Division in Season 4

=== Recurring cast ===
Actor	Character	Rank	Notes
Denise Crosby	Susan Salinger	Captain I (Seasons 1–2)	Detective Salinger's wife
Patrick Fischler	Kenny "No-Gun"	Detective I (Seasons 1–2)	Gangs & Narcotics Division
Lex Medlin	Andy Williams	Detective I (Seasons 1–2)	Gangs & Narcotics Division
L. Scott Caldwell	Enid Adams	— (Seasons 1–5)	Detective Adams' mother
Emily Bergl	Tammi Bryant	— (Seasons 1–5)	Detective Bryant's ex-wife
Yara Martinez	Mariella Moretta	— (Seasons 1–3)	Detective Moretta's wife
Hedy Burress	Laurie Cooper	— (Seasons 1–3, 5)	Officer Cooper's ex-wife
Roxana Brusso	Alicia Fernandez	Detective III (Seasons 1–5)	West Bureau Detectives, Detective Adams' supervisor
Amaury Nolasco	Rene Cordero	Detective I (Season 2)	West Bureau Detectives, Detective Adams' interim partner
Laz Alonso	Gil Puente	Detective II (Seasons 2–3)	Gang Task Force Detective, with Detectives Bryant & Moretta
Mario Cortez	Officer Munoz	Police Officer III (Seasons 2–5)	Division within West Bureau
Jenny Gago	Josie Ochoa	Detective II (Season 3)	West Bureau Detectives, Detective Adams' former partner
Bokeem Woodbine	Officer Jones	Police Officer III (Seasons 3–4)	Alvarado Division
Jamie McShane	Terry Hill	Sergeant I (Seasons 3–5)	Hollywood Division, Supervisor
Jack Forbes	Dell Cooper	— (Seasons 3, 5)	Officer Cooper's father
Lucy Liu	Jessica Tang	Police Officer III; Sergeant I (Season 4)	Hollywood Division, Officer Cooper's former partner; West Los Angeles Division, Supervisor in Season 4 (episode 10)
Dorian Missick	Ruben Robinson	Detective I (Seasons 4–5)	West Bureau Detectives, Detective Adams' current partner
Lou Diamond Phillips	Danny Ferguson	Police Officer III (Season 4)	Alvarado Division
Carl Lumbly	Joel Rucker	Captain I (Season 4)	Alvarado Division Commanding Officer
Chad Michael Murray	Dave Mendoza	Police Officer II (Season 5)	Alvarado Division
Lesley Fera	Sgt. Waters	Sergeant I (Season 5)	Alvarado Division Supervisor
Derek Ray	Gary Steele	Police Officer I (Season 5)	Hollywood Division. Officer Cooper's "boot"
Anthony Ruivivar	Hank Lucero	Police Officer III (Season 5)	Hollywood Division, Officer Cooper's partner; killed on duty

== Production ==
The series was created by Emmy Award-winning writer Ann Biderman, who began her television writing career on the first season of police drama NYPD Blue. The series' executive producers are Biderman, Christopher Chulack, and John Wells. Wells and Chulack, both also Emmy Award winners, had previously worked together on critically acclaimed medical drama ER and emergency services drama Third Watch. Many other crew members had previously worked with Wells and Chulack on these series. Wells and Biderman also write for the series and Chulack is a regular director. Biderman left her executive producer position after the second season but continued to write for the series' third season.

Ex-police officer Angela Amato Velez served as a consulting producer and writer for the first season; she had previously worked for the executive producers on Third Watch. Dee Johnson also served as a consulting producer and writer for the first season; she had previously worked with Wells and Chulack on ER. Emmy Award-winning writing team Mitchell Burgess & Robin Green were hired as executive consultants and writers for the second and third seasons; they had previously worked together as executive producers on The Sopranos. Diana Son served as a consulting producer and writer for the second season; she had previously worked on the crime drama Law & Order: Criminal Intent.

David Graziano became a co-executive producer for the second season. Andrew Stearn was a producer for the first two seasons and was promoted to co-executive producer for the third season; he had previously worked on Third Watch. Jonathan Lisco was hired as a co-executive producer for the third season; he is a former lawyer and created the New Orleans police drama K-Ville. Jason Horwitch, creator of AMC's Rubicon, joined the show as consulting producer for the fourth season.

ER and Third Watch veteran Nelson McCormick is also a regular director for Southland. Steadicam expert J. Michael Muro serves as a regular cinematographer and occasional director for the series. Dana Gonzales is the other regular director of photography.

The producers used both actual and former gang members to play the role of gang bangers in Southland.

== Episodes ==
Season	Episodes	Originally released		
Season	Episodes	First released	Last released	Network
1	7	April 9, 2009	May 21, 2009	NBC
2	6	March 2, 2010	April 6, 2010	TNT
3	10	January 4, 2011	March 8, 2011	TNT
4	10	January 17, 2012	March 20, 2012	TNT
5	10	February 13, 2013	April 17, 2013	TNT

== Reception ==
Southland received positive reviews from critics. At Metacritic, which assigns a weighted mean rating out of 100 to reviews from mainstream critics, the first season received an average score of 69, based on 22 reviews and the second season received an average score of 77, based on 12 reviews both indicating "generally favorable reviews". Upon returning for its third, fourth and fifth seasons, the series received wide critical acclaim, receiving an average score of 80, based on 9 reviews for the third season, an average score of 87, based on 7 reviews for the fourth season, and an average score of 86, based on 9 reviews, all indicating "universal acclaim".

Alessandra Stanley of The New York Times compared Southland favorably to series like The Shield, Rescue Me and The Wire in citing the series debut as "one of the most gripping opening episodes of any network crime series". Noting the show's "bold, contemporary tone", Stanley concluded that "Southland is commendably stinting and cold, a series that doesn't aim to please, and is all the more pleasurable for it." In a second review a year later, Mike Hale was less effusive in his praise. While commending the series for fine performances from its cast and its combination of straightforward immediate plots and long-range storytelling, Hale criticized the "heavyhandedness" he saw in some of the writing, noting especially the "sententious lectures about the nature of police work" delivered to Sherman by Cooper in the pilot episode. He finds the show "worthy" but in need of work to qualify as a classic.

Dorothy Rabinowitz of The Wall Street Journal says "Prattle is, in any case, a minor note compared with the crackling pace of the first script, its evocative mood of menace at every turn, each police car racing to destinations that will reveal who knows what tragedy or unspeakable sight." Matt Zoller Seitz of Vulture applauded the series' realism, and stated "It's the most engrossing cop series since season one of NBC's Homicide, and maybe the most raggedy and real."

Southland received three nominations for the Primetime Emmy Award for Outstanding Stunt Coordination, winning the award twice in 2011 and 2012, and was nominated in 2013. In 2012, the series was awarded with a Peabody Award.

== Home media and streaming ==
Shortly before its TNT premiere, Warner Home Video released the first season on DVD in an uncensored version, with the profanities intact.

In May 2011, Warner Home Video also released the second season in a similarly uncensored version. This title is currently only available through the studio's manufacture-on-demand (MOD) program.

On February 5, 2013, a box set titled Southland: The Complete Second, Third, and Fourth Seasons was released on DVD; it included over an hour of bonus features.

On August 13, 2013, Warner Home Video released the show's final season on DVD.

Netflix began streaming all five seasons on January 16, 2026.

DVD name	Region 1 release date	Region 2 release date	Region 4 release date	No. of episodes	Discs	Bonus features
Season 1	January 26, 2010	September 26, 2011	April 17, 2013	7	2	"Southland: Redefining the Cop Drama" featurette
Season 2	May 24, 2011	September 26, 2011	April 17, 2013	6	2	"A Crime Tour: Southland's Crime Map" featurette; "Backing the Badge: Selected Scene Commentary" featurette; unaired scenes
Season 3	February 5, 2013	August 12, 2013	August 14, 2013	10	3	Unaired scenes
Season 4	February 5, 2013	August 12, 2013	August 14, 2013	10	3	Unaired scenes
Season 5	August 13, 2013	N/A	June 25, 2014	10	2	"Shooting in Progress" featurette; unaired scenes
