= John Wells (filmmaker) =

American producer, writer and director (born 1956)

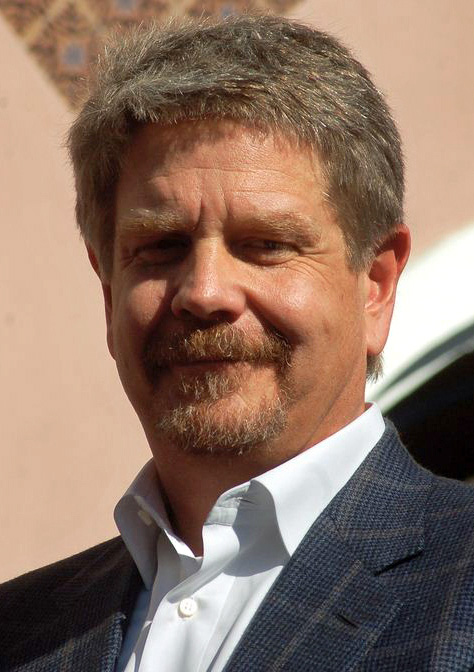
- Wells in 2012
- Born: John Marcum Wells; May 28, 1956 (age 70); Alexandria, Virginia, U.S.
- Education: Carnegie Mellon University (BFA); University of Southern California (MFA)
- Occupations: Producer; screenwriter; director
- Years active: 1987–present
- Spouse: Marilyn Wells

John Marcum Wells (born May 28, 1956) is an American producer, screenwriter, and director. He is best known for his role as showrunner and executive producer of the television series ER, Third Watch, The West Wing, Southland, Shameless, Animal Kingdom, The Pitt, and American Woman, as well as the miniseries Maid. He was the developer of the series Shameless, which ran for 11 seasons, from 2011 to 2021, on Showtime. His company, John Wells Productions, is currently based at Warner Bros. studios in Burbank, California. He served twice as president of the Writers Guild of America, West (1999–2001 and 2009–2011), and currently serves on the board of governors of the Motion Picture & Television Fund (MPTF).

== Early life ==
Wells was born in Alexandria, Virginia, the son of Marjorie Elizabeth (née Risberg) and Llewellyn Wallace Wells, Jr., an Episcopalian minister. He has English, Irish, Scottish, Swedish, and Norwegian ancestry. Wells graduated from the Carnegie Mellon School of Drama in 1979. (A studio theatre at Carnegie Mellon University now bears his name.) While a student at CMU, he became one of the earliest actors to work at City Theatre, a prominent fixture of Pittsburgh theatre.

== Career ==
=== Television ===
In 1986, Wells’s company, John Wells Productions (originally John Wells & Friends) began a longstanding relationship with Warner Bros., one of the most successful television producers in the world. He was a producer on the film Nice Girls Don't Explode (1987), joined the writing staff of the short-lived CBS drama series Shell Game in 1987, and began writing for television with an episode of CBS Summer Playhouse (entitled "Roughhouse") in 1988.

==== China Beach ====
Also in 1988, he was hired as a producer for the second season of the ABC drama series China Beach. The show was created by John Sacret Young and William Broyles, Jr. and focused on combat medics in the Vietnam War. Wells wrote five episodes for the show’s second season and both episodes of the two-part season finale, "The World".

In 1989, Wells was promoted to supervising producer of the third season of China Beach and wrote three of that season’s episodes. In 1990, he returned as a co-executive producer of the show’s fourth (and final) season, and was involved in writing 11 of that season’s episodes, including the series finale.

In his time working on China Beach, Wells worked frequently with producer/director Mimi Leder, and she directed six of the episodes he wrote. China Beach also marked the start of Wells's working relationship with casting director John Frank Levey, editors Randy Jon Morgan and Jacque Toberen and directors Rod Holcomb and Fred Gerber.

==== TV movies ====
In 1992, Wells co-wrote the teleplay of The Nightman, helping to adapt it into a television film from the radio drama by Lucille Fletcher. It tells the story of a young man moving into a hotel that is run by a mother and daughter. Wells was also the film’s co-executive producer; it was directed by Charles Haid.

That same year, Wells wrote and executive-produced another television film: Angel Street, a project that reunited him with several members of the China Beach team, including director Rod Holcomb, editor Jacque Toberen, and casting director John Frank Levey. That telefilm was followed by a series, on which Wells continued as an executive producer. He also wrote the screenplay for Entertaining Angels: The Dorothy Day Story; that project was produced in 1996 and starred Martin Sheen and Moira Kelly.

==== ER ====
In 1994, Wells executive-produced the pilot of the NBC medical drama ER, created by novelist Michael Crichton. It was directed by Rod Holcomb (one of Wells’s frequent collaborators), and edited by Randy Jon Morgan (who had edited several China Beach episodes), with John Frank Levey serving as a casting director (as he had for China Beach).

When the pilot was picked up and the show became a series, Wells served as show runner and head writer. He was credited as an executive producer for all 15 seasons of the series and served as the show runner for the first six seasons. He hired China Beach writer Lydia Woodward as a supervising producer and writer. China Beach director Mimi Leder also became a supervising producer and regular director. ER marked the start of Wells longstanding collaboration with producer/director Christopher Chulack and music composer Martin Davich.

Wells wrote five episodes of the first season and he and the producers were nominated for an Emmy Award for Outstanding Drama Series at the 1995 ceremony for their work on the first season. The season was nominated for 23 Emmy Awards and won 8 in total. Wells and Michael Crichton won a Producers Guild of America Award at the 1994 ceremony. Wells and Crichton also received an honorable mention at the Wise Owl Awards in the Television and Theatrical Film Fiction category.

Wells remained show runner for the second season in 1995. He hired his China Beach colleague Carol Flint as a co-executive producer for the second season. Wells wrote four more episodes for the second season and he and the producers won the Emmy Award for Outstanding Drama Series at the 1996 ceremony for their work on the second season. Wells was also nominated for a Humanitas Prize (in the 60-minute category) and an Emmy Award for Outstanding Writing for a Drama Series for the episode "The Healers".

Wells remained the head writer for the third season in 1996 and wrote three episodes. Wells and the producers were nominated for the Emmy Award for Outstanding Drama Series at the 1997 ceremony for their work on the third season. Wells was again nominated for the Emmy Award for Outstanding Writing for a Drama Series for the episode "Faith".

He continued in the same capacity for the fourth season in 1997 and wrote two further episodes. Wells also made his television directing debut with his screenplay "Carter's Choice". Wells and the producers were nominated for the Emmy Award for Outstanding Drama Series at the 1998 ceremony for their work on the fourth season.

Wells returned as head writer for the fifth season in 1998. He wrote both parts of the two-part episode "The Storm" and also directed the first part. Wells and the producers were once again nominated for the Emmy Award for Outstanding Drama Series at the 1999 ceremony for their work on the fifth season. Wells stood down as show runner after the fifth season but remained an executive producer and major creative force behind the series. In the 1999–2000 TV season his company Wells productions launched two new series The West Wing and Third Watch.

Woodward took over as show runner for the sixth season but Wells wrote "The Peace of Wild Things" and wrote and directed "Such Sweet Sorrow". Wells and the producers were once again nominated for the Emmy Award for Outstanding Drama Series at the 2000 ceremony for their work on the sixth season but lost out to Wells's other show The West Wing. Wells was nominated for the Emmy Award for Outstanding Directing for a Drama Series for his work on "Such Sweet Sorrow". He was also nominated for the 2000 PGA Vision Award for his work on ER, Third Watch and The West Wing.

Wells continued to write for the seventh season and contributed to two episodes. Wells was nominated for a Humanitas Prize for his work on "A Walk in the Woods". Wells and the producers were once again nominated for the Emmy Award for Outstanding Drama Series at the 2001 ceremony for their work on the seventh season and were again beaten by Wells's other series The West Wing.

For the eighth season Wells wrote two episodes, including the penultimate episode "On the Beach" which featured the departure of longterm cast member Anthony Edwards. Wells was nominated for the Emmy Award for Outstanding Writing for a Drama Series for his work on "On the Beach" at the 2002 ceremony. He was also nominated for a further Humanitas Prize and a Writers Guild of America (WGA) Award at the 2003 ceremony for the episode.

For the ninth season Wells wrote the final episode "Kisangani".

He returned in fall 2003 to write three episodes. Wells was again nominated for a Humanitas Prize, this time for his work on "Makemba".

He continued to handle Carter's storylines for the eleventh season and wrote the penultimate episode "Carter est Amoureux" and directed the finale "The Show Must Go On" which marked the departure of Noah Wyle (who played Carter) from the starring cast.

For the twelfth season Wells co-wrote the premiere episode. Wells served solely as an executive producer and director on the thirteenth and fourteenth seasons, directing one episode in each season.

He returned as a writer for the fifteenth and final season and wrote and directed the episode "Old Times" which featured several past starring cast members including Noah Wyle, George Clooney, Julianna Margulies, and Eriq La Salle.

When ER ended in 2009, Wells had written 31 episodes, and directed 7.

==== Trinity ====
Wells Productions also produced Trinity, a short lived NBC family drama focusing on an Irish-American family in Hell's Kitchen. Wells served as an executive producer and writer for the series but it was cancelled after only nine episodes due to low ratings. The series won an Emmy Award for composer Martin Davich's music. Davich also worked on ER. The show starred John Spencer, Tate Donovan and Kim Raver. It also featured Third Watch actors Bobby Cannavale, Skipp Sudduth, and Molly Price.

==== Third Watch ====
Wells co-created Third Watch with ex-Chicago police officer Edward Allen Bernero. Wells worked as show runner on Third Watch for its first three seasons and served as an executive producer throughout its six-season run. The series focused on emergency services workers across a single shift in New York. The first season began in 1999. Wells and Bernero co-wrote the pilot episode "Welcome to Camelot".

Wells also wrote the first-season episodes "Sunny, Like Sunshine", "This Band of Brothers", "Spring Forward, Fall Back", and the first-season finale "Young Men and Fire".

Wells wrote four second-season episodes the premiere entitled "The Lost", "Faith", "Requiem for a Bantamweight", and the finale "...and Zeus Wept". Wells directed the second-season episode "True Love".

Wells wrote a further four episodes for the third season in 2001 – "September Tenth", "After Time", "Adam 55-3", and "Two Hundred and Thirty-Three Days". Bernero took over as show runner after the third season and Wells remained attached as an executive producer until Third Watch ended in 2005 but did not write any more episodes.

==== The West Wing ====
Wells took over as show runner of The West Wing in 2003 for the fifth season. He ran the show for three seasons until its conclusion in 2006.

==== Southland ====
During the 2008 to 2009 television season Wells developed Southland for NBC. The series was created by Ann Biderman. It follows detectives and patrol officers in the titular area of Los Angeles. Wells returned as an executive producer for the second season in fall 2009 and co-wrote the season premiere "Phase Three" with Biderman. NBC canceled the series while the second season was in production but the episodes were picked up and aired by TNT.

TNT renewed the series for a third season and Wells remained an executive producer and writer. He again co-wrote the season premiere "Let It Snow" with Biderman. He also wrote the teleplay for the season finale "Graduation Day" from a story by his ex-assistant Heather Zuhlke.

==== Animal Kingdom ====
Wells was a producer, writer and director on the TNT crime drama Animal Kingdom from 2016 to 2022. He received a writing credit on five episodes and directed 10 episodes, including the pilot and the series finale. Based on the Australian movie Animal Kingdom (2010).

==== Shameless ====
In 2009, Wells began work on an American adaptation of the British series Shameless. Originally commissioned by HBO, the project moved to competing network Showtime, where it debuted in January 2011.

Starring William H. Macy as an alcoholic single father of six children, Shameless was the best performing first-year drama in Showtime's history. Shameless ran for 11 seasons.

==== Other projects ====
Other projects from Wells include the unsold pilots to Bad Girls on NBC, Prodigy Bully for Fox and The Deep Mad Dark for TNT, American Woman for Paramount Network and the miniseries Maid for Netflix. In June 2019, Wells signed an overall deal to stay at Warner Bros. Television with two more shows in the works: Heart of a Lion from Showtime and My Ex-Life for Apple TV+.

He was slated to produce the pilot for the psychological thriller Red Bird Lane for HBO Max. However, the streamer ultimately chose not to move forward with the project. Wells is currently working on a pair of dramas from Warner Bros. Television: Ke Nui Road and the anthology series take on the book Things That Make White People Uncomfortable for HBO Max.

On April 28, 2023, it was announced that Fox has given a straight-to-series order for Rescue: HI-Surf. The series was co-produced by Wells and Fox Entertainment. Wells served as an executive producer and directed the first two episodes of the series. It was created by Matt Kester, who also serves as a writer. In April 2024, Fox placed the show on a seven-episode back order. The series went on to premiere on the channel in September 2024. The series been cancelled after a single season.

In April 2023, MGM+ ordered ten episodes of the series The Emperor of Ocean Park based on Stephen L. Carter's best-selling novel of the same name, with Sherman Payne as the writer and Damian Marcano set to direct. The series stars Grantham Coleman, Forest Whitaker and Tiffany Mack. It premiered on July 14, 2024.

Wells serves as an executive producer on the medical drama series The Pitt for the streaming service Max (later HBO Max), as well as the Netflix series Untamed.

=== Film ===
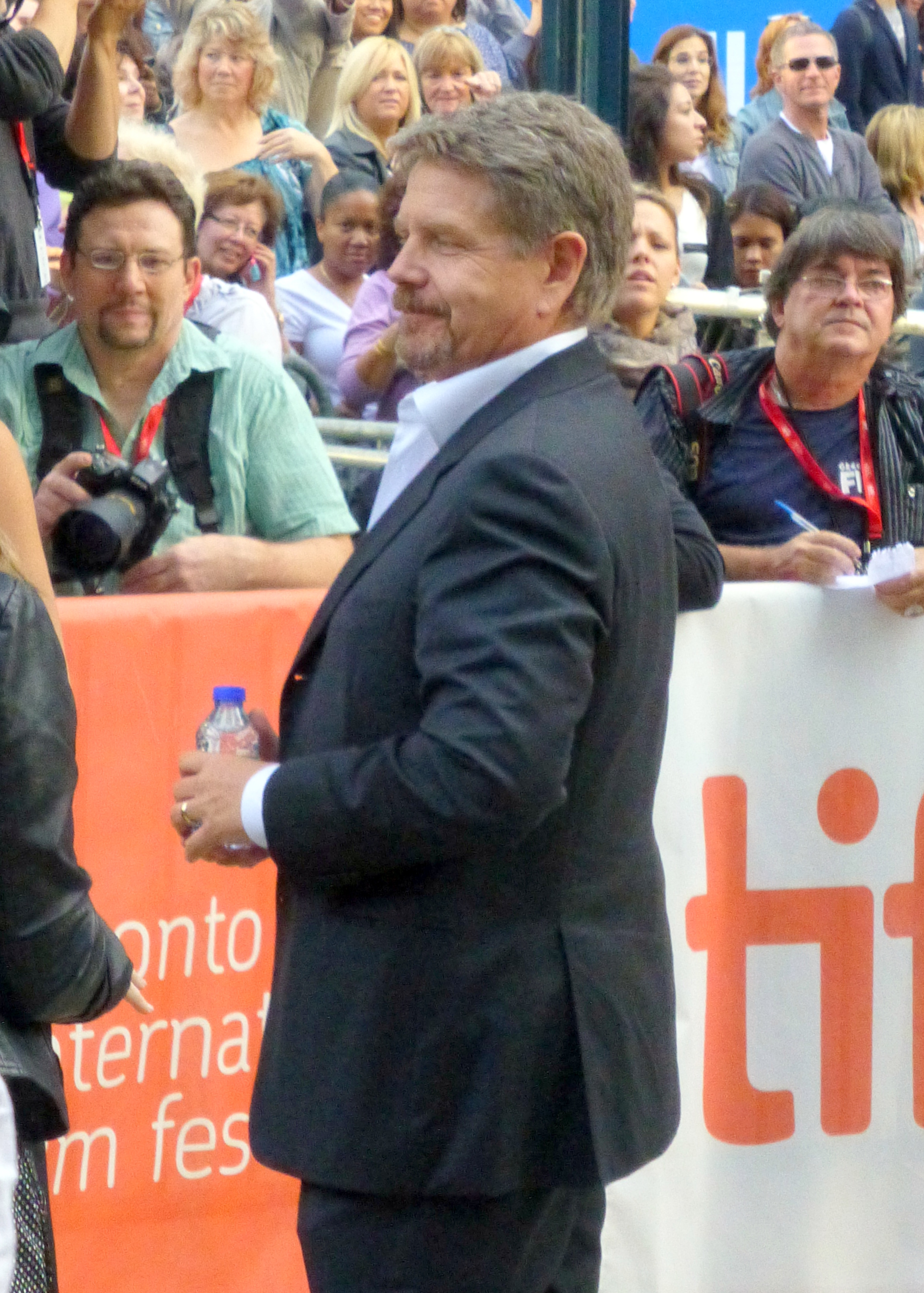
Wells at the 2013 Toronto Film Festival

==== The Company Men ====
Wells made his directorial debut with the film drama The Company Men, starring Ben Affleck. The film was scheduled for release in the fall of 2010 but premiered earlier at the Sundance film festival. After the Sundance screening, The Hollywood Reporter said, "Wells has made, for his first film, a tough movie and certainly not a commercial one. This displays the kind of guts he always brought to his television work, which one can only hope continues on in other future film projects."

==== August: Osage County ====
His second film, August: Osage County (2013), which he directed from a script by Tracy Letts, stars Meryl Streep, Julia Roberts, and Ewan McGregor. The Weinstein Company released the film in December 2013. The film was nominated for two Academy Awards® including Best Performance by an Actress in a Leading Role (Streep) and Best Performance by an Actress in a Supporting Role (Roberts).

==== Love and Mercy ====
He next produced Love and Mercy the critically acclaimed biopic about the Beach Boys, starring Paul Dano, John Cusack, Paul Giamatti and Elizabeth Banks. The film originally premiered at the Toronto International Film Festival in September 2014.

==== Burnt ====
Wells directed the cooking drama film Burnt, previously titled Chef and Adam Jones, in which Bradley Cooper starred as a Paris chef named Adam Jones. Sienna Miller co-starred, along with Omar Sy, Emma Thompson, Daniel Brühl, Alicia Vikander, and Lily James.

== Filmography ==
=== Film ===
Year	Title	Director	Producer	Writer
1987	Nice Girls Don't Explode	No	Yes	No
1996	Entertaining Angels: The Dorothy Day Story	No	No	Yes
2002	The Good Thief	No	Yes	No
2002	White Oleander	No	Yes	No
2004	A Home at the End of the World	No	Yes	No
2005	Duma	No	Yes	No
2005	Doom	No	Yes	No
2010	The Company Men	Yes	Yes	Yes
2013	August: Osage County	Yes	No	No
2014	Love & Mercy	No	Yes	No
2015	Burnt	Yes	Yes	No

==== Executive producer only ====
Year	Title	Notes
1997	The Peacemaker	Co-executive producer
2001	The Grey Zone	
2002	One Hour Photo	
2002	Far from Heaven	
2003	Party Monster	
2003	Camp	
2003	The Company	
2004	A Dirty Shame	
2005	Nearing Grace	
2005	The Notorious Bettie Page	
2006	Infamous	
2007	An American Crime	
2007	Savage Grace	
2007	I'm Not There	
2007	Then She Found Me	
2008	Gigantic	
2009	Motherhood	
2009	Cracks	
2010	Dirty Girl	
2014	Electric Slide	
2016	Goat	
2019	Doom: Annihilation	

=== Television ===
The numbers in directing and writing credits refer to the number of episodes.

Key
†	Denotes television programs that have not yet aired.

Year	Title	Creator	Director	Writer	Executive producer	Network	Notes
1987	Shell Game	No	No	Yes (2)	No	CBS	
1987	Ohara	No	No	Yes (1)	No	ABC	
1988–91	China Beach	No	No	Yes (18)	No	ABC	Producer (season 2); Supervising producer (season 3); Co-executive producer (season 4)
1988	CBS Summer Playhouse: Roughhouse	No	No	Yes (1)	No	CBS	Unsold pilot
1992	The Nightman	—N/a	No	Yes	No	NBC	Television film Co-executive producer
1992	Angel Street	Yes	No	Yes (3)	Yes	CBS	
1994–2009	ER	No	Yes (9)	Yes (31)	Yes	NBC	Showrunner (seasons 1-6)
1998	The Adversaries	No	No	Yes	Yes	NBC	Unsold pilot
1998	Trinity	No	No	Yes (1)	Yes	NBC	
1999–2006	The West Wing	No	No	Yes (10)	Yes	NBC	Showrunner (seasons 5-7)
1999–2005	Third Watch	Yes	No	Yes (14)	Yes	NBC	Showrunner
2001	Citizen Baines	No	No	Yes (Note: Unknown episodes.)	Yes	CBS	
2002	The Court	No	No	No	Yes	ABC	
2002	The Big Time	—N/a	No	No	Yes	TNT	Television film
2002–03	Presidio Med	Yes	No	Yes (2)	Yes	CBS	
2003	The FBI Files	No	Yes (1)	No	No	Discovery Channel	Docudrama
2004	Dark Shadows	No	No	No	Yes	The WB	Unsold pilot
2005	Jonny Zero	No	No	No	Yes	Fox	
2005	Mrs. Harris	—N/a	No	No	Yes	HBO	Television film
2006	Prodigy/Bully	Yes	No	No	Yes	NBC	Unsold pilot
2006	The Evidence	No	No	No	No	ABC	Producer
2006	Smith	Yes	No	Yes (3)	Yes	CBS	
2009–13	Southland	No	No	Yes (3)	Yes	NBC; TNT	
2010	Gimme Shelter	No	No	No	Yes	CBS	Unsold pilot
2011–21	Shameless	Developer	Yes (10)	Yes (24)	Yes	Showtime	
2011	Mildred Pierce	No	No	No	Yes	HBO	Miniseries
2012	Prodigy Bully	Yes	No	No	Yes	Fox	Unsold pilot
2012	Bad Girls	No	No	No	Yes	NBC	Unsold pilot
2013	Boomerang	No	No	No	Yes	Fox	Unsold pilot
2013	Outbreak	Yes	No	Yes	Yes	NBC	Put pilot
2014	The Devil's Advocate	No	No	No	Yes	NBC	Put pilot
2015	Studio City	No	No	No	Yes	Fox	Unsold pilot
2016–22	Animal Kingdom	No	Yes (10)	Yes (5)	Yes	TNT	
2016	Hinges	No	No	No	Yes	TNT	Unsold pilot
2016	Flight Risk	No	No	No	Yes	NBC	Put pilot
2017	The Deep Mad Dark	No	No	No	Yes	TNT	Unsold pilot
2018	American Woman	No	No	No	Yes	Paramount Network	
2020	Red Bird Lane	No	No	No	Yes	HBO Max	Unsold Pilot
2020–21	Shameless Hall of Shame	Developer	No	No	No	Showtime	
2021	Maid	No	Yes (4)	No	Yes	Netflix	Miniseries
2024–present	The Emperor of Ocean Park	No	No	No	Yes	MGM+	
2024–25	Rescue: HI-Surf	No	Yes (2)	No	Yes	Fox	
2025–present	The Pitt	No	Yes (4)	No	Yes	HBO Max	
2025–present	Untamed	No	No	No	Yes	Netflix	

== Awards and nominations ==
John Wells Productions won a Peabody Award in 1999 and 2000 for The West Wing and again in 2001 for Third Watch's '"In Their Own Words," which told the stories of real-life responders to the 9/11 attack on New York City.

John Wells has been nominated for twenty-eight Emmy Awards and received eight wins including Outstanding Drama Series (1996 for ER, 2000, 2001, 2002 and 2003 for The West Wing, and 2025 and 2026 for The Pitt) and Outstanding Special Class Program in 2002 for The West Wing Documentary Special.

Wells has been nominated for six Producers Guild Awards and won three awards for his work on The West Wing and ER. He was honored with the Vision Award in 2000 as well as the Lifetime Achievement Award in Television in 2005.

In addition, Wells has been nominated for seven Writers Guild Awards and won the Directors Guild Diversity Award in 1997.

On May 18, 2014, Wells received an honorary Doctor of Fine Arts degree from Carnegie Mellon University, where he graduated from in 1979.
