= Jennifer Grant =

American actress (born 1966)

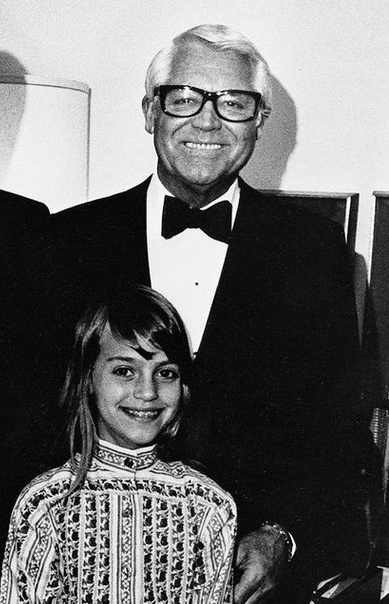
- Jennifer and her father Cary Grant in 1976 at the Century Plaza Hotel, Los Angeles
- Born: Jennifer Diane Grant; February 26, 1966 (age 60); Burbank, California, U.S.
- Education: Stanford University
- Occupation: Actress
- Years active: 1993–present
- Spouse: Randy Zisk (m. 1993; div. 1996)
- Children: 2
- Parents: Cary Grant (father); Dyan Cannon (mother)
- Relatives: David Friesen (uncle)

Jennifer Diane Grant (born February 26, 1966) is an American actress. The daughter of actors Cary Grant and Dyan Cannon, she is best known for roles in the television series Beverly Hills, 90210 and Movie Stars.

== Early life ==
Grant was born on February 26, 1966, at Saint Joseph Medical Center in Burbank, California, to actors Dyan Cannon and Cary Grant. Her parents divorced when she was two years old. Jennifer had a close relationship with her father for the rest of his life.

Partly because her father did not want her to become an actress, she tried other things for several years. As a teenager during high school at Santa Catalina School in Monterey and on break from college, she worked as a babysitter, stock clerk at the Village store in Pacific Palisades, grocery store checkout cashier at the Rainbow Grocery in Malibu, and waitress at the Pioneer Boulangerie restaurant in Santa Monica. After graduating from Stanford University in 1987 with a degree in American Studies, she worked for a law firm, and followed that with a job as a chef at Wolfgang Puck's Spago restaurant in Beverly Hills. When her father died in 1986, he left her half of his $60 million estate; the other half of the estate went to her stepmother Barbara Harris.

== Career ==
In 1993, seven years after her father's death, Grant played her first acting role in the Aaron Spelling television drama Beverly Hills, 90210, in the recurring role of Celeste Lundy. She appeared as a guest star in a variety of shows including Friends and Ellen, and appeared in several movies, including The Evening Star (1996). In 1999, she was the lead actress in the WB television sitcom Movie Stars.

Grant's memoir, Good Stuff: A Reminiscence of My Father, Cary Grant (2011), is a portrait of her relationship with her father, who was 62 when she was born and who died 20 years later. The title refers to a favorite expression of his, said in reference to things he approved of or situations he was happy about.

== Personal life ==
Grant has two children. She was married to director Randy Zisk from 1993 to 1996.

Grant has volunteered as an actress and mentor with the Young Storytellers Foundation.

== Filmography ==
=== Film ===
Year	Title	Role	Notes
1996	Savage	Nicky Carter	
1996	The Evening Star	Ellen	
1998	Erasable You	Stephanie	
1998	My Engagement Party	Noa Roth	
2000	The View from the Swing	Jocelyn Whitaker	
2005	Going Shopping	Quinn	
2005	Welcome to California	Actress / Jennifer	
2015	Little Loopers	Attorney Landers	
2015	Ghost Squad	Carol	
2015	Christmas Trade	Trish	Video
2017	Becoming Cary Grant	Herself	Documentary
2022	Babylon	Mildred Yates	
2025	A Big Bold Beautiful Journey	David’s mother	

=== Television ===
Year	Title	Role	Notes
1993	Moon Over Miami	Susie Knight	Episode: "Careless Dentist Blues"
1993–1994	Beverly Hills, 90210	Celeste Lundy	Recurring role (8 episodes)
1994	Robin's Hoods		Episode: "To Heir Is Human"
1994	Time Trax	Linda	Episode: "The Crash"
1995	Super Dave's Vegas Spectacular	Sandi Cosgrove	TV series
1995	Friends	Nina Bookbinder	Episode: "The One with Two Parts: Part 1"
1997	Chicago Sons	Jane	Episode: "To Have and to Hold"
1997	Walker, Texas Ranger	Ellen Jordan Garrett	Episode: "Days Past"
1997	Ellen	Erin	Episode: "Roommates"
1998	Guys Like Us	Leah	Episode: "Maestro's First Crush"
1999–2000	Movie Stars	Jacey Wyatt	Main role (21 episodes)
2006	CSI: Crime Scene Investigation	Sedona Wylie	Episode: "Spellbound"
2007	My Daughter's Secret	Denise	Television film
