= Christopher Chulack =

American television producer and director

- Occupations: Television director and producer
- Years active: 1991–present

Christopher Chulack is an American television producer and director, best known for his work on the NBC drama series ER (1995–2008), along with Michael Crichton, also Third Watch (1999–2005), which he co-produced along with Edward Allen Bernero, as well as Southland (2009–2013), which he created. He also produced TNT drama series Animal Kingdom (2016–2022) and on CBS series SEAL Team (2017–2024). He has worked extensively on ER and has won several awards.

== Career ==
=== ER ===
Chulack began working on the NBC medical drama ER as a director and producer with the first season. He was promoted to co-executive producer midway through the third season. Chulack became an executive producer during the fifth season, but relinquished the position in the sixth season in order to focus on the development of Third Watch. He remained a consulting producer on ER until he returned to the position of executive producer at the start of the tenth season. Chulack was an executive producer from the tenth season until the series ended with the fifteenth season. He continued to regularly direct episodes throughout the series run and has helmed a total of 41 episodes as of the close of the fourteenth season.

Chulack and the rest of the producers of ER were nominated for an Emmy award for Outstanding Drama Series for their work on the first season at the 1995 awards. The series won the award the following year and Chulack was personally nominated for the Emmy award for Outstanding Individual Achievement in Directing for a Drama Series for his work on the episode "Hell and High Water". Chulack won the Directors Guild of America (DGA) Award for Outstanding Directorial Achievement in Dramatic Series for his work on "Hell and High Water" in 1996. Chulack won the award again in 1997 for his work on the episode "Fear of Flying" and also received a DGA diversity award along with John Wells for their promotion of a diverse workforce in the television industry.

Chulack was nominated for two prizes at the 1997 Emmy awards - the outstanding drama series award and the directing award. Chulack and the other ER producers were nominated for the Outstanding Drama Series award twice more (in 1998 and 1999). Chulack was personally nominated for the Directing Emmy again in 2004 for his work on the episode "The Lost".

Chulack was also nominated for two further DGA Awards for his directing work on ER. He was nominated in 1998 for the episode "Fathers and Sons" and in 2005 for the episode "Time of Death".

=== Third Watch ===
In 1999 Chulack's fellow ER producer John Wells created Third Watch and enlisted Chulack to direct the pilot episode. Chulack came on board as an executive producer on the series from the pilot until its cancellation at the close of its sixth season in 2005. Chulack directed several episodes of Third Watch and was executive producer for all of its episodes. Due to his pressing duties on Third Watch, Chulack had to cut back on his ER production duties, moving from executive producer to consulting producer. Jonathan Kaplan became ER's producer/director in Chulack's place.

=== Other Wells Production series ===
In 2001 Chulack directed the pilot episode and executive produced Wells Production's next two series Citizen Baines (in 2001) and Presidio Med (in 2002). Both series were short-lived and were cancelled before completing their first seasons.

In 2005 Wells created a new series named Smith and again recruited Chulack to direct the pilot episode. Chulack directed four episodes of Smith and was again credited as an executive producer but the series was cancelled shortly after it began airing. The series star Ray Liotta was also directed by Chulack as a special guest star in the "Time of Death" ER episode that earned Chulack a DGA award nomination.

=== Southland ===
In the 2008 to 2009 television season Chulack developed the police drama series Southland for NBC. He worked with writing partner John Wells and creator Ann Biderman. Chulack, Wells and Biderman were executive producer for the first season and Chulack directed the pilot episode "Unknown Trouble". The series was picked up and aired as a midseason replacement. Chulack directed the episodes "See the Woman", "Sally in the Alley" and the season finale "Derailed".

The series was renewed for a second season and Chulack remained an executive producer and regular director. He helmed the season premiere "Phase Three" and the episode "U-Boat". NBC canceled the series before any episodes from the second season had aired. The six produced episodes were picked up by TNT and aired as the second season. TNT renewed the series for a third season and Chulack returned in the same role. He directed the season premiere "Let It Snow", the episodes "Punching Water", "The Winds" (which featured the departure of starring cast member Kevin Alejandro), "Fixing A Hole" and the season finale "Graduation Day".

=== SEAL Team ===
In 2017, Chulack became executive producer and director of the CBS drama SEAL Team starring David Boreanaz, who appeared in Buffy the Vampire Slayer spin-off series Angel and Fox series Bones.

== Filmography ==
=== Television ===
Year	Series	Director	Writer	Producer	Executive Producer	Notes
1993	Homefront	Yes	No	Yes	No	1 episode
1995–2008	ER	Yes	Yes	Yes	Yes	Directed 43 episodes 3 nominations, Primetime Emmy Award for Outstanding Directing for a Drama Series; 2 wins, 4 nominations, Directors Guild of America Award for Outstanding Directing – Drama Series; Executive producer 324 episodes
1999–2004	Third Watch	Yes	No	No	Yes	Directed 15 episodes Executive producer 132 episodes
2000	Citizen Baines	No	No	No	Yes	3 episodes
2002	Presidio Med	Yes	No	No	Yes	3 episodes
2006–2007	Smith	Yes	No	No	Yes	Directed 4 episodes Executive producer 1 episode
2009–2013	Southland	Yes	No	No	Yes	Directed 17 episodes Executive producer 43 episodes
2012–2017	Longmire	Yes	No	No	Yes	Directed 8 episodes Executive producer 1 episode
2014–2021	Shameless	Yes	No	No	Yes	Directed 11 episodes Executive producer 36 episodes
2016–2018	Animal Kingdom	Yes	No	No	Yes	Directed 5 episodes Executive producer 22 episodes
2017–2024	SEAL Team	Yes	No	No	Yes	Directed 24 episodes Executive producer 100 episodes
2026	Marshals	Yes	No	No	No	Directed 5 episodes
