= Ann Biderman =

American film and television writer

- Born: August 15, 1951 (age 74)
- Occupations: Film and television writer and producer
- Years active: 1991–present
- Known for: Southland; Ray Donovan
- Partner: Roger Vadim (1980–1987)

Ann Biderman (born August 15, 1951) is an American film and television writer. She is the creator and executive producer of the NBC/TNT series Southland (2009–2013), and won an Emmy Award for Outstanding Individual Achievement in Writing in a Drama Series for an episode of NYPD Blue. She created, wrote, and produced the Showtime drama Ray Donovan.

== Early years ==
Biderman grew up in a Jewish family in Florida and New York. When she was sixteen, she attended boarding school at The Stockbridge School, in the Berkshire Mountains in Massachusetts, where she was very interested in the arts.

Biderman and her sister spent much of their youth in the company of writers, artists and musicians when living at the Chelsea Hotel in New York, where "Leonard Cohen was the boy next door" and her mother Peggy Biderman's home in Miami was a sort of halfway house for civil rights activists recently out of prison. Filmmaker Harry Everett Smith and poet Allen Ginsberg were close family friends.

Biderman lived for most of the 1980s with French filmmaker Roger Vadim.

== Career ==
Biderman adapted the novel Smilla's Sense of Snow into the screenplay of the 1997 movie.

In the 2008–09 television season, Biderman developed the police drama series Southland, which aired as a midseason replacement for NBC. The series focuses on patrol officers and detectives in South Los Angeles.

Biderman wrote the pilot episode, and served as an executive producer for the first season alongside John Wells and Christopher Chulack. She wrote the episodes "Mozambique," "See the Woman," "Sally in the Alley" (with consulting producer Angela Amato Velez) and "Derailed."

Southland was renewed for a second season and Biderman remained an executive producer and writer. NBC reversed the decision and cancelled Southland after six episodes had been produced. The series was then picked up by the TNT network, and the previously produced episodes were aired as the show's second season. Biderman co-wrote the second-season premiere "Phase Three" with Wells and wrote the episode "U-Boat."

TNT renewed the series for a third season but dramatically reduced its production budget. Biderman stepped down as executive producer but remained an executive consultant. She co-wrote the third-season premiere "Let It Snow" with Wells.

Biderman created the Showtime series Ray Donovan in 2013. She served as showrunner during the first season, and wrote several episodes, including the pilot. After the second season, Biderman stepped down as showrunner.

== Filmography ==
Screenplays

Year	Title	Credit	Notes
2009	Public Enemies	Screenplay	
1997	Smilla's Sense of Snow	Screenplay	
1996	Primal Fear	Screenplay	
1995	Copycat	Written by	
1984	American Dreamer	Story	

Production staff

Year	Show	Role	Notes
2019	Ray Donovan	Creator	
2018	Ray Donovan	Creator	
2017	Ray Donovan	Creator	
2016	Ray Donovan	Creator	
2015	Ray Donovan	Creator	
2014	Ray Donovan	Creator, Executive producer, Showrunner	
2013	Ray Donovan	Creator, Executive producer, Showrunner	
2013	Southland	Creator	
2012	Southland	Creator	
2011	Southland	Creator	
2010	Southland	Creator, Executive producer	
2009	Southland	Creator, Executive producer	

Writer

Year	Show	Season	Episode title	Episode	Notes
2014	Ray Donovan	2	"The Captain"	12	
2014	Ray Donovan	2	"Walk This Way"	7	
2014	Ray Donovan	2	"Uber Ray"	2	Co-written with David Hollander
2014	Ray Donovan	2	"Yo Soy Capitán"	1	
2013	Ray Donovan	1	"Same Exactly"	12	
2013	Ray Donovan	1	"Bridget"	8	
2013	Ray Donovan	1	"A Mouth is a Mouth"	2	
2013	Ray Donovan	1	"The Bag or the Bat"	1	
2011	Southland	3	"Let it Snow"	1	Co-written with John Wells
2010	Southland	2	"U-Boat"	3	
2010	Southland	2	"Phase Three"	1	Co-written with John Wells
2009	Southland	1	"Derailed"	7	
2009	Southland	1	"Westside"	6	Story by Ann Biderman, Teleplay by Angela Amato Velez & Dee Johnson
2009	Southland	1	"Sally in the Alley"	4	Co-written with Angela Amato Velez
2009	Southland	1	"See the Woman"	3	
2009	Southland	1	"Mozambique"	2	
2009	Southland	1	"Unknown Trouble"	1	
1994	NYPD Blue	1	"Good Time Charlie"	20	
1994	NYPD Blue	1	"Zeppo Marks Brothers"	18	
1994	NYPD Blue	1	"Steroid Roy"	15	
