= O Captain, My Captain (Shameless) =

- Shameless episode
- Episode no.: Season 10; Episode 9
- Directed by: Anthony Hardwick
- Written by: Philip Buiser
- Cinematography by: Anthony Vietro
- Editing by: Russell Denove
- Original release date: January 5, 2020
- Running time: 52 minutes

Guest appearances
- Mary Kay Place as Aunt Oopie (special guest star); Elizabeth Rodriguez as Faye Donahue (special guest star); Constance Zimmer as Claudia Nicolo (special guest star); Scott Michael Campbell as Brad; Federico Dordei as Tully Peterson; Nadine Ellis as Dr. Brenda Williams; Adam Farabee as Byron Koch; Alison Jaye as Julia Nicolo; William O'Leary as Sgt. Rucker; Jaclyn Kelly Shaw as Ali Proctor; Jim Hoffmaster as Kermit; Michael Patrick McGill as Tommy

Episode chronology
← Previous "Debbie Might Be a Prostitute"	Next → "Now Leaving Illinois"
- Shameless season 10

"O Captain, My Captain" is the ninth episode of the tenth season of the American television comedy drama Shameless, an adaptation of the British series of the same name. It is the 119th overall episode of the series and was written by supervising producer Philip Buiser, and directed by Anthony Hardwick. It originally aired on Showtime on January 5, 2020.

The series is set on the South Side of Chicago, Illinois, and depicts the poor, dysfunctional family of Frank Gallagher, a neglectful single father of six: Fiona, Phillip, Ian, Debbie, Carl, and Liam. He spends his days drunk, high, or in search of money, while his children need to learn to take care of themselves. The family's status is shaken after Fiona chooses to leave. In the episode, Frank uncovers a tragic revelation to his connection to Faye. Meanwhile, Ian tries to reconnect with Mickey following their break up, while Debbie struggles in taking care of Claudia's daughter.

According to Nielsen Media Research, the episode was seen by an estimated 0.77 million household viewers and gained a 0.23 ratings share among adults aged 18–49. The episode received mixed reviews from critics, with many criticizing the incomplete nature of the subplots.

== Plot ==
As Ian recovers from his leg wound, he sees that Mickey has already found a new boyfriend; a man named Byron. Mickey then decides to move out of the Gallagher household, despite Ian's attempts to fix their relationship.

Faye continues keeping Frank as a hostage in the house. She offers him drugs and alcohol if he correctly guesses the answers to questions from his past with Kyle, her convicted boyfriend. When Frank finally declares that he is responsible for Kyle's conviction, Faye makes him consume large quantities of opioid and drops him off at a car. Lip and Tami find that they are indebted to the hospital, but Lip prefers to just not pay the bills. Later, Lip tries to return a woman's money at an ATM, but a thief steals the money. To pay the bills, Lip gets a big job at the shop. Aunt Oopie goes missing, leaving Fred without a babysitter.

After a sexual encounter, Claudia asks Debbie if she can pick up her daughter Julia from school. Julia has no respect for Debbie, even calling her a prostitute, and accuses her of polluting the planet. While Debbie grows frustrated with her, she realizes that Claudia often makes bad comments about her body. She takes her to eat burgers, but is shocked when Julia kisses her. Veronica establishes a medical aid service for people at the bar, hoping she can make a difference. She and Kevin are astounded when a woman brings her daughter to get an abortion, so she supplies her with an abortion pill. To get more pills, they write prescriptions for her elderly patients, but are shocked when they are visited that night by more women asking for the abortion pill.

Carl trains his new cadets at home, teaching them how to attack and react under stress. While Carl is proud of his cadets' improvements, his boss reveals that many of the trainees ended up at the hospital, and asks him to take it easier on them. Ian and Liam (Christian Isaiah) steal Oopie's credit card to buy a ring, hoping to win Mickey back by finally marrying him. He shows up at his new apartment, but he just gives him the ring, claiming this will be a promise for a better future. Ian leaves, and the proposal is unresolved.

== Production ==
=== Development ===
The episode was written by supervising producer Philip Buiser, and directed by Anthony Hardwick. It was Buiser's fourth writing credit, and Hardwick's first directing credit.

== Reception ==
=== Viewers ===
In its original American broadcast, "O Captain, My Captain" was seen by an estimated 0.77 million household viewers with a 0.23 in the 18–49 demographics. This means that 0.23 percent of all households with televisions watched the episode. This was a 11% decrease in viewership from the previous episode, which was seen by an estimated 0.86 million household viewers with a 0.26 in the 18–49 demographics.

=== Critical reviews ===
"O Captain, My Captain" received mixed reviews from critics. Myles McNutt of The A.V. Club gave the episode a "B–" grade and wrote, "While the show's decline can be attributed to a variety of factors, the truth is that the choice to divide the show's focus is what pulled us away from the parts of the show that worked best, and their reappearance in a section of this episode is unlikely to be a sign of a larger trend."

Daniel Kurland of Den of Geek gave the episode a 2.5 star rating out of 5 and wrote "“O Captain, My Captain” isn't necessarily a bad episode of Shameless, but it just feels like a fraction of an episode. All of the decisions made are appropriate, but the progress is so incidental (other than Debbie's storyline) that there's nothing to really get excited over here. Shameless isn't a series that all about its plot progression, but this episode in particular feels like it spins its wheels with old ideas when it should be trying to look forward." Meaghan Darwish of TV Insider wrote "Trouble seems to follow the Gallaghers wherever they go and this week's episode is no exception."
