= Debbie Might Be a Prostitute =

- Shameless episode
- Episode no.: Season 10; Episode 8
- Directed by: Rose Troche
- Written by: Molly Smith Metzler
- Cinematography by: Anthony Vietro
- Editing by: Mark Strand
- Original release date: December 29, 2019
- Running time: 58 minutes

Guest appearances
- Rachel Dratch as Paula Bitterman (special guest star); Mary Kay Place as Aunt Oopie (special guest star); Elizabeth Rodriguez as Faye Donahue (special guest star); Constance Zimmer as Claudia Nicolo (special guest star); Scott Michael Campbell as Brad; Dennis Cockrum as Terry Milkovich; Sarah Colonna as Lori; Elise Eberle as Sandy Milkovich; Dylan Gelula as Megan; Dan Martin as Officer Jones; Nicki Micheaux as Michelle 'Shelly' Demeter; Collette Wolfe as Tessa; Jim Hoffmaster as Kermit; Michael Patrick McGill as Tommy; Eddie Alfano as K.J.; John Duerler as Officer Cody; Kirk Hawkins as Reporter; Doug McKeon as Judge; Salli Saffioti as Libby

Episode chronology
← Previous "Citizen Carl"	Next → "O Captain, My Captain"
- Shameless season 10

"Debbie Might Be a Prostitute" is the eighth episode of the tenth season of the American television comedy drama Shameless, an adaptation of the British series of the same name. It is the 118th overall episode of the series and was written by co-executive producer Molly Smith Metzler, and directed by Rose Troche. It originally aired on Showtime on December 29, 2019.

The series is set on the South Side of Chicago, Illinois, and depicts the poor, dysfunctional family of Frank Gallagher, a neglectful single father of six: Fiona, Phillip, Ian, Debbie, Carl, and Liam. He spends his days drunk, high, or in search of money, while his children need to learn to take care of themselves. The family's status is shaken after Fiona chooses to leave. In the episode, Lip and Tami argue over Fred's care. Meanwhile, Paula is found murdered, and Ian and Mickey suspect each other of conspiring in her murder.

According to Nielsen Media Research, the episode was seen by an estimated 0.86 million household viewers and gained a 0.26 ratings share among adults aged 18–49. The episode received generally positive reviews from critics, who praised the emotional tone of the episode, with many considering it as an improvement over previous episodes.

== Plot ==
An unknown assailant surprises Paula at her apartment. Suddenly, the assailant pushes her out the window, and Paula falls to her death. The police immediately has her parolees as suspects, including Ian and Mickey. As each one said they would like to kill her, they suspect each other of being involved in the death.

Lip and Tami enroll Fred at a daycare. As they file emergency contacts, they start debating on who should be the legal guardian of Fred in case they both die. Tami wants her sister, but Lip does not trust her with the baby. When the daycare cannot accept Fred due to a rash, Tami's aunt Oopie babysits him, although Lip dislikes her personality. Kevin and Veronica are approached by a sales representative, who offers them under-eye products for money. They accept, but they realize they fell for a Ponzi scheme. When the representative refuses to give their money back, they re-sell the product to treat hemorrhoid, earning their money back.

Frank continues his relationship with Faye, who reveals she has a house, but refuses to enter as she believes it might be haunted. Frank convinces her in taking them there, and they prepare to have sex in her bedroom. However, she handcuffs him to bed and shows him a video. In it, a court hearing prosecutes her boyfriend for selling drugs to a young Frank in 1995. Frank is allowed to walk free, while the dealer is sentenced to 45 years. Faye wants revenge against him, and leaves to find tools. Liam oversees his talent, Todd, as he plays at a basketball game. He tricks him into kneeling during a game, raising his popularity in social media. He then has him advocate for many organizations at his next game, earning him a standing ovation.

Debbie returns to the hotel to talk with Claudia to return her money, realizing she mistook her for a prostitute. To her surprise, Claudia is also attracted to Debbie, and they agree to start dating. Carl decides to apply to become a police officer; while the police is impressed by him, they instead task him to lead a youth program. Ian convinces Mickey that they should marry, as they will not testify against each other in a court. Before they are officiated, they discover that Ian's EMT boss Shelly was arrested after the police concluded she killed Paula. When they get the papers, Mickey signs, but Ian hesitates, causing Mickey to angrily leave. As Ian tries to defend his hesitancy, Mickey pushes him down the stairs.

== Production ==
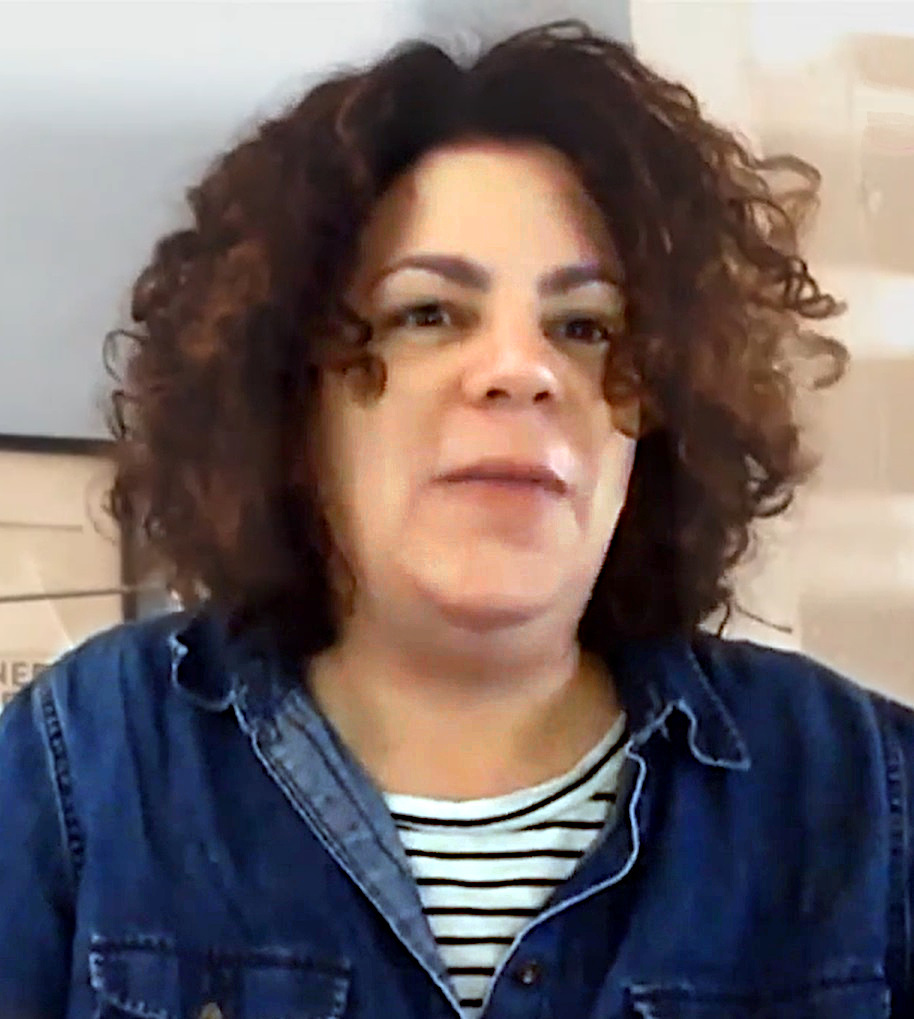
The episode was directed by Rose Troche.

The episode was written by co-executive producer Molly Smith Metzler, and directed by Rose Troche. It was Smith Metzler's sixth writing credit, and Troche's first directing credit.

== Reception ==
=== Viewers ===
In its original American broadcast, "Debbie Might Be a Prostitute" was seen by an estimated 0.86 million household viewers with a 0.26 in the 18–49 demographics. This means that 0.26 percent of all households with televisions watched the episode. This was a slight increase in viewership from the previous episode, which was seen by an estimated 0.84 million household viewers with a 0.23 in the 18–49 demographics.

=== Critical reviews ===
"Debbie Might Be a Prostitute" received generally positive reviews from critics. Myles McNutt of The A.V. Club gave the episode a "B–" grade and wrote, "if I'm being entirely honest, if I wasn't writing about the show I would probably be skipping Alibi scenes, which feel like a lost cause to me. But the truth is that the show is still a whole, and they're still set on filling over 55 minutes every week, and even with the core of the show in better shape there's too much wasted space for the show to approach the potential of the stories it's telling."

Daniel Kurland of Den of Geek gave the episode a 4 star rating out of 5 and wrote "“Debbie Might Be A Prostitute” has a lot to work through and faces an uphill task, but the episode has a very well written script that contains some fantastic dialogue, makes a lot of tiny decisions that are smart, and features some very funny gags and payoffs. Even if all of the larger beats don't connect, Molly Smith Metzler's script really captures these characters well and turns this into one of the more enjoyable episodes of the season. As contrived as many of these storylines are, Metzler gets the most out of them and finds ways to make them work within their restrictions." Meaghan Darwish of TV Insider wrote "Shameless isn't slowing down as it heads into the new year as the Gallaghers continue to deal with familiar issues as well as some new ones. In the latest episode, “Debbie Might Be a Prostitute,” things begin with a bang, so to speak, as the series takes a dark turn."
