= Citizen Carl =

- Shameless episode
- Episode no.: Season 10; Episode 7
- Directed by: Erin Feeley
- Written by: Nancy M. Pimental
- Cinematography by: Anthony Hardwick
- Editing by: Michael S. Stern
- Original release date: December 22, 2019
- Running time: 53 minutes

Guest appearances
- Rachel Dratch as Paula Bitterman (special guest star); Elizabeth Rodriguez as Faye Donahue (special guest star); Constance Zimmer as Claudia Nicolo (special guest star); Maya Bednarek as Stella; Sarah Colonna as Lori; Elise Eberle as Sandy Milkovich; Jess Gabor as Kelly Keefe; Dylan Gelula as Megan; Danube Hermosillo as Pepa; Nicki Micheaux as Michelle 'Shelly' Demeter; Jim Hoffmaster as Kermit; Michael Patrick McGill as Tommy; Eddie Alfano as K.J.; John Lee Ames as Caleefa; Tiffany Renee Johnson as Gloria Johnson; Katherine A. Mitchell as Ester

Episode chronology
← Previous "Adios Gringos"	Next → "Debbie Might Be a Prostitute"
- Shameless season 10

"Citizen Carl" is the seventh episode of the tenth season of the American television comedy drama Shameless, an adaptation of the British series of the same name. It is the 117th overall episode of the series and was written by executive producer Nancy M. Pimental, and directed by Erin Feeley. It originally aired on Showtime on December 22, 2019.

The series is set on the South Side of Chicago, Illinois, and depicts the poor, dysfunctional family of Frank Gallagher, a neglectful single father of six: Fiona, Phillip, Ian, Debbie, Carl, and Liam. He spends his days drunk, high, or in search of money, while his children need to learn to take care of themselves. The family's status is shaken after Fiona chooses to leave. In the episode, Carl decides to make the neighborhood safer, while Lip and Tami bond while making their RV livable. Meanwhile, Frank bonds with a woman, while Ian and Mickey struggle with their parole officers.

According to Nielsen Media Research, the episode was seen by an estimated 0.84 million household viewers and gained a 0.23 ratings share among adults aged 18–49. The episode received mixed reviews from critics, who criticized the writing and storylines.

== Plot ==
After witnessing an elderly woman being shot the previous night, Carl decides that he needs to make the neighborhood safer. He contacts a news crew to report so that the city workers can prioritize streetlights, but the crew ignores the shooting due to the poor conditions of the area.

At the Alibi, Kevin and Veronica are shocked when a bar patron, Bill, died during the night. Frank seizes the opportunity to steal his wallet and car keys, using the opportunity to rob his apartment. Bill's death shakes Kevin, who feels guilty that serving him alcohol caused his cirrhosis. As he tries to reduce the level of alcohol, Veronica is surprised to learn that Bill's visits contributed to 28% of the bar's profits, putting them in trouble with the supply and demand. Ian has his paycheck taken from Paula after not following her scam. Mickey starts working as a security guard at a mall store, while also avoiding cartel members seeking retribution.

Lip and Tami struggle in adapting to the RV, particularly as Lip did not check the sewage system. They also try to have sex for the first time in weeks, but continue running into problems. Eventually, they find help through Stella and Tami's father. Pepa returns the fake Franny to Debbie, deciding that she wants nothing to do with her. That night, Debbie and Megan go to a bar to celebrate their success. As Megan tries to find a new man, Debbie becomes interested in a woman, Claudia. Debbie and Claudia later have sex in her hotel room, and Debbie is surprised when Claudia pays her for the encounter.

Frank runs into a seemingly rich woman, Faye Donahue, who invites him to drink with her. She then takes him to her car, where she is revealed to be living. Carl and Kelly stage a fake robbery in the neighborhood, finally getting the city workers to set up streelights. Ian and Mickey are shocked when Paula reveals she is now Mickey's parole officer, and uses him to help Ian in her scams. Mickey is forced to retrieve money from a man who owes to Paula, and he throws him out a window. After Paula leaves satisfied, Mickey concludes that they must kill her.

== Production ==
=== Development ===
The episode was written by executive producer Nancy M. Pimental, and directed by Erin Feeley. It was Pimental's 24th writing credit, and Feeley's second directing credit.

== Reception ==
=== Viewers ===
In its original American broadcast, "Citizen Carl" was seen by an estimated 0.84 million household viewers with a 0.23 in the 18–49 demographics. This means that 0.23 percent of all households with televisions watched the episode. This was a slight decrease in viewership from the previous episode, which was seen by an estimated 0.89 million household viewers with a 0.21 in the 18–49 demographics.

=== Critical reviews ===
"Citizen Carl" received mixed reviews from critics. Myles McNutt of The A.V. Club gave the episode a "C–" grade and wrote, "While much of this season has forced reflection on whether the show is still interesting enough to merit close analysis, it has done so in ways that are at least interesting in their failure. “Citizen Carl,” though, is the first episode of the season that's exasperating to the point of wondering if the show Shameless was even exists anymore."

Daniel Kurland of Den of Geek gave the episode a 3 star rating out of 5 and wrote "If Shameless can stay focused and ride these ideas out until the end of the season then there could be a half-decent finish to all of this. Then again, at the rate that the show is currently moving at, the next episode will probably have Frank selling dinosaur eggs while Debbie uses her latest cash influx to turn herself into a sex robot." Meaghan Darwish of TV Insider wrote "The year may be winding down, but the Gallaghers slow down for no one and the latest episode of Shameless proves that. In December 22's “Citizen Carl,” the siblings experience different woes in Chicago's South Side as father Frank does what he does best — drink and scam."
