= Sparky (Shameless) =

- Shameless episode
- Episode no.: Season 10; Episode 5
- Directed by: William H. Macy
- Written by: Philip Buiser
- Cinematography by: Anthony Hardwick
- Editing by: Russell Denove
- Original release date: December 8, 2019
- Running time: 55 minutes

Guest appearances
- Rachel Dratch as Paula Bitterman (special guest star); Fayelyn Bilodeau as Patti; Andy Buckley as Randy; Scott Michael Campbell as Brad; Nadine Ellis as Dr. Brenda Williams; Jess Gabor as Kelly Keefe; Dylan Gelula as Megan; Danube Hermosillo as Pepa; Nicki Micheaux as Michelle 'Shelly' Demeter; Ramiz Monsef as Mas; Chelsea Rendon as Anne Gonzalez; Idara Victor as Sarah; Peter Banifaz as Farhad; Jim Hoffmaster as Kermit; Michael Patrick McGill as Tommy

Episode chronology
← Previous "A Little Gallagher Goes a Long Way"	Next → "Adios Gringos"
- Shameless season 10

"Sparky" is the fifth episode of the tenth season of the American television comedy drama Shameless, an adaptation of the British series of the same name. It is the 115th overall episode of the series and was written by supervising producer Philip Buiser, and directed by main cast member William H. Macy. It originally aired on Showtime on December 8, 2019.

The series is set on the South Side of Chicago, Illinois, and depicts the poor, dysfunctional family of Frank Gallagher, a neglectful single father of six: Fiona, Phillip, Ian, Debbie, Carl, and Liam. He spends his days drunk, high, or in search of money, while his children need to learn to take care of themselves. The family's status is shaken after Fiona chooses to leave. In the episode, Ian is released from prison, while Frank is confronted by Randy. Meanwhile, Tami struggles in raising her child, while Debbie hires a lawyer in order to gain Derek's military benefits.

According to Nielsen Media Research, the episode was seen by an estimated 0.83 million household viewers and gained a 0.26 ratings share among adults aged 18–49. The episode received mixed reviews from critics, who criticized the characterization of the story arcs in the episode.

== Plot ==
Lip picks up Ian from prison, as the latter begins his parole. Later, Ian meets his parole officer, Paula Bitterman, who is very strict with her job. Paula has no respect for Ian, even calling him "Sparky" instead.

Tami starts taking care of Fred, but is unprepared by the amount of demands needed. Lip decides to send Sarah to help her, but Tami is infuriated as she feels Lip does not trust her. Nevertheless, Tami asks her for advice, then explains her concerns to Lip that Fred might not love her. Carl is struggling between choosing Kelly (Jess Gabor) and Anne, as both are clearly fighting for him. Carl and Kelly eventually talk over their previous affairs, and they decide to continue as a couple. Frank is astonished when Randy returns, after Ingrid abandoned him with her two children. Frank refuses, and finally reveals that Carl is the father of the kids, shocking them.

Debbie asks her friends to deliver a legal paperwork notice to Pepa, informing that she is finally seeking right to Derek's death benefit. After failed attempts, Debbie finally chases her through town until she tackles her at the subway station, putting the notice in her mouth. Liam becomes a manager for a school basketball player, and later invites the team to his house. At the Alibi, Kevin is visited by a former childhood friend, who reveals that he and other classmates are suing their coach for sexually abusing them, with each getting $10,000 in settlement. Kevin does not believe he was molested, but then asks why he was never abused. He visits the coach in prison, who denies the claim, although it is revealed he is masturbating to Kevin through their phone call.

Frank and Randy eventually reach an agreement, wherein they will both raise a child separately. Frank then decides to sell the baby for adoption, splitting half the revenue with Carl. Debbie is visited by Pepa, who agrees to give her part of the death benefit, but demands full custody of Franny. Ian starts a new job as an EMT paramedic, but discovers that the job is simply administering drugs to bystanders, but is warned not to tell Paula. That night, the family throws a welcome party for Ian. Despite his bad day, Ian happily carries his nephew for the first time.

== Production ==
=== Development ===
The episode was written by supervising producer Philip Buiser, and directed by main cast member William H. Macy. It was Buiser's fourth writing credit, and Macy's third directing credit.

== Reception ==
=== Viewers ===
In its original American broadcast, "Sparky" was seen by an estimated 0.83 million household viewers with a 0.26 in the 18–49 demographics. This means that 0.26 percent of all households with televisions watched the episode. This was a slight decrease in viewership from the previous episode, which was seen by an estimated 0.87 million household viewers with a 0.27 in the 18–49 demographics.

=== Critical reviews ===
"Sparky" received mixed reviews from critics. Myles McNutt of The A.V. Club gave the episode a "C" grade and wrote, "I don't think everyone on Shameless needs to have shame. There is room on this show for characters to act in ways we disagree with, and for conflict to arise from that. But the show sometimes fails to show the work necessary for this [...] There's a similar energy in the story that gives the episode its name, as Rachel Dratch's corrupt parole officer is pure caricature, all to justify the insane situation Ian finds himself in. These exaggerations might solve short-term problems, but they fuel long-term distrust in the storytelling, and do little to create momentum for the rest of the season."

Daniel Kurland of Den of Geek gave the episode a 3 star rating out of 5 and wrote "“Sparky” has Shameless' tenth season shifting into second gear and getting ready for what their endgame will look like. This is an episode that still has characters making all sorts of mistakes and venturing into poor decisions, but there's a level of stability that's helping hold all of this together at the moment."

Kimberly Ricci of Uproxx wrote "Lip's already enraged Tami by having a lady friend stop by to “help,” and that mistake is on him. Everyone seems to realize this but Lip, and there's no way that the situation will remedy itself without exploding. Before that happens, we could use a little sunshine right now in Shameless world. Maybe we'll see a return of the old vibe before Christmas arrives, for this show's continued longevity might depend on it." Meaghan Darwish of TV Insider wrote "The trials and tribulations of the Gallagher family continue in the latest episode of Shameless. Titled “Sparky,” the installment saw some big arrivals and twists shaking up the South Side family's schedule."
