= Adios Gringos =

- Shameless episode
- Episode no.: Season 10; Episode 6
- Directed by: Loren Yaconelli
- Written by: Sherman Payne
- Cinematography by: Anthony Hardwick
- Editing by: Mark Strand
- Original release date: December 15, 2019
- Running time: 57 minutes

Guest appearances
- Rachel Dratch as Paula Bitterman (special guest star); Maya Bednarek as Stella; Vanessa Bell Calloway as Carol Fisher; Chip Chinery as Larry Seaver; Nadine Ellis as Dr. Brenda Williams; Danube Hermosillo as Pepa; Chelsea Rendon as Anne Gonzalez; Idara Victor as Sarah; Tangie Ambrose as Foster Care Worker; Bruce Beatty as Jim; Marisa Echeverria as Lynn; Jim Hoffmaster as Kermit; Michael Patrick McGill as Tommy; Kathryn Taylor Smith as Dr. Lawrence

Episode chronology
← Previous "Sparky"	Next → "Citizen Carl"
- Shameless season 10

"Adios Gringos" is the sixth episode of the tenth season of the American television comedy drama Shameless, an adaptation of the British series of the same name. It is the 116th overall episode of the series and was written by Sherman Payne, and directed by Loren Yaconelli. It originally aired on Showtime on December 15, 2019.

The series is set on the South Side of Chicago, Illinois, and depicts the poor, dysfunctional family of Frank Gallagher, a neglectful single father of six: Fiona, Phillip, Ian, Debbie, Carl, and Liam. He spends his days drunk, high, or in search of money, while his children need to learn to take care of themselves. The family's status is shaken after Fiona chooses to leave. In the episode, Frank and Liam work together to sell one of Carl's babies to potential parents. Meanwhile, Mickey is released from prison, while Debbie fights for Franny's custody.

According to Nielsen Media Research, the episode was seen by an estimated 0.89 million household viewers and gained a 0.21 ratings share among adults aged 18–49. The episode received mixed reviews from critics, although some praised the slight character development in the episode.

== Plot ==
Frank (William H. Macy) meets with a couple interested in buying one of Carl's children for adoption. He and Liam (Christian Isaiah) get the couple to pay for a hotel room so they can set up the adoption papers. As Frank also contacts an elderly man as another customer, he and Liam enjoy the benefits of room service.

Debbie (Emma Kenney) secures a deal with Pepa over the custody rights for Franny, managing to make it partial instead. Nevertheless, Debbie does not want Franny to stay with Pepa, so she instead gets a child from a foster house to pretend to be Franny. However, she discovers that the child has a problematic older sister, so she leaves her with Pepa, wreaking havoc at the house. Lip (Jeremy Allen White) takes Tami (Kate Miner) to meet other parents at the AA meeting, but she is upset when he introduces her as Fred's mother. This leads to an argument where they question their role in each other's life.

Mickey (Noel Fisher) fails to escape from prison, but is released anyway after having helped in taking the cartel down. He is pursued by a car, although the driver is his parole officer, Larry Seaver (Chip Chinery). He reunites with Ian (Cameron Monaghan) at his house, but Ian is confronted by Paula (Rachel Dratch) for having helped a woman instead of running the EMT scam. As Ian walks home, he sees a car accident, and disappointingly walks away without helping. Carl (Ethan Cutkosky) and Anne (Chelsea Rendon) face a rival Mexican family, who steals her family's tamales business. Unable to compete against them, Carl decides that the family can earn more money by moving to an upper-class neighborhood, and use vegan ingredients.

Kevin (Steve Howey) tries to be part of the lawsuit against his childhood coach by pretending he was sexually abused as well. He tries to memorize a real case, but the lawyer eventually discovers the truth. At the hotel, Frank begins bonding with his grandson and has second thoughts about giving him up. The elderly man offers $100,000, and Liam accepts the deal on his behalf. However, they realize that the couple has fled with the baby. Lip apologizes to Tami for his behavior and surprises her by buying an RV, intending for them to live in it. Anne's family earns enough money to buy an apartment, and they leave the Gallagher household. Before leaving, Anne and Carl share a kiss.

== Production ==
The episode was written by Sherman Payne, and directed by Loren Yaconelli. It was Payne's first writing credit, and Yaconelli's second directing credit.

== Reception ==
=== Viewers ===
In its original American broadcast, "Adios Gringos" was seen by an estimated 0.89 million household viewers with a 0.21 in the 18–49 demographics. This means that 0.21 percent of all households with televisions watched the episode. This was a 7 percent increase in viewership from the previous episode, which was seen by an estimated 0.83 million household viewers with a 0.26 in the 18–49 demographics.

=== Critical reviews ===
"Adios Gringos" received mixed reviews from critics. Myles McNutt of The A.V. Club gave the episode a "C+" grade and wrote, "I'll accept the baby steps over nothing, perhaps, but I'm going to need to see a lot more follow through on these ideas for me to ever get excited instead of scared when this show about class extends its lens to race."

Daniel Kurland of Den of Geek gave the episode a 3 star rating out of 5 and wrote "“Adios Gringos” is a heightened episode of Shameless, but it's also an installment that centers around the Gallagher family coming together. There are a lot of poor decisions that drive this story forward, but by the end of the episode everyone in this family is more connected than before. “Adios Gringos” chooses to jump through some bizarre hoops and while the end may not justify the means, at least everyone is smiling when the credits roll. There may be no room for sentiment in business, but that doesn't mean that you can't be happy with the results." Meaghan Darwish of TV Insider wrote "Another Sunday means more craziness from Shameless' Gallagher clan living in the South Side of Chicago, and such was the latest case with the December 15 episode, “Adio Gringos.”"
