= Now Leaving Illinois =

- Shameless episode
- Episode no.: Season 10; Episode 10
- Directed by: Kevin Bray
- Written by: Sherman Payne
- Cinematography by: Anthony Hardwick
- Editing by: Michael S. Stern
- Original release date: January 12, 2020
- Running time: 58 minutes

Guest appearances
- Mary Kay Place as Aunt Oopie (special guest star); Elizabeth Rodriguez as Faye Donahue (special guest star); Constance Zimmer as Claudia Nicolo (special guest star); Brianna Barnes as Delphine; Thomas Beaudoin as Lorne; Elisa Bocanegra as Mrs. Woodson; Scott Michael Campbell as Brad; Caroline Stefanie Clay as Cheryl Ward; Adam Farabee as Byron Koch; David Folsom as Vin; Dylan Gelula as Megan; Alison Jaye as Julia Nicolo; Chester Lockhart as Cole; Krys Marshall as Mora; William O'Leary as Sgt. Rucker; Jim Hoffmaster as Kermit; Michael Patrick McGill as Tommy

Episode chronology
← Previous "O Captain, My Captain"	Next → "Location, Location, Location"
- Shameless season 10

"Now Leaving Illinois" is the tenth episode of the tenth season of the American television comedy drama Shameless, an adaptation of the British series of the same name. It is the 120th overall episode of the series and was written by Sherman Payne, and directed by Kevin Bray. It originally aired on Showtime on January 12, 2020.

The series is set on the South Side of Chicago, Illinois, and depicts the poor, dysfunctional family of Frank Gallagher, a neglectful single father of six: Fiona, Phillip, Ian, Debbie, Carl, and Liam. He spends his days drunk, high, or in search of money, while his children need to learn to take care of themselves. The family's status is shaken after Fiona chooses to leave. In the episode, Ian moves forward with a new potential date. Meanwhile, Frank heads to trial when Faye sabotages him, while Lip takes a huge decision for the sake of Tami and Fred.

According to Nielsen Media Research, the episode was seen by an estimated 0.89 million household viewers and gained a 0.23 ratings share among adults aged 18–49. The episode received generally positive reviews from critics, who praised the tone and ending.

== Plot ==
Ian visits Mickey and Byron, with the latter fixing his Vespa. Unaware to them, Ian urinated in the gas tank, ruining Byron's Vespa. They invite Ian to accompany him to a club, which he accepts. Not wanting to go alone, he creates a Grindr account to find a date.

The police find Frank in a car with opioid pills and is subsequently arrested while Faye looks from afar. Frank declares his innocence, until he is forced to strip and two pills are revealed to have been hidden in his anus. He is brought before the judge to get his sentence, but he instead delivers a speech defending himself. The judge decides to skip a prison sentence, and just sentences him to a rehab program, disappointing Faye. Tami takes Lip to her family gathering. Before the meeting, Brad advises Lip to comply with everything Tami says. Tami's father reveals that her grandmother is moving to a nursing home and that her house in Milwaukee is vacant. The family hopes that Lip and Tami move with Fred to the house, but Lip hesitates on the offer.

Debbie is hired by Claudia to become her house assistant, and Julia (Alison Jaye) seizes this to seduce her. Debbie hesitates over continuing interacting with them, but Megan tells her to continue for the money. She reaches her breaking point when Julia "proposes" to her by asking her to take her to the school homecoming dance. Carl is demoted to sanitation, but is fascinated by the lessons that the crew provides, such as keeping valuable garbage for himself. However, Carl catches them brutally beating a real estate agent, and reports it to his boss. Kevin and Veronica offer themselves for an auction bid, in order to get their children enrolled in a prestigious school. A couple offers $5,000 for a meeting at their house, and they believe they want to be swingers. However, the couple only visits so that their son can see the poor state of their house and motivate him to focus on his studies.

At the club, Ian and Mickey are clearly feeling jealousy at each other's dates. Fed up, Ian admits his feelings for Mickey and proposes to him, and Mickey finally accepts. Julia shows up at Debbie's house and forces her to accompany her to homecoming, threatening to reveal that she performed oral sex on her. At rehab, Frank enjoys the benefits of his stay. Lip and Tami check her grandmother's house and decide that they want to live there. Lip announces to the family that he has chosen to leave for Milwaukee with Tami, promising to occasionally visit.

== Production ==
=== Development ===
The episode was written by Sherman Payne, and directed by Kevin Bray. It was Payne's second writing credit, and Bray's first directing credit.

== Reception ==
=== Viewers ===
In its original American broadcast, "Now Leaving Illinois" was seen by an estimated 0.89 million household viewers with a 0.23 in the 18–49 demographics. This means that 0.23 percent of all households with televisions watched the episode. This was a 15 percent increase in viewership from the previous episode, which was seen by an estimated 0.77 million household viewers with a 0.23 in the 18–49 demographics.

=== Critical reviews ===
"Now Leaving Illinois" received generally positive reviews from critics. Myles McNutt of The A.V. Club gave the episode a "B–" grade and wrote, "This ending seems to suggest this will be changing heading into the finale, which is good, but as with Lip's situation I'm not convinced the show is actually recognizing its shortcomings and prepared to course correct enough to get the season back on track."

Daniel Kurland of Den of Geek gave the episode a 3.5 star rating out of 5 and wrote "This season of Shameless has featured some of the broadest stories that the show has ever explored, but also some of its most mature emotional material. With two episodes left in this transitory season, the Gallaghers are forced to figure out what's really important to them. There's been a lot of denial and deflection this year, but Lip's leap forward is exactly the kind of event that's necessary to help bring focus to the conclusion of these stories."

Kimberly Ricci of Uproxx wrote "This won't end well for any member of the trio, but Debbie's also about to be more distracted by Lip's departure. And that's the same for every remaining Gallagher now, which finally puts a complicated spin on the season with more emotion to come, no doubt." Meaghan Darwish of TV Insider wrote "Season 10 of Shameless is nearing its end with just two more episodes set to air following this Sunday's installment, and many of the Gallaghers made big decisions or were faced with big problems in the episode titled “Now Leaving Illinois.”"
