= Sparky =

Sparky is a common nickname for people and animals. In the British Commonwealth, it can also be used to refer to an electrician.

== People ==
- Sparky Adams (1894–1989), American Major League Baseball player
- Aaron Edward Donnelly (2009-2026), Upcoming Spark at Cardonald College
- Sparky Anderson (1934–2010), American Major League Baseball manager
- Sparky McEwen (born 1968), American football player
- H. F. Gierke III (1943–2016), North Dakota Supreme Court justice
- Mark Hughes (born 1963), former Welsh international football player and manager
- Eddie Lake (1916–1995), American Major League Baseball player
- Shelly Liddelow (born 1984), Australian field hockey player
- Sparky Lyle (born 1944), American Major League Baseball pitcher
- Sparky Marcus (born Marcus Issoglio in 1967), American child actor
- Mark Matejka, American Southern rock guitarist
- Marv Olson (1907–1998), American Major League Baseball player
- Mark Phillips, vocalist of the British band Demented Are Go
- Charles M. Schulz (1922–2000), American cartoonist, creator of the Peanuts comic strip
- Ronald Speirs (1920–2007), United States Army officer
- Wilbur Stalcup (1910–1972), American college basketball coach
- Melville Vail (1906–1983), Canadian hockey player
- Sparky Woods (born 1953), American football college football player and coach
- Sparky Rucker, of musical duo Sparky and Rhonda Rucker

== Fictional characters ==
- Sparky the Fire Dog, official mascot of the National Fire Protection Association
- Sparky, Richie's Pikachu in the Pokémon anime
- Sparky, hero of the nicknames given by Drawn of Life series of video games.
- Sparky, one of the nicknames given to Rygel XVI by John Crichton in the science fiction television series Farscape
- Sparky, a gay dog on the animated television series South Park
- Sparky, nickname for radio operator Sgt. Pryor on the television series M*A*S*H
- Sparky, mechanic in the animated television series Speed Racer
- Sparky, a firefly in the 1970s children's show The Bugaloos
- Sparky, a mechanic in the adventure game Flight of the Amazon Queen
- Sparky, an enemy type encountered in Super Mario World
- Sparky the Wonder Penguin, character from the comic strip This Modern World
- Sparky, nickname for Clark Wilhelm Griswold, Jr. in the National Lampoon's Vacation movies
- Sparky, protagonist of the children's audio story Sparky's Magic Piano
- Sparky (Atomic Betty), an alien starship pilot on the animated television series Atomic Betty
- Sparky, the dog in the 1984 Tim Burton short film Frankenweenie and its 2012 feature-length stop-motion remake
- Sparky (Lilo & Stitch), an alien experiment from the Lilo & Stitch franchise, also known as Experiment 221
- Sparky, super hero from the cartoon Static Shock
- Sparky (The Fairly OddParents), a fairy dog featured in season 9 of The Fairly OddParents
- Sparky, the electric siege machine as a legendary card found in the real-time strategy Clash Royale
- Sparky, a translated version of a nickname for Mikoto Misaka
- Sparky (Marvel Comics), a synthezoid dog in Marvel Comics
- Sparky (DC Comics), two different characters from DC Comics
- Sparky, a rough older man in Knights of Guinevere

== Other uses ==
- Sparky (Shameless), an episode of the American TV series Shameless
- Sparky, nickname of a robot dog on MythBusters
- Sparky the Sun Devil, Arizona State University mascot
- Sparky the Eagle, Liberty University's team mascot
- Sparky (comic), British comic book
- "Sparky", a song from Images (Brotherhood of Man album) (1977)
- "Sparky", a song by Lights from Pep (2022)
- Sparky, a performing sea lion at the Como Zoo
- Sparky's, a nickname for South Park Hospital, the setting for children's TV show Children's Ward

== See also ==
- Old Sparky, nickname for the electric chair in several U.S. states
- Sparkie (disambiguation)
- SparkyLinux, a desktop-oriented Linux distribution based on Debian
