= Location, Location, Location (Shameless) =

- Shameless episode
- Episode no.: Season 10; Episode 11
- Directed by: Silver Tree
- Written by: Joe Lawson
- Cinematography by: Anthony Hardwick
- Editing by: Russell Denove
- Original release date: January 19, 2020
- Running time: 56 minutes

Guest appearances
- Elizabeth Rodriguez as Faye Donahue (special guest star); Constance Zimmer as Claudia Nicolo (special guest star); Thomas Beaudoin as Lorne; Lourdes Benedicto as Tasha; Scott Michael Campbell as Brad; Avery Clyde as Madison; Dennis Cockrum as Terry Milkovich; Elise Eberle as Sandy Milkovich; David Folsom as Vin; Jalen Gilbert as Milton; Alison Jaye as Julia Nicolo; William O'Leary as Sgt. Rucker; Mike Starr as Yard Guy; Jim Hoffmaster as Kermit; Michael Patrick McGill as Tommy

Episode chronology
← Previous "Now Leaving Illinois"	Next → "Gallavich!"
- Shameless season 10

"Location, Location, Location" is the eleventh episode of the tenth season of the American television comedy drama Shameless, an adaptation of the British series of the same name. It is the 121st overall episode of the series and was written by executive producer Joe Lawson, and directed by Silver Tree. It originally aired on Showtime on January 19, 2020.

The series is set on the South Side of Chicago, Illinois, and depicts the poor, dysfunctional family of Frank Gallagher, a neglectful single father of six: Fiona, Phillip, Ian, Debbie, Carl, and Liam. He spends his days drunk, high, or in search of money, while his children need to learn to take care of themselves. The family's status is shaken after Fiona chooses to leave. In the episode, Frank stays at Faye's house, while Lip considers staying in South Side. Meanwhile, Debbie's love triangle gets complicated, while Ian and Mickey plan their wedding.

According to Nielsen Media Research, the episode was seen by an estimated 0.81 million household viewers and gained a 0.22 ratings share among adults aged 18–49. The episode received negative reviews from critics, who criticized the poor continuity and time jump.

== Plot ==
Terry confronts Mickey when he discovers he plans to marry Ian. Mickey defends his decision and almost gets into a gunfight with Terry, before Terry simply walks out, disowning his son. Mickey starts working on the preparations for the wedding, surprising Ian.

After completing his 30 days, Frank leaves the resort rehab. He is approached by Faye, who makes peace with her actions and leaves for Puerto Rico for the winter. Frank seizes the opportunity to break into her house in Glencoe to spend the day. He is interrupted when Liam (Christian Isaiah) shows up, who needs him to sign papers at school to keep his place. Frank reluctantly accompanies him, but later calls Liam to come over to the house as he feels lonely. Despite already agreeing to move in with Tami to Milwaukee, Lip has second thoughts over leaving. He takes an interest in a house in the South Side, planning to rent it despite its poor condition. However, Tami has already secured a place to open a new salon in Milwaukee, complicating his plans.

Debbie reluctantly attends homecoming with Julia, but she also must attend a birthday dinner set by Claudia. Debbie alternates between both events, but she is eventually caught. Julia finally reveals she was only interested in Debbie so she could ruin Claudia's life. As Claudia and Julia get into an argument, Debbie simply leaves. Carl has become an informant for his boss, reporting on the activities committed by his sanitation co-workers. To avoid detection, he agrees to commit acts of vandalism. However, he learns that his boss is actually corrupt like his co-workers, although his boss offers to give him an application to become a real police officer. To earn money, Kevin hires a man to do tasks for the Alibi. Despite the exhaustion, the man is grateful for the job.

Mickey grows agitated with the wedding preparations; an old lady refuses to sell them flowers for their homosexuality, and becomes angry when some chairs are missing. To ease his concerns, Ian gets Mickey's cousin Sandy for help, and reconciles with Mickey. Frank is disturbed by a noise at the house, and discovers a yard guy (Mike Starr) also broke into the house. They agree to co-share the house, and proceed to smoke meth together. Lip reveals his intentions to Tami, who is very upset, particularly when Lip exclaims he does not want her family to provide the home. He takes her to the house, revealing he already bid on the property, confident it will work out for them. Tami simply leaves, disappointed.

== Production ==
=== Development ===
The episode was written by executive producer Joe Lawson, and directed by Silver Tree. It was Lawson's fifth writing credit, and Tree's third directing credit.

== Reception ==
=== Viewers ===
In its original American broadcast, "Location, Location, Location" was seen by an estimated 0.81 million household viewers with a 0.22 in the 18–49 demographics. This means that 0.22 percent of all households with televisions watched the episode. This was a 9% decrease in viewership from the previous episode, which was seen by an estimated 0.89 million household viewers with a 0.23 in the 18–49 demographics.

=== Critical reviews ===
"Location, Location, Location" received negative reviews from critics. Myles McNutt of The A.V. Club gave the episode a "D+" grade and wrote, "The episode reaches past the point of a lack of continuity to a fundamental disinterest in logic, delivering a penultimate episode that destroys any momentum from last week's cliffhanger and generates no momentum of its own. It is, quite simply, a bad episode of television."

Daniel Kurland of Den of Geek gave the episode a 2.5 star rating out of 5 and wrote "There's something to be said for how the end of the episode addresses on some level how absurd some of the plotting of the back-end of this season has been. That doesn't absolve Shameless of this sloppiness, but hopefully the show can get its act back together as it prepares for its final season. This kind of nonsense happening in the show's last year is not the way that you go out on top or end with a strong legacy as a cable drama." Meaghan Darwish of TV Insider wrote "despite the looming finale on Sunday, January 26, Shameless isn't winding down but actually speeding up."
