= Shameless season 10 =

Shameless
- Season 10
- Promotional poster
- Showrunner: John Wells
- Starring: William H. Macy; Jeremy Allen White; Ethan Cutkosky; Shanola Hampton; Steve Howey; Emma Kenney; Cameron Monaghan; Noel Fisher; Christian Isaiah; Kate Miner
- No. of episodes: 12

Release
- Original network: Showtime
- Original release: November 10, 2019 – January 26, 2020

Season chronology
- ← Previous; Season 9 Next → Season 11

The tenth season of Shameless, an American comedy-drama television series based on the British series of the same name by Paul Abbott, was announced on January 31, 2019, two days after the premiere of season 9's ninth episode. The season premiered on November 10, 2019.

It is the first season not to star original cast member Emmy Rossum. Cameron Monaghan, who previously announced his departure from the series in season 9, returned as a series regular. Noel Fisher also rejoined the cast as a series regular alongside William H. Macy, Jeremy Allen White, Ethan Cutkosky, Shanola Hampton, Steve Howey, Emma Kenney, and Christian Isaiah. Kate Miner was promoted to series regular after her recurring role in season 9.

Seasons 10 and 11 of Shameless were filmed together as a single production, so the cast for the tenth and eleventh seasons of Shameless was the same.

== Plot ==
Six months have passed since Fiona left, and with the help of the $50,000 she left, Debbie has taken over as the family's new matriarch and is governing the Gallagher household with an iron grip. In order to obtain as many prescription medicines as possible, Frank utilizes his leg injury, and his activities bring him into contact with an old friend. With Tami showing signs of affection, Lip negotiates their connection. Both released early on parole, Mickey and Ian have reunited, but this time are fighting hard to stay together. Carl must decide what to do with his life as he graduates from military school and returns to the South Side. While Kev struggles with identity issues, Liam is dedicated to studying black history and culture under V's guidance.

== Cast and characters ==
=== Main ===
- William H. Macy as Frank Gallagher
- Jeremy Allen White as Philip "Lip" Gallagher
- Ethan Cutkosky as Carl Gallagher
- Shanola Hampton as Veronica Fisher
- Steve Howey as Kevin Ball
- Emma Kenney as Deborah "Debbie" Gallagher
- Cameron Monaghan as Ian Gallagher
- Noel Fisher as Mickey Milkovich
- Christian Isaiah as Liam Gallagher
- Kate Miner as Tami Tamietti

=== Special guest ===
- Luis Guzmán as Mikey O'Shea
- Rachel Dratch as Paula Bitterman
- Elizabeth Rodriguez as Faye Donahue
- Constance Zimmer as Claudia Nicolo
- Alison Jaye as Julia Nicolo
- Mary Kay Place as Aunt Oopie

=== Recurring ===
- Paris Newton as Franny Gallagher
- Scott Michael Campbell as Brad
- Jess Gabor as Kelly Keefe
- Michael Patrick McGill as Tommy
- Jim Hoffmaster as Kermit
- Peter Banifaz as Farhad
- Melissa Paladino as Cami Tamietti
- David Bowe as Bob Tamietti
- Ozie Nzeribe as Todd
- Sarah Colonna as Lori
- Chelsea Rendon as Anne Gonzalez
- Eddie Alfano as K.J.
- Jason McBeth as Stump
- Anthony Alabi as MaVar
- Lynn Chen as Mimi
- Idara Victor as Sarah
- Dylan Gelula as Megan
- Fayelyn Bilodeau as Patti
- Danube Hermosillo as Pepa
- David Saucedo as Uncle Felipe Gonzalez
- Vanessa Lua as Aunt Telma Gonzalez
- Nadine Ellis as Dr. Brenda Williams
- Nicki Micheaux as Michelle 'Shelly' Demeter
- Elise Eberle as Sandy Milkovich
- Dennis Cockrum as Terry Milkovich
- Alison Jaye as Julia Nicolo
- Adam Farabee as Byron Koch
- William O'Leary as Sgt. Rucker
- David Folsom as Vin

=== Guest ===
- Andy Buckley as Randy
- Vanessa Bell Calloway as Carol Fisher
- Juliette Angelo as Geneva

== Episodes ==
No. overall	No. in season	Title	Directed by	Written by	Original release date	U.S. viewers (millions)
111	1	"We Few, We Lucky Few, We Band of Gallaghers!"	John Wells	John Wells	November 10, 2019	0.76
Six months after Fiona's departure, Debbie has become the new head of the household; she establishes limits on spending the money Fiona left, but is later revealed to be buying expensive clothing, which she returns before the return deadline passes. Liam embraces his African-American heritage. Carl graduates from the military academy, but his superior warns him he will never be welcomed in the Army; Kelly cheers him up by having sex with him multiple times. Kevin experiences a feeling of older age and returns to his job at the gay bar in order to buy expensive sneakers. Frank reunites with Mikey and assists him in a robbery. The doctors perform an emergency Caesarean section on Tami when she suddenly goes into labor; she has complications during delivery and is taken to an emergency room when her pulse drops. The Gallaghers reunite at the hospital to meet Lip and Tami's newborn baby.
112	2	"Sleep Well My Prince for Tomorrow You Shall Be King"	Jennifer Arnold	Nancy M. Pimental	November 17, 2019	0.91
While Tami recovers in the hospital, Lip returns home with his child, whom he has named Fred in honor of Professor Youens. Lip is overwhelmed by the demands of a newborn, and breaks down when he slips and nearly drops Fred. Carl returns to work at Captain Bob's and finds out his new manager, Anne, sells vape paraphernalia; he convinces her in forming a partnership. Kevin and Veronica rob a deliveryman's truck when he is found unconscious in the Alibi's bathroom. Ian and Mickey struggle to keep the romance alive in prison. Feeling the pressure from Debbie, Frank sets out to make money to keep his place in the house. Mikey discovers Debbie's storage unit of products and threatens to destroy the receipts, so she cannot return her items. The following day, Debbie gives debit cards to her family and assigns the role of head of the household to Frank.
113	3	"Which America?"	Silver Tree	Molly Smith Metzler	November 24, 2019	0.84
The debit cards that Debbie provided are declined because she used their social security numbers, leading the bank to use the money she put in to pay for the family's unpaid expenses. After Mikey discovers he has a severe kidney disease, Frank and Mikey steal Debbie's clothing from her storage unit to pay for a procedure. Seeing that Veronica has no friends to hang out with, Kevin uses Tinder to get girls to the Alibi. Anne flirts with Carl. Liam, wanting to learn more about his African-American heritage, begins to bond with MaVar, his distant relative living on the South Side. MaVar allows Liam to sleep at his house after discovering the state of the Gallagher home. Ian receives an early parole hearing, upsetting Mickey. Ian prepares to stab a man to suspend his parole, but Mickey stops him, realizing Ian deserves to leave.
114	4	"A Little Gallagher Goes a Long Way"	Iain B. MacDonald	Joe Lawson	December 1, 2019	0.87
Frank and Mikey continue their misadventures despite Mikey's declining health; Mikey thanks Frank for giving him the best time of his life, and then punches a police officer in order to receive treatment in prison. Lip attends an AA meeting for new parents and bonds with Sarah. Liam accompanies MaVar to a family funeral, but MaVar lambasts him for stealing money. Liam abandons MaVar, concluding that their backgrounds are different. Kevin attempts to bargain trade while Veronica bonds with a Tinder date. Debbie learns that Derek has died in the Army and attempts to collect a death benefit. However, Derek's family already collected the benefit and intend to spend it on his other children. Carl attempts to get closer to Anne and discovers that her family are undocumented immigrants. Carl takes some of Anne's family to the Gallagher home for a party, during which Kelly suddenly returns.
115	5	"Sparky"	William H. Macy	Philip Buiser	December 8, 2019	0.83
Now released from prison, Ian becomes entangled in a corrupted parole office. He starts a new job as an EMT paramedic, but discovers that the job is simply administering drugs to bystanders. In an attempt to obtain Derek's death benefit, Debbie attacks Derek's wife Pepa, who agrees to give her part of the benefit but demands full custody of Franny. Tami returns from the hospital and struggles to bond with Fred. Frank receives a visit from Randy, who has been abandoned by Ingrid; Frank reveals that Carl is actually the father of the kids. Carl is conflicted between Kelly and Anne, and ultimately decides to continue with Kelly. Veronica starts to sell illegal pharmaceuticals, while Liam becomes a manager for a school basketball player. Kevin finds out that his former childhood teammates are suing their coach for sexually abusing them, with each getting $10,000 in settlement. However, Kevin does not believe he was molested, and begins to wonder why he was never abused.
116	6	"Adios Gringos"	Loren Yaconelli	Sherman Payne	December 15, 2019	0.89
Frank and Liam work together to sell one of Carl’s babies to potential parents. Liam accepts an offer of $100,000 from an elderly man, while Frank meets with an interested couple who ends up stealing the baby. Debbie secures a partial deal with Pepa over the custody rights for Franny, but instead uses a child from a foster house to pretend to be Franny. Mickey is released from prison, while Ian is confronted by his strict parole officer Paula for not following through with the EMT scam. Kevin tries to be part of the lawsuit against his childhood coach by pretending he was sexually abused as well. Lip takes Tami to meet other parents at the AA meeting, but she is upset when he introduces her as Fred's mother. Lip surprises Tami by buying an RV, intending for them to live in it. Carl helps Anne with her family's tamales business by convincing her family that they can earn more money in an upper class neighborhood. Anne's family eventually earns enough money to buy an apartment, and she and Carl kiss.
117	7	"Citizen Carl"	Erin Feeley	Nancy M. Pimental	December 22, 2019	0.84
After witnessing an elderly woman being shot, Carl tries to make the neighborhood safer, and he and Kelly stage a robbery to convince the city workers to set up streetlights. Lip and Tami bond while trying to make their RV livable. Kevin and Veronica infiltrate an AA meeting in order to gain more customers at the Alibi. Pepa returns the fake Franny to Debbie, deciding that she wants nothing to do with her. Debbie goes to the bar to celebrate her success, and ends up sleeping with Claudia, an older woman who pays her for her services. Frank befriends Faye, a seemingly rich woman living out of her car. Ian has his paycheck taken from Paula for not following through with her scam. Paula reveals that she is now Mickey's parole officer, and uses him to help Ian in her scams. After Paula forces Mickey to throw a man who owes her out of a window, Mickey deduces that they must kill her.
118	8	"Debbie Might Be a Prostitute"	Rose Troche	Molly Smith Metzler	December 29, 2019	0.86
An unknown assailant surprises Paula at her apartment and kills her by pushing her out the window. Kevin and Veronica accept an offer from a sales representative to sell under-eye products, only to discover that they fell for a Ponzi scheme. When the representative refuses to return their money, they resell the product as a treatment for hemorrhoids. Debbie discovers that Claudia is attracted to her, and they begin dating. Lip and Tami debate on who should be the legal guardian of Fred in case they both die. Faye handcuffs Frank to her bed and reveals that she intends to seek revenge against Frank for sending her drug-dealing fiancé Kyle to prison in 1995. Ian and Mickey both suspect each other of being involved in Paula's death, and Ian convinces Mickey to marry so they will not testify against each other in court. Before they are officiated, they discover that Ian's EMT boss was arrested for killing Paula. When they get the papers, Mickey signs, but Ian hesitates, causing Mickey to leave.
119	9	"O Captain, My Captain"	Anthony Hardwick	Philip Buiser	January 5, 2020	0.77
After a sexual encounter, Claudia asks Debbie if she can pick up her daughter Julia from school; Debbie is shocked when Julia kisses her. Veronica opens a medical aid service at the bar, but she and Kevin are astounded when a woman brings her daughter to get an abortion. Carl leads a youth program and trains his new cadets at home, teaching them how to attack and react under stress; he is demoted to sanitization when many of the trainees end up in the hospital. Lip and Tami discover that they are indebted to the hospital. Faye continues keeping Frank as a hostage. When Frank finally declares that he is responsible for Kyle's conviction, Faye makes him consume large quantities of opioids and sends him into a car. Ian tries to reconnect with Mickey, who moves out and has begun dating Byron. Hoping to win back Mickey, Ian buys a ring and shows up outside Mickey's new apartment; he gives him the ring, claiming it will be a promise for a better future.
120	10	"Now Leaving Illinois"	Kevin Bray	Sherman Payne	January 12, 2020	0.89
The police find Frank in a car with opioid pills and arrest him. Frank is brought before the judge to get his prison sentence, but Frank manipulates the judge into sending him to rehab instead, disappointing Faye. Carl catches the sanitization crew brutally beating a real estate agent and reports it to his boss. Kevin and Veronica offer themselves for an auction bid in order to get their children enrolled in a prestigious school. Claudia hires Debbie to become her house assistant, and Julia forces Debbie to accompany her to the prom, threatening to reveal that she performed oral sex on her. Ian creates a Grindr account to find a date when Mickey and Byron invite him to a club. Ian and Mickey are clearly jealous at each other's dates, leading Ian to admit his feelings for Mickey and propose; Mickey accepts the proposal. Tami's family expresses interest in having her and Lip move into her grandmother's vacant Milwaukee home. Lip agrees, and later announces to his siblings that he is leaving for Milkwaukee with Tami.
121	11	"Location, Location, Location"	Silver Tree	Joe Lawson	January 19, 2020	0.81
Mickey grows agitated with wedding preparations, while Terry disowns Mickey after discovering his plans to marry Ian. After completing his thirty days in rehab, Frank is released and is approached by Faye, who is heading to Puerto Rico for the winter. Frank seizes the opportunity by breaking into her Glencoe home. Debbie tries to alternate between Julia's prom and a birthday dinner set by Claudia, but is eventually caught; Julia finally reveals she was only interested in Debbie so she could ruin Claudia's life. Debbie has sex with Mickey's cousin Sandy. Carl becomes a police informant while working his garbage collection job, and his boss offers to give him an application to become a real police officer. To earn money, Kevin hires a man to do tasks for the Alibi. Lip is reluctant to move to Milwaukee with Tami after a house in the South Side neighborhood becomes available, despite Tami already securing a location to open a new salon in Milwaukee. Lip reveals to Tami that he has already bid on the property for the South Side house; Tami simply leaves, disappointed.
122	12	"Gallavich!"	John Wells	John Wells	January 26, 2020	0.92
After their original venue burns down, Mickey deduces that Terry was responsible, and he and Ian settle on a Polish establishment; Debbie pretends to be the bride due to the venue's homophobic owner. Kevin reveals that he has bought an engagement ring for Veronica, and she accepts his offer to marry him. At Mickey and Ian's wedding ceremony, Terry angrily storms in, but is forced to retread when security threatens him. Lip tries to convince Tami to stay in Chicago; she criticizes him for choosing his family over her, and is determined to leave with Fred for Milkwaukee without Lip. Heartbroken, Lip breaks his sobriety. After witnessing Lip ask Brad to take him to an AA meeting, Tami decides to help Lip work on his new house. The police show up at the Gallagher household to arrest Debbie for sleeping with the underaged Julia. While enjoying their honeymoon at a hotel, Ian and Mickey are hit by a drive-by shooting by Terry; despite the gunfire damaging the room, they laugh, unharmed.

== Casting ==
In January 2019, Cameron Monaghan, who previously departed the series in season 9, announced that he would be returning for the tenth season. In April 2019, it was announced that Noel Fisher will also return alongside Monaghan for the tenth season, his first time as a series regular since season 5.

== Ratings ==
Viewership and ratings per episode of Shameless season 10
No.	Title	Air date	Rating (18–49)	Viewers (millions)	DVR (18–49)	DVR viewers (millions)	Total (18–49)	Total viewers (millions)
1	"We Few, We Lucky Few, We Band of Gallaghers!"	November 10, 2019	0.2	0.76	0.4	1.09	0.6	1.85
2	"Sleep Well My Prince For Tomorrow You Shall Be King"	November 17, 2019	0.3	0.91	0.4	—N/a	0.7	—N/a
3	"Which America?"	November 24, 2019	0.2	0.84	—N/a	—N/a	—N/a	—N/a
4	"A Little Gallagher Goes a Long Way"	December 1, 2019	0.3	0.87	0.3	0.84	0.6	1.71
5	"Sparky"	December 8, 2019	0.3	0.83	0.3	0.85	0.6	1.68
6	"Adios Gringos"	December 15, 2019	0.2	0.89	0.3	0.86	0.5	1.76
7	"Citizen Carl"	December 22, 2019	0.2	0.84	0.4	0.98	0.6	1.82
8	"Debbie Might Be a Prostitute"	December 29, 2019	0.3	0.86	0.3	0.97	0.6	1.83
9	""O Captain, My Captain""	January 5, 2020	0.2	0.77	0.3	0.98	0.6	1.75
10	""Now Leaving Illinois""	January 12, 2020	0.2	0.89	0.4	—N/a	0.6	—N/a
11	"Location, Location, Location"	January 19, 2020	0.2	0.81	0.4	0.81	0.6	1.81
12	"Gallavich!"	January 26, 2020	0.3	0.92	0.3	0.91	0.6	1.83
