= Night Patrol (2025 film) =

Film by Ryan Prows

- Theatrical release poster
- Directed by: Ryan Prows
- Written by: Shaye Ogbonna; Ryan Prows; Tim Cairo; Jake Gibson
- Produced by: David S. Goyer; Keith Levine; Josh Goldbloom; James Harris
- Starring: Jermaine Fowler; Justin Long; Freddie Gibbs; RJ Cyler; Keenon Jackson; Nicki Micheaux; Flying Lotus; Phil Brooks; Dermot Mulroney
- Cinematography: Benjamin Kitchens
- Edited by: Bradinn French
- Music by: Pepijn Caudron
- Production company: Phantom Four Films
- Distributed by: RLJE Films; Shudder
- Release dates: September 19, 2025 (Fantastic Fest); January 16, 2026 (United States)
- Running time: 104 minutes
- Country: United States
- Language: English
- Box office: $372,115

Night Patrol is an American horror thriller film directed and co-written by Ryan Prows. The film stars Jermaine Fowler, Justin Long, Freddie Gibbs, RJ Cyler, Keenon Jackson, Nicki Micheaux, Flying Lotus, Phil Brooks, and Dermot Mulroney. It follows an L.A. police officer who must put aside his differences after discovering a task force harboring a secret that endangers the residents of the housing project where he grew up.

Produced by Phantom Four Films, it had its world premiere at Fantastic Fest on September 19, 2025, before releasing in the United States on January 16, 2026 by RLJE Films and Shudder. Night Patrol received mixed reviews from critics.

== Plot ==
A man named Wazi, handcuffed in a police interrogation room, is being given the opportunity to get medical treatment if he immediately signs a paper claiming responsibility for an unknown event.

In a flashback, Xavier Carr, a black LAPD officer and former Crip, and his partner, Ethan Hawkins—the son of a legendary but deceased sergeant, who is desperate to join the Night Patrol, an elite, secretive task force that operates exclusively after dark, are patroling the Colonial Courts housing projects in Los Angeles, where Xavier grew up.

The unit's true nature is revealed when Xavier's brother, Wazi, witnesses a Night Patrol officer brutally murder his fling, who is the sister of the leader of the rival gang the Bloods. Wazi discovers that the task force is composed of vampires who use their authority to feed on the projects' marginalized residents, disguising the deaths as gang violence. The unit is led by the mysterious Sarg and his brutal enforcer, Deputy. When Ethan is inducted into the night watch, he realizes his father was never dead and actually is the mysterious Sarge. Ethan believes he's been drugged but after realizing it is his father, understands that what he learned of the Night Patrol in the past is false and attempts to get away. He is held by other members of the Night Patrol before his father slits his own wrists and poors the blood in Ethan's mouth.

Wazi and his mother Ayanda devise a plan to contact Xavier and ask him to meet at the family's restaurant, believing he is meeting to only help his brother. When Xavier arrives, he is met by his brother, mother, and other Crip members. Xavier attempts to get Wazi to leave, however, he is chastised by their mother for choosing the police force over his family. When he attempts to leave with his new partner, Ayanda murders his partner to send a message, then she and the gang beat up Xavier for leaving the gang and turning his back on them.

When Xavier awakens, he calls in the murder and is informed the only police on duty are the Night Patrol. He wraps his wounds, prepares his weapons and right as he's about to head to the Courts, Ethan appears, cleaner and seemingly okay, but jumpy.

Ayanda and Wazi unite the rival Crips and Bloods to defend their neighborhood, repelling the Night Patrol's "cleansing" of the projects—a scheme to harvest residents' blood and store it for future feeding—with a combination of heavy weaponry and African mysticism.

As Xavier and Ethan make it to the courts, Ethan becomes violently ill as the vampire blood takes effect. He attempts to push Xavier away but instead ends up killing him. Wazi witnesses this and seems to be Ethan's next target, the Bloods show up and shoot Ethan down. When he reanimates, they shoot at him again but he's able to escape.

Ethan then kills one of his fellow Night Patrol, that is busy tormenting citizens that they've locked up to later drain of their blood. He continues when Deputy takes Wazi and some of the members of the Bloods back to a draining location. Ethan is only stopped when the vampire link between his father and himself, is controlled by his father. Ethan attempts to fight his father's will, going as far as slitting his own throat, but he learns there's no free will as a vampire.

Ethan catches up with Wazi and crew, but the leader of the Bloods stabs him with a wooden stake through the stomach. Ayanda explains the ancient magic of the Zulu people and how they were put on this earth to combat the “white devil”.

Ayanda is dying from an injury gained during the fighting and it is revealed that her husband was murdered to protect her sons from the Night Patrol after he became an informant for them. She then explains to him that there is one thing that can protect him, in a large box is old Zulu warrior attire and weapons. Ethan and Wazi fight, after Wazi dons the Zulu warrior attire, which badly wounds Wazi but kills Ethan.

A badly wounded Wazi faces a room full of LAPD officers, right after he kills Sarge, suggesting that the conspiracy within the department runs deeper than a single unit.

== Cast ==
- Jermaine Fowler as Xavier Carr
- Justin Long as Ethan Hawkins
- Freddie Gibbs as Bornelius
- RJ Cyler as Wazi Carr
- YG as Tripp
- Nicki Micheaux as Ayanda Carr
- Flying Lotus as Three Deuce
- Phil Brooks as Deputy
- Dermot Mulroney as Sarge
- Jon Oswald as Rivette

== Production ==
Ryan Prows co-wrote Night Patrol with Tim Cairo, Jake Gibson, and Shaye Ogbonna, while also serving as director. David S. Goyer and Keith Levine produced the film under the Phantom Four Films production company, as well as Josh Goldbloom and James Harris. XYZ Films executive produced and managed world sales, while financing was provided by Bondit Media Capital.

In October 2024, Justin Long, Jermaine Fowler, and RJ Cyler were cast in starring roles. Dermot Mulroney, CM Punk, Freddie Gibbs, YG, Flying Lotus, Jon Oswald, Nicki Micheaux, and RJ Cyler were also cast in the film.

Principal photography wrapped in Los Angeles in October 2024. Pepijn Caudron composed the score for the film.

== Release ==
In August 2025, RLJE Films and Shudder acquired the distribution rights to Night Patrol. The film had its world premiere at the Fantastic Fest on September 19, 2025. It also premiered at the Beyond Fest on September 28. The film was released in the United States on January 16, 2026. The film was originally scheduled to be released in 2025.

=== Critical reception ===
On the review aggregator website Rotten Tomatoes, 55% of 53 critics' reviews are positive, with an average rating of 5.7/10. The website's consensus reads: "Night Patrol boasts a killer premise and committed performances, but Ryan Prows' scattershot direction and an overstuffed screenplay undercut its cinematic prowess." Metacritic, which uses a weighted average, assigned the film a score of 53 out of 100, based on seven critics, indicating "mixed or average" reviews.
