= Sleep Well My Prince for Tomorrow You Shall Be King =

- Shameless episode
- Episode no.: Season 10; Episode 2
- Directed by: Jennifer Arnold
- Written by: Nancy M. Pimental
- Cinematography by: Anthony Hardwick
- Editing by: Michael S. Stern
- Original release date: November 17, 2019
- Running time: 56 minutes

Guest appearances
- Luis Guzmán as Mikey O'Shea (special guest star); Samantha Boscarino as Sabrina; Stephen Chang as Timothy; Sarah Colonna as Lori; Cameron Cowperthwaite as Batiste; Chelsea Rendon as Anne Gonzalez; Leon Russom as Chester; Aaron Lamm as Tanner; Jim Hoffmaster as Kermit; Michael Patrick McGill as Tommy

Episode chronology
← Previous "We Few, We Lucky Few, We Band of Gallaghers!"	Next → "Which America?"
- Shameless season 10

"Sleep Well My Prince for Tomorrow You Shall Be King" is the second episode of the tenth season of the American television comedy drama Shameless, an adaptation of the British series of the same name. It is the 112th overall episode of the series and was written by executive producer Nancy M. Pimental, and directed by Jennifer Arnold. It originally aired on Showtime on November 17, 2019.

The series is set on the South Side of Chicago, Illinois, and depicts the poor, dysfunctional family of Frank Gallagher, a neglectful single father of six: Fiona, Phillip, Ian, Debbie, Carl, and Liam. He spends his days drunk, high, or in search of money, while his children need to learn to take care of themselves. The family's status is shaken after Fiona chooses to leave. In the episode, Frank sets out to make money to keep his place in the house, but Mikey has bigger plans for him. Meanwhile, Lip struggles in raising his child, while Ian and Mickey face problems in prison.

According to Nielsen Media Research, the episode was seen by an estimated 0.91 million household viewers and gained a 0.30 ratings share among adults aged 18–49. The episode received generally positive reviews from critics, who considered it an improvement over the season premiere.

== Plot ==
In prison, Ian and Mickey try to have sex, but Mickey refuses to participate when Ian uses mayonnaise as lubricant. After fighting, Ian leaves for the infirmary, where he works. He asks a bedridden inmate, Chester (Leon Russom), for advice in his relationship.

While Tami is still in the hospital, Lip returns home with his child, whom he decides to name Fred in honor of Professor Youens. Without the family at home, he struggles in raising him, particularly feeling the need to smoke close to the baby. Lip also comes unprepared, as he has no diapers and is forced to improvise. Mikey has moved in the house with Frank, but they are warned by Debbie that they will have to pay rent and costs to continue living in the house. They try to scam by pretending to be hit by pedestrians in cars, but the efforts do not pay off and they are only able to collect $10.

Debbie tries to return expensive shoes she has bought just before the return policy passes. However, the clerk, Batista, notices the shoes are damaged and refuses to return her money. To get the money back, Debbie agrees to perform oral sex on him. However, he feels guilt and allows her to leave with the shoes. At the Alibi, a deliveryman is found unconscious in the bathroom after trying to masturbate while choking himself. Seizing the opportunity, Kevin and Veronica rob his truck, giving away many items to bar patrons. Carl returns to work at Captain Bob's, where he gets into conflicts with the new manager, Anne Gonzalez. Discovering that Anne sells vape paraphernalia, Carl convinces her in forming a partnership.

Lip falls asleep, and Veronica fortunately arrives in time to take care of Fred. She reminds him that the baby is his responsibility and cannot commit mistakes like that again. That night, Lip bathes with Fred in the bathtub. As they leave, he slips and almost drops the baby. Frank notices this, and tells him he is confident Lip would not hurt the baby. Lip subsequently has a breakdown. Mikey follows Debbie, discovering her storage unit with all her products. He steals her receipts, warning her to let Frank become the head of the house or he will destroy the receipts so she cannot return her items. The following day, Debbie gives debit cards to her family and assigns the role to Frank. Liam asks Frank about his African-American heritage, and Frank reveals that Monica's grandfather had an affair with a woman. That family is actually living near their house, but Frank is not welcome, with the owner threatening him with a shotgun.

== Production ==
=== Development ===
The episode was written by executive producer Nancy M. Pimental, and directed by Jennifer Arnold. It was Pimental's 23rd writing credit, and Arnold's first directing credit.

== Reception ==
=== Viewers ===
In its original American broadcast, "Sleep Well My Prince for Tomorrow You Shall Be King" was seen by an estimated 0.91 million household viewers with a 0.30 in the 18–49 demographics. This means that 0.30 percent of all households with televisions watched the episode. This was a 19 percent increase in viewership from the previous episode, which was seen by an estimated 0.76 million household viewers with a 0.21 in the 18–49 demographics.

=== Critical reviews ===
"Sleep Well My Prince for Tomorrow You Shall Be King" received generally positive reviews from critics. Myles McNutt of The A.V. Club gave the episode a "B–" grade and wrote, "this is an improvement on the premiere because there was the feeling that some — if not all — of these storylines are going somewhere, and have something to say about themes or characters that lie at the heart of the series. That's a step forward, if not necessarily enough of one to reduce my skepticism of the show's post-Fiona era."

Daniel Kurland of Den of Geek gave the episode a 3.5 star rating out of 5 and wrote "“Sleep Well My Prince For Tomorrow You Shall Be King” is a solid improvement from last week's safe premiere that pushes everyone a little further down the paths that they're on. The stories could still be a little less messy and Kevin and V remain largely superfluous, but the return of Ian and Mickey helps."

Kimberly Ricci of Uproxx wrote "Jeremy Allen White's performance in this episode tops everything that he did while Lip battled alcoholism, which presents the possibility that someone beyond William H. Macy might receive an Emmy nomination for their work on Shameless. Honestly, Macy can (and literally does, at times) play this role while dozing off on a well-worn couch, and Emmy Rossum did much more layered and nuanced work over nine seasons without those award accolades." Meaghan Darwish of TV Insider wrote "The Gallagher family shenanigans are at an all-time high as Shameless continues its landmark 10th season at Showtime. The series continues to carry us further into the future as Lip deals with the difficulties of being a new parent sans Tami's help and Ian and Mickey bicker as their reunion bliss deflates."
