= Alana Bright =

American actress

- Born: January 22, 2002 (age 24); San Antonio, Texas, US
- Occupation: Actress
- Years active: 2021–present

Alana Bright is an American actress. She is best known for playing Nikki Vaughn in the drama series Our Kind of People.

== Early life ==
Bright was born in San Antonio, Texas. She attended middle school in New Braunfels for three years. She studied acting, dance and voice at Kinder High School for the Performing and Visual Arts in Houston.

== Career ==
Before making her acting debut Bright was one of seven people to appear in the HBO MAX documentary Homeschool Musical:Class of 2020. It was an opportunity for people to perform their musicals online due to the disruption caused by the COVID-19 pandemic She secured an agent shortly after the documentary was aired. Her first big role came playing Nikki Vaughn in the drama series Our Kind of People. She has since had a recurring role in the sports drama series All American: Homecoming.

== Personal life ==
Outside of acting Bright also makes music inspired by her great-grandmother who lived with her from the age of 93 to her death at the age of 103. During the covid pandemic Bright produced her first film called Wine West.

== Filmography ==
=== Film ===
| Year | Title | Role | Notes |
|---|---|---|---|
| 2024 | Behold a Lady | Girl | Short |
| 2024 | Sundown | Jada | Short |

=== Television ===
| Year | Title | Role | Notes |
|---|---|---|---|
| 2021 | A Black College Show | Aaliyah | 2 episodes |
| 2021-2022 | Our Kind of People | Nikki Vaughn | 12 episodes |
| 2022 | The Blank's YPF | Ariya | Episode; Week 2 |
| 2022-2023 | All American: Homecoming | Melody | 4 episodes |
