= A Little Gallagher Goes a Long Way =

- Shameless episode
- Episode no.: Season 10; Episode 4
- Directed by: Iain B. MacDonald
- Written by: Joe Lawson
- Cinematography by: Anthony Hardwick
- Editing by: Michael S. Stern
- Original release date: December 1, 2019
- Running time: 56 minutes

Guest appearances
- Luis Guzmán as Mikey O'Shea (special guest star); Anthony Alabi as MaVar; Fayelyn Bilodeau as Patti; Lynn Chen as Mimi; Sarah Colonna as Lori; David DeLuise as Army Proctor; Jess Gabor as Kelly Keefe; Dylan Gelula as Megan; Danube Hermosillo as Pepa; Chelsea Rendon as Anne Gonzalez; Idara Victor as Sarah; Jordan L. Jones as Crackhead; Mike McColl as ICE Agent

Episode chronology
← Previous "Which America?"	Next → "Sparky"
- Shameless season 10

"A Little Gallagher Goes a Long Way" is the fourth episode of the tenth season of the American television comedy drama Shameless, an adaptation of the British series of the same name. It is the 114th overall episode of the series and was written by executive producer Joe Lawson, and directed by Iain B. MacDonald. It originally aired on Showtime on December 1, 2019.

The series is set on the South Side of Chicago, Illinois, and depicts the poor, dysfunctional family of Frank Gallagher, a neglectful single father of six: Fiona, Phillip, Ian, Debbie, Carl, and Liam. He spends his days drunk, high, or in search of money, while his children need to learn to take care of themselves. The family's status is shaken after Fiona chooses to leave. In the episode, Frank and Mikey attend a seminar while the latter's health deteriorates.

According to Nielsen Media Research, the episode was seen by an estimated 0.87 million household viewers and gained a 0.27 ratings share among adults aged 18–49. The episode received mixed reviews from critics, with many questioning the lack of character development.

== Plot ==
As Frank and Mikey wake up from their hangover. Debbie takes the money they made from the previous night, intending to use it to buy a new car. When Mikey reveals his lifelong dream in becoming a businessman, Frank decides to help him achieve it.

Lip attends an AA meeting for new parents, befriending a woman named Sarah. Sarah and her friends help Lip with some duties, and even suggest letting Fred be part of a swimming instruction. Lip is still nervous over her beliefs, as he fears she could harm Fred. Debbie runs into an old friend, Megan, who is also a mother. Megan relates the benefits of child support, and suggests Debbie should talk to Derek about it. Debbie visits Derek's family, but is shocked when they tell her Derek died in the Army after driving a tank under the influence into a river. Carl tells her she can collect a death benefit, where she can receive money as widow. However, Derek's family already collected and plan to spend it on his other children, without leaving anything for Franny.

Carl continues spending time with Anne, including learning cooking from her family. However, the family stays alert upon the arrival of U.S. Immigration and Customs Enforcement officers, hiding undocumented immigrants in their house. Carl is upset at the racial profiling of the family, as the officers intend to continue harassing the family. Liam accompanies MaVar to a family funeral, but draws his ire when he decides to collect money. When MaVar scolds him, Liam finally concludes he is not the person he thought he was and abandons him. After helping her new friend Mimi with her job, Veronica is offered a job as a sales representative.

Frank and Mikey sneak into a convention titled "The Art of Self Promotion" after stealing businessmen's briefcases. They use it to steal some of the items, as well as to take free samples of many meals and drinks. Afterwards, Frank takes Mikey to a prestigious bar, where Mikey decides to invite him a Gentleman Jack. Mikey thanks Frank for giving him the best time of his life, but admits he will not use their money for his surgery. He instead punches a police officer, landing him back in prison, but where he will receive treatment. Carl takes some of Anne's family to his house for a party, where Tami joins Lip. As Carl and Anne get close, he is surprised when Kelly suddenly returns.

== Production ==
=== Development ===
The episode was written by executive producer Joe Lawson, and directed by Iain B. MacDonald. It was Lawson's fourth writing credit, and MacDonald's eleventh directing credit.

== Reception ==
=== Viewers ===
In its original American broadcast, "A Little Gallagher Goes a Long Way" was seen by an estimated 0.87 million household viewers with a 0.27 in the 18–49 demographics. This means that 0.27 percent of all households with televisions watched the episode. This was a slight increase in viewership from the previous episode, which was seen by an estimated 0.84 million household viewers with a 0.22 in the 18–49 demographics.

=== Critical reviews ===
"A Little Gallagher Goes a Long Way" received mixed reviews from critics. Myles McNutt of The A.V. Club gave the episode a "C+" grade and wrote, "The title of this episode may be “A Little Gallagher Goes A Long Way,” but the truth is that the show's unwillingness to develop real long-term storylines which impact meaningful change is at the core of its struggles to justify its longevity."

Daniel Kurland of Den of Geek gave the episode a 4 star rating out of 5 and wrote "“A Little Gallagher Goes A Long Way” is a step up from the previous entries of this season as it brings many storylines to a close and begins to set up what's next for the Gallaghers. Characters actually make progress here and hopefully they'll be able to maintain that as this season turns up the heat a little. Episodes from this season have had a tendency to feel over-stuffed, but this entry finds an easy balance and is smart to leave out characters like Ian and Mickey."

Kimberly Ricci of Uproxx wrote "Will we see Mavar again, and will there be a change of heart from Liam? Maybe that's where the show will eventually end up. I hope so because I'd watch the heck out of a “Liam and Mavar” buddy-comedy series." Meaghan Darwish of TV Insider wrote "The latest episodes sees the family deal with various challenges, some successes, and a few awkward situations — from Frank's and Mikey's continued shenanigans to Lip's parenthood journey and Debbie's major revelation about her baby daddy."
