= Gallavich! =

- Shameless episode
- Episode no.: Season 10; Episode 12
- Directed by: John Wells
- Written by: John Wells
- Cinematography by: Anthony Hardwick
- Editing by: Mark Strand
- Original release date: January 26, 2020
- Running time: 58 minutes

Guest appearances
- Juliette Angelo as Geneva; Scott Michael Campbell as Brad; Dennis Cockrum as Terry Milkovich; Elise Eberle as Sandy Milkovich; Alison Jaye as Julia Nicolo; O-Lan Jones as Zuzanna Wojcik; Alison White as Reverend Sally; Jim Hoffmaster as Kermit; Michael Patrick McGill as Tommy

Episode chronology
← Previous "Location, Location, Location"	Next → "This Is Chicago!"
- Shameless season 10

"Gallavich!" is the twelfth episode and season finale of the tenth season of the American television comedy drama Shameless, an adaptation of the British series of the same name. It is the 122nd overall episode of the series and was written and directed by series developer John Wells. It originally aired on Showtime on January 26, 2020.

The series is set on the South Side of Chicago, Illinois, and depicts the poor, dysfunctional family of Frank Gallagher, a neglectful single father of six: Fiona, Phillip, Ian, Debbie, Carl, and Liam. He spends his days drunk, high, or in search of money, while his children need to learn to take care of themselves. The family's status is shaken after Fiona chooses to leave. In the episode, the family helps Ian and Mickey in setting their wedding.

According to Nielsen Media Research, the episode was seen by an estimated 0.92 million household viewers and gained a 0.29 ratings share among adults aged 18–49. The episode received mostly positive reviews from critics, who considered the episode as a satisfying closure to the season's mixed response.

== Plot ==
Lip goes to the RV to talk to Tami, finding that she left with Fred and also left a note for Lip that reads "Go fuck yourself" along with her key. He locates her at Brad's house, but she refuses to talk to him, and drives off with Fred.

As they prepare for the wedding, the family is alarmed when they discover that the wedding venue has been burned down. Mickey immediately deduces Terry was responsible, and takes a shotgun to kill him, only to be stopped by Ian and the family. Mickey is handcuffed, while the family considers other options. They settle on a Polish establishment, but due to the venue's homophobic state, they have to pretend Debbie will be the bride. Julia crashes the wedding, despite Debbie cutting off any contact with her. Liam also tricks Frank in attending the ceremony, by falsely claiming that Lip would sell the house without leaving him any money.

At the venue, the Gallaghers distract the owner, Zuzanna Wojcik, by having her "console" Debbie when she cannot go forward with the wedding. With this, the wedding goes as planned, and Ian and Mickey are officially married. Terry discovers about the new venue and angrily drives there, but is forced to retreat when security threatens him. While everyone celebrates, Ian laments to Debbie that Monica could not live to be there for him, knowing she would enjoy it. Zuzanna discovers the real wedding, but Frank distracts her by kissing her. Lip is surprised when Tami and Fred show up, and approaches them before they leave. Lip and Tami get into a heated argument, with Tami proclaiming that Lip loves his family more than he loves her. She is determined in leaving for Milwaukee with Fred, and threatens to go to trial if Lip intervenes. Heartbroken, Lip breaks his sobriety.

Veronica is puzzled when Kevin claims he is making no money at his new fitness business despite getting customers. When she confronts him, Kevin is forced to reveal that he bought an engagement ring for her, and she accepts to marry him. Julia calls Claudia to tell her that she is with Debbie at the wedding, and proceeds to sleep with Carl at his house. Lip visits Brad to ask him in taking him to an AA meeting, which is seen by Tami. The following day, Lip starts working on his new house, and is surprised when Tami joins him to help. The police show up at the Gallagher household to arrest Debbie for sleeping with Julia, and she flees the scene. Ian and Mickey enjoy their honeymoon at a hotel, when they are hit by a drive-by shooting by Terry. Despite damaging the room, they laugh, unharmed.

== Production ==
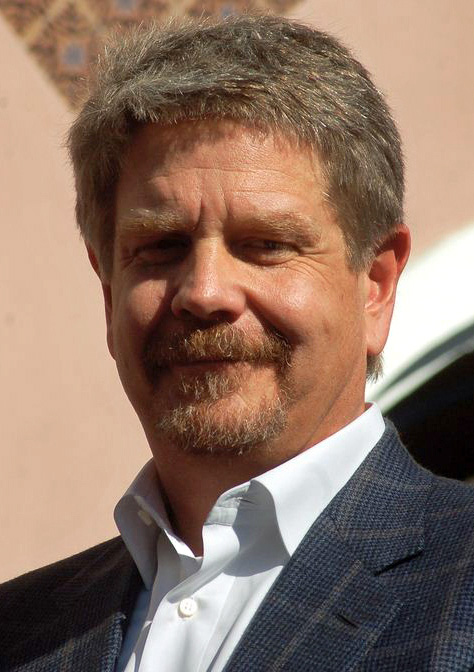
The episode was written and directed by John Wells.

The episode was written and directed by series developer John Wells. It was Wells' 22nd writing credit and tenth directing credit.

== Reception ==
=== Viewers ===
In its original American broadcast, "Gallavich!" was seen by an estimated 0.92 million household viewers with a 0.29 in the 18–49 demographics. This means that 0.29 percent of all households with televisions watched the episode. This was a 13 percent increase in viewership from the previous episode, which was seen by an estimated 0.81 million household viewers with a 0.22 in the 18–49 demographics.

=== Critical reviews ===
"Gallavich!" received mostly positive reviews from critics. Myles McNutt of The A.V. Club gave the episode a "B+" grade and wrote, "Doing so won't undo the damage done over the past few seasons, but it will at least help honor those in the audience who have stuck around out of affection for several of these characters even as their frustration with their actions has risked overwhelming that affection. “Gallavich!” felt like a moment when affection won out, but sustaining that for a final season is going to be an entirely different challenge. I sincerely hope they're up for it."

Daniel Kurland of Den of Geek gave the episode a 3.5 star rating out of 5 and wrote "“Gallavich!” is far from a perfect episode of Shameless, but it's perhaps the best episode of the season and concludes on a satisfying note. Even without a gratuitous cameo or even a mention of Fiona, the rest of the Gallaghers are enough to make this finale work." Kimberly Ricci of Uproxx wrote "“Gallovich” officially happened. Ian and Mickey Milkovich tied the knot after things looked hopeless on several occasions, and Mickey became a Groomzilla. The actual ceremony went off without much of a further hitch within their relationship, even though Mickey's dad burnt down the planned venue, but that gave rise to a better shindig. Ultimately, the wedding was everything fans probably wanted it to be."

Megan Vick of TV Guide wrote "It's a day many Shameless fans once thought might never arrive: Gallavich - got hitched in the Season 10 finale of Showtime's longest-running series, and it was the best wedding you could hope to see for the beloved couple." Paul Dailly of TV Fanatic gave the episode a perfect 5 star rating out of 5 and wrote ""Gallavich" could have served as the series finale. Bringing the characters together for this momentous occasion capped off the worst season to date."
