= Michelle Meyrink =

Canadian teacher and former actress

- Born: September 1, 1962 (age 63); Vancouver, British Columbia, Canada
- Occupations: Actress, teacher
- Years active: 1983–1988
- Spouse: John Dumbrille
- Children: 3

Michelle Meyrink (born September 1, 1962) is a Canadian teacher and former actress.

== Early life ==
Meyrink was born on September 1, 1962, in Vancouver, British Columbia, Canada, and began acting at an early age.

== Acting career ==
She performed roles during the 1980s in both television and in feature films, mostly playing roles as offbeat teen girls. She appeared in many comedy films, including 1983's Valley Girl as Suzi Brent, and she also appeared in The Outsiders as Cherry Valance's best friend, Marcia. In 1984, she guest-starred on the television show Family Ties as Mallory's friend (and neighbor Skippy's latest infatuation).

She is best remembered as the female nerd Judy in the 1984 comedy Revenge of the Nerds and as the hyperactive whiz-kid Jordan Cochran in Martha Coolidge's 1985 film Real Genius. Her last Hollywood role was in the 1988 film Permanent Record.

== Post-acting ==
Meyrink gave up acting as a career in 1989, stating she wanted more out of life than the profession was offering. During this transition period she became interested in the practice of Zen Buddhism. She moved for a time to the Dominican Republic to be near family members living there. Meyrink later returned to her hometown of Vancouver, where in 1996 she met her future husband John Dumbrille at the Zen Centre of Vancouver. Following their wedding, she and John began raising a family of three children.

Meyrink and Dumbrille currently live in Vancouver. Her family was the subject of a 2004 episode of the Canadian television series Quiet Mind, which focused on their embrace and practice of Zen Buddhism.

In 2013 Meyrink started her own acting school named Actorium in Vancouver. It is modeled, in part, after the Loft Studio, which she attended with other Hollywood actors while she worked in Los Angeles.

== Filmography ==
Year	Title	Role	Notes
1983	The Outsiders	Marcia	
1983	Valley Girl	Suzi Brent	
1984	Revenge of the Nerds	Judy	
1984	National Lampoon's Joy of Sex	Leslie Hindenberg	
1984	Family Ties	Jane	Episode: "Don't Kiss Me, I'm Only the Messenger"
1985	Real Genius	Jordan Cochran	
1985	One Magic Christmas	Betty	
1987	Tonight's the Night	Steffi	TV movie
1987	Nice Girls Don't Explode	April Flowers	
1988	Permanent Record	M.G.	(final film role)
