= Flight of Black Angel =

- VHS cover
- Genre: Thriller
- Screenplay by: Henry Dominic
- Story by: Henry Dominic; Jonathan Mostow
- Directed by: Jonathan Mostow
- Starring: Peter Strauss; William O'Leary; James O'Sullivan; Michele Pawk; Michael Keys Hall
- Music by: Rick Marvin
- Country of origin: United States
- Original language: English

Production
- Executive producers: Danielle Doty; Michael C. Green
- Producers: Kevin M. Kallberg; Oliver G. Hess
- Cinematography: Lee Redmond
- Editor: Barry Zetlin
- Running time: 115 minutes
- Production companies: Trimark Pictures; Hess/Kallberg Productions

Original release
- Network: Showtime
- Release: February 23, 1991

Flight of Black Angel is a 1991 American thriller television film directed by Jonathan Mostow and written by John Brancato and Michael Ferris (under the pseudonym Henry Dominic). It stars Peter Strauss and William O'Leary, with James O'Sullivan, Michele Pawk, and Michael Keys Hall in supporting roles. In the film, a United States Air Force pilot murders his family and steals an aircraft at gunpoint. The authorities try to capture him before he detonates a tactical nuclear weapon.

The film aired on Showtime on February 23, 1991.

== Plot ==
Captain Eddie Gordon, a graduate of the United States Air Force academy, is a talented and aggressive pilot who proves too much in training exercises for the academy's students, leading many of them to quit for loss of confidence and nearly killing one in a head-on collision. His flight instructor, Lieutenant Colonel Matthew Ryan, encourages him to practice restraint, but with little success.

After his birthday party at his home in Las Vegas, Eddie puts a religiously motivated long-organized plan into action. He kills his brother and his parents. During preparation for more training exercises the next morning, Eddie holds Captain Melissa Gaiter of the Air Force base at gunpoint and forces her to arm his IAI Kfir C1 with live ordnance, a radar-jamming pod and a tactical nuclear weapon. Melissa refuses to cooperate with the last request, so Eddie murders her and swaps the serial numbers with a dummy bomb in order to trick the crew into loading the nuclear weapon.

Colonel Bill Douglas of the base's flight control is informed of the triple murder at the Gordons' residence while the training exercise is underway. Eddie ignores messages that his plane has been shot down under the rules of the exercise and kills the unarmed students. After attempting to persuade Eddie to land, Matthew alerts the base and lures Eddie into the firing range of the base's surface-to-air missiles (SAMs). Eddie destroys the SAMs, Matthew's plane, and the airbase runway. Matthew ejects before crashing.

Eddie lands in Garrison, Utah, to hide his jet in a deserted barn and take as hostages a family on vacation, Richard and Valerie Dwyer and their baby.

A nuclear weapons expert, Harvey Glatman, says the stolen nuke is not a threat, since to disable the fail-safes Eddie would have to dismantle the nuke, thereby exposing himself to a lethal dose of plutonium. But Matthew believes that Eddie is unconcerned with his own life, and the 36–48 hours it will take him to die from radiation is enough for him to use the nuke. While Eddie works on defeating the fail-safes on the tactical nuke, he is exposed to the radiation, and his health quickly deteriorates. The next day, he and Valerie leave for a hardware store in a nearby city to obtain tools. Valerie uses a traveler's check and writes their hostage location on the back, but the clerk does not notice. Valerie then persuades Eddie to go to a drug store to treat his vomiting and nausea. She repeats the same practice, and the pharmacist notices Valerie's notes on the check.

Two police officers arrive to investigate. Eddie engages them in a firefight. Richard and Valerie flee with their baby; however, Eddie shoots the two officers, Richard, and Valerie. Richard dies, and Valerie is seriously wounded. Paralyzed from the waist down, Valerie collects her baby and crawls to the roadside, where she is picked up by a truck driver.

Matthew is cross-checking police leads when the report of Valerie comes in. She insists that she has seen Eddie working on a bomb. Just before a surgery, Matthew learns Eddie's target from Valerie: Las Vegas. Matthew convinces Douglas to concentrate on Las Vegas; he travels to Hill AFB to take an F-16 fighter plane to fly lead. Although Eddie cannot launch the bomb, his jet fuel could detonate the bomb if he is fired upon. In order to get the bomb away from civilians, Matthew provokes Eddie into a duel to prove the divine nature of his "mission". After evading Eddie's last missile, Matthew orders the other pilots to clear away and then fires on Eddie. Both pilots and 36 people on the ground are incinerated.

A recovering Valerie and her baby receive sanitized TV news on the incident in her hospital bed. The report asserts that the pilots were on a "training mission" in the area.

== Cast ==
- Peter Strauss as Lieutenant Colonel Matthew Ryan
- William O'Leary as Captain Eddie Gordon
- James O'Sullivan as Colonel Bill Douglas
- Michele Pawk as Valerie Dwyer
- Michael Keys Hall as Richard Dwyer
- K. Callan as Mrs. Gordon
- Ben Rawnsley as Mr. Gordon
- Rodney Eastman as Bobby Gordon
- Marcus Chong as Dragonfly
- Jerry Bossard as Bulldog
- Patricia Sill as Captain Melissa Gaiter
- Kim Robillard as Sgt. Carter
- James Henriksen as Harvey Glatman
- Ed Williams as Dispatcher
- Michael Gregory as Falcon One
- Scott Menville as Teen in Store

Comic book writer and publisher Dennis Mallonee has an uncredited role as the pharmacist who alerts police to the hostage situation. John D. Brancato, who wrote the screenplay with Michael Ferris under their usual pseudonym, Henry Dominic, has a cameo as a clerk.

== Release ==
The film was released on video in Japan on January 25, 1991, before being broadcast on Showtime on February 23, 1991. The DVD was first released in Finland on September 9, 2003. It was released under the title Flight of the Black Angel in some regions.
