= Lowlife (2017 film) =

- Theatrical release poster
- Directed by: Ryan Prows
- Written by: Tim Cairo; Jake Gibson; Shaye Ogbonna; Ryan Prows; Maxwell Michael Towson
- Produced by: Narineh Hacopian; Derek Bishé; Tim Cairo
- Starring: Nicki Micheaux; Ricardo Adam Zarate; Jon Oswald; Shaye Ogbonna; Santana Dempsey; Mark Burnham; King Orba
- Cinematography: Benjamin Kitchens
- Edited by: Brett W. Bachman; Jarod Shannon
- Music by: Kreng
- Distributed by: IFC Midnight
- Release dates: August 28, 2017 (FrightFest); April 6, 2018
- Running time: 96 minutes
- Country: United States
- Language: English

Lowlife is a 2017 American black comedy crime thriller film co-written and directed by Ryan Prows. It had its world premiere at the 2017 Fantasia International Film Festival.

== Plot ==
The plot is split into four intermingling non-linear narratives; "Monsters", "Fiends" "Thugs" and "Criminals". The following synopsis presents the events in a chronological order.

In an unspecified poverty stricken neighborhood in Los Angeles, local crime lord Teddy "Bear" Haynes operates a taco shack as a front for a human trafficking ring. With the help of corrupt ICE Agent Fowler, Teddy kidnaps illegal immigrants who he sells into prostitution and illegal organ harvesting.

Teddy's adoptive daughter Kaylee, is pregnant with the child of "El Monstruo", the mantle in a legendary line of luchadors, the "protector of the downtrodden". The current El Monstruo, now disgraced, has fallen on hard times and works as a henchman and enforcer for Teddy.

Kaylee's biological parents, Crystal and Dan are recovering drug addicts who manage a run down motel. Believing she would have a better life, they "sold" her to Teddy, who, unbeknownst to them, prostituted her before El Monstruo "saved her"; pledging himself to his service in her place. Teddy, who is aware that Dan requires a new kidney, informs Crystal that Kaylee has apparently offered him one of hers, which she reluctantly accepts.

El Monstruo lives in contempt and hopes that his unborn son, will be able to bring honour back to the legacy he disgraced. After El Monstruo fails to get Teddy's money back from a man whom he kills in a blind rage, Teddy fires him and orders a hit on both him and Kaylee.

Meanwhile, an ex-convict named Keith arrives at California State Prison to pick up his friend Randy after a lengthy stretch. Keith, an African-American, is disgusted to find that while in prison, Randy had a Nazi swastika tattooed over his entire face. Randy denies being a Nazi, telling Keith that it was something he was forced to do in order to stay alive in prison. He explains that prison has given him an understanding of different cultures and he has learned fluent Spanish.

Keith was Teddy's accountant, until he was caught embezzling money from him. Teddy gives the pair an ultimatum; they must kidnap Kaylee to settle the debt, or Teddy will kill Keith's wife and children.

When Kaylee fails to convince the naive and loyal El Monstruo to flee town, she threatens to hurt their baby. In response, he falls into a blind rage and loses consciousness. Crystal drives to Kaylee's house and discovers that she is pregnant. While attempting in vain to cancel the procedure, she witnesses Keith and Randy force Kaylee into a car.

Fleeing back to the motel, Crystal finds that Dan has committed suicide after discovering that Crystal was buying Kaylee's kidney. El Monstruo wakes up to find Kaylee gone and their house a ruin. While searching for Kaylee, he is attacked by Agent Fowler and falls into another rage - Waking outside Crystal's run down motel, holding Fowler's bloody hand with no memory of how he came there.

As the guilt stricken Crystal grieves behind the front desk, Randy and Keith arrive. Shocked, Crystal gives them a room. Randy wants to go through with the kidnapping, fearing Teddy's wrath, but Keith is unsure.

El Monstruo arrives to use the payphone. However, instead of making a call, he mistakenly uses the intercom function. inadvertently informing Crystal that he is also looking for Kaylee. Taking Dan's shotgun, Crystal confronts El Monstruo in the parking lot. Kaylee's water breaks, and as Keith and Randy argue about what to do, El Monstruo and Crystal burst in.

Teddy drives to Crystal's motel and enters the hotel room to find Kaylee giving birth and the others helping her. He orders El Monstruo to bring him Kaylee. Having learned about his legend in prison, Randy appeals to El Monstruo in Spanish, inspiring the luchador to turn on Teddy. The crime lord, wielding an assault rifle, kidnaps Kaylee and the group give chase in Crystal's van.

Keith, who has been shot in the arm, implores that must they rescue the girl before he dies of blood-loss. El Monstruo leads the trio into the basement of the taco shack, where they find Kaylee and the baby, now born, unharmed in a meat fridge; He inexplicably runs out of the building with his son, exclaiming "Legacy is all!". Randy and Crystal try to escape with Kaylee but are forced to barricade themselves inside.

El Monstruo has a change of heart when he sees more corrupt ICE agents entering the restaurant. He returns to save the others, killing the agents while Randy fights Teddy. Kaylee and Crystal flee, but they are confronted by Agent Fowler who they are forced to kill. The luchador, though severely wounded, manages to overpower Teddy, beating his head to a pulp with his legendary rage.

Randy finds El Monstruo mortally wounded. He promises to look after the mask until his son can take up the mantle, but El Monstruo refuses to burden his son's life with it. Randy implores El Monstruo not to allow the lineage to be broken, but he only asks Randy to free the prostitutes before he dies.

Instead, Randy himself takes up the mask, which perfectly covers his swastika tattoo. He frees the prostitutes and leads them back to Mexico ("Our native land"). Crystal and Kaylee sit together in the van. Kaylee asks if Crystal is her mother, she doesn't reply but gives Kaylee a tearful, telling glance. They hug each other while Kaylee remarks "I'm going to need some help".

== Cast ==
- Nicki Micheaux as Crystal
- Ricardo Adam Zarate as El Monstruo
- Jon Oswald as Randy
- Shaye Ogbonna as Keith
- Santana Dempsey as Kaylee
- Mark Burnham as Teddy "Bear" Haynes
- King Orba as Dan

== Reception ==
On the review aggregator website Rotten Tomatoes, the film holds an approval rating of 91%, based on 35 reviews, and an average rating of 7.4/10. The website's consensus reads, "A darkly funny crime chronicle, Lowlife presents a Los Angeles teeming with memorable characters and propulsive style." On Metacritic, the film has a weighted average score of 66 out of 100, based on 7 critics, indicating "generally favorable" reviews.

Dennis Harvey of Variety wrote that it "Nicely calibrates a twisty course between straight crime melodrama and black comedy, one that has cult-following potential among adventurous genre fans." John DeFore from The Hollywood Reporter wrote that it's "A captivating feature debut despite some missteps, it flashes back to a time when every other filmmaking newcomer wanted to be Quentin Tarantino; surprisingly, it does not provoke the weary eye-rolling that greeted so many of those films."
