= Sparkie =

Sparkie may refer to:

- Sparkie Williams, a talking budgie
- Sparkie (satellite), a satellite that failed to reach orbit
- Sparkie, an elf in the radio series Big Jon and Sparkie
- Sparkie, a dragon in the television series Mike the Knight
- "Sparkie", a track on For Real!, the debut album of Ruben and the Jets
- A slang term for an electrician

== See also ==
- Sparky (disambiguation)
