= Paul Harris (magician) =

American inventor, magician, and writer

- Born: Paul Tomas Harris; United States
- Occupation(s): Magician, writer

Paul Tomas Harris is an American inventor, magician, and writer. Described by the magic magazine Genii (December 1996) as "the most innovative magic mind of our day," Harris is listed in Magic magazine (August 1999) as one of "the 100 [magicians] who shaped the art [of magic] in America".

== Biography ==
He has invented many original tricks including: "Linking playing cards", "Bizarre twist", "A Solid Deck" and many others.

Magic magazine (August 1999) states that "the feats of astonishments that Paul creates and teaches are in the repertoires of a multitude of working pros".

Harris has performed at the Dunes Hotel and at other locations on the Las Vegas Strip, and was a technical advisor for David Blaine's Magic Man and Street Magic TV shows. He also contributed writing to the 1987 film Nice Girls Don't Explode.

In 2007, his effect 'LadyBug' won third place in The Magic Woods Awards for Best Trick 2007.

== Notable works ==
Harris has contributed significantly to the cannon of instructional material for magicians.

- Featured in an issue of the DVD-formatted magazine, Reel Magic.
