= Which America? =

- Shameless episode
- Episode no.: Season 10; Episode 3
- Directed by: Silver Tree
- Written by: Molly Smith Metzler
- Cinematography by: Anthony Hardwick
- Editing by: Russell Denove
- Original release date: November 24, 2019
- Running time: 58 minutes

Guest appearances
- Luis Guzmán as Mikey O'Shea (special guest star); Anthony Alabi as MaVar; John Billingsley as Dr. Drew; Scott Michael Campbell as Brad; Lynn Chen as Mimi; Sarah Colonna as Lori; Fay Hauser as Addie; Chelsea Rendon as Anne Gonzalez; Idara Victor as Sarah; Jim Hoffmaster as Kermit; Michael Patrick McGill as Tommy; Eddie Alfano as K.J.; Peter Banifaz as Farhad; Catero Alain Colbert as Cobb; Alex Désert as Union Jerry; Tim de Zarn as Nana; Rey Gallegos as Dallas

Episode chronology
← Previous "Sleep Well My Prince for Tomorrow You Shall Be King"	Next → "A Little Gallagher Goes a Long Way"
- Shameless season 10

"Which America?" is the third episode of the tenth season of the American television comedy drama Shameless, an adaptation of the British series of the same name. It is the 113th overall episode of the series and was written by supervising producer Molly Smith Metzler, and directed by executive producer Silver Tree. It originally aired on Showtime on November 24, 2019.

The series is set on the South Side of Chicago, Illinois, and depicts the poor, dysfunctional family of Frank Gallagher, a neglectful single father of six: Fiona, Phillip, Ian, Debbie, Carl, and Liam. He spends his days drunk, high, or in search of money, while his children need to learn to take care of themselves. The family's status is shaken after Fiona chooses to leave. In the episode, Lip looks for support as the new pressures of fatherhood begin to take a toll. Meanwhile, Frank and Mikey decide to steal Debbie's expensive clothes, and Ian and Mickey talk over their future.

According to Nielsen Media Research, the episode was seen by an estimated 0.84 million household viewers and gained a 0.22 ratings share among adults aged 18–49. The episode received mixed reviews from critics, who criticized the lack of progress in the storylines.

== Plot ==
The debit cards that Debbie provided the family are declined, as she used their social security numbers, and the banks used the money she put in to pay their other unpaid expenses. Debbie becomes a union leader at her job, but realizes that her co-workers plan to go on strike for an undefined period.

Needing the money, Frank and Mikey steal some of Debbie's clothing from her storage unit. Frank tries to make a quick sale at the Alibi, but Kevin only pays him $100, which he proceeds to take back as Frank owes the bar more money. In prison, Ian is informed that he will received an early parole hearing, but Mickey is not content. Mickey is upset that Ian could once again leave him, after he did everything to be placed in the same cell as him. Lip is upset by Debbie's actions, as his payment at the shop was cut in half. He later visits Tami at the hospital, after she finally recovered from the surgery. While Tami likes Fred, she does not want to carry him and asks Lip to take him.

At Captain Bob's, Anne (Chelsea Rendon) flirts with Carl . Despite making clear he has a girlfriend, Carl nevertheless joins Anne to dine with her family. Liam (Christian Isaiah) visits the house in his street, meeting the owner, MaVar. While MaVar hates Frank and his family, he decides to spend the day with Liam. MaVar helps him learn more about the African-American experience, and even takes him to a baseball game. Seeing that Veronica has no friends to hang out with, Kevin decides to use Tinder to get girls to the Alibi to compete. Veronica kicks them out when she learns of Kevin's plan, although she ends up bonding with one of them.

Ian prepares to stab a man to suspend his parole, but Mickey stops him, after finally realizing Ian deserves to leave. To apologize, Mickey sneaks in a phone for Ian. Frank takes Mikey to a vet when he feels sick, discovering that he has a severe kidney disease. Requiring money for a surgery, Frank and Mikey steal the rest of Debbie's items in the storage unit to pay for the procedure. They use the rest of the money to buy beer and throw a party at the house to earn more money. Seeing the condition of his house, MaVar allows Liam to sleep at his house. With the party, Lip is forced to sleep at the Alibi with Fred. He is suddenly called through FaceTime by Ian, who is delighted to finally meet his nephew.

== Production ==
=== Development ===
The episode was written by supervising producer Molly Smith Metzler, and directed by executive producer Silver Tree. It was Smith Metzler's fifth writing credit, and Tree's second directing credit.

== Reception ==
=== Viewers ===
In its original American broadcast, "Which America?" was seen by an estimated 0.84 million household viewers with a 0.22 in the 18–49 demographics. This means that 0.22 percent of all households with televisions watched the episode. This was a 6 percent decrease in viewership from the previous episode, which was seen by an estimated 0.91 million household viewers with a 0.30 in the 18–49 demographics.

=== Critical reviews ===
"Which America?" received mixed reviews from critics. Myles McNutt of The A.V. Club gave the episode a "C" grade and wrote, "Ian's return to the outside world will likely reorganize the story dynamics a bit, and it's a shuffling that Shameless desperately needs: rather than building a foundation for future stories, these opening episodes have mostly shown a collection of unproductive instincts on how to carry this show an extra season or two."

Daniel Kurland of Den of Geek gave the episode a 3 star rating out of 5 and wrote "“Which America?” is another solid episode of the series, but the pace of this season continues to be much slower than previous years. Shameless has a tendency to catapult through storylines, so it's a welcome change to see these characters all take a breath. However, this is causing stories to spin their wheels or barely progress from week-to-week."

Kimberly Ricci of Uproxx wrote "It’s a damn respectable move for Mickey to come to his senses and tell Ian that he must fly free, live his life, and all that jazz. Yet I hope that this decision doesn't mean that we'll be saying goodbye to Mickey Milkovich again. I don't think the fandom could tolerate it." Meaghan Darwish of TV Insider wrote "Things pick up where they left off as the family tries to access funds Debbie funneled into debit cards for them, but when the transactions don't go smoothly, the predicaments get even more out of control."
