= One Magic Christmas =

1985 film by Phillip Borsos

- Theatrical release poster
- Directed by: Phillip Borsos
- Screenplay by: Thomas Meehan
- Story by: Thomas Meehan; Phillip Borsos; Barry Healey
- Produced by: Peter O'Brian
- Starring: Mary Steenburgen; Gary Basaraba; Michelle Meyrink; Elisabeth Harnois; Arthur Hill; Harry Dean Stanton
- Cinematography: Frank Tidy
- Edited by: Sidney Wolinsky
- Music by: Michael Conway Baker
- Production companies: Walt Disney Pictures; Silver Screen Partners II; Telefilm Canada
- Distributed by: Buena Vista Distribution
- Release date: November 22, 1985
- Running time: 90 minutes
- Countries: Canada; United States
- Language: English
- Budget: $7.5 million
- Box office: $13 million

One Magic Christmas is a 1985 Christmas fantasy film directed by Phillip Borsos. It was released by Walt Disney Pictures and stars Mary Steenburgen and Harry Dean Stanton. It was shot in Meaford, Ontario with some scenes in Owen Sound, Ontario, Canada.

== Plot ==
Saint Nicholas assigns the Christmas angel Gideon to restore the Christmas spirit of Ginnie Grainger, the mother of Cal and Abbie. Her husband Jack has been out of work for six months, and they must vacate their company-owned house by the new year. Ginnie works as a grocery store cashier while Jack fixes bikes as a hobby and dreams of opening his own bike shop, which Ginnie opposes since it would use up all the family savings.

Two nights before Christmas Eve, Abbie meets Gideon while mailing a letter to Santa Claus. Gideon asks her to have her mother mail it instead and protects Abbie from being hit by a speeding car. Abbie gives the letter to her mother, but she refuses to mail it.

The family visits Jack's grandfather Caleb, who gives Abbie a snow globe of the North Pole. Gideon visits Abbie again and warns her that some bad things are going to happen, but she should not be afraid. He "accidentally" drops and shatters her snow globe, then magically restores it. Ginnie and Jack discuss their finances and Ginnie tells Jack he should find a new job instead of opening the bike shop. Frustrated, he leaves the house to go for a walk. She chases after him and meets Gideon. All the Christmas lights on the street around her turn off.

While on her way to work on Christmas Eve, Ginnie meets Harry Dickens, who is trying to sell some of his possessions in order to support himself and his son. Meanwhile, Jack leaves Cal and Abbie in his car while he goes to the bank to withdraw some of their savings for Christmas shopping. Abbie visits Ginnie at the grocery store and tells her about Jack going to the bank. Ginnie leaves to stop him and her boss fires her. She returns Abbie to the car and interrupts Harry robbing the bank at gunpoint. Jack attempts to calm Harry down, but he impulsively shoots and kills Jack. He flees in Jack's car with Cal and Abbie still inside. Ginnie chases after him in Harry's car, but runs out of gas before she can catch him. Harry swerves to avoid the police, but skids off a bridge into the river. Believing she has lost her husband and children, Ginnie returns to the house grief-stricken. Gideon rescues the children and the police bring them home. Ginnie sadly breaks the news to Cal and Abbie about Jack.

Abbie goes to the town's Christmas tree to find Gideon and asks him to bring back her father. He tells her he can't and that Santa Claus is the only person who can. Gideon takes Abbie to the North Pole to see Santa, who informs her that he also cannot fix what has happened or make her mother feel better, but perhaps Abbie can. He shows her his workshop, which is a factory run by Christmas angels instead of elves. He retrieves a letter Ginnie sent him as a child and tells Abbie to give it to her mother.

Gideon returns Abbie to her house and she gives her mother the letter. Reading it makes Ginnie realize that the spirit of Christmas is to be thankful for what she has. She mails Abbie's letter and says goodbye to Gideon. All the Christmas lights on the street come back on and Ginnie sees Jack walking through the neighbourhood as he did two days before Christmas.

The next day, Ginnie's boss gives her the day off so she can spend it with her family. At the gas station, she buys Harry's camp stove causing him to not rob the bank. That evening, she attends the tree lighting in the village square and joins the participants in singing O Christmas Tree. Later, the family is celebrating Christmas at Caleb's and she writes a cheque to Jack for the bike shop as a Christmas present. Ginnie hears Santa downstairs and finds him putting presents under the tree. He tells her "Merry Christmas, Ginnie" and she says it in return.

== Cast ==
- Mary Steenburgen as Ginnie Grainger
- Gary Basaraba as Jack Grainger
- Harry Dean Stanton as Gideon
- Arthur Hill as Caleb Grainger
- Robbie Magwood as Cal Grainger
- Elisabeth Harnois as Abbie Grainger
- Michelle Meyrink as Betty
- Elias Koteas as Eddie
- Wayne Robson as Harry Dickens
- Jan Rubeš as Saint Nicholas / Santa Claus
- Sarah Polley as Molly Monaghan
- Graham Jarvis as Frank Crump
- Timothy Webber as Herbie Conklin
- Joy Thompson as Mrs. Monaghan
- John Friesen as Mr. Noonan
- Debra McGrath as Mrs. Noonan

== Production ==
The idea for the picture originated in 1976 when director Phillip Borsos wrote a one-page story idea. He later co-wrote a first draft with Barry Healey, but the script was reportedly turned down by every Hollywood studio, although his efforts secured the commitments of actress Mary Steenburgen, and producer Fred Roos. The film was initially announced under the title of Father Christmas with Richard Farnsworth slated to star in the role of Gideon reteaming him with Borsos after the two had previously collaborated on 1982's The Grey Fox. Although the film was slated to begin shooting in December 1983, the film was delayed due to financing problems resulting in the film's budget being scaled back from $9 million to $7.5 million. In February 1985, it was announced Walt Disney Pictures had come on board as a producer following Orion Pictures dropping out, and Disney would supply two-thirds of the budget (approximately $5.5 million) while Telefilm Canada’s Broadcast Fund would supply the remaining one-third. The following March it was announced that Harry Dean Stanton would be assuming the role of Gideon originally intended for Farnsworth. 300 locals served as background actors for a shopping mall scene, filmed in Feb 1985, and fifty shopkeepers agreed to replace their Valentine’s Day decorations with Christmas decorations for the scene. Additionally, residents on a street in the Toronto suburb of Scarborough decorated their homes with Christmas lights for the production. Snow had to be brought in by trucks, following an unseasonable thaw. Reportedly, five tons of snow were brought in from surrounding areas in more than 100 dump truck loads over a four-day period. Ironically, a blizzard blew in days later, and crew members had to remove the excess snow. Sleet, rain, fog, mud, and wind gusts up to fifty miles per hour made filming a challenge. The Toronto post office supplied 20,000 actual letters to Santa Claus for the scene at Santa’s workshop.

Prior to release, the film's title was changed to One Night Before Christmas before producers settle on One Magic Christmas for the final re-title. It initially received a PG rating from the MPAA, but switched to G after a successful appeal.

== Release ==
The film was theatrically released in Canada and the United States on November 22, 1985. It opened in Brazil on December 18, 1985, and in Australia the following year, on November 27, 1986. It was released in Uruguay on December 12, 1986, through VHS (Montevideo), and in Japan the following year, on November 25, 1987, on VHS.

It was released on DVD in the United States (Region 1) on August 21, 2001.

On December 4, 2012, Netflix released the DVD and later made it available to stream in the United States, France, and the Netherlands.

== Box office ==
One Magic Christmas grossed $2,662,241 in its opening weekend from 824 screens in the United States and Canada, placing second behind fellow opener King Solomon's Mines. It grossed a total of $13,677,222 in the United States and Canada.

== Critical response ==
One Magic Christmas has a 47% score on Rotten Tomatoes from 17 critics.

Roger Ebert gave the film two stars out of four, saying, "This is very unfortunate. What we have here is a movie with an intelligent screenplay, wonderful performances and skillful direction, but it is a tactical miscalculation from beginning to end", lamenting the misguided "sad, sad story."

Janet Maslin of The New York Times called the film "modern[,] with a gratifyingly old-fashioned feeling, some of which is a matter of its unself-conscious plainness".

== See also ==
- List of films about angels
- List of Christmas films
- Santa Claus in film
