= Nice Girls Don't Explode =

- Theatrical release poster
- Directed by: Chuck Martinez
- Written by: Paul Harris
- Produced by: Douglas Curtis
- Starring: Barbara Harris; Michelle Meyrink; William O'Leary; Wallace Shawn; James Nardini
- Cinematography: Stephen M. Katz
- Edited by: Wende Phifer Mate
- Music by: Brian Banks; Anthony Marinelli
- Distributed by: New World Pictures
- Release date: April 3, 1987
- Running time: 92 minutes
- Country: United States
- Language: English
- Box office: $$65,000

Nice Girls Don't Explode is a 1987 American independent comedy film produced by Douglas Curtis, directed by Chuck Martinez, and starring Barbara Harris, Michelle Meyrink, William O'Leary, Wallace Shawn, and James Nardini. The film was released by New World Pictures.

== Plot ==
April Flowers (Michelle Meyrink) is kept away from boys by her overprotective mother (Barbara Harris) because flames have a tendency to spontaneously erupt whenever her hormones are aroused; for April, "protection" on a dinner date is carrying a fire extinguisher. As her mother explains, April is a "fire girl," whose very unstable body chemistry causes spontaneous combustion when she is aroused. As such, the only men April meets more than once are firefighters.

When April reconnects with Andy (William O'Leary), a former neighbor who has returned to April's life, he challenges April's and her mother's assumption and presses his luck to prove to her that her hormones are not, in fact, explosive. Hijinks result; as Andy tries to prove his point, he is thwarted at every turn by April's mother. Further complications ensue when April befriends a lonely, obsessive pyromaniac named "Ellen" (Wallace Shawn), who becomes incensed at the constant mishearing of his real name "Ellen" for "Helen," after which he throws Bic lighter flicking snits, trying to set his tormentors ablaze.

== Cast ==
- Barbara Harris as Mom
- Michelle Meyrink as April Flowers
  - Margot Gray as Little April Flowers
- William O'Leary as Andy
  - Jonas Baughman as Little Andy
- Wallace Shawn as Ellen
- James Nardini as Ken
- Belinda Wells as Girl In Park
- Irwin Keyes as Cocker
- William Kuhlke as Dr. Stewart
- Johnnie 'Mac' McHaynes as Nick
- Zachery 'Zach' Carey as Rudy
- Holmes Osborne as Dick
- Peggy Freisen as Tracy
- Richard Kawecki as Guard 1
- Daryl Champine as Guard 2
- Eleanor Joy Lind as Nurse
- Brent Wright as Eugene
- Rick L. Stevens as Todd
- Jack Wright as Maitre’d
- Jean E. Crupper as Aerobics Instructor
- Michelle A. Austin as Girl in Aerobics Class
- Jess Paul, Jr. as Chineses Ping Pong Champ
- Paul Stephen Lim as Chinese Dad
- Orange Cat #5 as Fluffy
- Eric the Cat as Fluffy Stunt Double

== Production ==
Part of the film was shot in the cities of Lawrence, Kansas, Ottawa, Kansas, and Overland Park, Kansas.

== Box office ==
Nice Girls Don't Explode had a domestic box-office total of only $65,000.
