= Our Kind of People =

2021 American drama television series

- Genre: Drama
- Created by: Karin Gist and Wendy Calhoun
- Inspired by: Our Kind of People: Inside America's Black Upper Class by Lawrence Otis Graham
- Starring: Yaya DaCosta; Nadine Ellis; Lance Gross; Rhyon Nicole Brown; Alana Bright; Kyle Bary; Joe Morton; Morris Chestnut
- Opening theme: Antonio Chaulet
- Composer: Meshell Ndegeocello
- Country of origin: United States
- Original language: English
- No. of seasons: 1
- No. of episodes: 12

Production
- Executive producers: Aaron Harberts & Gretchen Berg; Tasha Smith; Ben Silverman & Rodney Ferrell; Montrel McKay; Lee Daniels; Marc Velez; Pamela Oas Williams; Karin Gist; Claire Brown
- Producers: Michael Gray; Lawrence Otis Graham; Jahil Fisher
- Cinematography: Timothy Burton
- Editors: Jacques Gravett; Tamara Luciano; Sarah E. Williams
- Camera setup: Single-camera
- Production companies: Lee Daniels Entertainment; Electus; The Gist of It Productions; Fox Entertainment; 20th Television

Original release
- Network: Fox
- Release: September 21, 2021 – January 25, 2022

Our Kind of People is an American drama television series that premiered on Fox on September 21, 2021, as a fall entry during the 2021–22 television season. The series, created by Karin Gist and Wendy Calhoun, is inspired by the 1999 book of the same name by Lawrence Otis Graham. The final episode aired on January 25, 2022; in May 2022, the series was cancelled after one season.

== Premise ==
Set in Oak Bluffs, Massachusetts, the series follows the rich and powerful Black elites as they come to play and summer as they did for over 5 decades. However, this summer, Angela Vaughn, a strong-willed single mother, sets out to regain her family's name after it was damaged by rumors and a shocking revelation, while simultaneously attempting to make an impact with her groundbreaking hair care line that accentuates the underlying natural beauty of Black women, but she soon discovers a dark secret about her own mother's history that will turn her world upside down and shake up this community forever.

== Cast and characters ==
=== Main ===
- Yaya DaCosta as Angela Vaughn
- Nadine Ellis as Leah Franklin Dupont
- Lance Gross as Tyrique Chapman
- Rhyon Nicole Brown as Lauren Dupont
- Alana Bright as Nikki Vaughn
- Kyle Bary as Quincy Dupont
- Joe Morton as Teddy Franklin
- Morris Chestnut as Raymond Dupont

=== Recurring ===
- Raven Goodwin as Josephine
- Nicole Chanel Williams as Taylor Woods
- L. Scott Caldwell as Olivia Sturgess Dupont
- Debbi Morgan as Patricia “Aunt Piggy” Williams
- Melissa De Sousa as Alex Rivera
- McKinley Freeman as Nate Robinson
- Ashley Nicole Blake as Young Eve
- Susan Spain as Rose Franklin, Teddy's wife and Leah's mother.
- Kay-Megan Washington as Jackie, Franklin family maid
- Ahmarie Holmes as Sloane, Jackie’s granddaughter who is secretly seeing Quincy
- Jeff Hephner as Jack Harmon, Raymond’s partner at Darmon

== Episodes ==
No.	Title	Directed by	Written by	Original release date	Prod. code	U.S viewers (millions)
1	"Reparations"	Tasha Smith	Karin Gist	September 21, 2021	1HLT01	1.65
2	"My Mother, Myself"	Tasha Smith	Karin Gist	September 28, 2021	1HLT02	1.49
3	"Hot Links & Red Drinks"	Jeff Byrd	Bryan M. Holdman	October 5, 2021	1HLT03	1.43
4	"Crabs in a Gold-Plated Barrel"	Princess Monique Filmz	Rebecca Boss & Chris Masi	October 12, 2021	1HLT04	1.38
5	"The Miseducation of the Negro"	Julie Dash	Nambi E. Kelley & Lauren Goodman	October 19, 2021	1HLT05	1.42
6	"For Colored Boys..."	Jeff Byrd	Story by : Norman Vance Jr. Teleplay by : Bryan M. Holdman	November 9, 2021	1HLT06	1.36
7	"Fathers, Daughters, Sisters"	Joe Morton	Norman Vance Jr.	November 16, 2021	1HLT07	1.30
8	"Sistervention..."	Keesha Sharp	Rebecca Boss & Chris Masi	November 30, 2021	1HLT08	1.42
9	"Twice as Hard, Twice as Good"	Benny Boom	Antonia French March & Jacqueline McKinley	December 7, 2021	1HLT09	1.14
10	"Just Desserts"	Mary Lou Belli	Bryan M. Holdman	January 11, 2022	1HLT10	1.13
11	"It Is Not Light We Need, but Fire"	Jeff Byrd	Karin Gist & Gretchen J. Berg & Aaron Harberts	January 18, 2022	1HLT11	1.14
12	"Kiss It Up to God"	Jeff Byrd	Karin Gist & Gretchen J. Berg & Aaron Harberts	January 25, 2022	1HLT12	1.34

== Production ==
=== Development ===
In September 2017, it was announced that an adaptation of Lawrence Otis Graham's 1999 book Our Kind of People: Inside America's Black Upper Class, pitched by Wendy Calhoun was in development at Fox. In August 2019, writing on the series was taken over by Lee Daniels and Karen Gist. The outbreak of the COVID-19 pandemic in March 2020 resulted in the series being pushed to off-cycle development. In September 2020, it was confirmed that a writer's room had been opened for the series and that the series was in contention for a straight-to-series order for the 2021–22 season. On March 29, 2021, the project was officially handed a series order by Fox. The opening theme for the series, "Our Kind of People," is performed by independent recording artist Tinashe. On May 13, 2022, Fox canceled the series after one season.

=== Casting ===
On May 12, 2021, Yaya DaCosta was the first to be cast in the series, in the role of Angela Vaughn. She was joined the following week by Morris Chestnut, in the role of Raymond Dupont. At the end of May 2021, Alana Bright was cast in a starring role. In June 2021, LeToya Luckett, Rhyon Nicole Brown, Joe Morton, Kyle Bary, and Lance Gross were cast in a starring roles while Debbi Morgan and L. Scott Caldwell were cast in recurring roles. In July 2021, Nadine Ellis joined the cast in a recasting, replacing Luckett. In August 2021, Raven Goodwin and Nicole Chanel Williams were cast in recurring roles. In October 2021, Melissa De Sousa and McKinley Freeman joined the cast in recurring capacities.

=== Filming ===
Principal photography for the series began on July 7, 2021, and concluded on November 24, 2021, in Wilmington, North Carolina.

== Release ==
The series premiered on September 21, 2021, as a Tuesday night entry at 9 p.m. on Fox after the hit drama The Resident. On July 27, 2021, Fox released the first official teaser for the series.

=== International ===
In Canada, the series airs on CTV in a simulcast with Fox. It has been dumped to CTV 2 after 2 episodes due to low ratings. The series also premiered with the first 3 episodes on Disney+ via the streaming hub Star as an original series in selected countries. In Latin America, the series premiered as a Star+ original. In India, the series streams on Disney+ Hotstar, with episodes being made available the day after their U.S. broadcast. Due to budget cuts, the show was removed from all Disney streaming platforms on October 3, 2022, alongside other original Star shows.

== Reception ==
=== Critical response ===
The review aggregator website Rotten Tomatoes reports a 33% approval rating with an average rating of 6.1/10, based on 12 critic reviews. The website's critics consensus reads, "Our Kind of People has its share of soapy seductions, but overly familiar plots and a general lack of tension strand an attractive cast in a beautifully empty drama." Metacritic, which uses a weighted average, assigned a score of 53 out of 100 based on 11 critics, indicating "mixed or average reviews".

=== Ratings ===
Viewership and ratings per episode of Our Kind of People
No.	Title	Air date	Rating (18–49)	Viewers (millions)	DVR (18–49)	DVR viewers (millions)	Total (18–49)	Total viewers (millions)
1	"Reparations"	September 21, 2021	0.4	1.65	—N/a	—N/a	—N/a	—N/a
2	"My Mother, Myself"	September 28, 2021	0.3	1.49	—N/a	—N/a	—N/a	—N/a
3	"Hot Links & Red Drinks"	October 5, 2021	0.3	1.43	—N/a	—N/a	—N/a	—N/a
4	"Crabs in a Gold-Plated Barrel"	October 12, 2021	0.3	1.38	0.2	0.68	0.5	2.07
5	"The Miseducation of the Negro"	October 19, 2021	0.3	1.42	0.2	0.74	0.5	2.15
6	"For Colored Boys..."	November 9, 2021	0.4	1.36	—N/a	—N/a	—N/a	—N/a
7	"Fathers, Daughters, Sisters"	November 16, 2021	0.3	1.30	0.1	0.56	0.4	1.85
8	"Sistervention..."	November 30, 2021	0.3	1.42	0.2	0.72	0.6	2.14
9	"Twice as Hard, Twice as Good"	December 7, 2021	0.2	1.14	0.2	0.60	0.4	1.74
10	"Just Desserts"	January 11, 2022	0.3	1.13	—N/a	—N/a	—N/a	—N/a
11	"It Is Not Light We Need, but Fire"	January 18, 2022	0.2	1.14	—N/a	—N/a	—N/a	—N/a
12	"Kiss It Up to God"	January 25, 2022	0.3	1.34	—N/a	—N/a	—N/a	—N/a
