= Nadine Ellis =

American actress

- Born: April 15, 1971 (age 55); Queens, New York, U.S.
- Occupations: Actress, Dancer
- Years active: 2000–present

Nadine Ellis (born April 15, 1971) is an American actress and dancer. She starred as Stacy Lawrence, the leading character in the BET romantic comedy series, Let's Stay Together (2011–2014). Ellis also has appeared in more than 80 television shows and feature films, and notably had regular roles in the Netflix teen drama Greenhouse Academy (2017–18), and Fox drama series, Our Kind of People (2021–22).

== Life and career ==
Ellis was born and raised in Queens, New York. She graduated from Fiorello H. LaGuardia High School and later attended New York Institute of Technology. Ellis later moved to Los Angeles for acting career and began appearing in episodes of television shows such as Any Day Now, Men, Women & Dogs, Nikki and V.I.P.. Ellis also was a member of a dance group The Pussycat Dolls. She also played dancers in films Nutty Professor II: The Klumps (2000), Charlie's Angels: Full Throttle (2003), Gigli (2003), Starsky & Hutch (2004), 13 Going on 30 (2004), Guess Who (2005), Idlewild (2006), Hairspray (2007), 500 Days of Summer (2009), and Iron Man 2 (2010). From 2004 to 2008, Ellis had a recurring role in the Comedy Central comedy series, Reno 911!.

In 2011, Ellis was cast in the leading role of Stacy Lawrence in the BET romantic comedy series, Let's Stay Together. The series was cancelled after four seasons in 2014. Ellis later had starring roles in a number of made-for-television movies, include Somebody's Child (2012), Four of Hearts (2013), and Love the One You're With (2014), as well guest-starred on Bones, Timeless, Training Day, Lucifer and Jane the Virgin. She starred in the 2017 comedy film Another Man Will directed by David E. Talbert, and appeared in the comedy film Daphne & Velma (2018). From 2017 to 2018 she starred as Judy Hayward in the Netflix teen drama series, Greenhouse Academy. From 2019 to 2020, Ellis had a recurring role as Brenda Williams in the Showtime comedy-drama series, Shameless.

In 2021, Ellis was cast as Leah Franklin Dupont in the Fox prime time soap opera, Our Kind of People, replacing LeToya Luckett who had been originally cast in the role. The series was cancelled after one season in 2022. She later starred in the Holiday movies Christmas for Sale (2021), The Christmas Clapback (2022), and The Holiday Stocking (2022).

== Filmography ==
=== Film ===
Year	Title	Role	Notes
2000	Nutty Professor II: The Klumps	Dancer	
2002	The Hot Chick	Palace Girl	
2003	Charlie's Angels: Full Throttle	Treasure Chest Dancer	
2003	Gigli	Beach Dancer	
2004	Starsky & Hutch	Nightclub Dancer	
2004	13 Going on 30	Dancer	
2005	Guess Who	Dancer	
2006	Idlewild	Church Dancer	
2007	Live Free or Die Hard	Teller	
2007	Hairspray	Dynamites	
2008	Tropic Thunder	Speedman Assistant	
2008	An American Carol	Parent	
2008	A Muppets Christmas: Letters to Santa	Dancer	TV movie
2009	500 Days of Summer	Dancer	
2010	Iron Man 2	Ironette Dancer	
2011	He's Mine Not Yours	Danielle	
2011	GayCare	Tammy Chowsky	Short
2012	The Coalition	Kennedy Lorenze	Video
2012	Somebody's Child	Hope	TV movie
2013	Four of Hearts	April	
2014	Love the One You're With	Diana	TV movie
2015	Fear Files	Bianca Wayne	TV movie
2016	9 Rides	Uber Pool Woman	
2016	Timeless: Continuum Recon	NASA Mathematician	Short
2017	Another Man Will	Cynthia Scott	
2017	Can't Buy My Love	Dr. Richwood	TV movie
2017	Like a Racehorse	-	Short
2018	Daphne & Velma	Elizabeth Blake	
2018	Love Just Is	Sheryl Jackson	Short
2019	Back to the Goode Life	Kandi	
2020	Influence	Teresa Graham	
2020	The Aerialist	Bianca	
2021	Christmas for Sale	Farrah Hightower	TV movie
2022	The Christmas Clapback	Kira	
2022	The Holiday Stocking	Dani Holiday	TV movie
2024	It Takes A Village	Ophelia Cooke	Short

=== Television ===
Year	Legacy	Role	Notes
2000	Any Day Now	-	Episode: "It's a Mother-Daughter Thing"
2001	Men, Women & Dogs	Gail	Episode: "Old Dogs, New Tricks"
2001	Nikki	Dancer	Episode: "Superhero Blues" & "Milli Vanikki"
2002	V.I.P.	Chandra	Episode: "Saving Private Irons"
2003	American Dreams	Vandella #2	Episode: "Life's Illusions"
2004	The Practice	Officer Annie Carroll	Episode: "Police State"
2004	Cold Case	Blanche (1939)	Episode: "The Letter"
2004	ER	Mason's Wife	Episode: "Where There's Smoke"
2004-08	Reno 911!	Nurse	Recurring Cast: Season 2 & 5, Guest: Season 4
2005	24	Mary	Recurring Cast: Season 4
2006	Las Vegas	Dealer	Episode: "Fidelity, Security, Delivery"
2007	Everybody Hates Chris	Mrs. Booker	Episode: "Everybody Hates Snow Day"
2007	Two and a Half Men	Jeanie	Episode: "Mr. McGlue's Feedbag"
2007	Exes & Ohs	Einstein	Episode: "There Must Be Rules..."
2007	Boston Legal	Singer #3	Episode: "Green Christmas"
2009	Lie to Me	Female Secret Service Agent	Episode: "Love Always"
2010	How I Met Your Mother	Lady Cop	Episode: "Girls Versus Suits"
2010	FlashForward	Angie Tremont	Episode: "Course Correction"
2011-14	Let's Stay Together	Stacy Lawrence-Whitmore	Main Cast
2012	Bones	Dr. Alyson Noble	Episode: "The Past in the Present"
2013	Touch	Coroner	Episode: "Fight or Flight"
2016	Timeless	Katherine Johnson	Episode: "Space Race"
2017	Training Day	Regina Finney	Episode: "Quid Pro Quo"
2017-18	Greenhouse Academy	Judy Hayward	Main Cast: Season 1-2
2017-19	Jane the Virgin	Jane's Therapist	Guest Cast: Season 3 & 5
2019	NCIS: New Orleans	Survivors for Peace Leader	Episode: "Chaos Theory"
2019	The Affair	Amy	Episode: "508"
2019	NCIS: Los Angeles	Lieutenant Commander Quinn	Guest Cast: Season 10-11
2019	Solve: The Podcast	Barbara	Episode: "Till Death Do Us Part"
2019-20	Shameless	Brenda Williams	Recurring Cast: Season 10
2020	Stuck with You	Lacey	Episode: "Beware of the Ex"
2021	Country Comfort	Georgina	Recurring Cast
2021	All American	Ms. Sims	Episode: "All American: Homecoming"
2021-22	Our Kind of People	Leah Franklin-Dupont	Main Cast
2024	Quantum Leap	Connie Davis	Episode: "The Outsider"
2024	Bel-Air	Annie Alton	Recurring Cast: Season 3

=== Music videos ===
Year	Song	Artist	Role
2001	"Rock the Boat"	Aaliyah	Dancer
2018	"Bender"	Verbal + Icarus	Reveler
