= Nicki Micheaux =

American actress (born 1971)

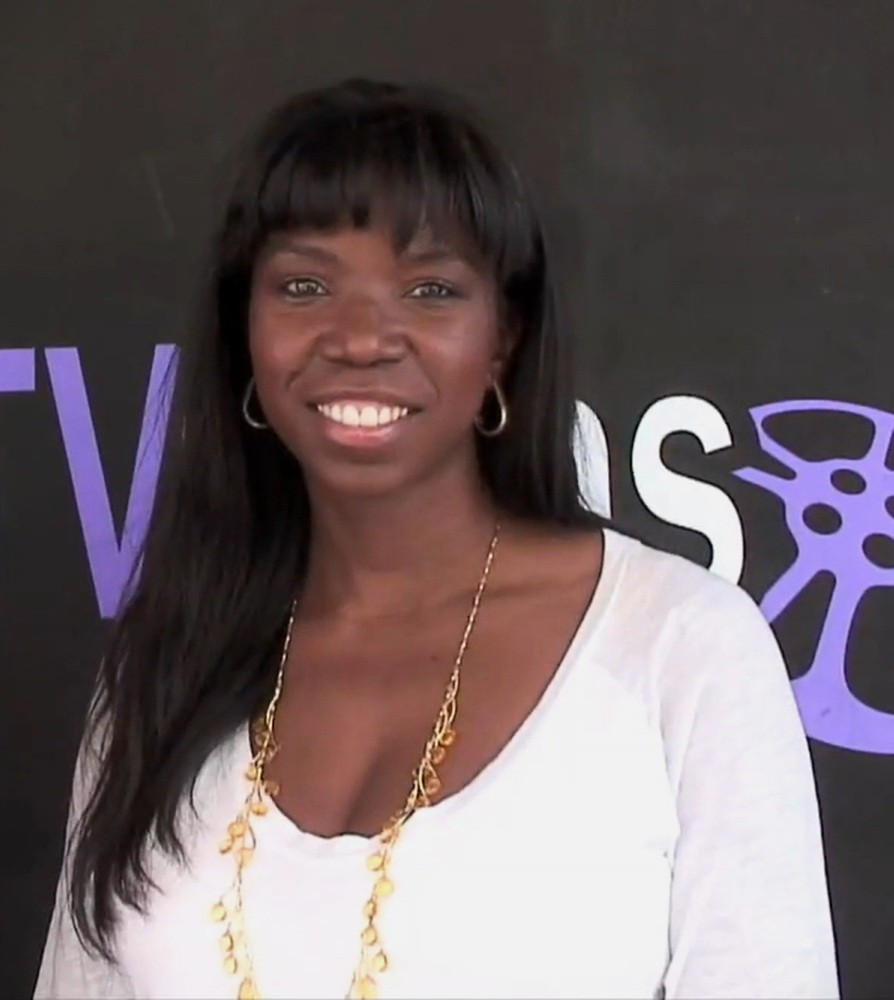
- Micheaux in 2009
- Born: Detroit, Michigan, U.S.
- Occupation: Actress
- Years active: 1996–present

Nicki Micheaux is an American actress, known for her role as Jennifer 'Jenn' Sutton in the ABC Family drama series Lincoln Heights (2007–2009), for which she received two NAACP Image Award for Outstanding Actress in a Drama Series nominations.

== Early life ==
Micheaux was born in Detroit, Michigan, the daughter of a United States Army officer. She attended the University of Colorado Boulder where she enrolled in an acting class because she thought it would be easy. She found that, when acting, her endorphins would be "through the roof" and it would take her days to come down. Although CU Boulder did not stage many "black plays," she benefited from race-blind casting and, for example, was cast as a co-lead in Come Back to the 5 & Dime, Jimmy Dean, Jimmy Dean.

== Career ==
Micheaux began her career appearing in supporting film roles and playing guest-starring parts on television shows include ER, Any Day Now and City of Angels. From 2001 to 2002, she had the recurring role on the Showtime drama series Soul Food. She later had the recurring roles on HBO drama Six Feet Under as Karla Charles and FX crime drama The Shield as Trish George. In film, Micheaux has appeared in Sweet Jane, Ringmaster (1998), The Trials of Cate McCall (2013) and The Pact 2 (2014). She also co-starred opposite Halle Berry in the 2005 television film Their Eyes Were Watching God.

From 2007 to 2009, Micheaux played Jennifer 'Jenn' Sutton in the ABC Family drama series Lincoln Heights. She received two NAACP Image Award for Outstanding Actress in a Drama Series nominations for her role on series. She also guest-starred on Brothers & Sisters, Castle and The Mentalist. In 2016, Micheaux was cast in a recurring role in the TNT drama series Animal Kingdom playing detective Sandra Yates. She later had a recurring role in Colony, S.W.A.T., Good Trouble, Shameless and In the Dark. She played the leading role in the 2017 comedy-thriller film, Lowlife receiving positive reviews from critics.

In 2023, Micheaux directed and wrote the period drama film Summer Of Violence.

== Personal life ==
Micheaux is married to a comic book creator, with whom she has two children.

== Filmography ==
=== Film ===
Year	Title	Role	Notes
1996	The Cold Equations	Ground Controller	TV movie
1997	Murder Live!	Young Woman	TV movie
1998	The Replacement Killers	Nicole, Police Technician	
1998	The Prophecy II	Detective Kreibel	Video
1998	Sweet Jane	Martielle	
1998	My Giant	P.A. Jeannie	
1998	Where's Marlowe?	Caroline	
1998	Ringmaster	Leshawnette	
2000	The Audition	Janet	Short
2002	The Trial	Mrs. Howard	
2003	With or Without You	Rochelle	
2004	With It	Cathy LaRocca	Short
2004	The Ranch	Velvet	TV movie
2005	Their Eyes Were Watching God	Phoebe Watson	TV movie
2006	God's Waiting List	Teresa Corbin	
2008	Rain	Glory	
2010	Veil	Bianca Veil	Short
2011	Narcocorrido	Naija	Short
2013	The Trials of Cate McCall	Administrator	
2014	The Pact 2	Lieutenant Eileen Carver	
2016	Forgiveness	Helena Burroughs	Short
2017	Manic	Sierra	Short
2017	Lowlife	Crystal	
2021	Lazarus	Nina Jacobs	
2024	Summer of Violence	—N/a	Completed; director writer and executive producer only
2025	Night Patrol	Ayanda Carr	

=== Television ===
Year	Title	Role	Notes
1997	ER	Mrs. Williamns	Episode: "Ambush"
1998	The Practice	Security Guard Patricia Olah	Episode: "Swearing In"
1998	NYPD Blue	Marva	Episode: "Seminal Thinking"
1999	Pacific Blue	Helen Patois	Episode: "Gaslight"
1999	Any Day Now	-	Episode: "A Parent's Job"
2000	City of Angels	Verlynne	Episode: "Prototype" & "Weenis Between Us"
2000	The Others	Doctor	Episode: "Mora"
2000	Strong Medicine	Lori	Episode: "Performance Anxiety"
2000	Felicity	Al-Anon Leader	Recurring Cast: Season 3
2001	Philly	Shayna	Episode: "Pilot" & "Porn Again"
2001–02	Soul Food	Lila	Guest: Season 1, Recurring Cast: Season 2
2002	The Agency	Dr. Kendis Hunt	Episode: "The Enemy Within"
2002	The District	Irene Baxter	Episode: "Wasteland"
2002	First Monday	Charmaine	Episode: "Court Date"
2002	Six Feet Under	Karla	Recurring Cast: Season 2
2002	The West Wing	Muriel	Episode: "We Killed Yamamoto"
2003	Presidio Med	-	Episode: "Breathless"
2003	Dragnet	Emma Guzman	Episode: "The Silver Slayer" & "Well Endowed"
2003	Robbery Homicide Division	Patrice	Episode: "Hellbound Train"
2003	NYPD Blue	Andrea Miner	Episode: "Shear Stupidity"
2003	JAG	Deputy Sheriff Linda Foyo	Episode: "Posse Comitatus"
2004	The Shield	Trish George	Recurring Cast: Season 3
2005	Desperate Housewives	Detective Schroeder	Episode: "They Asked Me Why I Believe in You"
2006	In Justice	Mara Wainwright	Episode: "Pilot"
2006	Brothers & Sisters	Michele Yearwood	Episode: "Date Night"
2007	Women's Murder Club	Nadia Delashummt	Episode: "No Opportunity Necessary"
2007–09	Lincoln Heights	Jennifer "Jenn" Sutton	Main Cast
2009	Castle	Michelle	Episode: "Always Buy Retail"
2010	Detroit 1-8-7	Brooke Jackson	Episode: "Royal Bubbles/Needle Drop"
2011	Law & Order: LA	Vanessa Hayes	Episode: "El Sereno"
2011	The Mentalist	Detective Miller	Episode: "Scarlet Ribbons"
2011	Prime Suspect	Ms. Castillo	Episode: "Carnivorous Sheep"
2012	Perception	Ellen	Episode: "Nemesis"
2014	Real Husbands of Hollywood	Twinkie	Episode: "Black Is the Same Old Black"
2015	Battle Creek	Marina	Episode: "Sympathy for the Devil"
2016	Animal Kingdom	Detective Sandra Yates	Recurring Cast: Season 1
2017	Veep	Nyaring Ayun	Episode: "Qatar"
2017	NCIS	Detective Naeher	Episode: "Double Down"
2018	Colony	Michelle	Recurring Cast: Season 3
2018–19	S.W.A.T.	Leah Jankins	Guest: Season 1, Recurring Cast: Season 2
2019	Chicago P.D.	Alicia Price	Episode: "Pain Killer" & "What Could Have Been"
2019	Good Trouble	Sandra Thompson	Recurring Cast: Season 1–2
2019	Shameless	Michelle "Shelly" Demeter	Recurring Cast: Season 10
2019–20	In the Dark	Nia Bailey	Recurring Cast: Season 1–2
2021	NCIS: Los Angeles	Special Agent Effie Carlson	Recurring Cast: Season 12
2021	BET Her Presents: The Couch	Miranda	Episode: "Through Her Eyes"
2022	Law & Order: Special Victims Unit	Cora Green	Episode: "Tangled Strands of Justice"
2026	The Drop: A Snowfall Saga		Episode: "Click Pop"

=== Video Game ===
Year	Title	Role
2023	Forspoken	Maya Bird (voice)

== Award nominations ==
Year	Award	Category	Work	Result	Refs
2006	Black Reel Awards	Black Reel Award for Outstanding Supporting Actress, TV Movie or Limited Series	Their Eyes Were Watching God	Nominated	
2008	NAACP Image Awards	NAACP Image Award for Outstanding Actress in a Drama Series	Lincoln Heights	Nominated	
2009	NAACP Image Awards	NAACP Image Award for Outstanding Actress in a Drama Series	Lincoln Heights	Nominated	
2018	FrightFest	FrightFest Jury Award for Best Actress	Lowlife	Nominated	
