= William O'Leary (actor) =

American actor

- Born: October 19, 1957 (age 68); Chicago, Illinois, U.S.
- Education: Illinois State University; University of Washington
- Occupation: Actor
- Years active: 1985–present
- Known for: Home Improvement

William O'Leary (born October 19, 1957) is an American actor. He is best known for playing Marty Taylor on Home Improvement (1994–1999).

== Early life ==
He was born in Chicago, Illinois and started acting at the age of 7. He graduated from Highland Park High School in Highland Park, Illinois, in 1976.

O'Leary received a degree in acting from Illinois State University and in 1982 received an MFA from the University of Washington's Professional Actor Training Program.

== Career ==
O'Leary made his Broadway debut in 1986 alongside Ed Harris and Judith Ivey as Art in Precious Sons at the Longacre Theatre.

He played Marty Taylor, the younger brother of Tim Taylor (Tim Allen), on Home Improvement, and was the primary antagonist, General Xaviax, on Kamen Rider: Dragon Knight.

== Filmography ==
Year	Title	Role	Notes
1987	Nice Girls Don't Explode	Andy	
1987	Walker	James Walker	
1988	Bull Durham	Jimmy	
1988	Miami Vice	Scotty	Episode: "Bad Timing"
1989	Lost Angels	Link	Matlock Season 4 Episode 5 Newspaper Journalist "Paul"
1991	Flight of Black Angel	Capt. Eddie Gordon, Callsign Black Angel	
1991	Hot Shots!	Lieutenant Pete 'Dead Meat' Thompson	
1991–1992	Dear John	Ben	22 episodes
1993	In the Line of Duty: Ambush in Waco	Adrian	
1994–1999	Home Improvement	Martin "Marty" Taylor	30 episodes
1994	The Enemy Within	Lt. William Dorsett	
1995–1996	Murder, She Wrote	FBI Agt. Ed Crider	2 episodes
1996	Candyman: Farewell to the Flesh	Ethan Tarrant	
1996	Project ALF	Capt. Rick Mullican	
1997	Mad City	CTN Junior Executive #1	
1997	A Time to Revenge	Lyle Whittmar	
2000	Daybreak	Head of Security	
2000	The X-Files	Man at Gas Station	Episode: "Roadrunners"
2002–2003	CSI: Miami	Stewart Otis	2 episodes: "Broken" & "Body Count"
2003	Terminator 3: Rise of the Machines	Mr. Smith	
2005	The West Wing	Fish & Wildlife Rep	Episode: "A Good Day"
2005	Miss Congeniality 2: Armed and Fabulous	Agent Jenkins	
2005	NUMB3RS	Roland Haldane	Pilot episode
2007	Moola	Mickey Fish	
2008	Soccer Mom	Harley the Tournament Director	
2009	Kamen Rider: Dragon Knight	Xaviax	Recurring cast
2009	24	Sid Paulson	2 episodes
2011	In My Pocket	Mr. Jameson	
2016	Is That a Gun in Your Pocket?	Sam Graves	
