= Shameless season 6 =

Shameless
- Season 6
- DVD cover
- Showrunner: John Wells
- Starring: William H. Macy; Emmy Rossum; Jeremy Allen White; Ethan Cutkosky; Shanola Hampton; Steve Howey; Emma Kenney; Cameron Monaghan
- No. of episodes: 12

Release
- Original network: Showtime
- Original release: January 10 – April 3, 2016

Season chronology
- ← Previous; Season 5 Next → Season 7

The sixth season of Shameless, an American comedy-drama television series based on the British series of the same name by Paul Abbott, premiered on January 10, 2016 and concluded on April 3, 2016. Executive producers are John Wells, Andrew Stearn, Nancy M. Pimental, Davey Holmes, Christopher Chulack, Krista Vernoff and producers Terri Murphy and Princess Nash.

== Plot ==
Fiona struggles with work at Patsy's Pies after being promoted to assistant manager. Though she is still married to Gus, Fiona has begun a sexual relationship with Sean. When Fiona unexpectedly finds out she is pregnant (and does not know who the father is), she ultimately decides to get an abortion.

Carl gets an early release from juvie and begins acting on a tough persona, selling weapons in school and continuing to work in the drug business. In the process, Carl begins dating a classmate, Dominique, whom he loses his virginity to. When Carl witnesses his friend, Nick, killing a neighborhood boy over a stolen bike, Carl decides he no longer wants to pursue a criminal lifestyle and confides in Fiona. Meanwhile, Debbie has decided to keep her baby, but Derek, not ready to become a father, abandons her. When Fiona refuses to support Debbie through her pregnancy, Debbie gets assistance from Frank, who has been mourning the loss of Bianca. When Sammi's mother, Queenie, comes into town following Chuckie's release from juvie, Debbie and Frank briefly travel with Queenie to her family's rural commune, where they grow opium poppies.

Lip continues his relationship with his professor, Helene, but Amanda exacts revenge by exposing a naked picture of Helene in Lip's dorm that goes viral. Lip simultaneously loses his dorm and job, and Helene promises to break off all contact with Lip at a disciplinary hearing. With Lip's drinking habits worsening, he befriends Professor Youens, who acts as Lip's mentor. Lip's descent into alcoholism gets him expelled from college for assaulting a campus guard; Youens convinces Lip to attend Alcoholics Anonymous meetings. Ian puts his relationship with Mickey behind him and begins dating a firefighter, Caleb. With Caleb's encouragement, Ian begins working towards become a firefighter and he lands an EMT job at the end of the season. With Mickey in prison, Svetlana, who has begun working at the Alibi, faces deportation. In order to stay in the United States, Svetlana divorces Mickey and marries Veronica. In the process, Kevin, Veronica, and Svetlana begin a polyamorous relationship.

Fiona faces even more problems when the Gallaghers are given an eviction notice on their house. The house is bid for auction, but the family loses the bid and are forced to move out. Fiona briefly moves in with Sean and attempts to connect with his young son, Will. When the people who initially bought the house rescind the bid, Fiona attempts to get Gus to sign a sheet that recognizes his lack of property claim. But Gus refuses, resentful of Fiona for her past infidelity, and requests for an amicable divorce. At the divorce suit, Sean shows up in front of Gus and his lawyers and proposes to Fiona, who happily accepts. With Carl's help, the Gallaghers are able to reclaim their house, and Sean moves in with Fiona.

As Fiona begins preparing for her wedding, Debbie and Frank return from Queenie's rural commune just in time for Debbie to give birth to a baby girl. To the family's surprise, Debbie names her daughter Frances "Franny" Gallagher, after her father. Days before the wedding, Sean clashes with Frank over his behavior towards his own kids, and he challenges Frank's authority as head of the household. After the two men get into an argument, Frank vows for revenge against Sean; he sneaks into Sean's office and discovers that Sean is still shooting heroin, something that is unknown to Fiona.

During Fiona's wedding ceremony, Frank shows up—uninvited—and reveals to the entire congregation about Sean's heroin, devastating Fiona. Will angrily leaves the ceremony. Sean confronts a heartbroken Fiona, admitting that he had been using for months, and tells Fiona to "take care of herself." While Sean leaves to fight for custody of Will, the rest of the family—including Caleb, Svetlana, Kevin, and Veronica—kidnap Frank and angrily throw him into the freezing river. They flee the area, hoping for Frank's death, to guarantee he is out of their lives forever.

== Cast and characters ==
=== Main ===
- William H. Macy as Frank Gallagher
- Emmy Rossum as Fiona Gallagher Pfender
- Jeremy Allen White as Philip "Lip" Gallagher
- Ethan Cutkosky as Carl Gallagher
- Shanola Hampton as Veronica "V" Fisher
- Steve Howey as Kevin "Kev" Ball
- Emma Kenney as Debbie Gallagher
- Cameron Monaghan as Ian Gallagher

=== Special guest stars ===
- Noel Fisher as Mickey Milkovich

=== Special guest ===
- Dermot Mulroney as Sean Pierce
- Sasha Alexander as Helene Runyon Robinson
- Steve Kazee as Gus Pfender
- Sherilyn Fenn as Queenie Slott

=== Recurring ===
- Isidora Goreshter as Svetlana Milkovich
- Michael Patrick McGill as Tommy
- Jim Hoffmaster as Kermit
- Kellen Michael as Chuckie Slott
- Rebecca Metz as Melinda
- Reed Emmons as Will Pierce
- Jenica Bergere as Lisa
- Lee Stark as Lisa
- José Julián as Joaquin
- Alan Rosenberg as Professor Youens
- Will Sasso as Yanis Papadiamantopoulos
- Victor I. Onuigbo as Nick
- Stacie Greenwell as Olga
- Jaylen Barron as Dominique Winslow
- Peter Macon as Sergeant Winslow
- Andrew Asper as Jason
- Ever Carradine as Erika Wexler
- Jeff Pierre as Caleb Daniels
- Brendan and Brandon Sims as Liam Gallagher

=== Guests ===
- Emma Greenwell as Mandy Milkovich
- Vanessa Bell Calloway as Carol Fisher
- Nichole Bloom as Amanda
- Christopher Stills as Chris
- Luca Oriel as Derek Delgado
- Michael Reilly Burke as Theo Wallace
- Brent Jennings as Principal Monroe
- Gabrielle Walsh as Tanya Delgado
- Brent Sexton as Patrick Gallagher
- Tyler Jacob Moore as Tony Markovich
- Oscar Nunez as Rick Encarnacion
- Stephen Rider as G-Dogg
- Chris Brochu as Dylan Robinson
- Michael McMillian as Tyler Wexler
- Jeff Kober as Jupiter
- Deirdre Lovejoy as Rita

== Episodes ==
No. overall	No. in season	Title	Directed by	Written by	Original release date	US viewers (millions)
61	1	"I Only Miss Her When I'm Breathing"	Christopher Chulack	John Wells	January 1, 2016 (online); January 10, 2016 (Showtime)	1.44
Sammi and Mickey have been arrested for the shootout, the latter for eight years. In prison, Mickey does Russian mafia hits for cash from Svetlana. Ian and Svetlana visit Mickey in prison; Ian tells Mickey that he will wait for him. Frank grieves for Bianca's death and searches for answers from every religion he can think of as to why Bianca was taken from him. Sean and Fiona flirt at Patsy's. When the assistant manager of Patsy's is arrested for drugs, Sean offers Fiona the position of assistant manager. Carl is released from juvie with a new street refined persona and a sidekick, Nick. Lip continues his complicated relationship with Helene and works as a teaching assistant for Professor Youens, a drunk but highly decorated teacher. Kevin and Veronica deal with a loud and homophobic neighbor, Yanis. Fiona takes Debbie to Planned Parenthood to confirm her pregnancy. Returning from the appointment, Debbie initially lies to Fiona about not being pregnant, only for it to come back and bite her when Derek abruptly moves to Florida.
62	2	"#AbortionRules"	Iain B. MacDonald	Nancy M. Pimental	January 17, 2016	1.64
Fiona is intent on getting an abortion for Debbie, who begins carrying a bag of flour around all day to prove that she can handle being a teen mother. However, Debbie learns that people aren't as accommodating to teen mothers as she had hoped. After being voted the "Best Shittiest Bar on the South Side", the Alibi gets infiltrated with hipsters, which Kevin and Svetlana take advantage of. Carl fully embraces the life of a criminal, including selling guns to his classmates at school. After being scolded for arriving late, Ian angrily quits his job at Patsy's. Frank continues his search for closure on Bianca's death and is confronted by Bianca's friend, who claims that Bianca only pursued him because she was dying. Professor Youens offers Lip an internship. Annoyed by Yanis's loud motorcycle, Kevin attempts to cut the motorcycle's throttle cable. He accidentally cuts the brake line instead, resulting in Yanis getting hit by a car. Fiona learns that she is pregnant after a drug test, and she does not know who the father is.
63	3	"The F Word"	Nisha Ganatra	Krista Vernoff	January 24, 2016	1.70
Fiona reveals her pregnancy to Debbie and makes an appointment so both of them can get an abortion, but Debbie furiously refuses. Debbie gains unexpected support from Frank, who encourages her to keep the baby. After Debbie tries to stage an intervention for Fiona to convince her not to abort, Fiona makes it clear that she will refuse to help Debbie if she keeps the baby. Carl becomes interested in his classmate, Dominique, and has begun selling guns to his teachers and principal. Lip lands Ian a janitor job at the university, but Ian is displeased to see that Lip is thriving at college. After getting into a fight with Lip, Ian walks the street and witnesses a hit-and-run; he passes out from smoke inhalation while trying to help the victim, and he is saved by a group of firefighters. Kevin and Veronica visit Yanis and discover he is paralyzed from the waist down. Fiona decides to reach out to Gus at his band's concert. The reunion initially appears to go well, until Gus sings an original song entitled "The F Word" where he publicly bashes Fiona. The Gallaghers are given an eviction notice on the house.
64	4	"Going Once, Going Twice"	Christopher Chulack	Davey Holmes	January 31, 2016	1.70
Patrick refuses to lend a helping hand to his extended family, sending the Gallagher home up for public auction. Kevin admits to cutting the brake cable to Yanis who, in an attempt to get revenge, accidentally lights himself on fire. The Alibi experiences financial woes, and Veronica discovers that their hipster patrons have moved on. Ian visits the local firehouse to thank the firefighters who saved him, and he ends up exchanging a conversation with Caleb. Frank tries to set Debbie up with terminally ill men to take advantage of their wealth, but she rejects all of his options. Debbie ends up becoming a nanny for the Wexler family, whose mother Erika is dying; Debbie hopes to find financial support in Mr. Wexler once Erika dies. Lip spends the weekend with Helene at an academic conference to promote her new book. Chuckie is released from juvie, and is ordered to stay with the Gallaghers due to Sammi's incarceration. Fiona tries to secure the needed funds for the public auction, refusing Carl's drug money in the process. After the family musters what they believe to be enough money, the Gallagher house ends up getting sold to the highest bidder—it is not a Gallagher.
65	5	"Refugees"	Wendey Stanzler	Etan Frankel	February 7, 2016	1.16
The Gallaghers are displaced from their home by the police, with each landing in different places: Carl and Nick stay with Kevin and Veronica, while also trying to find the person who stole Nick's bicycle; Debbie is able to convince Mr. Wexler to let her stay in the guest bedroom; Fiona and Liam move into Sean's apartment as Sean prepares for Will's visit; Chuckie is forgotten about by the Gallaghers and has no place to live. At the Wexler house, Erika makes a move on Debbie. Feeling guilty for Yanis' violent passing, Kevin hastily agrees to foster Asian child soldiers. Veronica is initially chagrined, but eventually bonds with one of the female soldiers. Amanda exacts revenge against Lip by sharing a photo of a naked Helene in Lip's dorm. The photo circulates across campus, and Lip is informed that Helene is facing disciplinary action. Ian attends a fireman/policeman fundraiser and flirts with Caleb; they agree to go on a date.
66	6	"NSFW"	Jake Schreier	Sheila Callaghan	February 14, 2016	1.60
Lip deals with the fallout of the leaked photo, which has gone viral online. At a disciplinary hearing, Helene formally apologizes and agrees to end the relationship, to Lip's dismay, while Amanda decides to leave campus until the situation boils over. The Alibi undergoes another unforeseen hipster influx. Ian and Caleb go on a date. Erika discovers she is in remission; Frank encourages Debbie to pursue Erika so she can continue to stay with the Wexlers. Fiona has her abortion. Frank bonds with Chuckie, who has set up camp outside the Gallagher home. Frank reunites with Sammi's mother, Queenie, who has arrived to claim Chuckie. Carl is distraught when he discovers Nick having murdered a young boy who stole his bike. The couple who had bought the Gallagher home rescind their bid due to the house's poor living conditions, but Fiona must ask Gus to provide his signature to relinquish his right to the house; a resentful Gus refuses to do so. Carl ultimately hands Fiona a large amount of money he had buried, and Fiona uses the money to buy back the house.
67	7	"Pimp's Paradise"	Peter Segal	Dominique Morisseau	February 21, 2016	1.66
Carl transitions the recently reclaimed Gallagher home into his "crib", and Fiona loses her own room in the process. Having no place to sleep, Fiona moves in with Sean. Still shaken by Nick's crimes, Carl offers his condolences to the family of the boy who Nick murdered. After being terminated by the Wexlers, Debbie moves back in with the Gallaghers. Chuckie is reprimanded at school for writing a book report on Mein Kampf, and Frank criticizes the school for trying to censor Chuckie's freedom of speech. Queenie considers moving back to her home village with Chuckie, but decides to stay to help Debbie with her pregnancy. Caleb invites Ian to a family wedding, much to the dismay of Caleb's homophobic father. Kevin and Veronica say goodbye to the refugees as they leave for a new home. Following his break-up with Helene, Lip is evicted from his dorm for vandalism. He ends up getting hired as a houseboy for a sorority house, in which he is provided with a bedroom. A drunk Lip later shows up outside Helene's house to demand an audience, but no one answers.
68	8	"Be a Good Boy. Come For Grandma."	Iain B. MacDonald	Nancy M. Pimental	March 6, 2016	1.50
Distraught over Nick's murder of the young boy, Carl begins to turn away from the criminal lifestyle. When Carl is threatened by his boss, G-Dog, for refusing to do a drug shipment, Frank agrees to do the shipment for Carl; Frank and other partakers end up snorting the drugs instead. Carl opens up to Fiona about the kid's murder, and Sean helps Carl negotiate with G-Dog to end his partnership. Ian and Caleb undergo further relationship bonding; Ian reveals his bipolarity, and Caleb reveals that he is HIV-positive. Debbie briefly bonds with a man named Larry, only to discover that he has a pregnancy fetish. Following his break-up with Helene, Lip experiences a sexual downturn, and is unexpectedly assisted by Queenie, who helps him overcome his sexual dysfunction with reflexology. Fiona sets out to grow closer to Will. At Sean's apartment, Will discovers one of Carl's guns; Sean is enraged over the incident, as he could potentially lose his visitation rights.
69	9	"A Yurt of One's Own"	Ruben Garcia	Davey Holmes	March 13, 2016	1.68
Debbie decides to travel with Queenie and Chuckie to her family's rural commune; Frank decides to join them, as G-Doggg is after him for stealing the drugs. Queenie reveals to Frank that the commune is used to grow opium poppies. Carl loses his virginity to Dominique. Ian reunites with Mandy, who has left Kenyatta and now works as an escort. Ian helps Mandy get rid of the corpse of an abusive client she had strangled, and Mandy spends the night at the Gallagher house before departing the following morning. Svetlana faces possible deportation due to Mickey's incarceration, leading Veronica to suggest that she marry Svetlana to keep her in the United States. Lip continues to struggle with alcohol abuse, and he wakes up in the hospital for alcohol poisoning after passing out on a bench. Gus approaches Fiona to request a divorce, and he asks Fiona to return his grandmother's wedding ring; however, Fiona had already pawned the ring at a pawn shop. Unable to get the ring back, Fiona confides to Sean. Later at the divorce hearing, Sean unexpectedly arrives and returns the ring to Gus. He then proposes to Fiona, to which she happily accepts.
70	10	"Paradise Lost"	Lynn Shelton	Etan Frankel	March 20, 2016	1.60
Professor Youens hires Lip to grade midterm papers, while Lip disputes about his credit in a paper published by Youens. Lip gets fired from his sorority job because of his excessive drinking, and he is ordered to attend counselling or face expulsion. Sean officially moves into the Gallagher home as Fiona begins to make plans for a traditional wedding. Kevin is unhappy about Veronica and Svetlana's plan to marry, and tries to find a way around it. Nevertheless, the girls end up getting married at a courthouse behind Kevin's back. Carl spends an entire day with Dominique's stern cop father. Ian takes an EMT test, but lies about his mental health status. Debbie goes into labor, and she and Frank decide to leave Queenie's commune. Upon returning, Frank is targeted by G-Dog's henchmen; Frank saves himself by claiming he can get them opium, which results in a shootout at Queenie's commune. At the Gallagher house, Debbie gives birth to a baby girl. Much to everyone's surprise, she names her baby Frances, in honor of Frank.
71	11	"Sleep No More"	Anthony Hemingway	Sheila Callaghan	March 27, 2016	1.45
Debbie is exhausted from parenting, but continues to refuse Fiona's help in raising Franny. After accidentally dropping Franny while sleeping, a distraught Debbie realizes she needs to accept Fiona's help. Ian lands a trainee EMT job; he quickly earns the respect of his colleagues, but gets fired after his first day for lying about his bipolar disorder. Kevin and Veronica begin a polyamorous relationship with Svetlana. Lip's college education continues to go downhill as he resorts back to alcohol. When Youens fires Lip from his TA position, Lip angrily smashes Youens' car with a crowbar and is arrested by campus officers. Upon learning of Fiona's engagement, Frank offers to pay for Fiona's wedding reception and goes scamming around town to raise the money, including threatening Derek's family. Sean fears that Frank will end up hurting Fiona and clashes with Frank for putting himself over his family; their difference of opinion quickly descends into a brawl. At the end of the episode, Frank hires a hit man to kill Sean.
72	12	"Familia Supra Gallegorious Omnia!"	Christopher Chulack	John Wells	April 3, 2016	1.63
The Gallaghers prepare for Fiona and Sean's wedding; Debbie contemplates showing up to the wedding, but ultimately decides on attending. Lip is bailed out of prison by Youens, who reveals that Lip is expelled from campus and urges him to seek AA treatment. Lip initially resists, but after talking with Debbie and Kevin, Lip realizes he is turning into Frank and agrees to attend AA meetings. Ian makes a successful case for getting his EMT job back. Carl tries to befriend Dominique's father, who makes it clear that he will never like him nor support his relationship with Dominique. Frank's plan to kill Sean fails, so he instead breaks into Sean's office. The following day, Frank crashes Fiona's wedding and reprimands his kids for never supporting him. He then reveals to the family that he sneaked into Sean's office and discovered that Sean is still using heroin, a fact that is unknown to Fiona. A distraught Will angrily leaves the ceremony, and Lip punches Frank in the face. Sean admits to a devastated Fiona that he has fallen back into addiction and has been using for months; he then leaves Fiona to save his situation with Will. Enraged by Frank's behavior, the whole Gallagher clan kidnap Frank and drop him down a freezing river.

== Development and production ==
Shameless was renewed for a sixth season on January 12, 2015; which premiered on January 10, 2016. The writers began working on the season on April 6, 2015. Principal photography for the season began on August 5, 2015.

== Reception ==
Review aggregator Rotten Tomatoes gives the sixth season 100%, based on 10 reviews. The critics consensus reads, "Shameless' sixth season charts a tragic trajectory for the Gallaghers, leaving viewers in suspense as they hope against hope that this family from the wrong side of the tracks can find long-lasting stability."
