= AbortionRules =

"#AbortionRules"
- Shameless episode
- Episode no.: Season 6 Episode 2
- Directed by: Iain B. MacDonald
- Written by: Nancy M. Pimental
- Cinematography by: Kevin McKnight
- Editing by: John M. Valerio
- Original release date: January 17, 2016
- Running time: 55 minutes

Guest appearances
- Dermot Mulroney as Sean Pierce; Sasha Alexander as Helene Runyon Robinson; Jenica Bergere as Lisa #1; Michael Reilly Burke as Theo Wallace; Isidora Goreshter as Svetlana Milkovich; Jinhee Joung as Jenny; Alan Rosenberg as Professor Youens; Will Sasso as Yanis; Chris Brochu as Dylan Robinson; Christopher Darga as Mr. Sullivan; Cathryn de Prune as Hilary; Dee Freeman as Mrs. Seery; Mary Pat Gleason as Drug Lord; Jim Hoffmaster as Kermit; Haley Mancini as Cancer Patient; Michael Patrick McGill as Tommy; Rebecca Metz as Melinda; Lee Stark as Lisa #2; Gabrielle Walsh as Tanya Delgado; Kurt Yaeger as Gene Charleston

Episode chronology
← Previous "I Only Miss Her When I'm Breathing"	Next → "The F Word"
- Shameless season 6

"#AbortionRules" is the second episode of the sixth season of the American television comedy drama Shameless, an adaptation of the British series of the same name. It is the 62nd overall episode of the series and was written by executive producer Nancy M. Pimental and directed by Iain B. MacDonald. It originally aired on Showtime on January 17, 2016.

The series is set on the South Side of Chicago, Illinois, and depicts the poor, dysfunctional family of Frank Gallagher, a neglectful single father of six: Fiona, Phillip, Ian, Debbie, Carl, and Liam. He spends his days drunk, high, or in search of money, while his children need to learn to take care of themselves. In the episode, Fiona tries to get Debbie to have an abortion, while Frank attempts to move on from Bianca's death.

According to Nielsen Media Research, the episode was seen by an estimated 1.64 million household viewers and gained a 0.7 ratings share among adults aged 18–49. The episode received mixed reviews from critics, who were divided over the episode's twist ending.

== Plot ==
Fiona (Emmy Rossum) is intent on getting an abortion for Debbie (Emma Kenney), despite Debbie claiming she wants to be a mother. To prove she is responsible, Debbie decides to take a bag of flour with her for one day. Meanwhile, Kevin (Steve Howey) is forced to intervene when Yanis (Will Sasso) has a tirade after his neighbors get his dogs taken away for their barking.

Carl (Ethan Cutkosky) and Nick (Victor I. Onuigbo) intimidate several stores for money, and Carl also smuggles guns into school to sell. Lip (Jeremy Allen White) feels worried over his presence with Helene (Sasha Alexander), especially after Theo (Michael Reilly Burke) makes it clear he is only having sex with her because he is allowing it. Youens (Alan Rosenberg) offers an internship to Lip, who accepts. When Fiona scolds him for arriving late to Patsy's, Ian (Cameron Monaghan) quits in a rage. Hipsters start frequenting the Alibi Room, after a review called it the "Best Shittiest Bar on the South Side", a term that Kevin and Svetlana (Isidora Goreshter) welcome.

Trying to forget about Bianca, Frank (William H. Macy) tries to burn her belongings in a hospital. He is stopped by one of Bianca's friends, who states that she only pursued him because she was dying. Frank later tries to pursue another woman, Hilary (Cathryn de Prume), who is also dying from late stage cancer. He introduces her to crack, but is alarmed when she dies, forcing him to flee. Debbie has second thoughts about her pregnancy after hearing her friends complain about their new lives, Derek's family confirming that he abandoned her, and losing her bag of flour on the subway.

As Fiona faces more pressure on her life, she is disappointed when Sean reveals he discovered heroin in Otis' locker and relapsed again. To complicate matters, a drug test is needed for Fiona, even though she has not used drugs. Fiona is shocked when the drug test reveals she is pregnant; she is unsure of who is the father. Upon arriving home, Fiona gets into a fight with Debbie, who plans to leave for Florida, only to be stopped by Lip. After Yanis once again wakes up the children with his motorcycle, Kevin sneaks in and cuts the motorcycle's throttle cable. The following morning, Yanis rides the motorcycle and crashes into a car, revealing that Kevin accidentally cut the brake line instead.

== Production ==
The episode was written by executive producer Nancy M. Pimental and directed by Iain B. MacDonald. It was Pimental's 14th writing credit, and MacDonald's first directing credit.

== Reception ==
=== Viewers ===
In its original American broadcast, "#AbortionRules" was seen by an estimated 1.64 million household viewers with a 0.7 in the 18–49 demographics. This means that 0.7 percent of all households with televisions watched the episode. This was a 13% increase in viewership from the previous episode, which was seen by an estimated 1.44 million household viewers with a 0.6 in the 18–49 demographics.

=== Critical reviews ===
"#AbortionRules" received mixed reviews from critics. Myles McNutt of The A.V. Club gave the episode a "C" grade and wrote, "Once I accept that television will always value the plot dynamics of a surprise pregnancy over the truth of the character involved, there's thematic weight to this development to Fiona. The pregnancy forces her to confront her path forward, and that's a positive step for the character and the show. But the way the story unfolded, and the episode around it, just never managed to find itself, which means there's work to do before the show gets to where it clearly wants to be."

Leslie Pariseau of Vulture gave the episode a 3 out of 5 star rating and wrote "By choosing Sean, a recovering addict and her boss, she encourages the instability, leaving open a possibility for the other shoe to drop. As for Sean himself, I can't quite figure out whether he's in this for the long haul, or if he'll become another disappointment along Fiona's troubled way." Hollis Andrews of The New York Observer wrote "I've always wondered if the writers were ever going to go down this road and I guess it was just a matter of time. I'm unsure as to how I want this to play out."

Amanda Michelle Steiner of Entertainment Weekly wrote "The season premiere gave me some hope about the direction of this season, but now I'm not so sure. But I'll be here until the bitter end, regardless, as I naïvely hope for good things to happen to this family." Allyson Johnson of The Young Folks gave the episode a 7 out of 10 rating and wrote "That group support and dynamic has been missing for quite a while now and bringing that back, rallying the troops so to speak, would be one good move in the right direction."

David Crow of Den of Geek gave the episode a perfect 5 star rating out of 5 and wrote, "this is what makes "#AbortionRules" such a strong continuation of an impressive kickoff to season 6. Whereas last week felt akin to catching us up with the Gallaghers at the Alibi, chatting about how they've been doing these past months — and perhaps sadly taking Mickey Milkovich out of the equation for a while — this week genuinely develops a real thrust for the New Year. And it looks to be posited on a grim but necessary question. How good of a parent is Fiona Gallagher?" Paul Dailly of TV Fanatic gave the episode a 4 star rating out of 5, and wrote, ""#AbortionRules" was another solid effort from this Showtime drama. Even after six years on the air, it's continuing to be one of the most compelling shows on the air and I can't wait to see what's next for these crazy characters."
