= Refugees (Shameless) =

- Shameless episode
- Episode no.: Season 6 Episode 5
- Directed by: Wendey Stanzler
- Written by: Etan Frankel
- Cinematography by: Kevin McKnight
- Editing by: Rob Bramwell
- Original release date: February 7, 2016
- Running time: 55 minutes

Guest appearances
- Dermot Mulroney as Sean Pierce (special guest star); Sasha Alexander as Helene Runyon Robinson (special guest star); Nichole Sakura as Amanda; Michael Reilly Burke as Theo Wallace; Vanessa Bell Calloway as Carol Fisher; Ever Carradine as Erika Wexler; Isidora Goreshter as Svetlana Milkovich; Michael McMillian as Tyler Wexler; Tyler Jacob Moore as Tony Markovich; Jeff Pierre as Caleb; Alan Rosenberg as Professor Youens; Andrew Asper as Jason; Jaylen Barron as Dominique Winslow; Rebecca Metz as Melinda

Episode chronology
← Previous "Going Once, Going Twice"	Next → "NSFW"
- Shameless season 6

"Refugees" is the fifth episode of the sixth season of the American television comedy drama Shameless, an adaptation of the British series of the same name. It is the 65th overall episode of the series and was written by co-executive producer Etan Frankel and directed by Wendey Stanzler. It originally aired on Showtime on February 7, 2016.

The series is set on the South Side of Chicago, Illinois, and depicts the poor, dysfunctional family of Frank Gallagher, a neglectful single father of six: Fiona, Phillip, Ian, Debbie, Carl, and Liam. He spends his days drunk, high, or in search of money, while his children need to learn to take care of themselves. In the episode, the Gallaghers face new challengers as they are evicted from their house.

According to Nielsen Media Research, the episode was seen by an estimated 1.16 million household viewers and gained a 0.5 ratings share among adults aged 18–49. The episode received positive reviews from critics, who praised the conflicts in the episode.

== Plot ==
The Gallaghers are struggling to accept they will have to leave their house, and Frank (William H. Macy) decides to destroy parts of the house and take anything valuable. When the new family arrives, they decide to give them one more week to stay. Nevertheless, the police arrive shortly and order the Gallaghers to leave as soon as possible.

Debbie (Emma Kenney) continues working in taking care of Erika (Ever Carradine) and her family, although she is disappointed that Tyler (Michael McMillian) does not pay her attention. Acting on Frank's advice, Debbie tries to tend to his "needs", but he pushes her away. She later convinces Tyler into letting her stay in the guest bedroom, lamenting that his family needs to be taken care of after Erika's death. Lip (Jeremy Allen White) is approached by Amanda (Nichole Sakura), who needs to take a picture of her mural on Lip's wall. After Lip leaves, Amanda finds his phone and decides to send his picture of a naked Helene (Sasha Alexander) to all his contacts.

Feeling guilty over Yanis' death, Kevin (Steve Howey) decides to temporarily take care of Asian child soldiers. Veronica (Shanola Hampton) does not like the idea, but later grows attached to them after finding out one of them turned out to be a girl (Peyton Elizabeth Lee). Sean (Dermot Mulroney) offers Fiona (Emmy Rossum) to stay with him, but she declines after realizing the offer is just for her and Liam. Realizing that Sean only asked her because his son Will is visiting and the arrangements must be placed in order, she finally accepts. Carl (Ethan Cutkosky) and Nick (Victor I. Onuigbo) stay with Kevin and Veronica, while also trying to find the person who trashed Nick's bicycle. Chuckie arrives at the Gallagher household and finds it locked, unaware that the family has been kicked out.

Ian joins the gay firefighters in a softball game with gay police officers, one of which includes Tony (Tyler Jacob Moore). He once again asks Caleb (Jeff Pierre) for a date, but he is rebuffed; Caleb makes it clear that while he is attracted to Ian, he does not want just to have sex with him. Ian assures him that is not the case, and they agree to go out on a date. Lip discovers that Helene's photo has reached the entire campus and tries to talk to her, but Theo (Michael Reilly Burke) refuses, also letting him know she is now facing disciplinary action. As she prepares for bed, Fiona tells Sean that she rescheduled her abortion, blaming it on the recent events. Before they continue their conversation, they get into a pillow fight with Liam and Will.

== Production ==
The episode was written by co-executive producer Etan Frankel and directed by Wendey Stanzler. It was Frankel's tenth writing credit, and Stanzler's second directing credit.

== Reception ==
=== Viewers ===
In its original American broadcast, "Refugees" was seen by an estimated 1.16 million household viewers with a 0.5 in the 18–49 demographics. This means that 0.5 percent of all households with televisions watched the episode. This was a 32 percent decrease in viewership from the previous episode, which was seen by an estimated 1.70 million household viewers with a 0.7 in the 18–49 demographics.

=== Critical reviews ===
"Refugees" received positive reviews from critics. Myles McNutt of The A.V. Club gave the episode a "B" grade and wrote, "The episode sets up a clear choice for Fiona: she can accept that Carl and Debbie and Ian are all making their own way and bring Liam with her into Sean's life, or she can hold onto the Gallagher family unit. It's a meaningful crossroads, but “Refugees” does make me ponder how meaningful a similar crossroads will be a year from now."

Leslie Pariseau of Vulture gave the episode a 4 out of 5 star rating and wrote "This week, Shameless finally delivers on the season's promises. "Refugees" is a clunky episode marked by awkward dialogue and annoying new alliances, but as the Gallaghers are suddenly flung far and wide across Chicago, the pace picks up to a sprint."

Amanda Michelle Steiner of Entertainment Weekly wrote "they ran out of chances last week, when they lost their home to foreclosure, unable to win it back at auction. And it's real. There's no hand-waving, TV magic on Shameless, and especially not recently: The Gallaghers are homeless." Allyson Johnson of The Young Folks gave the episode a 7 out of 10 rating and wrote "These are the moments that I still love about the show and the ones I hope to see each week. Maybe they'll grow less and less as the season progresses and as the characters are forced into out of character developments or tedious storylines, but the moments between the Gallaghers, no matter the range of emotions, are always worth the time spent."

David Crow of Den of Geek gave the episode a 3 star rating out of 5 and wrote, "Tonight though, was like sitting in the Alibi next to Frank telling dirty jokes. Some of them are funny and some are offensive. Either way, we've heard it before and are being distracted from the chance of trying out these new delicious tapas." Paul Dailly of TV Fanatic gave the episode a perfect 5 star rating out of 5, and wrote, ""Refugees" was another solid installment of this Showtime drama. Shameless Season 6 has done wonders for the longevity of the show, and it's clear that there are plenty more stories to tell before this one shows any signs of age."
