= Love Songs (In the Key of Gallagher) =

- Shameless episode
- Episode no.: Season 5 Episode 12
- Directed by: Christopher Chulack
- Written by: John Wells
- Cinematography by: Kevin McKnight
- Editing by: Kevin D. Ross
- Original release date: April 5, 2015
- Running time: 59 minutes

Guest appearances
- Dermot Mulroney as Sean Pierce; Steve Kazee as Gus Pfender; Sasha Alexander as Helene Runyon Robinson; Nichole Sakura as Amanda; Michael Reilly Burke as Theo Wallace Robinson; Vanessa Bell Calloway as Carol Fisher; Bojana Novakovic as Bianca Samson; Luca Oriel as Derek Delgado; Chloe Webb as Monica Gallagher; Dana Lyn Baron as Carrie; Hugo Bianqui as Ronaldo; Kate Morgan Chadwick as Shana; Ryan Dorsey as Walter; Barak Hardley as Jony; Chris Stills as Chris

Episode chronology
← Previous "Drugs Actually"	Next → "I Only Miss Her When I'm Breathing"
- Shameless season 5

"Love Songs (In the Key of Gallagher)" is the twelfth episode and season finale of the fifth season of the American television comedy drama Shameless, an adaptation of the British series of the same name. It is the 60th overall episode of the series and was written by series developer John Wells and directed by executive producer Christopher Chulack. It originally aired on Showtime on April 5, 2015.

The series is set on the South Side of Chicago, Illinois, and depicts the poor, dysfunctional family of Frank Gallagher, a neglectful single father of six: Fiona, Phillip, Ian, Debbie, Carl, and Liam. He spends his days drunk, high, or in search of money, while his children need to learn to take care of themselves. In the episode, Frank spends time with Bianca in Costa Rica, while Ian leaves with Monica. The episode marked the final appearance of Emily Bergl in the series.

According to Nielsen Media Research, the episode was seen by an estimated 1.55 million household viewers and gained a 0.7 ratings share among adults aged 18–49. The episode received generally positive reviews from critics, although some questioned the closure of Ian and Mickey's storyline.

== Plot ==
Frank (William H. Macy) and Bianca (Bojana Novakovic) are enjoying a vacation in Costa Rica. Despite Bianca's enthusiasm, her health continues worsening. Ian (Cameron Monaghan) and Monica (Chloe Webb) have been hitchhiking, although Ian is confused over how Monica gets to earn money for their expenses.

While Lip (Jeremy Allen White) is content with his relationship with Helene (Sasha Alexander), Amanda (Nichole Sakura) makes it clear she dislikes it and grows upset when Lip abandons her for other activities, believing him to dump her for Helene. Kevin (Steve Howey) and Veronica (Shanola Hampton) go to the doctor, where Kevin has himself checked for any potential STD. While he is not diagnosed with anything, Veronica is taken aback when Kevin reveals he slept with more than 20 college students during their break-up. Carol (Vanessa Bell Calloway) suggests Veronica should role play as a schoolgirl to get Kevin's attention, but Kevin is uninterested. As they argue, the babies start crying, but Kevin surprises Veronica by staying with her, reconciling.

Fiona (Emmy Rossum) is shocked when she walks in on Debbie (Emma Kenney) and Derek (Luca Oriel) having sex. When Debbie suggests she might be pregnant, Fiona scolds her as she might ruin her life. She advises Debbie to get an abortion, but Debbie insists on keeping the baby. With Gus (Steve Kazee) back from his tour, Fiona still decides to seduce Sean (Dermot Mulroney), but he dismisses her advances. When Fiona shares her problems with Gus, it is clear neither Gus nor Fiona are interested in their marriage. The following day, Fiona finds that Gus left her apartment, and his bandmate asks her to end her relationship for the sake of Gus. Fiona later goes with Sean, admitting her feelings for him, but Sean only tells her to grow up.

Monica takes Ian to the trailer home of her boyfriend Walter (Ryan Dorsey), who takes a dislike to Ian. Ian discovers that Monica has been selling methamphetamine, with Walter acting as the cook. Monica defends her actions, claiming this can give them the happy life they deserve. Fed up with Lip's actions, Amanda slaps him and breaks up with him. Back in Costa Rica, Frank buys a gun when Bianca asks him, but is alarmed when she plays Russian roulette. While staring at the ocean, Bianca thanks Frank for making her happy in her final days. The following morning, she leaves a note for Frank, takes off her clothes and swims in the ocean to presumably drown herself. A desperate Frank tries to find her, but eventually realizes what she did.

Ian returns to Chicago and calls Mickey (Noel Fisher) to meet him at his house. Ian makes it clear he will not use his meds, and then breaks up with Mickey, feeling he will not truly love him for what he is now. Suddenly, Sammi (Emily Bergl) arrives and starts shooting at Mickey for trying to kill her. Their chase goes through the neighborhood until police cruisers arrive. As Ian and Lip discuss the recent events, a depressed Frank is shown arriving home. At a juvenile prison, Carl (Ethan Cutkosky) and Chuckie (Kellen Michael) get into a fight with their respective gangs.

== Production ==
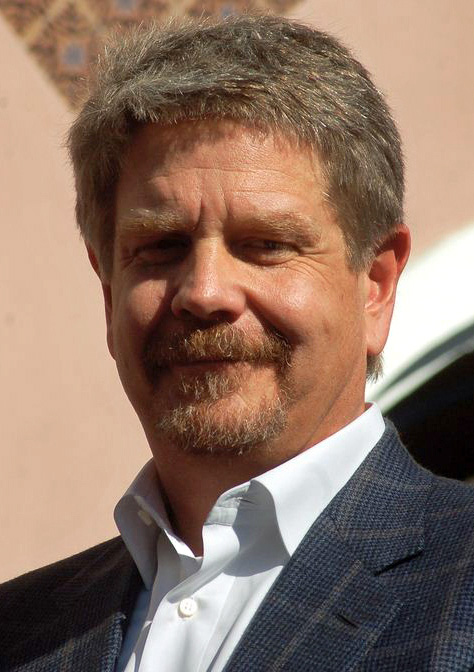
The episode was written by John Wells.

The episode was written by series developer John Wells and directed by executive producer Christopher Chulack. It was Wells' 11th writing credit, and Chulack's fourth directing credit.

The decision to break up Ian and Mickey, portrayed by Cameron Monaghan and Noel Fisher respectively, was written as a result of Fisher deciding not to return as a series regular for the sixth season. In an interview with The Hollywood Reporter, series developer John Wells revealed that Fisher decided not to renew his contract to pursue other projects: "[Fisher] was going to do a movie and wasn't prepared to sign on for another year, so I have to check back in with him in a few months and see. He has a very thriving film career, and we really just hired him for a few episodes when we started, but we keep expanding it, and he always comes back when he's available. So, some of where the characters end up will be dictated by availability." The break-up scene between Ian and Mickey was controversial among fans, many of whom sent death threats to Wells following the airing of the episode. Fisher would ultimately continue to make guest appearances in subsequent seasons, before officially returning as a series regular in the show's tenth season.

== Reception ==
=== Viewers ===
In its original American broadcast, "Love Songs (In the Key of Gallagher)" was seen by an estimated 1.55 million household viewers with a 0.7 in the 18–49 demographics. This means that 0.7 percent of all households with televisions watched the episode. This was a 8% increase in viewership from the previous episode, which was seen by an estimated 1.43 million household viewers with a 0.6 in the 18–49 demographics.

=== Critical reviews ===
"Love Songs (In the Key of Gallagher)" received positive reviews from critics. Joshua Alston of The A.V. Club gave the episode a "B" grade and wrote, "John Wells wrote the finale, as is customary for each season with the exception of the third, and it follows the loping rhythm of Wells' previous finales, full of suspense-free cliffhangers and the wiping of slates in preparation for the season to come." Alston expressed mixed feelings over Ian and Mickey's break-up scene, writing "Maybe I'm too invested in their relationship, but the break-up felt rushed, and I think it's due to the difficulty of following Ian's emotional journey. [...] Cameron Monaghan and Noel Fisher do good work as usual, but it doesn't remotely feel like a break-up that could stick, so the beat doesn't land as hard as it should."

Alan Sepinwall's review for HitFix was generally positive, writing "This was something of a transition year, for both the show and the family – Fiona adjusting to life on probation, Ian battling both his illness and the side effects of its treatment, Debbie trying to embrace her sexuality too soon, Kev and Vee struggling with new parenthood – but one with the kind of highs (particularly anything to do with Ian and Mickey) we know the series is capable of." Marc Snetiker of Entertainment Weekly particularly highlighted Noel Fisher's performance in the final break-up scene: "The range of expressions on Noel Fisher's face should really drive home that this kid deserves some Emmy Awards love for continuously delivering the series' best performance."

Allyson Johnson of The Young Folks gave the episode a 7.5 out of 10 rating. Johnson was polarized over the decision to break up Ian and Mickey: "They were easily two of the more compelling characters this season and their relationship continues to be a highlight of the show, handled with a skillful voice that understands these two characters and their baggage. This all makes their scene ending so abruptly all the most frustrating." Johnson also had mixed feelings on Sammi's return in the final scene, writing "It was an abrupt ending and one that didn't gel with the rest of the episode that was on the quieter, introspective side." Johnson ultimately gave the fifth season an 8 out of 10, concluding "It never quite hit the peak of season four but it was a season that played more with the inner workings of the characters than the hi-jinks [they] got up to. [...] It was a season of characters looking for happiness, or a sense of purpose or a clarity of mind and realizing along the way who stays and who goes and what's achievable or even realistic."

David Crow of Den of Geek gave the episode a 4 star rating out of 5 and wrote, "Watching a finale like this, we all probably feel as confused and chagrined as that wayward Gallagher patriarch, thunderstruck by the odd beauty (or humor) in this ugly side of life." Crow commended the closure to Frank and Bianca's relationship, praising the dramatic content of the storyline: "It's a bleak tragedy hidden in a tropical paradise that is smiling about pill addiction even in the face of suicide." Whitney Evans of TV Fanatic gave the episode a 4.8 star rating out of 5. Commenting on the season as a whole, Evans wrote, "To me, nothing beats Shameless Season 4. It felt the most complete and I really felt like everyone elevated their performances and the stories were incredible. So if that's the holy grail season, I'd have to rate this season just a notch below that, but not by much."
