= I Only Miss Her When I'm Breathing =

- Shameless episode
- Episode no.: Season 6 Episode 1
- Directed by: Christopher Chulack
- Written by: John Wells
- Cinematography by: Kevin McKnight
- Editing by: John M. Valerio
- Original release date: January 10, 2016
- Running time: 57 minutes

Guest appearances
- Noel Fisher as Mickey Milkovich; Dermot Mulroney as Sean Pierce; Sasha Alexander as Helene Runyon Robinson; Jenica Bergere as Lisa #1; Isidora Goreshter as Svetlana Milkovich; José Julián as Joaquin; Luca Oriel as Derek Delgado; Alan Rosenberg as Professor Youens; Will Sasso as Yanis; Chris Brochu as Dylan Robinson; Jim Hoffmaster as Kermit; Michael Patrick McGill as Tommy; Rebecca Metz as Melinda; Marisol Ramirez as Celia Delgado; Lee Stark as Lisa #2

Episode chronology
← Previous "Love Songs (In the Key of Gallagher)"	Next → "#AbortionRules"
- Shameless season 6

"I Only Miss Her When I'm Breathing" is the first episode of the sixth season of the American television comedy drama Shameless, an adaptation of the British series of the same name. It is the 61st overall episode of the series and was written by series developer John Wells and directed by executive producer Christopher Chulack. It aired on Showtime on January 10, 2016, but it was available online on January 1, 2016.

The series is set on the South Side of Chicago, Illinois, and depicts the poor, dysfunctional family of Frank Gallagher, a neglectful single father of six: Fiona, Phillip, Ian, Debbie, Carl, and Liam. He spends his days drunk, high, or in search of money, while his children need to learn to take care of themselves. In the episode, Frank grieves Bianca's death, while Fiona tries to handle her new life with Sean.

According to Nielsen Media Research, the episode was seen by an estimated 1.44 million household viewers and gained a 0.6 ratings share among adults aged 18–49. The episode received positive reviews from critics, who considered a solid start to the season. For the episode, William H. Macy received a nomination for Outstanding Lead Actor in a Comedy Series at the 68th Primetime Emmy Awards.

== Plot ==
A grief-stricken Frank (William H. Macy) is kicked out of the cemetery, where he was sleeping on Bianca's grave. Fiona (Emmy Rossum) is now separated from Gus, and is now dating Sean (Dermot Mulroney), who often stays at the Gallagher household.

Fiona takes Debbie (Emma Kenney) to a clinic to confirm her pregnancy. The doctor confirms it, but Debbie hides this from Fiona. She tells Derek (Luca Oriel) about the pregnancy, but Derek is not as delighted. At Patsy's, the assistant manager, Otis, arrives constantly late, causing Sean to ponder if he has relapsed into drugs. When police officers arrive, Otis flees but is quickly captured. Otis is not revealed to have relapsed, but the police discovered he had a meth lab at his house. Without an assistant manager, Sean offers the position to Fiona. Kevin (Steve Howey) is asked by his neighbors to sign a petition to get their homophobic neighbor, Yanis (Will Sasso), to stop making noise. Kevin asks him to stop, but Yanis refuses.

Frank finds himself lost in his grief, questioning why Bianca was taken away from him. After fighting with a local priest, he decides to find answers in religion. He visits several temples, but he is not taken seriously by any of the representatives. Lip (Jeremy Allen White) continues his relationship with Helene (Sasha Alexander), and also begins to work as a teaching assistant for Professor Youens (Alan Rosenberg), a drunk but highly decorated teacher. Youens often arrives late, forcing Lip to start the class without him. An impressed Youens tells Lip he should consider teaching. Carl (Ethan Cutkosky), released early from juvie for good behavior, returns to the Gallagher home with a new street refined persona; the family is shocked to find that he is bringing along a friend, Nick (Victor I. Onuigbo).

Svetlana (Isidora Goreshter) convinces Ian (Cameron Monaghan) in accompanying her to visit Mickey (Noel Fisher) in prison. Mickey does Russian mafia hits for cash from Svetlana, and Ian tells him he will wait for him. Debbie visits Derek's mother when he cuts off ties, and discovers that he moved to Florida, leaving her as the sole parent. When he hears a rumor that Helene might be seeing another student, Lip attacks him outside her house. However, he is shocked to discover the person is just her son Dylan (Chris Brochu). Helene confronts Lip for his actions, although they do not end their relationship. Derek's parents show up at the Gallagher household, disclosing Debbie's pregnancy to everyone.

== Production ==
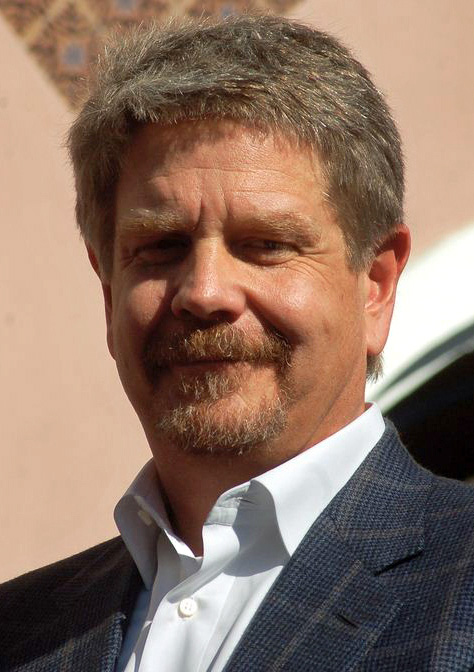
The episode was written by John Wells.

The episode was written by series developer John Wells and directed by executive producer Christopher Chulack. It was Wells' 12th writing credit, and Chulack's fifth directing credit.

== Reception ==
=== Viewers ===
In its original American broadcast, "I Only Miss Her When I'm Breathing" was seen by an estimated 1.44 million household viewers with a 0.6 in the 18–49 demographics. This means that 0.6 percent of all households with televisions watched the episode. This was a 8% decrease in viewership from the previous episode, which was seen by an estimated 1.55 million household viewers with a 0.7 in the 18–49 demographics.

=== Critical reviews ===
"I Only Miss Her When I'm Breathing" received positive reviews from critics. Myles McNutt of The A.V. Club gave the episode a "B" grade and wrote, "Every serialized show will eventually run out of story to tell, and I do think Shameless will eventually get there. But the soapcom structure means Shameless lacks a predetermined end point, and so it's up to Wells and the writers to find the substance in the everyday. And while there are always concerns over how that substance is generated, and the way the show's commitment to tonal imbalance colors its story developments, I ultimately have faith that the show still has something to say about class and family through the lens of the Gallaghers, and the premiere reflects that."

Leslie Pariseau of Vulture gave the episode a 4 out of 5 star rating and wrote "Of course, there are other things going on "I Only Miss Her When I'm Breathing" but the most interesting plotlines converge in the Gallagher teens' struggles to leap directly from childhood to adulthood. In both Debbie and Carl's cases, adolescence truly is a construct they have chosen to forgo."

Amanda Michelle Steiner of Entertainment Weekly wrote "season 5 of Shameless was, to be kind, a little uneven. The season 6 premiere, however, was a funny, depressing, heartrending, typically-Gallagher return to form." Allyson Johnson of The Young Folks gave the episode a 7.5 out of 10 rating and wrote "It's not a great episode but it does feel as if the show is trying to clean themselves up a bit even if they rely too easily on their shocking (borderline offensive) humor to get by."

David Crow of Den of Geek wrote, "Season 5 was not my favorite year, but season 6 is off to a rollicking start that is so satisfying that perhaps we should also crank out a selfie stick and all start posing now?" Paul Dailly of TV Fanatic gave the episode a 4.5 star rating out of 5, and wrote, ""I Only Miss Her When I'm Breathing" was a very solid opener that has me very excited about where the show will go this year. The writing and acting continues to be a cut above anything else on television and I can't wait to see what's next."

=== Accolades ===
William H. Macy submitted the episode to support his nomination for Outstanding Lead Actor in a Comedy Series at the 68th Primetime Emmy Awards. He would lose the award to Jeffrey Tambor for Transparent.
