= NSFW (Shameless) =

- Shameless episode
- Episode no.: Season 6 Episode 6
- Directed by: Jake Schreier
- Written by: Sheila Callaghan
- Cinematography by: Kevin McKnight
- Editing by: John M. Valerio
- Original release date: February 14, 2016
- Running time: 54 minutes

Guest appearances
- Dermot Mulroney as Sean Pierce (special guest star); Sherilyn Fenn as Queenie Slott (special guest star); Steve Kazee as Gus Pfender (special guest star); Sasha Alexander as Helene Runyon Robinson (special guest star); Nichole Sakura as Amanda; Ever Carradine as Erika Wexler; Isidora Goreshter as Svetlana Milkovich; José Julián as Joaquin; Jeff Pierre as Caleb; Alan Rosenberg as Professor Youens; Jim Hoffmaster as Kermit; Rich Hutchman as Peter MacGowan; Michael Patrick McGill as Tommy; Rebecca Metz as Melinda; Victor I. Onuigbo as Nick; George Wyner as Provost Keegan

Episode chronology
← Previous "Refugees"	Next → "Pimp's Paradise"
- Shameless season 6

"NSFW" is the sixth episode of the sixth season of the American television comedy drama Shameless, an adaptation of the British series of the same name. It is the 66th overall episode of the series and was written by co-executive producer Sheila Callaghan and directed by Jake Schreier. It originally aired on Showtime on February 14, 2016.

The series is set on the South Side of Chicago, Illinois, and depicts the poor, dysfunctional family of Frank Gallagher, a neglectful single father of six: Fiona, Phillip, Ian, Debbie, Carl, and Liam. He spends his days drunk, high, or in search of money, while his children need to learn to take care of themselves. In the episode, Fiona finds a possible way to get the house back, while Carl realizes the consequences of his lifestyle.

According to Nielsen Media Research, the episode was seen by an estimated 1.60 million household viewers and gained a 0.6 ratings share among adults aged 18–49. The episode received generally positive reviews from critics, who praised the dark nature of the episode.

== Plot ==
Carl (Ethan Cutkosky) enjoys a luxurious life at a hotel, although Nick (Victor I. Onuigbo) is still intent on getting his bicycle back. Later on, he discovers a boy took it and follows him to find his house. Debbie (Emma Kenney) is annoyed when Erika (Ever Carradine) starts sleeping in her bedroom and trying to flirt with her, but Frank (William H. Macy) instructs Debbie to tolerate Erika until she dies.

Lip (Jeremy Allen White) is horrified to learn that the explicit photo has now reached Gawker, and the provost wants him to give a statement to the disciplinary committee. He tries to get Amanda (Nichole Sakura) to recant her statement but she refuses; she also reveals she is leaving campus as a feminist group is harassing her for ruining Helene's career. Fiona (Emmy Rossum) breaks into the house to retrieve a closet door, when she runs into an inspector and the owner. The inspector notes that due to the extremely poor living conditions of the house, the costs exceed its value, and the owner decides to pull out of bidding. Fiona then consults with the bank, and is allowed to pay her bid. However, as she is married, she needs Gus' signature to rescind his ownership of the house.

Ian (Cameron Monaghan) goes on his date with Caleb (Jeff Pierre), although Ian is worried about his behavior. Their date is interrupted when Caleb is called for a fire incident, after a woman stabbed a man. As Caleb and the firefighters help the man, Ian checks the woman's arm and bandages it, surprising Caleb. Lip testifies at the committee, dismissing any damage. When Helene (Sasha Alexander) testifies, she says the relationship is over, and the committee also points out Lip is not the first student she had sex with. After the meeting is over, Lip tries to talk to her, but she tells him to never contact her. Kevin (Steve Howey) manages to get the previous customers of the Alibi back, as well as charging $20 to any hipster just to enter.

As Debbie prepares a party for her gender reveal, she and Frank are shocked when Erika reveals her cancer is in remission, ruining their plans. During the party, Nick suddenly leaves, taking the car to take back his bicycle. Carl eventually reaches the boy's house and finds a shaken Nick sitting at the entrance with a bloodied hammer beside him. Hearing a woman yelling inside, Carl enters and vomits upon discovering that Nick had murdered the kid. Nick instructs Carl to leave, as he has already called the police; Carl moves away and witnesses the police arresting Nick. Distraught by the encounter, Carl visits Sean (Dermot Mulroney) and asks to stay at his apartment.

While contacting a notary, Fiona finally gets her abortion. After constant delays, Gus (Steve Kazee) meets with Fiona to sign the papers. However, Gus is not interested in helping Fiona, especially because she does not want to give him his grandmother's ring. He ultimately pours coffee on the papers and walks out without signing. A defeated Fiona returns with Sean, tearfully lamenting the situation she put her family in; Carl watches from another room. Meanwhile, Frank returns to the house and discovers Chuckie (Kellen Michael) sleeping in a tent; Chuckie tells him that Sammi has called someone to take care of him. The following morning, Frank is surprised to learn that the person was Sammi's mother, Queenie (Sherilyn Fenn). As they reunite, they start making out. Carl digs up all his drug money and gives it to Fiona, telling her to use it to buy the house.

== Production ==
"NSFW" was written by Sheila Callaghan.

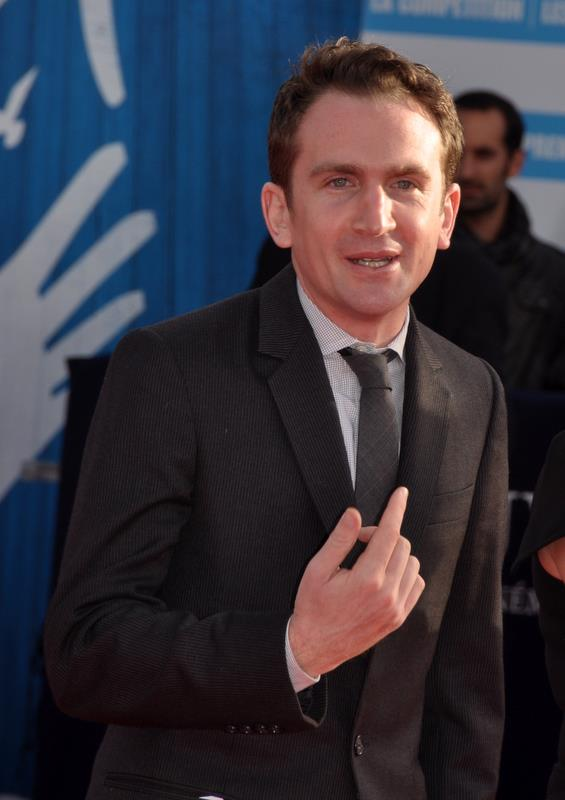
The episode was directed by Jake Schreier.

The episode was written by co-executive producer Sheila Callaghan and directed by Jake Schreier. It was Callaghan's seventh writing credit, and Schreier's first directing credit.

== Reception ==
=== Viewers ===
In its original American broadcast, "NSFW" was seen by an estimated 1.60 million household viewers with a 0.6 in the 18–49 demographics. This means that 0.6 percent of all households with televisions watched the episode. This was a 37 percent increase in viewership from the previous episode, which was seen by an estimated 1.16 million household viewers with a 0.7 in the 18–49 demographics.

=== Critical reviews ===
"NSFW" received generally positive reviews from critics. Myles McNutt of The A.V. Club gave the episode a "B–" grade and wrote, "While our reading of “truth” remains highly subjective depending on those relationships, it has been shaped more by the text than by any sort of social reality. And so with “NSFW,” we find a version of Shameless that backtracks on an interesting story development, and where the search for the Gallaghers' respective truths seems more haphazard than ever before. There is room to course-correct, and that search can itself be a productive story engine, but we're halfway through the season and I would have hoped for a clearer outlook at this stage."

Leslie Pariseau of Vulture gave the episode a 4 out of 5 star rating and wrote "Characters may surprise or disappoint us at the turn of a dime, making decisions we never saw coming. Yet, however oddly, things always work out for the Gallaghers. If anything, Shameless tracks how families cope in the most bombastic, disproportionate ways. And to cope, one must simply scooch forward." Dara Driscoll of TV Overmind wrote "At this moment, I am ready to declare that “NSFW” is my favorite episode from Shameless Season 6. It gave me chills. There is no doubt that “NSFW” is the emotional climax of the season, if not the entire show. Fan favorites did a lot of growing up tonight, and the show took a darker turn, that could be really compelling if the writers choose to follow it."

Amanda Michelle Steiner of Entertainment Weekly wrote "Given how hard Fiona works to keep her head above water, it's astonishing how often she's let sound judgment fly out the window in favor of her own pleasure — a tendency that has defined Frank for as long as we've known him and one you'd think she'd consciously try to keep from defining her. But on this week's Shameless, Fiona is still suffering the blowback from how she treated her estranged husband, Gus, and she nearly loses her home (again) because of it." Allyson Johnson of The Young Folks gave the episode a 7 out of 10 rating and wrote "I don't think I know a Shameless where Fiona isn't trying to pick up the pieces of some mess but it will be interesting to see her focus on herself for once."

David Crow of Den of Geek gave the episode a 3.5 star rating out of 5 and wrote, "it was a mostly satisfying hour of television and featured great moments for Fiona, Frank, Debbie, and suddenly Carl, who even with his ridiculous cornrows is on track to possibly being a season 6 MVP. Who knew?" Paul Dailly of TV Fanatic gave the episode a 3.2 star rating out of 5, and wrote, ""NSFW" was lacking the spark that the rest of the season has had thus far, and the random murder kind of changed the tone for the worse. Hopefully it's back to business next week because it's not as fun if it's all serious."
