= Going Once, Going Twice =

- Shameless episode
- Episode no.: Season 6 Episode 4
- Directed by: Christopher Chulack
- Written by: Davey Holmes
- Cinematography by: Kevin McKnight
- Editing by: John M. Valerio
- Original release date: January 31, 2016
- Running time: 57 minutes

Guest appearances
- Dermot Mulroney as Sean Pierce (special guest star); Sasha Alexander as Helene Runyon Robinson (special guest star); Ever Carradine as Erika Wexler; Isidora Goreshter as Svetlana Milkovich; Michael McMillian as Tyler Wexler; Jeff Pierre as Caleb; Will Sasso as Yanis; Brent Sexton as Patrick Gallagher; Andrew Asper as Jason; Jaylen Barron as Dominique Winslow; Amin El Gamal as Adrian Mitchen; Michael Ferman as Auctioneer; Jim Hoffmaster as Kermit; Rich Hutchman as Peter MacGowan

Episode chronology
← Previous "The F Word"	Next → "Refugees"
- Shameless season 6

"Going Once, Going Twice" is the fourth episode of the sixth season of the American television comedy drama Shameless, an adaptation of the British series of the same name. It is the 64th overall episode of the series and was written by executive producer Davey Holmes and directed by executive producer Christopher Chulack. It originally aired on Showtime on January 31, 2016.

The series is set on the South Side of Chicago, Illinois, and depicts the poor, dysfunctional family of Frank Gallagher, a neglectful single father of six: Fiona, Phillip, Ian, Debbie, Carl, and Liam. He spends his days drunk, high, or in search of money, while his children need to learn to take care of themselves. In the episode, Fiona tries to prevent the family's eviction, while Ian visits a firehouse to meet the man who saved him.

According to Nielsen Media Research, the episode was seen by an estimated 1.70 million household viewers and gained a 0.7 ratings share among adults aged 18–49. The episode received positive reviews from critics, who expressed surprise with the episode's ending.

== Plot ==
The Gallaghers are given 72 hours to find money needed to buy the house or face eviction. Fiona (Emmy Rossum) and Sean (Dermot Mulroney) visit Patrick (Brent Sexton), who confirms he took a $60,000 loan on the house and is unable to pay it, resulting in their eviction. To complicate matters, Chuckie (Kellen Michael) is now forced to live with the Gallaghers, as Sammi is still in prison.

Frank (William H. Macy) tries to set Debbie (Emma Kenney) up with terminally ill men to take over their wealth, but Debbie rejects all of the options. Lip (Jeremy Allen White) accompanies Helene (Sasha Alexander) to an academic conference in Indianapolis, where she will promote her new book based on her research. However, at the conference, a man notes that new discoveries in the past weeks have basically dismissed the entire book, devastating Helene. She gets drunk and tries to get Lip to have sex with her in public, which he declines. After she vomits in the bathroom, Helene laments the situation, and suggests Lip will find the right woman for his age. The following morning, as they leave, Helene asks Lip to forget their conversation and the conference.

With Patrick unwilling to help the family, Fiona and Sean meet with a friend to consult on their financial situation. Fiona is surprised when she is told that she is eligible for a $100,000 loan as she never had a credit card, but she must pay $3,500 for the down payment. As Fiona tries to get money from her family, Carl (Ethan Cutkosky) offers to pay the entire payment with his firearms money, which Fiona refuses. Ian (Cameron Monaghan) visits the firehouse to thank the firefighters for saving him, and is surprised to learn there is an entire group of gay firefighters. Ian tries to flirt with the firefighter who saved him but learns he is married; he ends up exchanging a conversation with another co-worker, Caleb (Jeff Pierre). Kevin (Kevin Howey) is upset upon seeing that the hipsters have stopped frequenting the Alibi Room, later realizing that the bar's advertising of the scathing review made them leave.

Frank presents Debbie with a new opportunity: a babysitting job for the Wexler family, whose mother Erika (Ever Carradine) is dying. Debbie is initially uninterested, but chooses to accept after meeting the father, Tyler (Michael McMillian). Kevin catches Yanis (Will Sasso) trying to light a house on fire, believing the owner to have caused his accident. Kevin finally reveals he is responsible; Yanis tries to light him on fire, but ends up setting himself on fire by accident. After pawning Gus' grandmother ring to get the loan, Fiona and her siblings attend the bidding. While they offer $100,000, other people end up bidding for more, and the house is eventually sold to an unnamed couple for $130,000. Fiona and her family are left devastated, realizing they are now homeless.

== Production ==
The episode was written by executive producer Davey Holmes and directed by executive producer Christopher Chulack. It was Holmes' sixth writing credit, and Chulack's sixth directing credit.

== Reception ==
=== Viewers ===
In its original American broadcast, "Going Once, Going Twice" was seen by an estimated 1.70 million household viewers with a 0.7 in the 18–49 demographics. This means that 0.7 percent of all households with televisions watched the episode. This was steady in viewership from the previous episode, which was seen by an estimated 1.70 million household viewers with a 0.7 in the 18–49 demographics.

=== Critical reviews ===
"Going Once, Going Twice" received positive reviews from critics. Myles McNutt of The A.V. Club gave the episode a "B" grade and wrote, "It's a good thing that the Gallaghers’ future is uncertain — it's better for the show that the path forward is unpredictable, and so pulling the trigger on losing the house is a positive development for the season ahead. But it also creates storytelling issues that the writers have struggled with in recent seasons, adding a degree of difficulty that will require careful navigation, and the coming weeks will be an important test of how the show intends to move forward in the next two seasons."

Leslie Pariseau of Vulture gave the episode a 3 out of 5 star rating and wrote "Like the last episode, "Going Once, Going Twice" feels aimless. Its storylines drift along the ebbing Gallagher tide, only to coalesce in a loss that isn't quite believable." Amanda Michelle Steiner of Entertainment Weekly wrote "while not a single one of them has ever been able to live peacefully for a full season, they'd always had a place to land: their home. Ramshackle though it is, it was theirs. (Well, kind of.) Last week, they were served an eviction notice. “Going Once, Going Twice” deals primarily in the fallout from that, and the episode's title pretty much spells out the inevitable."

David Crow of Den of Geek gave the episode a 4 star rating out of 5 and wrote, "We'll find out just how far down this evicted rabbit hole Shameless will go when moving day comes next week! In the meantime, I'm just going to enjoy the feeling of the series still pulling the rug out from under me six years in." Paul Dailly of TV Fanatic gave the episode a 4.6 star rating out of 5, and wrote, ""Going Once, Going Twice" was the best episode of the season. It had laughs, shocks and death. It appears like the show is making up for the downturn in quality in Shameless Season 5."
