= Drugs Actually =

- Shameless episode
- Episode no.: Season 5 Episode 11
- Directed by: Mimi Leder
- Written by: Davey Holmes
- Cinematography by: Kevin McKnight
- Editing by: Tim Tommasino
- Original release date: March 29, 2015
- Running time: 55 minutes

Guest appearances
- Dermot Mulroney as Sean Pierce; Steve Kazee as Gus Pfender; Sasha Alexander as Helene Runyon Robinson; Patrick Bristow as Bill; Michael Reilly Burke as Theo Wallace Robinson; Isidora Goreshter as Svetlana; Lenny Jacobson as Norbert; Bojana Novakovic as Bianca Samson; Chloe Webb as Monica Gallagher; Blake Boyd as Nathan Kipps; Christopher Goodman as Clerk; Annie Little as Elizabeth; Michael Patrick McGill as Tommy

Episode chronology
← Previous "South Side Rules"	Next → "Love Songs (In the Key of Gallagher)"
- Shameless season 5

"Drugs Actually" is the eleventh episode of the fifth season of the American television comedy drama Shameless, an adaptation of the British series of the same name. It is the 59th overall episode of the series and was written by executive producer Davey Holmes and directed by Mimi Leder. It originally aired on Showtime on March 29, 2015.

The series is set on the South Side of Chicago, Illinois, and depicts the poor, dysfunctional family of Frank Gallagher, a neglectful single father of six: Fiona, Phillip, Ian, Debbie, Carl, and Liam. He spends his days drunk, high, or in search of money, while his children need to learn to take care of themselves. In the episode, Ian faces a possible court-martial, while Frank is worried by Bianca's reckless behavior.

According to Nielsen Media Research, the episode was seen by an estimated 1.43 million household viewers and gained a 0.6 ratings share among adults aged 18–49. The episode received critical acclaim, with critics praising the performances (particularly Monaghan and Macy), writing, character development, humor and tone.

== Plot ==
Frank (William H. Macy) continues accompanying Bianca (Bojana Novakovic), who buys a $10,000 bottle of whiskey for themselves. Lip (Jeremy Allen White) is still in a sexual relationship with Helene (Sasha Alexander), and grows to enjoy the benefits of the open relationship, as he gets himself invited to an exclusive party.

Ian (Cameron Monaghan) is held in custody, facing charges for going AWOL, damaging equipment and falsifying Lip's ID to enroll, which could lead to a court-martial. Fiona (Emmy Rossum) consults with the military investigator to discuss Ian's bipolar disorder, claiming it is affecting his view, but Ian is still not willing to accept the diagnosis. Debbie (Emma Kenney) and Mickey (Noel Fisher) want to take revenge against Sammi (Emily Bergl), who proclaimed she will move out of the house the following day. Fiona is taken by surprise when Gus (Steve Kazee) returns home after his tour has been cancelled, but she is dismissive of his questions, preferring to stay with Sean (Dermot Mulroney).

Feeling ecstatic, Bianca convinces Frank to try sex on the train tracks. Just as she reaches an orgasm, a train almost hits them, but they move aside just in time. While Bianca is not bothered, Frank is shaken by the experience. Later, Bianca tries crack for the first time and has sex with Frank in the Gallagher household. As Kevin (Steve Howey) tries to fix a broken pipe at the Alibi Room, Veronica (Shanola Hampton) argues with him over only returning because Lip kicked him out. As they apologize over cheating each other, they seize the leak to have sex in the bar, reconciling. At the party, Helene introduces Lip to a friend who works at aerospace, although Lip debates over choosing his new life to his old life.

Ian is visited by Monica (Chloe Webb), who has kept in touch with him. Monica consoles her son, telling him he does not have to change for anyone. Mickey drugs Sammi with rohypnol, but he and Debbie are shocked when Sammi appears to have died. They decide to hide Sammi's body in a storage container; it is later revealed that Sammi is actually alive. Bianca discovers that Frank called her family to help her accept chemotherapy, and she decides to leave for Costa Rica to spend her last days. Frank opens up, explaining that he was afraid of never seeing her again, and she allows him to accompany her. When Fiona and Mickey visit once again the facility, they are informed that Ian has been allowed to be released. However, they are astonished to learn that Ian already left with Monica.

== Production ==
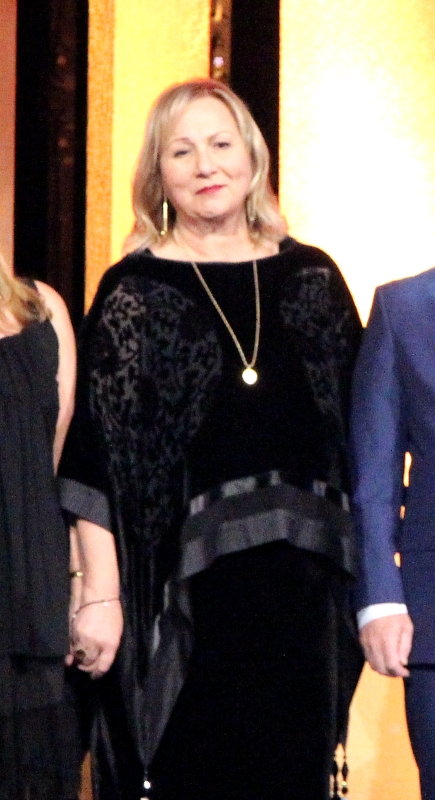
The episode was directed by Mimi Leder.

The episode was written by executive producer Davey Holmes and directed by Mimi Leder. It was Holmes' fifth writing credit, and Leder's fifth directing credit.

== Reception ==
=== Viewers ===
In its original American broadcast, "Drugs Actually" was seen by an estimated 1.43 million household viewers with a 0.6 in the 18–49 demographics. This means that 0.6 percent of all households with televisions watched the episode. This was a 15% decrease in viewership from the previous episode, which was seen by an estimated 1.67 million household viewers with a 0.7 in the 18–49 demographics.

=== Critical reviews ===
"Drugs Actually" received critical acclaim. Joshua Alston of The A.V. Club gave the episode an "A" grade and wrote, ""Drugs Actually" has everything that makes Shameless so addictive when it's firing on all cylinders: dysfunctional love; emotional turmoil; weird, gross sex; pitch-black humor; and brave, breathtaking performances. It's about people living complicated lives the only way they know how: by doing the things that feel most natural and sensible to them, whether or not it comports with the rules of polite society. It's right and wrong all at once, and it's kind of amazing." Alston complimented the writers' development of Sammi's character, writing "The idea behind Sammi's character is one the writers have honed and refined over nearly 60 episodes now, and they understand exactly how to build out such a character, especially when the material is in the hands of an actress like Bergl."

Marc Snetiker of Entertainment Weekly praised the Mickey and Debbie subplot, writing "The difference in Mickey and Debbie's approach to this murder is everything that makes this show so brilliant. Debbie is absolutely freaking out, while Mickey is cool and nonchalant about it—what's another bad deed to add to his list?" Allyson Johnson of The Young Folks gave the episode an 8 out of 10 rating and largely praised Fiona and Sean's storyline, writing "The really, truly great storyline was Sean and Fiona [whose] ending moments wrapped up the theme of season five in a way I didn't realized needed it until I saw it." Johnson also spoke highly of Noel Fisher's performance: "Fisher is fantastic and masters the comic and dramatic side of things that the show so often wishes Frank to handle."

David Crow of Den of Geek gave the episode a 3 star rating out of 5 and praised the Mickey/Debbie/Sammi subplot, writing "Sammi got treated like any other Gallagher or Milkovich (especially Milkovich) antagonist. It's about damn time... and pretty horrifying. It also made this penultimate episode of Shameless quite hilarious." Crow was critical over the resolution of Kevin and Veronica's storyline, calling their story arc the "biggest misfire" of the season, further adding "Shanola Hampton and Steve Howey deserve more screen time for all the wit and warmth they bring to a series that can be as brutally frigid as a Chicago winter. But having seen the season's likely endgame to a very contrived storyline, it's safe to say this was not the storyline they needed." Whitney Evans of TV Fanatic gave the episode a 4.5 star rating out of 5, and wrote, "With only one episode left this season, things are really starting to heat up in the Gallagher world."
