= Pimp's Paradise =

- Shameless episode
- Episode no.: Season 6 Episode 7
- Directed by: Peter Segal
- Written by: Dominique Morisseau
- Cinematography by: Kevin McKnight
- Editing by: Mark Sadlek
- Original release date: February 21, 2016
- Running time: 53 minutes

Guest appearances
- Dermot Mulroney as Sean Pierce (special guest star); Sherilyn Fenn as Queenie Slott (special guest star); Vanessa Bell Calloway as Carol Fisher; Ever Carradine as Erika Wexler; Nigel Gibbs as Pastor Daniels; Isidora Goreshter as Svetlana Milkovich; Jeff Pierre as Caleb; Alan Rosenberg as Professor Youens; Annie Sertich as Sorority Matron; Jaylen Barron as Dominique Winslow; Jim Hoffmaster as Kermit; Michael Patrick McGill as Tommy; Rebecca Metz as Melinda; Francesca P. Roberts as Ms. Taylor; Giorgia Whigham as Victoria

Episode chronology
← Previous "NSFW"	Next → "Be a Good Boy. Come For Grandma."
- Shameless season 6

"Pimp's Paradise" is the seventh episode of the sixth season of the American television comedy drama Shameless, an adaptation of the British series of the same name. It is the 67th overall episode of the series and was written by Dominique Morisseau and directed by Peter Segal. It originally aired on Showtime on February 21, 2016.

The series is set on the South Side of Chicago, Illinois, and depicts the poor, dysfunctional family of Frank Gallagher, a neglectful single father of six: Fiona, Phillip, Ian, Debbie, Carl, and Liam. He spends his days drunk, high, or in search of money, while his children need to learn to take care of themselves. In the episode, Carl takes over the Gallagher household, while Frank tries to prevent Queenie from leaving.

According to Nielsen Media Research, the episode was seen by an estimated 1.66 million household viewers and gained a 0.7 ratings share among adults aged 18–49. The episode received mixed reviews from critics, who were divided over the series' return to status quo.

== Plot ==
Carl (Ethan Cutkosky) has remodeled the house, now calling it his "crib." He has moved Ian (Cameron Monaghan) to Fiona's room, and Frank (William H. Macy) has taken another room to have sex with Queenie (Sherilyn Fenn). Fiona (Emmy Rossum) is still sleeping with Sean (Dermot Mulroney) at his house, but is unwilling to be kicked out of her own house.

Lip (Jeremy Allen White) loses his position as resident assistant. He believes it is due to his relationship with Helene, but is actually because of the wall that Amanda painted in his room. Furthermore, as this is considered an act of vandalism, he is also kicked out of the dorm room. Seeing his situation, a secretary, Victoria (Giorgia Whigham), gets him a job as a houseboy at a female sorority house, where he is given a room to sleep. As Ian debates over joining the firefighters, he accompanies Caleb (Jeff Pierre) to a wedding. Caleb's father is the pastor, and he has expressed his disdain for his son's homosexuality. During the reception, Ian and Caleb decide to display their relationship in front of everyone, upsetting the pastor.

With Erika (Ever Carradine) now in remission, the Wexlers dismiss Debbie (Emma Kenney) as the caretaker. Desperate to stay, she acts on Frank's advice in trying to win over Erika by performing sexual favors, with Carl's help. Debbie surprises Erika by trying to kiss her and almost performs a sexual act, but is interrupted when Frank sends a message confirming they can go back to the house. Frank and Queenie attend Chuckie's school after Chuckie writes a book report on Mein Kampf; instead of apologizing and disciplining, Frank criticizes the school for trying to censor his freedom of speech. Queenie considers leaving with Chuckie, but decides to stay and help Debbie with her pregnancy. Carl, out of guilt, visits the deceased kid's family to give them money for the funeral. When they turn it down, Carl leaves it next to a memorial.

A drunk Lip visits Helene's house, but no one answers. He goes on a tirade demanding that she speak with him, and throws away his bottle into the house when he receives no reply. Unable to convince Carl to change and disgusted by Frank's interaction with Queenie, Fiona accepts to move in with Sean. At school, Chuckie reads his book report to the entire class, leaving them shocked and aghast, but Frank proudly praises his paper.

== Production ==
The episode was written by Dominique Morisseau and directed by Peter Segal. It was Morisseau's first writing credit, and Segal's third directing credit.

== Reception ==
=== Viewers ===
In its original American broadcast, "Pimp's Paradise" was seen by an estimated 1.66 million household viewers with a 0.7 in the 18–49 demographics. This means that 0.7 percent of all households with televisions watched the episode. This was a slight increase in viewership from the previous episode, which was seen by an estimated 1.60 million household viewers with a 0.6 in the 18–49 demographics.

=== Critical reviews ===
"Pimp's Paradise" received mixed reviews from critics. Myles McNutt of The A.V. Club gave the episode a "C+" grade and wrote, "Shameless has never had universally great storylines: the show didn't always know how to integrate Sheila, Frank has been a drain more often than not, and there have been growing pains in each of the siblings’ stories along the way. But even with this week's reset button, I feel more disconnected from the show's stories now than maybe ever before in the show's run, which is not particularly hopeful heading into the back half of the season."

Leslie Pariseau of Vulture gave the episode a 3 out of 5 star rating and wrote ""Pimp's Paradise" is not necessarily dark, but it is heavy with melancholy for many reasons [...] It's also an enigma of an episode with seemingly few forces in place to drive the second half of the season. But, knowing the Gallagher clan, this gray calm is probably a warning bell. With tension brewing just below so many pot lids, it's certain to bubble over soon." Amanda Michelle Steiner of Entertainment Weekly wrote "“Pimp's Paradise” was a little all over the place, and it's hard to predict what may come next for the Gallaghers. However, with a shake-up like Fiona leaving the house and Queenie taking over at Frank's side, it's naïve to hope for anything good."

Allyson Johnson of The Young Folks gave the episode a 6 out of 10 rating and wrote "The episode is a mess, fitting for the season it's apart [sic] of and at the halfway mark it's difficult to comprehend what the actual purpose of the storylines will have been by the end of it." Paul Dailly of TV Fanatic gave the episode a 4 star rating out of 5, and wrote, ""Pimp's Paradise" was a solid installment that brought all the laughs. The show is taking these characters in an interesting direction and I can't wait to see what's next."
