= The F Word (Shameless) =

- Shameless episode
- Episode no.: Season 6 Episode 3
- Directed by: Nisha Ganatra
- Written by: Krista Vernoff
- Cinematography by: Kevin McKnight
- Editing by: Rob Bramwell
- Original release date: January 24, 2016
- Running time: 53 minutes

Guest appearances
- Dermot Mulroney as Sean Pierce; Steve Kazee as Gus Pfender; Jenica Bergere as Lisa #1; Mike Hagerty as Ron; Brent Jennings as Principal Monroe; José Julián as Joaquin; Peter Macon as Sergeant Winslow; Alan Rosenberg as Professor Youens; Will Sasso as Yanis; Jaylen Barron as Dominique Winslow; Lee Stark as Lisa #2

Episode chronology
← Previous "#AbortionRules"	Next → "Going Once, Going Twice"
- Shameless season 6

"The F Word" is the third episode of the sixth season of the American television comedy drama Shameless, an adaptation of the British series of the same name. It is the 63rd overall episode of the series and was written by executive producer Krista Vernoff and directed by Nisha Ganatra. It originally aired on Showtime on January 24, 2016.

The series is set on the South Side of Chicago, Illinois, and depicts the poor, dysfunctional family of Frank Gallagher, a neglectful single father of six: Fiona, Phillip, Ian, Debbie, Carl, and Liam. He spends his days drunk, high, or in search of money, while his children need to learn to take care of themselves. In the episode, Fiona debates on her new discovery, while Lip gets Ian a new job at college.

According to Nielsen Media Research, the episode was seen by an estimated 1.70 million household viewers and gained a 0.7 ratings share among adults aged 18–49. The episode received highly positive reviews from critics, with Emmy Rossum receiving particular praise for her performance.

== Plot ==
Fiona (Emmy Rossum) is annoyed to discover that Frank (William H. Macy) got an evicted family to hang out with them in the backyard. Fiona then reveals her pregnancy to Debbie (Emma Kenney) and makes an appointment so both can get abortions, but Debbie refuses and storms off. Frank (William H. Macy) runs into her, and he makes it clear he supports her decision to keep the baby.

Kevin (Steve Howey) and Veronica (Shanola Hampton) visit Yanis (Will Sasso) in the hospital, and are shocked to learn that he is paralyzed from the waist down. Yanis swears revenge against the person who sabotaged his motorcycle, believing it to be his lesbian neighbors. Fiona confides in Veronica her pregnancy, and while she is unsure who the father is, she does not care as she will abort. Lip (Jeremy Allen White) convinces Youens (Alan Rosenberg) in giving a janitor job to Ian (Cameron Monaghan). While Ian often hangs out and drinks with Lip, he is displeased with the fact that Lip is faring better than him. Carl (Ethan Cutkosky) continues selling guns in the school, and even the teachers and principal ask him for guns. He becomes interested in a girl, Dominique, but she constantly rejects him for his lifestyle.

When Debbie calls her out, Fiona decides to visit Gus (Steve Kazee) to apologize for her actions. Gus accepts her and invites her to listen to her new performance at a bar. However, the song is titled "The F Word" and involves Gus insulting Fiona for cheating on him, and she leaves humiliated with Sean (Dermot Mulroney). Per Debbie's request, Frank gets most of the family to stage an intervention for Fiona and convince her not to abort, but she does not listen. Debbie then suggests a truce; she will support Fiona's decision to abort, if she supports Debbie's decision to keep the baby. Fiona makes it clear that if she chooses to keep the baby, Fiona will not help her in anything as Debbie will not live in the house then. When Sean arrives, she reveals her pregnancy.

Lip tries to help Ian in cleaning a post-party hallway, but Ian turns aggressive and they engage into a fight, culminating with Ian quitting his job. That night, Fiona is dismayed when she returns home and discovers an eviction notice. As he walks on the street, Ian witnesses a car crash; one driver runs away while the other, a woman, is knocked unconscious as her car engulfs in flames. Ian hurriedly rescues the woman, but loses consciousness. Later, he wakes up when a team of paramedics provide him oxygen.

== Production ==
The episode was written by executive producer Krista Vernoff and directed by Nisha Ganatra. It was Vernoff's fifth writing credit, and Ganatra's first directing credit.

== Reception ==
=== Viewers ===
In its original American broadcast, "The F Word" was seen by an estimated 1.70 million household viewers with a 0.7 in the 18–49 demographics. This means that 0.7 percent of all households with televisions watched the episode. This was a slight increase in viewership from the previous episode, which was seen by an estimated 1.64 million household viewers with a 0.7 in the 18–49 demographics.

=== Critical reviews ===
"The F Word" received highly positive reviews from critics. Myles McNutt of The A.V. Club gave the episode a "B+" grade and wrote, "with the Gallaghers receiving an eviction notice, the gentrification storyline is creeping closer to becoming a major plot point, reaffirming "The F Word" as the end of season six's prologue. There may have been a few plot twists too many, and there might still be some lingering plot threads that are more unpleasant than funny or meaningful, but at the very least we got a glimpse of the kind of resonant storytelling that has sustained Shameless in the past. Now we shall see if it can be sustained in the future."

Leslie Pariseau of Vulture gave the episode a 3 out of 5 star rating and wrote ""The F Word" does build toward a very big twist: The Gallaghers find an eviction notice on their door. In an episode that finds everyone sick of everyone else, it seems the South Side is sick of this twisted family, too." Hollis Andrews of The New York Observer wrote "The proverbial ca-ca is damn near reaching the fan for the Gallagher's this week. I mean, their fan is already covered in the stuff, but it seems like more is always on the way."

Amanda Michelle Steiner of Entertainment Weekly wrote "if I know anything about television, it's Ian's future love interest set to make him rethink his life and choices. Fingers crossed that whatever comes next propels Ian to better choices made by himself, and that he doesn't become dependent on another person to make those choices for him." Allyson Johnson of The Young Folks gave the episode an 8.5 out of 10 rating and wrote "Wonderfully shot and genuinely moving, it's a move the show hasn't done before and I'm intrigued by how the Gallaghers, Fiona mainly, is going to work her way out of this one."

David Crow of Den of Geek gave the episode a 3.5 star rating out of 5 and wrote, "I don't think anyone is supposed to have time to laugh too hard. Not with gentrification finally joining the rest of the "A" storylines since Fiona got an eviction notice slapped on her front door. That is never a good harbinger. But we'll find out how that will effect the Gallagher clan as Fi and Debs' Cold War inches closer to the nuclear option next week on Shameless." Paul Dailly of TV Fanatic gave the episode a 4.5 star rating out of 5, and wrote, "another solid episode of this Showtime drama. The show never stops to catch a breath and life for these characters will never be smooth."

=== Accolades ===
TVLine named Emmy Rossum as the "Performer of the Week" for the week of January 30, 2016, for her performance in the episode. The site wrote, "Sunday's episode of Shameless was titled "The F Word" after a scathing song written by Fiona's estranged husband, Gus. While "The F Word" stood for nothing nice between the ex-lovers, Emmy Rossum's emotional display during the hour was rated F for fantastic. Though we've come to expect that kind of stellar work from the actress, watching her nail a challenging scene still leaves us in awe."
