= Be a Good Boy. Come For Grandma. =

- Shameless episode
- Episode no.: Season 6 Episode 8
- Directed by: Iain B. MacDonald
- Written by: Nancy M. Pimental
- Cinematography by: Kevin McKnight
- Editing by: Rob Bramwell
- Original release date: March 6, 2016
- Running time: 57 minutes

Guest appearances
- Dermot Mulroney as Sean Pierce (special guest star); Sherilyn Fenn as Queenie Slott (special guest star); Brett Davern as Larry; Rick Fox as Gareth; Jeff Pierre as Caleb; Derek Ray as Gregory; Alan Rosenberg as Professor Youens; Marcus Ajose as Lamar; Reed Emmons as Will Pierce; Na'im Lynn as Gangbanger

Episode chronology
← Previous "Pimp's Paradise"	Next → "A Yurt of One's Own"
- Shameless season 6

"Be a Good Boy. Come For Grandma." is the eighth episode of the sixth season of the American television comedy drama Shameless, an adaptation of the British series of the same name. It is the 68th overall episode of the series and was written by Nancy M. Pimental and directed by Iain B. MacDonald. It originally aired on Showtime on March 6, 2016.

The series is set on the South Side of Chicago, Illinois, and depicts the poor, dysfunctional family of Frank Gallagher, a neglectful single father of six: Fiona, Phillip, Ian, Debbie, Carl, and Liam. He spends his days drunk, high, or in search of money, while his children need to learn to take care of themselves. In the episode, Frank covers Carl in a drug shipment, while Fiona tries to bond with Sean's son.

According to Nielsen Media Research, the episode was seen by an estimated 1.50 million household viewers and gained a 0.6 ratings share among adults aged 18–49. The episode received positive reviews from critics, who praised the episode's tone and performances.

== Plot ==
Queenie (Sherilyn Fenn) has established herself in the house, forcing the Gallaghers to comply with her rules. Carl (Ethan Cutkosky) is visited by his partner-in-crime Lamar (Marcus Ajose), who wants him to run a new shipment. When Carl states he is done with his criminal lifestyle, Lamar beats him and warns him if he does not follow the instructions.

While staying with Sean (Dermot Mulroney), Fiona (Emmy Rossum) tries to bond with his son Will, but he is uninterested. Lip (Jeremy Allen White) experiences erectile dysfunction, discovering that only the naked picture of Helene can excite him. While buying baby accessories, Debbie (Emma Kenney) is approached by a man named Larry (Brett Davern), and they take a liking to each other. Larry compliments her and offers to help her in anything, delighting her. However, Debbie is disgusted when she finds him at a yoga class with another pregnant woman, realizing that he is only interested in her because of his pregnancy fetishism.

Carl asks Frank (William H. Macy) for help in the shipment, so Frank decides to do the job for him. He pays a man, Gareth (Rick Fox), to serve as a menacing henchman to get payments from other partners. Frank then meets with Lamar, who is upset that Carl did not perform his duties. Lamar then orders Frank to transport a bag of cocaine to Indiana, threatening to castrate him if he fails. Frank meets with Gareth to accompany him, but they end up using some of the cocaine instead, replacing it with powdered laxative. Ian (Cameron Monaghan) goes out with Caleb (Jeff Pierre) and his friends. Ian and Caleb then share their respective secrets; Ian reveals his bipolar disorder, while Caleb reveals he is HIV-positive. Nevertheless, they agree to have safe sex.

Lip visits the house, where Queenie listens to his problems. She gives him a foot rub, causing him to have finally overcome his dysfunction. Fiona discovers about Carl's injury, and he opens up that the kid's murder prompted him to abandon his drug dealing lifestyle. To help him, Sean accompanies Carl in meeting G-Dog (Stephen Rider) and negotiate ending his partnership. G-Dog agrees, but Sean and Carl are forced to give up their clothes and car. When they reach Sean's apartment, Sean is shocked when he finds Will playing with Carl's gun. Sean angrily scolds Fiona, as he could lose his visitation rights. Fiona gets rid of all of Carl's guns. Frank and Gareth return from Indiana, after having consumed all the cocaine with Gareth's friends. When Gareth leaves, Lamar and his henchmen arrive to confront Frank over the laxative, causing him to flee.

== Production ==
The episode was written by executive producer Nancy M. Pimental and directed by Iain B. MacDonald. It was Pimental's 15th writing credit, and MacDonald's second directing credit.

== Reception ==
=== Viewers ===
In its original American broadcast, "Be a Good Boy. Come For Grandma." was seen by an estimated 1.50 million household viewers with a 0.6 in the 18–49 demographics. This means that 0.6 percent of all households with televisions watched the episode. This was a 10% decrease in viewership from the previous episode, which was seen by an estimated 1.66 million household viewers with a 0.7 in the 18–49 demographics.

=== Critical reviews ===
"Be a Good Boy. Come For Grandma." received positive reviews from critics. Myles McNutt of The A.V. Club gave the episode a "B–" grade and wrote, "While not a bad episode of the show, this one never entirely reconciles the breezy feel of some stories with the darker edge to Carl's situation or that image of Will brandishing a gun. That, again, is a big part of how Shameless understands its identity, but it makes for an episode that neither pulls the season together or pushes it in a new direction — it just kind of kicks the can down the street until next week."

Leslie Pariseau of Vulture gave the episode a perfect 5 out of 5 star rating and wrote "This week's shudder-inducing episode is Shameless at its very best, satisfyingly in sync with the ways the Gallaghers' daily routines run in and out of one another, from Queenie's organic breakfast on the South Side, to Lip's morning erectile dysfunction at Chicago Polytechnic, or Frank's newly minted cornrows, to Carl's disavowal of drug running. It's still difficult to tell what the season is building toward, but in the meantime, it's certainly entertaining."

Amanda Michelle Steiner of Entertainment Weekly wrote "The episode title for this week's Shameless is the most horrifying thing I've ever read. Meanwhile, the most horrifying thing I've ever seen and heard is Queenie actually saying that to Lip, which changed me. I will never be the same." Paul Dailly of TV Fanatic gave the episode a 4 star rating out of 5, and wrote, ""Be a Good Boy. Come for Grandma" was a funny installment, but the relationship drama for some of the characters is beginning to wear a little thin and it would make more sense to write more satisfying arcs for our favorite characters than have them being defined by relationships."
