= The Ride (2018 film) =

2018 semi-biographical film

The Ride is a 2018 independent film directed by Alex Ranarivelo and written by him, Hadeel Reda and J.R. Reher. It is based on the true story of Scottish BMX rider John Buultjens, a troubled boy from a Neo-Nazi family who is fostered by an interracial couple.

The film stars Shane Graham, Ludacris and Sasha Alexander. John Buultjens plays a version of his own abusive biological father.

It was released in North America in 2020 on Amazon Prime.
