= Michael McMillian =

American actor and writer

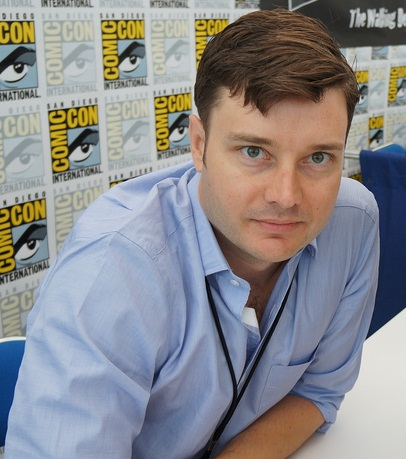
- McMillian in 2013
- Education: Carnegie Mellon University (BFA)
- Occupations: Actor; writer
- Years active: 1999–present

Michael McMillian is an American actor and writer, known for his roles as Henry Gibson on What I Like About You, Steve Newlin on the HBO series True Blood, Owen on Hot in Cleveland and Tim in Crazy Ex-Girlfriend. McMillian is also the creator and writer of a comic book, Lucid.

== Early years ==
McMillian grew up in Olathe, Kansas, attending Blue Valley Northwest High School through his second year. In 1995, McMillian transferred to Interlochen Arts Academy, where he studied acting, playwriting and screenwriting. He attended Carnegie Mellon University, where he was signed by an agent after a senior class showcase.

== Career ==
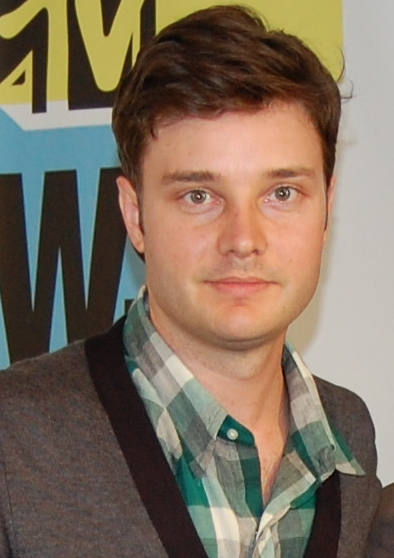
McMillian in 2010

McMillian has acted in films and television shows and has contributed voice work to a number of video games. He garnered attention for his starring role in the independent film Dorian Blues, playing a young man struggling with his family's reaction to his coming out. He played Greg in the original pilot episode of Luis, but gave up the series in favor of making his then-recurring What I Like About You character, Henry Gibson, a regular. McMillian penned an episode during the third season of What I Like About You. He played the role of Harper in the TNT's Saved. His most recent film role was in Imagine That.

In 2009, McMillian wrote and created the magic-themed comic book mini-series, Lucid, for Before the Door Pictures and Archaia Studios Press. He is also co-writer of the second True Blood comic book series produced by IDW publishing and HBO. In 2010, he appeared opposite star Hilary Duff in the TV movie Beauty & the Briefcase, based on the novel Diary of a Working Girl by Daniella Brodsky.

== Filmography ==
=== Film ===
Year	Title	Role	Notes
1999	Out of Courage 2: Out for Vengeance	Kelly O'Rourke	Short film
2004	Dorian Blues	Dorian Lagatos	
2007	The Hills Have Eyes 2	PFC David 'Napoleon' Napoli	
2008	Dimples	Henry	
2009	Imagine That	Brock Pressman	
2009	Glock	Smith & Wesson	Short film
2010	Half-Dragon Sanchez	Michael Brandtley	
2011	Happy Hour	Greg	Short film
2013	Banshee Chapter	James Hirsch	
2016	The Tiger Hunter	Winston	
2016	Man Rots from the Head	Sheldon	Short film
2017	The Arrival	Arthur	Short film

=== Television ===
Year	Title	Role	Notes
2002	8 Simple Rules	Guy	Episode: "Son-in-Law"
2002	Firefly	Young Hopeful	Episode: "Shindig"
2003	Miracles	Kevin Kettridge	Episode: "The Ghost"
2003–2005	What I Like About You	Henry Gibson	Recurring role (season 1), main (season 2), guest (season 3), writer "Girls Gone Wild"
2005	Veronica Mars	Pete Comiscky	Episode: "Weapons of Class Destruction"
2005	Without a Trace	Paul Cartwright	Episode: "Lost Time"
2005	Marsha Potter Gets a Life		TV film
2006	Big Love	Chad	Episode: "A Barbecue for Betty"
2006	Saved	Harper Sims	Main role
2007	Scrubs	Patrick	Episode: "My Conventional Wisdom"
2008	Small Town News	Daniel	TV film
2008–2014	True Blood	Steve Newlin	Recurring role (season 1), Main (season 2, 5–6), Special Guest (Seasons 3-4, 7)
2009	The Mentalist	Drew Abner	Episode: "Red Scare"
2009	Rockville CA	Brett	Episodes: "Are You Single", "Brett", "Lost in the Supermarket", "Yes, Yes, No, Yes"
2010	Beauty & the Briefcase	Tom Reinhart	TV film
2010	The Whole Truth	Walter Williams	Episode: "Judicial Discretion"
2010	The Further Adventures of Edmund and Pablo	James	TV short
2011	CSI: NY	Neal Cooper	Episode: "Party Down"
2011	Futurestates	Dr. Slate	Episode: "Beholder"
2011	Love Bites		Episode: "Keep on Truckin'"
2011–2015	Hot in Cleveland	Owen	Recurring role (seasons 2–6)
2012	House of Lies	Paul	Episode: "Utah"
2012	Emily Owens, M.D.	Blake	Episode: "Emily and... the Good and the Bad"
2015	Major Crimes	Les Dickerhoof	Episode: "Reality Check"
2015–16	Silicon Valley	Aaron 'Double A' Anderson	Episodes: "Homicide", "Bachmanity Insanity"
2015–2019	Crazy Ex-Girlfriend	Tim	Recurring role
2016	Shameless	Tyler	Episodes: "Going Once, Going Twice", "Refugees"
2016	Hawaii Five-0	Chris Dalton	Episode: "Waiwai"
2016	NCIS	David Kemmons	Episode: "Love Boat"
2017	Micah the Asshole Ghost	James	TV film
2018	NCIS: Los Angeles	Donald Jenkins	Episode: "Reentry"
2023	9-1-1: Lone Star	Vic	Episode: "A House Divided"

=== Video games ===
Year	Title	Voice role	Notes
2004	Men of Valor	Hess	
2004	Fight Club	Angel Face Ricky	
2005	SWAT 4	Male Hostage #1 / Phone Caller #1	
2012	Gangster Vegas	Various	
