= Presidio Med =

2002 American medical drama TV series

- Genre: Medical drama
- Created by: John Wells; Lydia Woodward
- Starring: Dana Delany; Oded Fehr; Anna Deavere Smith; Paul Blackthorne; Julianne Nicholson; Sasha Alexander; Blythe Danner
- Composer: Martin Davich
- Country of origin: United States
- Original language: English
- No. of seasons: 1
- No. of episodes: 14 (3 unaired)

Production
- Executive producers: Christopher Chulack; John Wells; Lydia Woodward
- Producers: Michael Hissrich; Chris Mundy; Nell Scovell; Andrew Stearn; George Young; Jonathan Zurer
- Cinematography: Anthony R. Palmieri; Kevin Thompson
- Camera setup: Single-camera
- Running time: 44 minutes
- Production companies: Lydia Woodward Productions; John Wells Productions; Warner Bros. Television

Original release
- Network: CBS
- Release: September 24, 2002 – January 24, 2003

Presidio Med is an American medical drama television series created by John Wells and Lydia Woodward (who also executive produced NBC's ER). It aired on CBS from September 24, 2002 to January 24, 2003. The series centers on a San Francisco hospital.

== Premise ==
Bucking the recent medical trend toward impersonal care, the doctors at Presidio Medical Group set bureaucracy aside and put their patients first, forming trusting, long-term relationships. Although their personalities sometimes clash, all of the doctors seek the best possible care for their patients.

== Cast ==
- Dana Delany as Dr. Rae Brennan
- Sasha Alexander as Dr. Jackie Colette
- Paul Blackthorne as Dr. Matt Slingerland
- Blythe Danner as Dr. Harrient Lanning
- Anna Deavere Smith as Dr. Letty Jordan
- Oded Fehr as Dr. Nicolas Kokoris
- Julianne Nicholson as Dr. Jules Keating
- Jennifer Siebel as Cyndy Lloyd

== Awards and nominations ==
In 2004, actress Hallie Kate Eisenberg was nominated for a Young Artist Award for Best Performance in a TV Series in the category Guest Starring Young Actress for her performance as Grace Rothman in the episode "With Grace".

== Episodes ==
No.	Title	Directed by	Written by	Original release date	Prod. code	US viewers (millions)	Ratings (rating/share)
1	"This Baby's Gonna Fly"	Christopher Chulack	N/A	September 24, 2002	475178	8.7	6.3/10
Dr. Lanning and Dr. Keating team up to save a newborn baby in distress. Meanwhile, Dr. Keating must grapple with a medical scare that could affect her own ability to have children. Dr. Brennan returns from her yearly foreign medical mission, known as "Doctors Without Borders," where she has been having an affair with a Greek physician. Upon her return, she must help a man deal with the impending death of his father, who has cancer. Dr. Slingerland enlists Dr. Jordan to help him convince a zealous high school football coach of his urgent need for heart surgery. At the same time, Dr. Colette brazenly begins her new job by bullying an HMO to approve surgery for an elderly woman.
2	"Second Chance"	Christopher Chulack	Lydia Woodward	September 25, 2002	175701	12.8	9.0/15
Dr. Jackie Collette struggles with her reluctance to treating burn victims when a critically burned firefighter needs her help. Meanwhile, Dr. Brennan refocuses on making her marriage work and attempts to make it easier by asking Dr. Kokoris to leave Presidio Med and return to Greece.
3	"Do No Harm"	Lesli Linka Glatter	John Wells III	October 2, 2002	175702	7.9	5.5/9
Dr. Lanning and Dr. Keating work together to help a troubled young girl who asks to be sterilized. Meanwhile, Dr. Jordan and her physician husband, Dr. Roback, argue over how to get a mother to take her obese boy's weight issue seriously.
4	"When Approaching a Let-Go"	Nelson McCormick	Joseph Dougherty	October 9, 2002	175703	7.2	5.1/9
Drs. Slingerland and Jordan diagnosis a cable car worker with Carpal Tunnel Syndrome and a heart problem, Dr. Keating looks for doctors who will fertilize her eggs, and Dr. Colette learns that the fire fighter she treated for burns is in love with her.
5	"Secrets"	Charles Hald	Nell Scovell	October 16, 2002	175704	7.0	5.2/9
Rae tries to get the parents of a 10-year-old boy to tell him he has Sickle-Cell Anemia.
6	"Milagros"	Gloria Muzio	Lydia Woodward	October 23, 2002	175705	7.1	5.2/9
Two doctors fight over whether they should remove the leg of a diabetic patient.
7	"Once Upon a Family"	Christopher Chulack	Chris Mundy	October 30, 2002	175706	7.4	5.4/9
Letty and Matt work together on a patient, Dean Carvell, who suffers severe heart problems due to a previous car accident. Dean's lover and son clash over his treatment, which doesn't seem successful. Finally, Dean must choose whether or not to continue being resuscitated. Meanwhile, Harriet unites a wealthy, infertile 42-year-old woman who desperately wants a child with a troubled, pregnant teenager, Ellen O'Neal, who wants to give up her baby for adoption. But problems with Ellen's father and teenage boyfriend could jeopardize the transaction. After suspecting parental abuse when she sees a boy's bruises, Jules later questions her decision to call Children's Protective Services. And each of the Presidio Med doctors passes an obnoxious chronic patient, Francis Weinod, on to the next unwitting physician.
8	"Pick Your Battles"	Laura Innes	Joseph Dougherty	November 13, 2002	175707	5.8	4.0/7
Dr. Kokoris operates on another patient; A fitness instructor complains of muscle problems and learns he has something different.
9	"Suffer Unto Me the Children..."	Christopher Chulack	John Wells III	January 17, 2003	175708	7.1	4.7/8
Patients delivering prematurely flood the hospital.
10	"With Grace"	Lesli Linka Glatter	Zoanne Clack, Karyn Usher & Lisa Zwerling	January 22, 2003	175709	7.4	5.0/8
Rae diagnoses Grace Rothman, a spirited nine-year-old girl with leukaemia. Initially confident that she can heal Grace, Rae feels like a failure when the treatments don't work as planned. Meanwhile, as her marriage to Sean continues to deteriorate, Rae finds herself more attracted to Kokoris.
11	"Breathless"	Jack Bender	Lydia Woodward & Joseph Dougherty	January 24, 2003	175711	6.1	4.6/7
A teenage boy is treated after falling off the roof, in what is suspected as a self inflicted injury, after he reveals that he is gay. And the life of a patient on the waiting list for new lungs is explored.
12	"Good Question"	Dianne Houston	Zoanne Clack, Karyn Usher & Lisa Zwerling	Unaired	175710	N/A	TBA
To help a healthy woman become pregnant by her HIV-infected husband, Harriet suggests an illegal new procedure called sperm washing in order to reduce the patient's risk of infection. Harriet refuses to relent when hospital administrators forbid her from performing the unlawful procedure. Meanwhile, Letty's patient, a middle-aged man, dies during an uncomplicated heart surgery. Although the deceased's Orthodox Jewish father refuses to approve an autopsy due to the family's religious convictions, Letty requests a court order so she can determine what went wrong. Also, Jackie discovers that a patient desiring a tummy tuck suffers from an eating disorder.
13	"Best of Enemies"	Nelson McCormick	N/A	Unaired	175712	N/A	TBA
Letty's strong camaraderie with the hospital's driven attending surgeon, Dr Teresa Howland (recurring guest star Christine Baranski), is tested when Howland displays signs of stress. As Howland's symptoms worsen - and she confides a painful personal tragedy - Letty suspects that her friend's problem may be more serious than she is admitting. Meanwhile, Jackie is irritated by a handsome young intern, Anthony Bolesky, until she realizes that the brash but capable doctor reminds her of herself. And Harriet is amused by Adrian Ramsey (Tom Arnold - "Roseanne," "True Lies"), who donated sperm 18 years ago and wants to meet the now grown children he fathered.
14	"Cascading"	Peter Ellis	N/A	Unaired	175713	N/A	TBA
Dr Collette's best friend returns to San Francisco and learns that there is a strong chance her cancer is active, with a very slight presence of a tumor. Meanwhile Jackie's relationship with Dr. Bolesky is taken to the next level.
