= Jenica Bergere =

American actress

- Born: Jenica Angell Berger; July 4, 1974 (age 51)
- Education: Palm Desert Middle School; Palm Desert High School
- Occupation: Actress
- Years active: 1995–present
- Known for: Men Behaving Badly
- Spouse(s): Josh Jackson (m. circa 2000)
- Children: 3

Jenica Angell Berger (born July 4, 1974), known professionally as Jenica Bergere, is an American actress known for her roles in Men Behaving Badly, Trophy Wife, Bosch, The Drew Carey Show, The Faculty, and others. Bergere has also appeared in the films Safety Not Guaranteed, And Then There Was Eve, Psycho Beach Party, and others.

== Early life and career ==
Born exactly two years before the nation's bicentennial, Bergere was the first-born child of Helen H. (née Caldwell) and jazz drummer John Angell Berger, aka John Bergere. She attended Palm Desert Middle School and Palm Desert High, (class of 1992), where she studied theater with Sherry Wollenberg, and, in November 1991, appeared in a production of Arthur Miller's The Crucible, as Mercy Lewis.

== Personal life ==
Since 1997, Bergere has lived with L.A.-based chef, Josh Jackson. They soon married and have since raised three daughters.

== Filmography ==
=== Film ===
Year	Title	Role	Notes
1996	White Lipstick	Toni Gillette	
1999	Splendor	Model #1	
1999	Love Happens	Amy	
2000	Psycho Beach Party	Cookie	
2000	Dancing in September	Writer One	
2001	Rat Race	Hotel Clerk	
2001	I Shaved My Legs for This	Blythe	
2005	Yours, Mine & Ours	Claudia	
2006	Forgiving the Franklins	Christian Parent's Association Woman	
2007	If I Had Known I Was a Genius	Bitchy Young Woman	
2007	Live!	Southern Accent Pitcher	
2008	Superhero Movie	"Mr. Landers!"	
2010	Barry Munday	Janice (Midwife)	
2011	Balls to the Wall	Candy Lane	
2011	Judy Moody and the Not Bummer Summer	Rocky's Mom	
2011	Coming & Going	Mrs. Jensen	
2012	Safety Not Guaranteed	Liz	
2012	The Babymakers	Officer Kanani	
2012	Knife Fight	Molly	
2012	Least Among Saints	Jeremy's Mom	
2012	Love or Whatever	Melissa	
2012	Chasing Mavericks	Zeuf	
2012	The Motel Life	Polly Flynn	
2012	Shadow Witness	Nancy Hodel	
2013	A Single Shot	Colette	
2013	Screwed	Meredith	
2014	Supremacy	Gerardi	
2014	All Stars	Jenica Harmon	
2015	Come Simi	Jenica	
2016	Losing in Love	Sandy	
2016	Tattoo You	Tammy	
2016	Love Is All You Need?	Karen Curtis	
2016	Mr. Church	Nurse	
2017	Swing State	Sheila Browning	
2017	Quality Problems	Paula	
2017	And Then There Was Eve	Robyn	
2017	This Is Meg	Ruby	
2018	Gloria Bell	Laughing Instructor	
2018	Good Girls Get High	Linda	
2018	Ralph Breaks the Internet	Additional voices	
2021	The Starling	Pastor Veronica	

=== Television ===
Year	Title	Role	Notes
1995	The Faculty		Television film
1996	The Faculty	Amanda Duvall	13 episodes
1996–1997	Ink	Donna French	22 episodes
1997	The Larry Sanders Show	Jessica	Episode: "Pain Equals Funny"
1997	Men Behaving Badly	Katie	12 episodes
1998	Caroline in the City	Kristin	Episode: "Caroline and the Quiz Show"
1998	Seinfeld	Leslie	Episode: "The Puerto Rican Day"
1998	Conrad Bloom	Nina Bloom	Episode: "Pilot"
1998	Malcolm & Eddie	Natalie	Episode: "Silenced Partner"
1998–1999	The Drew Carey Show	Sharon Bridges	12 episodes
1999	Road Rage	Nina	Television film
2000	The Expendables	Sue	Television film
2000	Felicity	Patty	Episode: "A Good Egg"
2001	Ally McBeal	Jessica Pipp	Episode: "Mr. Bo"
2001	Stranger Inside	Teresa	Television film
2001	Nikki	Beth	3 episodes
2001	On the Edge	Sally	Television film
2002	Becker	Connie	Episode: "Talking Points"
2002	They Shoot Divas, Don't They?	Maggie	Television film
2002	3-South	Various	Episode: "The Freshmen"
2002	The King of Queens	Elly	Episode: "Connect Four"
2002	Touched by an Angel	Hannah	Episode: "Remembering Me: Part 2"
2004	Medical Investigation	Renee	Episode: "Coming Home"
2005	Inconceivable	Anita	Episode: "To Surrogate, with Love"
2005	Crazy	Jessica	Television film
2006	CSI: Crime Scene Investigation	Concierge	Episode: "Poppin' Tags"
2006	Windfall	Judy	Episode: "Truth Be Told"
2007	Without a Trace	Roxi	Episode: "Where and Why"
2007	Union Jackass	Elizabeth	Episode: "Pilot"
2009	Dollhouse	Jessie	Episode: "Echoes"
2009	Wizards of Waverly Place	Mother Nature	Episode: "Don't Rain on Justin's Parade - Earth"
2009	Raising the Bar	Lead Hockey Mom	Episode: "Hair Apparent"
2009	Saving Grace	Mary Jones	Episode: "Popcorn"
2009, 2011	Modern Family	Janet / Soccer Mom	Episodes: "Pilot"; "Phil on Wire"
2010	Bones	Officer Becky Conway	Episode: "The Death of the Queen Bee"
2011	Friends with Benefits	Mary Resnick	Episode: "The Benefit of the Mute Button"
2013	The Mentalist	Holly Preston	Episode: "The Red Barn"
2013	You and Your Fucking Coffee	Karen	Episode: "Houseguest"
2013–2014	Trophy Wife	Helene	4 episodes
2015	Bosch	Sheila Delacroix	4 episodes
2015–2016	Shameless	Lisa	6 episodes
2016	Teachers	Rita	Episode: "Sex Ed"
2018	Alexa & Katie	Coach Winters	3 episodes
2019	Grey's Anatomy	Dr. Kimberly Thompson	Episode: "I Walk The Line"
2019	9-1-1	Nina	Episode: "Ocean's 9-1-1"
2019	The Conners	Officer Sharpe	Episode: "Lanford, Toilet of Sin"
2021	Calls	Mom	Episode: "Mom"
2021	Mr. Corman	Doctor's Office Receptionist	Episode: "Don't Panic"
2021	Immoral Compass	Karen	Episode: "Part 5: Hypocrisy"
2026	High Potential	Leona Meyers	Episode: "The Faust and the Furious"
