= Michael Reilly Burke =

American actor (born 1964)

- Born: Michael Reilly Burke; June 27, 1964 (age 62); Marin County, California, U.S.
- Education: Marin Catholic High School
- Occupation: Actor
- Years active: 1993–present
- Spouse: Kayren Butler (m. 2008)
- Children: 2
- Awards: Fangoria Chainsaw Award
- Website: michaelreillyburke.com

Michael Reilly Burke (born June 27, 1964) is an American actor. He played Rex Van De Kamp on the unaired pilot of Desperate Housewives. Steven Culp replaced him before the pilot aired. He also appeared in The WB series Charmed in the episode "Heartbreak City". He is a 1982 graduate of Marin Catholic High School in Marin County, California.

The lone starring role of his career has been as serial killer Ted Bundy in the 2002 film Ted Bundy. He played the role of Officer Kevin Lund on ABC Family's Lincoln Heights. He has guest starred on various Star Trek series and CSIs.

== Early life ==
Michael Reilly Burke was born on June 27, 1964, in Marin County, California, US. He graduated from Marin Catholic High School in Marin County, California in 1982.

== Filmography ==
=== Film ===
Year	Title	Role	Notes
1994	Foreign Student	Harrison	
1996	Love Always	Mark Righetti	
1996	Mars Attacks!	GNN Reporter	
1996	Ransom	Best Boy Electric	
2001	Octopus 2: River of Fear	Nick Hartfield	
2002	Ted Bundy	Ted Bundy	
2006	Death of a President	Robert H. Maguire	
2009	The Collector	Michael Chase	
2014	The Big Bad City	Detective Kelly	
2015	My All American	Fred Steinmark	
2018	Slender Man	Hallie's Dad	
2018	Monster Party	Mr. Clapton	
2018	Vice	David Gribbin	

=== Television ===
Year	Title	Role	Notes
1993	Star Trek: The Next Generation	Goval	Episode: "Descent, Part II"
1993	Melrose Place	Fred Linquist	Episode: "Flirting with Disaster"
1993	Picket Fences	David Beale	Episode: "Under the Influence"
1994	seaQuest DSV	Commando #7	Episode: "Nothing But the Truth"
1994	Star Trek: Deep Space Nine	Hogue	Episode: "Profit and Loss"
1994	Dead at 21	Tavis Farrell	Episode: "Life During Wartime"
1994	Red Shoe Diaries	Reluctant Boyfriend	Episode: "The Last Motel"
1995	Vanishing Son	Lane Ellis	Episode: "Win, Place or Dead"
1995	Earth 2	Future Ulysses	Episode: "The Boy Who Would Be Terrian King"
1995	Terror in the Shadows	Customer #1	TV movie
1995–1996	Space: Above and Beyond	A silicate / Capt. John Oakes	2 episodes
1995, 2003	NYPD Blue	Harry Benson / James Carlin	5 episodes
1996	Diagnosis: Murder	Kyle Harding	Episode: "The Pressure to Murder"
1996	Bermuda Triangle	Michael	TV movie
1996	Central Park West	Tyler Brock	3 episodes
1997	Childhood Sweetheart?	Greg Davis	TV movie
1997	Orleans	Jesse Charbonnet	8 episodes
1997	Promised Land	Steve Dunbar	Episode: "To Everything a Season"
1998	Beverly Hills, 90210	Jeff Stockmann	4 episodes
1998	Creature	Adam Puckett	2 episodes
1998	The Pretender	Harold 'Harry' Kincaid	Episode: "Someone to Trust"
1998	Ally McBeal	Mr. Wells	Episode: "You Never Can Tell"
1999	Party of Five	A.D.A. Fellows	Episode: "Fillmore Street"
1999	Poltergeist: The Legacy	Jeffrey Sandor	2 episodes
1999	Providence	Brady Pullman	6 episodes
2000	Charmed	Cupid	Episode: "Heartbreak City"
2000	Family Law	Matt McClendon	Episode: "Going Home"
2001	First Years	Dan Gaynor	Episode: "The First Thing You Do..."
2001	The Beast	Jeremy Anglade	4 episodes
2001	Dead Last	Officer Carl Vard	Episode: "He Who Smelt It"
2001, 2004	JAG	Lt. Cmdr. Jay Pagano / Commander Adam Kohler	2 episodes
2002	For the People	Jackson Rose	Episode: "Pilot"
2002	Presidio Med		Episode: "Milagros"
2003	War Stories	Coulter	TV movie
2003	Cold Case	Eric Witley	Episode: "Look Again"
2004	The O.C.	Tom Willington	Episode: "The Links"
2004	The Practice	Detective Kevin McCarley	3 episodes
2004	CSI: Crime Scene Investigation	Bailey Coombs	Episode: "Bloodlines"
2004	Desperate Housewives	Neighbor at Fire (uncredited) / Wake Attendee	Episode: "Pilot"
2004	Star Trek: Enterprise	Koss	3 episodes
2004	NYPD 2069	Harlan Kroger	TV movie
2005	Crossing Jordan	FBI Agent Sullivan	Episode: "A Stranger Among Us"
2005	The West Wing	Bill Brewer	Episode: "La Palabra"
2005	Tru Calling	Russell Marks	Episode: "'Twas the Night Before Christmas... Again"
2005	NCIS	Frank Connell	Episode: "Honor Code"
2006	Without a Trace	Don McGraw	Episode: "Patient X"
2006	CSI: Miami	Daniel Wells	Episode: "Death Eminent"
2006	Heroes	Detective	Episode: "Chapter Five 'Hiros'"
2007	Close to Home	Carl Middleton	Episode: "Barren"
2007	24	Bruce Carson	3 episodes
2007	Shark	Stuart Buckner	Episode: "Strange Bedfellows"
2007	Ghost Whisperer	William Taylor	Episode: "Holiday Spirit"
2007	Company Man	Ted Gaines	TV movie
2007	The Cure	Frank Carter	TV movie
2007–2008	Lincoln Heights	Kevin Lund	33 episodes
2009	Eli Stone	Clayton Wells	Episode: "Tailspin"
2009	Castle	Frank Nesbit	Episode: "Hell Hath No Fury"
2009	ER	Dick White	Episode: "And in the End..."
2009	Melrose Place	Gary Sarling	Episode: "Pilot"
2009	The Forgotten	Coach Flynn	Episode: "Football John"
2009	CSI: NY	Dr. Harvey Fuller	Episode: "Hammer Down"
2009	NCIS: Los Angeles	Malcolm Tallridge	Episode: "Ambush"
2010	Private Practice	Simon McConnell	3 episodes
2010	Undercovers	Brian Murphy	Episode: "Jailbreak"
2010	Criminal Minds	Agent Grady Beeks	Episode: "Safe Haven"
2011	Memphis Beat	Miles Ahomana / Miles Hart	Episode: "Inside Man"
2011	Drop Dead Diva	Steve Vaught	Episode: "Mother's Day"
2011	Prime Suspect	Doug Roenick	2 episodes
2011	Rizzoli & Isles	Chief Joe Kobolsnik	Episode: "Burning Down the House"
2012	The Mentalist	Andrew Kellogg	Episode: "My Bloody Valentine"
2012	Hawaii Five-0	Andrei Shepkin	Episode: "I Helu Pu (The Reckoning)"
2012	Breakout Kings	Ken	Episode: "Self Help"
2012	The Vampire Diaries	Pastor Young	2 episodes
2012–2013	Vegas	D.A. Jerry Reynolds	9 episodes
2012, 2015	Revenge	Agent John McGowen	4 episodes
2013	Grey's Anatomy	Mr. Finch	Episode: "Hard Bargain"
2013	Burn Notice	Peter Mallard	Episode: "Nature of the Beast"
2014–2015	Satisfaction	Daniel Harper	4 episodes
2015	Backstrom	Donald Sampson	Episode: "Give 'Til It Hurts"
2015	Code Black	Frank Irving	Episode: "The Son Rises"
2015	Bones	Luke Nicholson	Episode: "The Cowboy in the Contest"
2015	Paradise Pictures	Frank Capra	TV movie
2015–2016	Shameless	Theo Wallace	6 episodes
2015, 2018	Suits	Teddy	2 episodes
2017	Training Day	Robert Burns	Episode: "Tehrangeles"
2017	NCIS: New Orleans	General John Walsh	Episode: "The Last Stand"
2017	Switched at Birth	Dr. Eric Bannon	Episode: "Long Live Love"
2017	How to Get Away with Murder	Louis Lindgren	Episode: "I Love Her"
2018	Lethal Weapon	Sean O'Brien	Episode: "Diggin' Up Dirt"
2018	Supergirl	Preston	Episode: "Not Kansas"
2019	The Passage	Danny	Episode: "That Never Should Have Happened to You"
2019	S.W.A.T.	CIA Agent Devereaux	Episode: "Immunity"
2019	You	Ray Quinn	Episode: "Have a Good Wellkend, Joe!"
2020	Council of Dads	Chris Ashford	Episode: "Fight or Flight"
2021	The Rookie	Fred Mitchell	Episode: "Poetic Justice"
2023	The Company You Keep	Claude Ellsworth	Episode: "A Sparkling Reputation"
2023	So Help Me Todd	Bowen Perrin	Episode: "Gloom and Boom"
2024	Griselda	Captain Sweetwater	3 episodes
