= Ever Carradine =

American actress (born 1974)

- Born: August 6, 1974 (age 52)
- Education: Lewis & Clark College
- Occupation: Actress
- Years active: 1996–present
- Spouse: Coby Brown (m. 2005)
- Children: 2
- Father: Robert Carradine

Ever Carradine (born August 6, 1974) is an American actress. She is known for her roles as Tiffany Porter and Kelly Ludlow on the ABC television series Once and Again and Commander in Chief, and as Naomi Putnam and Janet Stein on the Hulu original series The Handmaid's Tale and Runaways, respectively. She is the daughter of actor Robert Carradine.

== Career ==
After graduating from Lewis & Clark College in 1996, she returned to Los Angeles and appeared in several television shows including Diagnosis: Murder, Tracey Takes On..., and The Sentinel. In 1998, she received her first recurring guest role as Rosalie, a love interest on Party of Five. She appeared as Pepper, a ditzy assistant on Veronica's Closet. In 2003, she got her first regular series role on Lucky, an FX drama about a professional poker player living in Las Vegas.

She starred in the film Dead & Breakfast and has appeared in films including Bubble Boy, Jay and Silent Bob Strike Back, and Lucky 13. She appeared on the show Once and Again from 1999 to 2002, and on Commander in Chief from 2005 to 2006. She has had recurring guest roles on the shows Major Crimes (as Rusty's biological mother), Veronica's Closet, Party of Five, and Women's Murder Club. She has also appeared in television shows such as House, Law & Order: Criminal Intent, CSI, Will & Grace, Just Shoot Me!, and 24.

She had recurring roles on the TV series Eureka, and on Showtime's Shameless. Carradine also guested on an episode of Rizzoli & Isles. She appeared in the first season of the Amazon series Goliath, portrayed Linda on the television show Code Black, and since 2017 has played Naomi Putnam on the Hulu series The Handmaid's Tale, being promoted to the main cast for the last season of the series. From 2017–2019, she was a series regular on Runaways playing the role of Janet Stein.

== Personal life ==
Carradine and her husband Coby Brown have two children, a daughter and a son.

== Filmography ==
=== Film ===
Year	Title	Role
1996	Foxfire	Girl in printshop
1999	Lost and Found	Ginger
2000	Ropewalk	Melissa
2001	Jay and Silent Bob Strike Back	Jay's Mother
2001	Bubble Boy	Lisa
2002	Robbing 'Hef	Candice
2002	Life Without Dick	Tina
2003	Dead End	Cheyenne Faith
2003	My Boss's Daughter	Julie Morehouse
2004	Dead & Breakfast	Sara
2005	Lucky 13	Gretchen
2005	Constellation	Celeste Korngold
2013	Truck Stop	Lois
2013	Guns for Hire	Athena
2013	Frank vs. God	Rachel Levin
2020	All My Life	Gigi

=== Television ===
Year	Title	Role	Notes
1996	Diagnosis: Murder	Debbie	Episode: "Murder Can Be Murder"
1997	Born Into Exile	Hooker	TV film
1997	The Sentinel	Greta	Episode: "Private Eyes"
1997	Tracey Takes On...	Young Woman	Episode: "Movies"
1997	Alright Already	Salesgirl	Episode: "Again with the Black Box"
1997–1998	Veronica's Closet	Pepper	8 episodes
1998	Party of Five	Rosalie	6 episodes
1998	Conrad Bloom	Nina Bloom	Main role
1999	Chicks	Vera	TV film
1999–2002	Once and Again	Tiffany Porter	Recurring role (season 1); main role (seasons 2–3)
2000	Just Shoot Me!	Gwen	Episode: "Hot Nights in Paris"
2000	Nikki	Patti	Episode: "Fierce"
2000	Will & Grace	Pam	Episode: "Lows in the Mid-Eighties"
2001	3rd Rock from the Sun	Cheryl	Episode: "Dick's Ark"
2002	Couples	Beth	TV film
2003	Lucky	Theresa	3 episodes
2004	Line of Fire	Kelly Sorenson	Episode: "The Best-Laid Plans"
2004	House	Karen Hartig	Episode: "Maternity"
2004	CSI: Crime Scene Investigation	Faye Minden	Episode: "Eleven Angry Jurors"
2005	Grey's Anatomy	Athena	Episode: "The Self-Destruct Button"
2005–2006	Commander in Chief	Kelly Ludlow	Main role
2006	Men in Trees	Liza Frist	Episodes: "Ladies Frist", "New York Fiction: Part 1"
2007	Cleaverville	Grace	TV film
2007	Law & Order: Criminal Intent	Jolene	Episode: "Bombshell"
2007–2008	Women's Murder Club	Heather Donnelly	5 episodes
2008	The Madness of Jane	Jane	Unaired pilot
2008–2009	Eureka	Lexi Carter	8 episodes
2009	See Kate Run	Abby Sullivan	TV film
2009	24	Erika	5 episodes
2009	Supernatural	Julia Wright	Episode: "I Believe the Children Are Our Future"
2009	Private Practice	Kara	Episode: "The Hard Part"
2010	Castle	Mirielle Lefcourt	Episode: "Murder Most Fowl"
2011	The Mentalist	Cheryl Meade	Episode: "Red Gold"
2011	Rizzoli & Isles	Randi Gordon	Episode: "Living Proof"
2012	The Finder	Agent Judy Green	Episode: "The Great Escape"
2012	Breakout Kings	Claire Lyons	Episode: "I Smell Emmy"
2012	Drop Dead Diva	Ramona	Episode: "Winning Ugly"
2013	CSI: Crime Scene Investigation	Dr. Darcy Shaw	Episode: "Double Fault"
2013	Bones	Delores Martin	Episode: "The Friend in Need"
2014–2016	Major Crimes	Sharon Beck	10 episodes
2015	Backstrom	Lucy Harms	Episode: "I Like to Watch"
2015	The Devil You Know	Ann Putnam Sr.	TV pilot
2016	Shameless	Erica	4 episodes
2016	Goliath	Rachel Kennedy	5 episodes
2016	Code Black	Linda	Episodes: "What Lies Beneath", "1.0 Bodies"
2017–2025	The Handmaid's Tale	Naomi Putnam	21 episodes
2017–2019	Runaways	Janet Stein	Main role
2019	All Rise	Felice Bell	Episode: "How to Succeed in Law Without Really Re-Trying"
2020	The Good Doctor	Alice Gottfried	Episode: "Fixation"
2021	Good Girls	Denise Carpenter	Episode: "You"
2022	The Rookie	Evelyn Reed	Episode: "End Game"
2022	The Conners	Pamela Finch	Episode: "Book Bans and Guillotine Hands"
2023	Based on a True Story	Melissa Lake	Episode: "The Survivor"
2024	The Neighborhood	Ashley	Episode: "Welcome to the Other Butlers"
