= Sasha Alexander =

American actress (born 1973)

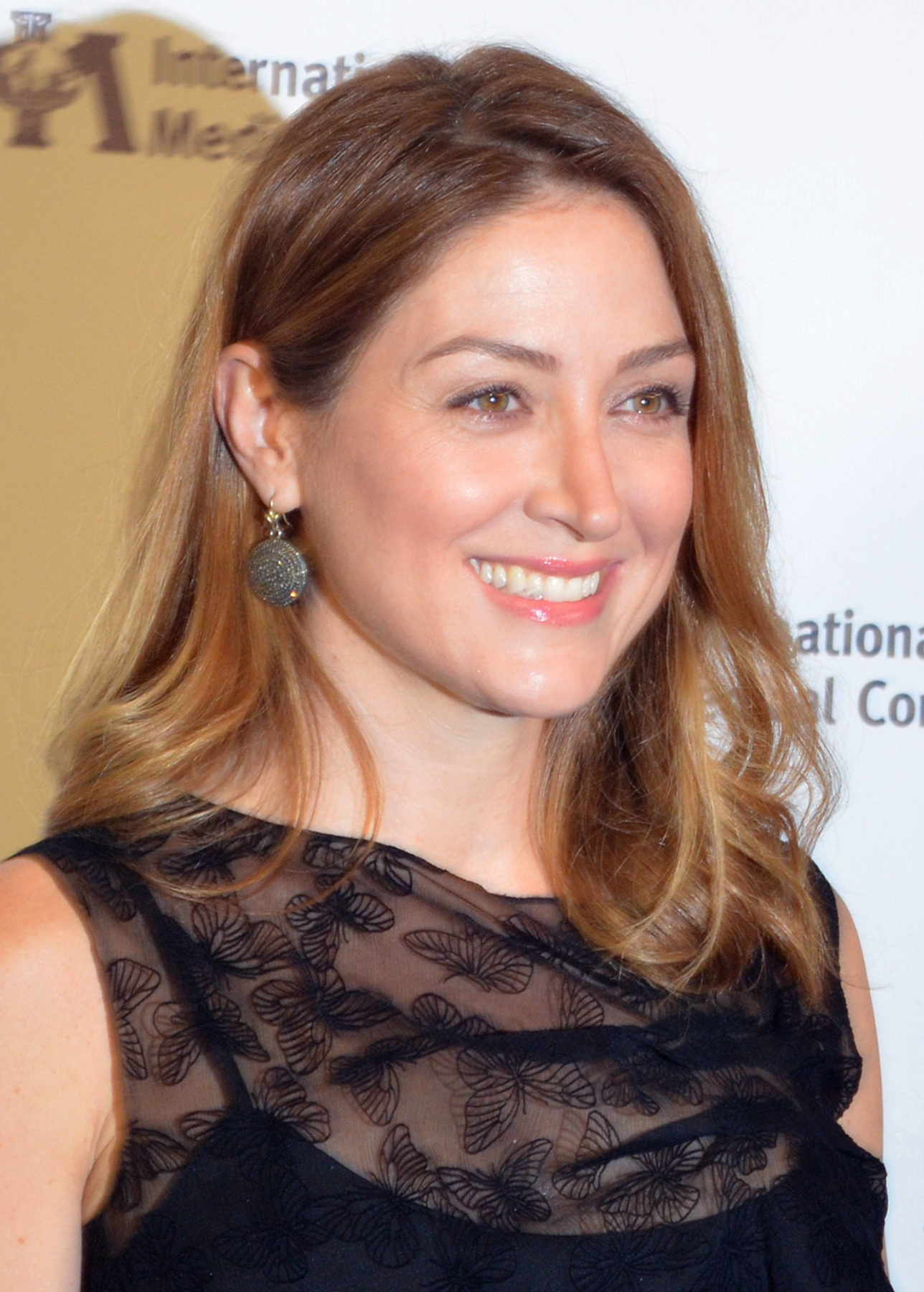
- Alexander in 2012
- Born: Suzana Drobnjakovic; May 17, 1973 (age 53); Los Angeles, California, U.S.
- Education: University of Southern California
- Occupation: Actress
- Years active: 1997–present
- Known for: Caitlin Todd in NCIS; Maura Isles in Rizzoli & Isles
- Spouses: Luka Pecel (m. 1999; ann. 2003) Edoardo Ponti (m. 2007)
- Children: 2
- Relatives: Carlo Ponti (father-in-law); Sophia Loren (mother-in-law); Carlo Ponti Jr. (brother-in-law)

Suzana Drobnjakovic (Serbian Cyrillic: Сузана Дробњаковић; born May 17, 1973), known professionally as Sasha Alexander, is an American actress. She played Gretchen Witter in Dawson's Creek (2000–2001) and appeared in such films as Yes Man (2008) and He's Just Not That Into You (2009). Alexander played Caitlin Todd for the first two seasons of NCIS (2003–2005). From July 2010 through September 2016, Alexander starred as Maura Isles in the TNT series Rizzoli & Isles, and was a regular in Season 5 and 6 of Shameless in 2015–16.

== Early life ==
Sasha Alexander, who is of Serbian descent, was born Suzana Drobnjakovic on May 17, 1973, in Los Angeles, California. She began acting in school productions in the seventh grade. She was also an ice skater, but stopped due to a knee injury. She continued acting through high school and college, then moved to New York City to act in summer stock and Shakespeare festivals. She graduated from the University of Southern California's School of Cinema-Television, where she was a member of the sorority Kappa Alpha Theta.

== Career ==
Alexander got her acting start on two short-lived series: the medical drama Presidio Med and ABC's twenty-something drama Wasteland. She achieved widespread media attention and critical praise when she appeared in the fourth season of Dawson's Creek as Gretchen Witter, the sister of Pacey Witter, and dated the title character. Alexander was also in an episode of the short-lived Fox comedy series Greg the Bunny, in which she played the role of a lesbian TV Guide reporter and shared an onscreen kiss with Sarah Silverman.

Alexander appeared in the films Lucky 13 and All Over the Guy, as well as He's Just Not That Into You (in the role of Catherine), the independent movie The Last Lullaby, and Yes Man (as Lucy) starring Jim Carrey. She appeared as District Attorney Robin Childs in the CSI episode "Alter Boys", and she appeared in an episode of Friends ("The One with Joey's Interview"), playing a Soap Opera Digest reporter who interviewed Joey.

Alexander joined NCIS as Secret Service/NCIS Special Agent Caitlin "Kate" Todd in 2003. Her character replaced Vivian Blackadder, played by Robyn Lively, who had appeared in the backdoor pilot episodes "Ice Queen" and "Meltdown" on JAG. The official pilot episode "Yankee White" aired September 23, 2003, on CBS. Alexander's two-year tenure on the show ended in May 2005 when her character, Kate, was killed by a terrorist who shoots her in the head during the last few seconds of the season-two finale, "Twilight". The official explanation for her departure was that "she asked to be let out of her contract to pursue other opportunities". In statements made by Alexander since her departure from NCIS, she has made clear that her problem with the show was that she felt the workload was too physically demanding for her. In 2023 she stated on the podcast The Double L Show, that those claims of the workload being too demanding for her are in fact not true, since she was an olympic trained ice skater and very physically capable. She also mentioned that her real reason leaving the show was that she felt she needed to remove herself from a toxic situation for the sake of her mental health, calling out her colleague Mark Harmon to be a bully.

In subsequent television series work, episode counts were considerably smaller, and her character portrayals required less physical effort than her role on NCIS. In her final appearances in the two-part episode "Kill Ari", Alexander was credited as a special guest star. Her character Caitlin Todd reappeared in a "what if" scenario with Anthony DiNozzo for the NCIS 200th episode "Life Before His Eyes" in 2012, however, Alexander did not return to film new footage for the episode; rather footage from the second season episode "SWAK" was recut to incorporate her into the new episode. She also had a small role in 2006's Mission: Impossible III. She joined the cast of The Nine in the role of Nick's ex-wife.

From 2010 to 2016, Alexander played Dr. Maura Isles for seven seasons on the TNT series Rizzoli & Isles – the Commonwealth of Massachusetts' Chief Medical Examiner, who works with the Boston Police Department. Alexander co-starred with Angie Harmon, who played Boston Homicide Detective Jane Rizzoli, Isles's best friend on the show. Whilst Dr Isles is not canonically autistic, Alexander has acknowledged the character as a "positive [re]presentation" of autism spectrum disorder (formerly known as Asperger's), stating she is "so proud" of the positive visibility her portrayal provided to audiences with autism.

In 2015, Alexander began a recurring role on Showtime's Shameless portraying Helene Runyon, one of Lip Gallagher's college professors. Her character Helene maintains an open relationship with her husband Theo (played by Michael Reilly Burke) which allows her to have sex with Lip. The relationship between Helene and Lip is both romantic and one which provides him with guidance in his college career, but the affair blew up in season six (2016).

Alexander was cast opposite Ludacris in the 2018 drama film The Ride. In 2018, Alexander guest-starred in the Law & Order: Special Victims Unit episode, "Caretaker" (season 20, episode 7), as villainess Anna Mill. Alexander played Detective Chesler in the 2020 Netflix film, Dangerous Lies.

In 2020, Alexander voiced Adeline Kane in the animated web-series Deathstroke: Knights & Dragons, based on DC Comics. In 2021, Alexander directed the 9th episode "Red Flag" of season 3 of the Netflix show You.

== Personal life ==
On September 18, 1999, Alexander married Luka Pecel, but their marriage was later annulled. She married director Edoardo Ponti (the younger son of actress Sophia Loren and film producer Carlo Ponti) in 2007. They have two children, a daughter Lucia and a son Leonardo. Jessica Capshaw is godmother to Lucia. Alexander speaks English, Serbian, Italian, and some French.

In December 2018, Alexander defended NCIS co-star Michael Weatherly after he was accused of sexual harassment by Eliza Dushku.

== Filmography ==
=== Film ===
Year	Title	Role	Notes
1997	Visceral Matter	Karen Chambers	
1997	Battle of the Sexes	Annie	Short film
1999	Twin Falls Idaho	Miss America	
2001	All Over the Guy	Jackie Samantha Gold	
2005	Lucky 13	Susie	
2006	Mission: Impossible III	Melissa Meade	
2007	NCIS: Ducky's World	Special Agent Caitlin Todd	Video short
2008	The Last Lullaby	Sarah	
2008	Yes Man	Lucy Burns	
2008	Tenure	Margaret	
2009	He's Just Not That Into You	Catherine	
2009	Love Happens	Jessica (photographer)	
2009	Play Dead	Carolanne	Video
2011	Coming & Going	Alex Michaels	
2013	The Girl from Nagasaki	Adelaide	
2017	Bernard and Huey	Roz	
2018	Amanda McKay	Marianne	
2018	The Ride	Marianna Buultjens	
2020	Dangerous Lies	Detective Chesler	

== Television ==
=== As actress ===
Year	Title	Role	Notes
1999	Wasteland	Jesse Presser	Main role (season 1)
2000–2001	Dawson's Creek	Gretchen Witter	Recurring role (season 4)
2001	CSI: Crime Scene Investigation	District Attorney Robin Childs	Episode: "Alter Boys"
2001	Ball & Chain	Chloe Jones	TV movie
2002	Friends	Shelley	Episode: "The One with Joey's Interview"
2002	Greg the Bunny	Laura Carlson	Episode: "Surprise!"
2002	Presidio Med	Dr. Jackie Collette	Main role (season 1)
2003	Expert Witness		TV movie
2003–2005; 2012; 2015	NCIS	Special Agent Caitlin Todd	Main role (Seasons 1–2); Guest role (Seasons 3, 9 & 12); Voice (season 8)
2006	E-Ring	Allyson Merrill	Episode: "War Crimes"
2006	The Nine	Juliana	Episode: "Outsiders"
2009	Dark Blue	DEA Agent Julia Harris	Episode: "A Shot in the Dark"
2009	The Karenskys	Emily Atwood	TV movie
2010	House	Nora	Episode: "The Down Low"
2010–2016	Rizzoli & Isles	Dr. Maura Isles	Main role (Seasons 1–7)
2015–2016	Shameless	Helene Runyon	Recurring role (Seasons 5–7)
2016	Dinner at Tiffani's	Herself	Episode: "Ladies Who Lunch"
2016	Celebrity Name Game	Herself	Episode 121
2018	Law & Order: Special Victims Unit	Anna Mill	Episode: "Caretaker"
2019	FBI	Valerie Caldwell	Episode: "American Idol"
2020	Curb Your Enthusiasm	Michelle	Episode: "Elizabeth, Margaret and Larry"
2020	Deathstroke: Knights & Dragons	Adeline "Addie" Kane (voice)	Main role
2020	Amazing Stories	Paula Porter	Episode: "The Cellar"
2023	Law & Order	Congresswoman Kristin Bartell	Episode: "Private Lives"
2023	The Morning Show	Salma	Episode: "Love Island"
2026	The Lincoln Lawyer	FBI Agent Dawn Ruth	Season 4

=== As director ===
Year	Title	Notes
2016	Rizzoli & Isles	Episode: "For Richer or Poorer"
2021	You	Episode: "Red Flag"
2022	Bull	Episode: "Opening Up"

=== As producer ===
Year	Title	Notes
2005	Lucky 13	Co-producer

== Accolades ==
Year	Association	Category	Work	Result	Ref.
2016	People's Choice Awards	Favorite Cable TV Actress	Rizzoli & Isles	Won	
