= Rebecca Metz =

American actress

- Born: Freehold Township, New Jersey, U.S.
- Education: Carnegie Mellon University (BFA)
- Occupation: Actress
- Years active: 1998–present
- Known for: Tressa in Better Things; Melinda in Shameless; Jenna Wrather in Coop & Cami Ask the World
- Spouse: Andy Hermann

Rebecca Metz is an American actress. She is best known for her roles as Tressa on the FX television comedy-drama series Better Things, Melinda on the Showtime television comedy-drama series Shameless and Jenna Wrather on the Disney Channel comedy series Coop & Cami Ask the World.

== Life and career ==
Metz was born and raised in Freehold Township, New Jersey and graduated from Carnegie Mellon University. In 1998, she had her first television appearance on the ABC series Politically Incorrect. Later, Metz won other roles on a variety of TV shows like Nip/Tuck, Boston Legal, The Mentalist, Californication, The Mindy Project, Shameless and more.

In 2010, she was the player support manager for Disney's Toontown Online. Later that year, she became the community manager for the game, until May 2011, when Disney laid off a majority of Toontown Online staff.

In 2016, she was cast in a recurring role as Tressa in the FX television comedy series Better Things. She is also a voice-over and stage actor whose theater credits include Sheila Callaghan's Kate Crackernuts and Burglars of Hamm's, The Behavior of Broadus.

In 2018, she was cast as Jenna Wrather on Disney Channel's live-action comedy Coop & Cami Ask the World which premiered on October 12, 2018.

== Filmography ==
=== Television ===
| Year | Title | Role | Note |
|---|---|---|---|
| 1998 | Politically Incorrect | High School Linda Tripp | |
| 2000 | Strong Medicine | Mary in Chat Room | |
| 2000 | That's Life | Bride | |
| 2002 | The King of Queens | Lee-Anne | |
| 2002 | ER | Waitress | |
| 2002–2004 | Gilmore Girls | Ann / Woman Two | |
| 2004 | Angel | Young Nurse | |
| 2005 | Medium | Diane | |
| 2005 | Committed | Deli Server | |
| 2005 | Malcolm in the Middle | Mother | |
| 2006 | Scrubs | Volunteer Woman | |
| 2006 | Eve | Phyllis | |
| 2006 | Without a Trace | Jenny Payne | |
| 2005–2006 | Nip/Tuck | Abby Mays | |
| 2007 | Boston Legal | Lynnie Cox | |
| 2008 | Unhitched | Mother | |
| 2008 | Prison Break | Claudia | |
| 2009 | The Mentalist | Carol Gentry | |
| 2011 | Justified | Emily | |
| 2012 | Southland | Shannon Walsh | |
| 2012 | Weeds | Gina | |
| 2012 | Person of Interest | Barbara Russell (1991) | |
| 2012 | American Horror Story | Lorene | |
| 2013 | Parenthood | Alexis | |
| 2013 | The Middle | Saleslady | |
| 2014 | Californication | Casting Director | |
| 2015 | NCIS: Los Angeles | Lady | |
| 2015 | Cam Girls | Ruth | |
| 2015 | The Thundermans | Mrs. Austin | |
| 2015 | The Mindy Project | Diana | |
| 2016 | Recovery Road | Donna Marie / Donna | |
| 2016 | Criminal Minds | Dr. Sandra Lee | |
| 2016 | Maron | Tina | |
| 2016 | Major Crimes | Jan Adamms | |
| 2015–2016 | Shameless | Melinda | |
| 2016 | Grey's Anatomy | Brenda Lawson | |
| 2017 | Bones | Lady | |
| 2017 | Lopez | Camilla | |
| 2017 | This Is Us | Martina | |
| 2016–2022 | Better Things | Tressa | |
| 2017 | Conversations in L.A. | Dr. Nowak | |
| 2018 | For the People | Sharon Dodds | |
| 2018–2020 | Coop & Cami Ask the World | Jenna Wrather | |
| 2020 | AJ and the Queen | Yolanda | |
| 2021 | CSI: Vegas | State Trooper Stubb | Episode: "Funhouse" |
| 2022 | Life By Ella | Nurse Pam | |
| 2023 | The Rookie | Medical Examiner | |
| 2024 | Young Sheldon | Officer Lisa Gilroy | 2 episodes |
| 2024–present | Georgie & Mandy's First Marriage | Officer Lisa Gilroy | 2 episodes |

=== Film ===
| Year | Title | Role | Notes |
|---|---|---|---|
| 2006 | K-7 | Receptionist | Short Film |
| 2006 | The Shabbos Bigfoot | Hannah | |
| 2014 | Asthma | Pawn Shop Clerk | |
| 2014 | You & I, My Dear | Mary | Short film |
| 2020 | Magic Camp | Mrs. Jenkins | |
