= Wrestling Isn't Wrestling =

2015 film by Max Landis

- Promotional poster parodying The Social Network
- Directed by: Max Landis
- Written by: Max Landis
- Produced by: Shyam Sengupta; Dave Holton; Matt Cohen
- Starring: Max Landis; Chloe Dykstra; Ana Walczak; Lola Blanc; Andi Layne
- Cinematography: Stephen Sorace
- Edited by: Andy Holton
- Music by: Evan Goldman
- Production company: Adjacent LA
- Release date: March 16, 2015
- Running time: 24 minutes
- Country: United States
- Language: English

Wrestling Isn't Wrestling is a 2015 short film written and directed by Max Landis. Released for free on YouTube, the film retells the story of WWE professional wrestler Triple H. Like Landis's 2012 short The Death and Return of Superman, it consists of a monologue by Landis on the subject matter, accompanied by sequences with actors performing the parts in the story.

== Plot ==
In response to the common criticism that professional wrestling is "fake," Max Landis attempts to defend the sport as a legitimately compelling form of fiction. To make this point, he points out that modern professional wrestling contains multiple overtly unrealistic elements that hinge on willing suspension of disbelief, and notes that the scripted nature of wrestling matches doesn't make their stunt-work and choreography any less spectacular.

In an effort to prove that wrestling can be as entertaining as any other form of fiction, Landis recounts the story of his favorite wrestler Paul Levesque, better known by his ring name "Triple H". His retelling of Triple H's wrestling career starts with his early days as the wealthy and snobbish "Hunter Hearst Helmsley," continues with his friendship with Shawn Michaels and his co-founding of the rebellious and rambunctious "D-Generation X," and ultimately recounts his reign as World Heavyweight Champion, his time as the brutal and paranoid leader of "Evolution," and his reinvention as a powerful corporate strongman.

In recounting the evolution of Triple H's in-ring persona, Landis presents the interpretation that all of the wrestler's various gimmicks are different facets of the same character: an arrogant but deeply insecure man with an inferiority complex, who never got over the pain of being overshadowed by better wrestlers. The retelling ends with Triple H's ascension to COO of the WWE following his marriage to Stephanie McMahon; Landis suggests that Triple H sought power behind the scenes of the company because he could never achieve the glory that he truly desired in the ring.

== Cast ==
=== Main ===
- Max Landis as Himself
- Chloe Dykstra as Triple H
- Ana Walczak as Shawn Michaels
- Lola Blanc as The Undertaker
- Andi Layne as John Cena
- Lissy Smith, Clare Kramer, and Chloe West as DX Army
- Kandiss Lewis as Stephanie McMahon
- Nicole Stark as Randy Orton
- Anna Akana as Batista
- Sideara St. Claire as Ric Flair
- Anna Lore as Daniel Bryan

=== Cameos ===
- Adam Savage and Jamie Hyneman as Themselves
- Christina Scherer as Chris Benoit
- Cat Alter as Chris Jericho
- Chris Bauer as Referee
- Jenny Becerra as Mankind
- Matt Bennett as a John Cena Fan
- David Arquette as Himself
- Graham Denman as Paul Bearer
- Rose Chirillo as Road Warrior Hawk
- Charley Feldman as Road Warrior Animal
- Brittany Furlan as Goldberg
- Bill Goldberg as Himself
- Morgan Krantz as Superman
- Hannah Landberg as Stone Cold Steve Austin
- Clare Lourdes as X-Pac
- Lissy Smith as Road Dogg
- Alita LaShae as The Rock
- Melodie Gore as CM Punk
- Shelby Steel as Sheamus
- Dani "Haystack" Manning as Kane
- Milana Vayntrub as The Ultimate Warrior
- Brad Gage and Matt Cohen as Strip Club Crowd
- Chloe West as Billy Gunn
- Sam Witwer as Chyna
- Seth Green and Macaulay Culkin as DX Fans
- Justin Roberts, Kat Leigh, Becky Bayless, DC Pierson, Matt Henderson, Adam Rifkin, Cambria Edwards, Josh Peck, Frankie Kazarian, Christopher Daniels, Ricardo Orta, David Blue, Christopher Wayne Thompson, Hannah Marks, Nicholas Braun, Haley Joel Osment, Shad Gaspard, Zack Pearlman, Stephen Lunsford, Colt Cabana, Olga Kay, Darren Criss, Ryan Nemeth, Chris Hero, Alicia Way, Marty DeRosa, Jordan Dobbs Rosa, Coy Jandeau, Brett Delby, Stephen Sorace, Rebecca Rowley, Jason Weiss, and JTG as Theater Audience Members
- Matthew Mercer, Yuri Lowenthal, Lydia Bottom, Mennell Tatiana, Jacqueline Besson, and Taliesin Jaffe as Fancy People
- John Landis as Therapist
- Jon Schnepp as a Rabbi
- Mars Argo as Ghostly Girl
- Vincent Spano as Creepy Old Man
- Joey Ryan as An '80s American Wrestler
- John Hennigan as An '80s Russian Wrestler
- Rosa Salazar, Moses Storm, and Shaun Brown as People Watching Game of Thrones
- Dustin Milligan as The Bartender 1
- Mike Diva as The Bartender 2

== Production ==
Funded entirely by Landis, the film was shot at thirty locations throughout Los Angeles over the course of three weeks. It features a cast of close to a hundred extras, with most people involved working for free. Ron Howard was intended to make a cameo appearance, as he did in The Death and Return of Superman, but was unavailable for filming. In a Reddit "Ask Me Anything" Landis mentioned that his father John Landis was initially hesitant to appear in the short due to an aversion to being involved in his son's work, but ultimately agreed once he saw the finished product.

== Reception ==
Writing for the Wall Street Journal, Michael Calia said that Landis's characterization of wrestling as "packed with the stuff of fiction, both good and terrible" was "not exactly a new insight", but said that Landis "defends wrestling in a fun, inventive way". Writing for Progressive Boink, Bill Hanstock praised the short for not only serving as a comprehensive history of the Triple H character, but for delving into the "subtext, motive and narrative arc for a character that didn't really occur to me in precisely this way before." Users on Letterboxd currently rate the film 3.6 out of 5.

Initially, it was reported by Bryan Alvarez that employees of the WWE were told not to publicly comment on the video. Max Landis himself, however, responded to this on Twitter and clarified that this was simply due to the videos non family friendly content. The video was eventually praised by Triple H and Stephanie McMahon, both of whom it depicts as characters. The short earned Landis a position as a creative consultant on WWE Raw.
