= Matt Bennett =

American actor and DJ (born 1991)

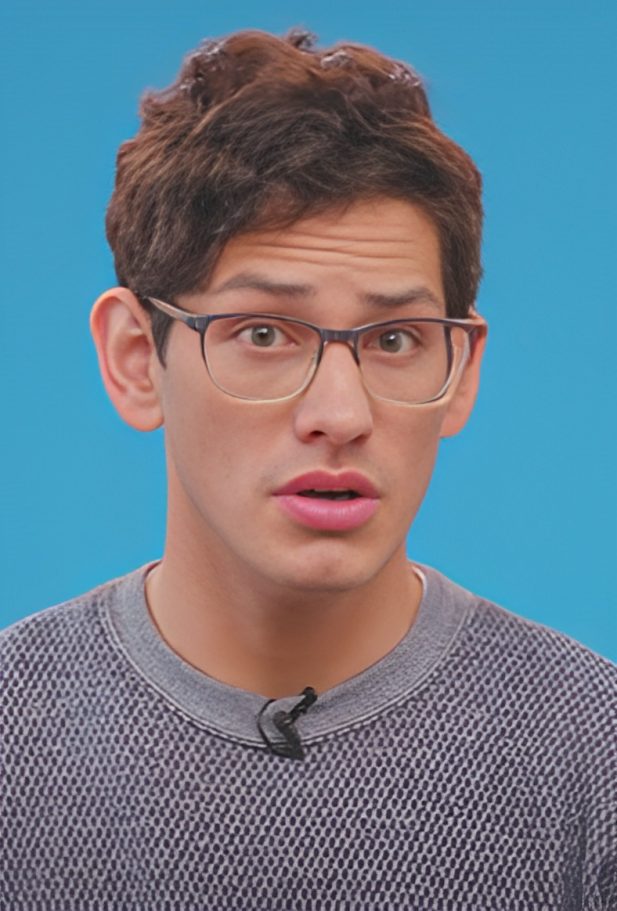
- Bennett in 2020
- Born: November 13, 1991 (age 35); Massapequa Park, New York, U.S.
- Occupations: Actor; DJ
- Years active: 2009–present

Matthew H. Bennett (born November 13, 1991) is an American actor and DJ. He is known for playing Robbie Shapiro in the Nickelodeon sitcom Victorious. His film roles include The Virginity Hit, Bridesmaids, Me and Earl and the Dying Girl, The Stanford Prison Experiment and Manson Family Vacation. He has guest-starred on shows such as The Big Bang Theory, American Vandal and Dynasty. Since 2022, he has primarily worked as a DJ, performing Disney and Nickelodeon songs at several venues.

== Life and career ==
Bennett was born and raised in Massapequa Park, New York. After appearing in numerous commercials, Bennett began his acting career at the age of 18 as Jamie, in the 2009 TV movie Totally for Teens. He also appeared as Greg the Intern in the pilot episode of the Comedy Central sketch comedy series Michael & Michael Have Issues.

Bennett had his first starring film role in The Virginity Hit, which was produced by Funny or Die founders Will Ferrell and Adam McKay and released in October 2010. Described as a "documentary style comedy," Bennett stated that the film's "directors gave us cameras in our spare time, and he said do pranks, talk amongst yourselves, do things and film that. So we did, and most of the movie is what we filmed. So I feel like 20% is scripted but the rest is all real." He said in another interview with MTV News that the film is "not just another teen sex romp. It's a film with heart and a bit of a soul and deep-down it’s a cool love story."

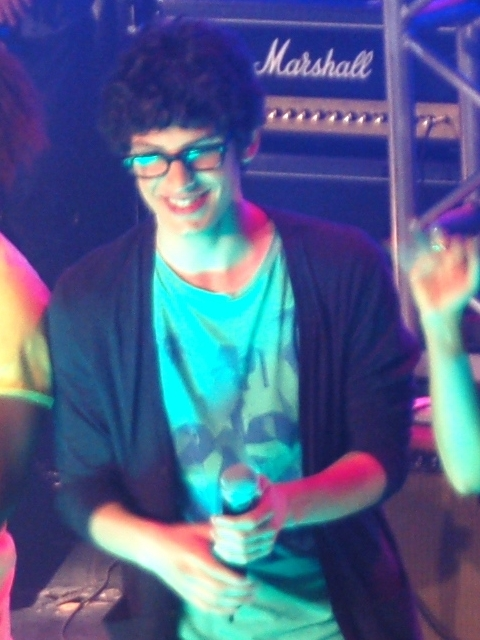
Bennett performing with the cast of Victorious

Bennett co-starred as Robbie Shapiro in the Nickelodeon sitcom Victorious from 2010 to 2013. He was nominated for a 2011 Nickelodeon Kids' Choice Award (UK) in the category of "Nick UK's Funniest Person".

In March 2013, it was announced that Bennett would host a web series for the YouTube channel Nerdist. On the series, entitled "Nerdy Jobs", Bennett will go behind the scenes of many "Nerdy" jobs to show how interesting they are.

Bennett has appeared in two of his Victorious co-star Ariana Grande's music videos: "One Last Time" in 2015, and "Thank U, Next" in 2018, the latter of which also features several Victorious cast members. Also in 2015, he starred in the music video for Poppy's 2015 "Lowlife" and guest-starred as Josh Wolowitz in The Big Bang Theory episode "The Fortification Implementation". He had roles in the films Me and Earl and the Dying Girl, The Stanford Prison Experiment and Manson Family Vacation, all of which were released in 2015.

In 2016, Bennett had a role on the show Fresh Off the Boat. On February 2, 2016, he announced his debut studio album Terminal Cases, which he described as "a concept album about my parents' divorce where every song is inspired by different Robin Williams movies." It was released independently on June 10, 2016.

In 2019, Bennett, alongside Elizabeth Gillies, made a surprise appearance during the November 19 show of Ariana Grande's Sweetener World Tour in Atlanta, in which Grande and Bennett performed "I Think You're Swell" and Grande and Gillies performed "Give It Up" from Victorious.

In 2022, Bennett guest-starred on an episode of the soap opera Dynasty, a reboot of the 1981 series of the same name, reuniting with Elizabeth Gillies who leads the show.

Beginning in 2022, Bennett has toured as a DJ, playing songs from Disney and Nickelodeon series at several venues, including House of Blues chains. The shows are billed as "iParty with DJ Matt Bennett," and since 2023, "Party101 with Matt Bennett." As of 2025, these tours have gone international, reaching locations such as the UK and Australia.

== Filmography ==
=== Film ===
Year	Title	Role	Notes
2009	Text Me	Noah	Short film
2010	The Virginity Hit	Matt	
2011	Bridesmaids	Helen's stepson	Cameo
2011	The Death and Return of Superman	Superboy	Short film (credited as Matthew Bennett)
2015	Me and Earl and the Dying Girl	Scott Mayhew	
2015	The Stanford Prison Experiment	Kyle Parker	
2015	Manson Family Vacation	Buddy Holly	
2015	Me Him Her	Bones	Uncredited role
2018	Don't Worry, He Won't Get Far on Foot	Editor #2	

=== Television ===
Year	Title	Role	Notes
2009	Totally for Teens	Jamie	Episode: "Pilot"
2009	Michael & Michael Have Issues	Greg the Intern	Episode: "Greg the Intern"
2010–2013	Victorious	Robbie Shapiro	Main role
2010	BrainSurge	Contestant	Episode: "Stars of Nickelodeon 2 of 5"
2012–2013	Figure It Out	Panelist	Game show; 18 episodes
2011–2012	iCarly	Gibby (alternate universe) / Robbie Shapiro	Episodes: "iApril Fools", "iParty with Victorious"
2014	Sam & Cat	Robbie Shapiro	Episode: "#TheKillerTunaJump"
2015	The Big Bang Theory	Josh Wolowitz	Episode: "The Fortification Implementation"
2015	Shameless	Wiley	Episode: "Carl's First Sentencing"
2015	Game Shakers	Himself	Episode: "Tiny Pickles"
2015	Everybody Wants to Be Poppy	Pho	Main voice role; web series
2015	Wrestling Isn't Wrestling	John Cena Fan	Web series
2016	Fresh Off the Boat	Corey	Episode: "Gotta Be Me"
2018	Grey's Anatomy	Steve	Episode: "Old Scars, Future Hearts"
2018	American Vandal	Gavin Landers	Recurring role; 4 episodes
2022	Dynasty	Cole	Episode: "But a Drug Scandal?"
2026	Hollywood Arts	Robbie Shapiro	2 episodes

=== Music videos ===
Year	Title	Artist	Ref.
2015	"One Last Time"	Ariana Grande	
2015	"Lowlife"	Poppy	
2018	"Thank U, Next"	Ariana Grande	

== Discography ==
- Terminal Cases (2016)

== Awards and nominations ==
Year	Award	Category	Work	Result	Ref
2011	Nickelodeon UK Kids' Choice Awards	Nick UK's Funniest Person	Victorious	Nominated	
