= List of 2011 box office number-one films in Ecuador =

This is a list of films which have placed number one at the weekend box office in Ecuador during 2011.

== Number-one films ==
†	This implies the highest-grossing movie of the year.

#	Date	Film	Gross
1	January 9, 2011	Tron: Legacy	$543,280
2	January 16, 2011	Tangled	$740,837
3	January 23, 2011	Tangled	N/A
4	January 30, 2011	Gulliver's Travels	$588,421
5	February 6, 2011	Gulliver's Travels	$588,421
6	February 13, 2011	The Green Hornet	$461,384
7	February 20, 2011	Saw 3D	$522,836
8	February 27, 2011	Yogi Bear	$631,010
9	March 6, 2011	Yogi Bear	$571,041
10	March 13, 2011	Rango	$232,528
11	March 20, 2011	Mars Needs Moms	$539,038
12	March 27, 2011	Mars Needs Moms	N/A
13	April 3, 2011	Mars Needs Moms	$459,872
14	April 10, 2011	Rio †	$642,773
15	April 17, 2011	Rio †	N/A
16	April 24, 2011	Rio †	$803,323
17	May 1, 2011	Thor	$759,343
18	May 8, 2011	Thor	$675,018
19	May 15, 2011	Fast Five	$738,745
20	May 22, 2011	Pirates of the Caribbean: On Stranger Tides	$1,144,768
21	May 29, 2011	Pirates of the Caribbean: On Stranger Tides	$965,399
22	June 5, 2011	Pirates of the Caribbean: On Stranger Tides	$728,117
23	June 12, 2011	Kung Fu Panda 2	$951,368
24	June 19, 2011	Kung Fu Panda 2	$702,818
25	June 26, 2011	Cars 2	$915,984
26	July 3, 2011	Transformers: Dark of the Moon	$1,008,111
27	July 10, 2011	Transformers: Dark of the Moon	$765,244
28	July 17, 2011	Harry Potter and the Deathly Hallows – Part 2	$1,231,477
29	July 24, 2011	Harry Potter and the Deathly Hallows – Part 2	$809,517
30	July 31, 2011	Captain America: The First Avenger	$902,216
31	August 7, 2011	The Smurfs	$1,079,088
32	August 14, 2011	The Smurfs	$1,085,129
33	August 21, 2011	Green Lantern	$823,324
34	August 28, 2011	Green Lantern	$557,445
35	September 4, 2011	Fright Night	$631,984
36	September 11, 2011	Rise of the Planet of the Apes	$438,448
37	September 18, 2011	The Lion King 3D	$664,575
38	September 25, 2011	The Lion King 3D	$680,838
39	October 2, 2011	The Lion King 3D	N/A
40	October 9, 2011	Real Steel	$619,967
41	October 16, 2011	Real Steel	$467,180
42	October 23, 2011	Dolphin Tale	$534,436
43	October 30, 2011	Paranormal Activity 3	$433,395
44	November 6, 2011	Shark Night 3D	$542,466
45	November 13, 2011	Shark Night 3D	$321,563
46	November 20, 2011	The Twilight Saga: Breaking Dawn - Part 1	$754,061
47	November 27, 2011	Happy Feet Two	$388,403
48	December 11, 2011	Puss in Boots	$707,562
49	December 18, 2011	Puss in Boots	$565,350
50	December 25, 2011	Mission: Impossible – Ghost Protocol	$404,657
51	January 1, 2012	Puss in Boots	$528,991
