= Carl's First Sentencing =

- Shameless episode
- Episode no.: Season 5 Episode 9
- Directed by: Christopher Chulack
- Written by: Etan Frankel
- Cinematography by: Kevin McKnight
- Editing by: Kevin D. Ross
- Original release date: March 15, 2015
- Running time: 58 minutes

Guest appearances
- Dermot Mulroney as Sean Pierce; Sasha Alexander as Helene Runyon Robinson; Michael Reilly Burke as Theo Wallace Robinson; José Julián as Joaquin; Bojana Novakovic as Bianca Samson; Michael B. Silver as Lorenzo; Shani Atias as Stacey; Tessa Auberjonois as Kendra; Matt Bennett as Wiley; Roxana Brusso as Rita Gaither; Lawrence A. Mandley as Sam Rayburn; Rebecca Metz as Melinda; Rena Strober as Emily Knowland

Episode chronology
← Previous "Uncle Carl"	Next → "South Side Rules"
- Shameless season 5

"Carl's First Sentencing" is the ninth episode of the fifth season of the American television comedy drama Shameless, an adaptation of the British series of the same name. It is the 57th overall episode of the series and was written by co-executive producer Etan Frankel and directed by executive producer Christopher Chulack. It originally aired on Showtime on March 15, 2015.

The series is set on the South Side of Chicago, Illinois, and depicts the poor, dysfunctional family of Frank Gallagher, a neglectful single father of six: Fiona, Phillip, Ian, Debbie, Carl, and Liam. He spends his days drunk, high, or in search of money, while his children need to learn to take care of themselves. In the episode, Carl faces possible prison time, while Frank helps his doctor in achieving some of her goals.

According to Nielsen Media Research, the episode was seen by an estimated 1.62 million household viewers and gained a 0.8 ratings share among adults aged 18–49. The episode received positive reviews from critics, many of whom praised the dramatic elements of Frank's storyline.

== Plot ==
Fiona (Emmy Rossum) has moved back into the Gallagher household to help Carl (Ethan Cutkosky) with his sentencing. She meets with him and a lawyer, who declares that Carl could face one year in prison given his reckless behavior. Carl is not worried about the sentence, but changes his mind when Fiona reminds him his boss could pay to have him killed in prison.

Sammi (Emily Bergl) also meets with her lawyer and Chuckie (Kellen Michael), but she receives bad news; even though Chuckie has an intellectual disability, the evidence against him is so severe that a prison sentence is imminent. Frank (William H. Macy) visits the hospital to check his gunshot wound, but his doctor, Bianca (Bojana Novakovic), is unable to properly work and leaves. When Frank questions her, she reveals she was diagnosed with stage 3 pancreatic cancer. Frank takes her to the Alibi Room to console her; Bianca expresses that she wasted her life in just education and never having fun, and wants to try new things before dying. Frank gets her to try marijuana for the first time, run naked and punch one of her school's rivals. When she falls asleep, Frank takes her back to her house.

Lip (Jeremy Allen White) attends a new critical theory class, where he gets into a conflict with his new professor, Helene (Sasha Alexander). While she allows him to stay for the class, she makes it clear at her office that he will not be allowed back as she found out about his tuition debt. They then seize the opportunity so Lip can perform oral sex on her. Later, Lip talks with a delinquent student who has been stealing stuff from other students, but discovers that he could help hacking into the financial aid system. However, Lip is contacted by a school official, who reveals that an old friend will cover Lip's tuition until he can pay it himself, allowing him to continue in college. During this, Kevin (Steve Howey) gets the "Rape Walker" nickname after he helps female students in reaching their dorm rooms safely, and he seizes the opportunity to have sex with the sober women who seduce him.

Mickey (Noel Fisher) convinces Ian (Cameron Monaghan) in using his meds again, and Fiona helps Ian in getting a job as a dishwasher at Patsy's. At a hearing, Chuckie is sentenced to 120 days at a juvenile detention center. Afterwards, Carl is brought in, with his lawyer telling him to express remorse to avoid prison. However, Carl deviates and makes it clear he does not regret it, and is sentenced to one year in juvie. When Sean (Dermot Mulroney) does not return to work, Fiona visits him at his apartment. Sean reveals that his ex-wife is moving out of town with his son, Will. Due to his probation, Sean is unable to move with Will. Lip visits Helene to reveal he is staying at class, but they still have sex. Lip is shocked when her husband arrives, but is surprised when he finds that they are in an open relationship. To ensure that Chuckie will be protected in prison, Sammi imprints a swastika on Chuckie's forehead. When Carl and Chuckie are later taken to the prison bus, Chuckie is quickly taken in by a neo-Nazi gang, while Carl is told that G-Dog will protect him as he did not snitch.

== Production ==
The episode was written by co-executive producer Etan Frankel and directed by executive producer Christopher Chulack. It was Frankel's ninth writing credit, and Chulack's third directing credit.

== Reception ==
=== Viewers ===
In its original American broadcast, "Carl's First Sentencing" was seen by an estimated 1.62 million household viewers with a 0.8 in the 18–49 demographics. This means that 0.8 percent of all households with televisions watched the episode. This was a slight increase in viewership from the previous episode, which was seen by an estimated 1.60 million household viewers with a 0.7 in the 18–49 demographics.

=== Critical reviews ===
"Carl's First Sentencing" received positive reviews from critics. Joshua Alston of The A.V. Club gave the episode a "B" grade and wrote, "It's the first episode of the season that feels like "classic Shameless," but in this case, that means many of its stories faintly echo plots the show has already burned through. Given that season five has been characterized by false starts and meandering detours, "Carl's First Sentencing" feels like a refreshing return to form in some spots, and like a retread in others. But even the too-familiar beats are comforting after a run of episodes that have felt not quite right despite some great material sprinkled throughout them." Alston spoke positively of Frank and Bianca's storyline, writing "Of all the Shameless stories in which some poor, desperate soul happens to come along just when Frank is in need of something to do, this is among the best. [...] Bojana Novakovic turns in a lovely performance [as Bianca], making this the least annoying Frank plot in ages."

Marc Snetiker of Entertainment Weekly wrote "Ian has come around to taking medication, but his heart sinks when the nurse tells him that he'll need to aggressively treat his condition for the next 30 to 40 years. He keeps the reaction quiet, but in a rare moment between brother and brother, Lip takes Ian aside after Carl's sentencing and gives him a brief pep talk. It's not much, but it's from his older brother Lip, and that's a certain kind of bond that Ian has always respected." Allyson Johnson of The Young Folks gave the episode a 7 out of 10 rating and wrote "It's odd that an episode that danced around so many narratives struck be as so grim but maybe it's simply the nature of the show and its fans at this point to expect the worst when things are seemingly going fine. The low key nature of the direction, how every setting from near the lake where Frank shouts at God, to the holding cell where Fiona talks to Carl are all bathed in gray, certainly doesn't help with the lifeless feeling of the episode."

David Crow of Den of Geek was mixed over the episode, giving it a 3.5 star rating out of 5. Crow commended Frank and Bianca's storyline, calling it "profoundly meaningful" and praising Novakovic's performance: "Bianca is played with genuine pathos and an endearing amount of awkwardness by Bojana Novakovic." However, Crow was critical of the episode's handling of Sammi's character, writing "The only reason that Sammi is still around after this episode seems to be that she is stirring the pot and creating a lot of conflict. But it reaches the point where a story crosses the line from being a dramatic one to just being melodramatic." Whitney Evans of TV Fanatic gave the episode a 4.4 star rating out of 5 and also spoke positively on the pairing of Frank and Bianca: "The best aspects of this episode involved Frank and I don't know that I've ever felt that way. [...] It was hard not to feel for this young woman whose entire world was just upended and honestly if she was hoping to experience a day of unexpected firsts, Frank Gallagher truly is the best tour guide to have."
