= The Virtual Stage =

Canadian multimedia theatre company

- Formation: 2000
- Type: Theatre group
- Purpose: multimedia theatre
- Location: Vancouver, British Columbia, Canada
- Artistic director: Andy Thompson
- Website: thevirtualstage.org

The Virtual Stage is a professional multimedia theatre company based out of Vancouver, British Columbia, Canada. Founded in 2000 by Artistic Director Andy Thompson, The Virtual Stage focuses on the investigation of emerging technologies in theatre and often utilizes cinematic techniques and elements of film in its live productions.

== History ==
Shortly after incorporating as The Virtual Stage Arts Society in 2000, the company created a short film entitled Game Over on the theme of violent children's entertainment.

The following year, the company produced its first full-length play with the acclaimed Canadian premiere of Don DeLillo’s play Valparaiso at the Presentation House Theatre in North Vancouver. This show was the first of three that the company produced as "The Virtual Stage Co-op" under the Canadian Actors' Equity Association Equity Co-op guidelines.

In 2002, the company produced the world premiere of Andy Thompson's play The Birth of Freedom, directed by Alex Lazaridis Ferguson at Performance Works on Granville Island. The Birth of Freedom went on to garner three nominations at Vancouver's Jessie Richardson Theatre Awards: Outstanding Original Play or Musical, Sydney Risk Award for Outstanding original Script by an Emerging Playwright and winning the company's first ever award with Outstanding Performance by an Actress In a Supporting Role (Colleen Wheeler).

In 2004, the company once again produced Valparaiso, directed by Craig Hall at Performance Works on Granville Island. This production was its last under the Equity Co-op framework.

After a year-long mentorship with the Vancouver Playhouse Theatre Company, The Virtual Stage produced the world premiere of Andy Thompson's science fiction comedy play SPANK! at the Roundhouse Community Centre in 2006. SPANK! went on to garner three nominations at Vancouver's Jessie Richardson Theatre Awards: Significant Artistic Achievement for Outstanding Technical Design, Outstanding Costume Design and winning for Outstanding Performance by a Supporting Actress (Sasa Brown).

In 2008, The Virtual Stage co-produced a "live-cinematic interpretation" of Jean-Paul Sartre’s No Exit with Electric Company Theatre at the Centre for Digital Media, directed by Kim Collier. The production was highly acclaimed, leading the Jessie Richardson Theatre Awards small theatre category with eight nominations, winning for Outstanding Production and Critics’ Choice Innovation Award. The success spawned a Canadian tour of No Exit in the 2009-2010 theatre season, with productions in Kamloops (produced at the Sagebrush Theatre by Western Canadian Theatre), Toronto (presented by Nightwood Theatre at the Buddies in Bad Times theatre) and Calgary at The High Performance Rodeo (presented by One Yellow Rabbit and Theatre Calgary).

The Virtual Stage made its US and international touring debut with No Exit at American Conservatory Theater in San Francisco in 2011. Also in 2011, The Virtual Stage produced the world premiere of Andy Thompson's multi-media stage adaptation of George Orwell’s novel Nineteen Eighty-Four, co-produced by Langara College's Studio 58 and directed by Ron Jenkins at the Vancouver East Cultural Centre. Later that year, The Virtual Stage entered the Film Racing Grand Prix, an international 100-hour filmmaking competition. Its entry in the race, a superhero spoof directed by Andy Thompson entitled Repair Man, was the top-ranking Canadian film of the competition, finishing third overall.

In 2012, the company produced Andy Thompson's site-specific theatrical scavenger hunt The Zombie Syndrome in which audience members with smartphones used GPS to navigate from scene to scene on the streets of Vancouver. The Vancouver Police Department was involved in the process to ensure no violent scenes with zombies appeared in public. The interactive show was acclaimed for its originality and compared to the Choose Your Own Adventure gamebooks of the 1980s and 1990s.

== See also ==
- Theatre of Canada
- List of Canadian plays
- Vancouver's Arts and Culture
- Avante Garde
