= South Side Rules =

- Shameless episode
- Episode no.: Season 5 Episode 10
- Directed by: Michael Uppendahl
- Written by: Sheila Callaghan
- Cinematography by: Kevin McKnight
- Editing by: Gregg Featherman
- Original release date: March 22, 2015
- Running time: 53 minutes

Guest appearances
- Dermot Mulroney as Sean Pierce; Steve Kazee as Gus Pfender; Sasha Alexander as Helene Runyon Robinson; Nichole Sakura as Amanda; Michael Reilly Burke as Theo Wallace Robinson; José Julián as Joaquin; Bojana Novakovic as Bianca Samson; Luca Oriel as Derek Delgado; Jim Hoffmaster as Kermit; Annie Little as Elizabeth; Gabrielle Walsh as Tanya Delgado

Episode chronology
← Previous "Carl's First Sentencing"	Next → "Drugs Actually"
- Shameless season 5

"South Side Rules" is the tenth episode of the fifth season of the American television comedy drama Shameless, an adaptation of the British series of the same name. It is the 58th overall episode of the series and was written by supervising producer Sheila Callaghan and directed by Michael Uppendahl. It originally aired on Showtime on March 22, 2015.

The series is set on the South Side of Chicago, Illinois, and depicts the poor, dysfunctional family of Frank Gallagher, a neglectful single father of six: Fiona, Phillip, Ian, Debbie, Carl, and Liam. He spends his days drunk, high, or in search of money, while his children need to learn to take care of themselves. In the episode, Frank tries to be part of Bianca's life, while Fiona hangs out with Sean after Gus does not show up for a date.

According to Nielsen Media Research, the episode was seen by an estimated 1.67 million household viewers and gained a 0.7 ratings share among adults aged 18–49. The episode received critical acclaim, with praise towards the emotional tone and ending, although some critics commented negatively of Sammi's character development.

== Plot ==
Frank (William H. Macy) tries to help Bianca (Bojana Novakovic) with her life, but she instead asks him to leave her house. While watering the plants at his apartment, Fiona (Emmy Rossum) calls Gus (Steve Kazee) during his tour, and they arrange to have cybersex. However, Fiona is disappointed when Gus does not arrive.

Debbie (Emma Kenney) and Derek (Luca Oriel) continue their relationship, and they decide it is time to consummate their relationship that night. With Fiona's help, Debbie goes to a Planned Parenthood meeting to get birth control pills. However, Debbie is informed that the pills will not work for two days, so Derek must use a condom. Amanda (Nichole Sakura) returns, and Lip (Jeremy Allen White) reveals he had sex with Helene (Sasha Alexander), straining their relationship. Kevin (Steve Howey) has brought in his children to college, and their constant cries annoy the students. Kevin unwittingly sells synthetic marijuana to a handful of college students, which leads to one student, Joaquin (José Julián), jumping out a second story window.

At Patsy's, Ian (Cameron Monaghan) gets distracted and puts his hand on the grill, severely wounding himself. He is tended at home by Sammi (Emily Bergl), and he opens up about his experience in the army and having left his position. Later, Ian takes Mickey (Noel Fisher) to a baseball field where they had sex, and they have a tense fight, although Ian admits this was the best experience he had in a long time. Frank shares his feelings for Bianca to Veronica (Shanola Hampton), stating he does not want anything in return. Frank visits her again, but Bianca's sister refuses to let him inside. He calls her from her window, saying he can help her in her struggle despite not having much to offer.

Lip takes Joaquin to Helene, asking her for help. She calls an ambulance, but tells Lip that he needs to prioritize responsibilities and act up. Afterwards, Lip kicks Kevin out of the dorm room, returning with Veronica. Debbie and Derek have sex, but Debbie advises him not to use a condom.

Fiona meets with Sean (Dermot Mulroney), who bids farewell to his family. Ignoring Gus's calls, Fiona goes with Sean to a bar, where he gets into a fight with another man. Later, Fiona and Sean finally kiss.

Bianca reveals to Frank that her sister left because she chose not to get chemotherapy, and Frank promises to not get the treatment for her. Ian and Mickey return home, planning to have their first official date as couple. However, when they arrive, they discover that Sammi has called in army officials to inform them of Ian's desertion. Ian is arrested and taken away, just as Fiona arrives, and Sammi proclaims this is retaliation for Chuckie's imprisonment.

== Production ==
The episode was written by Sheila Callaghan.

The episode was written by supervising producer Sheila Callaghan and directed by Michael Uppendahl. It was Callaghan's sixth writing credit, and Uppendahl's first directing credit.

== Reception ==
=== Viewers ===
In its original American broadcast, "South Side Rules" was seen by an estimated 1.67 million household viewers with a 0.7 in the 18–49 demographics. This means that 0.7 percent of all households with televisions watched the episode. This was a slight increase in viewership from the previous episode, which was seen by an estimated 1.62 million household viewers with a 0.8 in the 18–49 demographics.

=== Critical reviews ===
"South Side Rules" received critical acclaim. Joshua Alston of The A.V. Club gave the episode an "A–" grade and commended the final scene, calling it "the best, most succinct thematic encapsulation of Shameless as there's been on the show." However, Alston expressed mixed feelings over the writers' overall handling of Sammi, and believed the character to be underdeveloped: ""Carl's First Sentencing" showed Sammi's anger over Chuckie's introduction to the industrial prison complex. But it was mostly played for laughs [and] undercut the seriousness of what was happening to Sammi. [...] Because of the audience's investment in Ian, especially with his relationship with Mickey in a relatively stable place, the vast majority of the audience is not going to see it from Sammi's perspective."

Allyson Johnson of The Young Folks gave the episode a 9 out of 10 rating and wrote "What we have here is good television. Shameless turns in what might be my favorite episode of the season (so far), with one it's [sic] most meditative installments to date." Johnson commented positively on the final scene, praising Cameron Monaghan's performance and the dramatic content: "It's a heart stopping moment of television where we realize that one of our beloved characters may be facing some very real consequences." Johnson also praised the continued exploration of Frank and Bianca's relationship, writing "[Frank] and Bianca make for a fascinating pair and William H. Macy getting to play things a bit more low key and underscored is a welcome change." Whitney Evans of TV Fanatic gave the episode a 4.5 star rating out of 5, and wrote of the final scene, "Sammi has officially eclipsed Frank as my least favorite character thanks to her cruel actions at the end of [the episode]. I understand she's hurting, but to take it out on Ian, who has literally done nothing to her, was truly abhorrent. With only a few episodes left, I'm betting Fiona and company will truly make her pay for this one."

David Crow's review for Den of Geek was largely negative, giving it a 2.5 star rating out of 5. Crow criticized Sammi's continued presence in the show, as he believed the Gallaghers' tolerance of Sammi to be unrealistic considering the fallout of the previous episodes. Crow considered the final scene to be "contrived" and "melodramatic" and wrote, "This latest betrayal is one that could have been prevented. [...] This was a low, low, low thing to do. But the worst aspect is that it should never have happened if the characters were behaving with the modicum of common sense they had in the first three seasons." Crow also disliked the development of Frank and Bianca's relationship, writing "Perhaps, I am a bit discouraged since Frank did so well last week at being a surprisingly good person to see him try to bed a woman younger than his oldest daughter, but it seems stranger still that we're meant to root for a Romeo who screwed "Butterface" out of a heart and life. Like the Gallaghers tolerating Sammi's presence post-Carl sentencing, this is an unlikely calm before a dramatic storm that will inevitably occur in the last two episodes of the season."
