= Tunguska (The X-Files) =

- The X-Files episode
- Episode no.: Season 4 Episode 8
- Directed by: Kim Manners
- Written by: Chris Carter; Frank Spotnitz
- Production code: 4X09
- Original air date: November 24, 1996
- Running time: 44 minutes

Guest appearances
- Mitch Pileggi as Walter Skinner; Nicholas Lea as Alex Krycek; William B. Davis as The Smoking Man; John Neville as Well-Manicured Man; Laurie Holden as Marita Covarrubias; Brendan Beiser as Pendrell; Fritz Weaver as Senator Sorenson; David Bloom as Stress Man; Malcolm Stewart as Dr. Sacks; Campbell Lane as Committee Chairman; Stefan Arngrim as Prisoner; Brent Stait as Timothy Mayhew; Dawn Murphy as 1st Customs Officer; Andy Thompson as 2nd Customs Officer; Phillip Heinrich as Assault Agent; Jano Frandsen as Older Agent

Episode chronology
← Previous "Musings of a Cigarette Smoking Man"	Next → "Terma"
- The X-Files season 4

"Tunguska" is the eighth episode of the fourth season of the American science fiction television series The X-Files. It premiered on the Fox network on November 24, 1996. It was directed by Kim Manners, and written by Frank Spotnitz and series creator Chris Carter. "Tunguska" featured guest appearances by John Neville, Nicholas Lea and Fritz Weaver. The episode helped explore the series' overarching mythology. "Tunguska" earned a Nielsen household rating of 12.2, being watched by 18.85 million people in its initial broadcast.

In the episode, FBI special agent Fox Mulder (David Duchovny) travels to Russia to investigate the source of a black oil contamination. His partner Dana Scully (Gillian Anderson) and assistant director Walter Skinner (Mitch Pileggi) are summoned to attend a United States Senate hearing on Mulder's whereabouts. "Tunguska" is a two-part episode, with the plot continuing in the next episode, "Terma"; it marked the return of the black oil storyline introduced in the third-season episodes Piper Maru and Apocrypha.

"Tunguska" was inspired by reports of evidence of extraterrestrial life possibly being found in the Allan Hills 84001 meteorite, while the gulag setting was inspired by the works of Aleksandr Solzhenitsyn. The story offered the writers a chance to expand the scale of the series' mythology globally, although production of the episode was described as troublesome and expensive.

== Plot ==
The episode opens in medias res to Dana Scully (Gillian Anderson) as she is brought before a Senate select committee to be questioned about the whereabouts of Fox Mulder (David Duchovny). Scully refuses to answer the committee's questions and attempts to read a statement denouncing the conspiracy within the government. Senator Sorenson threatens to hold Scully in contempt of Congress.

Ten days earlier, at Honolulu Airport, a courier returning from the Republic of Georgia (David Bloom) is searched by customs officers. One of the officers (Andy Thompson) removes a glass canister from the courier's briefcase and accidentally shatters it, exposing both men to the black oil. Meanwhile, in New York City, Mulder and Scully take part in an FBI raid against a domestic terrorist group. Mulder's tipster within the group is revealed to be Alex Krycek (Nicholas Lea), whom the terrorists released from the missile silo where he had been trapped. Krycek has turned against The Smoking Man (William B. Davis), and tells the distrustful agents that he can help expose him.

Krycek leads the agents to Dulles International Airport, where they try to apprehend a second courier carrying a diplomatic pouch from Russia. The courier leads the agents on a pursuit through the airport, but drops the pouch before escaping. The pouch is revealed to carry a seemingly unremarkable rock. Mulder has Krycek confined at the high rise apartment of Assistant Director Walter Skinner before having the rock analyzed at NASA's Goddard Space Flight Center. Dr. Sacks, a NASA scientist, tells Mulder and Scully that the rock is a prehistoric meteorite fragment that might contain fossilized alien bacteria.

Skinner is approached by the Smoking Man, who demands that the pouch be returned. The courier breaks into Skinner's apartment and searches for the pouch, only to be thrown off Skinner's patio by Krycek. Meanwhile, Dr. Sacks cuts into the fragment, but inadvertently releases the black oil inside; the organism penetrates the scientist's hazmat suit and puts him in a coma-like state. Mulder travels to New York to visit Marita Covarrubias (Laurie Holden), who reveals that the fragment originated from the Russian province of Krasnoyarsk and provides the documents needed to travel there. Mulder reluctantly brings along Krycek, who is fluent in Russian.

In Charlottesville, Virginia, the Smoking Man is admonished by the Well-Manicured Man (John Neville) when the latter learns about Mulder's travels. Skinner and the agents are subpoenaed to appear before Senator Sorenson's panel over the missing pouch; when Skinner questions Scully about Mulder's whereabouts, she is not forthcoming. Meanwhile, as Mulder and Krycek hike through the forests of Krasnoyarsk, the former theorizes that the fragment may be tied to the Tunguska event, a mysterious cosmic impact that occurred in the area in 1908. The two men come across a slave labor camp, but are captured by the taskmasters and thrown into a gulag.

Skinner and Scully meet with Senator Sorenson, who questions them on the death of the courier and the location of Agent Mulder. Mulder talks with a fellow prisoner who tells him that innocent people have been captured and brought to the gulag to be subjected to experiments. Immediately afterwards guards burst into the room and inject Mulder with a syringe. When Mulder awakens he is in a large room bound with chicken wire along with many other prisoners. Black material is dumped onto his face, infecting him with the black oil.

== Production ==
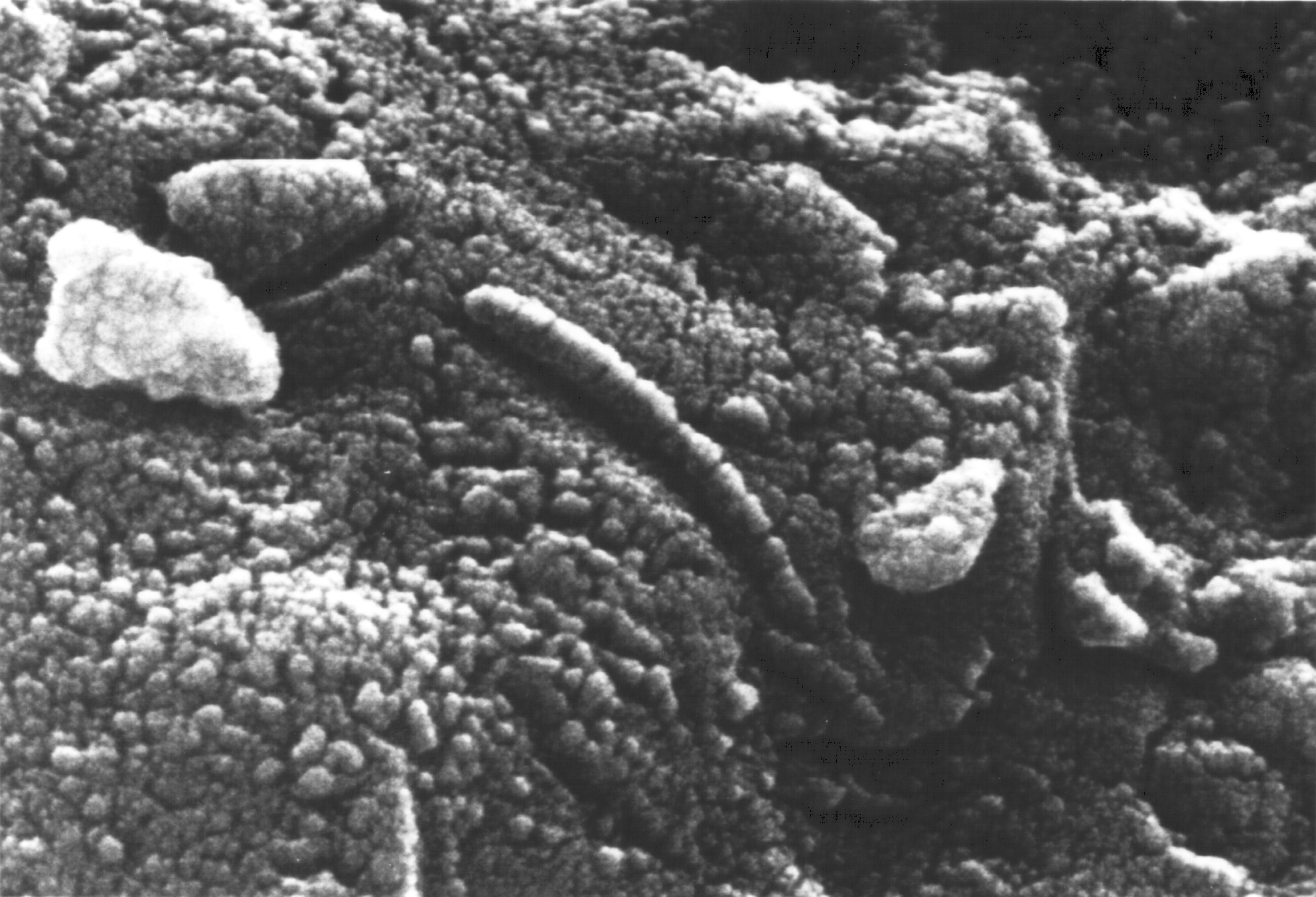
The possible discovery of life in the Allan Hills 84001 meteorite inspired the episode's script.

"Tunguska" and its follow-up "Terma" were conceived by the writers when they were trying to conceive a "big and fun canvas" to tell stories. They decided to create a story connected to the Russian gulags, which led to the "natural" idea that the Russians were experimenting separately from the Syndicate to create a vaccine for the black oil. Series writer John Shiban felt it was natural to create an arms race-like story between the United States and Russia, being that the Cold War had ended a few years earlier. The writers desired to expand the series' mythology globally, a concept that continued into the fifth season and the series' 1998 feature film adaptation. The idea of a conspiracy with a global reach was first broached in the series' second season, and it was felt that this two-part story was a good place to expand upon this, allowing the production crew to "stretch the limits" of their resources and imagination. The inspiration for the oil-containing rocks was NASA's announcement of possible evidence of extraterrestrial life in the Allan Hills 84001 meteorite; while the gulag scenes were based on Aleksandr Solzhenitsyn's books The Gulag Archipelago and One Day in the Life of Ivan Denisovich.

The scenes featuring the SWAT raid on a terrorist cell found to be harbouring Alex Krycek were filmed in a single night, requiring sixty individual film setups split between three camera crews working simultaneously. By dawn, only four of the sixty required shots had not been filmed, and these were later completed on a sound stage. Additional scenes shot for the episode featuring The Smoking Man and the Well-Manicured Man were cut due to time constraints. A scene featuring Scully briefing Skinner on the events of the episode was also cut, as it was felt that it was "redundant" within the narrative, repeating information that had already been shown to the audience. David Duchovny's father was present during production of the episode, leaving the actor to enjoy the shoot, although the crew described production as expensive and "stubbornly trouble-plagued". "Tunguska" marked the fourth appearance in the series by Malcolm Stewart, who had previously appeared in "Pilot", "3" and "Avatar".

== Reception ==
=== Ratings ===
"Tunguska" premiered on the Fox network on November 24, 1996. The episode earned a Nielsen household rating of 12.2 with an 18 share, meaning that roughly 12.2 percent of all television-equipped households, and 18 percent of households watching television, were tuned in to the episode. A total of 18.85 million viewers watched this episode during its original airing.

=== Reviews ===
"Tunguska" just doesn't work as well because it abandons the central idea of the conspiracy's American-ness, the idea that the American government is out there, ready to snatch you at a moment's notice and do nasty things to you, that said government has been up to this for a long, long time. The move to make the conspiracy a global one must have seemed smart at the time, but it also robs the series of something essential, of a sense that the worst monsters are the ones who purport to have our own best interests at heart.

—The A.V. Club's Emily VanDerWerff on the episode's scope.

"Tunguska" received mostly positive reviews from critics. Based on an advance viewing of the episode's script, Entertainment Weekly rated "Tunguska" an A−, praising the "arms race" plotline. Writing for The A.V. Club, Emily VanDerWerff rated the episode a B, noting that the move to a global scale detracted from the series' overall relevance. VanDerWerff felt that "the action setpieces in this episode and the next one are really terrific", and praised William B. Davis' portrayal of The Smoking Man. However, she described "Tunguska" as being "one of the first really unfocused mythology episodes in the show's run", and found the plot of the episode to not be moving the series forward enough, noting that "for the first time, Mulder feels less like he's driving the action and more like he's a messenger boy". David Duchovny described this episode, along with "Terma", as being action-heavy and "lots of fun".

=== Awards ===
"Tunguska" received a nomination for a CAS Award by the Cinema Audio Society for Outstanding Achievement in Sound Mixing - Television Series.

== Bibliography ==
- Edwards, Ted (1996). X-Files Confidential. Little, Brown and Company. ISBN 0-316-21808-1.
- Meisler, Andy (1998). I Want to Believe: The Official Guide to the X-Files Volume 3. Harper Prism. ISBN 0-06-105386-4.
