= Dustin Milligan =

Canadian actor (born 1985)

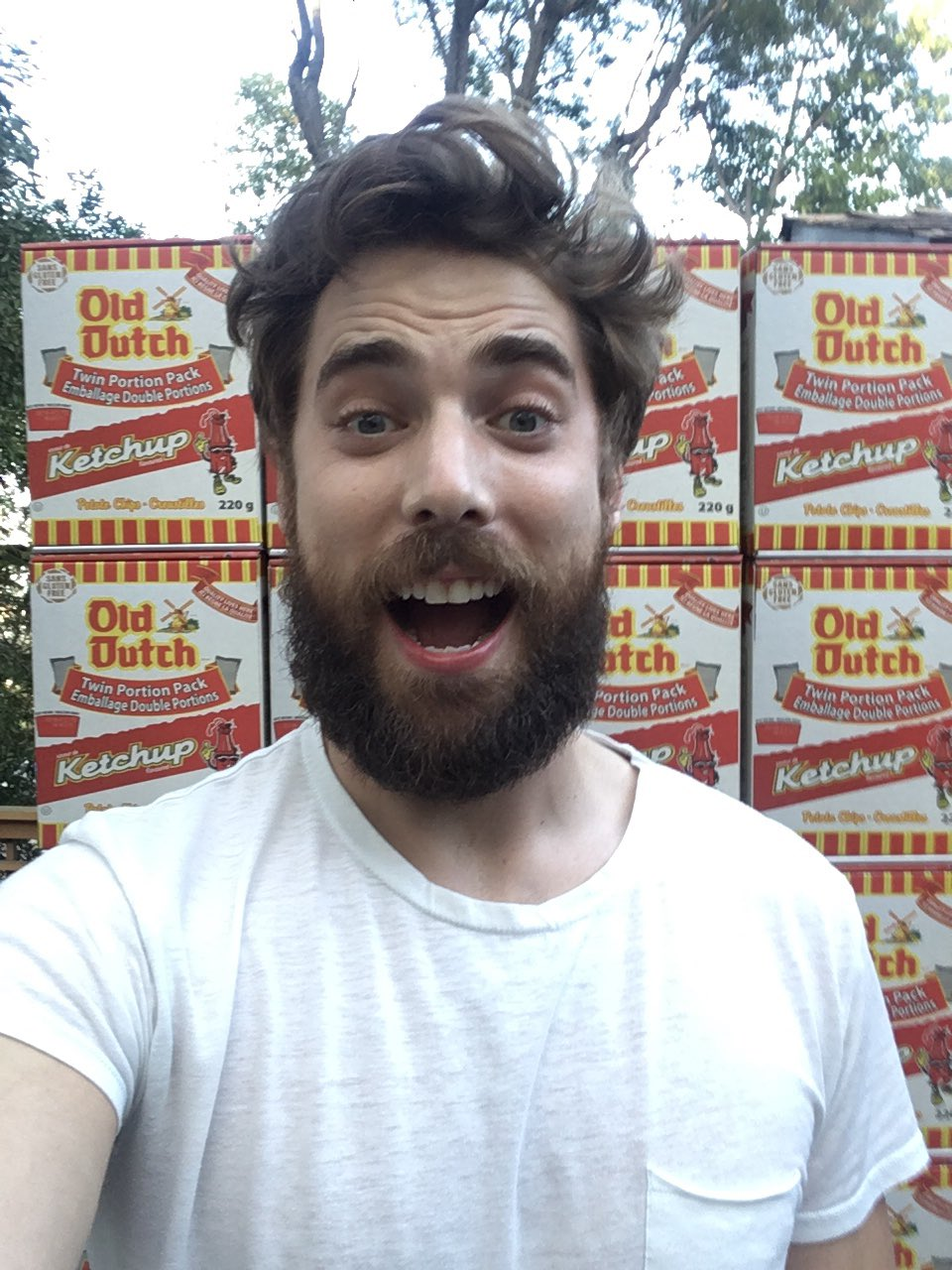
- Milligan in 2021
- Born: Dustin Wallace Milligan; July 28, 1985 (age 41); Yellowknife, Northwest Territories, Canada
- Occupation: Actor
- Years active: 2004–present
- Spouse: Amanda Crew
- Website: dustinmilligan.com

Dustin Wallace Milligan (born July 28, 1985) is a Canadian actor best known as Jack Snowman in Hot Frosty, Ted Mullens on Schitt's Creek, Ethan Ward on 90210, Tom Cummings in X Company, and Josh Carter on Rutherford Falls.

== Early life ==
Milligan was born in Yellowknife, Northwest Territories, the son of Jean Wallace, a former Yellowknife city councillor, and Brian Milligan.

== Career ==
Milligan is known for playing the role of Ted Mullens on Schitt’s Creek and Ethan Ward in The CW's 90210, a spin-off of the 1990s primetime drama Beverly Hills, 90210. He was written out of the show at the end of the first season.

His film credits include Final Destination 3 (2006), Slither (2006), The Butterfly Effect 2 (2006), In the Land of Women (2007), Butterfly on a Wheel (2007), The Messengers (2007), and Extract (2009).

Milligan starred in the short-lived primetime suspense drama Runaway, picked up by The CW for its inaugural season in September 2006, but cancelled in October after only three of nine episodes completed had been aired.

He starred in the Canadian network CTV's made-for-TV film Eight Days to Live playing The O.C. star Kelly Rowan's missing son. He has also had minor roles in the television series The Days, Andromeda, The Dead Zone, Alice, I Think, Supernatural and the CBC's Da Vinci's City Hall.

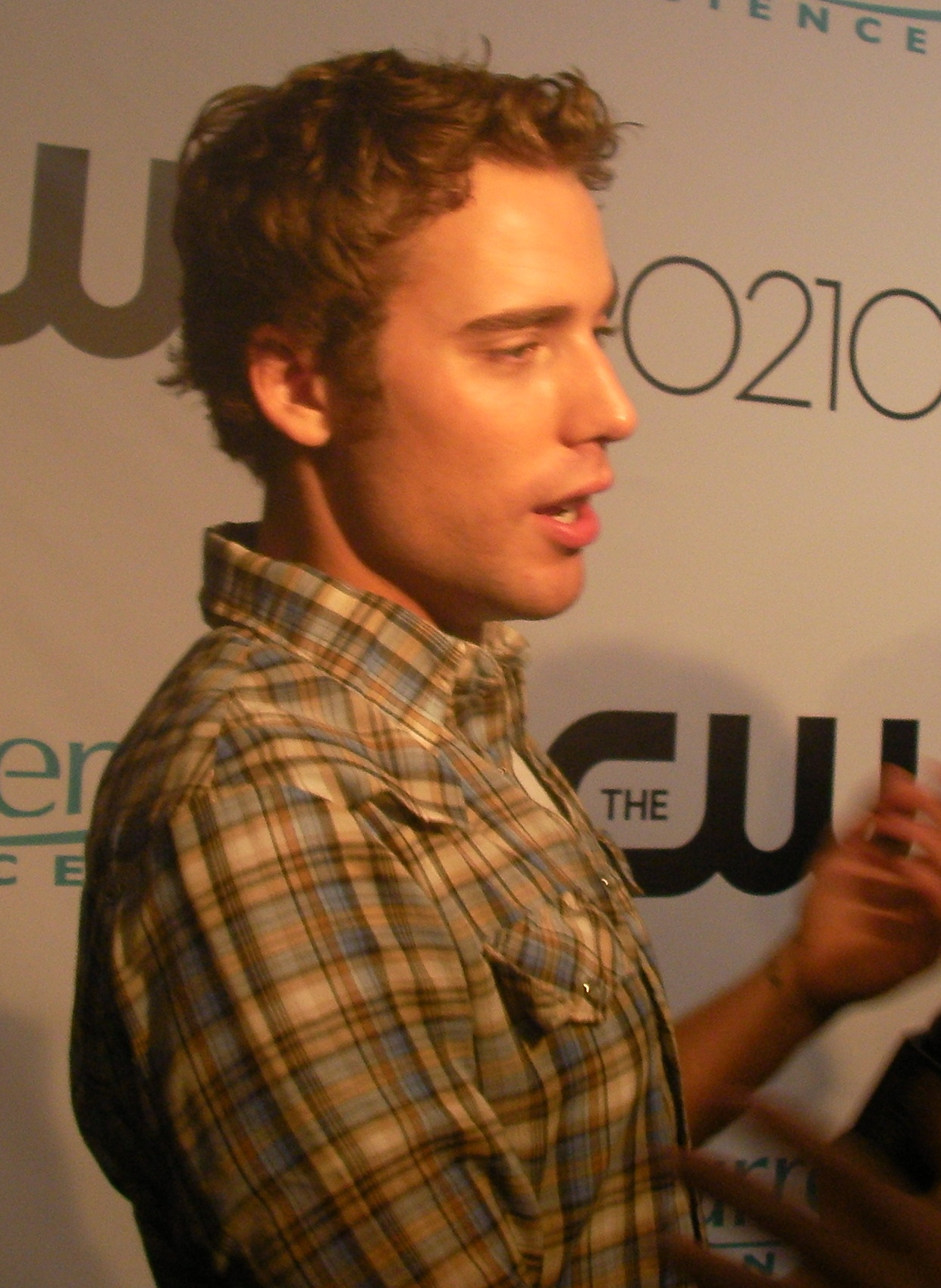
Milligan in 2008

In 2010, he played Kyle Halsted in the indie action crime drama film Repeaters, co-starring Amanda Crew. In 2011, he starred as Nick in the horror thriller shark movie Shark Night 3D. In 2011, he played Nick Nader in the suspense thriller The Entitled and Rory in the indie film Sisters & Brothers. In 2012, he starred as Sam Reed in the Lifetime Original Movie Love at the Christmas Table co-starring Danica McKellar. He appeared in the Funny or Die video Post Apocalypse News with Elisabeth Hower. In 2013, he played Callum Beck in the indie thriller Ferocious.

In 2014, Milligan starred as Detective Reverend Grizzly Night-Bear in a vintage 1970s "buddy cop" movie Bad City. He played the role of John in the James Wan produced horror film Demonic. In 2015, he landed the main role in the spy thriller TV show X Company, where he played Tom Cummings. He appeared in all six seasons of Schitt's Creek, playing the role of veterinarian Ted Mullens. He had a guest spot as Blaine in the TV show Silicon Valley. Later in 2015, he had a lead role as Ogden in the indie drama Sequoia co-starring Aly Michalka.

In 2016, he starred as Cory in the indie comedy film Me Him Her. The movie was written and directed by Max Landis. He starred as Nicholas Gray in the indie mystery thriller film Primary. He also starred in the film A Family Man. He plays the role of aggressive young recruiter at Blackridge who is training under Butler's character. He played the role of Sgt. Hugo Friedkin, a dimwitted government agent working with Riggins, in the BBC America series Dirk Gently's Holistic Detective Agency.

In 2020, Milligan was a contestant on RuPaul's Secret Celebrity Drag Race. After winning the mini-challenge, he selected Nina West as his drag mentor. He competed against Alex Newell and Matt Iseman and raised $20,000 for the charity Project HEAL.

== Personal life ==
In 2008-2010, Milligan dated his co-star in 90210, Jessica Stroup.

Milligan and his wife and actress Amanda Crew

Since 2010, Milligan is in relationship with actress Amanda Crew. In 2016, the couple welcomed a daughter. In 2024, according to reports, Crew and Milligan got married in secret.

== Filmography ==
=== Film ===
| Year | Title | Role | Notes |
|---|---|---|---|
| 2005 | The Long Weekend | Ed (14 and 15 years old) | |
| 2006 | Final Destination 3 | Marcus | |
| 2006 | Man About Town | Young Dooley | |
| 2006 | Nostalgia Boy | Nostalgia Boy | Short film |
| 2006 | Slither | Drawing Boy | |
| 2006 | The Butterfly Effect 2 | Trevor Eastman | |
| 2007 | Butterfly on a Wheel | Matt Ryan | |
| 2007 | In the Land of Women | Eric Watts | |
| 2007 | The Messengers | Bobby | |
| 2007 | Wannabe Macks | CJ | |
| 2009 | Extract | Brad Chavez | |
| 2010 | Eva | Lucien | |
| 2010 | Gunless | Corporal Jonathan Kent | |
| 2010 | Repeaters | Kyle Halsted | |
| 2010 | Tossers | Jimmy "The Lace" Santino | Short film |
| 2011 | Shark Night | Nick LaDuca | |
| 2011 | Sisters & Brothers | Rory | |
| 2011 | The Entitled | Nick Nader | |
| 2012 | The Campaign | College Frat Guy | Uncredited |
| 2013 | Ferocious | Callum Beck | |
| 2013 | No Clue | Danny Carwyn | |
| 2013 | The Legend of Sarila | Markussi (voice) | |
| 2014 | Bad City | Detective Reverend Grizzly Night-Bear | |
| 2014 | Sequoia | Ogden Clarke | |
| 2015 | Demonic | John Matthews | |
| 2015 | Milwaukee | Ugly Lamp Guy | |
| 2016 | A Family Man | Sumner Firestone | |
| 2016 | Me Him Her | Cory Isaacson | |
| 2016 | Primary | Nicholas Gray | |
| 2018 | A Simple Favor | Chris | |
| 2022 | Mack & Rita | Jack | |
| 2022 | The People We Hate at the Wedding | Dennis Bottoms | |
| 2024 | Hot Frosty | Jack Snowman | |
| 2024 | Operation Taco Gary's | Luke | |
| 2024 | Running on Empty | Randall | |
| 2024 | Shell | Devin | |
| 2024 | The Move | Todd | Short film |

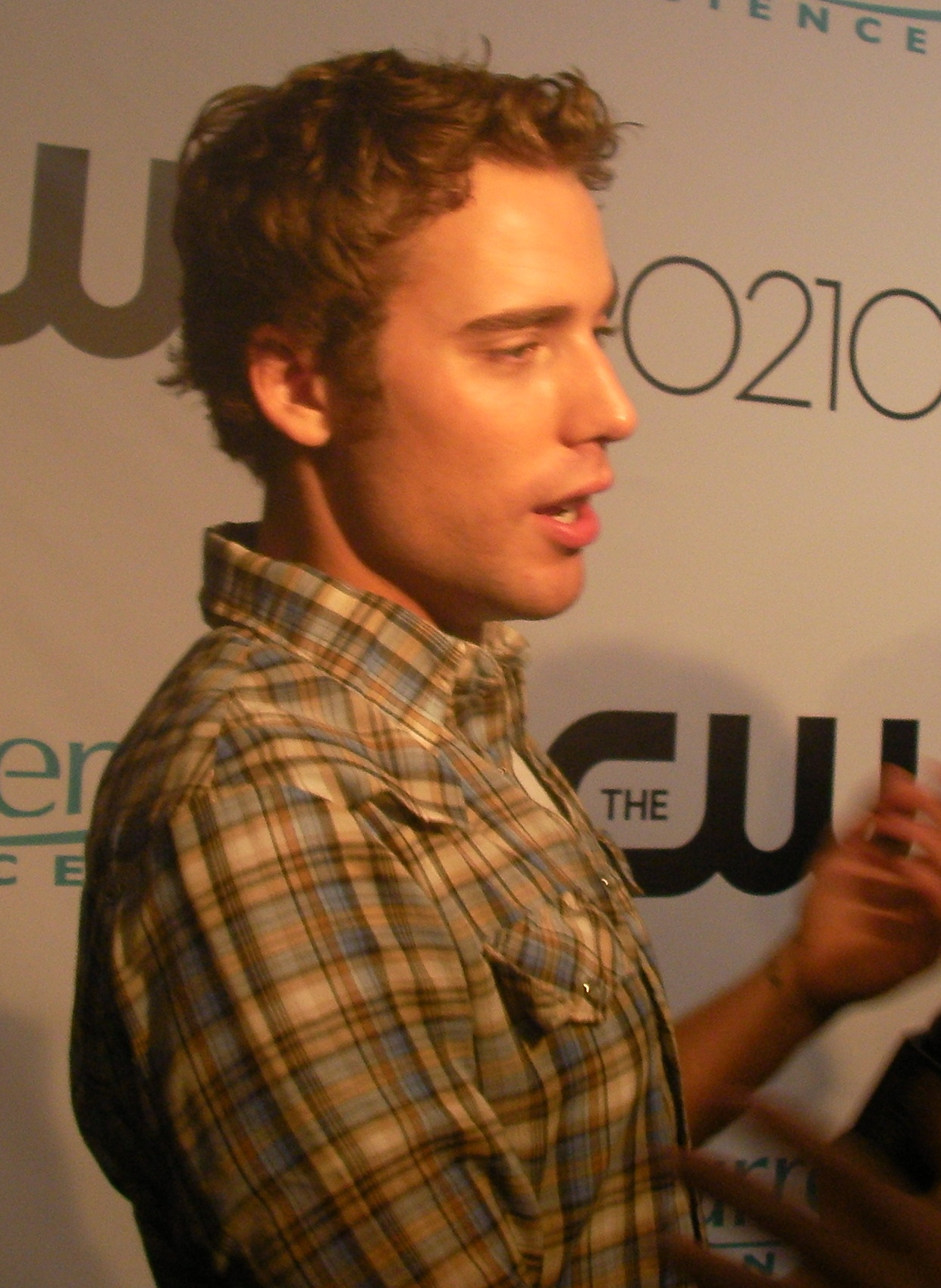
Milligan at the 90210 premiere party in Malibu on August 23, 2008

=== Television ===
| Year | Title | Role | Notes |
|---|---|---|---|
| 2004 | Perfect Romance | Rapper | Television film |
| 2004 | The Days | Steve Colter | 2 episodes |
| 2004 | Dead Like Me | Joey | Episode: "Death Defying" |
| 2004 | Andromeda | Lon | Episode: "So Burn the Untamed Lands" |
| 2005 | Hush | Billy | Television film |
| 2005 | Amber Frey: Witness for the Prosecution | Grocery clerk | Uncredited; television film |
| 2005 | A Perfect Note | Ripper | Television film |
| 2005 | Da Vinci's City Hall | Chad Markowitz | Episode: "Isn't Very Pretty But You Can Smoke It" |
| 2006 | Eight Days to Live | Joe Spring | Television film |
| 2006 | The Dead Zone | Randy | Episode: "Panic" |
| 2006 | Alice, I Think | Mark Conners | Episode: "What Would Jesus Do?" |
| 2006 | Runaway | Henry Rader/Jason Holland | Main cast; 9 episodes |
| 2007 | Reaper | Sam | |
| 2008 | About a Girl | Stan | Episode: "About a Homecoming" |
| 2008 | Supernatural | Alan J. Corbett | Episode: "Ghostfacers" |
| 2008–2009 | 90210 | Ethan Ward | Main cast (season 1); 24 episodes |
| 2009 | The Assistants | Himself | Episode: "The Pen" |
| 2012 | Call Me Fitz | Barry O'Neil | Episode: "Semen-Gate" |
| 2012 | Love at the Christmas Table | Sam Reed | Television film |
| 2013 | Motive | Felix Hausman | Episode: "Fallen Angel" |
| 2015–2020 | Schitt's Creek | Ted Mullens | Series regular; 42 episodes |
| 2015–2016 | X Company | Tom Cummings | Main role (2 seasons), 18 episodes |
| 2015 | Silicon Valley | Blaine | Episode: "Homicide" |
| 2016–2017 | Dirk Gently's Holistic Detective Agency | Sgt. Hugo Friedkin | Series regular |
| 2018 | Blindspot | Lincoln | Episode: "The Quantico Affair" |
| 2019 | Into the Dark | Gavin | Episode: "A Nasty Piece of Work" |
| 2020 | RuPaul's Secret Celebrity Drag Race | Himself / Rachel McAdamsapple | Episode: "Secret Celebrity Edition #103"; winner |
| 2021–2022 | Rutherford Falls | Josh Carter | Main cast |
| 2023 | FUBAR | Kyle | Episode: "Here Today, Gone To-Marrow" |
| 2027 | Committed | Peter Hooley | Main role |

=== Web ===
| Year | Title | Role | Notes |
|---|---|---|---|
| 2011 | Marcy | Perry | Episode: "Marcy Does Yoga" |
| 2014 | Math Bites | Various | 3 episodes |

=== Music videos ===
| Year | Title | Artist | Role | Ref. |
|---|---|---|---|---|
| 2011 | "Shark Bite Rap" | Cast of Shark Night | Himself | |
| 2013 | "Made in the USA" | Demi Lovato | The Boy | |
| 2014 | "Friday Night" | Godson featuring Jessa Garcia | Himself | |
