= The Entitled =

- Promotional film poster
- Directed by: Aaron Woodley
- Written by: William Morrissey
- Produced by: David Valleau
- Starring: Kevin Zegers
- Cinematography: David Greene
- Edited by: Matthew Hannam
- Music by: Tomandandy
- Release date: 6 September 2011
- Running time: 91 minutes
- Country: Canada
- Language: English

The Entitled is a 2011 Canadian hostage suspense film directed by Aaron Woodley. The film was released directly to DVD and Video on Demand. The Entitled is about three unemployed youngsters with antisocial inclinations and bleak future prospects who kidnap the kids of three rich dads for ransom.

== Plot ==
Paul Dynan (Kevin Zegers) and his mother Marsha Dynan (Nola Augustson) are unemployed. At school, two students Jenna (Tatiana Maslany) and Dean (Devon Bostick) are aware they are two of a kind, possessing malevolence towards the world around them. Paul, seducing Jenna and befriending Dean, comes up with a plan to kidnap three kids of wealthy families for ransom.

The scene shifts to a lake house where two men, Clifford Jones (Stephen McHattie) and Richard Nader (Ray Liotta) and Clifford Jones driver (Anthony Ulc) await a third man, and each of their kids. Elsewhere Jenna and Dean abduct the three kids Jeff (John Bregar), Nick (Dustin Milligan) and Hailey (Laura Vandervoort) and bring them to a house. Paul reappears after other arrangements, calls Clifford's house and demands 1 million dollars from each father to be wired to an offshore bank account. Scared, Clifford pays right away and advises Richard to do the same. Richard's transaction does not go through as his agent tells him he does not have enough money. Bob has not yet come and they are unable to reach him.

The kids are locked, blindfolded and tied in a basement. Paul is shown to light a cigarette while telling Jenna to keep watch. Dean, wanting to derive some fun for himself with victims, is disappointed when he's not assigned. Paul calls the fathers and learns that the one million dollars will not be coming from Bob, who has not yet arrived to receive the message. Aware that Paul has promised to kill the rich kids regardless of whether the ransom is paid or not, antisocial Jenna gets carried away and shoots Bob's son, Jeff. Overhearing the shooting, the fathers learn Jeff is dead. Paul agrees to two million dollars and warns that if the money does not make it to the account he will kill the remaining two. When Bob (Victor Garber) does arrive, the fathers try not to tell him Jeff is dead for fear of jeopardizing their own children's lives, but are somewhat conspicuous in their efforts. Bob sends his one million dollars only to later learn that he paid instead for Nick. Paul, unhappy with Jenna, tells his co-conspirators that his intention was not to shoot their hostages but to blow up the house. Meanwhile, Nick and Hailey, distraught by Jeff's death and that his body lies beside them, manage to free themselves. Nick, recognizing the location as his father's home, they run through the forest to Clifford’s house. The kidnappers discover the escape. Paul tells Jenna and Dean to find the kids, but only kill them if money is not received. Dean catches the kids in the woods and holds them at gun point. When the money comes in, Paul re-transfers it, calls the fathers and instructs them to stay put. He then calls Dean and tells him to let the kids go and rendezvous at the gas station as he has the money. Dean, upset about not being allowed to inflict damage, shoots Nick, loses his balance and falls over, discovering that the gun Paul gave him is loaded with blanks. The kids escape.

Jenna tracks the kids to the gas station. In self-defense and anger, Nick strangles Jenna. Nick and Hailey again escape and make it to Clifford’s house. Dean arrives at the gas station to find Jenna alive but injured on the ground. Frustrated and bloodthirsty, he kills her. Paul leaves the house, taking one of three beer bottles from the house. He confronts Dean at the gas station and reveals that he has framed Jenna and Dean. Paul kills Dean, makes it look like suicide, and goes to Clifford’s house. Paul is the Clifford driver son and he plays the victim of a struggle. While awaiting the police, Paul lights a match that illuminates Hailey's face. She is startled, but when the police arrive and question everyone, does not name Paul as a suspect. Hailey and Nick have never heard Paul's voice as a kidnapper. Paul leaves with his dad, watching the lights and police cordoning off the gas station.

== Cast ==
- Kevin Zegers as Paul Dynan
- Victor Garber as Bob Vincent
- Laura Vandervoort as Hailey Jones, daughter of Clifford Jones
- Dustin Milligan as Nick Nader, son of Richard Nader
- Devon Bostick as Dean Taylor
- Ray Liotta as Richard Nader
- Stephen McHattie as Clifford Jones
- Tatiana Maslany as Jenna
- Anthony Ulc as Frank
- John Bregar as Jeff Vincent, son of Bob Vincent
- Nola Augustson as Marsha Dynan
- Jim Codrington as Detective

== Production and reception ==
The film was shot mostly in Laurentian University, Sudbury, Ontario, Canada. The film was nominated for a Directors Guild of Canada Craft award in 2012.
