= Victor Frankenstein (film) =

2015 American science fantasy horror film by Paul McGuigan

- Theatrical release poster
- Directed by: Paul McGuigan
- Written by: Max Landis
- Based on: Frankenstein by Mary Shelley
- Produced by: John Davis
- Starring: Daniel Radcliffe; James McAvoy; Jessica Brown Findlay; Andrew Scott; Charles Dance
- Cinematography: Fabian Wagner
- Edited by: Andrew Hulme; Charlie Phillips
- Music by: Craig Armstrong
- Production companies: Davis Entertainment Company; Moving Picture Company
- Distributed by: 20th Century Fox
- Release dates: November 11, 2015 (Los Angeles); November 25, 2015 (United States)
- Running time: 110 minutes
- Country: United States
- Language: English
- Budget: $40 million
- Box office: $34.2 million

Victor Frankenstein is a 2015 American science fantasy horror film directed by Paul McGuigan, based on a screenplay by Max Landis. Inspired by Mary Shelley's 1818 novel Frankenstein; or, The Modern Prometheus, the film stars Daniel Radcliffe, James McAvoy, Jessica Brown Findlay, Andrew Scott, and Charles Dance.

Told from Igor's perspective, the film follows his transformation from a mistreated circus performer to the assistant of Victor Frankenstein, as they push the boundaries of science in a quest to create life.

Victor Frankenstein was released in the United States on November 25, 2015, by 20th Century Fox. It received generally negative reviews from critics and grossed $34.2 million worldwide against a production budget of $40 million.

== Plot ==
In 1860s London, medical student Victor Frankenstein attends a circus. He witnesses a hunchbacked clown use advanced anatomical knowledge to help save an injured aerialist, Lorelei. Intrigued, Victor rescues the abused hunchback from the circus, cures him of his deformity, and gives him the name "Igor Straussman"—taken from his absent roommate. Aided by Igor, Victor continues experiments to artificially create life, drawing the attention of Inspector Roderick Turpin, who views his work as heretical.

Victor's work leads to the creation of a monstrous chimpanzee-like creature named Gordon, assembled using organs from dead animals. Victor organizes a demonstration at his university which ends in a disaster when Gordon escapes and wreaks havoc. Victor and Igor manage to kill the creature, but the fallout causes Victor's expulsion. Meanwhile, Igor reconnects with Lorelei, now companion to a wealthy (and secretly gay) baron. This creates tension with Victor, who sees her as a distraction.

Victor, haunted by the death of his older brother Henry—a loss for which his father blames him—is approached by Finnegan, an affluent classmate. Finnegan offers funding for a more ambitious experiment: the creation of a humanoid being named "Prometheus". Igor grows concerned about the direction of Victor's work and Finnegan's motives, especially after discovering Victor used the eyes of the real Igor Straussman, who is revealed to have died from an overdose.

A police raid—led by Turpin—destroys Victor's lab. Turpin is maimed during the confrontation, losing a hand and an eye. Victor and Igor escape with Finnegan's help and are taken to his private estate in Scotland to continue their work. Igor, increasingly uneasy, is eventually cast out and nearly killed by Finnegan, who plans to weaponize Prometheus and dispose of Victor once the experiment is complete. Igor survives and is nursed back to health by Lorelei.

Igor and Lorelei travel to Scotland to stop Victor. As Victor prepares to bring Prometheus to life during a thunderstorm, Igor tries to dissuade him, but Victor proceeds. The electrical apparatus collapses, and Finnegan and many workers are killed. The creature is successfully animated, but Victor quickly realizes it lacks sentience and is not a resurrection of his brother. Turpin, now obsessed, arrives to confront them but is killed by Prometheus in a rage. Victor and Igor work together to destroy the creature by destroying its two hearts.

In the aftermath, Igor receives a letter from Victor, who has gone into hiding in the Scottish countryside. Victor apologizes and thanks Igor for his friendship, declaring him his "greatest creation". He hints at continuing his scientific work and suggests they may one day meet again.

== Cast ==
- James McAvoy as Victor Frankenstein, a medical student
- Daniel Radcliffe as Igor Straussman, a man with a large cyst who is rescued from the circus by Victor
- Jessica Brown Findlay as Lorelei, an aerialist-turned mistress who becomes Igor's love interest
- Andrew Scott as Inspector Roderick Turpin, an inspector who investigates Victor Frankenstein's experiments
- Charles Dance as Baron Frankenstein, the father of Victor Frankenstein
- Freddie Fox as Finnegan, the wealthy classmate of Victor
- Mark Gatiss as Dettweiler
- Callum Turner as Alistair
- Daniel Mays as Barnaby, the ringmaster of the circus that Igor formerly worked at
- Bronson Webb as Rafferty
- Spencer Wilding and Guillaume Delaunay as Prometheus, a prototype of Frankenstein's monster
- Adam Nagaitis as Winthrop (uncredited)

== Production ==
20th Century Fox first announced the project in 2011, with Max Landis attached to write the screenplay. Paul McGuigan was confirmed as director in September 2012. Daniel Radcliffe entered talks to play Igor that same month and officially joined the cast in March 2013. In July 2013, James McAvoy was cast as Victor Frankenstein, followed by Jessica Brown Findlay in September 2013.

The film's release schedule underwent several changes. Originally set for release on October 17, 2014, it was first delayed to January 16, 2015, then pushed back to October 2, 2015. In June 2015, the release was postponed again to November 25, 2015, a date previously assigned to The Peanuts Movie and The Martian.

Principal photography began on November 25, 2013, and concluded on March 20, 2014. Filming primarily took place in the United Kingdom, with soundstage work at Longcross Studios and Twickenham Film Studios, and location shooting at Chatham Historic Dockyard.

== Marketing ==
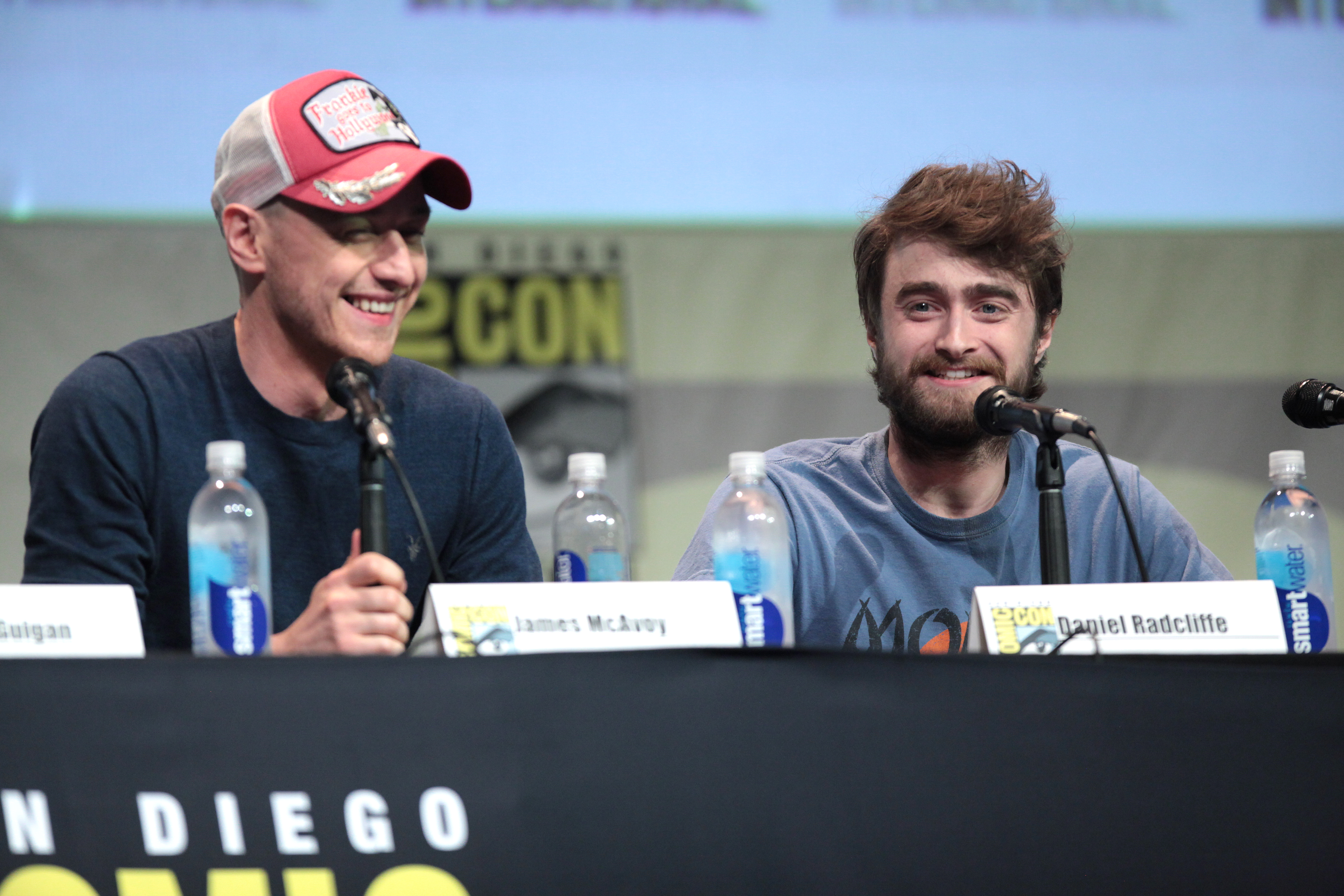
James McAvoy and Daniel Radcliffe at the 2015 San Diego Comic-Con to promote the film.

The first official trailer for Victor Frankenstein was released by 20th Century Fox on August 18, 2015.

== Reception ==
=== Box office ===
Victor Frankenstein grossed $5.8 million in North America and $28.5 million in other territories, for a worldwide total of $34.2 million against a production budget of $40 million.

The film was released in North America on November 25, 2015, during the Thanksgiving holiday, alongside Creed and The Good Dinosaur, as well as the wider expansions of Brooklyn, Spotlight, and Trumbo. It was initially projected to earn $12 million over its five-day debut, including $6–8 million during its opening weekend from 2,797 theaters. However, after taking in $175,000 from Tuesday night previews and $620,000 on its opening day, expectations were revised down to $3–3.7 million. The film ultimately grossed $2.4 million in its opening weekend and $3.4 million over the five-day period, setting a record at the time for the lowest opening for a film released in over 2,500 theaters; lower than XXX: State of the Union (2005) a decade earlier.

=== Critical response ===
On Rotten Tomatoes, the film holds an approval rating of 26% based on 138 reviews, with an average rating of 4.68/10. The website's consensus states: "A re-imagining without the imagining, Victor Frankenstein plays at providing a fresh perspective on an oft-told tale, but ultimately offers little of interest that viewers haven't already seen in superior Frankenstein films." On Metacritic, it has a weighted average score of 36 out of 100, based on 28 critics, indicating "generally unfavorable reviews". Audiences polled by CinemaScore gave the film an average grade of "C" on an A+ to F scale.

Empire awarded the film 4 out of 5 stars, calling it "a playful, postmodern sensibility that zaps new life into Shelley's 200-year-old Gothic masterpiece." Total Film was more reserved, rating it 3 out of 5 and noting that "each murky frame is bursting with grime and clutter... The result is far from monstrous but it's hardly divine, either."

Brian Tallerico of RogerEbert.com gave the film 1.5 stars out of 4, writing that it "has the mad energy of a creation assembled from spare parts" and that despite an ambitious tone, it ends up feeling "hollow". Variety described the film as "a revisionist buddy comedy" that becomes "less interesting the closer it sticks to the monster-making formula." Peter Bradshaw of The Guardian was similarly critical, calling it "a bizarre and confused reboot" and writing that "the giddy enthusiasm of McAvoy and Radcliffe only goes so far."

Alonso Duralde of TheWrap commented that the film's attempts to freshen the tale were undermined by "incoherent plotting and overwrought action." IGN gave it a 5.8/10, stating that it "aims for bold reimagination but lands closer to disjointed fan fiction." The New York Times said the film "adds kinetic style and a dash of humor but gets bogged down in hollow spectacle and recycled drama."

The Hollywood Reporter criticized the film for "favoring bombast over atmosphere," and wrote that it "suffers from the same problem as the monster itself—too many mismatched parts." David Ehrlich of IndieWire graded it a C−, stating it was "as stitched-together as its central creation, and only half as lively." Common Sense Media gave the film two stars, noting excessive violence and a confusing tone that strays far from the original source material. ReelViews' James Berardinelli called the film "a bloated and soulless experiment" and gave it two out of four stars.

In response to the low Rotten Tomatoes score, screenwriter Max Landis criticized the aggregator's methodology, arguing that the site reduces nuanced reviews into binary results, calling the approach "destructive" and "arbitrary".

== See also ==
- List of films featuring Frankenstein's monster
