= The Death and Return of Superman (film) =

2011 fan film

- Directed by: Max Landis
- Written by: Max Landis
- Produced by: Bryan Basham
- Starring: Max Landis; Morgan Krantz; Elden Henson; Elijah Wood; Mandy Moore
- Cinematography: Ryan Hailey
- Music by: Evan Goldman
- Production company: Adjacent LA
- Release dates: November 27, 2011 (Los Angeles premiere); February 3, 2012
- Running time: 17 minutes
- Country: United States
- Language: English
- Budget: $10,000

The Death and Return of Superman is a fan film by Chronicle writer Max Landis that was first shown in Los Angeles on November 27, 2011. It was later uploaded to YouTube in 2012. The film, as its title implies, is a monologue about "The Death and Return of Superman" storyline from DC Comics over parody-like sketches. The film was produced by Bryan Basham, creator of COPS: Skyrim, and features cameo appearances from a number of notable performers, including Elijah Wood, Mandy Moore, Elden Henson, Zach Cregger, Jimmi Simpson, Matthew Mercer, Jennette McCurdy, Simon Pegg, and Ron Howard.

== Plot ==
While drinking Johnnie Walker mixed with water, Max Landis talks about Superman and how he influenced the world of comic book superheroes until his fading popularity in the 1990s. DC Comics executives concluded that for Superman to be relevant again, he had to die. Landis describes the birth of Doomsday and the events that set up his battles with Superman until the deaths of both combatants. DC Comics shipped three million copies of Superman #75 worldwide, nearly all of which sold out within the first day of release.

Following Superman's funeral, DC Comics published the "Reign of the Supermen!" story arc, which introduced four characters claiming to be Superman: Hank Henshaw, Steel, Superboy, and the Eradicator. Henshaw later defeated the other three Supermen and destroyed Coast City, causing Hal Jordan to lose his sense of reasoning, become Parallax, and kill most of the Green Lantern Corps. Henshaw continued his reign of terror until the real Superman appeared and defeated him. It was revealed that Superman had emerged from a "healing coma", identical to death except temporary. Superman's resurrection was met with outrage from fans who felt betrayed by DC Comics; sales of Superman's comics declined and have never recovered.

As he pours himself another drink, Landis recalls a lesson learned from his father John Landis about how to kill a vampire. After the younger Landis lists ways mentioned in vampire literature like a stake through the heart and sunlight, his father explains that writers can kill vampires any way they want because vampires do not exist. In essence, the "Death of Superman" story arc did not kill Superman; instead, it made death irrelevant in comics, as hundreds of comic book characters would die and resurrect multiple times in the years to come.

== Cast ==
- Max Landis as himself

- Kelsey Gunn as young Max Landis

- Morgan Krantz as Superman
- Elden Henson as Doomsday
- Mandy Moore as Lois Lane
- Elijah Wood as Hank Henshaw / Cyborg Superman
- Matt Bennett as Superboy
- Dustin Romero as The Eradicator
- Barry Brisco as Steel
- Zach Cregger as Hal Jordan
- Whitney Moore as Batman
- Jennifer Newman as Robin
- Jezlan Moyet as Nightwing and a Fraternity partygoer
- Sarah Shahi as Titania
- Brian Morrison as Guardian
- Brad Gage as Guy Gardner
- Ashley Hinshaw as Power Girl
- Chloe Dykstra as Ice
- Luke Barats as Blue Beetle
- Joe Bereta as Booster Gold
- Zena Grey as Lana Lang
- Jimmi Simpson as Mad Scientist
- Chris Hardwick as himself
- Kit Willesee as the '30s Woman
- Yuri Lowenthal as the '30s Man
- Taliesin Jaffe as a Fraternity partygoer
- Matthew Mercer as a Fraternity partygoer
- Coy Jandreau as a member of the Green Lantern Corps
- Jennette McCurdy as Eradicator Folks
- Elizabeth Gillies as Eradicator Folks

Ron Howard makes a cameo appearance as Max's son, and Simon Pegg appears as John Landis; Landis had done this style of video before in his web series Cooking With Comics, as well as his videos Vague Recollections of Watchmen and Drunk Comic Book History: The Robins.
