= Andy Thompson (theatre professional) =

Canadian artist (born 1970)

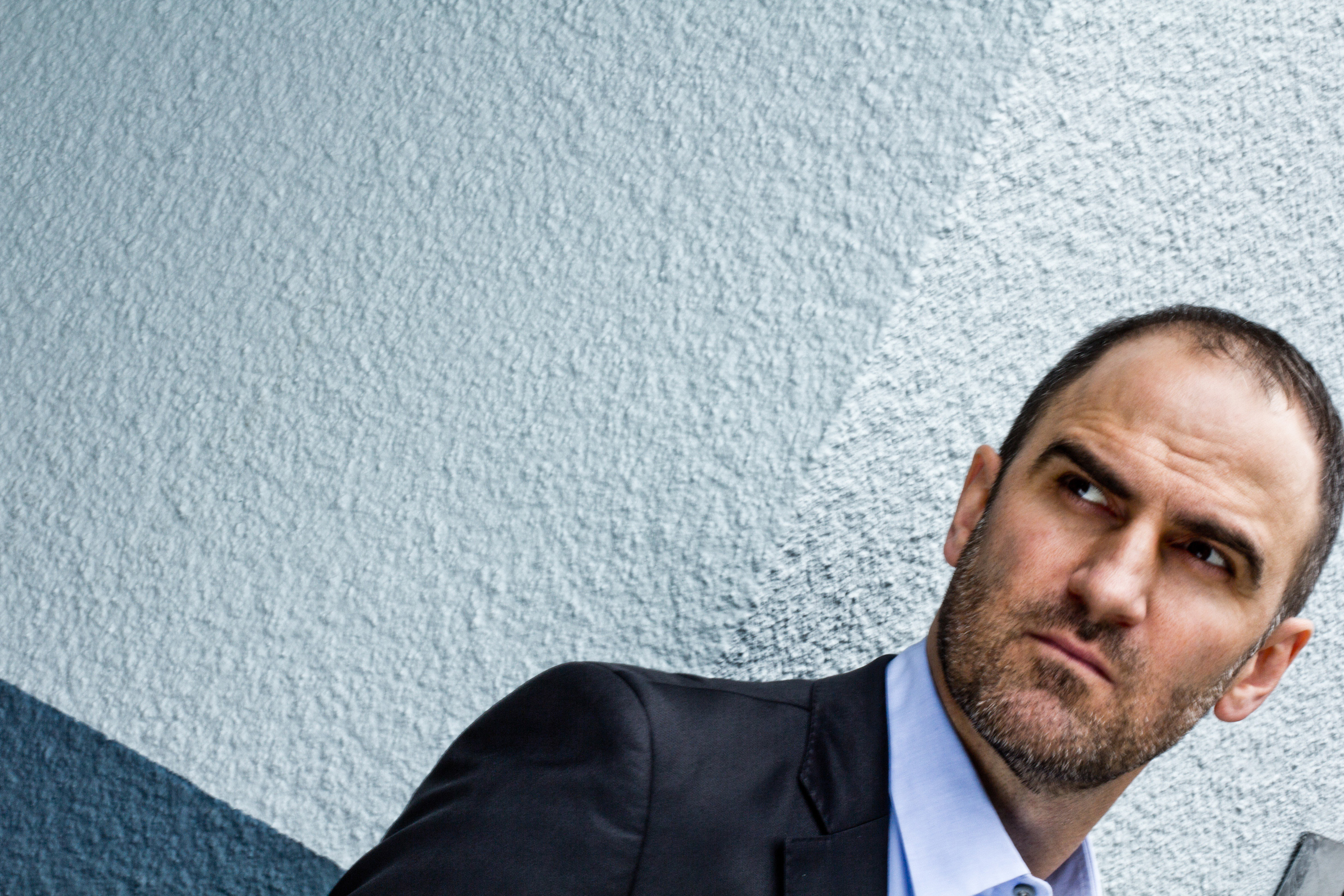
- Thompson in 2011
- Born: 1970 (age 55–56); Chilliwack, British Columbia, Canada
- Education: Studio 58
- Occupations: The Virtual Stage artistic director, actor, playwright, filmmaker

Andy Thompson (born 1970) is a Canadian actor, theatre artist, filmmaker and teacher.

Thompson was born and raised in Chilliwack, British Columbia. He received his theatre arts diploma in acting from Studio 58 in Vancouver, British Columbia, Canada in 1993. He is the founder of the multi-media theatre company The Virtual Stage.

The Virtual Stage and Electric Company Theatre's 2008 production of No Exit, which Thompson co-produced and performed in, won a Jessie Award for Outstanding Production and the Critics' Choice Innovation Award. He co-produced, co-wrote and performed in the short film The Provider, which won the 2010 Bloodshots 48-Hour Horror Filmmaking Competition before going to the 2011 Cannes Film Festival, where it was given a "Coup de Coeur" as one of the best short films from Canada. Also in 2011, his entry in the international Film Racing Grand Prix short film competition, the super-hero spoof Repair Man, won 3rd place overall, and was the top-ranking Canadian film of the contest.

In 2013, Thompson's science fiction musical comedy Broken Sex Doll received good reviews. The show won seven Jessie Richardson Theatre Award nominations, including Outstanding Production and Outstanding Direction for Thompson.

Thompson is the creator of The Zombie Syndrome, an acclaimed annual, site-specific, interactive, theatrical event in Vancouver in which audience members with smartphones are endowed as elite agents on a mission to save the world from a deadly zombie plague. The event, produced by The Virtual Stage, began in 2012 under the original title The Zombie Syndrome. It went on to be nominated for two Jessie Richardson Theatre Awards: "Critics' Choice Innovation Award" and "Significant Artistic Achievement: Outstanding Logistical and Technical Innovation". In 2013, a sequel called The Zombie Syndrome: On Death Island took place on Granville Island and was praised by critics.

His TV appearances include roles on Supernatural, Riverdale, A Million Little Things, Yellowjackets, and Upload, where he has acted alongside Jared Padalecki, KJ Apa, David Giuntoli, Christina Ricci, and Robbie Amell, respectively. Thompson was in Antlers.

The University of the Fraser Valley lists him as one of its "Top 40 Alumni".

== Filmography ==
=== Feature films ===
Year	Title	Role	Notes
2023	Woman of the Hour	Bob	
2023	Totally Killer	Mr. Parr	
2022	Christmas Class Reunion	Principal Holt	TV movie
2021	The Perfect Recipe	David Riley	TV movie
2021	Highway to Heaven	Mr. Delvecchio	TV movie
2021	Corner Office		
2021	Antlers	Father Weaver	
2021	Broken Diamonds	Lawyer	
2020	Cats & Dogs 3: Paws Unite	Paw Street Market Manager	
2019	Elsewhere	Father	
2019	A Christmas Duet	Mr. Vignau	TV movie
2019	Mystery 101	Eldon Parnell	TV movie
2019	Critters: A New Binge	Rideshare Guy	
2018	Darrow & Darrow 3	Auctioneer	TV movie
2018	Garage Sale Mystery: The Mask Murder	Caller	TV movie
2017	Signed, Sealed, Delivered: Home Again	Auctioneer	TV movie
2017	Betting On The Bride	Fred	TV movie
2017	Little Pink House	City Council Member	
2016	The BFG	Footman #3	
2016	Hearts of Spring	Henry	TV movie
2014	Cruel & Unusual	Counselor	
2012	Finding Mrs. Claus	Evan Knight	TV movie
2005	The Long Weekend	Officer Garcia	
2004	The Chronicles of Riddick	Scalp Taker	
2003	The Delicate Art of Parking	Craig Manke	
2003	Agent Cody Banks	CIA Assistant	
2003	A Guy Thing	Guy In Washroom	
2001	The Wedding Dress	Haswell	TV movie
1998	The Hunted	Fielder	TV movie

=== Television ===
Year	Title	Role	Notes
2023	Goosebumps	Owner/Manager	Episode 1.06
2023	Bones of Crows	Dr. Spencer	CBC mini series; episode 1.02
2023	Yellowjackets	Larry (Manager)	Episode 2.01
2021	Guilty Party		Episode 1.03
2021	Upload		Episode 2.02
			Episode 2.03
2020	Upload	Professor	Episode 1.02
			Episode 1.05
			Episode 1.07
			Episode 1.09
			Episode 1.10
2020	Charmed	Morgue Technician	Episode 2.16
2020	The Magicians	Professor Frank	Episode 5.09
2020	When Calls the Heart	Dr. Atwater	Episode 7.03
2019	Riverdale	Funeral Director	Episode 4.01: Chapter Fifty-Eight: In Memoriam
2019	Critters: A New Binge	Ride Share Guy	Episode 1.03: Party Time
2019	The Flash	Dr. Bruce Bonwitt	Episode 5.18: Godspeed
2018	A Million Little Things	Mr. Taylor	Episode 1.05: The Game of Your Life
			Episode 2.11
2018	Van Helsing	Count Laughula	Episode 3.06: Like Suicide
2018	Take Two	Auctioneer	Episode 1.12: It Takes a Thief
2018	Trial & Error	Dr. Rock N' Law	Episode 2.07: A Family Affair
			Episode 2.08: Bad Instincts
			Episode 2.10: Barcelona
2017	Legends of Tomorrow	Cecil B. DeMille	Episode 3.06: Helen Hunt
2017	Hit The Road	Lecturer	Episode 1.04: School Spirit
2016	Impastor	Lionel	Episode 2.08: My Little Brother's Little Brother's Keeper
2016	No Tomorrow	Stern Executive #1	Episode 1.02: No Crying In Baseball
2016	Second Chance	Modified Bartender	Episode 1.06: Palimpsest
2014	Continuum	Anderson	Episode 3.03: Minute to Win It
2014	Arrow	Tony Daniel	Episode 2.03: Broken Dolls
2013	Level Up	Cactus Kaiser	Episode 2.11: Dante and Angie's Mascot Skating Video
2013	Supernatural	Librarian	Episode 8.13: Everybody Hates Hitler
2012	Fringe	Observer	Episode 5.01: Transilience Thought Unifier Model-11
2012	True Justice	Kristov Polanyi	Episode 2.05 Dirty Money
			Episode 2.10 Dead Drop 2
2010	Fringe	Pilot	Episode 3.06: 6955 kHz
2005	Masters of Horror	Bill	Episode 1.07: Deer Woman
2005	The Collector	Pinky	Episode 2.09: The Tour Guide
2005	Stargate SG-1	Calvin	Episode 8.15: Citizen Joe
2003	Dead Like Me	Morgue Attendant	Episode 1.02: Dead Girl Walking
2002	Wolf Lake	Hank	Episode 1.07: Leader of the Pack
2002	UC: Undercover	Computer Technician	Episode 1.11: Teddy C
2001	Just Deal	Paramedic	Episode 2.10: Women's Work
2001	Night Visions	Frank	Episode 1.10: Rest Stop/After Life
2001	Freedom	Prison Guard	Episode 1.09: Return
2000	So Weird	Hardware Clerk	Episode 3.11: Beeing There
2000	Skullduggery	Russian Cop	
1999	So Weird	VP	Episode 1.06: Simplicity
1999	Continuity	Waiter	
1999	The New Addams Family	Antonio	Episode 1.48: Catastrophia's Career
1996	The X-Files	Customs Agent	Episode 4.08: Tunguska

=== Short films ===
Year	Title	Role	Notes
2014	Boy Meets Boy	Steven	
2012	Cruel & Unusual		Producer, director & Editor
2011	Repairman		Producer, director, writer & Editor
2011	Mayor Mulligan (Makes a Mistake)		Producer, director, writer & Editor
2011	The Provider	Mr. Connor	Actor, producer & Writer
2010	Stupid Chainsaw Tricks	Ted	
2009	The Present		Producer, writer & Director
2008	The Valet	The Rich Guy	
2003	Headshot	The Boss	
2002	Dial 'A' for Alphaman	Alphaman	
2002	Thrown	The Man	Actor, producer & Writer
2002	Tantric Logic	Yendor	
2000	Cinderella: Single Again	Nervous Prince	
1997	LVCOB	Linus	
1997	Road Movie	Branco	
1996	Cautionary Tales for Children		
1996	Laugh	Steve	
1996	Misinterpretations	Arlington	
1996	The Psychedelic Raincoat	Nathan	
1995	Blood Under My Skin	Paul	
1995	Morning Glory	Sam	
1993	The Atheist and the Jew	Jew	

== Recognition ==
Jessie Award Nominations

- Outstanding Performance by an Actor in a Leading Role: Small Theatre (1998/9) - Reading Hebron
- Outstanding Performance by an Actor In a Supporting Role: Small Theatre (2002/3) - The Fall
- Outstanding Original Play or Musical: Small Theatre (2002/3) - The Birth of Freedom
- Sydney Risk Award for Outstanding original Script by an Emerging Playwright (2002/3) - The Birth of Freedom
- Significant Artistic Achievements, Small Theatre, Outstanding Performance by an Ensemble (2006/7, with 12 other cast members) - The Shoes That Were Danced to Pieces
- Significant Artistic Achievements, Small Theatre, Outstanding Technical Design (2006/7, with 6 other people) - Spank!
- Significant Achievement Award, Small Theatre, Video Design & Editing (2008/9, with Bojan Bodruzic) - No Exit
- Outstanding Direction: Small Theatre (2012/13) - Broken Sex Doll

Film Awards

- Bloodshots 48-Hour Horror Filmmaking Contest (2010) Best Film, Best Costume Design & Cannes Short Film Corner (2011) Coup de Coeur distinction (co-producer, co-writer, actor) - The Provider
- Vancouver Film Race (2010) Best Writing, Best Costume Design, Best Set Design, 4th Runner Up (co-writer, co-producer, director, editor) - Mayor Mulligan
- International Film Racing Grand Prix (2011), 3rd Place Overall & top-ranking Canadian film (co-writer, director, producer) - Repair Man

== Plays ==
- The Birth of Freedom (2002)
- SPANK! (2006)
- 1984 (2011) (multi-media stage adaptation of Nineteen Eighty-Four by George Orwell)
- The Zombie Syndrome (2012)
- Broken Sex Doll (2013)
- The Zombie Syndrome: On Death Island (2013)
