= Deer Woman (Masters of Horror) =

- Masters of Horror episode
- DVD cover
- Episode no.: Season 1 Episode 7
- Directed by: John Landis
- Written by: John Landis; Max Landis
- Production code: 107
- Original air date: December 9, 2005

Guest appearances
- Brian Benben; Sonja Bennett; Anthony Griffith; Cinthia Moura; Andy Thompson; Alex Zahara

Episode chronology
| ← Previous "Homecoming" | Next → "Cigarette Burns" |

"Deer Woman" is the seventh episode of the first season of Masters of Horror. Directed by John Landis, the episode originally aired in North America on December 9, 2005.

== Plot ==
In a lodge, several drunk truckers are finding respite in booze and women. One trucker leaves the lodge to urinate and overhears a fellow trucker screaming in pain inside a truck. He checks the truck but leaves after it goes quiet. Moments later, the door is kicked open.

Detective Dwight Faraday (Brian Benben) is a burned-out detective whose main priority is dealing with animal attacks. He and his partner, Officer Jacob Reed (Anthony Griffith), are sent to investigate a strange call about a possible animal attack. The officers are shown the truck from the opening sequence, and determine that the door was kicked out by something extremely powerful. Faraday then questions the locals and gets to know that the victim was last seen with a beautiful Native American woman before he died. Faraday realizes that the victim was trampled from the groin upward, and figures the man died in a state of arousal.

Elsewhere, a businessman encounters a beautiful silent Native-American woman (Cinthia Moura), who takes the man to a hotel. The businessman becomes the second victim. The same woman then seduces a blond Southern man. In the morning, Reed and Faraday go down to the morgue to examine the cadaver of the businessman, and the same markings found on the previous victim are noted. The team makes the perpetrator out to be a deer, and find out that the same woman was seen with him before he died.

On his way home, Faraday passes a Native American mural, where images of the Deer Woman are portrayed. Faraday and Reed travel to a casino on a local Indian reservation, where they learn from an Indian bartender about the Native American legend of the Deer Woman: a malevolent forest spirit resembling a beautiful young woman with deer legs, who sexually arouses and kills men just for the thrill of it. The open-minded Faraday believes the story, but the skeptic Reed doesn't and wanders off. Reed runs into the Deer Woman, and takes her home.

Faraday calls and informs Reed that he's found old news reports from over 100 years ago in which eleven loggers were found trampled to death in the woods. Reed tells Faraday that he's got a woman with him. Suspicious, Faraday asks Reed if he's seen her feet or legs. Reed suddenly realizes that the woman is the Deer Woman and yells to Faraday to send backup. The Deer Woman overhears and attacks Reed. Faraday races to Reed's apartment, but finds Reed already dead. Faraday then shoots the Deer Woman in the shoulder. Examining her body, he pulls up her long skirt to reveal deer legs. Reviving, the wounded and angry Deer Woman kicks him across the room and flees. Faraday gives chase in his car, catching up to the Deer Woman and ramming his car into her, pinning her to a tree. He shoots her several times, until she suddenly disappears without a trace. Faraday slumps down next to his totaled car, and mumbles "Animal attack" with a giggle as other police arrive.

== Cast ==
- Brian Benben as Dwight Faraday
- Anthony Griffith as Officer Jacob Reed
- Cinthia Moura as The Deer Woman
- Sonja Bennett as Dana
- Julian Christopher as Chief Einhron
- Don Thompson as Detective Fuches
- Alex Zahara as Detective Patterson
- Andy Thompson as Bill

== Allusions ==
- While talking to his superiors, Faraday speaks about a creature which terrorized London in 1981 and was shot in Piccadilly Circus. This is a reference to John Landis' 1981 film An American Werewolf in London.
- In the Indian casino there is a mention of Murph and the Magictones playing, as a reference to The Blues Brothers, another John Landis film.

== DVD and Blu-ray ==
The DVD was released by Anchor Bay Entertainment on June 27, 2006. The episode was the fifth to be released on DVD. The episode appears on the second volume of the Blu-ray compilation of the series.

The DVD includes interviews with actors Brian Benben and Anthony Griffith.
