= Chronicle (film) =

2012 American found-footage psychological thriller superhero film by Josh Trank

- Theatrical release poster
- Directed by: Josh Trank
- Screenplay by: Max Landis
- Story by: Josh Trank; Max Landis
- Produced by: John Davis; Adam Schroeder
- Starring: Dane DeHaan; Alex Russell; Michael B. Jordan; Michael Kelly; Ashley Hinshaw
- Cinematography: Matthew Jensen
- Edited by: Elliot Greenberg
- Production companies: 20th Century Fox; Davis Entertainment Company; Dune Entertainment
- Distributed by: 20th Century Fox
- Release dates: January 28, 2012 (Gérardmer Film Festival); February 3, 2012 (United States)
- Running time: 83 minutes
- Country: United States
- Language: English
- Budget: $12-15 million
- Box office: $126.6 million

Chronicle is a 2012 American film (Note: Often described as a found footage film, blending elements of superhero, science fiction, and psychological thriller.) directed by Josh Trank in his feature-length directorial debut, and written by Max Landis. It follows three Seattle high school seniors—bullied Andrew (Dane DeHaan), his cousin Matt (Alex Russell), and the popular Steve (Michael B. Jordan)—who form a bond after gaining telekinetic powers from an unknown object and using them for fun, until Andrew begins going down a darker path.

Chronicle premiered at the Gérardmer Film Festival on January 28, 2012, and was released in the United States on February 3, by 20th Century Fox. The film grossed $127 million against a budget of $12-15 million. It received generally positive reviews, and received a nomination for Best Science Fiction Film at the 39th Saturn Awards.

== Plot ==
In Seattle, teenager Andrew Detmer is bullied in school, abused by his alcoholic father Richard, and his mother Karen has cancer. The family struggles with medical debt after Richard loses his firefighter job. Andrew’s only friend is his cousin Matt Garetty. Andrew buys a video camera and begins a video diary of his life.

Matt invites Andrew to a party to help him mingle, but he leaves after his filming causes an altercation with another attendee. Popular student Steve Montgomery asks Andrew to record a large hole he and Matt found in the woods. They go down the hole and find a glowing crystalline object. The object reacts violently, and the camera shorts out.

A few days later, Andrew, Matt, and Steve develop telekinetic abilities. Unable to revisit the hole after authorities close it, they use their powers for pranks, but after Andrew accidentally pushes a rude motorist into a lake, the trio agree to Matt's suggestion to exercise restraint when using their powers.

After Steve discovers that the trio can fly, they agree to travel around the world together after graduation, with Andrew especially eager to visit Tibet. Steve persuades Andrew to use his powers for a magic act at the school talent show, impressing their classmates. Andrew enjoys his new popularity at a house party, but the night ends badly when he drunkenly vomits on a classmate he intended to have sex with, and Steve accidentally offends him while trying to lighten the mood.

After discovering Andrew’s hidden camera, Richard confronts him, believing he has squandered money meant for school and for Karen's medical treatments. The confrontation escalates until Andrew loses control and uses his powers against Richard, resulting in a violent altercation that forces him to flee his home. Overwhelmed with emotion, he flies into a thunderstorm, where Steve finds him, having telepathically sensed Andrew's distress. Despite Andrew's desire for solitude, Steve refuses to leave but is struck and killed by lightning.

In the aftermath of the party, Andrew faces social ostracism again. He retaliates against a bully using his telekinetic abilities and begins to see himself as an apex predator—stronger and justified in his aggression. Matt attempts to warn Andrew of the consequences, but their argument escalates into a fight. Andrew overpowers Matt, demanding that he stay out of his life.

Desperate to save his ailing mother, Andrew disguises himself in his father's firefighting gear, using his powers to rob a gang and a gas station. During the latter robbery, an explosion occurs, resulting in Andrew being hospitalized under police custody. Richard visits his hospital room and reveals that Karen died while he was searching for Andrew. Consumed by grief and anger, Richard holds Andrew responsible for her death. Andrew then unleashes his powers, demolishing the hospital room.

Matt, sensing Andrew's turmoil, rushes to the hospital with his girlfriend Casey after learning about the explosion. He finds Andrew publicly flying as he prepares to drop his injured father and intervenes to save Richard. Matt pursues Andrew to the Space Needle and tries to reason with him, to no avail. During the confrontation, Matt also rescues Casey, who was trapped in the car after Andrew had lifted it into the air and then dropped it suddenly. The pair fight across the city, destroying buildings and vehicles, until Andrew completely loses control. Recognizing that he is beyond saving, Matt fatally impales him with a statue spear.

In the aftermath, Matt travels to Tibet, carrying Andrew's camera. He records a final message expressing sorrow for his friends’ fates, asserting that Andrew was not inherently bad, and vowing to find out how they got their powers no matter how long it takes. After pointing the camera towards a distant Tibetan monastery, he leaves the camera behind as he flies away.

== Cast ==
- Dane DeHaan as Andrew Detmer
- Alex Russell as Matt Garetty
- Michael B. Jordan as Steve Montgomery
- Michael Kelly as Richard Detmer
- Ashley Hinshaw as Casey Letter
- Bo Petersen as Karen Detmer
- Anna Wood as Monica
- Rudi Malcolm as Wayne
- Luke Tyler as Sean
- Crystal-Donna Roberts as Samantha
- Adrian Collins as Costly
- Grant Powell as Howard
- Armand Aucamp as Austin
- Nicole Bailey as Cala

== Production ==
=== Development ===
Josh Trank had conceived the idea for Chronicle in high school and spent the following years generating ideas for the film. Up-and-coming screenwriter Jeremy Slater had collaborated with Trank while working on an unmade spec script. By 2010, Slater had moved on, leading to Trank contacting Max Landis, who agreed to co-write the film. The first draft of the script was written in three weeks after Landis had pitched the film behind Trank's back. Trank's original draft had the character of Steve being hit by a plane and dying in the middle of the second act. Landis removed this from his revisions, which "solved the entire second act". 20th Century Fox bought the rights to the project and greenlit the film with Trank serving as director in January 2011. Miles Teller auditioned for a role but was turned down as he had appeared in another found footage film, Project X.

=== Production ===
For budgetary reasons, the film was shot primarily in Cape Town, South Africa, with Film Afrika Worldwide, as well as in Vancouver, Canada. Trank cited the films Akira, Carrie and The Fury as influences on Chronicle. Filming started in May 2011 and continued for 18 weeks, ending in August 2011. Cinematographer Matthew Jensen used the Arri Alexa video camera to shoot the film and Angenieux Optimo and Cook s4 lenses. Post-production techniques were used to give it a "found footage" look. A cable cam rig was used for a shot in which the character Andrew levitates his camera 120 feet into the air. The Arri Alexa camera was mounted on a skateboard to simulate Andrew's camera sliding across a floor. Stuntmen were suspended from crane wire rigs for flying scenes, with green screen special effects used for closeups of the actors. Andrew's video camera in the movie is a Canon XL1 MiniDV, and he later switches to an HD camera that resembles a Canon Vixia HF M30. His "Seattle" bedroom is actually a set that was constructed on a film studio stage in Cape Town. Due to vehicles driving on the left side of the road and having steering wheels on the right side in South Africa, American-style vehicles had to be shipped in for the production. DVD dailies were provided to the director and cinematographer by the Cape Town firm HD Hub.

According to Josh Trank, Max Landis was banned from set during production and Trank has not spoken to him since 2012. Trank confirmed this on Twitter in light of Landis' sexual and emotional abuse accusations.

== Release ==
Chronicle opened in 2,907 theaters in the United States and Canada on February 3, 2012. Chronicle was released on DVD and Blu-ray Disc on May 15, 2012. The film was released on DVD and a special "Lost Footage" edition for Blu-ray, which contains additional footage that was not shown in theaters.

== Reception ==
=== Box office performance ===
Box office watchers expected the film to gross $15 million for its opening weekend, the Super Bowl weekend, while Fox projected to receive around $8 million. By its first day the film had earned an estimated $8.65 million and finished the weekend as the top film with $22 million, surpassing The Woman in Black ($21 million) and The Grey ($9.5 million) to become the fourth-highest Super Bowl debut, and up until May 2026, it had topped Jaws as the highest opening for a young director. Chronicle opened as a number one hit internationally, opening in 33 foreign markets such as Australia, China, and the United Kingdom, where it earned the most with $3.5 million. The film grossed $64.6 million in the United States and Canada, and $62 million in other territories, for a worldwide total of $126.6 million.

=== Critical response ===
On Rotten Tomatoes, the film has an approval rating of 85% based on 184 reviews and an average rating of 7.1/10. The site's critical consensus reads, "Chronicle transcends its found-footage gimmick with a smart script, fast-paced direction, and engaging performances from the young cast." On Metacritic, the film has a weighted average score of 69 out of 100 based on reviews from 31 critics, indicating "generally favorable" reviews. Audiences polled by CinemaScore gave the film an average grade of "B" on an A+ to F scale.

Chicago Sun-Times film critic Roger Ebert gave the film three and a half stars out of four, saying, "From [the] deceptively ordinary beginning, Josh Trank's Chronicle grows into an uncommonly entertaining movie that involves elements of a superhero origin story, a science-fiction fantasy and a drama about a disturbed teenager.” Empire critic Mark Dinning gave the film four stars out of five, saying that it is "a stunning superhero/sci-fi that has appeared out of nowhere to demand your immediate attention." Total Film gave the film a five-star review (denoting 'outstanding'): "Believable then bad-ass, it isn't wholly original but it does brim with emotion, imagination and modern implication." Peter Travers of Rolling Stone wrote: "Despite a gimmicky premise, Chronicle fuels its action with characters you can laugh with, understand and even take to heart." Peter Debruge of Variety wrote: "Unlike other mock documentaries, which unconvincingly pass themselves off as real, Chronicle cleverly embraces the format as shorthand for a new kind of naturalism, inviting audiences to suspend disbelief and join in the fantasy of being able to do anything with their minds." Todd McCarthy of The Hollywood Reporter called it "A clever twist on superpowers and hand-held filmmaking that stumbles before the ending."

On the negative side, Andrew Schenker of Slant Magazine gave the film two stars out of four, saying that the film, "offers up little more than a tired morality play about the dangers of power, rehashing stale insights about the narcissism of the documentary impulse."

=== Awards ===
The film was nominated for Best Science Fiction Film at 39th Saturn Awards, but lost to The Avengers.

Year	Nominee / work	Award	Result
2012	Chronicle	Golden Trailer Award for Best Most Original Trailer	Won
2012	Chronicle	Golden Trailer Award for Best in Show	Nominated
2012	Chronicle	IGN Summer Movie Award for Best Sci-Fi Movie	Nominated
2012	Chronicle	IGN Summer Movie Award for Best Movie Poster	Nominated
2012	Dane DeHaan	Golden Schmoes Awards for Breakthrough Performance of the Year	Won
2013	Chronicle	Saturn Award for Best Science Fiction Film	Nominated

== Cancelled sequels ==
Following its successful release, steps toward production of a sequel were taken. Fox hired Landis to write the script for it, but the involvement of Trank as director was unclear. It was reported in October 2012 that Fox was not happy with the script, but in April 2013, Landis said that Fox liked the script—which would be darker in tone—and production was moving along. However, in July 2013, Landis stated that new writers had taken over to write the film, and in March 2014, Fox hired Jack Stanley to write.

Trank commented in 2020 that following the experience of making Chronicle, he was never on board with a sequel. While he thought the sequel script was "fine", he felt that it had "nothing to do with why I wanted to do" the original film, and he did what he could to stall progress on it. "I really didn't ever want to see Chronicle 2 happen. That was my worst nightmare. First of all, I'm not doing it. Second, if somebody else does it, then you know it's gonna be a piece of shit."

In August 2021, a female-led sequel was officially announced by producer John Davis. It will be set 10 years after the events of the first film and deal with topics such as fake news and coverups. There have been no further updates since this announcement.

== See also ==
- Carrie, the first published novel by Stephen King that follows a telekinetic teenage girl.
- Akira, a manga series that involves a teen boy gaining telekinesis.
- Modern Problems, a 1981 dark comedy film where a man is granted the power of telekinesis after being exposed to nuclear waste.
