= Me Him Her =

- Promotional release poster
- Directed by: Max Landis
- Written by: Max Landis
- Produced by: Peter Saraf; Marc Turtletaub
- Starring: Luke Bracey; Dustin Milligan; Emily Meade
- Cinematography: Ross Riege
- Edited by: Joe Landauer
- Music by: Andrew Dost
- Production company: Big Beach Films
- Distributed by: FilmBuff
- Release dates: June 5, 2015 (Seattle International Film Festival); March 4, 2016 (United States)
- Running time: 98 minutes
- Country: United States
- Language: English

Me Him Her is a 2015 American comedy film written and directed by Max Landis, in his directorial debut. The film stars Luke Bracey, Dustin Milligan, and Emily Meade. The film had its world premiere at the Seattle International Film Festival on June 5, 2015. The film was released in a limited release and through video on demand on March 11, 2016, by FilmBuff.

== Plot ==
Twentysomething drifter Cory arrives in Los Angeles to help his semi-famous TV star friend Brendan take his first steps out of "The Closet".

== Cast ==
- Luke Bracey as Brendan Ehrlick
- Dustin Milligan as Cory Isaacson
- Emily Meade as Gabbi
- Angela Sarafyan as Heather
- Geena Davis as Mrs. Ehrlick
- Scott Bakula as Mr. Ehrlick
- Alia Shawkat as Laura
- Jake McDorman as Griffin
- Rebecca Drysdale as Kris
- Casey Wilson as Cynthia
- Kyle Bornheimer as Steve
- Miles Fisher as Scotty
- Frank Cappello as "Scrot" Dobfim
- Chris Hardwick as "Culk" Didip
- Kyle Mooney as "Moot" Morezit
- Haley Joel Osment as Himself
- Lance Henriksen as The Stranger
- Max Landis as Party Bystander

== Production ==
In November 2012, it was announced that Max Landis would direct the film in his directorial debut, for Big Beach Films, with production planned to begin in spring or summer 2013. It was also announced that Peter Saraf and Marc Turtletaub will produce the film. In July 2013, it was announced that Luke Bracey, Dustin Milligan, and Emily Meade had been cast in the film. In August 2013, it was announced that Angela Sarafyan had been cast in the film as Heather Frost. In October 2013, it was announced that Haley Joel Osment had been cast in the film, appearing as a fictionalized version of himself. Scott Bakula and Geena Davis also co-star as Brendan's parents.

== Controversy ==
According to set costumer, Tasha Goldthwait (daughter of Bobcat Goldthwait), Max Landis created a hostile workplace that included sexual assault and harassment. Landis quickly began subjecting Goldthwait to what she described as "physical, sexual, and verbal abuse." "He would talk about his penis all the time to me, brag about the size of it." She continued, "On set he would touch me all the time, he would pick me up and turn me upside down and carry me around set. My shirt would come above my face and I'd be exposed. At one point we were on set with people around and he pushed me down and got on top of me on a bed. I raised my voice and told him to get off of me, and eventually managed to get him off."

== Release ==
The film has received mixed reviews from critics, receiving a 50% rating on Rotten Tomatoes. The film had its world premiere at the Seattle International Film Festival on June 5, 2015. On Metacritic, it has a weighted average score of 39 out of 100, based on 6 critics, indicating "generally unfavorable reviews".

In January 2016, FilmBuff acquired distribution rights to the film. The film was released in a limited release and through video on demand on March 11, 2016.
