= Shark Night =

2011 film

- Theatrical release poster
- Directed by: David R. Ellis
- Written by: Will Hayes; Jesse Studenberg
- Produced by: Chris Briggs; Mike Fleiss; Lynette Howell
- Starring: Sara Paxton; Dustin Milligan; Chris Carmack; Katharine McPhee; Donal Logue; Joshua Leonard; Joel David Moore
- Cinematography: Gary Capo
- Edited by: Dennis Virkler
- Music by: Graeme Revell
- Production companies: Sierra Pictures; Incentive Filmed Entertainment; Silverwood Films; Next Entertainment
- Distributed by: Rogue
- Release date: September 2, 2011 (United States)
- Running time: 90 minutes
- Country: United States
- Language: English
- Budget: $25 million
- Box office: $41.4 million

Shark Night (advertised as Shark Night 3D) is a 2011 American horror film directed by David R. Ellis and written by Will Hayes and Jesse Studenberg. It stars Sara Paxton, Chris Carmack, Katharine McPhee, Alyssa Diaz, Dustin Milligan, and Joel David Moore. The film, which was negatively received by critics and grossed $40 million worldwide, was released in RealD 3D and Digital 3D. This was Ellis's final film before his death.

== Plot ==
Jess goes for a swim in the lake. Her boyfriend scares her and takes her bra off. He leaves and she goes to retrieve it. She is then attacked and devoured by a shark.

At Tulane University, Gordon and Nick are in their dorm when Malik bursts in. Malik tells them that he got a B+ on an exam and that they are going to Sara Palski’s house for the weekend to celebrate. As the three walk out, Malik says he is going to marry his girlfriend, Maya. Maya pulls up in a car with Beth. Blake and Sara arrive. The kids drive toward the lake and stop at a bait shop. They meet Dennis Crim and Red. The seven college kids drive toward the lake until Sheriff Sabin appears. Malik, Maya, Nick, and Blake take the boat out to go water skiing. Malik is attacked by a shark and loses his arm. Maya, Nick, and Sara take him in the boat to the hospital. Malik is still bleeding from his arm, leaking blood into the water. A shark bumps the boat and devours Maya. The other three are forced to jump off the boat as the steering and brakes stop working.

By night, Red and Dennis appear and offer to take two people to the hospital. Beth and Gordon decide to go. While on the way Dennis explains that he and Red put the sharks in the lake. He then shoots Gordon in the arm. Gordon swims towards a tree and climbs it but is caught by a shark. Beth gets thrown into a net and gets attacked and killed by a pack of cookiecutter sharks.

Blake tells Malik that Maya is dead and in a burst of rage, Malik tries to kill the shark responsible. Nick notices a camera attached to the shark. Blake tells the others he is taking Malik to a hospital on Sara’s WaveRunner. As they drive toward the hospital, Malik sees a Great White Shark following them. He sacrifices himself and is killed. As Blake tries to escape, the shark jumps out of the water and decapitates him.

Sheriff Sabin arrives at the house, where he notices the dead shark on the shore. He radios for backup. Nick passes out, knocking over a container of chicken noodle soup that the sheriff had. Sherman, the dog eats it. Sara overhears on the radio about Beth’s death. She and Nick are kidnapped by Dennis and the sheriff.

Nick wakes up tied to a chair. He panics as the sheriff explains that Sabin, Red, Dennis, and a bait store clerk were heavily influenced by Shark Week. They decided to record people getting brutally devoured by sharks. Sabin cuts Nick’s leg and spills gasoline. Nick uses his lighter to burn the rope to free himself. He then throws it at the sheriff who catches on fire. The sheriff falls into the lake and is devoured by a Sand Tiger Shark.

On the boat, Dennis chops up fish and dumps the blood and guts all over Sara who is in a shark cage. Nick jumps aboard with a dart gun aimed at Red’s head as he demands that Dennis bring Sara back up. Dennis agrees, but then pulls out a knife and throws it, hitting Red in the heart. Nick throws the body overboard. Dennis and Nick fight. Nick knocks Dennis into the water and brings Sara up out of the water. Dennis grabs a lever and pulls it re-submerging the cage.

The two start to fight again and a shark appears. Dennis gets his leg tangled up in the rope attached to the cage and is eaten. Nick dives down to retrieve a weapon from the ship and kills the shark. Nick and Sara make it back to the boat along with the dog.

== Cast ==
- Sara Paxton as Sara Palski
- Dustin Milligan as Nick LaDuca
- Chris Carmack as Dennis Crim
- Katharine McPhee as Beth Mazza
- Joel David Moore as Gordon Guthrie
- Donal Logue as Sheriff Greg Sabin
- Joshua Leonard as Red
- Sinqua Walls as Malik Henry
- Alyssa Diaz as Maya Valdez
- Chris Zylka as Blake Hammond
- Jimmy Lee Jr. as Carl
- Damon Lipari as Keith
- Christine Quinn as Jess
- Kelly Sry as Wonsuk
- Tyler Bryan as Kyle

== Production ==
Principal photography took place in the fall of 2010 in Louisiana around the Ark-La-Tex and at Caddo Lake in Uncertain, Texas.

The sharks featured in the film were animatronic sharks built by Edge Innovations, who previously built sharks for movies such as Deep Blue Sea, Austin Powers in Goldmember, and even the Orca in Free Willy. According to Walt Conti, the head of Edge Innovations, two models for each shark were built, one "attacker" and one "swimmer", each of which required very different internal mechanisms. "Sharks are this total contrast of stealthy, cruising lurking and these intense bursts of power," Conti says. "We split those two behaviors into two different types of models, and optimized each to do one of those things best."

Although the movie was always going to be titled Shark Night 3D overseas, Ellis fought for a name change for the North American release, at one point wanting to release the film under the title Untitled Shark Thriller 3D. Bloody Disgusting would later compare the proposed title of the film to Ellis's previous film Snakes on a Plane (2006).

"In the End" by Fade is the theme song for the Japanese version.

== Reception ==
Shark Night received negative reviews from critics. Rotten Tomatoes reports that the film holds a 19% approval rating from 75 critics, with an average score of 3.42/10. The critics consensus reads, "A joyless excursion into the water that doesn't even produce good gore or nudity thanks to the neutered PG-13 rating." The film has a weighted average score of 22 out of 100 on Metacritic, indicating "generally unfavorable" reviews.

== See also ==
- List of killer shark films
