= Max Landis =

American filmmaker (born 1985)

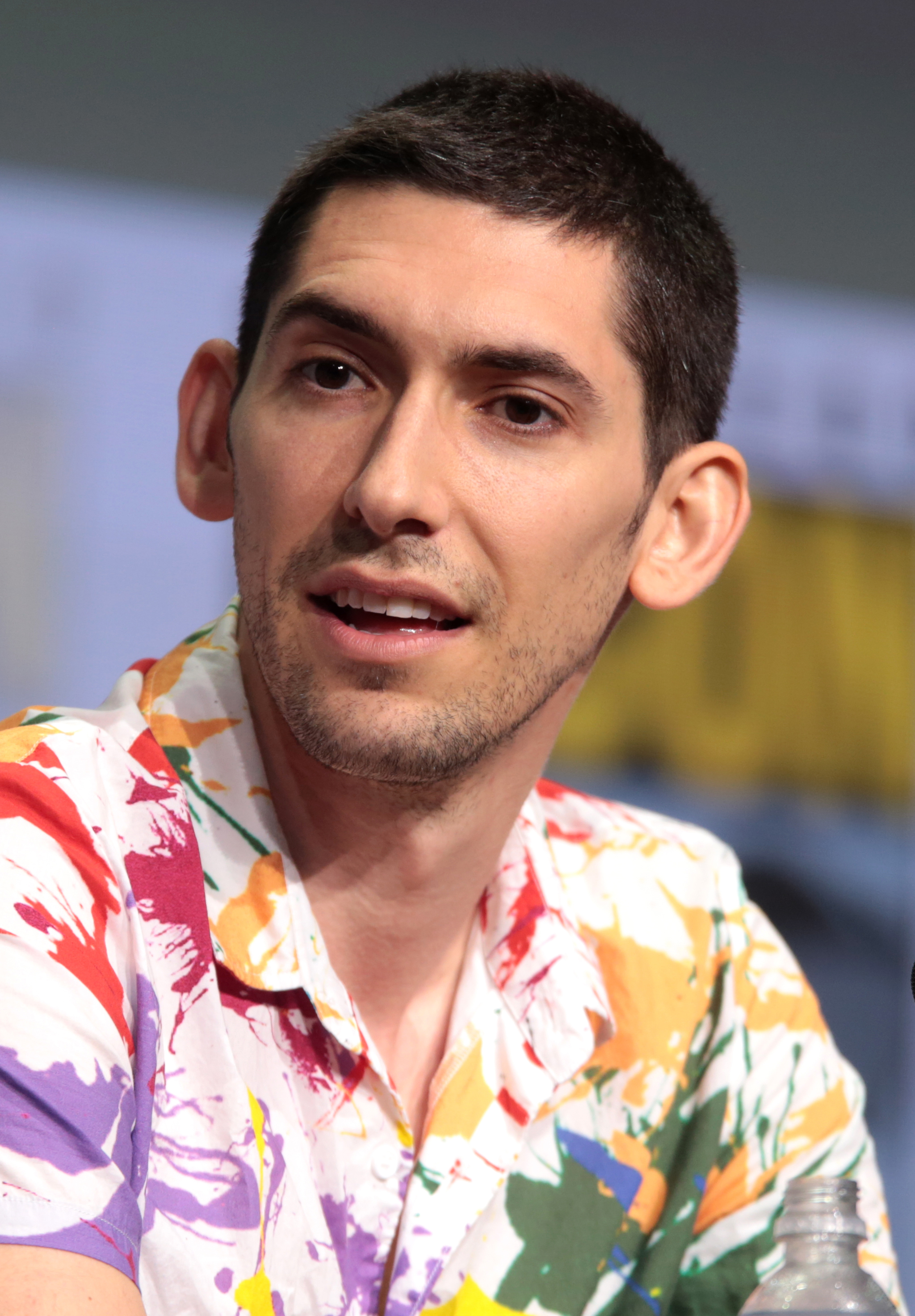
- Landis at the 2017 San Diego Comic-Con
- Born: August 3, 1985 (age 41); Beverly Hills, California, U.S.
- Occupations: Director; producer; screenwriter
- Years active: 1996–present
- Parents: John Landis (father); Deborah Nadoolman Landis (mother)

Max Landis (born August 3, 1985) is an American filmmaker. He is the son of director John Landis. He wrote scripts for the films Chronicle (2012), American Ultra (2015), Victor Frankenstein (2015), and Bright (2017). He wrote and directed the film Me Him Her (2015), produced the first two seasons of the Syfy series Channel Zero (2016), and created the series Dirk Gently's Holistic Detective Agency (2016) based on the novel, for BBC America. He has also written limited series published by DC and Image Comics.

In both 2011 and 2012, he was listed among Forbes magazine's "30 Under 30" young people to watch in the entertainment industry.

== Early life ==
Landis was born on August 3, 1985, his father's 35th birthday, in Beverly Hills, California, the son of director John Landis and costume designer and historian Deborah Nadoolman Landis. His family is Jewish. He left Beverly Hills High School for a therapeutic boarding school in Connecticut, but still graduated with a Beverly Hills High School diploma. A graduate of University of Miami’s Motion Picture Program. Landis has stated that he has cyclothymia and dysgraphia.

== Career ==
Max Landis appeared briefly in some of his father's films, including The Stupids, Blues Brothers 2000, and Burke and Hare. He started writing at 16, and sold his first script at the age of 18, a collaboration with his father on the Masters of Horror episode "Deer Woman". In 2008 he independently wrote an unaired episode for the series's second incarnation as Fear Itself. The same year, he wrote Back to Mysterious Island (based on the Jules Verne novel) for Bluewater Comics.

While attending the University of Miami, Landis wrote shorts which were produced by students in the school's film program. Upon leaving the university, he went on what one contemporary reporter called a "spec-selling streak", having three of his pitches optioned within six months. One of these was Good Time Gang, described as "a cross between The Bourne Identity and Jackass", which was not produced. He was hired in 2011 as screenwriter for Mr. Right, a violent romantic comedy released to mixed reviews in 2015.

He sold Chronicle, a script previously included on the Black List of promising unproduced screenplays, to 20th Century Fox's Davis Entertainment. Directed by Josh Trank, it was released in February 2012 to critical acclaim and commercial success. Landis wrote a draft for a sequel, but Fox was unhappy with it and the project was discontinued. Davis and Fox also bought Landis's script for a film based on Mary Shelley's Frankenstein, which became Victor Frankenstein, released in 2015 to generally unfavorable reviews.

Landis has written and directed two short comedic features released on YouTube. The Death and Return of Superman (2012) mockingly retells DC Comics' 1992–1993 story-line of Superman's death and revival, with scenes acted out by his friends and Hollywood actors. Wrestling Isn't Wrestling (2015) explains the nature of professional wrestling using the career of wrestler Triple H as an example, with several actors and wrestlers in cameos. Landis was later hired as a consultant for WWE Raw.

In September 2012, Landis sold a "superhero police drama" TV series titled Vigilant to Fox, and planned to executive produce it with Homeland producer Howard Gordon, but the project was cancelled. In 2012 Landis began work on his directorial debut, Me Him Her, which received a limited released in March 2016 to mixed reviews. The 2015 film American Ultra, based on his screenplay, received mixed reviews and disappointing box office results.

In February 2015, Landis directed Ariana Grande's music video "One Last Time". He was accused of plagiarizing the style and themes of the video from the music video for "You Are the One" by Australian band SAFIA.

In 2016, Netflix began production on Landis's script for Bright, then its most expensive self-produced film. Featuring magical fantasy characters such as orcs as an allegory for racism, the film was critically panned upon its release in December 2017, but Netflix reported that it was popular with its subscribers.

In September 2017, Landis published a website called "A Scar No One Else Can See", which contained a 150-page theory on the themes of Carly Rae Jepsen's songs, arguing that they present a dark, three-part narrative about heartbreak and rejection. Although Landis called the project a "celebration" of Jepsen, The Daily Dot and Pride.com described the document as a conspiracy theory, and Reid McCarter of The A.V. Club dismissed its conclusions as unremarkable.

Landis wrote a draft of the screenplay for Shadow in the Cloud (2020) before being removed from the project due to sexual assault allegations. Although the script was re-written by Roseanne Liang, he received credit per Writers Guild of America rules. Landis has said he is very happy with the finished product.

In February 2020, Landis announced Glass Planet Consulting, a "creative coaching and consulting resource for screenwriters living and working in Los Angeles".

In 2026, he was tapped to write a treatment for a G.I. Joe film, competing against a separate treatment by Danny McBride. Paramount ultimately chose not to move forward with his version.

== Misogyny and sexual assault allegations ==
Landis has been criticized for statements he has made about women, and he has been accused of abuse and sexual misconduct by several women and industry figures.

=== Misogyny accusations ===
In a 2013 interview with self-styled sexologist Shelby Sells, Landis made numerous comments about women, such as, "The most fucked up thing was that I cheated on a girl who I also gave a crippling social anxiety, self-loathing, body dysmorphia, eating disorder to." Landis's statements were sharply criticized as misogynistic and objectifying of women, such as in a Jezebel piece that described his comments as "obnoxious", "twisted", and "gross".

=== Sexual assault allegations ===
In December 2017, actress Anna Akana, a former collaborator, publicly accused Landis of sexually abusing and assaulting women. Various entertainment-industry figures also made accusatory comments toward Landis without naming him. Following Akana's statement, other industry figures confirmed Landis' reputation by name. Anti-harassment activist Zoë Quinn posted about him, alleging that his abuse of women was an "open secret" in Hollywood, and that Quinn had been withholding the story because "him & his dad are powerful figures".

The Daily Beast published accusations from eight women about emotional and sexual abuse by him, one describing him as "a serial rapist, gaslighter, physical and psychological abuser". Landis' management company Writ Large and his manager Britton Rizzio stated that they had dropped him "as soon as they heard about" the Daily Beast story. After the news broke, MGM shelved production of Deeper, a film script by Landis the studio had previously won in a bidding war.

In August 2021, Landis published an essay titled "Why I Never Responded To My Public Shaming," in which he referred to the way he was shamed in public as a result of the accusations as a somewhat corrupt enterprise, arguing that the culture that was attempting to shame him “wasn’t about accountability at all. It was about spite". While denying some of the claims in the media about him, he acknowledged, “I was a messy and damaged, selfish person who caused chaos and harm,” while also conceding "some of what's been said about me is true." He also discussed the therapy he sought following the accusations, and the public reaction to the fatal helicopter accident that occurred in 1982 on the set of his father's film Twilight Zone: The Movie.

== Filmography ==
=== Film ===
Year	Title	Credited as			
Year	Title	Director	Writer	Executive Producer	Notes
2012	Chronicle	No	Yes	No	Story co-written with Josh Trank
2015	Me Him Her	Yes	Yes	No	
2015	American Ultra	No	Yes	No	
2015	Mr. Right	No	Yes	Yes	
2015	Victor Frankenstein	No	Yes	No	Based on Frankenstein by Mary Shelley
2017	Bright	No	Yes	Yes	
2020	Shadow in the Cloud	No	Yes	No	Rewritten by Roseanne Liang; credit retained

=== Television ===
Year	Title	Credited as		Notes	Ref.
Year	Title	Writer	Executive producer	Notes	Ref.
2005	Masters of Horror	Yes	No	1 episode: "Deer Woman"	
2009	Fear Itself	Yes	No	1 episode: "Something with Bite"	
2016–2017	Channel Zero	No	Yes		
2016–2017	Dirk Gently's Holistic Detective Agency	Yes	Yes	Series creator; based on the novels by Douglas Adams.	

=== Short film ===
Year	Title	Credited as			Notes	Ref.
Year	Title	Director	Writer	Producer	Notes	
2011	The Death and Return of Superman	Yes	Yes	No	Role: Himself	
2014	The Slap	Yes	Yes	Yes	Role: Himself	
2015	Wrestling Isn't Wrestling	Yes	Yes	Yes	Role: Himself	
2021	The Death of Batman	Yes	Yes	Yes	Role: Himself, assorted characters	
2023	The Society: Endangered Species	Yes	Yes	Yes	Role: Himself, assorted characters	
2025	Superman: The Starlight Emperor	Yes	Yes	Yes	Role: Himself, assorted characters	

=== Web series ===
Year	Title	Role
2007	Trailers from Hell	Himself as commentator
2015–2017	Movie Fights	Himself as competitor (6 episodes)
2015	Best of the Worst	Himself
2016	Honest Trailers	Writer: "Batman v Superman: Dawn of Justice"
2017	Lasagna Cat	Himself (voice), Episode: "Sex Survey Results"

=== Music videos ===
Year	Title	Artist	Role
2015	"One Last Time"	Ariana Grande	Director

=== Acting credits ===
Year	Title	Role
1996	The Stupids	Graffiti artist
1998	Blues Brothers 2000	Ghostrider
2010	Burke & Hare	Handsome coachman
2015	Me Him Her	Party bystander

== Publications ==
Year	Title	Role	Publisher	Awards
2008	Back to Mysterious Island	Writer	TidalWave Productions	
2014	SCP-2137 – The Forensic Ghost of Tupac Shakur	Writer	SCP Foundation	
2016	Superman: American Alien	Writer	DC Comics	Will Eisner Award Nomination – Best Writer
2016	Green Valley	Writer	Image Comics	
2020	Polybius (stage play manuscript)	Writer	Self-published	
