= Daredevil: Born Again season 2 =

Daredevil: Born Again
- Season 2
- Promotional poster
- Showrunner: Dario Scardapane
- Starring: Charlie Cox; Vincent D'Onofrio; Deborah Ann Woll; Margarita Levieva; Matthew Lillard; Tony Dalton; Michael Gandolfini; Nikki M. James; Arty Froushan; Genneya Walton; Zabryna Guevara; Clark Johnson; Ayelet Zurer; Wilson Bethel; Lili Taylor; Elden Henson; Toby Leonard Moore; Krysten Ritter
- No. of episodes: 8

Release
- Original network: Disney+
- Original release: March 24 – May 5, 2026

Season chronology
- ← Previous; Season 1 Next → Season 3

The second season of the American television series Daredevil: Born Again is based on Marvel Comics featuring the character Daredevil. It sees blind vigilante Matt Murdock / Daredevil gathering allies to resist Wilson Fisk, who is the mayor of New York City, and his Anti-Vigilante Task Force (AVTF). Set in the Marvel Cinematic Universe (MCU) and sharing continuity with the films and television series of the franchise, Born Again is a revival and continuation of Marvel Television and Netflix's Daredevil (2015–2018). The season was produced by Marvel Studios under its own Marvel Television label, with Dario Scardapane as showrunner and Justin Benson and Aaron Moorhead as lead directors.

Charlie Cox reprises his role as Matt Murdock / Daredevil from Marvel's Netflix television series and prior Marvel Studios productions, starring alongside Vincent D'Onofrio (Fisk), Deborah Ann Woll, Margarita Levieva, Tony Dalton, Michael Gandolfini, Nikki M. James, Arty Froushan, Genneya Walton, Zabryna Guevara, Clark Johnson, Ayelet Zurer, Wilson Bethel, and Elden Henson, all returning from the first season. They are joined by Matthew Lillard, Lili Taylor, Toby Leonard Moore, and Krysten Ritter. Development on a new Daredevil series began by March 2022, and Born Again was announced in July 2022 with a planned 18-episode first season. Marvel Studios decided to overhaul the series by late September 2023, after filming began. Scardapane, Benson, and Moorhead were hired to rework the series, and the planned 18 episodes were split into two seasons. Filming for the second season took place from February to July 2025 in New York, with Solvan "Slick" Naim, Angela Barnes, and Iain B. MacDonald also directing episodes.

The second season premiered on the streaming service Disney+ on March 24, 2026, and ran for eight episodes until May 5 as part of Phase Six of the MCU. Viewership was reported to be around half as much as the first season, but reviews from critics were positive and praised the season as an improvement over the first and one of the best projects from Marvel Television, highlighting the action and performances, including those of Cox and D'Onofrio. A third and final season was confirmed in September 2025.

== Episodes ==
No. overall	No. in season	Title	Directed by	Written by	Original release date
10	1	"The Northern Star"	Aaron Moorhead & Justin Benson	Dario Scardapane	March 24, 2026
Matt Murdock, as the vigilante Daredevil, infiltrates the Northern Star, a cargo ship carrying military-grade weapons to New York mayor Wilson Fisk's Red Hook free port. The captain and first mate try to sink the ship, blocking access to the port. CIA operative "Mr. Charles" ensures upcoming trials for vigilantes captured by Fisk's Anti-Vigilante Task Force (AVTF) will not be interfered with by New York State leadership. Fisk and his wife, Vanessa, agree to work with Mr. Charles on more shipments. Murdock, who has rekindled a romantic relationship with Karen Page, searches for the Northern Star crew with his ally Cherry. Page meets with BB Urich, who spreads Fisk's propaganda while gathering information on him. Therapist Heather Glenn, suffering trauma from her capture by masked serial killer Muse, agrees to falsify Jack Duquesne's evaluation ahead of his trial for being the vigilante Swordsman. AVTF officers attack Cherry and Murdock comes to his rescue. As Cherry has a heart attack, Murdock is unmasked by the AVTF officers who are swiftly killed by Benjamin "Dex" Poindexter.
11	2	"Shoot the Moon"	Justin Benson & Aaron Moorhead	Dario Scardapane	March 31, 2026
Dex kills two AVTF officers at the hospital where Cherry is recovering, allowing Cherry's police friends to take him into hiding. Detective Angie Kim goes to Murdock and Page's hideout at Josie's Bar to let them know that Cherry is safe. Fisk asks the people of New York to search for Murdock, the hero lawyer who saved Fisk's life, making it difficult for Murdock to go out in public. Angela del Toro and her aunt Soledad Ayala witness a bodega robbery gone wrong, where AVTF officers target the teenage robber and the bodega owner who brandished a gun. Soledad intervenes and is arrested along with the bodega owner. Angela visits Murdock's law partner, Kirsten McDuffie, and retrieves her uncle Hector Ayala's Amulet of Power. BB secretly runs an online smear campaign against Fisk, dressed as a caricature of him called "Mayor Kingpin" and using footage that only Fisk's staff could access. Her friend and Fisk's Deputy Mayor of Communications, Daniel Blake, warns BB about leaking information and angering Fisk. The AVTF attacks Josie's Bar; Page takes one of the officers hostage while Daredevil defeats the rest.
12	3	"The Scales & the Sword"	Solvan "Slick" Naim	Heather Bellson	March 31, 2026
The hostage, Alan Saunders, tells Daredevil and Page that he wishes to help and gives them his Red Hook security card. Page leaks information about Red Hook being a free port to Marge McCaffrey, the governor of New York, who warns Fisk that she has the power to revoke the free port status and is considering doing so after the Northern Star incident. McDuffie is representing Duquesne and is blindfolded when taken to meet with him at Red Hook. During the trial, she argues that Fisk has no evidence of Duquesne being the Swordsman but the judges' hands are tied by Fisk's "Safer Streets Initiative" and they find Duquesne guilty. Daredevil visits McDuffie to gain information on her trip to Red Hook, and uses the sounds she heard to find his way inside. Daredevil frees Fisk's prisoners and fights off AVTF guards with Duquesne. Angela comes to save her aunt and helps Page steal a transport vehicle. Duquesne drives the other prisoners and Angela to safety while Daredevil and Page escape on their own. Fisk has the AVTF blow up the Northern Star while a crew of salvagers are on it.
13	4	"Gloves Off"	Solvan "Slick" Naim	Chantelle M. Wells	April 7, 2026
Dex lures AVTF officers to a diner and kills them. Mr. Charles confronts Fisk about delays in weapons being moved from Red Hook, but Fisk threatens him and asks for patience due to Daredevil's interference. Vanessa visits McCaffrey, who agrees to support Fisk as long as Vanessa is by his side. Murdock investigates the diner and finds Dex's apartment by Clinton Church. Dex plans to kill Fisk to make up for killing Murdock's friend Franklin "Foggy" Nelson; Murdock tells him not to martyr Fisk, but Dex ignores him and escapes. Page convinces McDuffie to record the testimony of Christofi Savva, the Northern Star's first mate, and Angela leaks recordings from Fisk's other prisoners to BB. Fisk wins a public boxing match at Fogwell's Gym while his fixer, Buck Cashman, kills Savva. Vanessa attends the boxing match against Fisk's wishes. Dex arrives and kills several AVTF officers. Vanessa shoots Dex as he throws a glass ornament which Fisk shatters with his winner's belt. Daredevil stops Fisk from killing Dex and the two escape. A shard of the ornament hits Vanessa in the head, causing her to bleed and collapse.
14	5	"The Grand Design"	Angela Barnes	Jesse Wigutow	April 14, 2026
Vanessa is rushed to a hospital in critical condition. This is reported by journalists and Blake believes BB leaked the details. Daredevil tries to help Dex, who wishes to be left to die. They are cornered by the AVTF at Clinton Church and Daredevil decides to save himself. He remembers an early law case with Nelson where they successfully defended the latter's childhood neighbor, Lionel "Ray" McCoy, and Nelson gave McCoy their savings to make a fresh start; McCoy narrowly avoided being killed by Cashman, who was hired by Fisk's then-fixer James Wesley. This memory pushes Daredevil to return for Dex and get him to safety. Blake believes he is going to be killed due to BB's leaks when Cashman makes him drive to Albany, but they are actually going to bury Savva's body. Vanessa wakes up from surgery and shows signs of confusion, asking for pineapple juice, which she is mildly allergic to, and repeatedly asking Fisk to tell the story of how they met: Wesley arranged for Fisk to use Vanessa's art gallery as a front around the time of the McCoy case. Vanessa's condition quickly deteriorates and she dies.
15	6	"Requiem"	Angela Barnes	Devon Kliger & Jesse Wigutow	April 21, 2026
Fisk mourns Vanessa, kills her surgeon, and lets the AVTF move Mr. Charles's weapons to their own warehouse. An angry Mr. Charles offers to help McCaffrey with removing Fisk from office. He also sends men to attack Jessica Jones, a super-powered investigator who turned down an offer to work for him. Jones overpowers them and goes to the AVTF warehouse with Daredevil to destroy the weapons. Cashman tells Blake to feed BB false information and encourages Glenn to imitate Muse's actions. Page nearly kills Dex but is stopped by Murdock, who disagrees with Page that Fisk and Dex should be killed. BB decides not to leak the information and almost kisses Blake, but he confronts her about the previous leaks. Page joins a protest outside City Hall and projects testimonies from the Red Hook prisoners onto the building. Murdock visits Fisk and suggests they both leave New York to have peace, but Fisk refuses and they fight. Murdock wins and leaves Fisk alive. During the protest, lead AVTF officer Connor Powell kills Saunders and blames vigilantes, causing chaos which leads to Page being caught.
16	7	"The Hateful Darkness"	Iain B. MacDonald	Heather Bellson	April 28, 2026
Jones confronts Mr. Charles about the attack on her house and learns that Luke Cage, the super-powered father of her daughter Danielle, is working for the CIA overseas. Mr. Charles tells Jones that Fisk intends to kill McCaffrey, and Jones warns Murdock. In police detention, Page is visited separately by Fisk and Murdock, the latter with the help of Chief of Detectives Brett Mahoney. Murdock comes out of hiding to serve as Page's legal counsel alongside McDuffie. After the first part of her televised trial, AVTF officers attack Murdock and McDuffie as they attempt to leave the court under the protection of Cherry, Kim, and other police allies. Murdock is shot and receives help from Jones. Glenn later visits Page to evaluate her in a tense conversation that ends with Glenn attacking Page. Dex, who was released by Murdock to do the good deed that he seeks, thwarts an assassination attempt on McCaffrey. Blake holds BB captive and nearly hands her to Cashman, but has a change of heart and allows her to escape. Cashman tortures Blake, who refuses to give up BB's location, and then reluctantly kills him.
17	8	"The Southern Cross"	Iain B. MacDonald	Dario Scardapane & Jesse Wigutow	May 5, 2026
As Page's trial continues, Murdock calls Fisk as a witness, presents Savva's video testimony, and reveals his identity as Daredevil to corroborate Savva's testimony, convincing the judges to dismiss the case. Dex stops AVTF officers from assassinating Murdock and then shoots at Fisk, hitting Cashman and prompting Fisk to lock down the courthouse. Daredevil's supporters surround the building, encouraged by BB to rise up, and AVTF officer Cole North lets them in after growing disillusioned with Powell's orders. McCaffrey and her attorney general offer Fisk a deal to avoid charges if he goes into exile, but this enrages him and he kills numerous protestors. Murdock, Jones, and Angela fight AVTF officers until they reach Fisk, and Murdock convinces Fisk to take the deal. In the aftermath, Fisk leaves New York, the AVTF is disbanded and arrested, Glenn puts on Muse's mask, Jones reunites with Cage, Dex replaces Cage in Mr. Charles's service, and BB is hired by the New York Bulletin. Murdock and Page try to move on with their lives together, but Murdock is arrested and imprisoned for his actions as Daredevil.

== Cast and characters ==
=== Main ===
- Charlie Cox as Matt Murdock / Daredevil:
  A blind lawyer with superhuman senses from Hell's Kitchen, New York, who leads a double life as a masked vigilante. Murdock forms a resistance group during the season to fight back against Wilson Fisk and his anti-vigilante agenda. Executive producer Brad Winderbaum described Murdock as a revolutionary and a rebel in the season, with the character "go[ing] up against the power of the city".
- Vincent D'Onofrio as Wilson Fisk / Kingpin:
  A powerful businessman and crime lord who is the mayor of New York City. Winderbaum said Fisk acts like a king when he takes over as mayor, and that "puts him in a new class of power players on the international stage". Executive producer Sana Amanat said Fisk's anti-vigilante "Safer Streets Initiative" is everything he hoped to achieve and the season explores whether that is enough for him. D'Onofrio said the season showed Fisk at his most human, and thought it was scary to show that the character is "just like you or I, but he's very, very dangerous." D'Onofrio continued wearing a fat suit to portray the character, as he had done since appearing in the Marvel Studios series Hawkeye (2021). However, for the boxing match, he wanted to be able to show some of his arms and shoulders, believing it would be weird to have Fisk fighting in long sleeves. D'Onofrio then began working out his upper body to grow it a few more inches to match the girth of the fat suit at his waist.
- Deborah Ann Woll as Karen Page:
  A former reporter, Murdock's friend and former partner at the law firm Nelson, Murdock & Page. Cox said Karen would be part of Murdock's resistance group during the season, and the pair would be working at night to "find a crack in the armor" while spending their days together waiting, with a rekindled romance between the two. Showrunner Dario Scardapane said Page's evolution is in line with her history in Marvel's Netflix television series Daredevil (2015–2018). He and Woll did not want her to be depicted as a sidekick or girlfriend, with Scardapane describing Page as "somebody who both mirrors and pushes Murdock—not always in the best way".
- Margarita Levieva as Heather Glenn:
  A therapist and Murdock's ex-girlfriend who is Fisk's Mental Health Commissioner. Levieva said that the season sees Glenn "struggling with the aftereffects" of Muse's attack on her in the first season, stating that Glenn is "doing her best to put up a front" while focusing on her work as a therapist, which has become her "biggest and only relationship" following her breakup with Murdock. She ultimately embraces the idea of Muse, putting on his mask at the end of the season.
- Matthew Lillard as Mr. Charles:
  An influential "power player" who becomes an antagonist for Fisk at the "politics and international diplomacy" level. Lillard said that Charles is "a CIA spook" who controls power behind the scenes such as helping nations "rise and fall". He works for CIA director Valentina Allegra de Fontaine. Lillard described the character as "somebody who bends the ear of very powerful people around the world" and who is unimpressed with Fisk, as Charles is not interested in New York City politics as much as he is in world politics. Lillard added that the character had "this Cheshire Cat sort of energy about him". Mr. Charles also uses the alias "Mr. Robertson".
- Tony Dalton as Jack Duquesne / Swordsman: A wealthy socialite who is secretly a sword-wielding vigilante and was imprisoned by Fisk in the first season
- Michael Gandolfini as Daniel Blake: Fisk's protégé and the Deputy Mayor of Communications
- Nikki M. James as Kirsten McDuffie: A former New York assistant district attorney and Murdock's former law partner
- Arty Froushan as Buck Cashman: Fisk's right-hand man and fixer
- Genneya Walton as BB Urich:
  A journalist for The BB Report and the niece of the late Ben Urich. BB disseminates propaganda for Fisk while working undercover to expose him and his crimes. She secretly runs a smear campaign against him through an online program called City Without Fear, which she hosts wearing a caricature mask of Fisk's face under the alias of "Mayor Kingpin". Ivan Moutinho provided the voice of "Mayor Kingpin" in those videos.
- Zabryna Guevara as Sheila Rivera: Fisk's mayoral campaign director
- Clark Johnson as Cherry: A retired New York Police Department (NYPD) officer who works as an investigator at the Murdock & McDuffie law firm
- Ayelet Zurer as Vanessa Fisk:
  Wilson's wife who is part of his criminal empire and the one who orchestrated Foggy Nelson's assassination. Zurer said Vanessa's death scene in the season was emotionally difficult, but she saw it as being consistent with the character's death in the Marvel Universe's canon, seen in both Brian Michael Bendis's Daredevil comic book run and the animated film Spider-Man: Into the Spider-Verse (2018).
- Wilson Bethel as Benjamin "Dex" Poindexter / Bullseye:
  A psychopathic assassin and former FBI agent who is a highly skilled marksman capable of using almost any object as a lethal projectile. Bethel said the season featured new sides to Dex's personality that had not been seen before, and he was excited for fans to see the "fun, insane stuff" that he got to do with the character in the season. Bethel added that Dex has a "renewed sense of purpose" in what he perceives as a "redemption arc" for himself, despite having a misguided idea of what redemption is.
- Lili Taylor as Marge McCaffrey: The governor of New York who is a political opponent to Fisk
- Elden Henson as Franklin "Foggy" Nelson:
  Murdock's best friend and former law partner who was assassinated by Dex, at the behest of Vanessa, in the first season. The announcement that Henson would return for the second season led to speculation that the series could adapt Daredevil vol. 2 #88 (legacy #468; August 2006). That issue, by Ed Brubaker, David Aja, and Frank D'Armata, is called "The Secret Life of Foggy Nelson" and depicts Nelson making a deal with the FBI to enter the Witness Protection Program after his apparent murder. Responding to this, director Aaron Moorhead said "dying very often does mean that you're actually dead" in Born Again's street-level stories. The character ultimately appears in flashbacks set before the events of Daredevil. Scardapane said they never intended to follow the "Secret Life" storyline from the comics because it would lessen the impact that Nelson's death has on Murdock and Page. Despite this, the creative team still wanted to include him in the season, with Amanat explaining that they could not see a Daredevil season without Henson having some involvement.
- Toby Leonard Moore as James Wesley: Fisk's former right-hand man and friend who was killed by Page in Daredevil. He appears in flashbacks set before the events of that series.
- Krysten Ritter as Jessica Jones:
  An investigator and former vigilante who becomes Murdock's resistance ally. Since she was pregnant with her daughter, Danielle, Jones's powers—which include superhuman strength and limited flying—stop working intermittently. Ritter said it felt like no time had passed since she starred as Jones in Marvel's Netflix television series Jessica Jones (2015–2019), and she found it creatively fulfilling to contrast her performance in Born Again with her concurrent role as Mia LaPierre / Lady Vengeance in the series Dexter: Resurrection (2025–present). She said exploring Jones's life as a mother was an exciting character development, and the new wrinkle with her powers made for an interesting journey. Ritter acknowledged that Jones is more willing to use her powers now, after becoming a mother, compared to her reluctance in the Netflix series, explaining, "I think when you give her a child, there's a fierceness, a mama bear that comes out and gives her real strength and power... To be bigger and badder than ever as a result of having a child is really exciting." Cox described Jones as an antihero and said she and Murdock have a mutual respect despite their differing opinions of each other. Amanat said Jones brings an "edginess and lightness" to the season that "cuts through the [bullshit] in a really fun way".

=== Recurring ===
- Hamish Allan-Headley as Connor Powell: A corrupt NYPD officer and the leader of Fisk's Anti-Vigilante Task Force (AVTF)
- John Benjamin Hickey as Benjamin Hochberg: The New York City district attorney
- Yorgos Karamihos as Christofi Savva: The first mate of the Northern Star
- Annie Parisse as Ariana Iacovou: A restaurant owner helping victims of the AVTF
- Lenny Platt as Juan Gomez: The Lieutenant Governor of New York
- Bartley Booz as a seminarian at Clinton Church
- Jeremy Isaiah Earl as Cole North: An NYPD sergeant from Chicago and a member of the AVTF who has recovered from the explosion that destroyed Murdock's apartment in the first season
- Ruibo Qian as Angie Kim: An NYPD detective helping the resistance
- Camila Rodriguez as Angela del Toro / White Tiger:
  A teenage girl who joins Murdock's resistance and takes on the mantle of White Tiger from her vigilante uncle Hector Ayala, who was assassinated by Cole North in the first season. She uses the mystical Amulet of Power that belonged to her uncle, which grants her superhuman abilities.
- Ashley Marie Ortiz as Soledad Ayala: Angela's aunt and wife of the deceased Hector
- Felix Torrez-Ponce as Alan Saunders: A member of the AVTF who wants to help the resistance
- Roberto Lopez as Berto: The owner of a bodega who was taken prisoner by the AVTF
- Deirdre Lovejoy as Waters: The chief judge presiding over the trials of Duquesne and Page
- Dustin Tucker as Grimes: A judge presiding over the trials of Duquesne and Page
- John Hedges as Luna: A judge presiding over the trials of Duquesne and Page
- Alexis Frias as Javi Espinosa: A friend of Angela's

=== Guest ===
- Ty Jones as Alan Steverud: The Attorney General of New York
- Thomas Cokenias as Achilleo Kyriaco: The captain of the Northern Star
- Susan Varon as Josie: The former owner of Josie's Bar in Hell's Kitchen
- Bobby Hernandez as Mike "Matterhorn" Melendez: A boxer who fights Fisk
- Elizabeth Ward Land as Judy Burch: An art gallery director who worked with Vanessa
- Pej Vahdat as Arash Merati: A surgeon who operates on Vanessa
- Nathan Wallace as Lionel "Ray" McCoy: Nelson's childhood neighbor and bully who later becomes a client of him and Murdock
- Amy Carlson as Gloria Blake: Daniel's mother
- Annabelle and Isabella Ivlev as Danielle: Jessica Jones and Luke Cage's daughter
- Royce Johnson as Brett Mahoney: An NYPD Chief of Detectives and longtime ally of Murdock, Page and Nelson
- Geoffrey Cantor as Mitchell Ellison: The editor-in-chief of the New York Bulletin
- Mike Colter as Luke Cage: A former convict with superhuman strength and unbreakable skin who is Danielle's father and has done work overseas for Mr. Charles

Additionally, NY1 newscaster Annika Pergament appears as herself, and the character Bastian Cooper / Muse appears as a hallucination seen by Glenn. The season features photographs of Vondie Curtis-Hall's Daredevil character Ben Urich, as well as archive footage from that series of Skylar Gaertner as a young Murdock and John Patrick Hayden as his father "Battlin" Jack Murdock.

== Production ==
=== Development ===
A reboot of Marvel's Netflix television series Daredevil (2015–2018) was reported to be in development with Marvel Studios in March 2022. The series was confirmed to be in development for Disney+ in late May, with Matt Corman and Chris Ord attached as head writers and executive producers. At San Diego Comic-Con that July, the series was announced as Daredevil: Born Again and was revealed to have 18 episodes for its first season. By late September 2023, after six episodes had been filmed, Marvel Studios decided to overhaul the series with a new creative direction. Corman and Ord were let go as head writers, as were the series' remaining directors. Marvel planned to retain some elements that had been shot, add new serialized elements, and move closer to the tone of the Netflix series. The creative team also decided to connect the new series to the original series more directly than had previously been planned. Dario Scardapane, a writer on Netflix's Daredevil spin-off series The Punisher (2017–2019), was hired as showrunner for Born Again in October 2023. Filmmaking duo Justin Benson and Aaron Moorhead, who previously worked on the Marvel Studios series Moon Knight (2022) and the second season of Loki (2023), were hired to direct the remaining episodes.

Marvel Studios president Kevin Feige said in August 2024 that nine episodes had been completed that would make up the first season of Born Again, and a second season was planned; with the creative overhaul, the planned 18-episode season had been split into two, nine-episode seasons. In February 2025, Scardapane, Benson, and Moorhead were confirmed to be returning for the second season, with Benson and Moorhead directing the first two episodes. Scardapane said the second season would just be eight episodes, and described its production as a "better-oiled machine". In May, star Vincent D'Onofrio revealed that Angela Barnes would direct for the season after doing so for the Marvel Studios series Ironheart (2025). Solvan "Slick" Naim and Iain B. MacDonald were revealed in July to also be directing. Naim directed the third and fourth episodes, Barnes directed the fifth and sixth episodes, and MacDonald directed the final two episodes. Executive producers included Marvel Studios' Feige, Louis D'Esposito, Brad Winderbaum, and Sana Amanat, alongside Scardapane, Benson, Moorhead, MacDonald, Cox, and D'Onofrio. David Chambers serves as producer. The series is released under Marvel Studios' "Marvel Television" label.

=== Writing ===
The series' initial take was described as a legal procedural that was dark, but not as gory as the Netflix series, and more episodic than other Marvel Studios series with "self-contained" episodes. D'Onofrio said in March 2023 that they were working on two seasons and there would be "gigantic payoffs" during the second. Following the series' creative overhaul, serialized elements were added, and the cast said the events of the original series would be part of their characters' histories. Some new storylines build on those events, but they did not want to dwell too much on the past or alienate new viewers. Scardapane said his creative goal for Born Again, particularly starting in the second season, was to cover the world of all the Marvel Netflix series, and he had discussions about including the characters Jessica Jones and Luke Cage from when he first joined the series.

Heather Bellson, Jesse Wigutow, and Devon Kliger returned as writers from the first season, alongside newcomers Chantelle Wells and Omar Najam. Wigutow said the season had a "singular vision", unlike the first which at times felt "jigsawed together" due to the creative overhaul. Scardapane said the scripts for seven episodes were "locked, loaded, [and] ready to go" ahead of filming. He was still working on the season finale, as he wanted to incorporate elements discovered during filming similar to traditional network television series where only a few episodes are written ahead of the one being filmed. The final script was completed by May 2025. Star Charlie Cox applauded the scripts, believing the season had some of the series' best writing and a strong ensemble due to it developing characters who Cox felt were "left behind" in the series' initial iteration. A character that was inherited from the initial take is the serial killer Muse, whose storyline has a "ripple effect" from the first season into the second. Scardapane felt they did not do justice in resolving this storyline in the first season, but he was able to expand on it in the second by exploring how therapist Heather Glenn is impacted by Muse's actions and eventually takes on the mantle of Muse herself going into the third season.

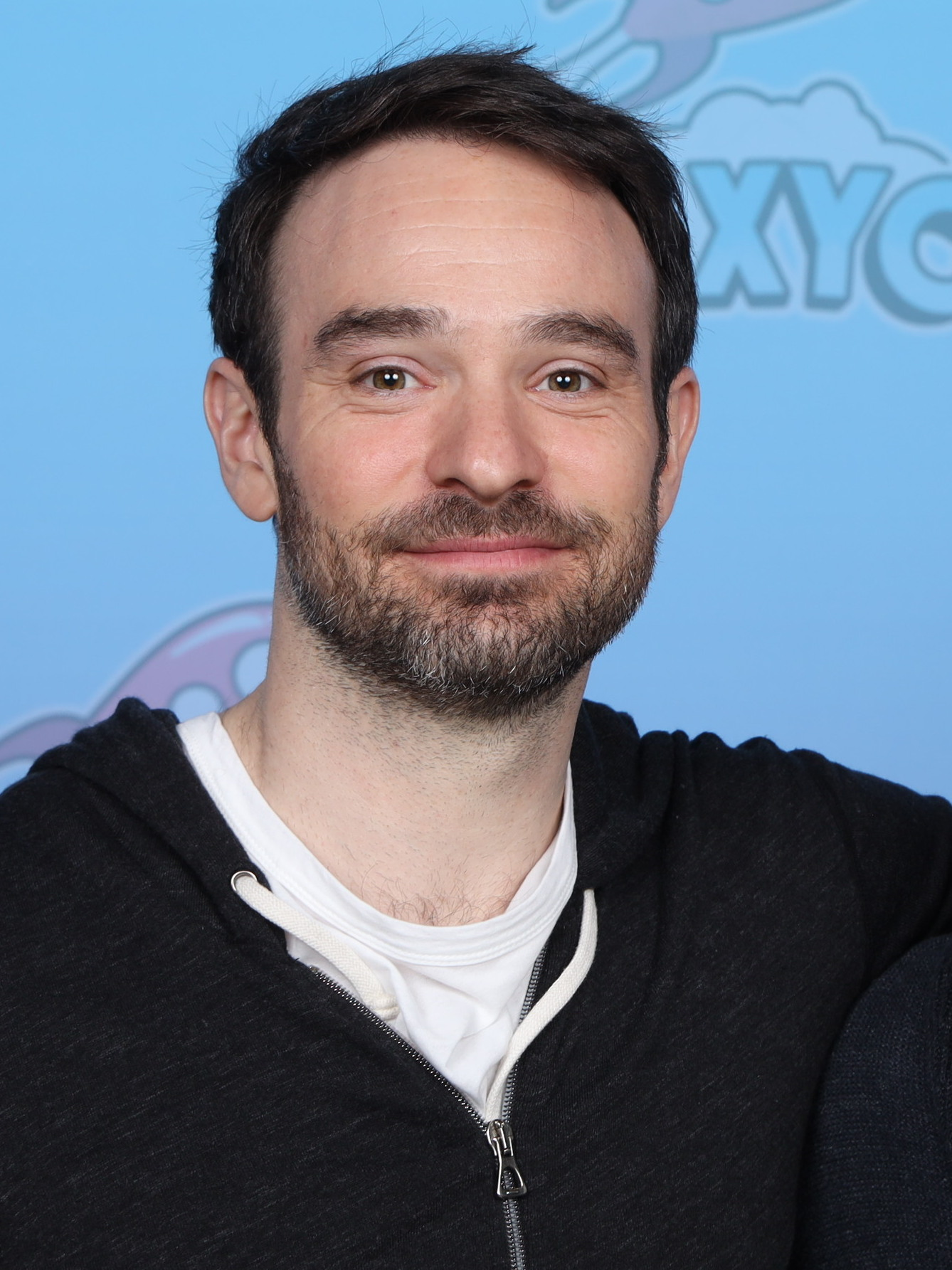
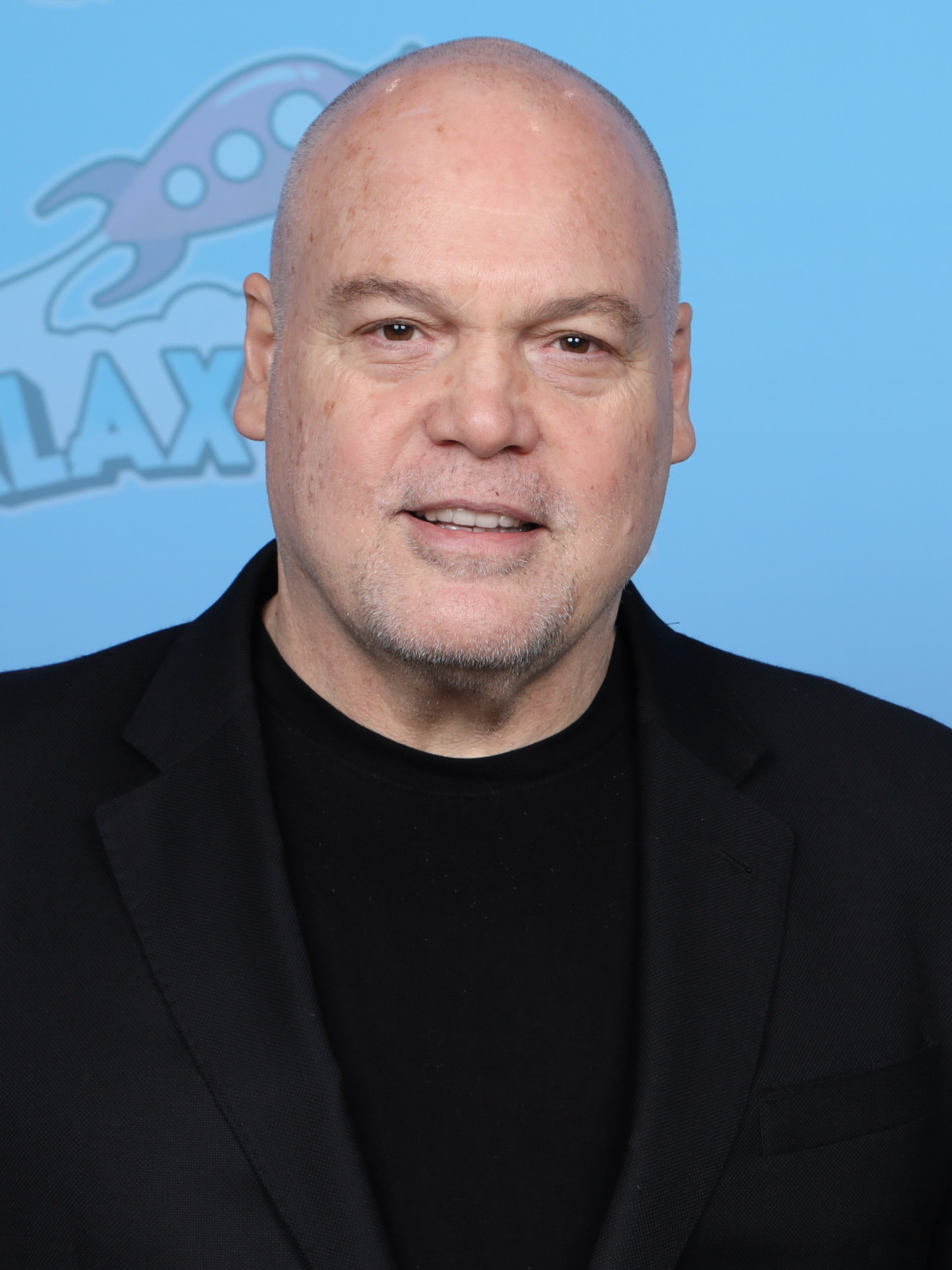
Stars Charlie Cox (left) and Vincent D'Onofrio (right) were executive producers for the season, which continues the storyline of D'Onofrio's Wilson Fisk as mayor of New York City. Cox's Matt Murdock publicly reveals that he is Daredevil at the end of the season as part of a legal case to stop Fisk.

Scardapane described the second season as a "part two", building on what had been done with the first, with visual cues, themes, and Easter eggs from the first season that "pay off monstrously" in the second. At the end of the first season, Mayor Wilson Fisk / Kingpin has placed New York City under martial law and locked his political opponents in cages. D'Onofrio said this allows Fisk to commit crimes and get rid of vigilantes, but the character has bigger plans to expand his power and reach beyond New York. Wigutow said the season was telling a "big New York City story" about crime and politics that narrows down to "what matters most" in the finale, and is ultimately about Fisk and Matt Murdock / Daredevil both hating and needing each other. Scardapane said Fisk and Murdock's fight "poisons everything around them", while Cox said Fisk's New York had become "much more sinister" for those looking to do the right thing and the first-season pact between Murdock and Fisk, to avoid confronting each other, no longer applies. Because of Fisk's actions, the characters are divided into two factions: Murdock's resistance and Fisk's administration. Scardapane said the season is a "resistance story" that explores how Murdock, who found a balance with his life as the vigilante Daredevil in the first season, can continue to operate now that being a vigilante is illegal. He said in April 2025 that Murdock's fellow Defenders from Marvel's Netflix series could join his army, but incorporating them all was "tricky writing-wise" as the writers wanted the story to unfold organically and earn the right to have returning characters; a month later, Jones was announced to be one of Murdock's allies in the season.

Scardapane acknowledged similarities between the Mayor Fisk storyline and contemporary U.S. politics, but said the writers were drawing from the comics and history. He referenced the French Revolution, while the actions and costumes of the Anti-Vigilante Task Force (AVTF) were taken from the comics. Scardapane said it was strange that the episodes they filmed a year earlier looked like they "could be off the news" at the time of the season's release, and he ultimately felt the storyline became too topical and moved the series away from "the large, mythological genre stuff" from the comics. He said the storyline would end with the second season. The writers knew early in development that Murdock would publicly reveal his identity as Daredevil at the end of the season, and worked to ensure that Murdock has to make this decision to stop Fisk. Scardapane said the moment was the "ultimate sacrifice" for the character and an "implosion" for the series, leading to Murdock being imprisoned going into the third season. Multiple commentators compared the scene to Tony Stark revealing himself as Iron Man at the end of Iron Man (2008), the first Marvel Cinematic Universe (MCU) film. The season also features the death of Fisk's wife Vanessa, which drives him into a "whole new level of crazy". Vanessa's actress Ayelet Zurer said the death was an "explosion" for Kingpin, taking away what little humanity he had left with her. The writers viewed Vanessa's death as a way to maintain balance between Fisk and Murdock, with her death being equal to Franklin "Foggy" Nelson's death in the first season. Scardapane said it was "intentional irony" that Benjamin "Dex" Poindexter / Bullseye is the one to kill both Nelson and Vanessa.

The season is set around six months after the events of the first season, and concurrent with the events of the Marvel Studios television special The Punisher: One Last Kill (2026). The creative team were in constant discussions with the filmmakers behind the film Spider-Man: Brand New Day (2026), which includes characters from the season such as Sheila Rivera, to ensure events lined up and "impacts are felt" between the two. Winderbaum said the tones of each project were different but they still wanted to highlight that they exist in the same world. Another element of "connective tissue" with the wider MCU is the character Mr. Charles, a CIA agent who works for the agency's director, Valentina Allegra de Fontaine. De Fontaine is referenced but does not appear; Scardapane wanted her to be "part of our world" but said the decision to include her was not his. Winderbaum compared Jones's role in the season to Frank Castle / Punisher's in the first season. It was important to Scardapane that they build out the different worlds of the returning Marvel Netflix characters and show that their lives have moved on in the years since those series ended. He was excited to depict Jones and Cage as having a child together as they do in the comics. The writers conceived a storyline in which Mr. Charles is recruiting superpowered people such as Cage and Dex, leading to Cage's appearance in the finale when he returns from working for the CIA overseas and reunites with Jones and their daughter Danielle, setting-up his story for future seasons.

=== Casting ===
Main cast members returning from the first season include Charlie Cox as Matt Murdock / Daredevil, Vincent D'Onofrio as Wilson Fisk / Kingpin, Deborah Ann Woll as Karen Page, Margarita Levieva as Heather Glenn, Tony Dalton as Jack Duquesne / Swordsman, Michael Gandolfini as Daniel Blake, Nikki M. James as Kirsten McDuffie, Arty Froushan as Buck Cashman, Genneya Walton as BB Urich, Zabryna Guevara as Sheila Rivera, Clark Johnson as Cherry, Ayelet Zurer as Vanessa Fisk, Wilson Bethel as Dex Poindexter / Bullseye, and Elden Henson as Foggy Nelson.

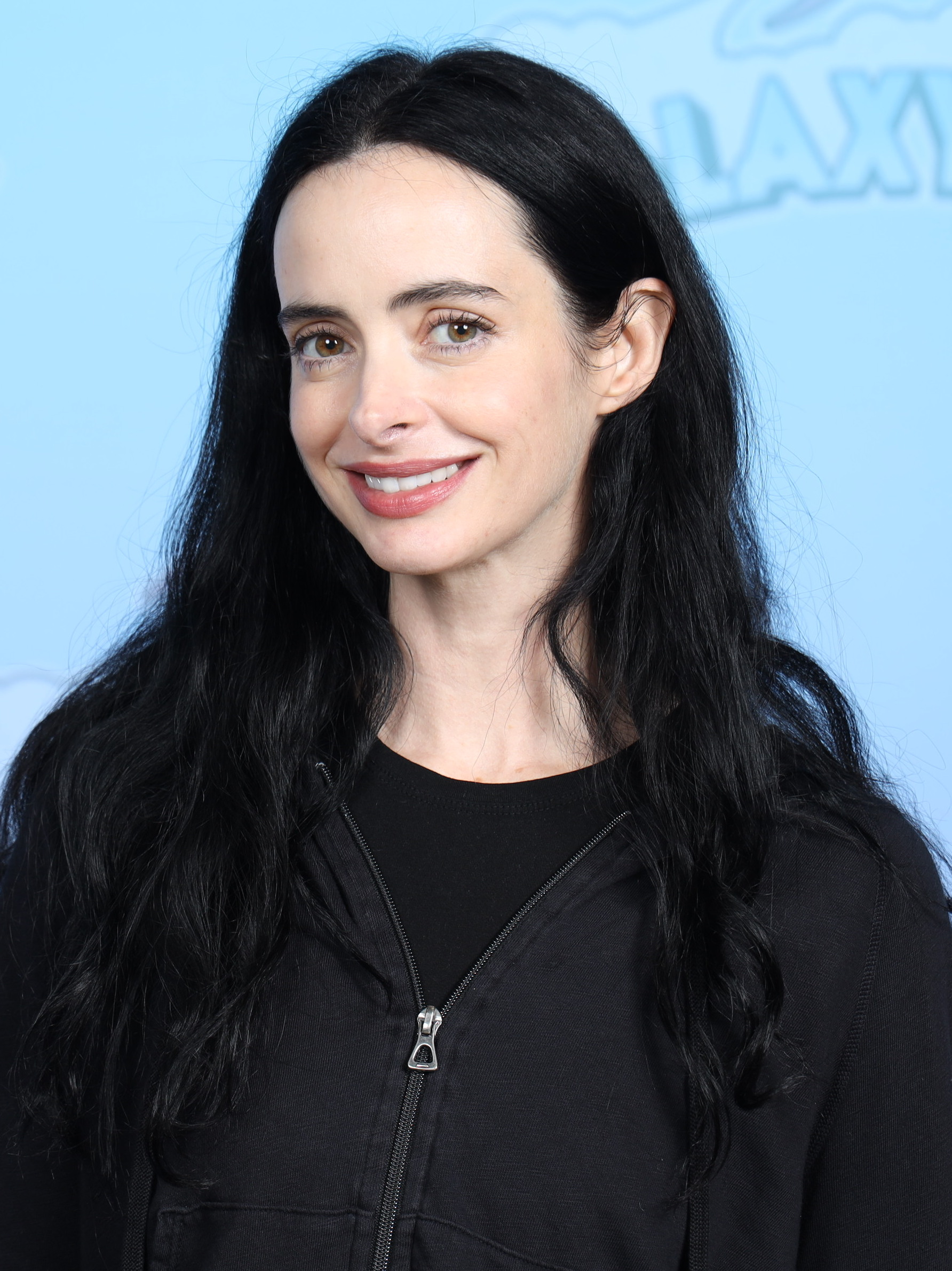
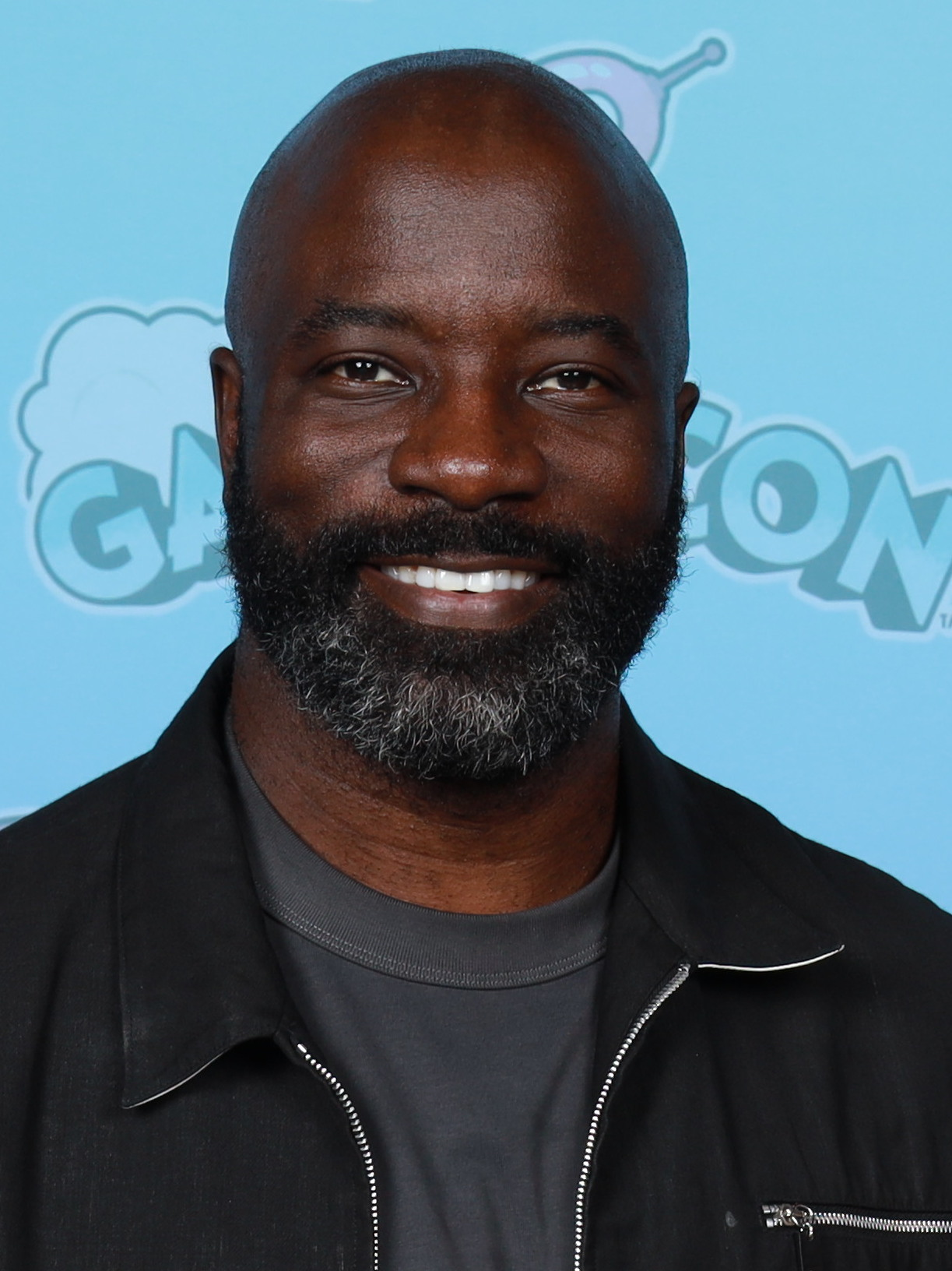
Krysten Ritter (left) and Mike Colter (right) reprised their respective roles of Jessica Jones and Luke Cage from Marvel's Netflix television series for the second season of Born Again.

At the end of February 2025, Matthew Lillard joined the cast for the season as Mr. Charles. He called it a "small role right now" and was hopeful the character could return in the future. The next month, Lili Taylor joined as Marge McCaffrey, the governor of New York and a political opponent to Fisk. Also in March, set photos revealed that Annie Parisse was part of the cast. In May, Krysten Ritter was announced to be reprising her role as Jessica Jones from Marvel's Netflix series. Ritter said she had known about her return to the role for nearly two years and had struggled to keep that secret due to being "asked about [playing the character again] daily". Royce Johnson was revealed in July to be reprising his role as Brett Mahoney from Marvel's Netflix series, and confirmed his involvement in December. Toby Leonard Moore was revealed in March 2026 to be reprising his role as James Wesley from the first season of Daredevil (2015). Geoffrey Cantor and Mike Colter also returned from Marvel's Netflix series in their respective roles of Mitchell Ellison and Luke Cage for brief appearances in the season finale. Ritter initially called Colter herself about reprising his role after discussing the potential for an appearance with Amanat. The producers contacted Colter around six weeks before the finale was filmed and were initially unsure if he would come back for a single scene due to his busy schedule. Colter publicly revealed that there had been discussions about his return as Cage in January 2026.

Other actors returning from the first season of Born Again include Susan Varon as Josie, Camila Rodriguez as Angela del Toro / White Tiger, Hamish Allan-Headley as Connor Powell, John Benjamin Hickey as Benjamin Hochberg, Jeremy Isaiah Earl as Cole North, Ruibo Qian as Angie Kim, and Ashley Marie Ortiz as Soledad Ayala. There was speculation about whether Jon Bernthal would return as Frank Castle / Punisher, but Amanat said he would not and Castle's story would instead be continued in One Last Kill. D'Onofrio said Bernthal was not in the season because of his commitments to One Last Kill and Brand New Day.

=== Design ===
Michael Shaw and Emily Gunshor returned as production designer and costume designer, respectively, from the first season. The second season features a black Daredevil suit with a red "double D" chest emblem, similar to the one featured in the "Shadowland" (2010) comic book storyline. It is the first time the character has worn a suit with the chest emblem in the MCU. The suit is Daredevil's red suit from the first season spray-painted black. Throughout the second season, the black paint gradually peels away, revealing more of the red underneath. Cox felt it was "pretty cool" to finally wear a suit with the chest emblem and said he had never asked for it before and had to "earn it". He was happy for the suit to be seen in set photos, rather than the usual secrecy that is taken with a new suit during production, because he was proud to finally have the emblem and wanted to show it off. A scene was shot showing Murdock painting the suit, which Scardapane said was "pretty surreal", but it was ultimately cut from the season because it would have revealed the "double D" emblem and the creative team felt it was more interesting to first show the emblem during an actual Daredevil sequence. Cox said the suit with the peeled away paint was his favorite to date, calling it "bad-ass" and noting it had unique elements that were created for the season and had not been seen in the comics.

Dex's Bullseye costume was also updated for the season, featuring a black and blue "target" emblem on the forehead, similar to the iconic white one from the comics. Gunshor recreated Jones's leather jacket from Marvel's Netflix television series Jessica Jones (2015–2019), based on the original jacket which Ritter had kept after that series ended. Angela wears a homemade White Tiger costume that Gunshor described as a "kind of armor", though she also said it is not a "full superhero suit"; it consists of a white tiger-print bandana covering the lower half of Angela's face, a white hood under a black vest, and black gloves and belt that she swaps for white ones over the course of the season. AVTF members wear a new all-black armored uniform this season that features the Punisher's iconic skull symbol as the task force's logo.

=== Filming ===
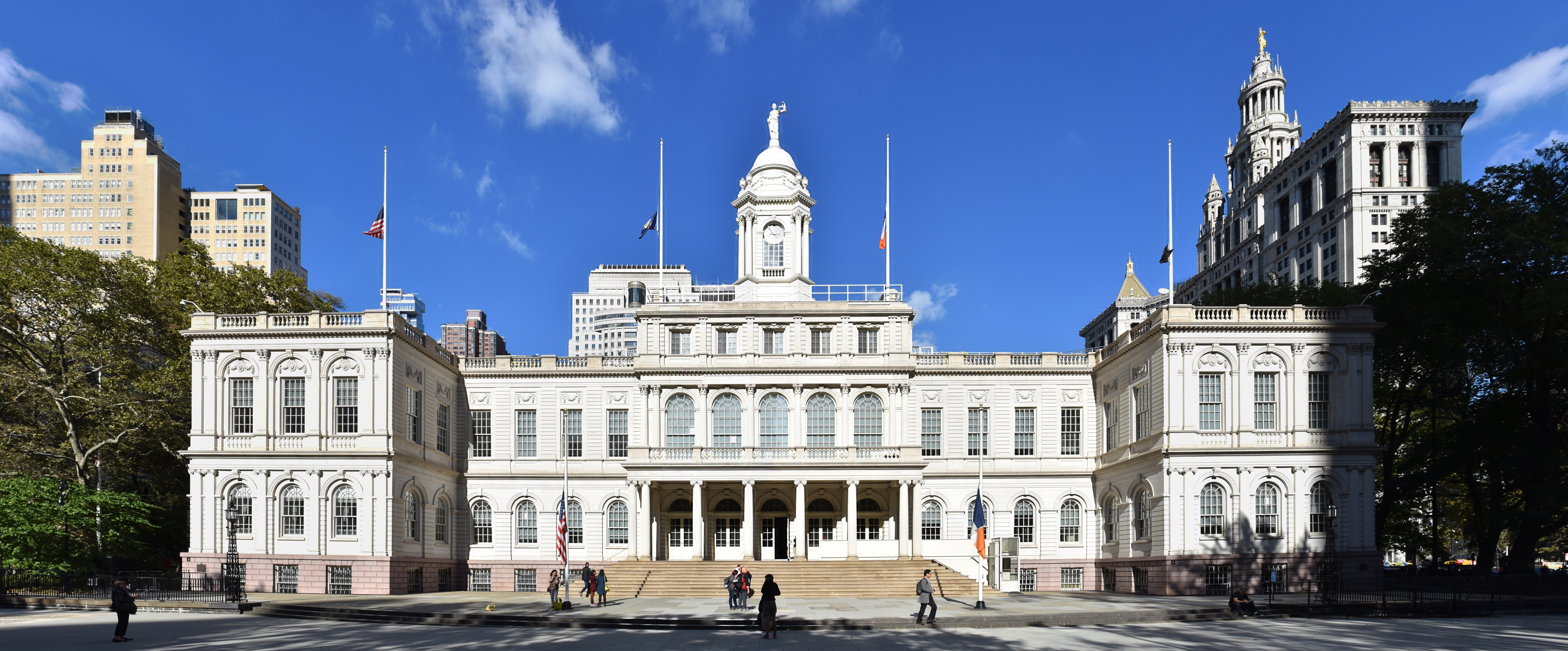
Location filming took place around New York, including at City Hall

Principal photography began on February 28, 2025, with Benson and Moorhead, Naim, Barnes, and MacDonald as directors, under the working title Out the Kitchen 2. Soundstage work occurred at Silvercup Studios East in Queens. Hillary Fyfe Spera returned as cinematographer from the first season, working on the first, second, fifth, and sixth episodes. Jeffrey Waldron was cinematographer for the other four episodes. Philip Silvera also returned from the first season as stunt coordinator and second unit director. In late March, filming occurred in Greenpoint, Brooklyn, at the set for Josie's Bar, with Cox wearing his black Daredevil suit. In early April, Bethel filmed scenes in Chelsea. Dalton was injured while filming action scenes for the season, requiring him to rest for two or three weeks. Filming of a scene at New York City Hall involved more than 300 extras and 35 stunt performers, and took place over four nights, with shooting occurring between 6 p.m. and 4 a.m. each night. Two distinct fight scenes that alternate continuously were filmed in a single day, with Silvera having had three days to prepare each: the first fight features Daredevil, Jones, and White Tiger facing off against AVFT officers, while the second shows Fisk killing several protesters. Filming was halfway done by mid-May, and wrapped on July 9.

D'Onofrio believed the fight between Fisk and Murdock in the season was very similar to the action in the original Netflix series. The season features some archival footage from Daredevil which is presented in its original 1.78:1 full screen aspect ratio rather than Born Again's wider 2.39:1 aspect ratio. 1.78:1 was also used for the new flashback scenes in the fifth episode, along with a different lighting approach that is closer to that of the original series. Commentators believed there was a possible appearance of a Watcher in the fourth episode, which was acknowledged by Winderbaum. An outline of the Watcher's head is seemingly created out of broken glass after Bullseye and Daredevil escape through the window of Fogwell's Gym, with the indoor light fixtures believed to be forming the Watcher's eyes.

=== Post-production ===
Editors for the season included Melissa Lawson Cheung (first and fourth episodes), Stephanie Filo (second, fifth, and seventh episodes), and Cedric Nairn-Smith (third, sixth, and eighth episodes), with Lyric Ramsey and Yoni Rusnak assisting on the fifth and sixth episodes, respectively; Cheung, Filo, and Nairn-Smith returned from the first season. Gong Myung Lee also returned as visual effects supervisor, with visual effects provided by Eyeline, Storm Studios, Important Looking Pirates, Lola Visual Effects, Phosphene, Curated, Anibrain, Cantina Creative, FOLKS, EDI Effetti Digitali Italiani, Ingenuity Studios, and Wylie Co. VFX.

Blake was originally meant to survive his scene with Cashman in the seventh episode, with Gandolfini filming scenes for the final episode and expecting to return for the third season. While writing the third season and editing the second, Scardapane came to feel that this was the wrong decision and said keeping him alive was "kind of meh and a non-story" that did not stay true to either character. The scene was altered through editing and visual effects to end with Cashman killing Blake, and the latter's scenes were removed from the eighth episode. Gandolfini agreed that this was the right decision and called it a "respectful goodbye" for Blake.

=== Music ===
The Newton Brothers return as composers from the first season. Their score for the season was released digitally by Hollywood Records and Marvel Music in two volumes: music from the first four episodes were released on April 7, and music for the other four episodes were released on May 5.

Daredevil: Born Again Season 2 – Vol. 1 (Episodes 1–4) [Original Soundtrack]
No.	Title	Length
1.	"The Man Without Fear"	1:14
2.	"Where I Belong"	0:52
3.	"Grace"	2:13
4.	"I Read the Tea Leaves"	2:48
5.	"Cost of Violence"	1:40
6.	"Absolution"	3:15
7.	"Blood & Blessing"	2:03
8.	"Spotlight"	1:12
9.	"Start Hunting Them"	1:29
10.	"Head of the Snake"	3:52
11.	"Red Hook"	2:16
12.	"Penance"	1:44
13.	"Resist. Rebel. Rebuild."	2:53
14.	"The Beautiful Brutal"	1:07
15.	"Night Extraction"	2:21
16.	"He Killed 'Em All"	0:52
17.	"A Saint's Sacrifice"	1:45
18.	"Assorted Weapons"	2:40
19.	"Maraschino Cherry"	1:42
20.	"Salut et Memoria"	1:13
21.	"Morning Star"	1:44
22.	"The Main Event"	2:39
Total length:		39:34

Daredevil: Born Again Season 2 – Vol. 2 (Episodes 5–8) [Original Soundtrack]
No.	Title	Length
1.	"The Right Person"	1:55
2.	"Mercy"	4:04
3.	"Ripe Avocados"	1:25
4.	"Rabbits in a Snowstorm"	1:31
5.	"Mors Omnes Vincit"	0:38
6.	"Light at the End"	0:50
7.	"Old Friends"	2:31
8.	"Sketchy As Hell"	1:30
9.	"Caged Like an Animal"	3:16
10.	"Offering Condolences"	2:35
11.	"Effaced"	3:27
12.	"Help in the Shadows"	2:51
13.	"Above the Law"	2:01
14.	"Blue Ricochets"	1:48
15.	"Forgive Me"	2:43
16.	"The Truth Shall Prevail"	0:56
17.	"Resistance"	4:50
18.	"Vespers for the Condemned"	2:34
19.	"Towering Inferno: I. Incendium"	2:54
20.	"Towering Inferno: II. Casus Regis"	2:54
21.	"City Without Fear"	1:54
Total length:		44:27

== Marketing ==
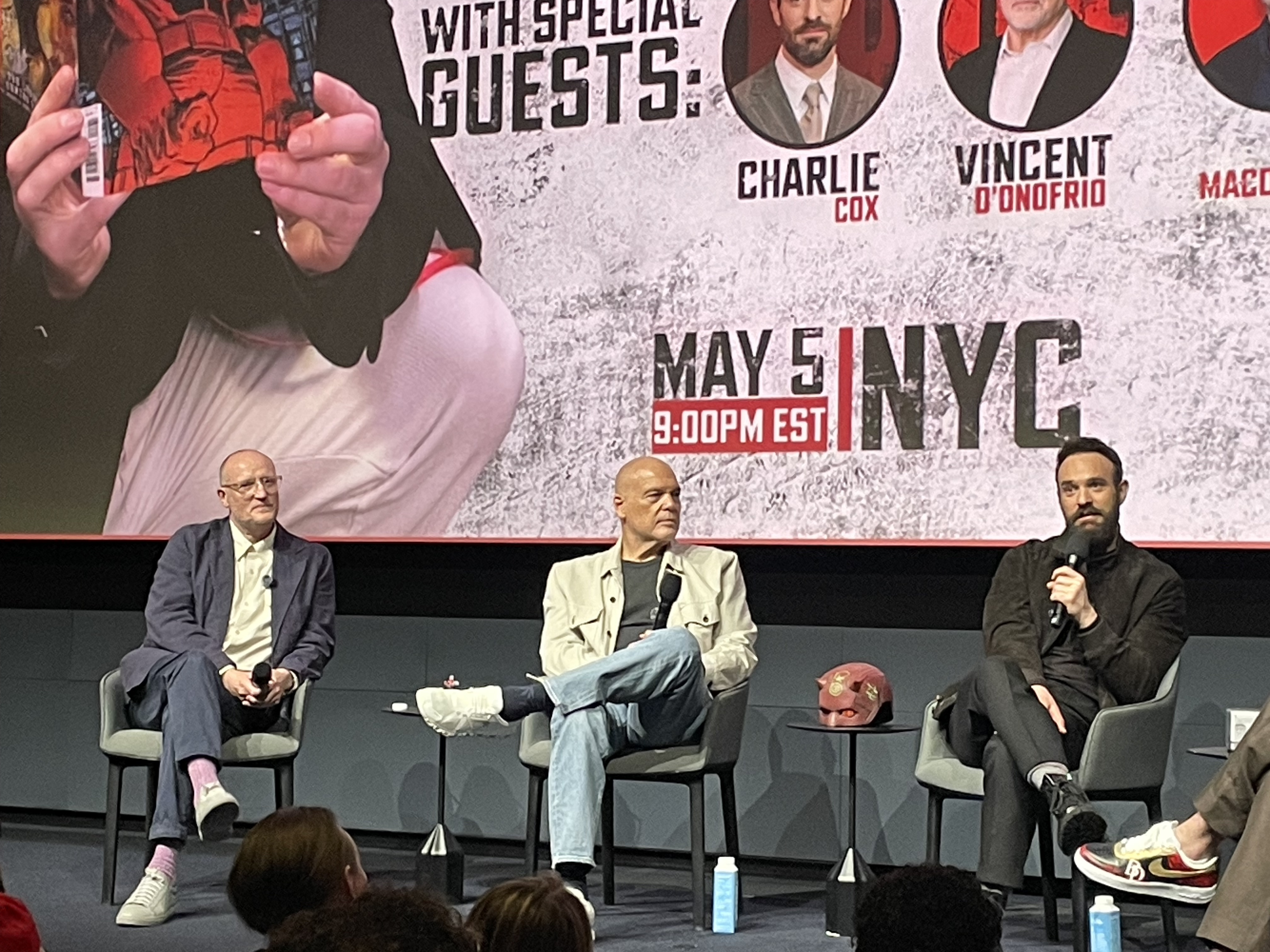
Director Iain B. MacDonald with stars Vincent D'Onofrio and Charlie Cox at a screening event for the season finale in May 2026

In May 2025, Cox and Ritter appeared at Disney's upfront presentation where they debuted footage from the season, and Cox confirmed that Daredevil would wear an "iconic" suit featuring the "double D" chest emblem. In October, Cox and Ritter appeared together again at New York Comic Con to present footage from the season. More footage was shown at CCXP in December. The first teaser trailer was released on January 27, 2026, set to Childish Gambino's "Lithonia". The teaser was noted for showing Foggy Nelson, which commentators believed would be for a flashback sequence.

== Release ==
The season premiered on March 24, 2026, and consists of eight episodes, releasing weekly until May 5. A launch event was held at Drais Supper Club in New York City on March 23, 2026. It is part of Phase Six of the MCU, and is released under Marvel Studios' "Marvel Television" label.

== Reception ==
=== Viewership ===
Streaming analytics firm FlixPatrol, which monitors daily updated VOD charts and streaming ratings across the globe, reported that Daredevil: Born Again season 2 debuted at No. 1 on Disney+'s overall streaming charts. The season ranked No. 2 in Hungary, Ireland, and the United Kingdom; No. 3 in several markets, including Australia, Canada, Spain, Italy, Sweden, and Poland; and No. 4 in the United States and other countries.

Luminate, which measures streaming performance in the United States using viewership data, audience engagement metrics, and content reach across multiple platforms, reported that the second season of Daredevil: Born Again accumulated 4.5 million views, 10.9 million hours watched, and 652 million minutes watched during its first five weeks of release. This marked an approximate 46% decline in total views and a 54% decline in total hours watched compared with the first five weeks of the first season's release. Luminate subsequently reported that the second season of Daredevil: Born Again amassed 5.8 million views and was streamed for 2.3 billion minutes during the first half of 2026.

=== Critical response ===
Daredevil: Born Again season 2: Critical reception by episode
Percentage of positive critics' reviews tracked by the website Rotten Tomatoes

On review aggregator Rotten Tomatoes, 87% of 131 critics gave the season a positive review, and the average of rated reviews was 7.85 out of 10. The critics consensus reads, "Daredevil: Born Again imbues its second season with rich substance thanks to devilishly good performances, punchier narrative momentum, and well-timed themes befitting this daring crusader." Metacritic, which uses a weighted average, assigned a score of 73 out of 100 based on 16 critics, indicating "generally favorable" reviews. Critics praised the season as an improvement over the first and one of the best projects from Marvel Television, highlighting the action and performances, including those of Cox and D'Onofrio.

Discussing the continuous shot fight from the third episode, Casey Loving at TheWrap felt it was better than the one in the first season, saying it "harkens back to the hallway fights of old, bringing more tension, stakes and clarity than we've ever seen outside of the original Netflix series". He enjoyed Daredevil fighting AVTF agents, the fight setting and composition, and the inclusion of Dalton, but took issue with the "wonkiness" of the digital effects used. He ranked the fight fourth out of the character's seven continuous shot fights to date.

=== Accolades ===
Accolades received by Daredevil: Born Again season 2
Award	Date of ceremony	Category	Recipient	Result	Ref.
Critics' Choice Super Awards	August 6, 2026	Best Superhero Series, Limited Series or Made-for-TV Movie	Daredevil: Born Again	Nominated	
Critics' Choice Super Awards	August 6, 2026	Best Actress in a Superhero Series, Limited Series or Made-for-TV Movie	Deborah Ann Woll	Nominated	
MacGuffin Awards	September 12, 2026	One-Hour Contemporary Television Series	Katie Clinebelle	Pending	

== Podcast ==
Marvel Television launched a nine-episode Daredevil: Born Again Official Podcast, which began on March 17, 2026. It features conversations with the cast, crew, and creatives, with the first episode looking back at the series so far and teasing elements of the season. Subsequent weekly episodes of the podcast will further explore each episode of the season. The Daredevil: Born Again Official Podcast is being released on Disney+ and YouTube, with an audio-only version available on various podcast platforms.

No.	YouTube title Disney+ and audio podcast title	Featuring	Original release date
1	"Season 1 Lookback" "Daredevil: Born Again Returns (Season 1 Lookback)"	Wilson Bethel, Brad Winderbaum, Dario Scardapane, and Sana Amanat	March 17, 2026
2	"Inside S2 E1 The Northern Star" "The Northern Star (Inside Episode 1)"	Vincent D'Onofrio, Charlie Cox, Justin Benson, and Aaron Moorhead	March 24, 2026
3	"Inside S2 E2 Shoot the Moon" "Shoot the Moon (Inside Episode 2)"	Deborah Ann Woll, Michael Gandolfini, and Michael Shaw	March 31, 2026
4	"Inside S2 E3 The Scales & the Sword" "The Scales & The Sword (Inside Episode 3)"	Nikki M. James, Charlie Cox, Tony Dalton, and Philip Silvera	March 31, 2026
5	"Inside S2 E4 Gloves Off" "Gloves Off (Inside Episode 4)"	Wilson Bethel, Dario Scardapane, Michael Gandolfini, and Vincent D'Onofrio	April 7, 2026
6	"Inside S2 E5 The Grand Design" "The Grand Design (Inside Episode 5)"	Ayelet Zurer, Sana Amanat, and the Newton Brothers (John Andrew Grush and Taylor Newton Stewart)	April 14, 2026
7	"Inside S2 E6 Requiem" "Requiem (Inside Episode 6)"	Wilson Bethel, Dario Scardapane, Margarita Levieva, Michael Gandolfini, and Emily Gunshor	April 21, 2026
8	"Inside S2 E7 The Hateful Darkness" "The Hateful Darkness (Inside Episode 7)"	Michael Gandolfini, Lili Taylor, Sana Amanat, and Arty Froushan	April 28, 2026
9	"Inside S2 E8 The Southern Cross" "The Southern Cross (Inside Episode 8)"	Charlie Cox, Vincent D'Onofrio, Brad Winderbaum, and Dario Scardapane	May 5, 2026
