= Daredevil: Born Again season 3 =

Daredevil: Born Again
- Season 3
- Showrunner: Dario Scardapane
- Starring: Charlie Cox; Vincent D'Onofrio; Wilson Bethel; Deborah Ann Woll; Margarita Levieva; Matthew Lillard; Arty Froushan; Zabryna Guevara; Krysten Ritter; Mike Colter; Finn Jones; Élodie Yung

Release
- Original network: Disney+

Season chronology
- ← Previous; Season 2

The third and final season of the American television series Daredevil: Born Again is based on Marvel Comics featuring the character Daredevil. It sees blind lawyer Matt Murdock in prison for his crimes as the vigilante Daredevil while former New York City mayor Wilson Fisk goes into exile. Set in the Marvel Cinematic Universe (MCU) and sharing continuity with the films and television series of the franchise, Born Again is a revival and continuation of Marvel Television and Netflix's Daredevil (2015–2018). The season is produced by Marvel Studios under its own Marvel Television label, with Dario Scardapane as showrunner.

Charlie Cox reprises his role as Matt Murdock / Daredevil from Marvel's Netflix television series and prior Marvel Studios productions, starring alongside Vincent D'Onofrio (Fisk), Wilson Bethel, Deborah Ann Woll, Margarita Levieva, Matthew Lillard, Arty Froushan, Zabryna Guevara, Krysten Ritter, and Mike Colter from past seasons. They are joined by Finn Jones and Élodie Yung reprising their roles from the Netflix series. A third season was confirmed in September 2025. Filming took place between March and July 2026, with Iain B. MacDonald, Solvan "Slick" Naim, and Jet Wilkinson also directing episodes. Scardapane's contract was not renewed by Marvel in September 2026 during the middle of post-production, when it was also revealed the season would be the series' last.

The third and final season is scheduled to premiere on the streaming service Disney+ in March 2027 and will consist of eight episodes. It will be part of Phase Six of the MCU.

== Episodes ==
No. overall	No. in season	Title	Directed by	Written by	Original release date
18	1	TBA	Iain B. MacDonald	TBD	March 2027

Solvan "Slick" Naim directed the fifth episode. Justin Benson and Aaron Moorhead, and Jet Wilkinson also directed episodes.

== Cast and characters ==
=== Main ===
- Charlie Cox as Matt Murdock / Daredevil:
  A blind former lawyer with superhuman senses from Hell's Kitchen, New York, who is in prison for his actions as the masked vigilante Daredevil after revealing his identity at the end of the second season
- Vincent D'Onofrio as Wilson Fisk / Kingpin: The former mayor of New York City, who lost his power and influence as a businessman and crime lord at the end of the second season and is now in exile
- Wilson Bethel as Benjamin "Dex" Poindexter / Bullseye:
  A psychopathic assassin and former FBI agent who is a highly skilled marksman capable of using almost any object as a lethal projectile. After the character became a CIA operative at the end of the second season, Bethel said that Dex in this season would be more of a "killer for hire" like he is in the comics.
- Deborah Ann Woll as Karen Page: A former reporter, Murdock's friend and former partner at the law firm Nelson, Murdock & Page
- Margarita Levieva as Heather Glenn / Muse: A therapist and Murdock's ex-girlfriend who has taken on the mantle of Muse from serial killer Bastian Cooper, her former patient whom she killed in the first season
- Matthew Lillard as Mr. Charles: An influential "power player" who recruits superpowered individuals for black ops missions. He works for CIA director Valentina Allegra de Fontaine.
- Arty Froushan as Buck Cashman: Fisk's right-hand man and fixer
- Zabryna Guevara as Sheila Rivera: Fisk's former mayoral campaign director who intends to succeed him by running for mayor of New York City
- Krysten Ritter as Jessica Jones:
  A former vigilante suffering from PTSD who runs her own detective agency, Alias Investigations. She has superhuman strength and limited flight abilities that intermittently malfunction.
- Mike Colter as Luke Cage: A former convict with superhuman strength and unbreakable skin who serves as Harlem's "sheriff". Showrunner Dario Scardapane said Cage would be a "big part" of the season.
- Finn Jones as Danny Rand / Iron Fist:
  A billionaire Buddhist monk, co-CEO of Rand Enterprises, and martial arts expert with the ability to call upon the mystical power of the Iron Fist. Jones described Rand in the season as "very, very grounded" with "a different quality to him", and felt the Born Again writers understood how to portray the character correctly, a criticism Jones and the character had received in Marvel's Netflix television series.
- Élodie Yung as Elektra Natchios:
  An assassin and former love interest of Murdock, who was previously used as the Black Sky weapon by the organization the Hand in the Netflix series The Defenders (2017). She was presumed dead after the events of the series.

=== Guest ===
- Royce Johnson as Brett Mahoney: A New York Police Department (NYPD) Chief of Detectives and longtime ally of Murdock, Page, and their late friend Foggy Nelson

Additionally, returning characters from previous seasons include Cole North, a former New York Police Department (NYPD) sergeant and member of Fisk's defunct Anti-Vigilante Task Force (AVTF) who is in prison; and Danielle, the daughter of Jessica and Cage.

== Production ==
=== Development ===
In February 2025, Marvel Studios executive Brad Winderbaum said Daredevil: Born Again could continue beyond the second season, with the strong audience response to the first season giving the studio confidence to make the series "annually into the future". In July, star Vincent D'Onofrio said the studio had plans for a third season but an official renewal was dependent on audience responses to the second season. D'Onofrio reiterated a month later that both he and fellow co-star Charlie Cox believed a third season was likely, while Variety reported that chances of a third season renewal were "promising". Winderbaum confirmed the third season renewal in September 2025, and showrunner Dario Scardapane confirmed a month later that he was returning for the season. Filmmaking duo Justin Benson and Aaron Moorhead, Iain B. MacDonald, and Solvan "Slick" Naim also return to direct episodes of the season. The series is released under Marvel Studios' "Marvel Television" label.

In September 2026, the third season was reported to be the series' last and Scardapane was revealed to have left the series after his contract was not renewed by Marvel. The Hollywood Reporter called Scardapane's departure "eyebrow-raising" since it was in the middle of the season's post-production work, although they reported that work was in its "final stages". Despite Winderbaum's previous comments about hoping to continue the series for an undetermined number of seasons, he said the third season had been planned as a conclusion for the series from the beginning and Marvel had decided to mirror the three-season run of the original Daredevil (2015–2018) series. Cox also stated that the production had known going into the third season that it was likely to be the last, so there was "more planning and emotional support" for the ending than with the original series' cancelation.

=== Writing ===
The writers' room for the season began work by October 11, 2025. Heather Bellson, Jesse Wigutow, Chantelle Wells, and Omar Najam returned as writers from previous seasons, joined by newcomer Ryan Farley. The season finale was still being written by late April 2026. Wigutow said the season, while a continuation from the previous two, would go in a new direction. Executive producer Sana Amanat said the writers were hoping to create a season that was "more stripped-down, back-to-basics" for Matt Murdock / Daredevil, coming up with ideas that had not been done before. Scardapane said the series would return to the tone and street-level storytelling of Frank Miller's Daredevil comics following the conclusion of Wilson Fisk / Kingpin's mayor storyline in season two. Scardapane believed whatever came after the Mayor Fisk storyline still needed to feel like a continuation of that, with everything "moving in the same direction and is all part of a piece", even if the dynamic between Murdock and Fisk was no longer the focal point of the series.

At the end of the second season, Murdock publicly outs himself as Daredevil and is arrested. Scardapane said there would not be any "buybacks" of the public knowing that Murdock is Daredevil, which allowed the third season to explore new storytelling opportunities. Comic book storylines where Murdock is in prison include "The Devil in Cell-Block D" from Daredevil vol. 2 #82–87 (2006), and "Doing Time" and "Lockdown" respectively from Daredevil vol. 6 #26–30 and #31–36 (both 2021). Scardapane confirmed that "The Devil in Cell-Block D" was an influence on the season, and was excited to show a lawyer entering the justice system to pay for his own crimes. Meanwhile, Fisk goes into exile which Scardapane said was also pulling from a specific comic run. He explained that the writers did not want to keep elevating Fisk after he became mayor, for example making him President of the United States, feeling that would be a "bizarro" storyline similar to when Jack Ryan becomes president in that franchise. Instead, the writers show Fisk falling and having to build himself back up without his wife, Vanessa, or any "network of power". Scardapane said the season begins with "one man in jail, one man in exile... They've been put in their separate corners for a moment."

Scardapane said there would be new villains in the season, in addition to Fisk and Benjamin "Dex" Poindexter / Bullseye. Among them is Heather Glenn, who takes on the mantle of the serial killer Muse. This continues the Muse storyline that was inherited from the initial take for the series, which Scardapane felt they did not do justice to when resolving it in the first season. After exploring Glenn's trauma in the second season, Scardapane enjoyed having a Muse in the third season that has gone through character development and "isn't just dropped in". The season also continues the redemption storyline for Cole North that began in the second season.

The third season is set six months after the events of the second. It continues Scardapane's creative goal for Born Again to cover the "world" of all of Marvel's Netflix television series, bringing back characters such as Danny Rand / Iron Fist and Elektra Natchios, following the second season's return of Jessica Jones and Luke Cage. Scardapane said the third season would expand on Cage's story following his brief appearance at the end of the second, exploring his relationship with Jessica, their daughter Danielle, and the work he did overseas for Mr. Charles.

Crew merchandise for the season included a T-shirt with the "Daredevil" lettering composed of various different comic book issues, which Nick Staniforth from Total Film felt were the inspirations for the season. These included Daredevil vol. 6 #25 (2021), which shows Matt Murdock in prison; The Defenders vol. 5 #2 (2017), representing the return of the Defenders from the Netflix series; Daredevil vol. 1 #181, where Bullseye kills Elektra; and Daredevil: Unleash Hell – Red Band #3 (2025), the series which introduced the female Muse, Morgan Whittier.

=== Casting ===
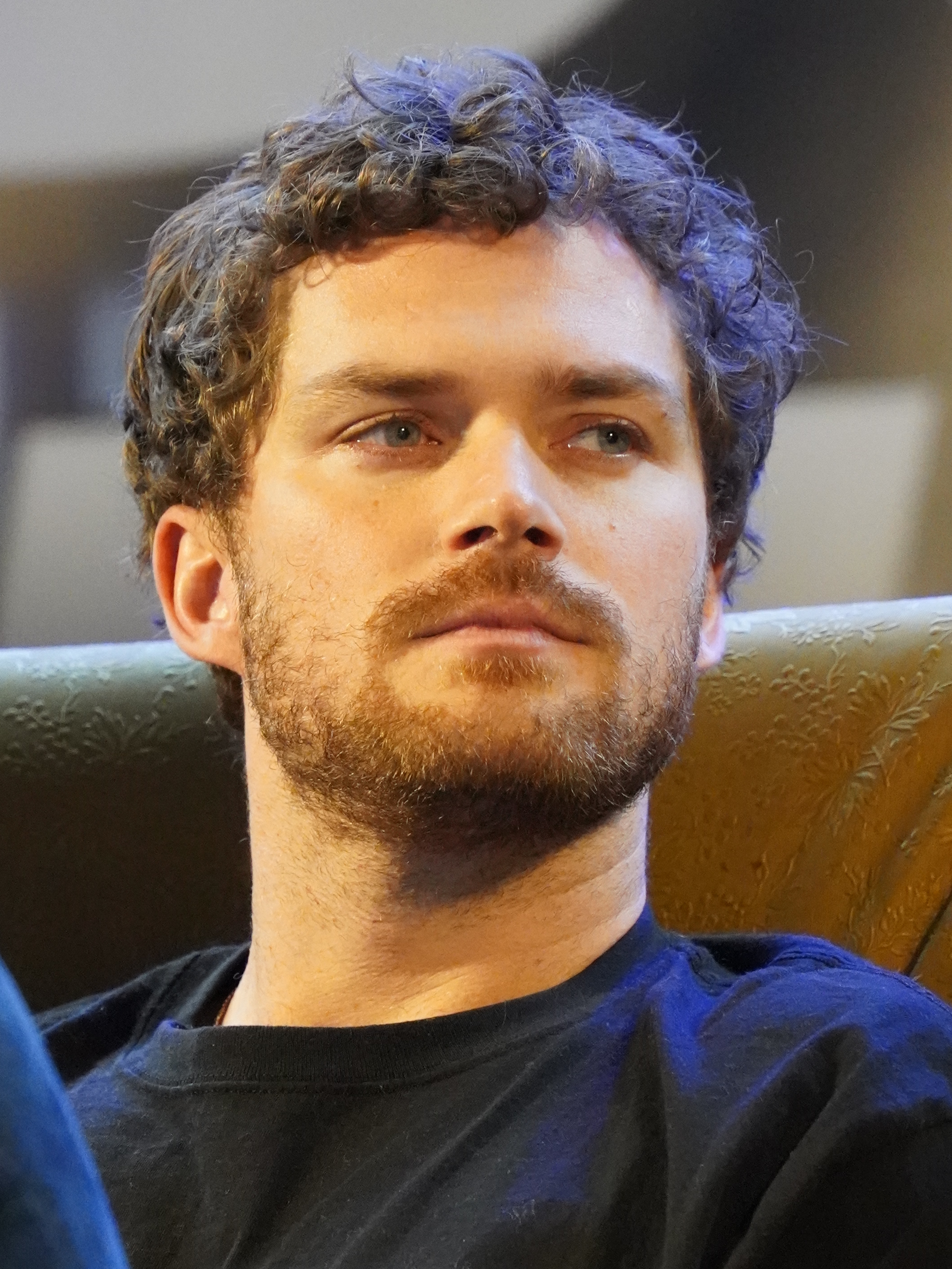
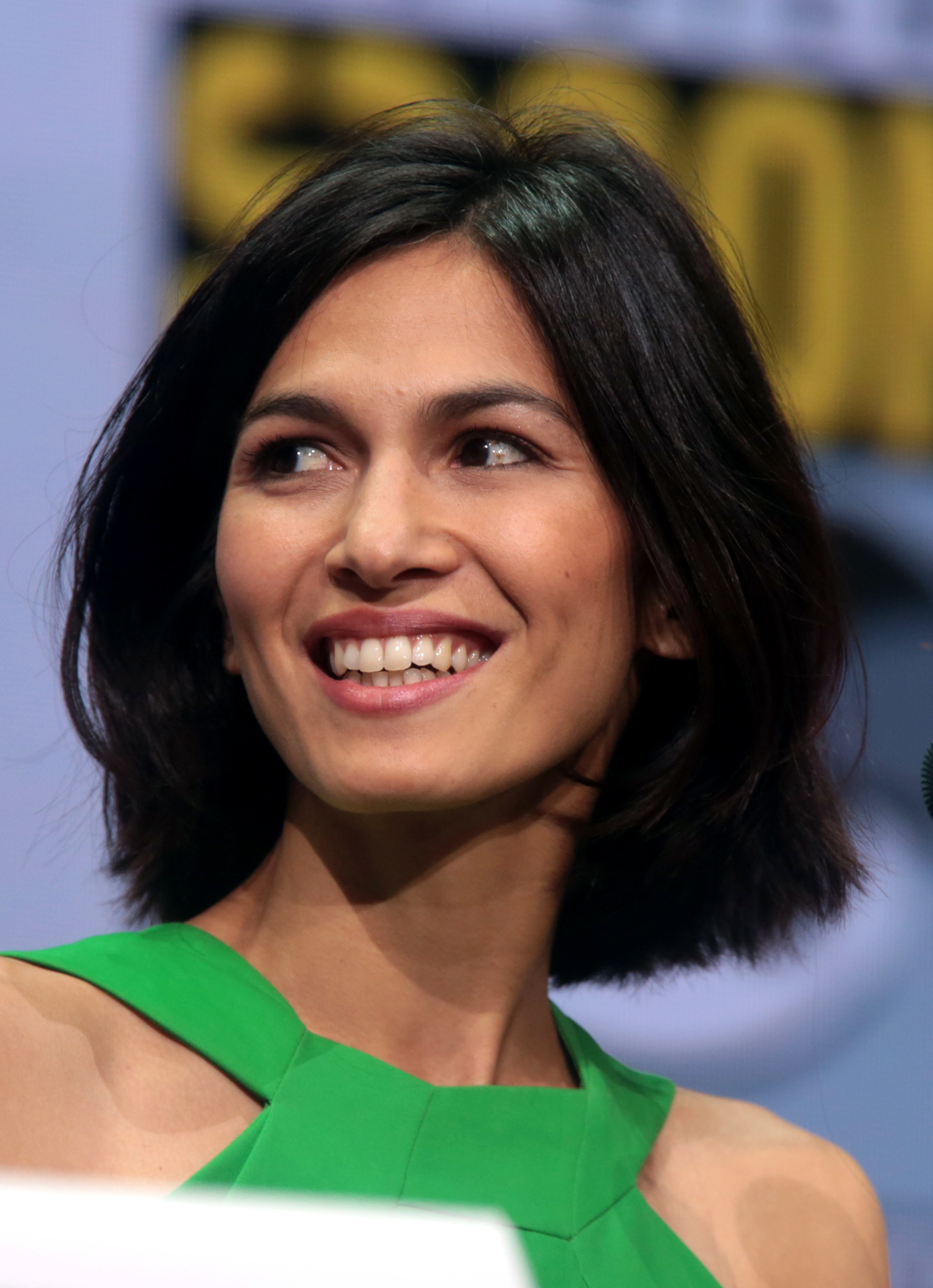
Finn Jones and Élodie Yung reprised their respective roles as Danny Rand / Iron Fist and Elektra Natchios from Marvel's Netflix television series.

Main cast members returning from the previous seasons include Charlie Cox as Matt Murdock / Daredevil, Vincent D'Onofrio as Wilson Fisk / Kingpin, Wilson Bethel as Dex Poindexter / Bullseye, Deborah Ann Woll as Karen Page, Margarita Levieva as Heather Glenn / Muse, Matthew Lillard as Mr. Charles, Arty Froushan as Buck Cashman, Zabryna Guevara as Sheila Rivera, and Krysten Ritter as Jessica Jones.

In April 2026, set photos revealed that Mike Colter and Finn Jones were reprising their respective roles as Luke Cage and Danny Rand / Iron Fist from Marvel's Netflix television series, after Colter made an appearance in the second-season finale. In June, more set photos revealed that Élodie Yung was reprising her role as Elektra Natchios from the Netflix series, while Royce Johnson was confirmed to be returning as Brett Mahoney the following month. In August, Jessica Henwick said she discussed reprising her Netflix role of Colleen Wing in the season, but she and the creative team decided against this because she would not have had a large role. Henwick was happy with the character's ending in the second season of Iron Fist (2018) and only wanted to return if there was a good story reason.

=== Design ===
Michael Shaw returns as production designer from previous seasons. Dex wears a new, more comic-accurate Bullseye costume in the season. Based on set photos confirming Colter's appearance in the season, Casey Loving from TheWrap noted that he was wearing a similar three-piece yellow suit that the character was seen in at the end of the second season of Luke Cage (2018) and his final Marvel's Netflix series appearance in the third season of Jessica Jones (2019). Glenn's Muse costume features the character's signature mask under a black wig and a gray beanie, reminiscent of Whittier's Muse. Natchios wears a black sleeveless jumpsuit with red accents and sports two waist holsters for a pair of sai, the character's signature weapons.

=== Filming ===
Principal photography began by March 5, 2026, under the working title Out the Kitchen 3, with MacDonald, Benson and Moorhead, Naim, and Wilkinson as directors. Soundstage work occurs at Silvercup Studios in Queens. Also returning from previous seasons are Jeffrey Waldron as cinematographer, and Philip Silvera as stunt coordinator and second unit director. Filming had previously been reported to begin on March 6. The season was shot in two-episode blocks. Woll, Guevara, Ritter, Colter, and Jones filmed scenes in Brooklyn in early April. Set dressing showed posters indicating that Rivera was campaigning to become mayor of New York City. The same month, D'Onofrio and Levieva were seen filming in New York and Queens, respectively, with Levieva dressed as Muse. Filming was halfway complete on May 5. At the end of the month, Bethel, Colter, and Jones filmed scenes on Randalls Island. In late June, D'Onofrio and Yung were seen filming in Dumbo. In early July, Cox and Yung filmed scenes in Downtown Manhattan. Filming wrapped on July 21.

=== Post-production ===
Amelia Allwarden is an editor on the season. She previously worked on the MCU miniseries Echo (2024) and VisionQuest (2026).

== Marketing ==
Cox, Ritter, and Jones promoted the season during a Marvel Television and Marvel Animation panel at New York Comic Con 2026 in October, where footage was shown.

== Release ==
The season is set to premiere in March 2027, and will consist of eight episodes. It will be part of Phase Six of the Marvel Cinematic Universe (MCU).
