= Daredevil: Born Again =

2025 Marvel Studios television series

- Genre: Action-adventure; Crime drama; Legal drama; Superhero
- Created by: Dario Scardapane; Matt Corman; Chris Ord
- Based on: Marvel Comics
- Showrunner: Dario Scardapane
- Starring: Charlie Cox; Vincent D'Onofrio; Margarita Levieva; Deborah Ann Woll; Elden Henson; Wilson Bethel; Zabryna Guevara; Nikki M. James; Genneya Walton; Arty Froushan; Clark Johnson; Michael Gandolfini; Ayelet Zurer; Kamar de los Reyes; Jon Bernthal; Mohan Kapur; Tony Dalton; Matthew Lillard; Lili Taylor; Toby Leonard Moore; Krysten Ritter; Mike Colter; Finn Jones; Élodie Yung
- Composer: The Newton Brothers
- Country of origin: United States
- Original language: English
- No. of seasons: 2
- No. of episodes: 17

Production
- Executive producers: Justin Benson Aaron Moorhead; Matt Corman; Chris Ord; Dario Scardapane; Chris Gary; Sana Amanat; Brad Winderbaum; Louis D'Esposito; Kevin Feige; Charlie Cox; Vincent D'Onofrio; Iain B. MacDonald
- Producers: Rudd Simmons; David Chambers
- Production location: New York
- Cinematography: Hillary Fyfe Spera; Pedro Gómez Millán; Jeffrey Waldron
- Editors: Cedric Nairn-Smith; Melissa Lawson Cheung; Stephanie Filo; Lyric Ramsey; Yoni Rusnak; Amelia Allwarden
- Running time: 42–60 minutes
- Production company: Marvel Television

Original release
- Network: Disney+
- Release: March 4, 2025 – present

Related
- Daredevil; Echo; The Punisher: One Last Kill; Marvel Cinematic Universe television series

Daredevil: Born Again is an American television series created by Dario Scardapane and Matt Corman & Chris Ord for the streaming service Disney+, based on Marvel Comics featuring the character Daredevil. It is the 13th television series in the Marvel Cinematic Universe (MCU) from Marvel Studios and was produced under its Marvel Television label. The series shares continuity with the films and television series of the MCU. Born Again is a revival and continuation of Daredevil (2015–2018), an earlier series produced by the previous Marvel Television production company and originally released on Netflix. Scardapane serves as showrunner with Justin Benson and Aaron Moorhead as lead directors.

Charlie Cox reprises his role as Matt Murdock / Daredevil from Marvel's Netflix television series and prior Marvel Studios productions, starring alongside Vincent D'Onofrio, Margarita Levieva, Deborah Ann Woll, Elden Henson, Wilson Bethel, Zabryna Guevara, Nikki M. James, Genneya Walton, Arty Froushan, Clark Johnson, Michael Gandolfini, Ayelet Zurer, and Tony Dalton. Kamar de los Reyes, Jon Bernthal, and Mohan Kapur also star in the first season, while Matthew Lillard, Lili Taylor, Toby Leonard Moore, and Krysten Ritter join the cast for the second season, and Mike Colter, Finn Jones, and Élodie Yung join for the third season.

Following the cancellation of Daredevil in 2018, Cox and D'Onofrio reprised their roles for Marvel Studios starting in 2021. A new Daredevil series entered development in early 2022, with Corman and Ord attached as head writers by that May. They gave the series an episodic structure and lighter tone than the Netflix series. Born Again was announced in July 2022 with a planned 18-episode first season. The subtitle references the 1986 comic book storyline "Born Again" by Frank Miller and David Mazzucchelli, but the series does not adapt that storyline. Marvel Studios decided to overhaul the series by late September 2023 and released Corman and Ord. Scardapane, Benson, and Moorhead were hired the following month to make the series more serialized and directly connected to the Netflix series. The planned 18 episodes were split into two seasons. Filming took place in New York.

Daredevil: Born Again premiered on Disney+ on March 4, 2025, with the nine-episode first season being released through April as part of Phase Five of the MCU. It received positive reviews from critics, although the seams of the creative overhaul were noted. The eight-episode second season was released from March to May 2026, and was seen as an improvement over the first by critics. It was followed by the Marvel Television Special Presentation television special The Punisher: One Last Kill, which stars Bernthal and was conceived during filming of the first season. A third and final season is in production and set to premiere in March 2027. The final two seasons and One Last Kill are part of Phase Six of the MCU.

== Premise ==
Daredevil: Born Again begins several years after the events of Daredevil (2015–2018), and a year after blind lawyer Matt Murdock stopped his activities as the masked vigilante Daredevil. In the first season, Murdock continues his fight for justice as a lawyer while former crime boss Wilson Fisk is elected mayor of New York City, putting the pair on a collision course. After Fisk consolidates power, declares martial law, and begins targeting vigilantes, the second season sees him hunting Daredevil. Murdock goes underground and gathers allies to resist Fisk's corruption and his Anti-Vigilante Task Force (AVTF).

== Cast and characters ==
- Charlie Cox as Matt Murdock / Daredevil:
  A blind lawyer with superhuman senses from Hell's Kitchen, New York, who leads a double life as a masked vigilante. Cox appreciated being able to first reprise his role from Marvel's Netflix television series in the film Spider-Man: No Way Home (2021) and the Disney+ series She-Hulk: Attorney at Law (2022), since he was able to have "a bit of fun" and see Murdock interact with characters that the original Daredevil (2015–2018) series was unable to feature. They could then "set our own tone" with Born Again and "explore and develop all of the possibilities of his life back in New York". Cox began training for the role by October 2022, focusing on mixed martial arts (MMA) in the hope of portraying Murdock as someone who has training in various fight styles that he can employ depending on who he is fighting, rather than just being an all-around brawler.
- Vincent D'Onofrio as Wilson Fisk / Kingpin:
  A powerful businessman and crime lord, who is mayor of New York City. D'Onofrio said the tone for his character in the Disney+ series Echo (2024) would continue in Born Again, which he believed was how the character was best portrayed. After gaining 40 pounds (18 kg) for the role in Daredevil, D'Onofrio chose to wear a fat suit for Born Again as he had done starting with his appearance in the Disney+ series Hawkeye (2021). D'Onofrio thought the fat suit had progressed with modern technology to be lighter and more realistic, and he was happy not to have to gain the weight. D'Onofrio added that other techniques were used to "sell the size", and said the character's size at the end of the first season would be "more specific and more detailed" for reasons related to the second season.
- Margarita Levieva as Heather Glenn / Muse:
  A therapist and Murdock's new love interest, who becomes Fisk's Commissioner of Mental Health and later takes on the mantle of the masked serial killer Muse. She and Murdock have differing views on vigilantism. Levieva believed Glenn was the first girlfriend Murdock was "truly committed to". After being stalked and almost killed by Muse in the first season, Glenn embraces the role of the killer heading into the third season.
- Deborah Ann Woll as Karen Page:
  A former reporter and Murdock's friend and partner at the Nelson, Murdock & Page law firm. Showrunner Dario Scardapane said Page was "the heart and soul of this mythology" and her interactions with Murdock bring more humanity out of him.
- Elden Henson as Franklin "Foggy" Nelson:
  Murdock's best friend and law partner. Cox described Nelson as "the heartbeat" of the Marvel Cinematic Universe (MCU) and viewed his death in the first season as "really hard".
- Wilson Bethel as Benjamin "Dex" Poindexter / Bullseye:
  A psychopathic assassin and former FBI agent who is a highly skilled marksman capable of using almost any object as a lethal projectile. After Dex masqueraded as Daredevil for Fisk in Daredevil, Fisk broke Dex's back and he underwent surgery that enhanced his body.
- Zabryna Guevara as Sheila Rivera: Fisk's mayoral campaign director
- Nikki M. James as Kirsten McDuffie: A former New York assistant district attorney and Murdock's new law partner at the law firm Murdock & McDuffie
- Genneya Walton as BB Urich: A journalist for The BB Report and the niece of Ben Urich, who was killed by Fisk in Daredevil
- Arty Froushan as Buck Cashman: Fisk's right-hand man and fixer
- Clark Johnson as Cherry:
  A retired New York Police Department (NYPD) officer who works as an investigator at Murdock & McDuffie. Johnson modeled Cherry after Roy Scheider's character Buddy "Cloudy" Russo in the film The French Connection (1971).
- Michael Gandolfini as Daniel Blake: Fisk's protégé and member of his mayoral campaign
- Ayelet Zurer as Vanessa Fisk:
  Wilson's wife, who took over his criminal empire while he was away, leading to tension between the couple. Sandrine Holt was originally cast in the role for the series before Zurer, who portrayed Vanessa in Daredevil, was brought back after the creative overhaul of Born Again.
- Kamar de los Reyes as Hector Ayala / White Tiger: A vigilante represented by Murdock whose superhuman abilities come from the mystical Amulet of Power
- Jon Bernthal as Frank Castle / Punisher: A vigilante who, following the brutal murder of his family, aims to fight the criminal underworld by any means necessary, no matter how lethal the results are
- Mohan Kapur as Yusuf Khan: A Pakistani-American citizen from Jersey City who works as an assistant bank manager at New York Mutual and is the father of the superhero Kamala Khan / Ms. Marvel
- Tony Dalton as Jack Duquesne / Swordsman: A wealthy socialite who is secretly a sword-wielding vigilante
- Matthew Lillard as Mr. Charles:
  An influential "power player" who works for CIA director Valentina Allegra de Fontaine and becomes an antagonist for Fisk at the "politics and international diplomacy" level
- Lili Taylor as Marge McCaffrey: The governor of New York who is a political opponent to Fisk
- Toby Leonard Moore as James Wesley: Fisk's former right-hand man and friend who was killed by Page in Daredevil
- Krysten Ritter as Jessica Jones:
  A former superhero suffering from PTSD who runs her own detective agency, Alias Investigations, and becomes Murdock's resistance ally. She has superhuman strength and limited flight abilities that intermittently malfunction.
- Mike Colter as Luke Cage: A former convict with superhuman strength and unbreakable skin who serves as Harlem's "sheriff" and has done work overseas for Mr. Charles
- Finn Jones as Danny Rand / Iron Fist: A billionaire Buddhist monk, co-CEO of Rand Enterprises, and martial arts expert with the ability to call upon the mystical power of the Iron Fist
- Élodie Yung as Elektra Natchios:
  An assassin and former love interest of Murdock, who was previously used as the Black Sky weapon by the organization the Hand in Marvel's Netflix television series The Defenders (2017). She was presumed dead after the events of that series.

== Episodes ==
Season	Episodes	Originally released	
Season	Episodes	First released	Last released
1	9	March 4, 2025	April 15, 2025
2	8	March 24, 2026	May 5, 2026
3	8	March 2027	TBA

=== Season 1 (2025) ===
No. overall	No. in season	Title	Directed by	Written by	Original release date
1	1	"Heaven's Half Hour"	Aaron Moorhead & Justin Benson	Dario Scardapane	March 4, 2025
2	2	"Optics"	Michael Cuesta	Matt Corman & Chris Ord	March 4, 2025
3	3	"The Hollow of His Hand"	Michael Cuesta	Jill Blankenship	March 11, 2025
4	4	"Sic Semper Systema"	Jeffrey Nachmanoff	David Feige and Jesse Wigutow	March 18, 2025
5	5	"With Interest"	Jeffrey Nachmanoff	Grainne Godfree	March 25, 2025
6	6	"Excessive Force"	David Boyd	Thomas Wong	March 25, 2025
7	7	"Art for Art's Sake"	David Boyd	Jill Blankenship	April 1, 2025
8	8	"Isle of Joy"	Justin Benson & Aaron Moorhead	Jesse Wigutow & Dario Scardapane	April 8, 2025
9	9	"Straight to Hell"	Aaron Moorhead & Justin Benson	Heather Bellson & Dario Scardapane	April 15, 2025

=== Season 2 (2026) ===
No. overall	No. in season	Title	Directed by	Written by	Original release date
10	1	"The Northern Star"	Aaron Moorhead & Justin Benson	Dario Scardapane	March 24, 2026
11	2	"Shoot the Moon"	Justin Benson & Aaron Moorhead	Dario Scardapane	March 31, 2026
12	3	"The Scales & the Sword"	Solvan "Slick" Naim	Heather Bellson	March 31, 2026
13	4	"Gloves Off"	Solvan "Slick" Naim	Chantelle M. Wells	April 7, 2026
14	5	"The Grand Design"	Angela Barnes	Jesse Wigutow	April 14, 2026
15	6	"Requiem"	Angela Barnes	Devon Kliger & Jesse Wigutow	April 21, 2026
16	7	"The Hateful Darkness"	Iain B. MacDonald	Heather Bellson	April 28, 2026
17	8	"The Southern Cross"	Iain B. MacDonald	Dario Scardapane & Jesse Wigutow	May 5, 2026

=== Season 3 ===
No. overall	No. in season	Title	Directed by	Written by	Original release date
18	1	TBA	Iain B. MacDonald	TBD	March 2027

== Production ==
=== Background ===
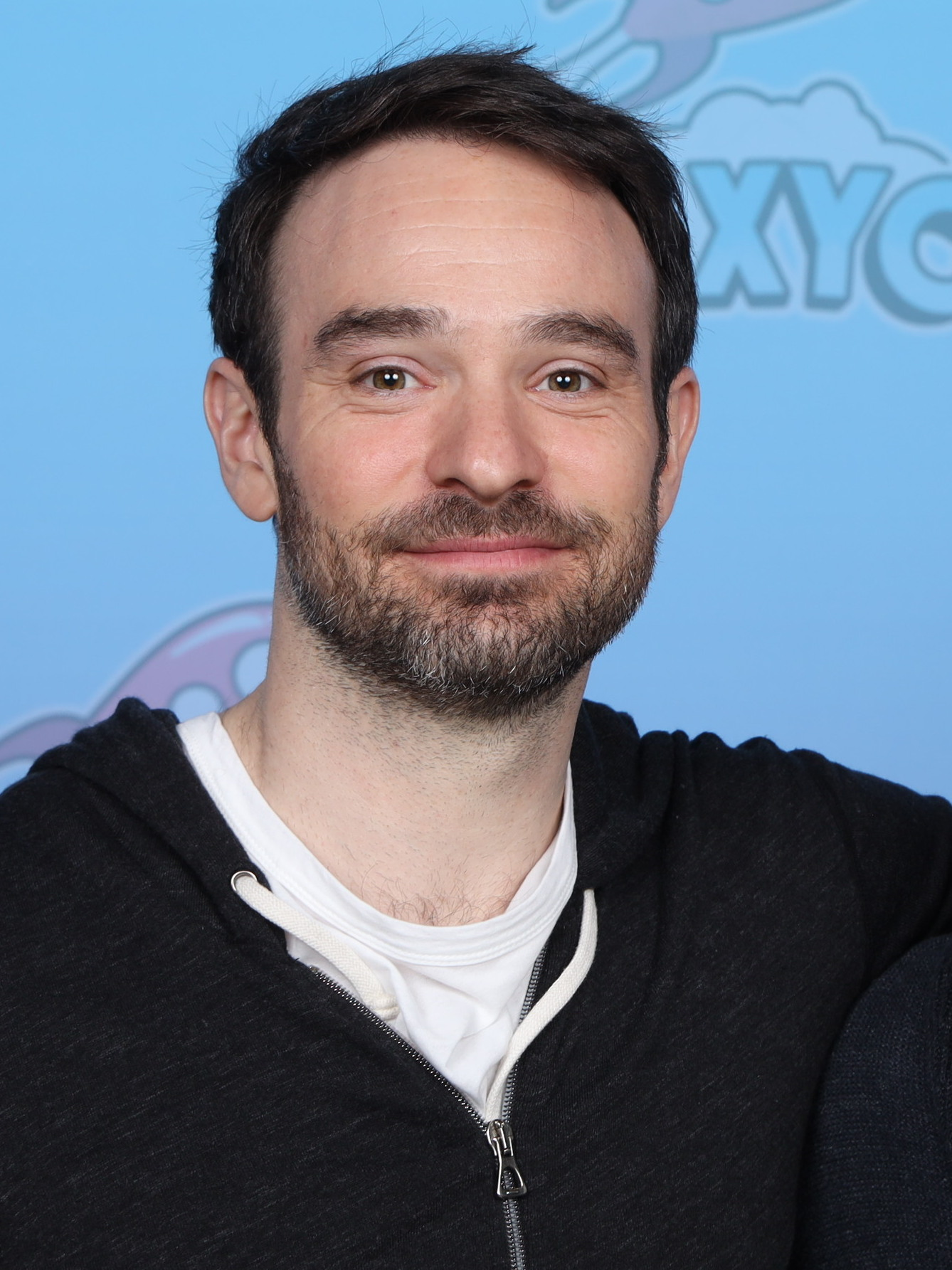
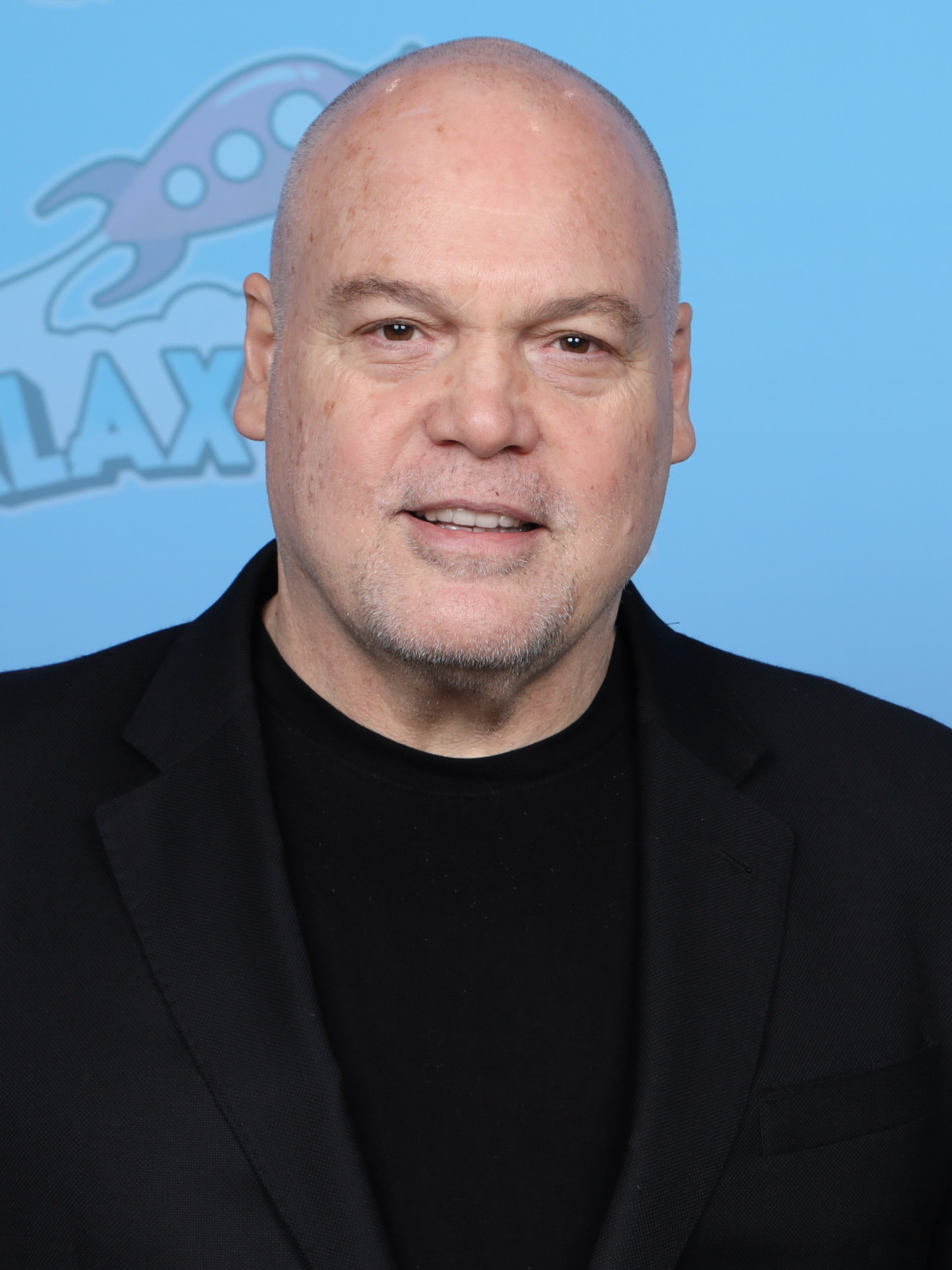
Work on Daredevil: Born Again began after Charlie Cox (left) and Vincent D'Onofrio (right) reprised their Daredevil roles for Marvel Studios in 2021.

The television series Daredevil, based on the Marvel Comics character Daredevil and produced by Marvel Television and ABC Studios, premiered on Netflix in April 2015, and lasted for three seasons until its cancellation in November 2018. Netflix said the three seasons would remain on the service, while the title character would "live on in future projects for Marvel". Deadline Hollywood noted that, unlike some of the other Marvel series on Netflix that were also canceled, "the door seems to be wide open" for the series to continue elsewhere, potentially on Disney's streaming service Disney+. However, The Hollywood Reporter said this was unlikely, especially since, as reported by Variety, the original deal between Marvel and Netflix stipulated that the characters could not appear in any non-Netflix series or films for at least two years following the cancellation of Daredevil. Kevin A. Mayer, chairman of Walt Disney Direct-to-Consumer and International, said there was a possibility that Disney+ could revive the series but this had not yet been discussed. Hulu's senior vice president of originals, Craig Erwich, said his streaming service was also open to reviving the series.

Star Charlie Cox was saddened by the cancellation, explaining that he was excited by the plans for a fourth season, which he and the rest of the cast and crew had expected to be made. He was hopeful there would be an opportunity to portray Matt Murdock / Daredevil again in some form. Amy Rutberg, who portrayed Marci Stahl in the series, said the cast and crew had expected it to last for five seasons, with a new antagonist being introduced in the fourth season before a final showdown between Daredevil and Vincent D'Onofrio's Wilson Fisk / Kingpin in the fifth. When Marvel Studios began discussions about continuing the Daredevil franchise within their shared universe, the Marvel Cinematic Universe (MCU), studio president Kevin Feige insisted they bring back Cox and D'Onofrio, feeling the pair were as "inextricably linked" to their characters as MCU actors Robert Downey Jr. and Chris Evans were to Tony Stark / Iron Man and Steve Rogers / Captain America, respectively. Feige contacted Cox in June 2020 about reprising his role as Murdock in the MCU, and he announced that Cox was returning for future Marvel Studios projects in December 2021. Cox first reprised his role in the film Spider-Man: No Way Home (2021), while D'Onofrio first reprised his role as Fisk in the Disney+ series Hawkeye (2021). Daredevil was moved from Netflix to Disney+ in March 2022 after Netflix's license for the series ended and Disney regained the rights.

=== Development ===
==== Initial work ====
Marvel Studios decided to make a new Daredevil-led series in January 2022, following the appearances of Cox in No Way Home and D'Onofrio in Hawkeye. Cox discussed such a series in March, believing it should begin a few years after the end of the previous series and be "re-imagined". Regarding whether it should be rated TV-MA as the Netflix series was, he believed Marvel Studios would be able to create a faithful version of the character without that rating. However, he found the comics "more exciting, readable, relatable when it lives in a darker space" such as Brian Michael Bendis and Alex Maleev's run on the comics, and he felt important attributes of the character such as his age, Catholic guilt, and history with women were more mature subjects. Cox was hopeful that a new series could have a more faithful adaptation of the 1986 comic book storyline "Born Again" by Frank Miller and David Mazzucchelli, which the original series took inspiration from for its third season. He described the storyline as "kind of a PG comic" and a guide for how the series could work with that rating.

Later in March, a Daredevil reboot series was reported to be in development with Marvel Studios' Feige and Chris Gary as producers. The series was confirmed to be in development for Disney+ in late May, with Matt Corman and Chris Ord attached as head writers and executive producers. The Hollywood Reporter and Deadline Hollywood both described it as a fourth season of the original series. During the 2022 San Diego Comic-Con in July, the series was officially announced as Daredevil: Born Again and was revealed to have 18 episodes for its first season. Cox said an 18-episode series was a "huge undertaking" and was chosen in part due to the many story possibilities that come with Murdock being a lawyer. Christian Holub at Entertainment Weekly believed the title was a reference to the character "literally being 'born again' into the official MCU" rather than the series being an adaptation of the "Born Again" storyline. Cox described Born Again as a "whole new thing" and not a fourth season of the Netflix series, which he felt was "the way to go. If you are going to do it again, do it differently." D'Onofrio reiterated this, saying they had few plans to connect to the original. He added that they were working on two seasons and there would be "gigantic payoffs" during the second.

Directors were hired for blocks of episodes: Michael Cuesta joined in March 2023 to direct the first two episodes; Jeffrey Nachmanoff joined in May to direct the third and fourth episodes; David Boyd directed the fifth and sixth episodes; and Clark Johnson, a director on the Marvel Netflix series Luke Cage (2016–2018), also joined in May to direct another two episodes. Actor Tom Hiddleston, who portrays Loki in the MCU and is a close friend of Cox, was also hired to direct an episode in the later half of the season.

==== Creative overhaul ====
By late September 2023, while production was on hold due to the 2023 Hollywood labor disputes, Marvel Studios decided to overhaul the series with a new creative direction. Filming for six episodes was largely completed by then. The studio reviewed that footage and decided Born Again "wasn't working". Corman and Ord were let go as head writers, as were the directors for the remainder of the series, and the studio began searching for new writers and directors. The Hollywood Reporter reported that Corman and Ord's episodic take was a large divergence from the Netflix series, including that Cox did not appear in costume as Daredevil until the fourth episode. Marvel planned to retain some elements that had been shot, add new serialized elements, and move closer to the tone of the Netflix series. Corman and Ord would still be credited as executive producers.

Cox and D'Onofrio had not been convinced that the original approach was working, with Cox saying it was confusing that Born Again was not a direct continuation of the Netflix series or a complete reboot. Brad Winderbaum, the head of streaming, television, and animation at Marvel Studios, said the studio believed they could "play it loose" with the history of Daredevil, wanting to keep Cox and D'Onofrio but otherwise "reset" to avoid alienating new viewers. Cox said Daredevil and Kingpin were essentially being treated like alternate universe "variants", a concept from previous MCU projects, but he said some people did not understand this and found the approach to be disingenuous. Cox was also concerned that the new series was "unlearning" lessons from the 2003 Daredevil film which he felt had made the original series a success, saying "the character really does work best in a serialized platform, but also when it's darker and grittier and there's less tongue-in-cheek levity". The studio realized they had to either fully embrace the Netflix series or start over fresh. D'Onofrio said Feige in particular listened to him and Cox when the pair expressed their concerns. Cox was grateful that their concerns were heard, and said "it takes a huge amount of courage and money to make a U-turn like that".

Dario Scardapane, a writer on Netflix's Daredevil spin-off series The Punisher (2017–2019), was hired to serve as showrunner for Born Again in October 2023. This came after Marvel changed its approach to television production to have more traditional showrunners rather than head writers. Filmmaking duo Justin Benson and Aaron Moorhead, who previously worked on the Marvel Studios series Moon Knight (2022) and the second season of Loki (2023), were hired to direct the remaining episodes of the first season. Soon after Scardapane joined, the creative team decided that Born Again should harken back to the tone of the Netflix series and continue storylines from it, rather than be a complete reset. Cox said there was a "fine balance to strike" with this approach, but thought the new creative direction had a good reason for "remaking it" while still being familiar.

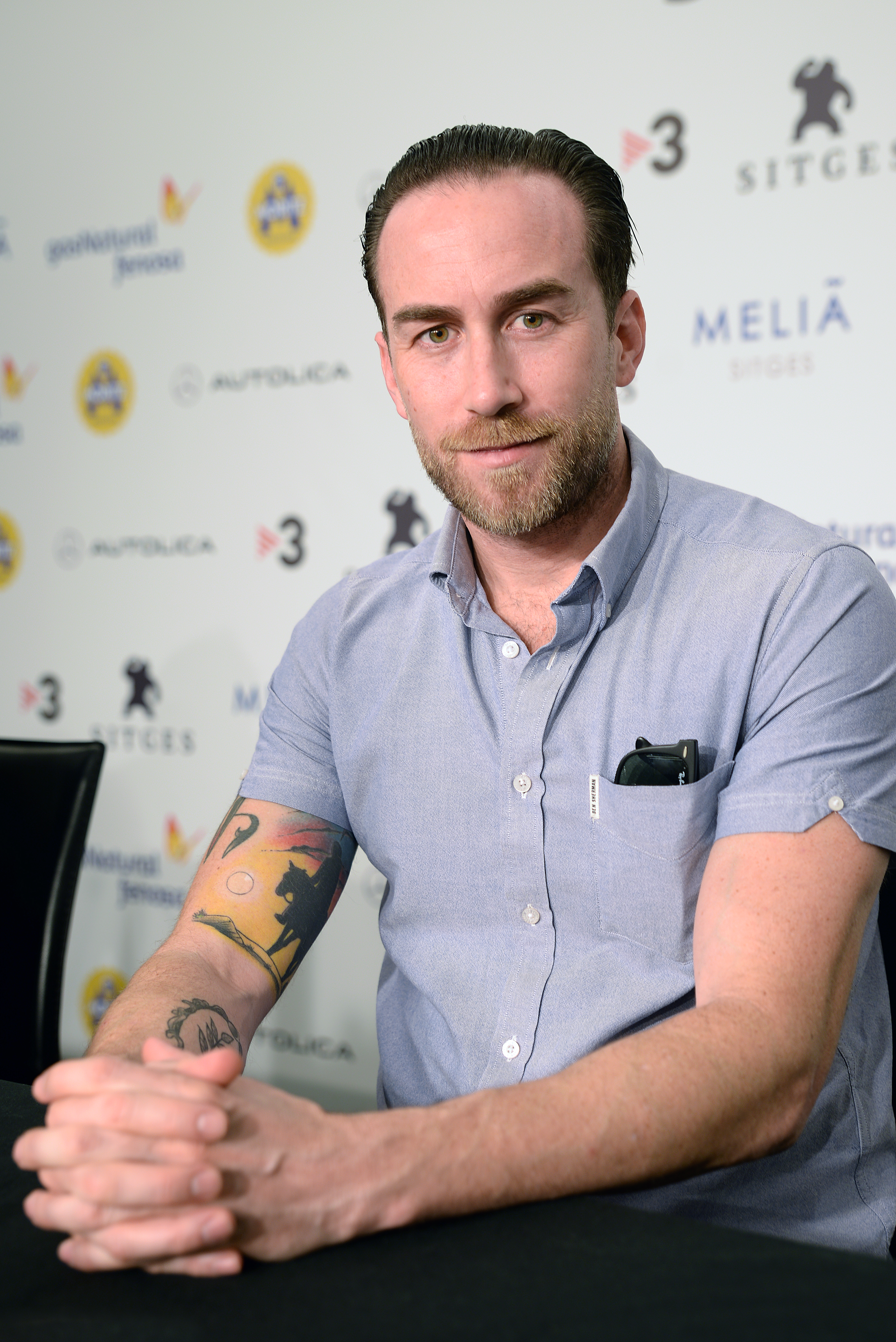
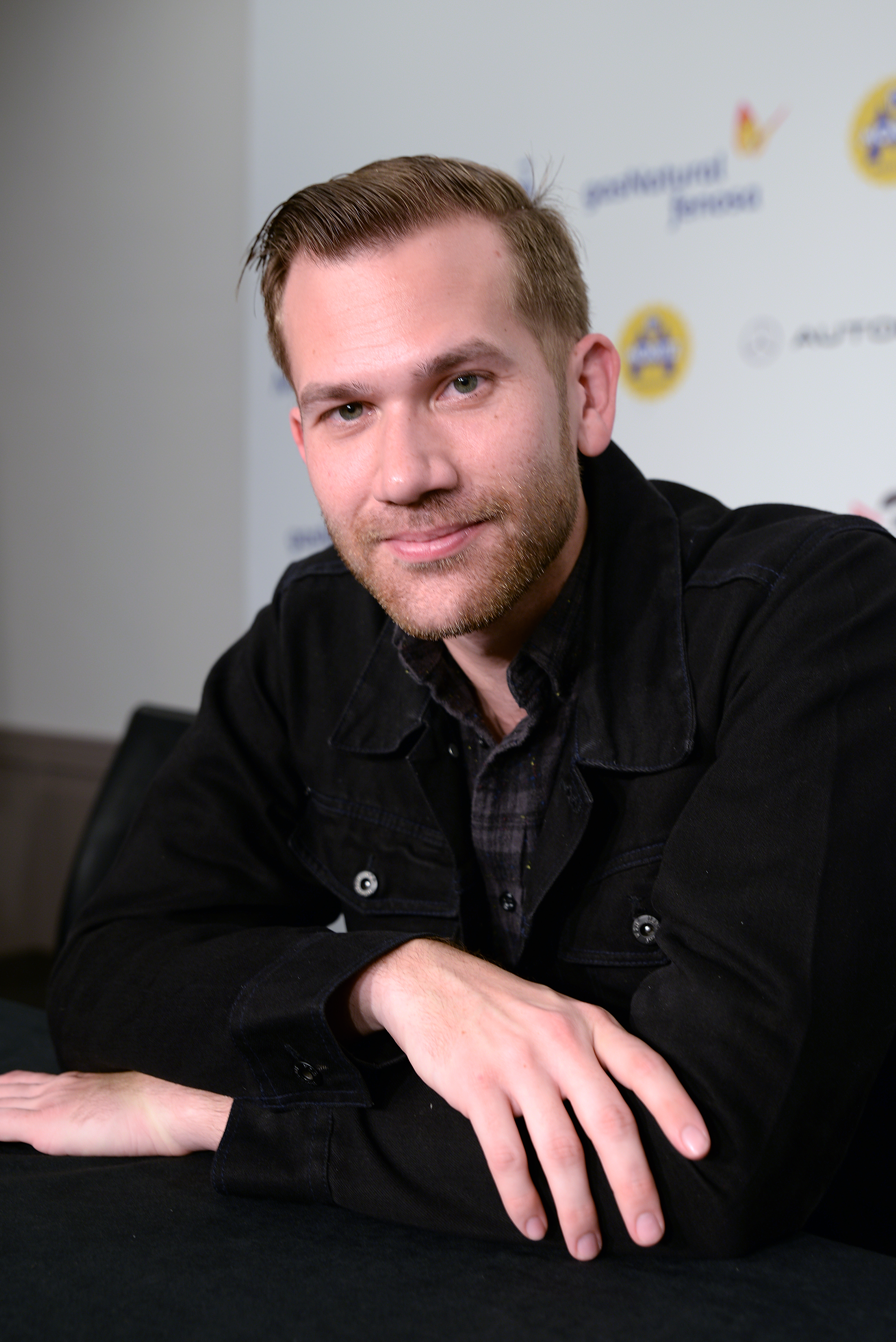
Justin Benson (left) and Aaron Moorhead (right) were hired as lead directors for Daredevil: Born Again after the series' creative overhaul.

In November 2023, Benson and Moorhead said they were reviewing the existing footage and looking to prior Daredevil content, including the Netflix series, to inform their direction, and said they were fans of Miller's "Born Again" run. They added that this was their first MCU project where they were able to find their footing early on after being "thrown in the deep end" with Moon Knight and Loki. They were also more comfortable working with the more grounded style of Born Again, which is similar to their independent films, compared to the "mind-bending sci-fi affairs" of those previous MCU projects. Moorhead described Born Again's stakes as "primal and graspable". D'Onofrio said the directors were Marvel's "hottest talent", and he was confident the series would work after they joined. His friend and Moon Knight co-star Ethan Hawke told D'Onofrio about his positive experience working with the pair, and D'Onofrio was a fan of their work on Loki, particularly how they handled violence.

Three new episodes were written, including a new pilot episode, as well as additional scenes for the previously shot episodes. Cox confirmed in May 2024 that nine episodes had been filmed, which Feige said was the first season of Born Again. Cuesta, Nachmanoff, and Boyd were re-confirmed as credited directors in August 2024. Some of their episodes had "some rejiggering, and [new] framing, and bookends" added while others were left as is. Nachmanoff and Boyd returned to film new footage for the existing episodes and assisted Benson and Moorhead with blending the style of the original episodes with the new material. Cox said the overhauled series was more in line with the original, while D'Onofrio he and other original crew members were pleased with the new iteration.

==== Subsequent seasons ====
Also in August 2024, Feige announced that a second season was planned; with the creative overhaul, it was decided that the planned 18-episode season would be split into two, nine-episode seasons. In February 2025, Scardapane, Benson, and Moorhead were confirmed to be returning for the second season, and Scardapane described its production as a "better-oiled machine". He said the second season would just be eight episodes. Additional directors for the season include Solvan "Slick" Naim, Angela Barnes, and Iain B. MacDonald.

Following the overhaul, Marvel Studios began looking at all of Marvel Television's Netflix series as more integral to the MCU, and retroactively added them to the MCU timeline on Disney+. Winderbaum said the studio was open to bringing back more characters and elements from Daredevil and the other Marvel Netflix series such as Elektra Natchios, the Hand, and Murdock's fellow Defenders—Jessica Jones, Luke Cage, and Danny Rand / Iron Fist. Scardapane had discussions about including Jones and Cage in the series from when he first joined. He later explained that all the Marvel Netflix series—Daredevil, Jessica Jones (2015–2019), Luke Cage (2016–2018), Iron Fist (2017–2018), the crossover miniseries The Defenders (2017), and The Punisher—were produced together, sharing soundstages and with their writers' rooms in the same building, creating a feeling that they were all part of one neighborhood. Scardapane said his creative goal for Born Again, particularly starting in the second season, was to expand the series to cover the world of all those shows.

In February 2025, Winderbaum said the series could continue beyond the second season, and that May he said the strong audience response to the first season gave Marvel Studios the confidence to make the series "annually into the future". In July, D'Onofrio said the studio had plans for a third season but an official renewal was dependent on audience responses to the second season. D'Onofrio reiterated a month later that both he and Cox believed a third season was likely, while Variety reported that chances of a third season renewal were "promising". Winderbaum confirmed the third season renewal in September, with Scardapane returning as showrunner. Benson, Moorhead, MacDonald, and Naim returned as directors, and were joined by Jet Wilkinson. In September 2026, the third season was reported to be the series' last and Scardapane was revealed to have left the series after his contract was not renewed by Marvel. The Hollywood Reporter called Scardapane's departure "eyebrow-raising" since it was in the middle of the season's post-production work, although they reported that work was in its "final stages". Despite Winderbaum's previous comments about hoping to continue the series for an undetermined number of seasons, he said the third season had been planned as a conclusion for the series from the beginning and Marvel had decided to mirror the three-season run of the original series, likening each to a trade paperback comic for Daredevil. Winderbaum said Marvel would "take a breath" following the series' conclusion and figure out where the character could appear next in the MCU. Cox also stated that the production had known going into the third season that it was likely to be the last, so there was "more planning and emotional support" for the ending than with the original series' cancelation.

Executive producers for Born Again include Marvel Studios' Feige, Louis D'Esposito, Winderbaum, and Sana Amanat, alongside Scardapane, Benson, and Moorhead. Additional executive producers include Marvel Studios' Gary as well as Corman and Ord for the first season, and MacDonald, Cox, and D'Onofrio for the second. Scardapane, Corman, and Ord are credited as the series' creators. David Chambers serves as producer for the second season. The series is released under Marvel Studios' "Marvel Television" label.

=== Writing ===
==== Approach ====
The initial take on the series was described as a legal procedural, with Feige explaining to Cox that the studio wanted to bring a traditional broadcast procedural into the world of streaming and felt it was a natural path to build such a series around a lawyer character that was already popular. Feige added that the studio was hoping to experiment with more episodic, "self-contained" episodes, unlike some of their Phase Four series that had a larger story split across multiple episodes. Cox said the initial take was dark but not as gory as the Netflix series. He wanted to take what worked from Daredevil and broaden it for Born Again to appeal to a younger audience. He also said early discussions for the series were about "reinvent[ing] the whole thing" and portraying Murdock as a different person from the one seen in the Netflix series. Murdock's friends Franklin "Foggy" Nelson and Karen Page were largely not acknowledged in this version. Amanat said the creative team struggled to incorporate them into the story, but Cox said there were discussions to do some "cool stuff" with them in the future.

Following the creative overhaul, serialized elements were set to be added. Scardapane said several elements in the original version worked well, but he felt there were storylines that needed to be added along with context from the Netflix series. His pilot acts as a bridge between the Netflix series and Born Again, beginning a few years after the end of Daredevil with Murdock, Nelson, and Page running their law firm and having a "pretty good rhythm" together. Winderbaum said Marvel Studios' approach to connecting Born Again with the Netflix series after the creative overhaul was influenced by how Loki and the animated series X-Men '97 (2024–present) honored prior iterations of their characters to establish new storylines. The cast said the events of the Netflix series were part of their characters' histories, and there are some new storylines that build on the original's events, but they did not want to dwell too much on past events or alienate new viewers who did not watch the Netflix series. Cox praised Scardapane's balance between respecting the Netflix series and not relying on that history too much. Co-star Jon Bernthal said any large diversions to the characters from the past were done for a reason, not simply for the sake of trying a different idea. Some of Scardapane's early ideas for the series were turned down due to Marvel Studios' larger plans for the MCU, but he otherwise had "leeway" to tell a specific Daredevil story. The character's appearances in Daredevil, No Way Home, and the Disney+ series She-Hulk: Attorney at Law (2022) are part of his history, but the series does not lean into all of those events. Scardapane said Marvel had "moved Matt through other corners of the MCU, and now he's back in his own story", which has a more serious tone.

Describing some of Born Again's differences from the Netflix series, Scardapane said the new series would have more fun character moments and "a lot less navel-gazing" than the original. He felt that series had been at its worst when featuring "two characters in a room talking about what a hero is" and was more interested in showing the characters doing things. Scardapane described Born Again as a "New York crime story", compared to the noir tone of the original series, taking inspiration from the series The Sopranos (1999–2007), the film King of New York (1990), and other crime media from the 1990s. Winderbaum likened Born Again to the series Game of Thrones (2011–2019) because it features "multiple factions [in New York City] vying for power in really complex ways". Another difference from Daredevil is the pace of episodes, with Scardapane explaining that there was an edict for the Marvel Netflix series to feature longer character scenes between their action sequences. This was not a requirement for Born Again which allowed the creative team to give it a pace and scope that the Netflix series were unable to. D'Onofrio said Born Again would have a similar tone and feel to the Disney+ series Echo (2024), and Scardapane said it would be darker than Daredevil which he felt only had some dark elements.

==== Storylines and characters ====
Despite using the Born Again subtitle, the series does not directly adapt that storyline or others from the comics. It also does not incorporate any of the planned material for the fourth season of Daredevil. At the beginning of Born Again, Murdock has not been Daredevil for a year after a "line was crossed", when Benjamin "Dex" Poindexter / Bullseye kills Nelson and Murdock tries to kill Dex in return. Amanat believed killing Nelson, who is Murdock's moral compass, was "the only thing that made sense" when telling a story about Murdock starting a new life without being Daredevil. Cox felt Nelson's death was an appropriate way to start the series, believing the new story needed to be "big, brave, and bold" and "shake things up" from the original. Scardapane said the series was a "two-hander", exploring both Murdock and Fisk.

The first season sees Fisk being elected mayor of New York City, after learning of the need for a strong candidate in the post-credits scene of Echo. Scardapane said the Mayor Fisk storyline was fun to explore but became too topical and moved the series away from "the large, mythological genre stuff" from the comics. He said the storyline would end with the second season and future seasons would return to the tone and street-level storytelling of Frank Miller's Daredevil comics. Scardapane felt the first two seasons were "Part 1" and "Part 2" of the same story, and said there was a "Part 3" to the Murdock and Fisk story that could be explored in the future. Amanat said the Murdock and Fisk storyline would "always be the heartbeat of this franchise... but there are also so many great characters and storylines" to also explore. The third season begins with Murdock in jail after publicly revealing that he is Daredevil at the end of the second season, while Fisk goes into exile. Scardapane said "they've been put in their separate corners for a moment" and both characters' new storylines were based on runs in the comics, with Murdock's taking inspiration from "The Devil in Cell Block D" from Daredevil vol. 2 #82–87 (2006).

Scardapane said the writers had a wish list of characters they wanted to include in the series based on iconic comic book storylines, and each season they were able to include any of those characters who fit into the story they were telling and Marvel Studios' wider plans for the MCU. He added that Born Again's tone was "very Frank Miller-esque" and that other Daredevil writers and artists, such as Chip Zdarsky and Brian Michael Bendis, have a "particular tone and a particular sweet spot" and some of the desired characters, such as Colleen Wing, "work in that sweet spot". Though Fisk is the "prime villain", the series features other antagonists who Scardapane said would be "piling up" as the story continues. These include serial killer Muse, whose storyline was inherited from the initial take on the series. Scardapane felt they did not do justice in resolving this storyline at the end of the first season, due to being limited by what had already been filmed and what they had time to film for the new episodes. However, he was able to expand on this in subsequent seasons, exploring how therapist Heather Glenn is impacted by Muse's actions during the second season and eventually taking on the mantle of Muse herself going into the third season.

Within the MCU, the first season is set after Echo and begins in late 2025, before jumping ahead a year to late 2026. The season continues into early 2027, showing New Year's Eve and Saint Patrick's Day celebrations. The second season begins around six months after the first, and the third season is set around a year after the second.

=== Casting ===
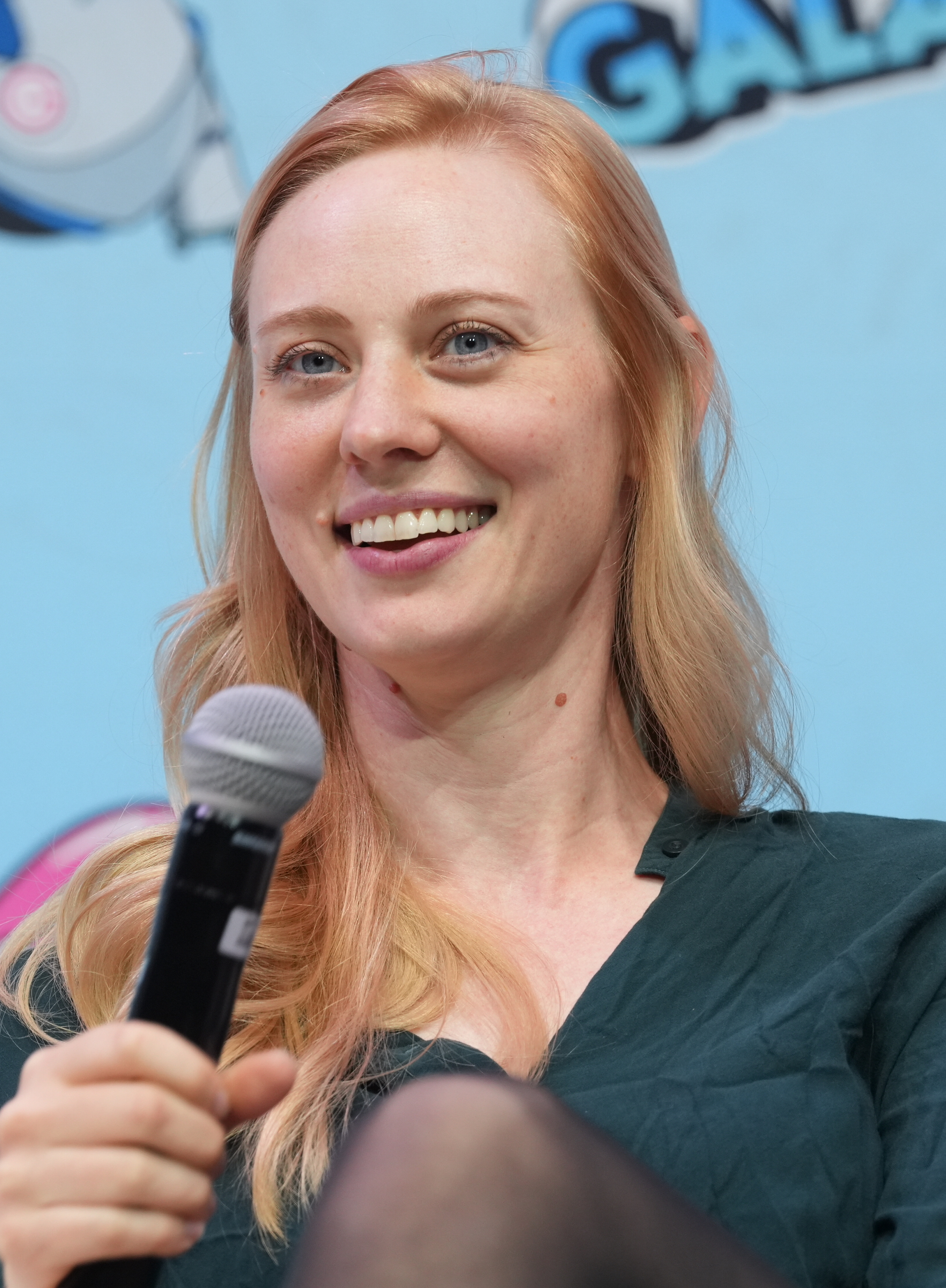
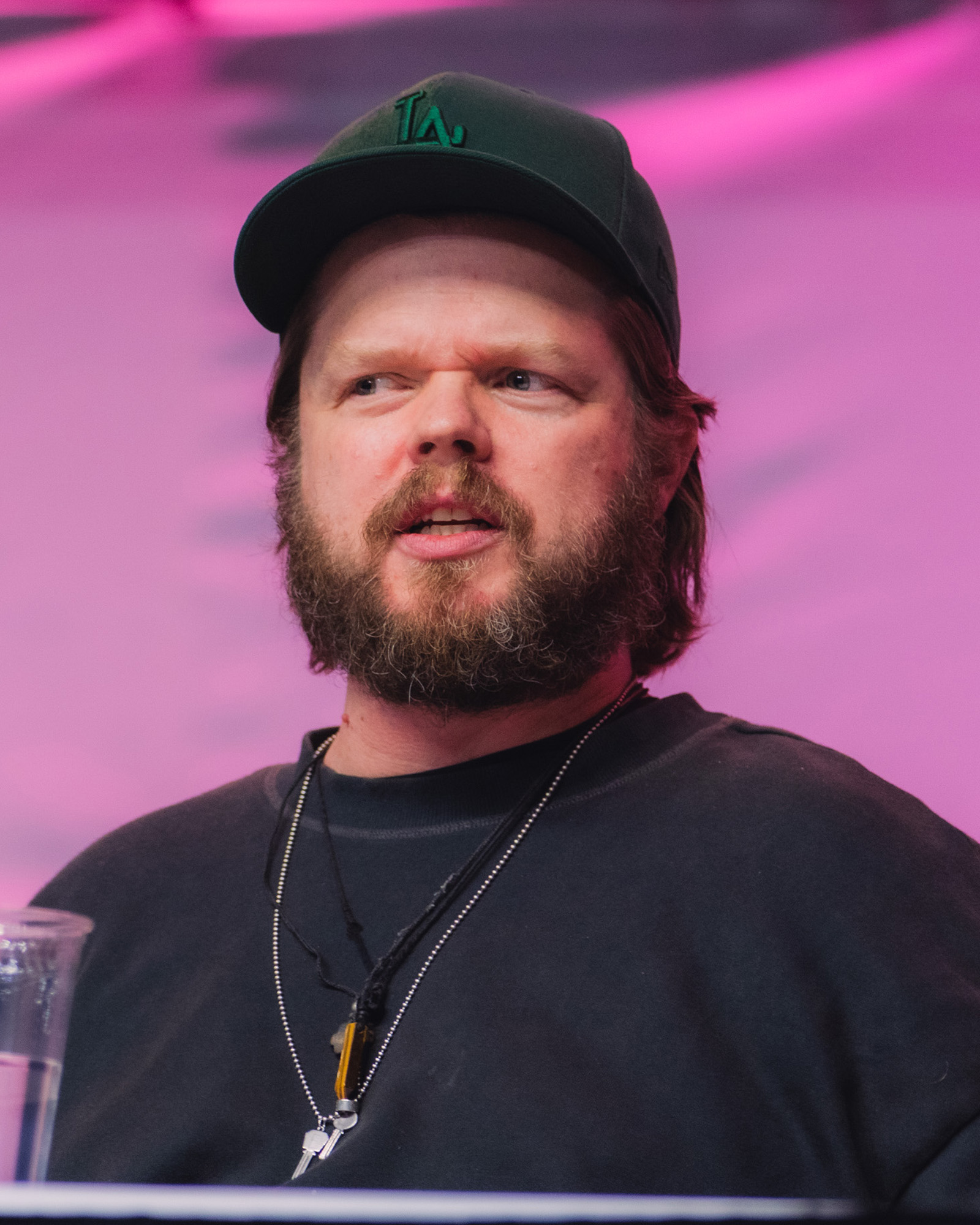
Following the series' creative overhaul, cast members from Marvel's Netflix series were brought back for Born Again including original stars Deborah Ann Woll (left) and Elden Henson (right).

Starring in the first season are Charlie Cox as Matt Murdock / Daredevil, Vincent D'Onofrio as Wilson Fisk / Kingpin, Margarita Levieva as Heather Glenn, Deborah Ann Woll as Karen Page, Elden Henson as Franklin "Foggy" Nelson, Wilson Bethel as Benjamin "Dex" Poindexter / Bullseye, Zabryna Guevara as Sheila Rivera, Nikki M. James as Kirsten McDuffie, Genneya Walton as BB Urich, Arty Froushan as Buck Cashman, Clark Johnson as Cherry, Michael Gandolfini as Daniel Blake, Ayelet Zurer as Vanessa Fisk, Kamar de los Reyes as Hector Ayala / White Tiger, Jon Bernthal as Frank Castle / Punisher, Mohan Kapur as Yusuf Khan, and Tony Dalton as Jack Duquesne / Swordsman. Before the creative overhaul, cast members from the Netflix series beyond Cox, D'Onofrio, and Bernthal were not expected to reprise their roles, and Sandrine Holt was cast to replace Zurer as Vanessa. Zurer was brought back after the overhaul, along with Woll, Henson, and Bethel.

Cox, D'Onofrio, Woll, Levieva, Dalton, Gandolfini, James, Froushan, Walton, Guevara, Johnson, Zurer, Bethel, and Henson all returned for the second season. They were joined by Matthew Lillard as Mr. Charles and Lili Taylor as Marge McCaffrey. Additionally, several actors reprised their roles from Marvel's Netflix series, including Toby Leonard Moore as James Wesley, and Krysten Ritter as Jessica Jones. Mike Colter also makes an appearance in the season finale, reprising his role as Luke Cage.

Returning for the third season are Cox, D'Onofrio, Woll, Levieva, Bethel, Froushan, Guevara, Lillard, Ritter, and Colter. Joining them for the season are Finn Jones and Élodie Yung, reprising their roles as Danny Rand / Iron Fist and Elektra Natchios, respectively, from Marvel's Netflix series.

=== Design ===
Emily Gunshor was the costume designer for the series, and Michael Shaw was the production designer. Marvel Studios' head of visual development Ryan Meinerding once again designed the Daredevil suit for Born Again, after doing so for the Netflix series. The suit in Born Again has a darker tone of red to reflect Murdock's evolution, along with black detailing and added texture, which was described as less "shiny" than the suit in the Netflix series.

=== Filming ===
Filming for the series occurs at Silvercup Studios East in Queens, with location work throughout New York. Hillary Fyfe Spera serves as cinematographer, with Pedro Gómez Millán doing so as well in the first season and Jeffrey Waldron in the second. Production on the first season was halted by the 2023 Writers Guild of America strike.

=== Visual effects ===
Gong Myung Lee is the series' visual effects supervisor, with visual effects for the first season provided by Rise FX, FOLKS, Phosphene, Powerhouse VFX, Ghost VFX, Soho VFX, Cantina Creative, Anibrain, Base FX, SDFX, and The Third Floor, Inc., and Eyeline, Storm Studios, Important Looking Pirates, Lola Visual Effects, Phosphene, Curated, Anibrain, Cantina Creative, FOLKS, EDI Effetti Digitali Italiani, Ingenuity Studios, and Wylie Co. VFX.

=== Music ===
In July 2024, the Newton Brothers were revealed to be composing music for the series. They previously composed the score for X-Men '97. The pair expressed their love for the Daredevil comics and for the main theme from the original Daredevil series, which was briefly re-used for Daredevil's appearances in She-Hulk and the Disney+ animated series Your Friendly Neighborhood Spider-Man (2025–present). The Newton Brothers' main theme for Born Again incorporates the Daredevil theme, originally composed by John Paesano and Braden Kimball. It was released as a digital single by Hollywood Records and Marvel Music on March 4, 2025.

The first season's score was released digitally in two volumes: music from the first four episodes was released on March 28, and music from the other five episodes was released on April 18. The second season score is being released digitally in two volumes: music from the first four episodes were released on April 7, and music for the other four episodes will be released later.

== Release ==
Daredevil: Born Again premiered on Disney+ on March 4, 2025, under Marvel Studios' "Marvel Television" label. The nine-episode first season is part of Phase Five of the MCU. The eight-episode second season premiered on March 24, 2026, while the eight-episode third season is set to be released in March 2027, and will be the final season of the series. Both are part of Phase Six of the MCU.

== Reception ==
=== Viewership ===
The two-episode premiere received 7.5 million views on Disney+ in its first five days, according to Disney; the company defines a view as total stream time divided by runtime. This was the biggest debut on Disney+ for 2025 at that point, and was compared to the two-episode debut of fellow MCU Disney+ series Agatha All Along (2024), which had 9.3 million views within its first seven days of streaming.

=== Critical response ===
Critical response of Daredevil: Born Again
Season	Rotten Tomatoes	Metacritic
1	87% (224 reviews)	69 (33 reviews)
2	86% (133 reviews)	73 (16 reviews)

On review aggregator Rotten Tomatoes, 87% of 224 critics gave the first season a positive review, and the average of rated reviews was 7.70 out of 10. The critics consensus reads, "Resurrecting Charlie Cox's Daredevil with his virtues intact—namely Vincent D'Onofrio as his terrifying adversary—Born Again is an ambitious and at times ungainly crime saga that marks a mature tonal shift for the MCU." Metacritic, which uses a weighted average, assigned a score of 69 out of 100 based on 33 critics, indicating "generally favorable" reviews. Critics said the season exceeded expectations and highlighted the character-driven storytelling and performances, particularly those of Cox and D'Onofrio. There were mixed feelings on how it compares to the original Daredevil series, and many critics acknowledged that the seams of the creative overhaul are visible in the season, with some comparing it to Frankenstein's monster.

For the second season, Rotten Tomatoes reported that 86% of 133 critics gave a positive review, and the average of rated reviews was 7.85 out of 10. The critics consensus reads, "Daredevil: Born Again imbues its second season with rich substance thanks to devilishly good performances, punchier narrative momentum, and well-timed themes befitting this daring crusader." Metacritic assigned a score of 73 out of 100 based on 16 critics, again indicating "generally favorable" reviews. Critics praised the season as an improvement over the first and one of the best projects from Marvel Television, highlighting the action and the performances of Cox and D'Onofrio. Following the second season's release, Caroline Siede discussed the series' connections to the Netflix series for The A.V. Club. Siede felt efforts to connect the first season to the original series following the creative overhaul were "halfhearted", but the second season improved on this by fully embracing the Netflix series, with a central role for Page and various returning major and supporting characters, along with more thematic and aesthetic ties. Siede said the series was "synthesizing its two halves into a more cohesive whole" by retaining elements of the "glossier world of Born Again" that were working and would have been out of place in the Netflix series.

=== Accolades ===
Accolades received by Daredevil: Born Again
Award	Date of ceremony	Category	Recipient	Result	Ref.
Astra TV Awards	June 10, 2025	Best Drama Series	Daredevil: Born Again	Nominated	
Astra TV Awards	June 10, 2025	Best Actor in a Drama Series	Charlie Cox	Nominated	
Astra TV Awards	June 10, 2025	Best Supporting Actor in a Drama Series	Vincent D'Onofrio	Nominated	
Black Reel TV Awards	August 18, 2025	Outstanding Editing	Stephanie Filo (for "Isle of Joy")	Won	
Critics' Choice Super Awards	August 7, 2025	Best Actor in a Superhero Series, Limited Series or Made-for-TV Movie	Charlie Cox	Nominated	
Critics' Choice Super Awards	August 7, 2025	Best Villain in a Series, Limited Series or Made-for-TV Movie	Vincent D'Onofrio	Nominated	
Critics' Choice Super Awards	August 6, 2026	Best Superhero Series, Limited Series or Made-for-TV Movie	Daredevil: Born Again	Nominated	
Critics' Choice Super Awards	August 6, 2026	Best Actress in a Superhero Series, Limited Series or Made-for-TV Movie	Deborah Ann Woll	Nominated	
MacGuffin Awards	September 12, 2026	One-Hour Contemporary Television Series	Katie Clinebelle	Pending	
Saturn Awards	March 8, 2026	Best Superhero Television Series	Daredevil: Born Again	Nominated	

== Podcast ==
For the second season, Marvel Television launched a nine-episode companion podcast, Daredevil: Born Again Official Podcast, which debuted on March 17, 2026. It features conversations with the cast, crew, and creatives, with the first episode looking back at the series so far and teasing elements of the second season. Subsequent weekly episodes of the podcast explore each episode of the second season as they were released. The Daredevil: Born Again Official Podcast was released on Disney+ and YouTube, with an audio-only version available on various podcast platforms.

== Television special ==
In February 2025, Bernthal was revealed to be reprising his role as Frank Castle / Punisher in a television special titled The Punisher: One Last Kill, a Marvel Television Special Presentation. Reinaldo Marcus Green was set to direct the special and co-write it with Bernthal. The special was conceived during filming for the first season of Born Again, and was released on Disney+ on May 12, 2026, a week after the finale of Born Again's second season. According to Scardapane, the special follows Castle following the second season of The Punisher (2019), as well as before and during the second season of Born Again. Woll also reprises her role in the special.
