= Genneya Walton =

American actress

- Born: February 22, 1999 (age 27); Southern California, U.S.
- Occupation: Actress
- Years active: 2014–present

Genneya Walton is an American actress. She is most famous for playing BB Urich in Daredevil: Born Again, and got her early start playing Bryden Bandweth in Project Mc^{2} and Chloe Barris in BlackAF.

== Early life ==
Genneya Walton was born in California. She started her career as a dancer at the age of 7.

== Career ==
In 2014, Walton made her feature film debut in the role of Renata in the direct-to-video musical An American Girl: Isabelle Dances Into the Spotlight opposite Erin Pitt, Grace Davidson and Devyn Nekoda. She appeared then in episodic roles in the television shows: Jessie, Extant, The Thundermans, Kirby Buckets, School of Rock, Criminal Minds, Adam Ruins Everything, 9-1-1 and The Resident.

From 2015 to 2017, Walton was cast to play the main role in the comedy series Project Mc^{2}.

In 2020, she was cast for a role as Chloe Barris in Netflix television series BlackAF alongside Kenya Barris and Rashida Jones.

In 2022, Walton appeared in the supernatural teen comedy film Darby and the Dead starring Riele Downs and Auliʻi Cravalho, which was released by 20th Century Studios as a Hulu original film on December 2, 2022. She was also in Never Have I Ever's final season.

In 2025, she was cast as BB Urich in the MCU series Daredevil: Born Again.

== Filmography ==
Television and film roles
Year	Film	Role	Notes
2014	An American Girl: Isabelle Dances Into the Spotlight	Renata	Direct-to-video film
2015	Jessie	Nora St. Claire	Episode: "Dance, Dance, Resolution"
2015	Extant	Teenage Tera	4 episodes
2015–2016	The Thundermans	Simone Kickbutt	Episodes: "Cape Fear", "Chutes and Splatters"
2015–2017	Project Mc^{2}	Bryden Bandweth	Main cast; 26 episodes
2016	Kirby Buckets	Birds	Episode: "Twinsies"
2016	School of Rock	Maddy Wayne	Episode: "Freddy Fights for His Right to Party"
2016	Criminal Minds	Francesca Morales	Episode: "Sick Day"
2017	Adam Ruins Everything	Winnie	Episode: "Adam Ruins Science"
2018	9-1-1	Laila Creedy	Episodes: "Next of Kin", "Worst Day Ever"
2019	The Resident	Valerie	Episode: "Emergency Contact"
2020	BlackAF	Chloe Barris	Main cast; 8 episodes
2022	Darby and the Dead	Bree	TV film
2023	Never Have I Ever	Lindsay Thompson	6 episodes
2023	Candy Cane Lane	Joy Carver	TV film
2025–present	Daredevil: Born Again	BB Urich	Main cast; 16 episodes
