= Dario Scardapane =

American television writer (born 1966)

- Born: May 20, 1966 (age 59); Seattle, Washington, U.S.
- Occupation: Television Writer

Dario Scardapane (born May 20, 1966) is an American television producer and screenwriter. He is best known for his work in two television series of the Marvel Cinematic Universe, serving as a producer and writer for The Punisher (2017–2019) and the showrunner of Daredevil: Born Again (2025–present).

== Career ==
Prior to becoming a screenwriter, Scardapane worked as a journalist in Los Angeles. In 2009, he created NBC's Trauma, starring Cliff Curtis. His other screenwriting credits include Chase, Dominion, and State of Affairs. He also worked as both a writer and consulting producer on FX's The Bridge and Amazon Prime Video's Jack Ryan, as well as a writer and executive producer on Netflix's The Punisher.

Scardapane's film work includes writing 1993's Posse, starring Mario Van Peebles, and 2022's Memory, starring Liam Neeson.

In October 2023, it was announced that Scardapane would serve as showrunner of the Disney+ show Daredevil: Born Again. He took over the position from Matt Corman and Chris Ord, following the creative overhaul of the series.
