= Under the Silver Lake (soundtrack) =

Under the Silver Lake (Original Motion Picture Soundtrack)

Film score by Disasterpeace
- Released: June 22, 2018
- Recorded: 2016–2018
- Genres: Film score; electronic; acoustic; experimental; ambience
- Length: 90:31
- Label: Milan
- Producers: Kyle Newmaster; Rich Vreeland

Disasterpeace chronology
DIY - Volume One (2018)	Under the Silver Lake (2018)	Triple Frontier (2018)

Under the Silver Lake (Original Motion Picture Soundtrack) is the film score composed by Disasterpeace to the 2018 film Under the Silver Lake directed by David Robert Mitchell starring Andrew Garfield, Riley Keough and Topher Grace. The score began production from August 2016 until the first quarter of 2018. It emphasizes various genres ranging from electro-acoustics, to experimental and ambient orchestral music. The score was released through Milan Records on June 22, 2018.

== Development ==
Rich Vreeland (also known under the stage name Disasterpeace) wrote the score for Under the Silver Lake, after previously working with Mitchell in It Follows (2014). Vreeland worked on the score during August 2016 which continued till the first quarter of 2018. The longer duration was mostly being a film noir that included lot of aesthetic elements.

Vreeland wrote for a live orchestra for the first time in his career, which he considered a learning experience along with the challenges in his way, to understand the complexity beyond the score, an instance being the music that was written during the pre-production. A lot of sequences in the film had music being played onscreen, which led to Vreeland to write music to be performed and his team working with the actors for authenticity, with the former also doing choreography, to do some synchronized gestures for the musicians to enact the live performance. A fictitious band in the film Jesus and the Brides of Dracula, featured the band members from the Silversun Pickups playing in the film.

Vreeland considered the story to be less than the characters and more about the circumstances and events take place. He recalled that a whistle theme was synonymous with the underground hobo culture and evolves into a clarinet as Sam meets on of their kind, while featuring elements which were thematically tied to the mystery-seeking behaviour, and throughlines that revolve around Sam's relationship to his mother and the neighbor. Such thematic ideas helped Vreeland to understand and comment on the multiple threads that connecting the story. Regarding the aesthetics, Mitchell referenced Citizen Kane (1941), Vertigo (1958), Taxi Driver (1976) and Blue Velvet (1986) to Vreeland so that he could get into the character's headspace; Vreeland added that discovering Bernard Herrmann's music was one of the "nicest things" about working on this film.

== Release ==
The score was initially intended to be released on June 22, 2018, the originally scheduled film's release date. But the film was delayed, though the soundtrack, released on the scheduled date through Milan Records everywhere, excluding United States, where it released digitally and physically on April 19, 2019, coinciding with the new release date.

It features Vreeland's score, along with the original song "Turning Teeth" by the fictional band Jesus and the Brides of Dracula, a cover of "To Sir With Love" by another fictional band Meek Bride and her Band, and needle drops such as "Never My Love" (1967) by the Association, "What's the Frequency, Kenneth?" (1994) and "Strange Currencies" (1995) by R.E.M. "Dependable as Sunshine" and "Dependable as Moonshine" were released as exclusive listen via IndieWire, while "Dracula's Code" was released exclusively through Flood Magazine.

== Reception ==
David Brook of Blueprint called it "an unusual but captivating soundtrack that throws in a range of influences without sounding like a mess". Laura Pierre of God Is in the TV said that "If you’re really into Jordan Peterson you’ll probably like this". Scott A. Gray of Exclaim! wrote "Regardless, at 34 tracks, there's plenty to appreciate for fans of the sort of bold compositional gymnastics the right kind of film can bring out in a brilliant musical mind." Jordan Hoffman of Thrillist described it "a rich, orchestral score composed by Disasterpeace". Ben Travis of Empire wrote "Mitchell has re-recruited It Follows composer Disasterpeace, who this time abandons thrumming electronics for ridiculously lush orchestrals that sing with golden age beauty."

Tim Grierson of Screen International wrote "The composer Disasterpiece, who provided It Follows with its menacing score, imbues Under The Silver Lake with a mixture of unease and florid beauty, hinting at both L.A.’s Hollywood glamour and its dark desperation while echoing Bernard Herrmann’s shimmering romanticism. The music proves to be the film’s heartbeat, mirroring the storytelling’s paranoid tension and bizarre reveals." Christopher Gray of Slant Magazine called it a "lush, menacing score". Pete Hammond of Deadline Hollywood wrote "Disasterpeace['s] score channels Bernard Herrmann among others". Tim Robey of The Daily Telegraph wrote "The score, by chip-tune maestro Disasterpeace, is redolent of 1950s noirs, which are clearly just a few of Mitchell’s favourite things."

Gregory Ellwood of Collider said that Disasterpiece has "(mostly) fashioned a classic Hollywood movie aesthetic with soaring orchestrations". Geoffrey Macnab of The Independent wrote "The tremendous soundtrack music (by composer Disasterpeace who also scored Mitchell’s previous feature It Follows) gives the film an atmosphere and sense of mystery it would otherwise lack." Lewis Knight of Daily Mirror wrote "A much more successful component is the hypnotic and moody soundtrack from Disasterpeace, who offer something much more obviously cinematic in tone than their work on It Follows." David Rooney of The Hollywood Reporter stated that "the score by Richard Vreeland, aka Disasterpeace, stirs up high drama in the lush symphonic mode of Franz Waxman or Bernard Hermann". Sonny Bunch of The Washington Post called it an "haunting, nigh-on oppressive score by Disasterpeace".

== Track listing ==
No.	Title	Artist(s)	Length
1.	"The Curse of Edendale"		2:01
2.	"Unknowable Things"		1:38
3.	"A Junction"		1:16
4.	"Dependable as Sunshine"		1:15
5.	"Dependable as Moonshine"		3:35
6.	"The Reverse Trojan"		5:26
7.	"Turning Teeth"	Jesus and the Brides of Dracula	4:37
8.	"Welcome to Purgatory"		1:46
9.	"Silhouette"		1:09
10.	"A Beautiful Spectre, A Pattern of Glances"		3:30
11.	"Beware the Dog Killer"		1:32
12.	"The Cult of the Whale, & Other Tales"		5:35
13.	"Shadows"		3:10
14.	"The Accomplice"		0:31
15.	"To Sir With Love"	Meek Bride and Her Band	3:43
16.	"What's the Frequency, Kenneth?"	R.E.M.	3:58
17.	"Seventy-Six"		0:48
18.	"A Birdwatcher"		1:43
19.	"An Escort"		2:01
20.	"Dracula's Code"		2:53
21.	"An Excursion in Griffith Park"		4:16
22.	"Through the Looking-Tubes"		2:54
23.	"Dead Carrier of Dreams"		1:36
24.	"The Owl's Kiss"		1:11
25.	"A Blessed Creature"		1:56
26.	"Floating on the Periphery"		2:41
27.	"The Centerfold"		1:19
28.	"Jefferson's Legend"		4:08
29.	"How to Bury a Billionaire"		3:59
30.	"The White Rabbit / Make the Best of It"		3:30
31.	"Hills of Gold"		2:40
32.	"Never My Love"	The Association	3:10
33.	"Inconclusion"		1:12
34.	"Strange Currencies"	R.E.M.	3:52
Total length:			90:31

== Personnel ==
Credits adapted from liner notes:

- Music composer – Disasterpeace
- Music producer – Kyle Newmaster, Rich Vreeland
- Recording – Michael Aarvold
- Recordist – Milton Gutierrez
- Mixing – Damon Tedesco
- Musical assistance – Barmey Ung
- Production manager – Pablo Manyer
- Executive producer – JC Chamboredon, Stefan Karrer
- Music preparation – Black Ribbon Pro
- Music librarian – Matt Franko
- Cover design – Rich Vreeland
- Illustration – Milo Neuman

Orchestra

- Lead orchestrator – Kyle Newmaster
- Additional orchestration – Carl Rydlund, Neal Desby, Vincent Oppido
- Conductor – Neal Desby
- Contractor – Mark Robertson

Instruments

- Bass – Mike Valerio, Steve Pfeifer, Tom Harte
- Bassoon – Anthony Parnther, Damian Montano, Jon Stehney
- Cello – Chris Ahn, David Mergen, Ginger Murphy, Jason Lippman, Julie Jung, Leah Metzler, Vanessa Freebairn-Smith, Victor Lawrence
- Clarinet – Chris Stoutenborough, Phil O'Connor, Rory Mazzella
- Flute – Amy Tatum, Gina Luciani, Jenni Olson, Sara Andon
- French horn – Dylan Hart, Katie Faraudo, Laura Brenes, Teag Reaves
- Guitar – Mateo Lugo
- Harp – Alison Bjorkedal
- Oboe – Christine Warren, Lara Wickes
- Percussion – MB Gordy
- Trombone – Al Kaplan, Craig Gosnell, Noah Gladstone
- Trumpet – Adam Bhatia, Erick Jovel, Kristofer Bergh, Kyle Newmaster, Rob Schaer
- Tuba – Blake Cooper
- Viola – Andrew Duckles, Brett Banducci, Briana Brady, Corinne Sobolewski, Darrin Mccann, Matt Funes, Rodney Wirtz, Tim Richardson
- Violin – Anna Kostyuchek, Ashoka Thiagarajan, Ben Jacobson, Carol Pool, Charlie Bisharat, Cheryl Kim, Daphne Chen, Elizabeth Bacher, Ellen Jung, Eun-mee Ahn, Jean Kim, Josefina Vergara, Katie Sloan, Lisa Dondlinger, Lucia Micarelli, Marisa Sorajja, Marisa Kuney, Mark Robertson, Neel Hammond, Sam Fischer, Songa Lee

== Accolades ==
Award	Date of ceremony	Category	Recipient(s)	Result
World Soundtrack Awards	October 18, 2019	Discovery of the Year	Disasterpeace	Nominated
