= It Follows (soundtrack) =

It Follows (Original Motion Picture Soundtrack)

Film score by Disasterpeace
- Released: March 10, 2015
- Recorded: 2014–2015
- Genre: Film score
- Length: 44:44
- Label: Milan
- Producer: Richard Glasser

Disasterpeace chronology
Cannon Brawl (2014)	It Follows (2015)	Loop Ring Chop Drink (2015)

It Follows (Original Motion Picture Soundtrack) is the film score to the 2015 film It Follows directed by David Robert Mitchell. The original score for It Follows was composed by Rich Vreeland, known as Disasterpeace, in his debut feature film. Vreeland was involved in the project after Mitchell temped some of his music from Fez. The score was written in a tight deadline of three weeks as the film was about to be premiered at the 2014 Cannes Film Festival on May 17.

The album was produced by Richard Glasser and published via Milan Records which released the album digitally on March 10, 2015, followed by physical CD and LP releases on March 31 and April 21, respectively. The album received positive reviews with praise directed on Vreeland's composition and the influence of classical horror scores blending with electronic and synth music. It has been regarded as one of the best horror film scores.

== Development ==
Rich Vreeland, known under the stage name Disasterpeace, composed the score for It Follows in his maiden feature film. Mitchell used some of the music from Vreeland's Fez, along with the likes of John Cage, John Carpenter and Krzysztof Penderecki's music as temp tracks. Having liked Vreeland's work for the game, he sent a copy on the script to the composer who felt it anticlimatic and struck to him as an odd film, and was initially skeptical, until he watched Mitchell's debut film The Myth of the American Sleepover (2011) and had got the sense for treating the characters to be natural and believable, which would be the similar approach for It Follows, by including naturalistic characters into a horror film.

Vreeland had decided to go ahead with making synth music, owing to his expertise in video games, and despite the horror genre, he found the requirements of what music needs, thereby creating dissonant, wild and experimental sounds, with Mitchell providing complete freedom. Despite Vreeland's early involvement, he had to complete the score within three weeks as it had to be premiered at the 2014 Cannes Film Festival which he considered challenging. However, the inclusion of the temp tracks, including his own score for Fez, provided him the reference points. The opening scene for the film was the first cue he had scored, which had set a higher bar in terms of intensity and the ending had "to be crazy" to match that level. The score utilized a range of melodic and abrasive sounds, to synthesizer arpeggios colliding with electronic drums in the ending, thereby providing a multitude of emotional tension musically, and the least traditional horror score featured for a horror film.

== Release ==
It Follows soundtrack was published by Milan Records. Three tracks from the album—"Title", "Lakeward" and "Linger"—preceded as exclusive singles from the album via IndieWire on February 25, 2015. The album, released digitally on March 10, in CDs on March 31, and in LPs on April 21. On October 17, 2025, Vreeland re-issued a deluxe edition of the album, featuring 16 additional tracks that included alternatives and outtakes, and special cues that were not included in the original album.

== Reception ==
Jeremy Gordon of Pitchfork wrote: "It's a score that announces when something is about to happen, only to suddenly upend expectations and leave the room on edge." Jocelyn Clark of The Irish Times wrote: "The boldly aleatory combination of brooding suspense and heart-stopping scares makes It Follows a masterpiece of both musical technique and dramatic storytelling – and one of the most remarkable scores of the year yet." Pat Levy of Consequence wrote: "Vreeland has crafted a horror score that should live on for years to come. It may not have an instantly iconic riff like the musical cues to Jaws or Psycho, but it sure comes close." Heather Phares of AllMusic wrote: "Vreeland's reverence for horror music tradition never gets in the way of making his own mark, however, and It Follows is a self-assured and—most importantly—truly unsettling debut as a film composer."

Sean Wilson of Mfiles wrote: "For a debut film score, It Follows is very impressive – even if a stand-alone listening experience might have the listener reaching for a stiff drink." The Film Scorer summarized "It may seem simple, but many scores do not amplify the film's emotional heft. In doing so, Disasterpeace stands apart and elevates the weight of the film's horror."

== Impact ==
Tom Philip of GQ described it as "one of the best film scores to listen while you work", adding that "It Follows is a breathlessly paranoid horror, and the music speaks to that throughout" and the composer "takes cues from '80s horror and his chiptune roots to make something unique, thrilling, and in parts thrilling in itself." Terence Hannum of Bandcamp listed it as one of the best horror soundtracks, adding "Disasterpeace updates classic Carpenter/Howarth synth madness, combining that sound with moments bolstered by creepy atmospheres and icy arpeggios."

Collider and The Vinyl Factory also ranked it as one of the best horror soundtracks, with Dazed and Polygon also ranking it as one of the best film scores of 2015. New Noise Magazine ranked at nine on the top 50 albums of 2015. Stereogum also ranked it as one of the best horror scores of the 2010s. Vice listed it as one of the best electronic horror soundtracks of all time, with Ian Stanley saying, "It Follows‘ retro-minded synth score mirrors its uncanny ability to recall the horror genre's past in a way that feels fresh and updated—not to mention terrifying." The film also prompted Rich Vreeland to attain breakthrough, and eventually he composed for films such as Under the Silver Lake (2018), Triple Frontier (2019), Marcel the Shell with Shoes On (2021) and Bodies Bodies Bodies (2022).

== Track listing ==
It Follows — standard edition
No.	Title	Length
1.	"Heels"	2:47
2.	"Title"	2:17
3.	"Jay"	1:28
4.	"Anyone"	1:48
5.	"Old Maid"	2:32
6.	"Company"	4:12
7.	"Detroit"	1:20
8.	"Detritus"	2:18
9.	"Playpen"	1:28
10.	"Inquiry"	2:20
11.	"Lakeward"	1:34
12.	"Doppel"	5:25
13.	"Relay"	1:52
14.	"Greg"	3:28
15.	"Snare"	0:59
16.	"Pool"	1:35
17.	"Father"	5:01
18.	"Linger"	2:20
Total length:		44:44

It Follows — deluxe re-issue
No.	Title	Length
1.	"Heels"	2:47
2.	"Title"	2:17
3.	"Jay"	1:28
4.	"Anyone"	1:48
5.	"Old Maid"	2:32
6.	"Company"	4:12
7.	"Detroit"	1:20
8.	"Detritus"	2:18
9.	"Playpen"	1:28
10.	"Inquiry"	2:20
11.	"Lakeward"	1:34
12.	"Doppel"	5:25
13.	"Relay"	1:52
14.	"Greg"	3:28
15.	"Snare"	0:59
16.	"Pool"	1:35
17.	"Father"	5:01
18.	"Linger"	2:20
19.	"The Mirror"	5:04
20.	"Title" (Nate Zonnevylle Remix)	4:49
21.	"Pool" (Extended)	6:59
22.	"Jay" (Alternate)	2:28
23.	"Detroit" (Origins No. 2)	1:52
24.	"Title" (Origins)	2:44
25.	"Playpen" (Origins)	2:19
26.	"Weapons of Velvet" (Dan Cantrell)	4:07
27.	"Sick"	2:16
28.	"Grab Bag"	2:37
29.	"The Attic"	3:09
30.	"Inquiry" (Origins)	1:18
31.	"Detroit" (Origins No. 1)	4:06
32.	"Detroit" (Alternate + Super Hoop VRC6 Demake)	2:22
33.	"Title" (From Disasters for Piano) (Disasterpeace and David Peacock)	2:14
34.	"Clamshell"	2:14
Total length:		95:22

== Accolades ==
Award	Category	Result	Ref.
Austin Film Critics Association	Best Original Score	Nominated	
Chicago Film Critics Association	Best Original Score	Nominated	
Fangoria Chainsaw Awards	Best Score	Won	
IndieWire Critics Poll	Best Original Score or Soundtrack	4th place	
International Cinephile Society	Best Original Score	2nd place	
St. Louis Film Critics Association	Best Score	Nominated	
