= Disasterpeace =

American musician

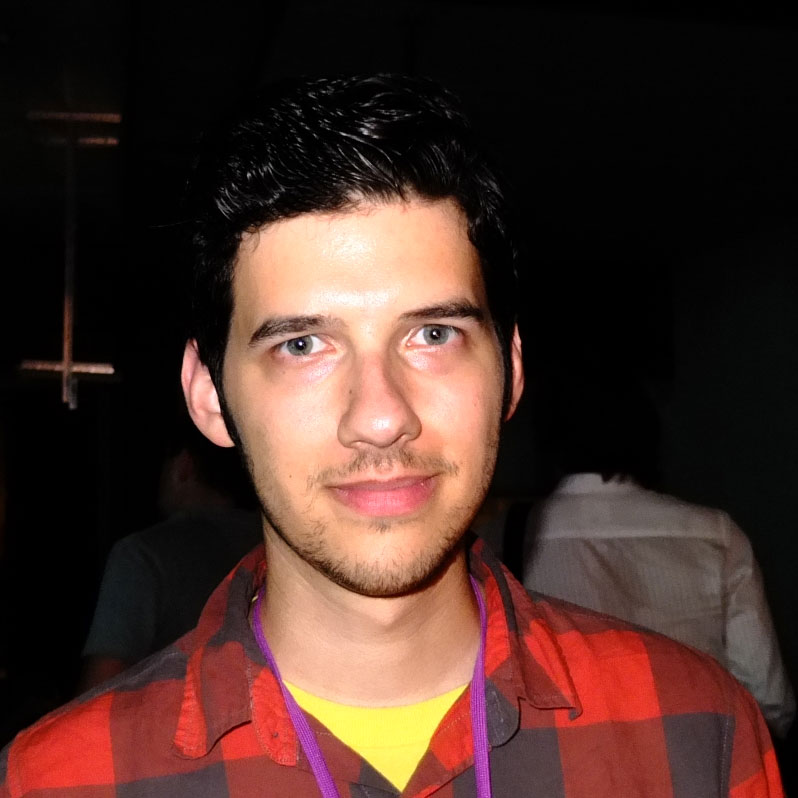
- Vreeland in 2012

Background information
- Born: Richard Vreeland; Staten Island, New York, United States
- Genres: Chiptune; electronic; ambient; experimental rock
- Occupations: Musician; composer
- Years active: 2004–present
- Website: disasterpeace.com

Richard Vreeland, better known by his stage name Disasterpeace, is an American composer and musician. He first got started in music after learning the guitar in high school and began writing music around the age of 17. Known for his work as a chiptune artist, Vreeland has scored numerous video games, including Fez and Hyper Light Drifter. He stepped into film score composition with the 2015 film It Follows, and has since composed the scores for Marcel the Shell with Shoes On, Under the Silver Lake, Triple Frontier, and Bodies Bodies Bodies.

== Early life ==
Vreeland's first introduction to music was as a child, growing up in Staten Island. He spent a great deal of time learning from his step-father, who was a trained musician. In an interview, Vreeland stated, "As a child, I was mesmerized by drums. My step-father was the music director of our church and they would have band practice in the basement. Many of my fondest memories are of going down there to jam away on the drums, when they were there".

== Career ==
=== Fez ===
"Trail", a medley by Disasterpeace from the Fez soundtrack remix album FZ: Side Z

Vreeland composed the video game Fez's chiptune-like electronic soundtrack. Despite his background in chiptune, Vreeland limited his use of that genre's mannerisms in the score. He worked with soft synth pads and reverb to push the score closer to a 1980s synthesizer sound. He also reduced reliance on percussion and incorporated distortion techniques like bitcrushing and wow. Vreeland opted for slower passages with varying tempos that could "ebb, flow, and breathe with the player". He left some portions of Fez without music. Vreeland worked on its soundtrack at night for roughly 14 months while scoring Shoot Many Robots, and Brandon McCartin of Aquaria contributed the sound effects.

=== It Follows ===
In 2014, Vreeland produced the soundtrack for David Robert Mitchell's sophomore film It Follows, after being approached by Mitchell, a fan of Vreeland's work on the video game Fez.

=== Hyper Light Drifter ===
Disasterpeace composed the soundtrack for Hyper Light Drifter, a game developed by Heart Machine in 2016. The score follows Disasterpeace's previous soundtrack work and was listed as "One of the year's best scores, in any medium" by FACT.

== Discography ==
=== Studio albums ===
Year	Title
2004	History of the Vreeland
2005	The Chronicles of Jammage the Jam Mage
2006	Atebite and the Warring Nations
2007	Under the Influence
2007	Level
2007	Neutralite
2011	Rise of the Obsidian Interstellar

=== EPs ===
Year	Title	Notes
2006	Cereal Code	N/A
2010	West	N/A
2016	Mud Water	Theatre

=== Compilations ===
Year	Title	Notes
2006	Daniel, Matthew & Richard	Improvisational album
2007	Noon Kids	B-sides
2010	Midnight Orphans	B-sides
2011	Deorbit	B-sides
2013	Strays	B-sides
2016	Singles	N/A
2017	Video Games	N/A
2017	Disasters for Piano	Arrangement album

=== Soundtracks ===
Year	Title	Type
2007	Limeade Grin	Unreleased video game
2008	Rescue: The Beagles	Video game
2009	Drawn To Life: The Next Chapter (UST)	Video game
2009	Woosh	Video game
2009	Waker	Video game
2009	High Strangeness	Video game
2009	Bomberman Live: Battlefest (UST)	Video game
2009	Bright-Coves	Brightcove video platform
2010	Astral Puzzle Meltdown	Video game
2010	Bonk: Brink Of Extinction (UST)	Unreleased video game
2010	Passcode: Soul Of The Traveler	Web-series
2010	Cat Astro Phi	Video game
2011	360° Sharks	Video game
2011	Puzzle Agent (UST)	Video game
2011	ZONR	Video game
2012	Fez	Video game
2012	Shoot Many Robots	Video game
2012	KRUNCH	Video game
2013	Runner2 (UST)	Video game
2013	FZ: Side F	Fez OST remix album
2013	FZ: Side Z	Fez OST remix album
2013	Apoc Wars	Video game
2013	Soundodger+	Video game
2013	Somewhere	Short film
2014	The Floor Is Jelly	Video game
2014	Famaze	Video game
2014	Monsters Ate My Birthday Cake	Video game
2014	Cannon Brawl	Video game
2015	It Follows	Film
2015	Loop Ring Chop Drink	Short film
2015	Gunhouse	Video game
2015	Mini Metro	Video game
2016	"Bad Jubies"	Adventure Time episode
2016	Hyper Light Drifter	Video game
2016	Reigns (UST)	Video game
2016	Beasts of Balance	Tabletop game
2017	Ram Son (original soundtrack for River City Ransom: Underground)	Video game
2018	DIY - Volume One	TV cartoon
2018	Under the Silver Lake	Film
2019	Triple Frontier	Film
2019	Crimson Tooth	Video game
2021	Solar Ash	Video game
2021	Marcel the Shell with Shoes On	Film
2022	Bodies Bodies Bodies	Film
2022	Hyper Light Fragments	Hyper Light Drifter OST additional tracks
2022	Paradise Marsh	Video game
2023	Soundodger 2	Video game
2024	Viktor	Film
2025	Teenage Mutant Ninja Turtles: Chrome Alone 2 – Lost in New Jersey	Short film
2026	Neverway	Video game
