= Marcel the Shell with Shoes On =

Marcel the Shell with Shoes On may refer to:

- Marcel the Shell with Shoes On (short film series), an animated short film series
- Marcel the Shell with Shoes On (2021 film), a live-action/animated feature film
- Marcel the Shell with Shoes On (soundtrack), a score album by Disasterpeace and the soundtrack album of the 2021 film
