= Neverway =

Upcoming video game

- Developer: Coldblood Inc.
- Publishers: Coldblood Inc.; Outersloth
- Programmer: Isadora Sophia
- Artist: Pedro Medeiros
- Composer: Disasterpeace
- Platforms: Linux; macOS; Nintendo Switch; Windows
- Release: 2027
- Genres: Role-playing, horror, life simulation
- Mode: Single-player

Neverway is an upcoming horror role-playing video game developed and published by Coldblood Inc. and funded by Outersloth. In it, the playable-character Fiona quits her dead-end job and moves to an island, but subsequently becomes indebted to a dead god, becoming its immortal herald. It was announced by Coldblood Inc. as its debut game, containing music from Disasterpeace and pixel art from Pedro Medeiros. It is planned to be released in 2027.

== Gameplay ==
Neverway is a life simulation role-playing game set on a remote island the player character Fiona moved to after quitting her dead-end job. On the island, Fiona engages in activities while also interacting with other characters, though in the area known as Neverway, Fiona has combat interactions with enemies as she attempts to repay a debt she owes to a dead god.

Combat in Neverway features Zelda-like 2D fighting mechanics, with crafting mechanics for tools such as a hookshot, that which compliments Fiona's sword. New combat abilities can be gained by forming bonds with other characters. Outside of the titular Neverway, the player takes up activities such as such as farming, fishing, crafting, building, managing payments, and interacting with other characters, though while using an abnormal time system where time only passes after the player chooses to do certain activities.

== Premise ==
A nightmarish realm known as Neverway is also leaking into reality. After quitting her dead-end job, Fiona moves to a small island where she plans to start her new life farming. On this island, she interacts with various different characters as she engages in various activities and manages her mortgage payments. However, Fiona becomes indebted to a dead god, and consequently becomes its immortal herald.

== Development ==
After the Vancouver, Canada-based development company Coldblood Inc. was founded, they announced that their debut game would be Neverway, its development being funded by Outersloth. Coldblood Inc. was co-founded by Pedro Medeiros, the former pixel artist of Celeste, and computer programmer Isadora Sophia. The game additionally includes music from Disasterpeace, the composer behind It Follows and Fez. The game was announced to be available on Windows, macOS, Linux, and Switch. The game was originally planned to be released in October 2026, but in August of that year, it was announced that the game got delayed to 2027.
