= Triple Frontier (soundtrack) =

2019 film soundtrack album

Triple Frontier (Original Music from the Netflix Film)

Film score by Disasterpeace
- Released: March 8, 2019
- Recorded: 2018–2019
- Studios: Capitol Studios, Hollywood, California
- Genre: Film score
- Length: 59:03
- Label: Milan
- Producers: Kyle Newmaster; Rich Vreeland

Disasterpeace chronology
Under the Silver Lake (2018)	Triple Frontier (2019)	Crimson Tooth (2019)

Triple Frontier (Original Music from the Netflix Film) is the film score to the 2019 film Triple Frontier directed by J. C. Chandor starring Ben Affleck, Oscar Isaac, Charlie Hunnam, Garrett Hedlund and Pedro Pascal. The original score is composed by Disasterpeace, who co-produced the score with Kyle Newmaster. The album was released through Milan Records on March 8, 2019.

== Development ==
Rich Vreeland, known under the stage name Disasterpeace, composed the music for Triple Frontier. Ron Patane who edited the film was a fan of Disasterpeace's music, and had temped some of his music in the edit which he showcased it to J. C. Chandor, who was looking for a composer at that time. As his music felt apt for the film, they considered him to be a good fit for the project, which Vreeland was intrigued upon their request. In their earlier conversations, Vreeland discussed about using electric guitars in an orchestral way with more snare drums, toms, active rhythms and syncopation. Through the process, Vreeland refined the direction and incorporated more orchestra into the sound, such as brass, and multiple kinds of string textures, both traditional and unusual way, which worked well as it provided a sense of an optimism in the dark times and provided room for their characters to understand them emotionally and psychologically.

Guitars were considered essential for the score of Triple Frontier. For the thematic guitars, Vreeland sampled guitar sounds and blended it with DI guitar and modelling and various effects. Vreeland considered the Ennio Morricone influence to be natural, while doing a reverberant guitar melody to provide this feel, and also had a country-style guitar sound which he found having the right attitude for the film. The score had an ambient nature which relied on utilizing a diverse palette of string textures, sampling and recording several extended techniques as well as developing software approaches to make the sounds more diverse, playing with pitch and modulating with unorthodoxed textures.

Lars Ulrich of the Metallica provided the drums, kicks and toms for the score. Chandor, who has been a fan of the band, had met Ulrich in late 2018 to provide an unconventional drums sound that suited the narrative. Ulrich had contributed around 10–20 percent of the drums featured in the film, matching Vreeland's active and syncopated percussive sounds as a great counterpart. Vreeland added that Ulrich's low end sounds had glued some of the cues together making the score accessible. Vreeland went to the headquarters of Metallica in Los Angeles and recorded the drums within few days. The orchestral recording happened at the Capitol Studios in Hollywood. Vreeland revealed that much of the music was written even before watching the film so that the director and editor could assemble the score and edit the film, and much of the discussions happened remotely owing to the shooting locations. Some themes which he wrote for a part of the film ended up in another sequences while a few stayed intact to that scene.

== Release ==
The soundtrack was released through Milan Records on March 8, 2019. A vinyl edition of the album was self-released by Vreeland in May 10, 2019.

== Reception ==
Alex Hudson of Exclaim! wrote "Special credit goes to composer Disasterpeace, whom audiences may remember from the It Follows score. His eerie tones and sinister build-ups give the film a moodier tone than your average shoot-'em-up, and are a lovely complement for the gorgeous rainforests and spectacular Andean vistas." Jack Pooley of WhatCulture felt that "though the incidental musical score from Disasterpeace is rock solid" it was mellowed down by few odd choices of incidental music which led the film to be out of place. Dusty Wilson of The Spool wrote "the music was the one place where there was the most potential for subversion of expectations, as Disasterpeace (It Follows) was behind the design of the original score. His previous scores have shown a great skill at subtlety and unique choices of tone, but all of that is forsaken for what amounts to a very archetypal war-movie score. Not only that, but his services were used so rarely that pure silence more than likely has more screen time than his original works."

== Track listing ==
No.	Title	Length
1.	"America Is Listening"	1:32
2.	"A Mole and a Mercenary"	2:42
3.	"Once a Soldier"	2:48
4.	"Recce"	4:28
5.	"Full on Cowboy"	2:32
6.	"Desecrated Oaths"	7:05
7.	"The House Is the Safe"	5:26
8.	"Count Your Kills"	5:38
9.	"Into the Wind"	5:35
10.	"With the Devil Now"	2:52
11.	"Check Six"	2:02
12.	"What Gold Does"	3:11
13.	"A Debt"	5:09
14.	"Rendez Vous"	6:14
15.	"Coordinates"	1:49
Total length:		59:03

== Additional music ==
The following songs are featured in the film, but not included in the soundtrack:

- "For Whom the Bell Tolls" – Metallica
- "Caderas" – Bomba Estéreo
- "The Chain" – Fleetwood Mac
- "Walk" – Pantera
- "Masters of War" – Bob Dylan
- "Run Through the Jungle" – Creedence Clearwater Revival
- "Para Elisa" – Los Destellos
- "Linda Munequita" – Los Hijos Del Sol
- "Mi Lamento" – Grupo Celeste
- "No Te Dejare" – Grupo Celeste
- "Somewhere There Is A Mother" – traditional song
- "Woah" – Jeremie Salvatore
- "Old Time Pan" – Odyssey Steel Band
- "Orion" – Metallica

== Personnel ==
Credits adapted from liner notes:

- Music composer – Disasterpeace
- Music producer – Kyle Newmaster, Rich Vreeland
- Recording – Damon Tedesco, Matthew Powell
- Mixing – Damon Tedesco
- Music payroll – Sabron, Inc.
- Production manager – Pablo Manyer
- Copyist – Black Ribbon Pro
- Music librarian – Matt Franko
- Musical assistance – Vincent Steenstra Toussaint
- Executive producer – JC Chamboredon, Stefan Karrer

Orchestra

- Supervising orchestrator – Kyle Newmaster
- Orchestrators – Carl Rydlund, Jeff Atmajian, Neal Desby
- Conductor – Neal Desby
- Contractor – Mark Robertson

Instruments

- Bass – Bart Samolis, Ian Walker, Steve Pfeifer, Tom Harte
- Cello – Alisha Bauer, Chris Ahn, David Mergen, Ginger Murphy, Hillary Smith, Jason Lippman, Jonathan Karoly, Judy Kang, Leif Woodward, Mia Barcia-Colombo, Victor Lawrence
- Drums – Lars Ulrich
- French horn – Dylan Hart, Katie Faraudo, Laura Brenes, Teag Reaves
- Guitar – Carl Rydlund, Daniel de Lara, Rich Vreeland
- Solo cello – David Low
- Trombone – James Miller, Nick Daley, Noah Gladstone
- Tuba – Blake Cooper
- Viola – Andrew Duckles, Briana Bandy, Leah Katz, Linnea Powell, Luke Maurier, Lynne Richburg, Rodney Wirtz
- Violin – Alyssa Park, Ashoka Thiagarajan, Daphne Chen, Darius Campo, Marisa Sorajja, Mark Robertson, Nathan Cole, Neli Nikolaeva, Peter Kent, Sam Fischer, Steve Zander, Yu-Tong Sharp
