= Silver Lake Reservoir =

Water supply reservoirs for Los Angeles

Silver Lake Reservoir Complex
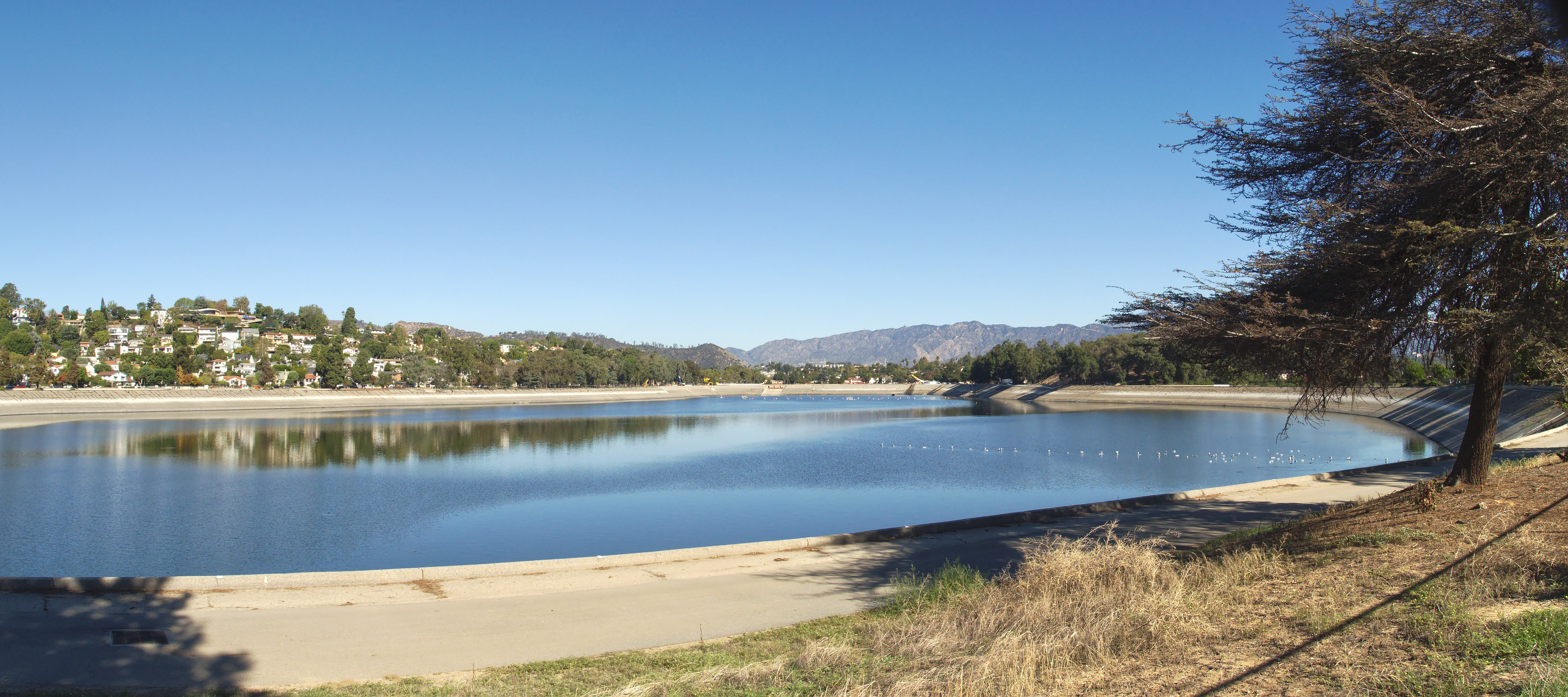
- View to the northwest across lower reservoir

- Location within the Los Angeles metropolitan area Location within California Location within the United States
- Location: Silver Lake, Los Angeles, California
- Coordinates: 34°06′04″N 118°15′54″W
- Type: Reservoir
- Basin countries: United States
- Max. length: 1.2 km (0.75 mi)
- Max. width: 500 m (1,600 ft)
- Surface area: 39 hectares (96 acres)
- Water volume: 3,000,000 m^{3} (2,400 acre⋅ft)
- Shore length^{1}: 3.2 km (2.0 mi)
- Surface elevation: 433 ft (132 m)
- References: U.S. Geological Survey Geographic Names Information System: Silver Lake Reservoir
- ^{1} Shore length is not a well-defined measure.

The Silver Lake Reservoir Complex comprises two concrete-lined basins, Ivanhoe Reservoir and Silver Lake, divided by a spillway, in the Silver Lake community of Los Angeles, California.

== History ==
The lower body of water was named in 1906 for Water Board Commissioner Herman Silver, and in turn lends its name to the neighborhood. The upper body received its name after the 1819 Sir Walter Scott novel Ivanhoe.

The reservoirs are owned and maintained by the Los Angeles Department of Water and Power (DWP), and could provide water to 600,000 homes in downtown and South Los Angeles;. Only the smaller of the two, Ivanhoe, remains online. At capacity, it holds 795 million US gallons (3,010,000 m^{3}) of water. The Silver Lake Reservoir's water resources was planned to be replaced by the Headworks Reservoir, an underground reservoir north of Griffith Park, slated for completion by December 2017.

The reservoir is the focal point of the community and has evolved as a regional recreational resource. It is surrounded by several recreational areas, including a dog park on the south, a nursery school on the north, and the Silver Lake Recreation Center, which includes a basketball court on the south side of the lake. There is also a walking and jogging path, which stretches 2.2 miles (3.5 km) around the reservoir. In April 2011, the City of Los Angeles opened up for public use a three-acre passive park on the east side of the lake dubbed the "Silver Lake Meadow," modeled after the Sheep Meadow in New York's Central Park.

In January 2022, investigative journalists Christo Grozev and Maria Pevchikh came up with a plan that they called Secret Project Silver Lake, while walking around the reservoir. It was to organize an exchange of Russian spies held in Western prisons for several Russian political prisoners. A little more than two years later in August 2024, 16 individuals, many activists, journalists and political dissidents, were released from Russian prisons, including journalist Evan Gershkovich.

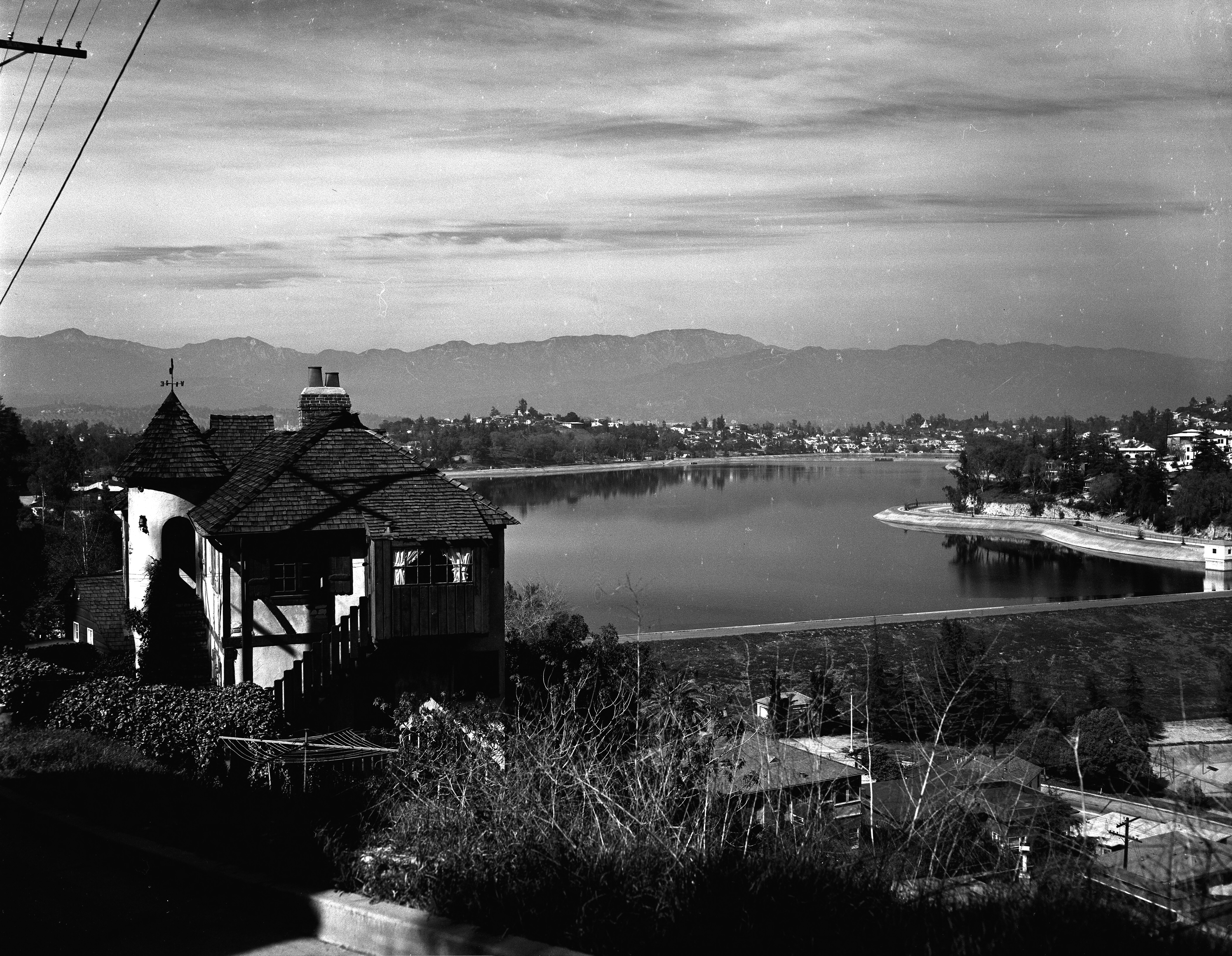
Silver Lake Reservoir in February 1956

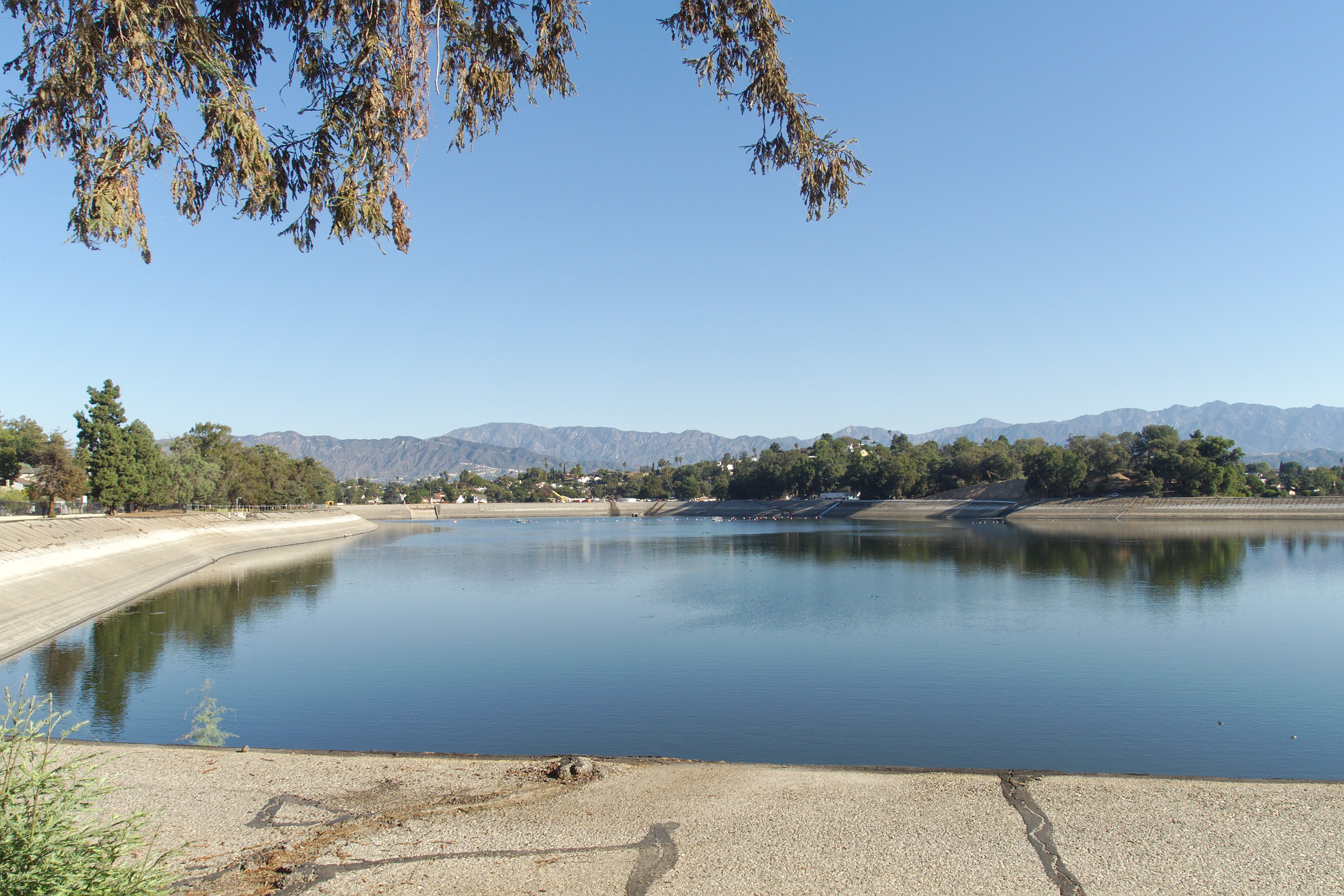
Looking north

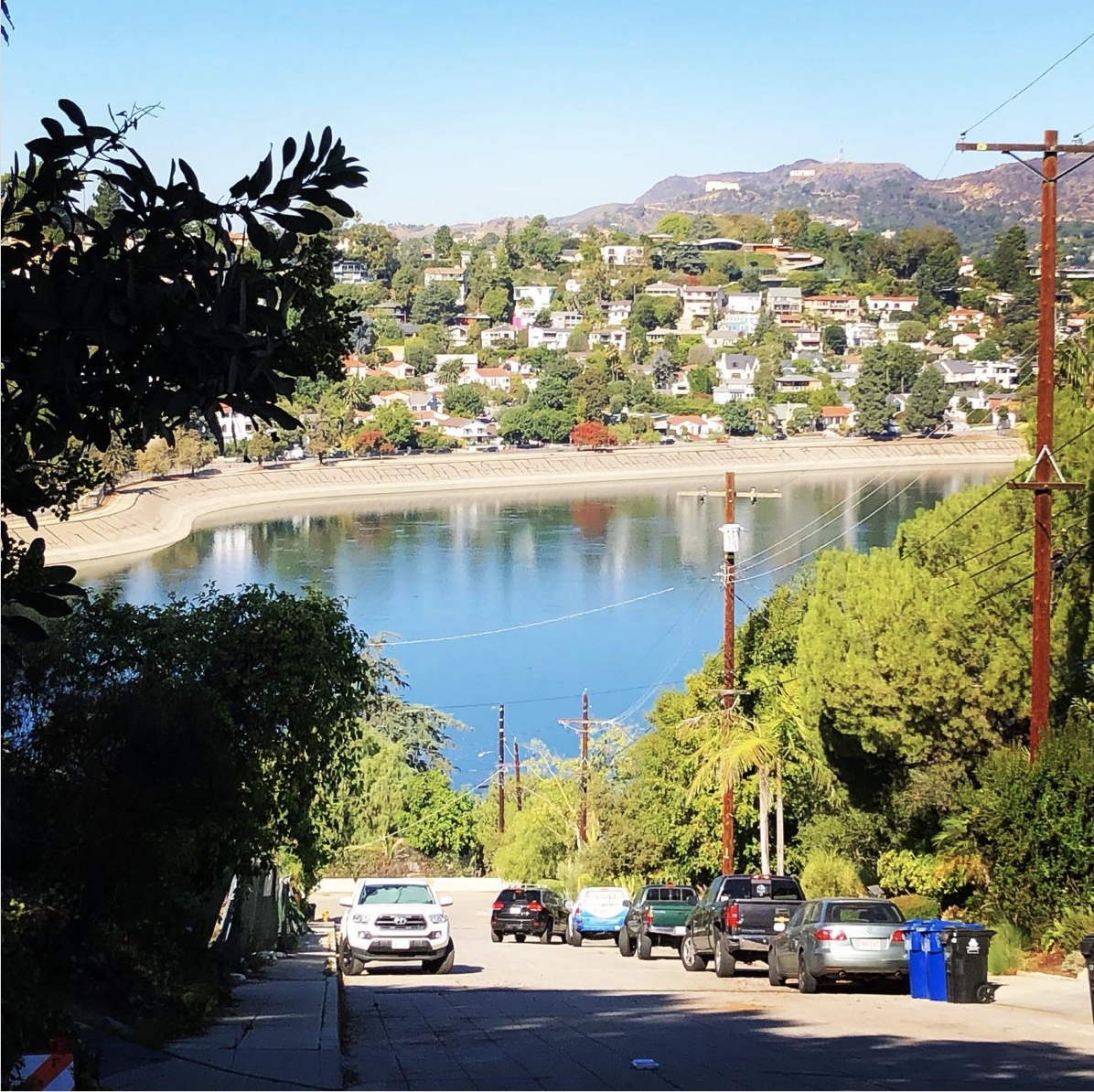
Looking west

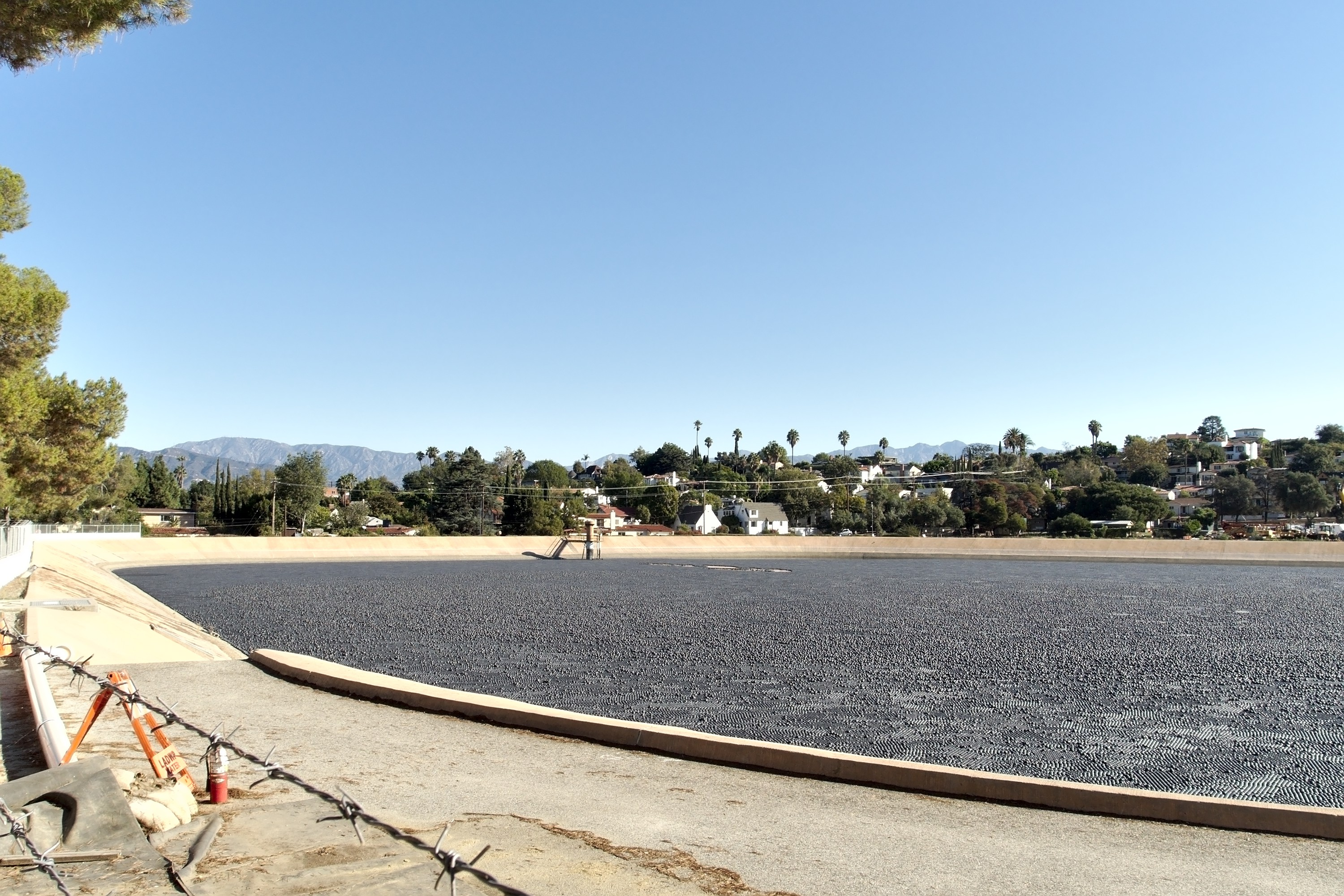
Ivanhoe Reservoir after addition of shade balls

== Environmental issues ==
In December 2007, the DWP announced that the Silver Lake and Ivanhoe reservoirs had both become contaminated with unusually high levels of the cancer-causing chemical bromate, and were immediately isolated. The reservoirs were both drained over several weeks in March 2008, and refilled in May 2008.

In June 2008, 400,000 black hollow plastic shade balls were placed in Ivanhoe, which remain in use, to reduce the likelihood of the sunlight-fueled bromate. Silver Lake Reservoir was taken offline permanently. This incident pointed out the necessity of protecting the water supply by using underground tanks. The black plastic balls were created in Allentown, Pennsylvania by Orange Products Inc. The balls are also used at airports to prevent birds from landing in water runoff, thus preventing birds from being drawn into aircraft engines. The balls were certified by NSF International which certifies the safety of food, water, and consumer goods. In February 2013 LADWP contracted with Glendora, California-based manufacturer XavierC LLC to supply an additional 6.4 million hollow plastic shade balls for reservoirs.

== In popular culture ==
The reservoir appeared in the 2018 movie Under the Silver Lake, directed by David Robert Mitchell.

The reservoir was featured in Visiting... with Huell Howser Episode 1610.

== See also ==
- List of dams and reservoirs in California
- List of lakes in California
