= Mike Gioulakis =

American cinematographer (born 1982)

- Born: September 17, 1982 (age 43); Plantation, Florida, U.S.
- Education: Florida State University (BFA)
- Occupation: Cinematographer
- Years active: 2005–present

Michael Gioulakis (born September 17, 1982) is an American cinematographer, best known for his work with directors David Robert Mitchell, M. Night Shyamalan, and Jordan Peele.

== Early life ==
Gioulakis was born in Plantation, Florida, and grew up outside Fort Lauderdale. He started playing trumpet from a young age, as his mother and father both studied music at Boston University and Berklee College of Music, respectively. His father, Dinos, was born in Athens and grew up in Nikaia, Greece. During his senior year of high school, Gioulakis went to Interlochen Center for the Arts, an "arts and musical boarding school," focusing on trumpet performance and minoring in photography. He changed career paths after being inspired by the photography of Gregory Crewdson, Philip-Lorca diCorcia, Charlie White, and Erwin Olaf. He attended Florida State University and graduated with a Bachelor of Fine Arts.

== Career ==
=== Early years and It Follows (2007–2014) ===
Shortly after his graduation from FSU, Gioulakis made a "no-budget" feature near Philadelphia with friends, then moved to New York where he shot short films, music videos, and worked as a gaffer on some feature films and commercials for companies like Samsung and IBM. After "several years" of work in New York, he moved to Los Angeles shortly before the 2007–08 Writers Guild of America strike. He worked in lighting on television series and "stopped pursuing DP work", opting to use the experience to learn as many strategies and problem-solving methods as possible.

In 2010, Gioulakis was contacted to serve as cinematographer for Don Coscarelli's film John Dies at the End, which premiered at the 2012 Sundance Film Festival. This job led to him shooting several more independent feature films, including Dustin Guy Defa's Bad Fever in 2011 and Mike Ott's Pearlblossom Hwy in 2012.

He was hired to shoot the 2014 horror film It Follows. Gioulakis spoke with director David Robert Mitchell on the visual references they wanted to invoke for It Follows, including the films of director John Carpenter, the films Paris, Texas, Blue Velvet, and Rear Window, and the photography of Gregory Crewdson. According to Gioulakis, "about 90 percent" of the film was shot using the Arri Alexa camera, with a Red Epic being utilized for shots requiring a smaller rig. The primary lenses used for filming were the Cooke Optics S4s, with an 18mm lens used for "maybe 80 percent of the film". An Angénieux lens and Arri's Alura lens were also used. For his work, Gioulakis received a nomination for Best Cinematography at the 31st Independent Spirit Awards. The same year, Gioulakis again collaborated with Ott to shoot Lake Los Angeles.

=== Continued success (2015–present) ===
After finishing It Follows, Gioulakis was hired to shoot director M. Night Shyamalan's 2016 film Split. Gioulakis roomed with Shyamalan in Philadelphia and watched various films for visual inspiration, including Michael Haneke's Caché and Yorgos Lanthimos' Dogtooth. Shyamalan noted that a particular style borrowed from Dogtooth was "a character just standing up out of frame or walking out, or you see just their shoulder". The film premiered at Fantastic Fest on September 26, 2016, before being theatrically released in the United States on January 20, 2017. In 2017, he collaborated with Ott a third time to shoot California Dreams.

Gioulakis re-teamed with Mitchell to shoot the neo-noir film Under the Silver Lake which premiered at the 2018 Cannes Film Festival, where it competed for the Palme d'Or. It is scheduled to be released in the United States on April 19, 2019, over a year after its Cannes premiere. Gioulakis also re-teamed with Shyamalan to lens Split's sequel Glass, which was released in the United States on January 17, 2019. Also in 2019, he served as cinematographer for director Jordan Peele's horror film Us, which premiered at South by Southwest on March 8, 2019, before being released in the United States on March 22, 2019. During a late scene in the film, Gioulakis used a split-focus diopter effect, which was compared to Brian De Palma's style and filmography.

Gioulakis again worked with Shyamalan on the Apple TV+ series Servant, which premiered in November 2019. He served as director of photography for all ten episodes in season 1.

In 2022, Gioulakis became a member of the American Society of Cinematographers.

== Filmography ==
=== Film ===
Year	Title	Director	Notes	Ref.
2011	Bad Fever	Dustin Guy Defa		
2012	John Dies at the End	Don Coscarelli		
2012	Pearblossom Hwy	Mike Ott		
2014	It Follows	David Robert Mitchell	Nominated – Independent Spirit Award for Best Cinematography	
2014	Lake Los Angeles	Mike Ott		
2016	Split	M. Night Shyamalan		
2017	California Dreams	Mike Ott		
2018	Under the Silver Lake	David Robert Mitchell		
2019	Glass	M. Night Shyamalan		
2019	Us	Jordan Peele		
2021	Old	M. Night Shyamalan		
2021	The Eyes of Tammy Faye	Michael Showalter		
2023	Reptile	Grant Singer		
2024	Sasquatch Sunset	Nathan Zellner; David Zellner		
2024	The Piano Lesson	Malcolm Washington		
2026	The End of Oak Street	David Robert Mitchell		
2026	Alpha Gang †	Nathan Zellner; David Zellner	Post-production	
TBA	They Follow †	David Robert Mitchell	Filming	

=== Television ===
Year	Title	Director(s)	Notes	Ref.
2013	Futurestates	Mohammad Gorjestani	Episode "Refuge"	
2019–2023	Servant	M. Night Shyamalan; Daniel Sackheim; Nimród Antal; Alexis Ostrander; John Dahl; Ishana Night Shyamalan	12 episodes	
2020	Unemployable	Mike Ott	Episode "Pilot"	
