= Shade ball =

Plastic balls used in reservoirs for environmental protection and evaporation reduction

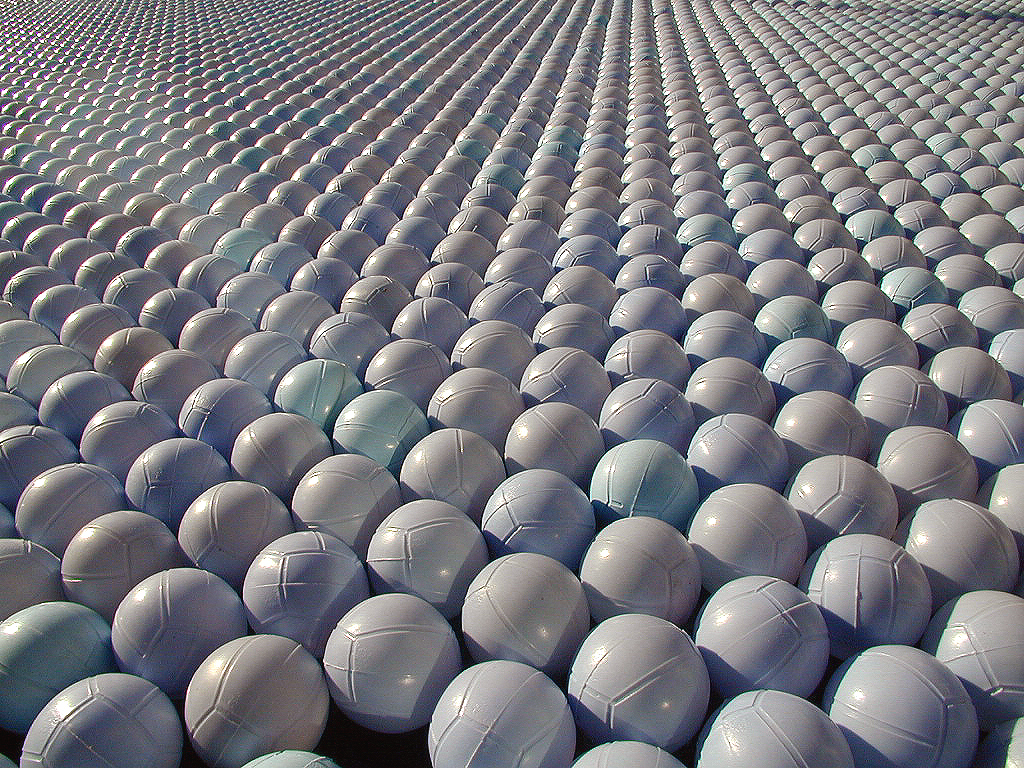
Shade balls covering a swimming pool at a hotel

A shade ball is a small plastic sphere floated on top of a reservoir for environmental reasons, including to slow evaporation and prevent sunlight from causing reactions among chemical compounds present in the water. Also known as bird balls, they were developed initially to prevent birds from landing in bodies of water.

== History ==
Shade balls were originally known as bird balls, as they were developed initially to prevent birds from landing on toxic tailing ponds produced by mining operations.

They have also been used by airports to prevent birds from being attracted to nearby drainage ponds, thus reducing collisions with planes.

=== Usage by LADWP ===
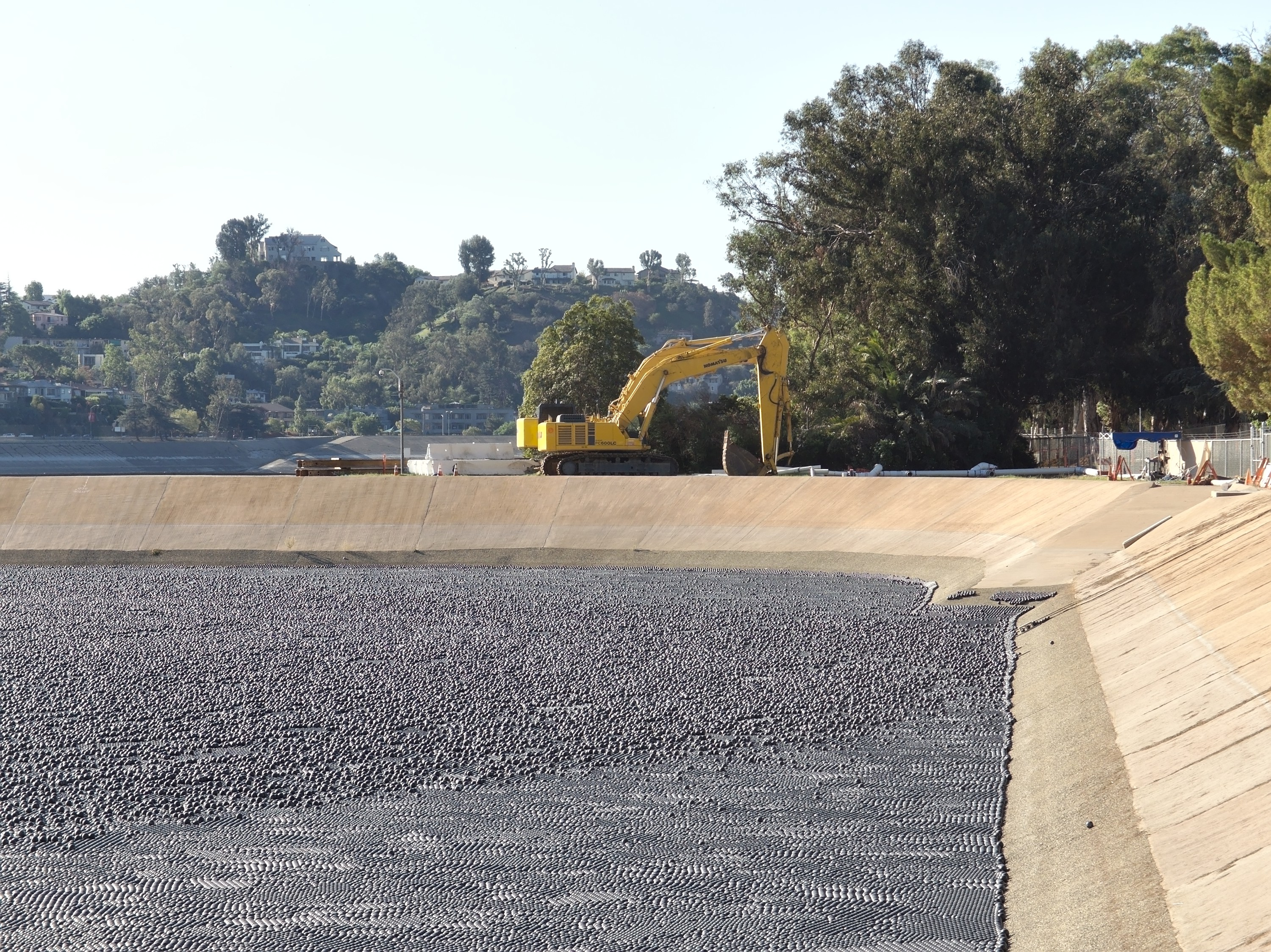
Shade balls in the Ivanhoe Reservoir, 2015

Starting in mid-2009, the Los Angeles Department of Water and Power (LADWP) put about 400,000 balls in the Ivanhoe reservoir with the main objective of preventing the formation of a carcinogenic chemical, bromate, which forms when sunlight interacts with naturally occurring bromine and the chlorine added to prevent algae growth. In the original release by the LADWP, there is no mention of water conservation as an objective and the project was planned for a five-year life span, until a Griffith Park project was completed. The reduction in evaporation led to an estimated savings of about 1.1 billion L (290 million US gal) of water in one year.

In 2014 and 2015, the LADWP put 96 million shade balls onto its largest reservoir (Las Virgenes) in response to the United States Environmental Protection Agency's surface water treatment rule, which requires large reservoirs of treated water to be covered. The LADWP says that in addition to reducing evaporation, they also reduce UV radiation by-products and algae growth. The balls saved 1.7 million cubic metres of water from evaporating during their deployment from August 2015 to March 2017. However, they required 2.9 million cubic metres of water in their manufacture. Nevertheless, the balls have a lifespan of ten years, and the plastic may be reused after that.

==== Construction ====
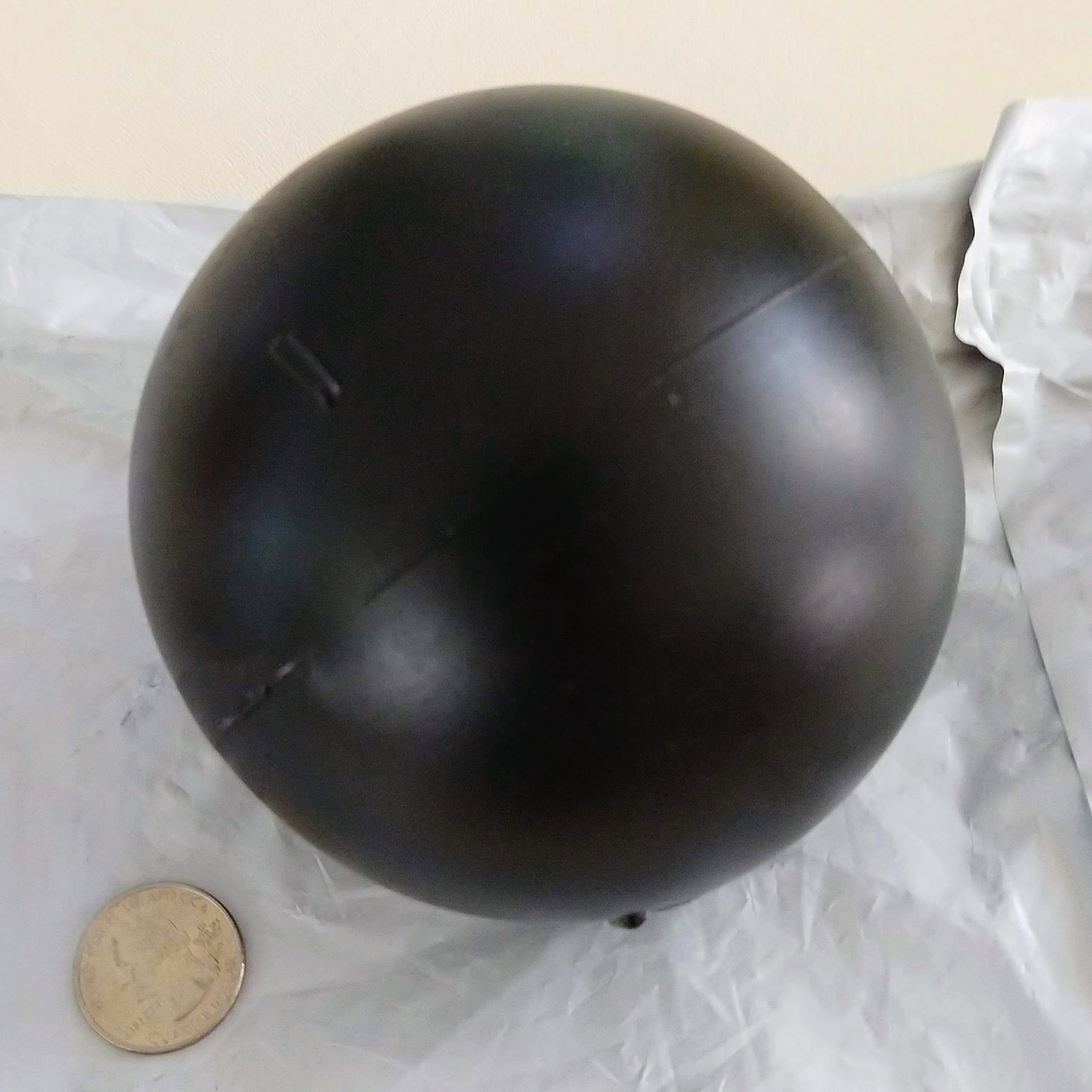
A single shade ball

The shade balls used in the Los Angeles project are made of high-density polyethylene (HDPE) with carbon black additive to make the balls opaque and protect the plastic from ultraviolet radiation. Adding carbon black also prevents the formation of bromate, a suspected human carcinogen.

They are about 4 inches (10 cm) in diameter, and are partially filled with water to prevent their being blown by wind. HDPE plastic is commonly used for food and beverage containers as well as water distribution pipes.
