= Clawson, Michigan =

- City
- City of Clawson
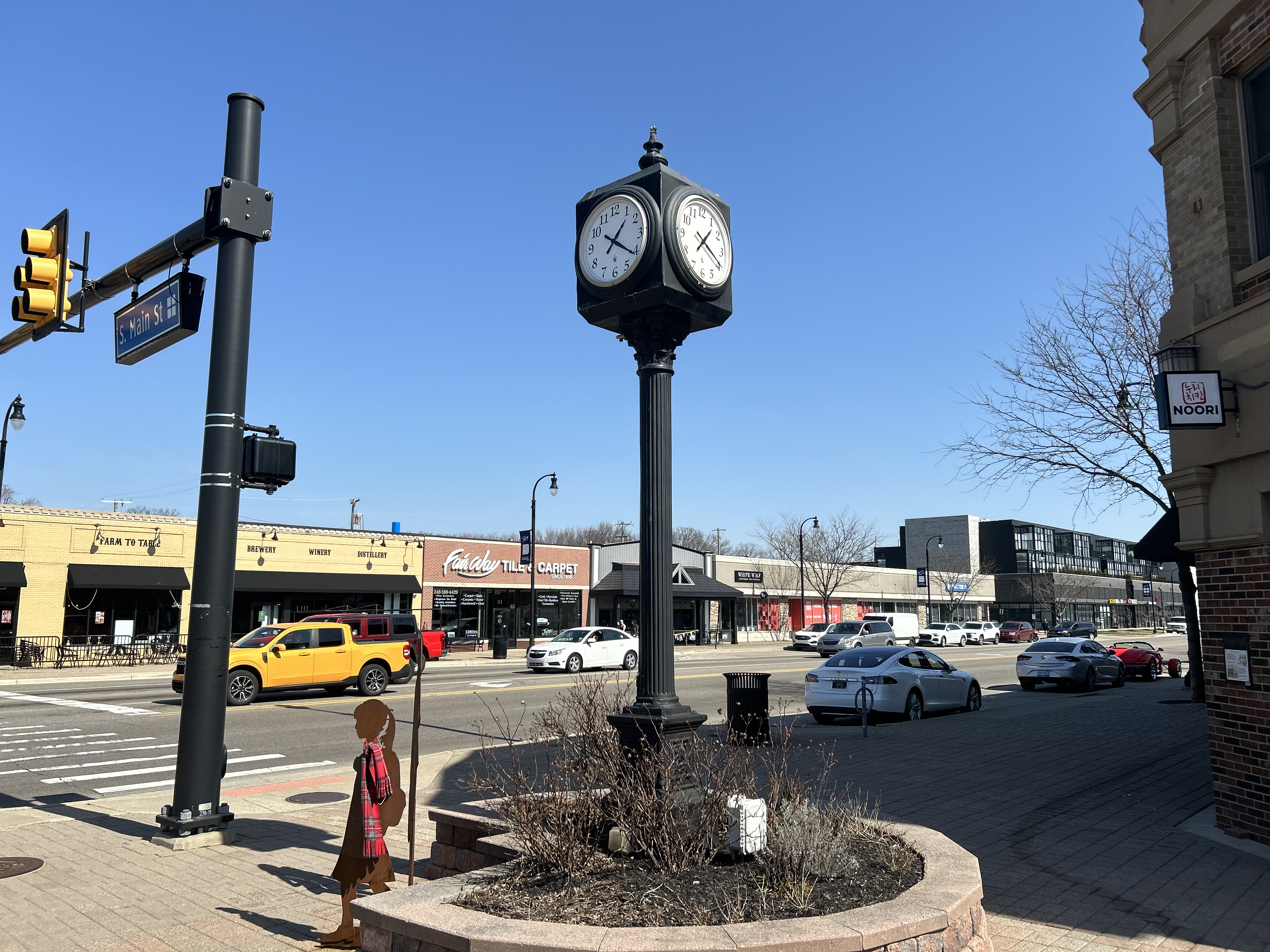
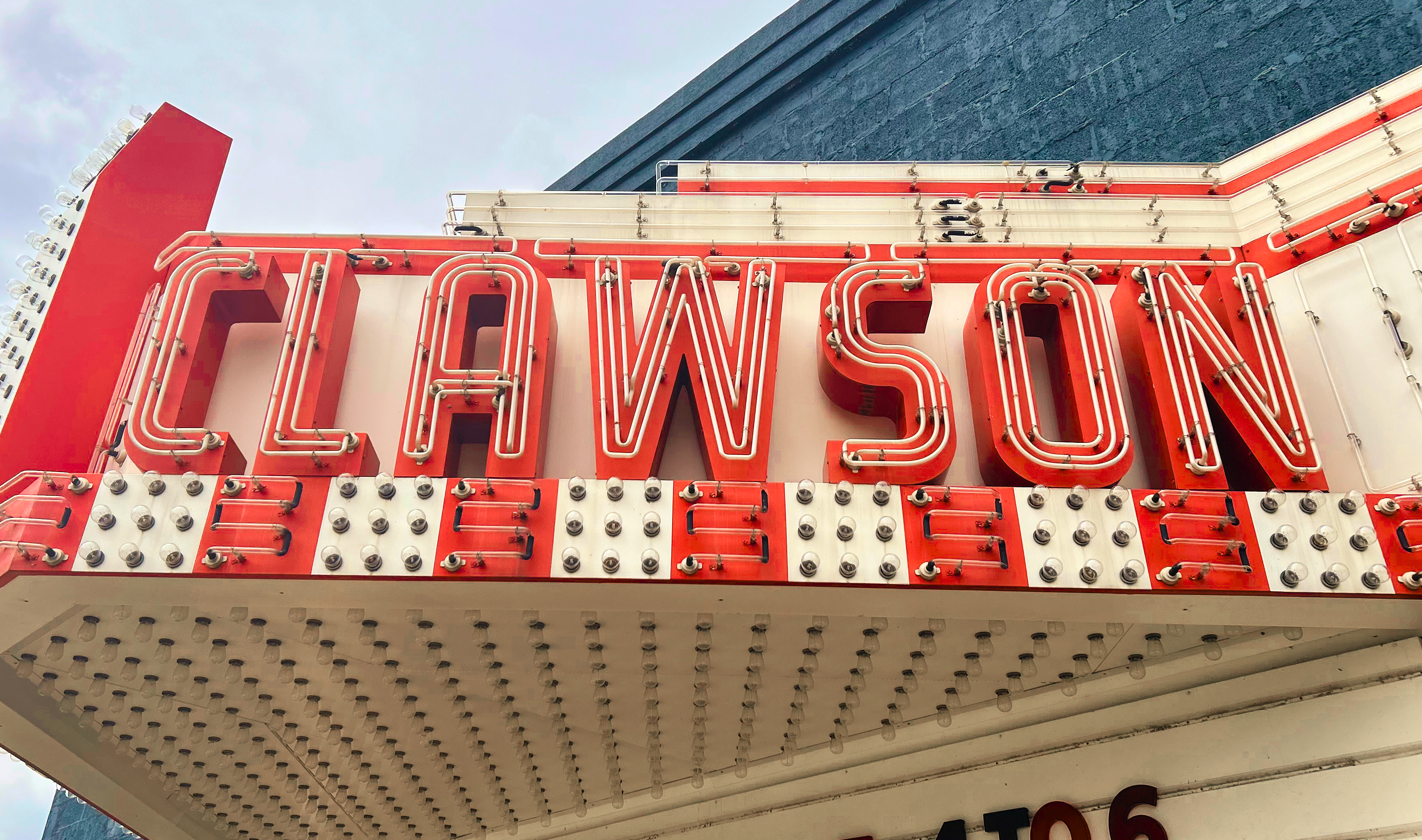
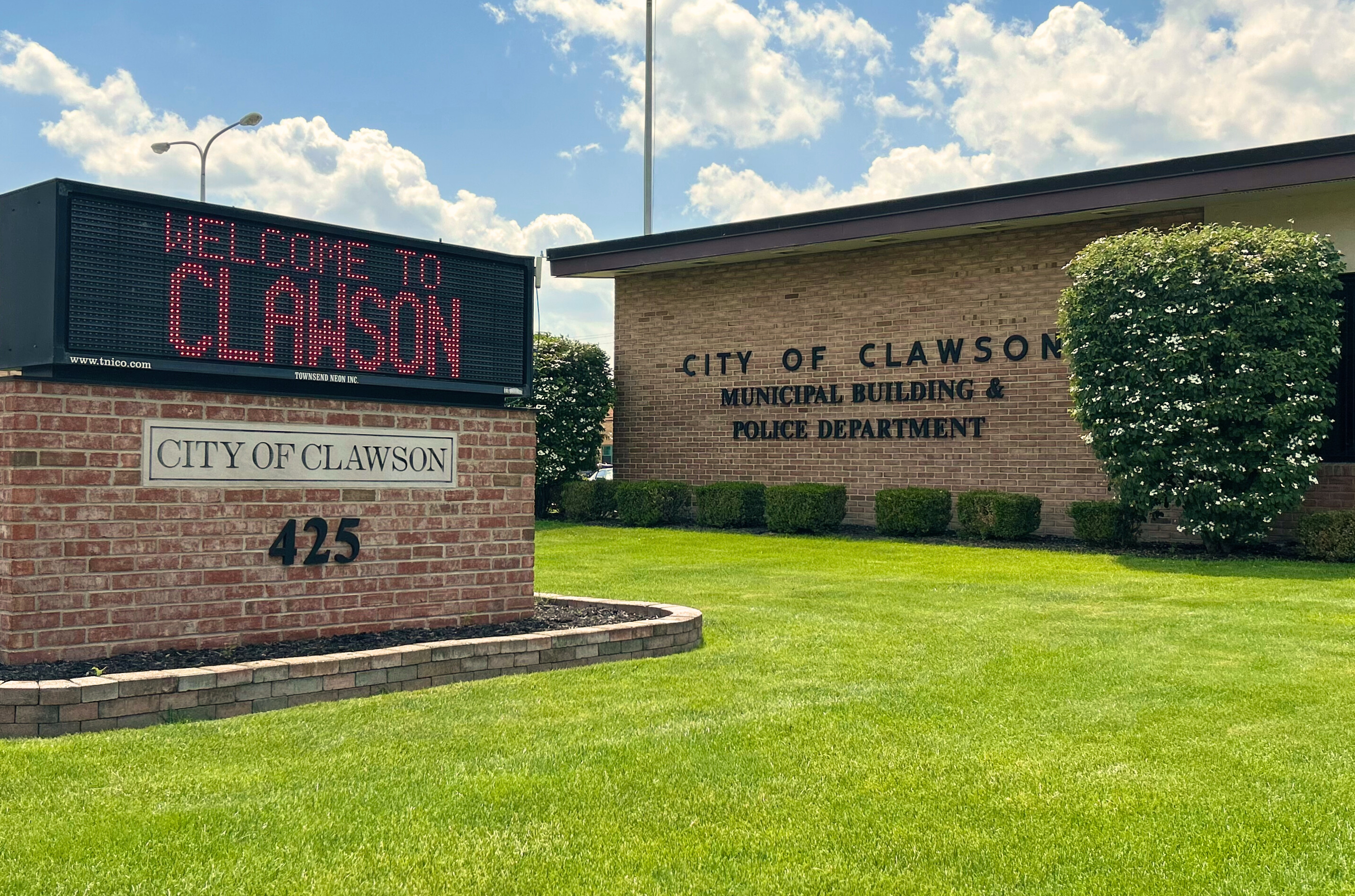
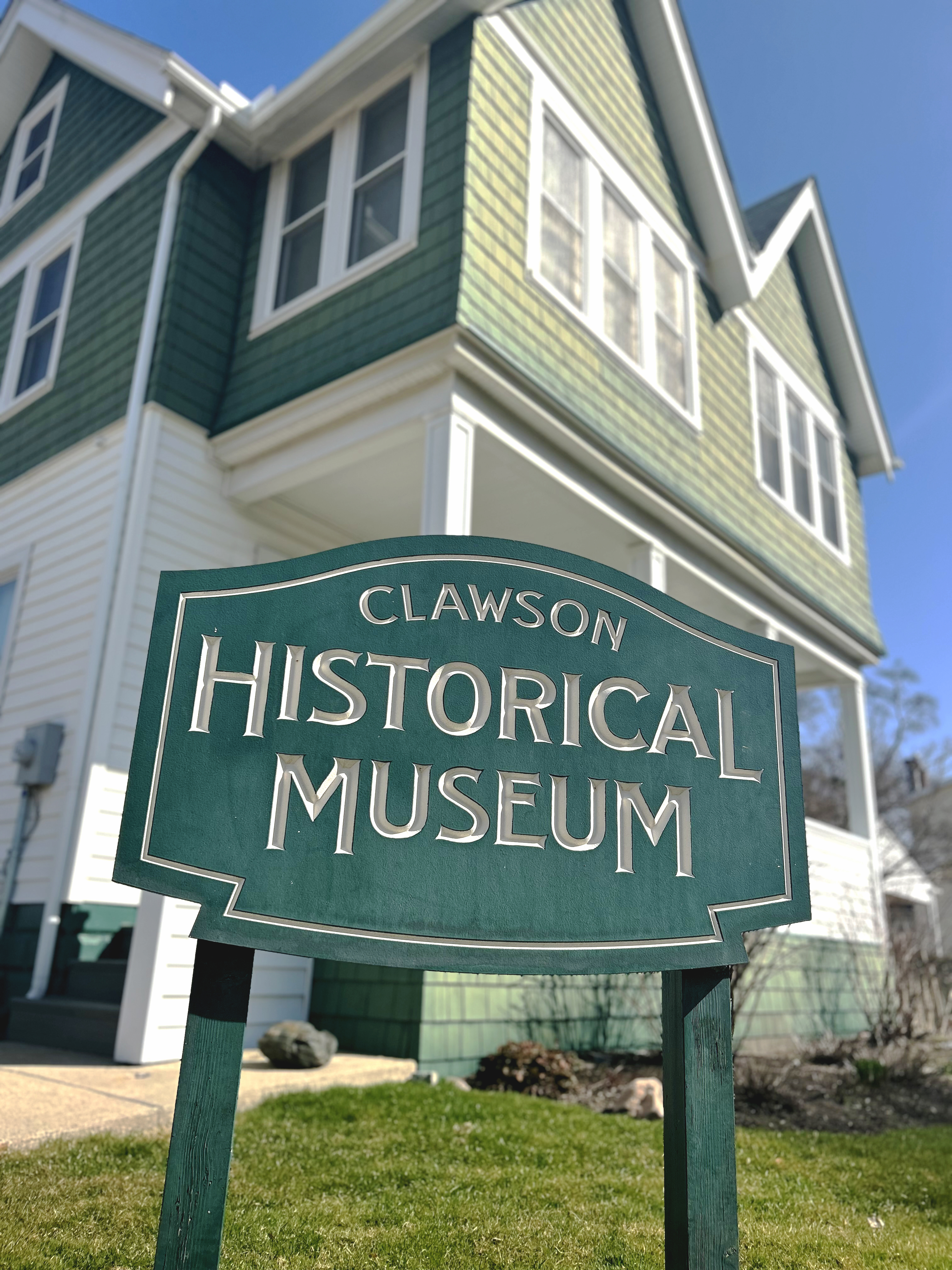
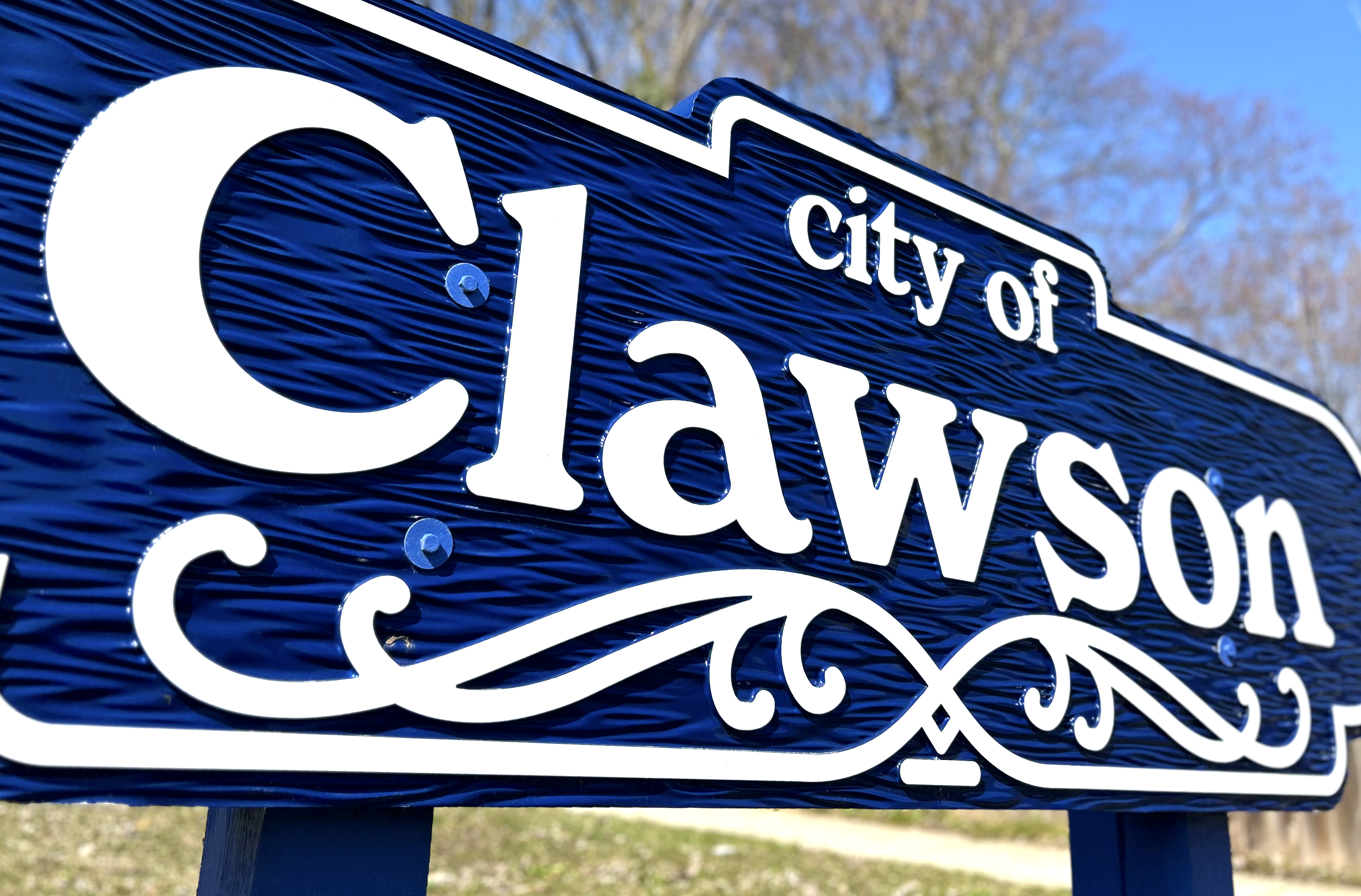
- Pictured top to bottom, left to right: Downtown Clawson, Clawson marquee sign, City Municipal Building and Police Department, Clawson Historical Museum, and City of Clawson sign

- Flag Seal Official Logo
- Nickname: C-Town
- Motto: "Little City with a Big Heart"
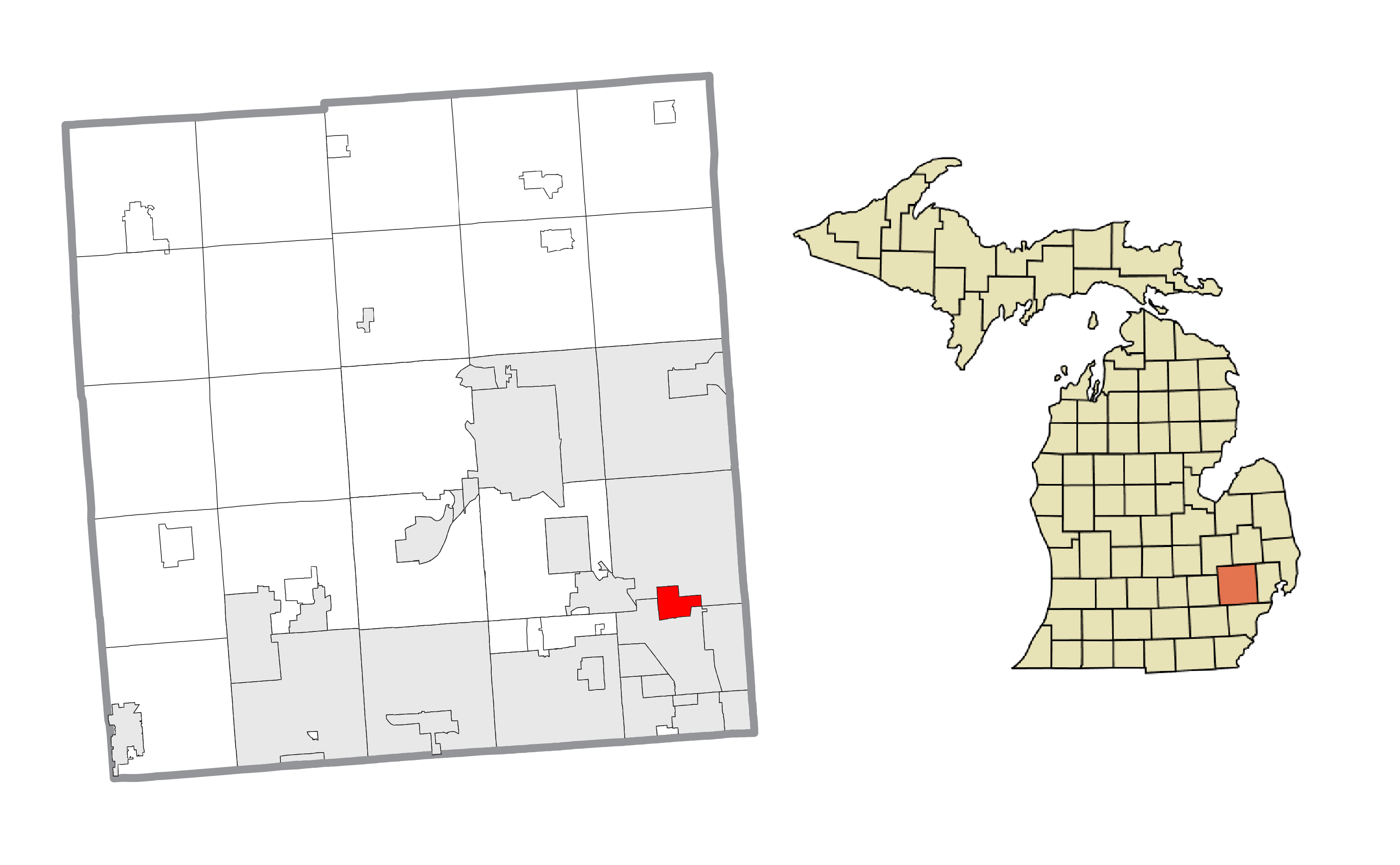
- Location within Oakland County

- Location within the state of Michigan
- Coordinates: 42°32′00″N 83°08′47″W
- Country: United States
- State: Michigan
- County: Oakland
- Incorporated: May 12, 1920 (village); June 12, 1940 (city)

Government
  - Type: Council–manager
  - Mayor: Susan Moffitt
  - Manager: Joseph Rheker III

Area
  - City: 2.20 sq mi (5.70 km^{2})
  - Land: 2.20 sq mi (5.70 km^{2})
  - Water: 0 sq mi (0.00 km^{2})
- Elevation: 663 ft (202 m)

Population (2020)
  - City: 11,389
  - Density: 5,177.6/sq mi (1,999.09/km^{2})
  - Metro: 4,296,250 (Metro Detroit)
- Demonym: Clawsonite
- Time zone: UTC-5 (EST)
  - Summer (DST): UTC-4 (EDT)
- ZIP code(s): 48017
- Area code: 248
- FIPS code: 26-16160
- GNIS feature ID: 0623389
- Website: Official website

Clawson is a city in Oakland County in the U.S. state of Michigan. A northern suburb of Detroit, Clawson is located about 19 miles (31 km) north of downtown Detroit. As of the 2020 census, the city had a population of 11,389.

== History ==
This area was occupied by the historic Potowatomi people, who were among the indigenous peoples in the Detroit territory. They traded furs for goods for years with the French Canadians and English colonists.

The city's name is a misspelling of the surname of John C. Lawson, an early European-American settler. It was founded by European Americans in 1829 and was originally known as Pumachug and The Corners. The name was inspired by the sound made by the Cider Mill and Saw Mill on each corner of the main intersection. The sound was described as "pum-a-chug, pum-a-chug." The city was incorporated as Clawson in 1920 as a village; in 1940 it was incorporated as a city.

== Geography ==
According to the United States Census Bureau, the city has a total area of 2.20 square miles (5.70 km^{2}), all land.

== Demographics ==
Historical population
Census	Pop.	Note	%±
1930	3,377		—
1940	4,006		18.6%
1950	5,196		29.7%
1960	14,795		184.7%
1970	17,617		19.1%
1980	15,103		−14.3%
1990	13,874		−8.1%
2000	12,732		−8.2%
2010	11,825		−7.1%
2020	11,389		−3.7%
U.S. Decennial Census

=== 2020 census ===
As of the 2020 census, Clawson had a population of 11,389. The median age was 39.4 years. 14.9% of residents were under the age of 18 and 17.8% of residents were 65 years of age or older. For every 100 females there were 100.3 males, and for every 100 females age 18 and over there were 98.1 males age 18 and over.

100.0% of residents lived in urban areas, while 0.0% lived in rural areas.

There were 5,607 households in Clawson, of which 18.9% had children under the age of 18 living in them. Of all households, 38.5% were married-couple households, 25.1% were households with a male householder and no spouse or partner present, and 28.5% were households with a female householder and no spouse or partner present. About 41.1% of all households were made up of individuals and 13.6% had someone living alone who was 65 years of age or older.

There were 5,819 housing units, of which 3.6% were vacant. The homeowner vacancy rate was 0.8% and the rental vacancy rate was 5.3%.

Racial composition as of the 2020 census
Race	Number	Percent
White	10,126	88.9%
Black or African American	183	1.6%
American Indian and Alaska Native	20	0.2%
Asian	245	2.2%
Native Hawaiian and Other Pacific Islander	15	0.1%
Some other race	110	1.0%
Two or more races	690	6.1%
Hispanic or Latino (of any race)	356	3.1%

=== 2010 census ===
At the 2010 census, there were 11,825 people, 5,460 households and 2,992 families living in the city. The population density was 5,375.0 inhabitants per square mile (2,075.3/km^{2}). There were 5,791 housing units at an average density of 2,632.3 per square mile (1,016.3/km^{2}). The racial makeup was 93.4% White, 1.9% African American, 0.3% Native American, 2.0% Asian, 0.4% from other races, and 1.9% from two or more races. Hispanic or Latino of any race were 2.1% of the population.

There were 5,460 households, of which 23.5% had children under the age of 18 living with them, 41.8% were married couples living together, 8.9% had a female householder with no husband present, 4.1% had a male householder with no wife present, and 45.2% were non-families. 38.2% of all households were made up of individuals, and 11.8% had someone living alone who was 65 years of age or older. The average household size was 2.14 and the average family size was 2.88.

The median age was 39.9 years. 17.9% of residents were under the age of 18; 7.6% were between the ages of 18 and 24; 31.4% were from 25 to 44; 28.4% were from 45 to 64; and 14.8% were 65 years of age or older. The sex makeup was 49.0% male and 51.0% female.

=== 2000 census ===
At the 2000 census, there were 12,732 people, 5,572 households and 3,259 families living in the city. The population density was 5,787.0 inhabitants per square mile (2,234.4/km^{2}). There were 5,676 housing units at an average density of 2,579.9 per square mile (996.1/km^{2}). The racial makeup was 96.10% White, 0.80% African American, 0.34% Native American, 1.32% Asian, 0.25% from other races, and 1.19% from two or more races. Hispanic and Latino of any race were 1.14% of the population.

There were 5,572 households, of which 25.1% had children under the age of 18 living with them, 46.8% were married couples living together, 8.9% had a female householder with no husband present, and 41.5% were non-families. 35.2% of all households were made up of individuals, and 12.5% had someone living alone who was 65 years of age or older. The average household size was 2.26 and the average family size was 2.98.

20.6% of the population were under the age of 18, 7.5% from 18 to 24, 34.8% from 25 to 44, 21.9% from 45 to 64, and 15.2% who were 65 years of age or older. The median age was 38 years. For every 100 females, there were 94.0 males. For every 100 females age 18 and over, there were 89.5 males.

The median household income was $50,929 and the median family income was $64,684. Males had a median income of $45,242 and females $30,679. The per capita income was $25,676. About 1.4% of families and 3.5% of the population were below the poverty line, including 1.6% of those under age 18 and 4.8% of those age 65 or over.

== Government ==
Clawson utilizes the council–manager form of government, and thus is governed by a city council consisting of a mayor and six council members. The city council appoints a city manager, who manages the day-to-day operations of the city.

=== Federal, state, and county legislators ===
United States House of Representatives
District	Representative	Party	Since
11th	Haley Stevens	Democratic	2019

Michigan Senate
District	Senator	Party	Since
3rd	Stephanie Chang	Democratic	2023
8th	Mallory McMorrow	Democratic	2019 (Note: McMorrow has represented Clawson since 2019, but has only represented the 8th district since 2023.)

Michigan House of Representatives
District	Representative	Party	Since
56th	Sharon MacDonnell	Democratic	2023

Oakland County Board of Commissioners
District	Commissioner	Party	Since
2	Penny Luebs	Democratic	2019

== Education ==
The city of Clawson is entirely within the boundaries of Clawson Public Schools.

Japhet School, a private school, is located in a former YWCA building in Clawson. It moved there in August 2013 from its previous location in Madison Heights.

== Notable people ==
- Mark Campbell, tight end for the New Orleans Saints
- Lou Cotton, Musician We Came As Romans
- Tim Gleason, defenseman for the Toronto Maple Leafs; 2010 Olympian, ice hockey
- Jon Jansen, offensive tackle for the Washington Redskins
- David Robert Mitchell (born 1974), American film director
- Dan Scanlon, director at Pixar Animation Studios
- Drew Schultz, Motown Musician, composer, and producer.
