= Monsters Ate My Birthday Cake =

2014 video game

- Developer: SleepNinja Games
- Publisher: Cartoon Network Games
- Programmers: Yori Kvitchko; Brandon Moreno
- Artist: Justin Baldwin
- Writer: Alex Atkins
- Composer: Rich Vreeland
- Platforms: Android; iOS; Windows; OS X
- Release: Android, iOS; 26 June 2014; Windows, OS X; 1 July 2014
- Genre: Puzzle
- Mode: Single-player

Monsters Ate My Birthday Cake is a game developed by American indie studio SleepNinja Games for the iPad, Android, Windows, and OS X platforms and published by Cartoon Network. It was released in June 2014. The art and animation was done by Justin Baldwin, the programming by Yori Kvitchko and Brandon Moreno, the writing by Alex Atkins, sound design by Jordan Fehr. the music by Rich Vreeland, who had previously done the soundtrack of Fez. Development was assisted by a Kickstarter campaign that began in January 2013, and a demo version was displayed at the Portland Retro Gaming Expo in October 2013. Aimed at younger gamers, the game has simple puzzles early on and about ten hours of gameplay.

== Gameplay ==
It is a strategic puzzle game, with a boy protagonist Niko, who is joined by friendly monsters in his quest against the evil boogins, who stole his birthday cake. Niko is initially alone, but is soon joined by monsters, each of which has a unique ability such as burrowing in dirt areas, charging down brittle obstacles, freezing water so rivers can be crossed, or shattering crystal with piercing shrieks. Control can be switched between Niko and monsters. Niko can buy different outfits, some of which have special powers. He can also collect coins to buy items or fetch treasure to return to grateful villagers or monsters. There are four regions to explore outside of Niko's village.

== Reception ==
The game was highly rated by ABC's Good Game: Spawn Point hosts Hex and Bajo, who gave it 8.5 and 9 out of 10 rubber chickens respectively. Marcus Estrada praised the monster switching and found the game "fun", rating it 3.5 out of 5. Listed number 1 on a list of 18 "addictive" little games by CoolSmartPhone.
