= Japhet School =

Location
- 839 S. Crooks Rd. Clawson, Michigan 48017; United States

Information
- Type: Private, Coeducational
- Established: 1973
- Grades: Preschool–8
- Tuition: $12,525
- Website: http://japhetschool.org

The Japhet School is a preschool-8th grade private school in Clawson, Michigan in Metro Detroit.

Founded in 1973, it is an independent school, teaching children in preschool through 8th grade. Its mission is to nurture and prepare children for life by integrating character education with an academic program. The school provides small classes, which are purposefully designed as “blends,” or two-grade classrooms. This setup enables teachers to challenge students with academic material that is appropriate for their intellectual readiness, regardless of age or grade. The Japhet School is a small school with six classrooms, fewer than 100 children attend each year.

Integrated with academics is Japhet School's character education curriculum, which aims to build a peaceful community within the school and give Japhet students a foundation of character. Japhet is a National School of Character, and was the first school in Michigan, (and the first independent school in the country) to receive this award. Despite Japhet's small size, large neighboring school districts have engaged Japhet School educators to train their own teachers in Japhet's character education method. Japhet staff also travels out of state to conduct this training.

== History ==
In 1973, a group of teachers and parents founded the school. Their rationale was that public schools were no longer being "moral educators".

For the 2001-2002 school year Japhet was one of nine schools to be named a "National Character School" by the Character Education Partnership.

In 2013, Japhet School celebrated its 40th anniversary. On August 20 of that year it moved from its former Madison Heights campus to a renovated former YWCA building in Clawson.

During the COVID-19 pandemic, the students co-wrote a book together virtually instead of their usual annual theatrical production. In response to the Russo-Ukrainian War, students held a drive to send supplies such as clothing, coloring books, stuffed animals, hygiene kits, and blankets to support Ukrainian children.

== Demographics and class sizes ==
A low student-to-teacher ratio (fewer than 20 students in first through eighth grades) gives individual support and increased opportunity to excel. Each classroom has two grades within it, a purposeful design to enable academic individualization. Students in all grades know each other by name, and teachers and staff know each child in the school.

Japhet School teachers teach children for two years in this small setting. This affords first-hand knowledge and awareness of each student's accomplishments and potential, as well as insight into the learning styles of each child.

In 2022, the school's student population was 32, with a racial minority student enrollment of 12.5% and a student-teacher ratio of 3:1.

== Tuition ==
As of 2002 the average annual tuition was $6,900 ($12351.06 when adjusted for inflation).

== Extra-curricular activities, programs, and special events ==
The school does not offer religious education. The school has "Inspo", a weekly assembly involving speakers giving speeches to students.

The school offers educational programs during the summer.

A summer Peace Camp involves children in various peace-building activities such as learning about other cultures, painting banners, and field trips.
