= They Follow =

Upcoming horror film by David Robert Mitchell

- Directed by: David Robert Mitchell
- Written by: David Robert Mitchell
- Produced by: David Robert Mitchell
- Starring: Maika Monroe; Naomi Ackie; Jackie Earle Haley; Michael Gandolfini; Justine Lupe
- Cinematography: Mike Gioulakis
- Production companies: Neon; Good Fear Content
- Distributed by: Neon
- Country: United States
- Language: English

They Follow is an upcoming American psychological horror film written and directed by David Robert Mitchell and is the sequel to the film It Follows (2014). The film stars Maika Monroe and Keir Gilchrist, both returning from the first film, along with Naomi Ackie, Jackie Earle Haley, Michael Gandolfini, and Justine Lupe joining the cast.

The film is set to be theatrically released in the United States by Neon.

== Cast ==
- Maika Monroe as Jaime "Jay" Height, a now-adult woman targeted by the entity that haunted her a decade earlier
- Keir Gilchrist as Paul, a friend of Jay's involved in the prior haunting
- Naomi Ackie
- Jackie Earle Haley
- Michael Gandolfini
- Justine Lupe
- Anna Mirodin
- Jayne Taini
- Tom Pecinka
- Melora Walters
- Ben Krieger
- Natalie Shinnick
- Jan Hoag
- James Jordan

== Production ==
In April 2015, Radius-TWC co-president Tom Quinn announced that the studio was looking into a possible sequel to It Follows (2014). Quinn had expressed the idea of flipping the concept of the first film around, with Jaime "Jay" Height or another protagonist going down the chain to find the origin of "it".

In October 2023, it was announced that a sequel, entitled They Follow, was in pre-production with writer-director David Robert Mitchell and star Maika Monroe returning. Neon, Quinn's second film studio, would produce and distribute the film domestically. In June 2026, Naomi Ackie was in final talks to join the film. In July 2026, Jackie Earle Haley, Michael Gandolfini, and Justine Lupe joined the film.

Principal photography began in July 2026. It was previously set to begin filming in 2024 and 2025, before it was delayed to 2026. Filming wrapped in September 2026. James Jordan would also be revealed as part of the cast.

== Release ==
They Follow is set to be theatrically released by Neon, in the United States.
