= Under the Silver Lake =

2018 film by David Robert Mitchell

- Theatrical release poster
- Directed by: David Robert Mitchell
- Written by: David Robert Mitchell
- Produced by: Michael De Luca; Chris Bender; Jake Weiner; Adele Romanski; David Robert Mitchell
- Starring: Andrew Garfield; Riley Keough; Topher Grace
- Cinematography: Michael Gioulakis
- Edited by: Julio C. Perez IV
- Music by: Disasterpeace
- Production companies: Vendian Entertainment; VX119 Media Capital; Stay Gold Features; Good Fear; Michael De Luca Productions; Pastel Productions; UnLtd Productions; Salem Street Entertainment; Boo Pictures
- Distributed by: A24
- Release dates: May 15, 2018 (Cannes); April 19, 2019 (United States)
- Running time: 139 minutes
- Country: United States
- Language: English
- Budget: $8 million
- Box office: $2.1 million

Under the Silver Lake is a 2018 American black comedy thriller film written, produced and directed by David Robert Mitchell. Set in 2011 Los Angeles, it follows a young man (Andrew Garfield) investigating the sudden disappearance of his neighbor (Riley Keough), only to stumble upon an elusive and dangerous conspiracy.

Under the Silver Lake premiered on May 15, 2018, at the Cannes Film Festival, where it competed for the Palme d'Or, before being released nationwide in France on August 8. It was released theatrically in the United States on April 19, 2019, by A24. The film received polarized reviews from critics, and it has amassed a cult following in the years since its release.

== Plot ==
In the summer of 2011, Sam is an aimless 33-year-old in Silver Lake, Los Angeles, more interested in conspiracy theories than paying his overdue rent. Spying on a topless neighbor, Sam notices another neighbor, Sarah, and learns that billionaire Jefferson Sevence has disappeared. Sarah invites Sam over to watch How to Marry a Millionaire, but they are interrupted by her roommates; she suggests he come back the next day, and Sam attacks a group of boys for vandalizing his car.

In the morning, Sam discovers Sarah and her roommates have moved out overnight, with a symbol painted in their apartment. He follows a stranger from the apartment to a rooftop party in Downtown Los Angeles, where a Balloon Girl and the band Jesus & the Brides of Dracula perform. Sam tries to confront the stranger, and Sevence's daughter, Millicent, leaves upon learning her father has died. He is given a cookie as his ticket to the band's private show at Hollywood Forever Cemetery, and the news reveals Sevence and three women burned to death in a car, with evidence one of them was Sarah.

Sam visits the Comic Fan, the author of a zine called Under the Silver Lake, who explains that the symbol in Sarah's apartment is a hobo code meaning "stay quiet". The Comic Fan insists that hidden messages are everywhere, possibly connecting Sarah's disappearance, a mysterious Dog Killer, and the Owl's Kiss—a supernatural murderer appearing as a nude woman in an owl mask—and shows Sam a collector's cereal box containing a map of Los Angeles.

At the cemetery show, Sam is required to bite the cookie to enter and meets the Balloon Girl, who knew Sarah. Drugged by the cookie, Sam chases after the stranger but passes out at Janet Gaynor's grave. An actress working for "Shooting Stars" escort service remembers Sarah from a party, where they were forbidden from entering a wealthy songwriter's home. Decoding a message hidden in the band's new album, Sam is led from Griffith Observatory by the self-proclaimed Homeless King to a secret underground shelter, with tunnels throughout the city.

The Comic Fan appears to have committed suicide, but his home surveillance footage reveals a visit from the Owl's Kiss. Taking the cereal box, Sam is brought to a chess party, where he forces the band's frontman to admit that some of his songs were provided by the mysterious songwriter. Balloon Girl and her fellow Shooting Stars lead Sam to the elderly Songwriter, who claims to have ghostwritten history's most popular music, encoded with hidden messages. The Songwriter shoots at Sam when he demands to know who paid him, and Sam beats him to death with Kurt Cobain's guitar.

Stalked by the Owl's Kiss, Sam is spared when his landlord arrives with a sheriff's deputy, giving him one more day before eviction. Following a coyote to another party, Sam meets Millicent Sevence, swimming together in Silver Lake Reservoir. Giving him a bracelet matching Sarah's, Millicent is fatally shot and sinks underwater in a pose eerily similar to Sam's favorite vintage Playboy cover. Sam realizes the bracelet is engraved with chess moves, using them to plot coordinates on a Nintendo Power diagram and overlaying the map from the cereal box to reveal an off-the-grid location in the Hollywood Hills.

There, Sam finds the stranger, Troy, and her two friends with a man, who offers him tea and explains that throughout history, wealthy men like him have sealed themselves with three wives in elaborate tombs, including the underground shelter, in order for their souls to "ascend" to another domain. Sarah and her roommates were Sevence's wives, having faked their deaths and already been sealed underground. Speaking with Sam by video phone, Sarah is at peace with her fate. Drugged by the tea, Sam is interrogated by the Homeless King, who is annoyed by dog biscuits in his pocket, but lets him go.

Returning home, Sam has sex with his topless neighbor, whose parrot repeats an incomprehensible word. From her balcony, Sam watches as his landlord and the deputy enter his apartment to evict him, discovering a wall painted with the "stay quiet" symbol.

== Cast ==
- Andrew Garfield as Sam
- Riley Keough as Sarah, Sam's new neighbor who mysteriously disappears
- Topher Grace as Bar Buddy, Sam's unnamed friend who helps him with an investigation surrounding the disappearance of Sarah
- Callie Hernandez as Millicent Sevence
- Don McManus as Final Man
- Jeremy Bobb as Songwriter
- Riki Lindhome as Actress
- Zosia Mamet as Troy
- Patrick Fischler as Comic Fan, creator of Under the Silver Lake zine who is obsessed with conspiracy theories
- Jimmi Simpson as Allen
- Grace Van Patten as Balloon Girl
- Bobbi Salvör Menuez (Note: Credited as India Menuez) as Shooting Star #1
- Wendy Vanden Heuvel as Topless Bird Woman
- Chris Gann as Jefferson Sevence
- Jessica Makinson as Mrs. Sevence
- Sky Elobar as Clerk
- Stephanie Moore as Brunette Roommate
- Sibongile Mlambo as Blonde Roommate
- Rex Linn as Manager
- Annabelle Dexter-Jones as Fannie
- Laura-Leigh as Mae
- Luke Baines as Jesus, leader and songwriter of the band Jesus and the Brides of Dracula
- Allie MacDonald as Meek Bride
- Victoria Bruno as Clara Bow Bride
- Lola Blanc as Reading Glasses Bride
- Silversun Pickups as Band
- Sydney Sweeney as Shooting Star #2
- Guy Nardulli as Door Guard
- David Yow as Homeless King
- Adam Bartley as Cop
- June Carryl as Sheriff
- Summer Bishil as EX/Billboard Girl

== Production ==
=== Casting and preproduction ===
In May 2016, David Robert Mitchell was announced to be writing and directing the film with Andrew Garfield and Dakota Johnson starring. Michael De Luca, Adele Romanski, Jake Weiner, and Chris Bender were also announced as producers. In October 2016, Riley Keough replaced Johnson and Topher Grace also joined the cast of the film. In November 2016, Zosia Mamet, Laura-Leigh, Jimmi Simpson, Patrick Fischler, Luke Baines, Callie Hernandez, Riki Lindhome and Don McManus joined the cast.

=== Filming ===
Principal photography began on October 31, 2016. It took place throughout Los Angeles, including the Silver Lake neighborhood, Silver Lake Reservoir, Griffith Observatory and The Last Bookstore.

=== Music ===
Rich Vreeland, known under the stage name Disasterpeace composed the score for Under the Silver Lake, continuing his collaboration with Mitchell after It Follows (2014). The soundtrack was released through Milan Records on June 22, 2018, worldwide, excluding the United States, where it released on April 19, 2019, the same day as the film.

== Release ==
In May 2016, A24 acquired US distribution rights to the film. Under the Silver Lake had its world premiere at the Cannes Film Festival on May 15, 2018. The first country it was released in nationwide was France on August 8, followed by Belgium on August 15.

The film was originally scheduled to be released in the United States on June 22, 2018, but on June 4 was pushed back to December 7, 2018. The theatrical release was then pushed back again to April 19, 2019, and three days later it was released on video on demand.

== Reception ==
=== Critical response ===
On the review aggregator website Rotten Tomatoes, the film holds an approval rating of 58% based on 159 reviews, with an average rating of 6/10. The website's critics consensus reads, "Under the Silver Lake hits its stride slightly more often than it stumbles, but it's hard not to admire – or be drawn in by – writer-director David Robert Mitchell's ambition." Metacritic, which uses a weighted average, assigned the film a score of 60 out of 100, based on 31 critics, indicating "mixed or average" reviews.

Joshua Rothkopf of Time Out gave the film a perfect five rating, calling it "Hypnotic, spiraling and deliriously high" and stating "the ambition of Under the Silver Lake is worth cherishing. It will either evaporate into nothingness or cohere into something you'll want to hug for being so wonderfully weird." Eric Kohn of IndieWire gave a positive review, calling it "a bizarre and outrageous drama grounded in the consistency of Garfield's astonishment at every turn. ... It's fascinating to watch Mitchell grasp for a bigger picture with the wild ambition of his scruffy protagonist."

Owen Gleiberman of Variety gave a positive review, calling it "a down-the-rabbit-hole movie, at once gripping and baffling, fueled by erotic passion and dread but also by the code-fixated opacity of conspiracy theory. The movie is impeccably shot and staged, with an insanely lush soundtrack that's like Bernard Herrmann-meets-Angelo Badalamenti-on-opioids." A.A. Dowd of The A.V. Club gave the film a B rating, stating "Mitchell is taking a big swing with his third feature, trying something not just new but also more unconventional, ambitious, and even potentially off-putting."

Emily Yoshida of Vulture stated about the film's message: "I kept coming back to the women in this extremely boy-driven movie—Mitchell suspects that they're all on one big conveyor belt to be chewed up and spit out by Hollywood, or if they're lucky, locked away in the dungeons of the rich and powerful. It's a rather pedestrian imagining for an otherwise admirably cuckoo film—you keep hoping for Mitchell to land on something weirder, more radical." Despite praising Garfield's performance and the film's originality, Bilge Ebiri of The Village Voice gave a negative review, stating: "If you're going to make a postmodern neo-noir sex-conspiracy... set in Los Angeles, it helps to have some personality, or at least a sense of style... Mitchell has interesting ideas, and his actors seem to be having fun, but that's not enough when the film itself lacks atmosphere, or tension, or emotional engagement."

=== Awards ===
In 2018, the film had positive reactions at the Neuchâtel International Fantastic Film Festival in Switzerland where it was awarded with the Denis-De-Rougemont Youth Award. At Sitges Film Festival, Under the Silver Lake was awarded with the Special Mention of the Jose Luis Guarner Critics' Award.

=== Cult following ===
While not initially a box-office success with audiences, Under the Silver Lake has garnered a cult following who are convinced that there are hidden meta-clues, codes and ciphers sprinkled throughout the film waiting to be discovered. These include references to the mystery surrounding the identity of the dog killer, geocoding systems, and even analysis of fireworks in the film, connecting the sound pattern they emit to Morse code. In certain scenes in the film there is graffiti that can be seen in the toilets and on a wall and which are coded with the Copiale cipher. The film's cryptography consultant was computer scientist Kevin Knight, who in 2011 co-created a program to translate the Copiale cipher.
