= Marcel the Shell with Shoes On (soundtrack) =

Marcel the Shell with Shoes On (Original Motion Picture Soundtrack)

Film score by Disasterpeace
- Released: June 24, 2022
- Recorded: 2021–2022
- Genre: Film score
- Length: 41:19
- Label: Lakeshore Records

Disasterpeace chronology
Solar Ash (2021)	Marcel the Shell with Shoes On (2022)	Bodies Bodies Bodies (2022)

Marcel the Shell with Shoes On (Original Motion Picture Soundtrack) is the score album composed by Disasterpeace to the 2021 film of the same name. The album was released on June 24, 2022 in digital formats by Lakeshore Records. It features 20 tracks from the original score, which plays in the film alongside several compositions from Hiroshi Yoshimura.

== Background ==
According to director Dean Fleischer Camp, as the titular character is so small, "there was a temptation to do the sort of Honey, I Shrunk the Kids soundscape where everything sounds massive." However, "it was hard to find sound effects that worked with this softer palate because with footsteps, for example, every footstep in every sound library on the planet is human and involves things like heavy boots. You can tell that's not coming from this little guy."

The film's soundtrack consisted of original compositions, ambient synth music, diegetic music, and natural sounds and noises made by characters. Disasterpeace, the stage name of Richard Vreeland, composed the film's score. Much of the music that served as a placeholder before Vreeland's score was implemented were compositions by Hiroshi Yoshimura (who died in 2003). Fleischer Camp listened to Yoshimura's albums, having recently been reissued by Light in the Attic Records, related that, "it was beautifully timed because Japanese copyrights are often hard to track down. Having Light In The Attic as a licensing partner made this process much easier. It was one of a few serendipitous confluences that worked to our advantage." Many of Yoshimura's tracks ended up in the final cut of the film.

The score consisted of synth work utilizing frequency modulation and physical modelling synthesis, which Vreeland describes as "good at creating sounds that can mimic natural sounds in simple and satisfying ways." He used pianos in conjunction with Nana Connie's story, as it called for a "more grounded, familiar, and traditional feeling" in tandem with sounds from Marcel's world – including falling spoons, shell, convoluted brass sounds, and prop cameos. He and Fleischer Camp aimed to "make the music somber through emotionally ambiguous music instead of explicit cueing. It's easy to see an emotion happening on screen and try to reflect that musically, but [the two] really tried to go against that grain as much as possible, to give the audience more room to draw their own conclusions."

Vreeland added that the film is heavily inspired by Japanese ambient music in the 1980s, and felt challenged by Fleischer Camp's directive to make the music "more emotionally ambiguous and less prescriptive," creating three times as much music as what ended up in the film. As Marcel… called for softer, enigmatic musical choices, in lieu of a defined theme tune, the composer and director honed in on an alternative motif to carry the story; Fleischer Camp expounded on "the idea of change [as] accompanied by the whistling sound [heard] at the end of the film where Marcel says, 'Oh, that's going through my shell.'" He remarked that this sounded like "Gregorian chants, like an ethereal vocal performance. It's just this very hollow wind sound [...] Throughout the film, when the inevitability of change rears its head, you hear a little bit of that whistling. You could take it literally and describe it as the winds of change."

== Track listing ==
No.	Title	Length
1.	"Marcel"	2:47
2.	"Tender Backhoe"	3:11
3.	"A Keen Sense"	2:53
4.	"A Broad Spectrum"	1:22
5.	"Popcorn"	0:58
6.	"Paper Lanterns"	1:41
7.	"The Mantle Plan"	2:05
8.	"Grain of Sand"	1:50
9.	"Paper Curtains"	1:40
10.	"Cucumber Butterflies"	1:49
11.	"Changing Seasons"	5:03
12.	"On Real Life"	2:24
13.	"Afresh Afresh"	1:47
14.	"Rings of Grain"	1:18
15.	"Everything Bagel"	1:20
16.	"Recent Buds"	1:24
17.	"A Family Reuniting"	1:20
18.	"A Family Reunion"	2:29
19.	"The Sound of Myself"	1:18
20.	"Be Odorant"	2:40
Total length:		41:19

== Additional music ==
Phil Collins' song "Take Me Home" is featured prominently in the first trailer. However, it was not included in the film, as Dean Fleischer Camp felt that the track didn't "belong in Marcel's world." "Pump Up the Jam" by Technotronic and "Whenever, Wherever" by Shakira accompany scenes as diegetic music. Richard Vreeland described that their inclusion concerns "nostalgia, trying to tap into something many of us knew from our 20s and teens. Marcel itself was slightly nostalgic, right? There is a longing in this film to reconnect with family, so all these things inform each other." Marcel also sings an a cappella version of The Eagles' "Peaceful Easy Feeling" after reuniting with his family.

== Reception ==
Courtney Howard of The A.V. Club wrote "Composer Disasterpeace's delicate undertones, along with some carefully curated soundtrack selections, complement narrative ebbs and flows." Betsy Sherman of The Arts Fuse wrote "Praise is due as well to the musical score by Disasterpeace". Caroline Siede of FOX 10 Phoenix wrote "The sound of Dean warmly laughing at his little friend's jokes becomes its own sort of soundtrack to complement the playful score by Disasterpeace". At the Phoenix Film Festival, where the film was screened, Jeff Mitchell of the Phoenix Film Critics Circle said "Disasterpeace's score, that sometimes resembles mystical beats from a harmonious yoga practice, and this concoction strikes deep-seated feelings, warm smiles, and tears". Monica Castillo of TheWrap said "Disasterpeace's music bounces along with Marcel's miniscule [sic] steps with an acute sense of joy and sadness." Morgan Rojas of Cinemacy wrote "The music in the film is also worth highlighting. Composer Rich Vreeland aka Disasterpeace creates delicate, charming moments. More kudos go to music supervisor Joe Rudge for including a handful of songs from Hiroshi Yoshimura."
