= Michael Gandolfini =

American actor (born 1999)

- Gandolfini in 2014
- Born: May 10, 1999 (age 27); New York City, U.S.
- Education: New York University
- Occupation: Actor
- Years active: 2011–present
- Parent: James Gandolfini (father)

Michael Gandolfini (born May 10, 1999) is an American actor. He made his major film debut in Ocean's 8 (2018) and appeared in The Many Saints of Newark (2021), in which he played the role of Tony Soprano, a character originally portrayed by his father, James Gandolfini, in the television series The Sopranos. He has since appeared in the Marvel Cinematic Universe series Daredevil: Born Again and the A24 film Warfare.

== Early life ==
Gandolfini was born on May 10, 1999, in New York City to the actor James Gandolfini and Marcy Wudarski. His father was of Italian descent, and his mother is of Polish and Slovak heritage. He has a younger half-sister from his father's second marriage. While he was a teenager, Gandolfini enjoyed performing, but his father advised against an acting career; he wanted him to pursue sports or "be a director. They have the power," he said.

== Career ==
After his father's death in June 2013, Michael Gandolfini decided to pursue acting. He enrolled at New York University after graduating from high school. After early auditions, he was cast in the HBO drama series The Deuce as Joey Dwyer. In 2019, he was cast in The Many Saints of Newark to play the young version of Tony Soprano, the role played by his father in the television series The Sopranos. Gandolfini had never watched the show. He described watching it while preparing for the role as an intense process. He was later cast in the Russo brothers' crime drama Cherry. In 2024, he was cast in Warfare, a war film written and directed by Ray Mendoza and Alex Garland. He has since been cast in Daredevil: Born Again as Daniel Blake.

== Personal life ==
He has been sober since 2017.

== Filmography ==
=== Film ===
Key
†	Denotes series that have not yet been released

Year	Title	Role	Notes
2011	Down the Shore	Kid on the ride	
2018	Ocean's 8	Busboy	
2021	Cherry	Cousin Joe	
2021	The Many Saints of Newark	Tony Soprano	
2022	The Independent	Justin	
2023	Cat Person	Peter	
2023	Landscape with Invisible Hand	Hunter Marsh	
2023	Beau Is Afraid	Beau's Son	
2024	Bob Marley: One Love	Howard Bloom	
2025	Warfare	Lt. McDonald	
2027	Untitled Daniels film †	TBA	Filming
TBA	They Follow †	TBA	Post-production

=== Television ===
Key
†	Denotes series that have not yet been released

Year	Title	Role	Notes
2018–2019	The Deuce	Joey Dwyer	Recurring role, 10 episodes
2020	Acting for a Cause	Benvolio	Episode: "Romeo and Juliet"
2022	The Offer	Andy Calhoun	Episode: "A Stand Up Guy"
2023	Extrapolations	Rowan Chopin	Episode: "2059 Part I: Face of God"
2025–2026	Daredevil: Born Again	Daniel Blake	Main role, 15 episodes
