= It Follows =

2014 film by David Robert Mitchell

- Theatrical release poster
- Directed by: David Robert Mitchell
- Written by: David Robert Mitchell
- Produced by: Rebecca Green; Laura D. Smith; David Robert Mitchell; David Kaplan; Erik Rommesmo
- Starring: Maika Monroe; Keir Gilchrist; Daniel Zovatto; Jake Weary; Olivia Luccardi; Lili Sepe
- Cinematography: Mike Gioulakis
- Edited by: Julio C. Perez IV
- Music by: Disasterpeace
- Production companies: Northern Lights Films; Animal Kingdom; Two Flints
- Distributed by: RADiUS-TWC
- Release dates: May 17, 2014 (Cannes); March 13, 2015 (United States)
- Running time: 100 minutes
- Country: United States
- Language: English
- Budget: $1.3 million
- Box office: $23.3 million

It Follows is a 2014 American supernatural psychological horror film written and directed by David Robert Mitchell. It stars Maika Monroe as a young woman who is pursued by a supernatural entity. Keir Gilchrist, Daniel Zovatto, Jake Weary, Olivia Luccardi, and Lili Sepe appear in supporting roles. It Follows debuted at the 2014 Cannes Film Festival and was later purchased by Radius-TWC for distribution. After a successful limited release, the film had a wide release two weeks later on March 27, 2015.

It Follows received acclaim from critics, who praised its originality, direction, performances, cinematography, and score. It grossed $23.3 million worldwide against a $1.3 million budget. It has since achieved a cult following, with many critics citing it as a modern horror classic and one of the best horror films of the 2010s. In October 2023, a sequel entitled They Follow was announced to be in development, before filming began in July 2026.

== Plot ==
Annie Marshall runs out of her house but denies to onlookers that she needs help. She gets into her car and drives away. That night, she sits alone on a beach, and when her parents call, she tells them she loves them. In the morning, her mutilated corpse remains on the beach.

Carefree college student Jay Height goes to a movie with her boyfriend Hugh. Hugh points out a girl in a yellow dress, whom Jay says she cannot see. Unnerved, Hugh asks that they leave. Later, Hugh and Jay have sex for the first time in his car, after which he incapacitates her with chloroform.

Jay wakes up tied to a wheelchair, where Hugh explains that he has passed something to her through intercourse — she will be pursued by an entity that only she (and the previously afflicted) can see, which can take the appearance of any person. It moves at a walking pace, but it always knows where she is and will be approaching at all times. If it catches Jay, it will kill her and pursue the previous person to have passed it on. Hugh waits until a naked woman slowly approaches them to prove Jay is being followed, then urges her to have sex with someone else soon. He drives Jay home and flees. The next day, the police cannot find the naked woman or Hugh, who was living under a false identity.

At school, Jay sees an old woman walking towards her, but no one else seems to notice; Jay flees the campus. Her sister Kelly and longtime friends Paul and Yara spend the night at Jay's house. Someone smashes a window; Jay investigates and sees a disheveled, urinating, half-naked woman walking toward her, and runs upstairs to the others, who cannot see the entity. When a tall man enters the bedroom, Jay flees the house through her balcony. With the help of their neighbor Greg, the group discovers Hugh's real name, Jeff Redmond, and finds his home. Jeff explains that the entity began pursuing him after a one-night stand, and reiterates that the only option is to sleep with someone else, imploring Jay to do the same. He recommends that Jay drive to a distant location to buy herself time to think.

Greg drives Jay, Kelly, Yara, and Paul to his family's lake house. The next day on the lakefront, the entity arrives in the form of Yara and attacks Jay from behind; the others cannot see it directly, but all except Greg (who has momentarily stepped away to urinate) witness Jay's hair being grabbed by an invisible force and Paul being struck and flung across the beach. Jay shoots the entity with a pistol; it collapses but is only momentarily incapacitated. Jay flees in Greg's car and crashes, then wakes up in a hospital with a broken arm. To buy herself time, Jay has sex with Greg in the hospital. Greg denies the entity's existence despite Jay's friends' insistence.

Later, Jay sees the entity, in the form of Greg, walking towards Greg's house. It smashes a window and enters. Jay runs into the house and finds the entity, in the form of Greg's half-naked mother, attacking and killing him. Jay flees by car and spends the night outdoors. On a beach, Jay sees three young men on a boat. She partially undresses and walks into the water. (Note: It is left ambiguous whether or not Jay chose to have sex with the men on the boat.) Back home, Paul, willing to take the risk, asks Jay to pass it on to him, but she refuses.

The group plans a last-ditch effort to kill the entity by luring it into a swimming pool and dropping electrical devices into the water. Jay waits in the pool until the entity arrives, appearing as her father. Instead of entering the pool, it throws the devices at her. Firing at an invisible target, Paul accidentally wounds Yara but shoots the entity twice before it falls into the pool. As it pulls Jay underwater, Paul shoots it again, and Jay escapes as it sinks to the bottom. When Paul asks if it is dead, Jay approaches the pool and silently watches as it fills with blood.

Back at Jay's house, Jay and Paul have sex. Paul drives through town, passing sex workers. Yara recovers at a hospital. Later, Jay and Paul walk down the street holding hands, while a figure in the distance walks behind them.

== Cast ==
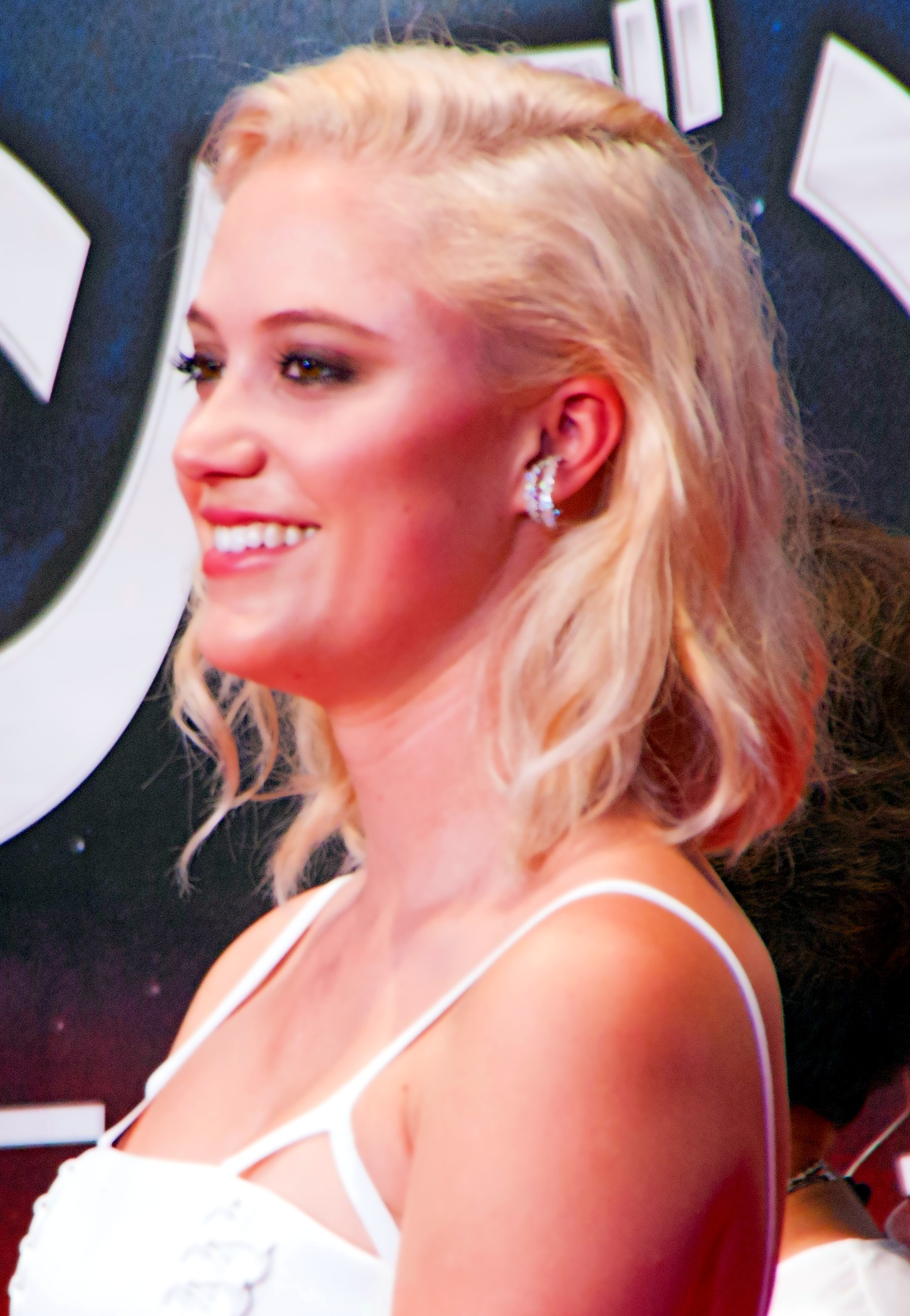
Lead actress Maika Monroe

- Maika Monroe as Jaime "Jay" Height, a young woman targeted by the entity
- Keir Gilchrist as Paul Bolduan, a friend of Jay, Kelly, and Yara
- Olivia Luccardi as Yara Davis, Kelly's friend
- Lili Sepe as Kelly Height, Jay's younger sister
- Daniel Zovatto as Greg Hannigan, Jay and Kelly's neighbor
- Jake Weary as Hugh / Jeff Redmond, Jay's former boyfriend and a target of the entity
- Bailey Spry as Annie Marshall, one of the entity's victims
- Debbie Williams as Mrs. Height, Jay and Kelly's mother
- Ruby Harris as Mrs. Redmond, Jeff's mother

Featured as forms of the entity are Ingrid Mortimer, Alexyss Spradlin, Mike Lanier, and Don Hails. Leisa Pulido also portrays the entity while it is in the form of Greg's mother, and Ele Bardha portrays it in the form of Jay's father.

== Production ==
=== Development ===
Writer and director David Robert Mitchell conceived the film based on recurring dreams he had in his youth about being followed: "I didn't use those images for the film, but the basic idea and the feeling I used. From what I understand, it's an anxiety dream. Whatever I was going through at that time, my parents divorced when I was around that age, so I imagine it was something to do with that." The role that sexual transmission plays came later, from Mitchell's desire for something that could transfer between people.

Mitchell started writing the film in 2011 while working on a separate film he intended to be his second feature film; however, Mitchell struggled with this would-be second feature and made It Follows as his next film instead. Mitchell realized that the concept he was working on was tough to describe and thus refused to discuss the plot when asked what he was working on, reasoning later, "When you say it out loud, it sounds like the worst thing ever."

=== Filming ===
The film was shot in late 2013 in Detroit, Michigan. Exteriors of an abandoned psychiatric hospital were used for the scene in which Jeff incapacitates Jay before showing her the entity, while interiors were shot at the abandoned Packard Automotive Plant. The filmmakers had planned to shoot the scene at an alternate location, but were unable to after a murder was committed there and it became an active crime scene.

Mitchell used wide-angle lenses when filming to give the film an expansive look, and cited the works of George A. Romero and John Carpenter as influences on the film's compositions and visual aesthetic. The film's monster, shot composition and overall aesthetic were influenced by the work of contemporary photographer Gregory Crewdson. Director of photography Mike Gioulakis said: "We're both big fans of the still photographer Gregory Crewdson and David had him in his look book from day one. [Crewdson's] photographs have the same kind of surreal suburban imagery that we wanted for It Follows."

=== Music ===
The score was composed by Rich Vreeland, better known as Disasterpeace. It was released on February 2, 2015, via Editions Milan Music with a digital booklet. The digital version of the album went on sale March 10.

== Release ==
It Follows premiered at the 67th Cannes Film Festival on May 17, 2014. It was released theatrically in France on February 4, 2015, and in the United Kingdom on February 27, 2015. It was given a limited release in the United States on March 13, 2015. and a wide release on March 27, 2015. in 1,200 theaters. That same day, the film received a limited release in Canada by Mongrel Media.

=== Home media ===
It Follows was released on DVD and Blu-ray on July 14, 2015, by Starz/Anchor Bay. A steelbook Blu-ray edition with alternate artwork was released on April 10, 2016.

In the United Kingdom, Second Sight Films issued 4K UHD Blu-ray and Blu-ray editions with newly commissioned cast and crew interviews and audio commentaries. In North America, Lionsgate released the film on 4K UHD Blu-ray in a limited edition steelbook as part of their "Lionsgate Limited" series on August 12, 2025.

== Reception ==
=== Box office ===
It Follows earned $163,453 in its opening weekend from four theaters at an average of $40,863 per theater, making it the best limited opening for a film released in the United States and Canada in 2015. The film made its international debut in the United Kingdom on February 27, 2015, where it earned $573,290 (£371,142) on 190 screens for the #8 position. The following week, the film dropped two spots to #10 with a weekend gross of $346,005 (£229,927) from 240 screens. The film had a domestic gross of $14.7 million and an international gross of $8.6 million for a worldwide total of $23.3 million.

=== Critical response ===
It Follows received critical acclaim. On review aggregator website Rotten Tomatoes, it holds a 95% approval rating and an average rating of 8.10/10, based on 272 reviews. The critical consensus states: "Smart, original and, above all, terrifying, It Follows is the rare modern horror film that works on multiple levels—and leaves a lingering sting." On review aggregator website Metacritic, the film has an average rating of 83 out of 100, based on 37 critics, indicating "universal acclaim". On Rotten Tomatoes' aggregation, it was ranked as the sixth-most-praised film of the year, and the ninth-most-praised horror film of the 2010s. Peter Debruge of Variety gave an overall positive review, saying: "Starting off strong before losing its way in the end, this stylish, suspenseful chiller should significantly broaden Mitchell's audience without disappointing his early supporters in the slightest."

David Rooney of The Hollywood Reporter said, "Creepy, suspenseful and sustained, this skillfully made lo-fi horror movie plays knowingly with genre tropes and yet never winks at the audience, giving it a refreshing face-value earnestness that makes it all the more gripping." Tim Robey of The Daily Telegraph gave the film five out of five stars and said, "With its marvellously suggestive title and thought-provoking exploration of sex, this indie chiller is a contemporary horror fan's dream come true."

Ignatiy Vishnevetsky of The A.V. Club said, "Despite all the fun-to-unpack ideas swirling around Mitchell's premise, this is first and foremost a showcase for his considerable talents as a widescreen visual stylist, which are most apparent in the movie's deftly choreographed, virtuoso 360° pans." Mike Pereira of Bloody Disgusting described the film as a "creepy, mesmerizing exercise in minimalist horror" and labeled it as "a classical horror masterpiece." Michael Nordine of Vice named It Follows as "the best horror film in years", and critic Mark Frauenfelder called it "the best horror film in over a decade".

In 2025, it was one of the films voted for the "Readers' Choice" edition of The New York Times' list of "The 100 Best Movies of the 21st Century," finishing at number 299. In July 2025, The Hollywood Reporter ranked the film at number 19 on its list of the "25 Best Horror Movies of the 21st Century."

== Analysis ==
It Follows has sparked numerous interpretations from film critics in regard to the source of "it" and the film's symbolism. Critics have interpreted the film as a parable about HIV/AIDS, other sexually transmitted infections and the social perceptions thereof; the sexual revolution; "primal anxieties" about intimacy; and post-Great Recession economic anxiety.

Director Mitchell stated: "I'm not personally that interested in where 'it' comes from. To me, it's dream logic in the sense that they're in a nightmare, and when you're in a nightmare there's no solving the nightmare. Even if you try to solve it." Mitchell said that while Jay "opens herself up to danger through sex, the one way in which she can free herself from that danger... We're all here for a limited amount of time and we can't escape our mortality... but love and sex are two ways in which we can at least temporarily push death away."

== Sequel ==
On October 30, 2023, it was announced that a sequel, titled They Follow, was in pre-production with Mitchell and star Monroe returning. Neon, Quinn's second film studio, would produce and distribute the film domestically. In June 2024, Monroe said principal photography would begin in early 2025, and that it would be set ten years after It Follows. In October 2025, Monroe announced that production was delayed due to scheduling conflicts. In July 2026, it was confirmed it had started filming, with Justine Lupe, Jackie Earle Haley, Anna Mirodin, Melora Walters, Michael Gandolfini, Jayne Taini, Tom Pecinka, Ben Krieger, Jan Hoag, Naomi Ackie, and Natalie Shinnick being new additions to the cast.

== In popular culture ==
In April 2015, Funny or Die hosted a spoof of It Follows titled What Follows After Watching It Follows, produced by Whelmed Productions and starring Danielle Shapira, Matt Sweeney, and Wes Schlagenhauf, receiving a generally negative critical reception.

In October 2015, at the beginning of an episode of The Good Wife, after being threatened by a political rival that "I will destroy you and everything you hold dear," campaign manager Eli Gold responds, "Have you seen the movie It Follows?" Then continues, "Modern classic [...] I just thought you'd like it." Later in the episode, when the rival asks for more information about the movie, his assistant Nora explains, "It's one of Mr. Gold's favorites." She explains, "It's about a girl who goes crazy 'cause this thing, this being, constantly follows her. And if it catches her, it'll kill her. So she can never feel safe."

In the 2016 novel Desolation by Derek Landy, the premise which follows individuals as they travel a titular "demon road" on which exists all manner of supernatural beings from whom all horror fiction antagonist creators were subconsciously inspired by to create (primarily the villains of the works of Stephen King and 1980s slasher film villains, as well as "real" versions of the Scooby-Doo gang), "It" is featured as a parody composite character of the "It" of It Follows and the "It" of the self-titled novel and its adaptations, depicted as a slow-moving demonic clown who can only be seen by teenagers and children below the age of 18, whom the protagonists Amber and Milo encounter over the course of one of several semi-anthological subplots.

The sixth-season The Amazing World of Gumball episode "The Ghouls" features an It Follows–inspired subplot in which Rocky is pursued by a "Walking Shadow" inspired by the film's "IT", whom Rocky ultimately traps on a treadmill at the gym.

The 2022 premiere of the fourth and final season of the FX satirical surrealist comedy-drama series Atlanta, entitled "The Most Atlanta", features an It Follows–inspired subplot in which the holder of an air fryer is constantly pursued by a woman on a slow-moving mobility scooter for days (also inspired by a real-life woman in a wheelchair who had confronted looters with a knife during George Floyd protests in Minneapolis).

== Sources ==
- Lizza, Katherine (2020). "It Follows and the Uncertainties of the Middle Class". Dark Forces at Work: Essays on Social Dynamics and Cinematic Horrors. Lanham, Maryland: Lexington Books. pp. 293–304. ISBN 978-1-978-75184-2.
