= David Robert Mitchell =

American filmmaker (born 1974)

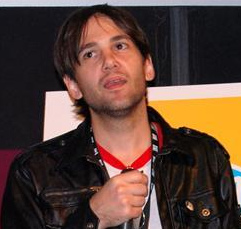
- Mitchell in 2010
- Born: October 19, 1974 (age 51); Clawson, Michigan, U.S.
- Education: Florida State University
- Years active: 2002–present
- Notable credit: It Follows (2014)

David Robert Mitchell (born October 19, 1974) is an American filmmaker. He received significant recognition as a director after completing his second feature, the critically acclaimed horror film It Follows (2014).

== Early life and education ==
Mitchell was born in Clawson, Michigan. He attended Wayne State University in Detroit, MI. He graduated from Florida State University College of Motion Picture Arts with a Master of Fine Arts degree in production.

== Career ==
Mitchell's first full-length film was the coming-of-age drama The Myth of the American Sleepover (2010). Adele Romanski, a friend of Mitchell's from film school, served as one of the producers. In an interview, Mitchell said that the film cost about $50,000.

Four years later, he directed the supernatural horror film It Follows. The film was acclaimed by critics and was a remarkable commercial success considering its low, independent film budget.

Mitchell served as a jury member in the Critics' Week section of the 2016 Cannes Film Festival.

In 2018, he directed Under the Silver Lake, a postmodern noir comedy-drama film set in Los Angeles and starring Andrew Garfield.

In October 2023, it was announced that a sequel, titled They Follow, was in development with Mitchell returning to write and direct, and Maika Monroe returning to star. Neon would produce and distribute the film domestically. Filming began in July 2026.

== Filmography ==
Short film

Year	Title	Director	Writer	Producer
2001	Kiss	No	No	Yes
2002	Virgin	Yes	Yes	No

Feature film

Year	Title	Director	Writer	Producer
2010	The Myth of the American Sleepover	Yes	Yes	No
2014	It Follows	Yes	Yes	Yes
2018	Under the Silver Lake	Yes	Yes	Yes
2026	The End of Oak Street	Yes	Yes	Yes
TBA	They Follow †	Yes	Yes	Yes
