= Daredevil season 3 =

Daredevil
- Season 3
- Promotional poster
- Showrunner: Erik Oleson
- Starring: Charlie Cox; Deborah Ann Woll; Elden Henson; Joanne Whalley; Jay Ali; Wilson Bethel; Stephen Rider; Vincent D'Onofrio
- No. of episodes: 13

Release
- Original network: Netflix
- Original release: October 19, 2018

Season chronology
- ← Previous; Season 2 Next → Season 4

The third and final season of the American streaming television series Daredevil, which is based on the Marvel Comics character of the same name, follows Matt Murdock / Daredevil, a blind lawyer-by-day who fights crime at night. When Wilson Fisk is released from prison, Murdock must decide between hiding from the world or embracing his life as a hero vigilante. The season is set in the Marvel Cinematic Universe (MCU), sharing continuity with the films and other television series of the franchise, and is set after the events of the miniseries The Defenders (2017). It was produced by Marvel Television in association with ABC Studios, with Erik Oleson serving as showrunner and series creator Drew Goddard acting as a consultant.

Charlie Cox stars as Murdock, and Vincent D'Onofrio portrays Fisk, with Deborah Ann Woll, Elden Henson, and Stephen Rider also returning from previous seasons; Joanne Whalley, Jay Ali, and Wilson Bethel join them. Former series regular Ayelet Zurer also returns in a guest role. The season was ordered in July 2016, with Oleson announced as the new showrunner for the season in October 2017. Filming began the following month and ended by June 2018, with the season adapting elements from the "Born Again" comic storyline.

The 13-episode season was released on October 19, 2018. Netflix canceled the series on November 29, 2018. Daredevil: Born Again, a revival series produced by Marvel Studios for Disney+, was announced in July 2022.

== Episodes ==
No. overall	No. in season	Title	Directed by	Written by	Original release date
27	1	"Resurrection"	Marc Jobst	Erik Oleson	October 19, 2018
After surviving the collapse of a building, (Note: As depicted in the miniseries The Defenders (2017)) a seriously injured Matt Murdock washes out of the New York City sewer system. A taxi driver finds Matt and gets him to Father Paul Lantom, who entrusts Matt to the care of Sister Maggie at the Saint Agnes Orphanage, where Matt was raised. As he slowly recovers, Matt has a crisis of faith and decides that he would rather continue fighting as Daredevil than return to his civilian life, after which he begins training to fight again. Donning his original vigilante gear, he stops a kidnapping one night and is badly beaten. Matt's friends, Karen Page (now a reporter for the New York Bulletin) and Foggy Nelson, start to lose hope that he may still be alive. In prison, criminal Wilson Fisk decides to make a deal with the FBI to protect his fiancée Vanessa Marianna, who can be charged as an accessory to his crimes. The case is assigned to Special Agent Rahul "Ray" Nadeem, who is struggling with being unable to receive a promotion due to financial troubles after he paid for his sister-in-law's cancer treatment.
28	2	"Please"	Lukas Ettlin	Jim Dunn	October 19, 2018
Fisk's intel leads to the arrest of the elusive Albanian syndicate's leaders, and Nadeem convinces his superiors to let him continue to work with Fisk despite his financial troubles making him a target for bribery. News of Fisk's cooperation with the FBI spreads fast, and in retaliation he is attacked in prison by a fellow inmate. Nadeem agrees to move Fisk out of prison and into home detention, but their convoy is attacked by the Albanians on the way, and most of the FBI agents are killed. Fisk is saved by Special Agent Benjamin "Dex" Poindexter, who has incredibly accurate shooting skills and executes some of the attackers even after they surrender. Matt tracks down the attempted kidnappers and beats them, leaving them to be arrested. Karen is assigned to report on the attempted kidnapping, which involved the well-known Neda Kazemi; after hearing about the death of Karen's brother Kevin, Neda opens up to Karen about the attack and leads Karen to believe that Matt is still alive, but Foggy, who is considering leaving the law to help his brother Theo run the family business, is skeptical of this.
29	3	"No Good Deed"	Jennifer Getzinger	Sonay Hoffman	October 19, 2018
The FBI house Fisk in the penthouse suite of a hotel they use as a safehouse. News of his release from prison becomes public, prompting protests outside of the hotel and interest from reporters, including Karen, who learns that the hotel had belonged to Neda's father Rostom, who sold it to a company represented by Fisk's lawyer Benjamin Donovan. Foggy goes to District Attorney Blake Tower to offer his help in returning Fisk to prison, but Tower is reluctant to go against the wishes of the FBI, especially since he is running for re-election. Matt investigates the hotel and begins to hallucinate Fisk as a "devil on his shoulder". Matt interrogates Donovan and learns of the situation with Vanessa. He vows to stop Fisk and return him to prison, revealing to Foggy that he is alive but only to warn him and Karen to stay away from Fisk. During a routine psychological evaluation to determine his fitness for duty, Dex talks about the emotional support that he receives from his girlfriend Julie Barnes. However, she later appears to be someone that he is stalking.
30	4	"Blindsided"	Alex García López	Lewaa Nasserdeen	October 19, 2018
Dex's superiors investigate his killing of the two Albanians during the transit attack, which he claims was in self-defense. Despite the fact that Fisk saw him kill them in cold blood, he conceals this by falsely corroborating Dex's rationale to the FBI. Foggy, unhappy with Matt's demands, tells Karen that Matt is alive and then is convinced by his girlfriend Marci Stahl to run for district attorney against Tower in order to ensure that Fisk is brought to justice. Foggy gains the support of the New York Police Department, who view Fisk as a cop killer. Karen continues her investigation and finds that prison convict Felix Manning was involved in the company that bought the hotel in which the FBI is housing Fisk. Matt impersonates Foggy to infiltrate the prison housing Jasper Evans, whom he learns was paid by Fisk to attack Fisk in order to convince the FBI to move him. With the Albanians' help, Matt fights off inmates and guards working for Fisk and escapes the prison but is driven off a dock by an unknown taxi driver.
31	5	"The Perfect Game"	Julian Holmes	Tonya Kong	October 19, 2018
When Fisk learns that Matt survived the submerged taxi, he tells the FBI that he has a criminal fixer named Matt Murdock. Karen confronts Fisk's actual fixer, Manning, but he threatens her with his knowledge of her family, including her brother's death. Nadeem questions both Karen and Foggy about Matt, and both try to direct him towards Fisk and his crimes. Fisk reviews a file from Manning on Dex and learns that he used his skillful aim to kill his baseball coach as a child. He was taught to be more empathetic through therapy as he grew up, but he feigned this to conceal his psychopathic tendencies. In one incident when he worked for a suicide prevention hotline, he encouraged a caller to kill someone else rather than himself. It was there that he met and fell in love with Julie, whom he now finds working at the hotel. He accidentally reveals to her that he has been stalking her. Fisk sees the potential for Dex to become the new villain that the public can focus on in order to misdirect attention from himself. Karen reveals to Foggy that she killed James Wesley.
32	6	"The Devil You Know"	Stephen Surjik	Dylan Gallagher	October 19, 2018
Foggy assures Karen that she is still a good person after killing Wesley in self-defense. Dex confronts Fisk, who confirms that he was behind Julie's hiring at the hotel and that he had intended to show Dex that life with Julie was not going to work since she would never understand Dex like Fisk does, in light of his own boyhood murder of his father. Matt visits Karen to ask for her help in finding Evans and offers to testify against Fisk. Foggy arranges a meeting between a newly promoted Nadeem and Karen at the New York Bulletin, where she will interview Evans about Fisk's plans. In exchange for Nadeem considering Evans' testimony, Matt agrees to turn himself in to the FBI in order to clear his name. Distraught over Julie, Dex considers committing suicide but is interrupted by Fisk, who proposes an alternative. Dex instead goes to the New York Bulletin dressed as Daredevil, fights off Matt, and kills Evans before he can talk. Dex is then confronted by the FBI, including Nadeem, and dispatches the agents before escaping, leading the FBI to believe that Daredevil assaulted them.
33	7	"Aftermath"	Toa Fraser	Sarah Streicher	October 19, 2018
Daredevil is attacked by the public and media, and Karen is unable to convince Nadeem that this was not the true Daredevil or that Fisk was behind the attack. When she tries to do the same with her boss Mitchell Ellison, he orders her to reveal who Daredevil is or quit. Karen later asks her father Paxton if she could go spend some time at home with him, but he says the timing isn't great. Foggy believes that he has worked out what Fisk is planning. Matt, angry that he put his friends in harm's way and worried about the skill of the pretend Daredevil, visits Melvin Potter, the man who created the Daredevil suit. Potter confirms that Fisk forced him to create a copy of the suit and reveals that the pretender was an FBI agent. Following Fisk's orders, Potter then tries to frame Matt as the Daredevil who attacked the New York Bulletin, but Matt manages to escape the arriving FBI agents. After investigating Evans, Nadeem begins to believe that Fisk is manipulating them but has no proof of this. At home, he is confronted by Matt who explains that the Daredevil attacker was a pretender and an FBI agent.
34	8	"Upstairs/Downstairs"	Alex Zakrzewski	Dara Resnik	October 19, 2018
Nadeem realizes that Dex is the attacker. Dex attempts to reconcile with Julie, believing that he needs her to replace his therapist who died when he was younger. She reluctantly agrees to start talking with him, but Fisk later has her killed. Believing that Julie has abandoned him, Dex continues to mentally deteriorate. Matt and Nadeem break into Dex's apartment but cannot find proof that he was the attacker, only some recordings of his therapy sessions which reveal his psychopathic tendencies. Dex arrives home and catches them, injuring Nadeem but they manage to escape. Foggy thinks that he can prove Fisk is still working as a criminal and that this will get him sent back to prison. He decides to raise these points in a debate with Tower and let Karen write about it, but instead, she goes to confront Fisk. She reveals that she knows he killed his father, and that she had killed Wesley, while accidentally confirming that Matt is Daredevil. Matt later overhears Sister Maggie praying about the fact that she is his mother.
35	9	"Revelations"	Jennifer Lynch	Erik Oleson & Sam Ernst	October 19, 2018
Matt struggles with the fact that both Maggie and Lantom hid the truth from him, and takes shelter at an abandoned Fogwell's Gym. Manning threatens Foggy's family unless he publicly apologizes for speaking out against Fisk at the debate. Karen decides to run from Fisk, and Maggie offers to help hide her. Nadeem tells his superiors, Special Agent in Charge Tammy Hattley and Supervisory Special Agent Winn, about the FBI conspiracy involving Fisk and Dex. In a turn of events, Hattley kills Winn with Nadeem's gun, revealing that she works for Fisk. She then blackmails him into working for Fisk with help from Manning, and reveals that Fisk was behind the need for Nadeem to help pay for his sister-in-law's treatment. Fisk has Nadeem and Dex arrest several gang leaders across New York and bring them to a restaurant where Fisk offers to protect them from FBI charges in exchange for payment. Fisk coerces Nadeem into luring Matt to the meeting, but Matt knows it is a trap and instead goes to the hotel to wait for Fisk. While there, he overhears FBI agents loyal to Fisk who have discovered that Karen is hiding at Clinton Church.
36	10	"Karen"	Alex García López	Tamara Becher-Wilkinson	October 19, 2018
In flashback, Karen postpones going to college because she knows that her father and brother Kevin would not be able to run their family diner following her mother's death from cancer. She grows bored of her small-town life, and descends into using and selling drugs with her boyfriend Todd. One day, Kevin reveals to Karen that he has re-enrolled her in college, which Paxton celebrates with a family dinner, but this leads to an argument, and Karen runs off with Todd. After getting drunk and high together, they return to the travel trailer where Todd lives to find that Kevin is burning it down. Todd attacks Kevin, and Karen injures Todd with his own gun to stop him. She quickly drives Kevin away, but crashes, and Kevin dies. The local sheriff covers up Karen's involvement, and Paxton asks her to leave. In the present, Karen attends a service at Clinton Church when Dex, dressed as Daredevil, arrives and kills Lantom, intending to then kill Karen. Choosing between saving Karen and lying in wait for Fisk, Matt races to the church, where he confronts Dex, who badly beats Matt before Karen knocks Dex off a second-story balcony, after which he escapes.
37	11	"Reunion"	Jet Wilkinson	Jim Dunn & Dara Resnik	October 19, 2018
Dex has Nadeem take control of the church crime scene, and the FBI searches for Matt and Karen. They remain hidden with Maggie's help. The Justice Department drops all charges against Fisk, who announces his freedom to the public with a speech that proclaims Daredevil as the public's enemy. With Vanessa on her way back to New York City, Fisk goes to retrieve the painting she gave him when they first met; it is in the possession of Esther Falb, a Holocaust survivor whose family were the original owners of the painting. Fisk decides to let her keep it. Foggy considers reading a statement apologizing to Fisk, until he is called by Matt to help them escape the church: Foggy goes and surrenders Karen to the NYPD, which Nadeem allows, distracting the FBI long enough for Matt to escape as well. Matt, Foggy, and Karen plan their next moves against Fisk and know they will need help. Later, Nadeem and his family are attacked by FBI agents loyal to Fisk. Matt helps Nadeem fight them off, and reveals his identity to him.
38	12	"One Last Shot"	Phil Abraham	Sam Ernst	October 19, 2018
Fisk is reunited with Vanessa, who convinces Fisk to let her into the criminal side of his life. Without asking Fisk, Dex retrieves the painting from Falb after murdering her and Vanessa notices some of her blood on the frame. Matt agrees to carry out Foggy's plan—working together as lawyers as they once had, they take Nadeem on as a client and arrange with Tower to have Nadeem testify against Fisk in front of a grand jury. Foggy also offers to withdraw from the race for district attorney, and they get Nadeem's family to safety. Meanwhile, Karen calls a press conference to announce what Nadeem is doing so the public is aware given that his testimony would be sealed. Matt and Foggy celebrate after the hearing, with Foggy hinting that he would like to work with Matt once again. However, Fisk controls the jury, and so the hearing has no effect. Nadeem is convinced that Fisk cannot be stopped and returns to his home. Fisk decides it would be better not to kill Nadeem now that he is a public figure, but Vanessa convinces him otherwise. They send Dex, who kills Nadeem.
39	13	"A New Napkin"	Sam Miller	Erik Oleson	October 19, 2018
With Foggy's plan foiled, Matt returns to his own and intends to kill Fisk. He kidnaps and interrogates Manning, learning that Vanessa ordered Nadeem's death and Fisk ordered Julie's. Foggy meets with Nadeem's wife, Seema, to whom he sent a video message that serves as his dying declaration, detailing all of Fisk's crimes and clearing Daredevil's name. Matt tells Dex about Julie's death, which Dex investigates and finds her body. Fisk and Vanessa get married at the hotel, but their reception is interrupted when Karen distributes Nadeem's video on social media, followed by the arrival of Dex, who attacks Fisk and Vanessa. Matt soon joins to start a three-way fight inside Fisk's penthouse. Fisk defeats Dex, leaving him paralyzed, while Matt overpowers and beats Fisk but is ultimately unwilling to murder him. Fisk agrees to return to prison and leave Karen and Foggy alone if Matt does not reveal Vanessa's involvement in Nadeem's death. With Fisk arrested, a funeral is held for Lantom. Foggy suggests to Matt and Karen that they all start working together again as the law firm Nelson, Murdock & Page. Dex later goes through experimental surgery to fix his spine.

== Cast and characters ==
=== Main ===
- Charlie Cox as Matt Murdock / Daredevil
- Deborah Ann Woll as Karen Page
- Elden Henson as Franklin "Foggy" Nelson
- Joanne Whalley as Maggie Grace
- Jay Ali as Rahul "Ray" Nadeem
- Wilson Bethel as Benjamin "Dex" Poindexter
- Stephen Rider as Blake Tower
- Vincent D'Onofrio as Wilson Fisk / Kingpin

=== Recurring ===
- Peter McRobbie as Paul Lantom
- Danny Johnson as Benjamin Donovan
- Stephen Rowe as Nicholas Lee
- Kate Udall as Tammy Hattley
- Sunita Deshpande as Seema Nadeem
- Noah Huq as Sami Nadeem
- Geoffrey Cantor as Mitchell Ellison
- Peter Halpin as Theo Nelson
- Amy Rutberg as Marci Stahl
- Holly Cinnamon as Julie Barnes
- Royce Johnson as Brett Mahoney
- Joe Jones as Felix Manning
- Kelly McAndrews as Mrs. Shelby

=== Notable guests ===
- Matt Gerald as Melvin Potter
- John Patrick Hayden as Jack Murdock
- Annabella Sciorra as Rosalie Carbone
- Ron Simons as Strieber
- Ayelet Zurer as Vanessa Marianna-Fisk

== Production ==
=== Development ===
At the 2016 San Diego Comic-Con, Marvel and Netflix revealed the series had been renewed for a third season, with the expectation that Doug Petrie and Marco Ramirez would return as showrunners from the second season. In October 2017, it was announced that Erik Oleson would replace Petrie and Ramirez as showrunner for the season. The season had yet to be scheduled for release by the end of July 2018, and television critics wondered whether the quality of the season was to blame on this. Netflix VP Cindy Holland responded that the scheduling of the various Marvel Netflix series, especially the crossover miniseries The Defenders which required cast members from all of the series to come together, was to blame for the delay, and that the company had no issue with the quality of the season; on the contrary, Holland described the season as "fantastic" and felt it was a "real return to form" for the series.

=== Writing ===
The ending of the miniseries The Defenders, which sees Matt Murdock waking up in a convent surrounded by nuns after being presumed dead, implied elements of the season would be inspired by the "Born Again" story arc. Charlie Cox was excited to adapt "Born Again", calling it "an amazing story" and that the implications of the story on the season "would be very exciting". He cautioned, however, that it would not be a "page-for-page" adaptation, "because if you do [that], then you become a foregone conclusion. There may be elements from "Born Again", but I'm sure there will be elements that are unfamiliar and surprising and different in order for the show to be compelling to fans who know the comics very well." Oleson crafted an original story for the season, taking "pieces of some of my favorite comic book runs, that told a larger story". When pitching his ideas to Marvel, Oleson expected "more pushback" from them, but said "Marvel was incredibly excited about the storyline" and gave him "complete freedom". Executive producer Jeph Loeb did note that despite this apparent freedom, Oleson was still required to deal with Murdock's death in The Defenders which was part of "a fairly good idea as to what [Marvel] wanted to tackle in terms of story" before Oleson presented his ideas. Oleson drew inspiration from "Born Again" and "Guardian Devil" for the tone of the season. Building the season structurally, Oleson felt if any viewer was "a devout Catholic [...] you could read into the events of the early episodes as a message from God to Matt".

At the start of the season, Oleson noted that Murdock would be "broken physically, broken emotionally, and broken spiritually", with his heightened senses failing him. Oleson added, "He's angry at God, he's angry at the fact that he had risked his life to do God's work, and he's questioning whether or not he was a fool." This results in Murdock donning his original black suit, similar to the one he wore in season one, since he "goes to pretty much the darkest place you can" and is at a point, Oleson notes, "[w]hen he realizes that he's incapable of being Daredevil, [and] he would rather just end it than go forward in his life without abilities." This also allowed Oleson to return the character "to the core idea" of being a boxer's son, "where his fighting style was more brutal and kind of close in combat". Oleson also wanted "to make the action sequences matter in ways that reflected on characters, or had real stakes". He added, "the best writing is one where the action sequences are an inherent part of the story and you cannot predict that the action is going to turn out a certain way."

Regarding the return of Wilson Fisk / Kingpin, Oleson called him "smarter, more calculated, and more manipulative", and felt his inclusion allowed the ability to "tell a story that's relevant to the world around us. I looked at the show as a way to examine how tyrants manipulate in order to push their own agenda and cause fear and distrust." Loeb felt the season went "back to the world of the crime story". Karen Page's backstory is further explored in the season, with Woll explaining it reveals "why shooting someone [James Wesley] and covering it up is a bit more in her wheelhouse," while Foggy Nelson's family and additional backstory is also seen. All of the supporting characters in the season were treated "as emotionally real people as opposed to treating them as props or devices". Oleson wanted them to be "the protagonist of their own journey", modeling this approach after the series Breaking Bad, Game of Thrones, The Sopranos, and The Wire.

Benjamin "Dex" Poindexter does not go by Bullseye in the season. In the season's final sequence, Dex's spine is being operated on before the camera zooms into his face and a bullseye appears in his eye. Oleson "was very interested in telling an origin story not only about how a character we know from the comics as a full-blown psychopath and killer, but how somebody in real life could be turned into something like that." This origin also spoke to the overall theme for the season of fear, which touched the story arcs of Murdock, Page, and Fisk as well. Psychiatrists and psychologists were consulted to help create "a realistic portrait of Dex and how he might be able to turn into Bullseye".

=== Casting ===
Charlie Cox, Deborah Ann Woll, Elden Henson, and Vincent D'Onofrio all return in the season, reprising their roles as Matt Murdock / Daredevil, Karen Page, Franklin "Foggy" Nelson, and Wilson Fisk / Kingpin, respectively. Rider also returns as Blake Tower. In November 2017, Wilson Bethel was cast as a new series regular, Benjamin "Dex" Poindexter, and in January 2018, Joanne Whalley was revealed to have been cast as Maggie Grace, a nun who cares deeply about Murdock's safety; she was mentioned at the end of The Defenders. Jay Ali was cast as FBI agent Rahul "Ray" Nadeem, by March.

Recurring characters in the season include Peter McRobbie as Father Paul Lantom, Danny Johnson as Benjamin Donovan, Geoffrey Cantor as Mitchell Ellison, Amy Rutberg as Marci Stahl, and Royce Johnson as Brett Mahoney, all of whom are reprising their roles from earlier seasons. Other recurring characters include Stephen Rowe as Nicholas Lee, one of Fisk's lawyers; Kate Udall as Tammy Hattley, the Special Agent in Charge of the FBI; Sunita Deshpande as Seema Nadeem and Noah Huq as Sami Nadeem, Ray's wife and son, respectively; Peter Halpin as Theo Nelson, Foggy's brother created for the series; Holly Cinnamon as Julie Barnes, a friend of Dex; Joe Jones as Felix Manning, Fisk's fixer; Kelly McAndrews as Mrs. Shelby, Fisk's surveillance technician; and Matthew McCurdy, Don Castro, Scotty Crow, Richard Prioleau, David Anthony Buglione, Sam Slater, and Andrew Sensenig as FBI agents Wellers, Arinori, Lim, Doyle, Johnson, O'Connor, and Winn, respectively.

Characters making guest appearances from the first two seasons and other MCU media include Matt Gerald as Melvin Potter, John Patrick Hayden as Jack Murdock, Annabella Sciorra as Rosalie Carbone, following up on her character's introduction in the second season of Luke Cage, Ron Simons as NYPD captain Strieber, following his appearance in The Defenders, and former main cast member Ayelet Zurer as Vanessa Marianna-Fisk.

Former Daredevil comic writer and editor Roy Thomas has a cameo appearance as a prison inmate in "Blindsided".

=== Design ===
Costume designer Liz Vastola noted Daredevil's black suit was "purposely ripped and jagged to highlight Matt's state of mind" throughout the season. Vastola described Page's wardrobe as "fucking fierce" as Page transitions into more of an investigative journalist. Foggy Nelson's look is a "complete 180" from what he was wearing in season one, with the character now wearing suits made by Martin Greenfield Clothiers.

=== Filming ===
Filming for the season began on November 13, 2017, in New York City. A week of filming for the season in March 2018 took place in the town of Windham, New York, with set photos revealing that the town was representing Fagan Corners, Vermont, the hometown of Karen Page in the comics. The production paid for the renovation of a local store to portray a diner for the series, and used the town's emergency helicopter pad. Additional filming locations for the week included nearby ski areas and a country club. The exterior of the Lotte New York Palace Hotel served as the building of Fisk's penthouse while under FBI surveillance. An abandoned prison in Staten Island was used for the riot sequence in episode four. Filming for the season was completed by mid-June 2018.

"Blindsided" features a long action sequence filmed in a single take. Oleson credited the episode's director Alex García López, writer Lewaa Nasserdeen, and the stunt team for conceiving the idea. Once the sequence was decided, Oleson asked Marvel to give them a full day to rehearse the sequence, which "no one had ever done before", since "it required every single member of the crew to work in perfect sync." Oleson said once "the crew finally pulled it off, it was something spectacular that injected adrenaline into the crew for the remainder of the season." The sequence, which does not feature any hidden edit cuts, was meant to be a "homage, and then one-upping" of the sequence from season one. Several moments were included in the sequence where the editing team could add a cut if needed, though they did not need them. While editing the episode, Oleson increased the lighting in certain shots "so that the audience could see that we never cut the camera". Cox called the completed sequence "amazing", adding it was "a real testament to the stunt team".

=== Music ===
Composer John Paesano once again returns for the season. A soundtrack album for the season was released digitally by Hollywood Records on October 19, 2018.

All music composed by John Paesano, unless otherwise noted.

Daredevil: Season 3 (Original Soundtrack Album)
No.	Title	Music	Length
1.	"Main Title"	John Paesano and Braden Kimball	1:05
2.	"Subway Feels"		2:37
3.	"The Motorcade"		2:43
4.	"Tazin' in the Dark"		1:53
5.	"Checking Mail"		3:36
6.	"To the Nest"		1:36
7.	"Agent Nadeem"		2:01
8.	"Not Another Hallway"		5:22
9.	"Returning Home"		2:04
10.	"All Star Pitcher"		8:22
11.	"Ricochet Neighbor"		2:28
12.	"The Murdocks"		2:38
13.	"Trading Judgement"		4:42
14.	"Fagan Corners"		3:41
15.	"Elevated Hubbies"		2:35
16.	"Leading the Blind"		3:24
17.	"Perp Walk"		2:49
18.	"Wedding Day Jitters"		4:36
19.	"Dex Plus One"		5:29
20.	"The Funeral"		4:08
21.	"Still Stapled Together"		3:42
22.	"Nelson Murdock and Page"		2:26
23.	"End Credits"		1:06

== Marketing ==
By mid-June 2018, discussions were underway regarding the season being promoted at San Diego Comic-Con that year. A teaser trailer for the season was included as a post-credits scene at the end of the second season of Iron Fist. A full trailer for the season was released on October 4, 2018, which also confirmed Bethel's role as Benjamin Poindexter in the season. Cox, Henson, Woll, D'Onofrio, Whalley, Bethel, and Ali promoted the season at New York Comic Con on October 6, 2018.

== Release ==
The third season of Daredevil was released on October 19, 2018, on the streaming service Netflix, worldwide, in Ultra HD 4K. Initially thought to be releasing in 2017, Netflix COO Ted Sarandos stated in July 2016 that the season would not debut until 2018 at the earliest, after The Defenders released on August 18, 2017. Cox was hopeful the season would debut in 2018, and in October 2017, Marvel revealed the season was indeed expected to release in 2018. In mid-September 2018, the season's release date was revealed.

The season, along with the additional Daredevil seasons and the other Marvel Netflix series, was removed from Netflix on March 1, 2022, due to Netflix's license for the series ending and Disney regaining the rights. The season became available on Disney+ in the United States, Canada, United Kingdom, Ireland, Australia, and New Zealand on March 16, ahead of its debut in Disney+'s other markets by the end of 2022.

== Reception ==
=== Critical response ===
The review aggregation website Rotten Tomatoes reported a 97% approval rating based on 65 reviews, with an average rating of 8.10/10. The website's critical consensus reads, "The Man with No Fear returns to top form with a third season that begins tediously slow but gradually generates comic book thrills, immeasurably helped by the welcome return of Vincent D'Onofrio's menacing Kingpin." Metacritic reported a score of 71 based on 6 reviews.

=== Accolades ===
Year	Award	Category	Nominee(s)	Result	Ref.
2019	Saturn Awards	Best Actor in a Streaming Television Series	Charlie Cox	Nominated	
2019	Saturn Awards	Best Streaming Superhero Series	Daredevil	Won	
2019	Saturn Awards	Best Supporting Actress in a Streaming Television Series	Deborah Ann Woll	Nominated	
2019	Screen Actors Guild Awards	Outstanding Performance by a Stunt Ensemble in a Television Series	Daredevil	Nominated	
