= Blake Tower =

Publication information
- Publisher: Marvel Comics
- First appearance: Daredevil #124 (August 1975)
- Created by: Marv Wolfman; Bob Brown

In-story information
- Alter ego: Blake Tower

Blake Tower is a fictional supporting character appearing in American comic books published by Marvel Comics. An attorney who often appears in stories featuring Spider-Man and Daredevil, he first appeared in Daredevil #124 and was created by writer Marv Wolfman and artist Bob Brown.

Blake Tower appears in the Marvel Cinematic Universe (MCU) television series Daredevil and Luke Cage (both 2016–2018) where he was portrayed by Stephen Rider.

== Publication history ==
Blake Tower first appeared in Daredevil #124 and was created by writer Marv Wolfman and artist Bob Brown.

== Fictional character biography ==
Born in New York, Blake Tower became a brilliant lawyer and opened his own law firm. After watching the clash between Daredevil and Torpedo, Tower competed with Foggy Nelson for election as district attorney, and his campaign won in a landslide. Among his first tasks was the official presentation of the computer W.H.O. (Worldwide Habitual Offender) Dr. Armstrong Smith.

After a brief meeting with the Heroes for Hire, Luke Cage and Iron Fist, Tower dealt with the acquittal of Spider-Man against charges for the death of George Stacy and Norman Osborn. He also tried to help Spider-Man against the attacks of J. Jonah Jameson, Spencer Smythe and the Spider-Slayer.

Subsequently, Tower collected the deposition of Captain America regarding a case involving Batroc the Leaper. This made him several enemies in criminal circles and he became the target of a hit man, only being saved by the intervention of Luke Cage and Iron Fist. Tower participated in trials against Boomerang and Punisher, afterwards convincing the supervillain Slyde to work with and engage his former employer for money laundering. After the murder of colleague Jean DeWolff, Tower assisted in the process of the only suspect, the Sin-Eater and the dissolution of Heroes for Hire, meanwhile following procedures to bring the body of Ned Leeds to the United States.

Tower had a long association with She-Hulk which ended because of the heroine's hectic life.

Tower later participated in the trial of Peter Parker during the "Clone Saga", and in the trial of Winter Soldier for his previous actions.

== In other media ==
Blake Tower appears in television series set in the Marvel Cinematic Universe (MCU), portrayed by Stephen Rider. This version is an assistant district attorney who later becomes a full district attorney following the murder of Samantha Reyes.
