= Stealing Summers =

- Directed by: David Martin Porras
- Written by: Matt Lester
- Produced by: Luz Gyalui
- Starring: Wilson Bethel; Sophie Auster; James Jagger; Mariano Martinez
- Cinematography: Phil Klucsarits
- Edited by: Kate Hackett
- Music by: Nora Kroll-Rosenbaum
- Distributed by: Ingram Entertainment
- Release date: October 23, 2011 (Semana Internacional de Cine de Valladolid)
- Running time: 85 minutes
- Country: United States
- Language: English

Stealing Summers is a 2011 American drama film directed by David Martin Porras, written by Matt Lester, and starring Wilson Bethel, Sophie Auster, James Jagger, and Mariano Martinez. It was filmed on location in Buenos Aires, and premiered at the 2011 Seminci (also known as Semana Internacional de Cine de Valladolid or Valladolid International Film Festival) in Valladolid, Spain.

== Plot ==
Two twenty-something expatriates (Wilson Bethel and James Jagger) spending an indolent summer in Buenos Aires meet a beautiful American girl (Sophie Auster) who reveals a stash of illicit money hidden at her Argentine boyfriend’s (Mariano Martinez) apartment. Dreaming of freedom and never having to return home, the three plot to steal the cash during the weekend of the Superclásico, the epic football derby between bitter rivals Boca and River. One needs the money. One wants the money. Both love the girl. But what starts as a kind of game quickly turns violent, and as passions erupt, the three Americans find themselves on the verge of consequences none of them ever expected.
