= Sophie Auster =

American singer/songwriter and actress

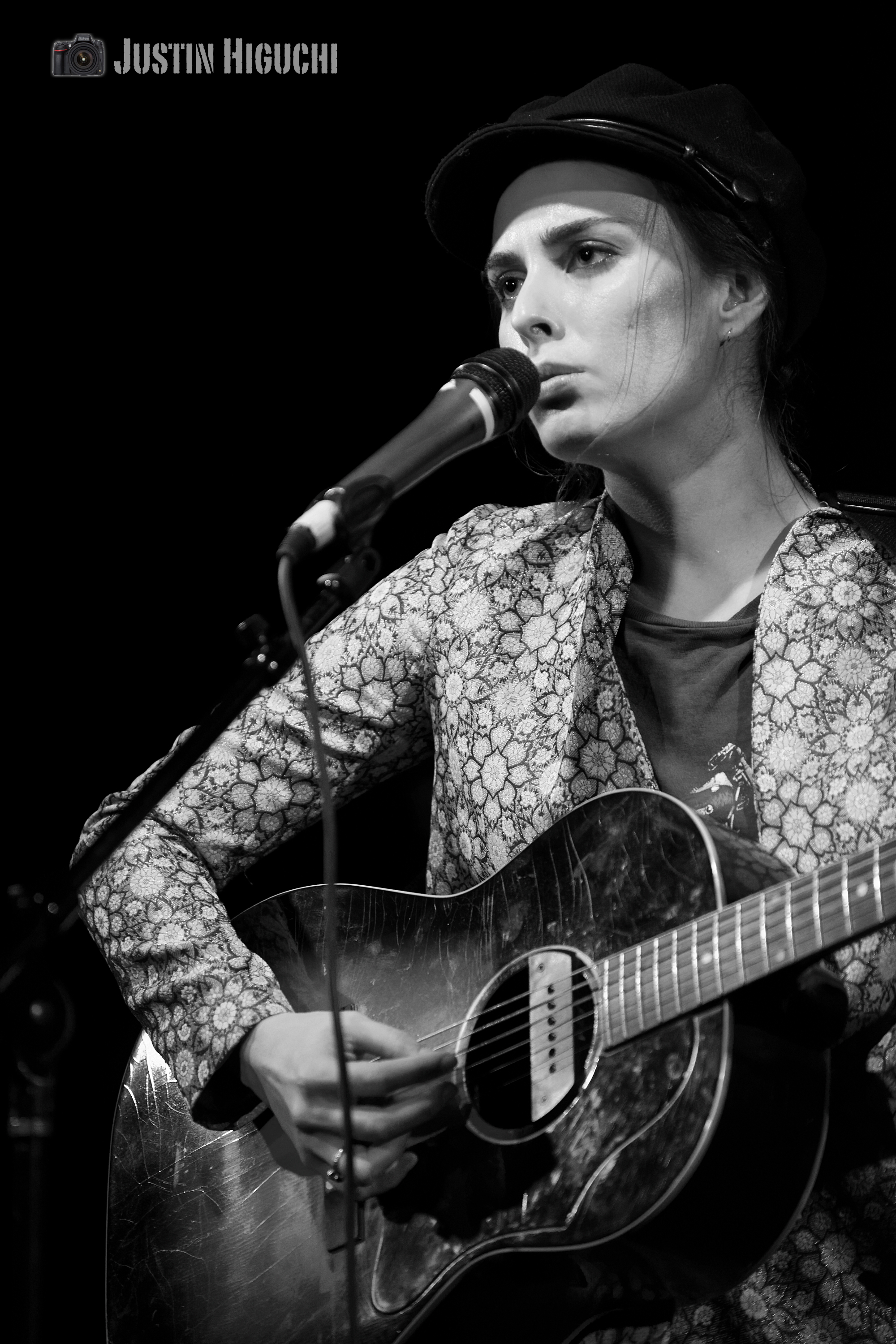
Auster in 2016

Sophie Auster (born July 6, 1987) is an American singer/songwriter and actress. She is the daughter of authors Paul Auster and Siri Hustvedt.

== Early life ==
Sophie Auster was born in Brooklyn, New York City, the daughter of authors Paul Auster and Siri Hustvedt.

At the age of eight, Auster began studying music and classical voice. A year later, at the age of nine, she was cast in the Agnieszka Holland film Washington Square starring Jennifer Jason Leigh, Albert Finney, Maggie Smith and Ben Chaplin. After her early professional experiences, Sophie began acting lessons at the Lee Strasberg Theatre and Film Institute. As a teenager, Auster performed jazz standards at local New York clubs and was a member of an off-Broadway troupe at The Gene Frankel Theater in downtown Manhattan.

== Career ==
Auster was sixteen when she recorded her first record. The album was a collaboration between her and Brooklyn-based musicians Michael Hearst and Joshua Camp of the musical duo One Ring Zero. Using her writer father, Paul Auster's, early translations of French Surrealist poets, along with two original lyrics written by Auster herself, the poetic lines of Tristan Tzara, Paul Eluard, Robert Desnos, Philippe Soupault and Guillaume Apollinaire became songs set to music by Hearst and Camp.

The collaboration began as a side project Auster pursued after school and on weekends. It was never intended for wide public consumption, but when a family friend heard the album, she was so impressed that she offered to release it on the French label Naïve Records. Her subsequent self-titled album is Sophie Auster.

In July 2006, Auster was on the cover of the Spanish issue of Rolling Stone magazine. In 2007, Auster began writing with writer/musician Barry Reynolds. The two have collaborated on many songs. After graduating from Sarah Lawrence College in 2010, Auster began recording again. Her self-produced E.P., Red Weather, was released November 13, 2012, through Lost Colony Music. Auster's full-length LP, Dogs and Men, was released in June 2015 via Sony Red. In 2016 Sophie was a grand prize recipient in The John Lennon Songwriting Contest for her song "Little Bird". In October 2017, Sophie won the Cosmopolitan Magazine singer of the year award in Spain. She appeared on the cover of Cosmopolitan Magazine's, Spanish edition, in the March 2018 music issue.

In 2016, Auster began work on her last full-length album, Next Time, with producer Tore Johansson. Introduced by fellow songwriter, Nicole Atkins, Sophie packed her bags and left to record her album with Johansson in Malmo, Sweden. Johansson and Auster, alongside musician and producer assistant, Martin Gjerstadd worked for months recording and mixing the album. After shopping the completed album around for over a year to different labels, Sophie was then signed to a recording and publishing contract with BMG Music worldwide, and Next Time was released in April 2019. Sophie toured the album extensively around Europe and the United States. She subsequently opened for Rock and Roll Hall of Fame inductee Bryan Ferry in the summer of 2019. The lead single, "Mexico", from Next Time will be featured in the upcoming John Turturro film The Jesus Rolls. The film had its world premiere at The Rome Film Festival on October 16, 2019. It was scheduled to be released on February 28, 2020, by Screen Media Films. The film stars Susan Sarandon, Bobby Cannavale, Audrey Tautou, Pete Davidson, and Christopher Walken.

After touring, Auster went back into the studio with Brooklyn-based producer Daniel Schlett. Together they created a more progressive pop sound for the indie singer. In November 2019, the two song EP entitled History Happens at Night was released via BMG Music. An accompanying music video for the single "If I Could" followed, featuring trans activist and actress, Jari Jones, and Are You the One? MTV alum, Basit Shittu. The video, premiered on V Magazine's website in November 2019, is directed by Auster's photographer husband, Spencer Ostrander, and cinematographer, Theodore King. She continues working on new music in New York City.

== Personal life ==
Since 2019 she has been married to the photographer Spencer Ostrander. At the beginning of 2024, shortly before her father died, she gave birth to a son, Miles.

== Discography ==
Year	Title
2005	Sophie Auster
2012	Red Weather
2015	Dogs and Men
2019	Next Time
2019	History Happens at Night
2022	Dancing With Strangers
2025	Milk For Ulcers

== Filmography ==
Year	Film	Role	Notes
1998	Lulu on the Bridge	Sonia Kleinman	(by Paul Auster)
2005	As Smart As They Are: The Author Project	herself	(by Joe Pacheco)
2007	The Inner Life of Martin Frost	Anna James	(by Paul Auster)
2010	Circuit	Ana	(by Xavier Ribera)
2010	The Imperialists Are Still Alive!	Savina	(by Zeina Durra)
2011	Stealing Summers	Alexandra	(by David Martin-Porras)
2012	Grand Street	Jessica	(by Lex Sidon)
2012	Nous York		(by Hervé Mimran and Géraldine Nakache)
2014	Indiana	Linda	(by Toni Comas)
2014	The Story of the Invisible		(by Shirley Monsarrat)
2015	Mozart in the Jungle	Gabrielle	(Amazon Prime)
2020	The Zurich Liaison - Wagner's One and Only Love	Mathilde Wesendonck	(by Jens Neubert)
