= List of Daredevil (TV series) characters =

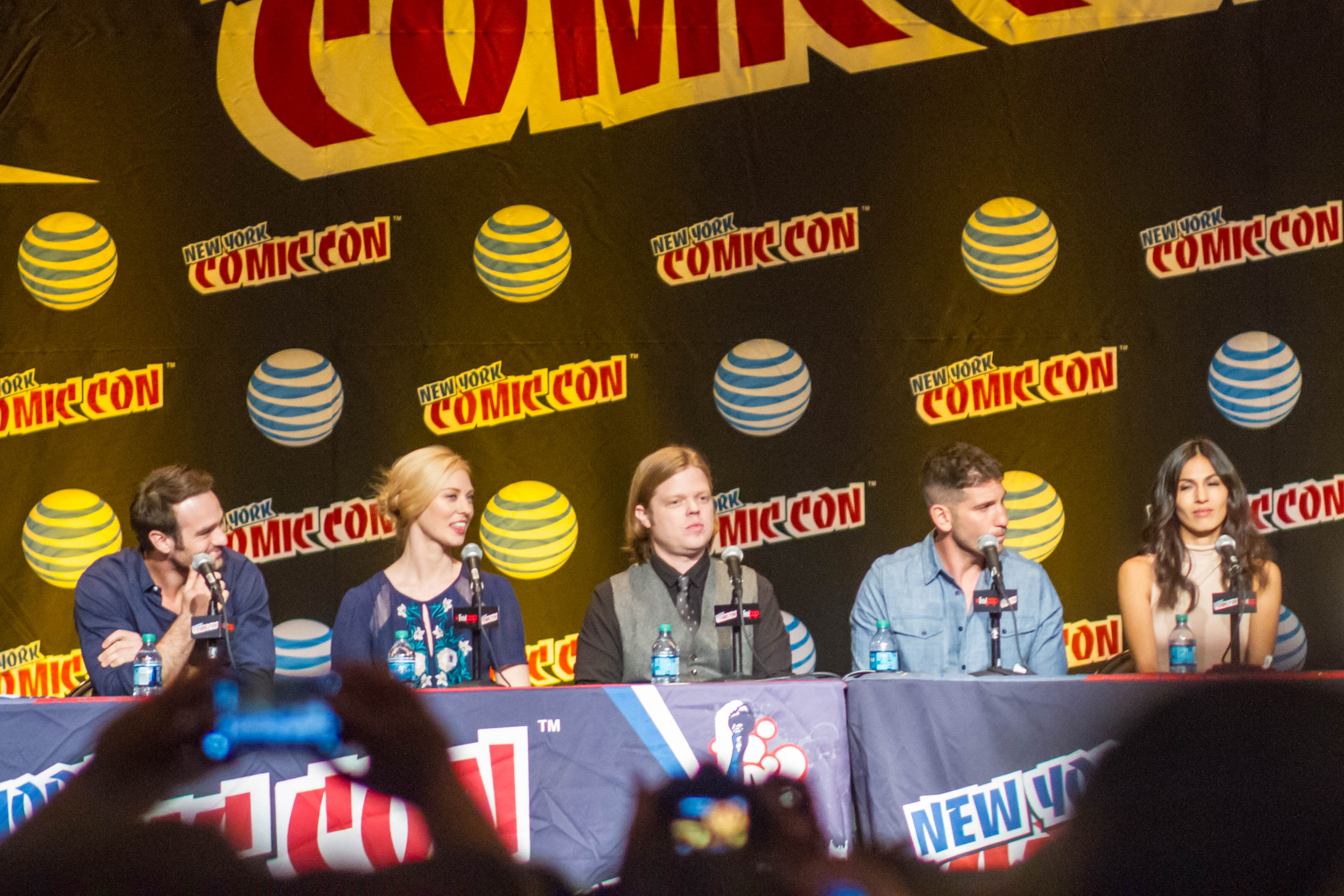
Main cast members (L–R)) Cox, Woll, Henson, Bernthal, and Yung at the 2015 New York Comic Con.

Daredevil is an American television series created for Netflix by Drew Goddard, based on the Marvel Comics character of the same name. It is set in the Marvel Cinematic Universe (MCU), sharing continuity with the films of the franchise, and is the first in a series of shows that lead up to a crossover miniseries, The Defenders.

The series stars Charlie Cox as Matt Murdock / Daredevil, as well as Deborah Ann Woll, Elden Henson, Rosario Dawson, and Vincent D'Onofrio. Toby Leonard Moore, Vondie Curtis-Hall, Bob Gunton, and Ayelet Zurer join them in the first season, while Jon Bernthal, Élodie Yung, and Stephen Rider join them for the second; Joanne Whalley, Jay Ali and Wilson Bethel join for season three. In addition to original characters, several characters based on various Marvel properties also appear throughout the series.

A Disney+ revival series, Daredevil: Born Again (2025–present), sees numerous Daredevil actors reprising their roles, including Cox, Woll, Henson, Moore, D'Onofrio, Zurer, Bernthal, Yung, and Bethel.

== Overview ==
Character	Portrayed by	Appearances			
Character	Portrayed by	First	Season 1	Season 2	Season 3
Main characters
Matt Murdock Daredevil	Charlie Cox	"Into the Ring"	Main	Main	Main
Karen Page	Deborah Ann Woll	"Into the Ring"	Main	Main	Main
Foggy Nelson	Elden Henson	"Into the Ring"	Main	Main	Main
James Wesley	Toby Leonard Moore	"Into the Ring"	Main		
Leland Owlsley	Bob Gunton	"Into the Ring"	Main		
Wilson Fisk Kingpin	Vincent D'Onofrio	"Into the Ring"	Main (Note: For his first appearance in the second season at the end of "Guilty as Sin", D'Onofrio was credited as a "Special Guest Star" in the end credits, though he had main billing for his subsequent appearances in the season.)	Main	Main
Claire Temple	Rosario Dawson	"Cut Man"	Main	Main	
Ben Urich	Vondie Curtis-Hall	"Rabbit in a Snowstorm"	Main		
Vanessa Marianna-Fisk	Ayelet Zurer	"Rabbit in a Snowstorm"	Main		Guest
Frank Castle Punisher	Jon Bernthal	"Bang"		Main	
Blake Tower	Stephen Rider	"Dogs to a Gunfight"		Main	Main
Elektra Natchios	Élodie Yung	"Penny and Dime"		Main	
Maggie Grace	Joanne Whalley	"Resurrection"			Main
Ray Nadeem	Jay Ali	"Resurrection"			Main
Benjamin "Dex" Poindexter	Wilson Bethel	"Please"			Main
Recurring characters
Paul Lantom	Peter McRobbie	"Into the Ring"	Recurring	Guest	Recurring
Turk Barrett	Rob Morgan	"Into the Ring"	Recurring	Guest	
Brett Mahoney	Royce Johnson	"Into the Ring"	Recurring	Recurring	Recurring
Carl Hoffman	Daryl Edwards	"Into the Ring"	Recurring		
Christian Blake	Chris Tardio	"Into the Ring"	Recurring		
Gao	Wai Ching Ho	"Into the Ring"	Recurring	Guest	
Nobu Yoshioka	Peter Shinkoda	"Into the Ring"	Recurring	Recurring	
Vladimir Ranskahov	Nikolai Nikolaeff	"Into the Ring"	Recurring		
Josie	Susan Varon	"Cut Man"	Recurring	Recurring	
Doris Urich	Adriane Lenox	"Rabbit in a Snowstorm"	Recurring		
Mitchell Ellison	Geoffrey Cantor	"Rabbit in a Snowstorm"	Recurring	Recurring	Recurring
Shirley Benson	Suzanne H. Smart	"Rabbit in a Snowstorm"	Guest	Guest	
Elena Cardenas	Judith Delgado	"World on Fire"	Recurring		
Marci Stahl	Amy Rutberg	"World on Fire"	Recurring	Guest	Recurring
Stick	Scott Glenn	"Stick"	Guest	Recurring	
Francis	Tom Walker	"Shadows in the Glass"	Recurring		
Melvin Potter	Matt Gerald	"Shadows in the Glass"	Guest	Guest	Guest
Samantha Reyes	Michelle Hurd	"Dogs to a Gunfight"		Recurring	
Louisa Delgado	Marilyn Torres	"New York's Finest"		Recurring	
Hirochi	Ron Nakahara	"Kinbaku"		Recurring	
Stan Gibson	John Pirkis	"Kinbaku"		Recurring	
Benjamin "Big Ben" Donovan	Danny Johnson	"Seven Minutes in Heaven"		Guest	Recurring
Nicholas Lee	Stephen Rowe	"Resurrection"			Recurring
Tammy Hattley	Kate Udall	"Resurrection"			Recurring
Seema Nadeem	Sunita Deshpande	"Resurrection"			Recurring
Sami Nadeem	Noah Huq	"Resurrection"			Recurring
Wellers	Matthew McCurdy	"Please"			Recurring
Theo Nelson	Peter Halpin	"Please"			Recurring
Arinori	Don Castro	"Please"			Recurring
Julie Barnes	Holly Cinnamon	"No Good Deed"			Recurring
Lim	Scotty Crowe	"No Good Deed"			Recurring
Doyle	Richard Prioleau	"No Good Deed"			Recurring
Johnson	David Anthony Buglione	"No Good Deed"			Recurring
O'Connor	Sam Slater	"No Good Deed"			Recurring
Winn	Andrew Sensenig	"Blindsided"			Recurring
Felix Manning	Joe Jones	"The Perfect Game"			Recurring
Mrs. Shelby	Kelly McAndrew	"Aftermath"			Recurring

== Main characters ==
=== Matt Murdock / Daredevil ===
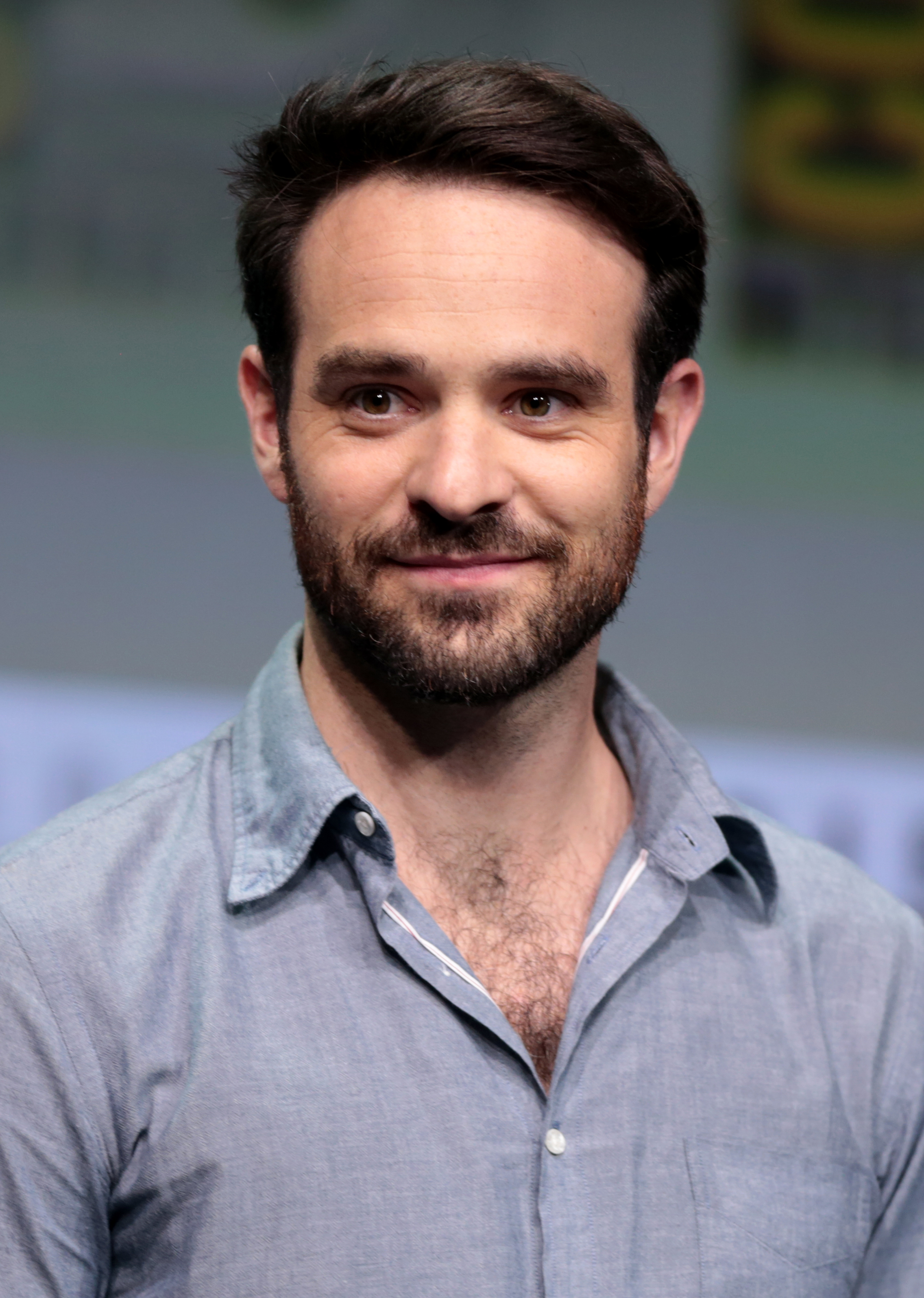
Charlie Cox

Matthew "Matt" Murdock (portrayed by Charlie Cox) was blinded in a car accident as a child, which heightened his other senses. Approached by the elderly and blind ninja Stick, Murdock trains to hone his senses so he can "see" using them, and also learns martial arts, with Stick wanting a soldier for his secret war. Stick leaves Murdock when he realizes that the boy wants a father figure, and Murdock eventually attends Columbia University School of Law. Meeting Foggy Nelson, the two graduate and intern at the law firm Landman and Zack, but Murdock grows uncomfortable with the firm's lack of morals, just as he begins to take vigilante action against those he knows the law cannot prosecute. Murdock and Nelson decide to start their own law firm, and through their first client, Karen Page become embroiled in the politics of post-Incident Hell's Kitchen. Murdock and his allies are able to take down crime lord Wilson Fisk using the law, and when Fisk escapes custody, Murdock defeats him as the vigilante, who is christened 'Daredevil' by the media.

At the end of May 2014, Cox was cast as Murdock. The idea of casting Cox as Daredevil came from Marvel's Chief Creative Officer Joe Quesada in 2012, before Marvel Studios gained the rights to the character from 20th Century Fox. Cox wanted to be involved with the series after reading the first two scripts for the series, telling his agent "These are two of the best TV scripts I've read". Season one showrunner Steven DeKnight stated that "He's not super strong. He's not invulnerable. In every aspect, he's a man that's just pushed himself to the limits, he just has senses that are better than a normal human's. He is human." On the character's "grey" morals, he said, "He's a lawyer by day, and he's taken this oath. But every night he breaks that oath, and goes out and does very violent things. I really liked the flawed heroes, the human heroes." The character's Catholicism plays a large role in the series, with DeKnight calling him "one of the most, if not the most, religious characters in the Marvel Universe". Cox, who was raised Catholic, found that helpful, saying, "You grow up steeped in that. If you're in church, standing in front of the altar, you sort of automatically know how to respond. It all kicks in – you genuflect, you sit in the pew. I didn't have to pretend any of that." On how the name Daredevil is revealed in the series, DeKnight explained that "We talked about, do we do one of the versions in the comics where when he was a kid people used to taunt him with the name Daredevil, but that didn't quite feel like our world. At one point we were going to have Ben Urich (Vondie Curtis-Hall) give him the name, but the timing wasn't right from where he's in his black outfit and then gets his suit, which is after Ben's untimely demise. There was something technically tricky of somebody actually saying the words, "Hey you're some kind of Daredevil." The solution was to play that off-screen and then hit it in the paper that he's been given this name Daredevil." Skylar Gaertner plays a young Matt Murdock.

Cox reprises the role in MCU productions produced by Marvel Studios, starting with the film Spider-Man: No Way Home (2021).

=== Karen Page ===
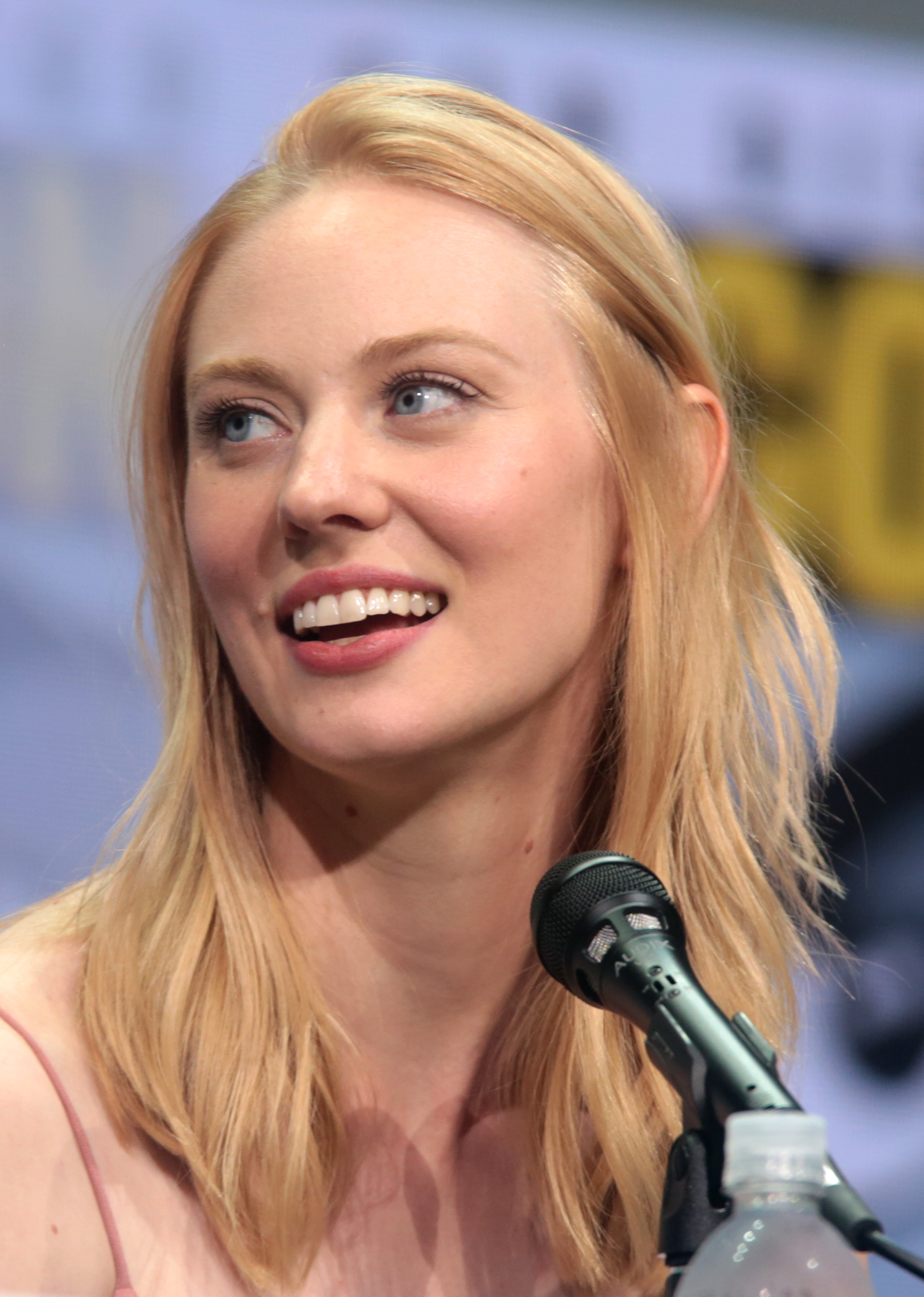
Deborah Ann Woll

Page (portrayed by Deborah Ann Woll) is an office worker who discovers corruption in her place of employment, Union Allied, and is subsequently framed for murder, and then the subject of attempted murder, with Murdock and Nelson helping her with the former, and the vigilante with the latter. Joining Murdock and Nelson as their paralegal, Page is determined to take down the corruption in Hell's Kitchen and works with reporter Ben Urich to expose Fisk. When Fisk's right-hand man James Wesley discovers their investigation, which leads to Fisk's beloved mother, Wesley kidnaps Page and attempts to blackmail her. Page kills Wesley with his own gun in self-defense and escapes but becomes traumatized by the incident enough to sympathize with Punisher's goals. She later quits working for Murdock after learning his secret identity and becomes a reporter herself after Urich is murdered by Fisk.

Woll was cast as Page in July 2014. On creating the character of Karen Page, after portraying Jessica Hamby in True Blood from 2008 to 2014, Woll said, "I'm already starting to notice huge differences between the two characters [...] I can feel myself go, 'Oh, if this was Jessica she would do this,' but wanting to kind of steer differently than that. It's always going to be me in some way. I think, as an actor, that's part of it." Woll had not previously read any Daredevil comics, and turned to her boyfriend who is "a huge comic book fan" for guidance. She also added that Page's backstory would be different from the one from the comics, saying, "In the comic books, in the beginning Karen is very innocent, and then towards the end she's really swung a full 180, she's in a lot of trouble, so I wanted to find a way to make her both of those things at the same time. Can she be a really wonderful, kind person who is a little bit attracted to danger? She's not just always getting into trouble because 'Oh, silly woman!' Karen is actually looking for it, and she won't let her fear stop her from finding the truth." Woll does not watch the series, which helped in the second season where Page was unaware of Murdock's role as Daredevil, as she never saw Cox acting as Daredevil in the costume.

Costume designer Stephanie Maslansky looked to Page's backstory within the show when designing her costumes, with Page having dreams and fantasies of a life in New York along the lines of Katharine Hepburn and Lauren Bacall, and dressing according to those thoughts ("retro, slim skirts, tighter fitting tops and slim dresses"). Maslansky also said that "Page embodies innocence and knowingness. We referenced the comic illustrations and updated them, then built her wardrobe with the same retro nod as for the other characters [...] Her look is body conscious and professional."

Explaining why Page does not tell Murdock and Nelson that she has killed Wesley, DeKnight said, "There's something that happened in Karen's past — we allude to it, Ben alludes to it — and when she grabs the gun she says, "You think this is the first time I've ever shot somebody?" That's a secret from her past that she doesn't want anyone to know. The fact that she shot him once, you can explain that as self-defense; but then she pretty much unloaded the gun into him. That crosses a bit of a line. The last thing she would want is for those two to be horrified by what she's done."

Woll reprised the role in Marvel Studios' Disney+ series Daredevil: Born Again (2025–present).

=== Foggy Nelson ===
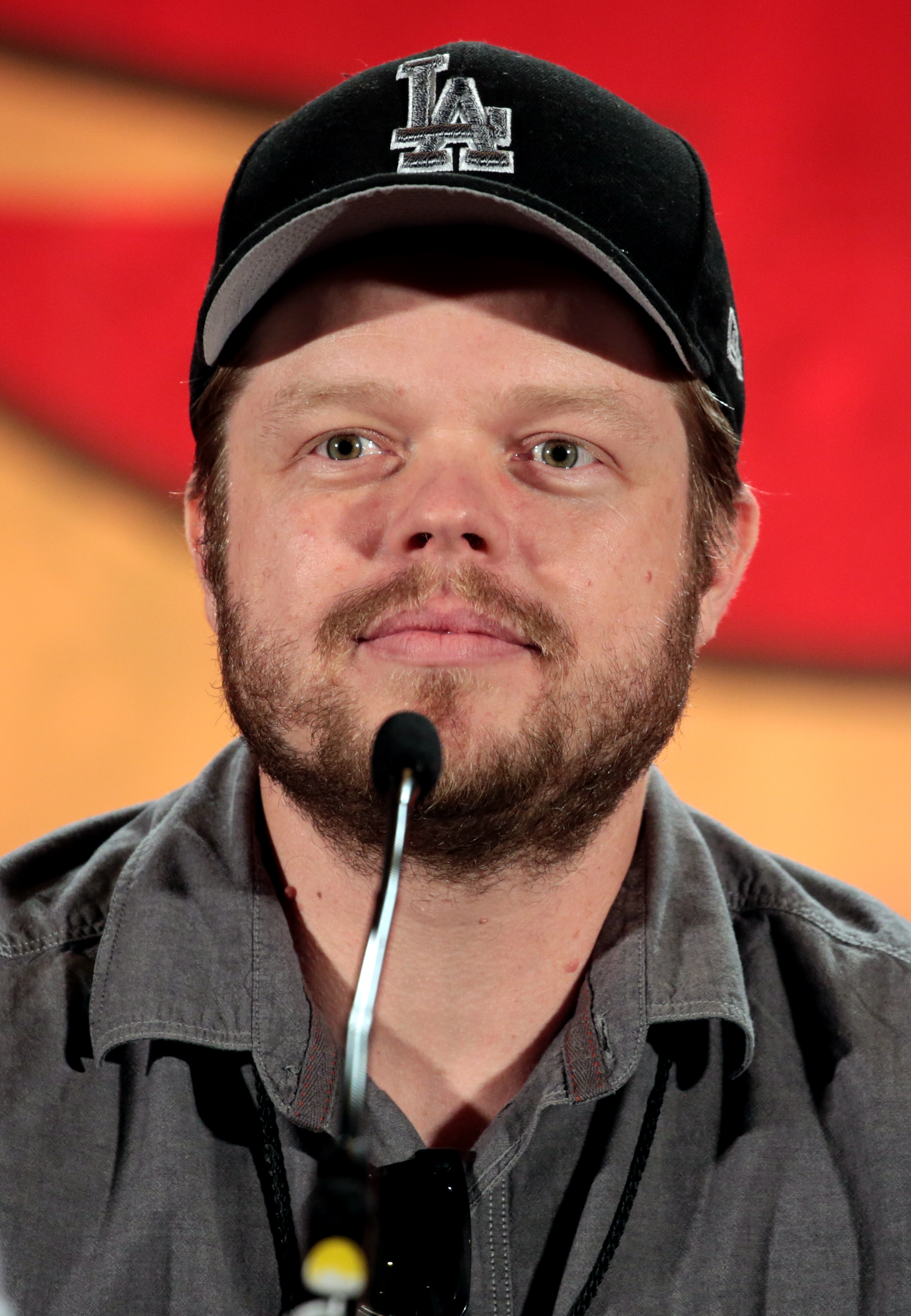
Elden Henson

Franklin "Foggy" Percy Nelson (portrayed by Elden Henson) met Matt Murdock at law school and became best friends with him. After interning together at Landman and Zack, Nelson and Murdock start their own law firm in Hell's Kitchen, where Nelson wants to fight for 'the little guy'. His friendship with Murdock falters after he discovers the latter's vigilante activities, but they become close again following their defeat of Fisk.

Henson joined the cast as Nelson in June 2014, and in April 2015 he spoke of his excitement for the character's role in the series, saying "I was really excited as I was getting the scripts and reading that Foggy wasn't just a useless sidekick. He's not just comic relief. I mean, he is some of those things. He does have comic relief, but it was exciting to know that these other characters would have their own path and their own things that they're dealing with." Maslansky noted that "In the original comics illustrations Foggy wears a bowtie and his color palette is lively. We updated his look but didn't stray from his overall distinctive style—quirky but not flamboyant. He favors warm colors and printed shirts. His ties are patterned with animals or objects. Even his socks are patterned and colorful. The audience may never see them, but the actor does. Foggy has one particular accessory that helps define his look, a vintage tie-bar w/ the letter "F". We imagine it was a gift from his father."

Henson reprised the role in Daredevil: Born Again.

=== James Wesley ===
James Wesley (portrayed by Toby Leonard Moore) is Wilson Fisk's right-hand man and friend who does a lot of his hands-on work. After discovering that Page met with Fisk's beloved mother while investigating Fisk, Wesley confronts Page in an attempt to blackmail her and is killed by Page with his own gun in self-defense.

Moore was announced as cast in the role of Wesley in October 2014. Moore described Wesley as an "interesting character to play, because in one moment he can be incredibly charming, and in the next, dastardly as all hell, manipulative and Machiavellian, but always loyal to Wilson Fisk." Talking about the killing of Wesley by Page, and if it was due to carelessness on the behalf of the former, DeKnight said "It was a moment of underestimating Karen Page. We always knew he was going to die; that was decided at the beginning of the season that Karen was going to kill Wesley at some point but the mechanics of 'how' were tricky. It's not so much a moment of carelessness as it was underestimating Karen. He dies because Wilson Fisk is worried about him. That moment when Fisk calls him is the split-second distraction that allows Karen to grab the gun."

Moore reprised the role in the second season of Daredevil: Born Again.

=== Ben Urich ===
Benjamin "Ben" Urich (portrayed by Vondie Curtis-Hall) is an investigative journalist for the New York Bulletin, struggling with the lack of interest in the crime pieces that made him successful during his youth, and with his sick wife for whom he can barely afford to keep in hospital or move to a retirement home. He agrees to work with Page in her investigation of Fisk, but after Fisk learns that Urich met with his mother while investigating him, he breaks into Urich's apartment and strangles him to death.

Curtis-Hall joined the series as Urich in October 2014. The decision to kill off Urich, an iconic comic book character, was made by Marvel before DeKnight joined the show. He explained that Marvel "really wanted to show that toward the end of the season because we knew we'd get some sympathy for Fisk, to have him do something truly terrible that would propel Matt into that final endgame in the confrontation with Fisk. And to let the audience know that the gloves were off: just because he was a beloved character in the comics, doesn't mean he's safe [...] Urich gets murdered because he committed the unforgivable sin in Fisk's mind: he went to Fisk's mother. The last thing you want to do with Fisk is at all involve, insult, drag through the mud the women in his life he loves. That will be a serious trigger for him."

=== Leland Owlsley ===
Leland Owlsley (portrayed by Bob Gunton) is an accountant who works for Fisk, controlling the money for all of Fisk's allies as well. Owlsley disapproves of Fisk's relationship with Vanessa Marianna, and he works with Madame Gao to have the former killed in an assassination attempt made to look like an attempt on Fisk. Though the attempt fails, Fisk is extremely angered by the event, and when he discovers that Owlsley has been taking Fisk's money for himself, Fisk throws Owlsley down an elevator shaft, killing him.

Gunton was added to the cast in October 2014.

=== Vanessa Marianna-Fisk ===
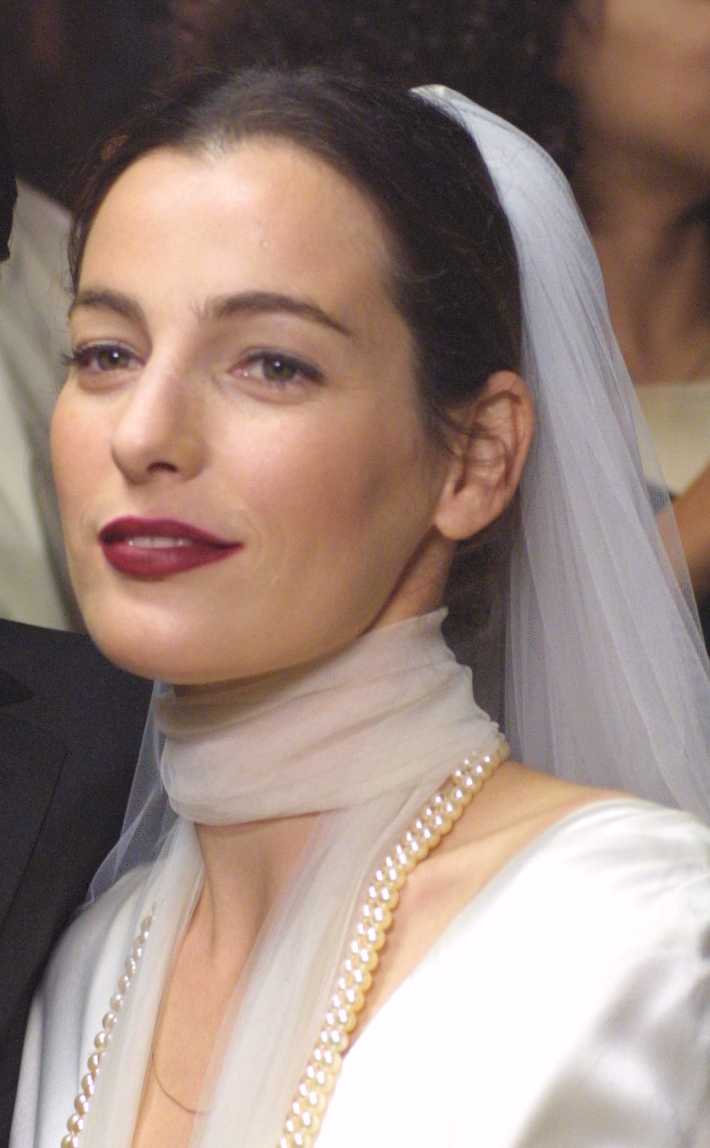
Ayelet Zurer

Vanessa Marianna-Fisk (portrayed by Ayelet Zurer) is an art gallery curator who catches the eye of Fisk, and is acceptive of his line of work. Growing close with Fisk, Vanessa helps him come out to New York as an apparently legitimate businessman, and when Fisk's true dealings are revealed, she accepts his offer of marriage. When Fisk is defeated by Daredevil and imprisoned, Vanessa leaves the country on her own. After Fisk makes a deal with the FBI to ensure Vanessa would not be charged as an accessory for his crimes, she returns to New York and marries Fisk.

Zurer joined the cast as Vanessa in October 2014. Clinical psychologist Dr. Andrea Letamendi noted that Vanessa "allows us to see the compassion Fisk has, and it's genuine that he's so loving and heartfelt and compassionate—he has this sense of connection to humanity. It's so interesting to have that dynamic and that this incredibly intelligent, powerful woman brings it out in him." Maslansky looked to Vanessa's backstory in the show, with the character coming into the series as a mysterious yet glamorous femme fatale, dressing in high-end, couture clothing; "she needed to appeal to [Fisk]. He wouldn't go for just any chick in a pair of old jeans and a t-shirt."

Though originally intended to be replaced by Sandrine Holt, Zurer reprised the role in Daredevil: Born Again.

=== Claire Temple ===
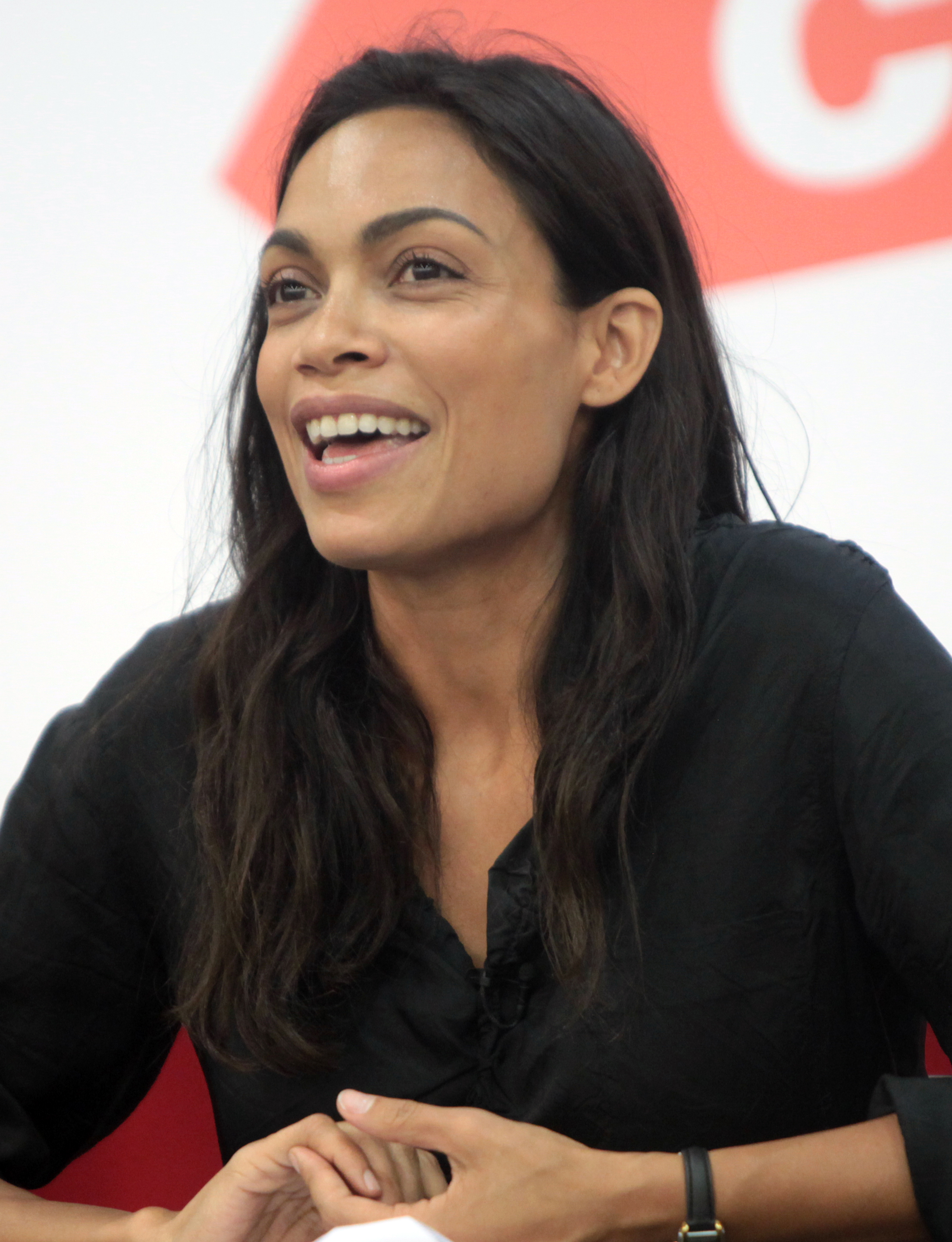
Rosario Dawson

Claire Temple (portrayed by Rosario Dawson) is a nurse who helps Murdock when she finds him beaten and injured, and after he saves her from some Russians who are using her to get to him, she becomes his confidant and near-full-time nurse. The two have a falling out when Murdock explains that a relationship between the two would not work, but she still helps him on occasion when needed.

Rosario Dawson joined the cast in June 2014, and her role was revealed to be that of Temple in October of that year. The character is an amalgam of Temple and Night Nurse. DeKnight noted that the character was originally "going to be the actual Night Nurse from the comics [...] we had her name in a script and it came back that it was possible [the feature side] were going to use her" and "had plans for her down the road," necessitating the team to use the more obscure comics character Claire Temple as her name. Maslansky revealed that "Claire Temple's look is effortless and casual; she exudes an unstudied sensuality. She wears slim boyfriend jeans and shirts that skim rather than hug the body. Her clothing might indicate a woman who has travelled or at least has an interest in cultures other than her own."

Dawson explained that "[her] character is a normal person and she becomes more heroic in a way that she maybe didn't expect", and went on to state that "She's not a love interest – she's this skeptical eye looking at this strange situation. She's the one who can be like, "You're not really good at this." That makes it feel more real." On her character's relationship to Murdock, Dawson said that "The show explores how necessary it is for two people to finally have their masks off with each other. For Matt Murdock, this is the first person he has that's going to be able to see that transition for him. For her, she's someone who also throws herself into the fray and had made it her life mission to help, even if that means risking her own life. But she gets confronted with the question: How far will you go? What does it mean if you're helping someone who is maybe going to hurt other people?"

=== Wilson Fisk / Kingpin ===
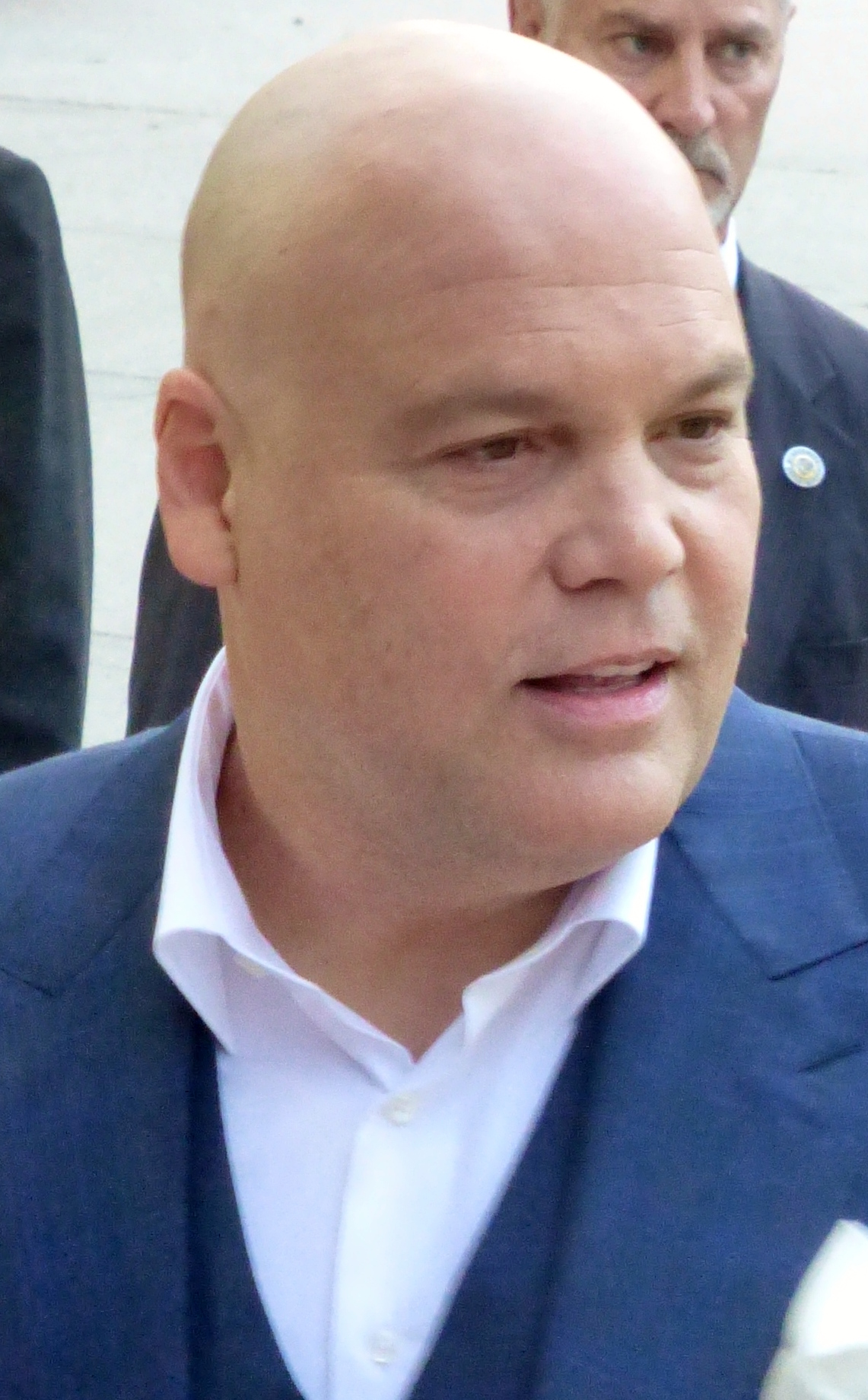
Vincent D'Onofrio

Wilson Fisk (portrayed by Vincent D'Onofrio), along with his mother, was emotionally abused as a child by his father, until he killed him. His mother, who was often beaten by her husband, helped him cover it up, and Fisk grew up wanting to make Hell's Kitchen a better place, with no people like his father. He planned to buy the entire neighborhood, demolish it, and build a new and better Hell's Kitchen. He was opposed by Murdock both as a lawyer and a vigilante, and he began to lose the trust of his allies after he began seeing Vanessa Marianna. His dealings are exposed to the FBI by a whistle-blower that Murdock protected, and when he attempts to escape custody he is defeated in combat by Murdock as Daredevil and incarcerated at Rikers Island. During his incarceration, Wilson Fisk works to gain control of the inmates while being visited by his lawyer Benjamin Donovan. When Punisher is sent to Rikers Island, Wilson Fisk manipulates Punisher into killing a rival inmate and later orchestrates Punisher's escape.

In season three, he cuts a deal with the FBI to become their informant in exchange for a house arrest deal at the Presidential Hotel and for Vanessa to not be incriminated for Wilson Fisk's crimes. When he starts swaying some of the FBI to his side including Benjamin Poindexter, Wilson Fisk takes up the name of Kingpin. FBI agent Ray Nadeem provides posthumous testimony against Kingpin, who fights Daredevil and paralyzes Dex. Daredevil spares Kingpin's life and promises he will leave Vanessa unharmed in return for his going to Rikers Island and not harming Karen or Foggy.

D'Onofrio, who was cast as Fisk in June 2014, stated that he hoped his portrayal of Fisk was a new way to look at the character, and that it would be the definitive portrayal of the character. "Our Fisk, he's a child and he's a monster," D'Onofrio said. "Every move that he makes and everything that he does in our story comes from his foundation of morality inside himself." In December 2014, DeKnight detailed that "Fisk has very many different aspects so it's not all, "I want to conquer the city and make a lot of money". In our story, we tell the story of how he met his wife Vanessa and how they fell in love – our antagonist actually has a love story. That's the love story you're following, the one you're invested in, and seeing how that affects him and changes him." He also said that "if you're looking for a juicy, multi-faceted crime drama, Wilson Fisk was the obvious choice to play the antagonist [...] [he] really felt like the right yin to the yang for Matt, and for what we wanted to do this season." Concerning Fisk not being called Kingpin during the first season, like he is in the comics, DeKnight explained that "I think there is a, dare I say, critical mass where things get a little bit silly. You know if in the last five minutes we went, "Oh they called him Daredevil! Oh they called him Kingpin!" It's a little too much. Also there was no real natural way to get to Kingpin. It felt a little off. There is a point down the line to get there." Discussing Fisk's fighting style, compared to Daredevil's, series stunt coordinator Philip J Silvera said that, "I feel like they're almost two sides to the same coin. They're both doing things for their city. And it's a tricky thing with their two characters. I think when you get the Fisk character to a certain point, it just becomes pure rage, and all thought process is out the window. [...] The brutality is just relentless with him. When he gets into this mode, he just keeps going until he's done. And that's it. He will drive for you. That is the Kingpin, that is D'Onofrio. He's a very smooth, calculating individual, but when you bring the rage out in him, he's like a bulldozer." Cole Jensen plays a young Wilson Fisk.

Maslansky explained that "Wilson Fisk has a specific look. His choices reflect the man he is and the man he's become. As with Matt Murdock's costumes, I was influenced by the comics with the same stipulation that they feel authentic and modern. We dressed Fisk in current style, embracing a slim silhouette. It's classic and consistent. His clothing was custom-made by a highly skilled tailor, Michael Andrews, who's well versed in modern design details." Significant props used for Fisk in the series are his father's cufflinks, on which Maslansky said, "[Fisk's father] would have bought them in the 1950s or '60s—a mid-century design. We searched for the perfect vintage cufflinks. We finally landed on a sterling silver pair with interesting negative space. We knew from reading ahead we'd need many duplicates. I redesigned them, adding more detail—a tiger's eye stone and a portion of it cast in gold. They retained a mid-century look, enhanced to become unique in the world."

D'Onofrio reprises the role in MCU productions produced by Marvel Studios, starting with the Disney+ series Hawkeye (2021).

=== Frank Castle / Punisher ===
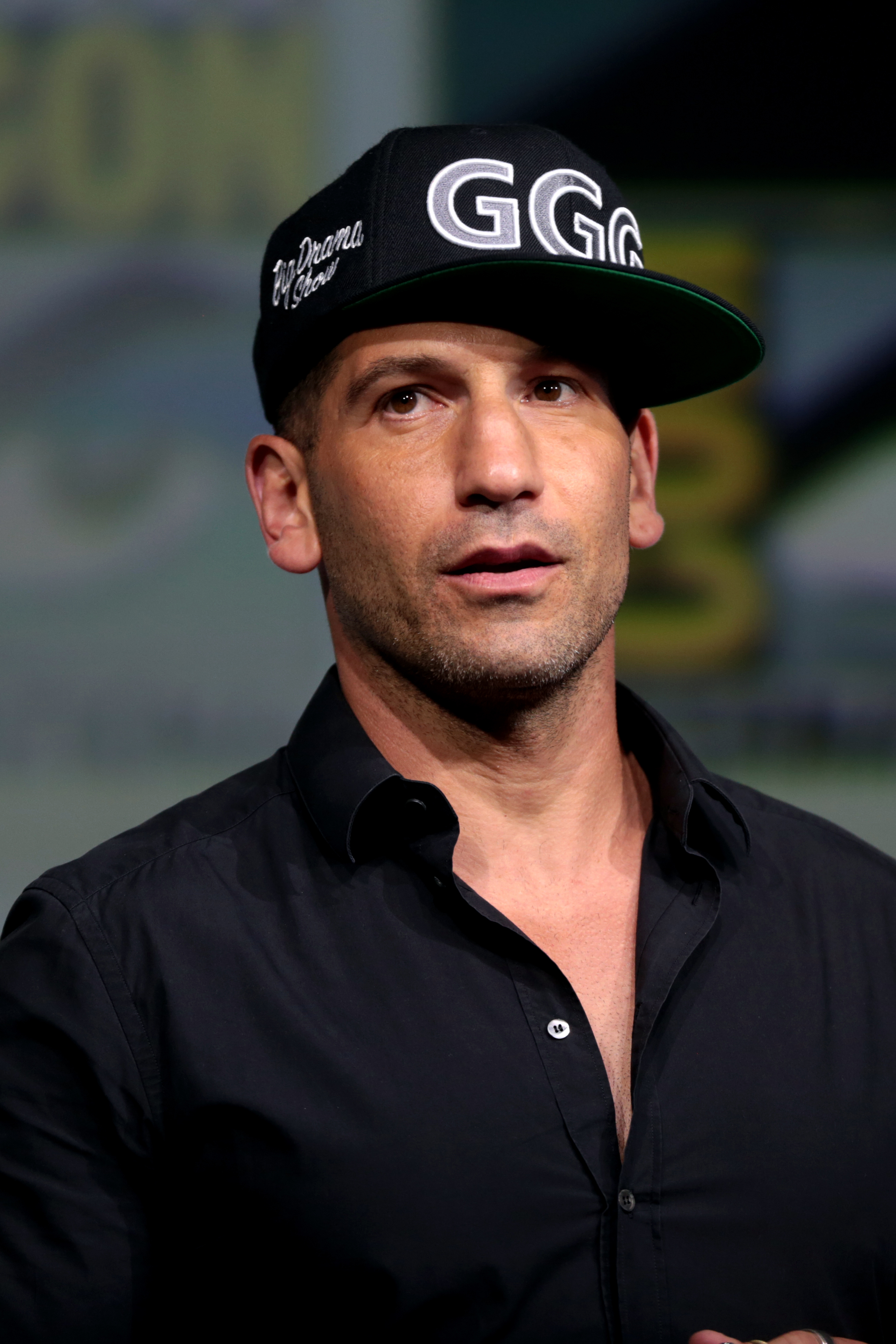
Jon Bernthal

Francis "Frank" Castle Sr. (portrayed by Jon Bernthal) is a vigilante who aims to clean up Hell's Kitchen by any means necessary, no matter how lethal the results, which earns him the name 'The Punisher' from the media.

In June 2015, Marvel announced that Jon Bernthal was cast as Castle for the second season. DeKnight and the writers had discussed introducing the character in a post-credits scene during the first-season finale, but were unable due to the way that Netflix begins the next episode during the credits of the current one. The scene would have seen Owlsley escape rather than be killed by Fisk, only to be killed by Castle, whose face would not be revealed, but whose iconic skull insignia would have been featured. DeKnight felt that this "was the right decision. I think there's a better, more organic way to introduce him to the world." DeKnight also noted that this version of Punisher would be "completely the Marvel version," as previous portrayals did not appear under the Marvel Studios / Marvel Television banner. He also felt Bernthal's Punisher would not be as "graphically violent" as in Punisher: War Zone. Goddard felt that television was the best fit for the character, as the writers are "able to do things on the small screen that fit that character better than if we had to water him down for the movies." Season two showrunners Doug Petrie and Marco Ramirez talked about creating their version of the character following the film versions, with Ramirez saying, "even if you know the character, you've never seen him like this. That was the big thing we wanted. There are four movies, eight hours and four actors. We've seen this guy. We think we know who he is, but even we learned that he's so much more." Petrie said, "We hope to make people forget what they've seen before, whether they've loved it or not."

Petrie stated that Son of Sam, Bernard Goetz, and Travis Bickle from Taxi Driver were influences on the character, as well as current events, saying, "Taking lethal justice into your own hands in America in 2015 is tricky shit. We have not shied away from the rich complicated reality of Now. If you've got a gun and you're not the police you're going to incite strong feelings." He added that the writers hoped to "stir the pot" and "get people to think" when watching Punisher. Bernthal added that "This character has resonated with law enforcement and military [...] and the best thing about him is that if he offends you, he just doesn't care." In order to get in the correct mindset to portray Castle, Bernthal trained with military members, along with receiving weapon training. Bernthal also "had to put myself in as dark of place as possible" to connect with "the emptiness inside" Castle, and isolate himself, including walking across the Brooklyn Bridge to get to set "to shed any outside influence of joy."

Rosario Dawson, who felt Matt Murdock behaved like the Punisher in season one, felt it would "be really interesting to see how [the writers] differentiate" the two in the second season. Describing the character, Bernthal said, "As a man who put his [life] on the line and really went through the ultimate sacrifice for this country in his involvement in the military. He's a guy who brought the war home with him [in] the worst possible way. There are a lot of iterations of this character and in all of them it's a man who's gone through this unbelievable trauma and what's interesting about our take on him is how this trauma reshapes his own philosophy." Bernthal also talked about the character's "superpowers", saying, "If I got one thing from the comics, I think, as far as superpowers... his superpower is his rage. His superpower is that he is not going to quit, and he is going to go forward no matter what. And that's as human and grounded a quality as I think as this sort of genre could have".

Bernthal reprises the role in MCU productions produced by Marvel Studios, starting with the first season of Daredevil: Born Again.

=== Elektra Natchios ===
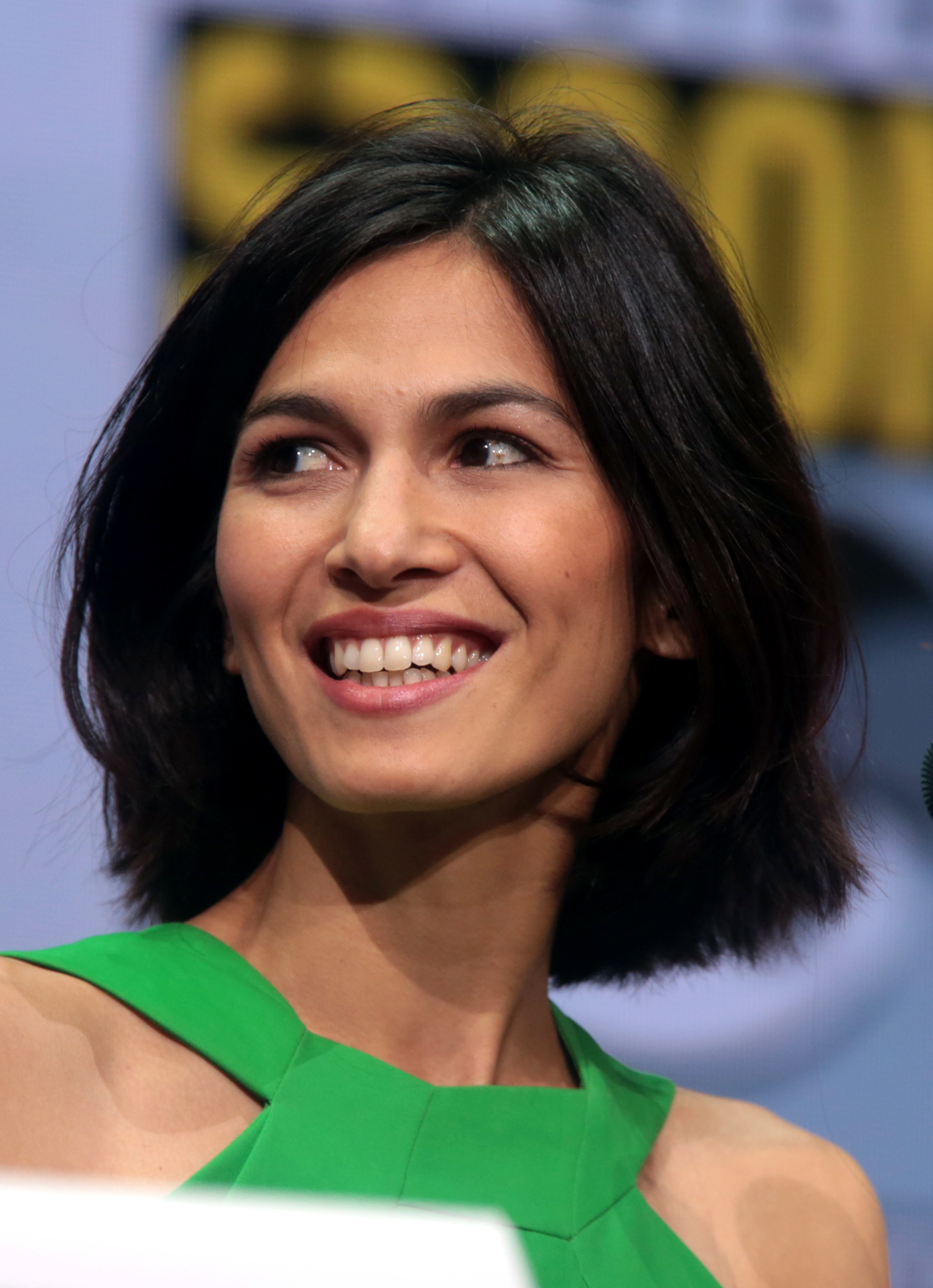
Élodie Yung

Elektra Natchios (portrayed by Élodie Yung) is a mysterious and dangerous woman from Murdock's past.

In July 2015, Marvel announced that Yung had been cast as Elektra for the second season, after the character had initially been referred to in the first season. Describing Elektra's effect on Murdock, Petrie called her "the best bad girlfriend you can possibly have. She does everything wrong and attractive, she's [Matt's] id, the wild side. Matt is always taming his wild side. Elektra just lets it out. He's both repulsed and deeply drawn to that." Talking about the character, Yung said, "What I tried to capture by reading the comics is I wanted to keep the coldness that Elektra has. And I had conversations at length with Doug [Petrie] and Marco [Ramirez]. We think Elektra is kind of a sociopath. This world is a game for her. It's like a chess game, and what motivates her is what she wants. She'll use anything she needs to use to get to her goal, and if she needs to kill people, she would." However, "we wanted to create a character with different layers. I think Elektra isn't a bad person. She's not a good person. She's a person with different traits, with layers, and she's seeking for who she is." Lily Chee plays a young Elektra.

Yung will reprise the role in the third season of Daredevil: Born Again.

=== Blake Tower ===
Blake Tower (portrayed by Stephen Rider) is a New York assistant district attorney under Samantha Reyes who assists Daredevil "with information to help track down and capture criminals." Following Samantha Reyes' death, Tower is sworn in as the new district attorney.

In September 2015, Rider joined the cast of the second season as Tower.

=== Maggie Grace ===
Margaret "Maggie" Grace (portrayed by Joanne Whalley) is a nun who cares deeply about Murdock's safety. She is revealed to be Murdock's estranged mother. Isabella Pisacane portrays a young Maggie when she is a novitiate.

=== Ray Nadeem ===
Rahul "Ray" Nadeem (portrayed by Jay Ali) is an honest and ambitious FBI agent. An original character made for the series, he worked with Daredevil when it comes to dealing with Wilson Fisk and Benjamin Poindexter. After he was killed by Dex on Vanessa's orders, the information Ray gathered was forwarded to the authorities by Karen and Foggy, after they picked it up from Ray's wife.

Ali was cast by March 2018.

=== Benjamin "Dex" Poindexter ===
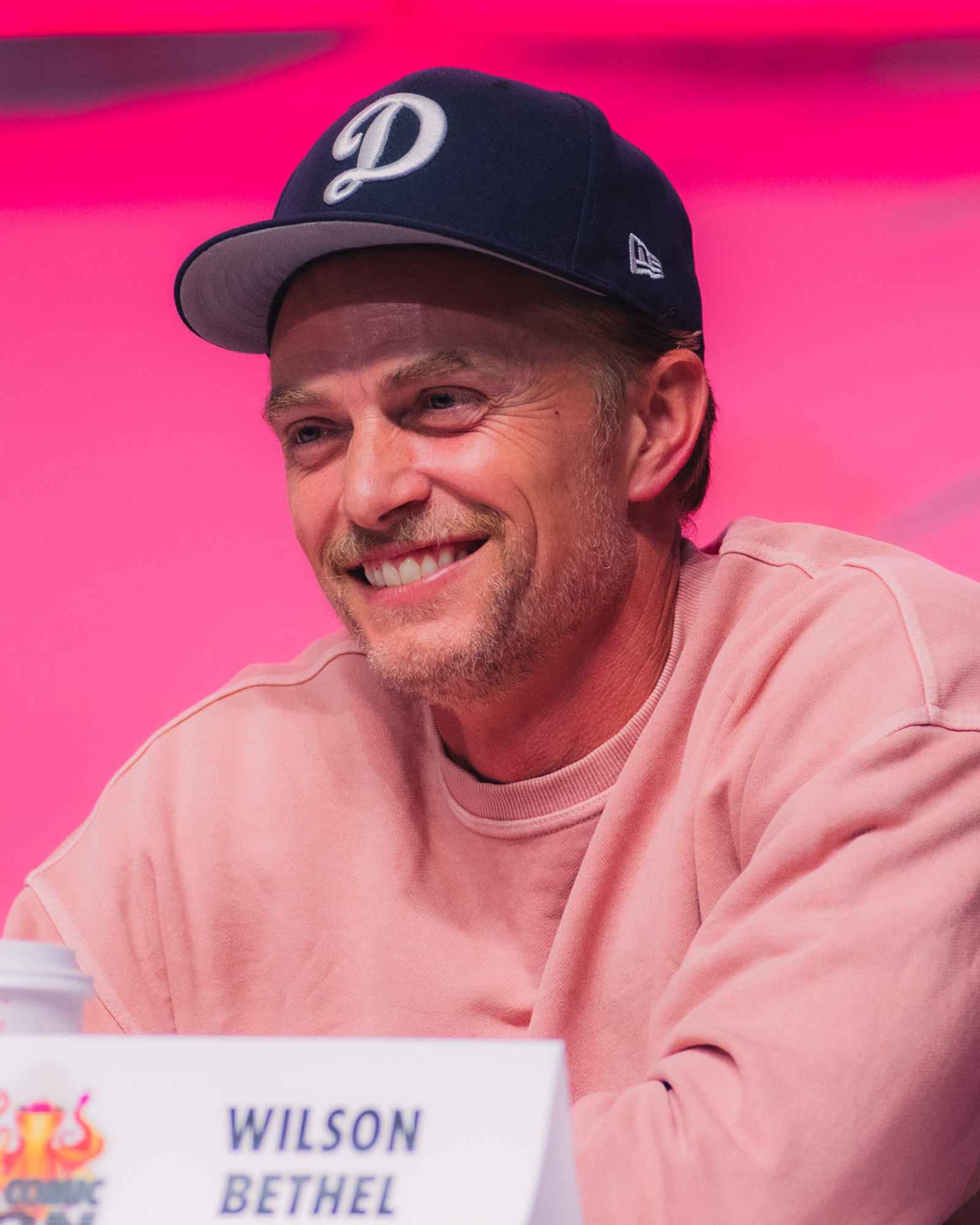
Wilson Bethel

Benjamin Leonard "Dex" Poindexter (portrayed by Wilson Bethel) is a psychopathic orphan and highly skilled marksman capable of using almost any object as a lethal projectile. Dex underwent psychiatric therapy for killing his baseball coach as a child and, following the death of his psychiatrist, joined the U.S. Army and later the FBI SWAT to keep his mental issues at bay until he is corrupted by Wilson Fisk into masquerading as Daredevil to ruin his reputation. After learning that he was manipulated, Dex turns on Fisk and is paralyzed, but undergoes an experimental surgery that enhances his body with Cogmium.

Bethel primarily portrays the character as an adult, while Cameron Mann and Conor Proft respectively play Dex in flashbacks as a child and teenager. Bethel was cast in November 2017, and reprises the role in Daredevil: Born Again, in which Dex returns as the assassin Bullseye.

== Recurring characters ==
=== Introduced in other TV series ===
==== Samantha Reyes ====
Samantha Reyes (portrayed by Michelle Hurd) is a New York District Attorney who goes against Nelson and Murdock for the People v. Frank Castle trial. This is due to her playing a role in Castle's family's deaths and covering them up. Reyes is killed by a sniper working for the Blacksmith.

Hurd reprises her role from Jessica Jones.

=== Introduced in season one ===
==== Paul Lantom ====
Father Paul Lantom (portrayed by Peter McRobbie) is a Catholic priest and confidante for Murdock. The character is based on a minor comic character who first appeared in Runaways Vol. 2 #9 (December 2005).

McRobbie appears throughout the series as Lantom. Series writer Ruth Fletcher Gage called Lantom "almost Matt's therapist. He was used in a lot of different ways. We wanted him to be someone who would actually discuss the things Matt brought to him." Writer Christos Gage added, "Father Lantom really was supposed to be a catalyst to force Matt to question his own view on things and his own feelings about what he was going to do."

In season 3, Father Lantom and Sister Maggie secretly take Matt in and nurse him back to health following the events of Midland Circle in The Defenders. Later in the season, when Karen makes herself a target of Fisk, he agrees to shelter her at the church. Dex attacks the church in an attempt to kill Karen, and in the course of the fight, Father Lantom is killed shielding her from one of Dex's batons. At the end of the season 3 finale, Matt gives a eulogy for Father Lantom in the church with Karen, Foggy, Marci, Ellison, Brett, and Tower all in attendance.

==== Turk Barrett ====
Turk Barrett (portrayed by Rob Morgan) is a small-time criminal working for Wilson Fisk whom Daredevil beats for information.

==== Brett Mahoney ====
Brett Mahoney (portrayed by Royce Johnson) is a police sergeant at the New York City Police Department's 15th Precinct who is friends with Matt Murdock and Foggy Nelson. Foggy regularly bribes him with cigars for his mother. He also is a reluctant ally of Matt's alter ego Daredevil, feeding him information on confidential matters. After Detective Carl Hoffman turns himself in and exposes the truth about Wilson Fisk, Mahoney was shown to have a pleased look on him as the FBI arrests Officer Corbin and his fellow corrupt police officers for their involvement with Wilson Fisk. He is promoted to the pay grade of Detective-Sergeant in "Regrets Only," after taking credit for the arrest of Frank Castle.

Johnson reprises the role in the second season of Daredevil: Born Again (2026).

==== Carl Hoffman ====
Carl Hoffman (portrayed by Daryl Edwards) is a detective with the New York City Police Department's 15th Precinct and partner of Christian Blake that is secretly on Wilson Fisk's side. After being forced to kill Blake on Wilson Fisk's orders, Hoffman goes into hiding with Leland Owlsey's help where he becomes a target of the police officers on Fisk's side. Upon being rescued by Daredevil, Hoffman turns himself over to Sgt. Brett Mahoney, leading to Fisk's exposure and the arrest of him and those involved at the hands of the FBI.

==== Christian Blake ====
Christian Blake (portrayed by Chris Tardio) is a corrupt detective with the New York City Police Department's 15th Precinct who is secretly in the employ of Wilson Fisk, and is partnered with Carl Hoffman. After Daredevil attacks him and grabs his phone, obtaining crucial information, Fisk arranges for Blake to be shot by an ESU sniper outside the scene of a standoff, along with two other officers. Blake survives and Fisk subsequently has Hoffman kill Blake by injecting a poison into his IV line. Hoffman's subsequent guilt over Blake's death leads him to turn against Fisk and snitch on him to the FBI.

==== Gao ====
Madame Gao (portrayed by Wai Ching Ho) is an accomplished older woman with her own heroin trade in Hell's Kitchen who allies with Wilson Fisk and Leland Owlsley, as well as being a boss in The Hand.

==== Nobu Yoshioka ====
Nobu Yoshioka (portrayed by Peter Shinkoda) is a Japanese businessman and head of a Yakuza branch who allies with Wilson Fisk. He is also a member of the Hand. Nobu is believed to be burned to death during a fight against Murdock. Nobu later returns, albeit heavily scarred, leading the Hand in their efforts to turn Elektra into the Black Sky. Nobu draws Daredevil and Elektra out by holding everyone Daredevil ever saved hostage. During the battle, Nobu unintentionally kills Elektra and is then flung off a roof by Murdock. Nobu once again revives, only to be stabbed in the chest and then decapitated by Stick.

It was originally reported by Deadline Hollywood that the name of Shinkoda's character would be "Hachiro", a name that was given to a different character in the second season. On the character's motivations, Shinkoda said, "I think that he's driven almost religiously, like Matt, except that the stakes may be higher for Nobu than Matt. The way I played it, I assumed he may be a member of The Hand, he's part of some program that's been going for hundreds of years. I think he has global plans. They're huge. They're not only affecting him." In the ninth episode of the first season, the writers almost introduced Kirigi as the opponent Murdock would face, instead of Nobu.

==== Vladimir Ranskahov ====
Vladimir Ranskahov (portrayed by Nikolai Nikolaeff) is a Russian mafia member trying to make a name for himself in America with his brother Anatoly. He is later killed by the police officers on Wilson Fisk's side while buying Daredevil time to get away.

==== Josie ====
Josie (portrayed by Susan Varon) is the owner of a bar frequented by Murdock, Nelson, and Page. Based on the comic character who first appeared in Daredevil #160 (September 1979).

Varon reprises her role in Daredevil: Born Again.

==== Doris Urich ====
Doris Urich (portrayed by Adriane Lenox) is the sick wife of Ben Urich. Despite being hospitalized, she gives her full support for her husband when he begins to investigate Wilson Fisk's crimes. After Ben is killed, Doris attends the funeral and reveals to Karen Page that Ben had set up a life insurance plan making her financially set for the rest of her life. Based on the comic character who first appeared in Daredevil #163 (March 1980).

==== Mitchell Ellison ====
Mitchell Ellison (portrayed by Geoffrey Cantor) is the Editor-in-Chief of the New York Bulletin and Ben Urich's boss. In the first season, he does not believe Urich's findings on Wilson Fisk's illegal activities. By the second season, Ellison helps Karen Page with info revolving around Punisher and Blacksmith and eventually offers Karen a job at the New York Bulletin. In season three, Ellison is injured by Dex Poindexter posing as Daredevil to which he later pressures Karen to reveal Daredevil's identity to him.

Cantor reprises the role in the second season of Daredevil: Born Again.

==== Shirley Benson ====
Shirley Benson (portrayed by Suzanne H. Smart) is an administrator at Metro-General Hospital.

==== Elena Cardenas ====
Elena Cardenas (portrayed by Judith Delgado) is one of the first clients of Nelson and Murdock. She lives in a housing tenement inhibiting Fisk's plan. Elena is later killed on the orders of Wilson Fisk.

There had been some intention for Cardenas' demise to be much more graphic, with the character being blown up and only her arms being found afterwards, though this was found to be "going too far". DeKnight explained, "We ended up killing her later to wrap it into the story. And at the time we were thinking 'We can't blow her up! That's too much!' And then of course eight months later I watch Jessica Jones and they blow up that old neighbor woman and all that's left is like an arm, and I'm thinking 'Hey, wait a minute!'"

==== Marci Stahl ====
Marci Stahl (portrayed by Amy Rutberg) is Foggy Nelson's girlfriend from college. She is known for her forthright personality and affectionately referring to Foggy as "Foggy Bear". At the start of season 1, she is introduced working at Landman & Zack, where she began working after Matt and Foggy quit their internships. After Matt and Foggy come into possession of evidence that the partners of Landman & Zack are working for Fisk, Foggy persuades Marci to help them by appealing to the fact that she "used to have a soul". Following Fisk's arrest, Marci gets hired on at Hogarth, Chao & Benowitz, later recommending Foggy to Jeri Hogarth when Nelson & Murdock closes in the fallout from the Punisher trial. Rutberg was "surprised" she was cast in the role, as she "had just had a baby and thought I would never work again."

In season 3, Marci is living together with Foggy, and has been there as a source of comfort for Foggy as he has nightmares about Matt's "death". When Fisk is released, Foggy is incensed to find that Blake Tower refuses to pursue a state case against Fisk because he's running for reelection. This leads Marci to suggest that Foggy run for District Attorney as a write-in candidate to bring Fisk's injustices into the spotlight. Later, after Foggy is nearly killed by Dex in an attack on the Bulletin, he begins looking into one of Marci's cases involving an IRS auditor being prosecuted for aiding the Albanians that Fisk had snitched on, which leads him to realize Fisk is planning to make himself the sole source of government protection for criminals in the city. At the end of the season, Marci is seen attending Father Lantom's funeral, sitting alongside Foggy. During the wake following the funeral, she is disappointed that Foggy has decided to concede the District Attorney race to Tower, but respects his desire to go back into business with Matt and Karen.

==== Stick ====
Stick (portrayed by Scott Glenn) is a mysterious martial artist and Matt Murdock's mentor, who is in his late 90s. He is the leader of the Chaste, who wages a war against the Hand and its quest to retrieve the Black Sky.

Marvel announced in September 2014 that Glenn was joining the series as Stick. DeKnight initially wanted Sonny Chiba for the role, "but that didn't quite work out." Glenn, who had been brought up in early conversations by the writers, was reconsidered following his performance in The Leftovers. Glenn had never played a blind character before, calling it a challenge to integrate the blindness, being a martial arts master, and the emotional aspect to the character. He also added that Stick was "on the high-volume side" of stunts for the show. To prepare for the role, Glenn had to "learn completely about the world of comic books [...] and who Stick [was] in relationship to the Daredevil."

==== Francis ====
Francis (portrayed by Tom Walker) is the head of Fisk's security who was charged with even protecting Vanessa Marianna. Following Fisk's arrest, Francis flees in a helicopter with Vanessa.

==== Melvin Potter ====
Melvin Potter (portrayed by Matt Gerald) is a machinist, designer, and armorer who makes armored suits. In season one, he's swayed to Wilson Fisk's services and later creates Daredevil's costume. In season two, Potter continues to upgrade the suit for Murdock and provides a suit for Elektra Natchios. In season three, Potter is tracked down by the fixer Felix Manning to provide Dex Poindexter's Daredevil outfit, eventually getting arrested for a parole violation.

=== Introduced in season two ===
==== Louisa Delgado ====
Louisa Delgado (portrayed by Marilyn Torres) is a nurse who works at Metro General Hospital with Temple. She is killed by members of the Hand.

==== Hirochi ====
Hirochi (portrayed by Ron Nakahara) is a high-ranking member of the Hand working as a Roxxon Corporation executive.

==== Stan Gibson ====
Stan Gibson (portrayed by John Pirkis) is a Roxxon Corporation accountant blackmailed by the Hand through their kidnapping of his son. Stan leads Daredevil to the Farm, a drug factory which also turns children into Hand members. Daredevil rescues his son and Gibson, his son, and the children to Metro-General Hospital. Gibson is killed by his son with a scalpel.

==== Benjamin "Big Ben" Donovan ====
Benjamin "Big Ben" Donovan (portrayed by Danny Johnson) is Fisk's new lawyer and assistant at Donovan and Partners.

=== Introduced in season three ===
==== Nicholas Lee ====
Nicholas Lee (portrayed by Stephen Rowe) is one of Fisk's lawyers.

==== Tammy Hattley ====
Tammy Hattley (portrayed by Kate Udall) is the Special Agent in Charge of the FBI and Ray Nadeem and Dex's superior. She later sides with Kingpin where she killed Winn so that Felix Manning can get Ray to cooperate with Kingpin. At one point in her life, she had two children where one of them was killed in a staged hit and run. As part of Ray's dying action, Daredevil exposed Kingpin's actions causing Hattley and those swayed to Kingpin's side to be arrested.

==== Seema Nadeem ====
Seema Nadeem (portrayed by Sunita Deshpande) is Ray Nadeem's wife.

==== Sami Nadeem ====
Sami Nadeem (portrayed by Noah Huq) is Ray Nadeem's son.

==== Wellers ====
Wellers (portrayed by Matthew McCurdy) is an FBI agent on Ray Nadeem's team serving as Fisk's protective detail.

==== Theo Nelson ====
Theo Nelson (portrayed by Peter Halpin) is Foggy Nelson's younger brother who has worked his whole life at his family's butcher shop.

==== Arinori ====
Arinori (portrayed by Don Castro) is an FBI agent on Ray Nadeem's team serving as Fisk's protective detail.

==== Julie Barnes ====
Julie Barnes (portrayed by Holly Cinnamon) is a young woman who used to work with Dex and is now obsessively stalked by him.

==== Lim ====
Lim (portrayed by Scotty Crowe) is an FBI agent on Ray Nadeem's team serving as Fisk's protective detail.

==== Doyle ====
Doyle (portrayed by Richard Prioleau) is an FBI agent on Ray Nadeem's team serving as Fisk's protective detail.

==== Johnson ====
Johnson (portrayed by David Anthony Buglione) is an FBI agent on Ray Nadeem's team serving as Fisk's protective detail.

==== O'Connor ====
O'Connor (portrayed by Sam Slater) is an FBI agent on Ray Nadeem's team serving as Fisk's protective detail.

==== Winn ====
Winn (portrayed by Andrew Sensenig) is an FBI agent on Ray Nadeem's team serving as Fisk's protective detail. He was killed by Tammy Hattley in order to get Ray to cooperate with Kingpin.

==== Felix Manning ====
Felix Manning (portrayed by Joe Jones) is Kingpin's fixer who is based on the character of the same name from Daredevil #230.

Felix was responsible for arranging for Vanessa to be moved to a safe location, made people "disappear," provided a new workshop for Melvin Potter so that he can make a duplicate Daredevil outfit for Benjamin Poindexter, and assisted Tammy Hattley into getting Ray Nadeem to cooperate with Kingpin. Under Vanessa's orders, Manning ordered Poindexter to kill Nadeem. Daredevil later interrogated him about Kingpin's plans. After being told about Kingpin's wedding to Vanessa, Daredevil left him hanging from a building and was taken away on a stretcher while in police custody.

==== Mrs. Shelby ====
Mrs. Shelby (portrayed by Kelly McAndrew) is Fisk's surveillance technician.

== Guest characters ==
The following is a supplementary list of guest stars that appear in lesser roles or make significant cameo appearances. The characters are listed by the MCU media or season in which they first appeared.

=== Introduced in other TV series ===
- Jeri Hogarth (portrayed by Carrie-Anne Moss; first appears in season two): A lawyer who hires Nelson after he breaks from Murdock.
- Rosalie Carbone (portrayed by Annabella Sciorra; first appears in season three): Acting boss of an Italian-American Mafia family and a criminal underworld "power player" who agrees to cooperate with the Kingpin.
- Strieber (portrayed by Ron Simons; first appears in season three): The captain of the NYPD 15th Precinct.

=== Introduced in season one ===
- "Battlin" Jack Murdock (portrayed by John Patrick Hayden): Matt Murdock's father, a professional boxer who was killed by Sweeney's men for refusing to take a dive while Matt is young.
- Anatoly Ranskahov (portrayed by Gideon Emery): A Russian trying to make a name for himself in America with his brother Vladimir. After interrupting a dinner date between Fisk and Vanessa, Anatoly is beheaded by Fisk with a car door.
- Silke (portrayed by Peter Gerety): A mobster and associate of Roscoe Sweeney.
- Corbin (portrayed by Angel Rosa): A corrupt police officer of the NYPD's 15th Precinct who is secretly on Wilson Fisk's side. He and his fellow corrupt police officers are later arrested by the FBI when Fisk's illegal activities are exposed.
- Semyon (portrayed by Alex Falberg): A Russian hitman employed by Anatoly and Vladimir.
- Santino (portrayed by Moisés Acevedo): Clare Temple's neighbor.
- Roscoe Sweeney (portrayed by Kevin Nagle): A fixer for the Hell's Kitchen Irish Mob who orchestrated Jack Murdock's death. During his teenage years, Murdock encountered Sweeney again and prevented Elektra from killing him. Instead, Murdock had him arrested.
- M. Caldwell (portrayed by Kassia Miller): A secretary at the New York Bulletin who was secretly a mole for Wilson Fisk. She was later arrested by the FBI when Fisk's illegal activities were exposed.
- Joseph Pike (portrayed by Kevin McCormick): An enforcer working for Fisk along with Stewart Schmidt. They attacked Karen Page, but were defeated by Foggy Nelson. Based on the comic character "Stymie" who first appeared in Daredevil #164 (May 1980).
- Stewart Schmidt (portrayed by Bryant Carroll): An enforcer working for Fisk along with Joseph Pike. They attacked Karen Page, but were defeated by Foggy Nelson. Based on the comic character "Wall-Eyed" who first appeared in Daredevil #165 (July 1980).
- Stone (portrayed by Jasson Finney, voiced by David Sobolov): An ally of Stick.
- Bill Fisk (portrayed by Domenick Lombardozzi): Wilson Fisk's abusive father, who was murdered by a young Wilson to protect his mother.
- Marlene Vistain (portrayed by Phyllis Somerville as an elderly lady, Angela Reed as a younger adult): Wilson Fisk's mother.
- Parish Landman (portrayed by Richard Bekins): The corrupt co-founder of the law firm Landman and Zack who is on Wilson Fisk's side. When Landman pulled into the parking lot of his firm, the FBI appeared and showed Landman a warrant for his arrest when Wilson Fisk's illegal activities were exposed.
- Randolph Cherryh (portrayed by Jonathan Walker): A corrupt senator on Wilson Fisk's payroll who is based on the comic character who first appeared in Daredevil #177 (December 1981). When Wilson Fisk's illegal activities were exposed, Senator Cherryh was arrested by the FBI who claims to the press that he and Fisk did nothing wrong.

Pat Kiernan appears as himself throughout the series, while Stan Lee makes a cameo appearance through an on-set photograph at the NYPD's 15th Precinct. In Iron Fist, Lee's character is identified as NYPD Captain Irving Forbush. Bonale Fambrini appears as a Black Sky.

=== Introduced in season two ===
- Jimmy "The Bear" (portrayed by John Bianco): A member of the Dogs of Hell biker gang.
- Nesbitt (portrayed by Andy Murray): Leader of the Hell's Kitchen Irish Mob gang known as the Kitchen Irish and Grotto's employer before his death at the hands of the Punisher. Based on the comic character who appeared in The Punisher Vol. 7 #10 (October 2004).
- Kelly Cooley (portrayed by Paul Drechsler-Martell): A member of the Kitchen Irish and the son of Finn Cooley. He is killed by Punisher.
- Elliot "Grotto" Grote (portrayed by McCaleb Burnett): A survivor of a Punisher attack on the Kitchen Irish seeking witness protection. Castle murders him when Murdock refuses to.
- Max (portrayed by Bull): A dog that once belonged to the Kitchen Irish before being adopted by Frank Castle.
- Jerry (portrayed by Ray Ianicelli): A war veteran.
- Finn Cooley (portrayed by Tony Curran): An Kitchen Irish mobster whose son is killed by the Punisher. He was killed by Punisher when he threatened Max. Curran previously portrayed Bor in Thor: The Dark World.
- Thompson (portrayed by Katt Masterson): Mahoney's partner when he is promoted to Detective Sergeant.
- Cynthia Batzer (portrayed by Deirdre Madigan): The judge assigned to the People v. Frank Castle trial.
- Gregory Tepper (portrayed by Eric Michael Gillett): The lead medical examiner on the Castle murders.
- Ray Schoonover (portrayed by Clancy Brown): Castle's commanding officer in the Marine Corps who became the drug lord "Blacksmith" and was responsible for the murder of Castle's family. He is killed by Frank, and later appears in a flashback cameo in The Punisher season 1.
- Brian Cooley (portrayed by Valentino Musumeci): The son of Finn Cooley and the brother of Kelly Cooley. During the Punisher's trial, Brian ranted about Punisher killing his dad causing Judge Batzer to have him removed from the courtroom and for the jury to disregard that outburst.
- Dutton (portrayed by William Forsythe): The "Kingpin" of an underground contraband ring in the jail where Fisk is being held before his trial. After an attempt to intimidate Fisk, Fisk eventually manipulates Frank into killing Dutton and his entire crew, then takes over Dutton's ring.
- Daniel Gibson (portrayed by Lucas Elliot Eberl): Stan's son who is an incubator for the Hand's chemical farm.
- Jacques Duchamps (portrayed by Gilles Marini): An associate of Stick's sent by him to kill Elektra.
- Star (portrayed by Laurence Mason): A member of the Chaste murdered by Stick to protect Elektra.

Allison Winn, Doug Plaut, Massiel Mordan, and Shari Abdul play incubators for the Hand's chemical farm alongside Daniel Gibson.

=== Introduced in season three ===
- Nihar Nadeem (portrayed by Fajer Kaisi): Ray Nadeem's brother.
- Saanvi Nadeem (portrayed by Nandita Shenoy): Ray Nadeem's sister-in-law and Nihar's cancer beating wife.
- Neda Kazemi (portrayed by Dina Shihabi): A woman who is rescued by Matt when he returns as Daredevil.
- Rostam Kazemi (portrayed by Chris Colombo): Neda's father who is rescued by Matt when he returns as Daredevil.
- Jasper Evans (portrayed by Matt DeAngelis): An Albanian hired by Fisk to stab him in prison. After being secretly released, Jasper is later killed by Dex posing as Daredevil.
- Anna Nelson (portrayed by Deirdre O'Connell): Foggy and Theo's mother.
- Edward Nelson (portrayed by Michael Mulheren): Foggy and Theo's father who runs Nelson's Meats.
- Timmy Nelson (portrayed by John Francis McNamara): Foggy and Theo's uncle.
- Jeanie Nelson (portrayed by Anne Carney): Foggy and Theo's aunt.
- Ruthie Nelson (portrayed by Arden Wolfe): Foggy and Theo's niece.
- Jonathan O'Reilly portrays Foggy and Theo's nephew.
- Ramsey (portrayed by Andy Lucien): An FBI agent on Ray Nadeem's team serving as Fisk's protective detail.
- Riggle (portrayed by Bill Winkler): The warden of Rikers Island.
- Lily Ellison (portrayed by Meredith Salenger): Mitchell Ellison's wife.
- Jason Ellison (portrayed by Chris Carfizzi): Mitchell Ellison's nephew who is set up with Karen.
- Michael Kemp (portrayed by Luke Robertson): An incarcerated criminal who was aided by Nelson & Murdock into getting his sentence reduced.
- Vic Jusufi (portrayed by James Biberi): The Albanian leader who is imprisoned at Rikers Island and plots revenge against Fisk for his betrayal. He had his men sneak Matt Murdock out of Rikers Island amidst the chaos.
- Bradley (portrayed by Gary Hilborn): Dex's supportive baseball coach from his youth.
- Eileen Mercer (portrayed by Heidi Armbruster): A therapist who works closely with Dex to control his emotions.
- Alvarez (portrayed by Kimberli Alexis Flores): An FBI agent on Ray Nadeem's team serving as Fisk's protective detail.
- Paxton Page (portrayed by Lee Tergesen): Karen's religious father living in Fagan Corners, Vermont and the proprietor of the restaurant "Penny's Place". Following Kevin's death which Sheriff Bernie Cohen covered up while consumed by Kevin's loss, Paxton advised Karen to take her leave while his restaurant was "closed until further notice". When Karen calls him up following the massacre at the Daily Bulletin, Paxton is relieved that Karen is not dead. When she asks if she can come home for a while, Paxton states that the timing is not great.
- Betsy Beatty (portrayed by Karina Casiano): Melvin Potter's parole officer and love interest who Fisk has threatened the life of in the past. After Potter was arrested and she had just busted someone for parole violation, Betsy was approached by Daredevil who told her about what happened to Potter and advised that she leaves town before those who used Potter come after her.
- John Hammer (portrayed by Ezra Knight): A criminal figure in New York.
- Everett Starr (portrayed by Ned Van Zandt): A criminal figure in New York. Killed by Dex when he refused Kingpin's offer.
- Latimer Zyl (portrayed by Stephen Axelrod): A criminal figure in New York.
- Sophia Carter (portrayed by Cori Dioquino): A criminal figure in New York.
- Bernie Cohen (portrayed by Robert Vincent Smith): The sheriff of Fagan Corners, Vermont who is a family friend of the Page family. After Kevin died in a car accident during an argument with Karen while she was driving, Bernie covered up the incident by stating that Kevin was driving..
- Kevin Page (portrayed by Jack DiFalco): The brother of Karen Page and the son of Paxton Page who died in a car accident while Karen was driving during their argument. His death was covered up by Sheriff Bernie Cohen by stating that Kevin was driving the car.
- Todd (portrayed by Will Strout): Karen Page's former boyfriend who she would sell drugs with.
- Esther Falb (portrayed by Lesley Ann Warren): The rightful owner of the Rabbit in a Snowstorm painting, who reclaims it once Fisk initially goes to prison. She was later murdered by Dex.
- Bess Mahoney (portrayed by Sharon Hope): Brett Mahoney's mother.
- Dr. Oyama (portrayed by Glenn Kubota): A surgeon who fixes Dex's spine after it was broken by Fisk.

Roy Thomas makes a cameo appearance in the episode "Blindsided" as a prisoner at Rikers who witnesses Kemp beat up Murdock under the alias of Foggy Nelson.

== See also ==
- The Punisher cast and characters
- Jessica Jones cast and characters
- Luke Cage cast and characters
- Iron Fist cast and characters
- The Defenders cast and characters
