= Wilson Bethel =

American actor and producer (born 1984)

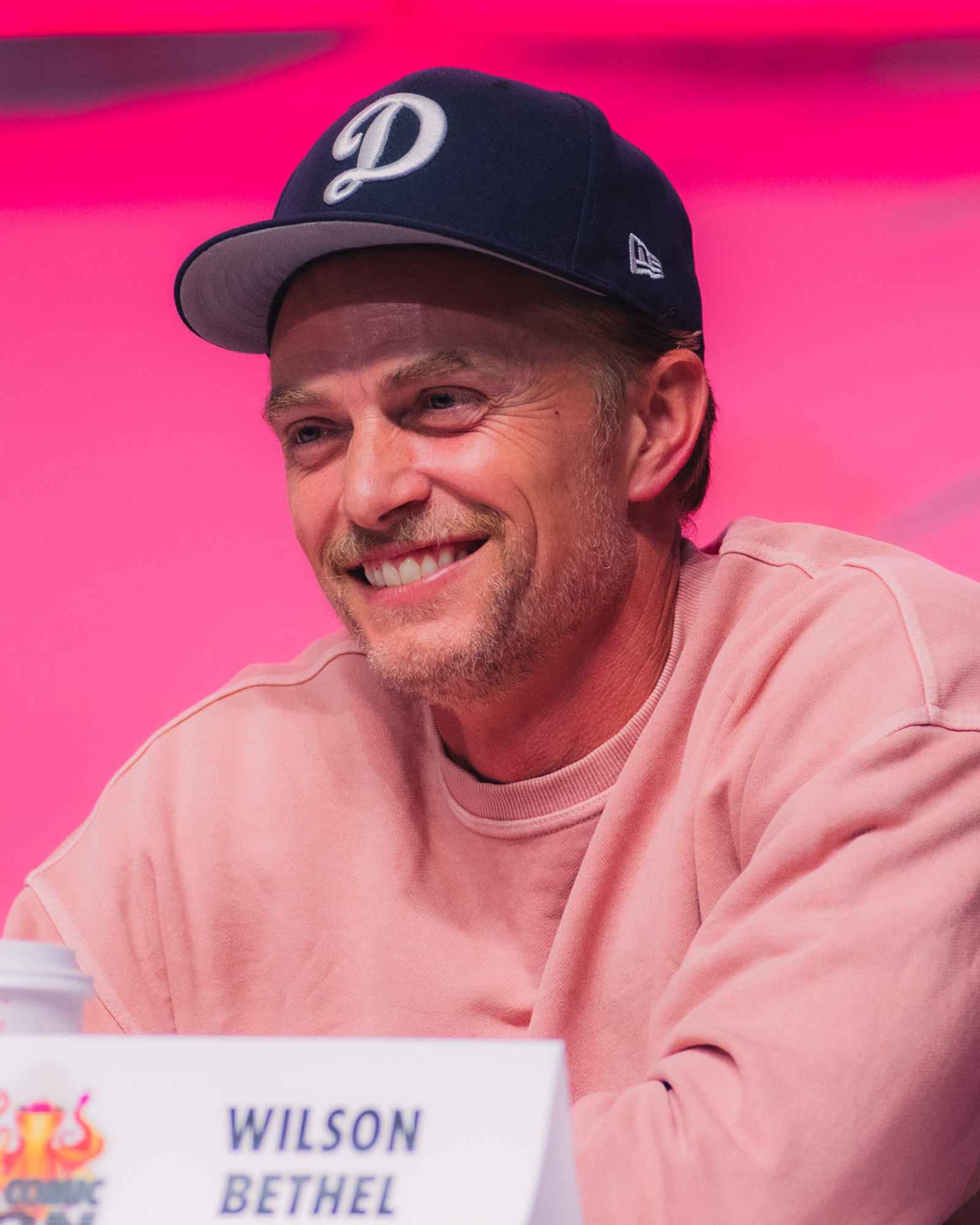
- Bethel in 2025
- Born: Stephen Wilson Bethel; February 24, 1984 (age 42); Hillsborough, New Hampshire, U.S.
- Occupation: Actor
- Years active: 2004–present
- Spouse: Liesl Bethel (m. 2020)
- Children: 1
- Mother: Joyce Maynard

Stephen Wilson Bethel (born February 24, 1984) is an American actor and producer. He is known for his roles as Ryder Callahan on the CBS daytime soap opera The Young and the Restless (2009–2011), Wade Kinsella on Hart of Dixie (2011–2015), Deputy district attorney Mark Callan on the legal drama All Rise (2019–2023), and as Benjamin "Dex" Poindexter / Bullseye in the third season of the Marvel Cinematic Universe series Daredevil (2018) and its revival series Daredevil: Born Again (2025–present). He is also the star and creator of the web series Stupid Hype on the CW's online platform CWD (CW Digital Studio).

== Career ==
Bethel debuted as Brad in the teen drama series The O.C., in the episode "The Telenovela". He had guest roles in JAG, Cold Case, and NCIS, and portrayed Corporal Evan "Q-Tip" Stafford in the Emmy-nominated mini-series Generation Kill, starring Alexander Skarsgård. Bethel made his film debut in the 2008 Vietnam War film, 1968 Tunnel Rats where he played the Army Special Ops soldier, Corporal Green. In 2009, he landed a recurring role as Ryder Callahan on the CBS daytime soap opera The Young and the Restless.

In The CW's comedy-drama series Hart of Dixie, Bethel played Wade Kinsella, "bad-boy" neighbor to the series' central character, Zoe Hart. Production for the show began in early 2011 and it premiered on September 26, 2011. The series concluded on May 7, 2015, after four seasons. BuddyTV ranked him #14 on its list of "TV's Sexiest Men of 2011"; in 2012 he was ranked #2 on the same list. He appeared in four episodes of ABC's legal thriller series How to Get Away with Murder as Charles Mahoney.

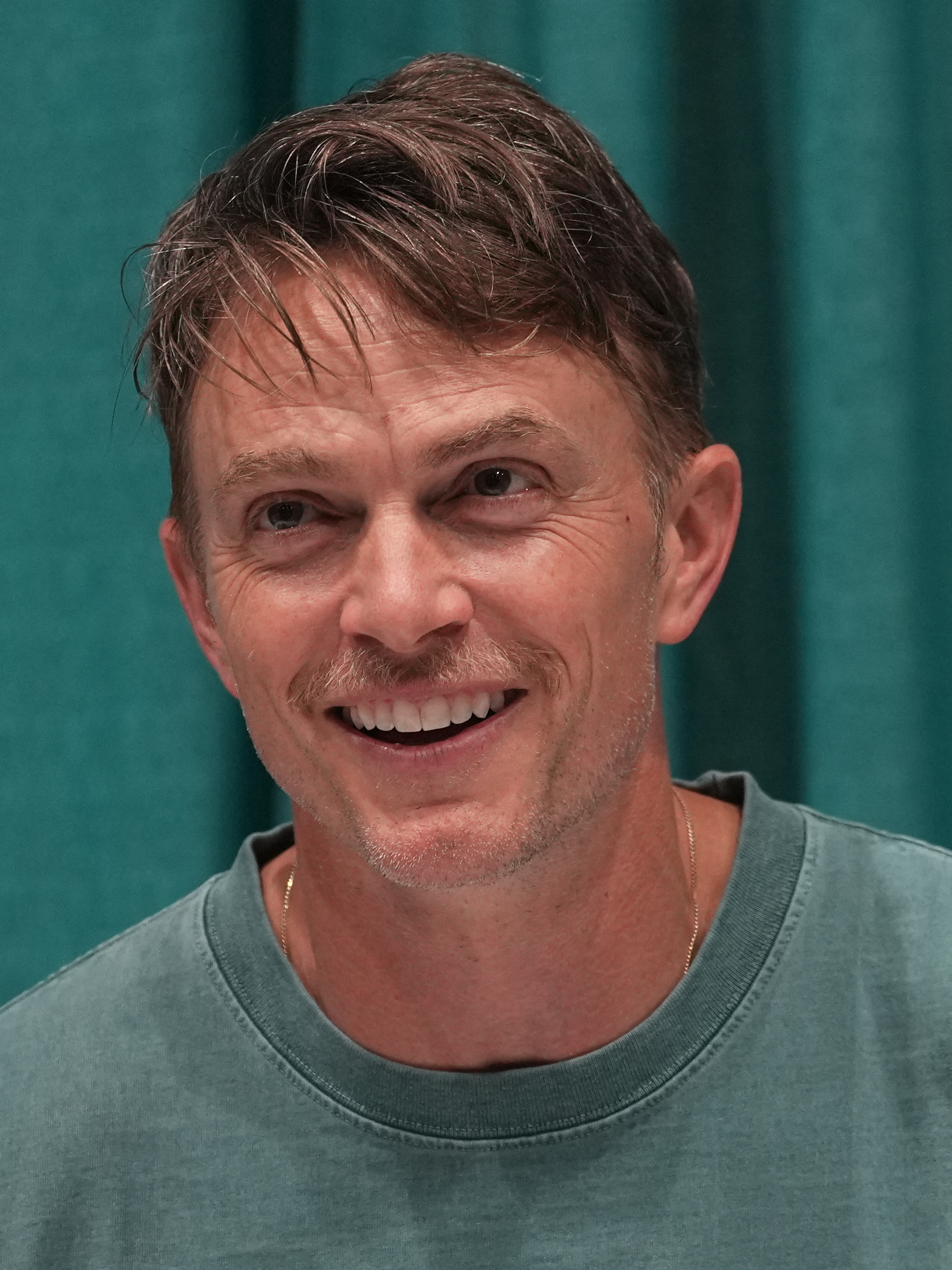
Bethel at GalaxyCon Oklahoma City in 2024

In 2017, he joined the Roundabout Theatre Company's production of The Last Match, which was set in the world of professional tennis. In 2018, he joined the cast of Daredevil as Benjamin "Dex" Poindexter, also known as Bullseye and reprised the role in Daredevil: Born Again (2025–present). In 2019, Bethel landed a main role on the CBS legal drama series All Rise as Deputy District Attorney Mark Callan.

== Personal life ==
Bethel was born on February 24, 1984, in Hillsborough, New Hampshire.

Bethel has identified as Jewish.

== Filmography ==
=== Film ===
Year	Title	Role	Notes
2008	1968 Tunnel Rats	Cpl. Dan Green	
2011	Stealing Summers	Trevor	
2012	Wyatt Earp's Revenge	Doc Holliday	Direct-to-video
2013	Not Today	Bill	
2013	Cold Turkey	Hank	
2014	Inherent Vice	LAPD Officer #1	
2021	Doors	Ricky	Science fiction anthology
2022	Collide	Travis	
2023	Match Me If You Can	Riley Detamore	
2026	A Sprinkle of History	Bert Baskin	
2027	F.A.S.T.		Post-production

=== Television ===
Year	Title	Role	Notes
2004	The O.C.	Brad	Episode: "The Telenovela"
2005	JAG	Seaman Apprentice Charles Bander	Episode: "Dream Team"
2005	NCIS	P.O. John Kirby	Episode: "Switch"; credited as "Wil Bethel"
2008	Generation Kill	Cpl. Evan 'Q-Tip' Stafford	Miniseries; 7 episodes
2008	Cold Case	James 'Jimmy' Tully	Episode: "Shore Leave"
2009–2011	The Young and the Restless	Ryder Callahan	Main cast; 78 episodes
2011	The Perfect Student	Trent	TV movie
2011–2015	Hart of Dixie	Wade Kinsella	Main cast; 76 episodes
2012	Reception	Greg	2 episodes
2013	Whose Line Is It Anyway?	Himself	1 episode
2013	Treme	Lanny Fox	Episode: "Dippermouth Blues"
2013	Stupid Hype	Hype	TV pilot; also executive producer and writer
2014	L.A. Rangers	Parker	Web series; Main cast; 5 episodes Executive producer and writer
2014–2017	American Koko	Salinger	3 episodes
2015	Bates Motel	Taylor	Episode: "Norma Louise"
2015	The Astronaut Wives Club	Scott Carpenter	Recurring role; 8 episodes
2015	Blood & Oil	Finn	3 episodes
2016	Criminal Minds	Randy Jacobs	Episode: "The Bond"
2016	Harley and the Davidsons	Ray Weishaar	Episode: "Race to the Top"
2016	The Infamous	Jason Gant	TV pilot
2016–2017	How to Get Away with Murder	Charles Mahoney	4 episodes
2018	Daredevil	Agent Benjamin "Dex" Poindexter	Main cast; 11 episodes
2019–2023	All Rise	Mark Callan	Main cast; 58 episodes Directed "Truth Hurts"
2025–2027	Daredevil: Born Again	Benjamin "Dex" Poindexter / Bullseye	Main cast; 10 episodes
2025	Untamed	Shane Maguire	Miniseries; 6 episodes
2026	Imperfect Women	Scott	Miniseries; 2 episodes

=== Audio ===
Year	Title	Role	Notes
2026	The Dead End Diner	Max	Main role
