= Royce Johnson =

American actor, screenwriter and filmmaker

Royce J. Johnson is an American actor, screenwriter, and filmmaker best known for his recurring role as Brett Mahoney in the Marvel Cinematic Universe television series Daredevil (2015–2018), Jessica Jones (2015), The Punisher (2017–2019), and Daredevil: Born Again (2026–present).

== Early life ==
Johnson was born Royce J. Johnson and graduated from Warren Easton High School in 1990 in New Orleans, Louisiana. Se estima que Royce Johnson nació al rededor de 1971-1972.

== Filmography ==
=== Film ===
Year	Title	Role	Notes
2007	Man-Up	Wade	Short, also story writer
2007	Blind Date	N/A	Crew member (loop group)
2010	Conspiracy X	Det. Bill	
2010	A Magic Helmet	Orderly	Short
2010	The Cycle	Kem	Short
2014	Let's Be Cops	N/A	ADR voice artist
2015	Demolition	Security Marty	
2017	Benji The Dove	Dave	
2017	Rich Boy, Rich Girl	Michael	
2017	Fair Market Value	Rashad	
2018	Ghost in the Graveyard	Sheriff D.	Post-production
2021	Last Call	Parker	
2025	The Snare	Ted	

=== Television ===
Year	Title	Role	Notes
2003	Queens Supreme	Cop	Episode: "Mad About You"
2003	Third Watch	Deputy	Episode: "Castles of Sand"
2004	Law & Order	Alan	Episode: "Cry Wolf"
2006	Law & Order: Criminal Intent	C.S.U. Tech	Episode: "Proud Flesh"
2006–2007	Kidnapped	Young FBI Agent / FBI Agent #2	2 episodes
2007	Law & Order	Ricky Bonner	Episode: "Bling"
2009	Life on Mars	Man in Uniform #1	Episode: "Home Is Where You Hang Your Holster" (uncredited)
2009	Cupid	Head Waiter	Episode: "My Fair Masseuse"
2009	Law & Order	Paramedic	Episode: "Great Satan"
2010	Rubicon	Suit #1	Episode: "Caught in the Suck"
2012	Law & Order: Special Victims Unit	Uni Cop #1	Episode: "Rhodium Nights"
2012	Person of Interest	Bike Messenger	Episode: "'Til Death"
2012	Gossip Girl	Cop #3	Episode: "New York, I Love You XOXO"
2013	Do No Harm	Dr. Mark Gower	Episode: "Don't Answer the Phone"
2013	Hostages	Agent Graham Adams	Episode: "Sister’s Keeper"
2013	The Blacklist	Agent Heller	Episode: "General Ludd (No. 109)"
2014	The Following	Cop	Episode: "Resurrection"
2014	Forever	Campus Security	Episode: "Look Before You Leap"
2014	Madam Secretary	Buddy	Episode: "Blame Canada"
2015–2018	Daredevil	Detective Sergeant Brett Mahoney	18 episodes; Recurring role
2015	Jessica Jones	Detective Sergeant Brett Mahoney	Episode: "AKA Top Shelf Perverts"
2017–2019	The Punisher	Detective Sergeant Brett Mahoney	9 episodes; Recurring role
2017	Blindspot	Sheriff Hannon	Episode: "Gunplay Ricochet"
2021	For Life	Andy Josiah	4 episodes
2022	FBI	Percy Jones	Episode: "Fostered"
2023	The Blacklist	Sergeant McGinly	Episode: "The Man in the Hat"
2024–2025	House of Payne	Councilman Dustman	3 episodes
2026	Chicago P.D.	Troy Hunter	Episode: "Restored"
2026–2027	Daredevil: Born Again	Chief Detective Brett Mahoney	2 episodes; Recurring role
