= Stephen Rider =

American actor (born 1979)

- Born: September 25, 1979 (age 46)
- Occupation: Actor
- Years active: 2007–present
- Known for: Playing DA Blake Tower in Marvel's Daredevil.
- Notable work: The Butler, Instinct, Luke Cage

Stephen Rider (born September 25, 1979) is an American film and television actor. He is known for playing Admiral Stephen W. Rochon in the film The Butler (2013), Eric Millworth in the ABC series Lucky 7 (2014), Blake Tower in the Marvel Cinematic Universe series Daredevil and Luke Cage (both 2016–2018) and Hank Grogan in the HBO series IT: Welcome To Derry (2025).

== Career ==
Rider was discovered by Denzel Washington in a play in 2006, and Washington brought him into his 2007 biographical drama film The Great Debaters, which was Rider's feature film debut.

In 2013, Rider played the role of Seeker Reed in the science fiction film The Host and later played the role of Admiral Stephen W. Rochon in the historical drama The Butler. Rider played the role of Eric Millworth in the ABC drama series Lucky 7. He also starred in the film Alpha Alert, also known as Event 15.

In 2015, Rider appeared in the Showtime comedy series Shameless as G-Dog. He also starred as Eli Cunningham in the CBS comedy series Battle Creek.

Rider appeared in the second season of Netflix's series Daredevil based on Marvel Comics, as Blake Tower, an Assistant District Attorney for New York City.

== Filmography ==
=== Film ===
| Year | Title | Role | Notes |
|---|---|---|---|
| 2007 | The Great Debaters | Paul Quinn Debater #2 | |
| 2012 | Safe House | CIA Analyst | |
| 2013 | The Host | Seeker Reed | |
| 2013 | The Butler | Admiral Stephen W. Rochon | |
| 2013 | Alpha Alert | Diego | |
| 2016 | The Dog Lover | News Reporter | |
| 2018 | The After Party | Rahmel | |
| 2020 | Becoming | Justin Moore | |
| 2020 | It's Time | Carver Phillips | |
| 2023 | What Lies Under the Tree | Detective Weeden | |

=== Television ===
| Year | Title | Role | Notes |
|---|---|---|---|
| 2012 | NCIS: Los Angeles | Jack Williams | Episode: "The Gold Standard" |
| 2014 | Lucky 7 | Eric Millworth | 3 episodes |
| 2015 | Battle Creek | Eli Cunningham | Episode: "Old Wounds" |
| 2015–2016 | Shameless | G-Dog | 3 episodes |
| 2016 | Harley and the Davidsons | William B. Johnson | Miniseries; episode: "Legacy" |
| 2016–2018 | Daredevil | Blake Tower | Main role; 12 episodes |
| 2016–2018 | Luke Cage | Blake Tower | Guest star; 2 episodes |
| 2017 | Elementary | Tyus Wilcox | 2 episodes |
| 2018–2019 | Instinct | Zack Clark | Recurring role; 18 episodes |
| 2020 | The Good Fight | Corporal Demarcus Laney | Episode: "The Gang Goes to War" |
| 2022 | FBI: Most Wanted | Greg Galson | Episode: "El Píncho" |
| 2025 | It: Welcome to Derry | Hank Grogan | Main role |
