= The Bail Project =

Non-profit organization for funding bail

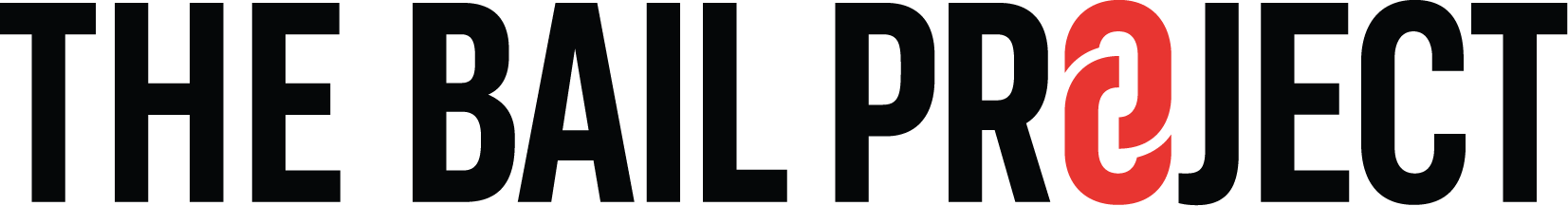
- Type: 501(c)(3) organization
- Founded: November 2017; 9 years ago
- Founder: Robin Steinberg
- Headquarters: Venice, California, U.S.
- Key people: David Gaspar (CEO)
- Website: bailproject.org

The Bail Project is a 501(c)(3) non profit organization aiming to pay bail for people who are not financially capable of doing so themselves. The Bail Project also provides pretrial services. The Bail Project was founded in 2017 by Robin Steinberg. In January 2018, the organization launched its first site as a national operation. As of 2020, it has 22 locations across the United States and has helped pay bail for over 12,000 people. The organization is governed by a board of directors and funded by private donations from individuals and philanthropic foundations. It publicly releases annual reports detailing its finances, operations, and impact metrics.

== Background ==
Critics of the bail system in the United States that question the ethics of the system. The Bail Project's position is that cash bail contributes to a two-tiered justice system in the United States where those with financial resources can secure pretrial freedom while poorer defendants remain incarcerated.

The Bail Project also criticizes the commercial bail industry, describing it as predatory, likening bail bonds to “predatory payday loans” that extract nonrefundable premiums and collateral from low-income families and incentivize incarceration to maintain profits. The organization supports alternatives such as court reminders and voluntary support services.

Defendants are referred to The Bail Project by a public defender, and from there, they are interviewed to determine if they should receive support from the organization. In addition to providing direct bail assistance and pretrial support, The Bail Project engages in policy advocacy aimed at reducing the use of cash bail and pretrial incarceration including testifying before state legislatures.

The organization's work has been profiled by national outlets including The New York Times, which examined how bail funds operate and influence pretrial outcomes, and NPR, which highlighted the expansion of charitable bail funds and their role in criminal justice reform.

== History ==
The Bail Project was founded in 2017 by Robin Steinberg, who is also the founder of The Bronx Defenders. In her time as a public defender, Steinberg found that when a judge would set bail and her client did not have the money, they would often plead guilty even if they were innocent. This motivated Steinberg to push The Bail Project forward as a way of challenging the cash bail system.

Robin Steinberg stepped down as CEO on March 6, 2023, and was succeeded by David Gaspar, who had served as the organization’s National Director of Operations. Gaspar, who is the first formerly incarcerated person to lead the organization, began his career at The Bail Project as a bail disruptor and rose through roles including site manager and regional director before becoming CEO.

== Work ==
According to their 2024 annual report, The Bail Project has posted $91 million in bail with the help of donations, and has helped 34,525 people since 2018. The Bail Project also provides pretrial support, including making sure that clients are aware of their court dates.

The Bail Project employs individuals who have been incarcerated in the past and work to help others during their difficult times.

=== Notable cases ===
In 2018, The Bail Project posted bail for a 33-year-old man in Los Angeles after he had been accused of robbery with bail set at $30,000. His case was dismissed with no evidence of the robbery. In San Diego, the Bail Project paid bail for over 700 immigrants in 2018. In April 2019, the Bail Project posted Samuel Scott's $5,000 dollar bond imposed with his charge of domestic violence. Following his return home, Scott beat his wife to death. In Kentucky, the Bail Project paid the $1,500 bond for Demontez Campbell after he missed a court date and was issued a bench warrant.

After the COVID-19 outbreak, The Bail Project set up a number of releases from Cook County Jail in Chicago. As of April 4, 2020, 60 inmates were projected to be released and between 500 and 1,000 were expected to be released within the following weeks. In Louisville, Kentucky, The Bail Project assisted with the release of Black Lives Matter protesters by posting bail. In Indianapolis, The Bail Project posted the bail of 20 protestors as of June 2020, and has supported 400 people. The Bail Project had a tent located in downtown Indianapolis and has provided support for over 500 people in the city.

As of March 2023, The Bail Project has posted bail for about 1,000 clients in Cuyahoga County jails.

== Criticism and consequences ==
In April 2019, The Bail Project's St. Louis branch paid bail for Samuel Scott, who was charged with domestic violence; following his return home, Scott beat his wife to death. Robin Steinberg, then CEO, commented: "No one could have predicted this tragedy. It's important to remember that had he been wealthy enough to afford his bail, or bonded out by a commercial bail bond agency, he would have been free pretrial as well."

Christopher Stewart, who was caught illegally with a handgun and threatened to kill his ex-girlfriend, was bailed out with $5,000 in cash in early 2020. A month after his bail, he attempted to kill his ex-girlfriend by setting her apartment on fire. In an interview, Stewart's ex-girlfriend expressed that: "They need to do better if they are going to have a charity bail people out. That's wasting money that could have gone to someone who would have done right by it."

Travis Lang, who was previously being held in jail for possession of cocaine in addition to three other felony charges, including breaking and entering, resisting arrest and burglary was bailed out by The Bail Project in January 2021. Lang resumed selling drugs and on October 1, 2021, and later shot and killed Dylan McGinnis. The Bail Project states that they were not immediately responsible for Mr. Lang's release. An organizational spokesperson stated: "Mr. McGinnis’ death is undeniably tragic, however, in this case, the lawsuit is misguided. Our association with Mr. Lang occurred in January 2021... It was 10 months and two bonds between the time of The Bail Project’s involvement with Mr. Lang and the death of Mr. McGinnis.”

Another person whose bond was paid by the Bail Project is Marcus Garvin. Garvin was charged with battery after stabbing a customer in the parking lot of a convenience store where he was working as a clerk. Following his release, he was soon charged with stabbing his girlfriend 51 times and dismembering her body. CEO (then National Director of Operations) David Gaspar said: “As tragic as that particular event was, it still is a very small percentage of the reflection of the work that we do... We can’t predict human behavior... We make our best assessments. This just happens to be an example of a tragic event.”

Rashawn Gaston-Anderson, a serial criminal who was arrested for burglary and theft, was released from jail after The Bail Project paid his $3,000 bail. Less than a week after Gaston-Anderson was released from the Las Vegas jail, he shot a waiter, Chengyan Wang, eleven times. Wang survived the attack and is currently suing The Bail Project for a claimed lack of due diligence. The Bail Project has since closed its Las Vegas chapter due to restructuring and the lawsuit was dismissed, with the judge ruling that the organization could not have reasonably foreseen the crime.

Donnie Allen was charged with aggravated murder of a passenger at a Cleveland light rail station on December 14, 2025, five days after The Bail Project posted Allen’s bond. Allen had been arrested 10 times since 2019 and has previously either pleaded guilty or was convicted of multiple counts of burglary, assault on a peace officer, obstructing official business, resisting arrest and drug possession.

== See also ==
- Chicago Community Bond Fund
- The Bronx Defenders
- The Bronx Freedom Fund
