= The New Inquiry =

Online magazine of cultural and literary criticism

- First issue's cover
- Editor-in-Chief: Ayesha Siddiqi
- Categories: Politics, social issues, culture
- Frequency: Monthly
- Founded: 2009
- Company: The New Inquiry, Inc.
- Country: United States
- Based in: New York City
- Website: thenewinquiry.com

The New Inquiry is an online magazine of cultural and literary criticism, established by Mary Borkowski, Jennifer Bernstein and Rachel Rosenfelt in 2009 and administered as a 501(c)(3) nonprofit organisation. The magazine's website updates daily, and every few weeks a new edition of the magazine is published as a PDF.

== Bail Bloc ==
In 2017, The New Inquiry launched Bail Bloc, a Monero cryptocurrency mining application that raises funds to pay bail for those otherwise unable to afford it, with the money dispersed through The Bronx Freedom Fund.

== Reception ==
Alex Williams of The New York Times called the organization "an Intellectuals Anonymous of sorts for desperate members of the city’s literary underclass barred from the publishing establishment". Sasha Frere-Jones in The New Yorker called it "one of the rare publications that has succeeded in becoming an intellectual journal that can draw people in, that poses large theoretical questions without sliding back into the iron mountain of academia". Matthew Yglesias of Vox called it "the most literal descendent of the small magazines of yore, but the seminar room is now drastically more diverse."
