= Sex industry in prisons in the United States =

About 220,000 women are incarcerated in the United States. Over 30% of them are convicted prostitutes. Much of the research on the sex industry in prisons focuses on women's experiences because jailed female sex workers greatly outnumber male ones. Prominent issues that the criminal justice system and women who are incarcerated on prostitution charges face include the sexually transmitted infections and diseases epidemic, the sex-work-prison cycle, and the prison-to-sex-trafficking pipeline. Intervention and diversion programs both in prisons and in traditional and specialty courts aim to address these issues, decrease recidivism, and give these women resources to help them leave the sex trade. Various community-based organizations seek to help resolve these concerns.

== Prevalence ==
According to the Office of Justice Programs, the typical incarcerated sex worker is a young, poor, single mother with little job experience and low self-esteem. Most are women of color who have a history of drug or alcohol abuse. They experience intimate partner violence at higher rates than women who have not been arrested for sex work.

An estimated 56%–82% of female victims of lifetime sexual abuse were found to be incarcerated on prostitution charges, with sexual victimization having a more prominent effect on likelihood of conviction for prostitution for women than men. Those who experienced sexual abuse at some point in their lives have greater recidivism rates. Additionally, jailed female prostitutes experience more mental illness, with "depressive disorders, post-traumatic stress disorder, and substance use disorders" the most prevalent. There is evidence that sexual abuse and mental illness are linked.

Estimates have found that there are about one to two million sex workers in the U.S., 80% of them women. Women are disproportionately imprisoned and sentenced on prostitution charges; men are more likely to be fined or sentenced to probation.

== Issues ==
=== Sexually transmitted infections and diseases epidemic ===
Following this centuries-long practice, incarcerated women may be routinely tested for sexually transmitted infections and diseases, depending on state guidelines. Chlamydia, gonorrhea, and HIV have been noted as frequently occurring STIs throughout U.S. prisons and have become increasingly prevalent in recent decades. Incarcerated female sex workers were found to have greater chlamydia infection rates than women convicted of other crimes.

=== Sex-work-prison cycle ===
One of the most complex issues that sex workers' rights organizations and criminal justice system officials are trying to address is the cycle of recidivism upon release from prison. Often, the jobs most accessible and available to formerly incarcerated people are low-paying or minimum wage, and ex-convicts of sex work note that they often cannot afford to support their lifestyle. About half of formerly incarcerated women reported that they returned to sex work to supplement their income. When they return to sex work, their chances of being arrested increase, and from this a cycle of sex work and arrests begin. Since 2000, many states have begun to offer programs that seek to end this cycle and support women as they leave the sex trade for good.

=== Sex trafficking pipeline ===
There are some reports of a prison-to-sex-trafficking pipeline in Florida, Massachusetts, and Chicago. Most of these women are domestically born. Coming out of prison, they may seek companionship or lack the means to sustain themselves immediately, and so agree to live with men who promise them relationships or claim to host a group of formerly incarcerated women. Often, these relationships are established during the women's prison stay, with promises of being taken care of and provided for upon being released. Instead, pimps such as Richard Rawls hold ex-convicts captive and force them to engage in sex work, often supplying the women with drugs.

== Solutions ==
=== Intervention and diversion programs ===
Cities such as Baltimore offer intervention programs that aim to train prison staff to work with women jailed on prostitution charges, decrease recidivism, and give them the skills and opportunities they need to set themselves up for self-sufficiency once they leave prison. A 2019 study found that these programs usually fail.

One of the newest intervention programs is the creation of specialty (or problem-solving) courts, which were modeled on mental health and drug treatment courts. Problem-solving courts seek to decrease the caseload of traditional courts by focusing on a specific area of crime. These aim to use highly specialized experts on the experiences of sex workers, sexual abuse, grooming, homelessness, trauma, and drug use to create a personalized and accurate treatment program for each sex worker who enters the system. This can mean probation, court-mandated supervision, addiction treatment, workshops, community engagement, and other social services. These community services can include counseling, free education, job and skills training, job referrals, mentoring, and housing both for emergencies and for those trying to exit the sex trade who need temporary accommodations. When convicts complete their treatment program successfully within 90 days to six months, the charges are expunged from their criminal record.

Another method of intervention is the court-affiliated prostitution diversion program, in which unspecialized criminal courts collaborate with multiple judges to send convicted sex workers to a less customized court-ordered intervention. While not always preventing jail time, these programs seek to decrease chances of future arrests and encourage sex workers to leave the trade through supervision, counseling, job placement, literacy training, and other social services.

The most success has been found with programs that ensure a wide variety of social services in one location and that the sex worker is incarcerated as briefly as possible. Specialty courts have been the most effective at lowering recidivism rates.

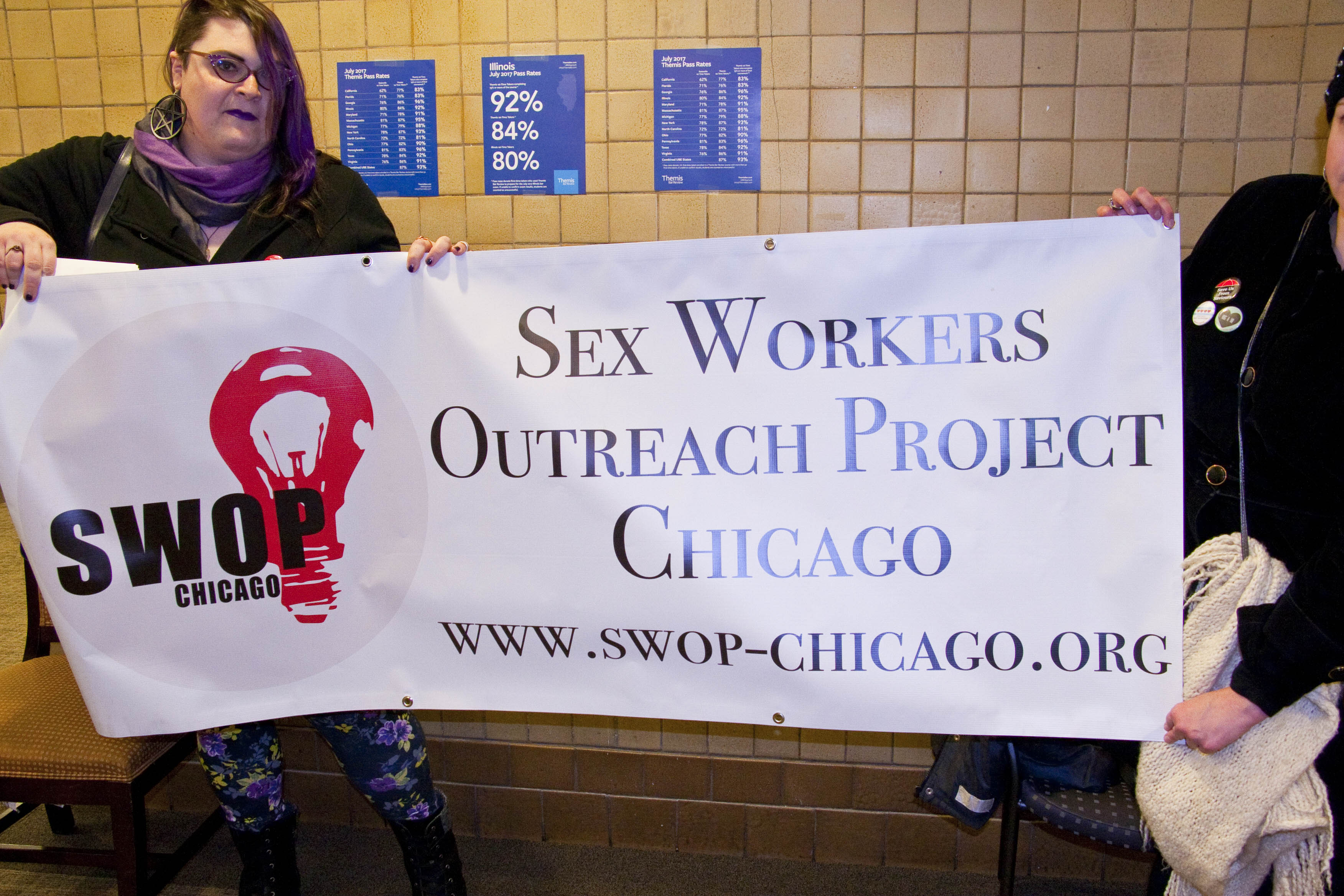
SWOP Behind Bars in Chicago outreach

=== Organizations ===
==== SWOP Behind Bars ====
SWOP (Sex Worker Outreach Project) Behind Bars is a U.S. grassroots sex worker rights organization that aims to highlight the needs and issues incarcerated sex workers and human trafficking victims face. It supports decriminalization of sex work and provides community resources to enhance educational opportunities, host a bail fund for jailed sex workers, and provide mentors and support to sex workers leaving the field.

==== Global Network of Sex Work Projects ====
NSWP is a collection of local, state, and national sex-worker-led groups that advocate against criminalization of sex work. It engages in research on the variety of sex workers' experiences, leads rallies, and holds conferences for leading figures in the debates over how to address sex work legally, economically, and socially.
