= Daredevil: Born Again season 1 =

Daredevil: Born Again
- Season 1
- Promotional poster
- Showrunner: Dario Scardapane
- Starring: Charlie Cox; Vincent D'Onofrio; Margarita Levieva; Deborah Ann Woll; Elden Henson; Wilson Bethel; Zabryna Guevara; Nikki M. James; Genneya Walton; Arty Froushan; Clark Johnson; Michael Gandolfini; Ayelet Zurer; Kamar de los Reyes; Jon Bernthal; Mohan Kapur; Tony Dalton
- No. of episodes: 9

Release
- Original network: Disney+
- Original release: March 4 – April 15, 2025

Season chronology
- Next → Season 2

The first season of the American television series Daredevil: Born Again is based on Marvel Comics featuring the character Daredevil. It sees blind lawyer and former vigilante Matt Murdock's fight for justice put him on a collision course with former mob boss Wilson Fisk, who is elected mayor of New York City. Set in the Marvel Cinematic Universe (MCU) and sharing continuity with the films and television series of the franchise, Born Again is a revival and continuation of Marvel Television and Netflix's Daredevil (2015–2018). The season was produced by Marvel Studios under its own Marvel Television label, with Dario Scardapane as showrunner and Justin Benson and Aaron Moorhead as lead directors.

Charlie Cox reprises his role as Matt Murdock / Daredevil from Marvel's Netflix television series and prior Marvel Studios productions, starring alongside Vincent D'Onofrio (Fisk), Margarita Levieva, Deborah Ann Woll, Elden Henson, Wilson Bethel, Zabryna Guevara, Nikki M. James, Genneya Walton, Arty Froushan, Clark Johnson, Michael Gandolfini, Ayelet Zurer, Kamar de los Reyes, Jon Bernthal, Mohan Kapur, and Tony Dalton. Development on a new Daredevil series began by March 2022, with head writers Matt Corman and Chris Ord giving it an episodic structure and lighter tone than the original series. Born Again was announced in July 2022 with a planned 18-episode first season. Filming began in March 2023 in New York, with Michael Cuesta, Jeffrey Nachmanoff, and David Boyd directing blocks of episodes. Filming was suspended in June due to the 2023 Writers Guild of America strike. Marvel Studios decided to overhaul the series by late September and released Corman, Ord, and the remaining directors. Scardapane, Benson, and Moorhead were hired to rework Born Again and connect it to the Netflix series. They added a new pilot, two additional episodes, and serialized elements. Filming for the nine-episode first season resumed in January 2024 and wrapped in April, with Nachmanoff and Boyd returning to assist Benson and Moorhead. Cuesta, Nachmanoff, and Boyd retained credit for their episodes.

The first season premiered on the streaming service Disney+ on March 4, 2025, with its first two episodes. The other seven episodes were released through April 15, as part of Phase Five of the MCU. Viewership was estimated to be high, and reviews from critics were generally positive. They highlighted the character-driven storytelling and performances, particularly those of Cox and D'Onofrio, but there were mixed feelings on how the season compares to the original Daredevil series, and many critics acknowledged that the seams of the creative overhaul are visible. The season received several accolades, including a Saturn Award nomination. A second season was confirmed in August 2024.

== Episodes ==
No. overall	No. in season	Title	Directed by	Written by	Original release date
1	1	"Heaven's Half Hour"	Aaron Moorhead & Justin Benson	Dario Scardapane	March 4, 2025
Matt Murdock and his friends and legal partners Foggy Nelson and Karen Page celebrate the retirement of their NYPD associate Cherry at Josie's Bar. They are attacked by their old enemy Benjamin "Dex" Poindexter, who kills Nelson. An enraged Murdock, as the masked vigilante Daredevil, attempts to kill Dex by dropping him from a roof; Cherry sees that Murdock is Daredevil. A year later, Murdock has retired as Daredevil and formed a new law firm with former district attorney Kirsten McDuffie. Page has moved to San Francisco, and Dex is given a life sentence for his crimes. McDuffie sets Murdock up with therapist Heather Glenn and they begin dating. After taking time away to recover from a vigilante attack, (Note: As depicted in the series Hawkeye (2021) and Echo (2024)) former mob boss Wilson Fisk announces that he is running for mayor of New York City with an anti-vigilante agenda. In a meeting, Murdock promises to stop Fisk if he steps out of line while Fisk says there will be consequences if Murdock resumes his vigilante activities. After winning the election, Fisk tells his wife Vanessa that he knows she had an affair with a man named Adam while he was away.
2	2	"Optics"	Michael Cuesta	Matt Corman & Chris Ord	March 4, 2025
Hector Ayala comes across two men, Connor Powell and Kel Shanahan, beating up Nicky Torres in a subway station. Ayala attempts to break up the fight and Torres runs away. When Shanahan trips and is killed by a train, Powell reveals that they are police officers and arrests Ayala for murder. Murdock, using his heightened senses, believes Ayala's story and decides to represent him. Cherry, now working as Murdock's investigator, learns that Ayala is the vigilante White Tiger. Murdock convinces the judge in Ayala's case to withhold this information, believing it would unfairly bias the jury. To improve optics during his first days as mayor, Fisk meets with young journalist BB Urich who reveals that popular NYPD Commissioner Gallo is poised to resign in protest of Fisk becoming mayor. Fisk threatens to expose Gallo's infidelity to stop him from resigning. Fisk and Vanessa start attending couples' therapy with Glenn. Murdock tracks down Torres and helps him escape from Powell and another corrupt police officer. The corrupt officers have tattoos of a skull, the symbol of the lethal vigilante Frank Castle / Punisher.
3	3	"The Hollow of His Hand"	Michael Cuesta	Jill Blankenship	March 11, 2025
Fisk and Vanessa avoid their previous criminal activities while Fisk is mayor. Two leaders of New York City's gangs, Luca and Viktor, begin to fight among themselves. Fisk believes they should let the gangs kill each other to help build a lasting peace, but Vanessa is frustrated that her work is being undone. She sends Fisk's right-hand man Buck Cashman to order Luca to pay $1.8 million restitution to Viktor. Cherry brings Torres to testify at Ayala's trial, but Torres is intimidated by the police and says he was never assaulted. With no other options, Murdock reveals Ayala's identity as the White Tiger in court. He is criticized by the judge and district attorney Benjamin Hochberg for his hypocrisy. With new witness accounts and police records detailing Ayala's heroic deeds as White Tiger, Murdock and McDuffie successfully convince the jury to find Ayala not guilty. In an interview with BB, Fisk denounces the trial's results and vows to uphold his anti-vigilante stance. Despite Murdock's warning that Ayala should stop being White Tiger, Ayala goes out on patrol and is murdered by a man wearing the Punisher's symbol.
4	4	"Sic Semper Systema"	Jeffrey Nachmanoff	David Feige and Jesse Wigutow	March 18, 2025
Murdock is confronted by Ayala's niece, Angela del Toro, who believes the police are responsible for Ayala's death. Murdock comforts her with hope that the killer will be brought to justice. At marriage counseling, Fisk and Vanessa discuss her affair with Adam and Glenn privately asks Vanessa if she feels safe around Fisk. Fisk's plan to rebuild the Red Hook port faces several hurdles, including bureaucratic procedures, gang in-fighting, and his protégé Daniel Blake drunkenly leaking details to BB who reports that Fisk is a union buster. Despite his anger, Fisk decides not to fire Blake when the latter expresses his deep loyalty. Murdock investigates the site of Ayala's murder and finds a bullet casing with the Punisher's symbol on it. He tracks down Castle and suggests he take responsibility for those who are misusing the Punisher symbol. Castle calls out Murdock for not ensuring Dex's death as retribution for Nelson's death. Later that night, Murdock practices with his Daredevil billy clubs, Fisk eats dinner next to an imprisoned Adam, and the masked serial killer Muse drains blood from a victim.
5	5	"With Interest"	Jeffrey Nachmanoff	Grainne Godfree	March 25, 2025
On Saint Patrick's Day, Murdock goes to New York Mutual Bank to discuss a loan for his law firm. His application is denied by assistant bank manager Yusuf Khan due to the firm's penchant for taking on clients who cannot afford to pay. Soon after Murdock leaves, a group of criminals led by Devlin enter the bank and take everyone hostage. They work for Luca and are attempting to steal the $1.8 million he needs to pay to Viktor. Murdock hears them and returns to the bank. When the police arrive, Devlin talks with hostage negotiator Detective Angie Kim. Murdock takes out two of the robbers while Khan stalls for time at the bank vault. Murdock opens the vault and they find a rare diamond that the robbers are targeting. Murdock pretends to give the diamond to Devlin as the police enter the bank. Devlin gives the parcel to an accomplice among the hostages, who later realizes that she does not have the diamond. Devlin disguises himself as a police officer and leaves, but is caught and injured by Murdock. Later, Murdock secretly returns the diamond and accepts an offer to have dinner with Khan's family.
6	6	"Excessive Force"	David Boyd	Thomas Wong	March 25, 2025
After the failed robbery, Luca visits Fisk and refuses to pay the $1.8 million to Viktor. Fisk raises the amount to $2.8 million and gives Luca a week to pay it. He then learns from the city's sanitation department that Muse is using human blood in his street art. Muse later leaves the bodies of two victims next to a new mural as public confirmation of his actions. Fisk learns of this during a fundraiser with the city's elites, including socialite Jack Duquesne, who are against his Red Hook plans. To deal with Muse, Fisk establishes an Anti-Vigilante Task Force (AVTF) with additional powers and recruits notorious police officers such as Powell and former detective Cole North. Angela believes Ayala was investigating Muse before his death and asks Murdock to continue his work. When Murdock refuses, she goes herself and is abducted by Muse. Alerted to her disappearance, Murdock finally decides to suit up as Daredevil. He finds Muse's lair, fights Muse, and rescues Angela, but Muse gets away. Meanwhile, Fisk gives Adam an axe and challenges him to a fight in which Fisk beats him and drags him back to his cell.
7	7	"Art for Art's Sake"	David Boyd	Jill Blankenship	April 1, 2025
A recuperating Angela tells the police that Daredevil saved her and directs them to Muse's lair. Kim reports to Fisk, who is angry that Daredevil has returned, that the primary suspect for Muse is a troubled young man named Bastian Cooper. Luca asks Vanessa to return to her criminal activities behind Fisk's back. In a session with Glenn, Bastian thanks her for helping him embrace his true identity. She realizes he is Muse and Bastian knocks her unconscious. Murdock and the AVTF separately find paintings of Glenn in Muse's lair and go to save her. As Daredevil, Murdock arrives at Glenn's office, rescues her, and fights Muse. As the AVTF prepares to enter, Glenn fatally shoots Muse before fainting. Murdock stabilizes her injuries before the AVTF arrives. Fisk gives credit for stopping Muse to the AVTF and publicly declares them to be heroes. Blake threatens BB into removing eyewitness mentions of Daredevil's involvement in the incident from her blog. A recovering Glenn tells Murdock that she heard Daredevil say her name. Vanessa seemingly sends Luca to kill Fisk, but this is a trap and Cashman kills Luca.
8	8	"Isle of Joy"	Justin Benson & Aaron Moorhead	Jesse Wigutow & Dario Scardapane	April 8, 2025
Dex is moved from solitary confinement to gen pop on Fisk's orders. Fisk also: reveals his imprisonment of Adam to Vanessa and watches as she kills him; promotes Blake to Deputy Mayor of Communications; and invites Glenn to his Black & White Ball fundraiser. Murdock realizes that Fisk is Glenn's patient, further straining their relationship as he contests her anti-vigilante views. At Josie's Bar, Murdock learns that Nelson was celebrating an impending court win the night he died. Believing Fisk hired Dex to silence Nelson, Murdock interrogates Dex and injures him. Dex later kills his doctor and a guard before escaping prison. At the ball, Fisk blackmails Duquesne—who is the sword-wielding vigilante Swordsman—and other socialites into supporting his Red Hook project. BB, who is aware of Fisk's involvement in her uncle Ben Urich's murder, asks Gallo to help bring down Fisk and the AVTF. Murdock deduces that it was actually Vanessa who hired Dex to kill Nelson, and confronts her. As Fisk starts to tell Glenn that Murdock is Daredevil, Dex arrives and shoots at Fisk. Murdock jumps in front of the bullet.
9	9	"Straight to Hell"	Aaron Moorhead & Justin Benson	Heather Bellson & Dario Scardapane	April 15, 2025
Dex escapes from the ball while Murdock is hospitalized. Fisk cuts off the power to New York City and orders Cashman to kill Murdock, who escapes to his apartment. Castle finds him there and they both fight AVTF officers, including North who is revealed to be Ayala's murderer. The pair reunite with Page, who asked Castle to protect Murdock after learning of Dex's escape. Murdock and Page track down Nelson's case files and discover that Red Hook is a free port and the Fisks are trying to turn it into their own city-state. Castle fights the AVTF at Red Hook, calling them out for using his symbol, and is captured. Fisk learns that Gallo is planning to undermine him and brutally crushes his skull. He turns the power back on and declares martial law, outlawing vigilantism and imprisoning Duquesne, Castle, and other dissidents at Red Hook. He offers Glenn the position of Mental Health Commissioner, which she accepts. Murdock recruits Cherry, Kim, and other honest police officers to resist Fisk and save the city. In a mid-credits scene, Castle tricks a prison guard to enable his escape.

== Cast and characters ==
=== Main ===
- Charlie Cox as Matt Murdock / Daredevil:
  A blind lawyer with superhuman senses from Hell's Kitchen, New York, who leads a double life as a masked vigilante. At the start of the season, Murdock focuses on being a lawyer due to the collateral damage that comes with being a vigilante and concerns about how effective that approach has been. Eli D. Goss guest stars as a young Murdock.
- Vincent D'Onofrio as Wilson Fisk / Kingpin:
  A powerful businessman and crime lord, who becomes the mayor of New York City. D'Onofrio said the tone for his character in the Disney+ series Echo (2024) would continue in Born Again, which he believed was how the character was best portrayed. The season sees Fisk amassing power and "flexing his darkness" to "basically gaslight a city, and then eventually a country, and then eventually a world".
- Margarita Levieva as Heather Glenn:
  A therapist and Murdock's love interest. She and Murdock have differing views on vigilantism which Cox said "leads to some poignant conversations" between the couple.
- Deborah Ann Woll as Karen Page:
  A former reporter and Murdock's friend and partner at the Nelson, Murdock & Page law firm. Because it had been years since she last played the character in Daredevil (2015–2018), Woll was concerned about her performance feeling like an impression of herself. However, she found her return to be natural given the rapport she has with Cox and Elden Henson. Page was not originally planned to be included in the series and was only added after it underwent a creative overhaul. Showrunner Dario Scardapane said the character was not in the season as much as he would have liked and would have a larger role in future seasons.
- Elden Henson as Franklin "Foggy" Nelson:
  Murdock's best friend and law partner, who is killed at the start of the series. Similar to Woll, Henson said returning to the role after seven years felt natural and not like he was doing an impression of himself. Cox described Nelson as "the heartbeat" of the Marvel Cinematic Universe (MCU) and said his death was "really hard".
- Wilson Bethel as Benjamin "Dex" Poindexter / Bullseye:
  A psychopathic assassin and former FBI agent who is a highly skilled marksman capable of using almost any object as a lethal projectile. After Dex masqueraded as Daredevil for Fisk in Daredevil, Fisk broke Dex's back and he underwent surgery using the metal alloy Cogmium, which enhanced his body.
- Zabryna Guevara as Sheila Rivera: Fisk's mayoral campaign director
- Nikki M. James as Kirsten McDuffie: A former New York assistant district attorney and Murdock's new law partner at the law firm Murdock & McDuffie
- Genneya Walton as BB Urich: A journalist for The BB Report and the niece of Ben Urich, who was killed by Fisk in Daredevil
- Arty Froushan as Buck Cashman: Fisk's right-hand man and fixer
- Clark Johnson as Cherry:
  A retired New York Police Department (NYPD) officer who works with Murdock as his investigator. Johnson modeled Cherry after Roy Scheider's character Buddy "Cloudy" Russo in the film The French Connection (1971).
- Michael Gandolfini as Daniel Blake: Fisk's protégé and member of his mayoral campaign
- Ayelet Zurer as Vanessa Fisk:
  Wilson's wife, who took over his criminal empire while he was away. Vanessa struggles with losing control of what she made successful, and longs for the "worse" version of Wilson rather than the version that is attempting to do good as mayor. Director Jeffrey Nachmanoff described their relationship as a "twisted" love story. Sandrine Holt was originally cast as Vanessa for Born Again. After the series' creative overhaul, Zurer—who portrayed the character in Daredevil—was brought back.
- Kamar de los Reyes as Hector Ayala / White Tiger:
  A vigilante whose enhanced powers come from the mystical Amulet of Power. Executive producer Sana Amanat said Ayala becomes a reflection of Murdock's own journey in the season. De los Reyes privately battled with cancer while filming the season and died before it was released. Director Michael Cuesta said the actor was determined to portray the character despite struggling with pain during filming.
- Jon Bernthal as Frank Castle / Punisher:
  A vigilante who aims to fight the criminal underworld by any means necessary, no matter how lethal the results are, following the brutal murder of his family. Castle is "the devil on [Murdock's] shoulder" pushing him to become Daredevil again. Bernthal said the season was a "toe dip", re-introducing Castle following Daredevil and its spin-off series The Punisher (2017–2019), to see if the creatives could "let Frank be what Frank is". He wanted the character to be dark, psychologically complex, and challenging for the audience, and felt the season "opened the door to getting closer to the Frank Castle that I really, really want to portray". Bernthal credited the series' approach to Scardapane, who was a writer on The Punisher; the stunt team; and Nick Koumalatsos, a former member of the Marine Raiders who helped Bernthal prepare. While training for the season at a gun range, Bernthal crossed paths with Thomas Jane who played the character in the Lionsgate film The Punisher (2004). The two discussed the character, which Bernthal appreciated.
- Mohan Kapur as Yusuf Khan: A Pakistani-American citizen from Jersey City who works as an assistant bank manager at New York Mutual and is the father of the superhero Kamala Khan / Ms. Marvel
- Tony Dalton as Jack Duquesne / Swordsman: A wealthy socialite who is secretly a sword-wielding vigilante

=== Recurring ===
- Patrick Murney as Luca: A criminal and leader of one of the Five Families
- Ruibo Qian as Angie Kim: An NYPD detective. Qian previously played Mei in the first season of Marvel's Netflix television series Jessica Jones (2015).
- Hamish Allan-Headley as Connor Powell: A corrupt NYPD officer and a member of Fisk's Anti-Vigilante Task Force (AVTF). His first name was confirmed offscreen.
- Hunter Doohan as Bastian Cooper / Muse: A masked serial killer who makes art with the blood of his victims. He is a patient of, and obsessed with, Glenn.
- Michael Gaston as Gallo: The NYPD Commissioner. Gaston previously played Gerald Sharpe in the seventh season of the Marvel Television series Agents of S.H.I.E.L.D. (2020).
- Ashley Marie Ortiz as Soledad Ayala: Hector's wife
- Camila Rodriguez as Angela del Toro: Hector Ayala's niece
- Jeremy Isaiah Earl as Cole North: An NYPD sergeant from Chicago and a member of the AVTF

=== Guest ===
- Cillian O'Sullivan as Devlin: A criminal behind a hijacking and later a bank robbery
- Gino Anthony Pesi as Viktor: A criminal and leader of one of the Five Families
- Susan Varon as Josie: The owner of Josie's Bar
- John Benjamin Hickey as Benjamin Hochberg: The New York City district attorney. Hickey previously played Peter Lyonne in the third season of Jessica Jones (2019).
- Andrew Polk as Fitzgerald "Jerry" Cooper: A New York City judge. Polk previously played Morty Bennett in the first season of The Punisher (2017).
- Nick Jordan as Nicky Torres: An informant who was accosted by corrupt NYPD officers
- Jefferson Cox as Kel Shanahan: A corrupt NYPD officer who is accidentally killed while fighting Ayala
- Elizabeth A. Davis as Sofija Ozola: A New York City prosecutor
- Charlie Hudson III as Leroy Bradford: A homeless man who commits a petty crime and is represented by Murdock
- Lou Taylor Pucci as Adam: An artist who had an affair with Vanessa and is taken captive by Fisk
- Jimmy Palumbo as Johnny Santini: A New York City Department of Sanitation worker
- Daniel Gerroll as Arthur Sledge: A socialite and Artemis's husband
- Katherine LaNasa as Artemis Sledge: A socialite and the wife of Arthur Sledge
- Andrew Call as Thomas Madison: A wealthy client of Murdock & McDuffie who is charged with fraud

Additionally, news anchor Pat Kiernan appears as himself after doing so in various other MCU projects.

== Production ==
=== Development ===
A reboot of Marvel's Netflix television series Daredevil (2015–2018) was reported to be in development with Marvel Studios in March 2022. The series was confirmed to be in development for Disney+ in late May, with Matt Corman and Chris Ord attached as head writers and executive producers. At San Diego Comic-Con that July, the series was announced as Daredevil: Born Again and was revealed to have 18 episodes for its first season. Directors were hired for blocks of episodes: Michael Cuesta joined in March 2023 to direct the first two episodes; Jeffrey Nachmanoff joined in May to direct the third and fourth episodes; David Boyd directed the fifth and sixth episodes; and Clark Johnson, a director on the Marvel Netflix series Luke Cage (2016–2018), also joined in May to direct another two episodes. Actor Tom Hiddleston, who portrays Loki in the MCU and is a close friend of star Charlie Cox, was also hired to direct an episode in the later half of the season.

By late September 2023, after six episodes had been filmed, Marvel Studios decided to overhaul the series with a new creative direction. Corman and Ord were let go as head writers, as were directors for the remaining episodes. Marvel planned to retain some elements that had been shot, add new serialized elements, and move closer to the tone of the Netflix series. The creative team also decided to connect the new series to the original series more directly than had been planned. Cox said it was confusing that Born Again was not a direct continuation of the Netflix series or a complete reboot. Brad Winderbaum, the head of streaming, television, and animation at Marvel Studios, said the studio believed they could "play it loose" with the history of Daredevil, wanting to keep Cox and Vincent D'Onofrio but otherwise "reset" to avoid alienating new viewers. The studio realized they had to either fully embrace the Netflix series or start over fresh. Dario Scardapane, a writer on Netflix's Daredevil spin-off series The Punisher (2017–2019), was hired as showrunner in October 2023. Filmmaking duo Justin Benson and Aaron Moorhead, who previously worked on the Marvel Studios series Moon Knight (2022) and the second season of Loki (2023), were hired to direct the remaining episodes.

A lot of the material that we shot pre-strike is brilliant and is still in the show and works really well. There were just some complicated factors around what we had been tasked to do and what we were discovering was and wasn't working... Credit to Marvel that they looked at the episodes and could acknowledge that we could still do better, and that we maybe needed to go in a slightly different direction... Where we ended up felt really good.

— Charlie Cox answering a question at Fan Expo Chicago in August 2024 about the differences in the series before and after the creative overhaul

A new pilot episode, two other new episodes, and new scenes for the existing episodes were written. Cox confirmed in May 2024 that nine episodes had been filmed. Marvel Studios president Kevin Feige said in August that these were the first season of Born Again and a second season was planned; with the creative overhaul, the planned 18-episode season had been split into two seasons, with the second ultimately having eight episodes. Also in August, Cuesta, Nachmanoff, and Boyd were re-confirmed to be credited directors. Moorhead said they wanted to "give those directors credit where it's due" despite him and Benson guiding the final edits for all of the episodes. Nachmanoff and Boyd returned to film new footage for the existing episodes and assisted Benson and Moorhead with blending the style of the original episodes with the lead directors' new material. Executive producers included Marvel Studios' Feige, Louis D'Esposito, Winderbaum, Sana Amanat, and Chris Gary, alongside Scardapane, Corman, Ord, Benson, and Moorhead. The series is released under Marvel Studios' "Marvel Television" label.

=== Writing ===
Original writers for the series included Corman, Ord, Grainne Godfree, Jill Blankenship, Aisha Porter-Christie, David Feige, Devon Kliger, Thomas Wong, Zachary Reiter, Molly Nussbaum, and Jesse Wigutow. David Feige, Wong, and Reiter are all former lawyers who previously worked on other lawyer-based television series. The initial take on the series was described as a legal procedural that was dark, but not as gory as the Netflix series, and more episodic than other Marvel Studios series with "self-contained" episodes. One planned bottle episode that Wigutow joined the series to work on was centered on Frank Castle / Punisher spending a "narratively... interesting night" with Maya Lopez / Echo. According to Cox, early discussions for the series were about "reinvent[ing] the whole thing" and portraying Matt Murdock / Daredevil as a different person from the one seen in the Netflix series. Murdock's friends Franklin "Foggy" Nelson and Karen Page were largely not acknowledged in this version of the series, with plans for Nelson to be killed off-screen before the events of the first season. Amanat said the creative team were struggling to incorporate the characters into the story, but Cox said there were discussions to do some "cool stuff" with them in the future. The season originally opened with a shot of Murdock, in the Daredevil suit, crying and dropping his mask; this was meant to occur shortly after Nelson's off-screen death to explain why Murdock decided to stop being Daredevil at the start of the series.

Following the creative overhaul, serialized elements were set to be added. Scardapane was joined by writers Heather Bellson and Wigutow, and three new episodes were written: the pilot and the final two episodes of the first season. The pilot acts as a bridge between the Netflix series and Born Again. Scardapane felt the end of the Netflix series—which sees Murdock, Nelson, and Page planning to go into business together again—was a good starting point for Born Again and did not need too much explanation for new viewers. He felt it was important to include Nelson and Page because they are Murdock's "family structure". Nelson also provides comic relief, while Page is "the heart and soul" of the series. Cox explained that a few years have passed since the end of Daredevil, with the characters running their law firm Nelson, Murdock & Page and having a "pretty good rhythm" together. The cast said the events of the Netflix series were part of their characters' histories, and there are some new storylines that build on the original's events, but they did not want to dwell too much on past events or alienate new viewers. Corman, Ord, Blankenship, David Feige, Godfree, and Wong received credits on the existing six episodes, which were kept largely intact. Winderbaum said test audiences responded well to those episodes and believed this was due to fan appreciation for the characters. Scardapane agreed that several elements in the original version worked well—including Murdock's relationships, balancing his time as a lawyer and vigilante, and the pressures of an antagonist like Kingpin—but he felt there were storylines that needed to be added along with context from the Netflix series. Cox had particularly pushed back against the bank heist episode, "With Interest", feeling the story did not make sense in the modern day and was not "sophisticated enough". However, it was left unchanged and Cox acknowledged that it received positive responses upon release. Scardapane described the season as a "cobbled-together Frankenstein". He hoped the new premiere and finale episodes would give a strong idea of what they wanted the series to be in future seasons.

Within the Marvel Cinematic Universe (MCU), the season is set after the Disney+ series Echo (2024). The first episode begins in late 2025, before jumping ahead a year to late 2026. The season continues into early 2027, and shows New Year's Eve and Saint Patrick's Day celebrations. At the beginning of the season, Murdock has not been Daredevil for a year after a "line was crossed", when Benjamin "Dex" Poindexter / Bullseye kills Nelson and Murdock tries to kill Dex in return. Scardapane thought it was essential that this moment be shown on screen, calling it "more than an inciting incident. This is an earthquake." Winderbaum said the creative team "agonized" over the decision to kill Nelson. They were inspired by the Daredevil comics, where Bullseye kills Karen Page. Amanat believed killing Nelson, who is Murdock's moral compass, was "the only thing that made sense" when telling a story about Murdock starting a new life without being Daredevil. Cox felt Nelson's death was an appropriate way to start the series, believing the new story needed to be "big, brave, and bold" and "shake things up" from the original. He suggested that Murdock be able to hear Nelson's heartbeat throughout the fight with Dex, which Scardapane thought was a brilliant idea and immediately added to the script. Nachmanoff supported the decision to spend the entire pilot dealing with Nelson's death, feeling that storyline "wasn't feasible [to convey] in one shot" as was the original plan. Winderbaum said Nelson's absence "looms large" for the rest of the season and "is a big part of the culmination"; the final two episodes reveal that Nelson's death was orchestrated by Vanessa Fisk due to him learning about the Fisks' plans for New York City's Red Hook port.

Both of these men carry a dark passenger. The dark passenger for Matt Murdock is Daredevil, and for Wilson Fisk, it's Kingpin. The tragic flaw in their characters is that they both give in to the darker side of their true nature, and they draw each other into that. We had to do parallel paths—both tried so hard to be something else: 'I'm Matt Murdock. I'm just a lawyer—I'm not Daredevil anymore.' 'I'm Wilson Fisk, mayor of New York City; I'm doing good things for people.' We wanted to bring that tension to a place where they literally can't sustain it, and things start to unravel and explode.

— Showrunner Dario Scardapane on the characters of Matt Murdock and Wilson Fisk and how they are explored in the first season

Wilson Fisk / Kingpin is elected mayor of New York City in the season, after learning of the need for a strong candidate in the post-credits scene of Echo. This follows a late 2010s storyline from the comics in which Fisk becomes mayor that builds to the "Devil's Reign" (2021–2022) event. Scardapane said the season always included Fisk's reign as mayor and the ending to that storyline would never have been a direct adaptation of the comics, considering the comics event involves a large number of heroes and villains and depicts the destruction of New York. Since an ending to this storyline had not been written when the series was overhauled, the writers had to make decisions about the end game of Fisk's reign as part of writing the new eighth and ninth episodes. Winderbaum said the relationship between Murdock and Fisk in Born Again would evolve from the Netflix series to be a "game of politics" rather than just trying to kill each other. Scardapane said the series was a "two-hander", exploring both characters. He said Fisk consolidates power in the season and Murdock is forced into a reactive position while struggling with his identity and whether to continue as Daredevil. The pair come to a "loose truce" which leads to them interacting less than they did in Daredevil, but Cox said they are on a "collision course" for the rest of the season, "pushing boundaries and forcing each other to cross lines they don't want to cross".

Though Fisk is the "prime villain", the season features other antagonists who Scardapane said would be "piling up" as the story continues. These include the serial killer Muse, whose storyline was inherited from the initial take on the series. Scardapane felt they did not do justice in resolving this storyline at the end of the first season, due to being limited by what had already been filmed and what they had time to film for the new episodes. However, he was able to expand on this storyline in future seasons. Murdock represents Hector Ayala / White Tiger after that character is wrongly accused of murdering a police officer. Ever since being originally cast in the role, Cox was interested in adapting the "Trial of the White Tiger" storyline from Daredevil vol. 2 #39–40 (2002–03), saying that storyline was "so fascinating to witness a character like Matt Murdock, a lawyer and also a superhero, defend another superhero". As part of the season's overhaul, Winderbaum suggested that Ayala's niece, Angela del Toro, become one of Muse's victims. Scardapane enjoyed this idea because it helped connect Ayala's storyline in the first act of the season to del Toro's role in the second act, and it also gave Murdock a greater purpose for putting the Daredevil suit back on to rescue her from Muse, which leads to him becoming the city's hero again by the season's final act. Scardapane chose to give police commissioner Gallo a violent death at Fisk's hands during the finale after reading a scene from the existing episodes where Gallo talks down to Fisk. Scardapane said no character could get away with humiliating Fisk without "intense" consequences.

=== Casting ===
Charlie Cox and Vincent D'Onofrio were reported in June 2022 to be starring in Born Again, reprising their respective roles of Matt Murdock / Daredevil and Wilson Fisk / Kingpin from Daredevil. Their casting was confirmed a month later at San Diego Comic-Con. Cox was notified by Marvel Studios in early 2022 that they were looking to feature the character in another project following his appearances in the film Spider-Man: No Way Home (2021) and the Disney+ series She-Hulk: Attorney at Law (2022). He learned that this was Born Again shortly before the Comic-Con announcement.

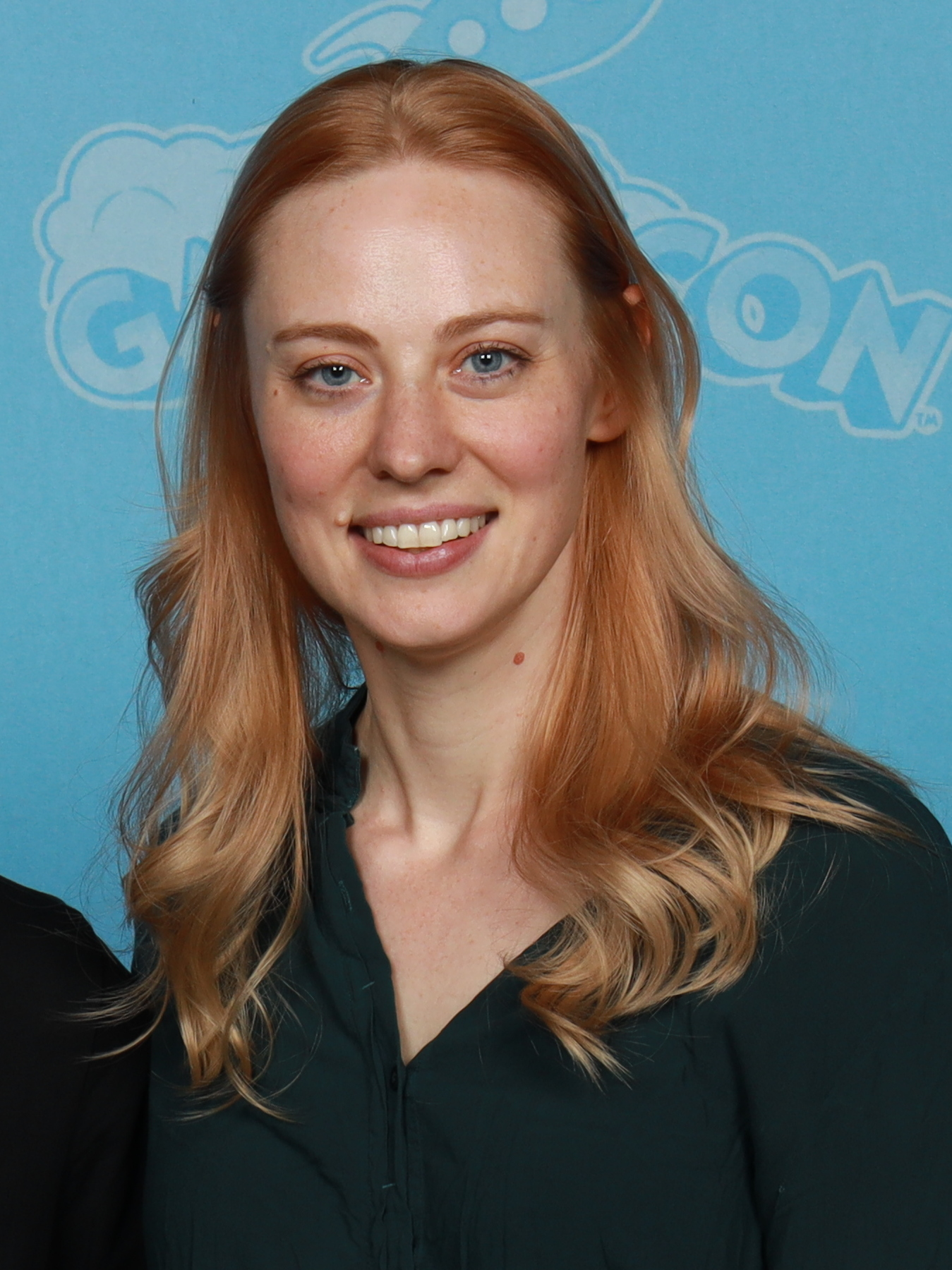
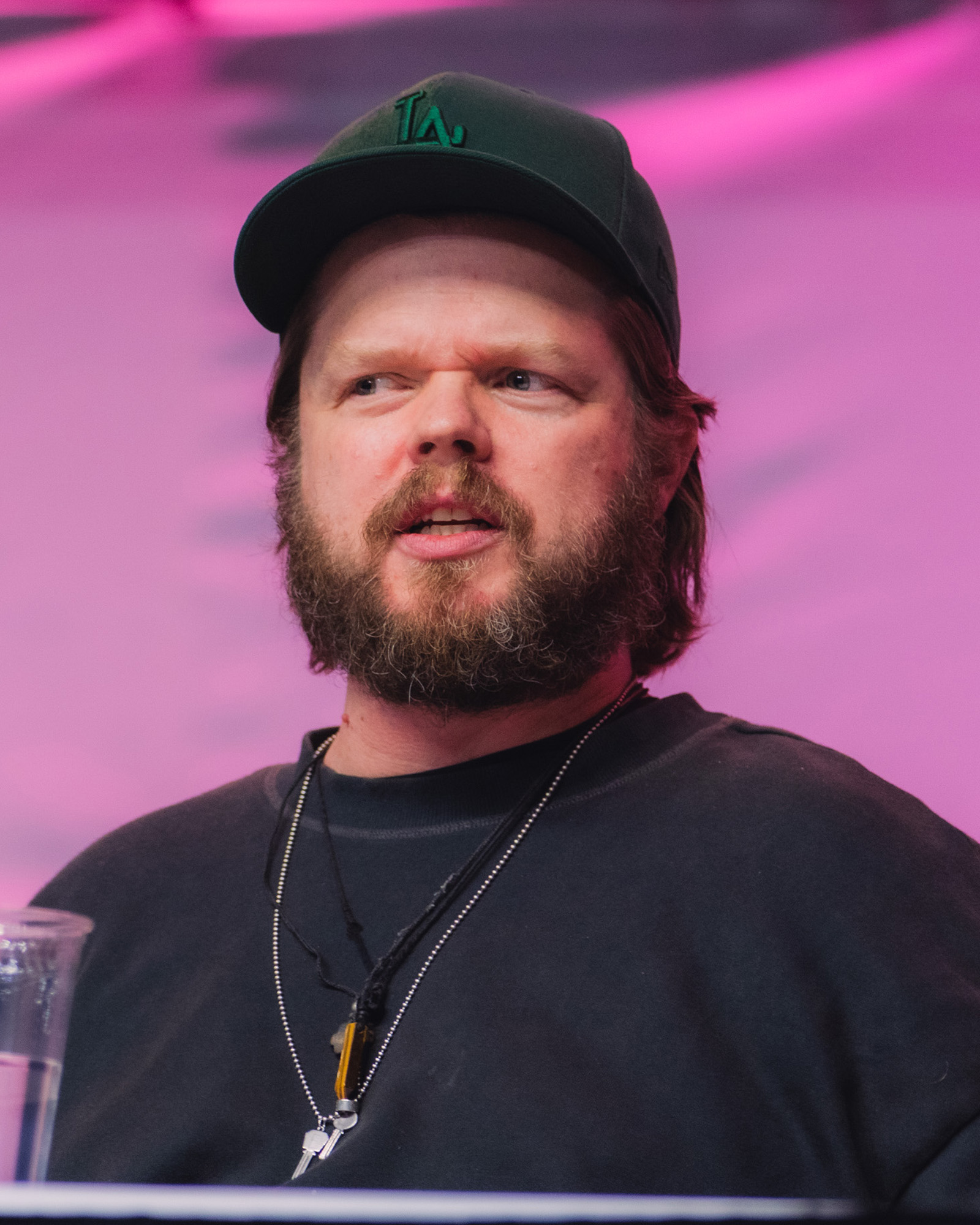
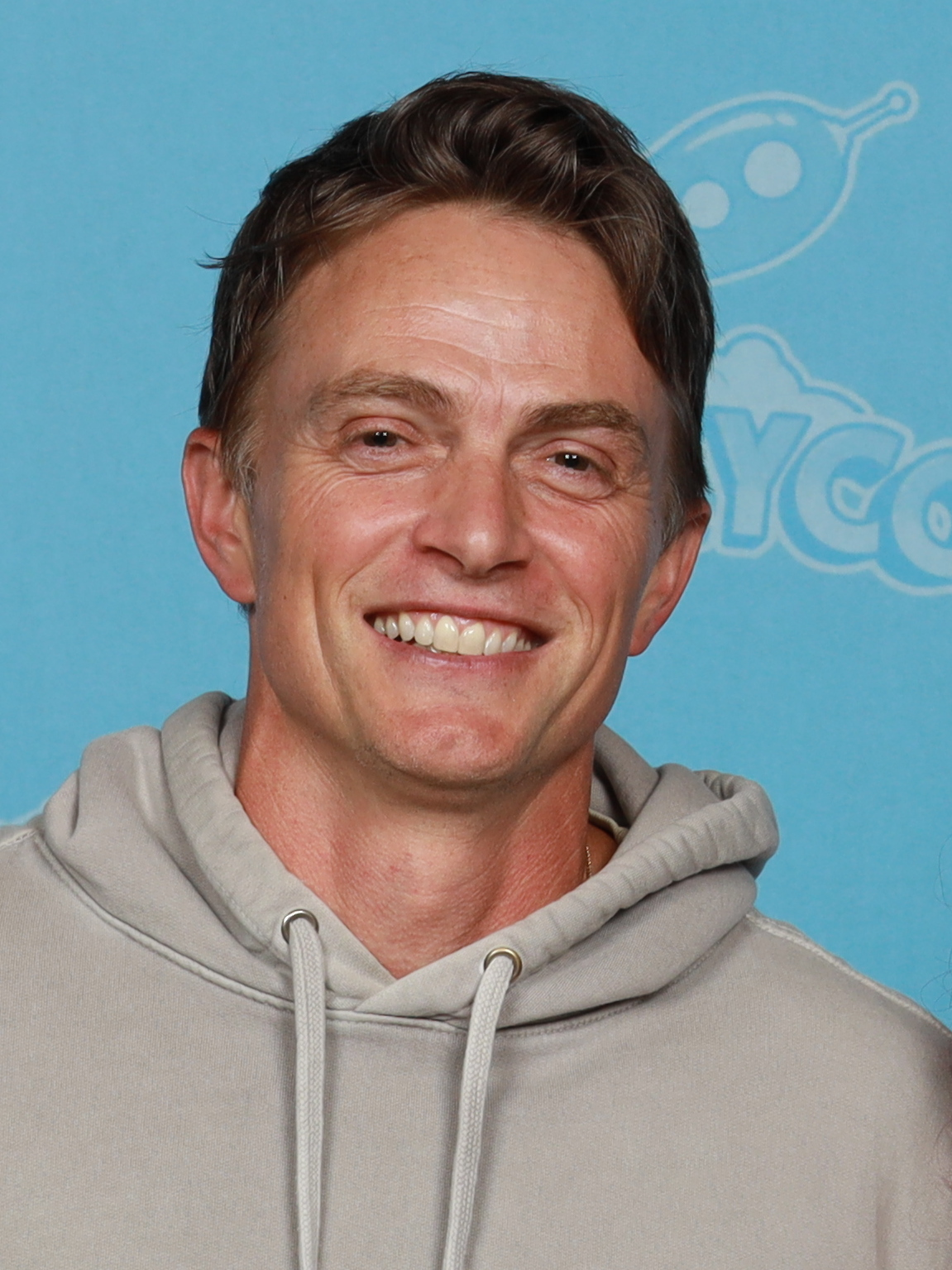
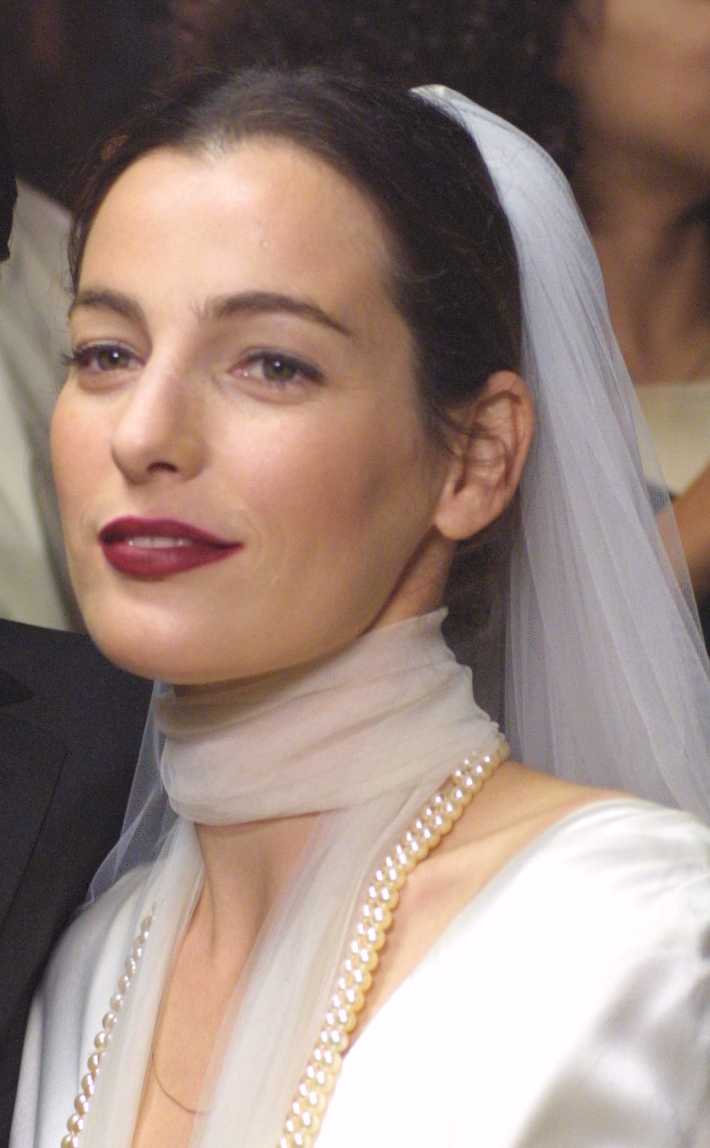
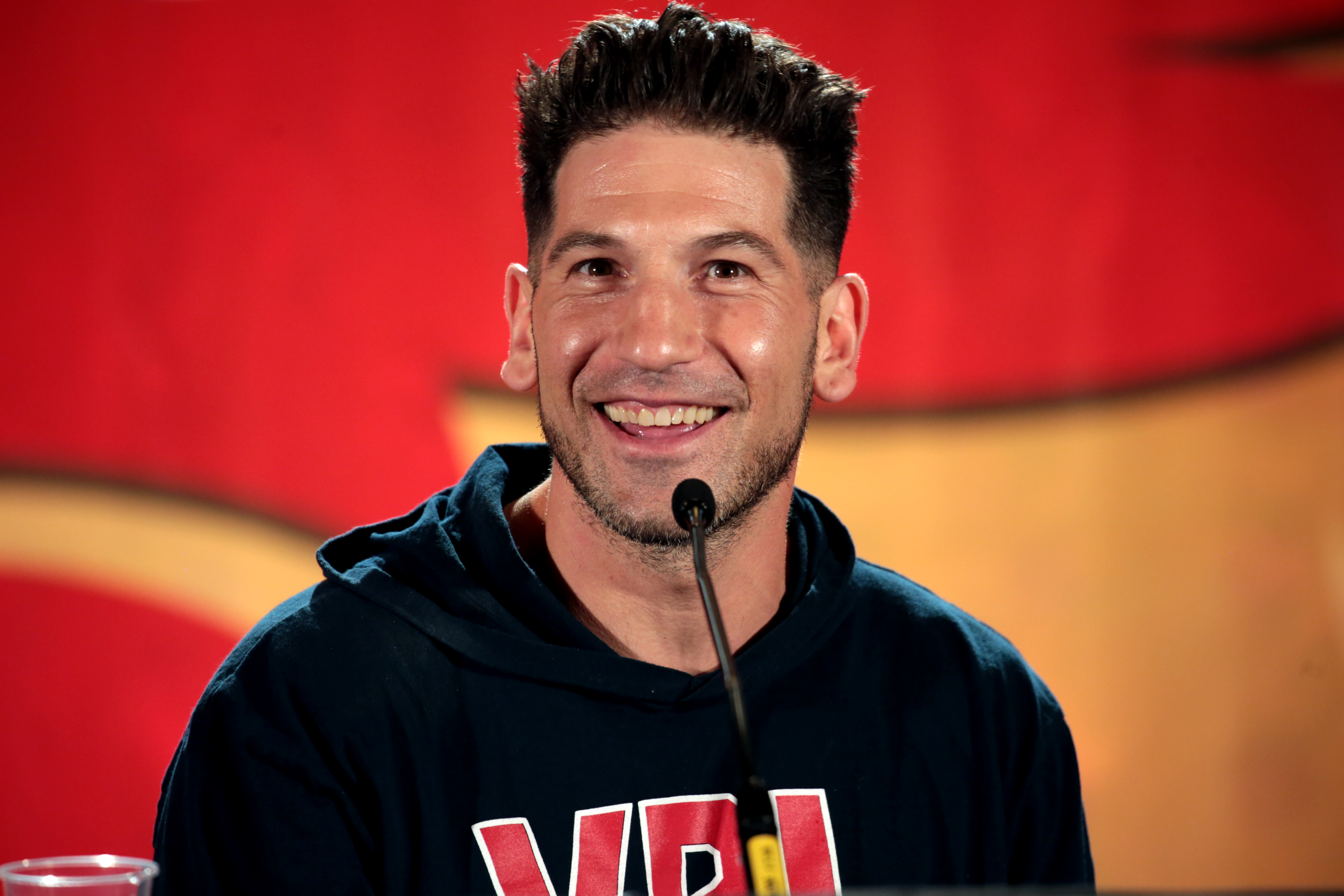
Daredevil cast members (left-to-right, top-to-bottom) Deborah Ann Woll, Elden Henson, Wilson Bethel, Ayelet Zurer and Jon Bernthal reprised their roles alongside Charlie Cox and Vincent D'Onofrio.

In December 2022, Michael Gandolfini, Margarita Levieva, and Sandrine Holt were cast in major roles. Gandolfini was reportedly portraying "an ambitious guy from Staten Island" named Liam, while Levieva and Holt were playing love interests for Cox and D'Onofrio, respectively. Holt was cast as Vanessa Fisk, replacing Ayelet Zurer from the original series. Nikki M. James joined the cast by January 2023. In March, Jon Bernthal was revealed to be reprising his role of Frank Castle / Punisher from Daredevil and The Punisher. Bernthal later said he "had to walk away" because he did not agree with where the series was taking Castle and thought it would not appeal to fans, but he eventually decided to return. The Hollywood Reporter said additional Daredevil cast members, such as Deborah Ann Woll (Karen Page) and Elden Henson (Foggy Nelson), were not expected to return and it was unclear if their characters would appear. Despite Henson not being asked to return, Cox said a cameo appearance for Nelson was planned to "end the link between the shows and give the old fans closure". Also in March, Michael Gaston and Arty Froushan joined the cast, with Froushan in a major role that was reported to be an associate of Fisk's named Harry. Set photos the following month indicated that Harris Yulin was part of the cast. In May, Clark Johnson was revealed to be cast in a recurring role, reportedly named Cherry, in addition to his hiring as a director. In September 2023, a United States Copyright Office filing for the series listed several roles: Levieva as Heather Glenn, Gandolfini as Daniel Blake, James as Kirsten McDuffie, Johnson as Cherry, Froushan as Buck Cashman, Genneya Walton as BB Urich, and Zabryna Guevara as Sheila Rivera. With the death of Kamar de los Reyes in December 2023, he was revealed to have a significant role.

Following the creative overhaul, Woll and Henson were set to reprise their roles as Page and Nelson. Woll was initially hesitant to join the series after feeling hurt that she was not involved in the initial version, but agreed to join after hearing Scardapane's plans for the character. Wilson Bethel also returned as his Daredevil character Benjamin "Dex" Poindexter / Bullseye, reportedly for three episodes. Amanat pushed for Bethel to return, finding the character intriguing and the most appropriate antagonist from the Netflix series to revisit. Guest star Susan Varon also reprised her role of Josie from the Netflix series. It was initially unclear if any of the new Born Again cast members would be retained, though Levieva, Gandolfini, and Froushan were soon reaffirmed to be part of the cast through set photos, as was Bernthal. He said Scardapane and the new creative team were more open to being collaborative about how best to portray Castle. Set photos also revealed that Jeremy Isaiah Earl had been cast as Cole North, and that Zurer would now be reprising her role as Vanessa; she was disappointed with the initial recasting and was pleasantly surprised when she was asked to return following the overhaul. A new character, Adam, was originally written to be a "big hulking bodyguard". Benson and Moorhead decided to cast Lou Taylor Pucci, who does not match that description, after working with him on their film Spring (2014). They said there was a metanarrative to the Born Again casting because they cast Pucci for Spring due to him playing D'Onofrio's son in the film Thumbsucker (2005) and him living with D'Onofrio during production on that film. In August 2024, de los Reyes was reaffirmed to be appearing in the series, portraying the character Hector Ayala / White Tiger. Camila Rodriguez portrays his niece, Angela del Toro.

Also in August 2024, Mohan Kapur was revealed to be reprising his role as Yusuf Khan from the MCU series Ms. Marvel (2022) and its follow-up film The Marvels (2023). Winderbaum said bringing a character from Ms. Marvel into the more serious world of Born Again was similar to crossovers between comic books with different tones. Cox teased the inclusion of additional MCU characters in Born Again for cameo appearances that he described as "fun, small moments of collision, but nothing major". Scardapane teased the appearance of a surprising character who naturally fit into the story due to it being set in the MCU's New York City. In February 2025, Tony Dalton was revealed to be reprising his role as Jack Duquesne / Swordsman from the Disney+ series Hawkeye (2021), reportedly for two episodes of Born Again.

=== Design ===
Emily Gunshor was the costume designer for the series and Michael Shaw was the production designer. Marvel Studios' head of visual development, Ryan Meinerding, once again designed the Daredevil suit for Born Again after doing so for the Netflix series. The suit in Born Again has a darker tone of red to reflect Murdock's evolution, along with black detailing and added texture which was described as less "shiny" than the suit in the Netflix series. At least five different Daredevil cowls are seen in the season, including an all-white version based on the one first seen in Daredevil vol. 8 #12 (June 2023), the yellow cowl used in She-Hulk, a black cowl, and two red cowls. Dex wears a black and blue tactical suit reminiscent of the costume that was introduced for the character in Daredevil vol. 6 #18 (February 2020). The suit features a holster attached to the chest, and black rings around the neck and shoulders as an homage to the character's "target" emblem in the comics. Comic book artist David Mack provided the art for Muse's murals.

=== Filming ===
Principal photography began on March 6, 2023, in the state of New York, under the working title Out the Kitchen. Filming took place in Yonkers outside the city mayor's office from March 7 through March 10. The production then moved to New York City, filming in Harlem on March 13 and 14, and in Williamsburg, Brooklyn, and at the Manhattan Municipal Building on March 15; Williamsburg was also used as a shooting location for Daredevil. Filming took place at the New York County Courthouse on March 17. Cox described New York City as "number one on the call sheet and the big star here". Shaw said it was important to film in the city because "on the real city streets and locations, you capture the energy of New York and that bleeds into the fabric of the series". The production wanted to explore parts of the city that had not been seen on film before. Filming occurred at 20 Exchange Place in the Financial District for the bottle episode bank heist, which was the same location used for the bank featured in the film Inside Man (2006).

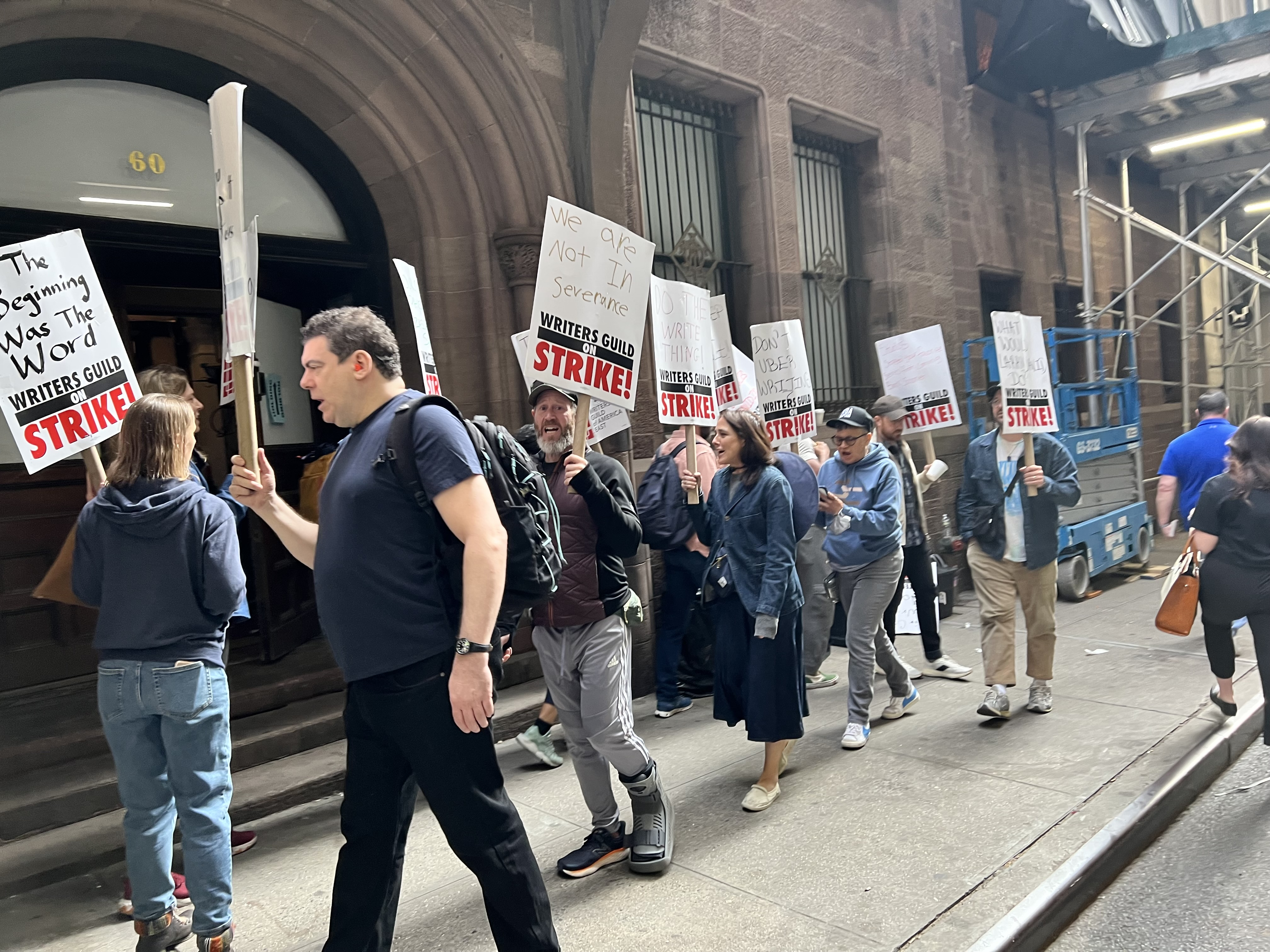
Picketers participating in the 2023 Writers Guild of America strike at the series' set on May 10, 2023. This and other picketing resulted in production being suspended on June 14 until after the strike's conclusion.

Soundstage work occurred at Silvercup Studios East in Queens. The series' art department built detailed recreations of rooms from Gracie Mansion, the official residence of the mayor of New York City; Shaw said there was something "slightly uncomfortable" about seeing Fisk in rooms that feel like "somebody's grandmother's house". Another set was Muse's lair which Shaw said was "a bit heightened" and very dark. Filming was set to take place at Silvercup on May 8, when picketers participating in the 2023 Writers Guild of America strike prevented filming from occurring. Production was planned to resume the following day. Because of the strike, Corman and Ord were unable to be on set. After further picketing on May 10 at the series' set in Brooklyn once again shut down filming, production was paused for the remainder of the week. Additional filming shutdowns because of picketing occurred in early June at Silvercup, before production was suspended on June 14 until after the strike's conclusion. Filming was originally expected to last for eight months. The last scene filmed before the shutdown was Castle's introduction. Cox was told that this scene was well received by executives and was one of the reasons that they decided to overhaul the series. He was grateful to Bernthal, who wrote much of the scene and moved it in a direction that was closer to the original series, for "potentially leading us back on track".

Six episodes were largely filmed before the shutdown, with Cuesta directing the first two episodes, Nachmanoff directing the third and fourth, and Boyd directing the fifth and sixth. Hillary Fyfe Spera and Pedro Gómez Millán were the cinematographers. The series was shot on Arri Alexa 35 cameras with Panavision G-series anamorphic lenses. Spera said they wanted to portray New York as "textured and grimy but also beautiful", taking inspiration from 1970s films such as The French Connection (1971), Klute (1971), Mean Streets (1973), and Taxi Driver (1976), as well as photographers Saul Leiter and Robert Frank. The third episode was conceived as a "day in the life" episode with no time jumps between scenes. Transitions were designed to show each scene happening straight after the previous one. Nachmanoff compared this to the film Birdman (2014), although unlike that film the episode was not intended to look like it was filmed in a single take. Following the creative overhaul, the directors for the remainder of the series were let go. Johnson had been hired to direct two of those episodes. Benson and Moorhead were set to direct the new episodes, with Nachmanoff and Boyd returning to assist them. Philip Silvera, a stunt coordinator on the Netflix series, was hired as stunt coordinator and second unit director for the new episodes, with Dave Macomber also taking on those roles for the series.

Filming resumed on January 22, 2024, with Spera serving as cinematographer on the new pilot episode. Spera was credited for all of the episodes except the fourth and fifth, with Millán the credited cinematographer for those. Benson and Moorhead felt the visual style of the material already shot "dovetailed with our instincts pretty well" and they did not have to deviate from their preferred style to match with the existing material. Nachmanoff felt Benson and Moorhead's visuals for the pilot matched the style of comic book frames seen in Frank Miller's work. Silvera conceived a single take fight scene for the new first episode, which had been a feature of Daredevil, and which Cox called "challenging for new and different reasons", largely because of added visual effect elements. The scene is not a "true" single take, employing cuts and other editing tricks similar to the single take sequence in the second season of Daredevil (2016). Winderbaum believed the series had Marvel Studios' "most brutal [visceral] action", saying it "packs a lot of power". Some scenes were shot twice with a less violent alternative, but Cox said they never used the less violent versions. Set photos at the end of January saw Cox, Henson, and Woll filming scenes, and revealed the involvement of White Tiger and Muse, the latter through on-set graffiti. Props from the Netflix series were brought back for a scene where the characters reminisce about their pasts. Benson and Moorhead suggested the inclusion of The BB Report man on the street segments, which were shot by independent documentary filmmakers Sean Dunne and Cass Marie Greener of Very Ape Productions and overseen by Nachmanoff. A script was written for the segments but most of them ended up being unscripted. Nachmanoff called this shooting "run and gun" like students do in film school, and felt it was "a really fun way to integrate the real streets of New York in the Marvel universe".

Benson and Moorhead chose to use a handheld camera for Murdock and characters close to him, and locked-down cameras with little movement for Fisk and characters close to him. Spera said wide lenses in close ups of Murdock made viewers feel "very with the character" while shots of Fisk from below the eye line were meant to "make him [and his institution] feel big and oppressive". Spera used more naturalistic lighting, such as from windows, for Murdock and had more white light or overhead sources for Fisk. Benson and Moorhead used stylistic lighting for characters based on their comics-associated color: blue light from overhead for Bullseye, white light from below for Fisk, and flashing red light for Daredevil. To depict Murdock's heightened senses, Benson and Moorhead wanted to primarily use analog, optical effects. They made a rig with three cameras that captured 180 degrees, which was combined with a dolly zoom, spherical lenses—rather than the standard anamorphic lenses—and a change in aspect ratio during post-production. Moorhead said they wanted the audience to "feel like [they] are Matt Murdock where you can hear every sound in the whole world". The use of a zoom and changing aspect ratio reveals what Murdock is honing in on, and is reminiscent of comic book frames.

In mid-February 2024, Nachmanoff re-filmed the death of White Tiger in Crown Heights, Brooklyn, and also filmed the scene where Murdock goes to find the bullet casing at the same location. Nachmanoff directed new scenes with Zurer and D'Onofrio for the original first two episodes as well as his original two episodes. He staged the Fisks' therapy sessions like a play, hoping to stay out of the way of the performances and create a "static, very strong unbalanced" composition with the larger Fisk on one side of the couch and the smaller Vanessa on the other side. Boyd returned to reshoot his episodes, re-filming what he believed was around half of the episodes to adjust them for the creative overhaul. To shoot Muse, Spera suggested using a handheld camera to have "liveness" in the shots, with wider lenses and a shallower focus used closer to the actor to "be present with them". Boyd said the handheld camera created an unsettling feeling for the viewer when Muse is seen. In early April, Bernthal and Cox filmed scenes in Brooklyn, ahead of a filming wrap party on April 5. Zurer and D'Onofrio filmed scenes in New York City shortly after. In mid-May, Cox and D'Onofrio said filming was completed three or four weeks earlier and nine episodes had been filmed.

=== Post-production ===
Editors for the season included Cedric Nairn-Smith, Melissa Lawson Cheung, and Stephanie Filo. Nairn-Smith previously worked on Moon Knight and the Marvel Studios series Ironheart (2025), while Cheung worked on the Marvel Studios series Secret Invasion (2023) as well as The Marvels. Following the creative overhaul, some of the episodes filmed before had "some rejiggering, and [new] framing, and bookends" added, and some scenes were moved to different episodes, but some of the original episodes were left "100% intact". For example, Castle's introduction in the new fourth episode was originally filmed by Boyd before the overhaul to appear in the original fifth or sixth episode. The new creative team decided to move it to the earlier episode. Bernthal was not available to reshoot the scene so Nachmanoff filmed some additional material with Cox that was used to rework the scene for its new position. Nachmanoff believed the fifth episode, the bottle episode bank heist, was the only one kept fully intact. He praised the editors for making the season feel "seamless" when combining material that was filmed before and after the creative overhaul. The completed fourth episode, which was originally intended to be the third, no longer has the "day in the life" style that it was initially conceived with but does retain some of the unique transitions between scenes. The second episode begins with a dedication to de los Reyes.

Gong Myung Lee is the series' visual effects supervisor, with visual effects provided by Rise FX, FOLKS, Phosphene, Powerhouse VFX, Ghost VFX, Soho VFX, Cantina Creative, Anibrain, Base FX, SDFX, and The Third Floor, Inc.

=== Music ===
In July 2024, the Newton Brothers were revealed to be composing music for the series. Their main theme incorporates the Daredevil theme by John Paesano and Braden Kimball, and was released as a digital single by Hollywood Records and Marvel Music on March 4, 2025. The composers seemingly acknowledged a similarity between a musical idea in the finale and the main theme of the MCU Spider-Man films in a social media post that they later deleted. Scardapane was surprised by the potential Spider-Man connection and was uncertain about any intentions Marvel Studios had regarding it. The season's score was released digitally by Hollywood Records and Marvel Music in two volumes: music from the first four episodes was released on March 28, and music for the other five episodes was released on April 18.

Daredevil: Born Again (Episodes 1–4) [Original Soundtrack]
No.	Title	Length
1.	"Marvel's Daredevil: Born Again Main Theme"	1:50
2.	"Brick & Blood"	2:05
3.	"Bullseye"	1:30
4.	"No Holds Barred"	1:47
5.	"Remorse"	1:54
6.	"Fisk"	1:28
7.	"Where There's Smoke"	1:07
8.	"No Room for Redemption"	3:20
9.	"I Love NY"	4:38
10.	"The Hollow Crown"	1:49
11.	"Shadows We Fear"	0:36
12.	"City Cadence"	2:08
13.	"How I Feel"	1:13
14.	"Singing Frog"	0:52
15.	"Bloody Knuckles"	1:21
16.	"Passing Information"	1:51
17.	"Closing Statement"	2:45
18.	"Sentencing"	1:33
19.	"Trying to Live"	1:21
20.	"A Broken Castle"	2:34
Total length:		33:42

Daredevil: Born Again (Episodes 5–9) [Original Soundtrack]
No.	Title	Length
1.	"Hands in the Air"	1:30
2.	"The Devil You Know"	2:04
3.	"Muse"	1:49
4.	"Reflection"	1:30
5.	"Act Like Animals"	4:30
6.	"Pick Your Fight"	2:26
7.	"Team Suspicion"	2:47
8.	"Fear No Evil"	3:05
9.	"Chaotic Mess"	2:50
10.	"No Pictures"	1:18
11.	"When and Where"	1:13
12.	"Survive"	2:11
13.	"Love & Power"	3:57
14.	"Femoral Head Midnight"	2:17
15.	"The Lord Near My Shadows"	1:17
16.	"Mrs. K"	2:27
17.	"Suffering & Justice"	4:04
18.	"Six Judgements, Six Miracles, Six Snares"	1:46
19.	"Faith x Fury: The Daredevil Suite"	4:33
Total length:		44:14

== Marketing ==
Cox and D'Onofrio promoted the series at Disney's May 2024 upfront presentation, where the release month was announced and the first trailer was shown. The pair again promoted the series and showed a trailer at Disney's D23 convention that August, alongside Feige, Bernthal, Woll, and Henson. Writers at Deadline Hollywood and TheWrap all felt the D23 trailer was more cinematic than the Netflix series and more mature than most Disney+ series. They also compared a confrontation between Murdock and Fisk in the trailer to the crime film Heat (1995). Following online leaks of the D23 footage, Marvel released an official look at Daredevil in his red costume within their video celebrating the company's 85th anniversary. In October 2024, Marvel Comics announced a new publishing line titled Marvel Premier Collection, which consists of new paperback editions of popular comic book runs that are considered to be good starting points for new readers. A reprint of the "Born Again" comic was released in February 2025, with a new introduction from Miller and a foreword by Cox.

A teaser trailer was released on January 15, 2025. It was originally scheduled to be released two days earlier, but was postponed because of the 2025 Southern California wildfires. Commentary on the trailer focused on the return of characters from the Netflix series and on its brutal, violent action. Andy Behbakht at Screen Rant said the dark and violent action sequences quelled some concerns that the series would not retain those elements from the Netflix series in its move to Disney+. He also highlighted the reveal that Murdock is no longer a vigilante at the start of the new series.

== Release ==
The first season of Daredevil: Born Again premiered on Disney+ on March 4, 2025, with its first two episodes. The other seven episodes were released through April 15. The series was originally scheduled to debut in early 2024, but was removed from Marvel Studios' release schedule in September 2023 after filming was suspended by the 2023 Hollywood labor disputes. The next month, a copyright filing for the first episode indicated an approximate release in January 2025. The March 2025 debut was announced in May 2024. A red carpet premiere event was held on February 24 at the Hudson Theater in New York City, where the first two episodes were screened. The season is part of Phase Five of the MCU, and was released under Marvel Studios' "Marvel Television" label.

== Reception ==
=== Viewership ===
Screen Engine/ASI, which tracks the top ten most-mentioned entertainment options through a survey of over 1,000 consumers, reported that Daredevil: Born Again was the fourth most-mentioned title from March 1–7 with 1.9% of all mentions. Market research company Parrot Analytics, which looks at consumer engagement in consumer research, streaming, downloads, and on social media, reported it experienced high demand in Canada following its premiere on Disney+ in early March. The series was 44.4 times more in demand than the average TV series in Canada during the week of March 3–9. This performance placed it at No. 2 on the digital originals chart, behind Prime Video's Invincible. The demand for Daredevil: Born Again was also higher than that of the original Marvel's Daredevil series, which ranked No. 5 with a demand average of 35.3. Screen Engine/ASI later announced that the series was the sixth most-mentioned title from March 8–14 with 1.7% of all mentions. Daredevil: Born Again was among the most in-demand series debuts and superhero series of 2025, according to Parrot Analytics.

Whip Media, which tracks viewership data for the more than 25 million worldwide users of its TV Time app, said that Daredevil: Born Again secured a spot in the top three most-streamed original series in the U.S. for the week ending March 9–23. The series subsequently reached the first place from the week ending April 13–20. The streaming aggregator Reelgood, which tracks real-time data from 20 million U.S. users for original and acquired content across SVOD and AVOD services, announced that it was one of the ten most-streamed shows in the U.S. from March 5 to April 23. JustWatch, a guide to streaming content with access to data from more than 45 million users around the world, stated that it was among the top ten most-streamed series in the U.S. from March 3 to April 20. Born Again was also one of the ten most-streamed shows in Canada from March 3–9, according to JustWatch.

The two-episode premiere received 7.5 million views on Disney+ in its first five days according to Disney; the company defines a view as total stream time divided by runtime. This was the biggest debut on Disney+ for 2025 at that point, and was compared to the two-episode debut of fellow MCU Disney+ series Agatha All Along (2024) which had 9.3 million views within its first seven days of streaming. Luminate, which measures streaming performance in the United States using viewership data, audience engagement metrics, and content reach across multiple platforms, announced that Born Again recorded 136 million minutes of watch time on its first day. Nielsen Media Research, which records streaming viewership on U.S. television screens, estimated that Born Again drew 5.8 million U.S. viewers in its first 35 days, making it one of the most popular shows of the 2024–2025 season. Nielsen's multiplatform figures account for 35 days of viewing across linear television and streaming; however, since Born Again premiered on March 4, it had significantly less time to accumulate viewership before the report's early April cutoff date. Luminate subsequently reported that the first season of Born Again amassed 2.8 million views and was streamed for 1.3 billion minutes during the first half of 2026.

According to Cox, "With Interest" was one of the highest-rated episodes ever on Disney+ based on Disney's internal ratings.

=== Critical response ===
Daredevil: Born Again season 1: Critical reception by episode
Percentage of positive critics' reviews tracked by the website Rotten Tomatoes

On review aggregator Rotten Tomatoes, 87% of 224 critics gave the season a positive review, and the average of rated reviews was 7.70 out of 10. The critics consensus reads, "Resurrecting Charlie Cox's Daredevil with his virtues intact—namely Vincent D'Onofrio as his terrifying adversary—Born Again is an ambitious and at times ungainly crime saga that marks a mature tonal shift for the MCU." Metacritic, which uses a weighted average, assigned a score of 69 out of 100 based on 33 critics, indicating "generally favorable" reviews. Critics said the season exceeded expectations and highlighted the character-driven storytelling and performances, particularly those of Cox and D'Onofrio. There were mixed feelings on how it compares to the original Daredevil series, and many critics acknowledged that the seams of the creative overhaul are visible.

Aramide Tinubu at Variety called the season "a brilliantly detailed continuation" of Daredevil and "wonderfully complex" that "takes a sledgehammer to its former Netflix world, allowing the titular character and those orbiting him to transform under the weight and pain of time". Tinubu enjoyed the season's exploration of how fast corruption spreads within political institutions and concluded that the season was "a breathtaking example of what it means to revisit a known hero while offering him new reasons to fight for justice". Amon Warmann writing for Empire felt Born Again "retains much of what was great about that Netflix run[...] and adds in just enough fresh elements to keep things interesting". He praised Cox and D'Onofrio, calling them "two of the best casting decisions in Marvel history", and enjoyed Murdock's courtroom scenes as well as Fisk's marital issues storyline, noting it was an unexpected one for a series like Born Again. The season's focus on the people of New York was also a highlight, as was the action sequences and the audio and visual techniques used to portray Murdock's heightened senses, which were "incredibly effective". Warmann gave the season 4 out of 5 stars.

The Hollywood Reporter's Angie Han said, "The adherence to formula that makes Born Again so satisfying at its best is also what ultimately keeps it feeling trapped in amber." She praised the performances of Cox and D'Onofrio and enjoyed some of the new cast who had "strong impressions right off the bat" but ultimately grew "less fleshed-out" as the season progressed, and also enjoyed the inclusion of MCU characters, whose appearances served as a "reminder of how expansive this cinematic universe can be, not how oppressively interconnected it's become". Han believed the action sequences lacked "novelty", but offered a sense of nostalgia, and some storylines such as The BB Report segments and the corruption "[came] off more like self-conscious affectations meant to give Born Again a grown-and-gritty sheen rather than serious attempts to engage with larger themes", ultimately leading to few surprises and missed opportunities in the season. Reviewing the season for RogerEbert.com, Cristina Escobar enjoyed the season as a courtroom drama and its "layering of moral complexity" elevated the season. She also liked the use of the various villains besides Fisk, as it created a "less predictable" season, making it "hard to guess where an individual plotline [were] going". Escobar had issues with the pacing of the season, noting it took "a lot of time getting to its central premise", and was disappointed in the writing for Glenn as Murdock's love interest, which made her come across "an easily manipulated nag rather than an intelligent actor in her own right". She concluded that the "real allure" of the season was its "call to arms against tyranny" working as "an imperfect interrogation of our current moment".

In his 2.5 out of 5 star review for Total Film, Bradley Russell felt the season was "a huge disappointment" given it lacked Daredevil's "warm supporting cast and bone-crunching action". He enjoyed the performances from Cox, D'Onofrio, Bernthal, and the set up for the second season. However, speaking to the season's creative overhaul, Russell believed the additions from Scardapane were not enough to move the season away from its original plan to start fresh from the Netflix series, calling the season "a noticeably Frankensteined project [... with] an awkward patchwork of occasionally good repairs stapled over the top of a pretty bad series", pointing to the lack of Nelson and Page in the season as was originally intended. Russell was also disappointed with the use of Muse as a villain and the "constant interrupting" of The BB Report segments using exposition to tell viewers how they should feel. In a more critical review, Alan Sepinwall from Rolling Stone called the season "a Frankenstein monster [...] with various parts stitched together in ungainly fashion". He felt like the season was "lurching back and forth between its competing creative visions, with Scardapane having to work around the story ideas and new characters he inherited from his predecessors". Sepinwall did not enjoy the legal drama storylines, as various parts of the case were "raced through" and believed new characters McDuffie, Glenn, and Cherry were "awfully thin", though Blake was "one of the more effective cast additions". Praise was given to the performances of Cox, D'Onofrio, and Bernthal, as well as Fisk running for mayor and the season's midpoint when Murdock helps stop a bank robbery. That episode was "nimble and fun" and a "self-contained hour that so many of these Marvel shows — both in the Netflix era and the Disney+ one — have desperately needed to do, but have rarely attempted".

Bob Strauss of TheWrap noted the political nature of the season, pointing to the "endless parallels" to the first 100 days of the second Donald Trump presidency, which was "as disturbing as any point-blank execution or real-time skull crushing"; called Fisk "one big Donald Trump analog"; believed The BB Report segments were "echo[ing] familiar MAGA, as well as more thoughtful but not necessarily accurate, attitudes"; noted the parallels of Vanessa Fisk rarely appearing with Wilson in public to Melania Trump; and felt Blake had "the naïveté, enthusiasm and careerism we might associate with young Republicans". Sepinwall was also aware of the "echoes" to the political climate the season released in.

Discussing the continuous shot fight from the opening of the first episode, Casey Loving at TheWrap felt the action was "stakeless and inert" and the sequence was "a perfect encapsulation of many of the problems" with the season, saying, "It does a fine job of imitating what fans remember loving from the original Netflix series, yet it fails to capture any of the grit and texture that made those seasons special." He ranked the fight in April 2026 seventh out of the character's seven continuous shot fights to date.

=== Accolades ===
D'Onofrio and Woll were named as honorable mentions for TVLine's "Performer of the Week", respectively for the season premiere and the season finale. Matt Webb Mitovich highlighted D'Onofrio's performance in the premiere's meeting between Fisk and Murdock, saying he "slipp[ed] back into the Fisk voice and composure he crafted 10 years ago", as well as Woll's different performances opposite Cox and Bernthal in the finale.

Accolades received by Daredevil: Born Again season 1
Award	Date of ceremony	Category	Recipient	Result	Ref.
Astra TV Awards	June 10, 2025	Best Drama Series	Daredevil: Born Again	Nominated	
Astra TV Awards	June 10, 2025	Best Actor in a Drama Series	Charlie Cox	Nominated	
Astra TV Awards	June 10, 2025	Best Supporting Actor in a Drama Series	Vincent D'Onofrio	Nominated	
Black Reel TV Awards	August 18, 2025	Outstanding Editing	Stephanie Filo (for "Isle of Joy")	Won	
Critics' Choice Super Awards	August 7, 2025	Best Actor in a Superhero Series, Limited Series or Made-for-TV Movie	Charlie Cox	Nominated	
Critics' Choice Super Awards	August 7, 2025	Best Villain in a Series, Limited Series or Made-for-TV Movie	Vincent D'Onofrio	Nominated	
Saturn Awards	March 8, 2026	Best Superhero Television Series	Daredevil: Born Again	Nominated	
