= Daniel Arshack =

American lawyer

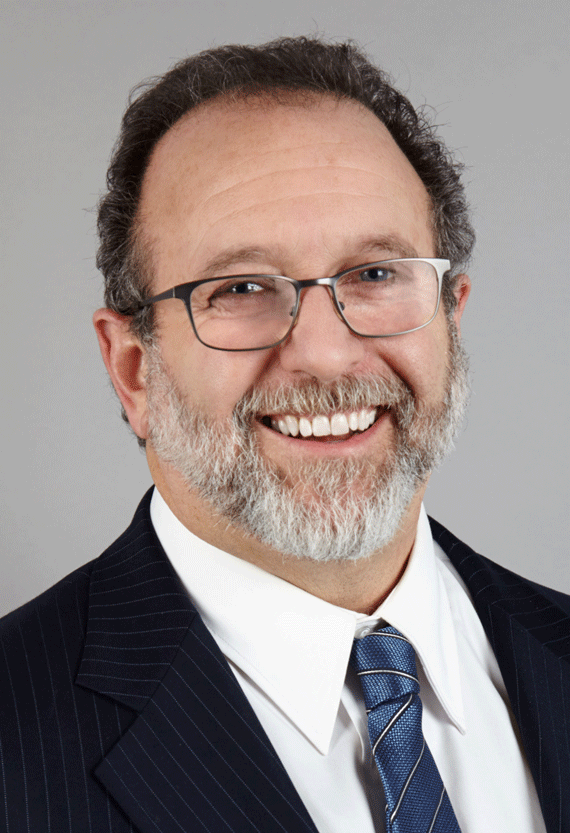
- Daniel Arshack in 2014
- Born: March 30, 1956 (age 70); Detroit, Michigan
- Education: Brandeis University; Antioch School of Law
- Occupation: Attorney

Daniel "Dan" Arshack (born March 30, 1956) is an American criminal defense attorney, co-founder of The Bronx Defenders, managing partner of the law firm Arshack, Hajek and Lehrman, PLLC, and a founding member of the International Criminal Bar, which was created to promote "the development of an independent legal profession and practice before the International Criminal Court." Arshack, who has been a defender for his entire career and "has never put anyone behind bars as either a prosecutor or government counsel," is known for his expertise on international criminal justice issues, lawyer trainings, and anti-death penalty advocacy. Arshack has conducted training for lawyers in Paris, Beirut, The Hague, Victoria, Montreal, Liberia, and New York. His specialties are trial advocacy techniques, ethics, and international criminal tribunals. He has also been an adjunct professor of trial advocacy at the Benjamin N. Cardozo School of Law in New York.

== Early life and education ==
Arshack was born in Detroit on March 30, 1956, and lived there until 1959. His parents divorced and his mother raised him and his sister Susan in Ann Arbor until she moved the family to the Washington, D.C. area in 1966. Arshack attended Montgomery Blair High School in Silver Spring, Maryland, where he played on the varsity soccer team and was president of Stage Crew. He supervised designing and building the sets for Oliver and Lil‘ Abner.

Arshack studied at Brandeis University, where he first majored in technical theater and studied theatre set design in Sweden at the Stockholm University, though ultimately majored in Sociology.

His first job out of college was as a field researcher for the Environmental Protection Agency on a national rural water quality assessment study. He was assigned a portion of northeastern Pennsylvania and was responsible for interviewing rural households about their water and took samples of water for testing. He then worked from 1978 to 1980 as research analyst for Abt Associates, a social science think tank in Cambridge, MA. He worked on studies designed to understand methods of improving the workflow though welfare offices, compared the outcomes of child day care programs in relation to their funding models and addressed juvenile justice issues. Arshack then attended Antioch School of Law in Washington D.C., from which he graduated in 1983. In 1994, he completed post-graduate work in Medical Bio-Ethics and the Humanities at the Columbia College of Physicians and Surgeons and Einstein School of Medicine.

== Early Law career ==
After receiving his J.D. degree from Antioch, Arshack worked at private firms in Washington D.C. and Philadelphia from 1983 to 1987. His scope of practice included administrative hearings in securities fraud litigation, criminal trials including conspiracy, drug sales, interstate prostitution, homicide, passport fraud, and bank teller fraud; he also handled complex product liability work business loss, contracts, civil rights, and federal tort claims. As a result of one of his first cases, involving the rape of a young boy while in pre-trial detention in Washington, D.C., which successfully challenged the conditions of confinement for juveniles in Washington, D.C., Arshack had the opportunity to assist in the drafting of the Child Protection Act of 1984, which protected vulnerable children from being housed in cells with older, more violent arrestees.

From 1987 to 1991, Arshack worked as a trial attorney at the Legal Aid Society in New York City, where he represented thousands of clients and participated in training new lawyers. During this time, he successfully challenged the length of time individuals could be confined pending indictment.

While still a young Legal Aid lawyer, Arshack was featured in the 1990 Ted Koppel documentary news report that followed a drug trial from beginning to end. At the conclusion of the case after his client was convicted, Arshack answered in response to Koppel asking if he thought his client got a fair trial: "Well, I believe there should have been a level playing field. In this case there were two prosecutors in the room. One sat at the table next to me and the other was wearing a black robe" (referring to then New York State Supreme Court Justice Leslie Crocker Snyder).

From 1991 to 1996, Arshack again worked in a private practice, which emphasized criminal defense in state and federal courts.

== Bronx Defenders ==
In 1996, Arshack, under contract to the City of New York, built a new public defender’s office in The Bronx known as The Bronx Defenders, now a nationally recognized office. His team of lawyers and support staff handled around 13,000 cases per year. While with the Bronx Defenders, Arshack implemented a program to train attorneys from Latin America to set up public defender programs in their countries.

== Managing Partner ==
In 1999, Arshack, along with David Hoffman, formed Arshack & Hoffman, P.C., in Manhattan. The firm specialized in criminal defense and the defense of medical malpractice cases. When Hoffman left the firm to become General Counsel at Wyckoff Heights Medical Center in 2003, Arshack formed Arshack, Hajek, and Lehrman, PLLC, which provides criminal defense to businesses and individuals, medical malpractice defense to physicians and hospitals, and counsel to businesses in complex commercial litigation; the firm works throughout the United States and internationally. Arshack’s partners are Lynn Hajek, who specializes in representing hospitals and physicians in medical malpractice cases, and Michael Lehrman, who heads the trial defense division of the firm’s medical malpractice group.

== Major cases ==
=== Nieves v. Home Box Office, Inc. ===
In 2006, Arshack successfully represented actress and singer Chanti Nieves’s privacy interests, when she was surreptitiously videotaped by HBO’s reality show Family Bonds as she stood on a street corner in Manhattan. Members of the cast made "crude remarks" about the effect Nieves’s appearance had on their genitals, and she sought damages. Manhattan Supreme Court Justice Debra A. James ruled in Ms. Nieves's favor that Family Bonds would have had to show a "real relationship" between the show’s subject matter and the bystander’s image to avoid liability in an invasion of privacy case.

=== Upholding secrecy in Rosenberg Testimony ===
In 2008 and 2015, Arshack represented David Greenglass, the brother of Ethel Rosenberg, who was a key government witness in the case against Julius and Ethel Rosenberg. A group of historians sought to uncover Greenglass’s secret grand jury testimony, which led to the conviction and subsequent execution of the Rosenbergs; letters Arshack wrote on his client’s behalf convinced a federal judge in the July 2008 decision not to unseal Greenglass’s testimony. Arshack, representing the estate of David Greenglass and his family, continued to resist the release of that grand jury testimony in 2015 after Mr. Greenglass’s death.

=== New York vs. Alain Robert ===
In 2008, Arshack represented "French Spiderman" Alain Robert, who was charged with reckless endangerment, among other charges. Robert claimed to have climbed The New York Times Building to raise awareness about global warming. After hearing Robert’s testimony, a grand jury decided to reduce his felony charges to minor non-criminal violations; Robert was sentenced to three days of community service, which he completed at the nonprofit organization Gay Men’s Health Crisis.

=== Defense of former Qaddafi official ===
In 2011, Arshack provided the United States defense of the highest-ranking former official of Libya’s Qaddafi regime to defect from Libya at the inception of the Arab Spring. The defense, during a prolonged multi-pronged investigation of the official, required interaction with the FBI, UK Investigators, Scottish Police and SEC investigators, who sought information concerning events in which Libya was suspected of being involved ranging from the mid-1980s to 2010. Prolonged negotiations in Doha, Qatar, with various law enforcement agencies from different countries resulted in no charges being filed.

=== The People of the State of Colorado vs. James Holmes ===
In 2013, Arshack was asked to join the legal team of the Aurora, CO "Dark Knight" movie theater shooter James Eagan Holmes, in an attempt to compel the Fox News reporter Jana Winter to appear before a judge in Colorado. Winter refused to reveal confidential sources, members of Colorado law enforcement, who had violated a Colorado judge’s gag order by sharing the contents of Holmes’s notebooks with her. Holmes faced the death penalty, but was convicted and sentenced to 12 life terms for 12 murders, plus 3,318 years for attempted murder. Arshack won at both the trial and appellate levels, but the highest court in New York ruled against Holmes. Arshack appealed to the United States Supreme Court, who declined to hear the case.

=== Created novel process for clearing individual maligned in a United Nations report ===
In 2014, Arshack represented the single largest taxpayer in the Democratic Republic of the Congo (DRC), who had been identified in a very public United Nations report prepared by UN area "experts" as a funder and supporter of rebel groups in that country. The individual denied the allegations and sought legal counsel to generate the evidence that the allegations were false and then convince the UN to retract the allegations made in the report, as these allegations had taken a severe toll on his business interests throughout the DRC and elsewhere in Africa and Europe. As a result of Arshack’s representation, the UN took the completely unprecedented step of agreeing to retract all of the damaging statements made against this individual; moreover, Arshack’s team addressed the lack of process within the UN structure to address allegations such as those made in these UN reports.

=== United States vs. Devyani Khobragade ===
In 2013, Arshack represented Indian diplomat Devyani Khobragade, then the Deputy Consul General in New York, who was arrested on charges of illegally obtaining a work visa for her children’s nanny and paying her far less than the minimum wage. The case received considerable press and comment from the US State Department. Arshack advised Khobragade against leaving the country without a judge’s permission amidst the media storm. Ultimately all charges against Khobragade were dismissed.

=== Kenyan nationals facing extradition and drug trafficking charges ===
In 2014, Arshack was hired to consult in Mombasa, Kenya as Learned Counsel in the fight against the United States’ effort to extradite an associate of the two sons of slain drug baron Ibrahim Akasha from Kenya to the US to face drug trafficking charges.

=== Defense of Waleed Abulkhair ===
In 2015, Arshack joined the defense team of Saudi Arabian lawyer and human rights activist Waleed Abulkhair. In 2015, he traveled to Geneva in order to accept the Ludovic Trarieux International Human Rights Prize on behalf of his client, who remains imprisoned.

=== Anne O’Hare Bynum vs. State of Arkansas ===
In 2018, Arshack served as consulting attorney for National Advocates for Pregnant Women, which represented Anne Bynum’s appeal against the state of Arkansas. Bynum, who had hid her pregnancy from her family, had a stillbirth in her home and was subsequently arrested for concealing a birth. She was initially sentenced to 6 years; Arshack argued and won her appeal. The court reversed the conviction and the prosecutor chose not to re-try her.

== Press ==
Arshack has appeared, in relation to his cases, as a commentator on The Today Show, Nightline with Ted Koppel (1990),The Queen Latifah Show, CBS, NBC and ABC News, Court TV, the BBC, and Al Jazeera. He was interviewed on Fox News in relation to Holmes v. Winter. He appeared on the NPR show The Takeaway to discuss his work representing Waleed Abulkhair. His acceptance speech of the Ludovic Trarieux International Human Rights Prize on Abulkhair's behalf was published as an editorial in the Huffington Post.

== Publications ==
- “It's Just Not OK - Sexual Relations Between Physicians and Their Patients," New York Law Journal, March 7, 2013
- "Due Process for Those Maligned in UN Reports," Journal of the Section of Litigation of the American Bar Association, Vol. 42 No. 1, Fall 2015.
- "Sentencing for Oxycodone Based on Faulty Calculation," New York Law Journal, August 5, 2015.
- "Accusatory Instruments and Jurisdictional Sufficiency," New York Law Journal, March 20, 2015.
- "Ruling Spotlights Dispute Over Attorney Access to Child Services Notes," New York Law Journal, July 6, 2017.
- "Discoverability of Proffer Interview Notes," New York Law Journal, February 14, 2019.

== Affiliations ==
Arshack was elected in 2007 to serve as President of the New York State Association of Criminal Defense Lawyers. He serves on the Board of Directors of the National Association of Criminal Defense Lawyers (NACDL) and is Co-Chairman of its International Committee. He was the elected representative to the Council of the International Criminal Bar and was a member of the Board of Directors of the International Criminal Defense Attorneys Association – USA. He was a founding member of the board of New York Sun Works and of the Center for Restorative Justice. He has been an International Member of Perren Buildings Chambers of London since 2009. Arshack has been on the Board of the Center for Community Alternatives since 2014 and has served as its President since 2017. He is a past president of the Broadway Democratic Club, and founder and president of the Manhattan Valley Neighbors Association.

Arshack’s bar admissions include: District of Columbia Court of Appeals, District of Columbia Circuit Court of Appeals, Pennsylvania Supreme Court, Third Circuit Court of Appeals, New York Appellate Division, First and Second Departments, the Federal Southern, Northern, Eastern and Western Districts of New York and the Second Circuit Court of Appeals .

Arshack’s pro bono legal work includes his role as Mass Defense Counsel to Greenpeace and Rainforest Action Network. He is a founder and was co-chair of the Gay Men’s Health Crisis Institutional Review Board, and has lectured on medical self-advocacy and legal rights for SHARE, a breast cancer self-help organization. He also volunteered for Volunteer Lawyers for The Arts and he continues to serve as consulting attorney for National Advocates for Pregnant Women.

== Personal life and views ==
While a student at Brandeis, Arshack dated Marta Kauffman, best known as the executive producer of the sitcom Friends. In episode 19 of Season 2 ("The One Where Eddie Won’t Go"), Monica accuses Rachel of stealing "Danny Arshack" away from her in the ninth grade.

Arshack has been married three times, and has 2 children from his second marriage. In 1991, he and his second wife Lucy Wicks, who passed from breast cancer in 2000, co-founded an alternative public elementary school on the Upper West Side of Manhattan, the Manhattan School for Children (PS 333). His current wife, Nancey Rosensweig, was a professional modern dancer before becoming a midwife.

Arshack is a staunch opponent of the death penalty. As President of the New York Association of Criminal Defense Lawyers, he appealed to legislators to ensure that New York remains without a death penalty.
