= David Feige =

American legal commentator

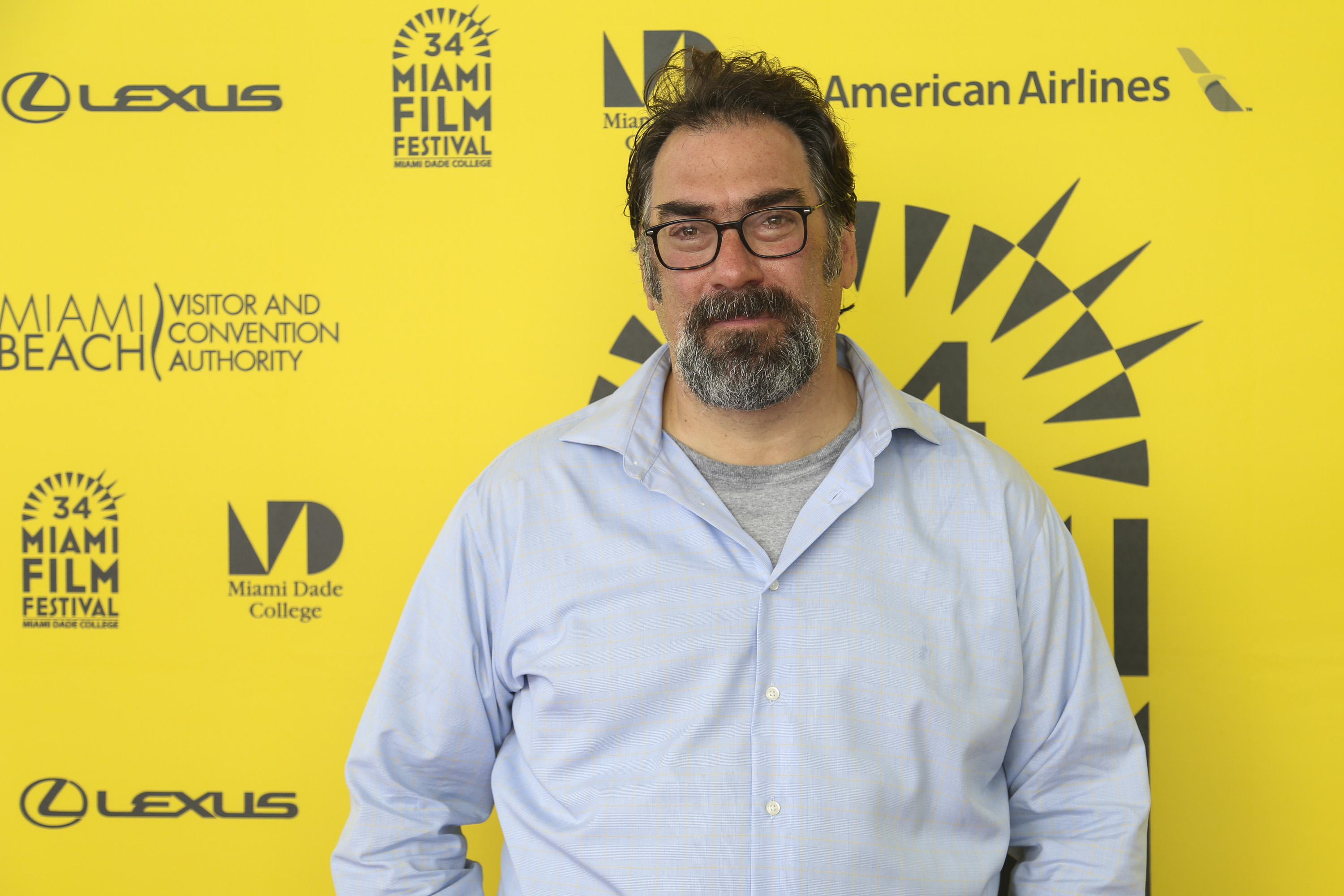
Feige at the Miami Film Festival presentation of Untouchable at Regal Theater on March 11, 2017

David Feige is an American lawyer, legal commentator, and author. He is the author of the memoir Indefensible: One Lawyer's Journey into the Inferno of American Justice and co-creator of the TNT legal drama Raising the Bar, both of which center on the life of the public defender. He is also the co-founder (along with his wife Robin Steinberg) and board chair of The Bronx Freedom Fund, a charitable bail organization in New York State. In 2016 he won the Albert Maysles New Documentary Director Award for Untouchable, a documentary feature he wrote, produced and directed. The film premiered at the Tribeca Film Festival.

== Background ==
Feige was raised in Madison, Wisconsin. His mother was a social worker and his father was an economics professor. Feige pursued his undergraduate studies at University of Chicago. After law school, Feige accepted an offer to work as a public defender in New York City.

== Career ==
Feige began his legal career as a staff attorney at the Criminal Defense Division of the Legal Aid Society, and held positions at the Civilian Complaint Review Board of New York City and the Neighborhood Defender Service of Harlem, before becoming, in 1997, one of the founding members of The Bronx Defenders. In 1999 Feige was promoted to Trial Chief. In March 2001, he filed the first motion for a double-blind sequential line up in People v. Leo Franco, spawning a series of legal challenges to eyewitness identification procedures around the country.

Feige is the author of the 2006 book Indefensible: One Lawyer's Journey into the Inferno of American Justice, which recounts his experiences as a public defender in The Bronx, New York City.

Feige is co-creator with Steven Bochco (who had read Indefensible) of the TV series, Raising the Bar, which debuted on TNT September 1, 2008 to the highest ratings for a pilot episode in the history of ad-supported cable television. It was Feige's first attempt at screenwriting. The action takes place in the courthouses of New York City and the show deals with issues similar to those of Indefensible, though with fictional characters. The show was renewed by the TNT Cable network. He has written or produced over 100 hours of episodic television having also worked as a Consulting Producer and writer on the television shows The Firm and In Contempt. He also served as a Co-Executive Producer on a number of shows, including Drop Dead Diva, the CBS legal drama Doubt, and Daredevil: Born Again, as well as an Executive Producer on the ABC series For Life.

Feige has appeared on Court TV, MSNBC and National Public Radio to comment on legal issues. He has also written about the law for The New York Times, Los Angeles Times, The Washington Post and Boston Globe, and magazines like Fortune, Slate, The New Yorker, and The Nation. He was on the faculty of the National Criminal Defense College at Walter F. George School of Law in Macon, Georgia, and is currently on leave as Professor of Law and Director of Advocacy Programs at Seton Hall University School of Law in Newark, New Jersey.
