= Jana Winter =

American reporter

Jana Winter is an American reporter best known for being first to report that James Holmes had sent a notebook to his University of Colorado psychiatrist Lynn Fenton with details about his premeditated plan to kill people before he allegedly did so. She joined The Intercept in 2014 and worked there through January 2016. Previously she had been a reporter from 2006 to 2008 for the New York Post, and from 2008 to 2014 for Fox News Channel.

== Early life and education ==
She obtained an undergraduate degree from Emory University in 2002, and a masters in journalism from the Columbia University Graduate School of Journalism in 2006.

== LulzSec and "Sabu" ==
While at FoxNews.com, Winter wrote a series of articles exposing Hector Xavier Monsegur as the head of LulzSec, revealing his months-long collaboration with the FBI, and detailing the ultimate takedown by law enforcement officials of the hacker collective. The articles drew worldwide attention.

== Aurora shooting coverage ==
Among the stories Winter reported on was the 2012 Aurora, Colorado shooting. She was the first to report, on July 25, 2012, that shooter James Holmes had sent a notebook to his psychiatrist with details about his planning killings. This caused Holmes' attorney, citing a gag order on law enforcement personnel on the case, to try to order her to reveal her sources, despite the existence of a shield law in Colorado.

The possibility that Winter might be subpoenaed in the case first arose in December 2012, when Holmes' attorneys complained that the details about the notebook must have been leaked, and demanded sanctions against whoever leaked the information. The prosecutors predicted that the defense's attempt to subpoena Winter would add extra delays to the case.

Fox responded to a subpoena issued by Holmes' attorneys by the end of January 2013, stating that Winter would fight any attempts to reveal her sources. Although the story was subject to ongoing press stories by the Associated Press and other news organizations, widespread press attention to the story did not begin until early April 2013, causing some commentators, starting with Fox itself, to suggest the lack of press coverage may be due to Winter's employ by Fox and that the rest of the news media could be biased against it.

At a hearing on April 1, 2013, a Colorado judge said he was reluctant to order Winter to testify and said another police detective needed to be questioned first. He ordered Winter to return to court on April 10. On April 5, 2013, the National Press Club issued a statement asking the judge to abandon attempts to get Winter to reveal her sources. On April 8, 2013, the judge announced he was deferring any ruling on the issue, as he has not decided yet whether the notebook (the only strand upon which Winter's testimony could be sought by the defense) will be admissible at trial.

On May 27, 2014, the Supreme Court denied the appeal brought by Daniel Arshack, one of the lawyers for James Holmes, essentially blocking any effort to force Jana Winter to reveal her source in court.
