= Robin Steinberg =

American lawyer

Robin Steinberg is an American lawyer and the chief executive officer of the Bail Project, an organization modeled after The Bronx Freedom Fund, which she founded with her husband David Feige in 2007. Steinberg is also the founder of The Bronx Defenders and Still She Rises in Tulsa.

== Early life and education ==
Steinberg was born and raised in New York City in a Jewish household. After graduating from the University of California, Berkeley in 1978 with a degree in Women’s Studies, Steinberg moved back to New York to attend the New York University School of Law to begin a career in women’s rights law. During her time at NYU Law, Steinberg enrolled in a clinic called the Women’s Prison Project.

== Career ==
=== The Bail Project ===
In November 2017, Steinberg launched The Bail Project, a national nonprofit that provides free bail assistance and pretrial support to thousands of low-income people every year. The organization works with public defense offices and community partners in more than a dozen cities, posting bail for people in need and supporting them through court reminders, transportation assistance, and voluntary referrals to social services. Assets of $22,547,817 and income of $24,783,751 were reported in 2018.

In April 2019, a St. Louis man who received free bail assistance from The Bail Project was charged with fatally injuring his wife after being released pretrial. In response to the incident, Steinberg said, "No one could have predicted this tragedy. It’s important to remember that had he been wealthy enough to afford his bail, or bonded out by a commercial bail bond agency, he would have been free pretrial as well. In times like this, we must come together for this family and keep sight of the need to transform the larger systems that create poverty, racism and violence, including the pretrial bail system." The Riverfront Times, a publication in St. Louis, wrote that The Bail Project had simply posted a bail amount that had been set by the local criminal justice system, adding, "If a friend or relative of Scott had posted the bail, no one would be blaming that person for the ensuing tragedy, nor should they. Ditto for a bail bondsman."

=== Still She Rises ===
In January 2017, Steinberg launched Still She Rises, Tulsa, a project of The Bronx Defenders and the first public defender office in the country dedicated exclusively to the representation of women with children in the criminal justice system. Oklahoma incarcerates a higher percentage of women than any other state and more than double the national average. Still She Rises brings the holistic model of public defense pioneered by The Bronx Defenders to low-income women in the North Tulsa community.

=== Center for Holistic Defense ===
In 2010, Steinberg received funding from the Department of Justice’s Bureau of Justice Assistance to begin the Center for Holistic Defense, the training and technical assistance arm of The Bronx Defenders. Each year for five years, the Center selected between three and six defender offices for intensive training, including site visits at defenders’ offices and The Bronx Defenders, on how to adopt holistic defense practices. Steinberg has trained over 25 defender offices, ranging from large, statewide public defender systems such as the Wisconsin State Public Defender to small, local groups like the Tribal Defenders for the Confederated Salish and Kootenai Tribes in Montana.

=== The Bronx Defenders ===
In 1997, Steinberg and a small group of advocates founded The Bronx Defenders, a community-based public defender office in the South Bronx. The Bronx Defenders now has a staff of over 300 attorneys, advocates, and social workers who represent more than 35,000 low-income New Yorkers each year.
