= Raising the Bar (2008 TV series) =

American legal television drama

- Genre: Legal drama
- Created by: Steven Bochco; David Feige
- Starring: Mark-Paul Gosselaar; Gloria Reuben; Teddy Sears; J. August Richards; Melissa Sagemiller; Jane Kaczmarek; Currie Graham; Natalia Cigliuti
- Theme music composer: Richard Stone; Philip de Souza
- Composer: Alec Puro
- Country of origin: United States
- Original language: English
- No. of seasons: 2
- No. of episodes: 25

Production
- Executive producer: Steven Bochco
- Producers: Jonathan Abrahams; Dayna Kalin Bochco; David Feige; Caroline James
- Cinematography: Baz Irvine
- Editor: Rick Hinson
- Running time: 45–48 minutes
- Production companies: Steven Bochco Productions; ABC Studios

Original release
- Network: TNT
- Release: September 1, 2008 – December 24, 2009

Raising the Bar is an American legal drama created by Steven Bochco and David Feige that ran on TNT from September 1, 2008, to December 24, 2009.

== Plot ==
Idealistic public defender Jerry Kellerman does whatever it takes to assist the helpless and disenfranchised, which often leads to clashes in the courtroom presided over by Judge Trudy Kessler, a hard-liner hoping to become the city's next district attorney. Jerry has many clashes with both law enforcement and the assistant district attorneys (ADAs) such as Michelle Ernhardt, the beautiful and occasionally devious attorney with whom he has had a turbulent secret fling.

== Cast and characters ==
- Mark-Paul Gosselaar as Jerry Kellerman
- Gloria Reuben as Rosalind Whitman
- Jane Kaczmarek as Trudy Kessler
- Melissa Sagemiller as Michelle Earnhardt
- Jonathan Scarfe as Charlie Sagansky
- J. August Richards as Marcus McGrath
- Currie Graham as Nick Balco
- Teddy Sears as Richard Patrick Woolsley
- Natalia Cigliuti as Roberta "Bobbi" Gilardi

=== Recurring ===
- Stacy Hall as Vince Culp
- Jon Polito as Judge Dominick Ventimigla
- Paul Joyner as Assistant District Attorney
- John Michael Higgins as Judge Albert Farnsworth
- Heath Freeman as Gavin Dillon
- Angel Oquendo as Carlos
- Octavia Spencer as Arvina Watkins
- Max Greenfield as David Steinberg
- Josh Randall as Tim Porter
- Wilson Cruz as Rafael de la Cruz

== Production ==
Raising the Bar was originally announced to be joining TNT as a new series in January 2008. It came to TNT through ABC Studios and Steven Bochco served as executive producer, with Jesse Bochco as co-executive producer and David Feige as supervising producer. After completing its first season of 10 hour-long episodes in November 2008, the series was renewed for a 15-episode second season, which premiered on Monday June 8, 2009, at 10 p.m. Eastern Time/9 p.m. Central Time. The show was canceled after season 2.

== Episodes ==
=== Season 1 (2008) ===
No.	Title	Directed by	Written by	Original release date
1	"Pilot"	Jesse Bochco	Steven Bochco & David Feige	September 1, 2008
2	"Guatemala Gulfstream"	Jesse Bochco	Jonathan Abrahams	September 8, 2008
3	"I Will, I'm Will"	Jeannot Szwarc	Alison Cross	September 15, 2008
4	"Richie Richer"	Bobby Roth	David Feige	September 22, 2008
5	"Bagels and Locks"	Eric Laneuville	Jonathan Abrahams	September 29, 2008
6	"Hang Time"	Chris Long	David Feige	October 6, 2008
7	"A Leg to Stand On"	Carol Banker	Alison Cross	October 13, 2008
8	"Out on the Roof"	Rick Bota	Jonathan Abrahams	October 20, 2008
9	"Roman Holiday"	Rick Wallace	David Feige	October 27, 2008
10	"Shop Till You Drop"	Jesse Bochco	Alison Cross	November 3, 2008

=== Season 2 (2009) ===
No.	Title	Directed by	Written by	Original release date	US viewers (millions)
11	"Hair Apparent"	Jesse Bochco	Jonathan Abrahams	June 8, 2009	3.57
12	"Rules of Engagement"	Eric Laneuville	Alison Cross	June 15, 2009	3.45
13	"The Curious Case of Kellerman’s Button"	Jesse Bochco	Alison Cross	June 22, 2009	3.06
14	"No Child’s Left Behind"	Rick Bota	Joel Fields	June 29, 2009	N/A
15	"Is There a Doctor in the House?"	Jeannot Szwarc	Jonathan Abrahams	July 6, 2009	N/A
16	"I'll Be Down to Get You a Taxi, Honey"	Martha Mitchell	Tassie Cameron	July 13, 2009	3.44
17	"Fine and Dandy"	Jesse Bochco	David Feige	July 20, 2009	3.20
18	"Trust Me"	Tricia Brock	Joel Fields	July 27, 2009	3.54
19	"Trout Fishing"	Steve Robin	Jonathan Abrahams	August 3, 2009	3.42
20	"Making Up Is Hard to Do"	Reginald Hudlin	Alison Cross	August 10, 2009	3.06
21	"Bobbi Ba-Bing"	Jesse Bochco	David Feige	August 17, 2009	3.47
22	"Beating a Dead Horse"	Rick Bota	Joel Fields	August 24, 2009	3.39
23	"Maybe, Baby"	Martha Mitchell	Jonathan Abrahams	December 24, 2009	N/A
24	"O! Say Can You Pee"	Jeannot Szwarc	Alison Cross	December 24, 2009	N/A
25	"Happy Ending"	Jesse Bochco	David Feige & Joel Fields	December 24, 2009	N/A

== Cancellation ==
TNT confirmed to E! Online on November 30, 2009 that the series would not be renewed for a third season. The final three episodes were burned off in a marathon December 24, 2009.

== Reception ==
The series debut garnered 7.7 million viewers. It was the biggest audience ever for a new-series launch on basic cable. It beat the record set in 2004 by USA Network's launch of The 4400 which opened with an average of 7.4 million viewers; runner-up was TNT's The Closer, which recorded 7 million viewers when it was unveiled in 2005. Following the premiere, ratings evened out to around 5.5 million viewers per episode. For calendar-year 2008 on a first-run basis, the series delivered 1.37 million viewers in the 18–49 demographic, garnering mixed reviews.

== Home media ==
DVD name	Release date	Ep #
The Complete First Season	June 2, 2009	10
The Complete Second and Final Season	May 11, 2010	15
