= The Bronx Defenders =

Public defense organization in New York City

- Established: 1997; 29 years ago
- Founders: Robin Steinberg, David Feige, Daniel Arshack, and five other founders.
- Type: Non-profit
- Region served: The Bronx
- Services: Public defender
- Executive Director: Juval O. Scott
- Staff: 400 (2026)
- Website: www.bronxdefenders.org

Bronx Defenders is a public defender office located in the South Bronx neighborhood of New York City. At the Bronx Defenders, criminal defense lawyers work together with civil lawyers, family defense lawyers, immigration lawyers, non-attorney advocates, social workers, and investigators to help their clients address the full range of legal and social issues that can result from criminal charges.

== History ==
Founded in 1997 by a team of eight advocates, including its former executive director Robin Steinberg, David Feige, and criminal defense attorney Daniel Arshack, The Bronx Defenders is responsible for developing holistic defense, an interdisciplinary model of lawyering that builds a team of lawyers, social workers, and advocates from different areas of expertise based on a client's case. The Bronx Defenders is also host to The Bronx Freedom Fund, the first charitable bail organization in New York State.

In late 2023, Justine Olderman stepped down from her position as executive director. She held the post for six years, and was the second ever in the position, being appointed by founder Robin Steinberg. Wesley Caines served as interim executive director. In June 2024, the Board of Directors announced the appointment of Juval O. Scott, a nationally recognized leader in public defense, civil rights, and sentencing reform, as the next executive director of The Bronx Defenders. Juval is the first African American and woman of color to lead the organization in its 27-year history. Her tenure began in September 2025.

As of 2026, the office employs more than 400 people. Employees can become members of The Association of Legal Advocates and Attorneys – UAW Local 2325.

On July 27, 2026, members of The Bronx Defenders union went on an 11-day strike calling for higher wages for all employees, including social workers, investigators, and administrative staff—not just attorneys. On August 11, 2026, workers returned to work after reaching a tentative deal.

== Contract ==
The Bronx Defenders are a contracted public defender for New York City, along with the Legal Aid Society, New York County Defender Services in Manhattan, Brooklyn Defender Services in Brooklyn, Queens Law Associates in Queens, and the Neighborhood Defender Service in Harlem.

== Recognition ==
In recent years, the Bronx Defenders has received national attention and praise for its work providing holistic defense to indigent residents of the Bronx, including the National Legal Aid & Defender Association’s Clara Shortridge Foltz Award.

== See also ==
- The Legal Aid Society
- New York City Criminal Court
