= The Bronx Freedom Fund =

- Established: March 2009; 17 years ago
- Founders: Robin Steinberg and David Feige
- Type: charitable bail organization
- Legal status: 501(c)(3)
- Purpose: humanitarian
- Headquarters: 360 East 161st Street, Bronx, NY 10451
- Location: The Bronx, New York City
- Services: bail services
- Key people: Jason Flom
- Affiliations: The Bronx Defenders
- Website: thebronxfreedomfund.org

The Bronx Freedom Fund is a nonprofit bail fund located in the South Bronx. The first charitable bail organization in New York State, it provides bail assistance to indigent defendants facing pretrial detention for low-level and misdemeanor charges. It was founded by David Feige, a producer, writer, and law professor, and Robin Steinberg, the founder and chief executive of The Bronx Defenders. Its first grant came from the CEO of Lava Records, Jason Flom, and the Flom Family Foundation.

== Details ==
The Bronx Freedom Fund bailed out nearly 200 people from 2007 to 2009. It closed in 2009 after Judge Ralph Fabrizio ruled that it was an uninsured bail-bond business. Its co-founders, along with state senator Gustavo Rivera and then-assemblymen Phil Boyle, drafted a set of amendments allowing for a charitable exemption to the bail and insurance laws. The bill, sponsored by Senator Rivera, passed unanimously through both chambers of the state legislature in 2011. It was vetoed by Governor Andrew Cuomo, and a revised bill passed in 2012.

The Bronx Freedom Fund reopened its doors and began to post bail, freeing hundreds of people between 2013 and 2015.

In 2015, The Bronx Freedom Fund began a substantial expansion, raising additional funds, hiring new bail associates and significantly increasing its capacity, including expanding operations into other boroughs. The Freedom Fund is on track to bail out over 1,000 people per year. Also in 2015, the organization was awarded the National Criminal Justice Association's Outstanding Criminal Justice Program Award for the Northeast Region.

In October 2017, the Bronx Freedom Fund teamed up with The New Inquiry's project, Bail Bloc, which was a distributed cryptocurrency mining software that mined Monero and used the proceeds to bail people out of jail.

In November 2017, the Bronx Freedom Fund expanded again, re-launching as The Bail Project with the aim of establishing 40 bail funds across the nation to free over 150,000 people.

The Bronx Freedom Fund (and the Bail Project) have occasionally bailed out people who later went on to commit crimes.

== See also ==
- 2019 New York bail reform
