= Bail fund =

Organization that collects money to pay bail

A bail fund is an organization, often charitable, community and volunteer-driven, or both, that collects money for the purpose of posting monetary bail for those in jail on pre-trial detention. Recipients may include those who cannot afford bail on their own or those who are in jail due to being arrested while protesting. Community bail funds determine their own criteria for eligibility and amount of bail that they will support. As of 2024, there are over 90 community bail funds around the United States represented in the National Bail Fund Network.

Bail funds are related to bail reform efforts, as by paying individual bails, funds help directly address the disparities in case outcomes faced by those in pre-trial detention who are unable to post bail. Being unable to pay bail, and thus staying in jail longer before trial, means that defendants who cannot afford bail may have issues with managing or keeping employment, childcare, housing, or mounting an effective defense in their case, leading to poorer case outcomes. The Vera Institute of Justice found that in 2013 in New York, 54% of inmates who remained in jail until their cases were disposed could not afford their bail of $2500 or less. In 2020, the Prison Policy Initiative found that over half a million people were in jail or prison on pre-trial detention in the United States at any given time, many because they could not afford bail.

== Operation ==
Though community bail funds vary in how they raise money, decide on applicant eligibility, and manage the logistics of posting bail, the basic principles are the same. Monetary bail is set after arrest as a guarantee to ensure that suspects return to court for trial. Bail is paid to the court as a deposit that is returned at the conclusion of a case. This means that bail funds that post bail receive the money back (minus fees) when the individual bailed out returns to court and completes their case, enabling the bail fund to reuse the money for another bail. Bail funds are differentiated from other methods of paying bail in that they are often unconnected to the individuals who receive bail.

== History ==
=== United States ===
The history of bail funds dates back to the 1920s when the American Civil Liberties Union set up a bail fund to release people arrested under harsh Department of Justice policies against people suspected of sedition during the First Red Scare. Bail funds also supported people fighting against segregation and other racist laws in the Jim Crow South during the Civil Rights movement of the 1960s. In 2012, New York passed the only law related to bail funds in the United States when it legalized charitable bail funds that posted bails of $2000 or less, which led to the revival of The Bronx Freedom Fund and the creation of the Brooklyn Bail Fund. During the George Floyd protests of 2020, bail funds mobilized millions of dollars to free protestors and community members.

== See also ==
- Bail bondsman
- Bail in the United States
