= True Blood season 7 =

True Blood
- Season 7
- DVD cover
- No. of episodes: 10

Release
- Original network: HBO
- Original release: June 22 – August 24, 2014

Season chronology
- ← Previous; Season 6

The seventh and final season of the HBO supernatural drama series True Blood premiered on June 22, 2014 and contained ten episodes. The season was ordered on July 15, 2013. At the beginning of September it was announced that it would be the final season. The season was preceded by a farewell special titled "Farewell to Bon Temps", in which executive producers Alan Ball and Brian Buckner united with various cast members to reminisce about the series and gave a special preview of the final season.

== Cast and characters ==
=== Main cast ===
- Anna Paquin as Sookie Stackhouse
- Stephen Moyer as Bill Compton
- Sam Trammell as Sam Merlotte
- Ryan Kwanten as Jason Stackhouse
- Rutina Wesley as Tara Thornton
- Alexander Skarsgård as Eric Northman
- Chris Bauer as Andy Bellefleur
- Kristin Bauer van Straten as Pam Swynford De Beaufort
- Amelia Rose Blaire as Willa Burrell
- Lauren Bowles as Holly Cleary
- Tara Buck as Ginger
- Anna Camp as Sarah Newlin
- Gregg Daniel as Reverend Daniels
- Nelsan Ellis as Lafayette Reynolds
- Aaron Christian Howles as Rocky Cleary
- Joe Manganiello as Alcide Herveaux
- Noah Matthews as Wade Cleary
- Bailey Noble as Adilyn Bellefleur
- Jim Parrack as Hoyt Fortenberry
- Nathan Parsons as James Kent
- Adina Porter as Lettie Mae Daniels
- Carrie Preston as Arlene Fowler Bellefleur
- Jurnee Smollett-Bell as Nicole Wright
- Deborah Ann Woll as Jessica Hamby
- Karolina Wydra as Violet Mazurski

=== Special guest cast ===
- Robert Patrick as Jackson Herveaux
- Michael McMillian as Steve Newlin
- Jessica Tuck as Nan Flanagan
- Todd Lowe as Terry Bellefleur
- Rutger Hauer as Niall Brigant
- Lois Smith as Adele Stackhouse

=== Guest cast ===
- Patricia Bethune as Jane Bodehouse
- Tanya Wright as Deputy Kenya Jones
- Riley Smith as Keith
- Will Yun Lee as Mr. Gus
- John Rezig as Deputy Kevin Ellis
- Tess Alexandra Parker as Rosie
- Brett Rickaby as Vince McNeil
- Paula Jai Parker as Karen
- Dustin Ingram as Ronnie
- Shannon Lucio as Caroline Compton
- Ashley Hinshaw as Brigette
- Isabella Rice as Sarah Compton
- Dale Raoul as Maxine Fortenberry
- Robert Baker as Mack
- Lucas Adams as Lou
- Eugene Byrd as Jerome
- Brianne Davis as Belinda
- Chelsea Ricketts as Lucinda
- Natalie Hall as Amber Mills
- John W. Godley as Big John Dickson
- Brian Poth as Matt
- Stacy Haiduk as Jenny
- Louis Ozawa Changchien as Hiroki
- Shishir Kurup as Guru Sanbir Dutta
- Gilbert Uwuor as Minus
- Matthew Holmes as Charles Dupont
- Paul Rae as Dark Figure
- Maz Jobrani as Moroccan Proprietor
- David Bickford as Reverend Skinner
- Arthur Darbinyan as Najat
- Massi Furlan as Nizar
- Lily Knight as Betty Harris
- Gabriella Wright as Sylvie
- Drew Rausch as Julian Fortenberry
- Željko Ivanek as The Magister
- Christian Pitre as Victoria
- Jamie Luner as Amanda
- Bess Armstrong as Nancy Mills
- Brett Rice as Paul Mills
- Kathleen York as Madeline Kapnek
- Michael Rothhaar as William Compton Sr.
- Marcia de Rousse as Dr. Ludwig
- Malcolm Goodwin as Joe Thornton

== Episodes ==
No. overall	No. in season	Title	Directed by	Written by	Original release date	US viewers (millions)
71	1	"Jesus Gonna Be Here"	Stephen Moyer	Angela Robinson	June 22, 2014	4.03
Picking up immediately where Season 6 left off, a large group of Hep-V vampires attack Bon Temps in full force, leaving many casualties, but they are called off by an unseen person. They abduct Arlene, Holly, a heavily pregnant Nicole and several other people. Tara dies in the attack, leaving an injured and manic Lettie Mae crying for her daughter. Willa feeds her some vampire blood to heal her; this causes Lettie Mae V-induced hallucinations to take on the form of Tara. Meanwhile, Jason finally mans up to Violet and has sex with her. Elsewhere in Morocco, Pam is still looking for Eric, placing her own life in danger for information. Back in Bon Temps, Jessica tries her best to gain Adilyn and Andy's trust, while James keeps Lafayette company at his house. A local named Vince spots Sam shifting. Despite being able to hear all the hateful thoughts from the redneck townspeople, Sookie pleads with them to let her help.
72	2	"I Found You"	Howard Deutch	Kate Barnow	June 29, 2014	3.06
Jason has a sexual dream about Eric. At Fangtasia, Arlene and Holly come up with a plan to escape, but things don't go as expected as their captor Betty is reluctant to help. The insane Lettie Mae's obsession to see and talk to Tara's ghost causes her to take extreme actions by burning herself and asking Willa to feed some of her blood again to heal her. Meanwhile, Sookie, Andy, Alcide, Jason and Sam go to the small town of Saint Alice to find out if anybody survived. They find a mass grave and a ghost town. With their mayor and sheriff gone, the people of Bon Temps take matters into their own hands when Vince forms a vigilante group to kill all supernatural entities. Jessica tries frantically to help Adilyn, who has been captured by the rowdy townsfolk and is imprisoned in the town jail. Sookie seeks Bill's help. At the end, Pam finally finds Eric residing in France, but their reunion isn't a happy one as he has become infected by Hep-V.
73	3	"Fire in the Hole"	Lee Rose	Brian Buckner	July 6, 2014	3.20
In France, Pam tries fruitlessly to convince the world-weary Eric to not give up on life despite that he is Hep-V positive and will die soon. Eric flashes back to 1986 France and remembers his involvement with the human daughter of a winery owner, and his choice to make when Nan Flannigan and The Vampire Authority showed up. In the present, Pam finally gets a reaction from Eric when she tells him that Sarah Newlin is still alive. Meanwhile, Sarah has settled into a new life as the lover of a guru, but she is forced to flee from a team of ninja assassins who come hunting for her. In Bon Temps, Sookie and Bill set their plan into motion to use her as bait for the Hep-V vampires. Meanwhile, Lafayette and James spend the night bonding and getting high once again. A shootout ends in tragedy when the Hep-V vampires find Sookie- and Alcide is killed in the crossfire, while Maxine Fortenberry and several townsfolk are killed when Hep-V vampires attack the vigilante mob. A traumatized Holly is used as bait by the Hep-V vampires, but is rescued.
74	4	"Death Is Not the End"	Gregg Fienberg	Daniel Kenneth	July 13, 2014	3.23
Sookie and Jason each make phone calls to Jackson and Hoyt to inform them of the death of their family members. Meanwhile, Eric decides to make a detour to Bon Temps to see Willa (and Sookie), dragging a reluctant Pam along. Meanwhile, James stages an intervention for Jessica, who hasn't fed since she accidentally killed Adilyn's three sisters. Also, the origins how Eric became Vampire Sheriff are revealed which involves him and Pam forced by the Magistrate to operate a local video store in 1986, how Ginger came into their lives 10 years later, and how another 10 years later in 2006 that Ginger suggested opening up the Fangtasia nightclub for vampires (which Pam admits to stealing, but immediately forgiven by Eric.). Sookie probes Holly's mind and finds out that Arlene and Nicole are being kept in the basement at Fangtasia. She rounds up her friends, including Eric, to go and save them, but their attempted rescue coincides with an attack by the anti-vampire mob from Bon Temps.
75	5	"Lost Cause"	Howard Deutch	Craig Chester	July 20, 2014	3.57
Lafayette and James throw a 'celebration of life' party at Sookie's in the wake of Alcide's death and convince her to get dressed and look appropriate. In Dallas, Eric and Pam pay Sarah Newlin's vampire sister, Amber Mills, a visit; they learn Sarah's in Dallas and will be at a gala party. Bill reminisces his past before going to war with the Yankees during the Civil War. Meanwhile, Lettie Mae drugs her husband so she can be present at the town party. Andy forgives Jessica for killing his half-faeie daughters, telling her he can't move on if she tortures herself and he gets help proposing to an ecstatic Holly. Arlene gives Sookie tips on getting over the loss of a loved one. Meanwhile Lafayette and James get really intimate much to Jessica's chagrin. While getting dressed, Pam and Eric discover his illness has worsened. Arlene gets noticed by 500-year-old vampire Keith, who saved her life in Fangtasia. Lafayette confronts Jessica telling her she doesn't deserve James because she doesn't care about him. Lettie Mae's obsession to talk with Tara causes her to take a violent action which in turn gets her thrown out of the party. Nicole gives the townsfolk a piece of her honest mind and leaves with Sam. Jason and Jessica have sex while Violet listens through the door unbeknownst to them. In Dallas, the Yakuza disrupts the gala party and leave many casualties. Sarah Newlin and her mother Nancy try to escape but Nancy ends up dead. At the end, Bill suddenly discovers he is Hep-V positive - due to drinking from Sookie, who had unknowingly become a carrier due to exposure through a cut on her wrist.
76	6	"Karma"	Angela Robinson	Angela Robinson	July 27, 2014	3.38
In Dallas, Eric briefly captures Sarah Newlin to torture and kill her, but he ends up fighting the Yakuza; he and Pam are captured, and Sarah escapes yet again. In Bon Temps, Lafayette indulges Lettie Mae with vampire blood and realizes she may not just be hallucinating about Tara's ghost. Meanwhile, Violet retaliates following Jason's infidelity by luring away Andy and Holly's children after Andy finds Wade in bed with Adilyn. Jessica makes a shocking discovery about Bill after she overhears him on the phone talking about his being Hep-V positive, and Sookie receives some bad news. Bill attempts to will his property to Jessica, but is confronted by multiple obstacles (including the unusually rapid progression of his illness) and vents his frustration before returning home, to find Sookie and Jessica waiting for him. Also, Nicole tells Sam that she wants to leave Bon Temps and return to her home in California, but Sam doesn't want to leave the only home he knows. Elsewhere, Sarah seeks shelter with her estranged vampire sister Amber (who is also dying of Hep V), where she reveals that because she drank the Hep V antidote during her escape from the labs, she is now a walking cure for it.
77	7	"May Be the Last Time"	Simon Jayes	Craig Chester	August 3, 2014	3.39
Hoyt arrives in Bon Temps with his girlfriend Brigette to identify his mother's body. Violet invites Adilyn and Wade to her house to give them privacy, but her motives for doing so are soon revealed. Meanwhile, Eric and Pam agree to cooperate with Mr. Gus and the Yakanomo corporation in the search for Sarah who want to take her to Japan to put her on trial for the murder of their rep (earlier in Season 6), but Eric only has one real interest; to kill Sarah in the most violent way for everything she has done. Sarah, meanwhile, is hiding out in the former headquarters of the Fellowship of the Sun, hallucinating about her former husband Steve. Sookie attempts to get help for Bill first from Dr. Ludwig and then from Niall Brigand; the latter tells her even his magic cannot save Bill, and she must accept his oncoming death. Sarah faces the demons from her past. Also, Bill continues to reminisce about his life in the 1860s before he was turned. Nicole tells Sam she doesn't want to raise their unborn daughter in a place as dangerous as Bon Temps and gives him a choice: Bon Temps or her. At the end, Sookie returns to Bill, determined to be with him again before he dies.
78	8	"Almost Home"	Jesse Warn	Kate Barnow	August 10, 2014	3.34
Sarah is found and captured by Eric, Pam and Mr. Gus; upon drinking from her, Eric is almost instantly cured of his Hep-V. Meanwhile, Lettie Mae and Lafayette convince Reverend Daniels to join them in their search for Tara's spirit. Jason steps into a trap in an effort to save Jessica, Adilyn and Wade from Violet, but help comes from an unexpected source: Hoyt who suddenly appears, kills Violet and saves everyone. Sarah is kept prisoner by Eric, Pam and the Yakanomo corporation in the basement of Fangtasia, but neither the vampires nor the Yakuza trust one another. Jessica and Hoyt get reacquainted. Also, Eric reveals the existence of the Hep-V cure to Sookie and offers to heal Bill, but when Bill is pressured to drink from Sarah by Sookie, Eric and Jessica, he unexpectedly refuses.
79	9	"Love Is to Die"	Howard Deutch	Brian Buckner	August 17, 2014	3.56
Sookie and Jessica are left devastated after Bill decides not to drink the antidote; as a result Jessica asks Bill to release her from his maker bond. Jessica visits Hoyt to tell him of their history together, causing Brigette and Hoyt to break up. Sookie and Jessica discover that Sam has left town with Nicole to start a new life. Afterwards, Jason looks after a heartbroken Brigette and they bond in an unexpected way, while at the same time Jessica and Hoyt reconcile. Bill asks Eric to help persuade Sookie to hear him out. Meanwhile, the Yakanomo corporation finds out that Eric and Pam have revealed the Hep-V antidote to Sookie.
80	10	"Thank You"	Scott Winant	Brian Buckner	August 24, 2014	4.04
In the series finale, Eric and Pam slaughter the entire Yakanomo members as well as Mr. Gus (saving Sookie one last time in the process) and take Sarah Newlin hostage. Bill finally convinces Sookie to accept his decision to die, but she balks at his request to kill him with her Fae powers (which would reduce her to human and, in his eyes, give her the "normal life" that he believes she deserves). Bill meets with Jessica and Hoyt and requests that he be allowed to give Jessica away in marriage before his death; the wedding proceeds, with Jason, Andy, Arlene, Holly and Sookie attending. Bill makes his final peace with Andy (his last living descendant) by leaving him his house and land, with the condition that Jessica and Hoyt be allowed to live there for $1 a month rent. Seeing Jason's real connection with Brigette, Sookie gives him her approval. After getting some advice from Reverend Daniels, Sookie meets Bill at nighttime in the Bon Temps cemetery. She ultimately refuses to give up her Fae powers, saying that, like Bill, they are a part of her. After expressing her love for him one more time, she helps Bill stake himself as he lies in the coffin of his own grave from the Civil War. She then fills in the grave with dirt and walks home in tears. Four years later, Eric and Pam are running a multi-billion dollar corporation called New Blood; having claimed that they found a "sample" of Sarah Newlin's blood after she escaped them, they have synthesized a cure for Hep V and a new food source for vampires. However, Pam is seen to secretly keep Sarah imprisoned in Fangtasia's basement, charging vampires a fortune to feed on her, while Eric sits on his throne on the Fangtasia stage. Sarah is haunted by the vengeful spirit of her former husband, Steve. Meanwhile, Sookie (now married to an unnamed man and expecting a child) and Jason (married to Brigette, with three kids) host a Thanksgiving party in Bon Temps, which includes new and old faces (Sam and his family arrive for the party), and vampire and human couples alike. The series ends with the Led Zeppelin song, "Thank you", playing over the end credits.

== Ratings ==
Episode number (Production number)	Title	Original air date	Ratings share (Adults 18–49)	Viewers (in millions)	Rank per week on Cable
71 (7.01)	"Jesus Gonna Be Here"	June 22, 2014	2.2	4.03	#10
72 (7.02)	"I Found You"	June 29, 2014	1.6	3.06	#23
73 (7.03)	"Fire in the Hole"	July 6, 2014	1.7	3.20	#22
74 (7.04)	"Death Is Not the End"	July 13, 2014	1.7	3.23	#19
75 (7.05)	"Lost Cause"	July 20, 2014	1.9	3.57	#13
76 (7.06)	"Karma"	July 27, 2014	1.8	3.38	#11
77 (7.07)	"May Be the Last Time"	August 3, 2014	1.7	3.39	#14
78 (7.08)	"Almost Home"	August 10, 2014	1.8	3.34	#13
79 (7.09)	"Love Is to Die"	August 17, 2014	1.8	3.56	#14
80 (7.10)	"Thank You"	August 24, 2014	2.1	4.04	#8

== Production ==
A seventh season was ordered on July 15, 2013, and was later announced to be the final season. Brian Buckner continued as executive producer and showrunner.

At the end of December 2013, actor Luke Grimes, who had portrayed the vampire James in the sixth season, asked to be released from his contract over creative differences (according to cast and crew Grimes didn't want to play the role once he found out his character was going to be bisexual in season seven). Australian actor Nathan Parsons was later announced as his replacement. After having recurring roles as Ginger and Lettie Mae Thornton since the first season, both Tara Buck and Adina Porter were promoted to series regulars.

Filming on the final episode wrapped in the early hours of July 10, 2014. Charlaine Harris, author of the series of novels on which the show is based, filmed a cameo for the series finale (she was director for Eric and Pam's commercial).
