= True Blood season 6 =

True Blood
- Season 6
- Region 1 DVD cover
- No. of episodes: 10

Release
- Original network: HBO
- Original release: June 16 – August 18, 2013

Season chronology
- ← Previous; Season 5 Next → Season 7

The sixth season of the HBO supernatural drama series True Blood premiered on June 16, 2013. The season had an abbreviated run of ten episodes, as opposed to the usual twelve, partially to accommodate the pregnancy of lead actress Anna Paquin. It is also the first season not to be primarily based on the corresponding novel in The Southern Vampire Mysteries series (in this case Definitely Dead), instead taking elements from multiple books in the series.

== Cast and characters ==
=== Main cast ===
- Anna Paquin as Sookie Stackhouse
- Stephen Moyer as Bill Compton
- Sam Trammell as Sam Merlotte
- Ryan Kwanten as Jason Stackhouse
- Rutina Wesley as Tara Thornton
- Alexander Skarsgård as Eric Northman
- Chris Bauer as Andy Bellefleur
- Kristin Bauer van Straten as Pam Swynford De Beaufort
- Lauren Bowles as Holly Cleary
- Anna Camp as Sarah Newlin
- Nelsan Ellis as Lafayette Reynolds
- Lucy Griffiths as Nora Gainesborough
- Rutger Hauer as Niall Brigant
- Arliss Howard as Governor Truman Burrell
- Rob Kazinsky as Ben Flynn / Macklyn Warlow
- Todd Lowe as Terry Bellefleur
- Joe Manganiello as Alcide Herveaux
- Michael McMillian as Steve Newlin
- Kelly Overton as Rikki Naylor
- Robert Patrick as Jackson Herveaux
- Carrie Preston as Arlene Fowler Bellefleur
- Jurnee Smollett-Bell as Nicole Wright
- Deborah Ann Woll as Jessica Hamby

=== Special guest cast ===
- Dale Dickey as Martha Bozeman
- Adina Porter as Lettie Mae Daniels
- Janina Gavankar as Luna Garza

=== Guest cast ===
- Amelia Rose Blaire as Willa Burrell
- Bailey Noble as 18–Year–Old Faerie #4 / Adilyn Bellefleur
- Chloe East as 11-Year-Old Faerie Girl #3
- Karolina Wydra as Violet Mazurski
- Luke Grimes as James Kent
- John Fleck as Dr. Overlark
- Jamie Gray Hyder as Danielle
- Chloe Noelle as Emma Garza
- Marque Richardson as Kenneth
- Pruitt Taylor Vince as Finn
- Keone Young as Hido Takahashi
- Jeffrey Nicholas Brown as Corbett Stackhouse
- Tara Buck as Ginger
- Jessica Clark as Lilith
- Matt Cook as Jessie
- Courtney Ford as Portia Bellefleur
- Aaron Howles as Rocky Cleary
- Noah Matthews as Wade Cleary
- John Rezig as Deputy Kevin Ellis
- Jenni Blong as Michelle Stackhouse
- Shaun Brown as Bruce
- Gregg Daniel as Reverend Daniels
- Jessy Hodges as Mustard
- Helen Slayton-Hughes as Caroline Bellefleur
- Valarie Pettiford as Mary Wright
- Tamlyn Tomita as Ms. Suzuki
- Patricia Bethune as Jane Bodehouse
- Giles Matthey as Claude Crane
- Hal Ozsan as King Charles II
- John Prosky as David Finch
- Dale Raoul as Maxine Fortenberry
- Haley Brooke Walker as Crystal
- Jude B. Lanston as Camp Sex Vampire
- Geovanni Gopradi as Finch's Detail Guy

== Episodes ==
No. overall	No. in season	Title	Directed by	Written by	Original release date	US viewers (millions)
61	1	"Who Are You, Really?"	Stephen Moyer	Raelle Tucker	June 16, 2013	4.52
Picking up right where Season 5 ended, Sookie, Eric, Jason, Jessica, Nora, Pam and Tara flee the Authority compound after Bill's reincarnation. Sam, Luna, and Emma also escape from Authority headquarters, though Luna dies from her injuries, entrusting Sam to take care of Emma. Meanwhile, Louisiana Governor Truman Burrell declares war on vampires, but also secretly partners with a Japanese rep to manufacture Tru Blood. Eric says he is no longer Pam's maker, and she no longer follows his orders. Upset, Pam goes to Fangtasia with Tara, when some S.W.A.T. troopers arrive and shoot Tara, after announcing all Vampire businesses are closed. Elsewhere, the distraught Jason hitchhikes and is picked up by an old man, who he believes to be Warlow; Jason shoots at the man who disappears, while the faerie blood contract promising Sookie to Warlow starts to glow. Also, Alcide is about to have sex with a young woman in the pack to cement his new authority as alpha wolf when Rikki shows up, and they have a threesome. In Bon Temps, Andy agrees to take care of his four faerie kids with Arlene's help. However, the four infants age quickly from babies to three-year-old girls overnight. Jessica is summoned by Bill to his house, who now appears normal but more powerful. He is attacked by Eric and survives being staked from behind by Sookie. He demands they all leave, except Jessica. Eric signs Sookie's house back over to her in his blood, while she takes back her invitation, and Nora notices that Eric is in love with Sookie. Bill talks to Jessica in her bedroom to put her fears about him to rest, and after returning to his room, he sees Lilith (and three other nude and blood-covered vampire sirens like her), who appear to enter his body.
62	2	"The Sun"	Daniel Attias	Angela Robinson	June 23, 2013	4.08
Warlow manages to break through the dimensional barrier and enter Bon Temps. Jason learns that the mysterious driver who drove him back to town is in fact his fairy grandfather, Niall Brigant. Meanwhile, Tara recovers from being shot by a new high-tech anti-vampire silver UV bullet and Pam & Nora argue on what their next move should be; Pam suggests they kill the Humans before they actually began to fight back whereas Nora suggests they find Bill and kill him; Eric silences them both saying that he will take care of the humans and wants Nora to find a way stop Bill, while Bill enters a trance where Lilith warns him about the future. The next morning, Sookie is late for work and helps an injured stranger, named Ben, who is revealed to be another fairy-halfling. At the bar, Arlene is kept busy by Terry in explaining to Patrick's pregnant wife how he has left her. At the same time, a visitor and leader of a pro-vampire and shifter group, named Nicole, approaches Sam and tries to convince him to come out for the good of his kind. Jessica hires "food" (female prostitute) for an unresponsive Bill, but the encounter ends badly when the woman is drained by Bill's powers. Nora rereads the vampire bible in hopes of insights, while Eric unsuccessfully attempts to glamour Gov. Burrell who anticipated his arrival, and tells him that Vampire hunting is legal after they bombed the TruBlood factories, and proceeds to have him arrested which he escapes. Sookie meets her grandfather, who teaches her how to focus her light defensively. Later, Sam and Lafayette are attacked by Alcide and Martha who kidnap Emma after a brief fight. Jessica prays for Bill and her friends, and Bill realizes that he has the ability to see the future.
63	3	"You're No Good"	Howard Deutch	Mark Hudis	June 30, 2013	3.94
An irate Eric takes matters into his own hands by glamouring and then kidnapping the Governor's daughter, Willa. She reveals her father's secret detention and research camp, where vampires are experimented on - a camp where Steve Newlin now finds himself detained and confronted by his ex-wife Sarah, who is now Governor Burrell's henchwoman. Nora is captured by the Governor's soldiers and also taken to the vampire detention camp. Sookie learns that she is Fae royalty. Meanwhile, Warlow begins stalking Sookie's house and raids the secret fairy club. Elsewhere, Sam and Lafayette are helped by Nicole and her Vampire Unity Society (V.U.S.) friends. Bill, assured of his new powers, attempts to day-walk but is severely burnt. Andy attempts to renew a relationship with Holly. Jessica kidnaps the creator of TruBlood, Hido Takahashi, and Bill schemes to synthesize a new type of drink – based on Sookie's fairy blood. Also, Sam rescues Emma, but things go badly for the VUS activists. Sookie and Ben realize they share a connection.
64	4	"At Last"	Anthony Hemingway	Alexander Woo	July 7, 2013	4.14
Jason is injured and Ben (revealed as part-vampire) secretly feeds him his blood - a secret Sookie soon learns. Sam, Emma, and injured Nicole are helped to escape Alcide's werewolf pack by Lafayette. Gov. Burrell and his vampire SWAT team raid Ginger's house but Eric, Pam, Tara, and Willow are long gone. Meanwhile, Andy's daughters are aging unusually quickly into teenagers, and leave the house to party but are intercepted by Bill and Jessica. Bill gives Takahashi the task of synthesizing a new kind of blood by using samples of the fairy-hybrid blood from the teens. Also, Eric turns a willing Willa into his second ever baby-vampire. Sookie attempts to trap Ben by inviting him to dinner, while Jason and Niall realize Ben is a fairy-vampire hybrid too, and unsuccessfully try to raid his motel room which results in Jason being glamored to forget the incident and Niall is drained of blood and sent back to the fairy world. Willa goes home and attempts to influence her father, until she is shot by Sarah Newlin. Jessica loses control and kills three of the four fairy quadruplets.
65	5	"Fuck the Pain Away"	Michael Ruscio	Angela Robinson	July 14, 2013	4.54
Sookie's plan to entrap Warlow/Ben fails when Bill arrives and reveals himself as Warlow's maker (through Lilith's blood memories). Andy arrives at Bill's house and find one of his daughters alive. Meanwhile, Sarah is kicked out of the governor’s Home for her actions and for how little she thinks of Willa after being turned, and turns her attentions to Jason. Pam is shot and taken to the research camp, and Eric and Tara allow themselves to be captured to be taken there too. Jessica despairs of her actions, and is confronted by Sarah at Jason's house where Jessica is captured and taken to the vampire research facility. Meanwhile, Terry asks an old marine corp friend to kill him, and Andy resigns himself to not taking revenge on Bill and Jessica. Also, Warlow has flashbacks to his making in 3500 BC. Sookie gets Lafayette to summon her dead parents to learn whether they had planned to kill her, but things take a turn for the worse when a possessed Lafayette tries to kill her. In the camp, Pam is psychoanalyzed, and later she is told to duel Eric to the true death.
66	6	"Don't You Feel Me"	Howard Deutch	Daniel Kenneth	July 21, 2013	4.47
Bill releases Warlow to save Sookie, and Eric's duel with Pam doesn't end as expected. Sookie then takes Warlow with her to a faerie-only plane to protect him from Bill and to question Warlow more about his intentions for her. Back in the real world, Sam, Nicole, and Emma hide out at a motel but their presence is detected by Alcide's father, Jackson. Bill glamours Takahashi into draining him in order to travel to another plane and seeks Lilith's advice on the escalating human–vampire crisis. Meanwhile, Jason tries to help Jessica by becoming a camp guard, but he is soon spotted by Sarah who decides to put Jason's loyalties to a test. Andy names his remaining faerie daughter, who becomes Adilyn Bellefleur. At the camp lab, Nora is infected with "hepatitis V" and Eric is forced to watch her suffer. Arlene and Holly hire a vampire to glamour Terry into forgetting his past, but he is shot and killed the next day by his former marine friend as planned. Elsewhere, Sam returns Emma to Martha, and he is told by Alcide to leave town forever. Bill daywalks after drinking Warlow's blood and kills Governor Burrell and his guards at his mansion. Eric plans an escape from the camp with a little of Willa's help, and discovers a TruBlood production facility making contaminated drinks tainted with the hepatitis V virus. Also, Sookie's "danger whore" instincts take over as she and Warlow have sex.
67	7	"In the Evening"	Scott Winant	Kate Barnow	July 28, 2013	4.36
Eric escapes the facility with the ailing Nora where they hide out at Bill's mansion, but Eric is soon angered when Bill refuses to heal her against her will. Meanwhile, Warlow wants to get married, but Sookie isn't so sure. Sarah finds Burrell's corpse, and resolving that it was the will of God, schemes with a Senator to cover up the death as well as take over command of the late Governor's anti-vampire policy and detention camp. Sookie leaves Warlow to comfort Arlene and help her tell her children what happened to Terry. Sookie then travels with Lafayette to the bank and opens Terry's safety deposit box where they discover a $2 million life insurance policy and finally realize that Terry planned his death. At the detention camp, Jason meets Jessica and arranges for her to meet James, a vampire detainee to personally thank for not raping her. Bill daywalks and visits the Bellefleur house, seeking Sookie and asking her for the assistance of Warlow to stop his premonitions. Sam calls Nicole's mother to take her back to California. Alcide has a talk with Jackson over where Alcide stands with leading a wolf pack life. Also, Eric has a flashback to 1665 London where he first met and saved Nora from the plague, whereas in the present he fails to save her as she dies in his arms.
68	8	"Dead Meat"	Michael Lehmann	Robin Veith	August 4, 2013	4.17
Eric and Bill have a major fallout over Nora's death, as Eric believes Bill could’ve saved her but chose not to. Alcide and Rikki have a fallout over his lying about killing Sam or Nicole. Sookie returns to the faerie plane and asks Warlow to help her, but he is reluctant to do so without her promise of marriage. At the detention camp, Jason is thrown by the evil Sarah into the female vamp population where he becomes the "property" of a detainee named Violet who is an alpha female vampire in exchange for protection, while Jessica and James hit it off. Meanwhile, Sam and Alcide reconcile after Alcide realizes his pack-leader days are over with his ousting, and Sam detects that Nicole is pregnant. Also, everyone in the vamp-camp begins to drink the Tru Blood tainted with hep. V. Reverend Newlin tells Sarah that he knows about the tainted hep. V blood, and she is forced to kill the company's spokeswoman in a most brutal way. Sookie tries to reconnect with Sam, then visits and curses her dead parents. Sarah locks up all the vampires who refuse to drink it in the white room, in accordance with Bill's vision. Sookie reconciles herself to her vampire-fairy hybrid fate, just as Eric uses Adilyn's blood to pass through and attack Warlow in his fae sanctuary.
69	9	"Life Matters"	Romeo Tirone	Brian Buckner	August 11, 2013	4.00
Sookie and Bill clash over Bill's desire to use Warlow's blood, and she heals him using her blood. Newly empowered to daywalk, Eric arrives at Vamp Camp, killing all of its perimeter guards, and releasing its male and female captives thereby starting a successful riot. Meanwhile, Terry's funeral begins, and Terry's early battles with PTSD and his inner demons are shown in a series of eulogies and flashbacks. Sarah Newlin escapes; however, she opens the roof of the white room in order to burn the trapped vampires inside. Bill arrives to prevent this, offering himself so they are immune to the sunlight. Eric intervenes when Steve Newlin tries to get his share, forcing Newlin into the sun and to his death. Bill, weakened by his blood loss, is visited by Lilith's three sirens before being rescued by Jessica and James. The saved vampires, now all high on fae-blood and with the ability to daywalk, start destroying the infected TruBlood bottles, and Jason decides not to kill Sarah Newlin, letting her escape.
70	10	"Radioactive"	Scott Winant	Kate Barnow	August 18, 2013	4.14
In the finale, Bill discovers that salvation comes at a price as he loses his powers inherited from the blood of Lilith. Sookie tries to talk Warlow into dating her first, but he turns violent. Bill finally releases Takahashi, and Jessica encourages him to save Sookie. With the help of Jason, Violet, Andy and Adylin, they rescue her. Warlow follows them and just as he is ready to recapture Sookie, Niall reappears and helps Jason stake Warlow. As soon as Warlow dies, the inherited power of daywalking diminishes. Far away in Sweden, Eric also loses the power, which causes him to burst into flames. Six months later, things return to normal in Bon Temps: Bill has become an author, Sam is the new mayor, Arlene has taken over Sam's bar, and Sookie and Alcide are in a relationship again, as are Jason and Violet. However, the hepatitis V virus has spread around the country and infected vampires begin to run amok. At a church meeting, Sam and Bill suggest that each citizen pair with a healthy vampire as protection. Tara's estranged mother, Lettie Mae, offers herself to "nourish" Tara in a reconciliation attempt. Meanwhile, Jessica asks for forgiveness from Andy and Adylin and promises to protect them. In the final scene, during the "pairing" meet at Bellefleur's, a horde of infected vampires gather and close in on the party.

== Production ==
In February 2012 series creator Alan Ball announced he would step down as day-to-day showrunner of True Blood but would stay on as executive producer. Mark Hudis, who joined the writing staff at the beginning of the fourth season, was chosen as executive producer for season six. However, the producers announced in March 2013 that, after only a single season, Hudis would also depart the series to focus on developing his own HBO series. Brian Buckner filled the position for the rest of the season and will continue in the role for the seventh season. On Monday, July 15, 2013, HBO renewed True Blood for a seventh and final season.

== Ratings ==
Episode number (Production number)	Title	Original air date	Ratings share (Adults 18–49)	Viewers (in millions)	Rank per week on Cable
61 (6.01)	"Who Are You, Really?"	June 16, 2013	2.4	4.52	#4
62 (6.02)	"The Sun"	June 23, 2013	2.2	4.08	#9
63 (6.03)	"You're No Good"	June 30, 2013	2.2	3.93	#9
64 (6.04)	"At Last"	July 7, 2013	2.3	4.14	#5
65 (6.05)	"Fuck the Pain Away"	July 14, 2013	2.5	4.54	#5
66 (6.06)	"Don't You Feel Me"	July 21, 2013	2.4	4.47	#8
67 (6.07)	"In the Evening"	July 28, 2013	2.4	4.36	#4
68 (6.08)	"Dead Meat"	August 4, 2013	2.2	4.17	#7
69 (6.09)	"Life Matters"	August 11, 2013	2.2	4.00	#11
70 (6.10)	"Radioactive"	August 18, 2013	2.3	4.14	#12
