= True Blood season 1 =

True Blood
- Season 1
- DVD cover art
- No. of episodes: 12

Release
- Original network: HBO
- Original release: September 7 – November 23, 2008

Season chronology
- Next → Season 2

The first season of the American television drama series True Blood premiered on September 7, 2008 and concluded on November 23, 2008. It consists of 12 episodes, each running approximately 55 minutes in length and was, for the most part, based on the novel Dead Until Dark, the first entry in The Southern Vampire Mysteries by Charlaine Harris. The story takes place in the fictional town of Bon Temps, Louisiana, two years after vampires have made their presence known to mankind, and follows telepathic waitress Sookie Stackhouse as she attempts to solve a series of murders that seem to be motivated by a hatred of vampires.

HBO broadcast the first season on Sunday nights at 9:00 pm in the United States, with a repeat showing at 11:00 pm. The complete first season was released on DVD and Blu-ray on May 19, 2009.

== Storyline ==
Sookie Stackhouse (Anna Paquin) is a waitress with telepathic abilities. Stephen Moyer plays her love interest, vampire Bill Compton. Sookie works for Sam Merlotte (Sam Trammell), owner of Merlotte's bar and a shapeshifter who has a crush on Sookie. Sookie's best friend Tara Thornton (Rutina Wesley) begins bartending at Merlotte's after quitting her job at the Super Save-A-Bunch. Also working at Merlotte's are Tara's cousin Lafayette Reynolds (Nelsan Ellis), a short order cook and hustler, and Arlene Fowler (Carrie Preston). Arlene is a thrice-divorced waitress with two children who, over the course of the season, becomes engaged to Rene Lenier (Michael Raymond-James), a Cajun labourer who works on a road crew.

Jason Stackhouse (Ryan Kwanten), Sookie's brother, is a labourer on a road crew and ladies' man. Jason's sexual relations begin to die, one after the other, and he is suspected of being a serial killer. Hoyt Fortenberry (Jim Parrack), Jason's co-worker, admires Jason's abilities with women. Adele Stackhouse (Lois Smith) is Jason and Sookie's grandmother who has looked after them since the deaths of their parents. Jason's love interest Amy Burley (Lizzy Caplan) begins a relationship with Jason because of a shared addiction to vampire blood, or "V". They kidnap Eddie Gauthier (Stephen Root), to use his blood.

In the vampire community, Eric Northman (Alexander Skarsgård) is the Sheriff of Area 5, which includes Bon Temps, and owner of the vampire bar Fangtasia. Working for Eric, both in the bar and under him as Sheriff, are Pam (Kristin Bauer) and Chow (Patrick Gallagher). The bartender Longshadow (Raoul Trujillo) is killed by Bill to protect Sookie. As punishment for killing a fellow vampire and to replenish the vampire ranks, Bill is taken to the Magister (Željko Ivanek) and forced to sire Jessica Hamby (Deborah Ann Woll). Jessica is cared for by Eric but when he grows tired of her he leaves her with Bill.

In the middle of the season Tara's mother, Lettie Mae (Adina Porter), undergoes an exorcism to rid herself of what she terms her "demons" - her addiction to alcohol. The exorcism is administered by "Miss Jeanette", an alias of Nancy LeGuare (Aisha Hinds). Following her exorcism Lettie Mae kicks Tara out. Following a crash and DUI, Tara is taken in by Maryann Forrester (Michelle Forbes), who initially presents herself to Tara as some kind of social worker. While staying with Maryann, Tara meets "Eggs" Benedict Talley (Mehcad Brooks) to whom she feels a strong attraction.

The central mystery of the season begins when Maudette Pickens (Danielle Sapia) is killed. Sheriff Dearborne (William Sanderson) places his only detective, Andy Bellefleur (Chris Bauer) in charge of finding the killer. Bellefleur suspects Jason Stackhouse, and that suspicion grows after the murder of Dawn Green (Lynn Collins). Andy's cousin Terry (Todd Lowe) works as a cook at Merlotte's.

The international conflict between vampires and humans is played out in the background, but two minor characters are introduced who become major characters in the second season: Reverend Steve Newlin (Michael McMillian) and his wife Sarah (Anna Camp). They head the anti-vampire church the Fellowship of the Sun following the death of Steve's father, who was supposedly killed by vampires. A representative of the Fellowship of the Sun approaches Jason Stackhouse while he is in jail in the final episode of the season.

== Episodes ==
No. overall	No. in season	Title	Directed by	Written by	Original release date	US viewers (millions)
1	1	"Strange Love"	Alan Ball	Alan Ball	September 7, 2008	1.44
In the two years following the invention of the synthetic plasma TruBlood, vampires have made their presence known to mankind. In the small town of Bon Temps, Louisiana, 25-year-old waitress Sookie Stackhouse struggles with being telepathic, unable to control hearing others thoughts. She soon meets 173-year-old vampire Bill Compton at Merlotte's bar where she works, becoming drawn to him. Mack and Denise Rattray, a pair of local thugs attack Bill with silver, attempting to drain his blood to sell on the black market. But Sookie rescues Bill, driving the Rattrays away. She learns Bill's interested in her, and that she cannot read his thoughts as his brain is technically dead. Meanwhile, Sookie's best friend Tara Thornton is hired by Sam Merlotte as a bartender after losing her job while Sookie's brother Jason has a fling with Maudette Pickens, who shows Jason a sex tape of her with a bald-headed, tattooed vampire. The next day, Jason is arrested by Sheriff Bud Dearborne and Detective Andy Bellefleur for Maudette's murder. Sookie's grandmother Adele asks if Sookie thinks she can get Bill to speak at her Descendants of the Glorious Dead meeting. When Bill agrees to meet with Sookie, Sam and Tara are apprehensive about them being involved. After work, Sookie is attacked in a parking lot by the vengeful Rattrays.
2	2	"The First Taste"	Scott Winant	Alan Ball	September 14, 2008	1.79
Bill comes to Sookie's rescue, killing the Rattrays and takes Sookie to a lake, healing her with his blood. Sookie asks Bill about being a guest speaker at her grandmother's next meeting, and Bill agrees, asking if he can visit her house to meet her family. Meanwhile, Jason is shown a tape of him with Maudette, with Jason thinking he choked her to death during sex, when it turns out she was only fooling around with him. Dearborne and Bellefleur release Jason, but are still suspicious of him. Tara returns home to find her alcoholic mother passed out on the couch, and she asks her flamboyant cousin Lafayette, a cook at Merlotte's, to take her to a party. Jason meets up with an old flame and Merlotte's waitress, Dawn. The two sleep together. Jason discovers vampire bite marks on Dawn's neck the next morning. Sookie learns the Rattrays' bodies were found in their wrecked trailer, covered up as being killed by a tornado. Sookie also notices her sense of smell and taste have been enhanced by Bill's blood. That night Bill meets with Adele, Jason and Tara at Sookie's house, before taking Sookie on starlit walk and sharing a kiss. The next day Dawn heads for work, leaving Jason tied up on her bed. At Merlotte's, Sookie learns that Reverend Theodore Newlin, founder of the anti-vampire church the Fellowship of the Sun, along with his wife and daughter, were killed in an accident. Sookie heads to Bill's house to question him, and is set upon by three vampires, Malcolm, Diane, and Liam the bald vampire in Maudette's sex tape.
3	3	"Mine"	John Dahl	Alan Ball	September 21, 2008	1.81
To rescue Sookie from the other three vampires, Bill claims Sookie is his human. Malcolm offers to let Bill feed on Jerry, a young man they feed from. Sookie reads Jerry's mind, learning that he has Hepatitis D, which infects only vampires. Jerry sought to avenge his boyfriend, who was lost to vampire blood addiction, and attacks Sookie, but Bill knocks him unconscious. Diane questions how Sookie knew this, but Bill makes them leave. Sookie is left shaken and questioning her relationship with Bill. At Merlotte's, Sam and Tara close up for the night and discuss their loneliness, agreeing to a one night stand. Jason becomes put off by Dawn having sex with vampires. After an argument, Dawn kicks Jason out of her house, which is witnessed by Dawn's neighbor. Bill tells the other vampires to leave Sookie alone. They criticize him for "mainstreaming", suggesting that vampire's revealing themselves was a bad idea. Tara leaves home after an argument with her mother, and goes to stay with Lafayette. After a discussion with Adele, Sookie decides to give Bill another chance. Jason goes to Lafayette's to get some Viagra and is given a vial of vampire blood, instructed to take one or two drops of blood at a time. In return, Jason must dance on camera for Lafayette's website, with Tara getting a view of Jason's performance. When Dawn doesn't show up for work, Sookie visits her house and finds Dawn's remains in her bed.
4	4	"Escape from Dragon House"	Michael Lehmann	Brian Buckner	September 28, 2008	1.82
Upon Sookie's discovery of Dawn, Jason shows up with a bouquet of flowers, as Sookie screams for help. Dawn's neighbor, upon seeing her body, accuses Jason of killing her. A crowd of police and onlookers gather, including Arlene Fowler, another Merlotte's waitress, her boyfriend Rene Lenier, and Hoyt Fortenberry, who both work with Jason's roadworks crew. Sam, who owns the block of houses, shows up to comfort Sookie. Bellefleur takes Jason in for questioning, and Jason remembers that he possesses a vial of illegal vampire blood and swallows the whole thing. The overdose gives Jason a severe case of priapism. Jason is taken home by Tara, who insists on taking him to the hospital to treat his erection. Adele has Sookie read the townspeople's minds to find evidence to clear Jason, and Bill agrees to take her to "Fangtasia" a vampire bar in Shreveport. They encounter Bill's acquaintance, Pam and the bar's owner, Eric Northman, a thousand-year-old Viking vampire. Eric admits he slept with Dawn, but not Maudette. After Jason is treated, Tara reminisces about their childhood, when Jason would protect her from her mother's abuse. At Fangtasia, Sookie senses a human is being fed on in the bathroom, before a police chase ensues. Sookie, Bill, Pam and Eric escape just in time. On their way home, Bill is pulled over by a police officer, who Bill glamours into leaving them alone. Sam visits Dawn's and rolls around in her sheets, sniffing and writhing.
5	5	"Sparks Fly Out"	Daniel Minahan	Alexander Woo	October 5, 2008	1.74
Bill visits Sookie, and the two have an argument about their encounter with the police officer. Bill confesses that had Sookie not been there, he would've killed the officer. Sookie asks Adele about her problem, and Adele suggests that she not be afraid or suspicious of him just because he is different. Tara is furious at Lafayette for selling V-juice to Jason, but Lafayette convinces Jason to give it another try, instructing him on how to take it properly. At Merlotte's, Sam asks Sookie to go with him to the Descendents of the Glorious Dead meeting. Sookie becomes suspicious about Tara and Jason, learning that Tara lied to the police for Jason's alibi. At the meeting, a crowd gathers at the church for Bill's speech. Bill recounts the loss of his friend Tolliver Humphries during the Civil War, and becomes emotional when the Mayor presents Bill with a photograph of his former wife and children. After the meeting, Sookie and Sam share coffee, and Sam insists that Bill is dangerous, regardless of Sookie's feelings. Jason, Rene and Hoyt dine together, where Jason (high on vampire blood) professes his love for Tara, who waits until he is sober for the conversation. Bill is visited by Sheriff Dearborne and Andy, who question him about the murders. Bill claims vampires can't resist a body full of human blood; the victims were not exsanguinated, so the killer couldn't be a vampire. After they leave, Bill remembers how he was turned by a vampire named Lorena, who separated him from his family. Tara becomes angry when she catches Jason having sex with another girl. Sookie returns home, finding her grandmother dead in a pool of her own blood.
6	6	"Cold Ground"	Nick Gomez	Raelle Tucker	October 12, 2008	1.67
Sam and Bill watch over Sookie, who refuses to leave the house she and her grandmother shared. As coroner Mike Spencer has Adele's body removed, Sookie scrubs up Adele's blood. Andy and Bud discuss the case; Andy regrets releasing Jason Stackhouse, Bud doubts Jason could murder his own grandmother. The next day, Sookie holds a wake for Adele in the house, which is full of nosy townspeople. Sookie loses it when Maxine Fortenberry attempts to make room in the fridge by moving the last pie Adele made before she was killed. Tara and Lafayette take Sookie upstairs and Sookie confesses that she doesn't think she is feeling anything at all. Jason, oblivious to his grandmother's death, learns the news at work, and races to the wake. Jason smacks Sookie, blaming her for the death, but is forced out by Tara. Andy confronts Jason, practically accusing him of murdering Adele, and Jason shoves Andy down as though he weighed nothing. At Adele's funeral, Jason invites their estranged uncle Bartlett, aggravating Sookie; Lettie Mae makes a speech about a woman she barely knew; Jason struggles with his V-juice addiction and Sookie lashes out when she cannot block out the townspeople's thoughts. After the funeral, Lettie Mae tells Tara that she's possessed by a demon, forcing her to drink and needs money for an exorcism; after sleeping with Sam, Tara becomes conflicted about her mother's problem. Sookie returns home, eating her grandmother's last pie, sobbing over every bite. Sookie goes to Bill's house, where he takes her virginity and she tells him to drink her blood.
7	7	"Burning House of Love"	Marcos Siega	Chris Offutt	October 19, 2008	2.10
After sleeping together, Bill and Sookie soak in a warm bath. She feels comfortable enough to reveal a very dark secret. After sleeping with Bill, Sookie becomes comfortable with him to reveal she was molested by her uncle Bartlett. Unbeknownst to Sookie, Bill plans to kill Bartlett as revenge. Meanwhile, Jason desperately tries to score more V from Lafayette, going as far as to take some of Adele's old silver to sell, before Sookie stops him. Jason visits Fangtasia, foolishly attempting to buy from the vampire bartender, Longshadow. A young woman named Amy pretends to be Jason's girlfriend, getting out of trouble with a promise of V. After her mother makes a scene at the bank, Tara agrees to pay for Lettie Mae's treatment. They visit Miss Jeanette, a witch doctor, who "exorcizes" Lettie Mae, but tells Tara that she has a worse demon than her mother's, but is dismissed. At Merlotte's, Sam and Arlene are very critical of Sookie's decision to sleep with Bill and let him feed, and she tells them to mind their business. Meanwhile, Bill visits and kills uncle Bartlett, dumping his body in the river. Merlotte's is crashed by Malcolm, Diane and Liam who menace the patrons before Bill shows up in time to stop them. Bill agrees goes with them and stops messing around with humans, leaving Sookie heartbroken. Jason takes Amy home, and the two do V. Chuck, Wayne and Royce, furious at the trio of vampires, plot to kill them. Sookie tries to get Sam to intervene, but he refuses to get involved. The next morning, the three rednecks set fire to the vampire trio's safehouse. Sookie races to the vampire trio's house, finding rescue workers pulling four burnt coffins out of the charred remains.
8	8	"The Fourth Man in the Fire"	Michael Lehmann	Alexander Woo	October 26, 2008	2.07
Sookie thinks Bill was killed in the fire, while Jason wakes up with Amy, thinking they had sex, but it turns out that they were simply V-tripping. Jason opens up to her about his parents' tragic deaths. Tara is amazed at Lettie Mae's seemingly instantaneous recovery and fights with Sookie about Bill. That night, Sookie takes flowers to Bill's grave. As she is walking back, she is attacked by Bill and they have sex. The next day, Jason introduces Amy to Merlotte's and she is hired as a new waitress, but Sookie tries to warn her about Jason. Tara lashes out at her mother's [born-again] Christianity and, after sleeping with Sam again, snaps at him. Sookie and Bill babysit Arlene's kids and Rene proposes to Arlene, who accepts. Mike Spencer, the coroner, identifies the fourth body in the fire as Neil, his assistant who was secretly a "fang banger". Sam is interrogated by Bud and Andy. Sam claims that he comes from a family of naturists and runs naked through the woods once a year to honor them. But Andy checks and finds out Sam was lying. After talking with Lafayette, Tara starts thinking that she may need an exorcism. Jason sees Amy's darker side when she reveals that she needs more V, but Lafayette won't sell it to him. They decide to follow him and discover that he gets his V-juice from a gay vampire, Eddie. Bill finds Eric in his bathtub who needs Sookie to work for him. Tara goes to Miss Jeanette to get her exorcism. After Lafayette leaves, Jason and Amy kidnap Eddie and shove him into Jason's truck. Sookie reluctantly goes to Fangtasia, where Eric uses her telepathy to find who has embezzled. Sookie learns that a woman named Ginger knows the money was taken, but her memory has been wiped, which means a vampire must have stolen it. At that moment, Longshadow attacks her.
9	9	"Plaisir d'Amour"	Anthony M. Hemingway	Brian Buckner	November 2, 2008	2.35
Bill kills Longshadow, saving Sookie, and Eric warns Bill that there will be consequences. A distressed Jason and Amy take the kidnapped vampire, Eddie to his house, using his blood to get high. Tara is unconvinced that of her demon, and Miss Jeanette gives her a test: to look in the mirror and count backwards to ten, she's wrong. When Tara attempts so, she's interrupted by her mother. Sookie and Bill return home, finding her cat slaughtered. At Merlotte's, Sookie snaps at Andy for not finding the killer, and starts to bond with Amy. Meanwhile, Jason talks to Eddie, discussing his human life. Eric and Pam summon Bill to vampire tribunal for killing Longshadow. At Merlotte's, Bill asks Sam to watch over Sookie in his absence, while Eric warns the patrons about becoming too comfortable around vampires. With tearful goodbye, Bill and Sookie part ways. Sookie and Tara briefly reconcile, but Sookie soon finds Sam and Tara making out. When Andy confronts Sam for lying, about the naturist colony, Sam disappears into the bar, and a border collie runs out past Andy. Against Amy's wishes, Jason delivers TruBlood to Eddie. Sookie goes to Bill's house, finding the dog, which she decides to keep with her. Sleeping with the dog in her bed, Sookie soon awakens, finding a naked Sam in the dog's place.
10	10	"I Don't Wanna Know"	Scott Winant	Chris Offutt	November 9, 2008	2.39
Sookie panics at seeing Sam, briefly thinking he's the killer, before Sam reveals he's a shapeshifter and that there are other supernatural beings in the world. Tara visits Miss Jeanette for her exorcism, and is fed a solution making her hallucinate a young version of herself, representing her negative feelings. Tara kills the hallucination, apparently succeeding her exorcism. However, Tara soon learns that Miss Jeanette is a fraud, who gives her patients ipecac and peyote. Tara decides to keep the news from her mother. Amy discovers Jason's deception, but forgives him, suggesting they treat Eddie more like family. Sam reminisces about the first time he shapeshifted as a teenager, and how his adoptive family left him. At Merlotte's an engagement is held for Arlene and Rene with almost the whole town turning out, while Sookie feels lonely without Bill. At the party, a drunk Tara gets into a fight with Sam and leaves. On the road, Tara swerves to avoid a naked woman walking a large pig and is arrested. Sookie has a vision of a young woman being murdered, when the killer attacks her, but Sookie manages to escape his clutches. Lafayette learns Jason did something to Eddie, and lashes out at his recklessness. Jason and Amy argue about freeing Eddie, but Amy is scared of them, and stakes Eddie in front of Jason. At the vampire tribunal, the Magister punishes Bill, by having him turn a teenage girl named Jessica. Despite Bill's pleas, the sentence is handed down, and Bill feeds on Jessica.
11	11	"To Love Is to Bury"	Nancy Oliver	Nancy Oliver	November 16, 2008	2.67
After turning Jessica, Bill buries her body, waiting for her to turn. After her attack, Sookie has Sam stay with her, and the two grow close in Bill's absence. She searches for the woman she saw in her vision learning her name was Cindy; a fangbanger whose brother, Drew Marshall, disappeared shortly after her death. Jason helps Amy clean up after Eddie's death, demanding she get rid of their remaining V-juice. Jason talks to Rene and Hoyt about Amy's V-juice habit. Sam and Sookie look into Drew Marshall, persuading an officer to fax a photo through to the Bon Temps police station. On the way home, Sookie tells Sam that she thinks she loves Bill, but has doubts over his loyalties to other vampires. Amy and Jason make up over dinner, and to do V together one last time; while they're passed, the killer breaks in and strangles Amy to death. Lafayette confronts Senator Finch about campaigning against vampire and gay rights despite their affair. A fully transformed Jessica awakens, and Bill tries to impart his wisdom to her, but she turns out disobedient, and overly-excited. Lettie Mae refuses to bail out Tara. claiming she is a danger to her soul. Instead, Tara is bailed out by a woman named Maryann Forrester, taking Tara into her lavish home. Bill returns home, leaving Jessica with Eric. There, Sookie and Sam wind up sharing a kiss as Bill walks in and attacks Sam. Sookie rescinds Bill's invitation and kicks him out. Believing himself to have killed Amy, Jason turns himself in. At the station, a distracted secretary ignores the fax of Drew Marshall's photo before burying it under a pile of paperwork; the photo reveals Drew Marshall is Rene.
12	12	"You'll Be the Death of Me"	Alan Ball	Raelle Tucker	November 23, 2008	2.45
Sookie tells Jason that she believes she has found the identity of the killer, but Jason ignores herA representative of the Fellowship of the Sun named Orry visits Jason in jail, trying to convince him that even if he did kill the women, his motive was pure because they were vampire supporters. Maryann bonds with Tara, gaining her trust, and introduces her to Benedict "Eggs" Talley, a young man Maryanne is "helping". Sookie, working at Merlotte's, becomes overwhelmed with the hateful thoughts the patrons have about Jason. When she tries to leave, she is unable to start her car. Rene shows up and offers her a ride home. Sam finds Rene's vest and, smelling it, realizes a connection to Rene and the murders. At her house, Sookie discovers that Rene is Drew Marshall from reading his mind. She tries to shoot him, but Rene has emptied her gun, and chases her into a cemetery. Bill risks his life by emerging into the sun to help Sookie, but is quickly weakened and injured by the burning. Rene catches up to Sookie and overpowers her, but Sam attacks him in dog form. Sookie then decapitates Rene with a shovel. Sam and Sookie find Bill, weak and burning, and quickly bury him. Later, Sookie who believes Bill dead is comforted by her friends and by Jason, who was released and exonerated. Bill appears at Sookie's doorstep, completely healed. Two weeks later, Sookie and Bill become an item. Andy becomes depressed over his failure to solve the case, and begins drinking. While cleaning outside Merlotte's, Lafayette is attacked by an unknown entity. As the Merlotte's staff help Andy to his car, they discover a dead body on the back seat.

== Cast and characters ==
=== Main cast ===
- Anna Paquin as Sookie Stackhouse
- Stephen Moyer as Bill Compton
- Sam Trammell as Sam Merlotte
- Ryan Kwanten as Jason Stackhouse
- Rutina Wesley as Tara Thornton
- Chris Bauer as Detective Andy Bellefleur
- Nelsan Ellis as Lafayette Reynolds
- Jim Parrack as Hoyt Fortenberry
- Adina Porter as Lettie Mae Thornton
- Carrie Preston as Arlene Fowler
- Michael Raymond-James as Rene Lenier
- William Sanderson as Sheriff Bud Dearborne
- Alexander Skarsgård as Eric Northman
- Lynn Collins as Dawn Green
- Lizzy Caplan as Amy Burley
- Lois Smith as Adele Stackhouse
- Stephen Root as Eddie Gauthier

=== Guest cast ===
- Todd Lowe as Terry Bellefleur
- Kristin Bauer van Straten as Pamela Swynford De Beaufort
- John Billingsley as Mike Spencer
- Alec Gray as Coby Fowler
- Aisha Hinds as Miss Jeanette
- Dale Raoul as Maxine Fortenberry
- Graham Shiels as Liam
- Raoul Trujillo as Longshadow
- Laurel Weber as Lisa Fowler
- Jeremy Denzlinger as Wayne
- Aunjanue Ellis as Diane
- Kanin Howell as Chuck
- Michelle Forbes as Maryann Forrester
- Danielle James as Randi Sue
- Michael McMillian as Reverend Steve Newlin
- Caleb Moody as Royce Williams
- John Prosky as David Finch
- Stacie Rippy as Cindy Marshall
- Andrew Rothenberg as Malcolm
- Danielle Sapia as Maudette Pickens
- Jessica Tuck as Nan Flanagan
- Deborah Ann Woll as Jessica Hamby
- Avion Baker as Young Tara
- Tara Buck as Ginger
- Patrick Gallagher as Chow
- Labon K. Hester as Young Jason
- Karina Logue as Denise Rattray
- Melanie MacQueen as Faye Lebvre
- Kevin McHale as Neil Jones
- Tess Alexandra Parker as Rosie
- James Jean Parks as Mack Rattray
- John Rezig as Deputy Kevin Ellis
- William Schallert as Sterling Norris
- Zenali Turner as Young Sookie
- Cheyenne Wilbur as Bartlett Hale
- Patricia Bethune as Jane Bodehouse
- Michael Bofshever as Orry Dawson
- Mehcad Brooks as "Eggs" Benedict Talley
- Željko Ivanek as Magnus the Magister
- Mariana Klaveno as Lorena Krasiki
- Adam Leadbeater as Karl
- Judy Prescott as Sue Ann Merlotte
- Stewart Skelton as Minister
- Martin Spanjers as Young Sam
- Sharon Tay as Sharon
- Tanya Wright as Deputy Kenya Jones

== Production ==
=== Crew ===
Series creator Alan Ball had previously worked with premium cable channel HBO on Six Feet Under, which ran five seasons. In October 2005, after Six Feet Under's finale, Ball signed a two-year agreement with HBO to develop and produce original programming for the network. True Blood became the first project under the deal, after Ball became acquainted with Charlaine Harris' Southern Vampire Mystery books. One day, while early for a dentist appointment, Ball was browsing through Barnes & Noble and came across Dead Until Dark, the first installment in Harris' series. Enjoying it, he read the following entries and became interested in "bringing Harris' vision to television". However, Harris had two other adaptation options for the books when Ball approached her. He said she chose to work with him, though, because "[Ball] really 'got' me. That's how he convinced me to go with him. I just felt that he understood what I was doing with the books."

Ball wrote and directed the pilot episode, double Emmy winner Scott Winant, Red Rock West writer/director John Dahl, Heathers director Michael Lehmann, former Deadwood director Daniel Minahan, The Sopranos director Nick Gomez, Pretty Persuasion director Marcos Siega, The Wire director Anthony Hemingway and Six Feet Under co-producer Nancy Oliver directed subsequent episodes, with Ball directing the finale.

Nancy Oliver joined Ball as a producer, in the same role she had on Six Feet Under. Ball wrote the first three episodes with Brian Buckner, Alexander Woo, Raelle Tucker and Chris Offutt writing two episodes a piece, Nancy Oliver wrote and directed the eleventh episode, which marked her debut as a director.

Buckner, Tucker and Woo were also credited as producers, Offutt was executive story editor for this season. Christina Jokanovich was an associate producer and Carol Dunn Trussell the line producer.

== Reception ==
The first season of True Blood debuted at a very modest 1.44 million viewers compared to the network's past drama premiers such as Big Love which premiered at 4.56 million, and John from Cincinnati which debuted at 3.4 million. However, by late November 2008, 6.8 million a week were watching; this figure includes repeat and on-demand viewings. The season finale's viewership was 2.4 million. At the time, True Blood had reportedly become HBO's most popular series since The Sopranos and Sex and the City.

== Awards and nominations ==
The series won the Primetime Emmy Award for Outstanding Casting for a Drama Series. Anna Paquin won the Golden Globe Award for Best Actress in a Television series - Drama whilst the show was nominated for Best TV series - Drama. It also won best TV show, best horror actor for Stephen Moyer, Best Horror Actress for Anna Paquin & best villain for Alexander Skarsgård at the Scream Awards

== Ratings ==
=== United Kingdom ===
All ratings are taken from the UK Ratings website, BARB.

Episode number (Production number)	Title	Original air date	Total viewers on Channel 4	Rank on channel
1 (1.01)	Strange Love	October 7, 2009	1.91 million	#13
2 (1.02)	The First Taste	October 14, 2009	1.84 million	#14
3 (1.03)	Mine	October 21, 2009	1.67 million	#27

== Season 1 ending credits songs ==
Songs from the Season 1 ending credits in order by episode number.

1. Little Big Town – "Bones"
2. Vallejo – "Snake in the Grass"
3. Charlie Robison – "Good Times"
4. Lynyrd Skynyrd – "That Smell"
5. Nathan Barr – "The Cabin"
6. Mark Seliger's Rusty Truck – "Cold Ground"
7. Cobra Verde – "Play with Fire"
8. Eagles of Death Metal – "I Want You So Hard"
9. Rufus Thomas – "Walking the Dog"
10. Dr. John – "I Don't Wanna Know about Evil"
11. Gillian Welch – "Pass You By"
12. Crooked Still – "Ain't No Grave"
