= Strange Love (True Blood) =

- True Blood episode
- Sookie Stackhouse and Bill Compton
- Episode no.: Season 1 Episode 1
- Directed by: Alan Ball
- Written by: Alan Ball
- Original air date: September 7, 2008

Guest appearances
- Jessica Stroup as Sorority Girl; Danielle Sapia as Maudette Pickens; James Parks as Mack Rattray; Karina Logue as Denise Rattray

Episode chronology
← Previous —	Next → "The First Taste"
- True Blood (season 1)

"Strange Love" is the pilot episode of True Blood. The episode was written and directed by Alan Ball and originally aired in the United States on HBO on September 7, 2008. In the episode, Sookie Stackhouse meets vampire Bill Compton and saves him from vicious vampire drainers, while her best friend Tara becomes the new bartender at Sam Merlotte's bar and Sookie's brother Jason finds himself accused of murder. The episode received generally positive reviews from critics. It was rated TV-MA for Adult Content, Adult Language, Nudity, Strong Sexual Content, and Violence.

== Plot ==
Sookie Stackhouse (Anna Paquin), is a blonde, telepathic waitress working at Merlotte's bar in the fictional town of Bon Temps, Louisiana when Bill Compton (Stephen Moyer), a 173-year-old vampire, enters the bar. Sookie is excited, as he is the first vampire the bar has had since vampires "came out of the coffin" two years ago. Her boss, Sam Merlotte (Sam Trammell), and best friend Tara Thornton (Rutina Wesley), are apprehensive about Bill's arrival. Meanwhile, Jason Stackhouse (Ryan Kwanten) learns his sexual partner Maudette Pickens has sex with vampires and allows them to feed on her for money. He engages in rough sex with Maudette, but things take a shocking turn when he begins to choke her. When her body falls limp he panics and flees the scene, unaware the encounter was caught on camera.

Back at the bar, the Rattrays, a couple addicted to vampire blood, conspire to trap Bill and drain his blood to sell on the black market. Sookie overhears their plan and tries to convince Sam and Tara to intervene, but they are reluctant to get involved. When Sookie notices Bill and the Rattrays have left, she follows them to find Bill pinned with silver while the Rattrays draw his blood. Sookie successfully drives the couple away and frees Bill. She finds that she cannot hear Bill's thoughts, making him the first person immune to her talent.

The next day Jason visits Sookie and Gran (Lois Smith) at home. They all learn that Maudette has been murdered, and Jason quickly blames vampires. Jason's suspicious behavior prompts Sookie to try to read his mind, but he angrily rebuffs her and rushes off to work. There, Sheriff Dearborn and Detective Andy Bellefleur take Jason in for questioning.

Sookie learns that Jason has been arrested when she comes to work. She quickly forgets about his situation when Bill returns to the bar. Ignoring the scandalized patrons, Bill and Sookie arrange to meet after the bar closes at 1:30 am. Once he leaves, Sam and Tara scold Sookie for getting involved with a vampire. Rebuffing their concerns, Sookie waits in the empty parking lot where she is brutally attacked by the Rattrays.

== Title reference ==
"Strange Love" is the name of a song by Slim Harpo, which plays during the scene where Sookie is talking to Tara while she drinks a margarita. The title "Strange Love" also refers to the nature of the sex between Jason and Maudette.

== Cast ==
Bill Maher and P. J. O'Rourke cameo as themselves on a television program discussing the tension between humans and vampires. Jessica Stroup was also cast in the pilot playing a sorority girl named Kelly, she did not return into the show as she chose to star in the spin-off of 90210 playing Erin Silver.

== Production ==
After bringing his critically acclaimed funeral home drama Six Feet Under to a close in 2005, Ball signed a two-year development deal with HBO. As part of the deal, Ball obtained the rights to The Southern Vampire Mysteries, a series of romantic mystery novels by Charlaine Harris. Ball said of the books, "Charlaine has created such a rich environment that's very funny and at the same time very scary. I bought the book on impulse and I just couldn't put it down." Carolyn Strauss, who was an executive at HBO at the time, said "Alan really fell in love with the books. At its heart, the books are a metaphor for differences and outsiders fitting in. That's Alan's bailiwick and what he writes so well about."

After completing filming on his feature directorial debut Towelhead, Ball directed the pilot episode in the Summer of 2007 with cast members Anna Paquin, Stephen Moyer, Ryan Kwanten, Sam Trammell and Brook Kerr. On the casting of Paquin as telepathic waitress Sookie Stackhouse, Ball commented, "When I heard Anna wanted to come in and read for Sookie, I was surprised. I thought, 'Well, why does she want to do this, she's a movie star?' ... and then I thought about it and I thought, 'It makes perfect sense, it's a great role.' It's the lead of the show, she's sexy and she's the romantic heroine ... and she gets to play the gamut of human emotion." Continuing he said, "Once she came in and she started reading and I started working with her, what she was playing and what I thought really made the character really interesting was I could see that this was a woman who had been hearing other people's thoughts her entire life, and that she was kind of skittish and nervous and jumpy and a little angry." On casting Stephen Moyer as vampire Bill Compton Ball said, "It was a really hard role to cast, we saw a lot of men ... and then I saw Stephen ... and there was something so, for lack of a better word, real about him and this sort world-weary but tragic feeling that he brought to it. Aside from being really, really handsome, which helps." Brooke Kerr, who was best known for her role on the NBC soap opera Passions, originally played the character of Tara Thornton. However, she was replaced by Rutina Wesley after the second episode had been filmed.

On August 9, 2007, HBO took True Blood to series, ordering an additional eleven episodes for a full season order with Ball acting as executive producer and showrunner. At that point, Ball had already written the next two episodes.

An early version of the pilot was leaked online in June 2008 and was met with fairly negative reviews from online bloggers.

== Reception ==
=== Critical reaction ===
The series premiere received generally favorable reviews. Robert Bianco from USA Today called it "... a much-needed infusion of new, well, blood." and said "Blood proves there's still vibrant life—or death—left in the "star-crossed lovers" paradigm." Tom Shales of The Washington Post called True Blood "an audacious, outrageous, grisly comic drama ..." and said the show "isn't meant to be an exercise in good taste. Just a romp and a wallow – and a bloody good one." Robert Abele from LA Weekly called the series an "effortlessly entertaining potboiler about the allure of dangerous attraction after probably a few too many shows drearily dissecting broken relationships." Hal Boedecker of the Orlando Sentinel praised True Blood as being "one of the strongest new series in an uncertain fall ... Alan Ball has adapted Charlaine Harris' novels with wit, verve and passion." Tim Goodman from the San Francisco Chronicle praised the performances in the episode, saying Paquin is "deceptively intriguing" and that both she and Moyer "do well here."

Alan Sepinwall gave the series a fairly negative review, saying "... It's the kind of show where you have to care a lot more about vampires than I do to stick around for long." He went on to say, "most of it is really not worth seeing." Michael Judge from The Wall Street Journal said the series "too often passes over the truly macabre or grotesque for gratuitous sex and violence" and then said "I know True Blood is supposed to be a sexy, easy-to-swallow mystery, but too often it ends up leaving a bad taste in one's mouth." James Poniewozik from Time magazine called Ball's characters "caricatures" and continued by asking "Was the world dying for an HBO show with no subtext? Take away the graphic sex, and True Blood could air on USA Network." The Chicago Tribune's Maureen Ryan said "The overheated melodrama sometimes makes the lives of these people seem faintly ridiculous..."

=== Ratings ===
The episode was viewed by approximately 1.4 million people upon its initial broadcast. After a repeat showing later the same night, those figures rose to 2.1 million. When on-demand viewings and additional broadcasts are factored in, the episode was viewed by approximately 4 million viewers.

In the United Kingdom, the pilot episode achieved 1.91 million viewers on Channel 4.
