= Eric Northman =

- The Southern Vampire Mysteries; True Blood character
- Alexander Skarsgård as Eric Northman in True Blood.
- First appearance: Novel: Dead Until Dark; Television: "Escape from Dragon House"
- Last appearance: Novel: Dead Ever After; Television: "Thank You"
- Created by: Charlaine Harris
- Adapted by: Alan Ball (True Blood)
- Portrayed by: Alexander Skarsgård

In-universe information
- Nickname: Viking
- Species: Vampire
- Gender: Male
- Occupation: Bar owner Vampire Sheriff of Area 5 Louisiana; Chancellor of the Vampire Authority (in TV series)
- Family: Novels: Appius Livius Ocella (maker; deceased); Alexei Romanov (vampire brother; deceased); Unnamed human mother (deceased); Unnamed human father (deceased); Unnamed human brother (deceased); TV series: Godric (maker); Nora Gainesborough (vampire sister); Unnamed human mother (deceased); Unnamed human father (deceased); Unnamed human sister (deceased)
- Spouses: Novels: Aude; Sookie Stackhouse; Queen Freyda of Oklahoma
- Children: Novels: Pam Ravenscroft (progeny); Karin (progeny); 6 unnamed human children (deceased); TV series: Pamela Swynford De Beaufort (progeny); Willa Burrell (progeny)

Eric Northman is a fictional character in The Southern Vampire Mysteries book series, written by author Charlaine Harris. The character is introduced in the first novel, Dead Until Dark, and appears in all subsequent novels. In True Blood, the HBO television adaptation, Eric is portrayed by actor Alexander Skarsgård.

Eric is a vampire who owns a bar in Shreveport, Louisiana, called "Fangtasia."

== Backstory and abilities ==
Eric Northman is a born-Viking warrior with a successful business and authority in the vampire hierarchy. Although some details align, Eric's background differs between the True Blood novels and the television adaptation.

As a maker, Eric can also forcibly command his progeny. He possesses super-speed, moving faster than bullets and appearing as a blur. He heals instantly from non-fatal injuries and is immune to all diseases except Hepatitis V. He has heightened senses, including the ability to see in complete darkness. He can also fly, a rare vampiric ability (possibly attributed to Godric's bloodline on the television series).

The name "Eric" (or "Erik") comes from Old Norse, meaning "one ruler" or "eternal ruler". Traditionally given to people who could speak Old Norse, the language of Scandinavian countries, "Norseman" is a term for "man from the north."

=== Book series ===
Although kept vague early on, Dead and Gone reveals that Eric is the son of a Viking chief. He was considered a man at twelve, and married his brother's widow, Aude, by sixteen. The couple had six children; only three were living by the time he was ambushed and subsequently turned by the Roman vampire, Appius Livius Ocella. Aude and their sixth child died of fever when Eric was in his early twenties.

In the first novel, Dead Until Dark, Sookie Stackhouse finds the six-foot-four, blond, blue-eyed Viking "hunk" extremely attractive, noting his broad-shouldered physique ("Kind of like the guys on the cover of romance books.") When Sookie sees him naked for the first time in Dead to the World, she thinks: “If there were an international butt competition, Eric would win, hands down – or cheeks up.”

Eric is arrogant but possesses a certain joie de vivre. In Charlaine Harris' short story, "Dracula Night", Eric hosts an annual party at Fangtasia to celebrate Dracula's birthday with the hope that the "Lord of Darkness" will make a personal appearance. This childlike hope is depicted similarly to Linus van Pelt waiting for the Great Pumpkin on Halloween.

Eric is confident almost to a fault, once reprimanding a thug for threatening Sookie and referring to her as his "future lover", although no romantic relationship between Eric and Sookie had been established. Though manipulative at times, he is typically forthright, making his position clear, and is genuinely concerned for Sookie's well-being.

=== Television adaptation ===
In the HBO series True Blood, Eric is a former Viking prince. Under the command of Vampire King Russell Edgington, werewolves attacked the Northman home, killing his mother and baby sister, fatally wounding his father, and stealing his crown (Season 3, Episode 5). Godric, an ancient vampire, offered to Eric immortality sometime in the early 10th century.

In Season 3, Eric says he played by the North Sea as a child. His progency, Pam, alludes to Eric being Swedish ("I have no interest in inheriting your farm on Öland. That place is a windy shit-hole.") In some episodes, Eric speaks with Pam and Godric in Swedish.

Skarsgård disliked the “Fabio-style” wig for Eric in the first season. He was thrilled when it was revealed that Pam cuts and dyes Eric's hair early on in season two, a moment that emphasizes the playful and complex nature of their maker-progeny relationship. “When Eric goes down into the dungeon to rip that guy apart in front of Lafayette,” the actor recalled on the Truest Blood podcast. “His main concern is getting blood and brains in his hair — because Pam's going to kill me.”

Similar to the book series, Eric is largely ruthless and indifferent to humans, with a softer side reserved for his progeny, Pam. In the television series, Pam slits her own wrists after Eric denies her request to be turned, forcing him to do it to save her life. (In the books, Eric offers Pam immortality voluntarily.)

== Storylines ==
=== The Southern Vampire Mysteries ===
==== Role and status ====
The vampires in The Southern Vampire Mysteries (and True Blood) follow a feudal system. States are divided into "Areas" governed by a sheriff who reports to the king or queen of that region. Large states like California have multiple kingdoms, but Louisiana is typically ruled by one monarch. Monarchs can control several states.

Eric is the Sheriff of Area Five in northern Louisiana, a territory that includes the small town of Bon Temps. He operates from his Shreveport bar, "Fangtasia," with his progeny, Pam, and a few underlings. He takes his role seriously, paying a fine for murdering the former vampire bartender, Long Shadow, and owes fealty to his monarch.

After Hurricane Katrina and the death of the Queen of Louisiana disrupted Louisiana's hierarchy, as the last surviving sheriff, Eric strategically pledges allegiance to the new King, Felipe de Castro. This act protected his followers, including Sookie, and maintained control politically. Despite his oath, Eric remains vigilant for opportunities to further secure his position or free himself entirely from scrutiny of Felipe's Louisiana representative, Victor.

==== Relationship with Sookie Stackhouse ====
First introduced in Dead Until Dark, Eric repeatedly saves Sookie's life throughout The Southern Vampire Mysteries. They become intimate, notably starting a sexual relationship in Dead to the World though, due to a curse, he loses his memories of that time until later in the series. Eric develops genuine affection for Sookie, sparking a rivalry with Bill Compton.

In All Together Dead, Eric forms a blood bond with Sookie to prevent her from bonding with another powerful vampire, Andre. In Dead and Gone, he tricks Sookie into a vampire marriage ceremony to protect her from King Felipe de Castro’s representative, Victor Madden. He reveals the memory curse placed on him made him seek out his “heart's desire": Sookie. Eric and Sookie begin a true relationship in Dead in the Family.

Their relationship is threatened in Deadlocked by Eric's pre-existing obligation to marry the Queen of Oklahoma: a command from his dead maker, Appius. Eric hints Sookie could use her cluviel dor, a fairy object that grants one wish, in order to make him stay. Sookie uses the wish to save Sam Merlotte’s life, and Eric walks away, leaving their future uncertain.

In the final novel, Dead Ever After, Eric and Sookie's relationship definitively ends. Per his makers wishes, Eric intends to marry Queen Freyda of Oklahoma and is banned from ever seeing Sookie again. Sookie is banned from Fangtasia an Oklahoma. In one of their last conversations, Eric admits that he considered turning Sookie into a vampire despite her wishes. The book concludes with Eric in Oklahoma with his new wife and without his progeny.

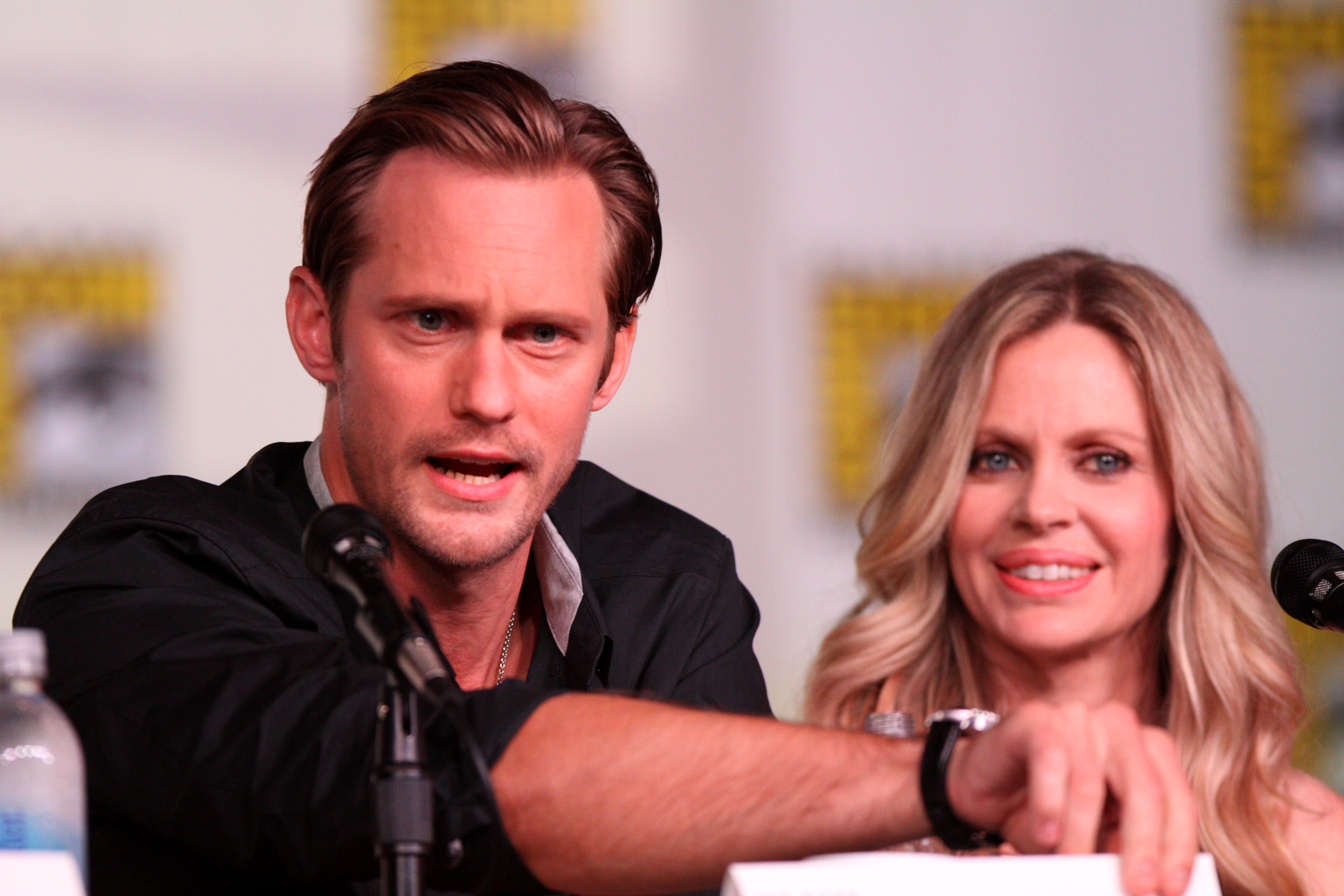
Actors Alexander Skarsgard and Kristin Bauer van Straten played Eric Northman and Pamela Swynford De Beaufort in the television adaptation.

=== True Blood ===
In the HBO series True Blood, Eric shares a deep loyalty with his maker, Godric. In Season 2, Godric commits suicide by exposing himself to sunlight, which makes Eric weep bloody vampire tears. Eric initially shows guarded affection for Sookie, often appearing violent, manipulative, and arrogant, though he ultimately seems to act protectively.

Eric's growing feelings for Sookie become clearer during the third season. He daydreams about Sookie, and kisses her after proclaiming that if he were to die a true death without having at least kissed her, that would be his greatest regret. A few minutes later, he chains her up as bait for Russell Edgington. In the finale, he shows regret over her pain over her breakup with Bill (despite giving her the information that led to his banishment).

Eric feigns loyalty to Russell, now the King of Mississippi, in Season 3 in order to save Pam from torture by the Magister. He recognizes a crown in Russell's antique collection as his father's, stolen the night of his families murder. He continues to play up his loyalty to Russell to keep him from growing suspicious. Despite appearing indifferent to Sookie's eventual capture, Eric murders Russell's progency and husband, Talbot. Sensing Talbot's death, Russell is driven insane by grief and rage. Russell hunts him down, but Eric offers Russell the ability to daywalk by (forcibly) consuming Sookie's blood. The effect is temporary; Eric cuffs himself to Russell with silver, intending for both of them to burn to death, but Sookie saves them both. Eric spares Russell, burying him alive in silver chains and wet concrete, intending for him to suffer for 100 years.

In Season 4, Eric loses his memory after a witch coven curses him. Sookie shelters the "new Eric" in her house from Bill. Endeared by Eric's newfound innocence and regret over his previous crimes. They become lovers, though she chooses neither him nor Bill in the finale. By the end of the season, Eric regains his memories but retains a gentler side.

After previously killing Nan Flanagan, Eric and Bill are arrested by the Vampire Authority in Season 5. Eric's 'sister,' Nora, rescues them, but they are soon all recaptured. Bill accepts the Book of Lilith from the Sanguinista movement, betraying Eric. Eric successfully escapes with Nora, kills Russell, and attempts to save Bill but appears to fail. Later, he returns to Sookie's house for her protection but she banishes him.

In Season 6, Eric faces a threat from humans, particularly Governor Truman Burrell who declares war on vampires. To challenge the governor's stance, Eric turns the Governor's open-minded daughter, Willa Burrell, into a vampire. Unfortunately, Eric and Willa are captured and placed in the governor's "Vamp Camp." Eric is forced to watch Nora receive a lethal injection of "Hep V". Eric uses Willa to escape the camp, promising to free his progeny Pam and Willa. Willa demands he frees Jessica and Tara as well. They take Nora to the Lilith-enhanced Bill but prove unable to save her. Eric violently slaughters the camp staff for revenge, freeing the imprisoned vampires. He spares Jason Stackhouse but kills vampire Steve Newlin. In the finale, Jason kills the fairy-vampire hybrid Warlow to save Sookie. Once Warlow dies, the effect of his daywalking blood wears off on the vampires who drank it. Eric is shown burning in the sun on a mountaintop in Sweden.

In Season 7, Pam finds a Hep V-infected Eric, who somehow survived. They track Sarah Newlin, the living antidote. They work with the Yakanomo Corporation/Yakuza to capture her. Eric drinks her blood and is cured. The Yakuza suggests making a profitable New Blood cure. Eric secretly reveals the cure to Sookie, offering to heal Bill, who refuses. Eric accepts Bill's choice, making peace with him and Sookie. Eric and Pam murder the Yakuza, claim all the profit, and start a multibillion-dollar "New Blood" corporation from Sarah Newlin's blood, which is a cure for Hep V and a food source. They keep Sarah chained in Fangtasia's basement as a source for the cure, charging high prices, while Eric reigns.

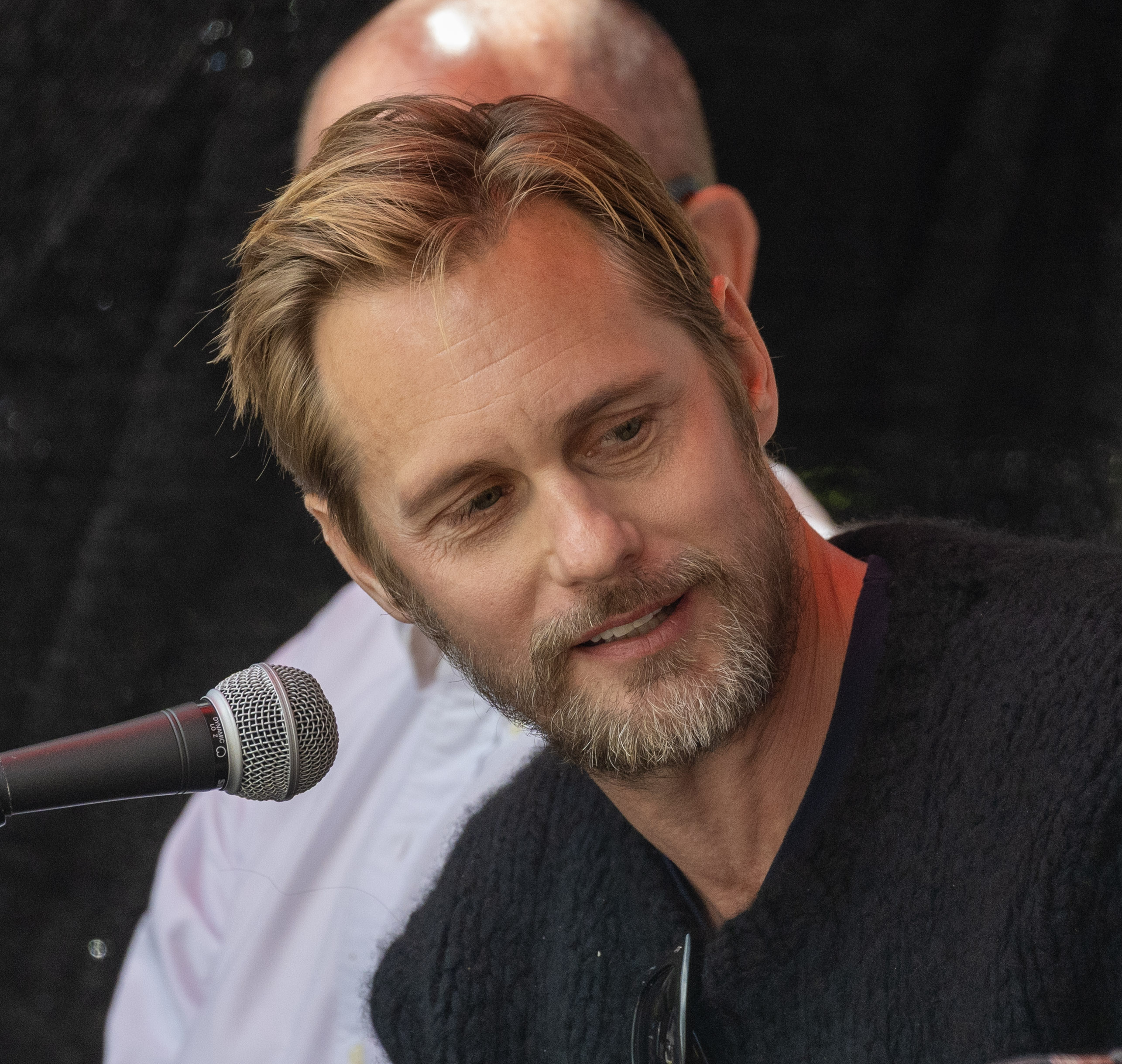
Alexander Skarsgård at the 2025 Telluride Film Festival.

== Casting and reception ==
Alexander Skarsgård initially auditioned for the role of Bill Compton in the True Blood pilot. Showrunner Alan Ball recalled, "[Alexander] had long hair... [he] looked like a Scandinavian farmer." Despite this initial impression, Ball immediately thought, "Oh, that's Eric."

Skarsgård didn't hear back immediately about the part. When casting contacted him about auditioning for Eric Northman, he was unavailable while filming Generation Kill on location in South Africa, Mozambique, and Namibia. The delay caused by the 2007–08 Writers' Strike pushed back True Blood's production, allowing Skarsgård to complete production on Generation Kill and then audition for and secure the role of Eric Northman.

Skarsgård's portrayal was received enthusiastically by fans of both the books and television series. After ending of Sookie and Eric’s relationship in the final Southern Vampire Mysteries book, author Charlaine Harris received death threats. Harris allegedly considered hiring a bodyguard, attributing the backlash to the show influencing fan perception of Eric's motives, saying she "made it clear that his first choice was always going to be himself." She jokingly blamed Skarsgård, stating, "I told Alexander it was all his fault."

Reflecting on the character's development, Skarsgård noted that Eric was initially introduced as a "menacing villain." He particularly enjoyed the evolution of Eric's character, particularly his rich backstory and relationship with his "daughter" or vampire progeny: "this super powerful old vampire [who's] scared of his teenage daughter? It was so fun to take [the character] in that direction." He added that he believed Eric and Pam's relationship was most interesting aspect the character's life.

In 2025, Skarsgård filmed a cameo appearance as Eric Northman for the sixth season of What We Do in the Shadows.
