= Delahoussaye =

Delahoussaye is a surname. Notable people with the surname include:

- Eddie Delahoussaye (born 1951), American jockey
- Hadley Delahoussaye, The Southern Vampire Mysteries fictional character
- Ryan Delahoussaye, member of American alternative rock band Blue October
