= Pamela Swynford De Beaufort =

Pamela Swynford de Beaufort
- ''The Southern Vampire Mysteries and True Blood'' character
- Kristin Bauer van Straten stars as Pamela Swynford De Beaufort in True Blood
- First appearance: Novel: Dead Until Dark; Television: "Escape from the Dragon House"; 1x04
- Last appearance: Television: "Thank You"; 7x10
- Created by: Charlaine Harris
- Adapted by: Alan Ball
- Portrayed by: Kristin Bauer van Straten

In-universe information
- Alias: Pamela Ravenscroft (novels)
- Species: Vampire
- Occupation: Owner of Fangtasia
- Family: Eric Northman (maker); Karin (elder vampire sister in novels); Willa Burrell (baby vampire sister in TV series)
- Children: Tara Thornton (progeny); Colin (progeny)
- Relatives: Nora Gainesborough (vampire aunt in TV series); Godric (vampire grandfather in TV series)

Pamela "Pam" Ravenscroft, also known as Pamela Swynford De Beaufort, is a fictional character from the television series True Blood. Pam is portrayed by actress Kristin Bauer van Straten. The series was created by Alan Ball and is based on The Southern Vampire Mysteries by author Charlaine Harris.

In the series, Pam is a vampire sired by Eric Northman. She is the co-owner of Fangtasia, a vampire bar. Her age is never explicitly referenced in the television series. In the short story "Two Blondes," it is revealed that she is approximately 160 years old.

== Fictional history ==
=== The Southern Vampires Mysteries ===
==== Background ====
Pam's human life is rarely referenced in the novels until the seventh book in the series, All Together Dead, when Pam tells Sookie Stackhouse that she lived in London with her parents during the Victorian era.

As a human, Pam was characterized as romantic and bold. At the age of 19, while traveling at night to see a friend's cousin with whom she had a romantic relationship, she encounters the vampire Eric Northman. Eric becomes her "maker," draining her of blood and digging up her grave.

==== Physical description, personality, and traits ====
Harris describes Pam as looking like a young, middle-class, suburban housewife. Harris also describes Pam as "Alice in Wonderland with fangs". In an internal monologue, Sookie describes her as "ethereally lovely, with a kind of deadly edge." Pam is described as round-faced with a chalky pale complexion, with dark blue eyes and straight blond hair "white as a magnolia petal". She is also described as shorter than Sookie, who is 5 feet 6 inches tall.

In the novels — and television adaptation — Pam demonstrates that she believes that vampires are superior to humans. She claims that she was quite happy to be turned into a vampire; Pam maintains that she would have grown into a bitter and ultimately cruel person due to the limited opportunities available to human women in the Victorian era.

Throughout the series, Pam is portrayed as callous, amoral, and self-centered. She takes joy in teasing and provoking others, such as Fellowship of the Sun members Sookie, Felicia, and especially Eric. When Sookie first enters Fangtasia, Pam reveals that she "never forgets a face." (Later in the series, when Jessica calls Pam, Pam responds by saying, "Yes, I remember you perfectly.") Pam uses Sookie's entrance into Fangtasia as ammunition to tease Eric.

Like her maker, Eric, Pam is violent and vengeful although she often expresses her wit through dry humor. In the book series, Pam typically speaks with an American accent but is shown to slip into a slightly old English accent when excited. She is skilled in combat and confident in her ability to overcome most foes and survive most attacks, even from other supernaturals.

==== Relationships ====
In the book series, Pam is portrayed as bisexual (and more fond of women.) In From Dead to Worse, she dates Amelia Broadway, a witch who is Sookie's roommate.

Pam can often be seen beside Eric, whom she is bound to obey. She has been in love with Eric since she first met him, and often displays concern for Eric's happiness and well-being.

Pam is friends with Sookie, whom she sometimes calls her "telepathic friend" and her "favorite breather". Sookie rescues Pam twice in the series: during a battle with witches (Dead to the World) and from a collapsing hotel (All Together Dead).

==== Work and position within the vampire hierarchy ====
Harris introduces Pam as the co-owner of Fangtasia and Eric's second-in-command. Later in the book series, it is revealed that Eric asked Pam to leave Minnesota and move to Louisiana to help him run the bar. Pam is based at the bar as a bouncer and co-owner but has other duties in Eric's various business dealings.

When Eric experiences memory loss, Pam takes a more prominent role in the plot of the fourth novel (Dead to the World).

After Eric marries the Queen of Oklahoma, Freyda, Pam becomes the new vampire sheriff of area 5 in Louisiana (Dead Ever After).

== Television portrayal ==
In True Blood, the HBO adaptation of The Southern Vampire Mysteries, Pam is renamed Pamela ("Pam") Swynford De Beaufort. She is portrayed by Kristin Bauer van Straten, who first appeared in a video on BloodCopy.com (“The Vampire in Baton Rouge”). She was introduced in episode 4, "Escape from Dragon House". Pam was a recurring character throughout the first and second season, but became a credited cast member on the show from the third season through the series finale. The character was significantly re-imagined from the novels.

=== Background ===
In the adaptation, Bill mentions that she was turned 100 years ago during the period of the Old West. In "Authority Always Wins", an episode from the fifth season, Pam experiences flashbacks to 1905 when she worked as the madam of a brothel. The episode reveals that Eric saved her from a man who wished to kill her. In this storyline, Eric only turned Pam — who feared the life of an old ex-prostitute — after she threatened suicide. In the fifth season of the television series, Pam is described as a madam during her human life in a Barbary Coast (San Francisco) brothel in 1905. However, the season five finale also makes a reference to her human history in England.

Pam is shown to occasionally speak Swedish. She is portrayed as a strong, sarcastic, and hard-natured character who feels little for anyone but her maker, Eric Northman. Pam is shown to put aside her personal feelings towards Sookie in the fourth season; when Eric loses his memory, Pam asks Sookie to look after him.

=== Relationships ===
Pam turns Tara Thornton into a vampire after she is shot and left for dead. Pam gives her work at Fangtasia as a bartender and later as a dancer. As the series progresses, Pam and Tara develop romantic feelings for each other.

In the fifth season, Eric "releases" Pam. When Eric, her maker, releases his progeny from their blood bond, it enables Pam to follow her own free choosing and will. She no longer has to answer to him as her maker. In the final season, Pam and Eric get rich from the cure for "Hep V": a fatal virus genetically engineered by the human government to exterminate vampires. By the end of the series, they are happily living together again.
