= Tara Thornton =

- True Blood character
- Rutina Wesley as Tara in True Blood, the television adaption of The Southern Vampire Mysteries.
- First appearance: Novel: Living Dead in Dallas; Television: "Strange Love"
- Created by: Charlaine Harris
- Portrayed by: Rutina Wesley

In-universe information
- Nickname: Tara Mae Thornton
- Occupation: Novel: Owner of Tara's Togs; Television: Bartender
- Family: Lettie Mae (mother); Lafayette Reynolds (cousin); Ruby Jean Reynolds (aunt)
- Spouses: Novel: JB du Rone (husband)
- Children: Novel: Robert Thornton du Rone (son); Sara Sookie du Rone (daughter)
- Nationality: American

Tara Mae Thornton is a fictional character in Charlaine Harris' The Southern Vampire Mysteries and its television adaptation, HBO's True Blood.

== Fictional biography ==
Tara Mae Thornton is a Louisiana native in her twenties and lifelong friend of the main protagonist, Sookie Stackhouse.

The books establish that Tara's parents were abusive alcoholics. The television show expands Tara's family to include her cousin Lafayette Reynolds and his mother, Ruby Jean Reynolds.

=== The Southern Vampire Mysteries ===
Tara has two siblings, a brother and a sister. They left Bon Temps and Tara behind as soon as they were able to. In Living Dead in Dallas, Tara is engaged to "Eggs" Benedict Talley, but this relationship ends when a secret sex party they attend goes awry. She then opens up a clothing store called "Tara's Togs" and briefly dates the vampire Franklin Mott. He dumps her and gives her to the vampire Mickey, a sadist, from whom Sookie and the vampire Eric Northman must rescue her.

During the events of All Together Dead, Tara and JB du Rone elope. Tara confides to Sookie that she's pregnant, and though did not plan on having a baby, feels she should try to be the great mother that she never had. Claude reveals that Tara is having twins, a boy and a girl. She gives birth to a daughter named Sara Sookie and a son named Robert Thornton, with help from Sookie. She and JB go through financial problems after the birth of the twins. To Tara's annoyance, JB starts work as a stripper at Hooligans, a bar owned by Claude. After the events of Dead Ever After, Tara and JB divorce. Tara becomes successful in her business, opening a series of clothing stores.

=== True Blood ===
In the HBO series True Blood, Tara is portrayed by actress Rutina Wesley. Actress Brook Kerr was originally cast in the role but was replaced after the pilot episode. She first appeared in the BloodCopy.com's video “Maxine & Tara Thornton interview”.

==== Seasons 1 and 2 ====
At the beginning of the television show, Tara lives with her mother Lettie Mae, who is described as an alcoholic turned fundamentalist who makes Tara's life miserable. As a child, Tara would run to Sookie's house to get away from her mother's beatings. Because of this, and Tara's acceptance of Sookie as a telepath, they became best friends. Despite enduring years of abuse, neglect, and disappointment from her mother, Tara still cares about Lettie Mae's well-being. Tara is depicted as a very angry and wounded individual.

Tara leaves her mother's house and moves into Lafayette's home. The discovery of a hidden webcam in his bathroom results in her moving out into her own apartment. After her mother undergoes an exorcism, Tara briefly moves back in with her, but is then arrested for driving under the influence, so Lettie Mae kicks Tara back out. Tara is bailed out by the mysterious social worker Maryann Forrester, and she takes up residence at Maryann's estate.

Tara and Sam Merlotte, her boss, explore a romantic relationship. Before they can give it another try, Tara meets "Eggs" Benedict Talley, who also lives with Maryann. Sensing that something is not right with Maryann, Tara moves in with Sookie, who goes to Dallas and leaves Tara alone. Tara succumbs to the draw of Maryann and Eggs, but instead of moving in with them, Tara invites the pair to move into Sookie's. Tara falls in love with Eggs, and the relationship ends when Eggs is killed by Jason Stackhouse.

==== Seasons 3 and 4 ====
Tara crosses paths with the sociopathic vampire Franklin Mott. Franklin glamours, bites, and kidnaps her, keeping her bound in a bathroom. He takes her to the Mississippi mansion of Russell Edgington. Franklin mixes romantic talk of turning her into a vampire with coercive actions, while Tara attempts to soothe him with compliance while plotting her own escape. She escapes him on her second attempt and makes it back to Bon Temps, where she seeks help in a rape survivors' group. Franklin confronts her in the parking lot of Merlotte's Bar and Grill a few nights later and attempts to kidnap her again. Jason Stackhouse arrives and kills Franklin.

Jason, whom Tara has had a crush on since childhood, takes her back to his house to recover. They kiss, but then Jason confesses to having shot Eggs. Tara leaves his house and goes back to Merlotte's where she finds Sam. The two spend another night together. When Sam reveals his shape-shifting secret to her, she leaves his house and goes back to her mother's, where she finds Lettie Mae in an intimate situation with Reverend Daniels. Overwhelmed, Tara leaves Bon Temps for New Orleans, where she changes her first name to Toni and finds work as an MMA-style cage fighter. Tara starts a relationship with another fighter, Naomi, but eventually returns to Bon Temps and, through her association with the medium Marnie Stonebrook, becomes entangled in the vampires' battle against necromancy. Shortly afterward, she pushes Sookie out of the way of a shotgun blast from Debbie Pelt, and the buckshot hits Tara in the head and neck.

==== Seasons 5, 6, and 7 ====
After being shot and left for dead, Tara is turned into a vampire by Pamela Swynford De Beaufort at the request of Lafayette and Sookie. Tara attacks Lafayette and Sookie upon awaking, resentful that they turned her into a vampire. Pam gives her work at Fangtasia first as a bartender, and later as a dancer. As the fifth season progresses, Tara becomes more comfortable with her new life, befriends fellow new vampire Jessica Hamby, and begins to develop romantic feelings for Pam. During Eric Northman and Bill Compton's involvement with the Vampire Authority, Tara assists in the murder of vampire sheriff Elijah Stormer. Pam is arrested by the Authority and held captive, being freed when Tara joins Eric, Jason, Sookie, and Nora Gainesborough for an infiltration of the Authority's headquarters. Upon reuniting, Tara and Pam kiss.

Tara and Pam are captured and held in vampire prison camps, created by Louisiana governor Truman Burrell as part of the state's efforts to control the vampire population. She becomes friends with Willa Burrell, the governor's daughter, who was turned by Eric. The group escapes when Bill breaks into the camp and feeds the vampires his faerie-infused blood, which allows them to briefly walk in sunlight.

Tara is killed by another vampire in episode 1 of season 7.

Throughout season 7, Tara appears to her mother, who is under the influence of vampire blood, trying to tell her something about their past. In episode 8, it is revealed Tara had an abusive father who left them after a fight with Lettie Mae. During the fight, a young Tara pulls out her father's gun and almost shoots him but decides to bury the gun in the yard, resulting in his departure. At the end of the series, Tara and Lettie Mae make peace. Tara asks her mother to forgive herself and let Tara go. They share a tearful hug, and Tara moves on to the afterlife.

== Bibliography ==
The character of Tara Thornton appears in the following:

1. Living Dead in Dallas (March 2002, ISBN 0-441-00923-9)
2. Club Dead (May 2003, ISBN 0-441-01051-2)
3. Dead to the World (May 2004, hardcover ISBN 0-441-01167-5, 2005, paperback ISBN 0-441-01218-3)
4. "Fairy Dust" from Powers of Detection (October 2004, ISBN 0-441-01197-7)
5. "One Word Answer" from Bite (2005, ISBN 0-515-13970-X)
6. Dead as a Doornail (May 2005, hardcover ISBN 0-441-01279-5, April 2006, audio book ISBN 1-4193-3730-0, paperback ISBN 0-441-01333-3)
7. Definitely Dead (May 2006, hardcover ISBN 0-441-01400-3, audio book ISBN 1-4193-9326-X)
8. All Together Dead (May 2007, hardcover ISBN 0-441-01494-1)
9. "Dracula Night" from Many Bloody Returns (September 2007, hardcover ISBN 0-441-01522-0)
10. From Dead to Worse (May 2008, hardcover ISBN 0-441-01589-1)
11. Dead in the Family (May 2010, hardcover ISBN 978-0-441-01864-2)
