= Dead Until Dark =

Novel by Charlaine Harris

- Cover of Dead Until Dark
- Author: Charlaine Harris
- Cover artist: Lisa Desimini
- Language: English
- Series: The Southern Vampire Mysteries
- Subject: Vampires
- Genre: Fantasy, Mystery, Gothic, Romance
- Publisher: Ace Books
- Publication date: May 1, 2001
- Publication place: United States
- Media type: Print (Hardcover, Paperback) e-Book (Kindle); Audio Book (CD)
- Pages: 292 (Hardcover)
- ISBN: 0-441-00853-4
- OCLC: 46875089
- LC Class: CPB Box no. 1850 vol. 12
- Followed by: Living Dead in Dallas

Dead Until Dark, published in 2001, is the first novel in Charlaine Harris' series The Southern Vampire Mysteries. It was adapted into True Blood's first season.

Like the rest of the series, Dead Until Dark is narrated by Sookie Stackhouse, a telepathic waitress from the small fictional Louisiana town of Bon Temps, not far from the non-fictional town of Shreveport. It is set during the early 2000s, approximately the same time as the book's publication.

== Popularity ==
As of May 20, 2013, Publishers Weekly reported that Dead Until Dark had sold 1,315,830 units leading up to the release of the series' final installment, Dead Ever After.

The television series True Blood was based on the books.

== Plot ==
In the world of the novel, vampires (and other supernatural creatures) are a reality. Sookie Stackhouse falls in love with the vampire, Bill Compton, whom she met at the diner where she works, Merlotte's, owned by Sam Merlotte. At some point in the recent past, Sookie tells us, the invention of synthetic blood, called Tru Blood, has made it unnecessary for vampires to feed on humans for sustenance, thus allowing the world's previously underground vampire community to reveal its existence to humans. Also relevant to plot development is the fact that vampire blood accelerates healing, increases strength, improves the libido, and makes the person who drinks it better-looking.

== Critical reception ==
In a 2009 review for Bookseller, Celia Leary described Dead Until Dark as "candyfloss – fun for a second, but not filling", lamenting that the book fell flat compared to the TV series. She wrote, "The characters are very two dimensional, the plot was pretty obvious, and for a book set in the south of America it had a real lack of diversity."

== Characters ==
- Sookie Stackhouse
- Jason Stackhouse
- Adele Hale
- Bill Compton
- Sam Merlotte
- Arlene Fowler
- Charlsie Tooten
- Laffayette Reynolds
- Terry Bellefleur
- Rene Lenier
- Sheriff Bud Dearborn
- Andy Bellefleur
- Pam
- Eric Northman
- Long Shadow
- Bubba

== See also ==
- Characters of The Southern Vampire Mysteries
- Characters of True Blood
- True Blood
