= Dead Ever After =

2013 novel by Charlaine Harris

- Cover of Dead Ever After
- Author: Charlaine Harris
- Country: United States
- Language: English
- Genre: Fantasy; Mystery; Gothic; Romance
- Publisher: Ace Books
- Published: May 7, 2013
- Media type: Print (Hardcover, Paperback) e-Book (Kindle, Nook); Audio Book (CD)
- Preceded by: Deadlocked

Dead Ever After is a fantasy novel by Charlaine Harris. It is the thirteenth novel in The Southern Vampire Mysteries series. On May 14, 2012, Charlaine Harris' Facebook administrator announced that Dead Ever After would be the final book of the series and it was released on May 7, 2013.

== Plot ==
The protagonist of the novel is Sookie Stackhouse, a telepathic waitress who works at a bar, of which she has recently become part owner.

At the end of the previous novel, Deadlocked, Sookie used (and used up) a magical artifact called a cluviel dor to save the life of Sam Merlotte, who had been killed by his girlfriend, Jannalynn.

The situation as the novel begins is that Sookie's relationship with Eric Northman, a vampire who is her lover and, in vampire terms, her husband, has cooled suddenly. Meanwhile, Eric's maker had negotiated a marriage between Eric and another vampire, without Eric's consent. However, due to vampire practices, Eric was obliged to go through with the marriage. He had been hoping Sookie would use the cluviel dor to get him out of the marriage, and was upset at Sookie (and jealous) that she used it in the heat of the moment to save Sam instead. During the novel, Eric progresses with his marriage, while Sookie feels endangered by Eric's fiancée, whose jealousy could mean trouble for Sookie. Meanwhile, Sam, who is Sookie's friend and co-owns the bar with her, and for a long time was Sookie's boss, is having a hard time dealing with having been suddenly brought back to life.

Soon Sookie has additional problems. Arlene, who used to be a co-worker and friend of Sookie's, and who once tried to lure Sookie to a painful death as part of a human-supremacist organization that opposed all supernaturals and people like Sookie who consorted with them, has been freed from prison by a mysterious group who it appears has it in for Sookie. At their instigation, Arlene visits Merlotte's bar and asks Sookie for her job at the bar back. Then Arlene's body is found, and Sookie is arrested for her murder.

To help her with these issues, Sookie is visited by her demon godfather, Desmond Cataliades; his niece Diantha; his great-great-grandson, the telepath Barry Horowitz; and the witches Amelia Broadway and Bob.

One day, Sookie stops by Merlotte's and runs into Sam. The two end up having sex for the first time. While both Sookie and Sam are delighted at the prospect of this relationship, Sookie tells Sam they must take it slow. She wants to be sure he's not a rebound relationship. He agrees.

Later that week, Sookie, Sam, Jason and Michele go to Stomping Sally's to dance. Sookie is kidnapped by Johan Glassport and Steve Newlin, then thrown into the back of a van being driven by Claude Crane. While they're driving through the countryside, she manipulates them into a fight and Claude swerves off the road into a corn field. She runs from her kidnappers into the safety of a large group of people from Stomping Sally's, who have chased behind the van in an effort to save Sookie. Johan and Claude are shot dead, but not before Claude smashes the skull of Steve Newlin. He dies hours later, after confessing that he and Johan killed Arlene.

Sookie is the (one and only) bridesmaid at Jason and Michele's wedding. After the ceremony, she finds her seat next to Sam, who tells her how pretty she looks. Later that night, when he drops her off at her home, he suggests he spend the night and she declines. After Sam is gone, she admits to herself that they will probably be together by Christmas, though she won't be destroyed if their relationship doesn't work out.

== Reception ==
The book reached the top of the U.S. Bestsellers list on Thursday, May 16, 2013.

Some fans were highly displeased by the novel's ending. Charlaine Harris decided not to go on tour to promote the book.
