= Sookie Stackhouse =

Fictional character created by Charlaine Harris

- The Southern Vampire Mysteries and True Blood character
- Anna Paquin as Sookie Stackhouse
- First appearance: Novel: Dead Until Dark; Television: "Strange Love"
- Last appearance: Television: "Thank You"; 7x10
- Created by: Charlaine Harris
- Portrayed by: Anna Paquin

In-universe information
- Species: Halfling (half-human, half-fairy)
- Occupation: Barmaid/Waitress
- Family: Jason Stackhouse (brother); Adele Hale Stackhouse (grandmother); Niall Brigant (great-grandfather); Fintan Brigant (grandfather)
- Relatives: Dermot Brigant (great-uncle); Claudine, Claude & Claudette Crane (half cousins once removed); Hadley Hale (cousin); Hunter Savoy (cousin once removed)
- Nationality: American

Sookie Stackhouse is a fictional character and protagonist of The Southern Vampire Mysteries book series, written by Charlaine Harris. In HBO's television adaptation, True Blood, Sookie is portrayed by Anna Paquin.

== Creation and casting ==
Sookie was created by Charlaine Harris. Harris stated that she decided to "shake up my writing style by trying something new". The author said that to do this she would include "all the elements I loved: mystery, the supernatural, bloody adventure, and a dash of romance. And since people had told me for years that I had a great sense of humor, I thought it would be interesting to try to include that in the book, too". Harris went on to establish the protagonist of the series. When naming the character Harris decided to use her grandmother's best friend's name because "it was a fine old Southern nickname, I thought it would do well for my heroine. And "Stackhouse" just flowed right after it". Sookie, Sooky, Sukie, Sukey, Sook etc. are historical Southern U.S. regional nicknames for Susannah or Susan (Hebrew, "Lily").

Young Sookie was present in a couple episodes, with multiple actresses playing the character's younger self, including actress Lily Bigham. Harris wanted to "write from the point of view of a human". To make Sookie more interesting as Harris would have "to live with Sookie" while writing, she decided to have the character start a relationship with a vampire as an introduction to a foreign world. Harris then decided she would have to establish a reason "sensible Sookie" would "do such a crazy thing" which led to her giving Sookie the power of telepathy. In an interview Harris stated that making Sookie telepathic is "the worst thing I could think of to do to anybody". She explained this further saying, "it would just be absolutely horrible to know what people really thought about you." Harris felt that there are "definitely elements of Sookie in me—or, more correctly, there are elements of me in her. [...] I wish I were as brave as she is!" Harris said that when writing for Sookie it is, "second nature to me to step into Sookie's skin".

Anna Paquin was cast in the HBO television adaptation True Blood, with her casting being announced on 26 February 2007. In September 2011, Harris said that although the appearances of some characters in the television adaptation matched what she intended in the novels, Sookie’s did not, saying: "Anna [Paquin] has never been the way I think of as Sookie. I think she does a great job, but she's just not my Sookie".

== Appearances ==
=== Literature ===
==== Dead Until Dark ====
Sookie is a telepathic waitress working in Merlotte's Bar and Grill in Bon Temps, Louisiana. She and her brother, Jason, were raised by their grandmother, Adele Stackhouse, after their parents were killed in a car accident. As a child, Sookie was molested by her great-uncle, Bartlett Hale.

She meets and falls in love with Bill Compton, a vampire to whom she is attracted partly because she cannot read his mind. Sookie saves Bill from Denise and Mack Rattray who intend to drain their victim's blood for use as a narcotic. Sookie is later attacked by the Rattrays but Bill saves Sookie and kills her attackers.

Jason and Bill both become suspects in a series of murders, due to the presence of fang marks on the victims and to their previous relationships with Jason. After Jason is arrested, Sookie visits a vampire bar, Fangtasia, in an attempt to discover if any vampires knew the victims. Sookie meets vampire sheriff Eric Northman, who discovers her telepathy. Sookie uses this ability to help Eric discover that vampire Long Shadow has been embezzling from Fangtasia. A confrontation ensues and Eric saves Sookie's life by staking Long Shadow when he attacks her. Sookie discovers her Gran, Adele, has been murdered. Bill leaves to improve his position in the vampire hierarchy. Sookie discovers that her boss, Sam, is a shape-shifter. While Bill is gone, Sookie discovers that the murderer is her brother's friend Rene Lenier. He almost kills her, but she fights back and manages to get the better of him. Sookie almost kills him with a shovel. Bill returns and is promoted to area investigator, working under Eric.

==== Living Dead in Dallas ====
Sookie is later attacked by a maenad and is treated by Dr Ludwig as instructed by Eric. Eric then sends Sookie to Dallas to search for a missing vampire. Sookie goes to the Fellowship of the Sun church where the Dallas vampires believe the missing vampire to be. The Dallas vampire's associate Hugo accompanies Sookie, who discovers that he is a traitor. Eric is injured while protecting Sookie when trying to escape the church. Eric then tricks Sookie into ingesting his blood so that he will be connected to her. Sookie returns to Bon Temps after arguing with Bill but the pair later reconcile.

==== Club Dead ====
Bill goes missing after traveling to Mississippi and Eric suspects that Lorena, who made Bill a vampire, is to blame. Sookie travels to Mississippi to use her telepathy to try to locate Bill. Sookie is escorted by Alcide Herveaux (a werewolf) to a vampire bar where she learns that Bill is being held captive and that vampire king Russell Edgington may be involved. While attempting to prevent one of Russell's employees from being staked, Sookie herself is injured. While receiving medical treatment at Russell's mansion, Sookie learns that Bill is being tortured in the pool house. Sookie kills Lorena and saves Bill and as they escape, Sookie locks herself in the back of a truck with him as Alcide and Tara drive the truck. Deprived of blood, Bill drinks from Sookie. When Alcide pulls over to pee on the side of the road, Tara finds Sookie nearly dead. Tara throws Bill out to leave him in the sun and Tara and Alcide take Sookie to a hospital where they discover she does not have a blood type. She is in a coma. Tara calls Jason and both Jason and Lafayette go to the hospital to sit with Sookie. Bill comes into the room and Jason allows Bill to add his blood to her IV. Sookie awakes in shock. Sookie is driven home by Eric. On the way back to Bon Temps two people raid a gas station while looking for Sookie and Eric. At Sookie's house Eric and Sookie are attacked by several werewolves who are then killed. Sookie ends her relationship with Bill.

==== Dead to the World ====
Sookie finds Eric, who has had his memory wiped. She is persuaded by Eric's second in command, Pam Ravenscroft, to allow him to live with her. Sookie learns that a witch coven is believed responsible for Eric's memory loss. Jason goes missing. Sookie has sex with Eric and falls in love with him. Bill shoots the witch responsible for Eric’s memory loss and Pam’s curse(resulting in it being broken). Sookie uses her fae powers on Eric causing him to get his memory back. Jason has been kidnapped and held in Hotshot by Crystal and Coot, who tried to turn him into a werepanther. Alcide's jealous girlfriend, Debbie Pelt, breaks into Sookie's house and tries to shoot her but Eric takes the bullet before Sookie shoots Debbie.

==== Dead as a Doornail ====
Sookie learns several were-animals and shape-shifters have been shot and injured, including Sam. Sookie gets a replacement Bartender, Charles Twining, from Eric. Jason is blamed by Calvin Norris, leader of Hotshot, for the shootings. Sookie's house is set on fire but Sookie is rescued by her fairy godmother, Claudine Crane. A dead man is found outside and is blamed for the fire. Sookie is shot. While trying with Sam to track down the shooter, Sookie is confronted by Merlotte's employee Sweetie Des Arts who reveals herself as the shooter and then also shoots Tray Dawson, a werewolf protecting Sookie sent by Calvin, before being shot dead by Andy Bellefleur. Charles attacks Sookie and reveals that he was sent by Longshadow's maker to hurt Eric by taking something that he loves. Charles had shot Sam so that Sookie must find a replacement bartender and had set her house on fire before framing an innocent man. Sookie learns her friend Tara Thornton is being forced into a relationship with Mickey. Eric helps free Tara of Mickey but in exchange Sookie tells Eric about what happened when he had amnesia including their relationship and her killing of Debbie.

==== Definitely Dead ====
Sookie begins dating Quinn and is attacked by werewolves while on a date with Quinn. Sookie learns that her vampire cousin, Hadley Delahoussaye, has been murdered. Hadley's landlord, witch Amelia Broadway, had put Hadley's apartment under a spell but when the spell is broken Sookie and Amelia are attacked by newly turned vampire Jake Purifoy who does not rise due to Amelia's spell. Sookie and Amelia are taken to the hospital where Bill, while being pressured by Eric, reveals that he had been asked to move to Bon Temps to learn more about Sookie's telepathy. Sookie tells the vampire Queen of Louisiana, Sophie-Anne Leclerq that Amelia plans to magically reconstruct the time of Jake's turning, which Sophie-Anne watches the witches perform. Sophie-Anne tells Sookie that she has fairy blood which attracts supernaturals. Sophie-Anne asks Sookie to look through Hadley's apartment to locate a missing diamond bracelet once given to the queen by her husband; the discovery that this bracelet is missing would mean political disaster for Sophie-Anne. A group of Werewolves kidnaps Sookie and takes her to the Pelt family. With help from Eric, Sookie is able to resolve her differences with the Pelts. Sookie and Quinn attend the party Sophie-Anne and her husband, Peter Threadgill, throw in celebration of their new union. Peter attempts to take over Louisiana and in the violence, Quinn is injured. Peter is ultimately killed and Sookie then returns to Bon Temps.

==== All Together Dead ====
Sookie agrees for the benefit of Sophie-Anne to listen to the thoughts of humans at The Summit, attended by powerful vampires. Sophie-Anne is accused of killing her husband, though Sookie knows that she is innocent. Sookie discovers a bomb planted outside of the Louisiana suite and warns Sophie-Anne. At Sophie-Anne's trial Sookie helps to prove that Sophie-Anne's accusers are being manipulated. Sophie-Anne's child, Andre Paul, forces Sookie to exchange blood with him to try to tie Sookie to Sophie-Anne. Eric exchanges blood with Sookie to prevent Sookie being tied to Andre. This exchange with Eric causes Sookie to become more closely bonded to Eric. Sookie and fellow telepath Barry Horowitz, who met previously in Dallas, learn that multiple bombs have been planted in the hotel by the Fellowship of the Sun. Sookie and Barry help to get some humans and vampires free before the bombs detonate. Sookie and Barry discover that if they hold hands their telepathy is magnified and by doing this they help find humans buried in the rubble. Sookie finds Andre alive but Quinn stakes him to stop his intentions to use Sookie. Sophie-Anne escapes but loses her legs. Sookie rescues Eric, Pam and Bill.

==== From Dead to Worse ====
Sookie learns that boyfriend Quinn is missing. Sookie also finds that she is part fairy after having discovered that her grandmother had had two children with a half-fairy. While her grandfather is dead, her great-grandfather Niall Brigant, who is a fairy prince, wants to meet her. Sookie discovers that a pack of werewolves has begun killing the Shreveport pack and is entangled in a brief war between the two, with the Shreveport pack winning and Alcide its leader. Felipe de Castro, vampire king of Nevada, kills Sophie-Anne and all of the vampire sheriffs of Louisiana except Eric, who surrenders. Sookie learns that her blood bond with Eric allows her to detect his feelings and to know his location. Quinn has become Felipe's prisoner in exchange for his help in recapturing Quinn's mother, who has escaped from a were sanatorium. Sookie reunites with Eric. Jason's wife, Crystal Norris, is unfaithful to him so, as werepanther tradition dictates, Crystal's uncle Calvin must have his hand broken by Sookie. Sookie stops speaking to Jason. Sookie rescues Felipe, Eric and Sam from Sigebert. Sookie visits Hadley's son, Hunter Savoy and discovers that he is a telepath.

==== Dead and Gone ====
The Louisiana town of Bon Temps—along with the rest of the world—is about to be rocked with some big supernatural news: like the vampires before them, the Were people—humans with the ability to change into animals—are about to reveal themselves to humanity. Telepathic barmaid Sookie Stackhouse is apprehensive about the revelation, given the way some people in the small town revile anyone with extraordinary powers, including Sookie herself. While the initial announcement seems to go over smoothly with most people, tragedy strikes when Sookie's sister-in-law, a werepanther, is found murdered and nailed up on a cross. Jason is the prime suspect, but Sookie has even bigger problems to deal with when she learns that a vicious fairy prince is determined to kill her.

==== Dead in the Family ====
Eric's maker, Appius Livius Ocella, arrives, bringing his other vampire child Alexei Romanov with him. Bill, who sustained silver poisoning while rescuing Sookie, refuses to ask any of Lorena's other vampire children for help so that his health will continue to worsen. Victor Madden who wants Eric, Bill and Pam dead, sends assassins after Sookie, Pam and Bill, but the villains are unsuccessful. Claudine's triplet, Claude claims to be suffering from the lack of fairy company after being locked out of the fairy homeland and so begins living with Sookie. Claude identifies that Niall's son, Dermot, and another fairy have been on Sookie's land recently. Sookie contacts Judith Varamon, Lorena's vampire daughter, who heals Bill. Sookie discovers that the unknown fairy previously on her property is Claudine's unborn child's father, Colman. Colman had planned to kill Sookie but decides that he wants her arrested instead. Alexei kills humans uncontrollably before he tries to kill Eric and Pam. Eric kills Alexei; Colman kills Appius; Eric kills Colman. Sookie and Claude free Dermot from a spell under which he had gone mad.

==== Dead Reckoning ====
Sookie asks Amelia to break her blood bond with Eric, which she does. Sookie learns Mr. Cataliades, having given Sookie's grandmother and grandfather some of his blood, is responsible for her telepathic abilities. Sookie sells some furniture to an antiques store where the owner, Donald Calloway, finds a secret compartment containing a letter from her grandmother and an object called a Cluviel Dor. Sookie's grandmother explains that the Cluviel Dor is a magical fairy love object which allows the possessor one wish and that it is now Sookie's. Sandra Pelt, Debbie's sister, hires people to kill Sookie, but they fail to do so. She then holds Sam and girlfriend Jannalyn Hopper at gunpoint, forcing them to take her to Sookie's house. Sookie shoots Sandra before Jannalyn kills her. Sookie, Eric and Pam plot to kill Victor and they succeed.

==== Deadlocked ====
Sookie struggles with what to do with the Cluviel Dor. Niall visits Sookie before taking Claude with him to discover who cursed Dermot. Felipe visits Eric to investigate the disappearance of Victor. At the gathering, Sookie arrives to discover Eric feeding from a woman, Kym Rowe, who is soon found dead on Eric's lawn. Eric's employee, Mustapha Khan is gone when the police arrive. Mustapha visits Sookie where she learns that his friend Warren is being held captive. Freyda, the Oklahoma vampire Queen, plans to make Eric her consort. Donald arrives at Sookie's house demanding that she give him the contents of the furniture she has sold him and then he pulls a knife on her. Mr. Cataliades kills him and informs Sookie that others know of the Cluviel Dor. Bill and Sookie retrieve Colton, whom Felipe has kidnapped, as he was present when Victor was killed. Four werewolves tell Sookie that they will take her to Alcide to identify Warren's body. Mustapha arrives and saves her from the creatures when she realizes that they intend to hurt her. Sookie learns that Jannalyn, who has held Warren captive, had told Mustapha to let Kym into Eric's house. Sookie, Mustapha and Alcide find and save Warren. Claude reveals that he had enlisted Jannalyn to find a werewolf to whom he would then give fairy blood, thus making them irresistible to Eric. Claude hoped that if Sookie were unhappy Niall would be drawn away from Faery. Jannalyn is tried by the Shreveport pack and she fights to the death with Mustapha. Sookie realizes Jannalyn is edging towards Alcide, whom Sookie warns. Alcide moves out of the way and Jannalyn kills Sam. Jannalyn herself is then killed. Sookie uses the Cluviel Dor to resurrect Sam.

==== Dead Ever After ====
Eric progresses with his marriage plans. Sam, Sookie's friend and now co-owner of Merlotte's, is having a hard time dealing with having been suddenly brought back to life. Arlene has been freed from prison and asks Sookie for her job back. Arlene's body is later found, and Sookie is arrested for her murder.

To help her with these issues, Sookie is visited by Desmond Cataliades, Diantha, Barry Horowitz and Amelia Broadway and Bob. Sookie stops by Merlotte's and ends up having sex with Sam for the first time. Sookie tells Sam they must take it slow. She wants to be sure he's not a rebound relationship. Sookie, Sam, Jason and Michele go to Stomping Sally's to dance. Sookie is kidnapped by Johan Glassport, Steve Newlin and Claude Crane. Sookie manages to escape and runs from her kidnappers into the safety of a large group of people from Stomping Sally's, who have chased behind the van in an effort to save Sookie. Claude smashes Steve Newlin's head, who confesses that he and Johan killed Arlene. Johan and Claude are shot dead.

After Jason and Michele get married, Sam drives Sookie home and wants to spend the night. Sookie hopes she and Sam will be still together by Christmas but, if they aren't, she'll know that she will be okay with it.

== In other media ==
The rapper Snoop Dogg, a fan of the tv-show, made a song called "Oh Sookie", inspired by the character.

== Romantic relationships ==
- Sam Merlotte (first season TV series; first novel and last)
- Bill Compton (novel; TV series)
- Eric Northman (novel; TV series)
- John Quinn (novel)
- Ben Flynn/Macklyn Warlow (TV series)
- Alcide Herveaux (novel; TV series)

== Sources ==
- Harris, Charlaine (2011). The Sookie Stackhouse Companion. Gollancz. ISBN 978-0575097148.
