= The Southern Vampire Mysteries =

Book series

- Cover of Dead Ever After
- Dead Until Dark (2001); Living Dead in Dallas (2002); Club Dead (2003); Dead to the World (2004); Dead as a Doornail (2005); Definitely Dead (2006); All Together Dead (2007); From Dead to Worse (2008); Dead and Gone (2009); Dead in the Family (2010); Dead Reckoning (2011); Deadlocked (2012); Dead Ever After (2013)
- Author: Charlaine Harris
- Country: United States
- Language: English
- Genre: Fantasy; Mystery; Gothic; Romance; Southern Gothic
- Publisher: Ace Books
- Published: 2001–2013
- Media type: Print (Hardcover, Paperback) e-Book (Kindle, Nook); Audio Book (CD)

The Southern Vampire Mysteries, also known as The True Blood Novels and The Sookie Stackhouse Novels, is a series of books written by bestselling author Charlaine Harris. The first installment, Dead Until Dark (2001), won the Anthony Award for Best Paperback Mystery in 2001 and later served as the source material for the HBO drama series True Blood (2008–2014). The book series has been retronymed the True Blood Series upon reprinting, to capitalize on the television adaptation.

In The Southern Vampire Mysteries/True Blood Series, Harris develops a detailed mythology and an alternative history scenario in which supernatural beings exist. Not only vampires but also werewolves and fairies exist in this scenario, and a growing public awareness of their presence is part of the plot development. The setting is contemporary, and the stories occasionally reference popular culture.

The series is narrated in first person perspective by Sookie Stackhouse, a waitress and a telepath in the fictional town of Bon Temps in northwestern Louisiana. Harris was originally contracted to write 10 books, but she revealed at Comic-Con 2009 that she had signed a contract for three additional books. On May 14, 2012, Harris' Facebook administrator confirmed that the 13th book, Dead Ever After, would be the final book of the series.

== Novels and short stories ==
=== The Southern Vampire Mysteries (novels) ===
#	Title	Publisher	Release	Length	Hardcover	Paperback
1	Dead Until Dark	Ace Books	May 2001 (paperback); January 2008 (hardcover)	291 pp	ISBN 0-441-01597-2	0-441-00853-4
2	Living Dead in Dallas	Ace Books	April 2002 (paperback); January 2009 (hardcover)	291 pp	ISBN 0-441-01673-1	0-441-00923-9
3	Club Dead	Ace Books	May 2003 (paperback); March 2010 (hardcover)	292 pp	ISBN 0-441-01910-2	0-441-01051-2
4	Dead to the World	Ace Hardcover	May 2004 (hardcover); May 2005 (paperback)	291 pp	ISBN 0-441-01167-5	0-441-01218-3
5	Dead as a Doornail	Ace Hardcover	May 2005 (hardcover); April 2006 (paperback)	295 pp	ISBN 0-441-01279-5	0-441-01333-3
6	Definitely Dead	Ace Hardcover	May 2006 (hardcover); March 2007 (paperback)	324 pp	ISBN 0-441-01400-3	0-441-01491-7
7	All Together Dead	Ace Hardcover	May 2007 (hardcover); March 2008 (paperback)	336 pp	ISBN 0-441-01494-1	0-441-01581-6
8	From Dead to Worse	Ace Hardcover	May 2008 (hardcover); March 2009 (paperback)	359 pp	ISBN 0-441-01589-1	0-441-01701-0
9	Dead and Gone	Ace Hardcover	May 2009 (hardcover); April 2010 (paperback)	312 pp	ISBN 0-441-01715-0	0-441-01851-3
10	Dead in the Family	Ace Hardcover	May 2010 (hardcover); March 2011 (paperback)	311 pp	ISBN 0-441-01864-5	0-441-02015-1
11	Dead Reckoning	Ace Hardcover	May 2011 (hardcover); March 2012 (paperback)	325 pp	ISBN 0-441-02031-3	0-441-02060-7
12	Deadlocked	Ace Hardcover	May 2012 (hardcover); March 2013 (paperback)	336 pp	ISBN 1-937007-44-8	0-425-25638-3
13	Dead Ever After	Ace Hardcover	May 7, 2013 (hardcover); March 2014 (paperback)	352 pp	ISBN 1-937007-88-X	0-425-25639-1
The last novel in the series.
13.5	After Dead: What Came Next in the World of Sookie Stackhouse	Ace Hardcover	October 29, 2013 (hardcover)	208 pp	ISBN 0-425-26951-5	
Alphabetically ordered farewell to all the characters.
n–a	The Sookie Stackhouse Companion	Ace Hardcover	August 30, 2011 (hardcover); 2 October 2012 (paperback)	480 pp	ISBN 0-441-01971-4	1-937007-89-8
A guide to The Southern Vampire Mysteries universe.

=== The Southern Vampire Mysteries (short stories and novellas) ===
#	Title	Original release	Location(s)	Main character(s)
1	"Fairy Dust"	October 2004	Powers of Detection; A Touch of Dead (2009); The Complete Sookie Short Story Collection (2017)	Sookie Stackhouse (narrator)
Introduction of Claudine's brother Claude, and posthumous introduction of their sister Claudette.
2	Dancers in the Dark novella	October 2004	Night's Edge	Sean O'Rourke & Layla Larue Lemay
Introduction of Sean and Layla, later seen briefly in All Together Dead.
3	"One Word Answer"	December 2004	Bite; A Touch of Dead (2009); The Complete Sookie Short Story Collection (2017)	Sookie Stackhouse (narrator)
Introduction of Hadley's death & Mr. Cataliades, Waldo, and Sophie-Anne Leclerq.
4	"Tacky	October 2006	My Big Fat Supernatural Wedding; Blood Sisters:Vampire Stories by Women	Dahlia Lynley-Chivers
Introduction of vampires Dahlia and Taffy, and their husbands Todd and Don.
5	"Dracula Night"	September 2007	Many Bloody Returns; A Touch of Dead (2009); The Complete Sookie Short Story Collection (2017)	Sookie Stackhouse (narrator)
6	"Gift Wrap"	October 2008	Wolfsbane and Mistletoe; A Touch of Dead (2009); The Complete Sookie Short Story Collection (2017)	Sookie Stackhouse (narrator)
7	"Lucky"	December 2008	Unusual Suspects; Between the Dark and Daylight (2009); A Touch of Dead (2009); The Complete Sookie Short Story Collection (2017)	Sookie Stackhouse (narrator), Amelia Broadway
8	"Bacon"	July 2009	Strange Brew	Dahlia Lynley-Chivers
Features the vampires Dahlia and Taffy
9	The Britlingens Go to Hell novella	September 2009	Must Love Hellhounds	Batanya & Clovache
The Britlingens were previously introduced in All Together Dead.
10	"Dahlia Underground"	April 2010	Crimes by Moonlight	Dahlia Lynley-Chivers
Features the vampires Dahlia and Taffy—takes place during All Together Dead and straight after
11	"Two Blondes"	August 2010	Death's Excellent Vacation; The Complete Sookie Short Story Collection (2017)	Sookie Stackhouse (narrator), Pam Ravenscroft
12	"A Very Vampire Christmas"	December 2010	Glamour magazine	Dahlia Lynley-Chivers
13	"If I Had a Hammer"	August 2011	Home Improvement: Undead Edition; The Complete Sookie Short Story Collection (2017)	Sookie Stackhouse (narrator)
14	Small-Town Wedding novella	August 2011	The Sookie Stackhouse Companion; The Complete Sookie Short Story Collection (2017)	Sookie Stackhouse (narrator), Sam Merlotte
15	"Death by Dahlia"	October 2011	Down These Strange Streets	Dahlia Lynley-Chivers
16	"Playing Possum"	September 2012	An Apple for the Creature; The Complete Sookie Short Story Collection (2017)	Sookie Stackhouse (narrator), Hunter Savoy
17	"In the Blue Hereafter"	April 2014	Games Creatures Play; The Complete Sookie Short Story Collection (2017)	Manfred Bernardo (narrator)
18	Layla Steps Up novella	2017	The Layla Collection	Sean O'Rourke & Layla Larue Lemay

=== Chronological order of Sookie-related stories ===
1. Dead Until Dark
2. Living Dead in Dallas
3. Club Dead
4. Dead to the World
  - "Fairy Dust"
  - "Dracula Night"
5. Dead as a Doornail
  - "One Word Answer"
6. Definitely Dead
7. All Together Dead
  - "Lucky"
8. From Dead to Worse
  - "Gift Wrap"
9. Dead and Gone
  - "Two Blondes"
10. Dead in the Family
  - Small-Town Wedding
11. Dead Reckoning
12. Deadlocked
13. Dead Ever After
  - "If I Had a Hammer"
  - "Playing Possum"
  - "In The Blue Hereafter"

== The Sookie Stackhouse Novels' universe ==
=== Vampires ===
Two years before the first novel's timeline (in 2002 according to the Sookieverse timeline), vampires around the world revealed themselves, via television, to the world as actual, and not mythical, beings after the development of a synthetic blood product (the most popular marketed brand of which is called "TrueBlood") that provided adequate sustenance for vampires and therefore did not require them to feed on human blood.

Worldwide, reaction to the vampires' "Great Revelation" is mixed. The policy in Muslim countries is death and torture for vampires, while most African nations, Argentina, and Bosnia refuse to acknowledge vampires' existence. Some nations, such as France, Germany, and Italy, acknowledge vampires and do not torture them, but do not give them equal rights as citizens. Canada, Japan, Mexico, Scandinavian countries, Switzerland, the United Kingdom, and the United States are more tolerant; However, even in the US, vampires are not permitted certain rights like the right to marry.

Rather than acknowledging the legend that vampires are deceased humans who have risen from the dead to prey on the living, the vampires insist they are simply the victims of a medical condition that makes them allergic to sunlight and affects their dietary needs.

Vampires are pale and cold, possess unfathomable strength and speed, and have keen senses of hearing, smell, and vision. This makes it easy for them to protect themselves. They can also remain completely still, expressionless, and silent. Vampires can control the minds of humans ("glamor", often seen as a form of hypnosis) by staring into a human's eyes and speaking in a soothing, trance-inducing voice. Vampires can induce complete or partial amnesia in a glamored human, and can compel them to do anything the vampire desires. A few vampires can even fly; others may have other powers and abilities.

Vampires' fangs come out when they are hungry, see blood, are sexually aroused, or need to fight. All vampires are compelled to obey their makers. Harris' vampires do not age. They can survive and recover from most forms of physical injury, but they will die if stabbed by a stake, exposed to sunlight, burned by fire, completely drained of their blood (if not treated promptly), or decapitated. Silver is highly toxic to them. Unlike the vampire mythology of other universes, Harris' universe states that crucifixes do not affect vampires, garlic only produces allergic reactions, vampires can be photographed, and most (except the "very old ones") can enter places of worship or step on "holy ground". They cannot enter a home unless invited, and if an invitation is withdrawn, they are physically unable to remain on the premises. Since vampires can persuade humans to invite them to enter their homes, humans must avoid eye contact and order the vampire off the premises when an unfriendly one tries to gain entry.

Fangbangers, the human cult followers fascinated by vampires, include volunteers willing to be bitten to provide fresh blood nourishment to vampires. If a vampire and a human share blood (each drinking from the other), it will form a blood bond, linking the pair's psyches. Vampire blood without exchange is sought after by humans as a drug that can enhance strength, heal wounds, and increase attractiveness, among other desirable effects. Due to the shortage of willing vampire donors, human "drainers" attack vampires and drain their entire blood supply, either staking the vamps or leaving victims to die in the sun. The blood is then sold as a drug, in vials on the underground market. It can be highly addictive, but may cause psychotic or murderous rampages by human users upon first use; it is highly unpredictable who will be affected in this manner. In "One Word Answer", a vampire's blood given to a dead body, in combination with magic words, raises the ghost of the body's former inhabitant.

Though many vampires in this universe try to live among humans, they remain very secretive about their organization and government. The vampires divided the continental United States into four divisions (clans), each represented by a symbol: the Whale, the Feather, the Thunder Bolt, and the Eye. A division consists of multiple kingdoms, each controlled by a single lead vampire known as the King or Queen. Each kingdom is subdivided into areas (formerly known as fiefdoms), each controlled by a sheriff who owes allegiance to the monarch.

=== Weres and shapeshifters ===
Weres and shapeshifters can assume either human or animal forms, and are collectively referred to as the "two-natured". A variety of different types of weres and shapeshifters exist in The Southern Vampire Mysteries, including werefoxes, werepanthers, weretigers, werewolves, etc. Being bitten by a were can transform a person unwillingly at full moons into a man/beast form closer to that of classic legend, but a person must be bitten several times to accumulate growth. Shapeshifting conditions manifest in puberty.

As Sam tells Sookie, shapeshifters can assume the form of any animal, but most often change to the same animal every time, usually a creature they have a special affinity for, and they call themselves by that animal, e.g., werebat or weredog.

In contrast, weres are only able to shift into one animal (werebats, werelynxes, werepanthers, weretigers, or werewolves). Within the two-natured community, the capitalized term "Were" is reserved only for those who can change into wolves. The Weres consider themselves superior to all others, but they all cooperate. Most of the two-natured beings organize themselves into packs; a packmaster leads each pack.

Although vampires announced their existence to the world, the two-natured beings maintained their secrecy to observe the vampires' results. In this series of mythology, the shifters decide to publicize their existence in the ninth book, Dead and Gone (2009).

=== Vampire blood ===
Demand for vampire blood has been growing on the black market, as the blood is very powerful and addictive. The strength of the blood depends on the age of the blood (the time since it has been removed from its owner), the age of the vampire from whom the blood has been removed, and the individual chemistry of the drug user.

In this universe, the effects of vampire blood on humans are feelings of power, increased strength, acute vision and hearing, increased sexual desire, and enhanced physical appearance. The results are notoriously unpredictable and vary per person, lasting from weeks to months. Some people go mad—even homicidal—when the blood hits their systems. Vampires hate drainers and the users of the drained blood. A vial of blood can cost from $200 to $400, depending on the age of the vampire and the preference of the seller.

=== Humans ===
In The Southern Vampire Mysteries, humans reactions to vampires are varied.

- "Fangbangers" are vampire groupies who enjoy having sex with vampires and being bitten, perhaps consuming vampire blood, or just like the excitement of being around vampires.
- "Drainers" are humans who attack vampires to drain their blood, though it is a hazardous job. Drainers travel in teams, singling out vampires through a variety of methods and then carefully planning their ambush. They bind vampires with silver chains and drain the blood into vials.
- Some humans have not accepted vampires as creatures of God, and organizations such as the Fellowship of the Sun are against vampires and their existence.

=== Fairies ===
In The Southern Vampire Mysteries universe, fairies "...are your basic supernatural being. From us come elves and brownies and angels and demons. Water sprites, green men, all the natural spirits... all some form of fairy." —Claudine

Fairies are portrayed in the series as beautiful, with pointed ears and glossy, thin skin. Physically, fairies are superhumanly strong and durable. They are tough, ferocious, and incredibly long-lived, but not immortal. The Shreveport werewolf pack master says, "They love to flirt with disaster, they love to role-play." In this universe, fairies are extremely attractive to humans as well as to vampires. Vampires have a hard time resisting fairies because of their smell and taste; fairy blood is intoxicating to vampires. A fairy, Claudine, is first introduced in Dead to the World. Watching vampires react to her, Sookie thinks that "it was like watching cats that'd suddenly spotted something skittering along the baseboards." This makes face-to-face interactions between them all but impossible. However some individuals, such as Sookie's great-grandfather Niall Brigant, can "suppress their essence", effectively masking their scent and making such contact safer.

In the Southern Vampire Series, fairies can be killed with either lemons, limes, or iron. When a fairy dies, a corpse is not left, just a sparkling powder (or fairy dust); the body just fades away, and the fairy's spirit goes to the next oldest family member to tell them of their death. The fae calls their afterlife "The Summerlands".

Fairies are secretive about their race, customs, interactions, and world. They normally inhabit the fae world, named Faery, but there are portals and doorways between it and the human world. Sookie's great-grandfather Niall is a fairy prince, and Claudine and Claude are Niall's grandchildren. In later books, Claudine admits that she is Sookie's fairy godmother. She was assigned this role to move on to the next level, which is angelhood.

Sookie's great-grandfather is over 1000 years old, and her half-human great-uncle is centuries old. Those who have fairy blood in them but are not full-blooded fairies are immune to the effects of iron, lemons, and limes, while maintaining some of the attractive qualities of fairies. Niall states that Sookie and Jason have both inherited the beauty of the fairies, but only certain creatures can tell they are part-fairy. As a genetic quirk (possibly due to fairy blood), Jason greatly resembles his great-uncle to the point where others are unable to differentiate between the two of them. Sookie appears to have inherited more magical fairy powers (such as immunity against mind spells from vampires and maenads), while Jason only has the power of attraction and seduction. However, most assume this is mainly due to his physical appearance. It is also stated in one of the books, by Mr. Cataliades, that Sookie's telepathy is not a trait she obtained from her fairy blood. Sookie's telepathy is demonic in origin, specifically, Mr. Cataliades granted it to anyone of Sookie's grandmother's bloodline born with an "essential spark" or openness to the supernatural world, mixed his blood with In the short story "Fairy Dust", Sookie says Fairies love attention and admiration, a fact she learned from Sam. In this story, it is also implied that Fairies can cast spells, as Claudine was muttering something under her breath to hypnotize or calm down the people she and her brother, Claude, were interrogating. Claudine also magically appeared to aid Sookie when she was in mortal danger on several occasions, however, she hinted that there were limits to how and when she could perform that trick. Sookie was not always aware of her fairy godmother's timely interventions.

It is also known that fairies can conjure objects, demonstrated by Claudine in "Fairy Dust", when she summoned a contract, and in Dead to the World, when she changed her outfit magically. A fairy, Preston, also displays the ability to shapeshift and to seduce even Sookie, who is usually telepathically resistant to such abilities.

=== Telepaths ===
Telepaths are humans who can read the minds of other humans and feel the emotions of different creatures that are portrayed in a creature's "brain signature". Vampires have a "hole" as their signature, so telepaths cannot read their minds. (However, Sookie occasionally picks up a few flashes of thought from vampires.) Were and shifter signatures portray emotions or colors. Demons' signatures are compared to a buzzing sound or like the "static in a radio station". Maenads' signatures are represented as an endless mystic chant. Fairies (and a few powerful witches) can block their minds from telepaths. Sookie refers to their minds as being "shielded".

Telepaths are rarely encountered in the supernatural community. It is revealed in Dead Reckoning that Sookie's power of telepathy was granted to her family by the half-demon Desmond Cataliades. He was great friends with Sookie's half-fairy grandfather Fintan, and so he became a sponsor to Fintan's descendants and was required to give them a gift. He had the power of telepathy and thought it a great gift to Fintan's family, as it would give them an edge over their fellow humans to know what other people were thinking and planning. Fintan and Adele drank Cataliades' blood (although Adele was tricked into it, as Cataliades mixed it with her wine), and from then on Fintan and Adele passed on to most of their descendants the power of telepathy. However, Cataliades revealed, that only the descendants who, like Sookie's grandmother Adele, had the essential spark would inherit the telepathy. When asked what the essential spark was, Cataliades responded, "It isn't easy to pin down in terms of your DNA. It's an openness to the other world. Some humans literally can't believe there are creatures in another world besides ours, creatures who have feelings and rights and beliefs and deserve to live their own lives. Humans who are born with the essential spark are born to experience or perform something wonderful, something amazing." Although Adele had the essential spark Fintan did not want her to have the gift. When each Stackhouse child was born Cataliades came and inspected them to see if they had the gift.

=== Wiccans and witches ===
In The Southern Vampire Mysteries canon, a witch practices magic rituals, drawing from a power most people never tap into that can be focused for various effects through the use of rituals and spells. A Wiccan, on the other hand, practices a pagan religion that follows the ways of the Mother. Practitioners can be both Wiccan and a witch, or more one or the other. Witches and Wiccans first appear in the fourth book, Dead to the World. Sookie's colleague and fellow barmaid at Merlotte's, Holly, is a Wiccan practitioner, but not a witch. In later books, Sookie learns more about witchcraft and befriends Amelia Broadway, a true witch, in New Orleans.

=== Others ===
- Britlingens: Extremely powerful and skilled beings from another dimension who act as mercenaries, considered to rival vampires in strength. Summoning Britlingens requires an exorbitant amount of money, but once summoned they are very difficult to kill.
- Devils: Beings that can corrupt human souls and even buy them. Devils only make deals at crossroads, they are very tricky and have no empathy. The contract must be signed with the blood of the person who sells their soul to the devil (not to be confused with "the Devil", who rarely appears "above ground"). In return, the devil will grant that person their dearest wish. Devils look very human, except for their very sharp teeth and dark red eyes. They are able to possess humans and other supes (referred to in Dead Ever After); they can also appear out of thin air. They may have other powers which have not been revealed so far. Devils and demons tend to cross paths once in a while, but it has not been made clear whether or not these two species are related to each other. If so, that would make devils a type of fae, although this is not explicitly stated.
- Fae Creatures: As noted above, the world of faery in this universe includes "fairies, nymphs, water sprites, angels, elves, pixies, goblins, and brownies", with fairies being the majority and base race:
  - Demons: Beings that have very sharp teeth and are tricky to kill. They can manipulate fire (referred to in Dead and Gone), run faster than any human or animal (referred to in Dead and Gone), and generate a very powerful, burning touch (referred to in Dead as a Doornail). They also possess the power of telepathy (referred to in Dead Reckoning) and can shapeshift (referred to in Deadlocked). Some, if not all, demons can perform magic. Mr. Cataliades was able to pass on his telepathy to Sookie's family by mixing his blood with her grandparents' wine. When they die, the earth does not take the body in nor does it decompose, so it has to be burned (referred to in Definitely Dead).
  - Angels: These fae beings were never seen in the book series and were only referenced infrequently. It is known that faeries can become angels under certain circumstances. Claudine was attempting to become an angel and part of that transformation was to act at Sookie's fairy godmother. Angelic powers are unknown.
  - Elves: Very little is known about these creatures. It is expressed in the short story "Two Blondes" that they have very sharp teeth and their blood is poisonous to vampires. If elf blood is ingested, it will greatly weaken and disorient a vampire for a short period of time. In "Two Blondes", Sookie shoots Rudy, a half-elf, in the face and chest, but he is not mortally wounded. This implies elves are very durable supernaturals and may potentially be more dangerous than others previously introduced. Another short story, "A Very Vampire Christmas", demonstrates that elves are highly combative and that some like to eat human children alive. Bellanos the elf says there are not many of them left. Their hair appears to be pelt-like.
  - Goblins: Little, broad in appearance, and strong creatures whose touch burns the skin when they are angry. (referred to in Club Dead).
- Maenads: In Greek mythology, a maenad is a female follower of the Greek god Dionysus. In the series universe, however, a maenad is a creature whose blood is corrosive to vampires. In Harris' universe, maenads are rare "ancient creatures" of the supernatural community that are divinely powerful, immortal, and chaotic neutrals. They can control any creature through madness and demand tribute. When they rave they go on rampages, and sometimes tear humans and animals to shreds. They can be cannibalistic at times.

== Television adaptation ==
The HBO series True Blood is loosely based on the Sookie Stackhouse novels. Sookie is portrayed by Academy Award–winning actress Anna Paquin.

== See also ==
- Characters of The Southern Vampire Mysteries
