= Bozeman (surname) =

Bozeman is a surname. Notable people with the name include:

- Bradley Bozeman (born 1994), American football center
- Cedric Bozeman (born 1983), American basketball player
- Harley Bozeman (1891–1971), American salesman, tree farmer, politician, and historian, member of the Louisiana House of Representatives
- John Bozeman (1837–1867), American pioneer and frontiersman in the American West who helped establish the Bozeman Trail through Wyoming Territory into the gold fields of southwestern Montana Territory
- Phil Bozeman, member in the band Whitechapel
- Swayze Bozeman (born 1998), American football player
- Terry Bozeman, American actor
- Todd Bozeman (born 1963), American college basketball coach
- V. Bozeman (born 1988), American soul singer, record producer and actress
- Victor Bozeman (1929–1986), American television announcer, voice-over artist and actor
- Virgil Bozeman (1912–2007), American politician and lawyer

== Fictitious persons ==
- Marcus Bozeman, a character in True Blood
- Martha Bozeman, a character in True Blood

== See also ==
- Sally Boazman, British radio traffic reporter
- Boseman
