= Bozman =

Bozman may refer to:

- Bozman, Maryland, location in the United States
- Ernest Franklin Bozman (1895–1968), British author
- Ellen M. Bozman (1925–2009), American community activist and politician
- Geoffrey Bozman (1896–1973), English cricketer
- Ron Bozman, American film producer

== See also ==
- Bozeman (disambiguation)
