= Bozeman (disambiguation) =

Bozeman, Montana is an American city.

Bozeman may refer to:

- Bozeman (surname), including a list of people with the name
- Bozeman Pass, a mountain pass situated east of Bozeman, Montana
- Bozeman Trail, an overland route connecting the gold rush territory of Montana to the Oregon Trail

== See also ==
- Boseman, a list of people with the surname
- Bowsman, Manitoba, Canada, an unincorporated urban community
