= Boseman =

Boseman is a surname. Notable people with the name include:

- Benjamin A. Boseman (1840–1881), American doctor and legislator in South Carolina
- Chadwick Boseman (1976–2020), American actor and screenwriter
- Julia Boseman (born 1966), American politician

== See also ==
- Bozeman (disambiguation)
- Bowsman, an unincorporated urban community in Manitoba, Canada
