= Virgil Bozeman =

American politician and lawyer

Virgil Fackney Bozeman, Jr. (June 6, 1912 – March 9, 2007) was an American lawyer and politician.

Born in Fort Smith, Arkansas, Bozeman moved with his family to Moline, Illinois. Bozeman graduated from Moline High School and served in the United States Army Air Forces during World War II. Bozeman went to University of Illinois, University of Iowa, and Augustana College. He received his law degree from Southern Methodist University Law School and taught law at the law school. He practiced law in Dallas, Texas and then moved back to Moline, Illinois where he continued to practice law. Bozeman served in the Illinois House of Representatives in 1949 and 1950 and was a Democrat. He died at the Fairview Baptist Home in Downers Grove, Illinois.
