= List of True Blood characters =

The following is a list of characters for True Blood (2008–2014), the American television fantasy horror drama HBO series, created and produced by Alan Ball. The series is based on The Southern Vampire Mysteries by Charlaine Harris.

== Cast ==
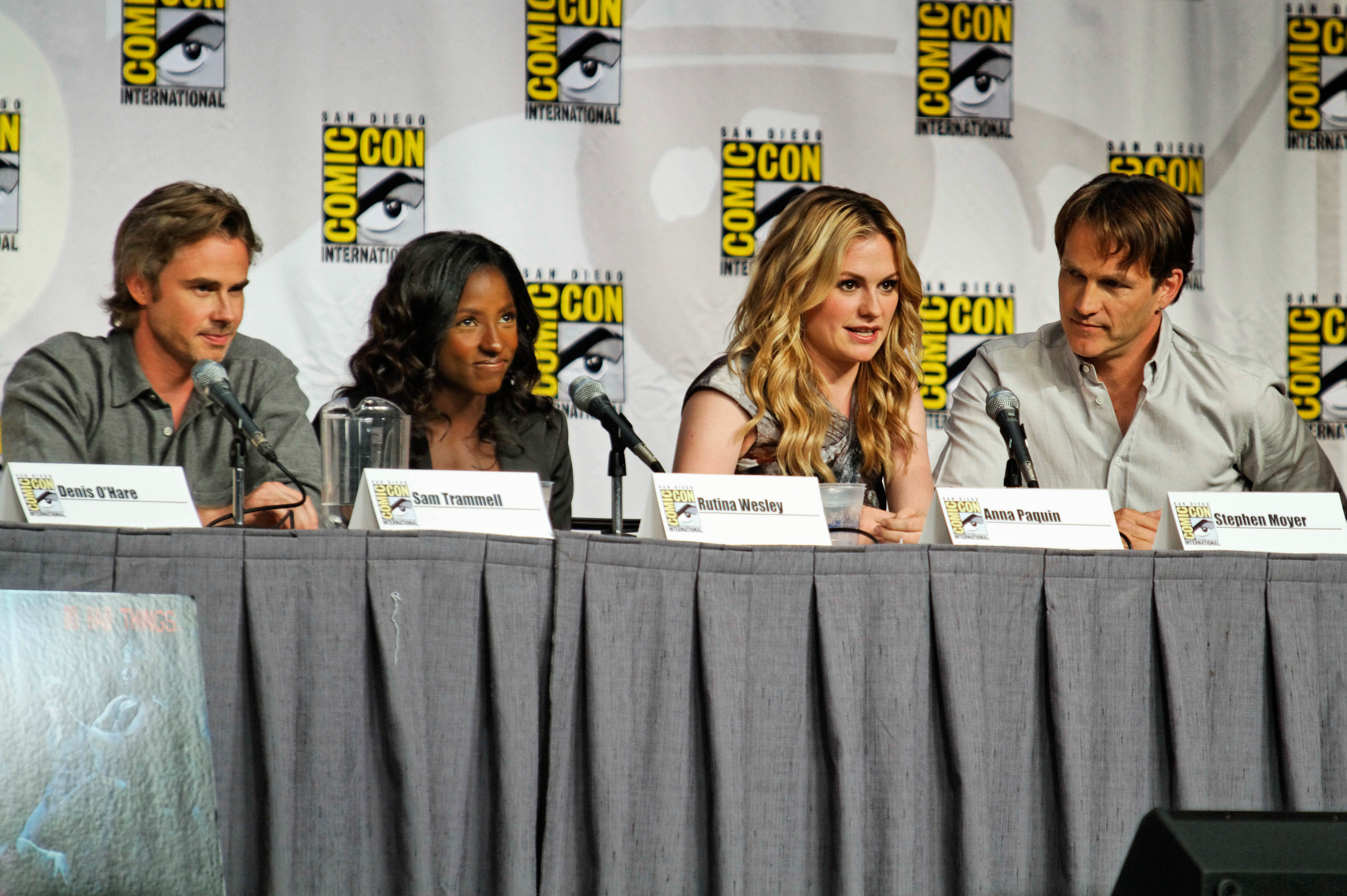
True Blood panel at the 2010 international Comic-Con, featuring (from left to right) Sam Trammell, Rutina Wesley, Anna Paquin, and Stephen Moyer.

=== Main cast ===
The following actors appear in four or more seasons as main cast members.

Actor	Character	1	2	3	4	5	6	7
Actor	Character	2008	2009	2010	2011	2012	2013	2014
Anna Paquin	Sookie Stackhouse	Main (Note: In seasons one and five, Sookie Stackhouse is portrayed by Zenali Turner in flashback scenes. Young Sookie is also portrayed by Lilac Emery-Haynes in season seven.)	Main	Main	Main	Main	Main	Main
Stephen Moyer	Bill Compton	Main	Main	Main	Main	Main	Main	Main
Sam Trammell	Sam Merlotte	Main (Note: In seasons one and two, Sam Merlotte is portrayed by Martin Spanjers in flashback scenes.)	Main	Main	Main	Main	Main	Main
Ryan Kwanten	Jason Stackhouse	Main (Note: In season one, Jason Stackhouse is portrayed by Labon Hester in flashback scenes.)	Main	Main	Main	Main	Main	Main
Rutina Wesley	Tara Thornton	Main (Note: In seasons one, two, and five, Tara Thornton is portrayed by Avion Baker in flashback scenes. In the seventh season, young Tara is portrayed by Layla Crawford and Dara Iruka. Actress Brook Kerr portrayed Tara in the unaired pilot episode.)	Main	Main	Main	Main	Main	Main
Nelsan Ellis	Lafayette Reynolds	Main	Main	Main	Main	Main	Main	Main
Jim Parrack	Hoyt Fortenberry	Main	Main	Main	Main	Main		M
Chris Bauer	Andy Bellefleur	Main	Main	Main	Main	Main	Main	Main
Carrie Preston	Arlene Fowler Bellefleur	Main	Main	Main	Main	Main	Main	Main
Alexander Skarsgård	Eric Northman	Main	Main	Main	Main	Main	Main	Main
Todd Lowe	Terry Bellefleur	R	Main	Main	Main	Main	Main	SG
Deborah Ann Woll	Jessica Hamby	R	Main	Main	Main	Main	Main	Main
Kristin Bauer van Straten	Pam Swynford de Beaufort	Recurring	Recurring	Main	Main	Main	Main	Main
Lauren Bowles	Holly Cleary			R	Main	Main	Main	Main
Joe Manganiello	Alcide Herveaux			R	Main	Main	Main	Main

=== Regular and recurring cast ===
Actor	Character	1	2	3	4	5	6	7
Michael Raymond-James	Rene Lenier / Drew Marshall	M		Special Guest	Special Guest			
William Sanderson	Sheriff Bud Dearborne	Main	Main	Main		SG		
Lynn Collins	Dawn Green	M						
Lois Smith	Adele "Gran" Stackhouse	M			SG			SG
Adina Porter	Lettie Mae Daniels	M	Recurring	Recurring	Special Guest	Special Guest	Special Guest	M
Lizzy Caplan	Amy Burley	M						
Stephen Root	Eddie Fournier	M	SG					
Mehcad Brooks	"Eggs" Benedict Talley	G	M					
Anna Camp	Sarah Newlin		M				Main	Main
Michelle Forbes	Maryann Forrester	R	M					
Michael McMillian	Reverend Steve Newlin	R	M	Special Guest	Special Guest	Main	Main	M
Jessica Tuck	Nan Flanagan	R	G	R	M			SG
Mariana Klaveno	Lorena Krasiki	G	Main	Main		G		
Evan Rachel Wood	Queen Sophie-Anne Leclerq		R	M	SG			
Marshall Allman	Tommy Mickens			Main	Main			
Kevin Alejandro	Jesús Velásquez			Main	Main	R		
Denis O'Hare	Russell Edgington			M		M		
Lindsay Pulsipher	Crystal Norris			M	R			
Janina Gavankar	Luna Garza				Main	Main	SG	
Fiona Shaw	Marnie Stonebrook				M			
Scott Foley	Patrick Devins				SG	M		
Lucy Griffiths	Nora Gainesborough					Main	Main	
Christopher Meloni	Roman Zimojic					M		
Valentina Cervi	Salome Agrippa					M		
Rutger Hauer	Niall Brigant						M	SG
Arliss Howard	Governor Truman Burrell						M	
Kelly Overton	Rikki Naylor					R	M	
Robert Patrick	Jackson Herveaux					R	M	SG
Rob Kazinsky	Macklyn Warlow						M	
Jurnee Smollett-Bell	Nicole Wright						Main	Main
Amelia Rose Blaire	Willa Burrell						R	M
Gregg Daniel	Reverend Daniels			Guest	Guest		G	M
Aaron Christian Howles	Rocky Cleary					G	R	M
Noah Matthews	Wade Cleary					G	R	M
Bailey Noble	Adilyn Bellefleur						R	M
Luke Grimes	James Kent						R	
Nathan Parsons	James Kent							M
Karolina Wydra	Violet Mazurski						R	M
Tara Buck	Ginger	G	Recurring	Recurring	Recurring	G	R	M

== Main characters ==
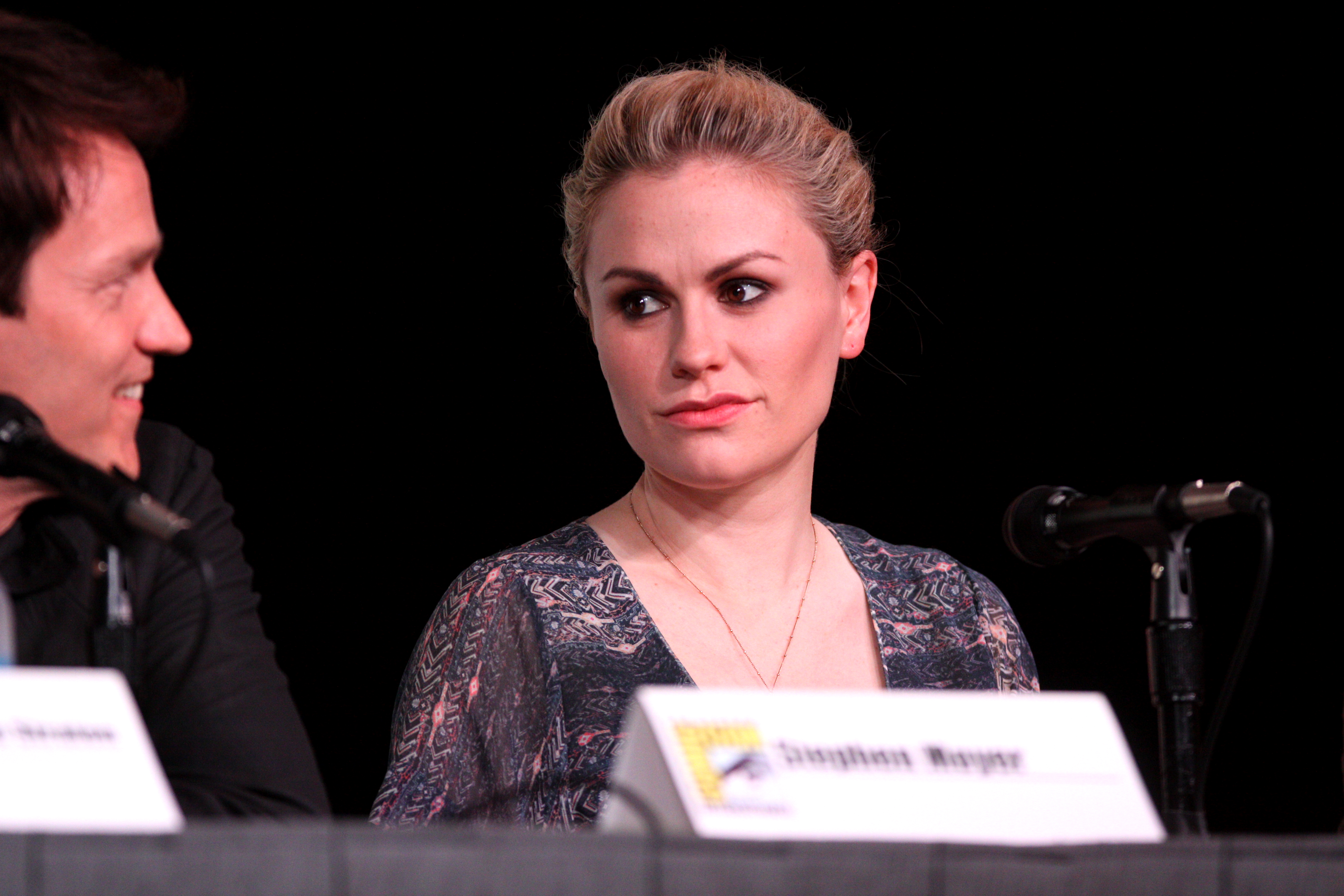
Anna Paquin plays Sookie Stackhouse, the lead protagonist.

=== Sookie Stackhouse ===
Sookie (portrayed by Anna Paquin) is a telepathic waitress in a small-town restaurant. Because of her ability, she has difficulty forming lasting human relationships. She becomes involved in a romantic relationship with a vampire, Bill, upon discovering that she can't read his mind. This relationship with a supernatural being causes controversy amongst the residents of her small town. In Season 3, it is revealed she is part faerie, a supernatural race thought to have been driven to extinction by vampires for their blood’s granting the ability to walk in the sun.

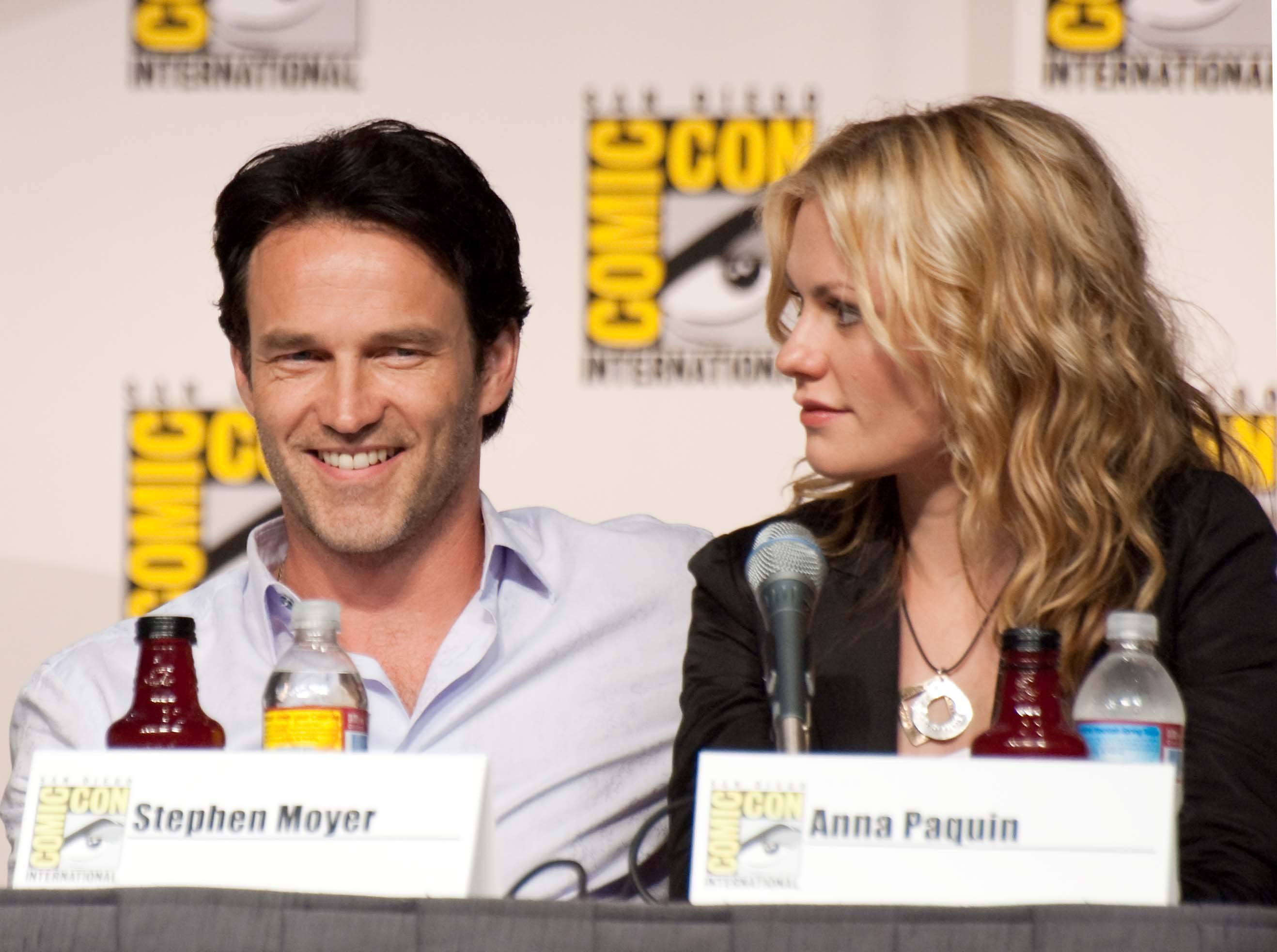
Stephen Moyer and Anna Paquin in July 2009.

=== Bill Compton ===
Bill (portrayed by Stephen Moyer) is a vampire romantically involved with Sookie. Turned into a vampire against his will during the American Civil War, Bill shows more compassion for human life than many other vampires. He is outwardly expressive of his emotions and holds onto memories of his past human life—behaviors that are unique amongst his vampire peers.

=== Sam Merlotte ===
Sam (portrayed by Sam Trammell) is the owner of the establishment where Sookie works. During the first season, Sam is characterized by his adoration and loyalty towards Sookie. When Bill Compton becomes romantically involved with her, he openly disapproves of their relationship. Despite his initial support of vampire rights, Sam feels as though vampires and humans should be kept separate regardless of their equality. Sam is a shapeshifter and is often seen watching over Sookie in the form of a dog. He is the first supernatural introduced to the series who isn't a vampire.

=== Jason Stackhouse ===
Jason (played by Ryan Kwanten) is Sookie's not-too-bright, self-involved brother, who is vigilant in defending and protecting Sookie. He supervises a road crew during the day and is known for bedding the women of Bon Temps at night. During the first season, he is the prime suspect in the murders of four women, all of whom have a connection to him. After the death of his vampire blood-addicted girlfriend Amy, Jason believes that he must be responsible for the murders. He is then recruited by the Fellowship of the Sun, an anti-vampire church, who approve of what they believe to be his crime of killing "fangbangers" (i.e. people in sexual relationships with vampires).

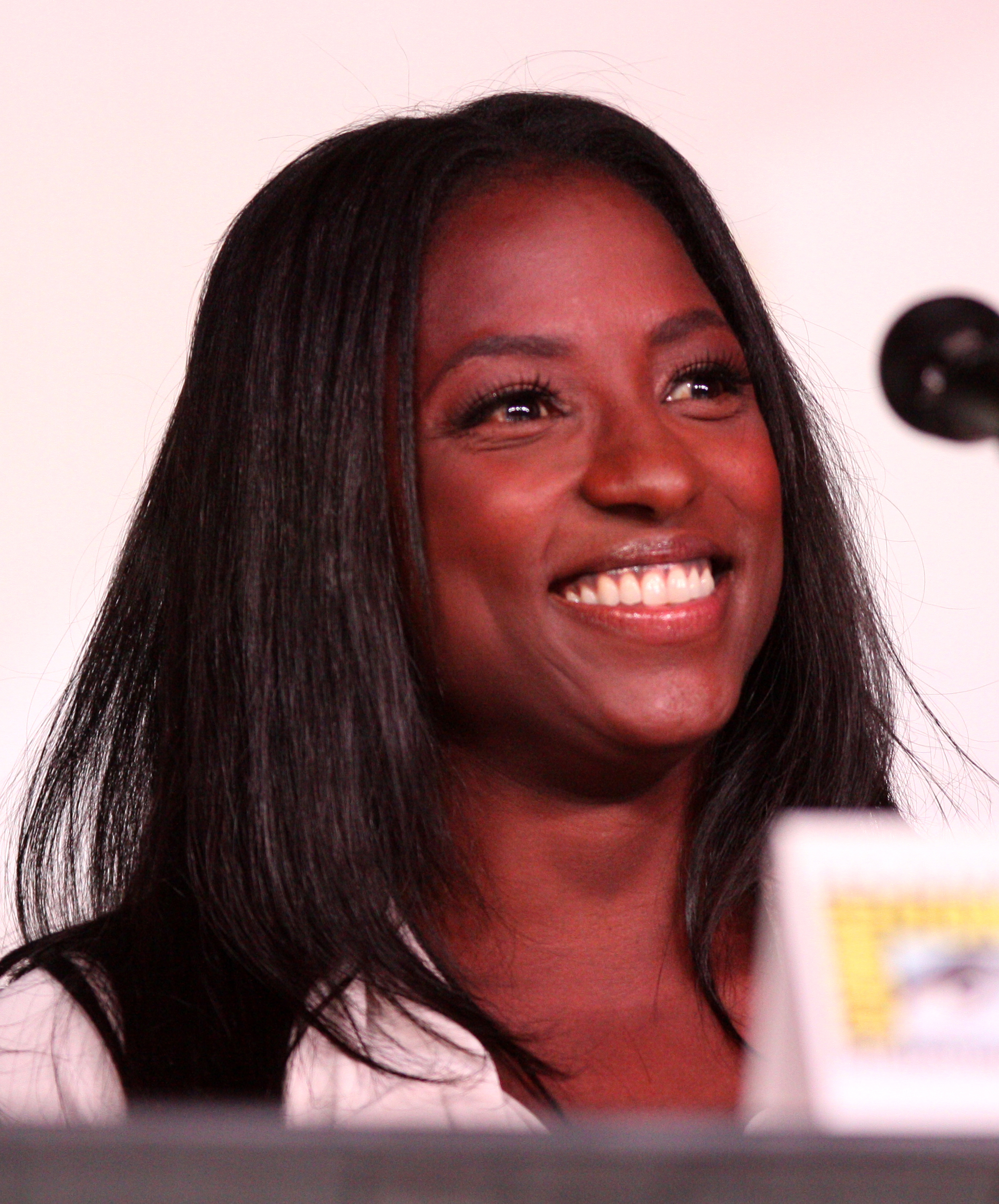
Rutina Wesley played Tara Thornton.

=== Tara Thornton ===
Tara (portrayed by Rutina Wesley) is Sookie Stackhouse's best friend. She grew up with an alcoholic, abusive mother, resulting in trust issues and social difficulty. As a child, Tara bonded with Sookie's older brother, Jason, after he protected Tara from her mother. From then on, Tara developed an unreciprocated love for Jason.

As an adult, Tara is candid, distant, and struggles to keep a job until she starts bartending at Merlotte's. She has a brief friends with benefits relationship with Sam Merlotte in the first season.

Tara provides care for her mother, Lettie Mae, even paying for her mother to receive an exorcism from "Miss Jeanette" to cure her alcohol addiction. After this appears successful, Tara for a second exorcism. Miss Jeanette turns out to be a pharmacist in a nearby town running a scam; Lettie Mae relapses. In the second season, Tara falls under the maenad Maryann’s influence, leading to a relationship with Eggs (Benedict), who is later shot dead by Jason while confessing to murders Maryann forced. Heartbroken, Tara attempts suicide in Season 3 but is thwarted by her cousin Lafayette.

Tara is then abducted by a delusional vampire who plans to turn her. She escapes by drinking his blood for strength, smashing his skull, but not killing him. Jason eventually kills the vampire at Merlotte's. Traumatized upon discovering that Jason killed Eggs, Tara cuts her hair and leaves Bon Temps.

In the fourth season, Tara moves to New Orleans. She works as a cage fighter and is in a relationship with another fighter, Naomi. In the season finale, Tara is shot in the head by Debbie Pelt. To save her life, Pam turns her into a vampire at Sookie and Lafayette's insistence, causing a severe personality change due to the brain damage. Tara and Pam became close in the fifth season, with Tara deeply caring for her maker. She rescued Pam from the Vampire Authority, sharing a kiss. Tara is killed early in the seventh season by a Hep V vampire while protecting her mother.

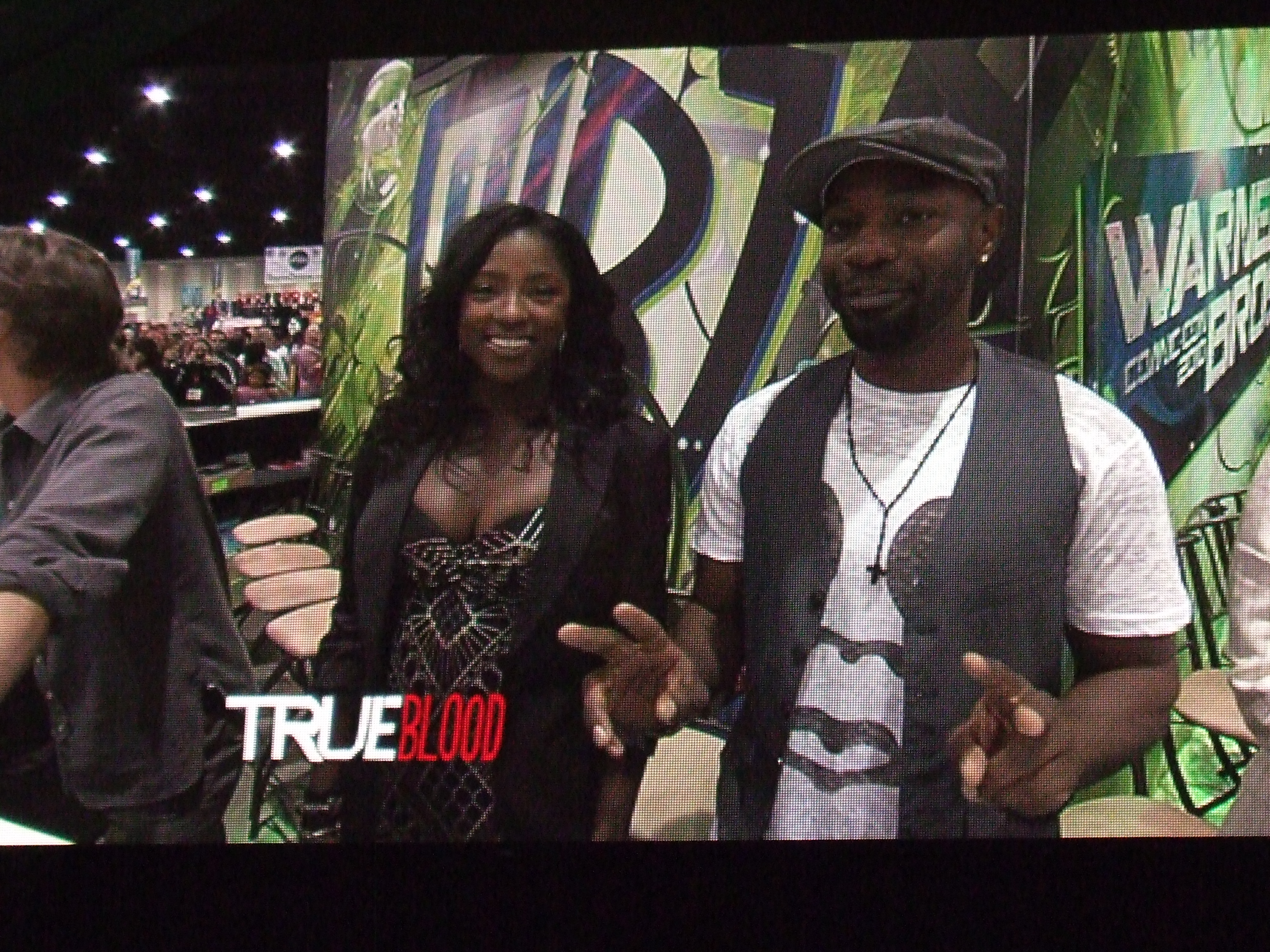
Rutina Wesley and Nelsan Ellis (right) at a True Blood signing event at Comic Con in 2010.

=== Lafayette Reynolds ===
Lafayette (portrayed by Nelsan Ellis) is a short-order cook, drug dealer, and Tara Thornton's cousin in Bon Temps. Unlike the novels, where Lafayette is killed in the second book, fan demand led to his expanded role in the show.

Openly gay, Lafayette is largely accepted in Bon Temps. In the first season, when homophobic patrons sends back his burger (claiming that "it might have AIDS"), Lafayette confronts them directly: "Faggots been breeding your cows, raising your chickens, even brewing your beer long before I walked my sexy ass up in this motherfucker. Everything on your goddamn table got AIDS." He beats them up, to the delight of other guests in the restaurant.

Showrunner Alan Ball worried about casting a "phony" portrayal of Lafayette's sexuality. Actor Nelsan Ellis based the character's mannerisms on his mother and sister. Ellis found the elaborate costuming key to the role, noting: "I have more makeup on than any of the females in the cast. Once they get me with the fake eyelashes and the eye makeup, I listen to some Rihanna and I'm there."

Lafayette initially dealt vampire blood (also known as "vampire juice" or "V"). This leads to his torture by Eric in Season 2, before he is ordered to sell it again by the Queen in Season 3. His romantic interest, Jesús Velásquez, is a brujo and nurse for Lafayette's mentally ill mother, Ruby Jean (played by Alfre Woodard). In Season 4, Lafayette explores Wicca with Jesús at Marnie Stonebrook's palm reading shop. Marnie (played by Fiona Shaw) is the leader of a Wiccan coven who becomes possessed by a witch seeking revenge against all vampires. Lafayette later discovers that he is a medium. In a tragic turn, Marnie's spirit possesses Lafayette and murders Jesús, consuming his blood and transferring Jesús' inner demon into Lafayette.

Ellis received critical acclaim for his sensitive and complex portrayal of the character. In 2008, he received a Satellite Award from the International Press Academy for best supporting actor in a television series for his role as Lafayette Reynolds. In 2009, he was nominated for a Scream Award for Best Supporting Actor. In 2011, he won the NAACP Image Award for Outstanding Supporting Actor in a Drama Series for his performance in True Blood.

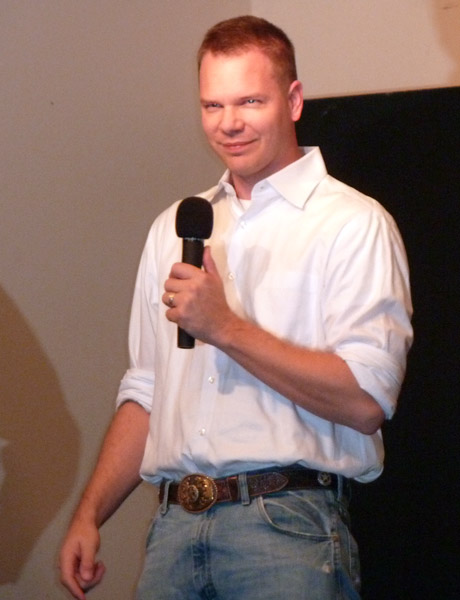
Jim Parrack portrayed Hoyt Fortenberry.

=== Hoyt Fortenberry ===
Hoyt (portrayed by Jim Parrack) is Jason Stackhouse's best friend and fellow road crew worker. Hoyt is initially shy but uniquely unprejudiced against vampires. He enters a serious relationship with the newly turned vampire Jessica. They break up after Jessica attacks his mother, reconcile, but later split when Hoyt, unaware of her feelings for Jason, struggles with their abnormal relationship. Heartbroken after Jessica sleeps with Jason, Hoyt joins a hate group but can't commit to violence, freeing Jessica and calling the police. Fed up, he leaves Bon Temps for Alaska, asking Jessica to glamour him to forget their memories, which she tearfully does. As he leaves town, Jason pulls him over and begs him not to go. Jess's glamour works — Hoyt treats Jason as a stranger. As Hoyt drives off to Alaska, oblivious, Jason breaks down over the loss of his friend. Hoyt later returns for his mother's funeral with a new girlfriend and unknowingly avenges his mother by killing Violet. He and Jessica reunite, rekindle their romance, and marry in the series finale. His Alaskan girlfriend marries Jason.

=== Andy Bellefleur ===
Andy (portrayed by Chris Bauer) is a Bon Temps police detective who is a recovering alcoholic. He investigates the first season's murders, immediately and wrongly suspecting Jason Stackhouse. Suspended in season two, he returns after falsely claiming to have shot Eggs (who the town believes committed Maryann's murders). In season three, he replaces Sheriff Dearborne and reluctantly trains Jason. Mostly resistant to Maryann's influence until her death, he is one of the few who remembers what she did, though his memory is vague due to heavy drinking. Season four reveals his addiction to V and that he and his sister Portia are direct descendants of Bill Compton.

=== Eric Northman ===
Eric (portrayed by Alexander Skarsgård) is the Sheriff of Area 5, a vampire district in Louisiana. He is over 1,100 years old and is a powerful and wealthy member of the vampire community. Eric runs the vampire bar, Fangtasia, in Shreveport, and develops an interest in Sookie Stackhouse after discovering her unique ability to read minds during the first season.

=== Arlene Fowler Bellefleur ===
Arlene (portrayed by Carrie Preston) is a waitress at Merlotte's. Arlene is a four-time divorced single mother of two. She is good-hearted but bigoted toward vampires, outwardly disapproving of Sookie and Bill's relationship. In the first season, she gets engaged to Rene, who is secretly a serial killer. Sookie later kills Rene in self-defense when he attacks her. In the second season, she dates Terry Bellefleur but discovers she is pregnant with Rene's baby. Fearing the child will be a killer, Arlene unsuccessfully attempts to have a miscarriage. Terry accepts the baby, easing Arlene's fears slightly, though she remains convinced her son is evil due to Rene's genetics.

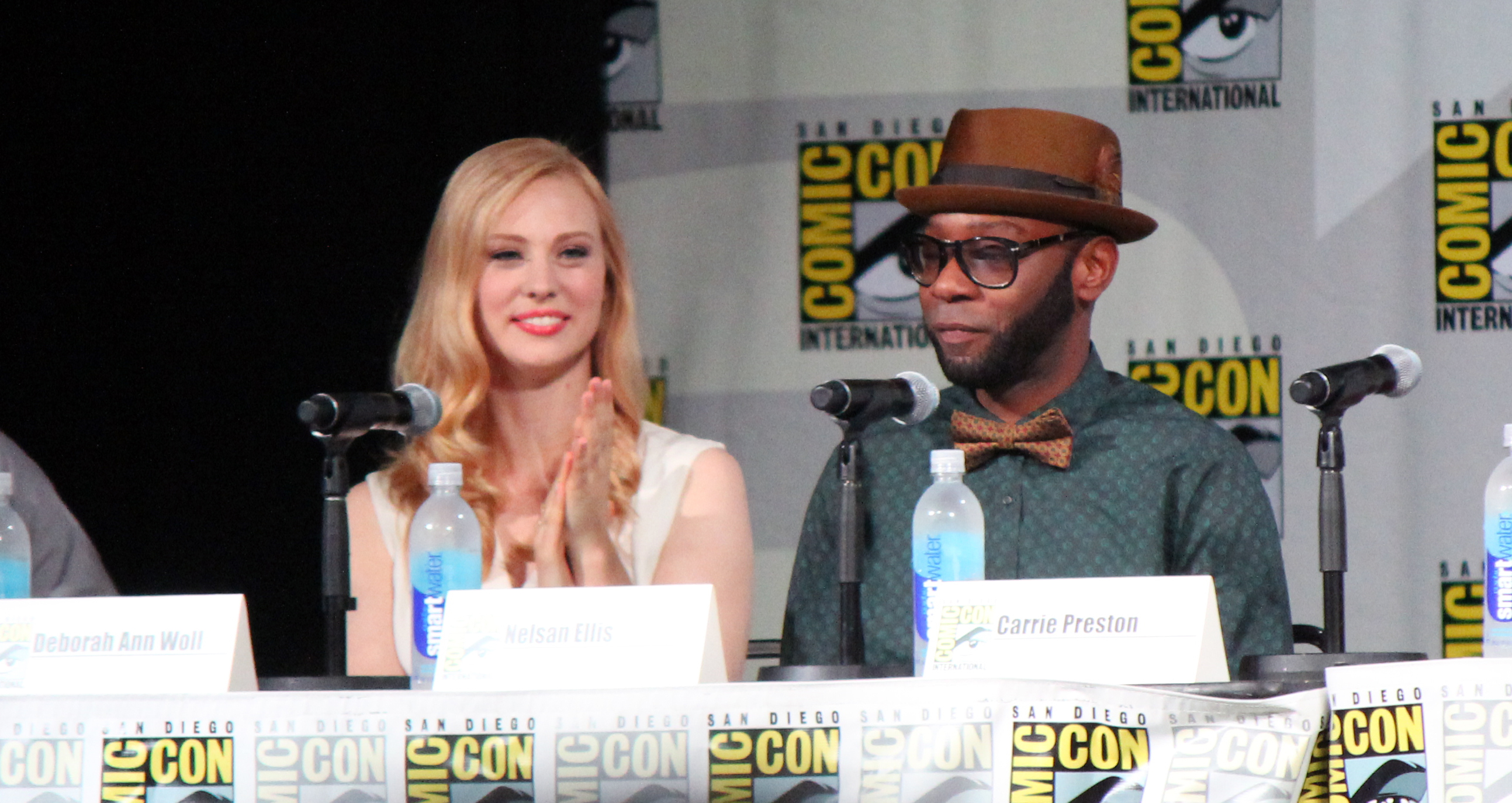
Deborah Ann Woll and Nelsan Ellis at the True Blood panel at the 2014 Comic-Con convention in San Diego, California.

=== Jessica Hamby ===
Jessica (portrayed by Deborah Ann Woll) is a young vampire that Bill is forced to create as punishment for murdering a fellow vampire. Jessica's character is exclusive to the series, not appearing in the Southern Vampire Mysteries.

Thrilled to escape her strict and abusive Christian upbringing, Jessica's petulant attitude strains her relationship with her maker, Bill. Initially living at Fangtasia with Pam and Eric, she was soon returned to Bill due to her frustrating behavior. In Season 2, she dated Hoyt Fortenberry until she attacks his rude mother. After accidentally draining a person in Season 3, she reconciles with Hoyt and eventually moves in with him. He and Jessica reunite and marry in the series finale.

=== Pamela Swynford De Beaufort ("Pam") ===
Pam (portrayed by Kristin Bauer van Straten) was turned into a vampire by Eric Northman about a century before the series, serving as his loyal (though sometimes lazy) assistant and bouncer at Fangtasia. Formerly a San Francisco brothel madame circa 1905, she met Eric while being attacked by a serial killer and was turned after a suicide attempt to avoid a lonely death as a pariah. Cynical and devoted primarily to Eric (later to Tara), she often manages Fangtasia in his absence and once enlisted Lafayette to sell V for Eric.

Throughout the series, Pam displays a strong romantic and sexual preference for women. She is fiercely loyal to Eric, enduring torture by the Magister to protect him. She weeps blood tears when Eric tries to sacrifice himself to burn Russell Edgington. In season four, after the incident with the witches, Marnie curses Pam, causing her face to rot.

In season five, Pam turns Tara into a vampire to save her life. This decision leads to a close romantic relationship by the end of the season. They continue as a couple into season six, showing Pam's care for Tara. When Tara dies in season seven, Pam, initially emotionless while in Morocco, later reveals her sadness and tears to Eric. She and Eric occasionally speak in Swedish.

=== Alcide Herveaux ===
Alcide (portrayed by Joe Manganiello), a werewolf, initially helps Sookie Stackhouse find Bill Compton to repay his father’s debt to Eric Northman. Alcide is handsome and attracted to Sookie. His ex-fiancée, Debbie Pelt (also a werewolf) left him, claiming he wasn't "man enough." After Eric uses Alcide's truck to kill Russell Edgington, Alcide's debt is relieved. In season four, Alcide reconciles with Debbie in Shreveport. He reluctantly joins the Shreveport werewolf pack at her insistence, despite preferring to be a lone wolf. Their relationship strained due to his feelings for Sookie and differing life goals (family, pack involvement). Alcide loses faith in packmaster Marcus Bosman after Marcus kills Tommy Mickens. Alcide and Sam Merlotte team up for revenge.

Alcide kills Marcus by crushing his windpipe after finding him with Debbie, then abjures Debbie. Alcide takes responsibility for Marcus's death to protect Sam and covers for Sookie. He fights his new packmaster, who was working for Edgington and distributing "V." Alcide reluctantly becomes packmaster, which makes him more aggressive. Frustrated by the pack's violence and murder of students, Alcide covers up Nicole Wright's escape. When Rikki confronts him on his lies regarding Nicole and her mother, Alcide defeats his challengers but spares them, leaving werewolf society and befriending Sam again. Alcide and Sookie start a relationship after he supports her at Terry Bellefleur's funeral. Alcide is murdered in Season 7 by a hate group targeting supernaturals.

== Humans ==
=== Rene Lenier/Drew Marshall ===
Rene (portrayed by Michael Raymond-James), the primary antagonist of season one, is introduced as a friendly, respected Cajun co-worker of Jason's in Bon Temps who approves of Sookie dating a vampire. He proposes and gets engaged to Arlene. He is secretly Drew Marshall, a man who fled Bunkie, Louisiana, after murdering his "fangbanger" sister. Under a false identity and trained accent, Rene uses Jason to identify women who have slept with vampires before committing a series of "fangbanger" murders. His psychopathic nature is only revealed when he attacks Sookie, who kills him in self-defense. Arlene, pregnant with his child, is distraught. Rene's ghost later appears in the Season 4 finale to warn Arlene about Terry. He tells her he's met the ghosts of Terry's past and she must run.

=== Terry Bellefleur ===
Terry (portrayed by Todd Lowe) is an Iraq war veteran and cook at Merlotte's. He is Detective Andy Bellefleur's cousin. He is a gentle soul, despite his unusual behavior and clear signs of post-traumatic stress disorder. He is kind to vampire Bill, particularly as a fellow war veteran. He develops a relationship with Arlene in seasons one and two. Their relationship escalates rapidly under Maryann's influence, in spite of Terry’s wishes. In season three, when Arlene reveals her pregnancy with Rene's baby, Terry wants to commit to the child as a parent.

Season five explores Terry’s experience in Iraq when Sgt. Patrick Devins arrives in Bon Temps, claiming their squad is being killed in fires. Terry's unit had brutally killed a local family after a member of their group, Private Eller, shot a teenage boy during an off-duty Fourth of July celebration. Before being killed, the boy's mother cursed them with the Ifrit monster. This incident caused Terry's PTSD. The spirit of the family’s grandmother gives Terry an ultimatum: either he or the captain who ordered the killings must kill the other to lift the curse. Terry intends on a fair fight, but Patrick takes Arlene hostage. Arlene manages to get a revolver to Terry. Despite the sergeant begging Terry to spare him, Terry shoots him. The Ifrit consumes Sgt. Devins body and lifts the curse.

However, Terry remains tormented and hires an old war buddy to kill him after arranging a massive life insurance policy for Arlene. Unaware of the hit, Arlene has a vampire friend glamour Terry into forgetting his Marine service and the assassination attempt. Terry enjoys a brief period of peace before being fatally shot by a sniper outside Merlotte's. Despite Arlene’s misgivings, he is buried with full military honors.

=== Lettie Mae Thornton ===
Lettie Mae (portrayed by Adina Porter) is Tara's abusive, alcoholic mother. After convincing Tara to fund an fraudulent exorcism for a supposed demon causing her addiction, Lettie Mae becomes a devout Christian. In Season 2, she helps Lafayette rescue Tara from Maryann's influence but later holds him and Sookie at gunpoint so Tara can save Eggs. In Season 3, she is oblivious to Tara's suicide attempt and is later discovered having an affair with her church's married reverend, who she eventually marries. She makes a single derogatory comment about her sister's son, Lafayette, calling him a "sexual deviant."

In Season 5, she rejects her newly-turned vampire daughter at Fangtasia. In Season 6, she and Reverend Daniels oversee Terry's funeral and she attempts reconciliation, letting Tara drink her blood. After Tara's death in Season 7, Lettie Mae, distraught, drinks Willa's blood, triggering visions of Tara that cause her to self-harm in order to drink her blood again.

=== Sheriff Bud Dearborne ===
Bud (portrayed by William Sanderson) is the sheriff of Renard Parish and an old friend of Sookie and Jason's deceased parents. While he is well respected in the town of Bon Temps, he goes out of his way to show his distaste for vampires and vocally objects to Sookie's relationship with Bill. He doesn't believe Jason is the murderer in the first season.

Despite the blatant prejudice he shows Bill, he regularly scolds Andy for being unfair and biased in his dealings with suspects. In the second season, he investigates the murders of Miss Jeanette and Daphne. His attempts at identifying and locating their killer is complicated by the outrageous behaviour of Bon Temps' residents while under Maryann's influence. In the third season, Bud resigns after yet another murder takes place and leaves Andy Bellefleur in charge.

In season 5, it's revealed Bud is in a group of assassins after shifters, dating the Dragon of the group named Sweetie Des Arts. When Bud and Sweetie are about to feed Sookie to pigs, the police show up and everyone is put under arrest. Bud resists, however, and is shot by Andy Bellefleur, killing him.

=== Nicole Wright ===
Nicole (portrayed by Jurnee Smollett-Bell) is a co-founder of the Vampire Unity Society (VUS), a group advocating for peace between vampires and humans. She encourages other supernaturals to "come out" after Luna Garza shapeshifts from Steve Newlin back to herself on live TV. When she tries to ally with werewolves, Rikki's pack attacks, killing her friends and boyfriend. Alcide saves her from Rikki. She later begins a relationship with Sam Merlotte and becomes pregnant. Early in Season 7, she is abducted by Hep V vampires but rescued. Fearing for her unborn child, she convinces Sam to leave Bon Temps with her.

=== Reverend Daniels ===
Reverend Daniels (portrayed by Gregg Daniel) is the pastor of one of the churches in Bon Temps and a respected member of the community. In Season 3, he begins a romantic relationship with a seemingly reformed Lettie Mae, and by Season 4, the two are married. He and Lettie Mae are sought out by Arlene and Terry in Season 4 to rid their home of the evil spirits that they believe are targeting their baby, Mikey. In Season 6, he performs the service at Terry's funeral at Arlene's request. Reverend Daniels is also a leading supporter of Sam's decision to pair up humans with vampires in an attempt to ensure mutual protection and security. In Season 7, he offers an aimless Willa the light-proof basement of the church as a place for her stay until she figures out a more permanent living situation.

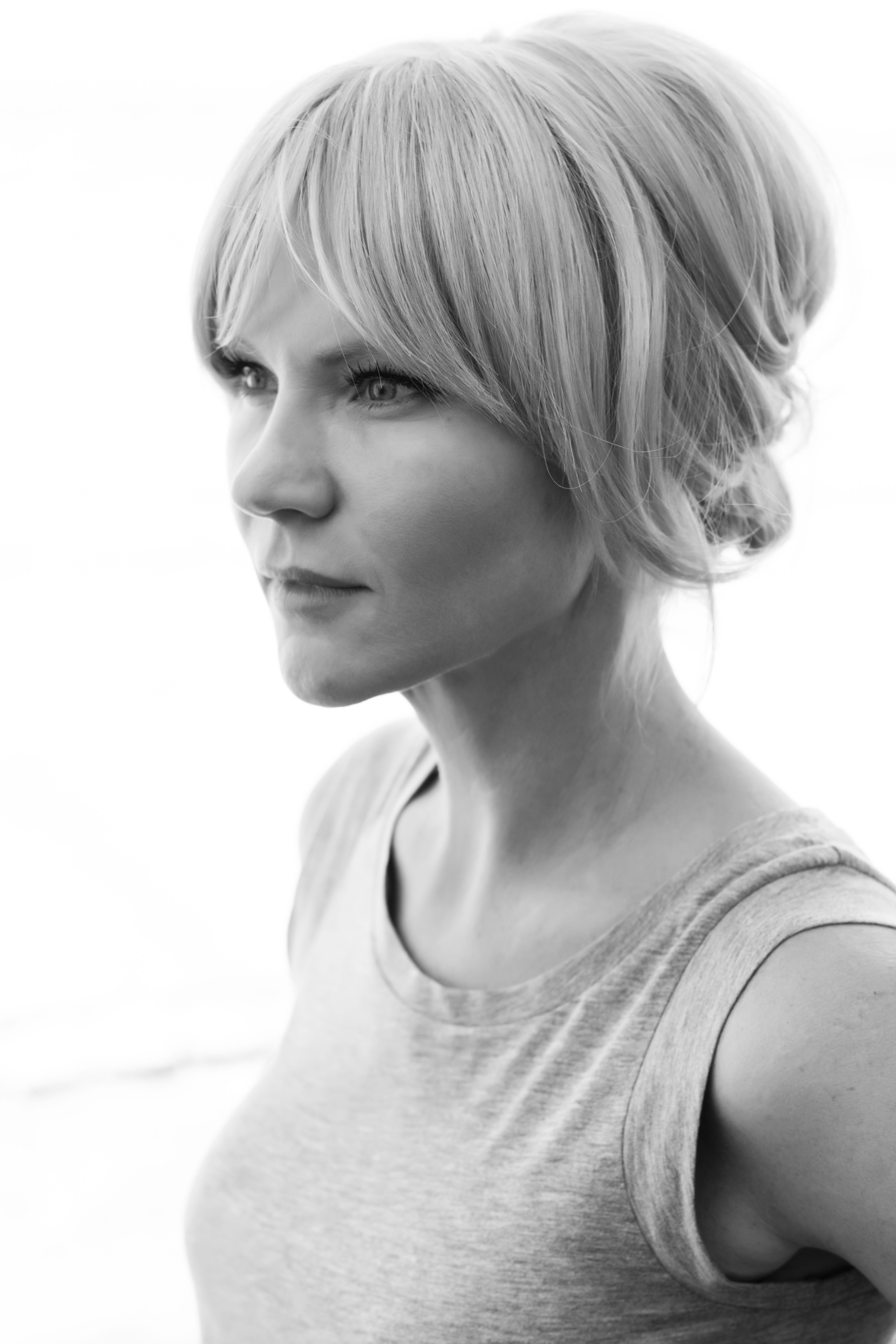
Tara Buck played Ginger in True Blood.

=== Ginger ===
Ginger (portrayed by Tara Buck), a human employee at Fangtasia, first appears in the final episodes of season one. She is known by her shrill, and frequent, screaming. She is obsessed with Eric and fiercely loyal to him and Pam. Sookie shares that, according to her telepathic reading, Ginger is mentally unstable from excessive glamouring. Hearing this, Fangtasia's vampire bartender, Longshadow, attacks and is killed by Bill. Traumatized after witnessing Longshadow's murder, Pam glamours Ginger once again after deciding that further deterioration of her mind is preferable to transforming her into a vampire to ensure her silence.

In season two, Ginger continues to work at Fangtasia despite her unreliability. Under duress, she reveals Lafayette's location to Sookie and allows Sam, Lisa, and Colby Fowler into Fangtasia after Sam bribes her. By season four, her loyalty increased; she comforted Pam and held her in a coffin during Antonia's spell. In season six, Ginger is held at Governor Burrell's vamp camp for unwittingly helping in his daughter's kidnapping to supply food to prisoners until Eric rescues her.

In season seven, Pam reveals that Ginger actually conceived the idea for Fangtasia, which Pam took credit for after glamouring her. Before opening the bar, Ginger worked for Pam and Eric at the video store that they were assigned by the Magister. Ginger was a customer and fan of vampire films. She quickly developed a crush on Eric, which led her to apply for the daytime position. Though it is never made clear when or how she found out that Eric and Pam were vampires, it is implied that she was well aware even before vampires came out of the coffin.

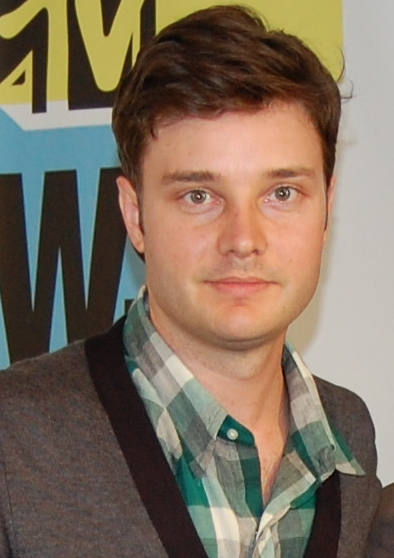
Actor Michael McMilian portrayed Rev. Steve Newlin.

=== Reverend Steve Newlin ===
Rev. Steve Newlin (portrayed by Michael McMillian), the anti-vampire leader of the Fellowship of the Sun, is a key antagonist in season two. He is married to Sarah Newlin. Newlin attempts to publicly burn Eric Northman's maker, Godric, who surrendered to the Church voluntarily. After a failed abduction, Newlin traps Sookie. Godric and other vampires thwart the burning, highlighting their superior humanity. It's revealed vampires killed Newlin's father, the previous church head.

In season three, Newlin calls for vampire deaths after Russell Edgington murders an anchorman on live-air. An interview reveals he is under IRS investigation and going through a divorce. Newlin vanishes for six months and is revealed to be a vampire in the Season 4 finale.

In season five, Newlin announces that he is now a "Proud Gay American Vampire" who has been in love with Jason ever since he joined the Fellowship of the Sun. He replaces Nan Flanagan as AVL spokesperson. After the Vampire Authority falls and Governor Burrell’s anti-vampire movement is set in motion, Newlin is captured by vampire police for study. Eric stops him from feeding on Bill as revenge for Godric and Nora. Sarah Newlin exposes him to sunlight; Steve dies proclaiming his love for Jason. In Season 7, a vision of Steve haunts Sarah.

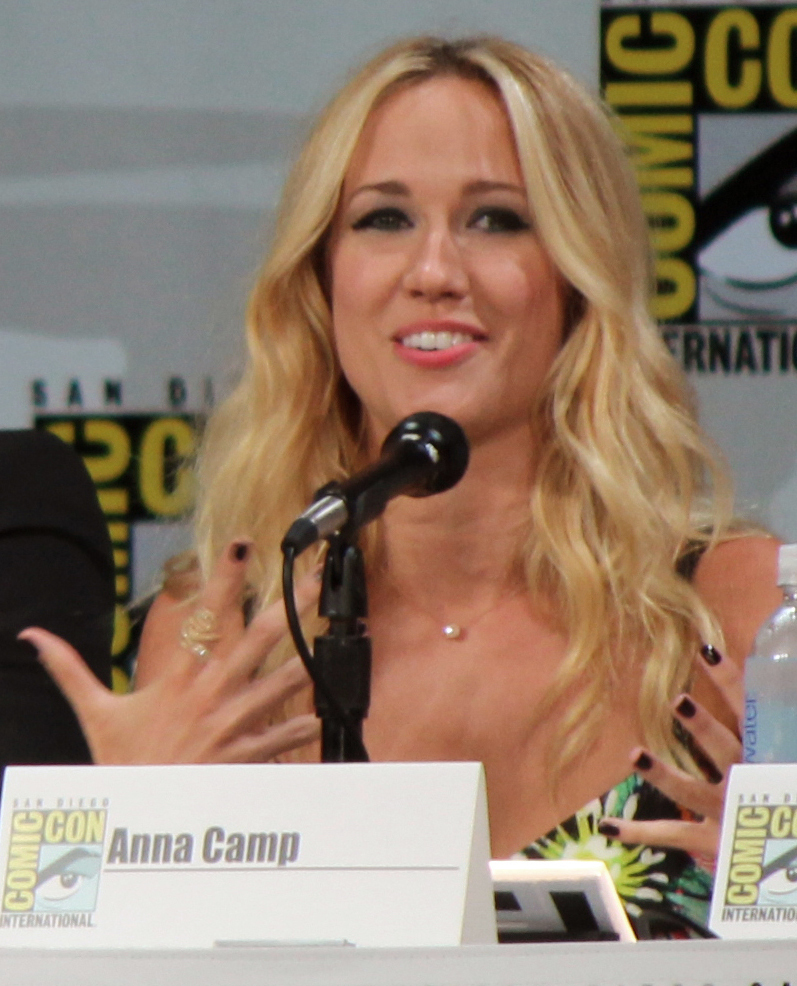
Anna Camp at the True Blood panel at the 2014 Comic-Con convention in San Diego, California.

=== Sarah Newlin ===
Sarah (portrayed by Anna Camp) is the main antagonist of Seasons 6 and 7. Initially a supporter of vampire rights until her sister disappeared, Sarah is a prominent member of the anti-vampire Fellowship of the Sun with her husband, Steve Newlin. She is attracted to Jason Stackhouse, and moves him from the Fellowship camp into her home to be close to him. This leads to an affair. Their relationship ends when Steve suspects Jason has been spying on them after discovering that Sookie is Jason's sister. Sarah disagrees with Steve's extreme anti-vampire methods and can be seen openly arguing with him on live television during an interview with Nan Flanagan after the Godric incident.

Between Seasons 2 and 6, Sarah divorced Steve and wrote a tell-all book. In Season 6, she is revealed as the mastermind behind the human-vampire war and the "Vamp Camps" in collaboration with her lover, Governor Truman Burrell. After Burrell rejects her desire for a child, she resumes a brief sexual relationship with Jason. Following Burrell's death, Sarah assumes full control of the camps, distributing TruBlood tainted with Hepatitis V to slowly kill vampires. She is revealed as the "blonde tyrant" Lilith prophesied.

Sarah assumes ultimate control of the Vamp Camps and their agenda to distribute TruBlood containing "Hepatitis V", a disease that causes vampires to slowly and painfully meet the "true death". Slowly becoming unhinged, Sarah seeks revenge on Jason through experiments on Jessica. After learning the truth of what's inside the TruBlood, several vampires (including Jessica, Pam, Tara, Willa, James, and Steve) all refuse to drink their rations of TruBlood. After killing a Yakonomo Corporation representative looking for the Governor, Eric confronts Sarah and frees the imprisoned vampires. She opens the roof to expose the vampires to the sun before fleeing after a confrontation with Jason, who ultimately lets her go.

In season seven, it is revealed that Sarah has dyed her hair and is living in a commune with a New Age guru. Eric and Pam, along with the Yakuza, track her down. They capture her, wanting to use her blood (which contains the cure for Hep-V) to synthesize and distribute a cure called "New Blood". Eric and Pam double-cross the Yakuza to distribute the New Blood cure themselves. Pam chains the increasingly deranged Sarah in the Fangtasia basement and charges vampires $100,000 to drink her blood. Sarah spends her days being haunted by visions of her dead husband.

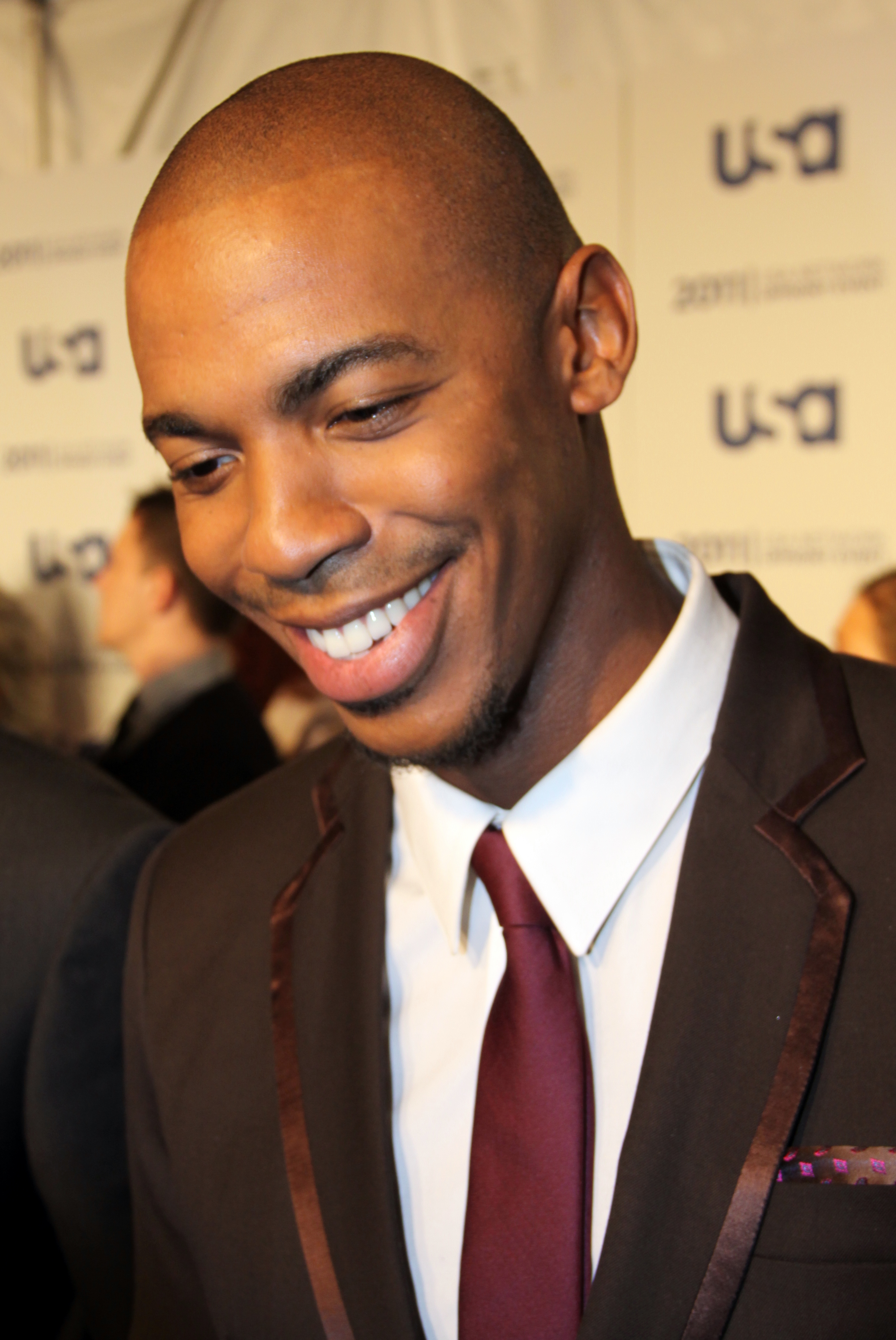
Actor Mehcad Brooks portrayed "Eggs" Talley in True Blood.

=== "Eggs" Benedict Talley ===
"Eggs" (portrayed by Mehcad Brooks) is a companion of Maryann Forrester, a mysterious and nomadic woman who moves to Bon Temps at the end of season one. Eggs develops a romantic relationship with Tara Thornton during the second season, which is secretly manipulated by Maryann. Maryann is an ancient supernatural being able to manipulate human behavior who frequently places Eggs under her influence and compels him to commit horrific acts, including murder and cutting out human hearts.

After Maryann's death, Eggs seeks Sookie's help to regain his memories. With Sookie’s telepathic support, Eggs recalls murdering people on Maryann's orders. Shocked, he confesses to Andy Bellefleur and presents the murder weapon. Jason Stackhouse, mistaking Eggs' actions as an attempt to murder Andy, shoots and kills him.

Eggs' death devastates Tara. The police, however, blame him for the murders Maryann orchestrated. Tara ends her friendship with Sookie after learning that Sookie helped Eggs remember his crimes under hypnosis. They quickly reconcile after Sookie pays for Eggs' funeral.

=== Patrick Devins ===
Patrick (portrayed by Scott Foley) Patrick, an Iraq War veteran and command sergeant, was part of Private Terry Bellefleur's Marine unit. In Iraq, while intoxicated, their unit was involved in a tragic incident on the Fourth of July: Private Eller killed a teenaged boy after misunderstanding an order to "get rid of" him. The boy's family confronts the squad and the squad brutally kills them. Just before Patrick orders Terry to shoot the boy’s mother, she curses them all with the Ifrit monster. The squadron burns their bodies, and Terry, high on drugs, is unsure whether he sees the monster rise from the flames.

Patrick arrived in Bon Temps at the end of season 4, later telling Terry the squad have been dying in mysterious fires. After Lafayette conjures the spirit of the woman Terry killed, Zaafira, she reveals the curse requires one of them to kill the other. The situation ends when Terry shoots Patrick, after Patrick takes Arlene hostage, thus breaking the curse.

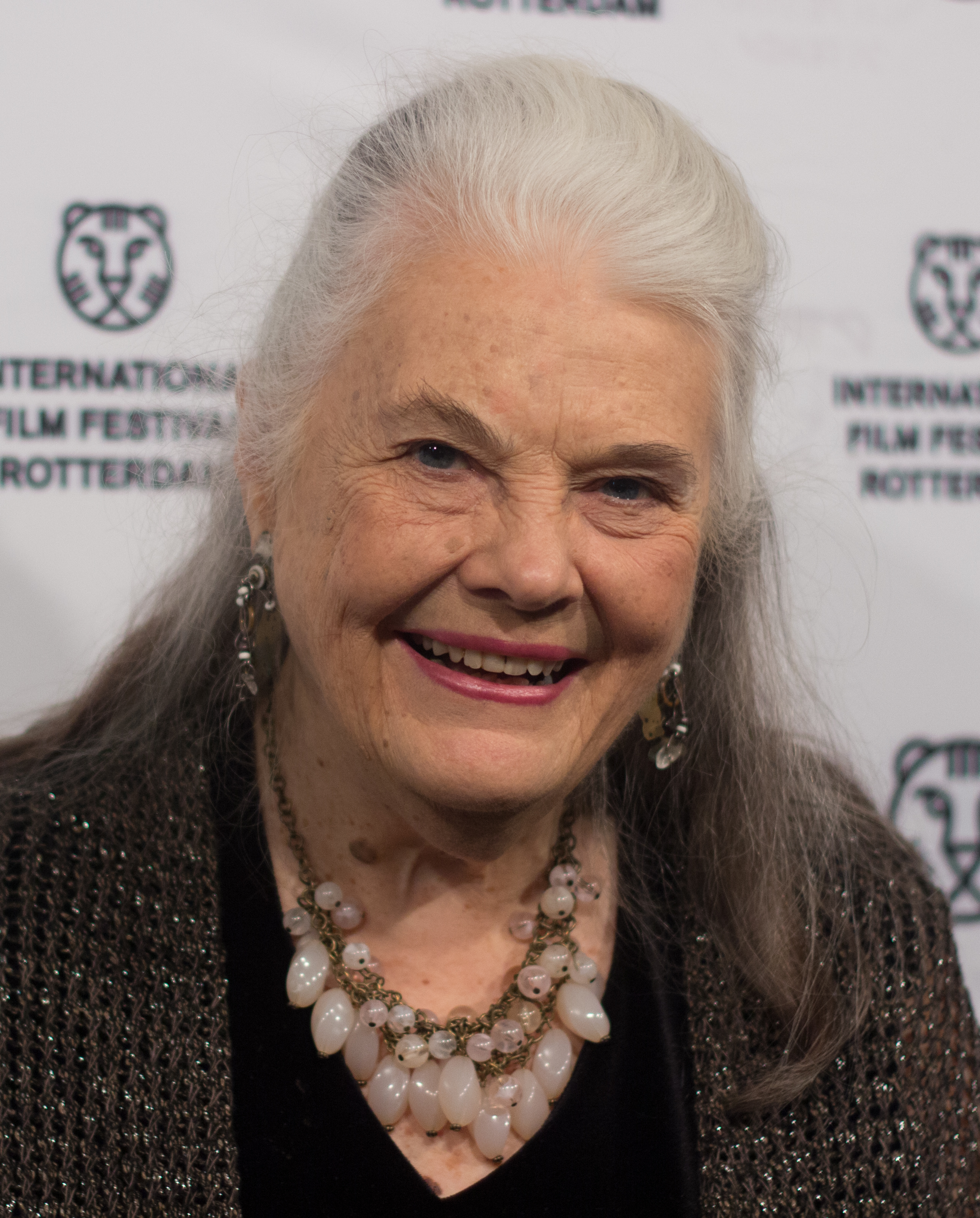
Lois Smith portrayed Adele "Gran" Stackhouse.

=== Adele Stackhouse (née Hale) ===
Adele Stackhouse (portrayed by Lois Smith) is Jason and Sookie's paternal grandmother ("Gran"). She is a presumed widow who raised them after their parents' deaths. Sookie lives with her and later inherits her house. Gran is a very kind, motherly figure, even helping raise Tara Thornton. She supports Sookie's relationship with Bill and is head of the "Descendants of the Glorious Dead," an organization devoted to the Civil War. She is greatly interested in Bill's historic knowledge of Bon Temps. Adele is brutally murdered by Rene Lenier, who broke into the house intending to kill Sookie. Adele had a disowned brother, Bartlett Hale (portrayed by Cheyenne Wilbur), whose pedophilic grooming of Sookie leads Bill to kill him. In the season 4 finale, Adele's spirit appears to take Marnie's spirit out of Lafayette.

=== Governor Truman Burrell ===
Governor Burrell (portrayed by Arliss Howard) is the Governor of Louisiana and the secondary antagonist of season 6. Governor Burrell imposes a vampire curfew after TruBlood factories are destroyed by the Vampire Authority. He also shuts down all vampire businesses and encourages human citizens to arm themselves. Secretly, he continues to synthesize blood production for re-election revenue. Eric Northman discovers Burrell's research facility/prison for vampires, which is developing anti-vampire weapons like silver UV bullets and contact lenses to prevent glamouring. Burrell's deep hatred stems from his wife's affair with a vampire. Empowered by Warlow's blood, Bill Compton decapitates Burrell during an attack on his mansion. Sarah Newlin and other politicians cover up his death, claiming the governor has survived and is operating from an undisclosed location while Sarah makes public appearances on his behalf.

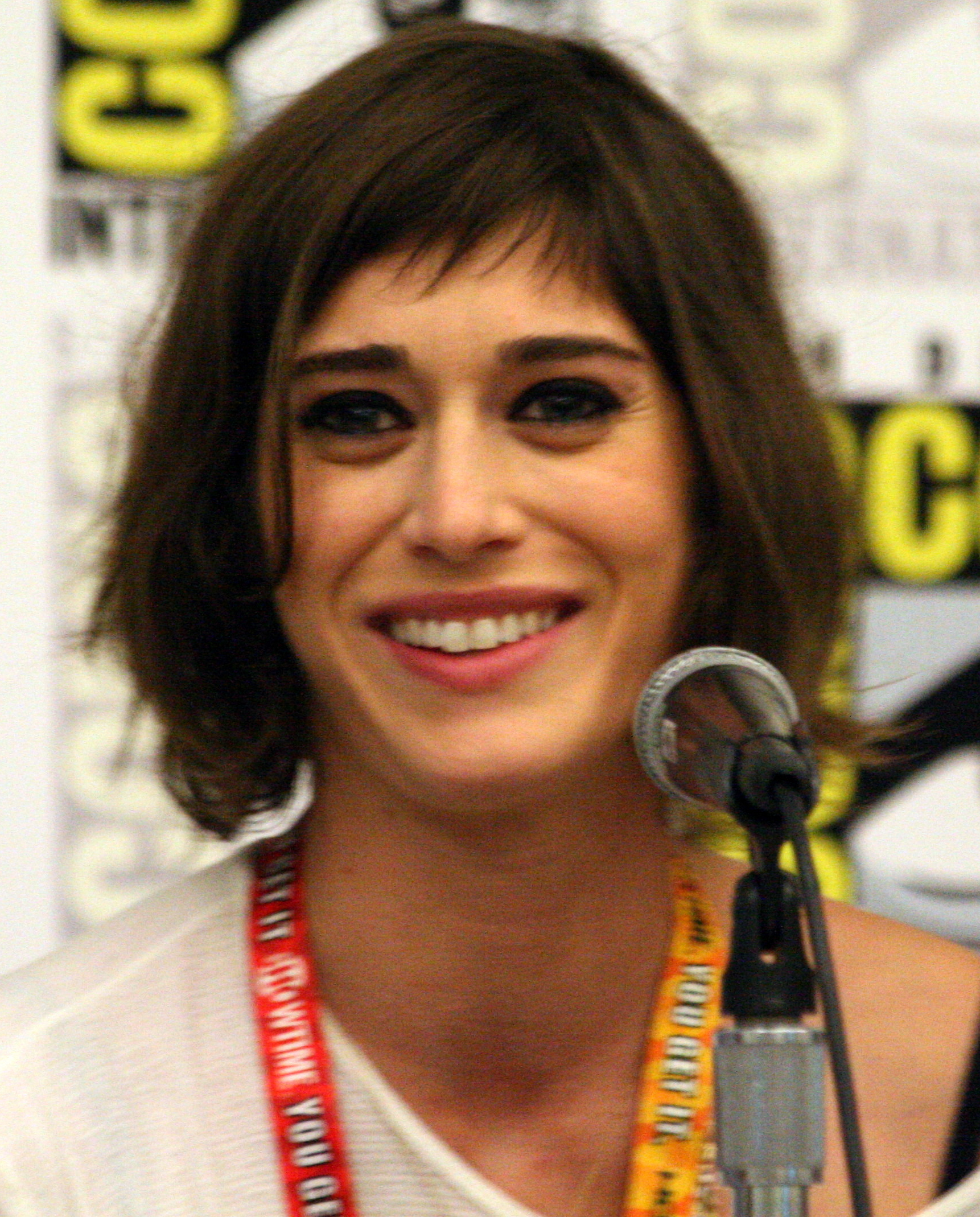
Lizzy Caplan portrayed Amy Burley in True Blood.

=== Amy Burley ===
Amy (portrayed by Lizzy Caplan) is Jason's bohemian, V-addicted love interest. Hailing from Storrs, Connecticut, she meets Jason in the vampire bar Fangtasia. After learning he is looking for more V to use, she comes to his house and uses V together with him. She starts a relationship with Jason, who thinks that she might be "the one," and becomes a waitress at Merlotte's.

When she and Jason run out of V, she orchestrates the abduction of one of Lafayette's vampire clients, Eddie. It becomes apparent she has experience in kidnapping vampires, implying she is a drainer. She and Jason lock Eddie in the basement, but soon Eddie warns Jason that Amy is a psychopath. Jason disapproves of Amy's cruel treatment of Eddie and attempts to free him, but Amy stakes Eddie in reaction, straining her relationship with Jason. Amy promises she and Jason will do only one last trip of V—while they are tripping, she is strangled to death by Rene Lenier.

=== Dawn Green ===
Dawn (portrayed by Lynn Collins) is Sookie's co-worker. She briefly attempts to rekindle her relationship with Jason. When he criticizes her after discovering she slept with a vampire, Dawn forces Jason out of her house at gunpoint. Shortly thereafter, Sookie discovers her strangled body. It is later confirmed she was murdered by Rene Lenier. In the season one episode "Escape from Dragon House", it is revealed that Hoyt Fortenberry had a crush on Dawn, which Sookie discovers while reading the minds of several people at Merlotte's.

== Vampires ==
=== Nan Flanagan ===
Nan (portrayed by Jessica Tuck) serves as the televised spokesperson for the American Vampire League (AVL), presenting vampires as harmless and denying violence against humans. Off-camera, she is aggressive and a high-level bureaucrat within the vampire community. Nan is able to fire sheriffs, like Godric, but monarchs like Sophie-Anne are above her authority. Despite publicly advocating for True Blood, and claiming to drink it exclusively, she privately feeds on a woman in her limousine.

In Season 3, Nan conducts an interview with Eric on behalf of the Authority regarding Russell Edgington, King of Mississippi. She later orders Eric, on behalf of the Authority, to kill Russell.

Nan has a more prominent role in Season 4, after electing Bill Compton as Vampire King of Louisiana to restore a more positive representation of the vampire community. She clashes with Bill during the war against witches, prioritizing popular perception over survival. In the Season 4 finale, she reveals that she knows about the supernatural properties of Sookie's blood. She reveals to Bill and Eric that she has quit both the AVL and Authority and tries to them to help her overthrow the Authority. Bill and Eric refuse. When she threatens Sookie, Eric kills her guards while Bill kills Nan herself.

A mockumentary on the fifth disc of the season one DVDs shows photos of Nan Flanagan with both President Teddy Roosevelt (1858–1919) and Franklin D. Roosevelt (1882–1945). She also appears in a painting by Georges Seurat (1859–1891).

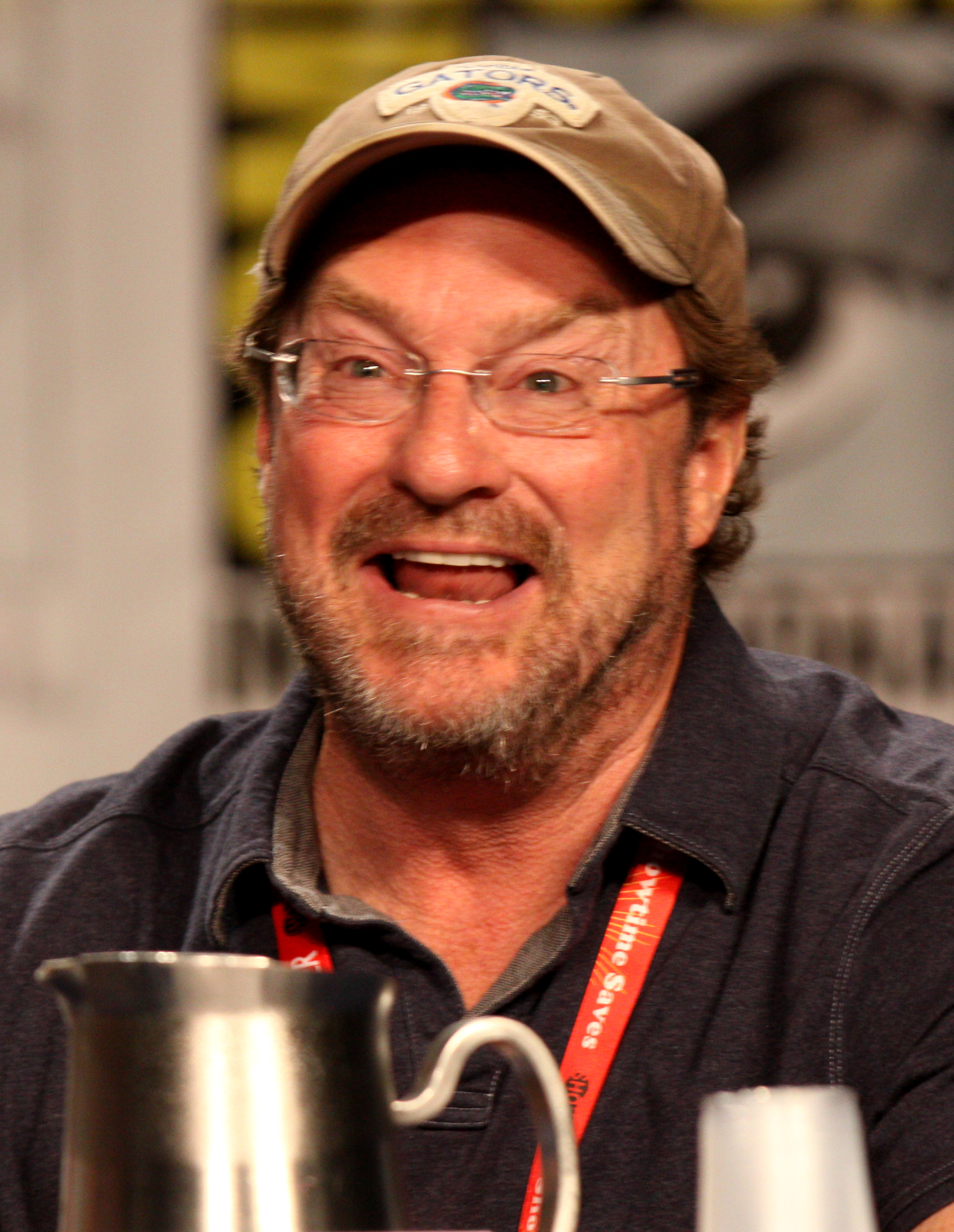
Actor Stephen Root portrayed Eddie Fournier.

=== Eddie Fournier ===
Eddie (portrayed by Stephen Root) is a middle-aged, overweight gay vampire. He is one of Lafayette’s primary sources of vampire blood (“V” or “vampire juice”) during the first season. He became a vampire after his marriage failed, hoping to attract men. However, he continues to live as he did before, spending most of his days at home alone watching television. Eddie appears to be under the illusion that Lafayette is genuinely attracted to him, although Lafayette’s intent is to collect his blood for dealing. Jason and his V-addicted girlfriend, Amy, kidnap Eddie to use as a V reservoir. After a few days, Jason gets to know Eddie and regrets their actions. Amy stakes Eddie before Jason is able to free him. In season two, Eddie briefly appears in Jason's nightmare regarding his mixed feelings about vampires. In season four, a witch named Marnie contacts Eddie's spirit, who tells her he has a rose for a stunned Lafayette.

=== Lorena Krasiki ===
Lorena (portrayed by Mariana Klaveno) is the vampire who “made” Bill. She is first introduced in a Civil War-era flashback when Bill, exhausted and near death, sought refuge in her cabin. She pretends to be a widow, tries to seduce him and, when refused, attacks him before eventually turning him. Lorena becomes emotionally dependent on Bill and turns him into a crazed killer; they torture and drain humans, often having sex while their victims bleed to death. Bill eventually regrets his actions, forcing her to release him and leaving her.

Bill and Lorena reunite 70 years later, in Season 2, when Eric summons her to Texas to hold Bill captive while Sookie infiltrates the Fellowship of the Sun. Despite her intensified longing, Bill eventually escapes by hitting Lorena with a plasma TV. After Godric is freed from the Fellowship of the Sun, Lorena confronts Sookie at Godric’s party. The two fight over Bill, but Lorena is stopped by Godric who comments on her old age and lack of meaningful change. He then orders her to leave his domain. She begrudgingly departs after an emotional goodbye to Bill.

Lorena returns in Season 3 as a guest in Russell Edgington’s mansion after Bill was captured. Bill initially attacks her, engulfing her in flames, but she survives. Though Bill resists her advances at first, the two end up having violent sex; he breaks her neck, twisting her head around, in order to avoid eye contact during their encounter. Bill subsequently ends his relationship with Sookie to protect her from Lorena. Eventually Bill's deception becomes apparent, and she resolves to kill him. She spends a lengthy and emotional time torturing him before allowing werewolves to feed on his blood. When Sookie escapes to save Bill, Lorena attacks her but Sookie stakes and kills her.

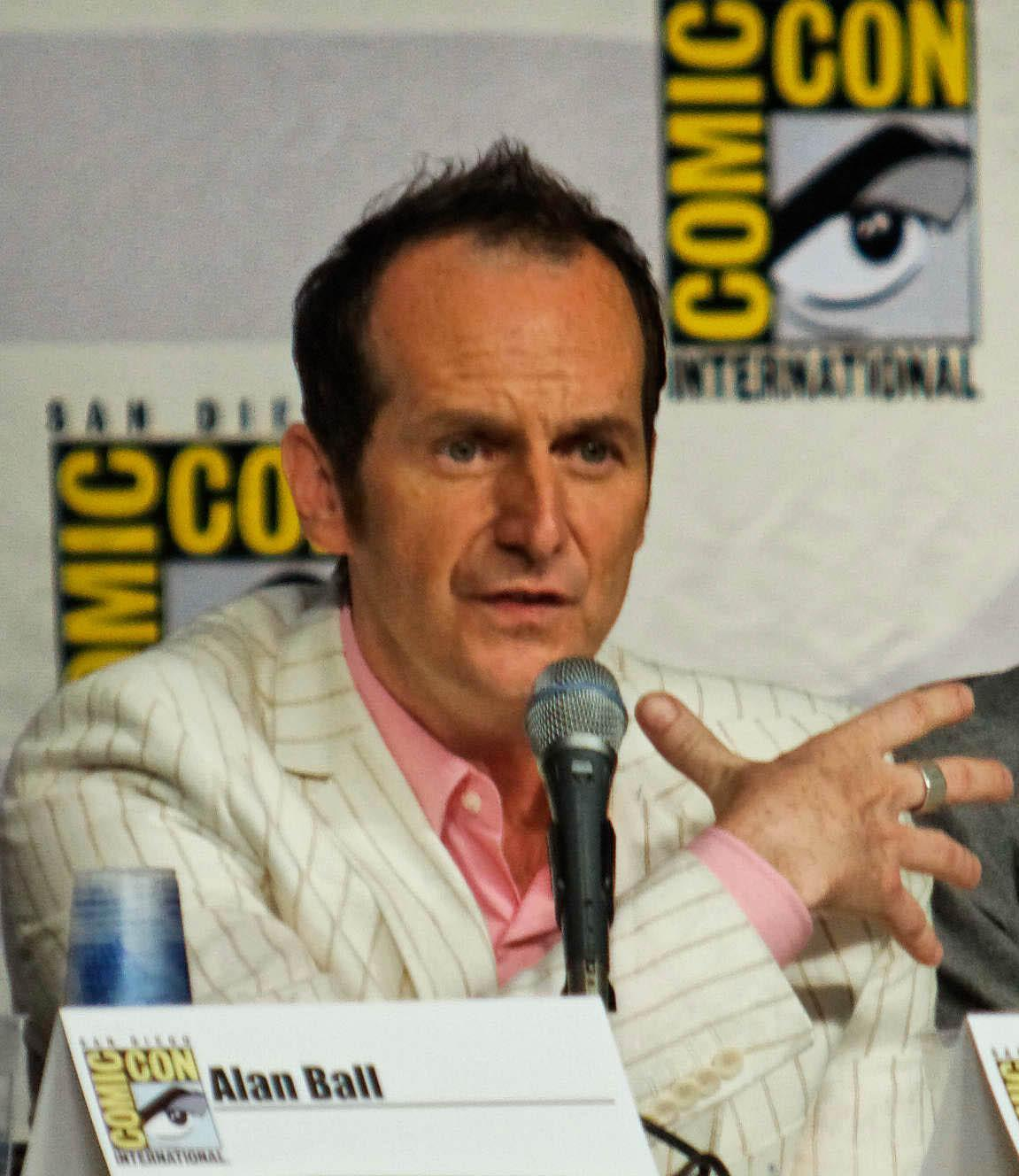
Dennis O'Hare portrayed Russell Edgington in True Blood.

=== Russell Edgington ===
Russell (portrayed by Denis O'Hare) is the 2,800-year-old vampire king of Mississippi. He is the main antagonist of Season 3 and secondary antagonist of Season 5. He was born a Celt, though he speaks in German when angered.He implicitly sided with Adolf Hitler during World War II, telling Eric Northman, "Adolf was right; there is a Master Race. It's just not the human race."

Though often gentle and polite, Russell can be wrathful, manipulative, and unstable (particularly after his vampire progeny and consort Talbot's death). He does not recognize the power of "the Authority" over vampires and secretly defies them. Russell’s age makes him significantly stronger and faster than other vampires like Eric and Bill.

Russell plots to marry the Queen of Louisiana to merge their respective kingdoms. After discovering that Sookie has unusual abilities, he takes an interest in her. When Bill is no longer of use to him, Russell orders his execution but is thwarted by Sookie.

After Eric kills Russell's consort Talbot, in retaliation for Russell murdering Eric's human family centuries ago, Russell murders an anchorman on live TV and declares that vampires are superior to humans. This leads to widespread fallout. Eric, Sookie and Bill manage to dispose of Russell at the end of the third season by tricking him and burying him underneath concrete. He escapes in Season 4 and was freed in Season 5 by Salome to serve the Authority. Russell kills Roman, the Magister of the Authority, and escapes once more. He defies the Authority again after they reject his plan to drain all faeries in order to gain the ability to walk in sunlight. He is finally staked by Eric Northman in the Season 5 finale.

=== Salome Agrippa ===
Salome (portrayed by Valentina Cervi) was the main antagonist of Season 5. She was a Chancellor of the Authority and was revealed to be Salome from the New Testament, famed for her dance of the seven veils which, according to legend, impressed her uncle, King Herod, so much that he offered to give her anything in the world she desired. After consulting her mother, she requested the head of John the Baptist, who publicly condemned Salome's mother's remarriage to her former husband's brother as invalid. Roughly 2,100 years later, Salome tells Bill Compton a different version of the story; her mother used her new husband's "fondness for teenage virgins" as a political tool to eliminate her adversary, and the so-called dance was rather the delivery of Salome to the King's bed, resulting in rape. Salome cites the humans of her youth as "far more savage than any vampires [she] has known."

She was lovers with Roman Zimojic, who uses her as his secret weapon: to seduce Bill Compton and Eric Northman. She has claimed to have been lifelong friends with Nora Gainsborough, who is revealed to be involved with the Sanguinistas, who believe Lilith will rise and everyone against her will pay. Salome's true alliance remained with the Sanguinistas, as she's the one who freed Russell Edgington, lied about injecting him with silver, and tampered with his iStake, resulting in his escape, and the murder of Roman Zimojic. After Roman's death she became the new Guardian.

In the season 5 finale, after the remaining Chancellors are pitted against each other by Lilith through visions in which she tells each of them that only one can lead them, Salome, believing herself to be the true chosen one, as she is the strongest and most devout believer in Lilith, drinks the vial believed to be filled with Lilith's blood so that she can carry out her will, which she refers to as "The Rapture," but her blood was replaced by Bill's with his own and mixed with silver. Soon after, as Salome lay dying, she accepts her fate, and says to Bill, "Lilith chose wisely." admitting to herself that she was never worthy of having Lilith’s powers. Bill stakes her and consumes the blood himself, appearing to die and be reborn, thus fulfilling Salome's prophecy.

=== Lilith ===
Lilith (portrayed by Jessica Clark) was the true main antagonist of Season 5. Lilith is the goddess that the Sanguinistas (an underground religious group composed mainly of vampires) worship and pray to. She is acknowledged in The Original Testament, the vampire Bible and predecessor to both the Old and New Testaments, as the second vampire—after God himself—and is portrayed as the messiah of vampires. The Sanguinistas also possess a vial which they believe contains the blood of Lilith. She shares her role as the season's antagonist with Bill Compton and Salome Agrippa.

=== Nora Gainesborough ===
Nora (portrayed by Lucy Griffiths) is a chancellor of the Authority. Nora's maker was Godric, making her and Eric Northman siblings. Although members of the authority, Nora and chancellor Alexander Drew were both secretly members of the Sanguinistas, a group of vampires who take the Vampire Bible to heart and believe that humans are nothing more than food for vampires and believe that Lilith will rise and take down those who don't stay true to her. Nora's cover was blown when she tried to help Eric and Bill Compton escape the country for killing spokesperson Nan Flanagan. During her interrogation, she blew chancellor Drew's cover, and he is staked by Roman in front of the rest of the Chancellors. When looking for Russell, Bill theorizes that Eric told Nora and is using Russell to help her Sanguinista movement.

After Bill, Eric, Sookie and Alcide found Russell Edgington, Eric finds out that Bill is probably right, as Nora reveals to Eric that finding Russell Edgington was God's plan, and that Lilith will rise again. Eric tries to stop Roman, but is too late as Russell Edgington breaks free and stakes Roman in front of everyone. After they drink Lilith's blood, everyone is convinced they are doing God's work, until Godric appears before her and Eric and shows that the path they are taking is wrong. She and Eric escape the Authority, only to break back in again to get Jessica, Pam and Bill out. In the middle of their escape, Jason mentions the name Warlow, and Nora recognizes his name from the Vampyr Bible, Lilith's progeny. Afterwards, she tries to find Warlow, because only Warlow can kill Lilith. In her search for him she is caught by the new vampire police and is taken away. Nora is taken to Vamp Camp, where she is strapped to a gurney and infected with Hep V in front of Eric. Eric frees them both and takes Nora to Bill, begging him to use his new powers to heal her. Despite giving her some of his blood, Bill can't heal her. While Bill is trying to find Warlow, Nora succumbs to the virus and dies in Eric's arms.

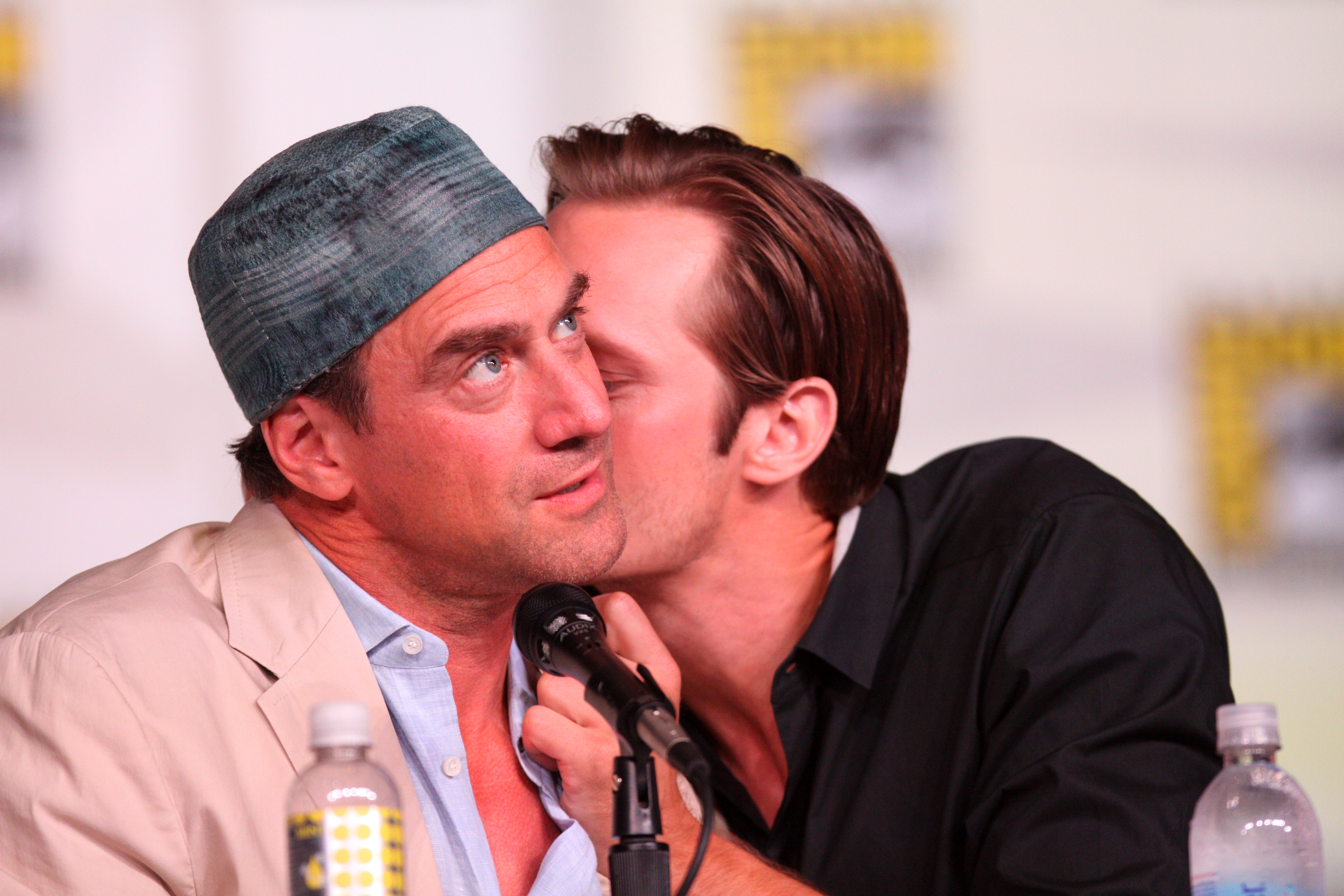
Chris Meloni and Alexander Skarsgard speaking at the 2012 San Diego Comic-Con.

=== Roman Zimojic ===
Roman (portrayed by Christopher Meloni) is the head of the Authority. Roman's ranking in the authority is the Guardian, as in Guardian of the Blood of Lilith, the first vampire created in God's image. What the vampires are holding back from the humans is they have a bible that pre-dates the Old and New Testament, which states that vampires were created in God's image and humans were created to nourish vampires. The Authority focuses on mainstreaming, claiming they believe the bible is a metaphor on how to live your life in peace among humans, and are trying to take down the Sanguinistas, who believe that humans should be farmed like cattle and serve as nothing but food. However, the Authority themselves are just using mainstreaming to gain power and satisfy their ego.

After what happened with the witches in season 4, the Authority issued the true deaths for Bill Compton and Eric Northman, and asked spokesperson Nan Flanagan to take them out. Eric kills her bodyguards and Bill stakes her to protect themselves, but shortly after are brought to Roman, along with chancellor Nora Gainesborough (Eric's sister), who tried to help them flee the country. Bill offers Roman an exchange: if they bring in Russell Edgington, they'll be let go. After bringing Russell in, Eric and Bill are freed and Russell is about to be executed, when we discover that someone tampered with Russell's iStake, who then rips it off and stakes Roman in front of everyone.

=== Willa Burrell ===
Willa (portrayed by Amelia Rose Blaire) is the daughter of former Louisiana Governor Truman Burrell who clashes with her father over vampire rights. Eric abducts and turns her into a vampire, revealing her mother had abandoned the family for a vampire and fueling her father's bigotry. Eric, seeking revenge, demands Willa return home as a vampire. Though her father considers ending the hunt, he orders Willa to be shot and arrested when she attempts to feed on him. Realizing he intends to "cure" her, Willa demands to be sent to Gen Pop to be trained by Tara. She helps Eric and Nora escape and informs Pam about Hep V in TruBlood, later enjoying the sun after feeding on Bill until Warlow's death.

In Season 7, following Tara's death alongside Pam and Eric's disappearance, Willa feels depressed and isolated. Eric returns to Bon Temp and summons her before his anticipated death, happy to see his young progeny. She yells at him for abandoning her so soon after she was made. Along with the other healthy vampires, Willa fights the Hep V Vamps. Eric later releases Willa, apologizes, and tells her that he is proud to have her in the family. Willa is last seen at a Thanksgiving celebration at Sookie's house, working for Arlene.

=== James Kent ===
James (portrayed by Luke Grimes and Nathan Parsons) is a vampire born in the late 1940s or early 1950s. James meets Jessica in a vampire camp, where experiments are done on vampires. When Sarah Newlin tries to force James to have sex with Jessica, James refuses. He is tortured for his refusal, enduring UV burns and broken teeth. Impressed, Jessica and James grow close. James later falls in love with Lafayette.

=== Violet Mazurski ===
Violet (portrayed by Karolina Wydra) is a vampire who was born in Prussia during the late 12th century. As Jason is about to be attacked by hungry vampires at the vampire camp, Violet claims Jason as her own. When Jason has sex with Jessica, Violet gets very jealous. She kidnaps Wade Cleary, Adilyn Bellefleur, and Jessica. However, Hoyt Fortenberry kills Violet and sets the others free.

== Supernaturals ==
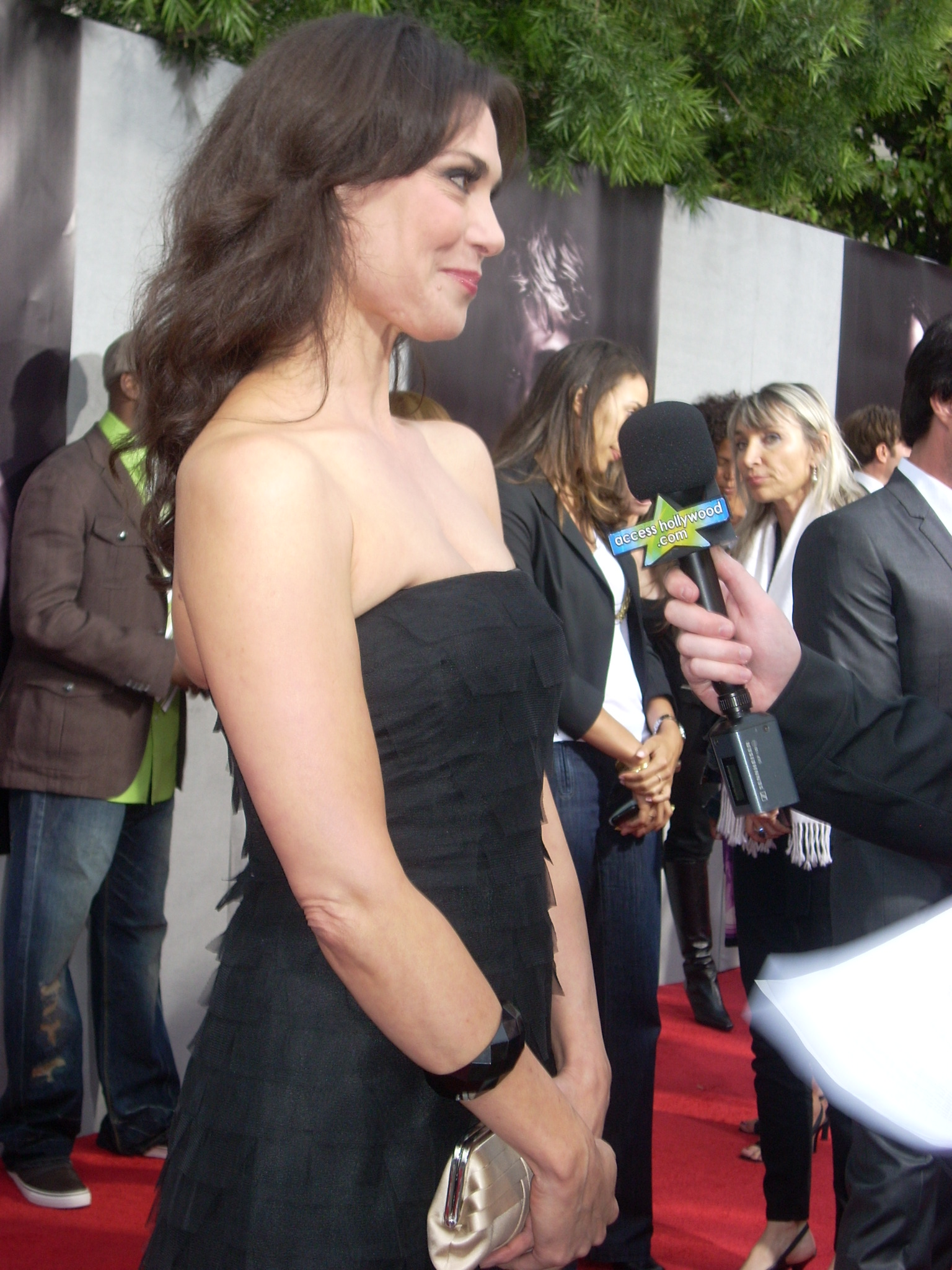
Michelle Forbes, who portrayed Maryann Foster, at the True Blood Season 2 premiere party in 2009.

=== Maenads ===
==== Maryann Forrester ====
Maryann (portrayed by Michelle Forbes) was the main antagonist of Season 2. Maryann Forrester is a wealthy maenad, who initially presents herself as a social worker. Drawn to Bon Temps due to the potent energy she attributes to a ritual performed by a faux voodoo doctor, she takes an interest in Tara and has Tara move in with her. She introduces Tara to 'Eggs' Benedict Talley, a troubled man she had previously taken in to take care of and used to kill several of her victims.

Throughout the second season, Maryann's true nature becomes apparent: she is devoted to Dionysus and intends to find a suitable supernatural creature to kill in his honour, hoping to bring him to earth once again. She finds pleasure in hosting giant orgies, creating mayhem and chaos and witnessing pure lust. She controls the actions of the inhabitants of Bon Temps by putting a bizarre spell on them, which turns their eyes completely black and has them do her bidding. Sookie, however, is unaffected by Maryann's spell.

Maryann turns into a full-blown antagonist when she settles into Sookie's house and orders the Bon Temps residents to capture Sam Merlotte, whom she intends to sacrifice in her tribute to Dionysus. She ultimately succeeds in capturing Sam and has Eggs slide a knife in his heart, but Bill saves Sam. Sam, shifting into a white bull, has Maryann believe Dionysus has returned to earth. Hence Maryann drops her supernatural shields and Sam, still in the guise of a white bull, is able to kill Maryann for good. After she is killed the townfolk return to their senses and have no memory of what they had done under Maryann's influence and remember her simply as the elegant woman who threw wild parties. In season 5, Sookie remembers Maryann when she thinks about all the people in her life who believed she was not human.

=== Witches, Wiccans, and brujos ===
==== Holly Cleary ====
Holly (portrayed by Lauren Bowles) is a witch, hired as a waitress at Merlotte's in the third season. She is very friendly and helps Tara and Arlene throughout Season 3. She reveals herself as a victim of a brutal rape from years before and a single mother of two. She is also a devoted Wiccan. When Arlene decides that she doesn't want her baby, but cannot morally abort it, Holly performs a Wiccan ceremony to help Arlene miscarry. However, the ritual is unsuccessful. She is also present at Tara's rape victim support group.

In season 4, it is revealed that Holly is one of Marnie's students and a member of her coven. After the incident with Eric, she leaves the coven. While she still is a waitress at Merlotte's, Sookie reads her mind and finds out that she has abandoned Marnie's witch coven for her and her sons' safety. Tara asks her to rejoin the coven and take revenge on the vampires who attacked them, but Marnie betrays the coven for her quest for power. She starts dating Andy Bellefleur at the end of Season 4.

In season 7, Holly is one of several characters captured by Hep-V vampires. She is rescued by Sookie and Bill when the vamps take her on a "field trip" as a food source. Sookie then later uses her powers to jog Holly's memories in order to find out the other prisoners are being held in the abandoned Fangtasia. In episode 5, Andy proposes to Holly and she accepts.

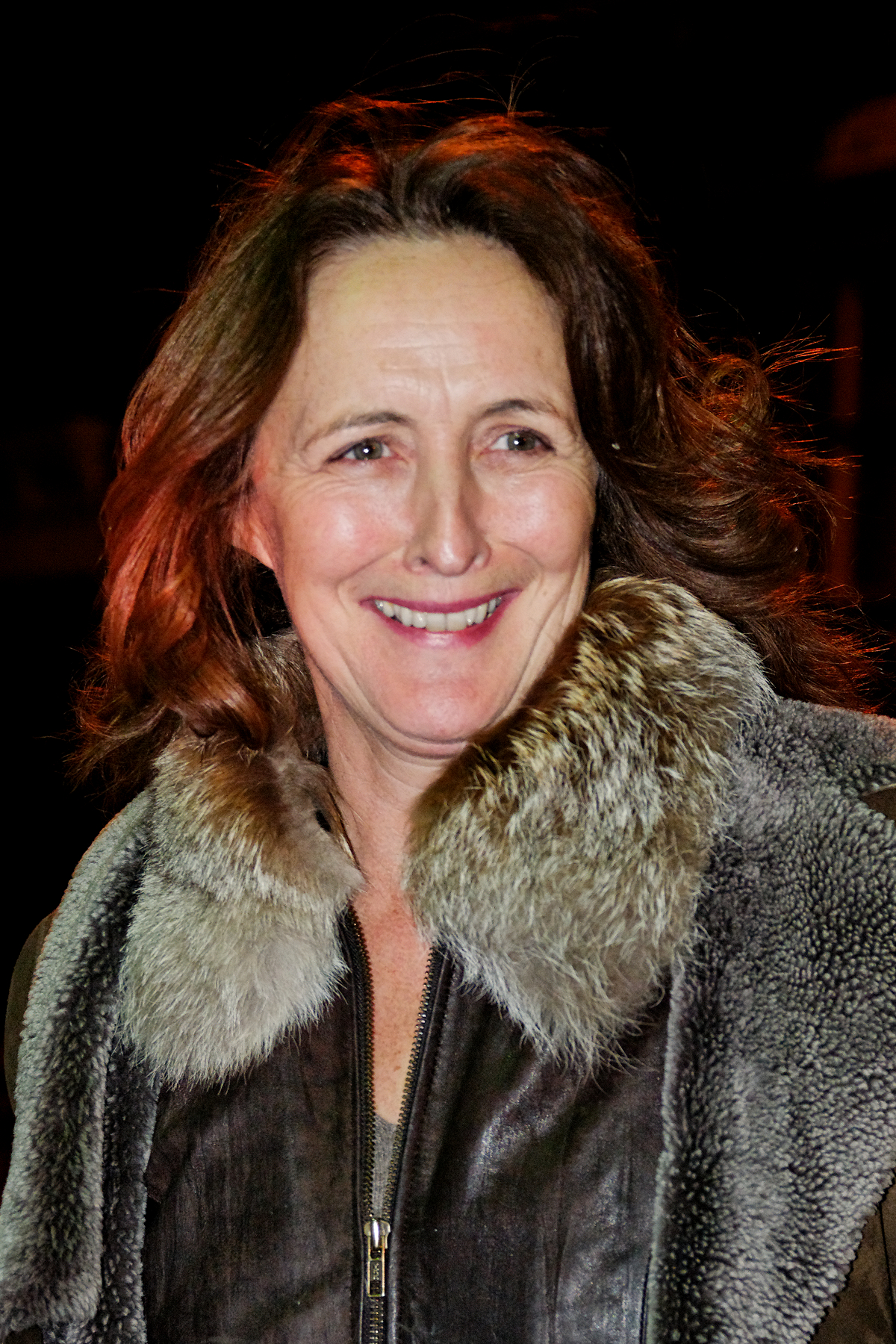
Actress Fiona Shaw portrayed Marnie Stonebrook.

==== Marnie Stonebrook ====
Marnie (portrayed by Fiona Shaw) was the main antagonist of Season 4. Marnie Stonebrook is a local shop owner and palm-reader, and leader of the Wiccan coven to which Holly Cleary and Jesús Velásquez belong. A timid character, she comes under the influence of the spirit of Antonia, whose great power allows her to raise a bird from the dead.

Seeing an apparent necromancer as a threat to vampires, Bill Compton sends Eric Northman to break up the meetings, but Antonia possesses Marnie to cast a spell on him wiping Eric's memories. Marnie is unsure how the spell works, but attempts to reverse it under pressure from Pam. When Pam, impatient, becomes menacing, Antonia again inhabits Marnie, and casts a spell on Pam, disfiguring her. Marnie's students quickly abandon her as a result. Bill has Marnie captured and imprisoned in his mansion, but she admits while glamored that she has no idea how to reverse either spell. She is then fully taken over by Antonia, who plans to kill all vampires. Tara runs into her walking down a road while waiting for Pam to attack her, and they band together to get revenge on vampires. Antonia gathers the coven of Wiccans to fight against the vampire race. When the battle becomes too extreme, the others want out but she forces them to stay.

After the massacre of the Tolerance Festival, Antonia is disheartened by seeing innocent casualties and leaves Marnie's body, but Marnie convinces her to rejoin her as collateral damage is to be expected, revealing a shift in her attitudes. After Marnie cold-bloodedly kills a member of the coven Antonia wants out, but Marnie puts a binding spell on her drawing her back in. Jesús performs a ritual to free Antonia's spirit from Marnie. Bill shoots Marnie, killing her. However, Marnie's spirit appears before Lafayette and enters his body. She kills Jesús to steal his power and then tries to burn Eric and Bill at the stake. With the help of Holly, Sookie and Tara, the spirits of Antonia and Adele appear and convince Marnie it is time to leave the realm of the living, which she does.

==== Jesús Velásquez ====
Jesús (portrayed by Kevin Alejandro) is introduced in the third season as a potential love interest to Lafayette. He was born in Catemaco, Veracruz, México. He works as a nurse at the mental institution where Lafayette's mother is a patient. On their first meeting, he seems to take an immediate interest in Lafayette, followed by a personal visit to Merlotte's to spend time with Lafayette while he is at work. Although they like each other, he leaves once he finds out Lafayette is a drug dealer. When Lafayette calls Jesús to help with his mother, their attraction is once again ignited, and they spend the night together. Jesús reveals himself to be a "brujo" (or "witch") to Lafayette and encourages him to develop his wiccan talents. In season 4, he is revealed to be a Wiccan student of Marnie Stonebrook. The character is exclusive to the series, and was developed to help extend Lafayette's storyline. In the season 4 finale, Marnie kills Jesús to gain his power. His ghost later visits Lafayette to comfort him.

=== Weres and shapeshifters ===
==== Crystal Norris ====
Crystal (portrayed by Lindsay Pulsipher), a werepanther from the inbred commune of Hotshot, Louisiana, becomes involved with Jason after a drug raid. Though attracted to him, she is promised to be married to Felton, her half-brother. Despite Jason's attempts to help her escape Hotshot, Felton and her father always force her to return. Crystal eventually hides at Jason's house, where he accepts her as a werepanther. She is soon forced to leave with Felton, after he kills her father. Jason pledges to track her down. Crystal later reappears, kidnapping Jason to forcibly turn him into a werepanther to breed with him and continue her bloodline. After Jason escapes and kills Felton, Crystal declares herself the new head of the werepanther community. When she asks Jason to return and be with her, he rejects her.

==== Tommy Mickens ====
Tommy (portrayed by Marshall Allman) is an illiterate teenage shapeshifter and Sam's younger brother. He has tried to kill Sam and has stolen from him. He is shocked by the news of having a brother he never knew about and hates him at first, but after spending time with him he begins to enjoy having Sam as a brother to the point that he asks Sam to let him stay with him after a fight with his father. After Sam discovers that his parents have been using Tommy in dog fighting, he lets Tommy move in. He starts working in Sam's bar, but is fired after picking a fight. While working in the bar he shows an attraction to Jessica, even attacking Hoyt in his dog form. He then attempts to steal Sam's money, but Sam angrily shoots him. At some point during the year separating seasons 3 and 4, Tommy, left with no place to stay, is aided by Maxine Fortenberry who welcomes him to stay at her house. Later Tommy is contacted by his mother and is abducted by Joe Lee who intends to use him for dog fighting again. Tommy manages to retaliate immediately and kills Joe Lee and his mother while trying to escape. He then goes to Sam for help, and they both dispose of the bodies in the swamp, to be eaten by the alligators.

Bearing out the legend relayed to Sam early in season four, Tommy, having killed his shifter mother, becomes a Skinwalker, complicating Sam's life significantly. In the form of Sam, he fires Sookie and has sex with Luna before kicking her out, prompting Sam to kick him out for good. He then takes the form of Maxine to sell her natural gas rights. He then writes an apology note for Sam on his way out before being confronted by Marcus who is looking for Sam. Tommy shows up to Marcus' shop in the form of Sam and Marcus warns him to stay away from Luna, his ex-wife. Tommy as Sam claims he never touched her, but that his brother did, prompting Marcus and his wolves to beat up Tommy to the point that he reverts to his original form. Alcide then takes Tommy to Merlotte's where Sam meets them. Tommy is about to die from the beating and shape shifting. Sam tries to call for some vampire blood to heal Tommy, but Tommy doesn't want it and makes amends with Sam before dying.

==== Luna Garza ====
Luna (portrayed by Janina Gavankar) is a shapeshifter in whom Sam takes a romantic interest. A member of one of Sam's evening shapeshifter gatherings, Luna reveals that she is a Skinwalker and can take the form of another human being. She is initially reluctant to start a relationship with Sam because her ex-husband, and father of her daughter, is a jealous werewolf, but finally decides she wants to be with him. She is turned off from him after the first night they supposedly have sex when he is extremely rude toward her. She and Sam soon learn that it was Tommy, in the form of Sam, that had sex with her. She and Sam finally consummate their relationship on a camping trip with her daughter. When a group of gunmen begin hunting down supes and hurt her and Sam, she sends her daughter Emma to live with her grandmother, Martha Bozeman, until she and Sam deal with the gunmen. During that time, Steve Newlin and Russell Edgington feed the wolfpack with V and when Martha refuses to drink, Russell takes Emma away while from her in wolf form and gives her to Steve as his new pet. Upon discovery of Emma's whereabouts, Sam and Luna sneak into the Vampire Authority to get her back. The plan was to have Luna shapeshift into Steve Newlin as she walks Emma out with Sam following them as a fly when Rosalyn Harris, thinking Luna is Steve, puts her in front of a camera to explain Steve and Russell's actions at a fraternity house that killed 22 people. Luna shape-shifts back to herself on National TV, and Sam kills Rosalyn before she could attack Luna. The pain of shape-shifting back into herself fatally wounds Luna and tells Sam to take her daughter and hide her from the public and the wolf pack before she dies.

=== Werewolves ===
==== Rikki Naylor ====
Rikki (portrayed by Kelly Overton) is a werewolf and a member of Marcus Bozeman's pack until his death. She was instructed to bring Sam Merlotte, the prime suspect in his death, back for torture until he told them where the body is. It's not until after they find the body do they realize Alcide Herveaux, the next in line for packmaster, killed Marcus. When Alcide declines to be packmaster, J.D. steps up to be leader of the pack. When Alcide finds out J.D. has been making other wolves to drink V, he challenges J.D. to fight for the title of packmaster and Rikki volunteers to be Alcide's second in command. During their training, Rikki and Alcide get a little bit closer and end up having sex.

On the night of the challenge, Alcide loses and gets beaten up by J.D. Alcide takes off back to his father's trailer in Jackson, not even telling Rikki where he went. It's not until Martha Bozeman brings Rikki to his father's trailer does he decide to finish off J.D. once and for all when he force feeds her the V, and she OD'ed. After Alcide became packmaster, Rikki and Alcide's relationship begins to strain; he cheats on her with another werewolf and she attacks a group of VUS (Vampire Unity Society) members following them, against Alcide's wishes. When Alcide lets Nicole and Sam go, Rikki finds out he lied about their deaths and challenges him, thinking he's no longer fit to be pack master. Alcide wins, but doesn't kill her, allowing her to become the new pack master.

==== Jackson Herveaux ====
Jackson (portrayed by Robert Patrick), a werewolf, is Alcide Herveaux's father. He was formerly a pack master. Now he lives in a trailer home in Jackson, Mississippi. When Martha Bozeman brings Rikki Naylor to his trailer home for help after she OD'ed on V, he injects silver into her to force the V out of her system. He helps his son take back the pack from J.D. by giving him a vial of V. After Alcide kills J.D., Jackson becomes a member of the pack, and appears to be Alcide's second, instead of Rikki. Throughout Alcide's journey to find Sam and Nicole, he tries to get him to understand that he needs to do what is right, not what's good for the pack. With this information, Alcide decides to let Sam and Nicole go. Alcide drops his dad off at his trailer, thanking him for his help, and Jackson leaves Alcide to deal with the pack on his own. In season 7, Sookie calls Jackson to tell him of Alcide's death.

=== Fae ===
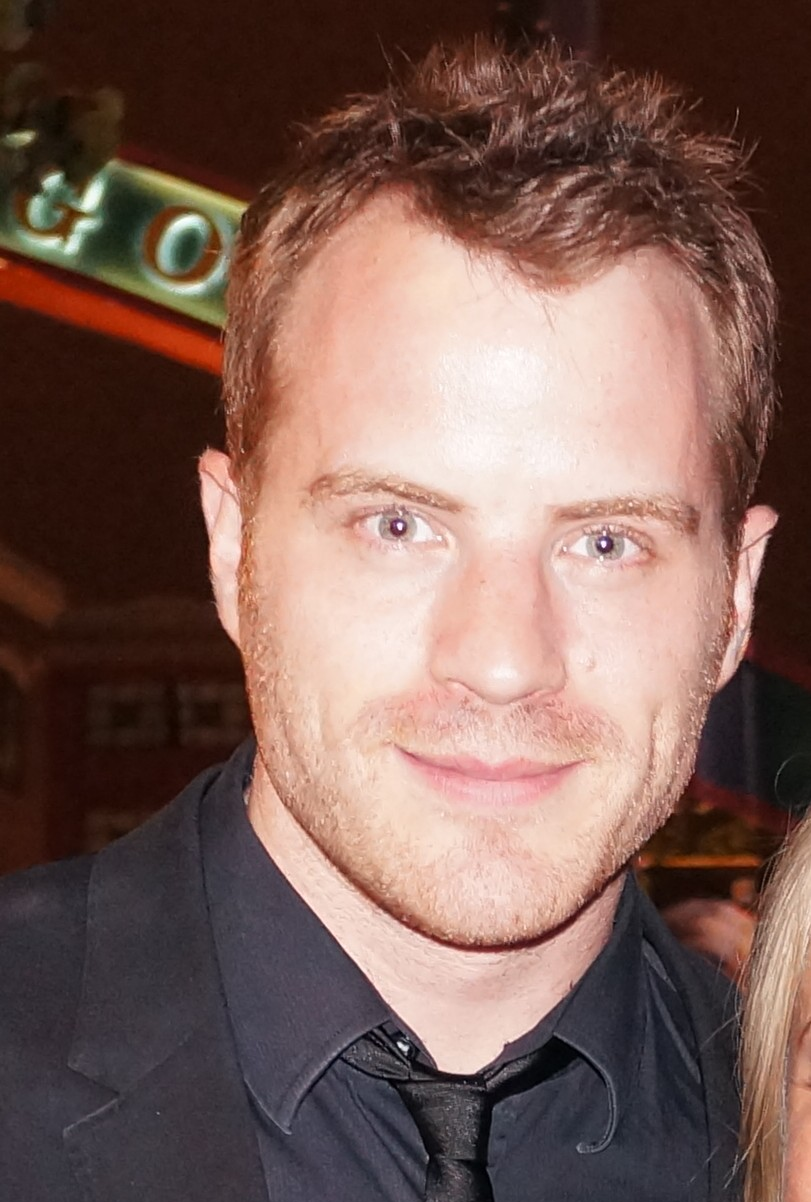
Actor Rob Kazinsky portrayed Macklyn Warlow.

==== Macklyn Warlow/Ben Flynn ====
Macklyn (portrayed by Rob Kazinsky) is the only known fae/vampire hybrid and the first of Lilith’s progeny. (Note: Lilith's first and thus the oldest sired vampire per flashback dated by caption as 3496 BC in True Blood season 6, episode 5) He is the main antagonist of True Blood Season 6. Born in 3532 BC, and turned at 32, (Note: True Blood season 6, episode 6; scene begins about Prime Video counter 19:15.) Lilith chose Warlow because she believed he could save the vampire race. Resentful, Warlow uses his faerie powers to kill Lilith. As such, he has outlived his maker by millennia and has been active sporadically in the human realm to modern times.

He has telepathy, fires energy beams, and can walk in sunlight. In 1702, Sookie's ancestor made a contract (Note: True Blood season 5, episode 10; the scene begins at Prime Video counter 44:55.) to give Warlow his first fae-bearing female heir. When Sookie's parents refused to surrender her, Warlow killed them and was banished to another dimension by the faerie Claudine.

After escaping the faerie realm, Warlow poses as "Ben Flynn" to approach Sookie. Jason and Niall uncover his true identity and attempt to kill him, but he overpowers them. Sookie attempts to poison him with colloidal silver, but it has no effect. He tries to court Sookie, but she forces him out of her house with her faerie light in the middle of foreplay. Warlow explains that he killed her parents because they were trying to kill her in order to protect her from him. Sookie later discovers that this is true when her father's spirit possesses Lafayette and attempts to kill her again. Lilith's blood allows Bill to recognize Warlow as Lilith's progeny. His stable fae/vampire blood lets vampires walk in daylight, prompting Bill to ask the creator of Tru Blood to help synthesize it.

Bill frees Warlow to save Sookie, who transports him to the faerie realm to keep Warlow away from Bill. Warlow, seeking Sookie as his fae-vampire bride, develops a relationship with her. She Sookie asks Warlow to save her friends, Warlow demands that Sookie become "his" in exchange. Sookie agrees after much consideration, resentful of her parents' attempts to kill her. However, when Sookie brings Bill to Warlow, they find that Eric has attacked him. After Bill saved the other vampires by allowing them to drink the blood sample he drank earlier, Sookie tells Warlow that she wants to take things slowly and introduce Warlow to her friends and family first. Warlow grows angry and tries to turn Sookie by force. Bill, Jason, and others rescue Sookie, but Warlow follows and defeats them. Before Warlow can drain Sookie, Niall intervenes, allowing Jason to stake and kill Warlow. Warlow's death causes all who drank his blood to lose the ability to walk in daylight.

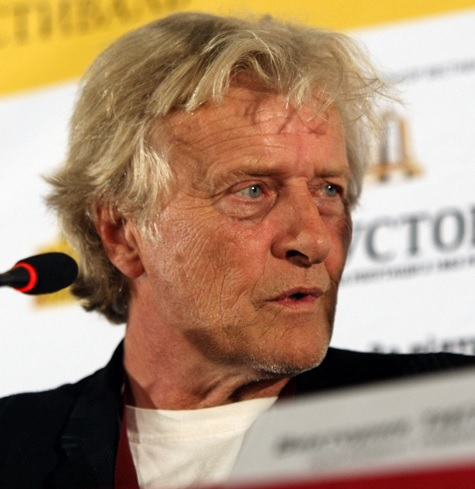
Rutger Hauer portrayed Niall Brigant.

==== Niall Brigant ====
Niall (portrayed by Rutger Hauer), an ancient, powerful fae of royalty, is the faerie grandfather of Sookie and Jason Stackhouse. Born around 3500 B.C., he was in the same fae tribe as Warlow, and the sole survivor after Warlow slaughters them after being made vampire by Lilith. Niall arrives in Bon Temps in season six to help the Stackhouse siblings fight Warlow. He reveals that their royal faerie bloodline is why Warlow seeks to marry Sookie. In an attempt to round up all the fae to help them fight Warlow, Niall finds all the faeries murdered by Warlow. He recruits Ben Flynn, a kindred fae who is secretly is Macklyn Warlow. Warlow overpowers Niall and Jason, glamouring Jason and draining Niall before throwing him into a dark dimension. Niall manifests in the human world just in time to help the siblings kill Warlow, and in turn they help him escape the dark dimension. His fae powers are exponentially greater than other fae, allowing instant teleportation and powerful light energy blasts that can destroy vampires with the force of a supernova.

==== Adilyn Bellefleur ====
Adilyn (portrayed by Bailey Noble) is one of the four half-faerie daughters of Bon Temps sheriff, Andy Bellefleur, and the faerie Maurella. She is initially called "Number 4" by an overwhelmed Andy.

Adilyn was conceived late in the fourth season. In the fifth season, Maurella leaves the four daughters in Andy's care. Andy realizes that his daughters age at a rapid rate; they transform from infants to young women in a matter of days. As teenagers, she and her sisters decide to sneak out of the Bellefleur mansion for a night on the town. While trying to purchase liquor, they are targeted for their faerie blood by Jessica and Bill. When they try to escape, Jessica attacks. Unable to control herself, she drains and kills three of the girls. Andy furiously rescues "Number 4", who requests her father to finally name her. Andy names her Adilyn, and to honor her sisters, gives her the middle names Braelyn, Charlaine, and Danika. Though unsure of her powers, Adilyn helps rescue Sookie from Warlow on the Faerie Plane at the end of season six. She develops a cautious relationship with the remorseful Jessica, who protects her and Andy from the deadly Hep-V infected vampires.

== Supporting and guest characters ==
=== Vampires ===
Listed in order of first appearances.

==== Introduced in season one ====
- Liam, Malcolm, and Diane (portrayed by Graham Shiels, Andrew Rothenberg, and Aunjanue Ellis) appear in episode 2, Strange Love (Liam) and episode 2, The First Taste (Malcolm and Diane). They are vampire acquaintances of Bill Compton who live together in a "nest" (a small coterie of vampires; living together in this way often makes the members more brutal and callous about human life) and come to live Bon Temps during the first season. They all despise mainstreaming and have no regard for human life. Malcolm is the oldest of the three; indeed, he is older than Bill, and assumes a leadership role in the nest. He likes to party and has a human lover named Jerry. Sookie discovers, telepathically, that Jerry has hepatitis D and is trying to infect the nest. Liam pays Maudette Pickens a large sum of money to have sex with her and is videotaped in the act. Diane slept with Bill shortly after she was turned in the 1930s and has been trying to seduce him ever since. All three vampires are killed in a fire set by Royce Williams and his associates, Chuck and Wayne. Sookie initially thinks Bill was caught in the fire as well.
- Longshadow (portrayed by Raoul Trujillo) is the bartender at Fangtasia. In season one, Sookie discovers that he's been stealing money from the bar when she reads the mind of a waitress working there named Ginger. Longshadow glamors Ginger when she discovers what he's been doing. Bill stakes Longshadow to save Sookie's life when he attacks her for revealing his treachery, and this murder means that Bill now must be punished by the local vampires.
- Chow Lin (portrayed by Patrick Gallagher) is the bartender at the Shreveport Vampire Bar, Fangtasia. Chow is introduced in the series as the new bartender after Longshadow is staked by Bill. When they first meet in season one, Bill admits that he prefers Longshadow after Chow boasts of having a lower par in a golf video game for Wii.
- The Magister (portrayed by Željko Ivanek) was a vampire judge who presided over all the vampires of North America. He was from the Iberian peninsula and was turned during the late ninth century. He was feared because of his political power and advanced age. During the first season, he tried and sentenced Bill for murdering Longshadow, a fellow vampire. As punishment for the crime, he forced Bill to sire Jessica in order to replace the vampire he had killed during a time when their numbers are so important. In season three, he tasked Sophie-Anne and Eric with finding out who was selling vampire blood and their source. Although he was suspicious that they were the actual culprits he nonetheless took their innocence at face value. In episode 7, he was forced by King Russell to officiate the marriage between him and Queen Sophie-Anne. After the deed was done, Russell used The Magister's cane to decapitate him.

==== Introduced in season two ====
- Godric (portrayed by Allan Hyde) is a 2,100-year-old vampire and Eric Northman’s maker. Godric is the sheriff of Area 9, a large region including Dallas, Texas. Born in Gaul in the first century, Godric was enslaved in Rome. He was turned into a vampire at age 16 by his abusive master, whom he later killed. Godric favors human-vampire coexistence. Eric Northman, his progeny, holds him in the highest regard. When Godric goes missing, Eric sends Sookie and Hugo to find him. The anti-vampire group, the Fellowship of the Sun, is holding Godric captive for execution. Godric rescues Sookie, killing her attacker, and peacefully defuses a standoff between vampires and the Fellowship. However, a retaliatory suicide bomber from the Fellowship of the Sun destroys his home and kills some of his companions (both human and vampire). Godric reveals he surrendered willingly, hoping his death would bring reconciliation and atonement for his past crimes. He resigns as sheriff and, weary of his long life and the persistent conflict between species, chooses to "meet the sun" at dawn on the roof of the Hotel Carmilla with Sookie present. Godric's spirit later appears to Eric multiple times, urging peace, until Lilith's vision seemingly destroys his spirit.
- Isabel Beaumont (portrayed by Valerie Cruz) is a lieutenant of Godric's introduced during the second season. She and Stan bicker constantly throughout the investigation in Dallas, much to Eric's frustration. At one point, Stan mentions that she has been working for Godric for forty years. She has a human boyfriend, Hugo, who accompanies Sookie when she infiltrates the Fellowship of the Sun, but is revealed to be a traitor to the vampires. In a conversation with Eric, she describes her interest in Hugo as being like "a science experiment", however even after the discovery of Hugo's treachery she admits to still loving him (prompting Godric to reduce his punishment from execution to banishment). During a meeting with Nan Flanagan that results in Godric's resignation, he recommends that Isabel take his position as the sheriff of Area Nine. Whether or not she becomes Godric's replacement after his suicide is unclear. Her appearance in "I Will Rise Up" suggests that she does not follow Hugo into exile. Sookie phones her while she is looking for Bill, suggesting that she is still in Dallas.
- Stan Baker (portrayed by Ed Quinn) is Godric's lieutenant in Texas. He is opposed to vampires "coming out of the coffin", and wants to kill the members of the Fellowship of the Sun. Despite his high position under Godric's rule of Area 9, his brash, unrepentant attitude and his view of humans as nothing more than food made him untrustworthy in the eyes of most other vampires. His age is unknown but it's implied that he was turned during the 19th century. According to Isabel, he was killed by Luke's suicide bombing Godric's nest.
- Sophie-Anne Leclerq (portrayed by Evan Rachel Wood) is the 500-year-old Vampire Queen of Louisiana. She is forced into a marriage of convenience with Russell Edgington. Sophie is cold, unforgiving, powerful, and spoiled. To maintain her fortune, she forces Eric to make Lafayette sell V in flagrant violation of vampire taboos. Her human lover, Hadley, is Sookie's cousin. When Hadley informs Sophie-Anne of Sookie's abilities before the series begins, the Queen sends Bill Compton to seduce and procure Sookie. At their first meeting, Bill allows Sookie to be brutally attacked by the Rattrays in order to feed her his blood. After Sookie discovers this and angrily throws Bill out, he blames Sophie-Anne and lures the Queen to his home to fight to the death. A brief fight ends abruptly when Bill reveals Nan Flanagan's armed forces hidden in the home, who violently kill Sophie-Anne with wooden bullets. This assassination was part of a deal; in exchange for arranging Sophie-Anne's assassination, Nan makes Bill the new Vampire King of Louisiana.

==== Introduced in season three ====
- Talbot (portrayed by Theo Alexander) is Russell Edgington's husband, turned by him some 700 years ago in his native Greece. He is seen to be very sensitive, taking interruptions to his carefully planned dinners and damage to his mansion very personally. During the episodes, we can hear Talbot speaking Greek. Talbot has a liking for Eric Northman and seems to be totally uninterested in Russell's political plans. Eventually, his anger over Russell's antics reaches a boiling point and he breaks several of the artifacts Russell has collected over the centuries. Eric agrees to spend time with him while Russell is out of town to calm him down. Once they are alone, Eric seduces him. He stakes Talbot from behind, killing him. Russell, unhinged by Talbot's death, had his remains placed in a glass jar which he took with him wherever he went. In the season 3 finale, Sookie takes Talbot's remains and pours them down the sink, torturing Russell by turning on the garbage disposal as she does.
- Franklin Mott (portrayed by James Frain) was a British vampire who worked for Russell Edgington as an investigator. He was first seen entering Merlotte's and having a one-night stand with Tara. He then revealed his true colours when he blackmailed Jessica into telling him all she knew about Bill. He then bit and tied up Tara and took her to Russell's mansion. He was emotionally unstable and wanted Tara to become his vampire bride. In order for Tara to escape and find Sookie, she mercilessly bludgeoned him using a medieval morning star. Despite his injuries, which included a crushed skull, he survived. In the episode "Everything is Broken", Franklin found Tara in the parking lot of Merlotte's. While he was choking her, Jason shot him in the heart with a wooden bullet, granting him the true death at last.

=== Supporting characters ===
==== Introduced in season two ====
Listed in order of first appearances.

- Luke McDonald (played by Wes Brown) is a Fellowship of the Sun member from Odessa, Texas. Luke is Jason Stackhouse's friend, enemy, and rival at various points in the season. He joins the anti-vampire church's training camp after a knee injury ends his military and college football aspirations. He initially bonds with Jason but grows jealous of Jason's attention. He became a Soldier of the Sun, often performing poorly due to their rivalry. They briefly reconciled when Jason helped him over a fence. After a clash between Stan's vampires and the Fellowship, Luke appears to vanish. He reappears at Godric's gathering with a silver bomb. He detonates it, killing himself, three vampires, and two humans. The character was also featured in interactive internet campaigns, including a fictional blog and YouTube channel.
- Barry Horowitz (played by Chris Coy) is a telepathic bellboy at Dallas' Hotel Carmilla who fears revealing his ability. He initially refuses Sookie's attempts to communicate. However, when Sookie calls for help telepathically after her capture by the Fellowship of the Sun, Barry helps her. Lorena briefly feeds on Barry but stops after sensing his blood is different, which distracts her long enough for Bill to attack her with a TV. Bill then helps Barry escape. In Season 4, Barry makes a brief appearance in the faerie world of Fae with his faerie godfather, eating a magical glowing fruit.
- Gabe (played by Greg Collins) is the mercenary second-in-command of the anti-vampire group the Soldiers of the Sun. When they learn of Hugo and Sookie Stackhouse's plan to infiltrate the Fellowship of the Sun, Gabe helps Rev. Steve Newlin kidnap and imprison them in the church basement, where they are also keeping vampires and a vampire-fighting arsenal. After Rev. Newlin learns that Jason and Sookie are siblings, Gabe apprehends and plans to execute Jason for his betrayal. Jason overpowers him and escapes. Enraged, Gabe returns to the church where he attempts to rape Sookie before he is killed by the vampire Godric.
- Hadley Hale (played by Lindsey Haun) is Sookie and Jason Stackhouse's cousin and Queen Sophie-Anne's human lover. She is first mentioned in season one at Adele "Gran" Stackhouse’s funeral, where Sookie comments that Hadley has left the rehabilitation clinic Gran paid for but no one knows where she is. In season two, she appears as part of Sophie-Anne's retinue of human companions. Hadley privately asks Bill about Sookie and Gran, aware she can't leave the vampire world but still curious about people in her past. In the third season, Sophie-Anne reveals that Hadley is her human lover and companion during her imprisonment. Hadley had previously revealed Sookie's telepathic gift, sparking the queen’s interest in her. Eric Northman exploits a fearful Hadley for information on Sookie, saving her own life. Eric uses her again to deliver a message to Sookie. In season three episode 9, Hadley is revealed to have an 8-year-old son, Hunter, who shares Sookie's telepathic gift.

==== Introduced in season three ====
Listed in order of first appearances.

- Yvetta (portrayed by Natasha Alam) is the new exotic dancer of Fangtasia in season three. Initially enjoying the attention of Eric, as much as she eventually gets to think he actually cares for her, she is eventually hit with the realization that she is of no interest at all to him. In retaliation for his callous attitude, she saves Sookie from captivity, and cleans out the bar's safe. Though thought of as an uneducated immigrant by Pam, Yvetta reveals that in her native country, Estonia, she was a cardiologist.
- Cooter (Coot) (portrayed by Grant Bowler) is the leader of his werewolf pack that was responsible for kidnapping Bill Compton at Russell Edgington's request. He is engaged to Debbie, Alcide's ex-girlfriend. He is seen as immature, wild, and crazy. In episode 7, he is shot twice by Alcide, and dies.
- Gus (portrayed by Don Swayze) is a werewolf member of Coot's pack until killed by Jessica whilst leading an attack on her and Bill, on orders from Russell.
- Melinda Mickens (portrayed by J. Smith-Cameron) is Sam's biological mother who gave him up for adoption. She is also the mother of Tommy and the wife of Joe Lee. She is seen as a poor mother, who tries to use Sam to get things from him. She is a shifter, like her sons. It is revealed that she is scared to leave Joe Lee, since it is him that had previously pushed her into dogfighting for money and now she expects Tommy to do the same because she is too old. She apparently dies at Tommy's hand while trying to come between Tommy and Joe Lee as they fight.
- Joe Lee Mickens (portrayed by Cooper Huckabee) is Sam's biological father, who was serving time in jail when Sam was born. He is also the father of Tommy and husband to Melinda. He tries to use Sam for money while pretending to be a caring father. He tries to hide from Sam the fact that he forces Tommy in to dogfights in order to make money. He dies at Tommy's hand after Joe Lee tries to recapture Tommy and make him fight again in the 4th season.
- Calvin Norris (portrayed by Gregory Sporleder) is the head of the inbred Norris clan, managing the family's drug business. He strongly opposes the budding relationship between his daughter, Crystal, and Jason Stackhouse, demanding that Crystal marry her brother/cousin Felton. He is shot dead by Felton, moments before the DEA attacks their home.
- Debbie Pelt (portrayed by Brit Morgan) is a werewolf and Alcide's ex-girlfriend. She became engaged to Coot and joined his pack, which was supplied with V by Russell Edgington. After feeding on Bill Compton's blood, Debbie threatened Sookie, but was stopped by Tara. Alcide fatally shot Coot, leading Debbie to vow revenge. Debbie later led a werewolf attack on Sookie's house at Russell's command. After a fight, Sookie scarred Debbie and forced her out. In Season 4, Debbie reconciled with Alcide and became sober, but suspected his feelings for Sookie. She almost left Alcide for her new pack master, Marcus, but Alcide killed Marcus and broke up with and abjured her. Seeking revenge, Debbie later attempted to shoot Sookie. Tara pushed Sookie out of the way, taking the shot to the head. In retaliation, Sookie kills Debbie while Debbie begs for her life on the floor.
- Felton Norris (portrayed by James Harvey Ward) is Crystal's brutal brother/cousin/fiancé and a frontman in the Norris family drug business. He is violent and frequently beats Crystal when she strays from him. Just before the DEA raid the town Felton reveals he is addicted to V. In the season three finale, he forces Crystal to leave town with him, after shooting their father. He is seen again in Episode 2 of Season 4 when it is revealed he and Crystal have kidnapped Jason in order to turn him into a were-panther. He is ambushed and killed by Jason while trying to recapture Jason after Jason escapes the bed that the Hotshot were-panthers tied him to in an effort to add new bloodlines to the in-bred Hotshot community.
- Summer (portrayed by Melissa Rauch) is the sweet girl next door who has had a crush on Hoyt for a long time. After his breakup with Jessica, she, with help from Maxine, becomes his new girlfriend. She is shown to be opposed to vampires, hence attaining Maxine's approval. Eventually she has her heart crushed when Hoyt returns to Jessica. She has a very upbeat talkative personality, loving dolls and show tunes and talks constantly. Hoyt finds it hard to stand her but admits that it is better than being alone. It is something of a visual gag that Summer at 5'0" is nearly a foot and half shorter than the 6'5" Hoyt.
- Don Bartolo (portrayed by Del Zamora) is the grandfather to Jesús, and a brujo or shaman, who lives in Mexico. Don Bartolo attempted to teach Jesús the ways of being a brujo, but Jesús' mother would not allow it, and Jesús was never allowed to see his grandfather again. Don Bartolo is first shown in a flashback when Jesús was a young boy. Seen later in current times, he is older, grayer, yet still a mysterious force to be dealt with.
- Claudine Crane (portrayed by Lara Pulver) was a faerie first introduced in "Hitting the Ground". She had stated that she, and others like her, had protected and, on occasion, saved Sookie from danger. Her first appearances were in a dream realm Sookie, while being comatose after getting drained, and Bill, after ingesting faerie blood, visit. She later appears when she gets Sookie to Faerie, a realm inhabited by faeries and part-faeries, which Sookie escapes from, after learning the faeries' true intentions with her and other part-faeries. Claudine is drained and killed by the amnesiac Eric after she comes back to the human realm to get Sookie back to Faerie.

==== Introduced in season four ====
Listed in order of first appearances.

- Portia Bellefleur (portrayed by Courtney Ford) is Andy Bellefleur's cousin and a successful attorney. She has business dealings with Bill Compton, which develop into a sexual relationship. Bill breaks the relationship off when he discovers that Portia is one of his descendants, which he considers incestuous. Portia was far more reluctant to end the relationship, so Bill glamours her into being afraid of him.
- Antonia Gavilán de Logroño (portrayed by Paola Turbay), along with Marnie, was the main antagonist of the fourth season. A powerful witch and necromancer from late sixteenth-century Logroño, Spain, she became a necromancer to save her village from fever. She also served as healer and midwife. She was fed upon by vampires masquerading as priests in the local Roman Catholic church, raped by the vampire Luis (now on of Bill's sheriffs in Louisiana), and burned at the stake in 1610 during the Spanish Inquisition. As she was burning to death, Antonia and her fellow witches cast a spell to destroy all nearby vampires within twenty miles of Logroño by bringing them into the sun. Antonia repeats this spell in Bon Temps four centuries later, possessing Marnie's body inside Bill's compound. Disheartened by the collateral damage, she leaves Marnie's body. However, Marnie convinces her to re-bond to continue the war and use her as a source of power. After Marnie kills a member of the coven, Antonia sees that she has become evil and attempts leaves again, but Marnie uses a binding spell to pull her back. Jesús ultimately frees Antonia, breaking all her spells. In the season 4 finale, Antonia returns to comfort, forgive, and ease Marnie's passage to the afterlife.
- Marcus Bozeman (portrayed by Dan Buran), the werewolf pack leader of Shreveport, urges Alcide to join his pack. After Marcus involves Debbie, Alcide eventually joins. Marcus sees potential in Alcide but warns the pack to avoid the vampire-witch war. Revealed as Luna's ex-husband, Marcus warns Sam Merlotte to stay away from her. When he finding Tommy instead of Sam at Merlotte's, Marcus demands Sam meet him at his shop. There, Marcus tells Sam to stay away from Luna. When Sam blames his brother, Marcus and his wolves beat up Sam, but are shocked when Sam shifts into Tommy. After Tommy dies, Sam vows vengeance for his brother. Marcus later visits Debbie to question Alcide's loyalty and offers to help her with her lack of desire for children. Alcide kills Marcus during a confrontation at his and Debbie's house.
- Naomi (portrayed by Vedette Lim) is Tara's girlfriend from New Orleans. She met Toni, the name Tara was using, cage-fighting. After receiving mail addressed to Tara Thornton, she travels to Bon Temps to confront Toni/Tara. After making up with Tara, Pam tries to kill them out of anger, and Tara tells her that she will not have her blood on her hands and tells her to leave.
- Mavis (portrayed by Nondumiso Tembe) was an African-American, Creole woman during the early 20th century. In flashbacks the story of her death is told: she was having an affair with a married white man. After she had his child, he killed the baby. When she found out, she grieved and then tried to attack him, but he then killed her. Bent on seeing her baby one last time, she doesn't find rest and wanders as a spirit, showing herself to Mikey Bellefleur and Lafayette. After possessing Lafayette, the matter is resolved, and with the help of Jesús, she leaves in peace with the spirit of her baby.

==== Introduced in season five ====
Listed in order of first appearances.

- Martha Bozeman (portrayed by Dale Dickey) is the mother of the pack master Marcus, who was killed by Alcide at the end of season 4. As Emma's grandmother, she claims to simply want to be a part of Luna's daughter's life, believing Emma to be a werewolf rather than a shifter.
- Rosalyn Harris (portrayed by Carolyn Hennesy) is a chancellor of the Authority. She was present at Russell Edgington's execution where she witnessed his escape and the brutal demise of Guardian Roman Zimojic. She's faithful to the Authority's path to mainstreaming. However, after witnessing Dieter's demise at the hands of Russell for speaking against them, she, Bill and Eric join the Sanguinistas in order to protect themselves. After drinking the blood of Lilith, she becomes a full believer of Lilith, and takes it very seriously. In the season 5 finale, Sam shape shifts into a fly and enters her mouth and shifts back into a human, blowing her up.
- Kibwe Akinjide (portrayed by Peter Mensah) is a chancellor of the Authority and appears to be in charge of the Authority's bodyguards. After arriving to retrieve Russell Edgington, Kibwe brutally murders all of the humans Russell had yet to feed, including Alcide's co-worker Doug. He is present at the execution of Russell Edgington and witnesses Russell's escape and staking of Guardian Roman Zimojic. He reveals himself to be a true Sanguinista after Roman's death. When Bill slips into a religious fervor after having visions of Lilith, Bill secretly decapitates Kibwe when he finds out she has appeared to him as well.
- Dieter Braun (portrayed by Christopher Heyerdahl) is a chancellor of the Authority and appears to be in charge of the Authority's security camera system and UV lights in the cell blocks. As he watches Nora in her cell praying to Lilith, he proclaims out loud that the Vampire Bible is nothing but a book, for he knew the guy who wrote it, and he was high when he did. It is unknown if he was gloating or telling the truth. His true alliance remains with the Authority. He is present at Russell Edgington's execution, where he witnesses Russell's escape and Roman's brutal demise. Afterwards, when the chancellors chose to follow the path of Sanguinistas, he screams blasphemy and Russell rips his head off.
- Alexander Drew (portrayed by Jacob Hopkins) is a chancellor of the Authority. Alexander Drew was turned vampire when he was just a child and has remained that for years. He helped Roman Zimojic when he began to mainstream with other humans. Their close relationship came to an end when Nora Gainsborough revealed her true alliance with the Sanguinista, and ratted out Chancellor Drew as well. The Authority find a video on his laptop of him feeding off a human woman, claiming that she's nothing but food. The video was sent by him to known enemies of the Authority with the encrypted message "In secrecy and solidarity". Chancellor Drew is staked by Roman in front of everyone as he tries to explain himself.
- Molly (portrayed by Tina Majorino) is an employee of the Authority and the inventor of the iStake, a device that is strapped directly over the heart of its potential victim and delivers a lethal projectile when remotely triggered or tampered with. She was turned in her 20s. When Bill and Eric are tasked with locating Russell Edgington, she outfits them with iStakes that are to be triggered if they fail. She is unsympathetic to the Sanguinistas who have taken over the Authority and is sentenced to the True Death after a futile attempt to escape with Eric and Nora. She denounces the Sanguinistas before being executed with her invention.

== See also ==
- List of The Southern Vampire Mysteries characters
