= A Touch of Dead =

Short story collection by Charlaine Harris

- Cover
- Author: Charlaine Harris
- Language: English
- Series: The Southern Vampire Mysteries
- Genre: Fantasy, Mystery, Gothic, Romance
- Publisher: Ace Books
- Publication date: October 6, 2009
- Publication place: United States
- Media type: Print (Hardcover, Paperback)(N/A) e-Book (Kindle); Audio Book (CD)
- Pages: 208 (Hardcover)
- ISBN: 978-0-441-01783-6
- OCLC: 311775713
- Dewey Decimal: 813/.54 22
- LC Class: PS3558.A6427 T68 2009
- Preceded by: Dead and Gone
- Followed by: Dead in the Family

A Touch of Dead is a collection of short stories from Charlaine Harris's series The Southern Vampire Mysteries. This title was released on October 6, 2009. This book only contains the short stories Harris has published in which Sookie Stackhouse is present.

== Stories ==
- “Fairy Dust” from Powers of Detection (October 2004) ISBN 0-441-01197-7
- “Dracula Night” from Many Bloody Returns (September 2007) Hardcover ISBN 0-441-01522-0
- “One Word Answer” from Bite (December 2004) ISBN 0-515-13970-X
- “Lucky” from Unusual Suspects (December 2008) ISBN 0-441-01637-5
- “Gift Wrap” from Wolfsbane and Mistletoe (October 2008) Hardcover ISBN 0-441-01633-2

=== Fairy Dust ===
"Fairy Dust" is a short story and extension of The Southern Vampire Mysteries. Published in Powers of Detection. It introduces another one of Sookie's fairy cousins, Claude, and the deceased third triplet Claudette. Claude and Claudine are recurring characters in later books of the series.

Plot summary

In "Fairy Dust", Sookie is working at Merlottes when Claudine the fairy comes in and asks Sookie to read the minds of some human guests of her brother Claude, who is also a fairy. Later, at Claude and Claudine's home in Monroe, she finds three people tied up in the house. Everyone involved (except Claudine) is associated with Hooligans, an exotic dancing establishment. Claude, who dances, tells Sookie that they believe that one of the people murdered their triplet Claudette while she was working at the club earlier that night. Claude explains that Claudette came to her siblings in spirit form to tell them of her death. Using her telepathy, Sookie interviews each suspect to discover the guilty party.

Characters

Main characters

- Sookie Stackhouse: Human, telepath and barmaid of a local bar.
- Bill Compton: Vampire and Sookie's former boyfriend.

Non-recurring characters

- Ben Simpson: A blond man that works at Hooligans as an exotic dancer. He explains that his stage name Barry Barber and that he enjoys shaving clients. Had a relationship with Claudette but was angry with her because she told him that he was inadequate in bed.
- Rita Child: Current owner of Hooligans. Disliked Claudette.
- Jeff Pocket: Bouncer at Hooligans. Former lover of Claude, he hated Claudette for telling Claude to end the relationship with him.

=== Dracula Night ===
"Dracula Night" is a short story and extension of The Southern Vampire Mysteries. Published in Many Bloody Returns. This story does not affect the storylines in the Southern Vampires novels.

Plot summary

Eric's vampire bar, Fangtasia, throws a party each year for the vampire observance of Dracula Night, in honor of the infamous Count Dracula. According to legend, the Count will choose one lucky party from all over the world to grace with his presence. The book characters are amused by Eric's childlike hope that the Count will appear at his party, just like Linus of the Peanuts comic hopes in vain to greet the Great Pumpkin.

Characters

Main characters

- Sookie Stackhouse: Human, telepath and barmaid of a local bar.
- Bill Compton: Vampire and Sookie's former boyfriend.
- Eric Northman: Vampire sheriff of Area Five of Louisiana. He hosts a party celebrating the turning of Dracula into a Vampire.

=== One Word Answer ===
"One Word Answer" is a short story and extension of The Southern Vampire Mysteries. Published in Bite. It introduces the topic of Hadley's death, which kicks off the events in the sixth Vampire Mysteries book, Definitely Dead.

Plot summary

In "One Word Answer", the mysterious Mr. Cataliades shows up in a limousine at Sookie's home bringing the news of her cousin Hadley's death. The rebellious Hadley had not been in touch with the family in years, so they did not know she had become a vampire several years ago. Nor did they know that she was the lover of the vampire Queen of Louisiana, Sophie-Anne Leclerq. It seems that Waldo, a former lackey of the Queen, was jealous of Hadley's position, so he lured her to a cemetery and killed her. Mr. Cataliades informs Sookie that Waldo has been caught, and that his punishment is in Sookie's hands - she must decide. Her answer surprises him, and Sookie notices that it also surprises the hidden occupant of the limousine: the Queen.

Characters

Main characters

- Sookie Stackhouse: Human, telepath and barmaid of a local bar.
- Bill Compton: Vampire and Sookie's former boyfriend.

Recurring characters

- Sophie-Anne Leclerq: The vampire Queen of Louisiana, and Hadley's former lover.
- Mr. Cataliades: A lawyer who works for Sophie-Anne Leclerq, and frequently conducts business for her, his half-demon nature is not revealed in this story.
- Bubba: Bubba is Elvis Presley in vampire form.

Non-recurring characters

- Waldo: A former lackey of Sophie-Anne, he was violently jealous of Hadley's position as the Queen's lover.

=== Lucky ===
Two characters from this story are mentioned in passing in a later book, but this story does not affect the storylines in the Southern Vampires novels.

Plot summary

Insurance agent Greg Aubert asks Sookie (and her witch friend Amelia) to investigate a break-in at his office. He is concerned that someone will discover that he uses magic spells to protect his property and his clients. Amelia and Sookie discover that the break-in was just Greg's daughter and her secretive boyfriend, who is actually a newly turned vampire. However, Sookie learns that two other agents in town have had break-ins, and all are getting excessive amounts of claims which may drive them out of business. It seems that Greg's spells have been using up all the luck in town.

Characters

Main characters

- Sookie Stackhouse: Human, telepath and barmaid of a local bar.
- Bill Compton: Vampire and Sookie's former boyfriend.

Recurring characters

- Amelia Broadway: Witch rooming with Sookie.

Non-recurring characters

- Greg Aubert: An insurance salesman.

=== Gift Wrap ===
"Gift Wrap" is a short story and extension of The Southern Vampire Mysteries. This story does not affect the storylines in the Southern Vampires novels, although in a later book Sookie has a vague memory of these events.

Plot summary

In "Gift Wrap", Sookie finds herself alone for Christmas. Her brother and closest friends each have their own plans, and she perversely chose not to ask other friends for an invitation. She recalls that she heard a noise in the woods the night before, so she trudges out to investigate. She finds Preston, a naked, muddy and bloody man, who is nevertheless very attractive. To save him from further injury, she brings Preston back to her house and shields him from the Weres who come looking for him. When he starts kissing her, he tells her to pretend she found him gift-wrapped under the tree, and she succumbs to his charm. On Christmas Day, she is relieved to find a note saying he is gone. Her great-grandfather Niall Brigant turns up on her doorstep, surprising her with his company. In the woods behind the house, Preston and a Were chat about Niall hiring them to give Sookie a pleasant Christmas Eve, tailoring the scenario to her personality, and using a bit of fairy magic to attract her.

Characters

Main character

- Sookie Stackhouse: Human, telepath and barmaid of a local bar.

Recurring characters

- Niall Brigant: A fairy and Sookie's mysterious great-grandfather, who turns up sporadically.

Non-recurring characters

- Preston: An injured man that Sookie finds in the woods, not knowing that he is a fairy.
