= Deadlocked (novel) =

2012 novel by Charlaine Harris

- Cover of Deadlocked
- Author: Charlaine Harris
- Language: English
- Series: The Southern Vampire Mysteries
- Genre: Fantasy, Mystery, Gothic, Romance
- Publisher: Ace Books
- Publication date: May 1, 2012
- Publication place: United States
- Media type: Print (hardcover)
- Pages: 327 (Hardcover)
- ISBN: 1-937007-44-8
- OCLC: 747529893
- Preceded by: Dead Reckoning
- Followed by: Dead Ever After

Deadlocked is a 2012 urban fantasy novel by American author Charlaine Harris and is the twelfth and penultimate book in her The Southern Vampire Mysteries. The book was released on May 1, 2012 by Ace Books.

== Synopsis ==
The novel begins with Sookie embroiled in the consequences of the events of the previous novel. Felipe de Castro, Vampire King of Louisiana, Arkansas, and Nevada, has come to town to investigate the mysterious death of his representative in Louisiana, Victor, who was killed by Eric, with the help of Bill, Sookie, Pam, and several others. A dead woman is found on the lawn of Eric's house while he is having a party in honor of Felipe, embroiling Sookie and her vampire friends in a police investigation. Meanwhile, Sookie's fairy great-grandfather, Niall, visits in order to investigate who placed a spell on his son, Dermot, to make him mad. He takes Claude back to the fairy realm with him, while Sookie contends with the powerful magical object given by her half-fairy grandfather, Fintan, to her grandmother, and then in turn left to Sookie. It can grant the possessor a great magical wish on behalf of someone they love, and it appears that someone has been searching for it and may stop at nothing to possess it.

In addition, Sookie could be facing the end of her relationship to Eric. She catches him feeding on the woman who is soon found dead on his lawn, and who was laced in fairy blood and was purposely sent to Eric in an attempt to frame him and for Sookie to find out; she has to contend with the final command of his maker, Appius Livius Ocella, for Eric to marry Freyda, Vampire Queen of Oklahoma. She also has werewolf troubles, as Sam is dating Jannalynn, enforcer for Alcide's Long Tooth Pack, and Jannalynn is out to get Sookie.

== Reception ==
Critical reception for Deadlocked was mixed. Publishers Weekly called the book "intriguing" while Kirkus Reviews wrote that it was a "dull, overly complicated entry in the swampy gothic romance that feeds fans and starves newcomers." A reviewer for Clutch panned the novel, saying that they had trouble finishing it and that Deadlocked is the "penultimate book in the series and, to be frank, the end can’t come soon enough."

== See also ==
- The Southern Vampire Mysteries
- List of The Southern Vampire Mysteries characters
