= Alcide Herveaux =

Fictional character from The Southern Vampire Mysteries

- The Southern Vampire Mysteries; True Blood character
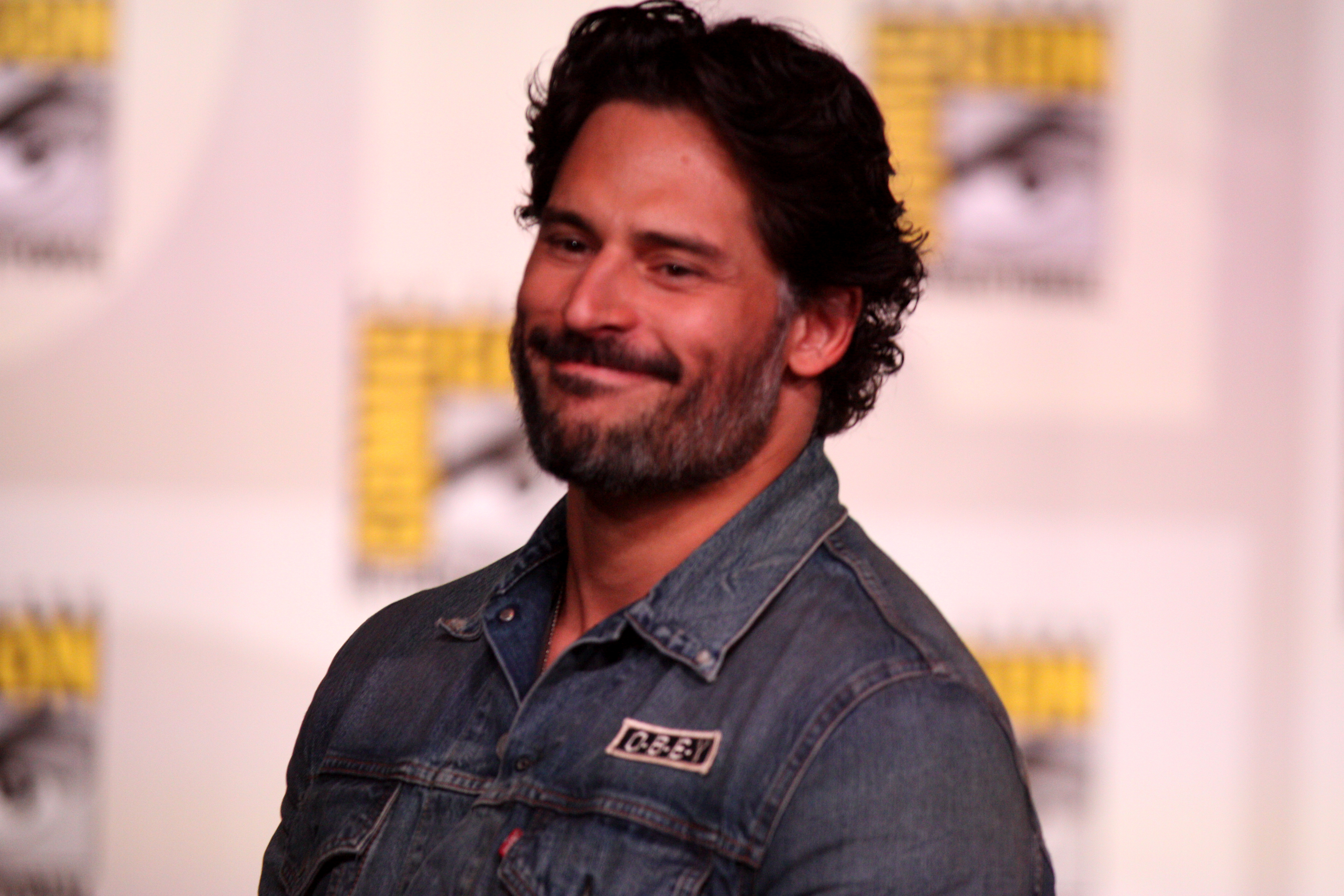
- True Blood actor Joe Manganiello in 2012
- First appearance: Novel: Club Dead; Television: "It Hurts Me Too"
- Last appearance: Novel: Dead in the Family; Television: "Fire in the Hole"
- Created by: Charlaine Harris
- Adapted by: Alan Ball (True Blood)
- Portrayed by: Joe Manganiello; Blake Michael (younger); Thunder (wolf)

In-universe information
- Species: Werewolf
- Gender: Male
- Occupation: "Herveaux Contracting" Manager
- Family: Jackson Herveaux (father); Grace Herveaux (mother); Janice Herveaux (sister); Debbie Pelt (ex-fiancee)
- Nationality: American

Alcide Herveaux is a fictional character in The Southern Vampire Mysteries book series, written by author Charlaine Harris. He first appears in the third novel, Club Dead. In True Blood, the HBO television adaptation, Alcide is portrayed by actor Joe Manganiello.

Alcide is a "were" (or full-blooded werewolf) who owns a construction company with his father in Jackson, Mississippi.

== Backstory and abilities ==
Alcide is characterized as a loyal, respectful man who, unlike many other werewolves, controls his nature and prefers to live as a lone wolf.

Alcide's father, Jackson Herveaux, was the former packmaster (or alpha wolf) of Jackson, Mississippi, in the novels. Jackson initiated Alcide and his longtime girlfriend Debbie Pelt into the pack, teaching them to put the needs of the pack before their own. Jackson is later abjured (or banished) for stealing from the pack. Alcide takes over his father's debt to the vampire Eric Northman, eventually working as a bodyguard for Sookie Stackhouse following the kidnapping of vampire Bill Compton.

In The Southern Vampire Mysteries, Alcide is described as a tall man with green eyes, olive skin, and thick black hair. Alcide's considerable size and strength makes him physically stronger than humans, were panthers, and most werewolves. Though he can easily overpower newborn vampires, older vampires are still stronger and faster than him, even when Alcide is in wolf form. However, consuming vampire blood (“V”) makes him nearly unstoppable, exceeding the strength of other weres on V.

As a werewolf, Alcide has enhanced abilities, including a strong sense of smell even in human form. He is a skilled tracker who can shift at will between human and wolf forms, except during spontaneous full moon transformations.

== Storylines ==
=== The Southern Vampire Mysteries ===
Alcide Herveaux is introduced in the third novel, Club Dead, when ordered by Eric Northman to help Sookie Stackhouse find the kidnapped Bill Compton. Although Sookie and Alcide share a romantic attraction, Alcide remains involved with his on-again, off-again girlfriend, Debbie Pelt.

In Dead to the World, Alcide learns that Debbie participated in Bill Compton’s torture. He abjures her from the Shreveport werewolf pack. Seeking revenge, Debbie attempts to murder Sookie but is killed by her in self-defense. Alcide realizes Sookie is responsible for Debbie's death after recognizing her scent at Sookie's house; this discovery creates a rift between them.

During the fifth novel, Dead as a Doornail, Alcide involves Sookie in the competition for pack leadership between his father and Patrick Furnan. Alcide wants Sookie to use her telepathic abilities because he suspects Furnan will cheat. In the second round, the endurance test, Sookie reveals that Patrick is cheating. The judges determine that Furnan has lost two of three challenges and change the third and final test to a fight to the death. Furnan wins the battle, killing Alcide's father and assuming leadership of the Long Tooth pack. In his grief and anger over the loss of his father, Alcide blames Sookie for failing him.

Later, Alcide dates Maria-Star Cooper in From Dead to Worse until an unidentified assassin brutally kills her. Sookie is attacked twice by unknown weres, and other pack members are murdered or disappear. The Long Tooth pack becomes severely divided, with members blaming each other and war appearing inevitable. Sookie mediates between the two factions and uncovers that the assassinations have been caused by a separate pack led by Priscilla Hebert, the sister of Patrick Furnan's right-hand man. Priscilla's pack lost their home in Hurricane Katrina and want the Long Tooth/Shreveport territory for themselves. A battle ensues, resulting in the deaths of Patrick Furnan and most of Priscilla's pack. Alcide then assumes leadership of the Long Tooth pack.

In the tenth book, Dead in the Family, Alcide arranges for the pack's monthly hunt to take place on Sookie's property. When the weres find unusual tracks, they follow them only to discover a murdered werewolf. Alcide's girlfriend, Annabelle, confesses to having cheated with the deceased werewolf. Alcide subsequently calls upon Sookie to use a shaman potion to identify possible traitors within the pack.

=== True Blood ===
When first introduced in Season 3 ("Fire in the Hole"), Alcide Herveaux remains fairly consistent with his character in The Southern Vampire Mysteries although his storyline diverges somewhat significantly.

Loosely based on the events of Club Dead, Alcide first appears introduced when Eric Northman tasks him with protecting Sookie. Alcide's ex-fiancée, Debbie Pelt, left him for Jackson packmaster Cooter. At Lou Pine's, a werewolf bar, Debbie tells Alcide she's happier now than when she was with his "pussy pack." She and her current fiancé, Cooter, are addicted to vampire blood.

Later on in the season, Sookie, Tara, and Alcide find a nearly dead Bill captured by his "maker" Lorena. Debbie walks in with a gun, and Alcide and Debbie argue about their relationship. As the scuffle escalates, Tara disarms Debbie. When Cooter attacks, Alcide kills him. Debbie, enraged, threatens Alcide, but he locks her inside and flees with Sookie and Tara. Debbie later hunts down and fights Sookie, but is forced to run away.

With Debbie sober, Alcide and Debbie reconcile in Season 4. However, jealousy over Sookie prompts Debbie's relapse and an affair with packmaster Marcus Bozeman. Alcide kills Marcus discovering that he has abducted his daughter, Emma, from his ex-wife Luna. Hurt by her betrayal, Alcide renounces Debbie. Debbie later attempts to murder Sookie, who kills her in self-defense.

In Season 5 and Season 6, Alcide prepares to challenge the current Shreveport packmaster, JD Carson, and become the new leader. He reluctantly accepts the role when packmaster JD Carson's poor leadership (and addiction to “V”) led the Shreveport pack to servitude under vampire Russell Edgington.

As packmaster, Alcide behaves uncharacteristically aggressively but retains some sense of morality. The pack begins to distrust him when he tries to stop them from killing members of the human organization Vampire Unity Society (VUS). When VUS survivor Nicole Wright escaped, with Sam Merlotte's help, Alcide chooses to deceive his pack rather than kill his friends. Rikki Naylor, his then-girlfriend, exposes his actions and challenges him for the role of packmaster. Alcide wins but refused to kill Rikki and resigns. In his final act as packmaster, Alcide saves Nicole and her mother from the pack and returns them to Sam before reverting to his old life as a lone wolf.

At the end of the sixth season, Alcide and Sookie start a romantic relationship after a long friendship. He is shot to death by human vigilantes while saving Sookie in the third episode of Season 7.

== Casting and reception ==
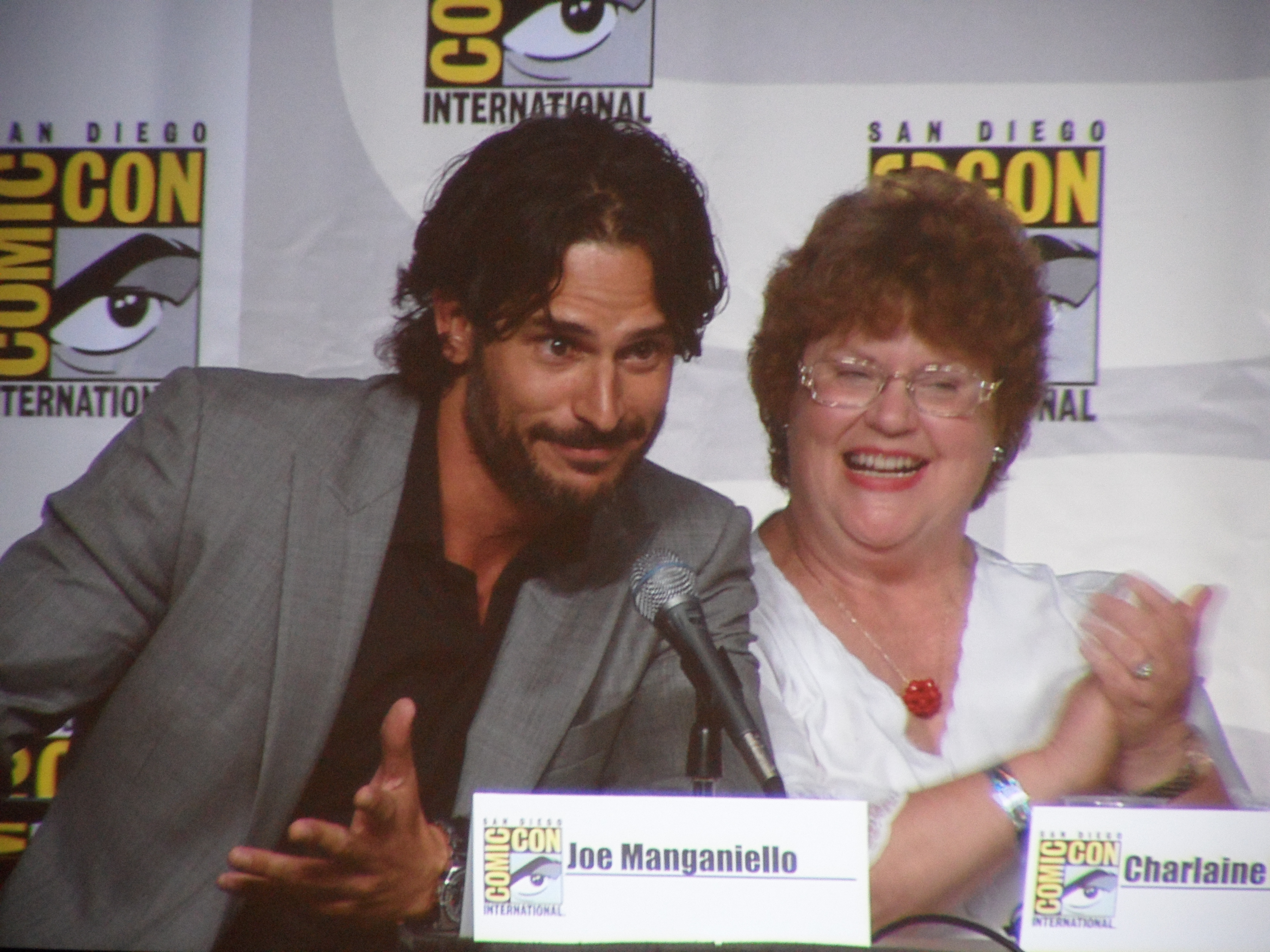
Actor Joe Manganiello and author Charlaine Harris at the 2010 Comic-Con International.

There had been a fan-run internet campaign advocating for Joe Manganiello to play Alcide. Interested in True Blood, Manganiello originally came in to read for Cooter, the werewolf leader of a biker gang. Showrunner Alan Ball asked the casting director to invite him back to audition for the part of Alcide.

While waiting for a chemistry read with lead actress Anna Paquin, Manganiello was offered a series regular role on One Tree Hill. "They hurried up and wrote the third episode so that they could give me that material," Manganiello explained. "I was pulling into my driveway at home, and the phone rang, and it was my agent [and manager]. And they were like, 'You got it.'"

Written as a guest star, Alcide was originally intended to only appear in six episodes during the third season. Following positive reception from fans and critics, the role was expanded to series regular. "Everyone around me had extended contracts," Manganiello explained on The Wrap. "I guess there was such a response to the character that they had to find something to do with me. The reason I had this five year run was really because of that fan support."

Deborah Ann Woll, who played Jessica Hamby in the series, commented on how Alcide's character explores "male expectation... this idea of 'packmaster' versus a romantic" on the Truest Blood official HBO podcast. "You take this one werewolf who, like Bill Compton, is ashamed of who he is… and he feels isolated because of it. Going back to the way that I got into acting, like I was a jock. But on the inside, I was this empathetic artist," Manganiello replied. "When I found Alcide, it was like, ‘Oh, my God!’ There was so much of me that I could pour into him because he was this big, romantic, empathic, sensitive, but protective and vicious if you came after something he loved or him."

In 2014 and 2024, Manganiello commented on his disappointment with the character's ending. On Andy Cohen's SiriusXM talk show, Manganiello explained: "[The showrunners] never planned for me to be on the show past one season... My character had to get out of the way so that Sookie could wind up settling the A and B plots with Bill and Eric, and the only way to get me out of the way was — spoiler alert — you know, to shoot me in the face. I really felt like there was a lot that was left unexplored."
