= Living Dead in Dallas =

2002 novel by Charlaine Harris

- Cover of Living Dead in Dallas
- Author: Charlaine Harris
- Cover artist: Erika Fusari
- Language: English
- Series: The Southern Vampire Mysteries
- Genre: Fantasy, Mystery, Gothic, Romance
- Publisher: Ace Books
- Publication date: May 2002
- Publication place: United States
- Media type: Print (Hardcover, Paperback) e-Book (Kindle); Audio Book (CD)
- Pages: 291 (Paperback); 304(Hardcover)
- ISBN: 0-441-01673-1
- OCLC: 294965618
- Preceded by: Dead Until Dark
- Followed by: Club Dead

Living Dead in Dallas is the second book in Charlaine Harris's series The Southern Vampire Mysteries. This second novel follows the adventures of telepathic waitress Sookie Stackhouse of Bon Temps, Louisiana, as she is employed by Dallas vampires to use her telepathy to help find their lost companion. Sookie agrees to help investigate the whereabouts of the missing vampire on one condition: any humans found to be involved must be turned over to human law enforcement rather than subjected to vampire justice. In Dallas Sookie Stackhouse has her first encounter with the anti-vampire organization "The Fellowship of the Sun," as well as meeting and learning of the existence of werewolves.

== Plot summary ==
This book opens with Sookie Stackhouse finding the dead body of Lafayette in the backseat of Andy Bellefleur's car, which had been left at Merlotte's the night before. Sookie learns that her friend had recently attended a local sex party. She thinks the members of that group might know something about her friend's murder so she starts "listening" to people's thoughts by using her special mind reading talent while working at the local bar.

In the meantime, Bill Compton, Sookie's vampire boyfriend, informs her that they have been summoned by Eric Northman. As a way to get Eric's attention, a maenad known as Callisto attacks Sookie on their way to Fangtasia, Eric's vampire bar. Sookie's wounds are poisoned, and she is healed by a combination of Dr. Ludwig's special treatment, and blood drainings by Eric, Pam, Chow, and Bill. Sookie is later given a fresh transfusion of human blood. Eric informs Bill and Sookie that they need to go to Dallas to help the local vampire leader, Stan Davis, to find his missing "brother," Farrell, who has not returned to Davis' nest for five days.

The Dallas vampires, Sookie, and Bill learn that The Fellowship of the Sun (FotS) as well as a "renouncer" vampire named Godfrey might be behind the disappearance. Sookie decides to go to the FotS church with Hugo, Stan's human dish washer (although he is a lawyer in his regular human life) and the lover of Stan's "sister," Isabel, in an undercover mission. Sookie discovers that Hugo is a traitor, but her cover is quickly exposed when they meet Steve and Sarah Newlin, and she is badly hurt while trying to escape from the church. She does escape with the help of Luna, a shapeshifter, and Godfrey (who turns out to be a remorseful child molester and killer). After a run-in with more supernaturals, including an undercover doctor at a local hospital and some werewolves, Sookie ends up back at the FotS to be with Godfrey as he "meets the sun." That night at the welcome home party for Farrell, Stan's house is attacked by the FotS and many humans die. Sookie, unable to locate Bill, helps Eric remove a bullet that he took protecting her from the gunfire; he insists the only safe way to remove it is to suck the bullet out. In doing so, she ingests a few drops of his blood inadvertently. Bill returns soon after; he had chased down members of the FotS. He reveals to Sookie that Eric's insistence on sucking out the bullets was just a ruse to get her to ingest some of his blood—now he will have a connection with her. Sookie is furious at Eric. She is also angry at Bill because he killed someone and did not check on her before beginning his pursuit of the FotS. Sookie leaves the house and immediately flies back to Bon Temps.

Back in Bon Temps, Sookie avoids Bill for several weeks during which Bill "dates" Portia Bellefleur, who is trying to find out more about the sex club in an effort to clear her brother Andy of any connection to the murder. After seeing Sookie at a football game with Tara, Benedict "Eggs" Talley (Tara's fiancé), and JB du Rone (another male friend), Bill follows Sookie home and they passionately (and violently) reconcile.

The next day, Sookie is invited to a secret sex party organized by Mike Spencer. Afraid to go alone, Sookie asks Eric to accompany her as Bill is out of town. At the sex party, Sookie is surprised to see her friend Tara and Eggs and learns that Mike and Tom Hardaway murdered Lafayette. The party is interrupted when Bill, Andy Bellefleur, Sam (in collie form), and the maenad Callisto gather in front of the house. The maenad enjoys the drunkenness and lust of the party participants and eventually kills Mike, Tom and his wife, and another local named Jan. Eggs & Andy, under the maenad's spell, recall nothing of the incident - Tara is the only non-supernatural present with any recollection of the events (she was hidden and thus did not fall under the maenad's spell). Bill and Eric burn the house, and Eric glamours Tara so that she will not be able to remember what happened at the sex party.

== See also ==
- Characters of The Southern Vampire Mysteries
- Characters of True Blood
- True Blood

== Television adaptation ==
Living Dead in Dallas has been adapted by HBO into a television series called True Blood. Its storyline forms the basis of True Blood's second season. Its first episode aired on June 14, 2009. Although the main characters and story lines are the same, there are a number of differences between the book and the series:

- In the series, Jason joins the Fellowship of the Sun, forming a major story arc that is very different from his minor role in the novel. In the book, Jason stays in Bon Temps, dating a girl called Liz Barrett.
- Lafayette Reynolds is not killed, but rather Miss Jeanette (a character exclusive to the series) is found murdered. Instead, Eric takes Lafayette prisoner for dealing V and to question about Eddie's disappearance. Lafayette is held in the basement of Fangtasia.
- In the series, Eric's maker is Godric, to whom Eric maintains a deep bond of loyalty and devotion. Godric, while still like Godfrey (see above) a self-tortured renouncer who wishes to meet the sun, is not portrayed as an evil child killer but rather as a compassionate, enlightened sheriff of his area.
- Bill's maker Lorena is reintroduced.
- Bill tries to teach his new progeny, Jessica, how to be a good vampire. Jessica and Hoyt (whose character is very different in the series) start a romantic relationship.
- Season 2 sees the introduction of Sophie-Anne Leclerq, Queen of Louisiana, whereas she does not appear in novel 2, instead appearing in a later book.
- Callisto, the maenad, is introduced as "Maryann Forrester." Maryann is played by actress Michelle Forbes.
- The entire plotline involving the maenad is drastically different in the series from that portrayed in the book. This includes her involvement in the Bon Temps community, her relationship with Tara, and her drive to kill Sam Merlotte.
- Luna is not involved in rescuing Sookie from the Fellowship and no werewolves make an appearance in Dallas.
- A sub-plot involving Sam's romantic relationship with another shapeshifter is exclusive to the TV series.
