= Dead Reckoning (novel) =

2011 novel by Charlaine Harris

- Cover of Dead Reckoning
- Author: Charlaine Harris
- Language: English
- Series: The Southern Vampire Mysteries
- Genre: Fantasy, Mystery, Gothic, Romance
- Publisher: Ace Books (US); Victor Gollancz Ltd. (UK)
- Publication date: May 3, 2011
- Publication place: United States
- Media type: Print (hardcover) e-Book (Kindle); Audio Book (CD)
- Pages: 336 (Hardcover)
- ISBN: 978-0-441-02031-7
- OCLC: 679931000
- Preceded by: Dead in the Family
- Followed by: Deadlocked

Dead Reckoning is a 2011 New York Times Bestselling gothic romance novel by Charlaine Harris and is the eleventh book in her Southern Vampire Mysteries series. The book was released on May 3, 2011 by Ace Books and deals with Sookie discovering more about her heritage and dealing with more supernatural difficulties.

== Plot ==
Old friends and enemies are causing problems for Sookie Stackhouse. Sandra Pelt has a score to settle. Victor Madden, representative of the Vampire King Felipe de Castro, is challenging her lover Eric Northman's position and, in other ways, threatening her friend and employer Sam Merlotte. Great-uncle Dermot and cousin Claude are making themselves at home in Sookie's house in the aftermath of the separation with the faery world, and a visit from Amelia and Bob throws a new wrinkle into her relationship with Eric. Bill Compton admits his continuing love for Sookie, and proves to be a supportive friend. Meanwhile, Sookie is learning more about her grandmother Adele's relationship with her half-fairy grandfather Fintan. And Bubba's back.

== Reception ==
Critical reception for Dead Reckoning was mixed. The Los Angeles Times remarked that the series had "lost some of its sting" and that the book felt "a bit stale". The Seattle PI gave a lukewarm review, stating that it was "not the best in the series" and "a little formulaic" but that "it works". io9 also gave a mixed review, praising Harris's "vampire mythos" but stating that the fae elements were the weakest part of the book and that it was "one of the more forgettable entries" in the series. Publishers Weekly praised the novel, calling it a "solid" book.

== See also ==
- The Southern Vampire Mysteries
- List of The Southern Vampire Mysteries characters
