= List of The Southern Vampire Mysteries characters =

This is a listing of significant characters in Charlaine Harris's The Southern Vampire Mysteries / Sookie Stackhouse novels only. HBO created a television series called True Blood based on the novels.

== Main characters ==
=== Sookie Stackhouse ===
Sookie is the main character of The Southern Vampire Mysteries, and resides in the fictional town of Bon Temps in rural northern Louisiana. In the first novel, Dead Until Dark, she describes herself as being 25 years old, with blonde hair and blue eyes. She also states that her "legs are strong and [her] bosom is substantial... [with] a waspy waistline”. She is written to wear a ladies size 8-10. Sookie, although not highly educated, is well read and has an extensive vocabulary. This is primarily attributed to her affinity for her “word-of-the-day” calendar. Although Sookie appears to be human, she possesses telepathic abilities, which manifested at a very young age. Later she learns she is a fairy-human hybrid. She is able to read most human minds, and after meeting the vampire Bill Compton, learns that she can not “hear” Bill's thoughts. She discovers that while it is possible to read the minds of other supernatural creatures, they do not “broadcast” as clearly as true humans. Sookie lives in her ancestral home, which she inherits from her grandmother, Adele Stackhouse, who is murdered in the first book. She has one sibling, her older brother Jason Stackhouse. In the sixth book, Definitely Dead, Sookie discovers she is part Faerie. Sookie has several Fae relatives, including twin cousins Claude Crane and Claudine Crane, and Great Grandfather Niall Brigant. Sookie works as a barmaid at Merlotte's; a local bar and grill owned by Sam Merlotte. In later novels, Sookie also earns money (mainly by utilizing her telepathic powers) by working for the Vampire Sheriff Eric Northman, and the Vampire Queen of Louisiana, Sophie-Anne Leclerq.

=== Eric Northman ===
Vampire Sheriff of Area Five (one of the vampire districts of Louisiana). The former Viking is over 1,000 years old, and portrayed as a very powerful vampire. As the Sheriff of Area Five, the largest area of the state, he is a powerful player in vampire politics and all vampires living in his area must submit to his authority. He is smart, ruthless, and has a good sense of humor. He loses his memory in Dead to the World due to Hallow Stonebrook who is later killed by Pam. He becomes romantically involved with Sookie in Dead to the World. Later on in All Together Dead he, along with Pam and a few other notable vampires, travel to the Vampire Summit with Sophie Anne Leclerq.

=== Bill Compton ===
A vampire and Confederate veteran of the Civil War, Bill lived in Bon Temps at the time he was made vampire. His wife was named Caroline and they had five children. He was turned into a vampire against his will by Lorena. Bill is the investigator for Area 5, under Eric's supervision. He becomes Sookie's first romantic interest. Later on becoming romantically involved with Selah Pumphrey in the book Definitely Dead, he started dating her to make Sookie jealous. He has a great memory and created a vampire database for the Queen of Louisiana, Sophie Anne Leclerq.

=== Sam Merlotte ===
Sam is a shapeshifter. Unlike weres, who can change into a specific type of animal, Sam can change into any animal he comes in contact with or views a photo of, though he prefers the form of a collie dog because people perceive it as 'friendly'. He is also the owner of Merlotte's, a small bar in Bon Temps, LA. Sam has expressed interest in dating Sookie and has kissed her on more than one occasion. The two went on one date in Dead Until Dark. Sam is always concerned for Sookie's safety. Sam Trammell portrays Sam Merlotte in HBO's television series True Blood. In Dead in the Family, he dates a Were, Jannalynn who later ends up accidentally killing him in a battle. Sam is then brought back to life by Sookie through the "Cluviel Dor", an item given by Sookie's fairy grandfather Fintan as a love token to Adele, Sookie's grandmother.

== Vampire characters ==
=== Alexei Romanov ===
Introduced in Dead in the Family, the character is the vampire incarnation of the historical prince Alexei Nikolaevich, the last Tsarevich of Russia. He was made vampire by Appius Livius Ocella, thus making him Eric Northman's vampire “brother”. He was spoiled while alive due to his hemophilia and his royal position, and was psychologically scarred by the massacre of his entire family in front of him.

After Ocella made him a vampire, he was obligated to become Ocella's lover. This combination of stresses made Alexei mentally unstable and uncontrollable even decades after becoming a vampire.

Before his death, he bonds with Jason because he says Jason reminds him of one of his attendants when he was alive, a man who was kind to him.

=== Andre Paul ===
Andre is Queen Sophie-Anne's second in command and her vampire “offspring”. Sookie considers him very frightening; he will do anything to ensure Sophie-Anne's power. At one point, he makes an attempt to force Sookie to drink his blood in order to have more control over her as he sees what an important employee she could be to Sophie-Anne. Eric steps in to prevent Sookie drinking Andre's blood and Sookie drinks Eric's blood instead. Andre is staked by Quinn in order to free Sookie of his malign control.

=== Appius Livius Ocella ===
Introduced in Dead in the Family, he is Eric Northman's maker. He was a human, a Roman soldier, around the time of Jesus's birth. He first encountered Eric when he lured the human by feigning injury at the side of the road. Attracted by Eric's handsomeness, he turns him and then forces him to be his lover for many years. In the early 20th century, to express his dislike of the Bolsheviks, he converts the last heir of the Russian royal family, but Alexei proves to be a difficult vampire “child”. Appius Livius is killed when Colman, a fairy, accidentally puts a sword through the wounded and immobile Appius Livius while trying to kill Sookie.

Sookie notes that Appius' name is pronounced like the classical Latin, “Appius Liwius Okella”.

=== Bubba ===
Introduced in Dead Until Dark, Bubba is Elvis Presley in vampire form. A morgue attendant who was a vampire and a big fan discovered that the King still had a tiny spark of life left. The misguided vampire decides to bring the king over, but the resulting creature, answering only to “Bubba”, is brain damaged by or before the process. The other vampires treat him as a treasure and give him small jobs to keep him busy and out of the public eye however, occasionally he is seen by humans, resulting in the countless Elvis sightings that litter the tabloids. Bubba prefers cat blood, and does not drink human blood at all. He's always cheerful, goodwill radiating from his fearsome smile. (But never call him Elvis, it agitates him.) He will sing only when he feels like it, and the vamps regard this as a very special event. In the third novel, Club Dead, Sookie says that “though every now and then, he exhibited a streak of shrewdness”; he follows directions quite literally.

=== Charles Twining ===
Charles Twining is an Englishman with an eye patch who was a pirate in his human life. Appearing in the book Dead as a Doornail, he's an employee of Fangtasia, he was sent as a bartender to Merlotte's by Eric as a debt to Sookie. It's later revealed that he's working for Long Shadow's maker, Hot Rain, and was sent to kill Sookie. He set Sookie's house on fire and is later killed by Sookie and assorted bar patrons in Merlotte's.

=== Chow ===
Chow is a member of Louisiana's Area Five vampire district. He is an Asian vampire with a small build and long black hair. He is no more than five foot seven and every inch of his visible skin (except for his face) is covered with intricate yakuza tattoos. He acts as a bartender in Fangtasia some nights, and sits around other nights to let patrons approach him. He is first introduced in the second book, Living Dead in Dallas, as a replacement of Fangtasia’s former bartender, Longshadow. Chow is killed in the fourth book, Dead to the World, when fighting against the coven of witches.

=== Clancy ===
Clancy is a member of Louisiana's Area Five vampire district and the bar manager of Fangtasia. He is described as having red hair and a flirtatious manner with an edge, and becomes bitter and snappish after being abducted and almost completely drained of blood by witches in the fourth novel, Dead to the World. Clancy dies in the ninth novel, Dead and Gone, while protecting Sookie from enemies of her fae great-grandfather, Niall.

Dahlia in Dying for Daylight computer game

=== Dahlia ===
Dahlia Lynley-Chivers is the main character in the computer game Dying for Daylight (aka True Blood 2) and in a constellation of non-Sookie-related—though set in the same fictional universe— short stories. Dahlia is an ancient vampire, whom Sookie Stackhouse only meets briefly in All Together Dead in the role of a respected judge in the court trial during the Vampire Summit. Dahlia is Greek, and she possesses the rare ability to fly. She is friends with Thalia, who also appears in one of Dahlia-centred stories, Bacon.

=== Felipe de Castro ===
The Vampire King of Nevada. The Nevada vampires take over Sophie-Anne's Louisiana and Arkansas territories in the eighth book, From Dead to Worse. Sookie saves his life after he is attacked by Sophie-Anne's child and bodyguard Sigebert.

=== Franklin Mott ===
Vampire and Tara's companion/Sugar Daddy. In the books, he is described as having iron gray hair and a mustache. Sookie thinks he must have been in his fifties or early sixties when he was turned into a vampire. She describes him as being “vigorous and very masculine” and having an Italian accent. In book 5, Dead as a Doornail, he dumps Tara and puts her up as a debt payment to cruel vampire Mickey. He has not appeared in the series since Dead as a Doornail, and something Eric said suggests that Salome killed Franklin for bringing attention to those Vampires trying to 'mainstream'.

=== Freyda ===
Vampire Queen of Oklahoma, Freyda is one of the few females who rules in her own right in the vampire community. She is beautiful, powerful, and intelligent, having risen to her lofty position despite being only about 150 years old, as she explains in Deadlocked. The final command of Eric's maker, Appius Livius Ocella, was that Eric marry Freyda. Together, the two powerful and ambitious vampires could be expected to make a dynamic team that can consolidate their power throughout the United States. Freyda visits Sookie, ostensibly to speak to her about Sookie giving up Eric. Sookie begins to sense danger from Freyda and as a result disinvites her to her house. At the end of Deadlocked, it appears Freyda has won and that Eric will give up Sookie to marry her and move to Oklahoma.

=== Jade Flower ===
Introduced in Definitely Dead, she is ostensibly the bodyguard of Peter Threadgill. She is described as a diminutive Asian woman with a bad haircut, a penchant for wearing red, and fighting with the whacking big sword she wears strapped to her back. She is responsible for the murders of Gladiola and Jake Purifoy. During the battle which took place at Queen Sophie Anne's entertainment estate, Jade is maimed by a vengeful Desmond Cataliades, but ultimately killed by Bill Compton in defense of Sookie.

=== Judith Vardamon ===
Introduced in Dead in the Family, she is Bill's vampire “sibling”. She looks a lot like Bill's human wife, Caroline, and Lorena, noticing Bill's fascination with the human Judith, turns her into a vampire with the thought that she will help to keep Bill by Lorena's side. She is later contacted by Sookie Stackhouse and heals Bill of his silver poisoning. She is attracted to Bill but terrified of Lorena. Sookie helps to reunite them, and with Lorena's death their path to romance is clear. But after a short and happy reunion, they fall out again and she and Bill part ways.

=== Lorena Ball ===
A blood-lusting Vampire and Bill Compton's maker and one-time lover. She is first introduced in the third book, Club Dead. She summoned Bill to Mississippi and captured him in order to learn about his secret project for the queen of Louisiana. She is killed by Sookie while torturing and trying to kill Bill, but she is mentioned in subsequent novels. She is portrayed as being blonde and having brown eyes and a smaller build than Sookie's. In subsequent books, Sookie learns that Bill was going to leave her because Lorena had ordered him to do so. Bill and others (Godric and Russell) have a low opinion of her; Bill left her because of her constant wanton destruction and lack of regard for human life. Godric says that despite having had the time to better herself, she remains 'a savage'- it's no wonder humans hate vampires and he fears for all, when there are creatures like her. Russell says something along the lines of she's unsophisticated. It is expressed in Club Dead by Eric that she is 300 years old.

=== Mickey ===
A rogue sadistic Vampire who refuses to adapt to a society where humans and vampires coexist equally. He is depicted in the novels as slim with narrow shoulders and slicked-back hair. He has long fingernails and a sharp face. Sookie describes his eyes as “cold and hostile as a snake’s.” He forces Sookie's friend, Tara Thornton, into a relationship with him after her former lover, vampire Franklin Mott, loses interest. Sookie asks that Eric help free Tara, which he does in exchange for Sookie revealing the details of what happened while he was cursed with amnesia.

=== Hadley Delahoussaye ===
Sookie’s only first cousin, Hadley is introduced posthumously in Charlaine Harris’ 2005 short story One Word Answer. In her human years, Hadley was popular in high school, a cheerleader, and even Miss Bon Temps. She got involved with drugs and prostitution during her junior year of high school and ran away to New Orleans. In the short story, Sookie learns that Hadley was turned into a vampire by the Queen of Louisiana, Sophie-Anne Leclerq. Waldo, a vampire who was jealous of Hadley's position as a favorite of the Queen, staked Hadley. In the sixth book, Definitely Dead, Sookie goes to New Orleans to deal with Hadley's estate. She learns that Hadley was once married and divorced, and that she had informed the queen about Sookie's mindreading ability. In From Dead to Worse, Sookie learns that Hadley also gave birth to a child, now being raised by her ex-husband. The child, Hunter, also has mind-reading skills, which Sookie is at pains to conceal from anyone else.

=== Palomino ===
Her original name is unknown, but she is a vampire who lives in Shreveport who works at Fangtasia as well as at Victor's casino. She acquired her new name due to her unusual coloration—blonde hair but tawny skin. In Deadlocked, she helps Eric to find Colton and helps to rescue Sookie when she is kidnapped by rogue werewolves.

=== Pam Ravenscroft ===
Vampire. Eric's second in command and progeny (Eric turned her into a vampire). She is described as looking like a young suburban housewife, but mostly as “Alice in Wonderland with fangs.” She is sarcastic and has a special sense of humor. She likes to read Dear Abby. Sookie describes her as one of the very few vampires she would call her friend.

=== Peter Threadgill ===
Vampire King of Arkansas and husband of Sophie-Anne Leclerq. He was killed by Sophie-Anne's child and second-in-command Andre during Peter's failed attempt to take over Louisiana.

=== Russell Edgington ===
Russell is the Vampire King of Mississippi. A small vampire with red hair and a thick southern accent, he is first introduced in the third novel, Club Dead, at the vampire bar Josephine’s (known as Club Dead by the Weres). Described as the perfect southern gentleman, Russell prefers men. Talbot is his steady human companion. In Dead as a Doornail, the fifth book, Sookie learns that he collects the “unusual”. In the seventh novel, All Together Dead he marries the King of Indiana, Bartlette Crowe, and it appears to be a love match (marriages between vampire kings and queens are usually political unions and not a union of love).

=== Sigebert ===
Sigebert (pronounced “SEE-ya-bairt”) is one of two vampire brothers who are bodyguards to Sophie-Anne Leclerq, who is also his maker, the other being Wybert. He is of Saxon origin and was a warrior in his human life. After the fall of the Louisiana regime and takeover by the Nevada vampires, Sigebert attempts to kill the King of Nevada, Felipe de Castro, and Eric Northman. He is eventually subdued and killed with Sookie's help.

=== Sophie-Anne Leclerq ===
Sophie-Anne is the Vampire Queen of Louisiana; a beautiful woman, pale as milk, with reddish brown hair, large and tilted brown eyes. She is a smart and strategic leader within the vampire hierarchy. Despite standing at a petite 5'2", she is one of the oldest, most powerful vampires in North America. She sends Bill to Bon Temps to investigate Sookie's abilities.

In Definitely Dead Sophie-Anne reveals to Sookie that she was born 1,100 years ago, roughly in modern-day northern France. Her village, including her entire human family, was wiped out in a flu epidemic when she was about 12. She was made a vampire about three years later.

Her territory in Louisiana, and especially the lucrative city of New Orleans, is highly coveted among other vampire monarchs. As a result, Sophie-Anne is constantly guarding against plots to usurp her throne and seeking to strengthen her position by acquiring more formidable allies, soldiers and servants.

She is rarely seen committing hands-on acts of violence, usually delegating such tasks to her retainers. However, even other ancient and strong vampires, like Eric, are careful to avoid provoking her ire. One of her unique abilities is to remain close with the vampire “children” over hundreds and thousands of years. The vampires made by Sophie-Anne tend to be fanatically devoted to her and freely confess that they remain with Sophie-Anne out of love, rather than coercion, or exploitation of the maker-offspring bond. She can also communicate telepathically with her children, although the limits of this ability are never clearly defined.

In All Together Dead, Sophie-Anne was put on trial for the murder of her husband, Peter, and his entourage following the failed takeover. Sookie helped proved her innocence with the help of Barry that she was set up by the Fellowship of the Sun.

=== Stan Davis ===
Stan Davis is vampire sheriff of Dallas, and his normal guise is that of a nerd: taped glasses, short sleeved button up shirt, etc. He is first introduced in the second novel, Living Dead in Dallas, when he requests the services of Sookie to help him find his missing nest brother, Farrell. Stan is one of the few vampire minds that Sookie has managed to catch a glimpse of; he is apparently a much older and more worldly vampire than he lets others believe, with his origins somewhere in Eastern Europe. Telepath Barry (the bellboy) Horowitz begins working for him after Stan discovers, in the second novel, that another telepath lives in Dallas. In the seventh book, All Together Dead, Stan had become King of Texas.

=== Thalia ===
Thalia is an ancient Greek vampire. She is so old that she came across Odysseus, who lived on a neighbouring island, “a time or two”.

Thalia first appears in the short story Dracula Night.

She moved to Shreveport after having been expelled from a nest in Illinois for aggressive behaviour. Thalia is described as very small with an extremely white face, tightly waving black hair and a classical profile. She speaks stilted English. Thalia works at 'Fangtasia' in spite of her reluctance to join the outed vampire community. Pam once told Sookie that “when Eric had agreed to let Thalia live in Shreveport, it was the equivalent of keeping a badly trained pit bull tethered in the yard”. She is considered cold, ruthless, and despises humans, which has oddly earned her a large devoted following in the human community, including her own website. Her great age lets her regenerate limbs by attaching a severed one to the wound instead of growing them back.

=== Wybert ===
Wybert (pronounced “WAY-bairt”) is one of two vampire brothers (the other being Sigebert) who are bodyguards to Sophie-Anne Leclerq, who is his maker. He is of Saxon origin and was a warrior in his human life. During a battle between the Louisiana and Arkansas vampires, Wybert is beheaded.

=== Victor Madden ===
Victor is the regent designated to rule Louisiana in the name of King Felipe de Castro. Ambitious, treacherous and vain, Victor does not appear to be satisfied as a mere proxy ruler for Felipe, although he does not risk directly challenging or disobeying his master. Instead he focuses his energy on undermining and attacking Eric, as the only powerful retainer of Queen Sophie-Anne to survive the hostile takeover of the state. Eric and Pam even speculate that Felipe sent him to Louisiana simply to distance Victor from the king's real power base in Las Vegas. While he occasionally uses minions to directly threaten Pam, Sookie or others close Eric, Victor also uses a variety of indirect assaults. In Dead Reckoning (novel), Victor opens two rival nightclubs to siphon business away from Fangtasia and Merlotte's, while attempting to bait Eric into a fight or some other violation of the vampire hierarchy's strict protocols. He's killed by Sookie with the assistance of many of the local vampires.

=== Malcolm ===
First introduced in Dead Until Dark. Was an old friend of Bill's and had 2 vampire companions, Liam and Diane.

=== Liam ===
First introduced in Dead Until Dark as a companion to Malcolm who was an old friend of Bill's and was described as having a buzz cut with a lot of tattoos.

=== Diane ===
First introduced in Dead Until Dark as a companion to Malcolm and Liam.

== Human characters ==
=== Adele Hale Stackhouse ===
She is Sookie and Jason's grandmother, and raised them after their parents were killed during their childhood. She is killed in the first novel by Rene (Arlene's boyfriend) Dead Until Dark. Later in the book series, Sookie learns that Sookie's grandfather is not her biological grandfather. In the eighth book, From Dead to Worse, Sookie meets her great grandfather, Niall Brigant, a fairy prince who tells her that his son, Fintan, is her father's biological father.

Sookie continues to be guided and inspired by her late grandmother's wisdom. Adele's favorite bible quotation was, “Sufficient unto the day is the evil thereof” (Matthew 6:34). She also told Sookie that “a woman—any woman worth her salt—could do whatever she had to.”

=== Alcee Beck ===
He's an African-American detective in Bon Temps and often works with Andy Bellefleur. He's very competent at his job, though he enjoys beating people during interrogations.

Alcee dislikes Sookie and believes completely in her ability to read minds. He particularly resents Sookie because a Were tries to kill Sookie in From Dead to Worse, and to do so, grabs Alcee's wife, endangering her.

=== Andy Bellefleur ===
Andy is a detective in Bon Temps. In the fifth novel, Dead as a Doornail, he starts dating Halleigh Robinson, a young elementary school teacher, and in later novels they get married. Andy knows about Sookie's telepathic abilities but he does not want to accept anything supernatural. He tells Sookie that she and Jason should not be in Bon Temps, calls Sookie a “genetic fluke”, and in general looks down on her and her brother, making him and Sookie antagonists. Also in the fifth novel, Andy shoots Sweetie Des Arts, a bitten shifter, who has been shooting other shifters and weres around Bon Temps. In the second novel, Living Dead in Dallas, Bill discovers that Andy and Portia Bellefleur are his direct descendants (he is their great-great-great grandfather), and anonymously gives them large amounts of money, despite Portia and Andy scorning vampires and the supernatural of any kind. When Bill tells them of the relationship in Dead in the Family, they are at first unhappy but begin to treat him a bit better after they see their grandmother Caroline accepting and even enjoying the connection. In Dead Reckoning (novel) Halleigh is pregnant with a girl who Andy reveals they are planning on naming Caroline Compton Bellefleur. Andy Bellefleur is portrayed by Chris Bauer in the True Blood series.

=== Arlene Fowler ===
She is Sookie's friend and fellow barmaid at Merlotte's. She has been married four times and has two children, Coby and Lisa, whom Sookie often babysits. She is introduced in the first novel, Dead Until Dark, and she disapproves of Sookie's relationships with vampires. Sookie thinks Arlene is occasionally tactless and reminds herself “to reevaluate why Arlene is her friend.” As the series progresses, their friendship sours. Arlene falls under the influence of her latest boyfriend, a member of The Fellowship of the Sun, and turns against Sookie. In Dead and Gone she tries to kill Sookie. Portrayed by Carrie Preston in the True Blood series.

=== Barry Horowitz ===
Human. Telepath. Barry is first introduced in Living Dead in Dallas as a timid young bellboy at the vampire hotel in Dallas, Silent Shores. Sookie quickly notices that he is telepathic, but he does not want anyone to know about his abilities, despite Sookie's joy at meeting him, as she had never before encountered another telepath. He is inadvertently “outed” by Sookie when she calls upon him telepathically to rescue her from her kidnapping by the Fellowship of the Sun. Sookie meets him again at the Vampire Summit conference in the seventh novel, All Together Dead. She finds him to be more confident. Now he is known as “Barry Bellboy” and currently works for the King of Texas, Stan Davis. Barry enjoys money and buys himself designer clothes. He admits to fantasizing about being in a romantic relationship with Sookie, but he realizes that is not to be when they meet again at the Summit, and he ends up being wary of Sookie and some of the things she has done. He is the first to discover the plot to bomb the hotel where the summit is held. After the devastating explosion, he and Sookie help rescue workers search for survivors in the rubble. The two discover that when they hold hands, their telepathic abilities are magnified. At the end of this novel, they part on rocky terms because of the differences in their moral and ethical beliefs. Barry is portrayed by Chris Coy in the True Blood series.

In Deadlocked, Sookie learns that Barry is the great-great-great grandson of Mr. Cataliades. The part-demon lawyer looks after Barry, but in secret; Barry does not know of the relationship. It is for that reason that he has the gift of telepathy.

Barry also appears as a character in the novel Day Shift, part of the Midnight, Texas trilogy.

=== Bobby Burnham ===
First introduced in All Together Dead, Bobby is the daytime assistant of Eric Northman. Bobby is characterized as being one of the humans that has a genuine dislike of Sookie Stackhouse for her telepathic abilities. Bobby dies in Dead in the Family and has not been featured in the HBO television series True Blood.

=== Bud Dearborn ===
Sheriff of Bon Temps, superior officer to Andy Bellefleur. He often acts suspicious of Sookie Stackhouse, but treats her and her brother better than Andy Bellefleur does. He is portrayed by William Sanderson in the HBO series True Blood.

=== “Eggs” Benedict Talley ===
Fiancé of Tara Thornton and native of Bon Temps. Survivor of the maenad who visits Bon Temps in Living Dead in Dallas, but is mentioned to have died later in Dead as a Doornail in a fire due to his heavy drinking habit. In True Blood, Eggs and Tara still enjoy a romantic relationship, but the circumstances are slightly different including the fact that he is not a Bon Temps native. In the show, he is shot and killed by Jason while trying to turn himself in to Andy Bellefleur for murder. When Jason happens upon the scene it appears that Eggs is threatening Andy with a large knife. He is portrayed by Mehcad Brooks.

=== Colton ===
A human who helps Eric and the other vampires kill Victor, due to his anger at Victor for ruining the lives of his family. Colton ends up kidnapped in Deadlocked.

=== Dawn Green ===
First introduced in Dead Until Dark as a waitress that worked at Merlotte's with Sookie until she was murdered by Rene Lenier. She had dated Jason but they were on the outs. In True Blood, she was played by Lynn Collins.

=== Denise and Mack Rattray ===
First introduced in Dead Until Dark. Drug users as well as vampire drainers. Sookie helps Bill Compton to escape that Rattrays trying to drain him in Merlotte's parking lot the first night they met. Sookie wrapped a chain around Mack's neck and they ran off. The next night, they came to Merlotte's when Sookie got off of work and tried to kill her. Bill Compton saved her from being killed and gave her his blood. They are played by James Parks and Karina Logue in True Blood.

=== Halleigh Robinson ===
First introduced in Dead as a Doornail, Halleigh is an elementary school-teacher and Andy Bellefleur's love-interest. She is portrayed as an attractive woman with short earlobe-length brown hair and brown eyes. Halleigh and Andy eventually marry. In Dead Reckoning (novel) Halleigh is pregnant with a girl who Andy reveals they plan to name Caroline Compton Bellefleur.

=== Hoyt Fortenberry ===
He is Jason's childhood friend, though their relationship grows apart throughout the book series as Jason and Hoyt do not have a lot of things in common. Later in the books, Hoyt starts to date Holly Cleary. In the books, he is also described as being very sweet-natured and clean minded. Jim Parrack plays Hoyt in the HBO series True Blood, and the character's arc is much different from that in the book. Hoyt lives with his mother, who controls his life. In the TV series, Hoyt begins a romantic relationship with young vampire Jessica. Near the end of season five, Hoyt asks Jessica to wipe his memory, of ever having known her and Jason—which she reluctantly does—in order to un-do the emotional pain they have caused him. He then moves to Alaska to start a new life, but returns during the final season after the death of his mother. He eventually recovers his memories, and he and Jessica get married.

=== Hunter Savoy ===
A human child/telepath introduced in the eighth novel, From Dead to Worse, as a four-year-old. He is the son of Sookie's first cousin Hadley. In the tenth novel, Dead in the Family, Sookie begins to help him and his father cope with his telepathy. Sookie's fairy cousin Claude Crane knows Hunter is a telepath; but, for the child's safety, Sookie does not tell any of the vampire. Agent Lattesta also knows Hunter is a telepath. Max Charles plays Hunter Savoy on True Blood.

=== Jack and Lily Bard Leeds ===
First introduced in Dead as a Doornail, Jack and Lily Bard Leeds are human Private Investigators acting on the behalf of the Pelt Family in the search of their first adopted daughter. Jack Leeds is mentioned to being 'far too thorough' and noticing the inconsistencies in peoples behaviour, it is implied that he has a fair amount of tact. Lily Bard Leeds is talked about as being the stronger of the two and having no illusions as to innocence. Lily is also mentioned as having very little life in her face. Both are former main characters that featured in earlier works of Charlaine Harris. Mentioned in Definitely Dead as having given up the search for Debbie Pelt so's not to be fleecing the Pelts. In Dead Reckoning (novel), Mr. Cataliades sends the Leeds to Bon Temps to tell Sookie that Sandra Pelt is out of jail and wants Sookie dead. Along with Terry, Sam, and Jannalynn they take down four thugs hired by Sandra to kill Sookie at Merlotte's.

=== Janella ===
First introduced in Dead Until Dark as the companion to Liam the vampire who traveled with 2 other vampires, Malcolm and Diane.

=== Jason Stackhouse ===
Sookie's older brother. He is known as a ladies' man and is often associated with a lot of women of Bon Temps and other neighboring communities. He is selfish and often involves Sookie in his troubles. In the fourth novel, Dead to the World, he is kidnapped and bitten repeatedly by a werepanther and becomes a bitten werepanther. As a new member of the shifter community, he comes under suspicion of shooting other two-natured in anger at his transformation, but the suspicions are dropped after Sookie is shot. He marries Crystal Norris, a full-blooded werepanther, when she becomes pregnant, but he is sincere when he says his vows. Crystal later has an affair and they separate. Ryan Kwanten portrays Jason Stackhouse in HBO's television series True Blood.

=== JB Du Rone ===
First introduced in Dead Until Dark as a classmate of Sookie's. JB s described as beautiful and very muscular, but not very intelligent. He and Sookie went out a couple of times while teenagers, and he flirts with her frequently. Husband of Tara Thorton and father of her children, Sara Sookie du Rone and Robert Thorton du Rone.

=== Jerry ===
First introduced in Dead Until Dark as the beautiful boyfriend of Malcolm the vampire. Sookie read his mind and found that he had sino-aids so that Bill wouldn't drink from him.

=== Johan Glassport ===
A human lawyer for who works for Queen Sophie of Louisiana, first introduced in All Together Dead as a very unpleasant, unscrupulous human who spent time in prison in Mexico for knifing a woman.

=== Kenya Jones ===
First introduced in Dead Until Dark as a police woman who was five foot eleven, the color of bitter chocolate and built to weather hurricanes. In the books, she is romantically involved with her partner Kevin Pryor. She is portrayed by Tanya Wright in True Blood.

=== Kevin Prior ===
First introduced in Dead Until Dark as a police man and Kenya Jones' partner as well as love interest, who was about five foot eight with freckles all over his pale skin. Kevin is played by John Rezig in True Blood.

=== Lafayette ===
A cook at Merlotte’s. In Living Dead in Dallas, Sookie describes him as “flamboyantly gay, make-up-and-long-fingernails gay.” He is cheerful, entertainingly mischievous, clever, and known for his “burgers Lafayette.” Lafayette is murdered by members of a secret Bon-Temps sex club in the 2nd book, Living Dead in Dallas. His body is discovered by Sookie, in the back seat of Andy Bellefluer's car, as she arrives for work one morning. Nelsan Ellis plays Lafayette in the HBO series True Blood in which the story was altered to preserve the character for future episodes.

=== Layla Larue Lemay ===
Layla appears as a part of the performing dancing duo during the Vampire Summit in All Together Dead, but also enjoys a series of short stories of her own.

=== Maudette Pickens ===
First introduced in Dead Until Dark as a woman who was a fangbanger who was killed by strangulation. Sookie graduated in the same class as Maudette. She was portrayed by Danielle Sapia in True Blood.

=== Portia Bellefleur ===
Andy Bellefleur's sister. She is portrayed as “a plain woman just past thirty, whose best feature is her thick, shining chestnut hair.” Portia is a lawyer who is proud of her family's once wealthy and distinguished heritage, which has been much tarnished by financial reversals, so that she and her brother now live with their grandmother Caroline in a decaying antebellum mansion. Following the finding of Lafayette's dead body in her brother Andy's car in the novels, Portia begins casually dating Bill in order to find out any information that can clear her brother as Lafayette's killer. Because the murder is thought to be connected with some kind of sex parties, her thought is that dating a vampire will gain the attention of those holding the parties, so she will be invited and can find out more. Bill Compton later discovers that the Bellefleurs are his descendants and provides the family with an anonymous fortune from a “deceased relative”, knowing that they would be horrified if he were to tell them the truth of the connection. She is portrayed by Courtney Ford in the fourth season of True Blood.

=== Remy Savoy ===
The widower of Sookie's cousin Hadley, and father to Sookie's young, telepathic cousin, Hunter Savoy. He is both confused by and concerned about his son's abilities, and turns to Sookie for help once Hunter begins to say things that alarm people.

=== Rene Lenier ===
First introduced in Dead Until Dark as Arlene Fowler's second husband. He was swarthy and had a bushy headful of rough black hair threaded with gray. At the end of DUD Rene tried to kill Sookie but she stabbed him and ran into Bill's house to call 911. Rene killed his sister Cindy, Maudette Pickens, Dawn, Amy and Sookie's grandmother Adele. Unlike the show where he is killed by Sookie in self-defense, in the books he goes to jail and is not mentioned again. He is portrayed by Michael Raymond-James in True Blood.

=== Selah Pumphrey ===
Selah is a real estate saleswoman from Clarice. She is depicted as a slim brunette with shoulder-length hair. She is taller than Sookie and ten pounds lighter and has expensive, expertly done makeup. She is first introduced in the fifth novel, Dead as a Doornail, as Bill’s date. When Sookie reads her mind for the first time, Selah thinks she is slimmer, smarter, better educated, and has more money than Sookie, but she doubts her sexual skills because she believes lower-class women are better in bed. Sookie hates her immediately and thinks Selah is an elitist. Bill and Selah date until the eighth novel, From Dead to Worse when Selah moves to Little Rock because she has gotten a position from a larger firm, and Bill admits that he believes Selah was only interested in him because he's a vampire. Throughout Selah’s relationship with Bill, Bill has always told Sookie that he is still in love with her.

=== Steve and Sarah Newlin ===
Steven Newlin is the director and spiritual leader of The Fellowship of the Sun (FotS), an anti-vampire church. Sarah is his wife. They are first introduced in the novels in the second book, Living Dead in Dallas. Steve is described as being tall and lanky with hazy blue eyes and dark brown hair. The FotS and Steve are directly linked to Farrell's (Stan Davis's nest brother) disappearance. When Sookie goes to investigate, she is captured by the Newlins and held in the basement of the FotS church. The Newlins plan to hold a ceremony in which the vampire Farrell will be forced to “meet the sun”, which will cause him to burst into flame and die. They plan to tie Sookie to him so she will burn as well. Sookie escapes and foils their plans, but she meets Steve again in Club Dead, where he and a FotS fanatic try to stake a vampire in a Mississippi vampire bar. Sookie intervenes and Steve escapes. In the HBO TV show True Blood, Steve is played by Michael McMillian, and Sarah is played by Anna Camp.

=== Tara Thornton ===
She is first introduced in the second novel, Living Dead in Dallas, as Sookie's childhood friend. She participates in Bon Temps' secret sex party where Lafayette is killed, and dates a vampire for a short while before settling down to a tamer existence with a mutual high school friend of hers and Sookie's, JB du Rone. Later, the couple gives birth to a set of twins named Robbie and Sarah Sookie. Her character plays a minor part in the books, a stark contrast to her role in True Blood. Rutina Wesley portrays Tara Thornton in HBO's television series True Blood.

=== Warren ===
A friend of the werewolf Mustapha Khan, Warren is kidnapped in Deadlocked in order to be used as a hostage to ensure Mustapha's silence, or to make Mustapha turn himself in.

== Shapeshifters and Weres ==
=== Alcide Herveaux ===
Alcide is a full-blooded werewolf who owns a surveying company with his father. Sookie first meets Alcide when Bill Compton is kidnapped by his “maker” Lorena in Club Dead. Sookie goes on to aid Alcide in his attempts to uncover a plot to sabotage Alcide's father's bid to become leader of their pack, the Long Tooth Pack. They succeed in exposing the plot, but Alcide's dad is killed in one-on-one combat to determine leadership of the pack. Although Sookie and Alcide seem to have a mutual romantic interest, their relationship does not consolidate because of his complicated relationship with Debbie Pelt. In the eighth novel, From Dead to Worse, Alcide becomes the leader of his pack. In Dead Reckoning, he learns from Amelia that Sookie and Eric are no longer blood-bonded. Jannalynn suggests he go after her and Sookie comes home to find Alcide in her bed, due to the machinations of Amelia Broadway. Joe Manganiello portrays Alcide in HBO's True Blood series.

=== Calvin Norris ===
Calvin is a full-blooded werepanther and leader of the werepanther community in Hotshot, a close knit and secretive community ten miles from Bon Temps. He is first introduced in the fourth novel, Dead to the World, and he is portrayed as a man in his late forties, with trimmed beard salted with gray, short hair and green golden eyes. He is a small man, around five foot seven inches with an agile build and muscular arms. Because Hotshot takes care of its own justice, Calvin has a good deal of power over its residents, including the power to decide who is executed for their crimes. Calvin is Crystal’s uncle. When he first meets Sookie, she senses that Calvin and Crystal’s relationship is more than the authority of an uncle. The author explains that generations of inbreeding in the Hotshot community have weakened their shifting traits. Calvin explains to Sookie that though Crystal is a full-blooded panther, she can only change at the moon and is not even “full-powered.” In order to preserve the shifter traits, and to bring in new genes, Calvin offers Sookie protection and tells her he will be “her man”. He is a respected man who works as a crew leader in Norcross, a lumber processing company. Even though Sookie turns down his offers for a relationship, she still remains friends with him and enjoys his company. She often sees him after her brother and Crystal become involved, although they fall out a little when he starts dating a woman named Tanya, with whom Sookie has a negative past, eventually marrying her at a courthouse across the state line. At some point, following Hotshot community rules, Sookie must break some of his fingers with a cement block in order to punish Crystal for being unfaithful to her brother, Jason. Calvin is very upset when Crystal is killed, and ends up ordering the death of her killer when he is discovered. In True Blood, Gregory Sporleder plays Calvin Norris.

=== Colonel John Flood ===
Colonel Flood is a full-blooded werewolf and packmaster of Shreveport. He is a retired Air Force colonel, formerly stationed at Barksdale Air Force Base in Bossier City, Louisiana. He is first introduced in the fourth novel, Dead to the World and is depicted as having thick, white hair cut very short with a mustache that must have been trimmed with a ruler because it was so exact. Colonel Flood dies in a car accident in the fifth book, Dead as a Doornail. In True Blood, he is played by Grainger Hines.

=== Crystal Norris Stackhouse ===
Crystal is a full-blooded werepanther and niece of Calvin Norris. She is first introduced in the fourth novel, Dead to the World and is depicted as being a “short, thin, dark twenty-one-year-old.” Crystal appears in subsequent novels and eventually marries Jason because she is pregnant, though she miscarries the baby. Shifters tend to have low birthrate and Crystal has already had a miscarriage before, but she becomes pregnant again and it seems like she will be able to carry this pregnancy to term. While pregnant, she has an affair with another man and Jason finds out, manipulating Calvin Norris and Sookie into being witness to the infidelity. Their relationship deteriorates after that; Crystal moves back to Hotshot. She and her fetus are killed in the ninth book, Dead and Gone. Lindsay Pulsipher portrays Crystal in HBO's True Blood; however, at the start of season 3, she has a fiancé who is not Jason.

=== Debbie Pelt ===
She is first introduced in the third novel, Club Dead, and Sookie describes her hair as being “straight and cut in asymmetrical clumps, tiny locks of different lengths.” She is mean-spirited and vindictive, and her relationship with Alcide has been tumultuous. When she left him, she quickly got engaged to a Were-owl. However, she became jealous when she saw Alcide with Sookie. In this novel, she pushes Sookie into a car trunk where Bill is being concealed after Sookie rescues him from being starved and tortured by Lorena. It is revealed in the fourth book, Dead to the World, that Debbie had participated in Bill’s torture. Alcide then abjures her from the Shreveport pack. At the end of this book, Debbie shoots at Sookie, but Eric takes the bullet instead. Sookie then kills her and Eric disposes of the body. In subsequent novels, Debbie’s family looks for her and causes Sookie some problems because they believe Sookie has something to do with her disappearance. Brit Morgan portrays Debbie in HBO's True Blood. When first introduced in the third installment of the Sookie Stackhouse novels, Debbie Pelt identifies herself as a Were-lynx from Jackson, MS. However, as the storyline progresses (due to lack of continuity), she is said to be a Were-fox adopted by a Werewolf couple who could not conceive. She is described as a “tall young woman with gleaming short black hair, athletic build, and a long narrow face.”

=== Luna Garza ===
Luna is the second shapeshifter, after Sam, that Sookie meets in Living Dead in Dallas. It is implied that she shapeshifts into a bat. Luna is a Hispanic woman with dark eyes and hair. While working undercover at The Fellowship of the Sun (FotS), she helps Sookie escape from the murderous members of the church. Through Luna, Sookie learns that there are many other ‘supes’ (supernatural beings) in this world. Janina Gavankar portrays Luna in HBO's True Blood.

=== Maria-Star Cooper ===
Maria-Star is a full-blooded werewolf and packmember of the Shreveport pack. She is first introduced in the fourth book, Dead to the World, when Maria-Star, in wolf form, gets injured in an attack by the witch coven. Sookie takes Maria-Star to the hospital. Maria-Star has “beautiful light-toast skin and curly dark hair.” This character appears in subsequent novels, and becomes Alcide’s girlfriend, though she is brutally murdered in the eighth book, From Dead to Worse.

=== Mel Hart ===
Mel Hart is a full-blooded were-panther who becomes good friends with Jason Stackhouse, following Jason's falling out with his other friend, Hoyt. Mel seems overly devoted to Jason, always seen hanging out with him, drinking, eating, and even going on double dates with Jason and Crystal (his wife). Mel, a full-blood panther, was once a member of the Hotshot Community, but left it to live in town. He let it be known it was his choice to leave, but it turns out that he was exiled from the community because he was gay and did not want to produce a child with a woman, as the community demanded of him. Sookie later finds out that Mel was involved in the murder of Jason's estranged and adulterous wife, Crystal. When Mel stopped by Jason's to get some wood, Crystal made some cruel remarks about his homosexuality and his love for Jason. Mel, already jealous of and angry at Crystal, slashes her with a half-transformed clawed hand. He then quickly leaves the scene with Crystal unconscious but alive. However, after Mel leaves Crystal in that vulnerable position she is kidnapped by two faeries and crucified. It is unclear whether or not she could have survived Mel's attack. However, because he left her there, Mel is punished by being torn apart by the Hotshot pack-members.

=== Mustapha Khan ===
Mustapha Khan is the adopted name of KeShawn Johnson, a werewolf. He changed his name after getting out of prison for a crime that is not known to others in the novels. Eric Northman hires him as a new daytime guy (Dead Reckoning)—it's an unusual decision for a vampire to hire a werewolf, as the two magical groups do not typically get along. Mustapha is a lone wolf in the Shreveport area, declining to even try to join the Long Tooth pack headed by Alcide. His stated reason is that Alcide's enforcer, Jannalynn, doesn't like him, and Mustapha is not sure he could win in a fight against her. Some other werewolves are prejudiced against his African-American origins. Eventually, he does join the Long Tooth Pack. He has a human friend, Warren.

=== Quinn ===
John Quinn is a full-blooded weretiger who first appears in the fifth book Dead as a Doornail. Quinn is portrayed as being at least six and a half feet tall, impressively muscular, bald, and having purple eyes (often compared to the color of pansies). As a supernatural coordinator for the Extremely Elegant) Events company, his job is to arrange and emcee all types of supernatural community events, such as a pack master contest or a wedding. He becomes Sookie's romantic interest for a while. He does not reveal anything about his life to Sookie, and she only learns about his history through other people—when he was 15, he kills a group of humans who had been raping his mother, then seeks assistance from local vampires to clean up the mess. In exchange, the vampires demand his servitude for three years as a weretiger in gladiatorial events. Quinn has a mentally ill mother in addition to a teenaged sister, and both require his attention and protection. Sookie breaks up with him in the eighth book. In the ninth book, Dead and Gone, Quinn returns to see Sookie at her home in Bon Temps, but ends up in a fight with Bill over Sookie's protection. While Bill walks away with minor injuries, Quinn suffers several broken ribs and a broken jaw and has to flee. But Quinn continues to seek new encounters with Sookie. And eventually finds one.

Quinn also appears as a character in the novel Day Shift, part of the Midnight, Texas trilogy.

=== Tanya Grissom Norris ===
Were-fox and blood relative to Debbie Pelt. Is undercover to gain Sookie's trust and find out the whereabouts of Debbie Pelt. Remains in Bon Temps after the Pelts get their answers. Is an initial love interest for Sam Merlotte and later for Calvin Norris. She is under a spell which is cast by Amelia and her mentor, which after being cast upon her, she no longer remembers the initial reason why she came to Bon Temps and her personality seems altered In "Dead in The Family" she marries Calvin Norris.

=== Tray Dawson ===
Tray is a full-blooded werewolf. He is first introduced in Dead as a Doornail and is portrayed as being a “slab of muscle… a barrel-shaped man.” Sookie thinks he looks “dangerous.” In this novel, he is hired to be Calvin Norris’ bodyguard and is injured when Sweetie Des Arts shoots him while he is protecting Sookie. He lives apart from the Shreveport Pack, and is the owner of a motorcycle shop. Because of his strength, Tray is often used as a bodyguard. Tray starts dating Sookie's roommate, Amelia Broadway, in the eighth novel, From Dead to Worse. In Dead and Gone, Sookie hires him for protection, but while guarding Sookie, Tray drinks poisoned vampire blood and ends up being captured and severely tortured. While in the hospital, on the verge of death, he grabs hold of the fairy Breandan with the last of his strength, successfully causing a diversion. Breandan kills Tray, but Dawson's final act had given Bill time to deliver the killing blow to the fairy.

=== Jannalynn Hopper ===
Jannalynn is described as a flashy dresser with a violent streak. She belongs to Alcide Herveaux's wolf pack and she starts to date Sam Merlotte in Dead in the Family. She becomes Alcide's second in command after Annabelle, another new arrival to the series, betrays his trust and was banished from the pack. She later on betrays Alcide herself in order to become the new packleader, however Sookie and Alcide are able to stop her. She's then beheaded by Mustapha Khan for kidnapping his lover Warren but not before she accidentally kills her boyfriend, Sam while trying to stab Alcide.

=== The Pelt Family ===
The Pelt Family makes its first appearance in Definitely Dead but are first mentioned in Club Dead.

The family consists of Gordon and Barbara, with Debbie and Sandra Pelt as their adoptive children. Gordon and Barbara are both full-blooded Weres who unable to have children adopted the children of other shifters. Sandra Pelt is also a full-blooded Were and is doted on by her parents. Barbara is also a spell-caster, it is also implied, but unproven, that Sandra and Debbie are both spell-casters. They are considered 'savage' as a family by Maria-Star Cooper. Gordon is, however, a man of honour, willing to give his word and back it up with his life. Both Gordon and Barbara are killed in a suspicious car accident later in the series.

Sandra Pelt is the main driving force behind the search for Debbie, using any means at her disposal, no matter the cost in lives. In is implied that she is ruthless, manipulative, possessing very little common sense and without a shred of decency; she is one of the enemies that Sookie has intimated that we have yet to hear the last from In Dead Reckoning, we learn that she was in jail for assault and battery on a cousin relating to the Pelts' will, which is in the hands of Mr. Cataliades until Sandra turns 21. She gets out of jail and hires thugs to kill Sookie, but when they fail, she holds Sam and Jannalynn at gunpoint, forcing them to take her to Sookie's house. Sookie, suspicious of Sam's call, is ready when they arrive with her shotgun. Sandra is wounded, allowing Jannalynn to attack her- knocking her unconscious and breaking her neck and skull. Under Sookie's suggestion, they toss Sandra's dead body into the fairy portal where it is torn apart by some unseen creatures.Barbara Pelt is the initial controller of Tanya Grissom directing her to make friends with Sookie during Definitely Dead. Later, after Gordon and Barbara's Death, Sandra seems to take over the directing of Tanya. It is not known if Sandra is aware of Tanya's exorcizing.

== Fairies ==
=== Claude Crane ===
Claude is one of Niall Brigant's (the faerie prince) grandsons and Claudine's twin brother (they used to have a triplet named Claudette). He is the nephew of Sookie's half-human/half-fairy grandfather, Fintan, and cousin to Sookie's father. His first appearance in a novel is in the fifth novel, Dead as a Doornail, but the character first appears in Harris's short story, Fairy Dust. He makes an impact on all women and is described as being absolutely breathtaking, so lovely that his proximity makes Sookie tense as a “high wire.” He started out as a stripper at Hooligans, a club in Monroe, which he later becomes owner of, and has branched out to print and runway modeling. He is depicted as being six feet tall with rippling black hair, muscles, and a six-pack. He has a pair of brown, velour-soft eyes, a chiseled jaw, and a sensuous mouth with a pouty bottom lip. Women usually say “wow” when they see him, but his interest is men. His ears have been surgically altered from pointed to rounded to look like human ears. Though his physical appearance is magnificent, he is not polite and has a tiny sense of humor. He seems to like and treat Sookie better once it is revealed to her that she is related to him. In Dead in the Family, he moves in with Sookie out of loneliness after his sister, Claudine, is killed. In Dead Reckoning (novel), it is suggested by Dermot that Claude has ulterior motives, especially when Sookie finds the cluviel dor that was given to Adele by Fintan, via Mr. Cataliades. He is a Sky fairy. In Deadlocked, it is revealed that Claude has been searching for the Cluviel Dor and he was also the one who put the insanity curse on Dermott. In True Blood, Claude is played by Giles Matthey and is immediately delighted to meet Sookie and Jason. He is the manager of a supernatural nightclub staffed by fairies who have fled Queen Mab's regime.

=== Claudine Crane ===
Claudine is Sookie’s “fairy godmother” and twin sister of Claude (they had a triplet named Claudette, but she is mentioned to be dead in Harris's short story Fairy Dust.) She is also Niall Brigant's granddaughter, the niece of Sookie's half-human/half-fae grandfather, Fintan, and cousin to Sookie's father. She is first introduced in the fourth novel, Dead to the World. She is depicted as a gorgeous woman, at least six feet, with dark hair and big almond shaped dark eyes. Her skin is as pale as milk, and her legs were “as long as a stepladder” She has a beautiful smile and her skin looks glossy and thin. Sookie says Claudine's skin reminds her of the skin of a plum. In the fourth book, Sookie learns that Claudine is a fairy and that she is in Shreveport due to the various supernatural activities. Later in the books, Sookie learns that Claudine is actually Sookie’s fairy godmother who is working her way up to be an angel. Claudine has saved Sookie from danger on multiple occasions. She goes by Claudine Crane among humans. Claudine is killed in the climactic battle at the end of Dead and Gone, after announcing to Sookie that she (Claudine) is pregnant with a full-blooded fairy child. She is a Sky fairy. In the television series, she is shown briefly in a deleted scene (later included in a relevant season four episode) where she causes the chain Sookie throws at the Rattrays to wrap around his neck. Bill, who smells her, causes her to flee. Lara Pulver portrays Claudine in HBO's True Blood series. Here, she is the eldest of 17 sisters and a reluctant agent of the insidious Queen Mab. This version of Claudine is drained and killed by Eric when in his amnesia state.

=== Claudette Crane ===
Claudette is the late triplet sibling of Claude and Claudine who was murdered in the short story Fairy Dust. She is a Sky fairy. In the fifth season of True Blood, Claudette is portrayed by Camilla Luddington and is one of 17 Crane sisters.

=== Niall Brigant ===
Niall Brigant is Sookie's faerie prince great-grandfather. He is first introduced in the novels in the eighth book, From Dead to Worse. He is tall and slim, extremely handsome with long, pale gold hair. Sookie describes Niall as being a lovely creature and having some age to him. His half-fairy son, Fintan, was Sookie's paternal grandfather and not Mitchell Stackhouse as Sookie grew up believing. Niall's enemies attempt to kill Sookie and were almost successful. At the end of the ninth book, Dead and Gone, Niall decides to live in the fairy world and cut off the ties between the two worlds to prevent future conflict. He is a sky fairy. In the sixth season of True Blood, Niall is played by Rutger Hauer.

=== Breandan ===
Breandan is the son of Niall Brigant's older brother, Rogan, and appears in the novel Dead and Gone. Rogan claimed kinship to the sea, and from there his influence spread to all bodies of water; Breandan, like Niall, is a prince, but he is prince of the Water Fae. His goal is to kill every human with fairy blood because he believes they are the reason for the infertility in the fae world and for the fae magic weakening. Rogan was the only one capable of restraining Breandan and when Rogan died, Breandan and his forces began killing all part-fey. Breandan killed Sookie's biological grandfather, Fintan. He is killed by Bill when the fairy war breaks into the human world.

=== Dermot Brigant ===
Dermot is Sookie's great uncle, Niall's son, and Fintan's fraternal twin brother. He appears in the novels Dead and Gone, Dead in the Family and Dead Reckoning. He is said to look like he could be Jason's twin, and it is hard to tell them apart. He ends up saving Sookie from being killed by Colman at the end of Dead in the Family. In the book following Dead In The Family, it is mentioned by Sam Merlotte that Dermot may be beginning to develop a physical attraction towards Sookie. Throughout 'Dead Reckoning' they are drawn closer as a result of Claude. Whether he is attracted to Sookie isn't told to us by the end of the book, but it isn't unusual for fairies to ignore blood relations and break into relationships. He is a sky fairy and is also known to be very gracious towards his family. However he is not so fond of his brother's close friend, Mr. Cataliades.

=== Colman ===
A fairy, he is introduced in Dead in the Family and is Claudine's lover and the father of the child she was carrying at her death. He blamed Sookie for the death of Claudine and tracked her down. At the end of the book, he is killed by Eric after killing Ocella, Eric's maker.

=== Neave and Lochlan ===
Very powerful water fairies in the novel Dead and Gone. They have a very dark reputation in the supernatural world and are known to be violent and sadistic to a point that makes even some vampires squeamish. They torture Sookie (and also Tray Dawson). They are killed by Bill and Niall respectively. It is also revealed that they were responsible for the deaths of Sookie's parents and the crucifixion of Jason's pregnant wife, Crystal.

=== Preston Pardloe ===
A fairy that can shapeshift and change his form. He appears in the Sookie Stackhouse short story Gift Wrap He was found in Sookie's woods beaten and bloody, without a stitch of clothing, on Christmas Eve. This story takes place in Dead and Gone when Eric can't visit Sookie at the beginning of the book. He has tawny eyes and dark chocolate colored hair that goes to his shoulders. He only spends one night with her and thought by Sookie to just be a werewolf. He was sent by Niall, to keep Sookie company during Christmas Eve. He is a sky fairy.

=== Caitlin ===
A female fairy who was kidnapped by Victor's people as they need fairy blood to poison Eric and Pam. She was hanging around with Claude and Dermot at their strip club and had family staying there.

=== Murry ===
Murry was a male fairy who was part of Breandans water fairies rebellion army. He attacked Sookie at her home. He came up behind her and surprised her, however he was too cocky and said “I'm going to enjoy killing you for my master” which gave Sookie time to react and drive an iron trowel through he stomach which killed him. In retaliation Breandan kidnapped and killed the fairy Enda. He is a water fairy.

=== Enda ===
A female fairy who was tortured and killed by Breandan and his water fairies. She was kidnapped and killed because Sookie killed one of Breandan's fairies in self-defense. As she was a female fairy her death was a serious statement to Niall.

=== Lee ===
A male fairy who along with 2 brownies attempted to kill Claudine by ambushing her. However Claudine was too strong for all three of them and she killed them all including Lee. He is a water fairy.

=== Branna ===
A female fairy who was Niall's wife. Together they had a son Dillon. However Niall and Branna never got along and so as Niall was fond of humans he had an affair with “Einin” a human woman.

=== Dillon ===
Niall's full-blooded fairy son. He and the fairy Binne had triplets “Claudine, Claude and Claudette”. He is next in line to be the fairy prince if Niall dies. He has a scary demeanor and appearance. He came with Niall to see what happened when Sookie (his great granddaughter) told them about Murrays attack. Claudine appeared to him when she died before going to the Summerland. He is a sky fairy whose name means lightning.

=== Binne ===
A female fairy who is Dillons wife. She is the mother of “Claudine, Claude and Claudette”.

=== Rogan ===
A male fairy who is Niall's older brother and Breandan's father. He was the only one who could control Breandan and when he died Breandan's attacks against the Sky fae became more audacious.

=== Breandans wife and child ===
After Niall had won the war he told Sookie he spared the life of Breandan's wife who gave birth to Breandan's son. He told her he did it as she had surrendered and the female fairies numbers are in decline. Sookie felt Niall wanted praise for doing this. However Breandans son refused to surrender and so Niall was forced to kill him. They were both water fairies.

=== Unnamed water fairy ===
A female fairy who was part of Breandans army but was spared after the fairy war as female fairies are needed to rebuild the fairy population. She is a water fairy.

== Witches and Wiccans ==
=== Amelia Broadway ===
Amelia Broadway is an up-and-coming witch that appears in Definitely Dead. She was the landlady of Sookie's cousin Hadley in New Orleans. She accidentally turns a fellow witch named Bob into a cat (that Sookie and Amelia keep as a pet). She promptly leaves the city of New Orleans with Sookie to stay until things blow over. Her father is a very wealthy and well known building contractor in the lumber business. She is also bisexual and had a brief relationship with Pam before she begins a relationship with Tray Dawson. Amelia leaves Bon Temps and returns to New Orleans after Tray dies in the Fae War, but remains in contact with Sookie by the occasional email. Amelia returns in Dead Reckoning (novel) to help Sookie break the blood bond between her and Eric. She leaves soon after due to angering Sookie by meddling in her personal life.

=== Holly Cleary ===
Human. Wiccan. Barmaid with Sookie at Merlotte’s. She is introduced in the second novel, Living Dead in Dallas, and is a minor character throughout the books though her character is further developed in the fourth book, Dead to the World. Holly had married right out of high school and gotten divorced within five years. As a Wiccan, not a witch, Holly practices a little witchcraft and has some magical abilities but she's primarily interested in the Wiccan life. She has a son, Cody, who is five years old when Holly is introduced. None of the humans in Bon Temps know she follows the Wiccan religion. Later in the books, Holly starts dating Hoyt Fortenberry. Lauren Bowles portrays Holly on HBO's adaptation of the books, True Blood.

=== Hallow Stonebrook ===
Also known as Marnie Stonebrook. She was a witch and werewolf (who also drinks vampire blood), and was portrayed as being tall, slim and broad-shouldered with short brown thick hair. She led the coven trying to grab a large chunk of the Shreveport vampires' businesses and money. When Sookie tried to “listen” in, Hallow sensed that someone was reading her mind. After she un-hexed Eric, she was eventually killed by Pam. She is portrayed by actress Fiona Shaw in the fourth season of True Blood.

=== Octavia Fant ===
Octavia is a witch and Amelia's mentor and teacher. She is the primary person that Amelia is hiding from after she moves in with Sookie. After Octavia tracks Amelia down, she stays with Sookie and Amelia for a time before returning to New Orleans with her boyfriend, Louis, whom she'd lost touch with during Hurricane Katrina.

== Others ==
=== Callisto ===
Maenad. At the beginning of Living Dead in Dallas, Sookie meets Callisto, who is accompanied by a feral razorback pig, in the woods. Callisto wants tribute from Eric and, in order to convey this message, Callisto claws Sookie, which poisons her blood. The maenad appears for the last time at the secret sex party at the end of the book. The drunkenness and the lust of the party participants attract her. She kills Mike Spencer and the Hardaways (who are revealed to have killed Lafayette), and most of the other party-goers, leaving a mess behind, which Bill and Eric clean up. It is implied that Sam and Callisto had a relationship, but she leaves Bon Temps to look for more tribute. Michelle Forbes portrayed her in the second season of the True Blood television series, where Callisto's name is changed to Maryann.

=== Desmond Cataliades ===
Semi-demon. Uncle to Diantha and her late sister, Gladiola. Lawyer for the Queen of Louisiana, Sophie-Anne Leclerq, in which capacity he handled the estate of Sookie's cousin Hadley, who was Sophie-Anne's former lover. In Dead Reckoning, it is implied that he handles supernatural cases since he is also handling Sandra Pelt's inheritance until she turns 21. His brother, Nargal, is a full demon. It is revealed in Dead Reckoning (novel) that he is Sookie's “sponsor”, and responsible for the telepathic ability in the Stackhouse line: as a baby gift to his close friend Fintan, Sookie's fairy biological grandfather, he gave a thimbleful of his blood to both Adele and Fintan. This allowed descendants of the couple with an “essential spark” (an openness to the other world) to have telepathy, just like he does. His great-great-great grandson is Barry Horowitz, though Barry does not know it.

=== Diantha ===
Semi-demon. Niece of Mr. Cataliades and sister to the late Gladiola. She works for Queen Sophie-Anne Leclerq as a messenger. She is about five feet tall, has naturally pointed teeth and known for wearing strange ensembles. Like her late sister, she is capable of running at extremely high-speeds, often running to deliver messages in between cities, rather than driving. She also talks very quickly, as if she does not breathe when talking.

=== Gladiola ===
Semi-Demon. Niece of Mr. Cataliades and sister to Diantha. She also worked for Sophie-Anne Leclerq as a messenger. She is murdered in the novel Definitely Dead, by the King of Arkansas' minion, Jade Flower, and left on Sookie's land. She is found later by her sister, Uncle, and Sookie and burned in Sookie's driveway. It is said that Gladiola and Diantha were powerful together, even taking down groups of vampires.

=== Dr. Ludwig ===
Dr. Amy Ludwig is a doctor to supernatural beings. She is around three feet tall with a deep voice. She has a large nose and olive skin. Her hair is coarse golden brown and very thick and wavy. She heals Sookie in Living Dead in Dallas after she is poisoned by the claws of a maenad. Dr. Ludwig later comes to help Crystal at the request of Sookie. Dr. Ludwig's answering machine states that she is not accepting new patients. In Dead and Gone, Sookie muses as to whether or not Dr. Ludwig might be a Hobbit, but she is unable to check to see if she is wearing shoes. Marcia de Rousse portrays Dr. Ludwig in True Blood.

=== Jake Purifoy ===
A werewolf employed by Quinn, he is turned into a vampire by Sookie's cousin, Hadley, in Definitely Dead, in an effort to save him after another vampire drains him. Blinded by bloodlust, he attacks Sookie and Amelia when he first rises. Jake resents having been turned into a vampire as he is no longer able to turn into a wolf and no longer trusted by the werewolves of his pack and because of the hatred between vampires and weres, no were would ever agree to be turned. Furthermore, due to his youth and were heritage, he has to work hard to earn the respect and trust of the vampires.During All Together Dead he is one of the traitors who collaborates with members of The Fellowship of the Sun in Rhodes. It is probable that he feels guilty about causing some of the attendants' deaths because, like him, they have no choice but to work for vampires. He attempts to warn Sookie before the explosion, but is knocked out by the rising of the sun. He dies in the explosion.

=== Quiana Wong ===
A resident of Bon Temps, who first appears in the short story: If I Had A Hammer. She's an 18-year-old girl who is a psychic; currently, she is working for Tara as her babysitter, since Tara has given birth to her twins Robbie and Sara. Sookie is a little awkward around her at first but as the story progresses, Sookie seems to admire and respect the girl more and more. Quiana sees visions via touch, has lost both her parents tragically, and as Sookie notices, Quiana saw the future for Tara’s twins yet kept it to herself when asked about it.

=== Batanya and Clovache ===
Britlingens. These two females are partners who help protect King Isaiah of Kentucky in the novel All Together Dead. They are very muscular, and wear fighting armor at all times. They also have a variety of weapons. They live in a different dimension, and are brought to this one by witches in order to protect those that have hired them. Their fees cost a fortune and they are returned to their own dimension at the end of each contract. In the book All Together Dead, Batanya is the leader of the two, and Clovache is her subordinate. In the novella The Britlingens Go To Hell readers can meet them again and find more about the way things are done in the Britlingen Collective.
