= Club Dead =

2003 mystery novel by Charlaine Harris

- Cover of Club Dead
- Author: Charlaine Harris
- Cover artist: Erika Fusari
- Language: English
- Series: The Southern Vampire Mysteries
- Genre: Fantasy, Mystery, Gothic, Romance
- Publisher: Ace Books
- Publication date: May 2003
- Publication place: United States
- Media type: Print (Hardcover, Paperback) e-Book (Kindle); Audio Book (CD)
- Pages: 291 (Paperback); 392(Hardcover)
- ISBN: 0-441-01051-2
- OCLC: 52093965
- LC Class: CPB Box no. 2084 vol. 2
- Preceded by: Living Dead in Dallas
- Followed by: Dead to the World

Club Dead is the third book in American mystery writer Charlaine Harris's series The Southern Vampire Mysteries, released in 2003. In Club Dead, Sookie's boyfriend Bill disappears while working on a secret project, and Sookie heads out to Jackson, Mississippi in hopes of retrieving him alive. In this quest, she enlists the aid of a werewolf, Alcide Herveaux, and a vampire Eric.

The novel was adapted as the third season of True Blood, the HBO series based on the novels, however with a few notable differences. The season was broadcast from June 13 to September 12, 2010.

== Plot summary ==
The novel takes place in December. Sookie discovers Bill working secretively on his computer. Bill closes a file but not before Sookie sees the screen. Bill informs Sookie he has to leave to complete a task ordered by the Queen of Louisiana Vampires. Days later, a werewolf targeting Sookie comes into her workplace, Merlotte's, but he is eliminated by Bubba, sent on Eric's orders, before he can harm Sookie. As night falls, Eric and his employees tell Sookie that Bill had actually been in Mississippi, where his former lover and maker Lorena had summoned him. They continue to tell Sookie that Bill has since then gone missing, and Eric speaks of his suspicions on Lorena's involvement. He also states that the vampire queen of Louisiana will need to receive Bill's secret project on its due date, if Eric wishes not to compromise his life. Since Eric is unable to interrogate humans or vampires in the territory of Mississippi vampire king Russell Edgington without provoking a war, he invites Sookie to come along to Mississippi and utilize her telepathy to locate Bill. Sookie agrees, but is shocked at Bill's possible betrayal of her.

The next day, Sookie is introduced to Alcide Herveaux, a werewolf sent by Eric to help Sookie circulate in the supernatural community of Jackson, Mississippi. Sookie takes a liking to Alcide's physique and personality. In Jackson, Alcide escorts her to a local vampire bar, Josephine's, generally known as Club Dead. In this club, Sookie learns by telepathy that Bill is being held captive and that Russell Edgington is possibly involved. She meets Edgington when he aids her after a confrontation with a were patron angered at Sookie rebuffing his sexual advances. Edgington insists they come in the next night as well. In the same night, Sookie is confronted by Alcide's jealous ex-girlfriend Debbie Pelt, a shapeshifter who, despite being at her own engagement party, is furious with Sookie presenting herself as Alcide's escort.

The next day, Sookie and Alcide discover in their closet the dead body of the Club Dead patron who had been making unwanted advances at Sookie. After disposing of the body, that is later revealed to have been an assailant aiming for Sookie killed by Bubba, the duo head out for another night in Club Dead, where Sookie meets her friend Tara Thornton as another vampire's escort. However, she discovers the Fellowship of the Sun, an anti-vampire organization prominently featured in Living Dead in Dallas, has come in Club Dead intent on killing vampires. While preventing the Fellowship from staking one of Russell Edgington's employees, she herself is staked, then rescued by Eric and taken to the King of Mississippi's compound and receives medical attention at Edgington's mansion. Sookie shares an intimate moment with Eric, but Bubba informs them Bill is being tortured in one of Edgington's poolhouses.

At dawn, Sookie heads out to the poolhouse. She frees Bill and manages to stake Lorena as she attacks, but is locked into the trunk of her own car alongside the sleeping Bill when she returns to Alcide's apartment building. When Bill, deprived of blood and sleep for a week, wakes up, he attacks and feeds on Sookie and rapes her in the trunk. Sookie asks Eric to drive her home, fed up with the whole ordeal. While on their way home, two robbers raid a gas station alongside their route looking for Sookie and Eric and in Sookie's home, several werewolves wait for her and attack her. Eric and Bill eliminate all werewolves, but Sookie angrily breaks up with Bill and rescinds both Bill and Eric's invitation to her house. The novel ends with Sookie realizing Bill's special project is inside her house, and no vampire will be physically able to retrieve it.

== Television adaptation ==
The Southern Vampire Mysteries have been adapted by HBO into a television series called True Blood. The storyline of Club Dead forms the basis of True Blood's third season. Its first episode aired on June 13, 2010. Although the main characters and story lines are the same, there are significant differences between the book and the series, most notably:

- In the series, themes and characters from novels following Club Dead are already introduced, such as Sookie's fairy background.
- In the book, Tara Thornton is merely an escort to a vampire friend, Franklin Mott. In the series, she is abducted and raped by him, and he is a spy to Russell Edgington investigating Bill's project.
- Debbie Pelt is introduced as a werewolf in the series, rather than a shapeshifter.
- In the series, Russell Edgington has Bill abducted by werewolves and tries to have him shift his loyalty - he treats him as a guest and orders for his execution, resulting in Lorena torturing him, later on.
- Russell Edgington has a main vampire consort in the series. In the novel, vampire relationships are described as unusual and Russell is accompanied by a human consort.
- In the series, Lou Pine's is a werewolf/shifter exclusive bar, rather than a vampire bar that accommodated all of the supernatural community.

== See also ==
- True Blood season 3
- Characters of The Southern Vampire Mysteries
- Characters of True Blood
- True Blood
