= Dead and Gone (novel) =

Novel by Charlaine Harris

- Cover of Dead and Gone
- Author: Charlaine Harris
- Language: English
- Series: The Southern Vampire Mysteries
- Genre: Fantasy, Mystery, Gothic, Romance
- Publisher: Ace Books
- Publication date: May 5, 2009
- Publication place: United States
- Media type: Print (Hardcover, Paperback)(N/A) e-Book (Kindle); Audio Book (CD)
- Pages: 320 (Hardcover)
- ISBN: 978-0-441-01715-7
- OCLC: 268794857
- Preceded by: From Dead to Worse
- Followed by: Dead in the Family

Dead and Gone is the ninth book in Charlaine Harris's series The Southern Vampire Mysteries. This title was released on May 5, 2009, and reached #1 in the New York Times hardcover best-seller list.

== Plot summary ==
In this novel, the weres and shifters make their presence known, following the example of the vampires. At the same time, the King of Nevada, who now leads Louisiana as well, begins consolidating his power, which has a number of repercussions. The revelation of the existence of weres and shifters causes some problems. Sookie's boss, Sam Merlotte, reveals to the community that he is a shifter, and Tray Dawson reveals he is a Were, with both men changing into their animal forms at Merlotte's Bar on the evening of the announcement. Most residents of Bon Temps take the new revelation fairly well; Merlotte's initially sees some business slowdown, but then it returns to normal. However, Merlotte's waitress Arlene, who has been dating a member of the anti-vampire Fellowship of the Sun (FoS), takes the revelation badly and quits her job in a fury. Sam's mother, who is also a shifter, is shot by Sam's step-father, and Sam's non-shifter siblings, who did not know their parents and brother were shifters, have some troubles related to the announcement. Sam leaves Bon Temps to help his mother and leaves Sookie in temporary charge of the bar.

Meanwhile, the King of Nevada, Felipe de Castro, consolidates his power in Louisiana. Eric, as the only Louisiana Sheriff to survive the defeat of Queen Sophie-Anne's reign, is in a tenuous position and struggles with Victor Madden, the king's representative. Eric fears the king will try to acquire Sookie to use in his Nevada business dealings, so Eric tricks Sookie, who is unfamiliar with vampire marriage protocols, into marrying him. She is not happy about it, but there is little she can do. However, the marriage is only recognized by vampires.

The FBI comes to speak with her about her role in finding people during the collapse of the Pyramid of Gizeh. Then, the mutilated and crucified body of Jason's pregnant werepanther wife is found in the parking lot of Merlotte's, leading Sookie to think it is a hate crime against the recently revealed Weres. When Arlene invites Sookie to her home, Sookie arrives only to discover, through observation and her mind-reading abilities, that Arlene's Fellowship of the Sun friends intend to crucify Sookie, with Arlene leading Sookie into the trap. Sookie calls the authorities and confronts Arlene. In the shoot-out that follows, one of the FoS men is killed and an FBI agent is wounded, and Arlene is arrested along with the surviving would-be murderer. However, Sookie realizes that despite their attempt to use her as an example, they did not crucify Crystal Stackhouse. They intended to commit a copycat crime.

Sookie learns that her fairy great-grandfather, Niall, is engaged in a deadly fairy war, with Sookie stuck in the middle. Two psychotic fairies, Lochlan and Neave, are killing all humans with partial Fairy blood because they believe mixing with humans is the reason for the declining prominence of full-bloodied fae. Those same fairies killed Sookie's parents, since her father was a quarter fae. It is later revealed that the bloodthirsty duo crucified Jason Stackhouse's wife just for fun. Later, they kidnap Sookie and torture her in order to get her great-grandfather to surrender. Sookie is rescued by Bill and Niall, but not before being greatly traumatized and possibly mortally wounded. Eric gives her more of his blood, but can't spare enough for her to heal completely since she has very serious injuries and Eric himself needs his strength in the forthcoming battle. In a final battle at the supernatural hospital Sookie's fairy godmother, Claudine (who is pregnant), is killed, as is Tray Dawson, Sookie's were bodyguard and boyfriend of Sookie's witch roommate Amelia Broadway. Sookie is saved by Eric and Bill, who kill Breandan. Niall then decides to seal off Faery, and bids Sookie farewell.

== Characters in Dead and Gone ==
=== Main characters ===
- Sookie Stackhouse
- Eric Northman
- Bill Compton
- Sam Merlotte

=== Recurring characters ===
- Amelia Broadway
- Andy Bellefleur
- Bud Dearborn
- Calvin Norris
- Clancy (vampire)
- Claude Crane
- Claudine
- Dr. Ludwig
- Jason Stackhouse
- Mel Hart
- Niall Brigant
- Octavia Fant
- Pam (vampire)
- Tray Dawson
- Tara Thornton

== Non-recurring characters ==
- Breandan
- Lochlan and Neave
- Murray
- Mel Hart
- Agent Sara Weiss
- Agent Tom Latteste
