= Dead to the World (novel) =

2004 novel by Charlaine Harris

- Cover of Dead to the world
- Author: Charlaine Harris
- Language: English
- Series: The Southern Vampire Mysteries
- Genre: Fantasy, Mystery, Gothic, Romance
- Publisher: Ace Books
- Publication date: May 4, 2004
- Publication place: United States
- Media type: Print (Hardcover, Paperback) e-Book (Kindle); Audio Book (CD)
- Pages: 320 (paperback)
- ISBN: 978-0-441-01218-3
- OCLC: 60192550
- Preceded by: Club Dead
- Followed by: Dead as a Doornail

Dead to the World is the fourth book in Charlaine Harris's series The Southern Vampire Mysteries, released in 2004. In Dead to the World, Sookie aids vampires Eric and Pam in their struggle against a coven of witches seeking to take over control of their area, and takes care of Eric after the witches erase his memory.

The novel was adapted as the fourth season of True Blood, the HBO series based on the novels, however with a few notable differences.

== Plot summary ==
This novel opens on New Year's Eve, three weeks after the events of Club Dead. Sookie Stackhouse finds Eric running down the road close to her home, but he seems to have lost his memory. Sookie, initially reluctant to get involved in vampire matters once again, takes Eric in. Eric's second in command, Pam, is relieved at Sookie finding Eric, and explains a coven of villainous witches, some of them also werewolves, has arrived in Shreveport, set on extorting money from Eric and taking over the local power he has. Hence, Pam believes the witches to be responsible for Eric's erased memory. After Sookie's brother Jason bargains on a financial settlement, Sookie agrees to keep Eric in her house and care for him, as the witches are on the lookout for Eric and might harm him.

The next day, Jason is missing. Sookie oversees the slowly progressing police investigation of her brother's disappearance, but personally fears the witch coven might've gotten hold of him.

Later on, Sookie informs werewolf Alcide Herveaux of the witch coven being in town. Alcide and his pack master fear that one of their pack members might have defected to the witches' side, but Sookie and Alcide then discover this particular woman's murdered body. Back in Bon Temps, Sookie's workplace is paid a visit to by the leaders of the witch coven, Marnie "Hallow" and Mark Stonebrook. Meanwhile, Sookie and Eric give in to their intense desire for each other.

Pam suggests Alcide's werewolf pack, her area vampires and some local Wiccans unite to fight off the witch coven. They do so and with Sookie's assistance, brutally attack the witches' main gathering place, wiping out everyone present but Hallow, whom Pam captures and forces to lift Eric's amnesia. Sookie returns home dismayed at the loss of her relationship with the memory-free Eric, and finally retrieves Jason with Sam's help in Hotshot, a local were-panther community. In Hotshot, Felton Norris, romantically interested in Jason's one-time fling Crystal, also a werepanther, had contained Jason and purposefully bit him to change him into a werepanther, so that Crystal would lose her interest in Jason.

=== Deaths ===
This novel marked the death of three previously introduced characters; Fangtasia's human waitress Ginger was killed by a witch curse, Fangtasia's replacement bartender Chow was staked in the climactic battle, and Alcide Herveaux's jealous, shapeshifter ex-girlfriend Debbie Pelt was shot to death by Sookie after invading Sookie's house intending to kill her.

== Television adaptation ==
The television adaptation, as the fourth season of True Blood, began its broadcast on June 26, 2011, and the season's finale was aired on September 11, 2011. Courtney Ford joined the cast as Portia Bellefleur, sister to Andy Bellefleur. Portia appeared in the previous three novels, but not in Dead to the World. She did not appear in the previous three seasons of True Blood. Alexandra Breckenridge was cast as Katarina, a member of Marnie's Wiccan group. Daniel Buran was cast as Marcus Bozeman, Alcide's pack master. In the novel, Alcide's packmaster was named Colonel Flood. Fiona Shaw was cast as Marnie "Hallow" Stonebrook. Characters from Dead to the World that appeared in True Blood's earlier seasons include Crystal Norris played by Lindsay Pulsipher, Felton Norris played by James Harvey Ward and Holly Cleary played by Lauren Bowles.

- In the series, Sookie returned from the fairy world at the beginning. In the novel, she didn't. She hasn't gotten a clue about being half-fairy yet.
- In the series, Eric buys Sookie's house from Jason because he never gave up hope Sookie would return. In the novel, the house is still Sookie's.
- In the series, the werewolves do not become involved in the vampire-witch feud. In fact, the pack leader Marcus orders the weres to stay out of the argument. In the novel, the Shreveport werewolves, headed by Colonel Flood, took part in the fight, along with some Wiccans and the Fangtasia vampires.
- In the series, Debbie Pelt is shot and killed by Sookie after shooting and presumably killing Tara, who was protecting Sookie. In the novel, Debbie broke into Sookie's and shot her, but Eric took the bullet instead. Then, Sookie shot Debbie, and Eric hid the corpse.
- In the series, Bill became the King of Louisiana after killing the former queen. He fights back the witches along the season. In the book, Bill is the area investigator, though he's gone to Peru in a mission. He only shows up during the attack to the witches.
- In the series, Jason is captured by the were-panthers and finally escapes by his own. In the novel, Sookie finds out where her brother is and rescues him.
- In the series, Eric got his memory back thanks to Sookie fairy powers. In the novel, Pam tortures Hallow (named Marnie in the series), so she reverts the curse. Also, in the books, Eric didn't remember the time he'd been blacked out.
- Antonia Gavilan da Logroño and her storyline with Marnie are exclusive to the series.
- The Wiccan Coven is led by siblings Marnie "Hallow" and Mark Stonebrooks in the book, but only by Marnie in the series. Roy can be seen as a replacement for Mark. Jesus Velasquez, a character exclusive to the TV series, and Lafayette, who died in the first novel, are part of the Coven.
- The Coven is addicted to vampire blood in the novel, and the Stonebrooks are also werewolves.

== See also ==
- List of The Southern Vampire Mysteries characters
- List of True Blood characters
- True Blood
