= All Together Dead =

Novel by Charlaine Harris

- Cover of All Together Dead
- Author: Charlaine Harris
- Language: English
- Series: The Southern Vampire Mysteries
- Genre: Fantasy, Mystery, Gothic, Romance
- Publisher: Ace Books
- Publication date: May 1, 2007
- Publication place: United States
- Media type: Print (Hardcover, Paperback) e-Book (Kindle); Audio Book (CD)
- Pages: 320 (paperback)
- ISBN: 978-0-441-01581-8
- OCLC: 213443210
- Preceded by: Definitely Dead
- Followed by: From Dead to Worse

All Together Dead is the seventh book in Charlaine Harris's series The Southern Vampire Mysteries, published May 2007 by Ace Books.

== Plot summary ==
The summit, which has attracted undead power players from all over the central United States, is sure to be tense, due partly to the ramping up of protests by the conservative, anti-vampire Fellowship of the Sun. Accused of murdering her husband, the King of Arkansas, Sophie-Anne is set to stand trial at the convention. The Queen is already in a precarious position, her power base weakened by the damage to New Orleans from Hurricane Katrina, and there are some vampires who would like to finish what nature started. Sophie-Anne's main accuser is Jennifer Cater, a vampire who had been training to be the king's lieutenant at the time of his death. Jennifer is determined to see Sophie-Anne staked in the sun for murdering the king, although Sookie knows the Queen is innocent of the crime.

Sophie-Anne plans to put Sookie's gift to good use, having her "listen in" on the thoughts of the humans working for the other vampires at the convention as well as for the hotel, as alliances are formed and allegiances tested in what can only be described as a political power struggle of potentially deadly implications. The story opens with Sookie entering Fangtasia to talk to Eric and those who pay him fealty, as they discuss the accusations against Sophie-Anne. Sookie agrees to work for Sophie-Anne, despite the warnings of her fairy godmother, Claudine, that being at the convention will forever tie Sookie to vampire politics in the mind of all of the attendees, in a very public way. Meanwhile, her relationship with Quinn heats up.

During the summit, Sookie meets all other characters who have short-story series with storylines independent from Sookie's: Dahlia Lynley-Chivers as one of the judges, Layla Larue Lemay as a part of the performing dancing duo, and Britlingens Batanya and Clovache as bodyguards.

At the convention, Sookie also meets Barry "Bellboy" Horowitz, the only other telepath she knows. Soon after they arrive, Jennifer Cater and most of the Arkansas entourage are brutally murdered, which simplifies the trial for the Queen. Sookie soon proves invaluable to the Queen as she makes the great suggestion that the Queen appoint her closest friend and "child," Andre, to be King of Arkansas, and then to marry him. Sookie also finds a bomb planted outside of the Louisiana suite, and saves the Queen. She also uncovers something shocking about Quinn—as a teen, he killed a group of men who were raping his mother, and then became indebted to some local vampires in order to cover up the crime. He had to work as a weretiger/gladiator in a ring for three years, and in the process became a fearsome fighter.

At the Queen's trial, Sookie saves the queen yet again as, being the only witness, she applies logic to prove that the queen is innocent and that her accusers are being manipulated. In response, one of the main accusers is staked right in the courtroom. Impressed with her usefulness, Andre accosts Sookie and begins to force her to exchange blood with him, to tie her permanently and closely to the queen. She escapes this violation only by the intercession of Eric, who has her exchange more blood with him. This third, major blood exchange with Eric causes Sookie to become more powerful, and frighteningly vampiric, even though she is still human. She can feel Eric very powerfully, and he now has the power to turn her into a vampire at any time. Sookie realizes with dread that she will never be free of Eric's control.

Sookie and Barry the Bellboy then put together a number of clues they have had throughout the convention and realize that multiple bombs have been planted throughout the hotel by the Fellowship of the Sun, and they are set to go off during the daytime when the vampires will all be asleep and helpless. She and Barry's quick thinking enable some vampires and some humans to get free, and Barry and Sookie team up to use their telepathy to find injured humans. Sookie finds Andre, who has only minor injuries, and watches impassively as Quinn stakes him in order to free her from his control. Queen Sophie-Anne escapes, but loses her legs. Sookie rescues Eric and Pam, and they and Bill escape with minor injuries, but the death toll for humans and vampires is very high.

== See also ==
- Characters of The Southern Vampire Mysteries
- Characters of True Blood
- True Blood
