= Dead as a Doornail =

2005 novel by Charlaine Harris

- Cover of Dead as a Doornail
- Author: Charlaine Harris
- Language: English
- Series: The Southern Vampire Mysteries
- Genre: Fantasy, Mystery, Gothic, Romance
- Publisher: Ace Books
- Publication date: May 3, 2005
- Publication place: United States
- Media type: Print (Hardcover, Paperback) e-Book (Kindle); Audio Book (CD)
- Pages: 320 (paperback)
- ISBN: 978-0-441-01333-3
- OCLC: 68566718
- Preceded by: Dead to the World
- Followed by: Definitely Dead

Dead as a Doornail is the fifth book in Charlaine Harris's series The Southern Vampire Mysteries.

== Summary ==
It's the first full moon since Jason was bitten by the werepanther Felton Norris (in Dead to the World). Calvin Norris comes to watch over him and help him, and Jason turns into a half man/half panther. Then Sam is shot in the leg and is therefore unable to run the bar. He asks Sookie to go to Fangtasia to ask Eric to lend him a bartender while he is out. Eric sends their new bartender, Charles Twining. Calvin Norris is also shot and seriously wounded, and Sookie learns that other shifters and were-animals are being shot throughout Louisiana. Calvin suspects Jason, based on the theory that Jason is angry at weres for turning him into a werepanther. Known for dispensing their own kind of justice, the real shooter needs to be found before the werepanthers turn on Jason. Colonel Flood, leader of the Long Tooth pack of Shreveport, is hit by a car and dies, so the pack needs a new leader. Alcide's father throws his hat into the ring, and Alcide manipulates Sookie into helping his father by reading the minds of others in the pack. Bill begins to date Selah Pumphrey, a real estate agent, from the nearby town of Clarice. Someone tries to burn down Sookie's house, but she is saved by her fairy godmother, Claudine. A dead man (killed by Charles Twining during the fire) is found outside her house, covered in gasoline, with a Fellowship of the Sun card in his wallet, so he is blamed for the arson.

Sookie is then shot while leaving the library, presumably because she associates with shifters. Ballistics says that her bullet matches the bullets of all the others who were shot, except Sam's. Later, Sookie is in an alley with Sam (in his dog form) trying to find the killer, when Sweetie Des Arts, Merlotte's cook, comes at her with a gun. Sweetie explains that she was bitten by a werewolf, and has become part shifter. As an act of revenge, she now kills any shifter she comes in contact with. Tray Dawson, a werewolf who was sent to protect Sookie by Calvin Norris, is shot in this confrontation, and Sweetie is shot and killed by Andy Bellefleur, when he arrives on the scene. Thinking that the problem has been solved, Sookie returns to work at Merlotte's. The befuddled Bubba shows up at the back door to tell Sookie Eric has been trying to reach her, and adds he sent him over to tell Sookie that someone is a hit man. She is then attacked by Charles Twining. It is revealed that Charles was sent by Hot Rain, Longshadow's "maker", to hurt Eric, who had killed Longshadow (Dead Until Dark). Although Eric had paid restitution for the killing, Hot Rain felt that Eric's penalty was not sufficient, and wanted to take something Eric held dear, and therefore chooses Sookie. It becomes apparent that Twining is the one who shot Sam, knowing that Sookie would come looking for a replacement bartender, and that he is also the one who set fire to Sookie's house, then framed an innocent man for it.

In a subplot, Tara Thorton has been dumped by vampire Franklin Mott, whom she dated in Club Dead, and is now under the thumb of one of Franklin's associates, the vampire Mickey. It turns out that Franklin Mott gave her to Mickey as part of a debt payment. It was once common for vampires to trade around their groupies, draining them to death when they grew bored. Sookie appeals to Eric, who arranges to have Mickey free Tara. Mickey becomes enraged, attacks Tara, wounds Eric, and tries to kill Sookie. In exchange for his help, Sookie must tell Eric what happened during the days he cannot remember (in Dead to the World). Sookie tells him about their passionate sexual relationship, as well as how she killed Debbie Pelt.

The competition for wolfpack leader takes place and there are different rounds to test the werewolves' strength. Sookie discovers that Patrick is cheating in the endurance test. She tells everyone, and as punishment the judges make the final test one that must be done until grievous injury or death. Patrick wins, and after he is declared victor, kills Alcide's father regardless. It is at this event that Sookie makes her first acquaintance with the were tiger, Quinn.

== See also ==
- Characters of The Southern Vampire Mysteries
- Characters of True Blood
- True Blood: The Fifth Season
- True Blood
