= Definitely Dead =

2006 book by Charlaine Harris

- Cover of Definitely Dead
- Author: Charlaine Harris
- Language: English
- Series: The Southern Vampire Mysteries
- Genre: Fantasy, Mystery, Gothic, Romance
- Publisher: Penguin Group (USA)
- Publication date: May 2, 2006
- Publication place: United States
- Media type: Print (Hardcover, Paperback) e-Book (Kindle); Audio Book (CD)
- Pages: 352 (paperback)
- ISBN: 978-0-441-01491-0
- OCLC: 122934639
- Preceded by: Dead as a Doornail
- Followed by: All Together Dead

Definitely Dead is the sixth book in Charlaine Harris's series The Southern Vampire Mysteries.

== Plot summary ==
After surviving a Were attack while attending a play in Shreveport with her new boyfriend John Quinn, Sookie Stackhouse goes to New Orleans to sort out the affairs of her cousin Hadley, a vampire who was murdered. When she arrives, she finds Hadley's apartment under a stasis spell that was placed there by the talented and helpful young witch Amelia Broadway, Hadley's landlady. When the spell is removed, Sookie and Amelia are attacked by a newly turned vampire (later revealed to be a Were named Jake Purifoy) whose rising was delayed due to Amelia's stasis spell. Sookie and Amelia are taken to the emergency room after this attack and it is here that Bill, due to Eric interfering, tells Sookie the truth behind his move to Bon Temps.

The following night, Sookie calls on the Queen of Louisiana, Sophie-Anne Leclerq, and her new husband, the vampire king of Arkansas, Peter Threadgill. Their conversation eventually leads to the revelation that Amelia and some of her peers plan to magically reconstruct the events of the night of Jake Purifoy's turning. Sophie-Anne decides that this is something she would like to see, so she, her entourage, and Sookie go back to Hadley's together where they find the witches ready to perform the ectoplasmic reconstruction spell. Once the spell runs its course, Sophie-Anne, Andre, and Sookie go into Hadley's apartment for a private conversation where, among other things (such as Sookie being told that she has fairy blood and therefore attracts supernaturals), Sophie-Anne asks Sookie to look carefully through Hadley's things and locate a missing diamond bracelet that was given to the queen by Threadgill; the discovery that this bracelet is missing would mean political disaster for Sophie-Anne.

Quinn is also in New Orleans on business, and so the couple is together when a group of Weres break into Hadley's apartment to kidnap Sookie and transport her to the Pelt family. With cunning on their part, and help from Eric and the vampire Rasul, Sookie is able to resolve her differences with the Pelts.

Sookie and Quinn attend the party Sophie-Anne and Peter throw in celebration of their new union. The night ends in violence. Events that take place once the fighting breaks out directly influence the events of the seventh book, "All Together Dead." Sookie and a wounded Quinn make it back to Hadley's apartment. The next day, Sookie, Amelia, Bob the cat, and Everett (the young man Mr. Cataliades sends to help Sookie with Hadley's apartment) make their way back to Bon Temps.

== See also ==
- Characters of The Southern Vampire Mysteries
- Characters of True Blood
- True Blood
- Audio Book ISBN 141939326X
