= From Dead to Worse =

2008 novel by Charlaine Harris

- Cover of From Dead to Worse
- Author: Charlaine Harris
- Language: English
- Series: The Southern Vampire Mysteries
- Genre: Fantasy, Mystery, Gothic, Romance
- Publisher: Ace Books
- Publication date: May 6, 2008
- Publication place: United States
- Media type: Print (Hardcover, Paperback) e-Book (Kindle); Audio Book (CD)
- Pages: 336 (paperback)
- ISBN: 978-0-441-01589-4
- OCLC: 213443210
- Preceded by: All Together Dead
- Followed by: Dead and Gone

From Dead to Worse is a paranormal mystery novel by Charlaine Harris published in 2008. It is the eighth book of The Southern Vampire Mysteries series featuring Sookie Stackhouse, a telepathic cocktail waitress from Louisiana.

== Plot summary ==
After the natural disaster of Hurricane Katrina and the man-made horror of the explosion at the vampire Summit, Sookie Stackhouse is safe but dazed, yearning for things to get back to normal. But her boyfriend, the weretiger Quinn, is missing.

She then learns that she is descended from fairies, and is 1/8 fairy herself. Her beloved grandmother had an affair with a half-fairy, and had two children with him. While her grandfather is dead, her fairy great-grandfather, Niall Brigant, is alive and seeks to meet her.

Sookie is soon drawn into investigating several mysterious deaths among the local Were community. Her telepathy and status as a 'friend of the pack' forces her to mediate between two warring factions, whereupon she discovers that a pack displaced by Hurricane Katrina has been killing the Shreveport Weres in order to take their place. There is a brief "war" between the two packs, with the Shreveport pack emerging victorious, Alcide now in charge.

At the same time, Felipe de Castro, King of Nevada, begins a violent campaign to wrest control of the kingdoms of Louisiana and Arkansas from the injured Queen Sophie-Anne Leclerq. The King's men kill the Queen and all of the sheriffs of Louisiana except for Eric, who surrenders in exchange for his life and the lives of all under his protection. Meanwhile, Sookie is upset to learn that she now has a very close blood bond with Eric, and can detect his feelings and know his location, and that she craves his company.

She learns that Quinn has been absent because his mother escaped from a were sanatorium where the mentally unstable weretiger was being held. In exchange for help in recapturing her, Quinn became the prisoner of the King of Nevada. She decides that given Quinn's familial responsibilities, she does not wish to have a romantic relationship with him. Instead she renews her relationship with Eric Northman.

She also has an upsetting encounter with the werepanthers of Hot Shot. Her sister-in-law, Crystal, is unfaithful to her brother, which means that, based on the particular traditions of Hot Shot, Sookie is required to break the hand of Crystal's uncle and Sookie's friend, Calvin Norris. This causes a rupture in her relationship with Jason, and she stops talking to him.

Sookie rescues King Felipe de Castro, Eric, and Sam Merlotte from the murderous intentions of Sigebert, earning her the King's gratitude. She then goes to visit her late cousin Hadley's child, whom she's never met and didn't know existed, and finds out he is a telepath like her. The book ends as she promises the boy and his father she'll be there to help whenever they need it.

== Reception ==
Publishers Weekly said that "Harris outdoes herself in this pivotal eighth Sookie Stackhouse novel", hinting at a "shock ending that will delight longtime fans".

== See also ==
- Characters of The Southern Vampire Mysteries
- Characters of True Blood
- True Blood
- Audio Book ISBN 1436105196
