= Dead in the Family =

2010 gothic mystery novel by Charlaine Harris

- Cover of Dead In the Family
- Author: Charlaine Harris
- Language: English
- Series: The Southern Vampire Mysteries
- Genre: Fantasy, Mystery, Gothic
- Publisher: Ace Books
- Publication date: May 4, 2010
- Publication place: United States
- Pages: 320
- ISBN: 978-0-441-01864-2
- Preceded by: Dead and Gone
- Followed by: Dead Reckoning

Dead in the Family is a 2010 New York Times Bestselling Gothic mystery novel by Charlaine Harris and the tenth book in her The Southern Vampire Mysteries series. The novel was released on May 4, 2010, by Ace Books and follows Sookie as she deals with her increasingly more complicated romantic and personal relationships with the supernatural creatures around her.

== Plot summary ==
When the novel begins, Sookie Stackhouse is still recovering physically and emotionally from the torture she received at the hands of demented fairies Lochlan and Neave in the previous book (Dead and Gone). She has finally settled into a relationship with the Viking vampire Eric, and her errant brother Jason seems to have his life in order, too, with a solid new girlfriend, Michele. But all the other people in Sookie's life—Eric himself, her former lover Bill, her friend and boss Sam—are having family problems. Eric's maker, Appius Livius Ocella, shows up with Eric's ‘brother’ in tow—he is Alexei Romanov, only son of the last Czar of Russia, who as an adolescent witnessed the Bolshevik Revolution, including the slaughter of his entire family. He developed emotional problems as a result. Appius has sought Eric out as a last resort, to see if Eric can help restore Alexei to sanity. Meanwhile, Bill is still suffering from the silver poisoning he got via the teeth of Neave when he rescued Sookie from her torturers. He is not getting better, and may only be able to be cured by the blood of a vampire made by Bill's maker, the dead Lorena, but Bill refuses to ask his sibling for help.

The furor raised by the coming out of the two-natured continues, as Calvin Norris reveals himself to his co-workers and Sam's family deals with the news of having the two-natured in the family. Certain forces are agitating for a were registration system, and the weres suspect that they are under surveillance by the government.

Sookie begins to recover from her torture at the hands of Lochlan and Neave, but still has post-traumatic stress and anxiety. She wants to kill Victor because she realizes he is a major threat to Eric, Pam, and Bill, wanting them dead. But Sookie struggles with the idea of killing Victor in cold blood, rather than in the heat of battle or in self-defense. Victor sends assassins to kill Sookie, Pam, and Bill, without success. Sookie's cousin Claude comes to live with her, claiming he suffers without the company of other fairies (his triplets, Claudine and Claudette, are now deceased). Sookie's mad half-fae uncle, Dermot, has been wandering the property for reasons unknown, as has another unidentified fairy. Sookie seeks out Bill's "sibling", Judith Vardamon, to ask for her help. She learns that Judith was made vampire by Lorena in an attempt to placate a sullen Bill, her reasoning being that having a companion who so resembled Bill's late wife would please him. However, Bill avoids contact with Judith, believing that she blames him for her vampiric state. Judith won't contact Bill because she fears and hates Lorena. Sookie contacts Judith for the sake of Bill's health. Upon learning of Lorena's death, Judith is overjoyed and happily anticipatory of her visit with Bill. Her blood serves to heal him, and the two seem to build a rapport quickly.

Sookie is called upon to babysit her cousin Hadley's young son, Hunter, who is also telepathic. She helps him with the social nuances of being telepathic. Sookie attends a trial by the Shreveport pack, to learn why the body of Basim, a new were, was found buried on her property. She learns that Alcide's second is the bloodthirsty Jannalynn, who is dating Sam Merlotte. Sookie struggles to prevent the pack from killing any of their own. Ultimately, she learns that Colman, father of the baby Claudine was carrying, is seeking revenge on Sookie for the part he perceives she played in Claudine's death. He was going to kill her, but after seeing her mothering Hunter, he can't bear to kill her, and instead wants her to be arrested. Meanwhile, Alexei has been carelessly draining people and refusing to be controlled by Appius, and Eric struggles to control him. Ultimately, Alexei attacks and almost kills Pam and Eric, and kills Bobby Burnham (Eric's "day man"), and Felicia. The stories converge at Sookie's house, where Eric kills Alexei, Colman kills Appius Livius while attempting to kill Sookie, and Dermot kills Colman. Sookie and Claude free Dermot from the spell that had made him mad.

== Characters in Dead in the Family ==
=== Main characters ===
- Sookie Stackhouse
- Eric Northman

=== Recurring characters ===
- Alcide Herveaux
- Bill Compton
- Claude Crane
- Dermot Brigant
- Hunter Savoy
- Jannalynn Hopper
- Jason Stackhouse
- Judith Vardamon
- Kennedy Keyes
- Michele Schubert
- Pam
- Remy Savoy
- Sam Merlotte
- Tara Thornton

=== Nonrecurring characters ===
- Alexei Romanov
- Annabelle Bannister
- Appius Livius Ocella
- Colman

== Reception ==
Critical reception for Dead in the Family was mostly positive, with the News and Sentinel giving the novel a positive review. Publishers Weekly and the Los Angeles Times also praised the book, with the Los Angeles Times saying that the book had "genuine heart". Tor.com gave a mixed review for Dead in the Family, praising Harris for creating an interesting world and characters, but stating that "even she is getting tired of these people".

== See also ==
- The Southern Vampire Mysteries
- List of The Southern Vampire Mysteries characters
