= Niall Brigant =

Fictional character created by Charlaine Harris

Niall Brigant is a fictional character from The Southern Vampire Mysteries by author Charlaine Harris. He first appears in From Dead to Worse. He is Sookie and Jason Stackhouse's great-grandfather and Claude and Claudine's grandfather. He is tall and slim, extremely handsome with long pale gold hair. Sookie describes Niall as being a lovely creature and having some age to him.

He tells Sookie that his son, Fintan, and Sookie's grandmother, Adele, had two children: Corbett (her father) and Linda (her aunt and Hadley's mother). Adele's husband could not give her children due to a prior bout with mumps, which left him sterile. Niall is a fairy prince who has powerful enemies and wants to keep his new relationship with his great-granddaughter secret to protect her. In Dead and Gone it is revealed Niall's nephew, Breandan, is out to kill all those humans who have fairy blood in them and that, for a long time, Fintan was able to keep Sookie's whereabouts secret. It is this desire to destroy that leads to a Fairy War.

== Portrayal ==
In the television series True Blood, which is based on The Southern Vampire Mysteries, Rutger Hauer portrayed Niall Brigant.
