= Sam Merlotte =

- True Blood character
- Sam Trammell as Sam Merlotte in True Blood.
- First appearance: Novel: Dead Until Dark; Television: "Strange Love"
- Created by: Charlaine Harris
- Portrayed by: Sam Trammell; Martin Spanjers (young Sam)

In-universe information
- Species: Shape shifter
- Occupation: Business owner Bartender
- Nationality: American

Sam Merlotte is a fictional character from The Southern Vampire Mysteries book series, written by author Charlaine Harris. He is introduced in the first novel of the series, Dead Until Dark. In True Blood, the HBO television adaptation, Sam is portrayed by actor Sam Trammell.

At the beginning of the series, Sam Merlotte is Sookie Stackhouse's employer and the owner of Merlotte's Bar and Grill in the fictional town of Bon Temps, Louisiana.

Sam is a shape shifter (or "shifter") and has the ability to physically transform into an animal he has seen (and imprinted on) at will. When Sam is introduced, the existence of shape shifters is not public knowledge (unlike vampires following the Great Revelation prior to the events of True Blood and The Southern Vampire Mysteries series).

== Fictional history ==
=== The Southern Vampire Mysteries ===
Sam is an army veteran who grew up in Wright, Texas. After his father died, he used his inheritance to buy the local bar in Bon Temps. His father and mother are both shape shifters.

After his birth father dies, his mother remarries a human male. Sam and his mother keep their abilities secret from his stepfather, brother, and sister. Sam is the only sibling to inherit the shape shifting ability, as lore states only the first-born of a shapeshifting couple inherits the ability to change.

All shapeshifters have a "go-to" animal, based on which feels most similar to their personality. Sam's preferred shape is a border collie. (In the eighth novel, he transforms into a lion to protect Sookie from werewolves.) Like all shapeshifters, Sam feels a strong instinct to transform during the full moon.

==== Personality ====
He is a reserved person and does not easily express his feelings. Although he is welcomed and accepted by the community of Bon Temps, he does not have many friends and few people know his past.

==== Relationship with Sookie Stackhouse ====
In Dead Until Dark, Sookie is working as a waitress at Sam's bar. Sam is romantically interested in Sookie; although they have kissed on more than one occasion, the two have never dated. Sam does not reveal his feelings until after she begins dating Bill Compton. Sam encourages Sookie to stay away from vampires. Both Sookie and Sam tend to be suspicious of the other's choices in romantic partners.

Sookie is hurt emotionally after discovering that Sam is a shapeshifter. He had been open in his friendship with her and believed trust to be an important value in their relationship.

In Dead Ever After, the final book in the series, Sam and Sookie begin a romantic relationship. In the companion book, After Dead: What Came Next in The World of Sookie Stackhouse, it is revealed that Sookie and Sam get married and have four children. Sookie and Sam continue to tend Merlotte's until their retirement.

=== True Blood ===
Sam's storyline in True Blood, the television adaptation, diverges significantly from character in the novels. Martin Spanjers plays a young Sam Merlotte in the episodes "I Don't Wanna Know" in season one and "Nothing But the Blood" in season two.

==== Family and background ====
As a child, Sam was adopted by the Merlotte family. The family abandoned him when his abilities appeared at 15 years old.

As a homeless teenager, Sam met Maryann Forrester, an immortal Maenad with the ability to transform her entire body, or selected parts, into other creatures. During a sexual encounter with Sam, she displays some of her powers. Frightened, Sam stole a change of clothes and $100,000 in cash from her dresser while Maryann showered, escaping and later using the money to buy the local bar in Bon Temps.

In the third season of the series, Sam travels to Arkansas to find his biological family, the Mickens. He discovers that his biological mother, Melinda, and his younger brother, Tommy, are also shapeshifters. Soon after they meet, he learns that his father has repeatedly forced his mother and Tommy to compete in dog fights. Disgusted, Sam takes Tommy to live with him back to Bon Temps.

In the fourth season, Tommy returns to visit his mother. His father, Joe Lee Mickens, attacks Tommy in an attempt to capture him and force him to participate in dog fighting once again. Tommy kills Joe Lee with a pipe but also accidentally hits Melinda with the pipe, killing her. According to the lore of the series, shapeshifters who kill other shapeshifters become skinwalkers, capable of turning into any animal (including humans) on Earth. Extended skinwalking wreaks havoc on the skinwalker's body and can be fatal.

Tommy uses his newfound skinwalker powers to transform into a human and imitate Sam. Disguised as Sam, Tommy fires Sookie from the bar and sleeps with Sam's girlfriend, Luna. When he discovers what Tommy has done, Sam kicks Tommy out. Tommy is fatally beaten by Marcus (Luna's werewolf ex-boyfriend) and his pack while once again skinwalking as Sam who reconciles with his brother moments before Tommy dies.

==== Relationships ====
===== Tara Thornton =====
In the first season, Sam starts a noncommittal sexual relationship with Tara Thornton.

===== Maryann Forrester =====
As established in the second season, Sam has a difficult relationship with the maenad Maryann. Maryann comes to Bon Temps looking for him as she is convinced that he is the sacrificial victim she needs to bring forth her god, Dionysus.

Daphne Landry, a new waitress at Merlotte's, reveals herself to Sam as a fellow shifter. The two bond and begin a relationship until it's revealed that she's working for Maryann and trying to lure him into a trap. When Maryann murders her, Sam becomes the prime suspect.

In the season finale, Sam and Bill concoct a scheme to eliminate Maryann. Sam shifts into a white bull, the symbol for Maryann's god; with her defenses down, Sam impales her with his horns and transforms back to his human self to tear out her heart.

===== Bill Compton =====
At the beginning of the third season, Bill and Sam have a short seductive gay scene. This is revealed to be a dream sequence: a consequence of drinking Bill's vampire blood.

===== Luna Garza =====
In the fourth season, Sam joins a group of fellow shifters and starts a romance with one of its members, Luna Garza.

In season five, when members of Sam's shifter circle are killed by mysterious masked assailants, Luna's daughter Emma is nearly shot. Emma escapes to her grandmother Martha Bozeman and her werewolf pack in Shreveport. The assailants turn out to be an anti-supernatural gang led by former sheriff Bud Dearborne. Emma is abducted by Russell Edgington and Steve Newlin and taken to the Vampire Authority. Sam and Luna manage to infiltrate the Authority headquarters. Sam finds Steve's room and convinces Luna to skinwalk as Steve to rescue Emma. Luna is forced to make a live television announcement in Steve's form. Halfway through the interview, Luna shifts back into her real form on camera and reveals the existence of shifters to the world.

Sick from her extensive skin-walking, Luna dies in the first episode of the sixth season after making Sam promise to take care of Emma.

===== Nicole Wright =====
In the sixth season, Sam meets Nicole Wright, a supernatural rights activist, who approaches him hoping to tell his story as a shifter. Sam rebuffs her. Alcide, now packmaster of Mississippi, asks him to return Emma to her grandmother. Sam refuses and Emma is forcibly taken by Alcide and Martha.

He encounters Nicole again when she approaches the werewolf pack intending to tell their story. Using this as a distraction, Sam takes Emma back and ultimately rescues Nicole when she is attacked by the pack. He eventually returns Emma to Martha under the provision they don't return to the pack. Sam and Alcide make amends. Sam and Nicole begin a relationship. Six months later, Sam has become mayor of Bon Temps. He signs Merlotte's Bar & Grill over to former waitress, Arlene Fowler Bellefleur.

In Season 7, Sam is outed to all the residents of Bon Temps as a shifter after being seen by a local named Vince. Nicole, Arlene, and waitress Holly Cleary are kidnapped by Hep-V infected vampires. After their rescue, Nicole decides to move closer to her parents in Chicago due to the predictable dangers of Bon Temps. Sam eventually agrees to go with her, leaving for Chicago without saying goodbye in person. He writes a heartfelt goodbye letter to Sookie and a single-line letter to Andy Bellefleur simply resigning as mayor.

In the show's epilogue, Sam returns to Bon Temps with Nicole and their toddler for Thanksgiving at Sookie's house.

== Portrayal and reception ==
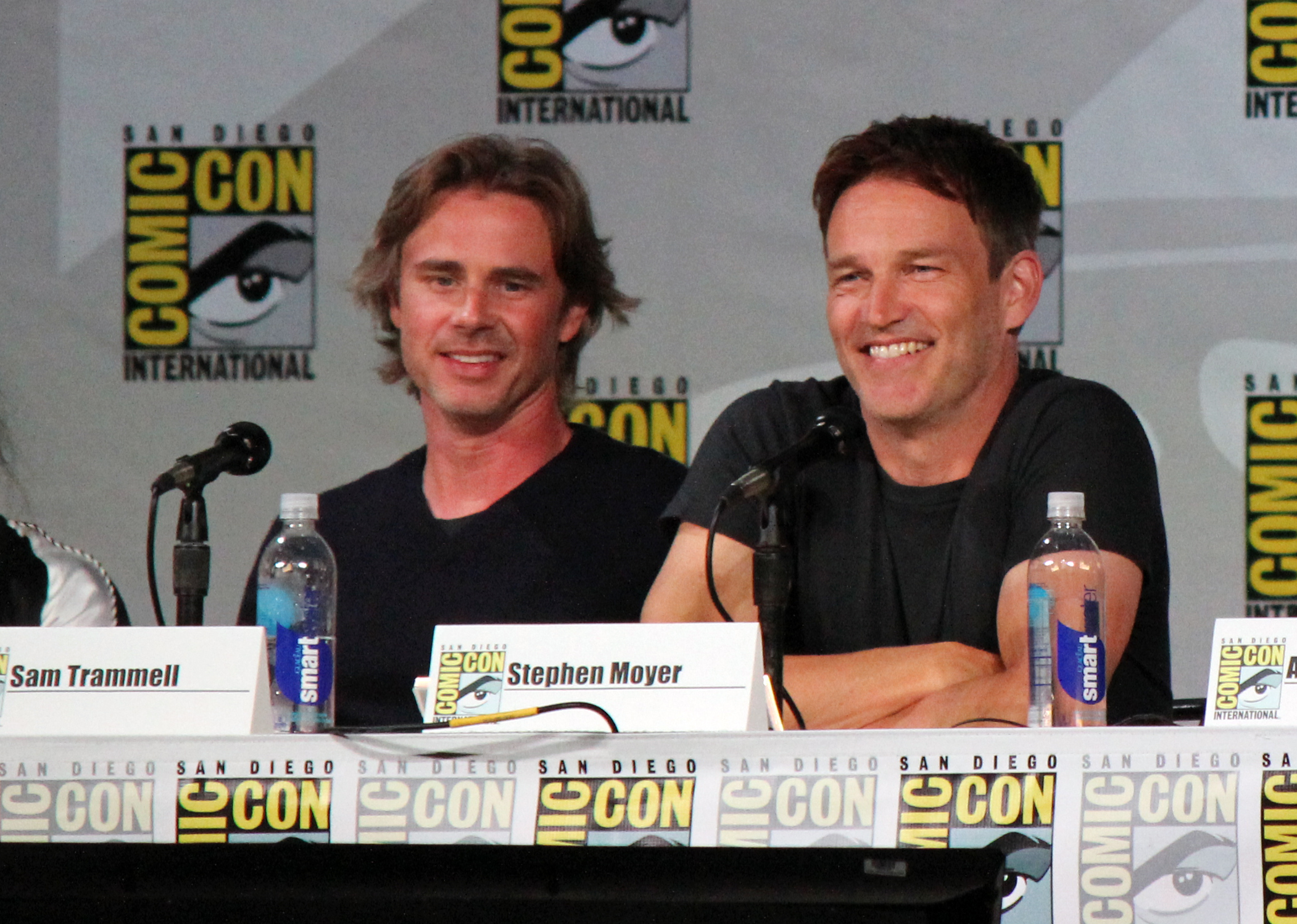
Sam Trammell (Sam Merlotte) and Stephen Moyer (Bill Compton) at San Diego Comic-Con in July 2014.

For his work as Sam Merlotte on True Blood, actor Sam Trammell was nominated for Best Breakout Performance (Male) at the 2009 Scream Awards, Best Supporting Actor at the 2010 Scream Awards, and Outstanding Performance by an Ensemble in a Drama Series at the 16th Annual Screen Actors Guild Awards.
