= My Big Fat Supernatural Honeymoon =

2007 Paranormal romance and horror anthology

- My Big Fat Supernatural Honeymoon
- Author: P.N. Elrod
- Language: English
- Genre: Fantasy; Horror; Paranormal romance
- Publisher: St. Martin's Griffin
- Publication date: December 26, 2007
- Publication place: United States
- Media type: Print (paperback) e-Book (Kindle); Audio Book (MP3, CD)
- Pages: 368
- ISBN: 978-0-312-37504-1
- OCLC: 181335833
- Dewey Decimal: 813.087380806
- LC Class: PS648.H6 M89 2008
- Preceded by: My Big Fat Supernatural Wedding

My Big Fat Supernatural Honeymoon, edited by P.N. Elrod, is the 2007 sequel to the 2006 book My Big Fat Supernatural Wedding. Honeymoon is an anthology of honeymoon stories contributed by several authors such as the author of the Otherworld series Kelley Armstrong, the author of The Morganville Vampires series Rachel Caine, and many more.

== List of stories ==
| Author | Title | Page | Series |
|---|---|---|---|
| Kelley Armstrong | Stalked | 1 | Otherworld |
| Jim Butcher | Heorot | 35 | Dresden Files |
| Rachel Caine | Roman Holiday, or SPQ-arrrrrr | 81 | Dead Man's Chest |
| P.N. Elrod | Her Mother's Daughter | 123 | Vampire Files |
| Caitlin Kittredge | Newlydeads | 162 | Black London |
| Marjorie M. Liu | Where the Heart Lives | 205 | Dirk & Steele |
| Katie MacAlister | Cat Got Your Tongue? | 242 | Dark One |
| Lilith Saintcrow | Half of Being Married | 278 | |
| Ronda Thompson | A Wulf in Groom's Clothing | 324 | Wild Wulfs of London |

== Stories ==
=== Heorot ===
Heorot is a work written by Jim Butcher set in The Dresden Files universe that follows Harry Dresden, a professional wizard. Dresden is hired to investigate the disappearance of a woman on the day of her wedding prior to leaving on honeymoon.

=== Roman Holiday, or SPQ-arrrrrr ===
Roman Holiday, or SPQ-arrrrrr is the second part of a romance story, featuring a damsel-in-distress heroine, continued from the book My Big Fat Supernatural Wedding.

== Awards ==
The book made the New York Times Best Seller extended list and won Honorable Mention in the 2007 Pearl Awards for best anthology.
