= Katie MacAlister =

American novelist

- Born: March 15, 1964 (age 62)
- Occupation: Novelist
- Writing career
- Pen name: Katie Maxwell
- Period: 2002–present
- Genres: historical novels, paranormal romance, young adult novels
- Website: www.katiemacalister.com

Katie MacAlister (born March 15, 1964) is a Seattle-area author of fiction and non-fiction. Her most popular titles are historical, contemporary, and paranormal romance. She also writes young-adult books under the pseudonym Katie Maxwell and mysteries under the pseudonym Kate Marsh.

MacAlister's contemporary and historical books frequently feature flawed Anglophile heroines who are tall, Rubenesque, klutzy, or divorced. Their male counterparts are typically men who have had something happen in their past.

== Bibliography ==
=== Aisling Grey, Guardian series ===
1. You Slay Me (2004)
2. Fire Me Up (2005)
3. Light My Fire (2006)
4. Holy Smokes (2007)

=== Silver Dragons series ===
1. Playing with Fire (2008)
2. Up in Smoke (2008)
3. Me and My Shadow (2009)

=== Light Dragons series ===
1. Love in the Time of Dragons (2010)
2. The Unbearable Lightness of Dragons (2011)
3. Sparks Fly (2012)

=== Dragon Fall series ===
1. Dragonblight (2021)
2. Dragon Fall (2015)
3. Dragon Storm (2015)
4. Dragon Soul (2016)

=== The Dark Ones series ===
1. A Girl's Guide To Vampires (2003)
2. Sex and the Single Vampire (2004)
3. Sex, Lies, and Vampires (2005)
4. Even Vampires Get the Blues (2006)
5. The Last of the Red Hot Vampires (2007)
6. Zen and the Art of Vampires (2008)
7. Crouching Vampire, Hidden Fang (2009)
8. In the Company of Vampires (2010)
9. Much Ado About Vampires (2011)
10. A Tale of Two Vampires (2012)
11. The Vampire Always Rises (2017)

=== Traveller series ===
1. Time Thief (2013)
2. The Art of Stealing Time (2013)

=== Contemporary romance ===
- Improper English (2003)
- Men in Kilts (2003)
- Bird of Paradise (novella) (2003)
- The Corset Diaries (2004)
- Hard Day's Knight (2005)
- Blow Me Down (2005)
- It's All Greek To Me (2011)

==== Ainsley Brothers series ====
- The Importance of Being Alice (2015)
- A Midsummer Night's Romp (2015)
- Daring in a Blue Dress (2016)
- The Perils of Paulie (2016)

=== Steampunk ===
- Steamed (2010)

=== Noble series ===
- Noble Intentions (2002)
- Noble Destiny (2003)
- The Trouble With Harry (2004)
- The Truth About Leo (2014)

=== Paranormal Romance Anthologies ===
Anthology or Collection	Contents	Publication Date	Editor
Just One Sip	Bring Out Your Dead	Oct 2006	Katie MacAlister Jennifer Ashley Minda Webber
My Big Fat Supernatural Honeymoon	Cat Got Your Tongue?	Dec 2007	P.N. Elrod
My Zombie Valentine	Bring Out Your Dead	Jan 2010	Katie MacAlister Angie Fox Lisa Cach Mari Mancusi
Cupid Cats	Unleashed	Jul 2010	Katie MacAlister Vicki Lewis Thompson Connie Brockway
Death's Excellent Vacation	The Perils of Effrijim	Aug 2010	Charlaine Harris Toni L. P. Kelner

=== Mysteries ===
(as Kate Marsh)

- Ghost of a Chance (2008)

=== Novellas ===
- Ain't Myth-behaving [Two Novellas]

=== Young Adult ===
(as Katie Maxwell)

- 2003 – The Year My Life Went Down The Loo
- 2004 – They Wear What Under Their Kilts?
- 2004 – Eyeliner of the Gods
- 2004 – What's French For "Ew"?
- 2004 – The Taming of the Dru
- 2005 – Got Fangs?
- 2005 – Life, Love and the Pursuit of Hotties
- 2006 – Circus of the Darned
