= Glass Houses (novel) =

2006 young adult novel by Rachel Caine

- Author: Rachel Caine
- Language: English
- Series: The Morganville Vampires
- Genre: Young Adult urban fantasy/vampire
- Publisher: New American Library
- Publication date: October 3, 2006
- Publication place: United States
- Media type: Print (Paperback)
- Pages: 256
- ISBN: 978-0451219947
- Followed by: The Dead Girls' Dance

Glass Houses is a 2006 young adult urban fantasy/vampire novel by Rachel Caine. It has been on the New York Times best selling list.

== Plot ==
College freshman Claire Danvers is having a rough time at Texas Prairie University. After a humiliating incident in her dorm room, she decides to look for off-campus housing and finds a room in an imposing old house owned by the mysterious and intimidating Mrs. Amelie. Claire's new roommates, Eve Rosser, Shane Collins, and Michael Glass, are all a bit eccentric, but Claire is relieved to have a safe and quiet place to study and escape the drama of college life.

However, things in Morganville aren't as they seem. The town is ruled by a group of vampires, and the humans who live there are forced to follow strict rules to avoid being fed upon. Claire quickly learns that her new roommates are all part of this supernatural world, with Eve and Shane being humans who have been living in Morganville for a while and Michael being a vampire who is trying to resist his nature.

As Claire delves deeper into the world of Morganville, she discovers that the town's deepest secrets are crawling out, hungry for fresh blood. Monica Morrell, a cruel and sadistic resident of the house, is determined to make Claire's life a living hell. Richard Morrell, Monica's older brother and the mayor of Morganville, is struggling to maintain order and protect the town's human population. And then there's Oliver, a powerful and ancient vampire who seems to have a grudge against Michael and a strange fascination with Claire.

Claire is torn between her desire to maintain a normal college life and her need to survive in a town full of dangerous and unpredictable supernatural creatures. She finds herself caught in the middle of a conflict between the vampires and the humans, and as the situation escalates, she realizes that she may be the only one who can save the town from being destroyed.

As she faces off against the town's terror, Claire is forced to confront her own fears and limitations. She must learn to trust her roommates and rely on her own ingenuity if she wants to survive. But even as she fights to protect herself and those she cares about, she can't shake the feeling that there's something dark and dangerous lurking just beneath the surface of Morganville, waiting for the right moment to strike.

Will Michael and Claire be able to face the town's terror and rise to the challenge, or will she drown like everyone else in the depths of Morganville's supernatural secrets Michael reveals that he believes it was the house that kept him alive. He also warns her that there are more dangerous vampires lurking that Brandon therefore she needs to be careful.

== Characters ==
- Claire Danvers: The protagonist of the series, a human who moves to Morganville, Texas, after her parents' divorce. She is initially skeptical of the vampire population in town but eventually comes to embrace their presence. Claire is a strong and independent character who is willing to stand up for what she believes in.
- Eve Rosser: Claire's best friend and a human. She is compassionate and caring, but she can also be ruthless when necessary. Eve is fiercely loyal to Claire and will do anything to protect her.
- Shane Collins: A human and the a member of the Glass House, also a bit of a bad boy. Shane has a complicated relationship with Claire, but he eventually comes to care for her deeply.
- Michael Glass: A ghost who Haunts the Glass House by day, although at night is as regular and solid as everybody else, nobody knows he’s a ghost until Claire accidentally finds out, bringing him and Claire closer as friends.
- Monica Morrell: A bully who goes to Claire’s school, she has a very vindictive side and is prone to violence (usually getting her 2 lackeys to do the dirty work)
- Richard Morrell: Monicas brother, the mayor of Morganville and a man who always has the air of somebody tired of trying to keep things together. He knows what kind of person his sister is but still cares about her all the same.
- Oliver: A vampire who runs a local coffee shop where vampires and humans can enter freely as long as everybody is civil, has a hipster demeanour but as the book goes on we find out more about him.
- Amelie: The vampire who runs morganville. She is 1500 over years old and exceptionally strong, what she says, goes.
- Brandon: A vampire who thinks he’s badder than what he is, tries to act tough but really he’s just Monica’s bulldog when she won’t do anything herself. He has a dangerous side to him and cannot be trusted, especially around humans.

== Online show ==
The whole Morganville Vampires series was turned into an online web series in 2013. That has won the Comicpalooza official selection in 2015 along with Raindance WebFest official selection of 2015.
