= Jackie Kessler =

American author

- Born: United States
- Occupation: Author
- Writing career
- Pen name: J. M. Kaye
- Period: 2005–present
- Genres: Young adult fiction, superhero fiction, paranormal romance, urban fantasy
- Website: www.jackiekessler.com

Jackie Kessler, also known as Jackie Morse Kessler, is an American author of young adult, superhero, paranormal romance, and urban fantasy fiction, including novels, novellas, short stories, and comic books.

== Writing career ==
Kessler's work includes the Hell on Earth urban fantasy paranormal romance series, as well as a tie-in novella, Eternal Lover called A Hell of a Time. She has had numerous short stories published in various magazines, including Realms of Fantasy and Farthing. In 2009, Kessler published the superhero novel Black and White with co-author Caitlin Kittredge. The sequel, Shades of Gray, was released in 2010. She has also written the young adult series "Riders of the Apocalypse".

In 2010, Kessler began writing for comic books, scripting "Vampire Noctem" for Tales from the Vampires from Dark Horse Comics, a story set in the Buffy the Vampire Slayer universe.

Previously, Kessler was the fantasy editor for Wild Child Publishing.

== Bibliography ==
=== Hell on Earth ===
- Hell’s Belles (Kensington/Zebra Books, January 2007 - trade; September 2008 - mass-market paperback) (2007, 2008)
- The Road to Hell (Kensington/Zebra Books, November 2007 – trade; November 2009 - mass-market paperback) (2007, 2009)
- Hotter Than Hell (Kensington/Zebra Books, August 2008 – trade paperback) (2008)
- “A Hell of a Time”, Eternal Lover (Kensington Publishing Corp., April 2008 - trade; April 2009 - mass-market paperback) (2008, 2009)
- “Hell Is Where The Heart Is”, A Red Hot Valentine's Day (Avon Red, January 2009) (2009)
- "Hell to Pay", an online serial novel started 5/2010 - completed in 2011
- A Chance in Hell (2013)

=== Published works ===
- Shades of Gray, (2010), with Caitlin Kittredge. Icarus Project series
- Black and White, with Caitlin Kittredge (Bantam/Spectra, June 2009 – trade paperback). Icarus Project series
- A Hell of a Time, Eternal Lover (Kensington Publishing Corp., April 2009 - mass market)
- Hell Is Where The Heart Is, (Avon Red, January 2009 – trade paperback)
- Hell’s Belles, (Kensington/Zebra Books, September 2008 – mass-market paperback)
- Hotter Than Hell, (Kensington/Zebra Books, August 2008 – trade paperback)
- A Hell of a Time, Eternal Lover (Kensington Publishing Corp., April 2008 - trade paperback)
- The Road to Hell, (Kensington/Zebra Books, November 2007 – trade paperback)
- Red, Realms of Fantasy (April 2007)
- To the Core, Dreams & Desires Vol. 1 (Freya's Bower, February 2007)
- Hell's Belles, (Kensington/Zebra Books, January 2007 – trade paperback)
- Why Monsters Don’t Do Group Therapy, From the Asylum (December 2006)
- The Ties That Bind, Farthing (Spring 2006)
- Giving the Devil His To-Do’s, From the Asylum (December 2005)
- Reflections, ** Ruthie's Club (November 2005)
- Hunger, Byzarium (September 2005)
- The Compromise, Wild Child Publishing (August 2005)
- Guilty Pleasures, Peridot Books*** (Winter 2005)

Honorary Mention, Year's Best Fantasy and Horror (October 2007) Under the byline J.M. Kaye Now called Allegory

==== Young adult fiction ====
- Very Superstitious (2013)
  - Anthology
- To Bear an Iron Key (2014)

Riders of the Apocalypse

- Hunger (October 2010)
- Rage (April 2011)
- Loss (2012)
- Breath (2013)

== See also ==
- List of romantic novelists
