= Caitlin Kittredge =

American author

- Born: September 1984 (age 41)
- Occupation: Writer
- Writing career
- Notable work: Nocturne City novels
- Website: www.caitlinkittredge.com

Caitlin Kittredge (born September 1984) is an American author and comic-book writer of dark fantasy and urban fantasy noir. She is known for her Nocturne City series of adult novels, and for The Iron Codex, a series of young adult books. She has also written the comic books Coffin Hill for Vertigo Comics and Witchblade and Throwaways for Image Comics.

== Personal life ==
Caitlin Kittredge graduated from college with a degree in English. She has cited Raymond Chandler, Neil Gaiman, and H.P. Lovecraft as inspirations. Kittredge is a fan of film noir, classic pulp novels, and comic books. She describes herself as "a skeptical believer in the Something Else. There's too much strange in this world for me to totally discount the possibility of Something Else being out there. But at the same time, I'm the first person to try and debunk any supernatural stuff that people claim is going on around them. I, personally, had one completely terrifying encounter with something supernatural that I still can't explain...hence my lack of 100% skepticism."

== Career ==
=== Adult fiction ===
Kittredge's Nocturne City is a series of adult urban fantasy novels. The story follows Luna Wilder, a young police officer who lives in a city inhabited by both normal humans and paranormal beings. Being a werewolf herself, Luna has ties to both sides of her society.

=== Young-adult fiction ===
Kittredge's debut young-adult novel, The Iron Thorn, was released in February 2011. It is the first novel in the Iron Codex series, an alternate-history steampunk story set in a Victorian-themed America. The novel's main setting, Lovecraft, was named after author H.P. Lovecraft. The book follows a girl named Aoife, who embarks on a journey to save herself from a hereditary madness, and ends up on a paranormal adventure alongside two allies. A review from Booklist applauded the novel's romance and plot twists, and stated that "Kittredge's richly descriptive narrative captures all the details of clockwork, inventive machinery, foggy mists, ghastly ghouls, and creative landscapes." The review also called Aoife "a caustic-tongued, feisty, and independent young woman, with plenty of nerve and courage." A review from Publishers Weekly stated, "Though the material borrowed from H.P. Lovecraft occasionally calls too much attention to itself, Kittredge generates significant thrills and chills in this fast-moving tale".

=== Comic books ===
Kittredge began writing a monthly comic-book series for Vertigo Comics titled Coffin Hill in October 2013. She is also the writer of the ongoing series Throwaways, which began in July 2016 and a revamp of Witchblade, which began in December 2017, both for Image Comics.

== Bibliography ==
=== Novels ===
==== Nocturne City ====
1. Night Life (March 2008)
2. Pure Blood (August 2008)
3. Second Skin (March 2009)
4. Witch Craft (September 2009)
5. Daemon's Mark (May 2010)

==== Black London ====
1. Street Magic (June 2009)
2. Demon Bound (December 2009)
3. Bone Gods (November 2010)
4. Devil's Business (2011)
5. Soul Trade (2012)
6. Dark Days (2013)

==== Icarus Project ====
1. Black & White (2009), with Jackie Kessler
2. Shades of Gray (2010), with Jackie Kessler

==== Iron Codex ====
1. The Iron Thorn (February 2011)
2. The Nightmare Garden (February 2012)
3. The Mirrored Shard (February 2013)

==== Hellhound Chronicles ====
1. Black Dog (October 2014)
2. Grim Tidings (August 2015)

=== Short stories ===
- "Ginger: A Nocturne City Story", in Strange Brew
- "Newlydeads" (Black London), in My Big Fat Supernatural Honeymoon
- "Perdition", in Love Bites
- "The Devil Went Down to Boston", in Games Creatures Play
- "Down in the Ground Where the Dead Men Go" in Huntress (2009)

=== Vertigo ===
Coffin Hill #1-ongoing (with Inaki Miranda, 2013-...)

=== Image ===
Throwaways #1-ongoing (with Steven Sanders, 2016-...)

Witchblade #1-ongoing (with Roberta Ingranata and Bryan Vanelza, 2017-...)
