= Hunger (Kessler novel) =

2010 novel by Jackie Morse Kessler

- Author: Jackie Morse Kessler
- Cover artist: Sammy Yuen
- Language: English
- Series: Riders of the Apocalypse
- Genre: Young adult fiction, Fantasy
- Publisher: Houghton Mifflin Harcourt
- Publication date: October 2010
- Publication place: United States
- Media type: print
- Pages: 177
- ISBN: 978-0-547-34124-8
- LC Class: PZ7.K4835Hu 2010
- Followed by: Rage

Hunger is a 2010 young adult novel by Jackie Morse Kessler.

== Plot ==
An anorexic teenage girl is given the duties of Famine, of the Four Horsemen of the Apocalypse.

== Reception ==
Kirkus Reviews said, the author's "ear for dialogue, fluid prose and dark humor elevate this brief novel above other 'issue books'". Library Media Connection said that the author's "experience with bulimia brings realism to the topic", and that "the mix of fantasy and action makes this short novel... compelling reading, especially for reluctant readers". Jenny of Wondrous Reads found it "...brilliant."

== See also ==
- Eating disorder
