= Black and White (novel) =

2009 novel by Jackie Kessler and Caitlin Kittredge

- First edition Cover artist: Juda Tverski
- Author: Jackie Kessler, Caitlin Kittredge
- Language: English
- Publication date: 2009

Black and White is a 2009 superhero novel written by Jackie Kessler and Caitlin Kittredge and published by Spectra Trade Paperbacks. It is the first book in the Icarus Project series. The second book, Shades of Gray, was released in June 2010.

== Plot ==
Iridium and Jet are two new students starting their first year at the academy. Later on, they are assigned as partners. During their final exam, Iridium comes across a rapist attacking a prostitute. Iridium interrupts, letting the prostitute escape, and is attacked by the rapist, whom she kills. It is decided that Iridium will be sent to therapy. Jet makes a deal, having Iridium sent to Blackbird Penitentiary instead. Just before the transfer, Iridium disappears, working toward her own goals in a section of New Chicago called Wrecked City. Jet graduates, becoming the official superhero of New Chicago.

Five years later, Iridium and Jet reconnect. Night contacts Jet and asks her to look for Lynda Kidder. Meanwhile, Iridium partners with a vigilante named Taser to take down the Ops computer system.

Iridium and Taser enter the underground to find access to the building where the blueprints of The Academy would be kept. The pair come across Jet fighting Lynda Kidder, who has been turned into a heavily muscled monster. After defeating Lynda, Jet attacks Iridium, believing that she was involved in what had happened to Kidder. Iridium knocks out Jet and gets away. Jet's injuries are healed, but she is forced to spend two weeks having bed rest.

Iridium and Taser head up to the Academy, shut down Ops and destroy the computer. When they finish, Taser knocks out Iridium. Taser then heads to Jet's apartment and sedates her.

Jet wakes up next to Iridium. The two argue a moment before finally starting to talk and begin patching things up between them again. Taser reveals that he is a mercenary who was hired to get close to them both. It is further revealed that he is Bruce Hunter, a man both of them have dated. Taser's employer is revealed to be Night, who had been planning to have Jet blanket the world in darkness. Taser overhears the plan and defeats Night. After this, the three go their separate ways.

== Reception ==
A Publishers Weekly review states, "Both characters are intriguingly flawed: Jet suffers from insecurity, while Iridium's arrogance repeatedly gets her into trouble" and "Jet and Iridium's multifaceted relationship will appeal to all who have come to want more from their superheroes than good vs. evil and mindless battles." In The Daily Telegraph, Peter Ingham reviews Black and White, writing that the book "makes up for a lack of originality with the jaunty pace of a graphic novel and reads with the same easy fluency. Highly entertaining." In Analog Science Fiction & Fact, Don Sakers reviews Black and White and Shades of Gray, writing, "Jet and Iridium are engaging characters and their world is intriguing."
