= Rage (Kessler novel) =

2011 novel by Jackie Morse Kessler

- Author: Jackie Morse Kessler
- Cover artist: Sammy Yuen
- Language: English
- Series: Riders of the Apocalypse
- Genre: Young adult fiction, Fantasy
- Publisher: Houghton Mifflin Harcourt
- Publication date: April 2011
- Publication place: United States
- Media type: print
- ISBN: 978-0-547-44528-1
- Preceded by: Hunger
- Followed by: Loss

Rage is a 2011 young adult novel by Jackie Morse Kessler and the second book in the Riders of the Apocalypse series.

== Plot ==
A teenage girl who cuts herself must take on the role of War, one of the Four Horsemen of the Apocalypse.

== Reception ==
Critical reception for Rage was mixed, with Kirkus Reviews praising the portrayals of the other horsemen and their steeds but saying "the psychological and social issues overwhelm the paranormal elements here, and the theme of overcoming self-harm through apocalyptic power wears thin on this second outing. Dark humor and realistic situations cannot overcome the swiftly staling premise." A reviewer for School Library Journal said, "[I] had trouble reading about the cutting, but eventually I was able to warm up to the story". VOYA reviewed the book and stated that the book would "capture readers with its haunting scenes and engaging characters".

In her criticism of violence within contemporary young adult fiction, Meghan Cox Gurdon cites Rage as an example of literature that may "help normalize" pathology and "even spread their plausibility and likelihood to young people who might otherwise never have imagined such extreme measures". Kessler refuted this idea in her blog, saying, "The entire purpose of the book—indeed, of all of the Riders of the Apocalypse books—is to raise awareness of issues such as self-injury and eating disorders and bullying."
