= Strange Brew (book) =

- First edition
- Author: P.N. Elrod
- Cover artist: Bruce Emmett
- Genre: Urban fantasy
- Publisher: St. Martin's Griffin
- Publication date: July 2009
- Publication place: United States
- Media type: Print, paperback
- Pages: 372
- ISBN: 978-0-312-38336-7
- OCLC: 294887379
- Dewey Decimal: 813'.0876608 dc22
- LC Class: PS648.O33S77 2009

Strange Brew is an urban fantasy short story anthology, edited by P.N. Elrod.

== Stories ==
1. "Seeing Eye", by Patricia Briggs
2. "Last Call", by Jim Butcher
3. "Death Warmed Over", by Rachel Caine
4. "Vegas Odds", by Karen Chance
5. "Hecate's Golden Eye", by P.N. Elrod
6. "Bacon", by Charlaine Harris
7. "Signatures of the Dead", by Faith Hunter
8. "Ginger: A Nocturne City Story", by Caitlin Kittredge
9. "Dark Sins", by Jenna Maclaine

== Reviews ==
Rich Horton, in Fantasy Magazine, says, "Some of these stories seem rushed or rudimentary. Some lean a shade too much on a presumption of familiarity with the novels featuring the stories’ characters." He continues, "But there is a fair amount of enjoyable fiction here as well."

BSCreview reviewer, amberdrake [sic], says, "For the most part, this anthology was highly entertaining", and "definitely worth picking up, especially if you like stories about witches or if some of these authors are your favorites".

Strange Brew won Honorable Mention in the Pearl Award for best anthology, 2009.
