= Rachel Caine =

American author (1962–2020)

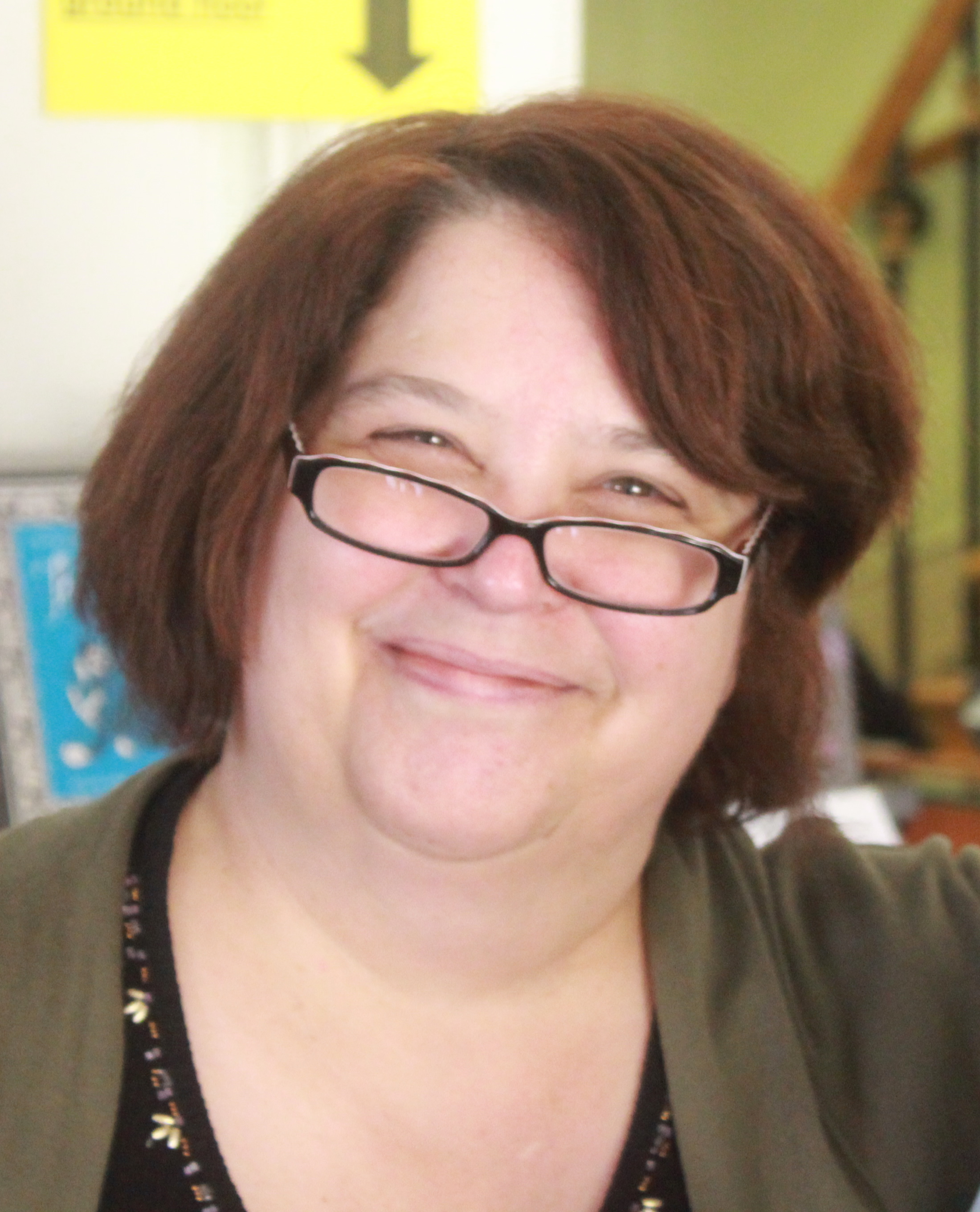
- Caine in 2012
- Born: April 27, 1962; United States
- Died: November 1, 2020 (aged 58)
- Occupation: Writer
- Writing career
- Pen name: Rachel Caine; Julie Fortune
- Genres: Fantasy, suspense, mystery, science fiction, romance, young adult
- Website: rachelcaine.com

Roxanne Longstreet Conrad (April 27, 1962 – November 1, 2020), known by her pen name Rachel Caine, was an American writer of science fiction, fantasy, mystery, suspense, and horror novels.

== Personal life ==
Caine grew up in West Texas and graduated from Socorro High School in El Paso, Texas, in 1980. She earned a bachelor's degree in accounting from the Rawls College of Business at Texas Tech University in 1985, with a minor in music. Caine wrote and published novels and short stories starting in 1990. She was a professional musician who played with notable musicians including Henry Mancini, Peter Nero, and John Williams.

From 1999, Caine was employed in corporate communications as a web designer, editor, corporate communications manager, and finally as director of corporate communications for a large multinational company. She took an eight-month hiatus for most of 2008 to meet pressing deadlines, and retired from her position to write full-time in 2010. She lived in north Texas with her husband, artist Cat Conrad. Caine did most of her writing at home and on the road during appearances.

In 2018, Caine was diagnosed with soft tissue sarcoma. She died on November 1, 2020.

She was awarded with the Kate Wilhem Solstice Award by the SFWA in 2020, the citation saying “Rachel Caine was a prolific and wonderful writer, but also dedicated herself to using her platform to lift up others. From mentoring to fundraising efforts, Rachel was always there for the community.”

== Bibliography ==
=== As Rachel Caine ===
==== Standalone novels ====
Young Adult
Title	Also In	Date Published	Publisher	ISBN	Comments
Prince of Shadows		Feb 4, 2014	NAL	ISBN 978-0451414427	A retelling of Romeo and Juliet from Benvolio Montague's point of view.

Adult
Title	Also In	Date Published	Publisher	ISBN	Comments
Carniepunk: The Cold Girl	Carniepunk	2013			
Dogsbody		2013			
Marion, Missing	Dark Secrets: A Paranormal Noir Anthology	2016			

==== Weather Warden (adult urban fantasy) ====
Joanne Baldwin is a Weather Warden and part of an organization that rents space from the UN. Their mission is supposed to be alleviating natural disasters before millions of people die. Joanne shows up on the run, in her hot Mustang "Delilah", from a murder of which she has been accused; she thinks if she can find Lewis Orwell, with all three Warden capabilities—Earth, Fire, and Weather—who is in hiding, she can get help. Lewis' last known action among the Wardens was to steal three bottles containing Djinn, the supernatural beings, many of whom partner with Wardens to do their work. Her life becomes one huge complication as she learns a lot of truths people do not want her to know.

#	Title	Also In	Date Published	Publisher	ISBN	Comments
1	Ill Wind	Weather Warden Series Rachel Caine 8 Books Collection Set	Dec 2003	Roc Books	ISBN 0-451-45952-0	
2	Heat Stroke	Weather Warden Series Rachel Caine 8 Books Collection Set	Aug 2004	Roc Books	ISBN 0-451-45984-9	
3	Chill Factor	Weather Warden Series Rachel Caine 8 Books Collection Set	Jan 2005	Roc Books	ISBN 0-451-46010-3	
4	Windfall	Weather Warden Series Rachel Caine 8 Books Collection Set	Nov 2005	Roc Books	ISBN 0-451-46057-X	
5	Firestorm	Weather Warden Series Rachel Caine 8 Books Collection Set	Sep 2006	Roc Books	ISBN 0-451-46104-5	
6	Thin Air	Weather Warden Series Rachel Caine 8 Books Collection Set	Aug 2007	Roc Books	ISBN 0-451-46163-0	
7	Gale Force	Weather Warden Series Rachel Caine 8 Books Collection Set	Aug 2008	Roc Books	ISBN 0-451-46223-8	
8	Cape Storm	Weather Warden Series Rachel Caine 8 Books Collection Set	Aug 2009	Roc Books	ISBN 0-451-46163-0	
9	Total Eclipse		Aug 2010	Roc Books	ISBN 0-451-46345-5	
	Shiny	Chicks Kick Butt	2011			
10	Red Hot Rain					Funded in 2015 via a Kickstarter campaign, now cancelled due to health issues and her death

==== Red Letter Days (Adult Urban Fantasy) ====
#	Title	Also In	Date Published	Publisher	ISBN
1	Devil's Bargain		Aug 2005	Silhouette Bombshell	ISBN 0-373-51367-4
2	Devil's Due		Jan 2006	Silhouette Bombshell	ISBN 0-373-51387-9

==== The Morganville Vampires (Young Adult) ====
#	Extras #	Title	Also In	Date Published	Publisher	ISBN
0.1	1	Myrnin's Tale	Midnight Bites	2012		
0.2	1.5	Viper and the Farmer	Midnight Bites	2015		
0.5	6	The First Day of the Rest of Your Life	Midnight Bites Many Bloody Returns	2007		
1		Glass Houses	The Morganville Vampires, Volume 1 The Morganville Vampires, #1-3 The Morganville Vampires Collection #1-4 The Morganville Vampires, #1-8 The Morganville Vampires, #1-9 The Morganville Vampires, #1-11 The Morganville Vampires, #1-12 The Morganville Vampires Collection, #1-15	Oct 2006	NAL Jam	ISBN 0-451-21994-5
1.4	5.5	Eve's Diary	Midnight Bites			
1.5	7	Amelie's story	Midnight Bites	2010		
2		The Dead Girls' Dance	The Morganville Vampires, Volume 1 The Morganville Vampires, #1-3 The Morganville Vampires Collection #1-4 The Morganville Vampires, #1-8 The Morganville Vampires, #1-9 The Morganville Vampires, #1-11 The Morganville Vampires, #1-12 The Morganville Vampires Collection, #1-15	Apr 2007	NAL Jam	ISBN 0-451-22089-7
2.5	4	Grudge	Midnight Bites	2012		
3		Midnight Alley	The Morganville Vampires, Volume 2 The Morganville Vampires, #1-3 The Morganville Vampires Collection #1-4 The Morganville Vampires, #1-8 The Morganville Vampires, #1-9 The Morganville Vampires, #1-11 The Morganville Vampires, #1-12 The Morganville Vampires Collection, #1-15	Oct 2007	NAL Jam	ISBN 0-451-22238-5
4		Feast of Fools	The Morganville Vampires, Volume 2 The Morganville Vampires, #4-6 The Morganville Vampires Collection #1-4 The Morganville Vampires, #1-8 The Morganville Vampires, #1-9 The Morganville Vampires, #1-11 The Morganville Vampires, #1-12 The Morganville Vampires Collection, #1-15	Jun 2008	NAL Jam	ISBN 0-451-22463-9
4.5	9	Dead Man Stalking	Midnight Bites Vampires: The Recent Undead	2010		
5		Lord of Misrule	The Morganville Vampires, Volume 3 The Morganville Vampires, #4-6 The Morganville Vampires, #1-8 The Morganville Vampires, #1-9 The Morganville Vampires, #1-11 The Morganville Vampires, #1-12 The Morganville Vampires Collection, #1-15	Jan 2009	NAL Jam	ISBN 0-451-22572-4
6		Carpe Corpus	The Morganville Vampires, Volume 3 The Morganville Vampires, #4-6 The Morganville Vampires, #1-8 The Morganville Vampires, #1-9 The Morganville Vampires, #1-11 The Morganville Vampires, #1-12 The Morganville Vampires Collection, #1-15	Jun 2009	NAL Jam	ISBN 0-451-22719-0
6.5	12	Murdered Out	Midnight Bites	2013		
6.6	11	All Hallows	Midnight Bites	2009		
7		Fade Out	The Morganville Vampires, Volume 4 The Morganville Vampires, #1-8 The Morganville Vampires, #1-9 The Morganville Vampires, #1-11 The Morganville Vampires, #1-12 The Morganville Vampires Collection, #1-15	Nov 2009	NAL Jam	ISBN 0-451-22866-9
7.5	13	Worth Living For	Midnight Bites			
8		Kiss of Death	The Morganville Vampires, Volume 4 The Morganville Vampires, #1-8 The Morganville Vampires, #1-9 The Morganville Vampires, #1-11 The Morganville Vampires, #1-12 The Morganville Vampires Collection, #1-15	Apr 27, 2010	NAL Jam	ISBN 0-451-22973-8
9		Ghost Town	The Morganville Vampires, #1-9 The Morganville Vampires, #1-11 The Morganville Vampires, #1-12 The Morganville Vampires Collection, #1-15	Oct 26, 2010	NAL Hardcover	ISBN 0-451-23161-9
9.1	3	Sam's Story	Midnight Bites	2010		
10		Bite Club	The Morganville Vampires, #1-11 The Morganville Vampires, #1-12 The Morganville Vampires Collection, #1-15	May 3, 2011	NAL Hardcover	ISBN 0-451-23318-2
10.1	8	Wrong Place, Wrong Time	Midnight Bites	2010		
10.2	15	Vexed	Midnight Bites			
10.5	17	Anger Management	Midnight Bites	2013		
10.6	18	Automatic	Midnight Bites	2011		
11		Last Breath	The Morganville Vampires, #1-11 The Morganville Vampires, #1-12 The Morganville Vampires Collection, #1-15	Nov 1, 2011	NAL Hardcover	ISBN 978-0-749-04055-0
12		Black Dawn	The Morganville Vampires, #1-12 The Morganville Vampires Collection, #1-15	May 1, 2012	NAL Hardcover	ISBN 978-0-749-04055-0
12.3	16	Signs and Miracles	Midnight Bites			
12.5	19	Dark Rides	Midnight Bites	2012		
13		Bitter Blood	The Morganville Vampires Collection, #1-15	Nov 6, 2012	NAL Hardcover	ISBN 978-0-451-23811-5
13.5	10	Lunch Date	Midnight Bites	2010		
14		Fall of Night	The Morganville Vampires Collection, #1-15 Midnight Bites	May 7, 2013	NAL Hardcover	ISBN 978-0-451-41425-0
15	21	Daylighters	The Morganville Vampires Collection, #1-15 Midnight Bites	Nov 5, 2013	NAL Hardcover	ISBN 0-451-41427-6
15.1	22.5	Your Mileage May Vary	Midnight Bites	2015		
15.6	20	Pitch-Black Blues	Midnight Bites			
	22	And One for the Devil	Midnight Bites			
	12.5	Let Them Eat Cake	Midnight Bites			
	14	Drama Queen's Last Dance	Midnight Bites			
		Claire's Blog				

==== Athena Force (Adult Urban Fantasy) ====
#	Title	Also In	Date Published	Publisher	ISBN
18	Line of Sight		Aug 2007	Silhouette Special Releases	ISBN 0-373-38972-8

==== The Outcast Season (Adult Urban Fantasy) ====
On August 24, 2007, Caine announced on her mailing list and her blog that she had sold a four-book series called "Outcast Season" to Roc Books. Describing the upcoming series, she said "This series is a spin-off of the Weather Warden series, and will follow the story of a Djinn who's been cut off from her fellows, and must rely on the goodwill of a Warden partner for her very existence. Along the way, she has to face enemies and challenges that the Djinn can't, or won't face themselves." The series was published yearly in February since 2009.

#	Title	Also In	Date Published	Publisher	ISBN
1	Undone		Feb 3, 2009	Roc Books	ISBN 0-451-46261-0
2	Unknown		Feb 3, 2010	Roc Books	ISBN 0-451-46309-9
3	Unseen		Feb 1, 2011	Roc Books	ISBN 0-451-46383-8
3.5	Running Wild	Those Who Fight Monsters: Tales of Occult Detectives	2011		
4	Unbroken		Feb 7, 2012	Roc Books	ISBN 0-451-46442-7

==== The Revivalist (Adult Urban Fantasy) ====
#	Title	Also In	Date Published	Publisher	ISBN	Comments
1	Working Stiff		Aug 2, 2011	Roc	ISBN 0-451-46413-3	paperback, 320pp
2	Two Weeks' Notice		Aug 7, 2012	Roc	ISBN 0-451-46462-1	paperback, 320pp
3	Terminated		Aug 6, 2013	Roc	ISBN 0-451-46515-6	paperback, 320pp

==== The Great Library (Young Adult) ====
#	Title	Also In	Date Published	Publisher	ISBN	Comments
0.1	Tigers in the Cage		2016			
0.5	Stormcrow		2016			
1	Ink and Bone		Jul 7, 2015	NAL	ISBN 0-451-47239-X	hardcover, 368pp
2	Paper and Fire		Jul 2016	NAL	ISBN 0-451-47240-3	hardcover, 354pp
3	Ash and Quill		Jul 2017	Berkley	ISBN 978-0451472410	hardcover, 368pp
4	Smoke and Iron		Jul 2018	Berkley	ISBN 0451489217	hardcover 368pp
5	Sword and Pen		Sep 2019	Berkley	ISBN 0451489268	paperback 368pp

==== Stillhouse Lake ====
In 2017, Caine began publication of an intense new thriller series about Gwen Proctor, the ex-wife of an infamous serial killer who is constantly on guard for her kids against Internet trolls and real-life stalkers. When a body turns up in the lake outside their front door, and it appears to be connected to her ex-husband's methods, the spotlight's now on Gwen and her kids ... and she might never escape it again. 'Stillhouse Lake' is one of five finalists for the IATWA Thriller Awards 2018.

#	Title	Also In	Date Published	Publisher	ISBN
1	Stillhouse Lake		Jul 1, 2017	Thomas & Mercer	ISBN 978-1477848661
2	Killman Creek		Dec 12, 2017	Thomas & Mercer	ISBN 978-1542046411
3	Wolfhunter River		Apr 23, 2019	Thomas & Mercer	ISBN 978-1503902305
4	Bitter Falls		Jan 21, 2020	Amazon Publishing	ISBN 978-1542042338
5	Heartbreak Bay		Mar 9, 2021	Amazon Publishing	ISBN 978-1542093675
6	Trapper Road		Jul 30, 2022	Amazon Publishing	ISBN 979-8218045777

==== The Honors ====
Co-authored by Ann Aguirre.

#	Title	Also In	Date Published	Publisher	ISBN
1	Honor Among Thieves		Feb 13, 2018	Katherine Tegen Books	ISBN 978-0062570994
2	Honor Bound		Feb 19, 2019	Katherine Tegen Books	ISBN 978-0062571021
3	Honor Lost		Feb 11, 2020	Katherine Tegen Books	ISBN 978-0062571052

==== Short stories ====
Title	Published In	Date Published	Comments
All Hallows	The Eternal Kiss 13 Vampire Tales of Blood and Desire	2009	
Automatic	Enthralled: Paranormal Diversions	2011	
Blue Crush: A Weather Warden Story	The Mammoth Book of Paranormal Romance	2009	
Broken	Aliens: Bug Hunt	2017	
By the Light of the Silvery Moon	Naughty or Nice: A Holiday Anthology	2015	
The Cold Girl	Carniepunk	2013	
The Dark Downstairs	Dracula in London	2001	as Roxanne Longstreet Conrad
Dark Witness	Dark Duets	2014	
Dead Man's Chest	My Big Fat Supernatural Wedding	2009	
Dead Man Stalking: A Morganville Vampires Story	Immortal: Love Stories with Bite	2009	
Death Warmed Over	Strange Brew	2009	
Dogsbody	Shards and Ashes	2013	
Even a Rabbit will Bite	Dark and Stormy Knights	2010	
Faith Like Wine	The Time of the Vampires	2004	
Figures	Unfettered II: New Tales By Masters of Fantasy	2016	
The First Day of the Rest of Your Life	Many Bloody Returns	2007	
The Flower Song	Ripple Effect: A Collection of Fiction and Art	2008	
Forked Tongues	Kicking It	2013	
Great Race	The Gods of H.P. Lovecraft	2015	
Holly's Balm	Hex Appeal	2012	
Home: A Morganville Vampires Story	Hex Life	2019	
Madwalls	Unbound: Tales by Masters of Fantasy	2015	
Marion, Missing	Dark Secrets: A Paranormal Noir Anthology	2015	
Nobody's Business	Dead But Not Forgotten	2014	
Roman Holiday, or SPQ-Arrrrrr	My Big Fat Supernatural Honeymoon	2007	
Running Wild	Those Who Fight Monsters: Tales of Occult Detectives	2011	an Outcast Season story
Russian Roulette	The Mammoth Book of Special Ops Romance	2010	
Shiny	Chicks Kick Butt	2011	
Stealing Fire	Kolchak the Night Stalker Casebook	2015	
A Tiger in the Night	Hardboiled Horror	2017	
Voice of Experience	X-Files Vol. 2: The Truth Is Out There	2016	

=== As Roxanne Longstreet ===
Title	Also In	Date Published	Publisher	ISBN	Comments
Stormriders: A Shadow World Novel		Sep 1990	Iron Crown Enterprises	ISBN 1-55806-138-X	Paperback, 300pp
The Undead		Feb 1993	Zebra	ISBN 0-8217-4068-7	Paperback
Red Angel		Apr 1994	Zebra	ISBN 0-8217-4532-8	Paperback, 352pp
Cold Kiss		Jan 1995	Zebra	ISBN 0-8217-4812-2	Paperback, 256pp
Slow Burn		Mar 1996	Pinnacle	ISBN 0-7860-0241-7	Paperback

=== As Roxanne Conrad ===
Title	Also In	Date Published	Publisher	ISBN	Comments
Copper Moon		Jul 1997	Onyx	ISBN 0-451-19164-1	Paperback, 352pp
Bridge of Shadows		Nov 1998	Onyx	ISBN 0-451-19166-8	Paperback, 352pp
Exile, Texas		Nov 2003	Five Star Mystery	ISBN 1-59414-071-5	Hardcover, 304pp

==== Stargate SG-1 ====
Title	Also In	Date Published	Publisher	ISBN	Comments
Stepping Through the Stargate		2004			by Roxanne Conrad

=== As Ian Hammel ===
Title	Also In	Date Published	Publisher	ISBN	Comments
Stormriders		Feb 1996	Ace	ISBN 0-441-00302-8	reprint; Paperback, 312pp

=== As Julie Fortune ===
Title	Also In	Date Published	Publisher	ISBN
Sacrifice Moon (Stargate SG-1)		September 2004 (UK) July 2006 (US)	Fandemonium	ISBN 0-9547343-1-9

=== Anthologies and collections ===
Anthology or Collection	Contents	Publication Date	Publisher	ISBN	Editor
Dracula in London	The Dark Downstairs	2001			
The Time of the Vampires	Faith Like Wine	2004			
My Big Fat Supernatural Honeymoon	Roman Holiday, or SPQ-Arrrrrr	2007	St. Martin's Brillliance Audio Audible Studios	ISBN 0312375042, 9780312375041	P. N. Elrod
Many Bloody Returns	The First Day of the Rest of Your Life	2007			Charlaine Harris Toni L.P. Kelner
Ripple Effect: A Collection of Fiction and Art	The Flower Song	2008			
The Eternal Kiss 13 Vampire Tales of Blood and Desire	All Hallows	2009	Running Press Random House Brillliance Audio Kindle Audible Studios	ISBN 0762437170, 9780762437177	Trisha Telep
The Mammoth Book of Paranormal Romance	Blue Crush: A Weather Warden Story	2009	Running Press Robinson	ISBN 0762436514, 9780762436514	Trisha Telep
My Big Fat Supernatural Wedding	Dead Man's Chest	2009			
Immortal: Love Stories with Bite	Dead Man Stalking: A Morganville Vampires Story	2009			
Strange Brew	Death Warmed Over	2009	Brillliance Audio Audible Studios	ISBN 9781441834614, 1441834613	P. N. Elrod
The Morganville Vampires, Volume 1	Glass Houses The Dead Girl's Dance	2009			
Dark and Stormy Knights	Even a Rabbit will Bite	2010	St. Martin's Kindle Brillliance Audio Audible Studios	ISBN 0312598343, 9780312598341	P. N. Elrod
The Mammoth Book of Special Ops Romance	Russian Roulette	2010			
The Morganville Vampires, Volume 2	Midnight Alley Feast of Fools	2010			
The Morganville Vampires, Volume 3	Lord of Misrule Carpe Corpus	2010			
The Morganville Vampires Books 1-8	Glass Houses The Dead Girl's Dance Midnight Alley Feast of Fools Lord of Misrule Carpe Corpus Fade Out Kiss of Death	2010	Signet	ISBN 9781101496985, 9781101497043	Rachel Caine
Eternal: More Love Stories with Bite	Drama Queen's Last Dance	2010			P.C. Cast
The Morganville Vampires, #1-3	Glass Houses The Dead Girl's Dance Midnight Alley	2010			
Weather Warden Series Rachel Caine 8 Books Collection Set	Set Gale Force Thin Air Firestorm Chill Factor Cape Strom Total Eclipse Heat Stroke Windfall	2010?			
The Morganville Vampires, #1-9	Glass Houses The Dead Girl's Dance Midnight Alley Feast of Fools Lord of Misrule Carpe Corpus Fade Out Kiss of Death Last Breath	2011			
Enthralled: Paranormal Diversions	Automatic	2011	Harper	ISBN 9780062015792, 0062015796	Melissa Marr Kelley Armstrong
Those Who Fight Monsters: Tales of Occult Detectives	Running Wild	2011			
Chicks Kick Butt	Introduction Shiny	2011	Tor Books Brillliance Audio	ISBN 9780765325778, 9780765364760	Rachel Caine Kerrie L. Hughes
Vampires: The Recent Undead	Dead Man Stalking	2011			Paula Guran
The Morganville Vampires, Volume 4	Fade Out Kiss of Death	2011			
The Morganville Vampires, #1-11	Glass Houses The Dead Girl's Dance Midnight Alley Feast of Fools Lord of Misrule Carpe Corpus Fade Out Kiss of Death Last Breath Ghost Town Bite Club	2011			
The Morganville Vampires, #4-6	Feast of Fools Lord of Misrule Carpe Corpus	2011			
Hex Appeal	Holly's Balm	2012			
The Morganville Vampires, #1-12	Glass Houses The Dead Girl's Dance Midnight Alley Feast of Fools Lord of Misrule Carpe Corpus Fade Out Kiss of Death Last Breath Ghost Town Bite Club Black Dawn	2012?			
Shards and Ashes	Dogsbody	2013			Melissa Marr Kelley Armstrong
Kicking It	Forked Tongues	2013	Roc	ISBN 9780451419002	Faith Hunter Kalayna Price
The Morganville Vampires Collection #1-4	Glass Houses The Dead Girl's Dance Midnight Alley Feast of Fools	2013			
The Morganville Vampires Collection, #1-15	Glass Houses The Dead Girl's Dance Midnight Alley Feast of Fools Lord of Misrule Carpe Corpus Fade Out Kiss of Death Last Breath Ghost Town Bite Club Black Dawn Bitter Blood Fall of Night Daylighters	2013?			
Carniepunk	The Cold Girl	2013	Gallery Books	ISBN 9781476714158	Rachel Caine
Dark Duets	Dark Witness	2014			
Dead But Not Forgotten	Nobody's Business	2014	Brillliance Audio	ISBN 9781491507124, 1491507128	Charlaine Harris Toni L.P. Kelner
Naughty or Nice: A Holiday Anthology	By the Light of the Silvery Moon	2015			
The Gods of H.P. Lovecraft	Great Race	2015			
Unbound: Tales by Masters of Fantasy	Madwalls	2015			
Dark Secrets: A Paranormal Noir Anthology	Marion, Missing	2015			
Kolchak the Night Stalker Casebook	Stealing Fire	2015			
Unfettered II: New Tales By Masters of Fantasy	Figures	2016			
X-Files Vol. 2: The Truth Is Out There	Voice of Experience	2016			
Midnight Bites	See Extras in Morganville Vampires section.	2016	Penguin	ISBN 9781101989784	Rachel Caine
Aliens: Bug Hunt	Broken	2017			
Hardboiled Horror	A Tiger in the Night	2017			
Dead Air: The Complete Season 1		2018			Gwenda Bond Carrie Ryan
Hex Life	Home: A Morganville Vampires Story	2019			
