= Grave Sight =

2005 novel by Charlaine Harris

- Cover of Grave Sight
- Author: Charlaine Harris
- Language: English
- Series: Harper Connelly Mysteries
- Genre: Mystery, Fantasy
- Publisher: Berkley
- Publication date: October 4, 2005
- Publication place: United States
- Media type: Print (Hardcover, Paperback) e-Book (Kindle); Audio Book (CD)
- Pages: 320 (Hardcover)
- ISBN: 0-425-20568-1
- OCLC: 52093965
- LC Class: CPB Box no. 2084 vol. 2
- Followed by: Grave Surprise

Grave Sight is the first of four novels in The Harper Connelly Mysteries by American mystery author Charlaine Harris. Harper Connelly, the central character of the novel, has the ability to sense the location and last memories of dead people, a result of being struck by lightning as a young teenager. In Grave Sight, Harper Connelly and her protective stepbrother, Tolliver Lang, help find the whereabouts and condition of a missing teenage girl in a small town in the Ozark mountains, only to encounter a complex network of lies and murders.

In 2011–2012, Grave Sight was adapted into graphic novel format by Dynamite Comics in three volumes. The script listed William Harms as co-writer and featured art by Denis Medri. The graphic novels were 64 pages long and sold for $7.99 each. The third volume contained an interview with Charlaine Harris as a bonus feature.
