= Harper Connelly Mysteries =

Series of fantasy mystery novels by Charlaine Harris

The Harper Connelly Mysteries is a series of fantasy mystery novels written by Charlaine Harris, and first published in 2005. Harris is known best for penning The Southern Vampire Mysteries (also referred to as the True Blood Series), a series rich in supernatural characters such as vampires, telepaths, werewolves, shapeshifters and fairies; she has also written more traditional (non-paranormal) mysteries. The Harper Connelly Mysteries is also centered on a character with supernatural abilities, however these abilities are more subtle than in The Southern Vampire Mysteries.

The series is narrated by 24-year-old Harper Connelly, who comes from a self-professed “riches to rags” family. Her mother married a man when Harper was a teenager, and she acquired a step-brother, Tolliver, in the process. They watched their parents succumb to drugs and their family life reduced to nothing. At 15, Harper was struck by lightning, a life-altering event that left her with the unique ability to sense dead people. When near a dead person, she can hear a “buzzing sound” that intensifies if the death is more recent. Along with this ability, she can see how the person died, but in the case of murders, not the identity of the murderer. Intent on making the most of her situation, Harper and Tolliver (who has taken on the role of her manager) charge customers who are in need of her special talent.

== The Harper Connelly Novels ==
1. Grave Sight (October 2005), ISBN 0-425-21289-0
2. Grave Surprise (October 2006), ISBN 978-0425212035
3. An Ice Cold Grave (October 2007), ISBN 978-0-4252-1729-0
4. Grave Secret (October 2009), ISBN 0-441-01830-0

== Characters ==
=== Main characters ===
Harper Connelly: The main character, Harper is 24 years old in the first novel of the series. As a result of being struck by lightning at the age of 15, Harper can find dead bodies by sensing a buzzing sound when they are near. In addition, she can see their cause of death.

Tolliver Lang: Tolliver is Harper’s stepbrother, and is 28 years old in the first novel of the series. Harper’s mother married Tolliver’s father when Harper was a teenager and they have relied on each other for strength ever since. After Harper acquired her unique ability to sense the dead, Tolliver became her manager and travels with her, booking appointments with customers. There is a certain degree of sexual tension between Tolliver and Harper, and they both must deal with their feelings for each other as well as their status as stepsiblings.

=== Recurring characters ===
- Cameron Connelly: Harper's older sister who went missing at the age of 18. Harper dreams of one day finding her, although she is almost certain that she is dead.
- Gracie : Harper and Tolliver's youngest sister.
- Hank Gorham: Harper's uncle by his marriage to Iona Gorham. He is the adopted father of Mariella and Gracie.
- Iona Gorham (née Howe): Harper's maternal aunt. She is the adopted mother of Mariella and Gracie, and married to Hank Gorham. In Grave Sight (book 1), Hank and Iona are described as Tolliver's biological aunt and uncle, not Harper's. This changes in book 2.
- Manfred Bernardo: A genuine psychic who appears in books 2–4 as a friend and colleague of Harper and Tolliver. He is the grandson of psychic Xylda Bernardo, and demonstrates a romantic interest in Harper. He plays a major role in the resolution of the storylines in An Ice Cold Grave, and Grave Secret.
- Mariella: Harper and Tolliver's younger sister. There seem to be some inconsistencies in age though. In book 1, It states that she had just turned eleven and had run off. In book 2, it states that she was nine.
- Mark Lang: Tolliver's older brother. He assumes a much larger role in the final book in the series, Grave Secret.
- Matthew Lang: Father to Mark, Tolliver, Mariella and Gracie Lang, and stepfather to Harper and Cameron Connelly. He was married to Harper's mother, Laurel Howe Connelly Lang.
- Xylda Bernardo: A psychic who appears in books 2–3 as a friend and colleague of Harper and Tolliver. She is the grandmother of Manfred Bernardo. Although she possesses genuine psychic ability, she is described as an "old fraud" due to sometimes unscrupulous, although never malicious, conduct.

== Television adaptation ==
CBS was developing a series based on the Harper Connelly Mysteries series with Ridley Scott and Tony Scott as executive producers. Charlaine Harris later stated that CBS had passed on the show and it would not be adapted.

In April 2012, Charlaine confirmed that SyFy was making a television adaption of the Harper Connelly Mysteries series.

Charlaine Harris reported on her facebook page that the "Harper Connelly series" was a 'no-go' and syfy had opted out.
