= P. N. Elrod =

American author and editor

- Born: Patricia Nead Elrod; 1954 (age 71–72)
- Occupations: Writer and editor
- Writing career
- Genres: Fantasy, horror, mystery, urban fantasy
- Subject: Vampires
- Website: www.facebook.com/p.n.elrod/

Patricia Nead Elrod (born 1954) is an American novelist specializing in urban fantasy. She has written in the mystery, romance, paranormal, and historical genres with at least one foray into comedic fantasy. Elrod is also an editor, having worked on several collections for Ace Science Fiction, DAW, Benbella Books, and St. Martin's Griffin. She self-published a signed, limited edition novel under her own imprint, Vampwriter Books.

In 2010, she was nominated for the RT Book Reviews Career Achievement Award in Urban Fantasy.

In 2011, she was presented with the RT Book Reviews Pioneer Achievement Award in Vampire Fiction.

Her suspense short story, Beach Girl, won the 2011 Ellery Queen's Mystery Magazine Readers Choice Award.

== Overview ==
P. N. Elrod's start in professional publishing began at TSR writing gaming modules. She has published more than twenty-five novels, beginning in 1990 with her Vampire Files urban fantasy series, featuring hard-boiled private investigator Jack Fleming and his partner, Charles Escott, girlfriend, Bobbi Smythe, and other recurring characters. The 12 books and counting are set in 1930s Chicago. Jack's first case was solving his own murder.

Next came the Jonathan Barrett, Gentleman Vampire series, set during the American Revolution. The twist on these historicals is that Barrett and his family are on the side of the British throughout the revolution, offering a unique point of view of the times.

Another series co-authored with actor Nigel Bennett, who played the evil yet seductive LaCroix on the television show Forever Knight, is of a very different character, but still features a good guy vampire. The three book Lord Richard, Vampire series from Baen Books are set in a different universe than the Files & Barrett books, but this "James Bond with fangs" maintains Elrod's premise that there are different breeds of vampires co-existing out there.

Using this premise, she has linked her universe to that of Bram Stoker with her sequel to Dracula, Quincey Morris, Vampire. Quincey was killed at the end of Dracula, but is resurrected as a vampire himself, albeit a different breed than the infamous count. Lord Richard makes a brief cameo appearance in the story, and Morris' vampiric state is attributed to a previous blood-sharing with Nora Jones from Elrod's Jonathan Barrett series.

Also, quite different, and qualifying as horror, are the Dungeons & Dragons-related books in the Ravenloft world featuring the dark and sinister vampire Count Strahd von Zarovich. These books, I, Strahd: Memoirs of a Vampire, and its sequel, I, Strahd: The War With Azalin, have garnered her critical acclaim from mainstream reviewers.

Elrod has authored around two dozen short stories in the fantasy, romance, science fiction, mystery, and horror genres, and edited several collections including Time of the Vampires, Dracula in London, and with Roxanne Conrad (aka Rachel Caine) Stepping Through the Stargate: The Science, Archaeology, and Military of Stargate SG-1 The latter is non-fiction and has contributions from world-famous scientists, doctors, the USAF military, FX wizards, and actors from the TV series.

In 2006, she edited an anthology of supernatural romance stories, My Big Fat Supernatural Wedding, which made the USA Today Bestseller list, and won the 2006 P.E.A.R.L. Awards for best anthology.

She followed it with My Big Fat Supernatural Honeymoon, released in January 2008 from St. Martin's Griffin. It made the New York Times Bestseller extended list and won an honorable mention in the 2007 Pearl Awards for best anthology.

Her collection Dark and Stormy Knights, also with St. Martin's Griffin, was released in July 2010. She also sold a steampunk series, On Her Majesty's Psychic Service, to Tor Books in 2010.

In April 2011, Elrod was presented with the RT Book Review's Pioneers of Genre Fiction Award for "Forging the Way in Vampire Fiction Since 1990."

Her short story, "Beach Girl", published in the November 2011 edition of Ellery Queen's Mystery Magazine, was presented with first place for their annual Readers' Choice Award.

Her collection, Hex Symbols, was released by St. Martin's in June 2012.

== Bibliography ==
=== Jonathan Barrett, Gentleman Vampire ===
1. Red Death (1993, 2004 re-release)
2. Death and the Maiden (1994, 2004 re-release)
3. Death Masque (1995, 2004 re-release)
4. Dance of Death (1996, 2004 re-release)

=== Ravenloft ===
- I, Strahd: The Memoirs of a Vampire (1993, ISBN 1-56076-670-0)

Abridged, three-hour audiobook from Random House, performed by Roddy McDowell

- I, Strahd: The War Against Azalin (1998, ISBN 0-7869-0754-1)

Both available as audiobooks, unabridged.

=== Vampire Files ===
#	Title	Also In	Publication Date	Comments
1	Bloodlist		1990	
2	Lifeblood		1990	
2.5	Vampires Prefer Blondes	Chicks Kick Butt	2011	
3	Bloodcircle		1990	
4	Art in the Blood		1991	
5	Fire in the Blood		1991	
6	Blood on the Water		1992	
7	Chill in the Blood		1998	Winner of the Lord Ruthven Award, best novel 1998
8	Dark Sleep		1999	
9	Lady Crymsyn		2000	
10	Cold Streets		2003	
11	Song in the Dark		2005	
11.4	Grave-robbed	Many Bloody Returns	2007	
11.5	Her Mother's Daughter	My Big Fat Supernatural Honeymoon	2009	
11.6	Hecate's Golden Eye	Strange Brew	2009	
12	Dark Road Rising		2009	
12.5	The Devil You Know		Apr 2009	Signed, limited-edition novella, Vampwriter Books
12.6	Dark Lady	Dark and Stormy Knights	2010	

=== Her Majesty's Psychic Service series ===
1. The Hanged Man

=== Other novels ===
- Quincey Morris, Vampire (Baen Books 2001, ISBN 0-671-31988-4); an expansion of the short story "The Wind Breathes Cold"
- The Adventures of Myhr (Baen Books 2003, ISBN 0-7434-3532-X)
- On Her Majesty's Psychic Service: The Hanged Man (Tor Books May, 2015 ISBN 978-0765329714)
- On Her Majesty's Psychic Service: The Chariot (Tor Books TBD)
- On Her Majesty's Psychic Service: The Empress (Tor Books TBD)

=== Co-writing with Nigel Bennett ===
- Keeper of the King (with Nigel Bennett) (Baen Books 1997, ISBN 0-671-87759-3)
- His Father's Son (with Nigel Bennett) (Baen Books 2001, ISBN 0-671-31981-7)
- Siege Perilous (with Nigel Bennett) (Baen Books 2004, ISBN 0-7434-8854-7)

=== Anthologies and collections ===
Anthology or Collection	Content	Publication Date	Editor	Publisher	Comments
Dracula, Prince of Darkness	The Wind Breathes Cold Caretaker	1992	Martin H. Greenberg	DAW	
Vampire Detectives	You'll Catch Your Death	1995	Martin H. Greenberg	DAW	Vampire Files story
Celebrity Vampires	A Night at the (Horse) Opera	1995	Martin H. Greenberg	DAW	
Women at War	Fugitives	1995	Lois McMaster Bujold Roland J. Green	Tor	
Time of the Vampires	The Witch's Mark	1996 2004	P.N. Elrod Martin H. Greenberg		
Mob Magic	The Quick Way Down	1998	Brian Thomsen Martin H. Greenberg	DAW	Vampire Files story
Dracula in London	Wolf and Hound	2001	P.N. Elrod Nigel Bennett		
Assassin Fantastic	Myhr's Adventure in Hell	2001	Martin H. Greenberg Alexander Potter	DAW	
Familiars	Dog Spelled Backwards	2002	Denise Little	DAW	
Creature Fantastic	The Tea Room Beasts	2002	Denise Little	DAW	
Vengeance Fantastic	The Astral Outrage	2002	Denise Little	DAW	
Death by Horoscope	Bossman	2002	Anne Perry John Helfers	Carroll & Graf	
Murder Most Romantic	The Scottish Ploy	2002	Denise Little		
White House Pet Detectives	Izzy's Shoe-In	2002	Carole Nelson Douglas	Cumberland House	
Kittens, Cats, and Crime	The Breath of Bast	Mar 2003	Ed Gorman	Five Star	Vampire Files story - Escott
Sorcerer's Academy	Silva's Dream Date	Sep 2003	Denise Little	DAW PB	
The Repentant	Slaughter	Oct 2003	Brian Thomsen Martin H. Greenberg	PB	Vampire Files story
Vampire Files Volume 1	Bloodlist Lifeblood Bloodcircle	2003			Vampire Files Books 1-3
Magic Shops	Tarnished Linings	Feb 2004	Denise Little	DAW PB	
Death by Dickens	Death in Dover	2004	Ann Perry		anthology
Rotten Relations	King of Shreds and Patches	2004	Denise Little	PB OOP	
Stepping Through the Stargate	Villains I Love to Hate	2004	P.N. Elrod Roxanne L. Conrad		
Farscape Forever!: Sex, Drugs and Killer Muppets	Farscape Villains I've Known and Loved	2005		BenBella Books	
All Hell Breaking Loose	The Name of the Game	2005		DAW	
Essay for Horror: Another 100 Best Books	The Night Stalker	Sep 2005	Kim Newman	Carroll & Graf	
Kolchak, the Night Stalker Chronicles	The Why of the Matter	Oct 2005		Moonstone Books	
My Big Fat Supernatural Wedding	All Shook Up	2006	P.N. Elrod		Winner of the 2006 Pearl Award for best paranormal anthology.
Vampire Files Volume 2	Art in the Blood Fire in the Blood Blood on the Water	2006			Vampire Files Books 4-6
The Kolchak Casebook	Power Hungry	Jan 2007		Moonstone Books	
Many Bloody Returns	Grave-robbed	2007		Ace Science Fiction	Vampire Files story
My Big Fat Supernatural Honeymoon	Her Mother's Daughter	2008	P.N. Elrod		Honorable Mention, 2007 Pearl Award, best paranormal anthology.
Strange Brew	Hecate's Golden Eye	Jul 2009	P.N. Elrod		Honorable Mention, 2009 Pearl Award, Best Anthology
Vampires: Dracula and the Undead Legions	The Company You Keep	2009		Moonstone Books	Vampire Files story - Kroun
Dark and Stormy Knights	Dark Lady	2010	P.N. Elrod	St. Martin's Griffin	Vampire Files story
Chicks Kick Butt	Vampires Prefer Blondes	Jun 2011		Tor	Vampire Files - Bobbi Smythe
The P.N. Elrod Lunch Time Reading Omnibus		Jun 2011	P.N. Elrod	Vampwriter Books	B0051PC6N8,
Ellery Queen's Mystery Magazine	Beach Girl	Nov 2011			original story; winner of EQMM Readers Choice Award for 2011
Vampire Files Volume 3	Chill in the Blood Dark Sleep	2011			Vampire Files Books 7, 8
Vampire Files Volume 4	Lady Crymsyn Cold Streets	2011			Vampire Files Books 9, 10
Vampire Files Volume 5	Song in the Dark Dark Road Rising	2012			Vampire Files Books 11, 12
Hex Appeal	Outside the Box	Jun 2012	P.N. Elrod	St. Martin's Griffin	Vampire Files universe story, Ellinghaus & Goldfarb
