= The Morganville Vampires =

Novel series by Rachel Caine

- Author: Rachel Caine
- Language: English
- Series: The Morganville Vampires
- Subject: Vampires
- Genre: Urban Fantasy / Vampire
- Publisher: New American Library
- Publication date: October 2006–2014
- Media type: Print (Hardback & Paperback)

The Morganville Vampires is a series of young adult urban fantasy/vampire novels written by Rachel Caine. The novels feature Claire Danvers, a student at Texas Prairie University, and her housemates in the vampire-controlled city of Morganville, Texas. While the mayor of Morganville is human, the population co-exist with a group of vampires. Morganville is also home to an unusually large number of second-hand thrift stores.

Several of the novels have made the New York Times bestseller list. In September 2009, Caine announced that she had signed a contract with Signet to write books 10, 11, and 12 in the series. The following year, in January 2010 Rachel Caine revealed that beginning with book 9, Ghost Town, novels in this series would first be released in hardback. In September 2011 three further books were contracted for the series bringing the total to 15.

== Series ==
=== Novels and anthology ===
1. Glass Houses (October 2006, Signet Books, ISBN 0-451-21994-5)
2. The Dead Girls' Dance (April 2007, Signet Books, ISBN 0-451-22089-7)
3. Midnight Alley (October 2007, Signet Books, ISBN 0-451-22238-5)
4. Feast of Fools (June 2008, Signet Books, ISBN 0-451-22463-9)
5. Lord of Misrule (January 2009, Signet Books, ISBN 0-451-22572-4)
6. Carpe Corpus (June 2009, Signet Books, ISBN 0-451-22719-0)
7. Fade Out (November 2009, Signet Books, ISBN 0-451-22866-9)
8. Kiss of Death (April 27, 2010, Signet Books, ISBN 0-451-22973-8)
9. Ghost Town (October 26, 2010, NAL Hardcover, ISBN 0-451-23161-9)
10. Bite Club (May 3, 2011, NAL Hardcover, ISBN 0-451-23318-2)
11. Last Breath (November 1, 2011, NAL Hardcover, ISBN 0-451-23487-1)
12. Black Dawn (May 1, 2012, NAL Hardcover, ISBN 0-451-23671-8)
13. Bitter Blood (November 6, 2012, NAL Hardcover, ISBN 0-451-23811-7)
14. Fall Of Night (May 7, 2013, NAL Hardcover, ISBN 0-451-41425-X)
15. Daylighters (November 5, 2013, NAL Hardcover, ISBN 0-451-41427-6)
16. Midnight Bites (March 1, 2016, Berkley Softcover, ISBN 978-1101989784)

=== Short stories ===
- "All Hallows" in The Eternal Kiss (2009, ISBN 978-0-7624-3717-7) and Midnight Bites (2016, ISBN 978-1101989784)
- "Amelie's Story" in Midnight Bites (2016, ISBN 978-1101989784)
- "And One for the Devil" in Midnight Bites (2016, ISBN 978-1101989784)
- "Anger Management" and Midnight Bites (2016, ISBN 978-1101989784)
- "Automatic" in Enthralled: Paranormal Diversions and Midnight Bites (2016, ISBN 978-1101989784)
- "Dark Rides" and Midnight Bites (2016, ISBN 978-1101989784)
- "Dead Man Stalking" in Immortal: Love Stories With Bite and Vampires: The Recent Undead and Midnight Bites (2016, ISBN 978-1101989784)
- "Drama Queen's Last Dance" in Eternal: More Love Stories with Bite and Midnight Bites (2016, ISBN 978-1101989784)
- "The First Day of the Rest of Your Life" in Many Bloody Returns and Midnight Bites (2016, ISBN 978-1101989784)
- "Grudge" in Midnight Bites (2016, ISBN 978-1101989784)
- "Home: A Morganville Story" in Hex Life: Wicked New Tales of Witchery
- "Let Them Eat Cake"
- "Lunch Date" in Midnight Bites (2016, ISBN 978-1101989784)
- "Murdered Out" in the UK version of Carpe Corpus and Midnight Bites (2016, ISBN 978-1101989784)
- "Myrnin's Tale" in Midnight Bites (2016, ISBN 978-1101989784)
- "New Blood" in Midnight Bites (2016, ISBN 978-1101989784)
- "Nothing Like an Angel" in Midnight Bites (2016, ISBN 978-1101989784)
- "Pitch-Black Blues" in Midnight Bites (2016, ISBN 978-1101989784)
- "Sam's Story" in Midnight Bites (2016, ISBN 978-1101989784)
- "Signs and Miracles" in Midnight Bites (2016, ISBN 978-1101989784)
- "Vexed" in Midnight Bites (2016, ISBN 978-1101989784)
- "The Viper and the Farmer"
- "A Whisper in the Dark" in Midnight Bites (2016, ISBN 978-1101989784)
- "Worth Living For" in UK version of Ghost Town and Midnight Bites (2016, ISBN 978-1101989784)
- "Wrong Place, Wrong Time" and Midnight Bites (2016, ISBN 978-1101989784)
- "Your Mileage May Vary"

== Characters ==
- Claire Danvers, the main protagonist of the series, comes to the town of Morganville when she becomes a student at Texas Prairie University. Graduating high school early and attending university at the age of 16, she is one of the youngest characters in the series but is exceptionally intelligent for her age which causes many people (especially vampires) to take a special interest in her. Although intelligent in most subjects, Claire is exceptional at science and her intelligence can cause some to dislike/misunderstand her. She is the assistant of Myrnin and was assigned to the job by Amelie, the Founder of Morganville and the oldest vampire in the world (other than Bishop). Claire becomes close friends with Myrnin because of their similar intellectual interests; although their relationship has been strained at points by Myrnin's impulsive, uncontrolled conduct due to both his vampire nature and the effects of a disease some vampires contract with age. At one point Bishop takes an unwilling Claire to be his minion, partially as a 'slap' to Amelie as Claire is one of the few humans the founder is shown to care for. Claire is dating town bad boy Shane Collins, which her parents do not appreciate, stating that they think she is too young to have a boyfriend. After moving to Morganville themselves, they frequently insist that she move back in with them. Claire is best friends with the town goth, Eve Rosser, (who often calls her 'CB', short for "Claire Bear") and also with musician Michael Glass (who treats her more like a little sister) and enemies with Monica Morrell, who despises and torments her initially but has since developed a grudging respect for her. From the beginning in Glass Houses, Claire is somewhat naive but as the series moves forward, she quickly shows herself to be tough and clever (if sometimes slightly reckless), and has incorporated herself into Morganville's vampire-ruled world better than most of the other human population. She is well known by vampires and humans alike, sometimes respected and sometimes hated by individuals from both sides as vampires tend to think she is allowed too much liberty (as humans are unofficially considered second-class), and humans often view her as a traitor and puppet of the vampires. As of Last Breath, Claire was killed by the master draug, Magnus, but the Glass House saved her like it did Michael, by making her into a ghost but trapping her within the Glass Houses walls. Claire is described as small and short with brown hair, although towards the end it is described as mostly red than brown thanks to Eve. At the end of Bitter Blood Claire get permission to leave Morganville to go to MIT, a gift from the founder for all the work she has done for the town. She briefly attends MIT but after discovering the Daylight Foundation she returns to Morganville to find they have taken over; she then aids in the rescue of the vampires and the bringing down of the Daylighters.
- Michael Glass is a Morganville native and owner of the Glass House. His grandfather is Sam Glass. When the series begins, Shane and Eve are already living with Michael when Claire joins them as a fourth roommate. After Michael's mysterious disappearance during the day begins to strain his relationship with his housemates, Michael is forced to explain his strange behavior. After being attacked in his house and left for dead by Oliver (who was attempting to turn him into a vampire, but failed), Michael has become a "part of the house"—he is effectively a ghost, vanishing by day and corporeal at night. In this state, Michael can draw power from the house itself, making him extremely powerful inside it (while in a corporeal state); however, he cannot leave the house, which leaves him intensely frustrated with his inability to protect his friends when they are out of his reach. To escape this fate, he convinces Amelie to turn him into a vampire, which puts further pressure on his friendship with Shane. Michael is very responsible, mature, and charming, with a kind, noble, generous nature (to the point that he has been described as a boy scout). For all his loving, patient manner he is very protective of his loved ones and quite aggressive when provoked. He is an amazing musician and in the book Kiss Of Death he is offered a record deal, and a chance to leave Morganville for recording. He records a demo CD, but nothing is stated to come of it afterwards. In the last book he is forcibly given a cure to vampirism with a low success rate, fortunately he survives and turns back into a human. He starts a relationship with Eve early into the series and they marry twice (their first marriage was forcibly annulled because it was a mixed species marriage). Michael is described as very good looking by many female characters in the series. He is tall, lean built, has sincere blue eyes and blonde hair.
- Shane Collins is one of the Glass House residents and is a Morganville native. He is hotheaded with a penchant for getting in trouble, often by his own doing. Regardless, he is very protective, a quality which extends especially to Claire, Michael, and Eve. He has a fierce hatred for vampires which causes strife especially between him and Michael but has slowly started to accept that not all vampires are bad, like Michael. He initially returned to Morganville on a mission from his father, Frank, to find out ways to kill the vampires. He despises Monica Morrell because he believes she killed his sister, Alyssa, in a house fire (even though it has not been proven... no one doubts). Soon after the fire, Shane and his parents left Morganville, hoping to escape the reminder of Alyssa's death. Shane's family quickly began to fall apart. His father's alcoholism worsened, causing him to become abusive, and his mother's memory block began to fail, allowing her to remember Morganville and the vampires. Shane and his father believe that she was killed by vampires at Amelie's bidding, though the death was made to look like a suicide. This leads Shane and Frank on a vengeful path to destroy the vampires. Shane eventually rejects his father's violent agenda, furthering the rift between them. Shane frequently struggles with his anger and has been known to cave into his urges toward fighting and violence, which becomes especially problematic in Bite Club, although since then it appears that he is genuinely trying to change his behavior. He is described as very tall with a lot of muscle. He is very good looking and has brown eyes and hair.
- Eve Rosser She is a Morganville native but turned down Protection from her family's vampire Patron/Protector, Brandon, who appears to have been sexually harassing her starting when she was around fifteen, she refused and he may have started abusing her younger brother, Jason instead. She dresses quite extravagantly in all-Goth clothing and makeup, partly as a way to make fun of the vampires. Although she is generally very upbeat, energetic, and independent, she tends to be emotional and occasionally melodramatic. She is smart-mouthed and at times outspoken to the point of recklessness, and has, at some point, offended nearly all of the vampires in town. Eve has a deeply troubled past with her younger brother, Jason, who is a criminal and claims to have murdered many girls, and later threatens to kill Claire. Eve drives a very old black Cadillac; in the book Kiss of Death her Cadillac gets destroyed and she buys a black hearse to replace it. In Fade Out she plays the theater role of Blanche DuBois, one of the two leading ladies in A Streetcar Named Desire. When the series begins Eve works at Common Grounds and is strongly attached to her boss, Oliver; however, this affection quickly turns to hatred and she quits the job when Eve discovers that Oliver is not only a vampire but killed Michael. Eve spends some time working at the university coffee shop instead, but by Kiss of Death has returned to work at Common Grounds. She and Oliver's relationship remains quite uneasy but has softened once again from the state of mutual hatred that they harbored for a while; although most of their interactions consist of Eve going out of her way to annoy him and the two pushing each other's buttons, they do still seem to like each other on some level, even reportedly sharing a dance in Bite Club. Eve is described as being a tall and pretty girl. She dresses in a very extravagant manner, as a goth mostly to mock the vampires in Morganville. Eve had a crush on Michael before the start of their relationship which started early on in the series, they marry twice (their first marriage was forcibly annulled due to him being a vampire and her a human).
- Sam Glass is Michael Glass's vampire grandfather, and the second youngest vampire, he only had been a vampire for 50 years. He helps Claire out a lot in the first few books (until Feast of Fools). He also loves the founder, Amelie. He wants to try to make things better for everyone. He hates Bishop, because Bishop is cruel to Amelie, although it is extremely likely he hates him just because he is a horrible person. Sam is one of the kindest vampires, and often prefers human company. In one case, he saves Claire Danvers from getting raped in The Dead Girls' Dance. He has red hair and freckles with the same blue eyes as his grandson Michael. He was the youngest vampire in Morganville until Michael was turned. Sam was killed by Bishop draining him which resulted in Bishop being poisoned.
- Amelie, a vampire, is the founder of Morganville. Her vampire and blood line father is Bishop even though she hates him. She is also Claire's Patron/Protector. She is also the lover of Michael Glass's grandfather Sam Glass but at the end of Ghost Town she starts to fall in love with Oliver. She is described to be a short and lean woman with silvery blond hair and grey eyes, she has an icy personality. Claire and Shane nickname her "ice queen". As with all vampires, she looks very young but is around 1500 years of age. She is considered to be the high queen of Morganville. Amelie has shown throughout the series a connection to Claire; she seems to see her as a daughter. This connection is often seen as her weakness, and strength alike. She is willing to do things Claire's way and shows she feels a growing sense of affection for Claire, though she seldom shows it. And at the end of Last Breath, Amelie was bitten by the master draug, Magnus, and starts to become one in Black Dawn. Although she does survive. She does change over the books and tries to make things better for the human population of Morganville, after Sam's and Claire's request.
- Oliver, is a vampire elder and Amelie's second in command, though they have their differences, they get along. He is from England. He is very proud, arrogant and cold and is described appropriately as the 'Don of the local Morganville mafia'. However, it is revealed later on in the series that he has strong feelings for Amelie. In Ghost Town Oliver challenges Amelie. He then takes the place as head of Morganville. Later Amelie forgets and takes it back. Further into the series, they become equals. His character is based on Oliver Cromwell and is implied to be Oliver Cromwell. He runs one of the two local coffee shops, Common Grounds, which is a place where vampires and humans can meet equally and safely. He is usually dressed in hippie fashion, though it's only a disguise, and prefers to wear black, and leather. He appears to hate everyone, but throughout the series is shown to care some about Amelie, Claire and Eve, though appears not to be able to care less about Shane. During Black Dawn, Oliver takes control again when Amelie is sick (after getting bitten by the draug Magnus), and almost has to kill her, but she retakes control after Magnus is killed.
- Myrnin, a Welsh (bipolar) vampire from Conwy, an ancient alchemist searching for a cure to the vampire disease which he suffers from (in the first few books) and Claire becomes his apprentice at Amelie's request, though she is eager to learn from him. He chose to be turned vampire in a quest to research eternally. Myrnin loves bunny slippers with fangs as well as flip-flops, silk vests, pirate boots, and old Victorian ensembles (often paired with atrociously coloured Hawaiian shorts). Myrnin has killed almost all of his (five) previous assistants from loss of control, except for Claire. Myrnin was still in love with his old (and deceased) assistant and lover, Ada. When he killed Ada, he saved her brain and hooked it up to a machine that runs the whole town of Morganville as a favor to her, Amelie, and himself. After Ada's machine breaks and she dies for good, he and Claire use another system, which causes the whole town to forget the past three years and believe that it is three years prior. To fix this, Myrnin takes advantage of Frank Collins' death and uses his brain for the machine in place of his own. Myrnin is incredibly smart but can be reckless and crazy. He develops strong feelings for Claire and cares for her deeply, despite knowing how Claire feels about Shane, Myrnin does kiss her at one point when he's about to leave Morganville.
- Monica Morrell is a beautiful, yet cruel, psychopathic college student who is Claire's initial antagonist in the series. Her father (and then later her brother, Richard) is the human mayor of the secretly vampire-controlled town. She hates Claire because Claire made her look stupid after correcting her about China's involvement in World War Two. A few years before the series she had a crush on Shane and he rejected her, it is implied that she then burned down his house, which killed his sister, or at least that is what everyone believes while she profusely denies doing so. Nearly every time Monica has an encounter with Claire, she is mean to her. However, throughout the series, Claire and Monica develop a kind of truce, as Monica develops a bit of respect for Claire because of her braveness and courage; however, most of the time Monica does not show this.
- Mr. Bishop is Amelie's father through both her immortal and mortal bloodlines. He is portrayed to be ancient and is often described as "old school evil." Bishop seems to have a world-domination mentality and has the adamant idea that all humans are beneath him, therefore handy slaves/walking blood bags. He enters the series at the end of Midnight Alley with his sidekicks Francois and Ysandre. He wants revenge on Amelie and Myrnin for trying to kill him hundreds of years ago. He also wants to rule over Morganville and all of its inhabitants - vampire and human. He returns in Bite Club and still wants to rule all of Morganville as its sole vampire ruler. Although he is later killed.
- Frank Collins is Shane's dad. They have a rough history with each other, starting with the deaths of Shane's mother and sister. Shane's dad physically abused him frequently and it is witnessed several times throughout the series. Frank sent Shane back to Morganville as part of a large plot to kill all of the vampires in revenge for the death of Shane's mother. Frank is later turned into a vampire by Mr. Bishop. Frank sacrifices himself to save Shane and Claire, and later becomes the 'Brain' controlling Myrnin's Vampire Super Computer. He makes Claire promise not to tell Shane, because then Shane can move on with his life, but in the end Shane does find out.
- Ada was Myrnin's lover and Myrnin's first assistant to die by his hands. After her death, Myrnin turned her into a vampire. In a bout of madness, Myrnin killed Ada and turned her into the town's vampire supercomputer. Over time, Ada is fed Myrnin's disease-ridden blood and eventually loses her sanity and tries to kill Claire because she is afraid Claire is stealing Myrnin from her. Just before dying, Ada regains lucidity and apologizes to Claire and asks Claire to also tell Myrnin that she is sorry. Ada uses the self-destruct code and kills herself because she knows how much of a threat she is to Morganville (and Myrnin) if she stays alive. Ada dies a noble death and Myrnin is grief-stricken.
- Magnus is the master draug that has been hunting the vampires forever. In Last Breath, he kills Claire and catches most of the vampires, like Michael, Oliver, and Amelie's blood sister Naomi (who at the end, gets freed). He also bites Amelie, causing more chaos.
- Hannah Moses serves as the town's police chief, she was briefly mayor but due to Oliver's hold on Amelie, Hannah is forced to step down and is replaced as mayor by Flora Ramos. Hannah regains her role as police chief. Up until shortly before her introduction in the series Hannah was a US Marine that was stationed in Afghanistan.
- Richard Morrell was the town's mayor, after his father's death. He is also Monica's brother. It is implied that he and Hannah have feelings for each other but nothing comes of it as he is killed by the draug.

== Synopsis ==
Glass Houses
Welcome to Morganville. Just do not stay out after dark.

Morganville is a small town filled with unusual characters - when the sun goes down, the bad come out. In Morganville, there is an evil that lurks in the darkest shadows - one that will spill out into the bright light of day.

For Claire Danvers, high school was hell, but college may be murder. It was bad enough that she got on the wrong side of Monica, the meanest of the school's mean girls, but now she has got three new roommates, who all have secrets of their own. And the biggest secret of all is not really a secret, except from Claire: Morganville is run by vampires, and they are hungry for fresh blood.

Dead Girls' Dance
Good news, girls: your dates are here!

Claire Danvers has had her share of challenges - like being a genius in a school that favours beauty over brains, dealing with the homicidal girls in her dorm and, above all, finding out that her college town is overrun with bloodsucking fiends. On the plus side, so far Claire and her friends have managed to survive getting on the wrong side of some Morganville VIPs - Vampire Important Persons. But their temporary peace is in danger of collapsing, thanks to the arrival of her new boyfriend's scary father and his vampire-fighting supporters.

Bad news, girls: they're dead.

Midnight Alley
In the third book of the series, Claire makes an important decision that determines the rest of her life. This leads her to finding out the deepest, darkest secret in Morganville, enough to destroy the city – if it falls into the wrong hands. She must learn all she can to save her best friend, patron, and those she tolerates. With Monica kicking up and Shane in more trouble than ever, Claire must work to protect her friends and herself.

Feast of Fools
In the town of Morganville, vampires and humans live in relative peace together. Student Claire Danvers has never been convinced, though — especially with the arrival of Mr. Bishop, an ancient, old-school vampire who cares nothing about harmony. What he wants from the town's living and its dead is unthinkably sinister. It is only at a formal ball, attended by vampires and their human dates, that Claire realizes the elaborately evil trap he has set for Morganville.

Lord Of Misrule
In the college town of Morganville, vampires and humans coexist in (relatively) bloodless harmony. Then comes Bishop, the master vampire who threatens to abolish all order, revive the forces of the evil undead, and let chaos rule. But Bishop is not the only threat. Violent black cyclone clouds hover, promising a storm of devastating proportions as student Claire Danvers and her friends prepare to be in for a whole lot if trouble.

Carpe Corpus
To protect her friends (as much as possible), Claire has been forced to side with Bishop as the battle for Morganville rages on. Somehow, Claire manages to save Shane, reconcile with Michael, and make up with Eve. Claire and Myrnin also may have discovered a cure to the vampire disease. Now they still have the problem of Bishop controlling the city. To save Morganville, someone unexpected has to pay the ultimate price that leaves the entire town in mourning.

Fade Out
Morganville has stabilized into a kind of peace (although it may only be skin deep), but new players are entering the scene, and the course of true love never does run smoothly, especially when an old girlfriend drops in for a visit. And the phrase "hidden camera" takes on entirely new and significant meaning for our heroes in the Glass House.

Kiss of Death
Claire Danvers and her friends have been given an offer they cannot refuse – time away from Morganville, with an escort of course. But when they encounter trouble of both the human and vampire varieties they begin to realize life outside Morganville is not all it is cracked up to be.

Ghost Town
The fragile peace between humans and vampires in Morganville is in trouble, and when Claire takes drastic action, she is put under serious pressure to re-establish the barriers that keep the town residents inside and wipe the memories of those who leave. But working with her half-crazy vampire boss Myrnin means that things do not always turn out as planned...and as the people of Morganville begin acting strangely, Claire and her friends must solve the mystery and try to put things right. But one by one, her allies are turning on her... even the ones she trusts most.

Bite Club
After discovering that vampires populate her town, college student Claire Danvers knows that the undead just want to live their lives. But someone else wants them to get ready to rumble. There is a new extreme sport getting picked up on the Internet: bare- knuckle fights pitting captured vampires against each other-or humans. Tracking the remote signal leads Claire—accompanied by her friends and frenemies—to discover that what started as an online brawl will soon threaten everyone in Morganville.

Last Breath
There is a question Claire has long been asking: why do vampires live so far out in a sunny desert when they are sensitive to sunlight? The reason does not have to do with sunlight but water - and an ancient enemy who has finally found a way to invade the vampires' landlocked community. Vampires are not the top predator on earth. There is something worse that preys on them... something much worse. Which means if Claire, and Morganville, want to live, they will have to fight on to the last breath. With her boss preoccupied researching the Founder Houses in Morganville, Claire is left to her own devices when she learns that three vampires have vanished without a trace. She soon discovers that the last person seen with one of the missing vampires is someone new to town-a mysterious individual named Magnus. After an uneasy encounter with Morganville's latest resident, Claire is certain Magnus is not merely human. But is he a vampire-or something else entirely?

Black Dawn
When a tide of ferocious draug, the vampire's deadliest enemy, floods Morganville, its eclectic mix of residents must fight to save their town from devastation. Chaos has taken over the quiet college town of Morganville as the threat of the draug rapidly spreads with the help of the city's water system. Whilst most of the locals have already fled, student Claire Danvers and her friends Shane, Eve and Michael choose to stay and fight. Things take a turn for the worse when vampire Amelie, the town's founder, is infected by the master draug's bite. Unless Claire and her friends can find an antidote to save Amelie and overcome the draug, Morganville's future looks bleak...

Bitter Blood
Thanks to the eradication of the draug, the vampires of Morganville have been freed of their usual constraints. With the vampires indulging their every whim, the town's human population is determined to hold onto their lives by taking up arms. But college student Claire Danvers is not taking sides, considering she has ties to both humans and vampires. To make matters worse, a television show comes to Morganville looking for ghosts, just as vampire and human politics collide. Now, Claire and her friends have to figure out how to keep the peace without ending up on the nightly news...or worse.

Fall Of Night
Thanks to its unique mix of human and vampire residents, Morganville, Texas, is a small college town with big-time problems. But it is not the only town with vampire trouble ...Claire never thought she would leave Morganville, but when she gets accepted into the graduate course at MIT, she cannot pass up the opportunity. Saying goodbye to her friends, especially her boyfriend Shane, is bittersweet, and her new life at MIT is both scary and exciting. Enrolled in a special advanced study programme with Professor Irene Anderson, former Morganville native, Claire is able to work on VLAD, her machine designed to cancel the mental abilities of vampires. But Morganville and its inhabitants are never really far from Claire's mind. When she begins testing her machine on live subjects, things quickly spiral out of control, and Claire begins to wonder whether leaving Morganville was the last mistake she will ever make ...

Daylighters
Something drastic has happened in Morganville while Claire and her friends were away. The town looks cleaner and happier than they have ever seen it before, but when their incoming group is arrested and separated - vampires from humans - they realise that the changes definitely are not for the better. It seems that an organisation called the Daylight Foundation has offered the population of Morganville something they have never had hope of a vampire-free future. And while it sounds like salvation - even for the vampires themselves - the truth is far more sinister and deadly. Now, Claire, Shane and Eve need to find a way to break their friends out of Daylighter custody, before the vampires of Morganville meet their untimely end ...

Midnight Bites
Six brand-new stories from the author of the bestselling Morganville Vampires. This edition sees all of Caine's Morganville short stories featured in one edition, for the first time.

== Key locations ==
=== The Glass House ===
The protagonists of the novels are the four young adults who live in The Glass House. The house has a mind of its own and often does things for the young heroes. It is also a safe haven for those in need. It is kept safe by "founder's protection". The house is also what saved Michael Glass when Oliver attacked him a few years back. So Michael is now trapped to house for the rest of his life but can never die, because he is already dead. However, in The Dead Girl's Dance Michael, in order to help Shane, who is sentenced to death and to be able to get out of the house, asks Amelie to turn him into a vampire. As he said "I'm half-alive, Claire. There's no going back, i can only go forwards". After this he is a full-fledged vampire.

=== Myrnin's Lab ===
Myrnin's Lab is the place that Claire works at in Midnight Alley. It is also home to her boss Myrnin also known as the 'Trapdoor Spider'. It is located next to the Day house, secretly hidden from everyone but those Amelie wishes to share this information with. It is rumored if you happen to walk down there Myrnin will feast on the unprotected, which he can tell if you're not, without looking for a bracelet. Myrnin's Lab is a place of work for sciences, mostly alchemy.

=== Texas Prairie University ===
A third-tier state university, often used as a starter school by students unable to get into challenging institutions of higher education. Most of the students there are apparently unaware of the strange things that happen in Morganville. Monica's abuse of Claire here is what drove Claire to seek out the Glass House in the first place.

=== Common Grounds ===
A coffee shop located just off the TPU campus, Common Grounds acts as neutral territory for meetings between the human and vampire population. This was the place Eve Rosser worked until she found out her hippie boss was actually a powerful vampire who tried to turn Michael into a vampire. This place plays great importance throughout the entire series. It is owned by vampire mafia boss Oliver.

=== Founder's Houses ===
Houses similar to Claire's own, these houses are located throughout Morganville. They are connected to each other through Ada, Myrnin's invention that keeps up memory barriers in town (later replaced by Frank Collins, Shane's father). Amelie often makes her appearances in these houses in the early novels. Houses referred to in the novels include the Glass house, the Day house, and Claire's parents house.

== Adaptations ==
It has been announced on the author's website that the rights to a Morganville Vampire film/TV series and any other multimedia production have been sold to the people behind the popular series Red Dwarf and Paramount Pictures.

== Morganville: The Series ==
In June 2013, a Kickstarter campaign was launched to help adapt The Morganville Vampires into a web TV series with Amber Benson attached to star as Amelie, the founder of Morganville and Blake Calhoun signed on as director and producer. Rachel Caine has also come on board as writer and producer. On July 11, 2013, the Kickstarter campaign was successful, raising a total of $81,752.

On July 26, 2013, Rachel announced that the scripts for the first season were completed. On October 22, 2014, a trailer for the series was uploaded to YouTube by Geek & Sundry.
