= Charlaine Harris =

American mystery writer (born 1951)

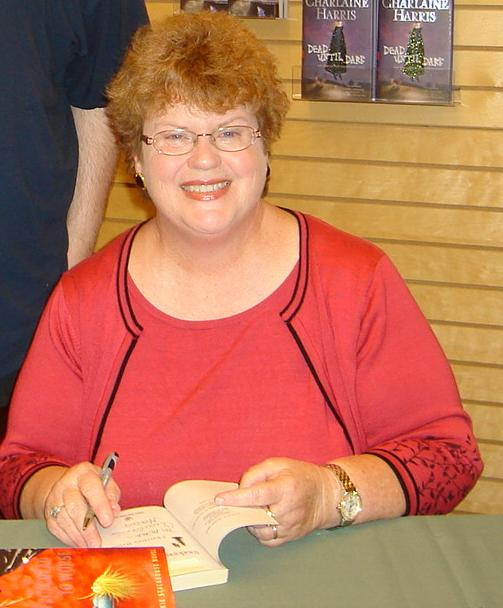
- Born: Charlaine Harris; November 25, 1951 (age 74); Tunica, Mississippi, U.S.
- Education: Rhodes College
- Occupation: Novelist
- Spouse: Hal Schulz (m. 1978)
- Children: 3
- Writing career
- Genre: Mystery fiction / Southern Gothic
- Notable work: The Southern Vampire Mysteries / True Blood
- Notable awards: Lord Ruthven Award (2003 and 2018); Inkpot Award (2010)
- Website: www.charlaineharris.com

Jean Charlaine Harris Schulz (born November 25, 1951) is an American author who specializes in mysteries. She is best known for her book series The Southern Vampire Mysteries, which was adapted as the TV series True Blood. The television show was a critical and financial success for HBO, running seven seasons, from 2008 through 2014.

Harris was born and raised in Tunica, Mississippi. She lives in Texas with her husband; they have three children. She began writing from an early age, and changed from playwriting in college to writing and publishing mysteries, including several long series featuring recurring characters.

== Life and career ==
Harris was born and grew up in Tunica, Mississippi, in the Mississippi Delta. In her early work she wrote poems about ghosts and teenage angst. She began writing plays while attending Rhodes College in Memphis, Tennessee. Her most recent mysteries have been in the urban fantasy genre.

After publishing two stand-alone mysteries, Harris began the lighthearted Aurora Teagarden books with Real Murders, nominated as a Best Novel 1990 for the Agatha Awards. Harris wrote several books in the series before the mid-1990s, when she began branching out into other works. She did not resume the series until 1999, with the exception of one short story in an anthology titled "Murder, They Wrote".

In 1996, Harris published the first in the Shakespeare series, featuring cleaning lady detective Lily Bard, set in rural Arkansas. At the time, a New York Times interview with Harris noted that she "live[d] in small-town Arkansas". The fifth book in the series, Shakespeare's Counselor, was published in fall 2001, followed by the short story "Dead Giveaway", published in the Ellery Queen Mystery Magazine in December 2001. Harris has said she is finished with that series.

Next Harris created The Southern Vampire Mysteries series, about a telepathic waitress named Sookie Stackhouse who works in a Northern Louisiana bar. The first book, Dead Until Dark, won the Anthony Award for Best Paperback Mystery in 2001. Each book follows Sookie as she tries to solve mysteries involving vampires, werewolves, and other supernatural creatures. The series has been published in Australia, New Zealand, Japan, Spain, Greece, Germany, the Netherlands, Belgium, France, Italy, Argentina, Poland, Serbia, Brazil, Great Britain, Ireland, Mexico, Norway, Finland, Sweden, Denmark, Lithuania, Hungary, Bulgaria, Portugal, Iceland, Czech Republic, Romania, Estonia, and Israel. Harris wrote thirteen novels in the series; the last, Dead Ever After, was published in May 2013. A supplemental book, After Dead, was published in October 2013. The second novel, Living Dead in Dallas, won the 2003 Lord Ruthven Award for Fiction, and the anthology The Complete Sookie Stackhouse Stories won the 2018 Ruthven Award for Fiction.

October 2005 marked the debut of Harris's new series, entitled Harper Connelly Mysteries, with the release of Grave Sight. The series is told by a young woman named Harper Connelly, who after being struck by lightning, is able to locate dead bodies and to see their last moments through the eyes of the deceased. In October 2010, it was announced Harper Connelly's series had been optioned for a television series named Grave Sight.

The year 2014 marked the debut of the Cemetery Girl series, a graphic novel series co-written with Christopher Golden and illustrated by Don Kramer.

Harris is a member of the Mystery Writers of America and the American Crime Writers League, and has served as a member of the board of Sisters in Crime and as president of the Arkansas Mystery Writers Alliance.

Harris's novel Hold My Spellbook, the first book in the Stronghold series, will be published by Saga Press on 9 February 2027. The fantasy novel follows Hannalyn Sevrene, who discovers that she is the last surviving member of a powerful family of mages after most of her family is killed in an attack. The story follows her efforts to learn magic and survive threats from rival families.

== Personal life ==
Harris has long been married. She and her husband have three grown children and two grandchildren. She is a former weightlifter and karate student. She is also an avid reader and cinemaphile. Harris formerly resided in Magnolia, Arkansas, where she was the senior warden of St. James Episcopal Church, and as of 2017 lives in Texas. She has recounted that, at age 25, she was sexually assaulted at knifepoint by an intruder in her home. This led to her pursuing Karate and weightlifting. It's also why the protagonists of her novels are "women who strike back."

== Adaptations ==
=== Audio ===
Harris' novels have often been adapted as full-cast dramatised productions by GraphicAudio, starting with their adaptation of her Cemetery Girl graphic novels. The company also adapted her Midnight Texas series, and her Gunnie Rose novels.

=== Television ===
The True Blood logo

Her series of novels The Southern Vampire Mysteries was adapted into the show True Blood. The series lasted seven seasons and totaled 80 episodes. It was nominated for dozens of awards. True Blood aired on HBO. The show was also the most viewed show on HBO since The Sopranos.

In 2014, Hallmark Movies & Mysteries began adapting Harris' Aurora Teagarden novels into a series of television films, starring Candace Cameron Bure.

Harris's series Midnight, Texas was developed as a TV series by NBC and began airing on their network in 2017.

=== Video games ===
- Dying for Daylight (February 2011)
  - The first all new video game written by Charlaine Harris, released by iPlay Games; starring Dahlia
  - Based on Book 10: Dead in the Family
- Shakespeare's Landlord - an interactive game (January 2018)
  - Video game adapted from Charlaine Harris' novel of the same name, developed by One More Story Games
  - Based on Book 1: Shakespeare's Landlord

== Published works ==
=== Aurora Teagarden series (1990–present) ===
1. Real Murders (1990) ISBN 0-8027-5769-3
2. A Bone to Pick (1992) ISBN 0-8027-1245-2
3. Three Bedrooms, One Corpse (1994) ISBN 0-684-19643-3
4. The Julius House (1995) ISBN 0-684-19640-9
5. Dead Over Heels (1996) ISBN 0-684-80429-8
6. "Deeply Dead" in Murder, They Wrote
7. A Fool and His Honey (1999) ISBN 0-312-20306-3
8. Last Scene Alive (2002) ISBN 0-312-26246-9
9. Poppy Done to Death (2003) ISBN 0-312-27764-4
10. All the Little Liars (2016) ISBN 1250090032
11. Sleep Like a Baby (2017) ISBN 978-1-250-09006-5

=== Lily Bard (Shakespeare) series (1996–2001) ===
1. Shakespeare's Landlord (1996) ISBN 0-312-14415-6
2. Shakespeare's Champion (1997) ISBN 0-312-17005-X
3. Shakespeare's Christmas (1998) ISBN 0-312-19330-0
4. Shakespeare's Trollop (2000) ISBN 0-312-26228-0
5. Shakespeare's Counselor (2001) 0-312-27762-8

5.1. "Dead Giveaway" published in Ellery Queen Mystery Magazine (December 2001)

=== Sookie Stackhouse series (2001–14) ===
For more detailed information see The Southern Vampire Mysteries/True Blood.

#	Title	Also In	Publication Date	ISBN	Comments
1	Dead Until Dark	Sookie Stackhouse 8 Copy Boxed Set	May 2001	ISBN 0-441-00853-4	
2	Living Dead in Dallas	Sookie Stackhouse 8 Copy Boxed Set	Mar 2002	ISBN 0-441-00923-9	
3	Club Dead	Sookie Stackhouse 8 Copy Boxed Set	May 2003	ISBN 0-441-00923-9	
4	Dead to the World	Sookie Stackhouse 8 Copy Boxed Set	Mar 2004	ISBN 0-441-01167-5	
4.1	Fairy Dust	Powers of Detection A Touch of Dead The Complete Sookie Stackhouse Stories			
4.2	Dracula Night	Many Bloody Returns A Touch of Dead The Complete Sookie Stackhouse Stories			
4.3	Dancers in the Dark	Night's Edge			novella
5	Dead as a Doornail	Sookie Stackhouse 8 Copy Boxed Set	May 2005	ISBN 0-441-01279-5	
5.1	One Word Answer	Bite A Touch of Dead The Complete Sookie Stackhouse Stories			
6	Definitely Dead	Sookie Stackhouse 8 Copy Boxed Set	May 2006	ISBN 0-441-01400-3	
6.1	Tacky	My Big, Fat Supernatural Wedding			Dahlia short story
7	All Together Dead	Sookie Stackhouse 8 Copy Boxed Set	May 2007	ISBN 0-441-01494-1	
7.1	Lucky	Unusual Suspects Between the Dark and Daylight A Touch of Dead The Complete Sookie Stackhouse Stories			
8	From Dead to Worse	Sookie Stackhouse 8 Copy Boxed Set	May 2008	ISBN 0-441-01589-1	
8.1	Gift Wrap	Wolfsbane and Mistletoe A Touch of Dead The Complete Sookie Stackhouse Stories			
8.2	Bacon	Strange Brew			makes an offhand reference to Jim Butcher's wizard, Harry Dresden; a Dahlia short story
9	Dead and Gone		May 2009	ISBN 0-441-01715-0	
9.1	The Britlingens Go to Hell	Must Love Hellhounds			
9.2	Dahlia Underground	Crimes by Moonlight			takes place during All Together Dead; a Dahlia short story
10	Dead in the Family		May 2010		
10.1	Two Blondes	Death's Excellent Vacation The Complete Sookie Stackhouse Stories			
10.2	Small-Town Wedding	The Sookie Stackhouse Companion'' The Complete Sookie Stackhouse Stories			novella
10.3	A Very Vampire Christmas	Glamour Magazine	Dec 2010		a Dahlia short story
11	Dead Reckoning		May 2011		
11.1	Death by Dahlia	Down These Strange Streets			a Dahlia short story
12	Deadlocked		May 2012		
12.1	If I Had a Hammer	Home Improvement: Undead Edition The Complete Sookie Stackhouse Stories			
12.2	Playing Possum	An Apple for the Creature The Complete Sookie Stackhouse Stories			
13	Dead Ever After		May 2013		The final Sookie Stackhouse novel
13.1	The Blue Hereafter	Games Creatures Play The Complete Sookie Stackhouse Stories			
14	After Dead: What Came Next	The World of Sookie Stackhouse	October 29, 2013		
15	Dead But Not Forgotten: Stories from the World of Sookie Stackhouse		November 25, 2014		

=== Harper Connelly series (2005–2009) ===
1. Grave Sight (2005) ISBN 0-425-20568-1
2. Grave Surprise (2006) ISBN 0-425-21203-3
3. An Ice Cold Grave (2007) ISBN 0-425-21729-9
4. Grave Secret (2009) ISBN 0-441-01830-0; ISBN 978-0-441-01830-7

==== Graphic novels ====
1. Grave Sight Part 1 (June 2011) ISBN 1-60690-229-6, 978-1-60690-229-5
2. Grave Sight Part 2 (November 2011) ISBN 1606902393, 978-1606902394
3. Grave Sight Part 3 (March 2012) ISBN 1606902695, 978-1606902691

=== Cemetery Girl series (with Christopher Golden) ===
1. Book One: The Pretenders (2014) ISBN 978-0-857-38908-4.
2. Book Two: Inheritance (2015) ISBN 978-0425256671
3. Book Three: Haunted (2018)

=== Midnight, Texas Trilogy (2014–2016) ===
1. Midnight Crossroad (May 2014)
2. Day Shift (May 2015)
3. Night Shift (May 2016)

=== Gunnie Rose series ===
1. An Easy Death (2018)
2. A Longer Fall (2020)
3. The Russian Cage (2021)
4. The Serpent in Heaven (2022)
5. All the Dead Shall Weep (2023)
6. The Last Wizard's Ball (2025)

=== Stand-alones ===
- Sweet and Deadly (1981) ISBN 0-395-30532-2. Republished in the UK as Dead Dog
- A Secret Rage (1984) ISBN 0-395-35323-8
- Layla Steps Up (2010)
- A Taste of True Blood (2010)
- Indigo (2017)

=== Anthologies and collections ===
Anthology or Collection	Contents	Publication Date	ISBN	Comments
Murder, They Wrote	"Deeply Dead"	1997	ISBN 1-57297-194-0	
Powers of Detection	"Fairy Dust"	Oct 2004		
Night's Edge	"Dancers in the Dark"	Oct 2004	ISBN 0-373-77010-3	
Bite	"One Word Answer"	Sep 2005		
My Big, Fat Supernatural Wedding	Tacky	Oct 2006	ISBN 0-312-34360-4	
Many Bloody Returns	"Dracula Night"	Sep 2007		
Blood Lite	"An Evening with Al Gore"	Oct 2008	ISBN 1-4165-6783-6	
Wolfsbane and Mistletoe	"Gift Wrap"	Oct 2008		
Unusual Suspects	"Lucky"	Dec 2008	ISBN 0-441-01637-5	
Strange Brew	"Bacon"	Jul 2009		
Must Love Hellhounds	"The Britlingens Go to Hell"	Sep 2009		
Sookie Stackhouse 8 Copy Boxed Set	Dead Until Dark Living Dead in Dallas Club Dead Dead to the World Dead as a Doornail Definitely Dead All Together Dead From Dead to Worse	Sep 2009		
Between the Dark and Daylight	"Lucky"	Sep 2009	ISBN 9781606480595	
A Touch of Dead	"Fairy Dust" "Dracula Night" "One Word Answer" "Lucky" "Gift Wrap"	Oct 2009	ISBN 0-441-01197-7	
Crimes by Moonlight	"Dahlia Underground"	Apr 2010	ISBN 9780425235638	
Death's Excellent Vacation	"Two Blondes"	Aug 2010		
Delta Blues	"Crossroads Bargain"	2010	ISBN 1935562061	
Home Improvement: Undead Edition	"If I Had a Hammer"	Aug 2011		
The Sookie Stackhouse Companion	"Small-Town Wedding"	Aug 2011		
An Apple for the Creature	"Playing Possum"	Sep 2012		
Down These Strange Streets	"Death by Dahlia"	Oct/Nov 2011		
The World of Sookie Stackhouse	"After Dead: What Came Next"	Oct 2013		An anthology with interviews, FAQ, recipes, and more
Games Creatures Play	"The Blue Hereafter"	Apr 2014		
Inherit the Dead	"Five"	2014	ISBN 9781451684759	
Urban Allies	"Blood for Blood"	2016		
Matchup	"Dig Here"	2017	ISBN 9781501141591	
The Complete Sookie Stackhouse Stories	"Fairy Dust" (2004) "Dracula Night" (2007) "One Word Answer" (2005) "Lucky" (2008) "Gift Wrap" (2008) "Two Blondes" (2010) "Small-Town Wedding" (2011) "If I Had a Hammer" (2011) "Playing Possum" (2012) "In the Blue Hereafter" (2014)	Nov 2017	ISBN 9780399587597 (hardcover), ISBN 9780399587603 (ebook)	
Heroic Hearts	"The Return of the Mage"	2022		

=== As editor ===
- Many Bloody Returns (September 2007; co-editor with Toni LP Kelner)
- Wolfsbane and Mistletoe (October 2008; co-editor with Toni LP Kelner)
- Crimes by Moonlight (April 2010)
- Death's Excellent Vacation (August 2010; co-editor with Toni LP Kelner)
- Home Improvement: Undead Edition (August 2011; co-editor with Toni LP Kelner)
- An Apple for the Creature (September 2012; co-editor with Toni LP Kelner)

== See also ==
- List of crime writers
- Midnight, Texas—a television series based on the book series
- Romance novel
- Sookie Stackhouse
- Aurora Teagarden
- True Blood
