= List of True Blood episodes =

True Blood is an American television drama series created by Alan Ball for HBO. It is based on The Southern Vampire Mysteries (also known as The Sookie Stackhouse novels) by Charlaine Harris.

The series revolves around Sookie Stackhouse (Anna Paquin), a telepathic waitress who is living in the rural town of Bon Temps, Louisiana two years after the invention of a synthetic blood called Tru Blood that has allowed vampires to "come out of the coffin" and allow their presence to be known to mankind. Now they are struggling for equal rights and assimilation, while anti-vampire organizations begin to gain power. Sookie's world is turned upside down when she falls in love with 173-year-old vampire Bill Compton (Stephen Moyer) and for the first time must navigate the trials, tribulations and terrors of intimacy and relationships. Other characters include Tara Thornton (Rutina Wesley), Sookie's tough-talking best friend, her womanizing brother Jason (Ryan Kwanten), thousand year old vampire and Sheriff of Area 5, Eric Northman (Alexander Skarsgård), and her shape-shifting boss Sam Merlotte (Sam Trammell). True Blood follows a serialized format, with most episodes ending on a cliffhanger that leads directly into the next. Episode titles are taken from the name of a song that appears on the soundtrack of that episode.

During the course of the series, 80 episodes of True Blood aired over seven seasons, between September 7, 2008, and August 24, 2014.

== Series overview ==
Season	Episodes	Originally released	
Season	Episodes	First released	Last released
1	12	September 7, 2008	November 23, 2008
2	12	June 14, 2009	September 13, 2009
3	12	June 13, 2010	September 12, 2010
4	12	June 26, 2011	September 11, 2011
5	12	June 10, 2012	August 26, 2012
6	10	June 16, 2013	August 18, 2013
7	10	June 22, 2014	August 24, 2014

== Episodes ==
=== Season 1 (2008) ===
No. overall	No. in season	Title	Directed by	Written by	Original release date	US viewers (millions)
1	1	"Strange Love"	Alan Ball	Alan Ball	September 7, 2008	1.44
2	2	"The First Taste"	Scott Winant	Alan Ball	September 14, 2008	1.79
3	3	"Mine"	John Dahl	Alan Ball	September 21, 2008	1.81
4	4	"Escape from Dragon House"	Michael Lehmann	Brian Buckner	September 28, 2008	1.82
5	5	"Sparks Fly Out"	Daniel Minahan	Alexander Woo	October 5, 2008	1.74
6	6	"Cold Ground"	Nick Gomez	Raelle Tucker	October 12, 2008	1.67
7	7	"Burning House of Love"	Marcos Siega	Chris Offutt	October 19, 2008	2.10
8	8	"The Fourth Man in the Fire"	Michael Lehmann	Alexander Woo	October 26, 2008	2.07
9	9	"Plaisir d'Amour"	Anthony M. Hemingway	Brian Buckner	November 2, 2008	2.35
10	10	"I Don't Wanna Know"	Scott Winant	Chris Offutt	November 9, 2008	2.39
11	11	"To Love Is to Bury"	Nancy Oliver	Nancy Oliver	November 16, 2008	2.67
12	12	"You'll Be the Death of Me"	Alan Ball	Raelle Tucker	November 23, 2008	2.45

=== Season 2 (2009) ===
No. overall	No. in season	Title	Directed by	Written by	Original release date	US viewers (millions)
13	1	"Nothing But the Blood"	Daniel Minahan	Alexander Woo	June 14, 2009	3.70
14	2	"Keep This Party Going"	Michael Lehmann	Brian Buckner	June 21, 2009	3.41
15	3	"Scratches"	Scott Winant	Raelle Tucker	June 28, 2009	3.70
16	4	"Shake and Fingerpop"	Michael Lehmann	Alan Ball	July 12, 2009	3.90
17	5	"Never Let Me Go"	John Dahl	Nancy Oliver	July 19, 2009	3.85
18	6	"Hard-Hearted Hannah"	Michael Lehmann	Brian Buckner	July 26, 2009	4.00
19	7	"Release Me"	Michael Ruscio	Raelle Tucker	August 2, 2009	4.27
20	8	"Timebomb"	John Dahl	Alexander Woo	August 9, 2009	4.43
21	9	"I Will Rise Up"	Scott Winant	Nancy Oliver	August 16, 2009	4.46
22	10	"New World in My View"	Adam Davidson	Kate Barnow & Elisabeth R. Finch	August 23, 2009	5.33
23	11	"Frenzy"	Daniel Minahan	Alan Ball	August 30, 2009	5.19
24	12	"Beyond Here Lies Nothin'"	Michael Cuesta	Alexander Woo	September 13, 2009	5.11

=== Season 3 (2010) ===
No. overall	No. in season	Title	Directed by	Written by	Original release date	US viewers (millions)
25	1	"Bad Blood"	Daniel Minahan	Brian Buckner	June 13, 2010	5.09
26	2	"Beautifully Broken"	Scott Winant	Raelle Tucker	June 20, 2010	4.26
27	3	"It Hurts Me Too"	Michael Lehmann	Alexander Woo	June 27, 2010	4.46
28	4	"9 Crimes"	David Petrarca	Kate Barnow & Elisabeth R. Finch	July 11, 2010	4.68
29	5	"Trouble"	Scott Winant	Nancy Oliver	July 18, 2010	4.86
30	6	"I Got a Right to Sing the Blues"	Michael Lehmann	Alan Ball	July 25, 2010	4.74
31	7	"Hitting the Ground"	John Dahl	Brian Buckner	August 1, 2010	5.24
32	8	"Night on the Sun"	Lesli Linka Glatter	Raelle Tucker	August 8, 2010	5.09
33	9	"Everything Is Broken"	Scott Winant	Alexander Woo	August 15, 2010	5.00
34	10	"I Smell a Rat"	Michael Lehmann	Kate Barnow & Elisabeth R. Finch	August 22, 2010	5.39
35	11	"Fresh Blood"	Daniel Minahan	Nancy Oliver	August 29, 2010	5.44
36	12	"Evil Is Going On"	Anthony Hemingway	Alan Ball	September 12, 2010	5.38

=== Season 4 (2011) ===
No. overall	No. in season	Title	Directed by	Written by	Original release date	US viewers (millions)
37	1	"She's Not There"	Michael Lehmann	Alexander Woo	June 26, 2011	5.42
38	2	"You Smell Like Dinner"	Scott Winant	Brian Buckner	July 3, 2011	2.90
39	3	"If You Love Me, Why Am I Dyin'?"	David Petrarca	Alan Ball	July 10, 2011	5.04
40	4	"I'm Alive and On Fire"	Michael Lehmann	Nancy Oliver	July 17, 2011	5.10
41	5	"Me and the Devil"	Daniel Minahan	Mark Hudis	July 24, 2011	5.26
42	6	"I Wish I Was the Moon"	Jeremy Podeswa	Raelle Tucker	July 31, 2011	5.19
43	7	"Cold Grey Light of Dawn"	Michael Ruscio	Alexander Woo	August 7, 2011	5.14
44	8	"Spellbound"	Daniel Minahan	Alan Ball	August 14, 2011	5.30
45	9	"Let's Get Out of Here"	Romeo Tirone	Brian Buckner	August 21, 2011	5.53
46	10	"Burning Down the House"	Lesli Linka Glatter	Nancy Oliver	August 28, 2011	5.31
47	11	"Soul of Fire"	Michael Lehmann	Mark Hudis	September 4, 2011	4.39
48	12	"And When I Die"	Scott Winant	Raelle Tucker	September 11, 2011	5.05

=== Season 5 (2012) ===
No. overall	No. in season	Title	Directed by	Written by	Original release date	US viewers (millions)
49	1	"Turn! Turn! Turn!"	Daniel Minahan	Brian Buckner	June 10, 2012	5.20
50	2	"Authority Always Wins"	Michael Lehmann	Mark Hudis	June 17, 2012	4.42
51	3	"Whatever I Am, You Made Me"	David Petrarca	Raelle Tucker	June 24, 2012	4.66
52	4	"We'll Meet Again"	Romeo Tirone	Alexander Woo	July 1, 2012	4.54
53	5	"Let's Boot and Rally"	Michael Lehmann	Angela Robinson	July 8, 2012	4.50
54	6	"Hopeless"	Daniel Attias	Alan Ball	July 15, 2012	4.63
55	7	"In the Beginning"	Michael Ruscio	Brian Buckner	July 22, 2012	4.46
56	8	"Somebody That I Used to Know"	Stephen Moyer	Mark Hudis	July 29, 2012	4.60
57	9	"Everybody Wants to Rule the World"	Daniel Attias	Raelle Tucker	August 5, 2012	4.50
58	10	"Gone, Gone, Gone"	Scott Winant	Alexander Woo	August 12, 2012	4.49
59	11	"Sunset"	Lesli Linka Glatter	Angela Robinson	August 19, 2012	4.93
60	12	"Save Yourself"	Michael Lehmann	Alan Ball	August 26, 2012	5.05

=== Season 6 (2013) ===
No. overall	No. in season	Title	Directed by	Written by	Original release date	US viewers (millions)
61	1	"Who Are You, Really?"	Stephen Moyer	Raelle Tucker	June 16, 2013	4.52
62	2	"The Sun"	Daniel Attias	Angela Robinson	June 23, 2013	4.08
63	3	"You're No Good"	Howard Deutch	Mark Hudis	June 30, 2013	3.94
64	4	"At Last"	Anthony Hemingway	Alexander Woo	July 7, 2013	4.14
65	5	"Fuck the Pain Away"	Michael Ruscio	Angela Robinson	July 14, 2013	4.54
66	6	"Don't You Feel Me"	Howard Deutch	Daniel Kenneth	July 21, 2013	4.47
67	7	"In the Evening"	Scott Winant	Kate Barnow	July 28, 2013	4.36
68	8	"Dead Meat"	Michael Lehmann	Robin Veith	August 4, 2013	4.17
69	9	"Life Matters"	Romeo Tirone	Brian Buckner	August 11, 2013	4.00
70	10	"Radioactive"	Scott Winant	Kate Barnow	August 18, 2013	4.14

=== Season 7 (2014) ===
No. overall	No. in season	Title	Directed by	Written by	Original release date	US viewers (millions)
71	1	"Jesus Gonna Be Here"	Stephen Moyer	Angela Robinson	June 22, 2014	4.03
72	2	"I Found You"	Howard Deutch	Kate Barnow	June 29, 2014	3.06
73	3	"Fire in the Hole"	Lee Rose	Brian Buckner	July 6, 2014	3.20
74	4	"Death Is Not the End"	Gregg Fienberg	Daniel Kenneth	July 13, 2014	3.23
75	5	"Lost Cause"	Howard Deutch	Craig Chester	July 20, 2014	3.57
76	6	"Karma"	Angela Robinson	Angela Robinson	July 27, 2014	3.38
77	7	"May Be the Last Time"	Simon Jayes	Craig Chester	August 3, 2014	3.39
78	8	"Almost Home"	Jesse Warn	Kate Barnow	August 10, 2014	3.34
79	9	"Love Is to Die"	Howard Deutch	Brian Buckner	August 17, 2014	3.56
80	10	"Thank You"	Scott Winant	Brian Buckner	August 24, 2014	4.04

== Minisodes ==
HBO began airing six mini-episodes of Drop of True Blood on April 24, 2010 to lead up to the season three premiere.

No.	Title	Written by	Original release date
1	"Eric & Pam"	Alan Ball	April 24, 2010
Eric and Pam audition new dancers for Fangtasia, and eventually meet Yvetta.
2	"Jessica"	Alan Ball	May 3, 2010
Jessica hunts a local bar/casino when she is approached by a man who senses she has desires. He calls her a dirty whore and preaches to her. Jessica sets his intentions straight with a glamour.
3	"Sookie, Tara & Lafayette"	Alan Ball	May 11, 2010
Sookie receives a gift from Bill, but gets into an argument with Tara when the latter wonders how Bill makes his living. Lafayette intervenes as the argument turns heated.
4	"Sam"	Alan Ball	May 18, 2010
Sam tries to destroy "The God Who Comes" metal bull mask, eventually running it over with his truck and then shifting to his dog form to mark it.
5	"Bill"	Alan Ball	May 25, 2010
While getting ready to meet Sookie for their date, Bill hosts a visit from a jewelry saleswoman (Beth Grant), who has other motivations.
6	"Jason"	Alan Ball	June 2, 2010
Directly after shooting Eggs, Jason runs into the woods. He pleads for divine help to deal with the problem. A creature approaches him which causes him to run off again; the creature is revealed to be a werepanther.

== Ratings ==
True Blood : U.S. viewers per episode (millions)

Season	Episode number											
Season	1	2	3	4	5	6	7	8	9	10	11	12
1	1.44	1.79	1.81	1.82	1.74	1.67	2.10	2.07	2.35	2.39	2.65	2.45
2	3.70	3.41	3.70	3.90	3.85	4.00	4.27	4.43	4.46	5.33	5.19	5.11
3	5.09	4.26	4.46	4.68	4.86	4.74	5.24	5.09	5.00	5.39	5.44	5.38
4	5.42	2.90	5.04	5.10	5.26	5.19	5.14	5.30	5.53	5.31	4.39	5.05
5	5.20	4.42	4.66	4.54	4.50	4.63	4.46	4.60	4.50	4.49	4.93	5.05
6	4.52	4.08	3.94	4.14	4.54	4.47	4.36	4.17	4.00	4.14	–	
7	4.03	3.06	3.20	3.23	3.57	3.38	3.39	3.34	3.56	4.04	–	

Audience measurement performed by Nielsen Media Research

== Specials ==
Title	Original release date	U.S. viewers (millions)
"Farewell to Bon Temps"	June 15, 2014	0.839
The cast and executive producers talk about their time on the series that leads to a special preview of the final season.

== Home video releases ==
Season	Episodes	DVD and Blu-ray release dates			
Season	Episodes	Region 1	Region 2	Region 4	Discs
1	12	May 19, 2009	October 26, 2009	July 1, 2009	5
2	12	May 25, 2010	May 17, 2010	May 19, 2010	5
3	12	May 31, 2011	May 23, 2011	May 18, 2011	5
4	12	May 29, 2012	May 21, 2012	May 23, 2012	5
5	12	May 21, 2013	May 20, 2013	May 22, 2013	5
6	10	June 3, 2014	June 2, 2014	June 4, 2014	4
7	10	November 11, 2014	November 10, 2014	November 12, 2014	4
Total	80	November 11, 2014	November 10, 2014	November 12, 2014	33
