= True Blood season 5 =

True Blood
- Season 5
- DVD cover art
- No. of episodes: 12

Release
- Original network: HBO
- Original release: June 10 – August 26, 2012

Season chronology
- ← Previous; Season 4 Next → Season 6

The fifth season of the HBO supernatural drama series True Blood premiered on June 10, 2012 and features 12 episodes, bringing the series total to 60. It picks up right after the events of season four. It is loosely based on the fifth book in The Southern Vampire Mysteries series, Dead as a Doornail, but incorporates much more of the following books than the previous seasons have.

== Cast and characters ==
=== Main cast ===
- Anna Paquin as Sookie Stackhouse
- Stephen Moyer as Bill Compton
- Sam Trammell as Sam Merlotte
- Ryan Kwanten as Jason Stackhouse
- Rutina Wesley as Tara Thornton
- Alexander Skarsgård as Eric Northman
- Christopher Meloni as Roman Zimojic
- Chris Bauer as Andy Bellefleur
- Kristin Bauer van Straten as Pam Swynford De Beaufort
- Lauren Bowles as Holly Cleary
- Valentina Cervi as Salome Agrippa
- Nelsan Ellis as Lafayette Reynolds
- Scott Foley as Patrick Devins
- Janina Gavankar as Luna Garza
- Lucy Griffiths as Nora Gainesborough
- Todd Lowe as Terry Bellefleur
- Joe Manganiello as Alcide Herveaux
- Michael McMillian as Steve Newlin
- Denis O'Hare as Russell Edgington
- Jim Parrack as Hoyt Fortenberry
- Carrie Preston as Arlene Fowler Bellefleur
- Deborah Ann Woll as Jessica Hamby

=== Special guest cast ===
- Kevin Alejandro as Jesus Velasquez
- William Sanderson as Bud Dearborn
- Alfre Woodard as Ruby Jean Reynolds
- Adina Porter as Lettie Mae Daniels

=== Guest cast ===
- Carolyn Hennesy as Rosalyn Harris
- Peter Mensah as Kibwe Akinjide
- Giles Matthey as Claude Crane
- Dale Dickey as Martha Bozeman
- Louis Herthum as JD Carson
- Christopher Heyerdahl as Dieter Braun
- John Rezig as Deputy Kevin Ellis
- Jamie Gray Hyder as Danielle
- Tina Majorino as Molly
- Kelly Overton as Rikki Naylor
- Chloe Noelle as Emma Garza
- Jessica Clark as Lilith
- Camilla Luddington as Claudette Crane
- Jacob Hopkins as Alexander Drew
- Brendan McCarthy as Nate
- Tanya Wright as Deputy Kenya Jones
- John Billingsley as Mike Spencer
- Emma Greenwell as Claudia Crane
- Robert Patrick as Jackson Herveaux
- Patricia Bethune as Jane Bodehouse
- Tara Buck as Ginger
- Allan Hyde as Godric
- Dale Raoul as Maxine Fortenberry
- Aaron Christian Howles as Rocky Cleary
- Keram Malicki-Sánchez as Elijah Stormer
- Noah Matthews as Wade Cleary
- Alec Gray as Coby Fowler
- Mariana Klaveno as Lorena Krasiki
- Laurel Weber as Lisa Fowler
- Erica Gimpel as Faerie Elder

== Episodes ==
No. overall	No. in season	Title	Directed by	Written by	Original release date	US viewers (millions)
49	1	"Turn! Turn! Turn!"	Daniel Minahan	Brian Buckner	June 10, 2012	5.20
Lafayette and Sookie are in the kitchen with the bodies of Tara and Debbie when Pam appears. Sookie and Pam make a deal: if Pam resurrects and turns Tara, Sookie will help repair Pam's relationship with Eric in addition to "owing her one." Meanwhile, Bill and Eric are arrested by the Vampire Authority for Nan Flanigan's murder, when Nora, Eric's "sister," rescues and hides them. The former Rev. Steve Newlin glamors Jason and declares he's a "Proud Gay American Vampire" and has been in love with Jason ever since he met him, Jason turns him down and is rescued by Jessica before Steve is ready to attack him. Outside Merlotte's, Sam is confronted by Marcus' wolf pack, who take and torture Sam, until Alcide reveals he killed Marcus, not Sam. Meanwhile, Jessica throws a party with the local college students. Jason arrives and becomes jealous of Jessica, and later realizes his friendship with Hoyt will never be the same. Andy hooks up with Holly, but her two sons catch them asleep in bed. Terry's old Marine friend, Patrick, visits a distracted and abrasive Terry, and Arlene is again caught in the emotional crossfire. Alcide asks Sookie to live with him, due to Russell Edgington's escape, but she declines. Eric, Bill and Nora are ambushed and arrested by the Authority. Sookie and Lafayette wait for Pam and Tara to awaken, and are upset when it seems that Tara is dead. Suddenly however, a reanimated Tara pops up and lunges for Sookie.
50	2	"Authority Always Wins"	Michael Lehmann	Mark Hudis	June 17, 2012	4.42
Eric and Bill are locked-up and interrogated at the Vampire Authority headquarters in New Orleans. Meanwhile, Pam recalls her first meeting with Eric, in 1905 San Francisco when she was still human and running a local brothel, when he saved her from a rapist/killer. Alcide turns his back on the traditions of the wolf pack and as Marcus' successor. Steve Newlin wants Jessica to sell Jason to him, but Jessica chastises him for thinking she would give up her friends. Sookie and Lafayette have considerable difficulty keeping the newly turned Tara under control. They manage to get her in Eric's day chamber with silver before the sun rises. However, when the sun falls, Tara wakes up and runs off into the woods. Jason's womanizing comes back to haunt him when he tries to apologize to Hoyt about seducing Jessica, but Hoyt refuses to accept it. Hoyt's overbearing, vampire-phobic mother, Maxine, however, is secretly grateful to Jason for breaking Hoyt up with the vampire Jessica. Emma's grandmother puts a strain on Sam and Luna's relationship because she is certain that Emma will be like her son, an idea Luna rejects but which soon turns out to be true. Eric and Bill propose that the Authority spare their lives in exchange for their assistance in stopping Edgington, the former king and now-reviving fugitive.
51	3	"Whatever I Am, You Made Me"	David Petrarca	Raelle Tucker	June 24, 2012	4.66
In New Orleans, Bill successfully barters with the Authority Chancellors and their leader, Roman, for his and Eric's lives in return for hunting Edgington down again. Roman and his closest confidante, Salome, enlist a new ally, Steve Newlin, to be their new spokesperson in the face of Edgington's return and the emerging threat of The Sanguinista Movement. Meanwhile, Andy's relationship with Holly comes back to bite him, when revealing photos of him are posted by Holly's sons over the Internet. Searching for Tara, Sookie goes to Fangtasia to ask for help, but Pam is still caught up in her memories of the brothel murders back in 1905, when Eric meets Bill for the first time, and when she is turned. Tara turns to Sam for help after feeling betrayed by Sookie and Lafayette for making her a vampire. Later, Andy and Alcide are visited by Debbie's parents who are searching for her. Jason bumps into an old high school teacher, who was his first sexual partner, but their reunion re-enforces his conflicting feelings about himself. When Tara makes a scene at Merlotte's, Sookie finally decides to tell Alcide the truth about Debbie, and Tara attempts to commit suicide in a tanning salon.
52	4	"We'll Meet Again"	Romeo Tirone	Alexander Woo	July 1, 2012	4.54
Eric interrogates Pam regarding Russell's escape to find out what she really knows, and believes her when she says that she didn't tell anyone of Russell's whereabouts. In the encounter, Pam demands to be released, Eric realizes that to ensure his legacy continues on (incase he dies by Russell's hand or the Authority) he decides it's best to release Pam (his only progeny) whereby having no hold or dominion over her and ensure Pam's safety, Eric decides to release Pam. An irate Lafayette unwittingly puts Sookie's life in danger after using his brujo blood to curse her car. Elsewhere, Terry flashes back to a deadly night in Anbar, Iraq, as he and Patrick travel to South Dakota to find their former service buddy, who turns out to be the suspected arsonist. Meanwhile, Pam forces a reluctant Tara to embrace her nature and feed as a vampire. At Authority headquarters, Roman and Salome continue interrogating Nora, and using information from her they find and execute a traitor within the Council. Two of Sam's shifter friends visit and invite him for a run, only to end up mysteriously murdered later that night. In an attempt to protect Sookie, Alcide tells Gordon and Barbara Pelt that Marcus murdered Debbie prior to being killed himself. Bill returns to his home and meets Jessica (who had glamored Andy into forgetting Debbie's murder case). He then decides to visit Sookie, but finds her drowning her sorrows and becoming intimate with Alcide. Meanwhile, Andy and Jason are invited by Judge Covers to a party, only to discover it to be a faerie burlesque, before getting kicked out after Jason learns more about his parents' death.
53	5	"Let's Boot and Rally"	Michael Lehmann	Angela Robinson	July 8, 2012	4.50
Sookie and Alcide are getting intimate, and as they enter her bedroom, Alcide whispers to her that he has been waiting for this for a long time. They are caught off guard by Bill and Eric, who ask Sookie for her help with their search for Russell. She reluctantly agrees, accepting that her life will never be normal. In South Dakota, Patrick and Terry are held hostage in a bunker by their squadmate Brian Eller, who claims to be protecting them from a dying Iraqi woman's ifrit curse. Lafayette, unable to deal with the demon magic inside him, calls out to Jesus' spirit for help, and later wakes up to find Jesus' head on his table with its lips sewn shut. Meanwhile, Jason wakes up from a disturbing dream where his parents are having breakfast with a young Sookie, but vampire marks suddenly appear on their necks. Later, Jason and Andy are sent to investigate the murder of Sam's shifter friends. Sam warns Luna about the attacks but before he leaves, a truck with masked gunmen appear and shoot them, incapacitating both of them, but Emma escapes. Terry realizes Eller is right and persuades him to free them. However, Patrick assaults Eller, believing he's a nutcase. They leave him tied up, but the ifrit appears and kills him. Elsewhere, Tara begins tending the bar on Pam's orders, and Jessica gives her advice on coping with vampirism, but when she later discovers Tara feeding on Hoyt, she attacks her. Sookie uses her faerie powers to discover that a woman from the Vampire Council glamored Alcide's employee and released Russell. This leads Alcide, Eric, Bill, and Sookie to an abandoned hospital where they find humans being used as food, and soon locate a recuperating Russell. But as Eric closes to attack him, Alcide is ambushed from behind.
54	6	"Hopeless"	Daniel Attias	Alan Ball	July 15, 2012	4.63
Wolves attack Eric, Bill and Alcide while Russell attempts to feed on Sookie until she repels him with her powers. Fortunately, the Vampire Authority soldiers appear and take Russell to the Authority -- after Bill and Eric glamor Sookie and Alcide to forget everything -- where they are praised as heroes. At Fangtasia, Tara's fistfight with Jessica over drinking Hoyt's blood ends quickly after Pam intervenes. Meanwhile, Lafayette visits Ruby Jean in the hospital after realizing they both received the same message from Jesus. Sam and Luna are taken to the hospital where Sam tells a frantic Luna that Emma escaped. Just then Emma and Marcus's mother arrive, and Luna accepts that Emma should stay with her until the shifter murders have stopped. Sookie learns more from Jason about their parents' death, and they go to the faerie night club, only to learn her parents died because of her blood. Elsewhere, Sam chooses to help Andy with the shifter murders, and at the specialized weapons store that arms humans against "Supes", Sam saves Andy's life. After sighting the Ifrit, Terry rushes home and explains to Arlene that she is no longer safe with him because of the curse. Alcide returns to challenge J.D. as pack leader. Eric and Bill realize that either Nora or Salome must have dug up Russell. As the Authority gathers to witness Russell's execution via iStake, the device fails to operate, and Russell suddenly kills Roman with the Judas tree stake.
55	7	"In the Beginning"	Michael Ruscio	Brian Buckner	July 22, 2012	4.46
Russell is soon subdued, and Salome reveals to everyone at Authority where her true allegiances lie, admitting she was the one who dug up Russell's grave after following Eric and Bill, and that Nora was her patsy to divert suspicion away from her. Meanwhile, Alcide prepares for a fight with J.D. for leadership of the pack, and rejects the idea of using V. At Fangtasia, Tara, now a dancer at the club, is visited by her estranged mother, Lettie Mae, who quickly disowns her for being a vampire. Hoyt finds a new group of friends, the vigilante "haters" hunting down non-humans. Elsewhere, Lafayette travels to Mexico to search for Jesus' body but ends up getting held hostage by Jesus' uncle. Bill, Eric, Nora, and The Chancellors, now under Salome's lead, drink the sacred blood of Lilith. In Bon Temps, Sookie considers life without fey powers: after discovering they are finite, she decides to drain them on the night sky. After a fight with Jessica over his parents, Jason runs towards the light in the sky emitted by Sookie. At the hospital, Sam locates one of the shooters after catching his scent. The head vampires, now on a blood-induced high, crash a private wedding party on Bourbon Street and feast on all of the humans present. Soon a naked hallucinatory Lilith appears, and seems pleased with the vampiric orgy. Godric then appears in a ghostly vision to Eric, telling him that he knows what he is doing is wrong, but since his sister does not he must save her.
56	8	"Somebody That I Used to Know"	Stephen Moyer	Mark Hudis	July 29, 2012	4.60
An emotional Luna escapes from the hospital after morphing into Sam and she cannot change back, and Sam continues to help Andy try to find the vigilantes. At Authority headquarters, the Chancellors revel in the afterglow of the recent events. Bill is shaken by a century-old memory of his dying daughter when he is persuaded by Salome to feed on a young mother. However, Eric sobers after his message from Godric, but Nora will not back away from her newly found dogma. Helped by Claude and his faerie sisters, Sookie and Jason visit the site of their parents' deaths in an attempt to learn the identity of the killer. Meanwhile, Tara has a run-in at Fangtasia with an old high school rival, whom Pam glamors to be Tara's personal blood bank. Hoyt's new friends bring him a present: Jessica, whom they try to persuade him to kill. Hoyt instead frees her and refuses to associate with her any more. Elsewhere, Lafayette returns home from Mexico, and Arlene and Holly pay him to lead a séance, during which the dead Iraqi woman demands the death of either Terry or Patrick. Also, J.D. increases the stakes of his fight with Alcide when he decides their prey will be a college athlete. Alcide, while protecting the man, loses his right to leadership, and is saved from death by pack matriarch Martha. In the war against mainstreamers, Bill proposes destroying all five Tru Blood-producing factories, telling Eric that he is "evolving."
57	9	"Everybody Wants to Rule the World"	Daniel Attias	Raelle Tucker	August 5, 2012	4.50
At Authority Headquarters Eric continues to plot to save Nora from herself, and news of the bombings of Tru Blood factories arrives. Sookie, with the help of Lafayette, receives a clue from the ghost of her deceased grandmother connecting the retired Bon Temps Sheriff Bud Dearborne to the investigation of her parents' deaths. Meanwhile, Andy and Jason brutally interrogate their prisoner. They discover, via a hater website, the existence of "the dragon", the hater leader, and suspect that Bud is the mastermind behind the shifter murders. Sookie goes to Bud's house to investigate but is assaulted and held captive in a pigpen with Hoyt. Elsewhere, Alcide reflects on his new life as a "lone wolf", and Russell goes to the pack gathering and takes Emma as part of the cost of his patronage. In Fangtasia, Pam refuses to be spooked by the Tru Blood crisis, but is angered by the arrival of a new vampire sheriff named Elijah. Also, Terry confronts and fights Patrick, and kills him with Arlene's help, and his body is then claimed by the Ifrit as payment of the blood debt. Andy and Jason track Bud and his girlfriend, the hater leader, down to his farm and, aided by Sam, shoot him in time to save the drugged Sookie and Hoyt from being eaten by the swine. At Authority Headquarters, Eric attempts to kidnap Nora, but is discovered and captured after Bill betrays him to Salome.
58	10	"Gone, Gone, Gone"	Scott Winant	Alexander Woo	August 12, 2012	4.49
As the Tru Blood shortage crisis continues, Molly is iStaked with her own creation, and Steve Newlin goes on the air to spin the story in favor of the American Vampire League. Hoyt decides to head off to work in Alaska, much to his mothers chagrin, and asks Jessica to glamour him to forget her and Jason. Sookie survives another attack in her home, and with Jason's help they find a mysterious scroll under the floorboard of her bed. Meanwhile, Nora and Bill "persuade" Eric to believe in Lilith after she appears then destroys Godric. Sam and Luna track Steve to a news station, and sneak into the AVL in mouse form to try to find Emma. Tara, rejecting the directive to create 30 new baby-vampires or lose the bar, tricks and beheads the new sheriff. Bill summons Jessica to the bunker and asks her to read the vampire bible with an open mind. Russell, now romantically linked to Steve, goes on a killing spree, then defects from the Authority over his dream of walking in the sun by drinking fey blood. Unable to read the document, Sookie and Jason go to the fey haven and learn from a 500-year-old faerie that the document is actually a contract written on 5 August 1702 by John William Stackhouse, promising the first fey-bearing heir of the Stackhouse clan to Mr. M. Warlow, the vampire who killed their parents.
59	11	"Sunset"	Lesli Linka Glatter	Angela Robinson	August 19, 2012	4.93
As a result of vampire nesting behavior, Bill slips further into his religious fervor, receiving visions from Lilith commanding him to drink all of her blood. Nora begins to doubt the true religion and re-connects with Eric, and Bill orders Jessica to turn Jason into a vampire, but she escapes. Armed with evidence of the Authority's hand in the recent factory bombings and of Russell and Steve killing 22 college students, a U.S. military commander visits the Authority with an ultimatum to return to the agreed policy of mainstreaming, but this backfires when Eric suddenly murders the general. Eric and Nora then leave, on the pretext of needing to glamour parts of the military to get back the video evidence, but they kill their minders and fly away. Meanwhile, Pam takes the fall for Tara's murder of the new vampire sheriff and is taken with Jessica to the Authority. At the faerie sanctuary Sookie meets the "information overloaded" elder just as Alcide reconnects with his estranged father and they defend themselves against baby-vamps. Sam and Luna search the Authority to try to rescue Emma, but they are captured and locked up with other naked humans. After having similar visions, each chancellor of the Authority believes they are the one chosen by Lilith. Russell captures and glamors Jason to take him and Steve to the sanctuary. In the euphoria of the fey-scent, Russell battles then drains the faerie elder, leaving the haven unprotected.
60	12	"Save Yourself"	Michael Lehmann	Alan Ball	August 26, 2012	5.05
As Russell closes in for the kill, Eric stakes him and saves the faeries. Sookie runs out to check on Jason, and Eric holds Nora back from her intoxicating scent. Jason, suffering a concussion, sees his parents' images everywhere. Along with Nora and Tara, Eric persuades Sookie to assist them in overthrowing the Authority. Back in Bon Temps, Andy is forced by the pregnant Maurella to deliver her quadruplet half-faerie babies with assistance from Holly. Meanwhile, Luna skinwalks as Steve to rescue Emma and announces the Authority's crimes to the world on-air. Sam flies inside Chancellor Rosalyn and shifts, killing her. Alcide, with the help of some powerful vampire blood he got from his father, kills J.D. and takes over as leader of the pack, promising a return to pack basics. Sookie, Eric, Nora, Tara, and Jason assault the Authority complex and kill all of the guards in a huge bloodbath. Sookie and Tara free Pam and Jessica from the holding cells, where the reunited Pam and Tara share a passionate kiss. Bill, in his scheming blood-lust, tricks Salome into drinking blood laced with silver, and stakes her. Sookie and Eric arrive and try to reason with him, but he eulogises Lilith and drinks the vial of blood. His body soon dissolves into a pool of blood, only to reform as a powerful, Lilith-like vampire. Eric screams for Sookie to run.

== Production ==
True Blood was officially renewed for a fifth season on August 11, 2011.

In February, 2012 it was announced that creator Alan Ball would be stepping down as showrunner at the end of the fifth season. Ball will continue on as executive producer in a more advisory role and leave the day-to-day production of the series to others. "Because of the fantastic cast, writers, producers and crew, with whom I have been lucky enough to work these past five years, I know I could step back and the show will continue to thrive," said Ball in a statement.

Series co-star Stephen Moyer made his directorial debut with the eighth episode of season five, titled "Somebody That I Used to Know." D.E.B.S. writer/director and former The L Word producer Angela Robinson has joined the writing staff. She wrote episodes five and eleven.

Series co-star Rutina Wesley confirmed that the character Tara would be returning.

== Ratings ==
Episode number (Production number)	Title	Original air date	Ratings share (Adults 18–49)	Viewers (in millions)	Rank per week on Cable
49 (5.01)	"Turn! Turn! Turn!"	June 10, 2012	2.9	5.20	#10
50 (5.02)	"Authority Always Wins"	June 17, 2012	2.6	4.42	#11
51 (5.03)	"Whatever I Am, You Made Me"	June 24, 2012	2.6	4.66	#10
52 (5.04)	"We'll Meet Again"	July 1, 2012	2.6	4.54	#11
53 (5.05)	"Let's Boot and Rally"	July 8, 2012	2.6	4.50	#7
54 (5.06)	"Hopeless"	July 15, 2012	2.7	4.63	#11
55 (5.07)	"In the Beginning"	July 22, 2012	2.6	4.46	#9
56 (5.08)	"Somebody That I Used to Know"	July 29, 2012	2.6	4.60	#9
57 (5.09)	"Everybody Wants to Rule the World"	August 5, 2012	2.7	4.50	#4
58 (5.10)	"Gone, Gone, Gone"	August 12, 2012	2.6	4.49	#3
59 (5.11)	"Sunset"	August 19, 2012	2.8	4.93	#6
60 (5.12)	"Save Yourself"	August 26, 2012	2.8	5.05	#3
