= True Blood season 4 =

True Blood
- Season 4
- DVD cover art
- No. of episodes: 12

Release
- Original network: HBO
- Original release: June 26 – September 11, 2011

Season chronology
- ← Previous; Season 3 Next → Season 5

The fourth season of the television series True Blood contains 12 episodes, bringing the series total to 48. The season premiered on June 26, 2011. Though the storyline picks up twelve and a half months after the events of season three; the season still begins immediately after final scene of "Evil Is Going On". It is loosely based on the fourth novel in The Southern Vampire Mysteries series, Dead to the World.

== Episodes ==
No. overall	No. in season	Title	Directed by	Written by	Original release date	US viewers (millions)
37	1	"She's Not There"	Michael Lehmann	Alexander Woo	June 26, 2011	5.42
The fourth season begins after Sookie is transported to the faerie world, where she is reunited with her grandfather, Earl. She quickly learns that the fairies have lied to her and that she, and possibly other humans, are in danger. Sookie manages to escape back to Bon Temps and discovers that she has been missing for a year. Jason, who has become a police officer, has sold her house to a mystery buyer. Sookie hires Portia Bellefleur, Sheriff Andy's lawyer sister, to buy back her house from the buyer. Andy has become addicted to V, which only Jason knows. Meanwhile, Bill and Eric work the media to win back human public opinion after the Russell Edgington incident. Jessica learns that living with a human may not be such a good idea as Hoyt continues to rely on her to cook and clean for him while he is at work. Bill has deposed the Queen of Louisiana and become its king. Lafayette's new love interest Jesus takes Lafayette to a witch's coven meeting. The coven's leader, Marnie, soon takes a keen interest in him. Arlene's baby displays disturbing traits. Sam has become friends with a group of shapeshifters. After town-hopping for a year, Tara has settled into a life in New Orleans as a cage-fighter named Toni and is romantically involved with a fellow fighter, Naomi. Jason returns to the Hotshot commune, of which he is now sole guardian since Crystal's disappearance, but he is betrayed and locked in a freezer. At the end, Eric visits Sookie and reveals that he bought her house in order to own her: he declares that she is his.
38	2	"You Smell Like Dinner"	Scott Winant	Brian Buckner	July 3, 2011	2.90
Eric tries to persuade Sookie to become his. Sookie visits Bill for help in dealing with Eric, only to find out that Bill has become King of Louisiana. A flashback reveals that Bill first met Nan Flanagan of the AVL in 1982 England, and on its orders infiltrated the Queendom of Louisiana and arranged for the execution of the previous monarch, Sophie-Anne Leclerq, by AVL snipers. Back in the present, Bill tells Sookie there is nothing he can do to stop Eric. Tara returns to Bon Temps and pays Sookie a visit, but Sookie soon leaves for Fangtasia to seek Pam's advice, angry that Eric has altered her house. Meanwhile, Tara joins Lafayette and Jesus as they attend another witches' meeting, where Marnie announces she plans to resurrect a human. Eric, on Bill's orders, tells Marnie to dissolve her witch coven. As she refuses and Eric attacks her, she is taken over by a strange entity and successfully curses Eric into losing his memory. In Fangtasia, Sookie encounters Jessica feeding on someone who isn't Hoyt. In Hotshot, Felton and Crystal Norris tell Jason of their intentions to turn him into a werepanther so he can breed for their community. Sam's romantic interest in fellow shapeshifter Luna grows as she reveals she is able to shift into another human. Sam's manipulative younger brother Tommy speaks of mending their bond. On her way home from Fangtasia, Sookie comes across Eric walking down the street with no shirt, no shoes and no memory.
39	3	"If You Love Me, Why Am I Dyin'?"	David Petrarca	Alan Ball	July 10, 2011	5.04
Jason is being kept alive by Crystal as a potential werepanther breeder. Pam asks Sookie to hide the amnesiac Eric from the witches at her house, and she reluctantly agrees. Afterwards, Sookie visits Alcide, now living in Shreveport with Debbie Pelt, and asks him to house Eric for her. Debbie tells Sookie she wants to make amends for trying to kill her. Andy, high on V, gets into an altercation with Sam outside Merlotte's. Meanwhile, Portia Bellefleur propositions Bill. Jessica confesses to Hoyt that she has fed on another man and then glamors him into forgetting about it. Jessica gives Arlene's baby the creepy doll that keeps showing up in their house. Lafayette goes to Fangtasia to beg forgiveness from Eric. Tara and Jesus follow him and find Pam threatening him in the basement dungeon. Pam demands that they bring Marnie, the coven leader, to Fangtasia within 24 hours. Marnie performs a ritual for the spirit to possess her body so that she may be an instrument of its power. Elsewhere, Jason wakes to find Crystal raping him, while other female werepanthers are watching or waiting their turn. Tommy forges a scheme to defraud his guardian Maxine Fortenberry. At the climax, Claudine shows up at Sookie's house and tells her to return to the faerie realm. Sookie refuses, and Eric attacks Claudine and drinks her to death.
40	4	"I'm Alive and On Fire"	Michael Lehmann	Nancy Oliver	July 17, 2011	5.10
Eric becomes drunk on Claudine's faerie blood and runs away from Sookie: he is able to daywalk in sunlight well into the daylight hours and takes a swim in a lake. Sookie enlists Alcide's help in finding Eric. Meanwhile, Jason escapes from Hotshot, pursued by werepanthers. He kills Felton and runs away from Crystal, and eventually collapses next to a highway where he is discovered by Hoyt and Jessica, who gives Jason some of her blood to help heal his wounds. Nan Flanagan tells Bill that she does not believe the witches pose any real danger. Bill discovers that Portia Bellefleur is his descendant and ends their relationship. Meanwhile, Marnie is possessed by a witch named Antonia, whom she sees in a vision burned at the stake centuries ago. Lafayette, Jesus and Tara urge Marnie to reverse the amnesia spell she has put on Eric. When Pam gets fed up with Marnie's slow progress in reversing the spell, she threatens her; Marnie is once again taken over by the witch's spirit and curses Pam, causing the flesh on her face to begin to decay. Elsewhere, Arlene and Terry are frightened when their baby appears to write "baby not yours" on a wall. Sookie refuses to let Bill into her home to search for Eric. Also, Sam learns that Luna's ex-husband, the father of her child, is a jealous werewolf. Tommy goes to see his mother, but his evil father prevents him from leaving so that he can be used for dog-fighting again.
41	5	"Me and the Devil"	Daniel Minahan	Mark Hudis	July 24, 2011	5.26
Tommy fights his devious father, Joe Lee, and manages to kill him, but accidentally kills his mother, Melinda, as well during the struggle. Sam helps Tommy dispose of their bodies in a swamp. Eric dreams that his maker, Godric, forces him to drink Sookie's blood, but Eric vows not to hurt Sookie. Meanwhile, Bill glamors Portia into making her afraid of him, in order to put an end to her romantic advances for good. Naomi discovers Tara's real name and confronts her over the phone over why she lied to her about her entire life. Tara discovers that Eric is staying with Sookie and reels off a list of Eric's crimes against Sookie before running away. Eric leaves, guilt-ridden, but Sookie calls him back and the two kiss. Before the night of the full moon, Jason has erotic dreams about Jessica, in which Hoyt also appears. Elsewhere, Arlene and Terry have Reverend Daniels cleanse their house of ghosts, but paranormal activity still lingers as they fear that the evil entity is in Arlene's baby. Alcide is visited by Marcus Bozeman, the head of the local wolf pack, who scolds him for not having registered with them. Also, Lafayette and Jesus travel to Mexico to visit Jesus' witchcraft-practicing grandfather to ask for his help to combat the threat posed by Pam and Eric. Sookie's dead grandmother's spirit warns her that Marnie is dangerous and cannot be trusted. Marnie is later arrested by Bill, who glamours her to find out if her powers are genuine. At the end, Bill meets with the four vampire sheriffs of Louisiana and they discuss the persecution of witches by vampires in Spain in the 1600s. Pam accidentally tells them that Eric has lost his memory, and that he is staying with Sookie.
42	6	"I Wish I Was the Moon"	Jeremy Podeswa	Raelle Tucker	July 31, 2011	5.19
Bill has Eric arrested and, using the excuse that necromancers may use him as a weapon against vampires, gets the Vampire League's permission to sentence him to the "true death"; he later decides to release him when Eric appeals to Bill's love for Sookie. Meanwhile, Arlene and Terry's house catches on fire while they are sleeping: Arlene panics when she can't find Mikey, but he and the mysterious doll are already outside the house. The baby is able to see Mavis, an enigmatic woman waving at him from a distance. Jason fears that he may turn into a werepanther on the night of the full moon, but Sookie finds out from Alcide that you can be a 'were' only if you were born of one. Debbie registers with the local pack without telling Alcide. In Mexico, Jesus' grandfather tells Jesus and Lafayette that they must find him a sacrifice. They find a rattlesnake, and Jesus' grandfather makes the snake bite Jesus, but Lafayette is able to heal him when the spirit of "Tio Luca" enters his body. While imprisoned, Marnie is once again possessed by the spirit of the powerful witch Antonia, and turns on her vampire captor, the same vampire who had raped and fed on Antonia many centuries ago. Tara's girlfriend, Naomi, shows up in Bon Temps and they rekindle their romance after Tara finally comes clean about herself. Pam's face continues to rot. She later shows up at Merlotte's and attacks Tara and Naomi in a fit of rage. Tommy - who has gained the ability to shift into other people due to killing his mother - shapeshifts into Sam, fires Sookie, and has sex with Luna. The real Sam later finds Tommy passed out in Sam's trailer. Sookie, while out in the woods looking for Jason, runs into Eric, and they have sex for the first time outside by the light of the full moon.
43	7	"Cold Grey Light of Dawn"	Michael Ruscio	Alexander Woo	August 7, 2011	5.14
Antonia escapes by controlling the vampire Luis, who tells Bill that she is planning a resurrection. Bill has his vampires flee Louisiana, but those who are staying should bind themselves in silver during the day. Alcide and Debbie join Marcus's pack; they check for Sookie, but discover she is having sex with Eric in the woods. Pam fights Tara and Naomi but retreats when she is filmed by bystanders. At Fangtasia, she undergoes skin surgery from Dr. Ludwig. After sending Naomi back to New Orleans, Tara meets Antonia, who persuades her to join her circle to wage war on vampires; she recruits Holly. Don Bartolo, Jesus's grandfather, reveals that he performed the snake ritual to demonstrate Lafayette's ability as a medium: Tio Luca, the spirit that entered Lafayette, was Jesus's uncle. After Sam and Luna realize that Tommy shapeshifted into Sam, he kicks Tommy out. While Terry and Arlene argue about bringing Mikey to work, Lafayette spots a woman spirit singing to Mikey. Antonia and the witches gather and cast a spell to bring the vampires to the sunlight. While Bill and Eric struggle with the chains, Jessica frees herself, and after killing the guard, opens the front door.
44	8	"Spellbound"	Daniel Minahan	Alan Ball	August 14, 2011	5.30
Jason saves Jessica from the sunlight. Bill offers to meet with Antonia to negotiate a peace between the witches and vampires. Sookie and Eric feed on each other, and then pledge their support to Bill. Lafayette is possessed by Mavis, the spirit woman responsible for Arlene and Terry's problems, and kidnaps Mikey. Marcus, who is revealed as the father of Luna's daughter, threatens Sam when he finds them at Luna's house. After Hoyt and Jessica break up, Jessica is shocked when Jason banishes her from his place. Tommy, skinwalking as Maxine Fortenberry, gets money from a businessman by selling Maxine's natural gas rights. At midnight, Bill proposes that Marnie reverse the spells cast on Eric and Pam and leave the vampires alone and, in return, the vampires will never harm her again. However, when Sookie senses that Marnie is casting a spell, the vampires and witches fight in a cloud of fog. Sookie is injured by a stray bullet to her abdomen, but Alcide rescues her. Eric runs into Marnie, who casts another spell on him.
45	9	"Let's Get Out of Here"	Romeo Tirone	Brian Buckner	August 21, 2011	5.53
Alcide takes the severely wounded Sookie to her house, where Bill gives her his blood. Unconscious, she dreams about having both Eric and Bill in her life. Marnie has cast a spell on Eric which puts him under her control. Lafayette, still possessed by Mavis's spirit, takes Mikey to Hoyt's house (Mavis's house when she was alive) and kicks him out. Jason and Andy go to Hoyt's to recover Mikey, and Lafayette threatens to shoot them with Andy's stolen gun. Jesus arrives and is able to convince Mavis that Mikey is not hers and that her baby is dead. They find the bodies of both Mavis and her baby buried in Hoyt's yard. Mavis's spirit leaves Lafayette's body. Debbie offers to help Sookie get Eric back. Meanwhile, Sam and Luna and her daughter go camping. When Luna's daughter Emma is asleep, Sam and Luna make love. Alcide tells Marcus that he wishes to rise in the pack hierarchy to please Debbie. Marcus goes to Merlotte's and tells Tommy that he wishes to meet Sam at night. Tommy, skinwalking as Sam, goes to meet Marcus. Tommy (as Sam) tells Marcus that he did not touch Luna, but that his brother did. In a jealous rage, Marcus has some wolves beat up Tommy, but Alcide puts an end to the fighting and takes the unconscious Tommy, now back in his true form, home. Jason goes to Bill's mansion and gives Jessica a box of her belongings from Hoyt. He and Jessica have sex in the back of his truck. Debbie goes to Marnie's hideout and distracts her while Sookie finds Eric and discovers Marnie's plans to use Eric to kill Bill. Sookie and Debbie escape and go to find Bill at the Festival of Tolerance in Shreveport, where Marnie/Antonia uses Eric and some other bewitched vampires to attack Bill, kill humans, and create chaos in an effort to discredit the vampires.
46	10	"Burning Down the House"	Lesli Linka Glatter	Nancy Oliver	August 28, 2011	5.31
The violence at the Festival of Tolerance comes to an end when Sookie breaks the spell cast on Eric and restores his memory by using her faerie special powers. Jason wants Jessica to glamor him into forgetting they had sex so he won't accidentally hurt Hoyt by telling him about it. Tommy dies from his injuries, and Sam goes after Marcus and his friends for vengeance. Meanwhile, Bill tells Nan Flanagan that he intends to kill Marnie at the Moon Goddess Emporium, and Sookie worries that Tara will die in the fighting. Pam is also apparently freed from her own curse by Sookie who worries about Eric and about their future, now that he has his memory back. Terry finally discovers Andy is on V and tries to help him overcome his addiction by appealing to their lifelong relationship and by taking him to an old clubhouse in the woods. Marcus and Debbie begin to get closer. Marnie and Antonia have a conversation about their goals, and Marnie convinces Antonia to continue to possess her so they can work together to kill all vampires. Jesus wants to save Marnie. Jesus, Lafayette, Jason and Sookie stand across the street from Marnie's lair, where Sookie is able to eavesdrop on Marnie. Marnie has cast a spell of protection around her headquarters, but Jesus is able to penetrate the boundary of fire, turning into a demon to do so. Once inside, Jesus realizes that Marnie herself is the true danger and transmits his thoughts to Sookie. Holly and Tara work to cast a spell so they can escape from Marnie. They do so, but Marnie spots them and casts a spell on them, causing Holly, Tara, Lafayette and Sookie to go up in flames and disappear, leaving Jason alone outside. At the end, Bill, Eric, Jessica and Pam march on the Moon Goddess Emporium, aiming to destroy Marnie.
47	11	"Soul of Fire"	Michael Lehmann	Mark Hudis	September 4, 2011	4.39
Trapped inside the Moon Goddess Emporium, Sookie and her friends are held captive by Marnie. Marnie kills Casey, one of the members of her coven, maintaining she was attacking her. Antonia attempts to leave Marnie's body, but Marnie binds her to her with a spell. Bill and the other vampires abort their attack on the Moon Goddess Emporium when they discover Sookie is inside as a captive. Marnie strikes a deal with the vampires to free Sookie: their lives for hers. Bill and Eric are on the point of killing each other for Sookie's release when Pam fires a rocket at Marnie which is blocked by the barrier. Jason is severely injured, but Jessica gives him her blood again to heal him. As Marnie and her coven begin casting a spell to prevent their deaths, it controls the vampires outside: they begin walking into the barrier, which would bring the True Death, but the spell is broken by Sookie discharging her special powers. Jesus and Lafayette harness the energy in Casey's body to give Jesus enough power to cast a spell which successfully breaks the bond between Marnie and Antonia. Bill and Eric rush inside the Emporium and kill Roy, another member of the coven, and Marnie. Meanwhile, Sam and Alcide track down Marcus and Emma at Alcide's home, where Marcus is attempting to seduce Debbie. In the fighting that follows, Alcide kills Marcus. Alcide ends his relationship with Debbie. Also, Andy has a romantic interlude with a faerie named Maurella on his way home. As Lafayette begins to fall asleep that night, Marnie's spirit possesses his body.
48	12	"And When I Die"	Scott Winant	Raelle Tucker	September 11, 2011	5.05
In the fourth season finale, as Bon Temps celebrates Halloween, Marnie's spirit possesses Lafayette's body and kills Jesus to take control of his magic powers. Sookie and Sam make up and Sookie gets her job back at his bar-restaurant. Alcide asks Sookie to be with him and have a normal life together. Sookie, Tara and Holly find Bill and Eric being held captive by Marnie who has tied them to stakes to burn both of them alive. After Antonia and other spirits, including Adele Stackhouse, rise from the dead and persuade Marnie to let go, they lead Marnie to the afterlife and everything is resolved. Adele tells Sookie that being alone isn't a bad thing. Meanwhile, Terry receives an unexpected visit from an old friend, a marine named Patrick. Rene's spirit appears to Arlene to warn her that the ghosts of Terry's past will not stay buried forever: Patrick is not what he appears to be and cannot be trusted, and Rene also tells Arlene to "run." Pam admits that she is jealous of Sookie. Luna and Sam have a funeral for Tommy where Maxine is the only mourner. Holly and Andy begin to get closer. Sookie tells Eric and Bill that she loves them both but cannot choose between them, so she chooses to be alone. Jason tells Hoyt that he slept with Jessica, after which Hoyt beats him up. Afterward, Jessica shows up at Jason's place dressed as Red Riding Hood where they have sex again, but she tells him that she doesn't want a relationship, only sex. Just after she leaves, the thought-to-be-dead Steve Newlin appears at Jason's door as a vampire. After an outing with Luna and Emma, Sam finds himself confronted by a werewolf. Alcide discovers that Russell Edgington's cement grave in a parking garage is empty: somebody or something dug him out. Nan Flanagan tells Eric and Bill that she has been fired as spokesperson of the AVL and wants to start a mutiny against the Authority. She also tells them she knows that Sookie is part faerie. Bill deals her the True Death and Eric kills her guards to protect Sookie's secret. In the final scene, a jealous and strung-out Debbie breaks into Sookie's house and tries to kill her with a shotgun. Trying to save Sookie, Tara pushes her out of the way and is shot by Debbie. Sookie wrestles the shotgun away from Debbie and uses it to kill her. Sookie cradles Tara's body, screaming for help.

== Production ==
Filming for season four commenced in Los Angeles, California, on December 1, 2010.

As a special promotional broadcast, the season's second episode "You Smell Like Dinner" was made available on HBO Go a week earlier than usual. This, combined with the 4th of July holiday, is theorized to account for the dramatic decline in ratings for that particular episode.

The series hit record high ratings with episode 9 of season 4, titled "Let's Get Out of Here". The episode drew 5.53 million viewers, making it the most watched episode of True Blood to date.

== Cast and characters ==
=== Main cast ===
- Anna Paquin as Sookie Stackhouse
- Stephen Moyer as Bill Compton
- Sam Trammell as Sam Merlotte
- Ryan Kwanten as Jason Stackhouse
- Rutina Wesley as Tara Thornton
- Alexander Skarsgård as Eric Northman
- Kevin Alejandro as Jesus Velasquez
- Marshall Allman as Tommy Mickens
- Chris Bauer as Andy Bellefleur
- Kristin Bauer van Straten as Pamela Swynford De Beaufort
- Lauren Bowles as Holly Cleary
- Nelsan Ellis as Lafayette Reynolds
- Janina Gavankar as Luna Garza
- Todd Lowe as Terry Bellefleur
- Joe Manganiello as Alcide Herveaux
- Jim Parrack as Hoyt Fortenberry
- Carrie Preston as Arlene Fowler Bellefleur
- Fiona Shaw as Marnie Stonebrook
- Jessica Tuck as Nan Flanagan
- Deborah Ann Woll as Jessica Hamby

=== Special Guest cast ===
- Brit Morgan as Debbie Pelt
- Lois Smith as Adele Stackhouse
- Adina Porter as Lettie Mae Daniels
- Evan Rachel Wood as Sophie-Anne Leclerq
- Gary Cole as Earl Stackhouse

=== Recurring cast ===
- Dean Chekvala as Roy
- Fiona Dourif as Casey
- Paola Turbay as Antonia Gavilán de Logroño
- Dale Raoul as Maxine Fortenberry
- Courtney Ford as Portia Bellefleur
- Vedette Lim as Naomi
- Brendan McCarthy as Nate
- Chloe Noelle as Emma Garza
- Alexandra Breckenridge as Katerina Pelham
- Nondumiso Tembe as Mavis
- Tara Buck as Ginger
- Dane DeHaan as Timbo
- Alec Gray as Coby Fowler
- Lindsay Pulsipher as Crystal Norris
- James Harvey Ward as Felton Norris
- Laurel Weber as Lisa Fowler
- Del Zamora as Don Bartolo
- Chris Butler as Emory
- J. Smith-Cameron as Melinda Mickens
- Christina Moore as Susanne McKittrick
- Lara Pulver as Claudine
- Chris Coy as Barry Horowitz
- Scott Foley as Patrick Devins
- Katherine Helmond as Caroline Bellefleur
- Neil Hopkins as Claude
- Allan Hyde as Godric
- Michael McMillian as Reverend Steve Newlin
- Michael Raymond-James as Rene Lenier
- John Rezig as Deputy Kevin Ellis
- Rebecca Wisocky as Queen Mab

=== Casting ===
On November 8, 2010, Deadline reported that Irish stage actress/director Fiona Shaw (best known in the United States for her role as Aunt Petunia in the Harry Potter films) had been cast as Marnie, an insecure and timid palm reader who is possessed by the spirit of a powerful witch. Former Dexter star Courtney Ford has been cast in the recurring role of Portia Bellefleur, sister to Andy. Actor Dane DeHaan (In Treatment) has also been cast as Timbo. On November 23, Deadline reported that actress Jessica Tuck, who portrays vampire spokesperson Nan Flanagan, will be promoted to series regular starting this season. Three new female cast members were announced: Janina Gavankar (The L Word, The Gates) will play a public school teacher named Luna, who is also a shapeshifter; Alexandra Breckenridge (Life Unexpected, Family Guy) will play a wiccan named Katie; and relative newcomer Vedette Lim will play Naomi, a fierce cage fighter. Daniel Buran will play Marcus, the pack master of the Shreveport werewolves and Alcide's superior and, as in the previous season, Allan Hyde will reprise his role as Godric. Gary Cole (Office Space, Harvey Birdman, Attorney at Law) will play Earl Stackhouse.

== Ratings ==
Episode number (Production number)	Title	Original air date	Ratings share (Adults 18–49)	Viewers (in millions)	Rank per week on Cable
37 (4.01)	"She's Not There"	June 26, 2011	3.0	5.42	#2
38 (4.02)	"You Smell Like Dinner"	July 3, 2011	1.5	2.90	N/A
39 (4.03)	"If You Love Me, Why Am I Dyin'?"	July 10, 2011	2.8	5.04	#2
40 (4.04)	"I'm Alive and On Fire"	July 17, 2011	2.7	5.10	#11
41 (4.05)	"Me and the Devil"	July 24, 2011	2.8	5.26	#8
42 (4.06)	"I Wish I Was the Moon"	July 31, 2011	2.8	5.19	#8
43 (4.07)	"Cold Grey Light of Dawn"	August 7, 2011	2.9	5.14	#14
44 (4.08)	"Spellbound"	August 14, 2011	3.1	5.30	#8
45 (4.09)	"Let's Get Out of Here"	August 21, 2011	3.1	5.53	#4
46 (4.10)	"Burning Down the House"	August 28, 2011	2.9	5.31	#9
47 (4.11)	"Soul of Fire"	September 4, 2011	2.4	4.39	#8
48 (4.12)	"And When I Die"	September 11, 2011	2.8	5.05	#9

== See also ==
- True Blood: Music from the HBO Original Series, Vol. 4
