= She's Not There (disambiguation) =

"She's Not There" is a 1964 song by The Zombies.

She's Not There may also refer to:

- "She's Not There" (CSI: NY episode), a 2009 episode of the TV series
- "She's Not There" (True Blood), a 2011 episode of the TV series
- She's Not There: A Life in Two Genders, a 2003 book by Jennifer Finney Boylan
