= Somebody That I Used to Know (disambiguation) =

"Somebody That I Used to Know" is a 2011 song by Gotye featuring Kimbra.

Somebody That I Used to Know may also refer to:

- "Somebody That I Used to Know" (True Blood), the eighth episode of the fifth season
- "Somebody That I Used to Know", a song by Elliott Smith from the 2000 album Figure 8

== See also ==
- Somebody I Used to Know
