= True Blood season 3 =

True Blood
- Season 3
- DVD cover art
- No. of episodes: 12

Release
- Original network: HBO
- Original release: June 13 – September 12, 2010

Season chronology
- ← Previous; Season 2 Next → Season 4

The third season of the television series True Blood premiered on June 13, 2010 simultaneously on HBO and HBO Canada. It concluded its run on September 12, 2010 and contained 12 episodes, bringing the series total to 36. It loosely follows the plot of the third novel of The Southern Vampire Mysteries series, Club Dead.

== Plot ==
The third season loosely follows the plot of the novel Club Dead, which finds Sookie teaming up with a werewolf sent by Eric, named Alcide in Mississippi in order to track down Bill, who has been kidnapped and is being held hostage by a vampire King. Season three is set throughout the course of 10 days.

== Episodes ==
| No. overall | No. in season | Title | Directed by | Written by | Original release date | US viewers (millions) |
|---|---|---|---|---|---|---|
| 25 | 1 | "Bad Blood" | Daniel Minahan | Brian Buckner | June 13, 2010 | 5.09 |
In the third season premiere, Sookie enlists the help of Eric in her search for the missing Bill. Sam begins his search for his birth parents. Tara falls into despair following Eggs's death and attempts suicide. Lafayette invites Tara's mother to help watch over her while Jason and Andy work to cover up the truth regarding their role in Eggs's death. Jessica attempts to save a man whose blood she drained. Eric is paid a surprise visit by the Vampire Queen of Louisiana, Sophie-Anne. Bill frees himself from his captors but finds himself in unfriendly territory in Mississippi.
| 26 | 2 | "Beautifully Broken" | Scott Winant | Raelle Tucker | June 20, 2010 | 4.26 |
Sam Merlotte gets to know his shifter birth family in Arkansas. Meanwhile, Bill is an unwilling guest at the home of Russell Edgington, the vampire King of Mississippi, who has ambitions to take over Louisiana. Jessica seeks advice from Pam on feeding off humans and on the disposal of bodies. Lafayette and Tara visit Lafayette's mother Ruby Jean in a psychiatric institution. Eric arrives at Sookie's home to protect her from werewolves.
| 27 | 3 | "It Hurts Me Too" | Michael Lehmann | Alexander Woo | June 27, 2010 | 4.46 |
Still searching for Bill, Sookie heads to Jackson, Mississippi, with Alcide, a werewolf bodyguard assigned by Eric to protect her. Sam's birth family pay him an unexpected visit at Merlotte's. Jason decides to become a police officer. Sheriff Bud Dearborne resigns in frustration. Arlene discovers she is pregnant and fears that the baby's father may be Rene. Franklin charms Tara and disposes of a body for Jessica and wants information on Bill in return. Eric buys Lafayette an expensive new car as an incentive. Haunted by visions from his past, Bill pledges his allegiance to the King of Mississippi. Bill and his maker Lorena have a violent sexual encounter.
| 28 | 4 | "9 Crimes" | David Petrarca | Kate Barnow & Elisabeth R. Finch | July 11, 2010 | 4.68 |
Bill breaks up with Sookie and tells her not to try to find him. Alcide and Sookie attend the werewolf initiation of his former fiancee, Debbie Pelt, and discover that Russell is in league with the werewolves. Sam promises to give his brother Tommy a job at Merlotte's and his family a new home. Jessica begins working at Merlotte's. Sheriff Bud Dearborne retires and Andy takes his place. Jason blackmails Andy into making him a cop. Franklin kidnaps Tara and takes her to Jackson. Bill reveals to Russell that Sophie-Anne is selling vampire blood. The Magister leads a raid on Fangtasia and finds vials of vampire blood. Eric and Pam tell the Magister that Bill is responsible for the crime. Bill procures a stripper as a meal for Russell and Lorena and, at Russell's command, joins in the feed.
| 29 | 5 | "Trouble" | Scott Winant | Nancy Oliver | July 18, 2010 | 4.86 |
Eric visits Russell, who catches him in a lie and forces him to admit that the Magister is holding Pam prisoner and will kill her unless he turns in Bill Compton for selling V. Franklin gives Russell information on Sookie's genealogy that he stole from Bill's home. Franklin continues to keep Tara prisoner at Russell's mansion, telling her that he intends to make her his vampire bride. Alcide and Sookie visit packmaster Colonel Flood, who advises them to keep away from Russell and his werewolves. Bill goes to Alcide's apartment to tell Sookie to leave but the King arrives and thwarts his plan. Russell orders his werewolf Cooter to grab Sookie, who protects herself with her mysterious powers. A Viking crown in Russell's possession makes Eric realize that Russell was responsible for killing his family many centuries ago. Lafayette and Jesús begin to get to know each other. Tommy begins working at Merlotte's. Jason starts work as a cop and falls for the enigmatic Crystal Norris. Terry moves in with Arlene.
| 30 | 6 | "I Got a Right to Sing the Blues" | Michael Lehmann | Alan Ball | July 25, 2010 | 4.74 |
Russell takes Sookie and Bill to his mansion, where Bill kills one of the bodyguards and attempts to kill Russell. Russell orders Lorena to take Bill to the slaves' quarters and kill him. Eric refuses to help Bill when asked by Sookie, and denies that she means anything to him. Russell tries to learn what Sookie really is. Jason discovers that Crystal has a fiancé. Sam suspects that his parents are using Tommy for dog-fighting matches. Lafayette and Jesús fall out over Lafayette's drug dealing. Eric accompanies Russell to Sophie-Anne's mansion, where Russell blackmails her into accepting his marriage proposal. Eric renounces his loyalty to the Queen and pledges his loyalty to the King of Mississippi. Tara escapes from Franklin's clutches by beating his head to a pulp and tries to rescue Sookie and escape. Sookie tries to save Bill, who has been tortured nearly to death by Lorena, and had his blood drained by Cooter and Debbie. Lorena thwarts Sookie's plan and attempts to kill her.
| 31 | 7 | "Hitting the Ground" | John Dahl | Brian Buckner | August 1, 2010 | 5.24 |
With Bill's help, Sookie stakes Lorena. Alcide and Tara attempt to help Sookie get Bill to safety. Debbie tries to thwart their plans but Tara concocts a plan in Sookie's head to get the upper hand. Alcide kills Cooter, causing Debbie to vow vengeance on Alcide. Sookie lets Bill feed on her blood to help revive him, but he ends up attacking her, putting her in a coma. While in her coma, Sookie visits a magical place and meets Claudine. Learning that Sookie does not have a blood type, Bill uses his blood to save her. Sam rescues Tommy from the dog fighting ring and persuades him to leave his parents. Jason attempts to learn more about Crystal from her jailed cousin. At Maxine's urging, local girl Summer declares her feelings for Hoyt. Eric forces Sookie's cousin, Hadley, into revealing Sookie's secret. Eric, Russell and Sophie-Anne go to Fangtasia to rescue Pam. Russell forces the Magister to marry him and Sophie-Anne, killing him immediately afterward.
| 32 | 8 | "Night on the Sun" | Lesli Linka Glatter | Raelle Tucker | August 8, 2010 | 5.09 |
Sookie and Bill break up when she regains consciousness in the hospital. Bill releases Jessica as her maker, but she refuses to leave him, so he trains her to help him fight the werewolves bound to come after Sookie. Alcide takes Sookie home, but he can't stay with her after the werewolves attack his sister Janice. Lafayette's mother escapes from the psychiatric institution and pays Lafayette a visit; Jesús comes looking for her and reignites his relationship with Lafayette. Arlene hires Holly to be the new waitress at Merlotte's. Crystal goes to Jason's house to seek refuge from her relatives. Hadley, acting on Eric's orders, warns Sookie that Russell and the werewolves are coming for her and that she should not trust Bill. Jason warns Crystal's father to stay away from her. Russell, Debbie and two werewolves attack Sookie in her home. Eric stakes Talbot, drawing Russell back to Jackson. Bill and Sookie have passionate makeup sex.
| 33 | 9 | "Everything Is Broken" | Scott Winant | Alexander Woo | August 15, 2010 | 5.00 |
Sookie tells Bill that she knows about the secret file he's been keeping on her family. Nan Flanagan visits Eric at Fangtasia to investigate the disappearance of the Magister. The Authority gives Eric the green light to kill Russell. Tara seeks therapy for her trauma. Hadley introduces Sookie to her son, Hunter, who is also a telepath. Bill meets Claudine in the mysterious dream world and finally discovers what Sookie is. Hoyt admits to Jessica that he doesn't care for Summer. Jason and Crystal tie up and plant V on her fiance, who later savages one of Andy's deputies. Sam beats Calvin nearly to death. Arlene admits she doesn't want Rene's child. Tara attends a rape survivors' group where Holly reveals she too is a survivor. Franklin comes back for Tara, but is shot by Jason with a wooden bullet. Russell appears on TV, killing the news anchor, and pledges to wage war against humans and the American Vampire League.
| 34 | 10 | "I Smell a Rat" | Michael Lehmann | Kate Barnow & Elisabeth R. Finch | August 22, 2010 | 5.39 |
Bill reveals to Sookie that she is part faerie. Eric makes a will, leaving his fortune to Pam. Sam ponders his dark past when he was a jewel thief. Arlene struggles with what to do with her unborn child. Jesús and Lafayette do V together and share hallucinations involving their grandparents. Jason confesses to Sookie that he killed Eggs, and then has to reveal it to Tara. Sookie confronts Eric about not trusting Bill. Eric responds by kissing her. Hoyt tells Jessica that he broke up with Summer, and wants to be with her again. Russell picks up a male prostitute who resembles Talbot and stakes him to recreate his dying moments so he can say goodbye. Crystal reveals to Jason that she is a were-panther. Eric detains Sookie.
| 35 | 11 | "Fresh Blood" | Daniel Minahan | Nancy Oliver | August 29, 2010 | 5.44 |
Sookie is rescued from Fangtasia's basement by Bill and Fangtasia dancer Yvetta. Lafayette continues to have frightening visions after his recent V trip. Jessica confesses to Hoyt that she killed a trucker, but Hoyt does not care and allows Jessica to feed from him. Eric confronts Russell and suggests that Sookie's blood will allow them to "day walk." Arlene believes Holly's potion has induced a miscarriage, but the baby survives. Sam goes on a drunken rampage and closes Merlotte's for the night after firing Tommy and insulting Terry and the waitresses. Jason finds out that high school football player Kitch is using V to enhance his athletic abilities. Tara tells Andy that she knows about Eggs' murder and the cover-up. As Tara and Sam hook up, Tommy breaks into Merlotte's safe. Bill and Sookie are stopped by Russell and Eric, who take them to Fangtasia. Russell and Eric drink Sookie's blood. Eric walks outside into the daylight. Russell follows but Eric handcuffs him to himself and they lie on the ground awaiting their burning.
| 36 | 12 | "Evil Is Going On" | Anthony Hemingway | Alan Ball | September 12, 2010 | 5.38 |
Sookie saves Eric from dying in sunlight, despite Bill's protests. At Eric's insistence, Sookie saves Russell, and ties him to a pole inside Fangtasia. Hoyt's mother and Summer stage an intervention to get Hoyt away from Jessica, but it backfires and Hoyt asks Jessica to marry him. Sometime later, his mother buys an anti-vampire rifle. Tara not only learns that Sam is a shapeshifter but also discovers her mother is having an affair with a minister; she leaves Bon Temps. As the DEA stages a raid on the Norris clan in Hotshot, Crystal convinces Jason to join her to warn the residents. However Felton kills Calvin, takes the V, and leaves with Crystal, which leaves Jason in charge of the defenseless residents. Lafayette discovers that Jesús is a brujo (male witch). Bill and Eric bury Russell alive in concrete, but afterwards Bill throws Eric into another pit to do the same. Eric escapes and tells Sookie that Bill was originally sent to Bon Temps to procure her for Sophie-Anne and that he purposely allowed the Rattrays to beat her nearly to death so that he would be able to feed her his blood. Sookie banishes Bill and Eric from her house. Sam chases Tommy down but he refuses to return Sam's money. After vowing to kill anyone who knows about Sookie's faerie heritage, Bill invites Sophie-Anne to his home for a duel to the death. Sookie visits Gran's grave, where she accepts Claudine's invitation to join her and the other faeries to their world.

== Cast and characters ==
=== Main cast ===
- Anna Paquin as Sookie Stackhouse
- Stephen Moyer as Bill Compton
- Sam Trammell as Sam Merlotte
- Ryan Kwanten as Jason Stackhouse
- Rutina Wesley as Tara Thornton
- Kevin Alejandro as Jesus Velasquez
- Marshall Allman as Tommy Mickens
- Chris Bauer as Andy Bellefleur
- Kristin Bauer van Straten as Pamela Swynford De Beaufort
- Nelsan Ellis as Lafayette Reynolds
- Mariana Klaveno as Lorena Krasiki
- Todd Lowe as Terry Bellefleur
- Denis O'Hare as Russell Edgington
- Jim Parrack as Hoyt Fortenberry
- Carrie Preston as Arlene Fowler
- Lindsay Pulsipher as Crystal Norris
- William Sanderson as Sheriff Bud Dearborne
- Alexander Skarsgård as Eric Northman
- Deborah Ann Woll as Jessica Hamby

=== Special guest cast ===
- Evan Rachel Wood as Sophie-Anne Leclerq
- Adina Porter as Lettie Mae Thornton
- Alfre Woodard as Ruby Jean Reynolds
- Tiffany Taylor as Nan's girl

=== Guest cast ===
- Theo Alexander as Talbot
- Grant Bowler as Coot
- James Frain as Franklin Mott
- Joe Manganiello as Alcide Herveaux
- J. Smith-Cameron as Melinda Mickens
- Melissa Rauch as Summer
- Gregory Sporleder as Calvin Norris
- Don Swayze as Gus
- Tanya Wright as Deputy Kenya Jones
- Natasha Alam as Yvetta
- James Harvey Ward as Felton Norris
- Cooper Huckabee as Joe Lee Mickens
- Brit Morgan as Debbie Pelt
- Lauren Bowles as Holly Cleary
- Jessica Tuck as Nan Flanagan
- Tara Buck as Ginger
- Grey Damon as Kitch Maynard
- Lindsey Haun as Hadley Hale
- Željko Ivanek as Magnus the Magister
- Lara Pulver as Claudine
- John Rezig as Deputy Kevin Ellis
- Carlson Young as Tammy
- Bryan Becker as Louie
- Ronnie Gene Blevins as T-Dub
- John Burke as Jerry McCafferty
- Greg Cipes as Bufort Norris
- Gregg Daniel as Reverend Daniels
- Kevin Fry Bowers as Turk
- John Hillard as Hank
- Allan Hyde as Godric
- Kate Lyuben as Natalie
- Andy Mackenzie as Creepy Biker
- Dakin Matthews as Dr. Robideaux
- Michael McMillian as Reverend Steve Newlin
- Tess Alexandra Parker as Rosie
- Dale Raoul as Maxine Fortenberry
- Michael Raymond-James as Rene Lenier
- Jeanne Baron as Hostess
- John Billingsley as Mike Spencer
- Sean Bridgers as Big Bobby
- Arielle Kebbel as Charlene
- Daniel Gillies as Jon
- John Prosky as David Finch
- Stewart Skelton as Minister
- Michael Steger as Tony
- Jorge Diaz as Husband

== Production ==
On January 20, 2010 HBO released a teaser trailer announcing that a third season of True Blood was in production, aiming for a Summer 2010 release date. The teaser featured images of bottles of TruBlood being manufactured on an assembly line. This was followed by a trailer featuring new footage and the song The Difference Between Us by The Dead Weather. This was released by HBO on May 13.

=== Crew ===
Alan Ball returned to executive produce and run season three. Michael Lehmann, who had directed five episodes at the end of the second season, is expected to return again to direct three more. Writers Alexander Woo and Raelle Tucker also returned to script episodes.

=== Casting ===
Anna Paquin, Stephen Moyer, Sam Trammell, Ryan Kwanten, Rutina Wesley, Chris Bauer, Nelsan Ellis, Mariana Klaveno, Todd Lowe, Jim Parrack, Carrie Preston, William Sanderson, Deborah Ann Woll and Alexander Skarsgård all reprise their respective roles in the third season. Additionally, Kristin Bauer, who plays vampire Pam in the series, is promoted to series regular.

After a long search, it was announced that Joe Manganiello was cast as werewolf Alcide Herveaux. He was later joined by Brit Morgan as Debbie Pelt. Marshall Allman is added to the third season as a series regular, cast as Sam Merlotte's younger brother Tommy Mickens and Cooper Huckabee plays Sam Merlotte's long-lost father. Alfre Woodard was cast as Lafayette's mother and Southland actor Kevin Alejandro as Jesus, her caretaker and a potential love interest for Lafayette. Denis O'Hare plays Russell Edgington, the Vampire King of Mississippi, while New Zealand actor Grant Bowler plays the leader of a werewolf biker gang and Theo Alexander plays the role of Edgington's partner Talbot. Allan Hyde has confirmed he will reprise his role as Godric in the form of flashbacks. James Frain appears as Franklin Mott.

=== Awards and nominations ===
The series won the GLADD Award for Best Drama Series, Alfre Woodard received a nomination for Best Guest Star in a Drama Series and the show received the "Holy Shit Scene of the Year" award at the Scream Awards for the scene in which Bill twisted Lorena's neck 180 degrees whilst the two were having sex.

== Ratings ==
=== United States ===
| Episode number (Production number) | Title | Original air date | Ratings share (Adults 18–49) | Viewers (in millions) | Rank per week on Cable |
|---|---|---|---|---|---|
| 25 (3.01) | Bad Blood | June 13, 2010 | 2.9/8 | 5.09 | #6 |
| 26 (3.02) | Beautifully Broken | June 20, 2010 | 2.5/7 | 4.26 | #12 |
| 27 (3.03) | It Hurts Me Too | June 27, 2010 | 2.5/7 | 4.46 | #15 |
| 28 (3.04) | 9 Crimes | July 11, 2010 | 2.7/8 | 4.68 | #10 |
| 29 (3.05) | Trouble | July 18, 2010 | 2.8/8 | 4.86 | #13 |
| 30 (3.06) | I Got a Right to Sing the Blues | July 25, 2010 | 2.8/8 | 4.74 | #10 |
| 31 (3.07) | Hitting the Ground | August 1, 2010 | 3.0/8 | 5.24 | #10 |
| 32 (3.08) | Night on the Sun | August 8, 2010 | 3.0/8 | 5.09 | #6 |
| 33 (3.09) | Everything is Broken | August 15, 2010 | 2.9/8 | 5.00 | #7 |
| 34 (3.10) | I Smell a Rat | August 22, 2010 | 3.0/8 | 5.39 | #8 |
| 35 (3.11) | Fresh Blood | August 29, 2010 | 3.2/8 | 5.44 | #8 |
| 36 (3.12) | Evil is Going On | September 12, 2010 | 3.0/7 | 5.38 | #13 |

=== United Kingdom ===
United Kingdom ratings data is taken from the Broadcasters' Audience Research Board.

| Episode number (Production number) | Title | Original air date | Total viewers on FX | Total viewers on FX+ | Total viewers | Rank on channel |
|---|---|---|---|---|---|---|
| 25 (3.01) | Bad Blood | January 14, 2011 | 524,000 | 94,000 | 618,000 | #1 (FX) #1 (FX+) |
| 26 (3.02) | Beautifully Broken | January 21, 2011 | 518,000 | 77,000 | 595,000 | #1 (FX) #1 (FX+) |
| 27 (3.03) | It Hurts Me Too | January 28, 2011 | 440,000 | 80,000 | 520,000 | #1 (FX) #2 (FX+) |
| 28 (3.04) | 9 Crimes | February 4, 2011 | 473, 000 | 102,000 | 575, 000 | #1 (FX) #1 (FX+) |
| 29 (3.05) | Trouble | February 11, 2011 | 483,000 | 107,000 | 590,000 | #1 (FX) #1 (FX+) |
| 30 (3.06) | I Got a Right to Sing the Blues | February 18, 2011 | 496,000 | 87,000 | 583,000 | #1 (FX) #2 (FX+) |
| 31 (3.07) | Hitting the Ground | February 25, 2011 | 494,000 | 80,000 | 574,000 | #1 (FX) #2 (FX+) |
| 32 (3.08) | Night on the Sun | March 4, 2011 | TBA | TBA | TBA | TBA |
| 33 (3.09) | Everything is Broken | March 11, 2011 | TBA | TBA | TBA | TBA |
| 34 (3.10) | I Smell a Rat | March 16, 2011 | 544,000 | 100,000 | 644,000 | #1 (FX) #1 (FX+) |
| 35 (3.11) | Fresh Blood | March 23, 2011 | 398,000 | 106,000 | 504,000 | #2 (FX) #2 (FX+) |
| 36 (3.12) | Evil is Going On | April 1, 2011 | 547,000 | 110,000 | 657,000 | #1 (FX) #2 (FX+) |

== See also ==
- Longwood (Natchez, Mississippi)
- True Blood: Music from the HBO Original Series, Vol. 3
