= True Blood season 2 =

Season of television series

True Blood
- Season 2
- DVD cover art
- No. of episodes: 12

Release
- Original network: HBO
- Original release: June 14 – September 13, 2009

Season chronology
- ← Previous; Season 1 Next → Season 3

The second season of the television series True Blood commenced airing in the United States on June 14, 2009, concluded on September 13, 2009, and contains 12 episodes. It is loosely based on the second novel of The Southern Vampire Mysteries, Living Dead in Dallas.

The second season explores telepath Sookie Stackhouse's relationship with her vampire lover, Bill Compton. It also introduces a number of sub-plots involving the anti-vampire Fellowship of the Sun church and Jason Stackhouse's indoctrination into the church by its leaders, Rev Steve Newlin and his wife Sarah. It also expands the role of Maryann Forrester, a powerful supernatural creature, who slowly gains control over the people of Bon Temps. Sookie and Bill travel to Dallas to help Eric find his maker, a two-thousand-year-old vampire named Godric, who has gone missing and is believed to have been kidnapped by the Fellowship of the Sun.

The second season aired Sundays at 9:00 PM in the United States. The season finale aired on September 13, 2009.

== Plot ==
Anna Paquin returns as the main character Sookie Stackhouse, a waitress with telepathic abilities. Stephen Moyer plays her love interest, vampire Bill Compton. At the beginning of the season Eric Northman (Alexander Skarsgård), the Sheriff of Area 5, recruits Sookie and Bill to find his maker, Godric (Allan Hyde). In Dallas, Godric's lieutenants, Stan Davis (Ed Quinn) and Isabel (Valerie Cruz), argue over the direction the vampires should take following Godric's disappearance. Christopher Gartin portrays Isabel's turncoat human boyfriend Hugo, who betrays the Dallas vampires to the Fellowship of the Sun.

Ryan Kwanten returns as Jason Stackhouse, Sookie's brother, who was recruited by the Fellowship of the Sun at the end of the previous season. He travels to Dallas to join the church, and Reverend Steve Newlin (Michael McMillian) and his wife Sarah (Anna Camp) both take a shine to Jason; Steve is impressed by his strength and Sarah is impressed by his looks.

In Bon Temps Sam Merlotte (Sam Trammell), the owner of Merlotte's bar, resolves to leave town but is persuaded to stay when he meets Daphne Landry (Ashley Jones), a fellow shapeshifter and lousy waitress. Maryann Forrester (Michelle Forbes) reveals herself to be a supernatural being, a maenad. She uses her powers to control the people of Bon Temps, starting with Tara Thornton (Rutina Wesley). "Eggs" Benedict Talley (Mehcad Brooks) becomes closer to Tara, and he kills Daphne while under the influence of Maryann.

Arlene Fowler (Carrie Preston) and Terry Bellefleur (Todd Lowe) also become involved while under the influence of Maryann.

At the beginning of the season, Tara's cousin Lafayette Reynolds (Nelsan Ellis) is imprisoned at Fangtasia with Royce Williams (Caleb Moody). After Royce is killed by Eric, Lafayette attempts to escape and is shot. He is later healed by Eric and ordered by Pam (Kristin Bauer) to resume selling vampire blood.

Jim Parrack returns as Hoyt Fortenberry Jason's co-worker. He meets Jessica Hamby (Deborah Ann Woll) and begins a relationship with her, much to the disgust of his mother, Maxine Fortenberry.

After being wrong about Jason Stackhouse, Andy Bellefleur (Chris Bauer) begins drinking heavily and is stripped of his badge. Despite this, he continues the search for Miss Jeanette's killer, later revealed to be Eggs under Maryann's influence.

In the last two episodes, Evan Rachel Wood is introduced as Sophie-Anne Leclerq, the vampire Queen of Louisiana.

Lettie Mae (Adina Porter) also returns, as does William Sanderson as Sheriff Dearborne.

== Episodes ==
| No. overall | No. in season | Title | Directed by | Written by | Original release date | US viewers (millions) |
|---|---|---|---|---|---|---|
| 13 | 1 | "Nothing But the Blood" | Daniel Minahan | Alexander Woo | June 14, 2009 | 3.70 |
The murder of Miss Jeanette – Tara's fake exorcist – leaves Bon Temps reeling. Tara is reluctant to reveal she knew her, believing her mother, Lettie Mae will relapse if she knew the truth. When she comes forward, Tara's fears are realized when Lettie Mae is told everything. When Tara is released, Maryann Forrester picks her up, and she gives Lettie Mae some harsh words. Meanwhile, Lafayette has been kidnapped and held in a basement somewhere with other captives – including Royce, who previously burned three vampires to death. Sookie and Bill's relationship is tested by his recently turned, and impatient charge Jessica. Jason impresses Steve and Sarah Newlin, leaders of the Fellowship of the Sun anti-vampire church. and is offered a place at their retreat to serve God. Sam is troubled by the presence of Maryann; it is revealed when he was a teenage runaway, he was raped by Maryann when he got caught burgling from her. In the present, Sam meets with Daphne, another young waitress. Tara is taken to Maryann's, getting involved with "Eggs" Benedict Tally. Sookie discovers that Bill murdered her sexually abusive Uncle Bartlett, but soon forgives him. It is revealed that Eric is the one keeping Lafayette captive, along with Royce. Royce attempts to escape, but is killed by Eric.
| 14 | 2 | "Keep This Party Going" | Michael Lehmann | Brian Buckner | June 21, 2009 | 3.41 |
After reconciling with Bill, Sookie suggests that he take things easier on Jessica as she is just a teenager. Bill explains that a new vampire is dangerous due to how erratic they are. En route to the Light of Day Leadership conference, Jason befriends an anti-vampire zealot named Luke. However, after Jason makes a good impression on the Newlins, Luke's good-natured friendship turns to bitter jealousy. Eric approaches Bill, demanding that he and Sookie help find a vampire sheriff named Godric, who disappeared from Dallas. Tara discovers Eggs' past as a criminal, and he shows interest in her. After a failed attempt to escape from the basement of Fangtasia, Lafayette is shot; he asks Eric, Pam and Chow to turn him into a vampire, and is ferociously bitten, but they refuse to turn him. Jessica misses her family, and sees her parents - who think she is missing - on TV. Jessica asks Sookie to take her to see her family. When Jessica's father comes home, he angrily accuses her of putting the family through hell. Despite Sookie's attempts to stop her, Jessica attacks her father for his past abuse. However, Bill shows up and glamours his way into the house just in time, forcing Sookie out of the house to "clean up her mess".
| 15 | 3 | "Scratches" | Scott Winant | Raelle Tucker | June 28, 2009 | 3.70 |
After glamouring Jessica's family and beginning the drive back to Bon Temps, Bill and Sookie argue fiercely about the night's events, and Sookie storms out of the car. As she walks off, she is attacked and poisoned by a mysterious creature with the head of a bull and a humanoid body. Bill rushes to Eric for help and, with the assistance of a goblin woman named Dr. Ludwig, Sookie is saved. At the Light of Day camp, Jason confesses his true feelings about vampires, and bonds with Sarah Newlin, letting out some of his grief over his Gran and Amy's deaths; Sarah reveals that she used to be a vampire sympathizer but now suspects they murdered her sister. At Merlotte's, Jessica and Hoyt become interested in one another. Sam warns Tara to stay away from Maryann and later, after snapping at Daphne, decides to take off for a while. At Fangtasia, Sookie takes Bill's blood to heal, and discovers Lafayette has been held in the basement. She manages to arrange his freedom in exchange for helping locate the missing vampire Godric in Dallas. Tara and Eggs' relationship hits a rough patch at one of Maryann's parties, when the guests become strangely sexual with one another, including Eggs and another girl. Lafayette, who has been traumatized, returns home and cries. Bill and Sookie walk in on Jessica and Hoyt making out. Sam and Daphne make peace with one another. Meanwhile, Daphne appears to have been attacked by the same creature that poisoned Sookie.
| 16 | 4 | "Shake and Fingerpop" | Michael Lehmann | Alan Ball | July 12, 2009 | 3.90 |
Bill throws Hoyt out of his house, Jessica storms off. When Sookie invites Jessica to accompany them to Dallas, Bill reluctantly agrees. Tara agrees to move into Sookie's house, and Maryann appears supportive. Jason becomes the victim of a cruel prank, but is invited to stay at the Newlins' lavish mansion. Sarah and Jason become more attracted, and Steve offers Jason a position in the Soldiers of the Sun, his elite army. It is revealed that Miss Jeanette was murdered by the same creature that attacked Sookie. Sookie, Bill and Jessica arrive in Dallas, where a limousine driver attempts to abduct Sookie, before Bill saves her. Through glamouring, Bill learns the abductor was sent by the Fellowship of the Sun. A traumatized Lafayette is visited by Eric, who offers some of his blood to heal. Sookie, Bill and Jessica arrive at the lavish Hotel Carmilla, and Bill meets with Eric. They discuss Godric's disappearance, and what this means for their safety. Sookie encounters a bellhop named Barry, who is also able to read minds. Back in Bon Temps, Tara spends her birthday alone, before Maryann shows up with Eggs to throw her a surprise party. Sam shows up with a gift to Tara from her mother, Lettie Mae, which Maryann throws away. Sam connects with Daphne, who reveals to Sam that she knows what he is. As the party goes on, Maryann performs an incantation, filling the party with an intense sexual energy. Maryann turns into a beast, while Tara and Eggs have sex.
| 17 | 5 | "Never Let Me Go" | John Dahl | Nancy Oliver | July 19, 2009 | 3.85 |
At Tara's birthday party, Sam follows Daphne out into the woods, where she reveals she is a shapeshifter. They start to make out, but are interrupted by Terry and Arlene, before Daphne wanders off. In Dallas, Sookie chases Barry, who tells her that if the Dallas vampires discover his abilities, it would mean trouble for them both. After Bill reprimands her for ordering a young man off of the Carmilla Hotel menu, Jessica calls Hoyt and the two talk about comic books. At the Light of Day Institute, Jason and the others are put through an intensive training course by Sarah, and a very demanding drill instructor. When Luke has trouble completing one of the exercises, Jason helps him out and is commended for it. Sookie tries to connect with Barry, learning he is ashamed of his abilities and can't control his telepathy. When she offers to teach him, Barry tells her to leave him alone. Meanwhile, Maryann tries to move into Sookie's house with Tara, who rebuffs her. Maryann casts a spell on Merlotte's patrons, turning them all against Tara to isolate her. Eventually, Tara concedes and invites Maryann to stay with her. In Dallas, Sookie offers to infiltrate the Fellowship of the Sun, posing as a convert in order to see if they are holding Godric. Bill disapproves of the plan, until Eric reveals that Godric was the one who turned him, saving Eric's life. After Jason walks in on Steve and Sarah having an argument, Steve shows Jason the seriousness of their mission with a bunker full of deadly weapons. Sarah later approaches Jason in the bath tub, and gives him a handjob. Lafayette resumes work as the Merlotte's cook. Sam and Daphne have sex. Sookie is saddened to learn that Barry quit his job, and Bill tries to comfort her. As they start to make love, a woman appears outside their room; Bill's maker, Lorena.
| 18 | 6 | "Hard-Hearted Hannah" | Michael Lehmann | Brian Buckner | July 26, 2009 | 4.00 |
Godric's minion, Isabel, visits Bill and Sookie with her human boyfriend, Hugo, who is to infiltrate the Fellowship with Sookie. Eric summons Lorena to drive Bill and Sookie apart. At Bon Temps, Sam and Daphne continue to bond, while Hoyt tells his mother that he is dating Jessica, a vampire. Andy interrogates Lafayette about his disappearance, and Lafayette has a breakdown and is comforted by Andy's cousin, Terry. The Fellowship have Luke and Jason build a crucifix platform for a "Meet The Sun" ceremony; wherein a vampire is tied to a cross and burns in the sun. Sookie and Hugo are greeted by the Newlins, where Sookie learns they have a captive vampire. Sam and Daphne go on a shape-shifting run; Daphne shifts into a pig and is chased by Andy, who thinks he recognizes the pig from Maryann's parties. At the Fellowship, Sookie learns someone tipped the Newlins about their mission, and is taken captive with Hugo. Shortly thereafter, Sarah seduces Jason. Pam visits Lafayette, ordering him to start dealing V again. Meanwhile, Bill resists Lorena's advances, sensing Sookie's in danger, but Lorena overpowers him. Hoyt visits Dallas to see Jessica. Returning from an errand, Tara and Eggs discover Maryann is hosting an orgy with the townspeople and are pulled into a sexual trance. Daphne tries leading a hesitant Sam into the orgy; he is abducted and witnesses Daphne putting a bull mask on Maryann, while Karl approaches with a sacrificial knife.
| 19 | 7 | "Release Me" | Michael Ruscio | Raelle Tucker | August 2, 2009 | 4.27 |
Andy, still chasing the pig, stumbles upon Maryann's orgy. Firing the pistol, Andy partially breaks up the orgy, allowing Sam to escape. Andy then gets his arm broken by Terry, under Maryann's influence. The next morning, Tara and Eggs wake up with no memory of the orgy. In the Newlin's basement, Sookie realizes someone sold her out. Meanwhile, Lorena won't allow Bill to go to Sookie's rescue; it's revealed that Bill left Lorena when he grew tired of killing innocents. Eric talks to Isabel about her relationship with Hugo, and she suggests Eric is coveting Sookie, which he denies. Stan confronts Eric for not directly dealing with the Fellowship, and Eric accuses him of killing Godric to become Sheriff. Jason convinces Sarah to keep their affair a secret, but when a claustrophobic Hugo reveals Sookie is Jason's sister, Steve suspects he's a vampire sympathizer. Steve sends Gabe to deal with Jason, who overpowers him. Sookie reads Hugo's mind, discovering he sold her out. Sam confronts Daphne and she explains to him that Maryann is a Maenad; an immortal creature from ancient Greece that is a follower of Dionysus; Daphne likens her to both God and Satan. Tara becomes suspicious of Maryann when Arlene reveals she blacked out as well. Andy confronts Terry at Merlotte's, raving about Maryann's orgy, but Sam being the only one who remembers. During their visit, Hoyt and Jessica lose their virginity. At the stream, Maryann thanks Daphne for her services, before having Eggs kill her. Fellowship church goers arrive for a "lock in". As Jason flees, Sarah shoots and incapacitated him. Sookie reaches out to Barry telepathically, sending a message to the hotel. Eric overhears and races for the church. As Gabe beats up Hugo, and attempts to rape Sookie, but is pulled away by Godric.
| 20 | 8 | "Timebomb" | John Dahl | Alexander Woo | August 9, 2009 | 4.43 |
Under Godric's orders, Eric and Sookie struggle to leave the Fellowship compound without bloodshed, and are cornered by Steve and his followers. In the woods, Sarah, who has been using a paintball gun, accuses him of betraying her, revealing that Sookie is a prisoner of the church. At the Carmilla hotel, Bill escapes Lorena, and orders Jessica and Hoyt back to Bon Temps. Jason overpowers Sarah, and along with Bill, creates a stalemate with Newlin's mob. The mob is overwhelmed by Stan and the Dallas vampires, but Godric orders a peaceful end to the conflict. In Bon Temps, Sam is lured to his bar to find Daphne murdered. The police arrest him with Maryann's revelers despite Andy's outlandish corroboration. At Sookie's house, Maryann feeds Tara and Eggs a meal made from Daphne's heart, driving them into a violent and sexual frenzy. After they arrive at the Compton manor, Jessica and Hoyt's have sex and realize Jessica's hymen has regenerated to its virginal state, to her chagrin. At Godric's Dallas nest, the vampires and Stackhouses recover, Godric shares his nonviolent ideals with Eric, and banishes Hugo out of mercy. Lorena stirs trouble between Sookie and Bill, and is then banished by Godric. Bill tells her that they will never see each other again, but she believes that she will see him because of their immortality. A mysterious intruder is revealed to be Luke; who has a suicide bomb wrapped in silver chains and bullets, and pushes the detonator.
| 21 | 9 | "I Will Rise Up" | Scott Winant | Nancy Oliver | August 16, 2009 | 4.46 |
Eric, wounded in the explosion, tells Sookie that he can't heal with silver in his body. Sookie sucks out the bullets, ingesting some of his blood. Bill tells Sookie that Eric he will now be able to sense her, and she may become sexually attracted to him. A bruised Tara and Eggs wake up, once again blacked out from the night before. Maryann tells them the importance of losing control and becoming closer to their god. In Dallas, Sookie and Jason bond over being the last of their family, and find the Newlins on TV, bickering with Nan Flanagan (leader of the AVL). It's revealed Godric was taken voluntarily. Eggs and Tara go to Merlotte's, and Lafayette suspect Eggs of beating Tara, getting into a fight. Sookie begins dreaming of Eric and doubting her feelings for Bill. Maryann looks for Sam at the jail, but he shifts into a fly and escapes. Jessica meets Hoyt's mother, Maxine, who belittles her, causing Hoyt to tell Maxine he won't be coming home. Lafayette and Lettie Mae visit Sookie's house to get Tara to come home. Tara's eyes turn black and she attacks her mother, but Lafayette grabs Tara, and helps take her away. Sam, as a fly in Sookie's house, witnesses this, and arrives at Andy's in his human form. In Dallas, Eric and his vampires defend themselves to Nan Flanagan, who fires Godric from his Sheriff position. Godric accepts his demotion, apologizing and swearing to "make amends". Eric is approached by Bill, who punches him in the mouth. Sookie tells Bill she must go and help Godric. On the roof, Godric intends to die by the sunlight, despite Eric begging him not to. When Eric is ordered to leave the roof, Sookie promises to stay with Godric, watching in tears as he dies.
| 22 | 10 | "New World in My View" | Adam Davidson | Kate Barnow & Elisabeth R. Finch | August 23, 2009 | 5.33 |
Sookie has an intimate dream about Eric, before she, Jason and Bill return to Bon Temps. They find the town in chaos; at Bill's house Hoyt and Jessica tend to Maxine, who is under Maryann's influence. Sam hides out with Andy Bellefleur, but is tricked into coming to Merlotte's by a desperate call from Arlene. There, the townsfolk trap both of them in the walk-in fridge. Jason arrives at Merlotte's with power tools, getting the citizens to leave by threatening to shoot a nail-gun into Arlene's head. Jason goes to help Sam, but the townsfolk recognize his deception and try to recapture Sam. Jason, wearing a gas mask, pretends to be the God Who Comes, while Andy uses a tree branch to make it look like he has horns. Jason pretends to smite Sam (who turns into a fly – seemingly vanishing), allowing them to escape. Bill and Sookie find Maryann at her house. When attacked, Sookie realizes Maryann is what attacked her in the woods. Bill bites Maryann, but finds her blood is toxic to him. When Sookie pushes Maryann away, a burst of light shines from her hand. Sookie and Bill escape as Maryann wonders what Sookie is. Bill and Sookie reach Lafayette's, finding Tara under Maryann's spell; they use Bill's glamor and Sookie's telepathy to break the spell. Tara wishes to rescue Eggs, but her family prevents her from leaving. Bill remembers reading about Maenads, and their worshipping of Dionysus, and realizes Maryann is one. Bill the vampire Queen of Louisiana, to learn how to destroy Maryann. Meanwhile, Maxine continues insulting Jessica and Hoyt, before Jessica's attacks her in a fit of anger.
| 23 | 11 | "Frenzy" | Daniel Minahan | Alan Ball | August 30, 2009 | 5.19 |
Bill reaches out to Sophie-Anne, Vampire Queen of Louisiana, asking how to defeat Maryann, but Sophie-Anne makes Bill spend the day with her in return. Sophie Anne explains Maryann is waiting for her god, and can only be killed if she believes he's come for her. Returning to Bon Temps, Bill runs into Eric and threatens to reveal that Eric is making Lafayette sell vampire blood. Maxine survives Jessica's attack, and Hoyt makes Jessica leave. Tara convinces her mother to let her go, having her hold Sookie and Lafayette at gunpoint to escape. Tara runs to Sookie's house, where she confronts and is assaulted by Maryann, putting her under her influence. Sam finds Arlene's children, Coby and Lisa, hiding in the woods from their mother and the townspeople. When Sam takes them in, Jason and Andy decide to take action against Maryann and, against Sam's advice; Jason and Andy find the police department are under Maryann's influence, but they manage to steal some weapons and ammo. Sam takes the kids to Fangtasia, going to Eric for help. Hoyt tries to help Maxine, who reveals that his father killed himself, and wasn't shot by burglars as Hoyt believed. Sookie and Lafayette arrive at her house, where Lafayette tries to shoot Maryann, who uses her henchman Karl to take the bullet. Sookie finds Tara and Eggs in her Gran's room, building a nest on the bed with a large, unhatched egg, before being cornered by a now brainwashed Lafayette.
| 24 | 12 | "Beyond Here Lies Nothin'" | Michael Cuesta | Alexander Woo | September 13, 2009 | 5.11 |
Taking Sookie captive, Maryann decides to appoint Sookie as the "Maid of Honor" at her sacrificial ritual. Jason and Andy try to advance on the crowd with their weapons, but become entranced themselves. Eric meets Sophie-Anne, revealing she ordered him to have Lafayette sell V again, and doesn't like that Bill knows what they're doing. Eric promises to deal with him. Bill finds Sam at Merlotte's and takes him to Maryann, against Sookie's objections. Eggs stabs Sam, offering his blood to Maryann. Sam survives, and tells Sookie to destroy all of Maryann's ritual offerings. Maryann pursues Sookie, but is stopped by a bull, believing it to be a manifestation of Dionysis. The bull gores Maryann's chest, and is revealed to be a transformed Sam, who rips Maryann's heart out. Bill gives Sam his blood to heal. Hoyt learns his mother wasn't lying about his father's suicide, and leaves her. Jessica leaves to apologize to Hoyt, but ends up feeding on a truck driver at a gas station. Sam visits his adopted parents asking to know who his biological parents were, despite his mother's warnings that they were bad people. Eggs, disturbed by his blackouts, has Sookie uncover his memories, revealing he killed Miss Jeanette and Daphne. Distraught, Eggs holds Andy at knife-point to get arrested; Jason witnesses this, and mistakenly shoots Eggs; Tara witnesses this and breaks down in tears. Bill takes Sookie to a French restaurant and proposes to her. Sookie is overwhelmed and excuses herself to the bathroom; after a moment, she decides she wants to marry Bill. However, Bill is abducted while Sookie's out. When she returns, she finds the place in disarray.

== Cast and characters ==
=== Main cast ===
- Anna Paquin as Sookie Stackhouse
- Stephen Moyer as Bill Compton
- Sam Trammell as Sam Merlotte
- Ryan Kwanten as Jason Stackhouse
- Rutina Wesley as Tara Thornton
- Chris Bauer as Detective Andy Bellefleur
- Mehcad Brooks as "Eggs" Benedict Talley
- Anna Camp as Sarah Newlin
- Nelsan Ellis as Lafayette Reynolds
- Michelle Forbes as Maryann Forrester
- Mariana Klaveno as Lorena Krasiki
- Todd Lowe as Terry Bellefleur
- Michael McMillian as Reverend Steve Newlin
- Jim Parrack as Hoyt Fortenberry
- Carrie Preston as Arlene Fowler
- William Sanderson as Sheriff Bud Dearborne
- Alexander Skarsgård as Eric Northman
- Deborah Ann Woll as Jessica Hamby

=== Guest cast ===
- Patricia Bethune as Jane Bodehouse
- John Billingsley as Mike Spencer
- Ashley Jones as Daphne Landry
- Adam Leadbeater as Karl
- Wes Brown as Luke McDonald
- Dale Raoul as Maxine Fortenberry
- Valerie Cruz as Isabel Beaumont
- Kristin Bauer van Straten as Pamela Swynford De Beaufort
- Greg Collins as Gabe
- Chris Coy as Barry Horowitz
- Allan Hyde as Godric
- Tara Buck as Ginger
- Christopher Gartin as Hugo Ayers
- Aisha Hinds as Miss Jeanette
- Valorie Hubbard as Random Frenzier
- Ed Quinn as Stan Davis
- Tanya Wright as Deputy Kenya Jones
- Price Carson as Mean Looking Frenzier
- Patrick Gallagher as Chow
- Alec Gray as Coby Fowler
- Jennifer Hamilton as Dancer #1
- Lindsey Haun as Hadley Hale
- Preston Jones as Dirk
- Jack Krizmanich as Ludis
- Ailsa Marshall as Desk Clerk
- Tess Alexandra Parker as Rosie
- Lauren Pritchard as Coralee
- Jessica Tuck as Nan Flanagan
- Laurel Weber as Lisa Fowler
- Avion Baker as Young Tara
- Jeanne Baron as Hostess
- Michael Bofshever as Orry Dawson
- John Hillard as Hank
- Caleb Moody as Royce Williams
- Judy Prescott as Sue Ann Merlotte
- John Rezig as Deputy Kevin Ellis
- Stephen Root as Eddie Gauthier
- Martin Spanjers as Young Sam
- Sharon Tay as Sharon

=== Special guest cast ===
- Adina Porter as Lettie Mae Thornton
- Evan Rachel Wood as Sophie-Anne Leclerq

== Production ==
=== Crew ===
Series creator Alan Ball returned as executive producer and head writer. Gregg Fienberg, who worked on HBO's Deadwood, joined Ball as executive producer.

Chris Offutt left the writing staff at the end of the first season and was recruited onto the Showtime dark comedy Weeds. Brian Buckner, Alexander Woo, Nancy Oliver and Raelle Tucker all returned from the first season. Along with Ball, all writers authored two episodes a piece with the exception of Woo, who wrote three including the finale. Script co-ordinator Kate Barnow and writer's assistant Elisabeth R. Finch co-wrote the tenth episode.

Daniel Minahan, Michael Lehmann, Scott Winant and John Dahl returned to direct multiple episodes. Michael Ruscio, the senior editor on the series and long-time collaborator with Ball, made his directorial debut with the seventh episode. Adam Davidson, who directed a fifth-season episode of Six Feet Under shot episode ten while Michael Cuesta, another Six Feet Under alum directed the finale.

Buckner and Oliver were the co-executive producers with Woo serving as supervising producer and Tucker as producer. Christina Jokanovich served as associate producer along with Luis M. Patiño. Bruce Dunn joined as co-producer and Mark McNair joined as producer.

== Reception ==
The second season received a generally more positive reaction than the first. The New York Post acclaimed the violence in the second season: "I'm happy to report that this season, there's More Blood! More Torture! More Killing! and More Intrigue! than last season."

New York Magazine praised the series: "It's really located at that dirty crossroads HBO discovered long ago, smart enough to be uninsulting, but obsessed enough (and graphic enough about) sex and wildness that it is addictively watchable, not so much a guilty pleasure as a binge food. Cable catnip, in other words." and Newsday described the second season as: "Silly, gross, soapy, mysterious, intriguing, exotic, erotic True Blood is fun. Even more fun this season."

By the end of the second season, True Blood scored 74, indicating favorable reviews, on Metacritic, an aggregator of critical responses, 10 more than the 64 scored by season one.

== Accolades ==
This season was nominated for Outstanding Drama Series at the 62nd Primetime Emmy Awards, but lost to Mad Men. The show was also nominated for a Golden Globe Award for Best Drama Series and Anna Paquin was nominated for Best Actress – Television (Drama). It won Favorite TV Obsession at the People's Choice Awards, which it was also nominated for Favorite Sci-Fi Fantasy Show, Best TV Drama Actress for Anna Paquin, but lost to Supernatural and Katherine Heigl respectively. It received nine nominations at the Scream Awards for The Ultimate Scream (the highest award), Best TV Show, Best Horror Actress for Anna Paquin, Best Horror Actor for Stephen Moyer and Alexander Skarsgård, Best Supporting Actor for Sam Trammell, Best Breakout Performance – Female for Deborah Ann Woll, Best Ensemble for the entire cast and Most Memorable Mutilation. The series won Best TV Show, Best Actress for Anna Paquin, and Best Actor for Alexander Skarsgård. It was also nominated for Outstanding Performance by an Ensemble in a Drama Series at the Screen Actors Guild Awards, but lost to Mad Men.

=== Ratings ===
The second-season premiere of the series on June 14, 2009, was watched by 3.7 million viewers, making it the most watched program on HBO since the series finale of The Sopranos. The total number of viewers for the season premiere, including the late night replay, was 5.1 million. The tenth episode of the second season (August 23, 2009) was seen by 5.3 million viewers, a new record for the series, with an overall weekly second season average of 11.5 million viewers including repeats.

==== United Kingdom ====
All ratings are taken from the UK Ratings website, BARB.

| Episode number (Production number) | Title | Original air date | Total viewers on FX | Total viewers on FX+ | Total viewers | Rank on channel |
|---|---|---|---|---|---|---|
| 13; 2-01 | Nothing But the Blood | February 26, 2010 | TBA | TBA | TBA | #TBA (FX) #TBA (FX+) |
| 14; 2-02 | Keep the Party Going | March 5, 2010 | 467,000 | 108,000 | 575,000 | #1 (FX) #1 (FX+) |
| 15; 2-03 | Scratches | March 12, 2010 | 555,000 | 94,000 | 649,000 | #1 (FX) #2 (FX+) |
| 16; 2-04 | Shake and Fingerpop | March 19, 2010 | 558,000 | 106,000 | 664,000 | #1 (FX) #2 (FX+) |
| 17; 2-05 | Never Let Me Go | March 26, 2010 | 522,000 | 95,000 | 617,000 | #1 (FX) #2 (FX+) |
| 18; 2-06 | Hard-Hearted Hannah | April 2, 2010 | 484,000 | 43,000 | 527,000 | #1 (FX) #7 (FX+) |
| 19; 2-07 | Release Me | April 9, 2010 | 390,000 | 89,000 | 479,000 | #1 (FX) #1 (FX+) |
| 20; 2-08 | Timebomb | April 16, 2010 | 466,000 | 90,000 | 556,000 | #1 (FX) #1 (FX+) |
| 21; 2-09 | I Will Rise Up | April 23, 2010 | 464,000 | 102,000 | 566,000 | #1 (FX) #1 (FX+) |
| 22; 2–10 | New World In My View | April 30, 2010 | 520,000 | 112,000 | 632,000 | #1 (FX) #1 (FX+) |
| 23; 2–11 | Frenzy | May 7, 2010 | 530,000 | 151,000 | 681,000 | #1 (FX) #1 (FX+) |
| 24; 2–12 | Beyond Here Lies Nothin' | May 14, 2010 | 558,000 | 88,000 | 646,000 | #1 (FX) #2 (FX+) |

== Soundtrack ==
List of Season 2 Ending Credits Songs in order.

1. Randy Travis—Nothing but the Blood (of Jesus)
2. Chuck Prophet—You Did (Bomp Shooby Dooby Bomp)
3. Debbie Davies—Scratches
4. Headbone – Dig
5. Katie Webster – Never Let Me Go
6. Dolly Kay—Hard-Hearted Hannah (the Vamp from Savannah)
7. Bad Livers – Death Trip
8. Beck- Timebomb
9. Lyle Lovett – I Will Rise Up
10. Sister Gertrude Morgan & King Britt – New World in My View
11. Screamin' Jay Hawkins – Frenzy
12. Bob Dylan – Beyond Here Lies Nothin

The official soundtrack was released on 25 May 2010 in the United States.
