= Raelle Tucker =

American screenwriter

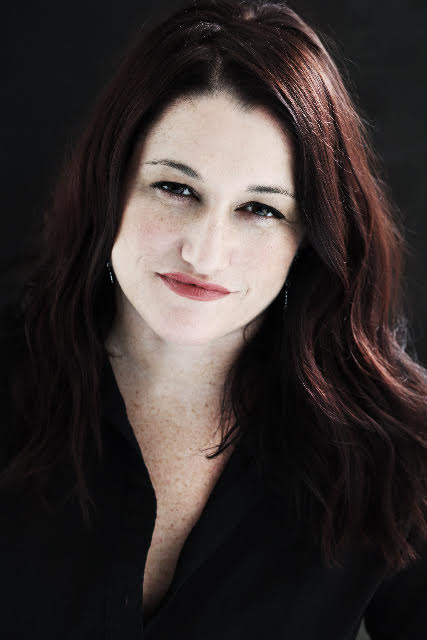
- Born: United States
- Occupations: Screenwriter; television producer; playwright

Raelle Tucker is an American playwright, television writer, producer, and showrunner, best known for her work on HBO's True Blood, Netflix's Jessica Jones, and for the Facebook Watch series Sacred Lies, which she created based on Stephanie Oakes's novel The Sacred Lies of Minnow Bly.

== Early life ==
Tucker was raised by her fashion and costume designer mother, Joy Borne, in Ibiza, Spain. Her mother was briefly involved in the Rajneesh movement featured in the Netflix docu-series Wild Wild Country. Her father was a playwright, Neil Tucker, who died from AIDS in 1995.

Growing up on a rural island without television, Tucker founded a theater company and began writing and directing plays to entertain herself and her community.

== Career ==
After moving to Los Angeles as a teenager, Tucker spent several years supporting herself as a waitress and exotic dancer while she wrote and produced plays like Will Strip For Food and Eve Of Paradise. Later, she attended the American Film Institute's prestigious Directing Workshop for Women, where she directed a short film The Clay Man, based on Jewish folktales of the Golem.

In 2003, a script co-written by Tucker and Sera Gamble was one of three finalists in Ben Affleck and Matt Damon's HBO filmmaking competition, Project Greenlight. She then found her first job in television writing for John McNamara's Eyes, an ABC series about a team of dysfunctional private investigators.

Tucker wrote for the first two seasons of the CW's Supernatural, winning a Constellation Award for Best Science Fiction Teleplay, before joining Alan Ball to work on HBO's breakout series True Blood. She wrote and produced True Blood for six seasons, rising to become executive producer of the show in 2013. Her work on True Blood was nominated for a Producers Guild award, a Writers Guild award, a Primetime Emmy, and multiple Golden Globes.

In 2015, Tucker executive-produced A&E's adaptation of the original Canal+ series The Returned with Carlton Cuse. Her writing on the show was nominated for a Women's Image Award.

Tucker went on to write and executive-produce season two of Jessica Jones on Netflix, alongside the creator and showrunner, Melissa Rosenberg.

In her free time, Tucker optioned the rights to Stephanie Oakes' novel The Sacred Lies of Minnow Bly, inspired by the Brothers Grimm's fairy tale The Handless Maiden. Tucker developed the pilot, before bringing on executive producer Scott Winant (True Blood, Fargo, Breaking Bad, My So-Called Life) and sold a ten-episode order of the series to Facebook Watch. Sacred Lies season one premiered on Facebook Watch in 2018, as the platform's first premium original series. Sacred Lies Season Two: The Singing Bones starring Juliette Lewis, Ryan Kwanten and Jordan Alexander premiered in February 2020. Both seasons of Sacred Lies were then acquired by Peacock, where they are currently streaming.

== Television career ==
=== Eyes ===
- 1.5 Shots
- 1.11 Art

=== Supernatural ===
- 1.3 Dead in the Water
- 1.12 Faith
- 1.14 Nightmare
- 1.21 Salvation
- 2.4 Children Shouldn't Play with Dead Things
- 2.10 Hunted
- 2.16 Roadkill
- 2.20 What Is and What Should Never Be

=== True Blood ===
- 1.6 Cold Ground
- 1.12 You'll Be the Death of Me
- 2.3 Scratches
- 2.7 Release Me
- 3.2 Beautifully Broken
- 3.8 Night on the Sun
- 4.6 I Wish I Was the Moon
- 4.12 And When I Die
- 5.3 Whatever I Am, You Made Me
- 5.9 Everybody Wants to Rule the World
- 6.1 Who Are You, Really?

=== The Returned ===
- 1.2 Simon
- 1.3 Julie
- 1.8 Claire
- 1.10 Peter

=== Jessica Jones ===
- 2.6 AKA Facetime
- 2.12 AKA Pray for My Patsy

=== Sacred Lies ===
- 1.1 Chapter One: The Handless Maiden
- 1.10 Chapter Ten: Subject: Minnow Bly
- 2.1 "Chapter One: The Singing Bones"
- 2.10 "Chapter Ten: With the Dancing Lions"
