= Authority Always Wins =

- True Blood episode
- Episode no.: Season 5 Episode 2
- Directed by: Michael Lehmann
- Written by: Mark Hudis
- Production code: 502
- Original air date: June 17, 2012
- Running time: 56 minutes

Guest appearances
- Dale Raoul as Maxine Fortenberry; Tara Buck as Ginger; Dale Dickey as Martha Bozeman; Kelly Overton as Rikki; Brian Geraghty as Brian Eller; Louis Herthum as J.D. Herveaux; Christopher Heyerdahl as Dieter Braun; Carolyn Hennesy as Rosalyn Harris; Peter Mensah as Kibwe Akinjide; Jacob Hopkins as Alexander Drew; John Rezig as Deputy Kevin Ellis; Henri Lubatti as Nigel Beckford; Cherilyn Rae Wilson as Cammy; Todd Giebenhain as Junior/Clerk

Episode chronology
← Previous "Turn! Turn! Turn!"	Next → "Whatever I Am, You Made Me"
- True Blood (season 5)

"Authority Always Wins" is the second episode of the fifth season of HBO's television series True Blood and 50th episode overall. First aired on June 17, 2012, it was written by Mark Hudis and directed by Michael Lehmann.

== Plot ==
=== Sookie and Lafayette ===
Tara attacks Sookie, and bites her. Pam grabs Tara and commands her not to bite Sookie and Lafayette and to stay in the house. Later, Tara continues trashing the kitchen. Sookie asks Lafayette to give Tara TruBlood. Tara attacks Lafayette but is hurt by Pam's commandments. Tara runs upstairs and trashes her room. As dawn approaches, Sookie and Lafayette lure Tara into Eric's Day Chamber by Letting her drink Lafayette's blood and silvering her. Later in the day Sookie hears Lafayette in the chamber contemplating on staking Tara. Sookies attempts to convince him not to, claiming that they can make a life for her, even as a vampire. She succeeds. Sookie goes to a vampire hunting store, buys Silver Misters and sets them up around the doors and windows. At nightfall Tara awakens and tells Sookie and Lafayette that she will never forgive either of them for turning her into a vampire; and runs outside only to be sprayed by the silver misters. Tara screams in agony and runs off into the woods.

=== Bill and Eric ===
Bill, Eric, and Nora are interrogated by the Authority. Torture is used in an effort to extract confessions of being allied with the Sanguinistas (a faction of vampires who believe in a literal interpretation of the Vampire Bible—that humans are nothing more than food—and oppose the Authority's efforts at mainstreaming). Bill reveals that Russell Edgington is on the loose and offers to kill him in exchange for sparing their lives.

=== Pam ===
Pam returns to Fangtasia. She has a flashback to San Francisco, 1905, where she was the madam of a brothel. While on the street at night, she is accosted by a switchblade-wielding assailant. Eric slits the man's throat and licks the blood from his fingers; he notes that Pam is unafraid and gives her money to compensate her for her blood-splattered dress.

=== Jason ===
Jason visits Hoyt at his mother's house and offers him a place to stay, but Hoyt rebuffs his efforts at reconciliation, telling him not to come around anymore and that they're "over". Hoyt's mother whispers thanks to Jason for splitting up Hoyt and "that red haired slut" and then mock pushes him out the door so Hoyt doesn't know.

=== Alcide ===
Alcide refuses to eat Marcus' body. He tells Martha he will not respect Marcus' death, doesn't want to be the new packmaster, and doesn't care about the laws of the pack.

=== Terry Bellefleur ===
Terry frightens and concerns Arlene with his PTSD symptoms.

=== Andy Bellefleur ===
Andy and Jason discover Debbie's vehicle. Andy finds a vial of V and initially pockets it before turning it over to Jason.

=== Luna and Emma ===
Frustrated at all the noise Emma is making when she is meant to be sleeping Luna goes into her room to find Emma has turned into a wolf pup.

== Featured music ==
The following songs appear in the episode:

- "Short Cut Down a Long Road" — Big Bad Johns
- "Coming for You" — Grant Langston
- "Hang It Up" — Ting Tings
- "Authority Song" — Bosco Delrey

== Reception ==
=== Ratings ===
True Blood was the number one cable program on the night it aired with 4.417 million viewers, earning a 2.6 rating in the relevant 18-49 demographic (down from a 2.9 for last week's episode).

=== Critical ===
Reviewer Carrie Raisler of The A.V. Club gave it a C+ and said "much of this episode felt like filler, a transitional piece before we get to the big hit."
