= Hopeless (True Blood) =

- True Blood episode
- Episode no.: Season 5 Episode 6
- Directed by: Dan Attias
- Written by: Alan Ball
- Production code: 506
- Original air date: July 15, 2012
- Running time: 56 minutes

Episode chronology
← Previous "Let's Boot and Rally"	Next → "In the Beginning"
- True Blood (season 5)

"Hopeless" is the sixth episode of the fifth season of HBO's original series True Blood and the 54th episode overall. It was first shown on TV on July 15, 2012 and was directed by Dan Attias and written by Alan Ball, creator of the series. The episodes of the series are based on the Charlaine Harris books, The Sookie Stackhouse novels whereas the episodes of the season are based on the fifth book in the series Dead As a Doornail (book) which follows the Shifters being murdered whereas in the season fang bangers and shifters are being hunted. Even so, the plot of the book is only one of the minor subplots. The episode primarily follows Bill and Eric who must now face Russell again after Roman is killed by him; Sookie and Jason go to a faery club where their family's dark history and greatest secrets are revealed to them. Meanwhile, Sam volunteers to assist Andy with a case. The episode was preceded by Let's Boot and Rally and was followed by In the Beginning, which picks up the events of Hopeless. The episode received fair reviews from critics. The episode ended several minutes earlier than the timeslot filled, as it was about 50 minutes or so, which notably also happened in Let's Boot and Rally. Stephen Moyer will pick up the events of In the Beginning. As of 2012 the episode has received the most ratings only behind by the season premiere episode Turn, Turn, Turn!

== Plot ==
=== Sookie ===
Alcide, Eric, Bill and Sookie are attacked by werewolves. Russell Edgington tries to feed on Sookie, but Sookie repels him with her faerie power. The Authority police force appears and takes Russell away. The Authority orders Bill and Eric to glamour Sookie and Alcide because they know too much about the evening's events. Because of her faerie heritage, Sookie cannot be glamoured. Bill pretends to glamour her. He tells her to forget that Bill and Eric ever existed and to live a normal human life. Eric actually does glamour Alcide, instructing him to protect Sookie, disengage with her romantically, and be slightly disgusted by her. That night, Alcide and Sookie return to Sookie's house. The next day, Sookie realizes what Eric did and uses her faerie powers to restore Alcide's memories. Sookie goes to work at Merlotte's, where Jason tells her about the faerie night club. Sookie and Jason return to the nightclub to find Hadley, their cousin, and warn her that faeries are dangerous. Sookie also recognizes the faerie who helped her escape from Queen Mabb. This faerie tells Sookie the story of her parents' death. Sookie becomes distressed and shoots faerie light from her hand. The light flickers and several other faeries shoot their own light at Sookie. Hadley screams and the scene ends.

=== Bill and Eric ===
Bill and Eric are sent back to the Authority where they are praised for their work in capturing Russell. Eric realizes Nora may have had a part in Russell's return. As Roman is about to execute Russell, Russell himself escapes and murders Roman.

=== Pam and Tara ===
Pam breaks up a fight between Jessica and Tara, although expressing pride in Tara for her fight ability, but qualifies it: "proud the way a human is proud of a well-trained dog."

=== Jason ===
Jason dreams of his father and swears he will kill the vampire that ruined his family. His father says "the only thing you have to fear of is--" but Jason wakes up. Jason tells Sookie about their parents true death. Jason takes Sookie to the faerie night club.

=== Sam ===
Sam and Luna are taken to a hospital while Emma runs off to her grandmother's for safety. Sam tells Luna about Emma and swears to kill the shifter-murderers. Luna decides to let Marcus' mother into having a role in Emma's life until they find the killer. Sam wants to help Andy with the case regarding the shifter murders. Sam and Andy go to a gun store looking to see if they can find the killer when Sam saves Andy's life.

=== Alcide ===
After the events at the asylum, Alcide takes Sookie home, and later challenges JD as leader of the pack.

=== Lafayette ===
Lafayette visits Ruby Jean and they both confide in seeing a disturbing message from Jesus.

=== Terry ===
Terry and Patrick see Eller getting killed by the Ifrit. Seeing the fire demon distresses them both. Terry blames Patrick for ordering Terry to kill the Iraqi civilian that cursed them. Terry returns to Bon Temps. Terry tells Arlene about the danger. He also reveals his history in Iraq. Arlene seems horrified. She also asks Terry if he is taking his medication. Terry insists he would endanger Arlene and the children by staying. He then leaves, as Arlene sobs.

== Featured Music ==
The following songs appear in the episode:

- Acumen Nation — "Broken Bodies"
- Doozy — "Partners in Crime"
- Five Z — "Say Goodnight"
- The Chillun — "Slow Movin' Man"
- The Brian Jonestown Massacre — "Gaz hilarant"
- Sugaray — "Reaching for Salvation"
- Orb Mellon — "Aberdeen"
- Galactic — "I Got It (What U Need)"
- Acucrack — "Atom Smashing"
- Percy Mayfield — "Hopeless"

== Critical reception ==
Reviewer Carrie Raisler of The A.V. Club gave it a B+ and said "The return of a mobile, furious Russell launched this episode to the bombastic level the season has been promising all along."
