= Whatever I Am, You Made Me =

- True Blood episode
- Episode no.: Season 5 Episode 3
- Directed by: David Petrarca
- Written by: Raelle Tucker
- Production code: 503
- Original air date: June 24, 2012
- Running time: 56 minutes

Guest appearances
- Mariana Klaveno as Lorena Krasiki; Melinda Page Hamilton as Jill Steeler; Peter Mensah as Kibwe Akinjide; Jacob Hopkins as Alexander Drew; Carolyn Hennesy as Rosalyn Harris; Christopher Heyerdahl as Dieter Braun; Tanya Wright as Deputy Kenya Jones; Tess Alexandra Parker as Rosie; John Rezig as Deputy Kevin Ellis; Tina Majorino as Molly; Linda Purl as Barbara Pelt; Steve Rankin as Gordon Pelt; Giles Matthey as Claude Crane; Anastasia Ganias as Tracy Togs; Co-starring: Melanie Camp as Dorothy; Abbie Cobb as Lindsey

Episode chronology
← Previous "Authority Always Wins"	Next → "We'll Meet Again"
- True Blood (season 5)

"Whatever I Am, You Made Me" is the third episode of the fifth season of HBO's television series True Blood and 51st episode overall. First aired on June 24, 2012, it was written by Raelle Tucker and directed by David Petrarca.

== Plot ==
=== Tara, Sookie and Lafayette ===
Tara runs through the woods, evading Sookie and Lafayette. She marvels at her enhanced perception of wildlife and the night sky. She happens upon a young woman trying to change a flat tire and pins her against the car, but as she's about to feed she catches a glimpse of her reflection in the windshield, apologizes to the woman and leaves. She then flees heading to Merlotte's to see an overwhelmed Sam, who hides her in the freezer. Sookie goes to Pam for help but is rejected; a short fight ensues between the two, leading to Sookie leaving Fangtasia and later going to Merlotte's. Meanwhile, as Lafayette is cooking, he poisons the food after being rushed by Arlene. Lafayette's face turns into the demon face Jesus had, scaring Lafayette who throws the food away. Upon reading Sam's mind, Sookie and Lafayette discover her location, but after releasing her, Alcide and Arlene realize Tara is a vampire. Meanwhile, Debbie's parents have come looking for Debbie, but discover she is "missing" and go to Alcide and Andy for help and information on the whereabouts of Debbie. This soon leads to Alcide confronting Sookie who lies, saying she has no idea about where Debbie is. Tara goes to a tanning salon where she attempts to commit suicide; Pam realizes what Tara has done, leading to Pam calling Tara some colorful variation of an idiot.

=== Bill and Eric ===
Bill and Eric barter for their lives with the Authority Chancellors and their leader, Roman. Salome and Roman enlist a new ally in the face of Russell's return—Steve Newlin—although Roman is clearly outraged that he even exists as a vampire. They soon make a deal: Steve will speak to the Fellowship of the Sun and attempt to show them that vampires are harmless and pose no real threat to humanity. Soon afterwards, a device is put on both Eric and Bill that will allow the Authority both to know their whereabouts and to execute them. Salome is revealed to be the actual Salome from the Bible; she and Bill have sex, and then Salome meets with Eric and they have sex too. They are subsequently released, but Nora is threatened and nearly killed by the Authority.

=== Pam ===
Sookie goes to Fangtasia to ask for help from Pam, who is still caught up in her memories of Eric and the strange murders at the Comstock Brothel. Pam kicks Sookie out of Fangtasia as she recalls of her human life, which reveals numerous things. Pam had had sex with Eric and requested that Eric make her a vampire. However, Eric rejects her proposition telling her many things about how being a vampire is not always fun. Pam then commits suicide so Eric would have to turn her. Later, Pam senses Tara is killing herself, but is not bothered, simply cursing Tara.

=== Jason ===
Jason bumps into an old high school teacher, who had had sex with Jason at one point. She dismisses it as something that should not have happened. However, after Jason has sex with her again, she suggests that it is good they had sex many years ago. However, Jason realizes that ever since they had sex when Jason was in high school, the only good thing that Jason could do was have sex, realizing he is sex-addicted. He goes home disturbed at his new feelings and feelings for Jessica, who then comes over, revealing she smelled a person who smelled amazing. She chased that person, but with no luck. She then came over to Jason to talk and make out, but he reveals his feelings, as she suggests they talk about it.

=== Alcide ===
Alcide is confronted by Gordon and Barbara Pelt the parents of Debbie, who are looking for their daughter. He reveals she cheated on him and that he had a huge fight with her, leading to them calling Andy, who goes to question Sookie. Sookie pretends to have not known or done any of this. Alcide himself goes asking Sookie if he has seen Debbie while she lies to him, nervous of what his possible reaction to her having killed Debbie might be. At Merlotte's he goes to see Sookie but instead discovers Tara is a vampire. Tara tells him that Sookie made her a vampire, forcing Sookie to explain that she killed Debbie. Alcide leaves, saying that everything is not fine or ok.

=== Terry Bellefleur ===
Terry and Patrick make plans to go look for their friend Brian Eller.

=== Andy Bellefleur ===
Andy after discovering his fellow officer seeing raw image and realizes it is a picture of a naked Andy in bed with Holly, who finds out and wants to "talk" to her kids and convince them to take it off the internet. Later, Debbie's parents come to Andy to help search for the missing Debbie, which he goes to Sookie, questioning her, she pretends to know nothing of Debbie's apparent "missing."

== Reception ==
=== Critical ===
Reviewer Carrie Raisler of The A.V. Club gave it a B and said "[a]lthough tonight’s episode contained roughly the same story and character beats as last week’s clunker, this one was significantly more entertaining. This is the weird side effect of the way True Blood tells stories: one week they’re awful, but the next week they are perfectly fine. The main thing driving tonight’s improved episode is a few of the disparate storylines finally coming together, clicking into place like the outside edge of a puzzle. All we need is the inside to get filled in a bit more, so we can see the whole picture."
