= Somebody That I Used to Know (True Blood) =

- True Blood episode
- Episode no.: Season 5 Episode 8
- Directed by: Stephen Moyer
- Written by: Mark Hudis
- Production code: 508
- Original air date: July 29, 2012
- Running time: 56 minutes

Episode chronology
← Previous "In the Beginning"	Next → "Everybody Wants to Rule the World"
- True Blood (season 5)

"Somebody That I Used to Know" is the eighth episode of the fifth season of HBO's True Blood, and the 56th episode of the series overall. It was written by Mark Hudis and directed by cast member Stephen Moyer, who plays vampire Bill Compton. The episode first aired on July 29, 2012 on HBO near the end of the season. This episode also marks the directing debut of Moyer.

The season (and thus its episodes) is loosely based on The Southern Vampire Mysteries fifth book Dead as a Doornail. Moyer noted that it was "fun" directing his fellow castmates though his wife joked and called him a "bossy" director. Moyer stated it was fun although quite unusual for him to direct them (the castmembers) himself prior to everything going on in the season.

== Plot ==
=== Sam and Luna ===
An emotional Luna unintentionally shifts into Sam's form and gets stuck.

=== Bill and Eric ===
The Authority celebrate the entirely new direction it has chosen to take regarding Lilith, while Eric tries to convince Bill and Nora about getting a message from Godric.

Bill is shaken by a memory from 1910.

=== Sookie and Jason ===
Jason convinces Sookie not to dump her faerie ability. Aided by Claude and his sisters, they go to the site where their parents were killed, and learn that they were murdered by a vampire named Macklyn Warlow.

=== Jessica and Hoyt ===
Hoyt's vampire-hating friends abduct Jessica, and require him to shoot her.

=== Alcide ===
J.D. raises the stakes for the upcoming fight against Alcide.

=== Lafayette ===
Lafayette finds some V that Jesus stored in his first aid kit. He uses it to heal his wounded lips. Jesus appears to him.

When he arrives home, Arlene and Holly are waiting for him. They ask him to perform a fake seance to contact the spirit of the woman who cursed Terry.

=== Tara and Pam ===
While tending bar at Fangtasia, Tara encounters Tracy, an old high school rival. After taking offense at Tracy's comments, Tara threatens her but Pam intervenes.

Later, Pam orders Tara down into Fangtasia's dungeon. There she presents Tara with Tracy who is bound and gagged. Pam glamours Tracy into seeing her "only purpose [as] to serve Tara." Tracy's gag is removed and she begs Tara to feed on her.

== Reception ==
=== Critical reception ===
IGN gave the episode a score of 6.5 out of 10, calling the episode "overly-absurd" and saying that "Yes, most of this episode was off its rocker [...] but in the midst of all the madness came, possibly, the first inkling of a driving, directional plot point this season;[...] This season just seems so arbitrary, with people bouncing around from story to story; mixing their chocolate in each others' peanut butter."
