= Turn! Turn! Turn! (True Blood) =

- True Blood episode
- Episode no.: Season 5 Episode 1
- Directed by: Daniel Minahan
- Written by: Brian Buckner
- Production code: 501
- Original air date: June 10, 2012
- Running time: 54 minutes

Guest appearances
- Dale Dickey as Martha Bozeman; Kelly Overton as Rikki; Conor O'Farrell as Judge Clements; Louis Herthum as J.D. Herveaux; Cherilyn Rae Wilson as Cammy; Tara Strong as Herself; Zoran Korach as Hayes; Aaron Christian Howles as Rocky Cleary

Episode chronology
← Previous "And When I Die"	Next → "Authority Always Wins"
- True Blood (season 5)

"Turn! Turn! Turn!" is the first episode of the fifth season of HBO's television series True Blood and 49th episode overall. It first aired on HBO on June 10, 2012 and written by Brian Buckner and directed by Daniel Minahan.

== Plot ==
Sookie and Pam make a deal: if Pam resurrects and turns Tara, Sookie will help repair Pam's relationship with Eric in addition to "owing her one." Nora hides Bill and Eric from the Vampire Authority, who wants them for Nan Flanigan's murder. Steve Newlin declares his love for Jason. Sam is confronted by Marcus' wolf pack, who take and torture Sam, until Alcide reveals he killed Marcus. Andy hooks up with Holly, but her two sons catch them asleep in bed. Terry's old Marine friend, Patrick, visits.

== Featured Music ==
The following songs appear in the episode:

- "Turn, Turn, Turn" — The Byrds as covered by My Morning Jacket
- "Feels Like the First Time" — Foreigner
- "Cherry Bomb" (re-recorded version) — The Runaways
- "MDV Serenade" — Blee
- "The Soul Train's a Comin'" — eBlues Highway
- "You're So Mean" — Biff Scarborough
- "Silly Love Songs" — Paul McCartney & Wings

== Reception ==
=== Ratings ===
True Blood was the number one cable program on the night it aired with 5.201 million viewers, earning a 2.9 rating in the relevant 18-49 demographic (down from a 3.0 for last year's season premiere).

=== Critical ===
Reviewer Carrie Raisler of The A.V. Club gave it a B+ and said "[d]espite the abject nature of the final episodes of season four, despite all the stories that held no interest and seemed like a waste of time, I decided to give the show another chance. After seeing the premiere—although I still have reservations—I’m glad I did."
