= Daniel Minahan =

American film director

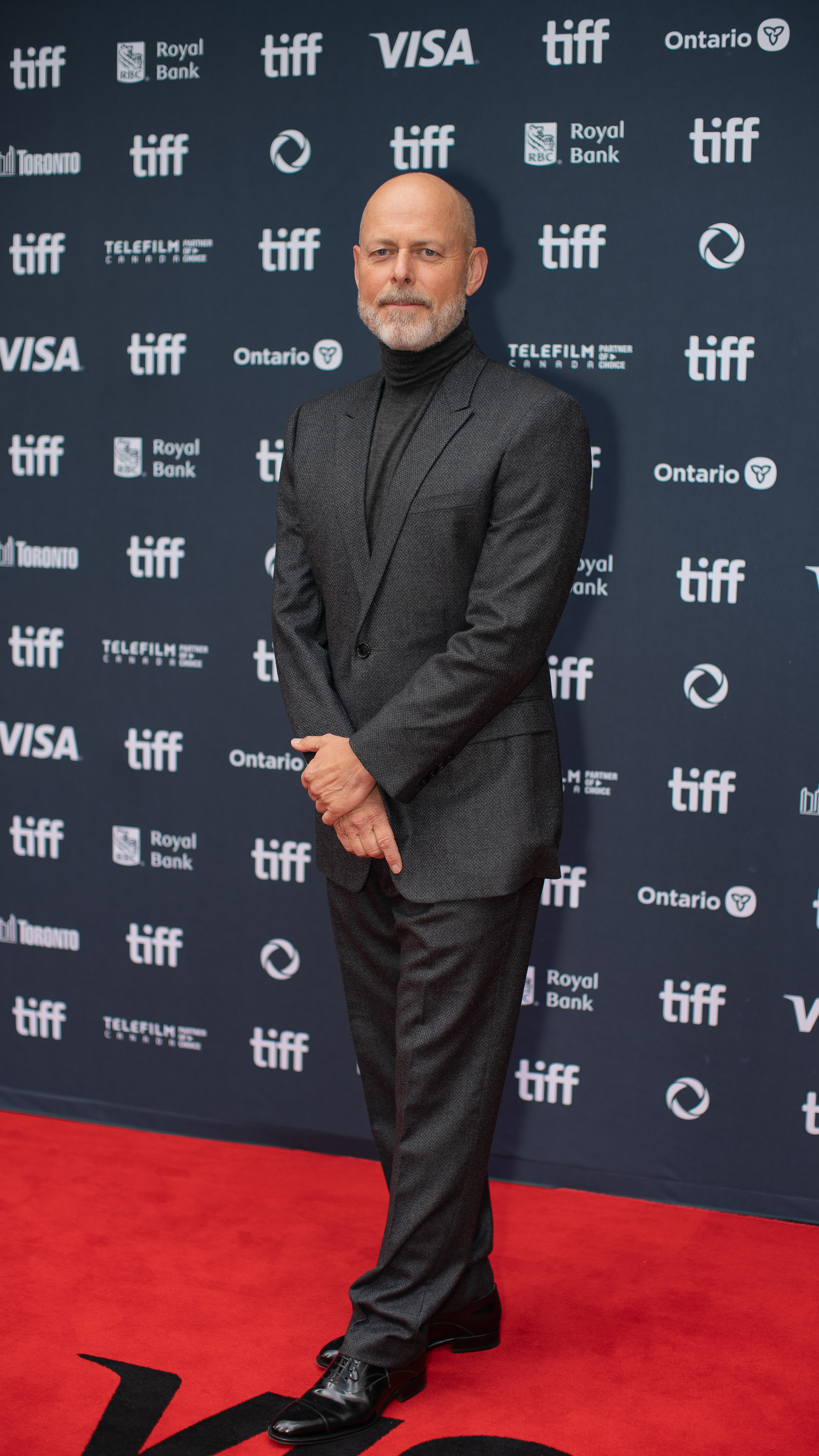
- Minahan at the Toronto Film Festival in 2024
- Born: 1962 (age 63–64)
- Education: School of Visual Arts (BFA)
- Occupations: Television director, film director, writer
- Years active: 1996–present

Daniel Minahan (born 1962) is an American television director and filmmaker.

== Career ==
Minahan has directed several episodes of the HBO original series Six Feet Under, Deadwood, True Blood, The Newsroom and Game of Thrones; he has also directed episodes of the Peabody Award-winning miniseries Fellow Travelers and The L Word on Showtime and Grey's Anatomy on ABC. He also wrote and directed the independent film Series 7: The Contenders.

He was also the writer (and second unit director) for the 1996 film I Shot Andy Warhol.

Minahan joined the crew of the HBO western drama Deadwood as a director for the first season in 2004. The series was created by David Milch and focused on a growing town in the American West. Minahan directed the episodes "Suffer the Little Children" and "Mister Wu". He returned as a director for the second season in 2005 with the episode "Advances, None Miraculous". For the third and final season in 2006, he directed the episode "A Two-Headed Beast". Minahan directed the 2019 film continuation of Deadwood.

The romantic drama On Swift Horses, directed by Minahan and based on the novel by Shannon Pufahl, had its world premiere at the 2024 Toronto International Film Festival on September 7, 2024, and was released in the US by Sony Pictures Classics on April 25, 2025.

== Personal life ==
Minahan majored in Film and Video at the School of Visual Arts in Manhattan, where he graduated with a Bachelor of Fine Arts degree in 1987. He is gay.

== Filmography ==
=== Television ===
Year	Title	Episode(s)	Ref.
2003–2005	Six Feet Under	"Everyone Leaves"	
2003–2005	Six Feet Under	"Can I Come Up Now?"	
2003–2005	Six Feet Under	"Eat a Peach"	
2003–2005	Six Feet Under	"Ecotone"	
2004–2005	The L Word	"Lawfully"	
2004–2005	The L Word	"Life, Loss, Leaving"	
2004–2006	Deadwood	"Suffer the Little Children"	
2004–2006	Deadwood	"Mister Wu"	
2004–2006	Deadwood	"Advances, None Miraculous"	
2004–2006	Deadwood	"A Two-Headed Beast"	
2005	Commander in Chief	"First... Do No Harm"	
2005–2007	Grey's Anatomy	"Owner of a Lonely Heart"	
2005–2007	Grey's Anatomy	"17 Seconds"	
2005–2007	Grey's Anatomy	"Time Has Come Today"	
2005–2007	Grey's Anatomy	"Where the Boys Are"	
2005–2007	Grey's Anatomy	"Let the Truth Sting"	
2007	The Black Donnellys	"The Black Drop"	
2007	Big Love	"Damage Control"	
2007	John from Cincinnati	"His Visit: Day Nine"	
2008	Swingtown	"Swingus Interruptus"	
2008	Life on Mars	"Tuesday's Dead"	
2008–2012	True Blood	"Sparks Fly Out"	
2008–2012	True Blood	"Nothing But the Blood"	
2008–2012	True Blood	"Frenzy"	
2008–2012	True Blood	"Bad Blood"	
2008–2012	True Blood	"Me and the Devil"	
2008–2012	True Blood	"Spellbound"	
2008–2012	True Blood	"Turn! Turn! Turn!"	
2009	The Good Wife	"Fixed"	
2011–2013	Game of Thrones	"A Golden Crown"	
2011–2013	Game of Thrones	"You Win or You Die"	
2011–2013	Game of Thrones	"The Pointy End"	
2011–2013	Game of Thrones	"Valar Dohaeris"	
2011–2013	Game of Thrones	"Dark Wings, Dark Words"	
2012	The Newsroom	"Amen"	
2013	Ray Donovan	"Bucky Fuckin' Dent"	
2013	Homeland	"Big Man in Tehran"	
2014–2016	Marco Polo	"Hashshashin"	
2014–2016	Marco Polo	"White Moon"	
2014–2016	Marco Polo	"Hunter and the Sable Weaver"	
2014–2016	Marco Polo	"Measure Against the Linchpin"	
2017	House of Cards	"Chapter 53"	
2017	House of Cards	"Chapter 54"	
2018	American Crime Story	"House by the Lake"	
2018	American Crime Story	"Don't Ask Don't Tell"	
2018	American Crime Story	"Alone"	
2020	Hollywood	"Hooray For Hollywood: Part 2"	
2020	Ratched	"Mildred and Edmund"	
2021	Halston	"Becoming Halston"	
2021	Halston	"Versailles"	
2021	Halston	"The Sweet Smell of Success"	
2021	Halston	"The Party's Over"	
2021	Halston	"Critics"	
2022	The Girl from Plainville	"Blank Spaces"	
2023	Fellow Travelers	"You're Wonderful"	
2023	Fellow Travelers	"Bulletproof"	
2026	Memory of a Killer	"Pilot"	

TV movies

- House Rules (2009)
- Deadwood: The Movie (2019)

=== Film ===
Year	Title	Director	Writer
1996	I Shot Andy Warhol	No	Yes
2001	Series 7: The Contenders	Yes	Yes
2024	On Swift Horses	Yes	No
