= Mark Hudis =

American television writer and producer (born 1968)

- Born: February 19, 1968 (age 58); Tarrytown, New York, U.S.A.
- Occupations: Television writer, producer
- Years active: 1997–present

Mark Hudis (born February 19, 1968) is an American television writer and producer who has worked on a variety of shows including Cybill, That '70s Show, Nurse Jackie, True Blood and A Series of Unfortunate Events. In 2010, his work on Nurse Jackie earned him both Writers Guild of America and Emmy Award nominations. Hudis attended Haverford College, a liberal arts school located outside of Philadelphia, and graduated in 1990.

He began his career writing for magazines. His work has appeared in MAD, GQ and Playboy.

== Career ==
Hudis began his writing career in 1997 when he received story credit for the Cybill episode "Like Family". He co-wrote the episode "Bakersfield" with Alan Ball in 1998 and was then recruited as a writer and story editor on the Fox sitcom That '70s Show. He remained a writer on the series for its entire eight season run, eventually becoming an executive producer at the beginning of its seventh season. He wrote a total of twenty-two episodes during the show's run. He became a writer and co-executive producer on Showtime's Nurse Jackie in 2009 and was an executive producer during the show's second season in 2010. Hudis worked on the writing staff of Alan Ball's vampire series True Blood for its fourth season in 2011.

=== That '70s Show episodes ===
- "Drive-In" (1.08)
- "Stolen Car" (1.14)
- "Hyde Moves In" (1.24)
- "Red's Birthday" (2.10)
- "The First Time" (2.16)
- "Parents Find Out" (2.19)
- "Roller Disco" (3.05)
- "Hyde's Christmas Rager" (3.09)
- "Holy Craps!" (3.20)
- "Bye-Bye Basement" (4.05)
- "Jackie Says Cheese" (4.13)
- "Hyde's Birthday" (4.23)
- "Black Dog" (5.09)
- "Hey, Hey What Can I Do?" (5.18)
- "Nobody's Fault But Mine" (5.23)
- "The Acid Queen" (6.04)
- "Baby Don't You Do It" (6.14)
- "Going Mobile" (6.24)
- "Mother's Little Helper" (7.07)
- "It's All Over Now" (7.16)
- "Til the Next Goodbye" (7.25)
- "Killer Queen" (8.12)

=== Nurse Jackie episodes ===
- "Chicken Soup" (1.03)
- "Twitter" (2.02)
- "P.O. Box" (2.09)

=== True Blood episodes ===
- "Me and the Devil" (4.05)
- "Soul of Fire" (4.11)
- "Authority Always Wins" (5.02)
- "Somebody That I Used to Know" (5.08)
- "You're No Good" (6.03)

== Awards and nominations ==
In 2011, Hudis received a Writers Guild of America award nomination and an Emmy award nomination for Nurse Jackie, which he shared with the entire writing staff.
