= Scott Winant =

American television director and producer

- Occupations: Television director, television producer
- Years active: 1982–present

Scott Winant /ˈwaɪnənt/ is an American television director and producer. He is a member of the Directors Guild of America and Producers Guild of America. Since 1996, Winant's production company, Twilight Time Films, has sold dozens of television projects to all the major networks. He is the son of character actor H.M. Wynant and casting director Ethel Winant.

== Filmography ==
=== Film ===
Producer

- The Initiation (1984)

Director

- 'Til There Was You (1997)
- The Journey (TBR)

=== Television ===
TV movies

Year	Title	Director	Producer
1982	World War II	No	Associate
1982	Paper Dolls	No	Associate
1987	J.Edgar Hoover	No	Co-Producer
2000	Sherman's March	Yes	Executive
2001	Honey Vicarro	No	Executive
2002	Georgetown	Yes	No
2003	No Place Like Home	Yes	No
2009	Body Politic	Yes	Executive
2015	Breed	Yes	Executive

TV series

Year	Title	Director	Producer	Notes
1983	The Powers of Matthew Star	No	Associate	Episode: "Matthew Star D.O.A."
1985-1985	The Insiders	No	Co-Producer	8 episodes
1988-1991	Thirtysomething	Yes	Yes	Director of 9 episodes
1994	Earth 2	Yes	No	Episode: "First Contact"
1994-1995	My So-Called Life	Yes	Co-Executive	Director of 3 episodes
1998	Significant Others	Yes	No	2 episodes
1998-1999	Cupid	Yes	Executive	Director of 2 episodes
1999	Get Real	Yes	Executive	Director of episode "Pilot"
1999	Anna Says	No	Executive	
1999	Once and Again	Yes	No	Episode: "A Dream Deferred"
2001	The West Wing	Yes	No	Episode: "The Leadership Breakfast"
2001	First Years	Yes	No	
2003	Dead Like Me	Yes	Consulting	Episode: "Pilot"
2003	Carnivale	Yes	Executive	Director of 2 episodes
2003	The Shield	Yes	No	Episode: "Barnstormers"
2004-2006	Huff	Yes	Executive	Director of 7 episodes
2007	Hidden Palms	Yes	Executive	Director of 2 episodes
2007	Californication	Yes	Executive	Director of 4 episodes
2007	Women's Murder Club	Yes	No	
2008-2014	True Blood	Yes	No	13 episodes
2009	Men of a Certain Age	Yes	Executive	Director of 2 episodes
2009	Trust Me	Yes	No	Episode: "What's the Rush?"
2010	Lone Star	Yes	No	Episode: "Unveiled"
2010-2011	Breaking Bad	Yes	No	2 episodes
2011	The Playboy Club	Yes	No	Episode: "The Scarlet Bunny"
2012	Awake	Yes	No	Episode: "That's Not My Penguin"
2013	Save Me	Yes	Executive	Director of 3 episodes
2014	Rake	Yes	No	Episode: "A Close Shave"
2014	Resurrection	Yes	No	Episode: "Home"
2014	Fargo	Yes	No	2 episodes
2014	Wild Card	Yes	No	Episode: "Pilot"
2015	Agent Carter	Yes	No	Episode: "Time and Tide"
2015	Grace and Frankie	Yes	No	Episode: "The Credit Cards"
2015	The Brink	Yes	No	Episode: "Sticky Wicket"
2015	The Affair	Yes	No	Episode: #2.10"
2015-2016	Good Girls Revolt	Yes	Executive	Director of 3 episodes
2016	Better Call Saul	Yes	No	Episode: "Amarillo"
2016	Preacher	Yes	No	Episode: "The Possibilities"
2016	Outcast	Yes	No	Episode: "What Lurks Within"
2017	Gypsy	Yes	No	2 episodes
2017	Shut Eye	Yes	No	Episode: "We're Not in Kansas Anymore"
2018	Sacred Lies	Yes	Executive	Director of 4 episodes
2022	The Thing About Pam	Yes	Executive	Director of 2 episodes

== Awards and nominations ==
Primetime Emmy Awards

Year	Category	Title	Result
1988	Outstanding Drama Series	Thirtysomething	Won
1989	Outstanding Drama Series	Thirtysomething	Nominated
1990	Outstanding Drama Series	Thirtysomething	Nominated
1991	Outstanding Drama Series	Thirtysomething	Nominated

Year	Category	Title	Result
1989	Outstanding Directing for a Drama Series	Thirtysomething	Nominated
1990	Outstanding Directing for a Drama Series	Thirtysomething	Won
1995	Outstanding Directing for a Drama Series	My So-Called Life	Nominated
2005	Outstanding Directing for a Drama Series	Huff	Nominated

Directors Guild of America Award

Year	Category	Title	Result
1991	Outstanding Directorial Achievement in Dramatic Series' - Night	Thirtysomething	Nominated

== Bibliography ==
- BozemanFilm|HATCH Experience
