= True Blood (soundtrack) =

True Blood: Music from the HBO Original Series

Soundtrack album by various artists
- Released: May 19, 2009
- Length: 47:22 (standard); 63:49 (deluxe)
- Label: Elektra

True Blood soundtracks chronology
| True Blood: Music from the HBO Original Series (2009) | True Blood: Music from the HBO Original Series, Vol. 2 (2010) |

True Blood: Music from the HBO Original Series is the soundtrack to the HBO television series True Blood. The soundtrack featured songs from the first season and was released on May 19, 2009, through Elektra Records, in conjunction with the series' DVD/Blu-ray release.

== Background ==
Gary Calamar, who supervises the series' music, said his goal for the show's soundtrack is to create something "swampy, bluesy and spooky" and to feature local Louisiana musicians. The soundtrack featured artists C. C. Adcock, Cobra Verde, Lucinda Williams, Lee Dorsey, Ryan Adams, John Doe, Kathleen Edwards amongst several others. The album also featured the theme song "Bad Things" by Jace Everett from his 2005 self-titled debut.

== Critical reception ==
Cody Miller of PopMatters assigned 7/10 and wrote "While the soundtrack to True Blood may not be perfect, it's still a fine collection of songs that do more than just make noise." Heather Phares of AllMusic wrote "True Blood's songs capture the feel of the show rather than focusing just on tracks that scored the series' key moments, and this approach feels more cohesive and listenable."

== Track listing ==
True Blood: Music from the HBO Original Series standard edition track listing
| No. | Title | Artist(s) | Length |
|---|---|---|---|
| 1. | "Bad Things" | Jace Everett | 2:43 |
| 2. | "Bleed 2 Feed" | C. C. Adcock; The Lafayette Marquis | 4:52 |
| 3. | "Lake Charles" | Lucinda Williams | 5:27 |
| 4. | "Give It Up" | Lee Dorsey | 3:00 |
| 5. | "Swampblood" | Legendary Shack Shakers | 3:10 |
| 6. | "Play With Fire" | Cobra Verde | 2:36 |
| 7. | "Just Like Heaven" | The Watson Twins | 4:15 |
| 8. | "Christine's Tune (A.K.A. Devil In Disguise)" | The Flying Burrito Brothers | 3:00 |
| 9. | "Two" | Ryan Adams | 2:37 |
| 10. | "Strange Love" | Slim Harpo | 2:08 |
| 11. | "From a Whisper to a Scream" | Allen Toussaint | 3:27 |
| 12. | "I Don't Wanna Know" | Dr. John | 3:22 |
| 13. | "The Golden State" | John Doe feat. Kathleen Edwards | 2:59 |
| 14. | "Bones" | Little Big Town | 3:46 |
| Total length: | | | 47:22 |

True Blood: Music from the HBO Original Series deluxe edition bonus tracks
| No. | Title | Artist(s) | Length |
|---|---|---|---|
| 15. | "Maison Creole" (Live at Merlotte's) | Adcock; Lafayette Marquis | 3:07 |
| 16. | "I'm Ready" (Live At Merlotte's) | Adcock; Lafayette Marquis | 3:14 |
| 17. | "Fool to Care" (Live At Merlotte's) | Adcock; Lafayette Marquis | 3:47 |
| 18. | "Whiskey's Gone" (Live) | Zac Brown Band | 2:49 |
| 19. | "Jesus Asked Me Out Today" | Amanda Jane and the God Rockets | 3:30 |
| Total length: | | | 63:49 |

== Chart performance ==
Chart performance for True Blood: Music from the HBO Original Series
| Chart (2012) | Peak position |
|---|---|
| UK Compilation Albums (OCC) | 31 |
| UK Album Downloads (OCC) | 90 |
| UK Soundtrack Albums (OCC) | 6 |
| US Billboard 200 | 105 |
| US Top Soundtracks (Billboard) | 4 |

== Accolades ==
Accolades for True Blood: Music from the HBO Original Series
| Year | Ceremony | Category | Nominee | Result | Ref |
|---|---|---|---|---|---|
| 2009 | BMI Television Awards | Best Theme Song | "Bad Things" (by Jace Everett) | Won | |
| 2009 | Hollywood Music in Media Awards | Outstanding Music Supervision – Television | Gary Calamar | Nominated | |
| 2009 | Scream Awards | Best Scream Song of the Year | "Bad Things" (by Jace Everett) | Nominated | |
| 2010 | Grammy Awards | Best Compilation Soundtrack Album for Motion Picture or Television | True Blood: Music from the HBO Original Series | Nominated | |
