= True Blood: Music from the HBO Original Series, Vol. 2 =

Soundtrack album by various artists
- Released: May 25, 2010
- Length: 66:32
- Label: Elektra

True Blood soundtracks chronology
| True Blood: Music from the HBO Original Series (2009) | True Blood: Music from the HBO Original Series, Vol. 2 (2010) | True Blood: Music from the HBO Original Series, Vol. 3 (2011) |

True Blood: Music from the HBO Original Series, Vol. 2 is the soundtrack featuring songs from the second season of the HBO television series True Blood. The album was released through Elektra Records on May 25, 2010, in conjunction with the third season's premiere in June.

== Background ==
The soundtrack featured contributions from Beck, Jace Everett, C. C. Adcock, Robbie Robertson, Jakob Dylan, Bob Dylan amongst several others. Two Howlin' Wolf songs were covered for the series—"Howlin' for My Baby" by M. Ward and "Evil (Is Going On)" by Everett and Adcock. The track list was revealed on May 10, 2010, where it was made available for pre-order on iTunes the same date. A live stream of the soundtrack was held on May 20.

Snoop Dogg, who revealed as the fan of the series had performed the rap song titled "Oh Sookie" (not featured in the soundtrack). A music video featuring Dogg was released in June 2010.

== Critical reception ==
Heather Phares of AllMusic described it as "an eclectic, expertly chosen set of songs that help define why True Blood is such addictive watching". Leah Greenblatt of Entertainment Weekly wrote "True Blood Vol. 2 manages to both evoke its source — that supernatural Louisiana swamp of longing, bloodlust, and just...lust — and work apart from it, too".

== Track listing ==
True Blood: Music from the HBO Original Series, Vol. 2 track listing
| No. | Title | Artist(s) | Length |
|---|---|---|---|
| 1. | "Howlin' for My Baby" | M. Ward | 3:00 |
| 2. | "Evil (Is Going On)" | Jace Everett; C. C. Adcock | 3:02 |
| 3. | "Bad Blood" | Beck | 3:27 |
| 4. | "How To Become Clairvoyant" | Robbie Robertson | 6:13 |
| 5. | "Shake and Fingerpop" | Junior Walker and the All-Stars | 2:43 |
| 6. | "Frenzy" | Screamin' Jay Hawkins | 2:10 |
| 7. | "Kiss Like Your Kiss" | Lucinda Williams; Elvis Costello | 3:50 |
| 8. | "Gasoline And Matches" | Buddy; Julie Miller | 3:12 |
| 9. | "You Did (Bomp Shooby Dooby Bomp)" | Chuck Prophet | 4:29 |
| 10. | "You're Gonna Miss Me" | The 13th Floor Elevators | 2:27 |
| 11. | "Fresh Blood" | Eels | 4:23 |
| 12. | "The Forgotten People" (Bon Temps Remix) | Thievery Corporation | 3:12 |
| 13. | "New World In My View" | King Britt; Gertrude Morgan | 5:31 |
| 14. | "Beyond Here Lies Nothin'" | Bob Dylan | 3:50 |
| 15. | "Bad Things" (acoustic) | Everett | 2:59 |
| 16. | "Ain't No Invisible Man" | Jakob Dylan | 4:52 |
| 17. | "You Can't Drive Me Away" | Stone Temple Pilots | 4:11 |
| 18. | "Dig" | HeadBone; Bubba Kendall | 3:01 |
| Total length: | | | 66:32 |

== Chart performance ==
Chart performance for True Blood: Music from the HBO Original Series, Vol. 2
| Chart (2010) | Peak position |
|---|---|
| UK Compilation Albums (OCC) | 70 |
| UK Soundtrack Albums (OCC) | 13 |
| US Billboard 200 | 84 |
| US Top Soundtracks (Billboard) | 8 |

== Accolades ==
Accolades for True Blood: Music from the HBO Original Series, Vol. 2
| Year | Ceremony | Category | Nominee | Result | Ref |
|---|---|---|---|---|---|
| 2009 | Grammy Awards | Best Song Written for a Motion Picture or Television | "Kiss Like Your Kiss" (by Lucinda Williams and Elvis Costello) | Nominated | |
| 2009 | Grammy Awards | Best Compilation Soundtrack Album for Motion Picture or Television | True Blood: Music from the HBO Original Series, Vol. 2 | Nominated | |
