= Deborah Ann Woll =

American actress (born 1985)

- Woll in 2026
- Born: February 7, 1985 (age 41); New York City, U.S.
- Education: University of Southern California (BFA)
- Occupation: Actress
- Years active: 2006–present
- Spouse: E. J. Scott (m. 2018)

Deborah Ann Woll (born February 7, 1985) is an American actress. She played Jessica Hamby in the HBO drama series True Blood (2008–2014), which earned her a nomination for a Screen Actors Guild Award. She portrayed Karen Page in five projects within the Marvel Cinematic Universe, including Daredevil (2015–2018) and Daredevil: Born Again (2025–present). Her film roles include Mother's Day (2010), Seven Days in Utopia (2011), Someday This Pain Will Be Useful to You (2011), Catch .44 (2011), Ruby Sparks (2012), Meet Me in Montenegro (2014), The Automatic Hate (2015), Escape Room (2019) and its sequel Escape Room: Tournament of Champions (2021), and Queen of the Ring (2024).

In 2022, she provided the voice and motion capture of Faye in the video game God of War Ragnarök. She will reprise the character in a leading role in the upcoming game, God of War Laufey. She has appeared in multiple tabletop gaming web series, served as Dungeon Master for several actual play series, and created actual play series such as Relics and Rarities (2019), Children of Éarte (2022), and Tales From Woodcreek (2025).

== Early life ==
Woll was born on February 7, 1985 in Brooklyn, New York City. Her father, Peter L. Woll, is an architect, and her mother, Catherine "Cathy" (née Champney), is a teacher at the Berkeley Carroll School. Woll is of German and Irish descent. She attended the Packer Collegiate Institute, the USC School of Theatre—where she received a Bachelor of Fine Arts degree in 2007—and the Royal Academy of Dramatic Arts.

== Career ==
=== Acting ===
Woll began her career with guest starring roles in several television series, including Life (2007), ER (2008), CSI: Crime Scene Investigation (2008), My Name Is Earl (2008), and The Mentalist (2008), and had a supporting role in the action-adventure television film Aces 'N' Eights (2008).

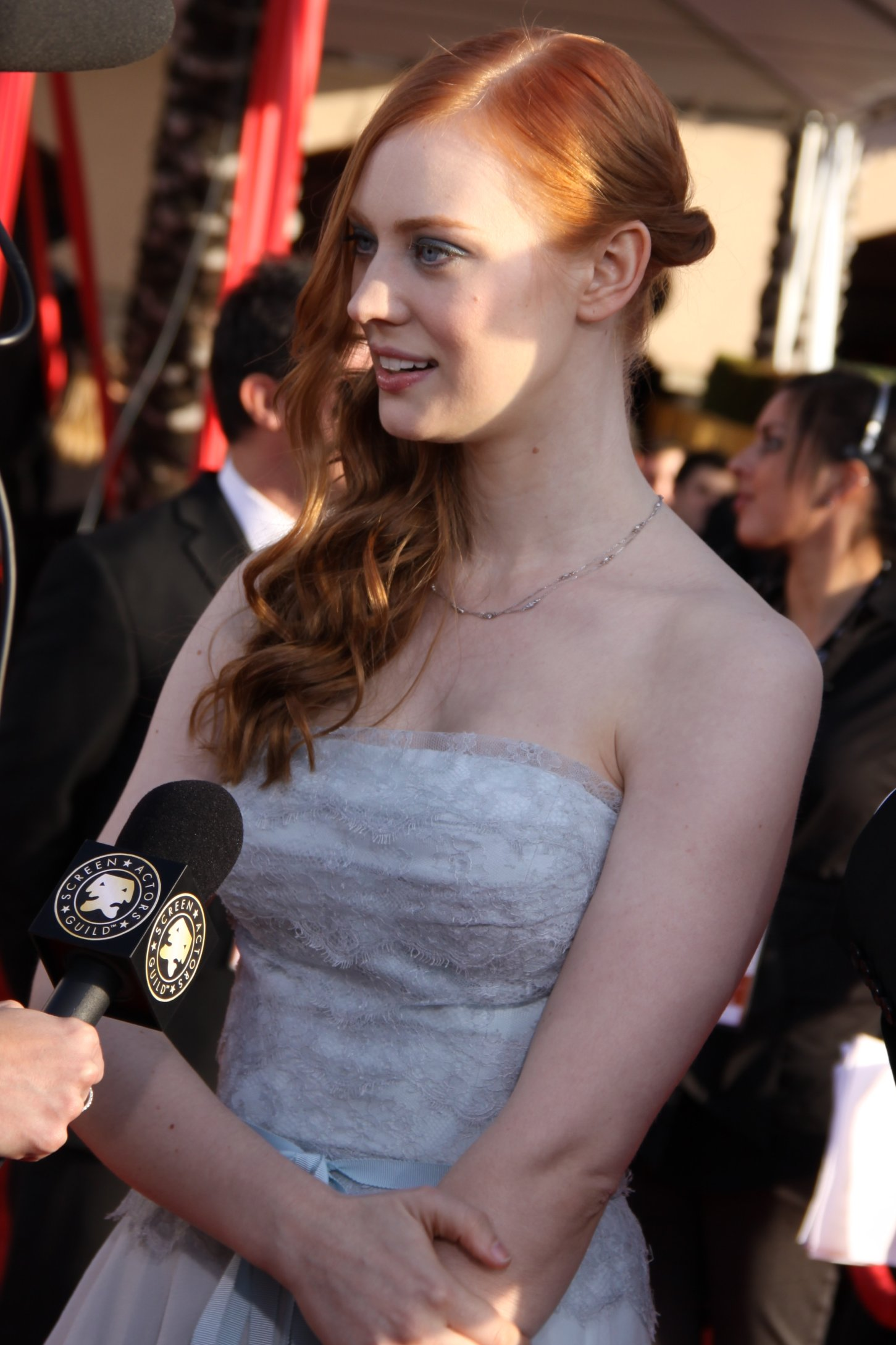
Woll at the Screen Actors Guild Awards in 2010, where she and her True Blood co-stars were nominated for Outstanding Performance by an Ensemble in a Drama Series

In 2008, Woll landed her breakout role as Bill Compton's vampire progeny, Jessica Hamby, in the HBO fantasy drama series True Blood. She originally joined as a recurring character in the first season, but was promoted to a regular cast member for the second season onwards. In 2009, she and her True Blood co-stars won the Satellite Award for Best Cast – Television Series at the 14th annual ceremony. At the 16th Screen Actors Guild Awards which took place the year following, she and her co-stars were nominated for Outstanding Performance by an Ensemble in a Drama Series. Woll maintained the role of Jessica until the series' ending in 2014.

In 2009, she made a guest appearance in an episode of Law & Order: Special Victims Unit, portraying a young woman who is found alive after being reported missing by her boyfriend. In 2010, Woll made her feature film debut in the psychological horror Mother's Day. In 2011, she starred in the supernatural thriller Little Murder, the sports drama Seven Days in Utopia, the action film Catch .44, and the comedy-drama Someday This Pain Will Be Useful to You.

In 2012, Woll made a brief appearance in the romantic comedy-drama film Ruby Sparks. The year following, she performed at the Wallis Annenberg Center for the Performing Arts in the play Parfumerie. That same year, she joined the cast of the drama film The Automatic Hate. In 2015, she starred in the independent romantic drama film Forever.

She has portrayed Karen Page in the Marvel Cinematic Universe, specifically as the female lead in Daredevil (2015–2018) and as a recurring actor in The Punisher (2017–2019) and The Defenders (2017). Daredevil earned her a nomination for a Saturn Award. In 2018, Woll starred in the comedy film Silver Lake. She also appeared in the action thriller film Escape Room in 2019, a role she reprised in its sequel Escape Room: Tournament of Champions (2021). The former was a major commercial success, surpassing initial expectations and debuting with $18.2 million, and finishing with $155.7 million.

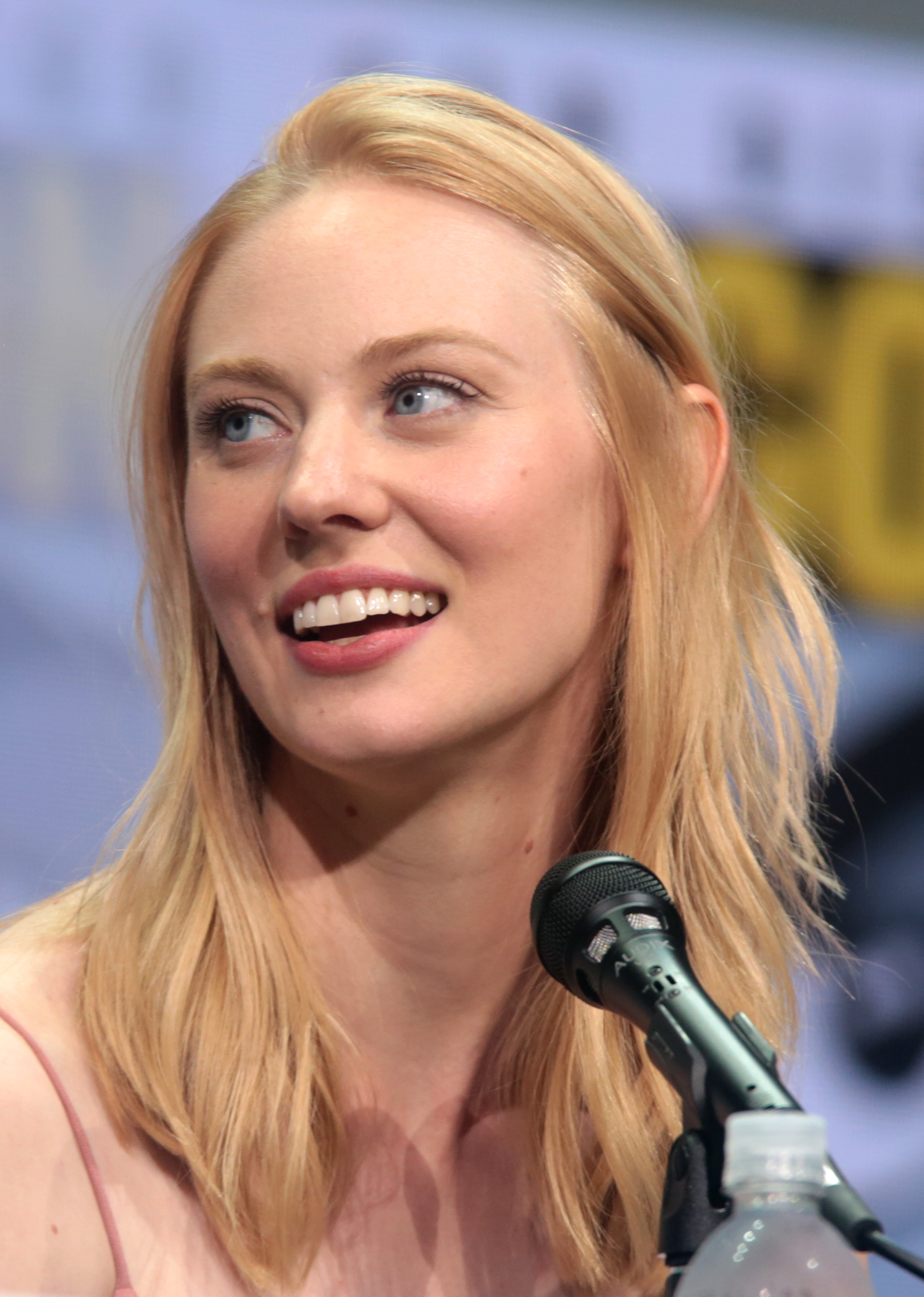
Woll at the 2017 San Diego Comic-Con

Woll provided the voice of Faye in the video game God of War: Ragnarok in 2022. This was also Woll's first role where she performed the motion capture for a character. In 2022, she performed as Katherine in director Shana Cooper's stage production of The Taming of the Shrew at the Old Globe in San Diego. In 2023, she played Harper in Angels in America: Millennium Approaches staged by Hungarian director Janos Szasz at Washington, D.C.'s Arena Stage.

Following the creative overhaul of Daredevil: Born Again (2025–present), Woll reprised her role as Karen Page. In 2026, she again reprised the role in the Special Presentation The Punisher: One Last Kill.

=== Tabletop gaming ===
Woll is an enthusiastic Dungeons & Dragons player and has been interviewed by D&D Beyond and Dragon Talk. She has appeared in several Dungeons & Dragons charity specials, as both a player and a Dungeon Master, produced by Lost Odyssey Events.

Woll starred in the second season of Force Grey: Lost City of Omu (2017), a Dungeons & Dragons (D&D) web series which focused on the Tomb of Annihilation storyline, and appeared as a guest player in Critical Role's second campaign. Greg Tito, in the book Welcome to Dragon Talk (2022), noted that Woll for a long time was "reluctant to do anything publicly with" Dungeons & Dragons, however, "Force Grey cracked the protective shell she had separating the game from her acting career, and she fully embraced her skills as a storyteller and a Dungeon Master". In 2019, she was the Dungeon Master of the Geek & Sundry show Relics and Rarities, which used a modified version of D&D. Tito called the show "really magical" and thought it created "something special" with "a brilliant execution blending imagination and TV production". In May 2019, Woll stated that Relics and Rarities had not yet been picked up for a second season and said, "I can say I have written a second season, or at least I’ve outlined it. It's ready to be fleshed out. Whether or not we get picked up, [...][the cast] will be coming over to my house and playing it, cameras or not".

Since 2019, she has been a regular guest in seasons 7 through 13 of the web show GameNight! by BoardGameGeek; in each episode, the cast introduces and plays a new board game. In 2022, it was announced that Woll would be the Dungeon Master for the ongoing D&D actual play show Children of Éarte. It premiered in March 2022 on the Demiplane Twitch channel. Woll was nominated for the "Best Game Master (Actual Play Video)" award at the 2023 New Jersey Web Festival for her work on Children of Éarte; the show itself was also nominated for "Best Overlay Design (Actual Play Video)" and "Outstanding Actual Play (Video)". In 2023, Woll was the author of the D&D adventure module Heroes' Feast: Saving the Children's Menu released digitally on D&D Beyond. She also appeared as a guest player in the show Faster, Purple Worm! Kill! Kill! on the Dungeons & Dragons Adventures FAST channel which premiered in November 2023. Woll was then a consultant on the Dungeon Master's Guide (2024) for the revised 5th Edition of Dungeons & Dragons.

In 2025, Woll and Ed Gass-Donnelly created the actual play Tales From Woodcreek for The Dungeon Dudes YouTube channel with funding from Ontario Creates; Woll was also the show's dungeon master. Corey Plante of Polygon noted that before shows such as Dimension 20 and Critical Role added soundstages and full set-design, Woll's 2019 "Relics & Rarities introduced immersive set design and bespoke physical artifacts and puzzles" and the "spiritual successor" Tales From Woodcreek takes that "one step further" by transforming the historic Black Creek Pioneer Village "into a bonafide D&D escape room". John Summers of Cracked praised show's "immersion engineering" and described Woll as an "absolute force of nature" and "a great DM". A second season is in development.

== Personal life ==
Woll began dating E. J. Scott in December 2007. They married in December 2018. Scott has choroideremia, a condition that ultimately results in blindness, and Woll uses her platform to help raise awareness of the disease. She has said that Scott's attitude towards his disability has inspired courage in her own, admittedly less life-changing, battle with celiac disease.

== Filmography ==
Key
†	Denotes project that has not yet been released

=== Film ===
Year	Title	Role	Notes	Ref.
2008	La Cachette	Sarah	Short film	
2010	Mother's Day	Lydia Koffin		
2011	Little Murder	Molly		
2011	Seven Days in Utopia	Sarah		
2011	Someday This Pain Will Be Useful to You	Gillian Sveck		
2011	Catch .44	Dawn		
2012	Ruby Sparks	Lila		
2013	Highland Park	Lilly		
2014	Meet Me in Montenegro	Wendy		
2015	The Automatic Hate	Cassie		
2015	Forever	Alice		
2018	Silver Lake	Mary		
2019	Stucco	Deliverer	Short film	
2019	Escape Room	Amanda Harper		
2021	Escape Room: Tournament of Champions	Amanda Harper	Theatrical cut only	
2021	Ida Red	Jeanie Walker		
2022	Willing to Go There	Margaret	Short film	
2023	Adventure Never Ends: A Tabletop Saga	Herself	Documentary	
2024	Queen of the Ring	Gladys Gillem		
2026	The Cycle	Meg		

=== Television ===
Year	Title	Role	Notes	Ref.
2007	Life	Nancy Wiscinski	Episode: "Powerless"	
2008	Aces 'N' Eights	Terrified Woman	Television film	
2008	ER	Aurora Quill	Episode: "Owner of a Broken Heart"	
2008	CSI: Crime Scene Investigation	Waitress Stephane	Episode: "For Gedda"	
2008	My Name Is Earl	Greta	2 episodes	
2008	The Mentalist	Kerry Sheehan	Episode: "Red Brick and Ivy"	
2008–2014	True Blood	Jessica Hamby	Main role; 70 episodes	
2009	Law & Order: Special Victims Unit	Lily Milton	Episode: "Solitary"	
2013	Hell's Kitchen	Herself	Episode: "Twenty Chefs Compete"	
2013	Axe Cop	Best Fairy Ever (voice)	Episode: "The Dumb List"	
2015–2018	Daredevil	Karen Page	Main role; 39 episodes	
2017	The Defenders	Karen Page	Main role; 4 episodes	
2017–2019	The Punisher	Karen Page	Main role; 5 episodes	
2023	Quantum Leap	Carly Farmer	Episode: "Fellow Travelers"	
2025–2027	Daredevil: Born Again	Karen Page	Main role; 11 episodes	
2026	The Punisher: One Last Kill	Karen Page	Disney+ television special	

=== Web series ===
Year	Title	Role	Notes	Ref.
Series
2017	Force Grey: Lost City of Omu	Jamilah, human barbarian	Main role; 17 episodes. Dungeons & Dragons show presented by Geek & Sundry, Nerdist and Wizards of the Coast.	
2018	Critical Role	Twiggy, gnome rogue (Arcane Trickster)	Campaign two, Episode: "The Stowaway"	
2019	Relics and Rarities	Dungeon Master	Creator & main role; 6 episodes & 1 special (D&D Live 2019: The Descent). Presented by Geek & Sundry.	
2019–present	GameNight!	Herself	Guest role; 84 episodes. Presented by BoardGameGeek.	
2022	Champions Of The Realm	Jamilah	Main role; 1 episode. Limited series presented by Dungeons & Dragons, RealmSmith, and Lost Odyssey Events.	
2022	Legends of the Multiverse	Sunny	Main role; 20 episodes. Presented by Dungeons & Dragons.	
2022–2024	Children of Éarte	Dungeon Master	Main role; 76 episodes. Presented by Demiplane.	
2023	Faster, Purple Worm! Kill! Kill!	Herself	Guest role; 3 episodes. Presented on the Dungeons & Dragons Adventures FAST channel.	
2025	Tales From Woodcreek	Dungeon Master / Rebecca Laske	Co-creator & main role. Presented on The Dungeon Dudes YouTube channel.	
Events and one-shots
2018	The Witch of Briarcleft	Dungeon Master	Presented by Wizards of the Coast at the Stream of Many Eyes event.	
2019	Lost Odyssey: The Book of Knowledge	Dungeon Master	Presented by Geek & Sundry, Roll20, and Lost Odyssey Events; charity special to support the Autism Society of America.	
2020	Celebrity RPG: Wasteland 3 Edition	Mickey	Presented by Geek & Sundry and Nerdist; sponsored by Xbox Game Pass.	
2020	Lost Odyssey: Champions	Herself	Presented by GameStop and Lost Odyssey Events; charity special to support Treehouse.	
2020	Deborah's Game	Dungeon Master	Presented by Wizards of the Coast at the D&D Live 2020: Roll w/ Advantage event.	
2020	Lost Odyssey: Night of Dread	Herself	Presented by Dungeons & Dragons and Lost Odyssey Events; charity special to support Extra Life.	
2021	SURVIVORS: Custom RPG One-shot	Dungeon Master	Presented by Skybound Entertainment; set in the universe of The Walking Dead: Survivors.	
2021	Faster, Purple Worm! Kill! Kill!	Herself	Presented by Wizards of the Coast and G4 at the D&D Live 2021 event.	
2021	The Dungeon & The Dragon	Mechabus	Presented by Wizards of the Coast at the D&D Celebration 2021 event.	
2021	Lost Odyssey: Promised Gold	Dungeon Master	Presented by Dungeons & Dragons, IGN, and Lost Odyssey Events; charity special to support Extra Life.	
2023	Lost Odyssey: The Red Scribe	Marigold Grubb	Presented by The Lord of the Rings: Rise to War and Lost Odyssey Events; charity special to support Extra Life.	
2025	Lost Odyssey: Godfall	Audrey	Presented by Geek & Sundry, Demiplane and Lost Odyssey Events; charity special to support Extra Life.	

=== Video games ===
Year	Title	Role	Ref.
2022	God of War Ragnarök	Faye	
2027	God of War Laufey †	Faye	

=== Stage ===
Year	Title	Role	Venue	Ref.
2013	Parfumerie	Amalia Balash	Wallis Annenberg Center for the Performing Arts	
2022	The Taming of the Shrew	Katherine Minola	Old Globe (San Diego)	
2023	Angels in America Part One: Millennium Approaches	Harper Pitt	Arena Stage	

== Awards and nominations ==
Year	Award	Category	Work	Result
2009	Satellite Awards	Best Cast in a Television Series	True Blood	Won
2010	Screen Actors Guild Awards	Outstanding Performance by an Ensemble in a Drama Series	True Blood	Nominated
2010	Scream Awards	Breakout Performance – Female	True Blood	Nominated
2015	Fangoria Chainsaw Awards	Best Supporting Actress on Television	True Blood	Nominated
2019	Saturn Awards	Best Supporting Actress in Streaming Presentation	Daredevil	Nominated
2026	Critics' Choice Super Award	Best Actress in a Superhero Series, Limited Series or Made-for-TV Movie	Daredevil: Born Again	Pending

== See also ==
- List of people diagnosed with celiac disease
