= True Blood: Music from the HBO Original Series, Vol. 3 =

Soundtrack album by various artists
- Released: September 6, 2011
- Length: 49:58 (standard); 62:34 (deluxe)
- Label: WaterTower

True Blood soundtracks chronology
True Blood: Music from the HBO Original Series, Vol. 2 (2010)	True Blood: Music from the HBO Original Series, Vol. 3 (2011)	True Blood: Music from the HBO Original Series, Vol. 4 (2013)

True Blood: Music from the HBO Original Series, Vol. 3 is the soundtrack featuring songs from the third and fourth season of the HBO television series True Blood. The album was released through WaterTower Music on September 6, 2011, four days before the season finale and was accompanied by a deluxe edition that featured four additional songs, released a week later.

== Background ==
Like the predecessors, the songs from the fourth season ranged from covers of classic songs from the 1950s to contemporary hits. It was performed by Neko Case, Nick Cave, Nick Lowe, Gil Scott-Heron, Karen Elson, Siouxsie and the Banshees, Jakob Dylan, Massive Attack, The Heavy amongst several others.

One of the prominent covers being the Zombies' 1964 single "She's Not There" by Neko Case and Nick Cave. The series' music supervisor Gary Calamar initially revealed that the showrunner Alan Ball had planned for using the Santana version of the song, but instead planned to re-record a new version of it, and after sorting through multiple singers, they zeroed on Cave and Case to record the cover. Both of them recorded the song at their respective studios in Seattle and Los Angeles. The song was released as a single on June 26, 2011 after the premiere of the first episode of the fourth season.

Scott-Heron's version of "Me and the Devil" was used in this season. Calamar and his music team found difficult to get approval from his estate for the use of song, after his death in May 2011, but eventually permitted and the song was featured in the soundtrack. The album, however, did not feature Taylor Swift's song "Haunted" which was played in a specific sex scene between the lead characters.

== Critical reception ==
Heather Phares of AllMusic rated three-and-a-half out of five and wrote "While True Blood: Music from the HBO Original Series, Vol. 3 doesn't feel as hand-picked as the first volume of music from the show, there are enough bright spots that die-hard fangbangers can buy this without feeling too suckered."

== Track listing ==
True Blood: Music from the HBO Original Series, Vol. 3 standard edition track listing
No.	Title	Artist(s)	Length
1.	"Season of the Witch"	Karen Elson	3:25
2.	"Me and the Devil"	Gil Scott-Heron	3:35
3.	"Te Ni Nee Ni Nu"	Slim Harpo	2:05
4.	"She's Not There"	Neko Case	2:29
5.	"Hitting the Ground"	PJ Harvey	2:59
6.	"Spellbound"	Siouxsie and the Banshees	3:19
7.	"9 Crimes"	Damien Rice	3:11
8.	"Cold Grey Light of Dawn"	Nick Lowe	2:56
9.	"Hell's Bells"	Cary Ann Hearst	3:36
10.	"Gonna Be a Darkness"	Jakob Dylan	4:50
11.	"What You Do to Me"	Blakroc	5:07
12.	"Paradise Circus"	Massive Attack	4:59
13.	"And When I Die"	The Heavy	4:43
14.	"Bad Things"	Jace Everett	2:44
Total length:			49:58

True Blood: Music from the HBO Original Series, Vol. 3 deluxe edition bonus tracks
No.	Title	Artist(s)	Length
15.	"Bad Things"	Black Rebel Motorcycle Club	3:35
16.	"She's Not There"	Dick Isreal and the Soothsayer	2:40
17.	"She's Not There"	L'Avventura	3:21
18.	"She's Not There"	Paper Pilots	3:04
Total length:			62:34

== Charts ==
Chart performance for True Blood: Music from the HBO Original Series, Vol. 3
Chart (2011)	Peak position
US Billboard 200	191
US Top Soundtracks (Billboard)	11

== Accolades ==
Accolades for True Blood: Music from the HBO Original Series, Vol. 3
Year	Ceremony	Category	Nominee	Result	Ref
2012	Grammy Awards	Best Compilation Soundtrack for Visual Media	True Blood: Music from the HBO Original Series, Vol. 3	Nominated	
