= True Blood: Music from the HBO Original Series, Vol. 4 =

Soundtrack album by various artists
- Released: May 28, 2013
- Length: 48:54
- Label: ATO

True Blood soundtracks chronology
True Blood: Music from the HBO Original Series, Vol. 3 (2011)	True Blood: Music from the HBO Original Series, Vol. 4 (2013)

True Blood: Music from the HBO Original Series, Vol. 4 is the soundtrack featuring songs from the fifth and sixth seasons of the HBO television series True Blood. The album was released on May 28, 2013, through ATO Records.

== Background ==
The soundtrack featured songs from Iggy Pop, Eric Burdon, Jenny Lewis, My Morning Jacket, Bethany Cosentino, The Flaming Lips and Deap Vally amongst others. The 1964 song "Don't Let Me Be Misunderstood" by Nina Simone was covered by Burdon and Lewis, where the former described it had a "really fresh feeling to it".

== Critical reception ==
Scott Hallam of Dread Central assigned two-and-a-half out of five stating that the album "feature more electronic music that is as far from the luscious, sexy tunes the albums opens with as you can get". Nick Catucci of Rolling Stone wrote "Although this soundtrack shows a certain fealty to familiar names and indie faves, the songs (some cut just for the show) clearly favor sex, rot and fine times in between." A critic from Renowned for Sound, described the soundtrack as "super enjoyable with a great track listing". Hal Horowitz of American Songwriter wrote "Despite its obvious commercial intentions, this diverse, artful and intelligently assembled set should get anyone's blood flowing." Matt James of PopMatters rated 6 out of 10 to the soundtrack and wrote "Vol. Four, like its three Grammy-nominated kinfolk, has been clearly compiled with care."

== Track listing ==
True Blood: Music from the HBO Original Series, Vol. 4 track listing
No.	Title	Artist(s)	Length
1.	"Don't Let Me Be Misunderstood"	Eric Burdon with Jenny Lewis	3:15
2.	"Let's Boot and Rally"	Iggy Pop with Bethany Cosentino	2:54
3.	"What Makes a Good Man?"	The Heavy	3:48
4.	"Smokestack Lightning"	Howlin' Wolf	3:09
5.	"Pocket Change"	Alabama Shakes	2:26
6.	"Authority Song"	Bosco Delrey	3:28
7.	"Turn Turn Turn"	My Morning Jacket	4:35
8.	"Your Face Can Tell The Future"	The Flaming Lips	5:21
9.	"The Sun"	The Naked and Famous	3:56
10.	"Undertow"	Warpaint	5:53
11.	"I Wanna Be Your Man"	Mobley	2:30
12.	"(She's A) Wanderer"	Deap Vally	2:24
13.	"Whatever I Am, You Made Me"	Koko Taylor	2:29
14.	"We'll Meet Again"	Los Lobos	2:46
Total length:			48:54

== Charts ==
Chart performance for True Blood: Music from the HBO Original Series, Vol. 4
Chart (2013)	Peak position
US Top Soundtracks (Billboard)	13
