= Jessica Hamby =

- True Blood character
- First appearance: "I Don't Wanna Know"; November 9, 2008
- Created by: Chris Offutt
- Portrayed by: Deborah Ann Woll

In-universe information
- Species: Vampire
- Gender: Female
- Occupation: Waitress, Vampire Princess Of Louisiana
- Family: Bill Compton (maker); Jordan Hamby (human father); Mrs. Hamby (human mother); Eden Hamby (human sister)
- Spouse: Hoyt Fortenberry
- Religion: Christian

Jessica Hamby is a fictional character in the True Blood series, portrayed by Deborah Ann Woll. In the series, which chronicles the life of human waitress Sookie Stackhouse and her friends after vampires make themselves known to humans, Jessica is a newly turned vampire who must learn to deal with her vampiric abilities, weaknesses, and altered lifestyle.

== Character biography ==
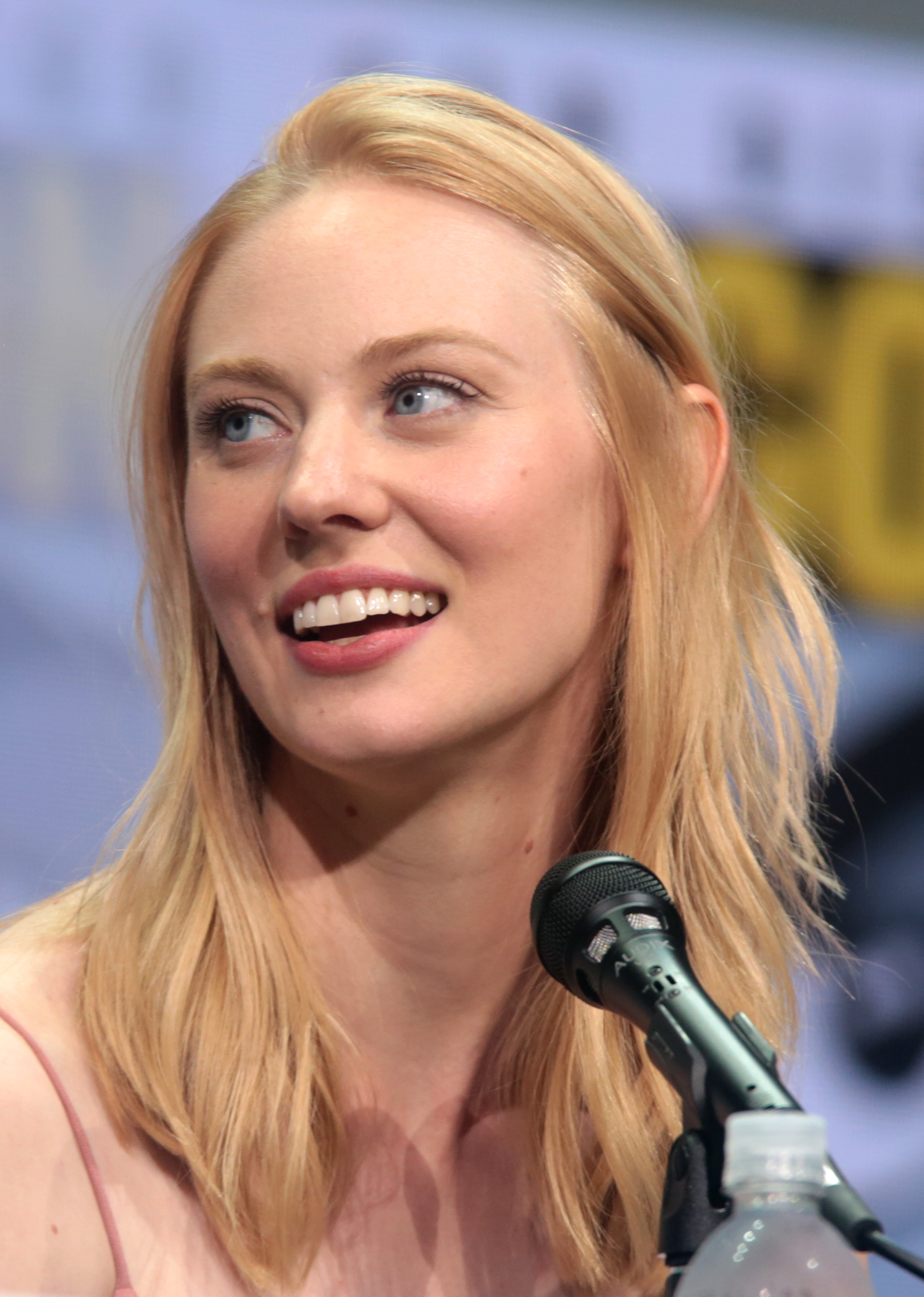
Deborah Ann Woll portrays Jessica Hamby

In her human life, Jessica was raised in a strict, devout Christian family in Shreveport, Louisiana. Jessica and her younger sister Eden were homeschooled and only allowed to go to bible study and clarinet lessons. Her father would often beat Jessica with his belt to punish her for her faults. Jessica's mother was oblivious to this abuse - in a later episode, Jessica attributed this to her mother's "stupidness".^{E-14} Jessica resented the restrictions of her life dearly and secretly developed a rebellious attitude to her father's dominance, it's also hinted that she might have been bullied by peers which might have further increased her frustration with the world around her. Shortly before her appearance in True Blood, she chooses to sneak out after her bible study to attend a friend's party. In events off-screen, she was subsequently attacked and kidnapped by vampires and brought to the scene of a vampire trial, where the Magister, the enforcer of vampire justice, intended to use her as part of a sentence for a vampire on trial.^{E-10}

== Plot synopsis ==
=== Season 1 ===
While she is still human, Jessica is brought to a vampire trial. At this trial, the Magister, enforcer of vampire law, is reviewing the case of Bill Compton, who murdered another vampire that was trying to kill his girlfriend, Sookie Stackhouse. The Magister decides that as a punishment for his deeds, Bill is sentenced to replenishing their numbers by converting Jessica. Bill is reluctant but willingly goes along with the sentence as the Magister would torture her and make him watch, draining the struggling Jessica of all her blood and burying her underground with him for one night. This process transforms Jessica into a vampire successfully, but she is under the reign of her "maker", Bill to which she does not take kindly. Jessica is initially saddened at the fact that she can never go back to her family and live a normal life, but immediately cheers over her new-found freedom and enhanced abilities.^{E-10} Bill teaches her to drink synthetic blood, as opposed to human blood, but Jessica does not like the synthetic blood. Eventually, she becomes such an obstacle to Bill that he leaves her to his vampire sheriff, Eric Northman, who she is attracted to, excited at the fact that she gets to feed off humans and spend time with him she agrees. But Eric grows tired of her as well and once again leaves her with Bill.

=== Season 2 ===
Sookie befriends Jessica and they bond over the grief they feel after having lost their family. Jessica feigns sympathy and convinces Sookie to take her to see Jessica's family, but Jessica enters her old home, going against what she promised to Sookie, and confronts her father when he prepares to strike her with his belt in retaliation for being away for so long. Jessica states that her family is sick and that she desires to kill her father, but Bill intervenes and saves Jessica's family from harm, later erasing their memories and realizing her human life is over.^{E-14} After this, Jessica gradually begins to understand how to be a good vampire and starts a relationship with a human from Bill's hometown, named Hoyt Fortenberry.^{E-15} At the Carmilla Hotel, both of them admit that they are still virgins and Hoyt covers the bed with rose petals, before the two finally make love. Later, in the series, as Jessica starts to have sex with Hoyt, she realizes that her hymen has regenerated to its virginal state and she will always be a "vampire virgin". They break up briefly, because of a conflict between Jessica and Hoyt's overbearing mother, Maxine, who is prejudiced against vampires, but eventually reconcile.

=== Season 3 ===
Jessica drains a trucker, killing him. She quickly regrets it and tries to heal him, but it does not work at all. Jessica is confronted by a vampire, named Franklin Mott, who pulls the trucker's severed head from a paper bag. He tells Jessica that he will help keep the corpse a secret in exchange for information on Bill. Jessica is hired by Sam as a hostess at Merlotte's. While working, Jessica runs into Chip, an old classmate from Bible study. He is stunned to see her alive since her parents have been telling people that she is dead. Jessica glamours Chip and convinces him that he never saw her. After a fight with Arlene, Jessica glamours all her customers not to tip her. She later regrets it and glamours the last customer into giving Arlene a big tip, after Jessica successfully feeds on the woman, without harming her.

After Bill returns to Bon Temps, he releases her as her maker. But Jessica not wanting to be alone, declines to leave. The two reconcile and Bill trains Jessica to fight vampires, and werewolves. Later, that, night, Jessica and Bill fight two werewolves in Sookie's house. After one escapes outside, Jessica follows him. She is captured by Russell, who bites her in front of Bill. He convinces Russell to let her go. Jessica captured the werewolf and drank from him. Hoyt shows up at Merlotte's with his new girlfriend, Summer and the couple are seated by a visibly upset Jessica. Hoyt tells Jessica that he still has feelings for her and does not like Summer at all. Jessica becomes emotional and Tommy Mickens only sees the end of the conversation which adds to his hatred of Hoyt. Hoyt tells Jessica that he loves her before he leaves Merlottes. As he leaves, he is attacked by Tommy, who has shifted into his dog form. Jessica comes to the rescue, telling Hoyt she loves him too. Injured, Hoyt drinks from Jessica so his wounds will heal.

After Russell's appearance on TBBN, humans burn a cross on Bill and Jessica's front lawn. Jessica wants to hunt them down, but Bill convinces her that now is not the time for revenge. Jessica and Hoyt get back together. They tell each other how badly they missed one another. When things start getting serious, Jessica tells him about killing the trucker. She explains that she is not going to stop drinking human blood and Hoyt immediately offers his own neck. Jessica goes right for it and Hoyt seems to like the experience. At the end of the season she is seen moving into a small house with Hoyt. The camera pans away to show a small voodoo-like doll on the floor. Maxine and Summer are also seen purchasing guns, and wooden bullets at a near by gun shop.

=== Season 4 ===
Jessica and Hoyt are seen living together for over a year. After working all day, Hoyt becomes angry with Jessica for not cooking him dinner, and really does not like how dependent Hoyt is toward her at all, but he reminds her that she lives in his home and she feeds on him. The brief fight ends with the two laughing over a plate of uncooked eggs. Later, Hoyt brings Jessica to Fangtasia for a date night. Jessica flirts with other men which Pam describes as "you have been eye fucking every fang banger in the place".

Jessica has the urge to go back to Fangtasia. She leaves to buy Hoyt some Advil, but after seeing a sign to Shreveport, she heads to Fangtasia. As soon as she enters, she approaches the young guy she saw while there with Hoyt. She feeds on him in the bathroom. Sookie, who is also there, confronts Jessica. She quickly tells Sookie to mind her own business.

Feeling guilty for biting another human, Jessica goes to Bill for advice. She returns home to tell Hoyt the truth. Hurt and angry, Hoyt and Jessica argue before she decides to glamour him into forgetting.

In a later episode, Hoyt and Jessica find Jason had passed out and injured on the side of a road. Jessica quickly helps him by giving him her blood, healing him. Because she gave him her blood she is able to sense him and how he is feeling. In episode 6 of season 4 Jessica finds Jason in the woods panicked about turning into a werepanther, which he does not turn into in the end, after Sookie discovers from Alcide that Humans cannot transform into werewolves or panthers like vampires. She helps calm him down and talks to him for a while. The two part ways sometime later, but it is obvious that there is something going on between them, unspoken tension. Jessica later breaks up with Hoyt and moves back into Bill's house. Jason later comes by to drop off a box of Jessica's things from Hoyt's and they end up having sex in the back of Jason's pick up truck.

On Halloween night, Jessica shows up on Jason's doorstep dressed in a sexy Halloween costume and the two make love but not form a relationship, although Jason boosts her confidence.

=== Season 5 ===
Jason is glamoured into listening to newly vampire Steve Newlin's story; he is gay and claims to be in love with Jason, who wants nothing to do with Newlin. Angered, Newlin attacks Jason and tries to bite him. Jessica then appears and threatens Newlin by saying that she has claimed Jason. Later, while partying with College students, when Jason comes in, still having feelings for her. After playing Guitar Hero, Jason tries to make a move on Jessica, but she rejects him, and makes out with a college guy, making Jason jealous. Jason then brings one of the girls with him to have sex, but instead takes her to her home, while Jessica watches him leave, wordless. Jessica develops a personality similar to Pam's such as dressing sexy, talking down to others and hitting on as many guys as she can, relishing at the fact that she is the Princess of Louisiana and all the privileges that come with it. Jessica tries to befriend the newly turned Tara Thornton, but the two come to blows over Tara's attempt to go too far drinking Hoyt, who has become a "fang banger".

While at Fangtasia another night, she is seduced by a young man and leaves the bar with him. She is then captured by a human supremacists group, who have been responsible for the recent killings of super natural beings. Hoyt, who unknowingly became friends with members of the group, is brought in to kill Jessica for breaking his heart. They are locked in a room together with a guard outside; making it impossible to escape unless Hoyt kills her. There Jessica admits that she no longer loved him when she cheated on him with Jason and might never love him again. Hoyt shoots the gun so that the guard will open the door and Jessica is able to break the guard's neck. Hoyt goes to get help, as Jessica cannot leave during the day and she thanks him for not killing her, and Hoyt threatens to kill her for real if he sees her again. After both Hoyt and Sookie are rescued from the hate group, Hoyt tells Jason and Jessica that he plans to move to Alaska to start a new life, but wants Jessica to glamour him first. Tearfully, Jessica erases all of Hoyt's memories of his friendship with Jason and their relationship as well. She then goes back to Bill's house.

=== Season 6 ===
After invading the Authority's hideout, Jessica returns to Sookie's home with Bill, now with Lillth's blood in him waiting for them, after torturing her into summoning her, he attacks Eric, only for Sookie to stake him to no prevail, but Bill claims to come in peace and Sookie unhinged tells him to stay away from Jessica if he is being genuine. To their surprise, Jessica sides with Bill, kicks them out and agrees to become his advisor. Shortly afterwards, Bill has visions of Lilith and goes into a trance as he talks to her. Jessica, thinking Bill is comatose, tries to get him something to eat by calling a female prostitute, Veronica, so that Bill can feed from her. Jessica can only watch in horror as Bill telekinetically contorts the woman's body in unspeakable ways, then siphons her blood through the air from her mouth until she is nothing more than a withered husk, at which point he goes comatose again.

After some coaxing and pleading, Bill lets Jessica help him with his plans by having her abduct Hido Takahashi, a college professor, who is rumored to have been the creator of Tru Blood, as well as Andy Bellefleur's faerie daughters. Jessica attempts to entertain the four halfling daughters, but the girls quickly grow restless and bored. They tell Jessica that they want to leave, but she tries to hold them there, knowing that Bill still needs their blood for synthesizing. One of the girls tries to push past Jessica, but Jessica stops her. The close proximity of the faerie blood causes Jessica to become insane with bloodlust, and she ends up killing three of the four. Horrified by what she has done, Jessica runs to Jason. Unbeknownst to her, Jason has been sleeping with Sarah Newlin, who arranges for Governor Burrell's LAVTF to capture Jessica and throw her in his vampire concentration camp, after she threatened to sexually assault her.

Upon arrival, Jessica unintentionally almost causes a riot by refusing her vial of Tru Blood during feeding time. Tara stands her ground and defends Jessica, but the frenzy subsides, when a woman, who obviously holds power in the unit orders the other girls to leave Jessica alone. Later, she is sent to a room where she must have sex with another vampire, named James, under Sarah's orders while Jason watches but he ultimately refuses and gets zapped with UV light and gets his fangs removed. Jessica is thankful to James and they have consensual sex, during which she unintentionally spouts out Sarah's plan to exterminate the entire vampire race through poisoning the TruBlood. Sarah finds out and sends Jessica to the white room to meet the sun. Bill saves her and the other vampire prisoners at the last moment with his new ability to daywalk, and supplies them with faerie blood to keep them alive, at the cost of his own powers.

== Relationships ==
=== Bill Compton ===
Bill is Jessica's maker, but they do not have a good start. He was reluctant to "create" her, and she does not find him a good vampire mentor. She calls him "boring" and voices concerns that he is suppressing her potential as a true vampire. Over time, she learns to follow his commands, and he teaches her how to "glamour", very effective vampire hypnosis techniques, best feeding practices, and broad combat skills. As he disappears at the beginning of season 3, Jessica is very frightened and lost and displays great relief upon Bill's return. Eventually, Bill does start to care for Jessica and saves her life. In season 4, Jessica often publicly refers to Bill as her "father". Their relation subsequently remains the same throughout the series. In Season 7, despite his having released her, they maintain a close maker and progeny dynamic.

=== Hoyt Fortenberry ===
Jessica meets Hoyt, a road crew worker, in the bar of Bill's hometown, Merlotte's. They have a conversation at the bar, then meet up at Bill's house, where Jessica lives. Jessica is very straightforward about her sexual desires, but Hoyt is a little reluctant. Bill breaks the duo up and forbids them from seeing each other, but as he takes Jessica with him on a trip to Dallas, Hoyt eventually shows up at Jessica's door and they ignite their romance. Jessica comes into conflict with Hoyt's overbearing mother Maxine, who disapproves of their relationship and is prejudiced against vampires. Later on, Maxine comes under the influence of a maenad and loses her limitations, after which she starts dishing out her true opinion on Jessica. Jessica attacks her, so Hoyt breaks up with her. In Season 3 he attempts to get back together with her but she refuses, as she is afraid of her vampire nature. But after she saves Hoyt from an attack by a shapeshifter, they reconcile. They take their relationship to the next level; Hoyt tells Jessica he intends to marry her, and the two move in together in a new house. But in season 4, a year into their relationship it has deteriorated. Hoyt and Jessica both have different needs and Jessica cheats on Hoyt twice (first with a random fangbanger, then by kissing Jason after he saved her life). Jessica contemplates leaving Hoyt, but when she does, he reacts angrily and cruelly reminds her of her shortcomings, such as her inability to have children, before kicking her out. She tries to seek Jason's help, but he rejects her also as he chooses his best friend's, Hoyt's side. Jason eventually gives in to his feelings for Jessica, which earns the enmity of both Hoyt and Jason's former friends. Struggling with the pain of the breakup, Hoyt eventually asks Jessica to "glamour" or hypnotize away all his memories of her and Jason before he moves to Alaska. Hoyt returns in season 7, with his new girlfriend, Brigette. He meets Jessica again after saving her life from a sadistic vampire named Violet. She eventually falls for him again and tells him their story, accepting responsibility for the failure of their first relationship. Hoyt again has feelings for her, despite having only just "met" her. Jessica and Hoyt are married shortly after.

=== Jason Stackhouse ===
In season 4, Jessica begins to show interest in Jason Stackhouse. After Jason escapes from Hotshot, Jessica and Hoyt find him. Jessica gives Jason her blood to heal him, which causes him to develop romantic and sexual feelings for her. She comes to his rescue as he is in the woods, with a full moon and later on, he saves her as she is about to meet the sun under a witch' curse. Jason rejects Jessica after she breaks up, with his best friend Hoyt, but later, on they give into their feelings and have sex. Afterward, Jason confesses that, he feels guilty for betraying Hoyt, briefly souring their relationship. After Jason is nearly killed in an explosion and is again saved, by drinking Jessica's blood, the two reconcile. On Halloween night Jessica comes to Jason's house and seduces him; later, she tells Jason that, she does not want to enter into a boyfriend and girlfriend relationship, at least not yet, which Jason reluctantly agrees to. Their relationship ultimately ends as what they describe as a "beautiful friendship", when she is reunited with Hoyt and eventually marries him.
