= Forever (2015 film) =

- Directed by: Tatia Pilieva
- Written by: Tatia Pilieva; Gill Dennis
- Produced by: Jennifer Kirsten Howell; Morgan Marling
- Starring: Deborah Ann Woll; Luke Grimes; John Diehl; Rhys Coiro; Jill Larson; Ioan Gruffudd
- Cinematography: Andre Lascaris
- Edited by: Garret Price
- Distributed by: Monterey Media
- Release date: September 25, 2015
- Country: United States
- Language: English

Forever is a 2015 American independent drama film directed by Tatia Pilieva and written by Pilieva and Gill Dennis, starring Deborah Ann Woll, Luke Grimes, John Diehl, Rhys Coiro, Jill Larson, and Ioan Gruffudd.

== Plot ==
Alice is a young investigative reporter who suffers a catastrophic loss when her boyfriend, Tom, commits suicide after the two of them have a fight. She finds it impossible to cope in the real world and goes in search of an isolated community run by a former psychiatrist she learned about as part of a story. She finds the community and infiltrates it by pretending to have forgotten her identity. Alice slowly finds acceptance within the commune and learns that each member has suffered a tremendous loss or trauma, and that the group, despite currently living in joy and harmony, eventually intends to commit mass suicide. One of the residents, Charlie, finds Alice's hidden I.D. card but doesn't expose her lie. The two begin a romantic relationship. After realizing how supported she feels by the group, Alice reveals her identity and pleas the others to let her stay, which they allow.

Alice tries to come to terms with ending her life, but is not fully committed. When the director of the commune, Neil, accidentally ends the life of his sick wife, the group decide that it's time to perform the suicide ritual they were preparing for. Alice tries to convince Charlie to run away and start over with her; he refuses, but tells her she can leave if she wants. However, she decides to stay with him, and the next morning the group prepares to "let go", by lying down on camp beds and setting themselves on fire after taking a poison that will spare their suffering. But as Alice is about to drink the poison cup Neil is giving them, Charlie stops her. He finally agrees to run away with her and assures the group he won't let them be disturbed. The final scene shows Alice and Charlie boarding a train together. On the station bench they were sitting on, the word "forever" has been carved.

== Cast ==
- Deborah Ann Woll as Alice
- Luke Grimes as Charlie
- John Diehl as Neil
- Rhys Coiro as Gordon
- Jill Larson as Rachel
- Seth Gabel as Luke
- Shanola Hampton as Laura
- Jake McLaughlin as Tom
- Ioan Gruffudd as Anthony
- Tom Everett Scott as Fred
- Rain Phoenix as Julie
- Juliette Verroye as Mary

== Production ==
Forever was shot during 2013 in Los Angeles California, and is Tatia Pilieva's debut feature film. The film was produced by The Art of Elysium, which works to make art a catalyst for social change.

== Reception ==
In the Los Angeles Times, Michael Rechtshaffen said the film is "an unpleasant, dramatically inert drama". In his review in The Hollywood Reporter, Frank Scheck said that "while it doesn't quite manage to sustain that same level of tension throughout (...) is an intriguing psychological thriller that bears attention."
