= True Blood =

American fantasy drama television series

- Genre: Fantasy drama; Supernatural horror
- Created by: Alan Ball
- Based on: The Southern Vampire Mysteries by Charlaine Harris
- Showrunners: Alan Ball (seasons 1–5); Brian Buckner (seasons 6–7)
- Starring: Anna Paquin; Stephen Moyer; Alexander Skarsgård; Sam Trammell; Ryan Kwanten; Rutina Wesley; Nelsan Ellis; Jim Parrack; Chris Bauer; Carrie Preston; Todd Lowe; Deborah Ann Woll; Kristin Bauer van Straten; Lauren Bowles; Joe Manganiello
- Theme music composer: Jace Everett
- Opening theme: "Bad Things" by Jace Everett
- Composer: Nathan Barr
- Country of origin: United States
- Original language: English
- No. of seasons: 7
- No. of episodes: 80 (list of episodes)

Production
- Executive producers: Alan Ball; Gregg Fienberg; Brian Buckner; Raelle Tucker; Alexander Woo; Nancy Oliver; Mark Hudis; Angela Robinson
- Producers: Bruce Dunn; W. Mark McNair; Carol Dunn Tussell
- Running time: 45–64 minutes
- Production companies: Your Face Goes Here Entertainment; HBO Entertainment

Original release
- Network: HBO
- Release: September 7, 2008 – August 24, 2014

True Blood is an American fantasy horror drama television series produced and created by Alan Ball. It is based on The Southern Vampire Mysteries, a series of novels by Charlaine Harris.

The series revolves around Sookie Stackhouse (Anna Paquin), a telepathic waitress living in the fictional rural town of Bon Temps, Louisiana. It is set two years after the invention of a synthetic blood product branded "Tru Blood" that has allowed vampires to "come out of the coffin" and let their presence be known to mankind. It chronicles the vampires' struggle for equal rights and assimilation while anti-vampire organizations begin to gain power. Sookie's world is turned upside down when she falls in love with 174-year-old vampire Bill Compton (Stephen Moyer), and for the first time, she must navigate the trials and terrors of intimacy and relationships.

The show was broadcast on the premium cable network HBO, in the United States, and was produced by HBO in association with Ball's production company, Your Face Goes Here Entertainment. The series premiered on September 7, 2008, and concluded on August 24, 2014, comprising seven seasons and 80 episodes. The first five seasons received highly positive reviews, and both nominations and wins for several awards, including a Golden Globe and an Emmy.

== Series overview ==
Season	Episodes	Originally released	
Season	Episodes	First released	Last released
1	12	September 7, 2008	November 23, 2008
2	12	June 14, 2009	September 13, 2009
3	12	June 13, 2010	September 12, 2010
4	12	June 26, 2011	September 11, 2011
5	12	June 10, 2012	August 26, 2012
6	10	June 16, 2013	August 18, 2013
7	10	June 22, 2014	August 24, 2014

The series is set in a fictional universe where vampires have always existed, unbeknownst to the majority of humans until two years before the series premiere, when the creation of synthetic blood ("Tru Blood") by Japanese scientists, which eliminated vampires' need for human blood to survive, allowed vampires to "come out of the coffin" and reveal their existence to the world.^{E-1} This so-called "Great Revelation" has split vampires into two camps: those who wish to integrate into human society (i.e., "mainstream") by campaigning for citizenship and equal rights,^{E-1} and those who think human-vampire co-existence is impossible, because it conflicts with the inherently predatory and violent nature of vampires. It has also caused similar divisions amongst non-vampires; some believe that vampires should be accepted and granted rights, while others view them as monsters to be destroyed. Throughout the series, other supernatural creatures are introduced, among them shapeshifters, skinwalkers, werewolves, werepanthers, demons, zombies, faeries, witches, and a maenad.

The series revolves around Sookie Stackhouse (Anna Paquin), a telepathic human-faerie hybrid known as a halfling (not to be confused with similarly named, but unrelated creatures found in other fantasy works). Sookie is a waitress at Merlotte's Bar and Grill, owned by Sam Merlotte (Sam Trammell) in the small Louisiana town of Bon Temps. Sam is a shapeshifter, though this secret is kept hidden from most of the town. Other characters include Bill Compton (Stephen Moyer), a 173-year-old vampire who has returned to Bon Temps to take up residence in his former home following the death of his last remaining relative; Tara Thornton (Rutina Wesley), Sookie's tough-talking but insecure best friend; Jason (Ryan Kwanten), Sookie's womanizing brother; Eric Northman (Alexander Skarsgård), a 1,000-year-old vampire and Sheriff of Area 5; and Lafayette Reynolds (Nelsan Ellis), a short order cook, drug dealer, road crew member, and medium.

The show explores several contemporary issues such as the struggle for equal rights, discrimination, and violence against minorities and homosexuals, the problems of drug addiction, the power of faith and religion, the control/influence of the media, the quest for identity, and the importance of family.

== Season synopses ==
=== Season 1 (2008) ===
The main mystery of the first season concerns the murders of women connected to Sookie's brother, Jason. Maudette Pickens and Dawn Green are both strangled shortly after having been alone with him. Though Detective Bellefleur has little doubt that Jason is the killer, the town sheriff does not suspect him. Sookie's grandmother is murdered shortly afterward. After the murders, Jason becomes addicted to vampire blood and has a short relationship with another addict, Amy Burley, which ends when she is murdered as well. The season also focuses on Sookie's relationship with Bill and Sam's relationship with Sookie's friend Tara. Bill explains the rules of being a vampire to Sookie and, after killing a vampire to defend her, is forced to "turn" a young girl named Jessica into a vampire as punishment. The immature Jessica is left under Bill's care and starts to grow up both as a vampire and as a person. In the end, it is revealed that Arlene Fowler's fiancé, Rene Lenier, has been killing women who associate with vampires. Further, he is actually a man named Drew Marshall who created a false identity, complete with a fake Cajun accent. The season ends with the discovery of a body in Detective Andy Bellefleur's car in Merlotte's parking lot.

=== Season 2 (2009) ===
The second season loosely follows the plot of the second novel of The Southern Vampire Mysteries, Living Dead in Dallas. In addition, the character of Sophie-Anne Leclerq, initially introduced in the sixth novel Definitely Dead, was introduced as a major supporting character. The main theme of the season involves the disappearance of Godric, the 2,000-year-old vampire Sheriff of Area 9. Eric enlists Sookie and Bill's aid in finding the ancient vampire in Dallas. Their paths cross Jason's as he seeks to discover meaning in his life with the Fellowship of the Sun, a church dedicated to anti-vampire activities. A second theme concerns a maenad named Maryann who visits Bon Temps after Tara attracts her attention at the end of the first season. Maryann is a figure from Sam's past and knows his true identity as a shapeshifter. Her influence on the town and its residents results in mayhem that grows more destructive as the season progresses. At the end of the season, Bill proposes to Sookie but is kidnapped by unknown assailants when Sookie retreats to the bathroom to consider his proposal.

=== Season 3 (2010) ===
Season 3 loosely follows the plot of the third novel of The Southern Vampire Mysteries, Club Dead, and introduces werewolves to the show's mythology through Alcide, a werewolf hired by Eric to help Sookie find Bill. It also introduces the characters of Russell Edgington, the Vampire King of Mississippi, who wishes to overturn the Vampire Authority. In addition, some characters from the fourth novel Dead to the World are introduced: Crystal Norris as Jason's love interest, her family of werepanthers from Hotshot, and Sookie's "faerie godmother", Claudine. Sookie's heritage as part faerie is also revealed later in the season, a major plot element from the eighth and ninth novels From Dead to Worse and Dead and Gone. This season ends with Jason left to take care of the werepanthers of Hotshot, Tara leaving Bon Temps after a traumatic experience with a vampire, Sookie discovering that Bill was first sent to Bon Temps by the Vampire Queen of Louisiana, Sam shooting his brother, Tommy, and Hoyt and Jessica moving in together. The final cliffhanger involves Claudine taking Sookie away to the land of Faerie.

=== Season 4 (2011) ===
A coven of witches, led by Marnie, poses a threat to vampires when they discover the witches are working on necromancy. Sookie returns to Bon Temps after a year (even though for her she was away for only a few minutes in Faerie) to find Bill as the new King of Louisiana and that her brother and friends had given up hope of finding her. As the series progresses, a powerful necromancer from the 16th century, Antonia, possesses the body of Marnie in order to exact revenge on all vampires. Sookie starts a romance with Eric who has amnesia due to a spell cast by Antonia/Marnie. The witch Antonia eventually realizes the wrongdoing she's caused to innocent people and decides to stop. Yet Marnie, addicted to Antonia's power, binds her against her will to acquire her powers. Subplots include Lafayette's introduction to the world of magic and his abilities as a medium, Sam's family troubles, Alcide and Debbie's troubled relationship, and Jason, Hoyt and Jessica's love triangle. The finale is a series of cliffhangers, including a warning from the ghost of Rene that Terry will cause Arlene trouble, the escape of Russell Edgington, the reappearance of Steve Newlin as a vampire, and the shooting of Tara.

=== Season 5 (2012) ===
The season starts with Sookie and Lafayette asking for Pam to turn Tara into a vampire. Bill and Eric are captured by the Vampire Authority for killing Nan Flanagan. The two are almost sentenced to death by the Guardian, Roman, before revealing that Russell Edgington is alive and free after being released by a mysterious vampire. With the help of Sookie, the team discovers his hiding place and brings him in. Russell and his new vampire-companion, Steve Newlin, along with Salome, and Eric's vampire sister, Nora, redefine the values of the Authority and view humans as nothing more than food: just as Lilith of the Vampire bible wanted. Meanwhile, Alcide deals with his troubled rise to pack-master, Terry learns he is death-cursed after committing a terrible crime during the war in Iraq, while Tara learns how to deal with her newly given life as Pam's progeny. Jason and Sookie discover that their parents were murdered by a vampire named Warlow. Hoyt gets involved with a hate group, then decides to leave for Alaska, just as Andy heads towards life as a family man, and Lafayette tries to deal with the powers given to him by Jesus. The season ends with the Authority leadership being wiped out during the True Blood crisis, and Bill drinking the entirety of the sacred vial of Lilith in front of Sookie and Eric. He soon meets the "true death", but shortly after, he "rises from the blood", as an even more powerful vampire reincarnation of Lilith ("Billith").

=== Season 6 (2013) ===
The sixth season of True Blood premiered on June 16, 2013. After Alan Ball's departure from the series at the end of season 5, Brian Buckner replaced Ball as the show's showrunner. Season six focuses on Bill's abilities after he had drunk Lilith's blood. Sookie and Jason try to find Warlow, the vampire who killed their parents, with a fairy grandfather named Niall who arrives in Bon Temps while Louisiana governor Burrell leads a platform to eradicate the entire vampire race with Sarah Newlin. Sam and Alcide fight for Emma's safety; Terry struggles to live with himself after having killed Patrick; Andy raises his fairy daughters. Eric decides to turn the governor's daughter Willa into a vampire to convince him to stop his campaign, but she is put into a vampire camp by her father along with Eric, Pam, Jessica, and Tara, where they are all supposed to meet the sun according to Bill’s prophecy. Bill asks Sookie for help, who is considering becoming Warlow's vampire-fairy bride after discovering her parents tried to kill her when she was young. Eric has discovered that Sarah Newlin created a virus that kills vampires, later witnessing Dr. Overlark and Governor Burrell infect Nora in front of him. When the vampires are about to meet the sun, Bill offers his blood to them, allowing them to walk in the daylight. The season finishes six months later where Sookie is dating Alcide, Bill has released a book about the effects of drinking Lilith's blood, and Sam being the mayor of Bon Temps and selling his bar to Arlene, and a group of infected vampires heading toward the bar during a human/vampire outdoor night barbecue mixer.

=== Season 7 (2014) ===
The final season premiered on June 22, 2014, with the last episode airing on August 24. In this season, Bon Temps is terrorized by a group of vampires infected with the virus created in the previous season. They kill Tara and kidnap Arlene, Holly, Jane Bodehouse, Kevin and Nicole. Pam travels the world in search of Eric, who is found in France infected by the virus. They return to Bon Temps and help Sookie, Bill, and Jessica rescue the people who were kidnapped, after Sookie and Bill’s first attempt results in Alcide's death and Sookie being infected by the virus which she later transmits to Bill. Eric and Pam search for Sarah Newlin, who supposedly has an antidote for the virus. Several characters encounter closure like Lettie Mae making peace with Tara through visions caused by vampire blood, Jessica and Hoyt getting married after reuniting during the season, Lafayette entering a relationship with Jessica's ex-boyfriend James, and Sam leaving Bon Temps with Nicole. At the end of the series, Bill refuses to take the antidote to heal himself from the virus and asks Sookie to give him the "ultimate kindness". Sookie eventually agrees and strikes Bill's heart with a wooden stick in his grave at Bon Temps cemetery. Pam and Eric successfully sell the new Tru Blood with the antidote. The last scene of the series shows a pregnant Sookie sitting outside at a table full of people on Thanksgiving beside an unknown man. They kiss and drink, and everyone around them appears to be happy.

== Cast ==
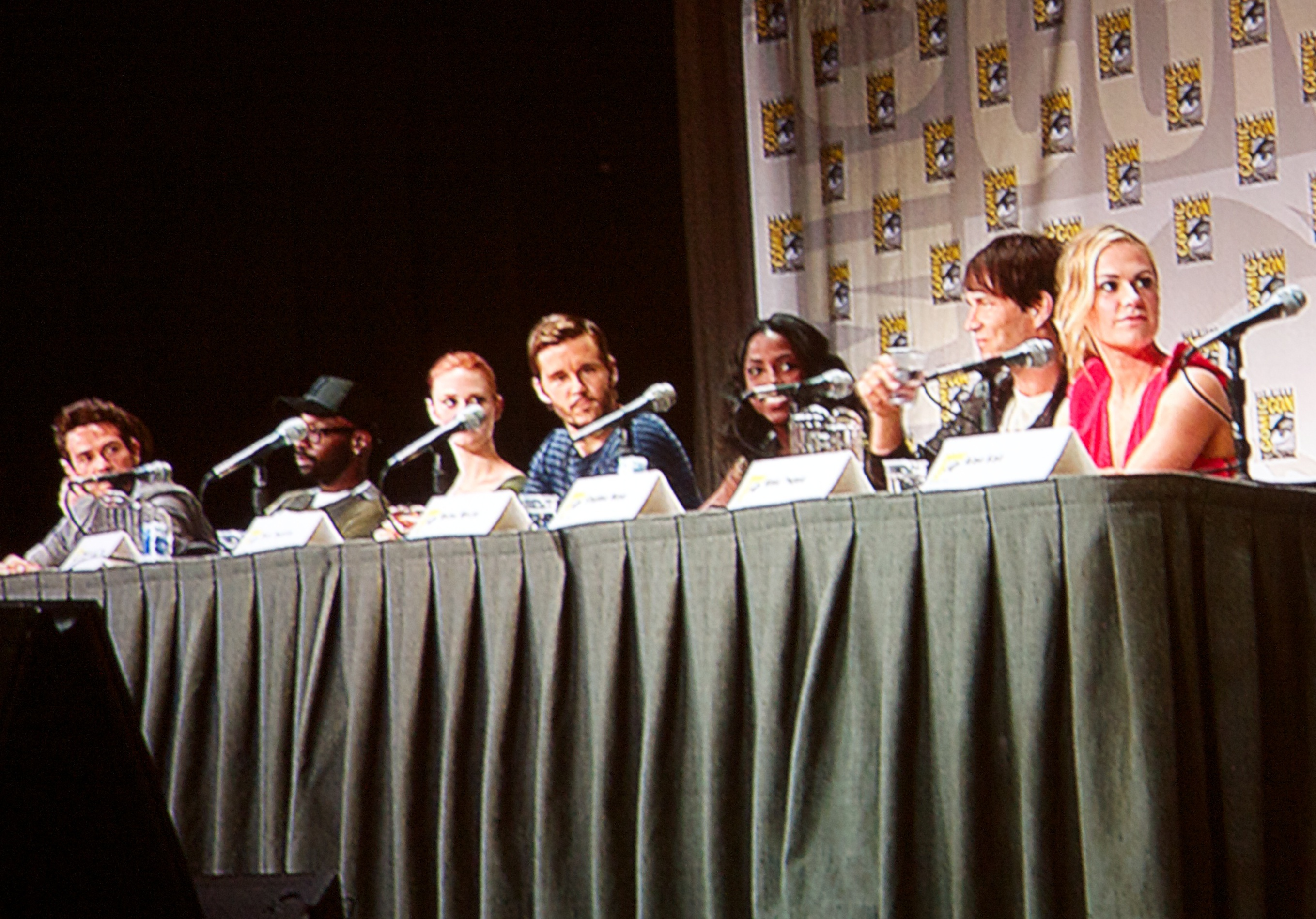
Some of the cast of True Blood at the 2011 Comic-Con.

True Blood employs a broad ensemble cast composed of regular, central characters and a rotating group of impermanent supporting characters. Though the series is based in the fictional town of Bon Temps, Louisiana, a noticeable number of the actors are originally from outside the United States. In an interview, Ball explained that he didn't intentionally seek out "non-American" actors, but was willing to go anywhere he needed to in order "to find the actor who makes the character breathe". Ball went on to explain that, in casting, there was more of a focus on who would portray the character in a compelling way rather than who would physically resemble the characters from the book. Noting that there's a definite difference between the characters and storylines portrayed in True Blood and the ones depicted in The Southern Vampire Mysteries, he described Harris as being very understanding in terms of how her work was being reinterpreted.

=== Main characters ===
Actor	Character	Seasons						
Actor	Character	1	2	3	4	5	6	7
Anna Paquin	Sookie Stackhouse	Main	Main	Main	Main	Main	Main	Main
Stephen Moyer	Bill Compton	Main	Main	Main	Main	Main	Main	Main
Sam Trammell	Sam Merlotte	Main	Main	Main	Main	Main	Main	Main
Ryan Kwanten	Jason Stackhouse	Main	Main	Main	Main	Main	Main	Main
Rutina Wesley	Tara Thornton	Main	Main	Main	Main	Main	Main	Main
Chris Bauer	Andy Bellefleur	Main	Main	Main	Main	Main	Main	Main
Nelsan Ellis	Lafayette Reynolds	Main	Main	Main	Main	Main	Main	Main
Jim Parrack	Hoyt Fortenberry	Main	Main	Main	Main	Main		Main
Carrie Preston	Arlene Fowler Bellefleur	Main	Main	Main	Main	Main	Main	Main
Michael Raymond-James	Rene Lenier / Drew Marshall	Main		Special Guest	Special Guest			
William Sanderson	Bud Dearborne	Main	Main	Main		Special Guest		
Lynn Collins	Dawn Green	Main						
Lois Smith	Adele Stackhouse	Main			Special Guest			Special Guest
Adina Porter	Lettie Mae Daniels	Main	Recurring	Recurring	Special Guest	Special Guest	Special Guest	Main
Alexander Skarsgård	Eric Northman	Main	Main	Main	Main	Main	Main	Main
Lizzy Caplan	Amy Burley	Main						
Stephen Root	Eddie Fournier	Main	Special Guest					
Mehcad Brooks	"Eggs" Benedict Talley	Guest	Main					
Anna Camp	Sarah Newlin		Main				Main	Main
Michelle Forbes	Maryann Forrester	Recurring	Main					
Todd Lowe	Terry Bellefleur	Recurring	Main	Main	Main	Main	Main	Special Guest
Michael McMillian	Reverend Steve Newlin	Recurring	Main	Special Guest	Special Guest	Main	Main	Special Guest
Deborah Ann Woll	Jessica Hamby	Recurring	Main	Main	Main	Main	Main	Main
Mariana Klaveno	Lorena Krasiki	Guest	Main	Main		Guest		
Evan Rachel Wood	Sophie-Anne Leclerq		Recurring	Main	Special Guest			
Marshall Allman	Tommy Mickens			Main	Main			
Kristin Bauer van Straten	Pam Swynford de Beaufort	Recurring	Recurring	Main	Main	Main	Main	Main
Kevin Alejandro	Jesús Velásquez			Main	Main	Recurring		
Denis O'Hare	Russell Edgington			Main		Main		
Lindsay Pulsipher	Crystal Norris			Main	Recurring			
Lauren Bowles	Holly Cleary			Recurring	Main	Main	Main	Main
Janina Gavankar	Luna Garza				Main	Main	Special Guest	
Fiona Shaw	Marnie Stonebrook				Main			
Jessica Tuck	Nan Flanagan	Recurring	Guest	Recurring	Main			Special Guest
Joe Manganiello	Alcide Herveaux			Recurring	Main	Main	Main	Main
Scott Foley	Patrick Devins				Special Guest	Main		
Lucy Griffiths	Nora Gainesborough					Main	Main	
Christopher Meloni	Roman Zimojic					Main		
Valentina Cervi	Salome Agrippa					Main		
Rutger Hauer	Niall Brigant						Main	Special Guest
Arliss Howard	Governor Truman Burrell						Main	
Kelly Overton	Rikki Naylor					Recurring	Main	
Robert Patrick	Jackson Herveaux					Recurring	Main	Special Guest
Rob Kazinsky	Macklyn Warlow						Main	
Jurnee Smollett-Bell	Nicole Wright						Main	Main
Amelia Rose Blaire	Willa Burrell						Recurring	Main
Gregg Daniel	Reverend Daniels			Guest	Guest		Guest	Main
Aaron Christian Howles	Rocky Cleary					Guest	Recurring	Main
Noah Matthews	Wade Cleary					Guest	Recurring	Main
Bailey Noble	Adilyn Bellefleur						Recurring	Main
Luke Grimes	James Kent						Recurring	
Nathan Parsons	James Kent							Main
Karolina Wydra	Violet Mazurski						Recurring	Main
Tara Buck	Ginger	Guest	Recurring	Recurring	Recurring	Guest	Recurring	Main

Cast notes

The major characters of the first season of True Blood are introduced among various intertwining plot lines that surround the Bon Temps bar "Merlotte's". The show's main protagonist, Sookie Stackhouse (Anna Paquin), is a telepath and waitress at Merlotte's.^{E-1} In the opening episode she saves Merlotte's first vampire customer, Bill Compton (Stephen Moyer), when a local couple attempts to drain him of his blood (vampire blood is known on the show as a human narcotic: "V" or "V Juice").^{E-1} Through the relationship that develops between Sookie and Bill, the viewer progressively learns more about vampire culture and the limitations of vampire physiology (e.g. susceptibility to silver and the sun).

The major plot of the first season revolves around the murder of several women connected to Sookie's older brother, Jason (Ryan Kwanten).^{E-1} The women murdered include sexual partner Maudette Pickens (Danielle Sapia),^{E-1} on-and-off romantic interest and Merlotte's waitress Dawn Green (Lynn Collins),^{E-3} grandmother Adele (Lois Smith) or simply "Gran",^{E-5} and girlfriend Amy Burley (Lizzy Caplan).^{E-11} Though the viewer is always aware of Jason's innocence in their deaths, Detective Andy Bellefleur (Chris Bauer) targets him as the prime suspect in the investigation he conducts with Sheriff Bud Dearborne (William Sanderson) to identify their killer.^{E-1} Jason's best friends and co-workers, Hoyt Fortenberry (Jim Parrack) and Rene Lenier (Michael Raymond-James) provide him with support despite the turmoil he encounters.^{E-1} Rene, who becomes engaged to Merlotte's waitress Arlene Fowler (Carrie Preston),^{E-8} is eventually exposed as the Bon Temps murderer and is killed in a final confrontation with Sookie.^{E-12}

A secondary plot in the first season (that later develops as the primary storyline in the second) revolves around Sookie's best friend Tara Thornton (Rutina Wesley).^{E-1} In the first episode, Tara is hired as a bartender at Merlotte's by bar owner, shapeshifter,^{E-11} and admirer of Sookie, Sam Merlotte (Sam Trammell),^{E-1} with whom Tara later has a brief relationship.^{E-3} Tara's cousin Lafayette Reynolds (Nelsan Ellis) already works as a cook at Merlotte's^{E-1} (in addition to several other jobs that include road crew, prostitute, and drug dealer)^{E-3} with Andy's cousin and Iraq War veteran, Terry (Todd Lowe).^{E-2} Tara's story is characterized by her relationship with her alcoholic and abusive mother Lettie Mae (Adina Porter)^{E-2} and her own inner "demons".^{E-10} During the season, Lettie Mae achieves sobriety^{E-8} but Tara's life begins to spin out of control. Kicked out of her home and totaling her car in a drunk driving crash,^{E-10} she's taken in by "social worker" Maryann Forrester (Michelle Forbes).^{E-11} While staying with Maryann, Tara is introduced to "Eggs" Benedict Talley (Mehcad Brooks), to whom she becomes attracted.^{E-11}

The final major plotline of the first season revolves around the elements of vampire society that Sookie and Bill's relationship introduce. While trying to prove her brother's innocence in relation to Maudette and Dawn's murders, Bill takes Sookie to the vampire bar "Fangtasia" to investigate. There, Sookie is introduced to Fangtasia's owner and the vampire sheriff of "Area 5" in Louisiana: Eric Northman (Alexander Skarsgård).^{E-4} Eric is immediately interested in Sookie and her strange abilities, but his progeny and assistant Pam (Kristin Bauer) is less impressed.^{E-4} Eric employs Sookie to find a thief in his bar, but the perpetrator (a vampire named Longshadow) attempts to kill Sookie when she reveals his identity. Bill stakes and kills the thief to save her, but has committed a serious crime in killing another vampire.^{E-8} When Bill is tried for his crime, his punishment is to transform 17-year-old Jessica Hamby (Deborah Ann Woll) into a vampire to replace the one he destroyed.^{E-10}

A secondary plotline introduced in the first season (which later becomes a main plotline in Season 2) is that although many humans are attracted to vampires (referred to as "fang bangers") and flock to establishments like Fangtasia, not all people are accepting of the idea that vampires should be given rights equal to mortals in the True Blood universe. During the first season, one of the ways in which anti-vampire sentiment is expressed is through regular televised appearances by the "Fellowship of the Sun",^{E-2} a Dallas-based church that in Season 2 becomes headed by the Reverend Steve Newlin (Michael McMillian)^{E-3} after his father and family are killed in a strange "accident".^{E-2}

During the second season of True Blood, the influence of Maryann Forrester and the conflict between vampires and humans is expanded. Most of the cast from the first season returns and several new main characters are introduced. The same style of interconnected storytelling used in the first season is repeated, with the foremost plot focusing on Maryann Forrester being revealed as a maenad^{E-19} with the power to influence humans.^{E-15} She begins by manipulating Tara and Eggs to achieve her goal of summoning her god to earth,^{E-20} and eventually takes control of almost the entire population of Bon Temps.^{E-22}

While Maryann begins establishing her hold on Bon Temps, Sookie is recruited by Eric^{E-15} to investigate the disappearance of his two-thousand-year-old maker and the Sheriff of Area 9 in Texas: Godric (Allan Hyde).^{E-17} While Sookie is absent from Bon Temps, Sam hires Daphne Landry (Ashley Jones) to join Merlotte's staff.^{E-13} Daphne (who is revealed to also be a shapeshifter^{E-17}) begins a romance with Sam,^{E-16} but is later exposed as working for Maryann.^{E-18} Jason also leaves Bon Temps for Dallas to join the Fellowship of the Sun,^{E-14} which Reverend Newlin has steered in a new militant direction despite the protestations of his wife Sarah (Anna Camp).^{E-13} Godric is discovered in the custody of the Fellowship,^{E-17} and one of Godric's lieutenants, Isabel Beaumont (Valerie Cruz),^{E-17} sends her human boyfriend Hugo (Christopher Gartin)^{E-18} to assist Sookie in infiltrating the church. Though Eric's primary interest in Dallas is finding Godric, he also attempts to place himself between Sookie and Bill. To accomplish this, he enlists the aid of Bill's maker Lorena (Mariana Klaveno);^{E-17}, who thus becomes a more prominent contribution to the cast after a brief introduction in the first season.^{E-5} In the penultimate episode of the second season, once the conflict in Texas is concluded, the vampire queen of Louisiana Sophie-Anne Leclerq (Evan Rachel Wood) is introduced.^{E-23} Both Bill and Eric visit her in an attempt to find out how to defeat Maryann.^{E-23}

Season three picks up straight after the events of season two with Sookie on the hunt to track down Bill and his kidnappers. She turns to Eric for help, who is not interested (seeing this turn of events as a chance to get Sookie for himself), but he ends up sending werewolf Alcide Herveaux (Joe Manganiello) for assistance after it is revealed that Bill was taken by V-addicted werewolves in the employ of the 3000-year-old vampire king of Mississippi, Russell Edgington (Denis O'Hare). Meanwhile, back in Bon Temps, Lafayette embarks on a relationship with his mother's care nurse and brujo Jesús Velasquez (Kevin Alejandro) and learns about his own special powers as a medium, while Sam hires a new waitress at Merlotte's, Wiccan Holly Cleary (Lauren Bowles).

In season 4, Jessica Tuck (Nan Flanagan) and Janina Gavankar (Luna) became season regulars. Alexandra Breckenridge (Kate) and Vedette Lim (Naomi) became recurring actresses.

Joining the cast for season five was Christopher Meloni, who previously starred on another of HBO's own original series Oz as well as Law & Order: Special Victims Unit for 12 years. Also joining the cast is Scott Foley as Patrick, Terry's old war buddy, Louis Herthum as JD, Kelly Overton as Rikki, a new werewolf curious how Marcus died, Carolyn Hennesy was seen as Rosalyn Harris, a Texas vampire with twang, and Jacob Hopkins will play child vampire Chancellor Alexander Drew.

For season six, it was announced that Robert Kazinsky would join the principal cast as Ben, a faerie and a potential love interest for Sookie. He will also help Sookie and Jason discover the truth about their parents' murders. Robert Patrick, who guest starred in season five as Jackson Herveaux, was promoted to series regular for season six. Rutger Hauer, who starred in Blade Runner and Batman Begins, was announced as a series regular playing Macklyn, a character with "strong ties to Sookie and Jason."

As reported by The Hollywood Reporter, Adina Porter would be returning for the seventh season as a series regular after being credited as a Special Guest Star since season two. Also upgraded to regulars are season six guest stars Amelia Rose Blaire as Willa Burrell, Bailey Noble as Adilyn Bellefleur, Luke Grimes as James and Karolina Wydra as Violet Mazurski.

== Production ==
=== Development history ===
Series creator Alan Ball had previously worked with the cable channel HBO on Six Feet Under, which ran for five seasons. In October 2005, after Six Feet Under wrapped, Ball signed a two-year agreement with HBO to develop and produce original programming for the network. True Blood became the first project under the deal after Ball became acquainted with Charlaine Harris's Southern Vampire Mystery books. One day, while early for a dental appointment, Ball was browsing through a Barnes & Noble bookshop and came across Dead Until Dark (2001), the first installment in Harris' series. He read the entries that followed and became interested in "bringing [Harris'] vision to television". Having already had two other adaptation options for the books, Harris said she chose to work with him, though, because "[Ball] really 'got' me. That's how he convinced me to go with him. I just felt that he understood what I was doing with the books."

The project's hour-long pilot was ordered concurrently with the completion of the development deal. It was written, directed, and produced by Ball. Cast members Paquin, Kwanten, and Trammell were announced in February 2007, and Moyer later in April. The pilot was shot in the early summer of 2007 and was officially ordered to series in August, at which point Ball had already written more episodes. Production on the series began later that fall, with Brook Kerr, who portrayed Tara Thornton in the original pilot, replaced by Rutina Wesley. Two more episodes of the series had been filmed before the 2007-08 Writers Guild of America strike shut down production of the 12-episode first season until February 2008. That September, after only the first two episodes of the series had aired, HBO placed an order for a second season of 12 episodes, with production scheduled to commence in January 2009 for a summer premiere.

=== Title sequence ===
True Blood's Emmy-nominated title sequence is composed of portrayals of the show's Deep South setting, and runs to "Bad Things" by Jace Everett. The original featurette was created around the Jennifer Herrema (Royal Trux) song "RadTimesXpress".

The makers of the title sequence wanted to explore themes of redemption and forgiveness.

Conceptually, the sequence was constructed around the idea of "the whore in the house of prayer" by intermingling contradictory images of sex, violence, and religion and displaying them from the point of view of "a supernatural, predatory creature observing human beings from the shadows ..." Ideas of redemption and forgiveness are also explored, and thus the sequence progresses from morning to night and culminates in a baptism.

The title sequence was created by the independent film company Digital Kitchen. The sequence also features images and themes of death and rebirth; the circle of life. A Venus fly-trap can be seen engulfing a frog, while the rotting of a fox's head is sped up to reveal maggots feeding off the corpse. Rebirth is represented by an image of a woman being "washed clean" from her sins in a lake, and a preacher blessing and possibly performing an exorcism on a member of his congregation.

Some of the footage used in the sequence was filmed on location. Digital Kitchen took a four-day trip to Louisiana to film; it also shot scenes at a Chicago church, and on a stage and in a bar in Seattle. The opening sequence of TRUE BLOOD contains shots that are composed of original documentaries, tabletop photography, studio and found footage which are completely handmade. Creative director Matt Mulder explains that they wanted the edit to “rumble through the swamps, wilderness and the cultures of the South to eventually reach into the hearts and minds of its inhabitants.”

During editing, individual frames were splattered with drops of blood. The sequence's transitions were constructed differently; they were made with a Polaroid transfer technique. The last frame of one shot and the first frame of another were taken as a single Polaroid photo, which was divided between emulsion and backing. The emulsion was filmed being further separated by chemicals, and those shots of this separation were placed back into the final edit. Eight different typefaces, inspired by Southern road signs, were created manually for cast and crew credits, as well as the show's title card.

In a 2010 issue of TV Guide, the show's opening title sequence ranked #5 on a list of TV's top 10 credits sequences, as selected by readers.

=== Music ===
Gary Calamar, who supervises the series' music, said his goal for the show's soundtrack is to create something "swampy, bluesy and spooky" and to feature local Louisiana musicians. True Blood soundtrack albums have twice earned Grammy Award nominations.

Composer Nathan Barr writes the original score for the series, which features the cello, guitar, prepared piano, and glass harmonica among other instruments, all of which he performs himself. The main theme song is "Bad Things" by country music artist Jace Everett, from his 2005 self-titled debut. Both Nathan Barr and Jace Everett won 2009 awards from Broadcast Music Incorporated in the BMI Cable Awards category for, respectively, True Blood's original score and theme song.

The show's individual episode titles are named after songs featured in the episodes, usually heard during the closing credits. The title usually indicates something about the events that will unfold throughout the given episode. For example, episode ten of season four is titled "Burning Down the House", and the end credits feature a cover version of the classic Talking Heads song performed by The Used.

==== Soundtrack albums ====
List of albums, with selected chart positions
Title	Album details	Peak chart positions	
Title	Album details	US	UK DL
True Blood: Music from the HBO Original Series	Released: May 19, 2009; Label: Elektra Records; Formats: Digital download, CD and vinyl	105	90
True Blood: Music from the HBO Original Series, Vol. 2	Released: May 25, 2010; Label: Elektra Records; Formats: Digital download, CD and vinyl	84	—
True Blood: Music from the HBO Original Series, Vol. 3	Released: September 6, 2011; Label: WaterTower Music; Formats: Digital download, CD and vinyl	191	—
True Blood: Music from the HBO Original Series, Vol. 4	Released: May 28, 2013; Label: Ato Records; Formats: Digital download, CD and vinyl	—	—

=== Marketing ===
Promotional poster for second season

The premiere of True Blood was prefaced with a viral marketing/alternate reality game (ARG) campaign, based at BloodCopy.com, throughout the summer. This included setting up multiple websites, encoding web address into unmarked envelopes mailed to high-profile blog writers and others, and even performances by a "vampire" who attempted to reach out to others of their kind, to discuss the recent creation of "TrueBlood", a fictional beverage featured in the show. A MySpace account with the username "Blood" had, as of June 19, uploaded two videos; one entitled "Vampire Taste Test – True Blood vs Human", and one called "BloodCopy Exclusive INTERVIEW WITH SAMSON THE VAMPIRE". A prequel comic was handed out to attendees of the 2008 Comic-Con. The comic centers around an old vampire named Lamar, who tells the reader about how TruBlood surfaced and was discussed between many vampires before going public. At one point, Lamar wonders if TruBlood is making the world safe for vampires or from them. Several commercials featured on HBO and Facebook aired prior to the series premiere, placing vampires in ads similar to those of beer and wine.

HBO produced and broadcast two documentaries to promote True Blood, entitled "True Bloodlines". The first, Vampire Legends, explored the earliest portrayals of vampires in legend, literature, and cinema. The second, A New Type, discusses vampire culture from Nosferatu to today's sensual, sexual creatures. To that end, the show also covered the modern vampire subculture and real-life vampire clubs. Actors and writers from True Blood appeared in the documentaries. The shows first aired on September 6, 2008, on HBO.

Thousands of DVDs of the first episode were handed out to attendees of Midnight Madness, a special film festival. Blockbuster Video provided free rental of the first episode of True Blood several days before it was broadcast on HBO.

On April 16, 2009, HBO released the first teaser poster for season 2. The image uses a perspective technique that shows observers one of two images. A minute-long promotional video advertising season two, which featured Bob Dylan's "Beyond Here Lies Nothin'", was released via Entertainment Tonight in early May. There was also a website for The Fellowship of the Sun, antagonists from the book series, featuring videos about hot-button issues such as becoming a vampire.

In September 2009, HBO filed a trademark registration with the United States Patent and Trademark Office for a possible future electronic game based on True Blood. The network then launched a True Blood jewelry line in collaboration with New York-based designer Udi Behr. Inspired by the series, the jewelry has a Gothic look and features sterling silver, polished steel, and rubies. In the same month, HBO.com began selling Tru:Blood, a beverage branded to resemble the fictional synthetic blood that appears in the show. The beverage is a carbonated blood orange-flavored drink, developed and manufactured by Omni Consumer Products, a company that specializes in defictionalizing brands from television and movies, and FMCG Manufacturing Company, a specialist manufacturer of licensed entertainment products.

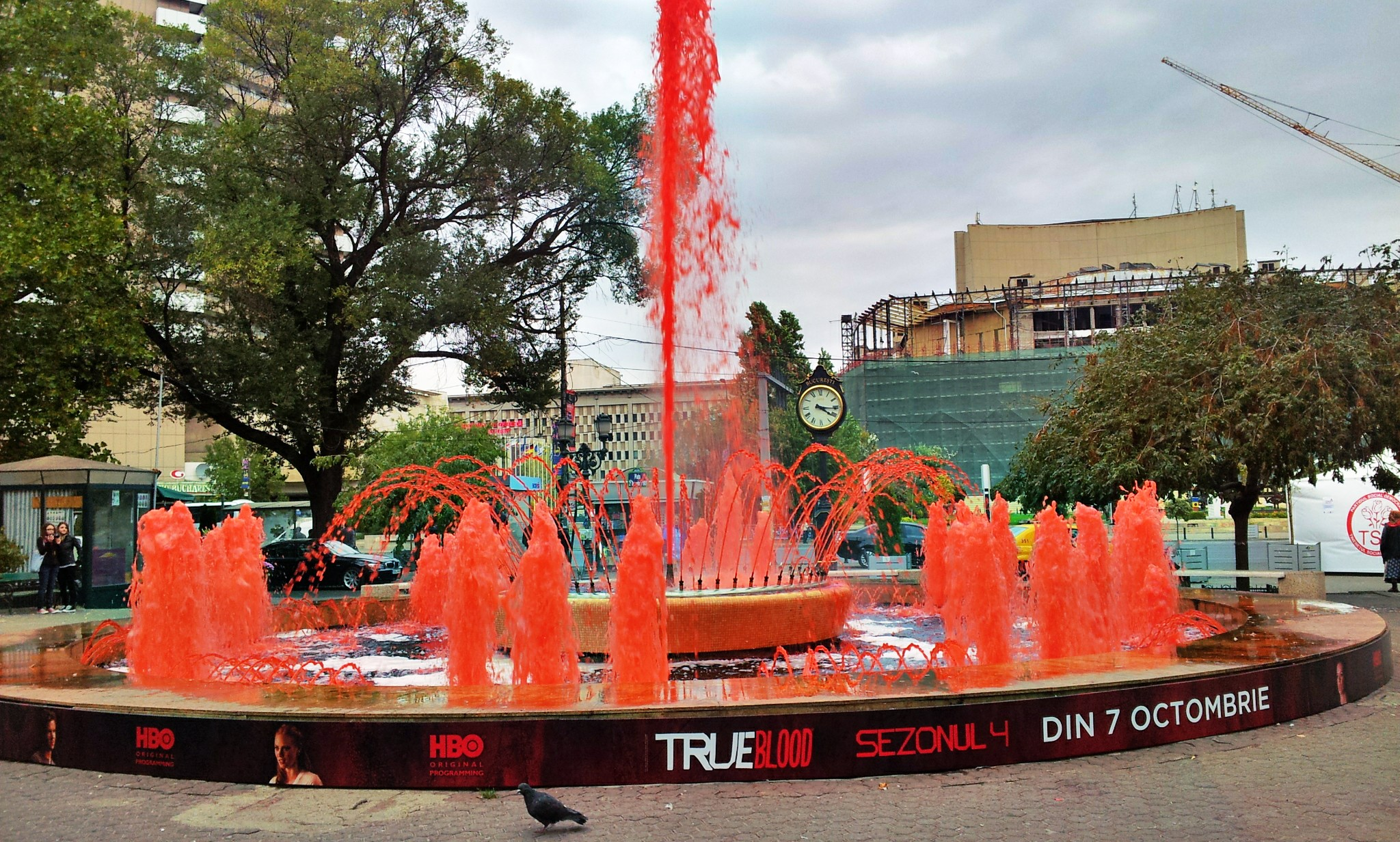
The water in the fountain in Bucharest's University Square was dyed red for the premiere of the 4th season

In June 2010, HBO held a special event at a number of movie theaters around the U.S., complete with red carpet, searchlights, and swag bags. Contest winners were invited to watch a live special, the Season 2 finale, a preview of Season 3, and a live interview on the set of True Blood with the cast and Alan Ball. HBO also began selling True Blood figural busts featuring Bill, Sookie, and Eric. Busts of other characters became available later.

HBO and IDW Publishing announced at the 2010 WonderCon that they would be publishing a comic book based on the series. Alan Ball developed and wrote the comic. The first booklet, with a print run of 53,000, was released in July 2010 and soon sold out. The second issue went on sale August 18, 2010, with a second printing of the first issue going on sale August 25. Six comics were issued in the series, and they were compiled as the graphic novel All Together Now on February 15, 2011. This was the first in a series of four graphic novels released by HBO under the True Blood franchise and sold in major bookstores. Ensuing titles include Tainted Love, The French Quarter, and Ongoing.

== Home media ==
The True Blood DVDs have been consistent best-sellers in the United States. By the end of 2009, the first season DVD had sold over 1.6 million units and taken in over $57 million. It was the only TV show in the 50 top-selling DVDs of 2009. The second season DVD sold a total of 1,159,509 units in 2010, earning over $41 million. The third season DVD was the 61st best-selling DVD of 2011, selling almost 1 million copies and earning over $30 million. It was the best selling TV box set of 2011. In its first week of release—the week ending June 2, 2012—season four debuted at number one on the UK "TV on Video" chart. However, it reached only number six in the combined DVD chart. In its first week of release in North America, it sold over 660,000 units, earning nearly $20 million. In its second week of release in North America, it sold a further 120,000 units (making a combined total of 784,000 units sold), earning another $4 million.

True Blood: The Complete First Season
Set details	Special features	Exclusive items
12 episodes; 5 disc set; 1.78:1 aspect ratio; Subtitles: English; English	In Focus: Vampires in Americas; Tru Blood Beverage Ads; Vampire PSAs; Episode trailers; Audio commentaries on: "Strange Love" by writer/director Alan Ball; "The First Taste" by director Scott Winant and star Anna Paquin; "Escape from Dragon House" by director Michael Lehmann and writer Brian Buckner; "Sparks Fly Out" by director Daniel Minahan and star Stephen Moyer; "Burning House of Love" by director Marcos Siega; "To Love Is to Bury" by writer/director Nancy Oliver	No known exclusives

True Blood: The Complete Second Season
Set details	Special features	Exclusive items
12 episodes; 5 disc set; 1.78:1 aspect ratio; Subtitles: English; English	The Vampire Report: Special Edition; Fellowship of the Sun: Reflections of Light; Episode trailers; Audio commentaries on: "Keep This Party Going" by Nelsan Ellis (Lafayette) and Michael Lehmann (Director); "Release Me" by Raelle Tucker (Writer) and Michael Ruscio (Director); "Timebomb" by Stephen Moyer (Bill), Alexander Skarsgård (Eric) and John Dahl (Director); "New World in My View" by Ryan Kwanten (Jason) and Sam Trammell (Sam); "Frenzy" by Rutina Wesley (Tara), Alan Ball (Writer) and Daniel Minahan (Director); "Beyond Here Lies Nothin'" by Anna Paquin (Sookie) and Michelle Forbes (Maryann); "Beyond Here Lies Nothin'"' by Alexander Woo (Writer) and Michael Cuesta (Director)	USA Target stores; Cast and crew panel DVD

True Blood: The Complete Third Season
Set details	Special features	Exclusive items
12 episodes; 5 disc set; 1.78:1 aspect ratio; Subtitles: English; English	Anatomy of a Scene; True Blood Minisodes; True Blood Postmortems; Snoop Dogg "Oh Sookie" video; Episode trailers; Audio commentaries on: "Beautifully Broken" by Alexander Skarsgård (Eric) and Scott Winant (Director); "It Hurts Me Too" by Alexander Woo (Writer) and Michael Lehmann (Director); "9 Crimes" by Kristin Bauer Van Straten (Pam) and David Petrarca (Director); "I Got a Right to Sing the Blues" by Denis O'Hare (Russell) and Alan Ball (Executive Producer and Creator); "Hitting the Ground" by Anna Paquin (Sookie), Joe Manganiello (Alcide) and Brian Buckner (Writer); "Evil Is Going On" by Stephen Moyer (Bill) and Anthony Hemingway (Director)	USA Target stores; One of 3 cardboard overlays of the 3 main cast members

True Blood: The Complete Fourth Season
Set details	Special features	Exclusive items
12 episodes; 5 disc set; 1.78:1 aspect ratio; Subtitles: English, French, Portuguese, Spanish; English	Inside the Episodes (12 clips); Backstories on each of the episodes – interviews with the show writers; True Blood: The Final Touches – Behind the scenes tour of the post production process of True Blood; 6 audio commentaries with the cast and crew including Alan Ball, Anna Paquin, Stephen Moyer, Alexander Skarsgård, Deborah Ann Woll, Sam Trammell and Fiona Shaw	USA Target stores; Bonus DVD – 80-minute Paley Center panel with Alan Bell and cast
True Blood: The Complete Fifth Season
Set details	Special features	Exclusive items
12 episodes; 5 disc set; 1.78:1 aspect ratio; Subtitles: English, French, Portuguese, Spanish; English	Inside the Episodes: Get the back-stories on each episode with revealing interviews from the show writers.; 5 audio commentaries with the Cast and Crew including Alan Ball, Anna Paquin, Stephen Moyer, Denis O'Hare, Carrie Preston, and many more!; Previews & Recaps; Enhanced Viewing: Character Bios, Vampire Histories, Hints, FYI's, Flashbacks, and Flash Forwards.; Authority Confessionals: Learn more about the mysterious institution known as The Authority, from Nora, Kibwe, Rosalyn, Salome, Steve, and Russell.; True Blood Episode Six: Autopsy: Join the cast and crew as they dissect the major events of episode six and provide an in-depth, behind-the-scenes look at how True Blood is made.; True Blood Lines: Uncover secrets from relationships past and present in this engaging, fully interactive ""re-Vamped"" guide and archive.	No known exclusives
True Blood: The Complete Sixth Season
Set details	Special features	Exclusive items
10 episodes; 4 disc set; 1.78:1 aspect ratio; Subtitles: English, French, Portuguese, Spanish; English	Inside the Episodes (10 clips); Backstories on each of the episodes – interviews with the show writers; 5 audio commentaries with cast and crew including executive producer Brian Buckner, Stephen Moyer, Carrie Preston, Amelia Rose Blaire and more!; Vamp Camp Files – get an inside look at the secret trove of documents detailing the effort to eradicate vampires via the institution known as "Vamp Camp". (Blu-ray only); True Blood Lines – uncover secrets from relationships past and present in this engaging fully interactive guide and archive (Blu-ray only)	No known exclusives
True Blood: The Complete Seventh Season
Set details	Special features	Exclusive items
10 episodes; 4 disc set; 1.78:1 aspect ratio; Subtitles: English, French, Portuguese, Spanish; English	True Death: The Final Days on Set – Witness the final days of True Blood through the eyes of your favorite cast members as they document their experiences on their last times on set. See cast and crew as you have never seen them before, with this exclusive access. Be there as we say goodbye to the town of Bon Temps forever.; True Blood Lines – Uncover secrets from relationships past and present in this engaging fully interactive guide and archive.; True Blood: A Farewell to Bon Temps: Say goodbye to True Blood with this behind-the-scenes special of the series as it enters its seventh and final season.; Five audio commentaries with cast and crew.	No known exclusives

== Reception ==
=== Critical reception ===
Metacritic ratings per season
View chart definition.

Season	1	2	3	4	5	6	7
Rating	63	74	79	74	74	58	54

The series has an approval rating of 70% on the review aggregator website Rotten Tomatoes.

The first season of True Blood received positive reviews, despite initial impressions being mixed. Linda Stasi of the New York Post wrote of the opening episodes:

If HBO's new vampire show is any indication, there would still be countless deaths – especially among vampire hunters and the viewers who love them – because everyone would be dying of boredom. And so it is with HBO's new series from death-obsessed Alan Ball, creator of the legendary Six Feet Under, whose new show True Blood, won't so much make your blood run cold as it will leave you cold.

Robert Bianco of USA Today concluded:

Sexy, witty and unabashedly peculiar, True Blood is a blood-drenched Southern Gothic romantic parable set in a world where vampires are out and about and campaigning for equal rights. Part mystery, part fantasy, part comedy, and all wildly imaginative exaggeration, [True] Blood proves that there's still vibrant life — or death — left in the 'star-crossed cute lovers' paradigm. You just have to know where to stake your romantic claim.

The series achieved its highest Rotten Tomatoes rating of 95%, with an average rating of 8.25/10 based on 22 reviews, during its third season. The critical consensus of the season reads, "True Blood seems to fully understand its appeal, and its third season provides plenty of graphic thrills, steamy romance, and biting satire for its fans." Metacritic, another aggregator of critical responses, found "generally favorable reviews" for the first five seasons, with ratings of 63, 74, 79, 74 and 74, respectively.

The sixth season, notable for being the first of the series not to have Alan Ball as showrunner, was met with mixed reviews in contrast to the acclaim of the previous five seasons. Many critics noted the decreasing quality of the scripts and production values. In his review, Brian Lowry of Variety remarked:

People can debate when “True Blood’s” creative rigor mortis officially set in — somewhere during that stretch when the show began piling one supernatural creature upon another (werewolves and witches and faeries, oh my!) — but suffice it to say this once-significant and hugely lucrative HBO series limps into its seventh and final season looking pretty anemic.

The sixth and seventh seasons each received an approval rating of 44% on Rotten Tomatoes, with the critical consensus of season six reading: "A major letdown coming off the end of season five, True Blood seems to be running out of steam and isn't aging as elegantly as its eternal vampires." On Metacritic, the sixth season rated 58, while the seventh 54, both indicating "mixed or average reviews".

The cast received positive reviews for their performances, with praise going to the performances of Anna Paquin and Nelsan Ellis. For the first season, Anna Paquin won the Best Performance by an Actress in a Television Series – Drama Golden Globe at the 66th Golden Globe Awards; she was also nominated the next year and won the Saturn Award for Best Actress in a Series, Drama at the 13th Satellite Awards, a ceremony in which Nelsan Ellis also won Best Supporting Actor – Series, Miniseries or Television Film. Stephen Moyer won the award for Best Actor on Television at the 2010 ceremony.

=== Cultural influence ===
True Blood was the subject of a Sesame Street sketch parody titled "True Mud" (2010), featuring puppet versions of Sookie, Bill, Lafayette, Sam, Tara, and Sheriff Dearborne. In the skit, Muppet Sookie struggles to fulfill Muppet Bill's pleas for a pint of "True Mud", as the other characters speculate whether or not he is a "grouch".

Anna Paquin (Sookie), Stephen Moyer (Bill), and Alexander Skarsgård (Eric) appeared on the September 2010 cover of Rolling Stone covered in blood and completely naked. This cover drew criticism due to the image's supposed promotion of sexuality and violence. The show's creator, Alan Ball, stated in the magazine, "To me, vampires are sex... I don't get a vampire story about abstinence", referring to the Twilight books and films which were also highly popular at the time but had a more conservative approach to vampires and sexuality. "I'm 53. I don't care about high school students. I find them irritating and uninformed."

Professional wrestler Matt Hardy credits the show as the inspiration for his "Broken" Matt Hardy character.

=== Comparisons to LGBT rights ===
The struggle for vampire equality in True Blood has been interpreted as an allegory for the LGBT rights movement. Charlaine Harris, the author of the book series on which the show is based, stated that her initial characterization for the vampires were as "...a minority that was trying to get equal rights". Several phrases in the series are borrowed and adapted from expressions used against and about LGBT people, such as "God Hates Fangs" (God Hates Fags) and "Coming out of the coffin" (coming out of the closet).

Entertainment Weekly's Ken Tucker wrote that the show is built "around a series of metaphors: Vampire rights stand in for gay rights, and now the clever laughs elicited from this bratty-vampire girl represent an extreme of adolescent rebelliousness". David Bianculli of NPR wrote, "True Blood is big on allegory, and the tension about accepting vampires into society is an obvious play on civil rights in general, and gay rights in particular". However, the series' creator, Alan Ball, who is gay, has stated that such a comparison is lazy and possibly homophobic; and Lauren Gutterman of the Center for Lesbian and Gay Studies has expressed concerns that the show might perpetuate negative stereotypes of homosexuals as deviants.

== Ratings ==
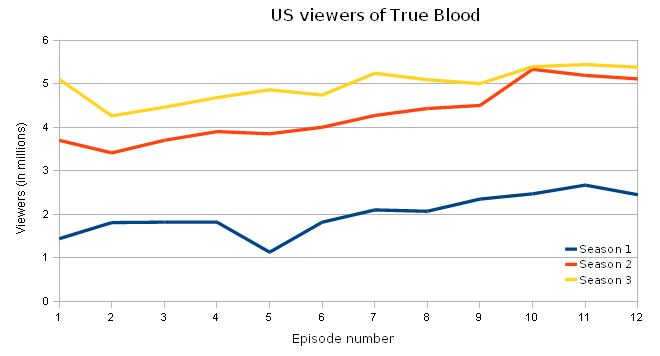
Graph of the US viewing figures of the first three seasons of True Blood.

The first episode of True Blood debuted at a very modest 1.44 million viewers compared to the network's past drama premieres such as Big Love which premiered at 4.56 million, and John from Cincinnati which debuted at 3.4 million. However, by late November 2008, 6.8 million a week were watching: this figure included repeat and on-demand viewings. The season finale's viewership was 2.4 million.

The second-season premiere of the series (June 14, 2009) was viewed by 3.7 million, making it the most watched program on HBO since the series finale of The Sopranos. The total number of viewers for the season premiere, including the late night replay, was 5.1 million. The tenth episode of the second season (August 23, 2009) was seen by 5.3 million viewers, a new record for the series. The second season's finale (September 13, 2009) was seen by 5.1 million viewers. An average of 12.4 million a week watched the second season.

The ninth episode of the fourth season (August 21, 2011) set a new record with 5.53 million viewers, making it the most viewed episode to date.

=== U.S. Nielsen ratings ===
Season	Timeslot (ET/PT)	# Ep.	Premiere		Finale		Aired	Viewers (in millions)
Season	Timeslot (ET/PT)	# Ep.	Date	Premiere Viewers (in millions)	Date	Finale Viewers (in millions)	Aired	Viewers (in millions)
Season 1	Sundays 9:00pm	12	September 7, 2008	1.44	November 23, 2008	2.45	2008	2.00
Season 2	Sundays 9:00pm	12	June 14, 2009	3.70	September 13, 2009	5.11	2009	4.28
Season 3	Sundays 9:00pm	12	June 13, 2010	5.10	September 12, 2010	5.38	2010	4.97
Season 4	Sundays 9:00pm	12	June 26, 2011	5.42	September 11, 2011	5.05	2011	4.97
Season 5	Sundays 9:00pm	12	June 10, 2012	5.20	August 26, 2012	5.05	2012	4.67
Season 6	Sundays 9:00pm	10	June 16, 2013	4.52	August 18, 2013	4.12	2013	4.24
Season 7	Sundays 9:00pm	10	June 22, 2014	4.03	August 24, 2014	4.04	2014	3.48

== Awards and nominations ==
The show won an Outstanding Casting for a Drama at the 61st Primetime Emmy Awards; the two lead actors have both been recognized for their performances:

- Anna Paquin as Sookie Stackhouse, for Best Actress in a Drama at the 13th Satellite Awards
- Stephen Moyer as Bill Compton for Best Actor at the 37th Saturn Awards

The show received an American Film Institute Award in 2009 as "One of the 10 Best TV Programs" and was chosen as "Favorite TV Obsession" at the 36th People's Choice Awards. Its stunt performers have been recognized for Outstanding Performance by a Stunt Ensemble at the 17th Screen Actors Guild Awards.

== Canceled reboot ==
In December 2020, it was announced that HBO was developing a reboot of True Blood. The original series' creator and original showrunner, Alan Ball, was set to executive produce the reboot. In February 2023, HBO CEO Casey Bloys confirmed HBO had developed a few scripts but stated, "nothing that felt like it got there".

== See also ==
- The Southern Vampire Mysteries
- List of vampire television series
- Vampire film
- Vampire literature

== Notes ==
^E-1"Strange Love". True Blood. Season 1. Episode 1. September 7, 2008. HBO.
^E-2"The First Taste". True Blood. Season 1. Episode 2. September 14, 2008. HBO.
^E-3"Mine". True Blood. Season 1. Episode 3. September 21, 2008. HBO.
^E-4"Escape from Dragon House". True Blood. Season 1. Episode 4. September 29, 2008. HBO.
^E-5"Sparks Fly Out". True Blood. Season 1. Episode 5. October 5, 2008. HBO.
^E-8"The Fourth Man in the Fire". True Blood. Season 1. Episode 8. October 26, 2008. HBO.
^E-10"I Don't Wanna Know". True Blood. Season 1. Episode 10. November 9, 2008. HBO.
^E-11"To Love is to Bury". True Blood. Season 1. Episode 11. November 16, 2008. HBO.
^E-12"You'll Be the Death of Me". True Blood. Season 1. Episode 12. November 23, 2008. HBO.
^E-13"Nothing but the Blood". True Blood. Season 2. Episode 13. June 14, 2009. HBO.
^E-14"Keep This Party Going". True Blood. Season 2. Episode 14. June 21, 2009. HBO.
^E-15"Scratches". True Blood. Season 2. Episode 15. June 28, 2009. HBO.
^E-16"Shake and Fingerpop". True Blood. Season 2. Episode 16. July 12, 2009. HBO.
^E-17"Never Let Me Go". True Blood. Season 2. Episode 17. July 19, 2009. HBO.
^E-18"Hard-Hearted Hannah". True Blood. Season 2. Episode 18. July 26, 2009. HBO.
^E-19"Release Me". True Blood. Season 2. Episode 19. August 2, 2009. HBO.
^E-20"Timebomb". True Blood. Season 2. Episode 20. August 9, 2009. HBO.
^E-21"I Will Rise Up". True Blood. Season 2. Episode 21. August 16, 2009. HBO.
^E-22"New World in My View". True Blood. Season 2. Episode 22. August 23, 2009. HBO.
^E-23"Frenzy". True Blood. Season 2. Episode 23. August 30, 2009. HBO.
^E-24"Beyond here Lies Nothing". True Blood. Season 2. Episode 24. September 6, 2009. HBO.
