= Bill Compton (The Southern Vampire Mysteries) =

- The Southern Vampire Mysteries character
- Stephen Moyer as Bill Compton in True Blood.
- First appearance: Novel: Dead Until Dark; Television: "Strange Love"
- Created by: Charlaine Harris
- Portrayed by: Stephen Moyer

In-universe information
- Nicknames: Bill; Vampire Bill
- Species: Vampire
- Occupation: Vampire King of Louisiana; Investigator of Area 5 Compiler of Vampire Database
- Family: Robert Compton (older brother); Sarah Compton (younger sister); Caroline Holliday (granddaughter); Matthew Phillips Holliday (grandson-in-law); Caroline Holliday Bellefleur (great-granddaughter); Andy Bellefleur (great-great-great-grandson); Portia Bellefleur (great-great-great-granddaughter)
- Spouses: Caroline Isabel Compton (human wife)
- Children: Sarah Isabel Compton (daughter; b. 1861); Thomas Charles Compton (son; 1862-1868); Lee Davis Compton (son; 1866-1867); Jessica Hamby (vampire offspring - TV series)
- Relatives: Lorena Ball (Vampire Maker); Judith Vardamon (sired by Lorena - "sister")
- Nationality: American

William Thomas “Bill” Compton is a fictional vampire in The Southern Vampire Mysteries; a series of books by Charlaine Harris. He is introduced in the first novel of the series, Dead Until Dark and has appeared in every subsequent novel. In the television adaptation, True Blood, he was portrayed by the actor Stephen Moyer.

Bill Compton is a vampire and sometimes lover of the series' protagonist, Sookie Stackhouse. He is sometimes referred to as "Vampire Bill" by the locals from the fictional town of Bon Temps, Louisiana.

== Fictional history ==
=== The Southern Vampire Mysteries ===
According to the book series, Bill was born on April 9, 1840. As a human, he lived in Bon Temps. He was a married farmer with several children. Prior to becoming a vampire, Bill was a tax accountant, where he was noted for being an exceptional worker. Bill was a Confederate soldier during the Civil War.

In 1865, a vampire named Lorena turned Bill into a vampire. He continued to have a long and stormy relationship with his maker.

Following the Great Revelation, Bill decides to "mainstream" and co-exist peacefully with humans. He returns to his ancestral home in Bon Temps. Later in the series, after Bill discovers that he is related to the Bellefleur family, he secretly provides them with funding for the repair of their family home.

Following his concerns about the Area Five sheriff, Eric Northman, Bill applies for and is appointed the area's investigator position. Later in the series, Bill is revealed to have been sent to investigate Sookie's telepathic abilities by Queen Sophie-Anne.

While most older vampires have good memories, Bill has an exceptional ability to recall precise details, faces, and conversations. Bill manages and distributes a database of all the vampires in North America. Due to potential security issues, the database is only available for purchase to other vampires.

==== Relationship with Sookie Stackhouse ====
In Dead Until Dark, Sookie saves Bill from being "drained" by a husband and wife seeking to sell his blood for profit. (Vampire blood, colloquially known as "V" in the series, is a highly addictive performance enhancing drug, aphrodisiac, and hallucinogen for humans.) Bill saves Sookie with his blood when the couple seeks revenge later on. Despite the anti-vampire ideals of the Bon Temps locals, Bill and Sookie begin a romantic relationship.

Sookie and Bill's relationship falls apart when his maker, Lorena, entraps him in Mississippi. In Club Dead, the relationship decisively ends when Eric discovers and informs Sookie about Bill's mission to investigate her for the Vampire Queen of Louisiana. After their romantic relationship ends, Bill continues to appear in the novels. He becomes a trusted friend by Dead Reckoning.

=== True Blood ===
Bill first appeared in the “Bon Temps vampire speaks" video posted on BloodCopy.com, one of seventeen official companion websites created to complement the HBO original series True Blood. Bill is one of only four characters to appear in every episode, the other three being protagonist Sookie Stackhouse, her brother Jason, and Merlotte's Bar and Grill short order cook, Lafayette Reynolds.

Bill's storyline in the television show differs significantly from the novels. In the first season, as punishment for staking another vampire, he is forced to create his first progeny by turning a teenage girl (Jessica Hamby) into a vampire.

Bill's maker, Lorena, is staked and killed by Sookie in the third season. When Bill is in desperate need of blood, Sookie slits her arm to feed him. Bill nearly drains her to death. After he is kicked out into the sunlight, Bill learns that faerie blood makes vampires temporarily resistant to the sun.

In the fourth season, Bill becomes the Vampire King of Louisiana after staging a coup d'état against Queen Sophie Anne with the help of the Authority.

He becomes an antagonist throughout much of the fifth and sixth season after drinking the blood of Lilith (known as the Progenitor of the vampire race.) After consuming her blood, Bill is destroyed and resurrected as a more powerful vampire who is: impervious to staking; no longer needs an invitation to enter a human home; and involuntarily experiences visions of the future. He is also able to command Warlow, Lilith's only known progeny and Sookie's then-love interest.

In the final season, Bill becomes infected with "Hepatitus-V": a fatal virus genetically engineered by the human government to exterminate vampires. Rather than taking a cure, Bill chooses to die the "true death." He convinces Sookie to stake him in the grave made for his presumed death during the Civil War. She begrudgingly does so, promising she loves him.

== Portrayal and reception ==
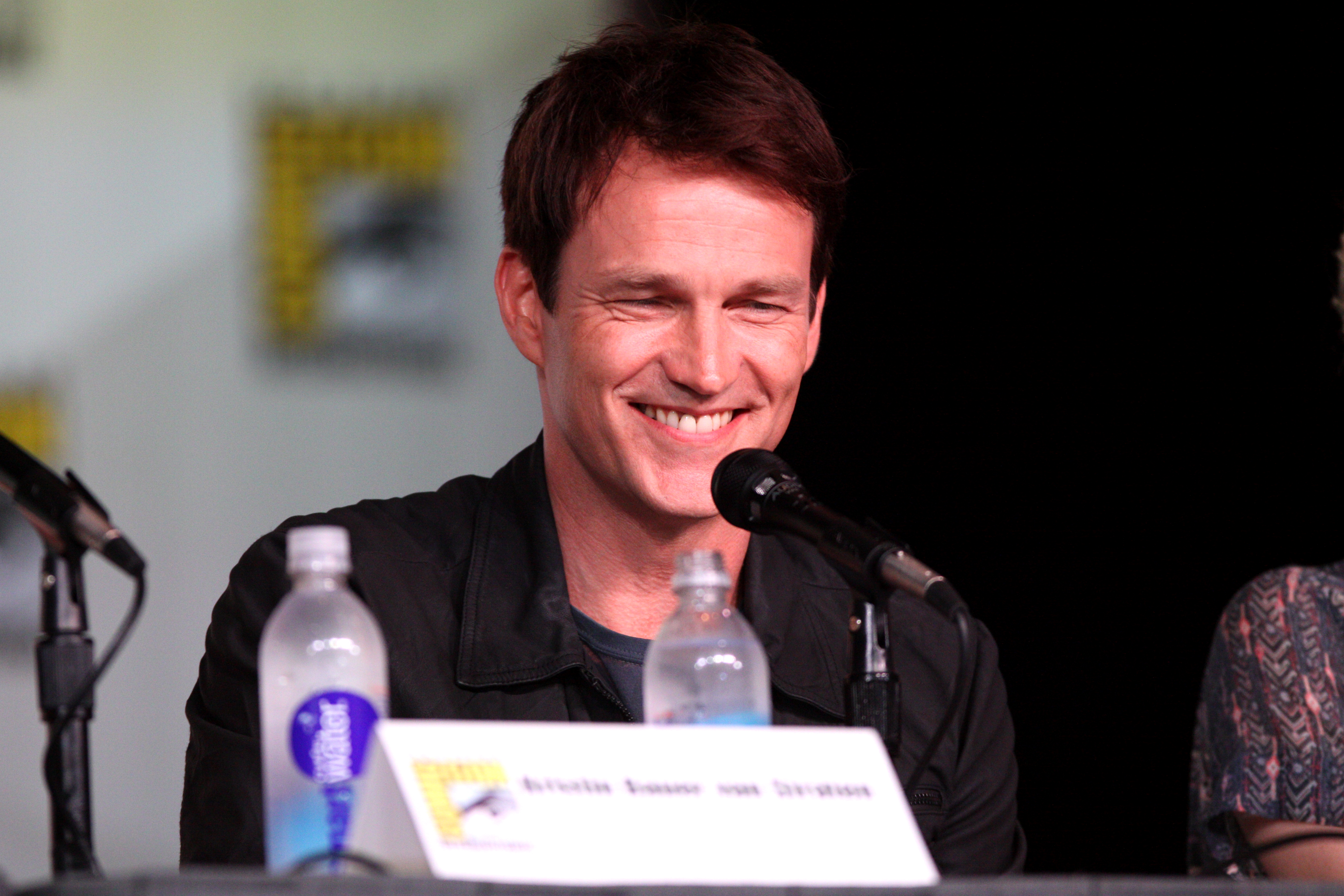
Stephen Moyer speaking at the 2012 San Diego Comic-Con in San Diego, California.

Before Moyer was cast, Benedict Cumberbatch auditioned for the role.

In 2011, actor Stephen Moyer won the Saturn Award for Best Actor on Television for his portrayal of Bill Compton on True Blood.

"It’s no accident [that Bill] kills as many people in the first season as a murderer. He’s a killer. He can’t help himself," said actor Stephen Moyer. "He’s also a man who has lost everything; from a war to his family, to his mortality and so he has pathos; his melancholy and yearning are attractive to play. Bill becomes a moral barometer for the show."

True Blood was popularly understood as an allegory for the civil rights movement and the struggle for gay rights (although series creator Alan Ball acknowledged but deviated from and sometimes discouraged from interpretation.) "There is no question that True Blood had those parallels," Moyer said in response to this reading. "We even said, 'We’re coming out of the coffin' – it wasn’t a shrouded metaphor."
