= The Walking Dead: Survivors =

2021 video game

- Developer: Galaxy Play Technology Limited
- Publisher: Galaxy Play Technology Limited
- Platforms: iOS, Android
- Release: WW: April 12, 2021
- Genres: Strategy, MMOG

The Walking Dead: Survivors is a freemium mobile strategy video game developed by Elex, licensed by Skybound Entertainment, based on the comic book series The Walking Dead by Robert Kirkman, Tony Moore and Charlie Adlard. The game has more than 80 characters from The Walking Dead comics, including characters such as: Negan, Rick, Michonne, and many more. The game was released for iOS and Android platforms on April 12, 2021.

== Gameplay ==
The Walking Dead: Survivors puts players in charge of a settlement of survivors, surrounded by walkers and rival factions. Players need to strategize the expansion of their settlements by managing resources, armies, and exploration.

Players rebuild a safe place to welcome characters from the comics (Rick, Michonne) and new characters. Each survivor has their own set of skills. Players will decide the best ways to use those particular skills: producing food, clearing up groups of Walkers, leading armies.

Players train and upgrade armies and assign a leader before setting out on different missions across the world map: loot or occupy production farms, explore new locations, clear an area or attack another player base.

Players clear the fog around their settlements to discover a world ravaged by walkers. Exploring is crucial to continue the story, unlock new locations, characters, items, and resources. Upgrading the settlement, survivors, skills, and armies are necessary to explore further as the threats get stronger.

The settlement is under a constant threat from walkers trying to breakthrough. As a result, players need to build up and strengthen their settlement walls. However, upgrading defenses require increasing amounts of resource; players need to maximize their production to protect their settlement faster.

Hordes of walkers will often attack the settlement, and players must place defense towers and assign their best Survivors to ensure the walkers do not breakthrough. During the walker attack, players choose when and where to use their survivor skills, gear, and traps for maximum effect.

Each player can join or create a clan in the game. After players team up, each Clan can build several buildings spread out across the region to gain more territory and wage war against Negan. Once a Clan is joined, the player gains access to many benefits and features:

- Clan members can fight together or reinforce each other during battle, and will always have a better chance of winning battles when fighting alongside clanmates.
- Clan members can help reduce building or healing times, and can be helped as well and gain solo points for helping them
- The player can send/receive resources from and to Clan members.
- Generate additional resources based on Clan size and territory.
- Player can make friends in-game using game-chat or clan function.

=== Game modes ===
The mission is to survive and fight the walkers in multiple different game modes in the game. The game has different types of PvP or PvE game modes. Players develop their settlements and build an army in order to attack enemy bases, destroy them, seize resources and capture enemy territory. Players can attack walkers and Negan's Saviors that periodically appear on the region map in order to claim resources from them. In addition to the usual game modes, players can participate in events, the purpose of which is to capture a location on the map, earning bonuses either for themselves or the Clan that they are a part of. Starting with more minor game modes such as resource gathering, individual development, the player will eventually progress through the story and be eligible to participate in more significant events and game modes.

The game has several additional gameplay modes:

- Duels, a PvP mode. The player selects up to three formations and fights against another player’s preselected survivors. Victories result in survivor equipment and a higher position on the duels ranking.
- Rescue Rick, a PvE mode. The player can challenge a Woodbury army in order to claim various resources and Rick survivors fragments.
- Chronicles, a PvE-mode. The player fights through a series of challenges. Completing the stages can earn the player Resources and Rubies.
- Strongest Survivor, a PvE and PvP Event. The player fights through various challenges during 5–6 days. Every day after completing the stage, players can earn different types of rewards. Players will be ranked according to their total points in each stage and overall score throughout the whole Event.

To participate in special events and game modes, players need to constantly recruit survivors capable of fighting, train troops, upgrade them to increase the power of formations, research, and create equipment to increase combat power further. In addition, many events require coordination and cooperation from multiple players in the same Clan. Through teamwork and coordinated strategies, players can earn great rewards.

== Plot ==
Based on the comic books, The Walking Dead: Survivors has the player controlling the lives of people who have survived the outbreak that created the walkers.

After their town is overrun, the survivors make their way to a new location. However, the settlement is worn down, and the survivors need to repair and upgrade the buildings, walls, and defenses to fend off the constant threat of walker hordes.

The survivors are able to radio, find, and join other people to build their town and an army to defend it. They are raided by Negan and his gang of Saviors, who turn out to be a bigger threat than the walkers.

== Reception ==
Reception

Review scores
Publication	Score
Gamezebo	3.5/5
Hardcore Droid	4/5
Multiplayer.it	6.8/10
Common Sense Media	4/5

The game received positive reviews from critics. Gamezebo: "The Walking Dead: Survivors does a pretty decent job of capturing the barbaric heart of the comics – everything here is life or death, whether you’re cutting down some wood or exploring a fogged up section of the map" in their First Impression Review.
