= Jace Everett =

American singer-songwriter (born 1972)

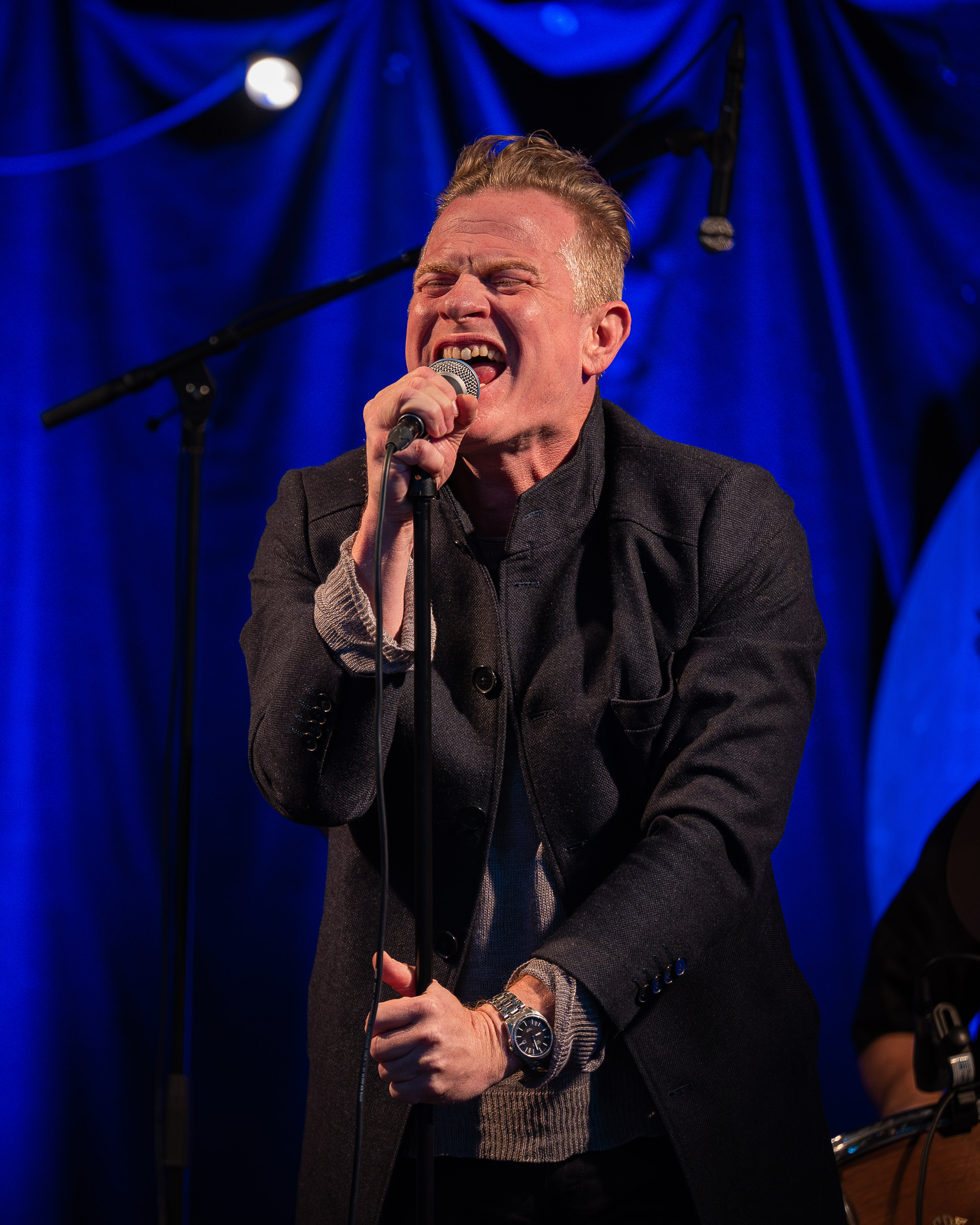
- Everett on stage in 2023

Background information
- Born: Jace Everett Beasley; May 27, 1972 (age 54); Evansville, Indiana, United States
- Origin: Evansville, Indiana
- Genres: Country rock
- Occupations: Singer-songwriter, musician
- Instruments: Vocals, acoustic guitar, electric guitar, bass guitar
- Years active: 2005–present
- Labels: Epic, Phantom, Weston Boys

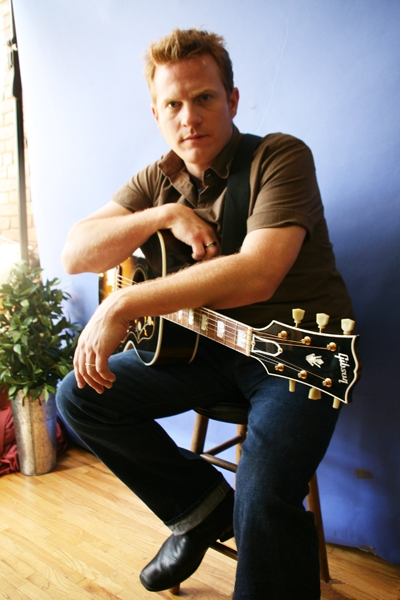
Everett in 2009

Jace Everett Beasley (born May 27, 1972) is an American singer-songwriter and musician. Signed to Epic Records in 2005, he released his debut single "That's the Kind of Love I'm In" in 2005, which peaked at No. 52 on the Billboard Hot Country Songs charts, and was the first single from his self-titled debut album. He also co-wrote Josh Turner's Number One single "Your Man". His song "Bad Things" is the theme for the HBO series True Blood and peaked No. 2 in Norway in 2009. In the same year, he released his third album, Red Revelations, under the Weston Boys label that peaked No. 12 in Norway.

== Biography ==
Jace Everett was born in Evansville, Indiana in 1972. His father's jobs kept them on the move through Indianapolis and then St. Louis, MO before moving to Fort Worth, TX at the age of six. He started playing music in his church and in school concerts. He later moved to Nashville, TN to attend Belmont University.

In 2005, Everett was signed to Epic Records. He released his first single, "That's The Kind of Love I'm In", in June 2005. This song charted at No. 52 on the country charts, and was followed in early 2006 by the release of his self-titled debut album. Also in 2006, Josh Turner charted at Number One on the country charts with the song "Your Man", which Everett co-wrote, and for which Everett received a Broadcast Music Incorporated award. The album's other singles — "Bad Things," "Nowhere in the Neighborhood" and "Everything I Want" — did not chart in the United States, although "Bad Things" reached No. 2 in Norway, No. 30 in Sweden and No. 49 in UK in 2009.

"Bad Things" is used as the theme song for the HBO TV series True Blood. Charlaine Harris pays homage to the song by including "Bad Things" playing at Merlotte's in the 2010 Sookie Stackhouse mystery Dead in the Family. It won a 2009 Broadcast Music Incorporated award in the cable television category and was nominated for a 2009 Scream Award for "Best Scream Song of the Year." His album, entitled Red Revelations, was released in June 2009. His duet Evil (Is Going On), a cover of the song written by Willie Dixon, with C. C. Adcock is part of the True Blood season 2 soundtrack. A new album, "Mr. Good Times" was released in 2011. His latest album, "Terra Rosa" was released digitally on July 23, 2013.

== Discography ==
=== Albums ===
Title	Album details	Peak positions
Title	Album details	NOR
Jace Everett	Release date: March 7, 2006; Label: Epic Records	—
Old New Borrowed Blues	Release date: 2007; Label: Phantom	—
Red Revelations	Release date: June 23, 2009; Label: Weston Boys	12
Mr. Good Times	Release date: September 19, 2011; Label: Humphead Records	—
Terra Rosa	Release date: July 23, 2013; Label: Haywood Group Productions	—
Dust & Dirt	Release date: May 19, 2017; Label: Humphead Records	—
Ylem	Release date: March 3, 2020; Label: Dark Matter/Weston Boys	—
"—" denotes releases that did not chart

=== Singles ===
Year	Single	Peak chart positions				Album
Year	Single	US Country	NOR	SWE	UK	Album
2005	"That's the Kind of Love I'm In"	52	—	—	—	Jace Everett
2005	"Bad Things"	—	—	—	—	Jace Everett
2006	"Nowhere in the Neighborhood"	—	—	—	—	Jace Everett
2006	"Everything I Want"	—	—	—	—	Jace Everett
2009	"Bad Things" (re-release)	—	2	30	49	Red Revelations
2011	"Good Times"	—	—	—	—	Mr. Good Times
"—" denotes releases that did not chart

=== Music videos ===
Year	Video	Director
2005	"That's the Kind of Love I'm In"	David McClister
2005	"Bad Things"	Kristin Barlowe
2017	"Love's Not What We Do"	
2017	"Woke Up in This Town"	
