= Bad Things (Jace Everett song) =

Single by Jace Everett

from the album Jace Everett
- Released: 2005
- Genre: Rockabilly; southern rock; swamp rock; Americana
- Length: 2:44
- Label: Epic Nashville
- Songwriter(s): Jace Everett
- Producer(s): Mark Wright; Greg Droman

Jace Everett singles chronology
"That's the Kind of Love I'm In" (2005)	"Bad Things" (2005)	"Nowhere in the Neighborhood" (2006)

"Bad Things" is a song written and recorded by American singer Jace Everett. It is included on his only album for Epic Records Nashville, the self-titled Jace Everett. Although released as a single in 2005, it did not chart on the Hot Country Songs charts that year. The song charted in the United Kingdom, Norway, Sweden, and Finland in 2009 after it was selected as the theme song for the HBO series True Blood.

== Critical reception ==
Stephen Thomas Erlewine, in his review of the album for Allmusic, compared the song in theme to Chris Isaak's "Baby Did a Bad, Bad Thing", saying that it was "less menacing and a little rowdier" than that song.

== Use in media ==
In 2008, it was selected as the theme song for HBO's vampire series True Blood. It won a 2009 Broadcast Music Incorporated award in the cable television category and was nominated for a 2009 Scream Award for "Best Scream Song of the Year".

== Chart performance ==
Chart performance for "Bad Things"
Chart (2009–2010)	Peak position
Norway (VG-lista)	2
Scotland (OCC)	39
Sweden (Sverigetopplistan)	30
UK Singles (OCC)	49
UK Indie (OCC)	33

== Certifications ==
Certifications for "Bad Things"
Region	Certification	Certified units/sales
United Kingdom (BPI)	Silver	200,000^{‡}
^{‡} Sales+streaming figures based on certification alone.
