= Everyone's Waiting =

- Six Feet Under episode
- The extended Fisher family toasts Nate's memory at Claire's farewell dinner.
- Episode no.: Season 5 Episode 12
- Directed by: Alan Ball
- Written by: Alan Ball
- Original air date: August 21, 2005
- Running time: 72 minutes

Guest appearances
- Kathy Bates as Bettina; Jeremy Sisto as Billy Chenowith; Joanna Cassidy as Margaret Chenowith; Richard Jenkins as Nathaniel Fisher; Tina Holmes as Maggie; Peter Macdissi as Olivier Castro-Staal; Chris Messina as Ted Fairwell; Kendré Berry as Durrell; C. J. Sanders as Anthony; Tim Maculan as Father Jack; Becky Thyre as Marcie; James McDonnell as Dr. Frank

Episode chronology
← Previous "Static"	Next → —

"Everyone's Waiting" is the series finale of the American drama television series Six Feet Under. It is the twelfth episode of the fifth season and the 63rd episode overall. It was written and directed by series creator Alan Ball, and originally aired in the United States on HBO on August 21, 2005. The episode was met with universal acclaim from both critics and viewers alike, and is often cited as one of the finest series finales in the history of television.

== Plot ==
The episode begins like no other in the series: not with a death, but with a birth. Willa Fisher Chenowith is born prematurely, and Brenda is plagued by visions of Nate, who vicariously conveys Brenda's internal fears that the child will not survive and insists that he cannot accept it if she does make it and that she is "damaged". Ruth stays by Brenda's side during Willa's recovery and stops fighting to keep Maya with her. Brenda later has a vision of Nate and Nathaniel holding Willa, with Nate showing his love for both Brenda and their daughter, suggesting that Brenda is finally positive for Willa's health and welfare.

Ruth sinks even deeper into her depression when Brenda takes Maya back. George tries to comfort her and promises he will help her get through it. Ruth is helped by a phone call to Maggie when she tells Ruth that Nate was happy the night he suffered his ultimately fatal stroke.

Claire gets back into photography with Ted's help, and later receives a phone call from a stock photography company in New York saying they have a position for her as a photographer's assistant. She later finds out that Olivier recommended her for the position. After finding her mother crying, she says she will stay at home to help her, but Ruth insists that she move to New York, so she will not regret it later. Ruth also unfreezes the trust fund set up by her father. Claire later finds out that the photo company consolidated its operations and her position is no longer available. As she considers calling off her trip, Nate tells her she needs to go to start a new life in New York anyway, as he did years earlier when he moved to Seattle with no guarantee of employment.

As per Keith's suggestion, David agrees to temporarily leave home, so he can recover from the loss of his brother, and returns to the funeral home. During a nightmare, he is confronted by Nathaniel about considering leaving the business and his sexuality. He is then confronted by the attacker in a red hooded sweater that has plagued his recent thoughts. This time, David fights back and finally sees his own face, allowing him to let go of his past.

Rico, disillusioned by the direction Fisher and Diaz have been taking, encourages David to sell the funeral home as he has had the business valued and realizes that his 25% share is worth $500,000, which he and Vanessa want to use to buy their own funeral home. David initially agrees, but changes his mind after having a vision of his father Nathaniel telling him that the business is his birthright. Instead, David and Keith buy out Rico's 25% share using Keith's life savings, freeing the Diaz family to pursue their own venture. Brenda also agrees to give David and Keith as much time as they need to buy her share, which she inherited from Nate. Keith and David move into the funeral home with their sons Durell and Anthony and redecorate it. Ruth initially plans to move in with George but changes her mind and instead moves in with her friend Betina, while continuing her relationship with George in separate residences.

Nate visits Claire one last time as she prepares to leave for New York.

The extended Fisher family (except the Diaz family who have their own family dinner to celebrate the buyout) has a farewell dinner for Claire where they reminisce about Nate, telling stories and toasting Nate's memory. The next morning, Claire has a tearful goodbye with her family and drives off into her future.

The episode ends with flash-forwards to milestone events in the main characters' lives and, ultimately, their deaths. The montage, set to Sia's "Breathe Me", is intercut with views of Claire driving out of Los Angeles.

In the flash-forwards, Ruth is seen enjoying life in Topanga, David teaches Durrell about embalming, the extended Fisher family celebrates Willa's birthday, and David and Keith get married. Ruth dies in 2025 of old age in the hospital, with David, Claire, and George at her side. She sees her deceased husband Nathaniel and son Nate before she dies. Ted shows up unannounced at Ruth's funeral, and he and Claire later get married. Keith is shot and killed in 2029 by robbers while exiting an armored truck owned by his self-named security firm. At a family function in 2044, David dies of a heart attack after seeing a vision of a young Keith smiling at him. While on a cruise with his wife in 2049, Rico has a heart attack and collapses. Brenda dies of old age in 2051 at her home while her brother Billy talks to her about Claire and Ted. Finally, in 2085, having outlived them all, Claire dies peacefully at the age of 101 in her own home, with photographs of the Fisher family adorning her walls.

== Production ==
According to Alan Ball, a writer whom he does not remember came up with the idea of killing every character in the finale, which was initially viewed as a joke, but the writers then took it seriously and thought it would be the perfect ending to the show.

"Breathe Me" by Sia was used as the song that plays during the flash-forward montage. The show's music supervisor Gary Calamar picked the song for the season's promo, and he and Ball decided to use it again for the montage.

== Reception ==
=== Critical response ===
"Everyone's Waiting" has received widespread acclaim since its release. TV Guide ranked the episode #22 on its list of "TV's Top 100 Episodes of All Time" and also named it one of the best TV moments of the decade. Entertainment Weekly put it on its end-of-the-decade, "best-of" list, saying, "Wrapping up an acclaimed show is pretty much a no-win proposition (e.g., The Sopranos). But Alan Ball's 2005 coda distilled all that we'd learned about life and death after five seasons with the Fishers."

In 2011, the finale was ranked #8 on the TV Guide Network special, TV's Most Unforgettable Finales.

In 2024, Rolling Stone ranked the episode #53 on its "The 100 Best TV Episodes of All Time" list, saying "for a series so devoted to sudden death, it goes out with a tribute to a long life well-lived." In 2025, The Independent ranked the episode #46 on its "The Greatest TV Episodes of All Time" list, saying "it’s hard to pinpoint a specific episode of Six Feet Under that stands out from the rest as there’s not really a dud in the pack. But the series finale capped things off in a spectacular manner."

=== Awards and nominations ===
In 2006, the episode received five Primetime Emmy Award nominations at the 58th Primetime Emmy Awards. Creator Alan Ball was nominated for Outstanding Writing for a Drama Series and Outstanding Directing for a Drama series; it was also nominated for Outstanding Art Direction for a Single-Camera Series and Outstanding Hairstyling for a Series. It would win for Outstanding Prosthetic Makeup for a Series, Miniseries, Movie, or Special.

=== In popular culture ===
The finale's closing montage was directly parodied in the season 29 finale for The Simpsons.
