= Alicia Erian =

American novelist

- Born: 1967 (age 58–59); Syracuse, New York, U.S.
- Occupation: Author
- Writing career
- Period: 2001–present

Alicia Erian (born 1967) is an American novelist.

She was born to an Egyptian father and American mother of Polish descent. She received a Bachelor of Arts in English from Binghamton University and a Master of Fine Arts in writing from Vermont College. A writer of short stories, some of her work has appeared in Zoetrope: All Story and the Iowa Review. She has published one collection of short stories and one novel. Erian lived in Brooklyn, New York, for a time with ex-husband David Franklin, but now lives in Massachusetts, where she taught creative writing at Wellesley College (2004–2008). She has worked as a film director and screenwriter, and has also attracted interest from Julia Roberts' production company, American Girl Films, as well as Francis Ford Coppola.

== Works ==
Erian's first published work was a collection of short stories titled The Brutal Language of Love, published in 2001. Each story features a female protagonist. The Brutal Language of Love tells heartbreaking tales of love and sex, and dilemmas caused by the intertwining of the two.

Alicia Erian's 2005 novel, Towelhead is a coming of age story about a thirteen-year-old girl named Jasira, who is sent from her Euro-American mother's home in Syracuse, New York to live with her Lebanese father in Houston, Texas. Towelhead has been adapted into a film written and directed by Alan Ball, starring Summer Bishil, Aaron Eckhart, Toni Collette, Maria Bello, and Peter Macdissi.

In 2008, Alicia Erian wrote the screenplay for the short film Hammer and Anvil, which was developed at the Sundance Institute's 2008 January Screenwriters Lab. Hammer and Anvil is directed by Michael Greif.
