= 2020 Deauville American Film Festival =

- Location: Deauville, France
- Hosted by: Deauville American Film Festival Group
- Festival date: September 4, 2020–September 13, 2020
- Language: International
- Website: www.festival-deauville.com

The 2020 Deauville American Film Festival was the 46th edition of the Deauville American Film Festival, held at Deauville, France from September 4 to 13, 2020. The festival was held in spite of the COVID-19 pandemic.

French singer and actress Vanessa Paradis was appointed as the president of the jury. The festival paid tribute to Kirk Douglas. The Grand Special Prize was awarded to The Nest directed by Sean Durkin. The Nest film was also awarded with the International Critics' prize and the Revelation Prize.

== Juries ==
=== Main Competition ===
- Vanessa Paradis: singer and actress (President of Jury)
- Yann Gonzalez : director
- Zita Hanrot : actress
- Delphine Horvilleur : journalist
- Vincent Lacoste : actor
- Mounia Meddour : actress
- Bruno Podalydès : actor, director
- Oxmo Puccino : hip hop musician

=== Revelation jury ===
- Rebecca Zlotowski: French film director and screenwriter (President of Jury)
- Luàna Bajrami : actress, director
- Mya Bollaers : actress
- Arnaud Rebotini : composer, musician
- Antoine Reinartz : actor

== Programme ==
=== Competition ===
- The Assistant by Kitty Green
- First Cow by Kelly Reichardt
- Giants Being Lonely by Grear Patterson
- Holler by Nicole Riegel
- Kajillionaire by Miranda July
- Last Words by Jonathan Nossiter
- Lorelei by Sabrina Doyle
- Love is Love is Love by Eleanor Coppola
- Minari by Lee Isaac Chung
- Shiva Baby by Emma Seligman
- Sophie Jones by Jessie Barr
- Sound of Metal by Darius Marder
- Uncle Frank by Alan Ball
- The Violent Heart by Kerem Sanga
- The Nest by Sean Durkin

=== Les Premières (Premieres) ===
- How I Became a Super Hero by Douglas Attal
- Critical Thinking by John Leguizamo
- Wendy by Benh Zeitlin
- Bad Education by Cory Finley
- Don't Tell a Soul by Alex McAulay
- Resistance by Jonathan Jakubowicz
- Sons of Philadelphia by Jérémie Guez
- The Professor and the Madman by Farhad Safinia
- Wander by April Mullen

=== Les Docs De L'Oncle Sam (Uncle Sam's Doc) ===
- Billie by James Erskine
- Kubrick by Kubrick by Gregory Monro
- Leap of Faith : William Friedkin on The exorcist by Alexandre O. Philippe
- Deauville et le rêve américain by Daphné Baiwir
- Kirk Douglas, l'indompté by Hubert Attal
- Pierre & Lescure de Maxime Switek and Philippe Lézin
- The Last Hillbilly by Diane-Sara Bouzgarrou and Thomas Jenkoe
- Weed & Wine by Rebecca Richman Cohen

=== Tribute to Kirk Douglas ===
- The Final Countdown by Don Taylor
- Seven Days in May by John Frankenheimer
- Lonely Are the Brave by David Miller
- Spartacus by Stanley Kubrick
- The Vikings by Richard Fleischer
- Paths of Glory by Stanley Kubrick
- Lust for Life by Vincente Minnelli and Georges Cukor
- The Bad and the Beautiful by Vincente Minnelli
- The Big Sky by Howard Hawks
- Ace in the Hole by Billy Wilder
- Champion by Mark Robson
- Out of the Past by Jacques Tourneur

== Awards ==
- Grand Prix (Grand Special Prize): The Nest by Sean Durkin
- Prix du Jury (Jury Special Prize): (tied) First Cow by Kelly Reichardt and Lorelei by Sabrina Doyle
- Prix du Public (Audience Award): Uncle Frank by Alan Ball
- Prix de la Critique Internationale (International Critics' prize): The Nest by Sean Durkin
- Prix Michel d'Ornano (Michel d'Ornano Award for debut French film): Slalom by Charlène Favier
- Prix de la Révélation (Revelation Prize): The Nest by Sean Durkin
