= Towelhead =

Towelhead may refer to:

- Towelhead, an ethnic slur for people of Arab descent especially those wearing Keffiyeh
- Towelhead (novel), a 2005 novel by Alicia Erian
- Towelhead (film), a 2007 film by Alan Ball based on the aforementioned novel
