= List of Six Feet Under characters =

The following is a list of descriptions for characters on the HBO television series Six Feet Under, which aired for five seasons, from 2001 through 2005.

While the series ends in 2005, the finale ("Everyone's Waiting") was met with universal acclaim from both critics and viewers alike, who cited the fact that the finale looked decades forward to the end of each main character's life, as shown in the "biographies" below.

== Cast table ==
| Character | Portrayed by | Season | | | | |
| Character | Portrayed by | 1 | 2 | 3 | 4 | 5 |
Main characters
| Nate Fisher | Peter Krause | Main | Main | Main | Main | Main |
| David Fisher | Michael C. Hall | Main | Main | Main | Main | Main |
| Ruth Fisher | Frances Conroy | Main | Main | Main | Main | Main |
| Claire Fisher | Lauren Ambrose | Main | Main | Main | Main | Main |
| Federico Diaz | Freddy Rodriguez | Main | Main | Main | Main | Main |
| Keith Charles | Mathew St. Patrick | Main | Main | Main | Main | Main |
| Brenda Chenowith | Rachel Griffiths | Main | Main | Main | Main | Main |
| Billy Chenowith | Jeremy Sisto | Main | Recurring | Recurring | Recurring | Recurring |
| George Sibley | James Cromwell | | | Recurring | Main | Main |
| Vanessa Diaz | Justina Machado | Recurring | Recurring | Recurring | Recurring | Main |

== Major characters ==
=== Nate Fisher ===
Nathaniel Samuel "Nate" Fisher, Jr. (1965–2005), played by Peter Krause, is the oldest of the three Fisher siblings. In the first episode, Nate is returning to Los Angeles on Christmas Eve only to learn that his father has died.

A recurring theme throughout the series is Nate searching for the ideal life. In the pilot episode, he meets Brenda Chenowith on an airplane and has sex with her upon landing. Brenda becomes his on-again/off-again lover throughout the series. Upon learning of his father's death, his mother asks him to stay, despite Nate wanting to return to Seattle. Displeased with the direction his life is going, Nate agrees to stay and become business partners with his brother in the funeral home. Nate is diagnosed with an arteriovenous malformation (AVM), and then engaged to Brenda. During their engagement, Brenda sleeps with others, claiming a sex addiction which Nate does not believe. Nate starts to have seizures and seeks treatment for his AVM. Nate marries his former roommate and girlfriend Lisa, after discovering that Lisa is pregnant with their child (between seasons 2 and 3). When their daughter Maya is still very young, Lisa disappears and is eventually discovered to have drowned. It's later implied that she was murdered by her brother-in-law when she tried to end their affair. Nate conspired to fulfill Lisa's wishes for a "green" burial, despite her family’s wish for her to be cremated and interred in the family mausoleum. Nate reconciles with Brenda and they move in together. He agrees to marry her and have a child but Brenda miscarries on the eve of their wedding. Nate does not want Brenda's next pregnancy. He develops feelings for his stepfather's daughter, Maggie, a Quaker. After Nate and Maggie have sex, he collapses and is rushed to a hospital. Although it appears he will recover, he dies in his sleep with David by his side.

Following his death, the series spends the last three episodes addressing the other characters' lives as they attempt to cope with his absence. Nate – like his father – continues to appear in these episodes as a mental manifestation of his surviving family.

=== David Fisher ===
David James Fisher (1969–2044), played by Michael C. Hall, is the middle child in the Fisher family. Prior to the start of the series, David was engaged to a woman named Jennifer Mason, but broke the engagement because he was unsure of his sexuality. David is gay but no one knows except his boyfriend, Keith Charles, a police officer, whom he met at a church social function. Keith has come out to his family and friends and quickly loses patience with David hiding his own sexuality. David joined the family business in 1989 at the age of 20 and was upset that his brother Nate did not do the same. After his father's death and Nate's return, David holds resentment towards Nate, which is resolved when Nate agrees to help with the family funeral business. At the same time, David is offered his father's old position as deacon at their local church, which frowns upon homosexuality. After breaking up with Keith over continuing sexuality issues, David briefly engages in some anonymous sex, for which he suffered ongoing legal issues. After arranging a funeral for a young gay man who was brutally murdered for his sexual orientation, David comes out to his family and resigns his post as deacon. David and Keith eventually reconcile and start planning a family together. Soon after, David is carjacked. The experience leaves him extremely traumatized and he remains so for the rest of the series. They later adopt two young boys (brothers) Anthony and Durrell.

David marries Keith around 2009 and they remain together until Keith's death in 2029. David dies in 2044, aged 75, at a family outing after seeing a vision of a young Keith.

=== Ruth Fisher ===
Ruth O'Connor Fisher (November 17, 1946 – March 12, 2025), played by Frances Conroy, is the widow of Nathaniel, Sr and mother to Nate, David and Claire. Ruth had an unhappy and abusive childhood, so she has learned to bottle her emotions, frequently resulting in a violent outburst.

Ruth married Nathaniel Fisher in 1965 after becoming pregnant with her first child, Nate, who was born while Nathaniel is serving in Vietnam. Four years later, David was born. Their last child, Claire, is born much later, in 1983. Feeling trapped in a maternal role at such a young age, Ruth resented her younger sister Sarah, an artist whom Ruth views as a free spirit.

Before the series begins, Ruth had an affair with her hairdresser, Hiram Gunderson. After Nathaniel's sudden death, she calls off the affair to mourn but rekindles the relationship some months later. Ruth takes a job at a flower shop, where the owner Nikolai becomes infatuated with her. Hiram then breaks up with Ruth and she begins seeing Nikolai. Ruth ends their relationship when she realizes Nikolai has been feeling suffocated by her attentions and has only been staying with her out of guilt.

During her daughter-in-law Lisa's disappearance, Ruth struggles with her emotions and her role of matriarch. During this time, she meets and marries geologist George Sibley after six weeks of courtship. During the marriage, Ruth discovers unpleasant facts about her new husband's past, including multiple wives and an estranged son. During this time, George becomes increasingly paranoid, particularly with beliefs regarding an inevitable nuclear apocalypse, forcing Ruth to admit him for treatments including electro-convulsive therapy. During that time, Ruth finds it hard to deal with his subsequent memory loss and emotional instability, Ruth decides to set George up with a life separate from hers before eventually divorcing him.

After Nate's death, Ruth decides she needs a change in her life and moves in with her sister Sarah and her caretaker, Bettina. Ruth dies at the age of 78 at a hospital with George and her surviving children at her bedside. In her final moments, she sees the spirits of Nathaniel and Nate.

=== Claire Fisher ===
Claire Simone Fisher (March 13, 1983 – February 11, 2085), played by Lauren Ambrose, is the only daughter and third child of the Fisher family. Claire is known for being rebellious throughout her teenage years and often acts in a selfish and surly manner, yet displays genuine affection and care for her family at moments of crisis. Claire is the most creative member of the family, specializing in art and photography. Claire has several turbulent relationships during the five years of the series. Claire's high school boyfriend, Gabe, was a troubled and rebellious teen. Claire briefly questions her sexuality, experimenting with a fellow female college student, but this ends badly when Claire cannot commit. Claire also had brief relationship with Brenda's brother Billy, who has bipolar disorder. Claire dated a fellow college student Russell, who struggled with his sexuality and had an affair with their professor, Olivier.

During Season 5, Claire works as a temp in a legal department where she meets and begins to date Ted, a Republican lawyer, despite having left-wing views. Ted becomes a source of comfort after Nate's death. In the series finale, Claire receives a job offer to work as a photographer's assistant in New York, but the job offer is later rescinded when the company is taken over by a corporation. Claire's mental manifestation of Nate encourages her to move to New York anyway, assuring her she will find something. Claire decides to do so, leaving her family and Ted behind, driving to NYC in her new Toyota Prius, replacing the family's vintage Cadillac hearse, which Claire wrecked. On her journey, she listens to a CD which Ted gave her, a compilation of 'un-hip' songs he listens to. In 2025, then in her 40s, Claire returns to L.A. shortly before her mother's death. Claire reunites with Ted at her mother's funeral and later marries him. According to her obituary, Claire became an award-winning photographer and taught photography as a faculty member at New York University's Tisch School of the Arts in 2018, earning tenure in 2028. Claire eventually dies of natural causes in 2085 at the age of 101, as she lies in her bed surrounded by pictures of her family – eight decades after the finale and the last to die from those introduced in the opening episode.

=== Brenda Chenowith ===
Brenda Chenowith (1969–2051), played by Rachel Griffiths, is Nate's girlfriend and, later, wife. Her parents are wealthy psychiatrists who were in an open marriage, flaunting their activities in front of their children. As a child, she was under the scrutiny of Dr. Gareth Feinberg and various psychologists who began documenting her odd behavior. Being a genius, however, she would study the symptoms of various mental disorders and feign them to spite the doctors. Her case was turned into a best-selling book titled Charlotte Light and Dark, which haunts Brenda into adulthood.

Her brother (Billy) is a successful photographer, struggling with bipolar disorder. Brenda spent much of her life taking care of Billy and has struggled to build her own life outside of Billy's illness. Billy has a strong fixation on Brenda's life and their relationship at times bordered on incest.

At the time of the series beginning, Brenda runs a shiatsu massage service out of her house. Brenda meets Nate Fisher on a flight from Seattle to Los Angeles, immediately before Nate learns of his father's death. The two begin a relationship which is often interrupted by her brother Billy who continues to find his way into her life. After she has her brother institutionalized for violent behavior, Brenda returns to college to study psychology and begins writing a novel to stave off depression. She develops a friendship with a high-class prostitute and eventually finds herself succumbing to sexual impulses outside of her relationship. Nate breaks up with Brenda after her sexual addiction is revealed. Consequently, she spirals into drug addiction and harmful behavior. Brenda moves away from Los Angeles and seeks therapy.

Brenda returns to L.A. after her father is diagnosed with terminal cancer. She then begins a relationship with her neighbor Joe, who likes to be dominated in bed. After Joe catches Brenda making out with Nate, he ends the relationship and moves out of the house they had recently bought.

Brenda reconciles with Nate and becomes pregnant. On the night before their wedding, Brenda suffers a miscarriage. Brenda eventually becomes pregnant again and begins an internship as a cognitive therapist. About this time, Nate begins spending a lot of time with his step-sister Maggie and becomes interested in her religion. After Nate's collapse and admission to hospital, he breaks up with Brenda but dies before divorce proceedings begin. Six weeks after Nate's death, Brenda successfully delivers a premature baby girl named Willa.

Brenda becomes a university professor and leading scholar on the topic of development of gifted children. Brenda later marries a man named Daniel Nathanson and has another child, Forrest Nathanson. She dies of natural causes in 2051, aged 82, while sitting talking with her brother Billy.

=== Keith Charles ===
Keith Dwayne Charles (1968–2029), played by Mathew St. Patrick, is David's main love interest over the course of the series. Keith was born in 1968 in San Diego and attended West Point Military Academy, before graduating with a degree in Criminology in 1989. David and Keith began dating some months before the pilot episode after meeting at a gay-friendly church.

Keith is an openly gay policeman who works for the Los Angeles Police Department (LAPD). He tolerates David hiding his sexuality until an incident where a fellow shopper calls them "fags". Keith dumps David and begins dating an emergency medical technician named Eddie, but their relationship fails when Keith becomes concerned with his niece Taylor and his sister Karla Denise, who goes into drug rehabilitation. David and Keith then reconcile. After Keith's sister is incarcerated, Keith gets custody of Taylor and begins adoption proceedings. However, after Keith brutally beats a man during a domestic violence call, he resigns from the LAPD and gives Taylor to his parents without consulting David. David is hurt and furious, and the two go into couples' counseling to sort out their issues.

After another breakup with David, Keith finds work as a bodyguard, but does not reveal his sexuality to co-workers. He is selected to go on tour with pop star Celeste (Michelle Trachtenberg). While Keith is on tour, David is carjacked and tortured, so Keith returns home for several days, but returns to the tour at David's insistence. While he is gone, David begins to suffer from panic attacks and becomes emotionally unstable. Keith, who has "come out" at work, confides in Celeste about David, and she seduces him into having sex, then fires him the next day for the indiscretion. When Keith gets home, he confesses the one-night stand to David, and David suffers anxiety that Keith will leave him for a woman. Keith is hired as personal security to an agent named Roger in order to have a lawsuit against David (who had previously attacked Roger and was being sued) dropped.

Towards the end of Season 4, Keith and David decide to have children, with Keith favoring surrogacy and David favoring adoption. During Season 5, after the surrogacy attempt fails, they adopt brothers Anthony and Durrell, whom David met at a fair. Durrell is rebellious due to his history of foster care, but despite Keith's protests, David insists that they keep the boys. Soon, Keith begins to embrace his new family life. Keith offers to combine his savings with David's when Rico has a chance to buy his own smaller mortuary and agrees to sell back his 25% share of Fisher & Diaz Funeral Home for $500,000.

The series finale and official HBO website reveal that Keith eventually owns his own security company, and dies in 2029 at age 61 after being gunned down in an armored car. While at a family function in 2044, David sees Keith in a vision, still young and healthy and playing football; Keith smiles at David, who immediately dies from a heart attack.

=== Federico Diaz ===
Hector Federico "Rico" Diaz (1974–2049), played by Freddy Rodriguez, is the extremely skilled restorative artist who later becomes a partner in the business. In 1992, Rico's father Mauricio slipped on the roof and landed face-first in a pile of bricks next to the house. Rico and his mother Lilia went to the Fisher funeral home for burial, and to Rico's shock, Nathaniel Fisher Sr. (who then owned and operated the home) had made his father look just as he was before the accident. Rico struck up a friendship with Nathaniel, who paid for his education and hired him as a restorative artist. They remained close until Nathaniel's death. Rico married his high school sweetheart, Vanessa and had two children. Federico graduated from Cypress College in 1997 with a degree in Mortuary Science. Rico is considered one of the best in the business, and is briefly lured away by a funeral home chain called Kroehner Services International, before he realizes he has become just another over-worked employee. He returns to work with David and Nate, though often resenting his status within the business. Although Rico and Vanessa struggle for money, they receive inheritance from an elderly neighbor and Rico buys 25% of Fisher & Sons, becoming Fisher & Diaz Funeral Home. Rico becomes involved with a stripper and is thrown out by his wife. He is devastated by the breakdown of his marriage, however he and Vanessa eventually reconcile. Federico is frequently in conflict with the Fishers over the direction of the business. After the death of Nate, Federico is pondering his future with Fisher & Diaz when he hears about a mortuary in the area for sale. David and Keith purchase Rico's 25% and Federico and Vanessa go on to establish the Diaz Family Mortuary in 2005, where he serves the community for 35 years before retiring. Rico dies in 2049 at age 75 on a cruise ship apparently of a heart attack while at his wife's side. He leaves behind his wife Vanessa, his sons Julio and Augusto and his three grandchildren: Emily, Celestina and Vincent.

=== Billy Chenowith ===
Billy Chenowith, played by Jeremy Sisto, is an artist and Brenda's younger brother. He has bipolar disorder and occasionally has disruptive, and sometimes violent, episodes of mania, depression, and psychosis. While his disorder can be managed with medication, he sometimes stops using it for various reasons, which has caused many issues for his family, especially Brenda. In 1986, he burnt down a section of the family home, which caused Brenda to leave school and abandon her fiancé. In another incident, he carved a tattoo off his back with a box cutter and attempts to do the same to his sister, forcing his sister to have him committed. Billy is an alumnus and associate professor at LAC-Arts, where Claire Fisher also attends college until late 2004. Billy first meets Claire in 2001 at Brenda's place but nothing happens besides casual flirting. After being institutionalized, the only person he can talk to is Claire and they begin to communicate over instant messaging. After he is released he rekindles the relationship, and the two begin dating two years later, briefly living together. After some taunting by old acquaintances that he's not the guy he used to be, coupled with finding himself lacking artistic inspiration, Billy again ceases to take his medication. When Claire realizes this, she breaks it off with him for her own safety. Billy goes back on his medication and asks Claire to take him back, but she refuses. Billy later helps his sister after Nate dies, until she asks him to leave. However, the two remain close and Billy is present when Brenda dies. During Brenda's death, Billy is shown talking about Claire's husband, Ted.

=== George Sibley ===
George Sibley, played by James Cromwell, is Ruth's second husband, a professor of geology who had been married six times previously. He has two children from a previous marriage: a son, Brian, and a daughter, Maggie, who is a traveling pharmaceutical representative. While he was still a student, George dated a woman and she became pregnant with a son, Kyle. Before Kyle was born, however, George signed away his custodial rights, and Kyle, though he was born into great wealth, intensely hated his father and sent boxes of feces to the Fisher home. George and Kyle later reconcile with Ruth's help. George has psychotic depression and undergoes electroconvulsive therapy, still recovering from the wounds of his mother's suicide when he was a child in 1953. It soon becomes too much for Ruth to take care of him, and the two separate. After adjusting, he reveals to Ruth that he is engaged for the eighth time. Ruth warns this new fiancée of George's past and sabotages the relationship. George and Ruth later reconcile at the time of Nate's death. They plan to move in together but Ruth changes her mind at the last minute, preferring her independence. Meanwhile, his daughter Maggie walks out of his life after blaming him for her problems. Ruth and George remain in separate residences, but stay together until her death in 2025.

=== Vanessa Diaz ===
Vanessa Diaz, played by Justina Machado, is Federico's high school sweetheart, wife and mother of his two sons Julio and Augusto. Vanessa is a registered nurse. In 2002, after several years of working at the Bay Breeze Nursing Home she is fired for negligence after not realizing that a resident's roommate shoved a hot dog down the deceased's throat. She later finds work at a hospital. In 2003 Vanessa sinks into clinical depression following the death of her mother and begins abusing prescription medication. When her health begins to suffer she seeks help; her increased spending habits and closeness to her sister Angelica alienate Rico. In late season four, Federico's infidelity causes the couple to separate and consider divorce. After finding it difficult to live and raise her sons alone, she asks Federico to move back in. However, she is initially very cold towards him, refusing to communicate with him more than the bare minimum and taking every opportunity to let him know he is not forgiven for his actions. When Rico finally tells her that he does not want to be there if she no longer loves him and will move out for good, Vanessa begins treating him a little better, and they slowly begin to successfully work through their issues until their marriage is back on solid footing. Throughout the series, Rico's moods and decisions outside the home are often closely affected by Vanessa's advice and attitude. Vanessa pushes Rico into opening his own mortuary business, and they remain together for many years until his death at age 75.

== Supporting characters ==
=== Father Jack ===
Father Jack, played by Tim Maculan, is a compassionate Episcopal priest who heads the Episcopal church which the Fishers attend. It is hinted that he is gay.

=== Nathaniel Fisher ===
Nathaniel Samuel Fisher, Sr. (June 9, 1943 – December 24, 2000), played by Richard Jenkins, is the patriarch of the Fisher family and owner of Fisher & Sons Funeral Home until his death in a traffic accident on Christmas Eve, 2000. Although Ruth viewed him as a distant husband and father, many flashbacks show him trying his best to bond with his children, but also to give them their space, as well as acting as a surrogate father and friend to Rico. Even after his death, he is still a presence with all of the Fishers and Rico and frequently appears in scenes as the living characters converse with him, visually like a "ghost" but actually as a fiction of their minds and sort of a conscience. In many of the early episodes, family members have lengthy conversations with the senior Nathaniel, on their way to reconciling themselves with his death. His children, particularly Nate, all come to realize that they never really knew their father; something they all grieve. Both Nathaniel Sr. and Jr. appear to Ruth shortly before her death.

=== Lisa Kimmel Fisher ===
Lisa Kimmel Fisher (1967–2003), played by Lili Taylor, is Nate's friend from Seattle who becomes pregnant after he visits and they sleep together. This is apparently her second pregnancy from Nate; it is implied she had an abortion after their first pregnancy. They later marry after the birth of their daughter, Maya. Their marriage lasts throughout season 3, but is a turbulent one, as Lisa worries about Nate's remaining feelings for Brenda. Several episodes during season 3 and 4 focus on Lisa's disappearance. It becomes evident that she is dead and her corpse is later found washed up on the beach. Nate conflicts with Lisa's family about how she wanted to be buried; Lisa had told him that she wanted to be buried in the wilderness with no chemicals or preservatives, while her family wants her cremated and buried in their family mausoleum in Coeur d'Alene, Idaho. Nate buries Lisa as she wanted, while giving her family the cremated remains of an unclaimed body from several decades earlier. At the end of season 4, it is revealed that her brother-in-law, Hoyt, with whom she had had an affair before marrying Nate, was with her on the beach the day she drowned. The details of Lisa's death are left ambiguous (although murder by Hoyt is strongly implied, it is never confirmed) but she remains in the show as another deceased character who appears in recurring visions, frequently to Nate or Brenda.

=== Margaret Chenowith ===
Margaret Chenowith, played by Joanna Cassidy, is Brenda and Billy's dysfunctional mother and a psychologist. Her bouts of misplaced anger can be seen throughout the series. In the 1960s, she met her future husband, Bernard Chenowith in therapy when she was working as an intern. The couple married in 1967. In the 1970s, the Chenowiths had become controversial for allowing their daughter Brenda to undergo testing by the controversial Gareth Feinberg, who later wrote Charlotte: Light and Dark about Brenda. Though Margaret and Bernard have an open marriage, they separate briefly in 2002 after Bernard lies about an infidelity. The two later renew their vows and soon after, Bernard dies of cancer in early 2003. Margaret moves on and begins dating her son's former lover (and art teacher), Olivier Castro-Staal.

=== Maggie Sibley ===
Maggie Sibley, played by Tina Holmes, is George's daughter. A Quaker and traveling pharmaceutical representative from Arizona, Maggie moves to Los Angeles to help take care of her ailing father. She and Nate become close friends, with Nate confiding to her his fears about his and Brenda's unborn child after blood tests show the baby may have special needs (Maggie's own child had died of leukemia when he was only two). Rather than confide in his pregnant wife, Nate decides to cheat on her, sleeping with Maggie on the evening of his seizure. Maggie suffers guilt and tried to make amends with Brenda, who is not interested. Maggie leaves town after Nate's funeral and an argument with her father. Ruth later calls Maggie to ask her if Nate had been happy while he was with her before he had his stroke. During the phone call, Maggie is at the doctor's office, which led to audience speculation as to whether she was pregnant with Nate's child. Alan Ball specifically denied this speculation during his DVD commentary on the series finale, noting that as a pharmaceutical industry representative, Maggie is simply working when we see her in the doctor's office.

=== Sarah O'Connor ===
Sarah O'Connor, played by Patricia Clarkson, is Ruth's artistic younger sister who runs an artists' colony in Topanga Canyon. Sarah lives with a caretaker and friend named Bettina. Sarah feels she has little talent but surrounds herself with people who do. As a young girl Sarah left Ruth alone to deal with sick relatives. Sarah later baby-sat Ruth's sons and they got into trouble: fifteen-year-old Nate Jr lost his virginity to a friend of Sarah's and David once got lost in the wild. Ruth resented Sarah for both these reasons and they stayed out of touch for decades. The two finally reconcile after Ruth attends a self-help seminar and Sarah returns from Spain. Sarah feels a strong connection to Claire, who she believes is a true artist. She invites Claire to her house in Topanga and they spend a weekend together. She sends Claire magic mushrooms on her birthday to help inspire her artistic passion. Ruth discovers that Sarah has developed a drug addiction to the pain killer Vicodin. Weeks after going through withdrawal, Sarah goes into drug rehabilitation, which puts her life into perspective. Sarah once lived with Allen Ginsberg in Berlin and hosts a Howl full moon celebration every year at her house. Sarah later gives Ruth invaluable support following Nate's death, and Ruth moves into Sarah's house at Topanga Canyon.

=== Maya Fisher ===
Maya Fisher (2003–unknown), played alternately by twins Brenna and Bronwyn Tosh, is Nate and Lisa's daughter. After Nate's death, Brenda (her stepmother) is given custody of Maya. After learning of Nate's affair with George's daughter, Brenda gives temporary custody to Ruth so that she can process her grief. Maya moves back in with Brenda after Brenda gives birth to her half-sister, Willa and is eventually fully adopted by Brenda, who raises her as if she were her own daughter. In the final scenes, she's seen celebrating her sister's first birthday, as a little girl at David and Keith's wedding (still holding her favorite puppet toy, a monkey), and as a woman in her twenties at Ruth's funeral and Claire and Ted's wedding.

=== Nikolai ===
Nikolai, played by Ed O'Ross, is the Russian owner of Blossom d'Amour Flower Shop where Ruth Fisher works for a time. He is Ruth's lover for almost two years. Nikolai is in serious debt which culminates several encounters with a Russian mob. When they break his legs because he is unable to repay his debt, he recuperates at the Fishers' house. Ruth takes this as an opportunity to expand their relationship, but instead causes more tension when she pays off Nikolai's debt with Nathaniel's life insurance policy. Several weeks after their break-up, Ruth resigns from Blossom d'Amour so that she can spend more time with her newborn grandchild, Maya. Nikolai had a son and wife who died before he moved to the U.S. He has a brief cameo in episode #5.9 ("Ecotone") when Ruth envisions herself shooting all of her ex-lovers with a rifle to the tune of carnival music in a bloodless shooting gallery.

=== Gabriel Dimas ===
Gabriel "Gabe" Dimas (1983–2002), played by Eric Balfour, is Claire's boyfriend during her senior year in high school. Claire thinks she is in love, but after Gabe tells the entire school that she slept with him and sucked his toes, an upset Claire gets her revenge by placing a severed foot from a deceased person into Gabe's school locker. The two do not speak to each other again until the death of Gabe's brother. Gabe's mother blames Gabe for the death, and his stepfather attacks him at the funeral. Soon after, Gabe overdoses and Claire tries to help him recover. However, he gets into more trouble: holding up a convenience store, stealing the Fishers' embalming fluid to use for extra-potent joints, and pulling a gun on another driver while Claire is trying to drive him to a secluded area. After that, Claire breaks off ties with him. She later receives closure from a fantasy scene showing that she believes Gabe has died and that he is at peace in death and able to see his younger brother Anthony.

=== Bernard Chenowith ===
Dr. Bernard Asa Chenowith (1939–2003), played by Robert Foxworth, is Brenda and Billy's father who worked as a celebrity psychiatrist with his wife Margaret, whom he met when she was a college intern. Bernard was raised Jewish but ultimately became an atheist. In the 1970s, the Chenowiths made headlines when they allowed their daughter to undergo testing by the controversial Dr. Gareth Feinberg for her brilliant, yet uncontrollable behavior. Bernard and Margaret briefly separate in 2002 for reasons of infidelity but soon reconcile and renew their vows. He succumbs to stomach cancer in 2003.

=== Taylor Benoit ===
Taylor Benoit, played by Aysia Polk, is Keith's niece. Her mother Karla is a drug addict and not in a fit state to look after the young girl. Keith and David look after her for some time during season 2. She is quite often rude and unhappy due to her poor upbringing. After Keith is suspended from the police force, Taylor goes to live with Keith's parents, Roderick and Lucille Charles (played by James Pickens Jr. and Beverly Todd).

=== Russell Corwin ===
Russell Corwin, played by Ben Foster, is Claire's sexually-ambiguous classmate at art school and one-time boyfriend. Claire initially suspects that Russell is gay. However, Russell claims that he is not, and starts seeing Claire. Later, Russell has sex with his teacher, Olivier Castro-Staal. Claire subsequently breaks up with him and, learning she is pregnant, gets an abortion. When he finds out about the abortion, Russell is distraught. He begins sleeping with Claire's friend Anita, despite having feelings for Claire. Claire enjoys great success with an art project that Russell helps her begin, but Claire takes all the credit, and also gets a gallery showing. Russell is infuriated and gets into a fight with Claire at the exhibit. She drops out of art school and does not see him again for several months. When she runs into him at another showing, he tells her he had been hit by a car, and that while most believe he is in love with fellow student/artist, Jimmy (to whom he gave a drunken blow job), he confides in Claire that he is merely jealous and wishes he could be as talented as she. In their last moment together in the series, Russell gives her a kiss on the cheek and rushes away. Shortly afterward, Russell causes a scene at the same gallery while attempting to deface a sculpture.

=== Parker McKenna ===
Parker McKenna played by Marina Black, is Claire's best friend during her senior year of high school. Parker is a rebellious transfer student from a private school, although she appears to be a "goody two-shoes", who attempts to start a friendship with Claire Fisher. The friendship blossoms, but after finding out that Parker had cheated on her SATs and had been accepted into better colleges than Claire, the friendship is broken off until Claire learns it's better to have one friend than no friends at all. Parker tells Claire that the Chinese holistic herbs that her Aunt Sarah sent her are actually magic mushrooms and the two trip together. After Claire enrolls in art school, Parker is caught when the person who took the SATs for Parker was arrested. Parker enrolled in community college as a result. The two don't speak again after graduation.

=== Anthony and Durrell Charles-Fisher ===
Anthony Charles-Fisher, played by C. J. Sanders, is David and Keith's adopted 8-year-old son. The couple meet young Anthony at an "adoption picnic" where David feels an instant bond with the boy. After Mary, David and Keith's surrogate, announces her pregnancy, the plans to adopt Anthony slowly fade away. However, after Mary gets her period, Keith and David try to adopt Anthony, at which time they learn he also has an older brother. In the last scenes of the last episode, Anthony is shown as an adult attending his aunt Claire's wedding in the company of a male companion.

Durrell Charles-Fisher, played by Kendré Berry, is David and Keith's adopted 11-year-old son. At first when going back to adopt younger brother Anthony, David and Keith do not realize they will be adopting his older brother also. After two weeks of Durrell testing the waters and Keith's patience, Keith believes it is time for the brothers to go. David then sticks up for the boys in front of Keith and the social worker, and the adoption becomes permanent. Slowly, Durrell becomes comfortable in his surroundings after David and Keith set some boundaries and show Durrell some support and nurturing. At age 11, Durrell expresses interest in becoming a fireman. However, in the last scenes of the last episode, he is shown spending time with his father David in the prep room. He most likely inherits the operation of Fisher and Sons Funeral Home after David's retirement, as he is shown conducting Ruth Fisher's funeral in the final minutes of the series. Durrell becomes involved with a woman and has three children with her: Matthew, Keith Jr., and Katie.

=== Bettina ===
Bettina, played by Kathy Bates, is Sarah's caretaker. Bettina's brash personality and Ruth's reserved nature complement each other and they form a strong friendship. She prides herself on her ability to see people through drug detoxes; although she has done quite a few drugs herself, she seems to be someone who can still run her life without the drugs running her. She does have a reckless streak; she eggs Ruth on to shoplifting once, and encourages her to take a Vicodin when they are overseeing one of Sarah's detoxes. Bettina was married three times—her second husband cheated on her and her first and third husbands left her a widow. Bettina has a daughter who got caught up in a militia movement in Montana.

=== Olivier Castro-Staal ===
Olivier Castro-Staal, played by Peter Macdissi, teaches Form and Space at LAC-Arts. Claire, Russell, and Billy Chenowith were all his students. Olivier is bisexual and has flings with Russell and Billy, but ends up living with Billy and Brenda's mother, Margaret. Despite having a rocky relationship with Claire, he is the one who makes the recommendation for her photographer assistant's job in New York.

=== Arthur Martin ===
Arthur Martin, played by Rainn Wilson, is an intern at Fisher & Diaz Funeral Home from March to November 2003, though it was intended to be permanent. The eccentric Arthur was orphaned at the age of 5 and was home schooled by his great Aunt Pearl. After his aunt died of old age, Arthur went on to college to study music but, after discovering his major was not what he had hoped, Arthur attended mortuary school to become a funeral director. During his senior year, he receives a live-in apprenticeship from the Fishers and Federico. Things soon decline after Ruth Fisher starts thinking their budding friendship is becoming physical. When she realizes he is not able to relate to her in a sexual, more mature relationship, she stops the relationship and acts coldly to Arthur during his attempts at conversation. When Ruth's daughter-in-law Lisa goes missing, she is comforted by George Sibley, who had been attending one of Fisher & Diaz's funerals. The two become close and marry after only a few months, to Arthur's discomfort. When George moves in, Arthur has a confrontational relationship with him. Later, George's estranged son starts sending boxed feces to them, and Ruth assumes it is a jealous Arthur. When she confronts Arthur, he becomes offended and leaves. After Ruth talks about pressing charges against Arthur, George tells her that it is his son who has been sending the feces. Arthur has a brief cameo in episode #5.9 ("Ecotone"), when Ruth imagines herself shooting all of her ex-boyfriends (and eventually her dead husband Nathaniel) with a shotgun to the tune of circus music.

=== Anita Miller ===
Anita Miller, played by Sprague Grayden, is Claire's former best friend and roommate. The two met at art school and develop a Laverne and Shirley-like relationship. The relationship is broken off when Claire is abandoned by her friends soon after she leaves art school for good. They briefly meet again towards the end of the series, and Anita makes it clear that she was hurt by Claire's lack of contact.

=== Edie ===
Edie, played by Mena Suvari, is a free-spirited lesbian artist who becomes a friend and (briefly) a lover of Claire. Their relationship ends when Edie gets fed up with Claire's sexual ambivalence.

=== Jimmy ===
Jimmy, played by Peter Facinelli, was a friend of Claire's during her time at art school. At first Jimmy wanted a relationship with her, but realized in the end that she didn't. They engaged in a brief sexual relationship where he was responsible for giving Claire her first orgasm using the coital alignment technique which he refers to by its slang name "grinding the corn". He also introduced Claire to her first gallery owner. He was often drinking and getting high. He remained a friend of Anita and Claire, until Claire quit art school.

=== Hiram Gunderson ===
Hiram Gunderson, played by Ed Begley Jr., is a fling of Ruth's. A divorcée and an environmentalist (he drove a hybrid Toyota Prius car, while Begley drives an electric vehicle in real life), Hiram was once a major chef (he received a rave review from the Chicago Tribune) who gave up cooking to become a hairdresser. One of his clients, Ruth Fisher, was unhappily married and, during frequent camping trips, Hiram taught her how to enjoy sex. After Ruth's husband dies, she initially pushes Hiram away, but then dates him for several months. Their relationship ends when he tells her he has feelings for another woman; to his surprise, she happily sends him on his way. Months later, she calls him to make amends (she is on The Plan at this time) but he mistakenly assumes she wants to reunite, leading to a fight. Several years pass before they meet up again for another camping trip. While on the trip, Ruth realizes she is no longer attracted to Hiram and hitchhikes back home.

=== Ted Fairwell ===
Ted Fairwell, played by Chris Messina, is an attorney at Braeden Chemical Legal Department who becomes Claire Fisher's love interest after she begins working as a temp secretary. Prior to meeting Claire, Ted had a (one-night stand and some "discreet" making out in the men's room of a local bar) relationship with Kirsten, one of Claire's other co-workers at the Legal Department. Ted insists that it is over, making Claire feel at ease when she secretly makes out with him. On their first date, Ted reveals himself to be a conservative Republican, which upsets Claire at the moment when the mood changes to somber after receiving the news of Nate's stroke. Rather than going home, Ted drives Claire to the hospital and stays with her through the night as her emotional support, causing Claire to see that Ted is a positive force in her life. Ted and Claire part ways when Claire moves to New York in the final episode, although when Claire returns to Los Angeles for her mother's funeral in 2025, she and Ted will reunite and marry, and stay together for the rest of Ted's life. His death is not shown in the final episode, but it is implied that he died before Claire as she dies alone in 2085.

=== Carol Ward ===
Carol Ward, played by Catherine O'Hara, is Lisa Kimmel's boss during seasons 2 and 3, a neurotic, self-involved motion picture producer with an unstable demeanor. Her demands on Lisa prove incompatible with Lisa's newfound roles as a wife and mother, leading to a confrontation in which Lisa quits. Carol later appears in Episode 52, in a video flashback to 2002 revolving around Nate and Lisa's wedding where she expresses her views on relationships and marriage.

=== Joe ===
Joe, played by Justin Theroux, is a gifted French horn player and Brenda's boyfriend for the first half of season 4. They become neighbors when Brenda returns to L.A. and quickly become friends. Although Brenda is hesitant to start a new relationship, and insists on a period of celibacy, they soon become serious. The couple buy a house together and even tried for a baby. However, Brenda soon becomes tired of Joe's cerebral sexual ambivalence. Their relationship ends when Joe walks in on Nate and Brenda.

=== Angelica ===
Angelica, played by Melissa Marsala, is Vanessa's sister who appears periodically in seasons 2 through 5. An aspiring actress, she brings business to the funeral home when one of her horror film co-stars overdoses on cocaine. In season 2, Vanessa goes behind Rico's back to borrow money from Angelica to for a down payment on a house, causing strain between Angelica and Rico. Later, when she experiences her own financial difficulties, she moves in with Rico and Vanessa but quickly wears out her welcome. In season 4, after Vanessa discovers Rico's affair with Sophia, Angelica helps her confront Sophia and smash her car windows. Despite her generally combative attitude toward Rico, she and her sister remain very close, even after Vanessa asks her to move out.

=== Sophia ===
Sophia, played by Idalis DeLeón, is an erotic dancer with whom Rico has an affair in seasons 3 and 4. Although their relationship was initially only sexual on their first encounter, Rico continues to show her affection for several months by spending time with her and her daughter and buying her gifts. Over time, Sophia begins to take advantage of Rico's time and money. Rico, feeling guilty, breaks things off with Sophia, but Vanessa soon finds out about the affair and kicks Rico out of the house. Rico has sex with Sophia and asks if he can stay with her. Vanessa and Angelica confront Sophia, but she seems unfazed by them. They smash in her car windows with a baseball bat, and when she confronts Rico about the encounter, they break things off for good.

=== Roger Pasquese ===
Roger Pasquese, played by Matt Malloy, is a Hollywood movie producer who became Keith's employer in season 5. David and Roger had gotten into a fight towards the end of season 4, which resulted in Roger opening a lawsuit against him. The case was dropped when Keith agreed to allow Roger to perform oral sex on him. After this initial meeting, Roger employs Keith on an as-needed basis as a body guard and personal assistant. Keith and Roger's relationship ends near the end of the series when he discovers that Roger has filmed their one sexual encounter, and frequently plays it back with other sexual partners. Despite being gay, Roger remains in an open marriage with the mother of his two children.

=== Kroehner ===
Kroehner Service International is a mortuary conglomerate that tries to get Fisher & Sons out of business in the first two seasons. In the first season, a smarmy company representative named Matthew Gilardi (Gary Hershberger) tries buying the Fishers out. When he fails, his boss Mitzi Dalton-Huntley, played by Julie White, fires him and tries buying the Fishers out, but she also fails. Ultimately, Kroehner Service International files for bankruptcy at the end of the second season, though their bankruptcy was most likely not connected to the Fishers.

=== Willa Chenowith ===
Willa Fisher Chenowith (born 2005) is Brenda and Nate's daughter, born prematurely, six weeks after Nate's death. Willa's birth is unexpected, since Brenda was due to deliver 2 months later. Several weeks after her birth, Willa is healthy enough to go home, a cause for celebration between the two families. Brenda worries about her daughter's health for some time after, but Willa is completely fine. In the final scenes, she's seen celebrating her first birthday, as a little girl at David and Keith's wedding, and as a young woman at Ruth's funeral.

=== Jake ===
Jake, played by Michael Weston, is a criminal who appears in seasons four and five. He carjacks David and takes him on a night-long joyride through the city, beating him, forcing him to do drugs, and ultimately putting a gun in his mouth after dousing him with gasoline, before driving away in David's car, sparing him. Jake is later arrested and thrown in jail for numerous violent crimes, and David visits him there to try to get closure on his ordeal; however, Jake is completely detached from reality and provides no answers, so David satisfies himself that Jake is visibly miserable in prison and leaves, telling Jake he is never coming back.

=== Gary Deitman ===
Gary, played by David Norona, is Claire's guidance counselor.

== Notes ==
a: The tattoos were of their favorite fictional characters: Nathaniel and Isabel, based on a book their father bought them when they were children. – there was speculation that the two siblings were intimately involved during their childhood, until the episode "Static" showed they hadn't been.
