= Towelhead (novel) =

2005 novel by Alicia Erian

- Cover of the 2005 Simon & Schuster edition
- Author: Alicia Erian
- Language: English
- Publication date: 2005
- Publication place: United States

Towelhead is a novel written by American novelist Alicia Erian and first published April 6, 2005. Alicia Erian is the first holder of the Newhouse Visiting Professorship of Creative Writing at Wellesley College in Massachusetts.

== Plot ==
The novel is about a thirteen-year-old girl coming of age. Physically developed for her age and looking slightly older, she does not understand how to deal with the effect she has on older men. After her American mother's boyfriend starts behaving inappropriately towards her, her mother sends her from Syracuse, New York, to live with her Lebanese father in Houston, Texas, believing he will be a strong disciplining force in teaching her how to be more modest. Her father's stricter discipline, coming from a culture she has not grown up in and does not understand, only makes it more difficult to comprehend her surroundings, which include a bigoted Army reservist she is attracted to and a liberal couple.

== Adaptation ==
The novel has been adapted into a film, Towelhead, by screenwriter and director Alan Ball. The film starred newcomer Summer Bishil in the lead role and includes actors Aaron Eckhart, Toni Collette, Maria Bello, and Peter Macdissi. It premiered at the Toronto International Film Festival on Saturday, September 8, 2007 and at the 2008 Sundance Film Festival on January 19, 2008. It is currently in DVD release.
