= The Nest (2020 film) =

2020 psychological drama film directed by Sean Durkin

- Theatrical release poster
- Directed by: Sean Durkin
- Screenplay by: Sean Durkin
- Produced by: Ed Guiney; Rose Garnett; Derrin Schlesinger; Sean Durkin; Christina Piovesan; Amy Jackson
- Starring: Jude Law; Carrie Coon; Charlie Shotwell; Oona Roche; Adeel Akhtar
- Cinematography: Mátyás Erdély
- Edited by: Matthew Hannam
- Music by: Richard Reed Parry
- Production companies: FilmNation Entertainment; BBC Films; Telefilm Canada; Element Pictures; Substitute Films
- Distributed by: IFC Films (United States); Elevation Pictures (Canada); Picturehouse Entertainment (United Kingdom)
- Release dates: January 26, 2020 (Sundance); September 18, 2020 (Canada/United States); August 27, 2021 (United Kingdom)
- Running time: 107 minutes
- Countries: United Kingdom; Canada; United States
- Language: English
- Box office: $2.1 million

The Nest is a 2020 psychological drama film written, directed, and produced by Sean Durkin. The film stars Jude Law, Carrie Coon, Charlie Shotwell, Oona Roche, and Adeel Akhtar.

The Nest had its world premiere at the Sundance Film Festival on January 26, 2020, and was released in the United States and Canada on September 18, 2020, by IFC Films and Elevation Pictures respectively.

== Plot ==
In the late 1980s, Rory and Allison O'Hara live a middle-class life in New York City with their kids Samantha "Sam" and Benjamin "Ben", the former born from Allison's previous relationship.

Allison teaches horseriding, while Rory works in the financial field. Believing his opportunities in the States are limited, Rory persuades Allison to relocate with him to London, where he plans to return to the firm of his former employer Arthur Davis. Despite Allison's initial misgivings, the family moves into a huge old mansion in Surrey where Rory persuades Allison to start a horse farm on the property and brings her horse, Richmond, over from the States. Construction begins on a stable while Ben and Sam are enrolled in separate schools. Rory later takes Allison to high-class dinner parties with Arthur and his colleagues. However, the family has some difficulty adjusting, as their secluded location and respective commutes make it difficult for the children to get to school on time.

Several weeks later, construction abruptly stops on the stable. Learning that Rory never paid the builders, Allison discovers that his bank account is nearly empty. Rory promises he will have money soon, but Allison is forced to provide for the family by cutting into her hidden cash fund. Allison bristles at Rory's efforts to appear high-class while they remain nearly broke. At work, Rory proposes that Arthur sell his company to a larger American firm looking for a London office.

After brief consideration, Arthur refuses. Back at the mansion, Richmond collapses in pain and Allison is forced to go to a neighbouring farmer, who puts the horse down. Rather than go home following Arthur's rejection, Rory pays a visit to his mother, who shows no interest in his family and accuses Rory of abandoning her. Rory returns home late and gets into an argument with Allison over their financial woes and Rory's reckless, delusional behaviour.

In order to provide income to the household, Allison begins working as a farmhand. Allison's relationships with her children also become strained when Sam makes some disreputable friends and Ben gets into a fight with some school bullies. Rory and his colleague Steve arrange a potentially lucrative deal with a Norwegian fish-farming corporation. That night, he and Allison attend a dinner with Steve and their prospective clients while Sam and her friends throw a house party.

As the party gets out of control, Ben flees outside and witnesses Richmond's carcass being pushed to the surface of the grave due to improper burial. During the dinner, Allison openly mocks Rory before leaving the restaurant, taking the car and getting drunk at a nightclub. Rory attempts to downplay Allison's behaviour but his clients opt to go into business with Steve while cutting him out. Rory tries to take a taxi back to Surrey and confesses his many indiscretions to the driver, claiming his job is "pretending to be rich". With Rory's confessions making it clear that he is both broke and a liar, the driver anticipates that he will be unable to pay for the long fare and leaves him in the middle of nowhere.

The next morning, Allison wakes up hungover in her parked car and drives home, finding the house trashed after the party. Ben shows her Richmond's grave, where the carcass has risen almost completely to the surface. As Allison breaks down over the grave, Sam and Ben agree to make breakfast. Rory finishes the long walk home and finds his family seated at the table. He starts proposing a new business idea and another relocation, but Allison tells him to stop. Rory breaks down in tears; Sam hugs him, then prepares a seat for him with them.

== Cast ==
- Jude Law as Rory O'Hara
- Carrie Coon as Allison O'Hara
- Charlie Shotwell as Benjamin "Ben" O'Hara
- Oona Roche as Samantha "Sam" O'Hara
- Adeel Akhtar as Steve
- Anne Reid as Rory's Mum
- Michael Culkin as Arthur Davis
- Wendy Crewson as Allison's Mum
- Tattiawna Jones as Coach
- John Ross Harkin and Tobias Macey as The Builders
- James Nelson-Joyce as Taxi Driver
- Tanya Allen as Margy

== Production ==
The project was announced in April 2018, with Jude Law and Carrie Coon set to star for writer and director Sean Durkin. Filming began in September 2018 in Canada for one week before moving to England. The family mansion in the story was filmed at Nether Winchendon House in Buckinghamshire.

== Release ==
It had its world premiere at the Sundance Film Festival on January 26, 2020. Shortly after, IFC Films acquired distribution rights to the film. It was theatrically released on September 18, 2020 and on Video on demand (VOD) on November 17, 2020. In November 2023 The Nest was shown on BBC2.

== Reception ==
=== Box office ===
The Nest grossed $137,852 in North America and $1.9 million in other territories, for a worldwide total of $2.1 million.

=== Critical response ===
On the review aggregator website Rotten Tomatoes, 90% of 191 critics' reviews are positive, with an average rating of 7.5/10. The website's consensus reads: "An effective pairing of period setting and timeless themes, The Nest wrings additional tension out of its unsettling story with an outstanding pair of lead performances." Metacritic, which uses a weighted average, assigned the film a score of 80 out of 100, based on 37 critics, indicating "generally favorable" reviews.

The Nest was screened at the 2020 Deauville American Film Festival where it won the Grand Special Prize, the International Critics' prize and the Revelation Prize.

The film was named to the Toronto International Film Festival's year-end Canada's Top Ten list for feature films.

=== Awards ===
| Award | Date of ceremony | Category | Nominees | Result | Ref. |
|---|---|---|---|---|---|
| British Independent Film Awards | December 5, 2021 | Best Director | Sean Durkin | Nominated | |
| British Independent Film Awards | December 5, 2021 | Best Actress | Carrie Coon | Nominated | |
| British Independent Film Awards | December 5, 2021 | Best Actor | Jude Law | Nominated | |
| British Independent Film Awards | December 5, 2021 | Best Screenplay | Sean Durkin | Nominated | |
| British Independent Film Awards | December 5, 2021 | Best British Independent Film | Sean Durkin, Ed Guiney, Derrin Schlesinger, Rose Garnett, Amy Jackson, Christina Piovesan | Nominated | |
| British Independent Film Awards | December 5, 2021 | Best Cinematography | Mátyás Erdély | Nominated | |
| Canadian Screen Awards | May 20, 2021 | Best Picture | Ed Guiney, Derrin Schlesinger, Rose Garnett, Sean Durkin | Nominated | |
| Canadian Screen Awards | May 20, 2021 | Best Director | Sean Durkin | Nominated | |
| Canadian Screen Awards | May 20, 2021 | Best Actress | Carrie Coon | Nominated | |
| Canadian Screen Awards | May 20, 2021 | Best Original Screenplay | Sean Durkin | Nominated | |
| Canadian Screen Awards | May 20, 2021 | Best Sound Editing | Paul Germann, Brennan Mercer, Martin Gwynn Jones | Nominated | |
| Chicago Film Critics Association Awards | December 21, 2020 | Best Actress | Carrie Coon | Nominated | |
| Deauville Film Festival | September 4–13, 2020 | Critics Award | Sean Durkin | Won | |
| Deauville Film Festival | September 4–13, 2020 | Special Prize | Sean Durkin | Won | |
| Deauville Film Festival | September 4–13, 2020 | Revelations Prize | Sean Durkin | Won | |
| Florida Film Critics Circle Awards | December 21, 2020 | Best Actress | Carrie Coon | Nominated | |
| Gotham Independent Film Awards | January 11, 2021 | Best Actor | Jude Law | Nominated | |
| Gotham Independent Film Awards | January 11, 2021 | Best Actress | Carrie Coon | Nominated | |
| National Board of Review Awards | January 26, 2021 | Top 10 Independent Films | | Won | |
| Vancouver Film Critics Circle Awards | March 8, 2021 | Best Screenplay for a Canadian Film | Sean Durkin | Won | |
| Vancouver Film Critics Circle Awards | March 8, 2021 | Best Canadian Film | | Nominated | |
| Vancouver Film Critics Circle Awards | March 8, 2021 | Best Director in a Canadian Film | Sean Durkin | Nominated | |
| Vancouver Film Critics Circle Awards | March 8, 2021 | Best Actress in a Canadian Film | Carrie Coon | Nominated | |
