= Here and Now (2018 TV series) =

2018 American television series

- Genre: Dark comedy; Drama
- Created by: Alan Ball
- Starring: Holly Hunter; Tim Robbins; Daniel Zovatto; Jerrika Hinton; Raymond Lee; Sosie Bacon; Joe Williamson; Andy Bean; Peter Macdissi
- Composer: Michael Penn
- Country of origin: United States
- Original language: English
- No. of seasons: 1
- No. of episodes: 10

Production
- Executive producers: Alan Ball; Peter Macdissi; David Knoller
- Producer: Steve Oster
- Running time: 52–59 minutes
- Production companies: Your Face Goes Here Entertainment; HBO Entertainment

Original release
- Network: HBO
- Release: February 11 – April 15, 2018

Here and Now is an American drama television series created by Alan Ball. The series consists of 10 episodes and premiered on HBO on February 11, 2018. Starring Holly Hunter and Tim Robbins, the series focuses on a contemporary multiracial family in the Portland area. The show's plot involves many issues including race, identity, and mental illness.

On April 25, 2018, HBO cancelled the series after one season.

== Cast and characters ==
=== Main ===
- Holly Hunter as Audrey Bayer, a therapist
- Tim Robbins as Greg Boatwright, Audrey's husband and philosophy professor
- Jerrika Hinton as Ashley Collins, adopted by the Bayer-Boatwrights from Liberia, now creator and owner of a retail fashion website
- Raymond Lee as Duc Bayer-Boatwright, adopted from Vietnam when he was five, now a successful life coach and womanizer
- Daniel Zovatto as Ramon Bayer-Boatwright, adopted from an orphanage in Colombia at 18 months, now a college senior studying video game design
- Sosie Bacon as Kristen Bayer-Boatwright, a junior in high school and her parents' only biological child
- Joe Williamson as Malcolm Collins, Ashley's husband and Duc's best friend, an assistant personal trainer for the Portland women's soccer team
- Andy Bean as Henry, a free spirit who falls in love with Ramon
- Peter Macdissi as Dr. Farid Shokrani, Ramon's therapist
- Marwan Salama as Navid Shokrani
- Necar Zadegan as Layla Shokrani

=== Guest starring ===
- Trent Garrett as Randy
- Kevin Bigley as Michael
- Cynthia Ettinger as Lydia
- Ted Levine as Ike Bayer, Audrey's schizophrenic brother
- Niousha Noor as Donya, Dr. Shokrani's mother

== Production ==
HBO ordered the series in July 2016.

=== Casting ===
On January 31, 2018, it was announced that Stephanie Arcila and Erin Carufel signed onto the series in the recurring roles of Mami and Wendy, respectively.

=== Filming ===
The series is partially filmed in Portland, Oregon.

=== Marketing ===
The teaser trailer of the first season was released in December 2017.

== Episodes ==
No.	Title	Directed by	Written by	Original release date	U.S. viewers (millions)
1	"Eleven Eleven"	Alan Ball	Alan Ball	February 11, 2018	0.541
The Bayer-Boatwrights are a multiracial family consisting of the patriarch Greg, (Tim Robbins) a professor – having an affair with a prostitute – who is having his 60th birthday, organized by his wife Audrey (Holly Hunter) and only biological child, Kristen (Sosie Bacon) an introverted high school student. They also have three adopted children: Ashley (Jerrika Hinton), adopted from Liberia, a fashion designer who is married with a biological daughter; Duc (Raymond Lee), adopted from Vietnam, a life coach; and Ramon (Daniel Zovatto), adopted from Colombia, who is in a relationship with free-spirited Henry (Andy Bean). The party goes awry when Ramon starts hallucinating and seeing the figures 11:11 constantly. He starts to see a therapist, and Audrey suspects it is schizophrenia.
2	"It's Coming"	Uta Briesewitz	Alan Ball	February 18, 2018	0.368
Ramon notices during his therapy session conducted by therapist Farid (Fred) Shrokani, (Peter Macdissi) both that the woman in Ramon's dream is the therapist's mother and that 11:11 is his therapists birthday. The therapist also has a gender-fluid son who likes to cross dress and wear a hijab. Kristen has sex for the first time with a model whom Ashley brought to their father's birthday and contracts an STD. They visit a Planned Parenthood clinic and Kristen kicks a protester in the groin and she and Ashley are arrested. Duc gets his book published and has various amounts of one night stands. Greg tells his students in a lecture to leave and enjoy life and one of his students ask if he is okay. Audrey decides to host a family meeting to discuss the state of Ramon's health without Ramon; Kristen tells him, and Ramon barges in and tells them it's his decision. Greg drives down and hits a fork in the road, sees 11 11 on a road sign, and then heads in the wrong direction.
3	"If a Deer Shits in the Woods"	Uta Briesewitz	Mohamad El Masri	February 25, 2018	0.385
4	"Hide and Seek"	Jeremy Podeswa	Nancy Oliver	March 4, 2018	0.300
5	"From Sun Up To Sun Down"	Jeremy Podeswa	J.R. Edwards	March 11, 2018	0.333
6	"Fight, Death"	Lisa Cholodenko	Wes Taylor	March 18, 2018	0.357
7	"Wake"	Lisa Cholodenko	Tanya Barfield	March 25, 2018	0.384
8	"Yes"	Janicza Bravo	Nancy Oliver	April 1, 2018	0.364
9	"Dream Logic"	Minkie Spiro	Charles Yu	April 8, 2018	0.369
10	"It's Here"	Jeremy Podeswa	Alan Ball	April 15, 2018	0.382
Ramon smells a fire, which Haley confirms in the treehouse, so Ramon drops Haley out of the treehouse onto the ground. Audrey, Ashely and Kristen take her to the ER. Ramon sees a man on fire and tries to pursue him, while Duc hammers his father on sleeping with an Asian escort. Greg confronts him on his celibacy lies and the men have a fallout. Farid feels even more guilt about his childhood and he continues whipping his own back as punishment, to the point where his wife and son leave him. Kristen and Navid also fight when Navid just wants to be friends instead of having sex, however they make up before he leaves. Ashley gets the job interview and realizes she was just a diversity hire which makes her doubt if she should take the job. Audrey appears on a morning talk show, and is confronted by her boss's ties to child labour and suicide prevention techniques. Duc and Carmen spend the night together and she senses that he has pain from his biological mother who was a prostitute. They begin to have a healthy sexual relationship afterwards. Ramon plays the game he created, sees the glitches telling him to "go to the mountain." Greg visits Ike who has the same problems as Ramon. Farid, now with blood over his shirt and back, visits his imam, speaks about Islam and search for the answers in life. When the clock strikes 11:11, Mount Hood erupts. The final shot shows Ramon on Mount Hood confronting the man on fire.

== Reception ==
On Rotten Tomatoes, the first season has a 24% approval rating based 49 reviews from critics, with an average rating of 4.54/10. The critics consensus reads, "Here and Now clearly has a point it wants to make, but a nebulous plot and unfocused character development stand in the way of its potential." On Metacritic, it has a score of 46 out of 100 based on 31 reviews.
