= Summer Bishil =

American actress

- Born: Summer Yasmine Bishil; July 17, 1988 (age 38); Pasadena, California, U.S.
- Occupation: Actress
- Years active: 2005–present
- Height: 63 in (5.3 ft)

Summer Yasmine Bishil (born July 17, 1988) is an American actress. She first came to prominence starring as Jasira in the 2007 film Towelhead, for which she was nominated for an Independent Spirit Award for Best Female Lead. Over the following few years, she had small roles in films and TV series like The Last Airbender (2010) and 90210 (2011) before starring in the short-lived ABC series Lucky 7 (2013). She starred as Margo Hanson on the Syfy fantasy drama series The Magicians from 2015 to 2020.

== Early life and education ==
Bishil was born in Pasadena, California and is the youngest of three children. Her mother is of half-Mexican descent while her father is of Indian ancestry. In 1991, when Bishil was three years old, the family moved to Saudi Arabia and then to Bahrain, where she and her brother attended British and American schools.

The September 11 attacks prompted her family to return to the United States. They moved to a Mormon community in San Diego where she attended a regular public high school for a week. Because of the post-9/11 tension in the U.S., her schoolmates did not welcome her kindly. She stated that the return was not easy: "I hated it. I was called a whore on the first day of school, and somebody said they thought my dad funded terrorism. I just knew that nobody was ever going to want to be my friend there. I had panic attacks the first year of my life here." The family later moved to Arcadia, where her mother home schooled her. She took classes at Citrus College in Glendora, California.

== Career ==
Bishil started acting lessons at age 14. Within a year, she was signed to a contract with a manager and agency. Bishil's first role was on the short-lived Nickelodeon television show Just for Kicks, followed by appearances in several other children's shows.

Bishil's breakthrough performance came as the lead in Alan Ball's film, Towelhead in 2007, an adaptation of the novel of the same name. Slate critic Dana Stevens said, "Her performance is the truest thing in a movie that, for all its good intentions, feels thoroughly phony and mildly embarrassing, like an extended PSA about inappropriate touching." Bob Strauss, who writes for several Los Angeles newspapers, states that Bishil, "...is one of the finest natural film actresses to emerge in years." Gary Goldstein in a September 12 Los Angeles Times review of the movie Towelhead, stated that, "...newcomer Summer Bishil turns in a gutsy, quietly riveting performance as Jasira."

In 2009, she filmed Wayne Kramer's project, Crossing Over, starring Harrison Ford, Ray Liotta and Ashley Judd, a portrayal that received some favorable notice from Associated Press's Jay Reiner. She was chosen to portray Azula in M. Night Shyamalan's 2010 film The Last Airbender, and was planned to be the focus of the planned but never-produced sequel.

In 2013, Bishil was cast as Samira one of the lead roles on the short-lived ABC drama Lucky 7. In late 2014, Bishil was cast in the role of Margo Hanson in the Syfy drama series The Magicians, which ended after five seasons in 2020.

== Filmography ==
Film roles
Year	Title	Role	Notes
2007	Towelhead	Jasira Maroun	
2009	Crossing Over	Taslima Jahangir	
2010	Mooz-lum	Iman	
2010	Public Relations	Sara	
2010	The Last Airbender	Azula	Cameo
2013	Pop Star	Priscilla	
2018	Under the Silver Lake	The Girlfriend	
2022	Four Samosas	Rina	

Television roles
Year	Title	Role	Notes
2005	Days of Our Lives	Stacey	Episode #1.10164
2006	Just for Kicks	Stacey	Episode: "Premiere Episode: Part 2"
2006	Drake & Josh	Tabitha	Episode: "Josh Runs Into Oprah"
2006	Hannah Montana	Rachel	Episode: "Good Golly, Miss Dolly"
2006	Return to Halloweentown	Aneesa	Television film
2009	Three Rivers	Karen Rollins	Episode: "Good Intentions"
2010	The Whole Truth	Michelle Penner	Episode: "Young Love"
2011	90210	Leila Shirazi	4 episodes
2013	Lucky 7	Samira	Main role; 8 episodes
2013	Blast Vegas	Serena	Television film
2014	Law & Order: Special Victims Unit	Heba Salim	Episode: "Criminal Stories"
2015	iZombie	Eliza Marquette	Episode: "Flight of the Living Dead"
2015–2020	The Magicians	Margo	Main role; 65 episodes

== Awards and nominations ==
Year	Award	Category	Work	Result	Refs
2008	Young Hollywood Awards	One to Watch	Towelhead	Won	
2008	Independent Spirit Awards	Best Female Lead	Towelhead	Nominated	
