= Uncle Frank (film) =

2020 film directed by Alan Ball

- Official release poster
- Directed by: Alan Ball
- Written by: Alan Ball
- Produced by: Bill Block; Michael Costigan; Jay Van Hoy; Stephanie Meurer; Peter Macdissi; Alan Ball
- Starring: Paul Bettany; Sophia Lillis; Peter Macdissi; Judy Greer; Steve Zahn; Lois Smith; Margo Martindale; Stephen Root; Colton Ryan
- Cinematography: Khalid Mohtaseb
- Edited by: Jonathan Alberts
- Music by: Nathan Barr
- Production companies: Miramax; Your Face Goes Here Entertainment; Byblos Entertainment; Cota Films; Parts & Labor
- Distributed by: Amazon Studios
- Release dates: January 25, 2020 (Sundance); November 25, 2020 (United States)
- Running time: 95 minutes
- Country: United States
- Language: English

Uncle Frank is a 2020 American comedy drama film written, directed, and co-produced by Alan Ball. The film stars Paul Bettany and Sophia Lillis. Set in the 1970s, Uncle Frank is a road movie about a gay man who confronts his past.

It had its world premiere at the Sundance Film Festival on January 25, 2020. It was released on November 25, 2020, by Amazon Studios.

== Plot ==
In 1973, 18-year-old Beth Bledsoe moves from her home in Creekville, South Carolina, to attend college in New York City. Her uncle Frank Bledsoe is a college professor there, living with his girlfriend Charlotte. Frank is the relative she feels closest to as he is more refined and thoughtful than the rest of the family. Four years earlier, Frank had provided Beth with life-changing advice to always be herself, no matter what other people thought.

In college, Beth meets a boy, Bruce, and almost loses her virginity to him. Later, she shows up with Bruce unannounced to a party at Frank's apartment. Through events that happen at the party, she discovers that Frank is secretly gay and has actually been living with an Arabic Muslim man named Walid ("Wally") for over ten years. Frank rejects Bruce's sexual advance and later cares for Beth when she gets too drunk. He pleads with her not to tell anyone else in their family his secret, and she agrees.

The next day, Beth's grandfather and Frank's father, Daddy Mac, dies of a sudden heart attack. Frank agrees to drive Beth back to South Carolina for the funeral. Wally asks to come along and meet Frank's family, but Frank refuses, not yet ready to reveal the truth to them. However, Wally rents a car and follows them most of the way there. When Frank catches him, he agrees to let Wally come but insists Wally stay in a motel during the funeral services, fearful of what the locals might do if their true relationship is discovered.

Throughout their journey, Frank has flashbacks to his teenage years when he developed a sexual relationship with a local boy named Samuel. His father eventually caught them in bed together and called Frank an abomination against God as well as several homophobic slurs and insults based on his Christian beliefs. To cope with these memories, Frank begins secretly drinking; he asks Beth not to tell Wally, revealing that Frank is a recovering alcoholic.

After the funeral, Beth and Frank arrive home for a family potluck. At the reading of the will, Frank learns he has been cut out of his inheritance, and, through his lawyer, his dead father exposes Frank's homosexuality to the family in disgust and shame. An emotional Frank flees, driving away erratically while heavily drinking. A panicked Beth rushes to inform Wally, who drives them to the nearby lake where he suspects Frank went. A final flashback reveals that Frank told Samuel that they could not be together as it displeased God; Frank calls Sam the same slurs that his father said to him. Soon after he finds Samuel's suicide note, which shows that Samuel had internalized Frank's homophobic slurs. He then discovers Samuel's dead body floating in the lake.

In the present, Wally and Beth find Frank's clothes sitting on a dock by the water, but Frank is nowhere to be seen. Wally and Beth return to the motel where Wally grieves for Frank's apparent death. However, a drunken Frank returns, claiming he just went for a swim. An intense argument ensues when Wally confronts Frank for his drinking, leading Frank to punch Wally in the mouth and to call him the same slurs his father said to him before fleeing once again. Frank visits his father's grave before stealing flowers and weeping at Samuel's nearby grave. Wally follows him there, and they reconcile at Samuel's grave as Frank expresses guilt for his death. When Frank laments that he has no family left, Wally reassures him that he is Frank's family and "he knows it, I know it, and God knows it."

After an impassioned speech from Beth in the cemetery, Frank agrees to let Wally meet his family. While Frank's brother-in-law and elderly aunt are unable to accept him due to their Christian beliefs, his siblings and mother have no problem with Frank and warmly welcome Wally into the family with his mother saying, "You are my precious gift from God and nothing will ever change that."

== Cast ==
- Paul Bettany as Frank Bledsoe
  - Cole Doman as young Frank Bledsoe
- Sophia Lillis as Elizabeth Bledsoe
- Peter Macdissi as Walid "Wally" Nadeem
- Steve Zahn as Mike Bledsoe
- Judy Greer as Kitty Bledsoe
- Margo Martindale as Mammaw Bledsoe
- Stephen Root as Daddy Mac
- Lois Smith as Aunt Butch
- Jane McNeill as Neva
- Burgess Jenkins as Beau
- Colton Ryan as Bruce
- Caity Brewer as Marsha
- Michael Perez as Sam Lassiter
- Zach Strum as Tee Dub

== Release ==
It had its world premiere at the Sundance Film Festival on January 25, 2020. Shortly after, Amazon Studios acquired distribution rights to the film. It was released by the studio via Prime Video on November 25, 2020.

== Reception ==
On review aggregator Rotten Tomatoes, the film holds a 77% rating based on 119 reviews, with an average rating of 6.9/10. The site's critics consensus reads: "Uncle Frank finds writer-director Alan Ball still untangling the modern American family dynamic, aided by standout work from Paul Bettany and Sophia Lillis." Metacritic reports a score of 58 out of 100, based on 21 critic reviews, indicating "mixed or average reviews".

== Accolades ==
Year	Award	Category	Nominee(s)	Result	Ref.
2020	Deauville American Film Festival	Grand Prix (Grand Special Prize)	Alan Ball	Nominated	
2020	Deauville American Film Festival	Prix du Public (Audience Award)	Alan Ball	Won	
2020	Indiana Film Journalists Association Awards	Best Actor	Paul Bettany	Nominated	
2020	Indiana Film Journalists Association Awards	Best Ensemble Acting	Uncle Frank	Nominated	
2020	Mill Valley Film Festival	Audience Award (U.S. Cinema)	Alan Ball	Won	
2021	Dorian Awards	LGBTQ Film of the Year	Uncle Frank	Nominated	
2021	GLAAD Media Awards	Outstanding TV Movie	Uncle Frank	Won	
2021	Gold Derby TV Awards	TV movie	Uncle Frank	Nominated	
2021	Golden Nymph Awards	Best Film	Uncle Frank	Won	
2021	Golden Nymph Awards	Best Actor	Paul Bettany	Won	
2021	Golden Nymph Awards	Best Creation	Uncle Frank	Won	
2021	Make-Up Artists and Hair Stylists Guild Awards	Best Period and/or Character Makeup – Television Special, One Hour or More Live Program Series or Movie for Television	Lindsay Irish Desarno and Diane Heller	Nominated	
2021	Primetime Emmy Awards	Outstanding Television Movie	Bob Osher, Andrew Golov, Christopher Tricarico, Josh Peters, Isaac Ericson, Bill Block, Michael Costigan, Jay Van Hoy, Stephanie Meurer, Peter Macdissi and Alan Ball	Nominated	
2021	San Diego Film Critics Society Awards	Best Supporting Actor	Peter Macdissi	Runner-up	
2021	San Diego Film Critics Society Awards	Best Ensemble	Uncle Frank	Nominated	
2021	Satellite Awards	Best Television Film	Uncle Frank	Nominated	
2021	Writers Guild of America Awards	Long Form – Original	Alan Ball	Nominated	
