= Six Feet Under (TV series) =

American television series

- Genre: Black comedy; Comedy-drama; Psychological drama; Tragicomedy
- Created by: Alan Ball
- Showrunner: Alan Ball
- Starring: Peter Krause; Michael C. Hall; Frances Conroy; Lauren Ambrose; Freddy Rodriguez; Mathew St. Patrick; Jeremy Sisto; Rachel Griffiths; James Cromwell; Justina Machado
- Theme music composer: Thomas Newman
- Composer: Richard Marvin
- Country of origin: United States
- Original language: English
- No. of seasons: 5
- No. of episodes: 63 (list of episodes)

Production
- Executive producers: Alan Ball; Robert Greenblatt; David Janollari; Alan Poul; Bruce Eric Kaplan; Rick Cleveland
- Camera setup: Single-camera
- Running time: 46–72 minutes
- Production companies: Actual Size Films; The Greenblatt/Janollari Studio; HBO Entertainment

Original release
- Network: HBO
- Release: June 3, 2001 – August 21, 2005

Six Feet Under is an American drama television series created and produced by Alan Ball for the television network HBO. It premiered on June 3, 2001, and ended on August 21, 2005, after five seasons consisting of 63 episodes.

The show follows the Fisher family, who run a funeral home in Los Angeles, along with their friends and lovers. It stars Peter Krause, Michael C. Hall, Frances Conroy, Lauren Ambrose, Freddy Rodriguez, Mathew St. Patrick, and Rachel Griffiths. It was produced by Actual Size Films and the Greenblatt/Janollari Studio, and was shot on location in Los Angeles and in Hollywood studios.

Six Feet Under received acclaim, particularly for its writing and acting, and drew high ratings. It is regarded as one of the greatest television series of all time. The series finale, "Everyone's Waiting", has also been described as one of the greatest in television. Its awards include nine Emmy Awards, three Actor Awards, three Golden Globe Awards and a Peabody Award.

== Show synopsis ==
The show stars Peter Krause as Nate Fisher, whose funeral director father (Richard Jenkins) dies and bequeaths ownership of the Fisher & Sons funeral home to Nate and his other son David (Michael C. Hall). The Fisher clan also includes widow Ruth Fisher (Frances Conroy) and daughter Claire Fisher (Lauren Ambrose). Other regulars include mortician Federico Diaz (Freddy Rodriguez), Nate's on-again/off-again girlfriend Brenda Chenowith (Rachel Griffiths), and David's long-term boyfriend Keith Charles (Mathew St. Patrick).

On one level, the show is a conventional family drama, dealing with such issues as interpersonal relationships, sex, masculine homosexuality, dysfunction, infidelity, personal growth, and religion. At the same time, it is distinguished by its focus on the topic of death, which it explores on personal, religious, and philosophical levels. Most episodes begin with a death, the cause of which ranges from heart attack to murder to accidental death or sudden infant death syndrome. That death usually sets the thematic tone for each episode, allowing the characters to reflect on their current fortunes and misfortunes in a way that is illuminated by the death and its aftermath.

A recurring plot device consists of a character having an imaginary conversation with the deceased; for example, Nate, David, and Federico sometimes "converse" with the deceased at the beginning of the episode, while the corpse is being embalmed, or during funeral planning or the funeral itself. Sometimes, the characters converse with other deceased characters, most notably Nathaniel Fisher Sr. The show's creator Alan Ball said this represents the living characters' internal dialogues expressed in the form of external conversations.

== Production ==
=== Concept ===
Although overall plots and characters were created by Alan Ball, reports conflict on how the series was conceived. In one instance, Ball stated that he came up with the premise of the show after the deaths of his sister and father. However, in an interview on the series' DVD collection, he intimated that HBO entertainment president Carolyn Strauss had proposed the idea to him. In a copyright infringement lawsuit, screenwriter Gwen O'Donnell asserted that she was the original source of the idea that later passed through Strauss to Ball; the U.S. Court of Appeals for the Ninth Circuit, proceeding on the assumption that this assertion was true, rejected her claim.

Airing on a premium cable network allowed the series to explore darker themes than would have been possible on other networks. Ball stated in an interview:

When I went to HBO and they had read my first draft and Carolyn Strauss said, "You know, this is really, really good. I love these characters, I love these situations, but it feels a little safe. Could you just make it just a little more fucked up?" which is not a note that you get in Hollywood very often. And I thought, "Wow!" And that gave me free range to go a little deeper, go a little darker, go a little more complicated.

=== Major themes ===
The show focuses on human mortality, the symbiotic nature of life and death feeding off each other, the death industry, and the lives of those who deal with it on a daily basis. When discussing the concept of the show, Ball elaborated on the foremost questions the show's pilot targeted:

Who are these people who are funeral directors that we hire to face death for us? What does that do to their own lives – to grow up in a home where there are dead bodies in the basement, to be a child and walk in on your father with a body lying on a table opened up and him working on it? What does that do to you?

Six Feet Under introduces the Fisher family as the basis on which to explore these questions. Throughout its five-season, 63-episode run, major characters experience crises that are in direct relation to their environment and the grief they have experienced. Ball again relates these experiences, as well as the choice of the series' title, to the persistent subtext of the program:

Six Feet Under refers not only to being buried as a dead body is buried, but [also] to primal emotions and feelings running under the surface. When one is surrounded by death – to counterbalance that, there needs to be a certain intensity of experience, of needing to escape. It's Nate with his womanizing – it's Claire and her sexual experimentation – it's Brenda's sexual compulsiveness – it's David having sex with a male hooker in public – it's Ruth having several affairs – it's the life force trying to push up through all of that suffering and grief and depression.

Cultural critic Sally Munt commented: "one might risk saying [the show] has an uncanny, or queer rendition of class positions and relations". New York magazine opined that the show "carefully avoided moralism" but there were times where it "felt like a message" that "death has a terrible timing" and it could also be a "karmic gift" for some. Ball refuted this claim by asserting that there was no message in the story but only a recognition that death comes in the middle of "messy things" and does not wait for people to sort out their lives.

=== Setting ===
Exteriors for the Fisher home were shot at 2302 West 25th Street and the intersection of Arlington Avenue, in the West Adams neighborhood of Los Angeles.

=== Crew ===
Creator Alan Ball also served as executive producer and showrunner for the entire series run. Robert Greenblatt and David Janollari executive produced the series, as the Greenblatt Janollari Studio was one of the production companies. The other producers were Lori Jo Nemhauser and Robert Del Valle.

The writing staff included Ball, who wrote nine episodes over the series run, including the pilot episode and the series finale. Writers who were on staff for the entire series run included Rick Cleveland, who wrote eight episodes and became an executive producer in the fifth season; Kate Robin, who wrote eight episodes and became a supervising producer in the fifth season; and Bruce Eric Kaplan, who wrote seven episodes and became an executive producer in the fourth season. Christian Williams was just on staff for the first season, writing two episodes. Both Laurence Andries and Christian Taylor wrote three episodes each during their run on the series for the first two seasons, and they also served as producers. Scott Buck and Joey Soloway joined in the second season, staying on staff for the rest of the series, and each wrote seven episodes. Buck became a co-executive producer in the fourth season, and Soloway became a co-executive producer in the fifth season. The last set of writers to join the staff were Craig Wright and Nancy Oliver in the third season. Wright wrote six episodes and became a producer in the fifth season and Oliver wrote five episodes and became a co-producer in the fifth season.

Ball also directed the most episodes, directing the pilot and each of the season finales. Dan Attias also directed six episodes, from seasons two to five. Kathy Bates (who also played Bettina on the series), Michael Cuesta, Rodrigo García, and Jeremy Podeswa each directed five episodes. Michael Engler, Daniel Minahan, and Alan Poul (who also served as an executive producer for the series) each directed four episodes. Miguel Arteta directed three episodes and Nicole Holofcener directed two episodes. Single-episode directors included Peter Care, Alan Caso, Lisa Cholodenko, Allen Coulter, Adam Davidson, Mary Harron, Joshua Marston, Jim McBride, Karen Moncrieff, John Patterson, Matt Shakman, Alan Taylor, Rose Troche, and Peter Webber.

=== Music ===
The series' main theme, written by composer Thomas Newman, won a 2002 Emmy Award for Outstanding Main Title Theme Music and two Grammy Awards in 2003 for Best Instrumental Composition and Best Instrumental Arrangement.

The production sound from seasons three through five was mixed by Bo Harwood, and was nominated in 2004 for a Cinema Audio Society Award.

Seasons two through five featured a promotional teaser trailer prior to the premiere of that season. The songs featured in each season's trailer were "Heaven" by Lamb for season two; "A Rush of Blood to the Head" by Coldplay for season three; "Feeling Good" by Nina Simone for season four; and "Breathe Me" by Sia for season five, which is also used for montage in the series finale. All these songs are included in either of two soundtracks for the show.

The episode recaps for the first two seasons feature the song "Nothing Lies Still Long" by Pell Mell. The episode previews for the first and fifth seasons feature the Six Feet Under title theme, while the other seasons feature the Rae & Christian remix version of the title theme.

Music supervision for the entire run of the series was provided by Gary Calamar and Thomas Golubić, who were also credited as producers for the two soundtrack albums.

== Cast and characters ==
=== Main ===
The main characters of Six Feet Under in the first season: From left to right: Federico, Keith, David, Claire, Ruth, Nate, Nathaniel Sr. and Brenda

- Peter Krause as Nate Fisher – the eldest child, who is in search of meaning while facing the prospect of his own death.
- Michael C. Hall as David Fisher – the middle child, who is uptight and coming to terms with being gay.
- Frances Conroy as Ruth Fisher – the family matriarch, who is emotionally repressed and trying to form a new, independent life.
- Lauren Ambrose as Claire Fisher – the youngest child, who is rebellious and creative.
- Freddy Rodriguez as Federico Diaz – a mortician and eventual business partner of the Fishers, who is a family man.
- Mathew St. Patrick as Keith Charles – David's on again/off again significant other, who is a member of the LAPD.
- Rachel Griffiths as Brenda Chenowith – Nate's on again/off again significant other, who struggles with depression.
- Jeremy Sisto as Billy Chenowith – Brenda's younger brother, who has bipolar disorder (main season 1; recurring seasons 2–5).
- James Cromwell as George Sibley – a geology professor, who becomes Ruth's second husband (recurring season 3; main seasons 4–5).
- Justina Machado as Vanessa Diaz – Federico's wife; she is a nurse (recurring seasons 1–4; main season 5).

=== Recurring ===
- Richard Jenkins as Nathaniel Fisher Sr. – the patriarch of the Fisher family, who dies at the start of the series, but appears in dream sequences and flashbacks (seasons 1–5)
- Joanna Cassidy as Margaret Chenowith – Brenda and Billy's psychologist mother (seasons 1–5)
- Giancarlo Rodriguez as Julio Diaz – Federico and Vanessa's son (seasons 1–5)
- Tim Maculan as Father Jack – priest at the Fisher's family church (seasons 1–5)
- Eric Balfour as Gabriel Dimas – Claire's high-school boyfriend and a chronic drug user (seasons 1–3)
- Robert Foxworth as Dr. Bernard Chenowith – Brenda and Billy's psychiatrist father (seasons 1–3)
- Ed O'Ross as Nikolai – Ruth's boss and boyfriend when she worked as a florist (seasons 1–2, 5)
- Marina Black as Parker McKenna – a friend of Claire's during high school (seasons 1–2)
- David Norona as Gary Deitman – Claire's counselor (seasons 1–2)
- Gary Hershberger as Matthew Gilardi – an employee of a major funeral home organization, who attempts to buy out Fisher & Sons (seasons 1–2)
- Ed Begley Jr., as Hiram Gunderson – a hair stylist with whom Ruth had an affair while she was married to Nathaniel (seasons 1 and 5)
- Illeana Douglas as Angela – Frederico's temporary replacement at Fisher & Sons (seasons 1 and 5)
- Dina Waters as Tracy Montrose Blair (season 1)
- Patricia Clarkson as Sarah O'Connor – Ruth's younger sister, an artist who lives in Topanga Canyon (seasons 2–5)
- Lili Taylor as Lisa Kimmel Fisher – Nate's former roommate, his first wife, and mother of his daughter Maya (seasons 2–5)
- Melissa Marsala as Angelica – Vanessa's sister, who has a contentious relationship with her brother-in-law Federico (seasons 2–5)
- Aysia Polk as Taylor Charles – Keith's niece, who is under his care (seasons 2–5)
- John Paul Pitoc as Phil – Claire's boyfriend (briefly) who works at the crematorium (seasons 2–3)
- Kellie Waymire as Melissa – a high-class prostitute whom Brenda befriends (season 2)
- Nicki Micheaux as Karla Charles – Keith's sister and Taylor's mother, a drug addict (season 2)
- Julie White as Mitzi Dalton-Huntley – an employee of a major funeral home organization that attempts to buy out Fisher & Sons (seasons 1–2)
- Kathy Bates as Bettina – Sarah's friend and caretaker; she becomes a good friend of Ruth's (seasons 3–5)
- Peter Macdissi as Olivier Castro-Staal – Claire's professor at art school and Margaret Chenowith's lover (seasons 3–5)
- Ben Foster as Russell Corwin – Claire's boyfriend during art school (seasons 3–5)
- Brenna Tosh and Bronwyn Tosh as Maya Fisher – Nate's and Lisa's young daughter (seasons 3–5)
- Rainn Wilson as Arthur Martin – a young intern from mortuary school, who works for the Fishers (seasons 3–5)
- Justin Theroux as Joe – Brenda's neighbor and boyfriend during season four (seasons 3–4)
- Idalis DeLeón as Sophia – an exotic dancer with whom Federico has an affair (seasons 3–4)
- Catherine O'Hara as Carol Ward – Lisa's boss, a neurotic motion-picture producer (seasons 3 and 5)
- Sprague Grayden as Anita Miller – Claire's friend from art school (seasons 4–5)
- Peter Facinelli as Jimmy – Claire's friend from art school and one-time lover (seasons 4–5)
- Mena Suvari as Edie – a free-spirited lesbian artist and friend of Claire's from art school (season 4)
- Michael Weston as Jake – a mentally unstable crack addict who kidnaps and assaults David (seasons 4–5)
- Tina Holmes as Maggie Sibley – George's daughter, who has a brief affair with Nate (seasons 4–5)
- Matt Malloy as Roger Pasquese – Keith's employer, a movie producer (seasons 4–5)
- Julie Dretzin as Barb – Lisa's sister (seasons 4–5)
- Jeff Yagher as Hoyt – Lisa's brother-in-law (season 4)
- Michelle Trachtenberg as Celeste – a spoiled pop star under Keith's protection (season 4)
- Bobby Cannavale as Javier – Keith's colleague (season 4)
- Chris Messina as Ted Fairwell – Claire's boyfriend, a lawyer at the firm where she worked (season 5)
- Kendré Berry as Durrell Charles-Fisher – an adopted son of David's and Keith's (season 5)
- C. J. Sanders as Anthony Charles-Fisher – an adopted son of David's and Keith's (season 5)
- Anne Ramsay as Jackie Feldman – Brenda's colleague and friend (season 5)

=== Family tree ===
Bernard Asa Chenowith	Margaret Chenowith	Nathaniel Fisher, Sr.^{†}	Ruth Fisher	George Sibley	Unnamed prior wife
Billy Chenowith	Brenda Chenowith	Nate Fisher	Lisa Kimmel Fisher	Claire Fisher	David Fisher	Keith Charles	Maggie Sibley	Brian Sibley
Willa Fisher Chenowith	Maya Kimmel Fisher	Anthony Charles-Fisher	Durrell Charles-Fisher

== Episodes ==
Season	Episodes	Originally released		Average viewers (in millions)
Season	Episodes	First released	Last released	Average viewers (in millions)
1	13	June 3, 2001	August 19, 2001	5.3
2	13	March 3, 2002	June 2, 2002	5.6
3	13	March 2, 2003	June 1, 2003	4.7
4	12	June 13, 2004	September 12, 2004	3.7
5	12	June 6, 2005	August 21, 2005	2.5

== Reception ==
=== Critical reception ===
Six Feet Under received widespread acclaim, particularly for its writing and acting. It is widely regarded as one of the greatest television series of all time, included on best-of lists by Time, The Guardian, and Empire. The show's finale has also been described as one of the greatest television series finales. The Writers Guild of America ranked it #18 on their list of the 101 Best Written TV Series.

Six Feet Under received critical acclaim for most of its run, with the exception of the fourth season, which received more mixed reviews. The first season holds a rating of 74 out of 100 at Metacritic based on 23 reviews. Early reviews of the series were positive, prior to the screening of the pilot episode; Steve Oxman of Variety stated, "Six Feet Under is a smart, brooding, fanciful character-driven ensemble piece about a family in the funeral biz." Following the series premiere, Barry Garron of The Hollywood Reporter commented that the series' "examination of family life through the prism of a mortuary business, combines sardonic humor with poignant drama and comes up with a unique tone and style, in itself quite an accomplishment for any TV series. It is fearless in its approach to storytelling and, far more often than not, succeeds in the risks it takes" and "there is much to admire about this series, including top-notch performances, artful direction and creative storytelling that employs various techniques, including dream sequences and parody commercials. Best of all, though, is Ball's introspection and the insight he provides about society, the funeral industry, and family relationships."

Bill Carter of The New York Times wrote, "Six Feet Under certainly got enthusiastic reviews, almost universally glowing notices about the rich characterizations and quirky humor shaped by the show's celebrated creator, Alan Ball, the Academy Award-winning writer of the film American Beauty." In an early response from HBO executive Chris Albrecht, he announced in regards to the viewers, that they are "totally thrilled with the series."

On Rotten Tomatoes, the first season has a 90% approval rating with an average score of 8/10 based on 40 reviews, with a critical consensus of, "Six Feet Under's unusual setting provides a perfect backdrop for the macabre meditations on mortality made by its brilliant, brooding cast." The second season has a 79% approval rating with an average score of 9.3/10 based on 14 reviews, with a critical consensus of, "Six Feet Under's deliberately paced second season is less endearing than the first, but the engaging ensemble remain reason enough to watch." The third season has a 90% approval rating with an average score of 7.6/10 based on 20 reviews, with a critical consensus of, "Six Feet Under's third season dials down the comedy in favor of creepier narratives – a challenge its cast is more than up to." The fourth season has a 50% approval rating with an average score of 5.6/10 based on 10 reviews, with a critical consensus of, "Six Feet Under overreaches in its fourth season, with twists and story arcs that feel more contrived than compelling, though its willingness to venture boldly into the dark also proves occasionally exhilarating." The fifth season has a 97% approval rating with an average score of 8.9/10 based on 35 reviews, with a critical consensus of, "Six Feet Under offers a fitting end for the Fishers by concluding the way it began: an unexpectedly beautiful rumination on life, death and grief."

The series finale is considered one of the greatest endings in television history. In a 2015 interview with Alan Ball, Peter Krause, Michael C. Hall, and Lauren Ambrose for The Hollywood Reporter, to mark ten years since the show's conclusion, they described it as the "finale that would not die". Megan Vick of The Hollywood Reporter said, "The idea of flashing forward to depict how each member of the Fishers and their loved ones would pass on seemed revolutionary in 2005, but Ball – who created the series and would write and direct its final episode – uses another word for it – inevitable."

=== Ratings ===
Season	Episodes	Premiered		Ended		Average Viewers (in millions)
Season	Episodes	Date	Viewers (in millions)	Date	Viewers (in millions)	Average Viewers (in millions)
1	13	June 3, 2001	4.97	August 19, 2001	7.06	5.3
2	13	March 3, 2002	6.24	June 2, 2002	5.49	5.6
3	13	March 2, 2003	5.09	June 1, 2003	5.78	4.7
4	12	June 13, 2004	4.20	September 12, 2004	3.73	3.7
5	12	June 6, 2005	2.62	August 21, 2005	3.89	2.5

=== Awards and nominations ===
At the 2002 Primetime Emmy Awards, the series received 23 nominations for its first two seasons, including a nomination for Outstanding Drama Series. Series creator Alan Ball won for Outstanding Directing for a Drama Series for the pilot episode and Patricia Clarkson won for Outstanding Guest Actress in a Drama Series. The rest of the ensemble cast, including Michael C. Hall, Peter Krause, Frances Conroy, Rachel Griffiths, Freddy Rodriguez, and Lauren Ambrose all received acting nominations. Guest actors Lili Taylor and Illeana Douglas received nominations in the guest-acting category. The series received 16 nominations at the 2003 Primetime Emmy Awards for its third season, including a nomination for Outstanding Drama Series. Krause, Conroy, Ambrose, Griffiths, James Cromwell, and Kathy Bates all received acting nominations. Alan Poul was nominated for directing for the episode "Nobody Sleeps", and Craig Wright was nominated for writing for the episode "Twilight". The series received five nominations at the 2005 Primetime Emmy Awards for its fourth season, including Outstanding Drama Series and Outstanding Lead Actress in a Drama Series for Frances Conroy. The series received nine nominations at the 2006 Primetime Emmy Awards for its fifth and final season. Patricia Clarkson won for the second time for Outstanding Guest Actress in a Drama Series, and Krause, Conroy, and Joanna Cassidy received acting nominations. Ball was nominated for writing and directing for the series finale episode "Everyone's Waiting".

For the Golden Globe Awards, the series won for Best Drama Series in 2001, and received nominations in 2002 and 2003. Peter Krause was nominated for Best Actor in a Drama Series in 2001 and 2002. Rachel Griffiths won for Best Supporting Actress in a Series, Miniseries, or TV Film in 2001, and received a nomination in 2002 in the Lead Actress category. Frances Conroy won for Best Actress in a Drama Series in 2003.

For the Screen Actors Guild Awards, the cast won for Outstanding Ensemble in a Drama Series in 2002 and 2003, and received nominations in 2001, 2004, and 2005. Peter Krause was nominated for Outstanding Male Actor in a Drama Series in 2001 and 2003. Frances Conroy won for Outstanding Female Actor in a Drama Series in 2003.

The series won a Peabody Award for general excellence in 2002 "for its unsettling yet powerfully humane explorations of life and death".

== Home media ==
=== DVDs ===
The first season was released in a VHS box set. All five seasons are available on DVD in individual box sets and in a collected volume.

Season	Release date			Additional information
Season	Region 1	Region 2	Region 4	Additional information
1	February 4, 2003	July 7, 2003	February 11, 2004	13 episodes; 4-disc set; Two audio commentaries; "Under the Main Title" featurette; "Behind-the-Scenes" featurette with cast and filmmaker; deleted scenes; cast and filmmaker bios; two music tracks
2	July 6, 2004	June 21, 2004	July 14, 2004	13 episodes; 5-disc set; Five audio commentaries; "Anatomy of a Working Stiff: Life as a Dead Body" featurette
3	May 17, 2005	April 4, 2005	May 11, 2005	Five audio commentaries; "A Birdseye View of the Third Season" – An in-depth interview with show creator Alan Ball including the original HBO trailer
4	August 23, 2005	September 5, 2005	November 16, 2005	12 episodes; 5-disc set; Seven audio commentaries; "Cut by Cut: Editing Six Feet Under" featurette; deleted scenes; Exclusive Bob Costas interview with the cast
5	March 28, 2006	April 10, 2006	October 4, 2006	12 episodes; 5-disc set; Six audio commentaries; "Six Feet Under: 2001–2005": two 30-minute retrospectives; "Life and Loss: The Impact of Six Feet Under" featurette
1–5	November 14, 2006	April 10, 2006	October 31, 2007	63 episodes; 24-disc set; Same special features as individual releases; Bonus disc 25 included on Region 1 (not available on regions 2 and 4); Re-released on Region 1 on October 6, 2009 in slimmer packaging; Re-released on Region 4 on August 13, 2014

=== Soundtracks ===
Two soundtrack albums, featuring music that had appeared in the series, were released:

- Six Feet Under (March 5, 2002)
- Six Feet Under, Vol. 2: Everything Ends (June 21, 2005)

=== Books ===
- Ball, Alan (2003). Alan Poul (ed.). Six Feet Under: Better Living Through Death. Simon and Schuster. ISBN 978-0-7434-8065-9.
- Akass, Kim; Janet McCabe; Mark Lawson (2005). Reading Six Feet Under: TV To Die For. I. B. Tauris. ISBN 978-1-85043-809-0.

=== Streaming ===
The complete series is available from various streaming sites including HBO Max, Amazon Video, Disney+ Hotstar. In July 2023, it was announced that the series would be added to Netflix in the United States as part of a co-exclusive deal between Netflix and Warner Bros. Discovery.

== See also ==
- Family Plots – a reality TV series about a Poway, California-based funeral home
- List of Primetime Emmy Awards received by HBO
