= Sean Durkin =

Canadian film director (born 1981)

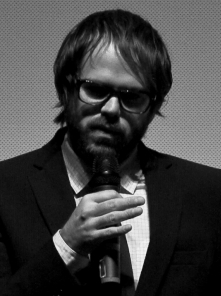
- Durkin at the 2011 Toronto International Film Festival
- Born: Timothy Sean Durkin; December 9, 1981 (age 44); Canada
- Other name: T. Sean Durkin
- Occupations: Film director; screenwriter; film producer
- Years active: 2006–present

Timothy Sean Durkin (born December 9, 1981) is a Canadian-American film director, screenwriter, and producer. Durkin is known for directing the critically acclaimed independent films Martha Marcy May Marlene (2011), The Nest (2020), and The Iron Claw (2023). He is also known for directing episodes of the Channel 4 series Southcliffe (2013) and the Amazon Prime Video miniseries Dead Ringers (2023).

== Early life and education ==
Durkin was born in Canada and moved to England soon thereafter; he was raised in North London and in Surrey until his family moved to Manhattan when he was 12. Durkin graduated from Kent School in Kent, Connecticut in 2000, then attended the film school at New York University, where he graduated in 2005 and delivered his thesis film in 2006. He moved to Williamsburg, Brooklyn in 2008.

== Career ==
In an interview with Robert K. Elder for the book The Best Film You've Never Seen, Durkin said, “When I make a film, I think about things that scare me. My exploration of those things is to try and wrap my head around them and confront them.” Durkin is a founding member of Borderline Films with fellow directors Antonio Campos and Josh Mond. Durkin started his career directing several short films starting with Doris in 2006. His short film, Mary Last Seen won the award for best short film at the 2010 Cannes Film Festival Directors' Fortnight. Durkin adapted the short into his first feature length film, the psychological-thriller Martha Marcy May Marlene (2011) which was starred Elizabeth Olsen, John Hawkes, and Sarah Paulson. The film revolves around a woman suffering from paranoia after returning to her family from an abusive cult in the Catskill Mountains. The film premiered at the 2011 Sundance Film Festival where he won the Dramatic Directing Award. The film received positive reviews with Christy Lemire of the Associated Press naming it the best film of 2011.

In 2013, Durkin directed the Channel 4 drama series Southcliffe, starring Sean Harris and Rory Kinnear. His second film, another psychological drama, The Nest (2020) starred Carrie Coon and Jude Law. The film follows a couple whose marriage dissolves once they move from New York to London. Film critic Richard Lawson of Vanity Fair declared the film the best film of the year. The film received six British Independent Film Award nominations including three awards Durkin for Best Director, Best Screenplay and Best British Independent Film. Durkin then directed his third film the A24 drama The Iron Claw (2023), starring Zac Efron, Jeremy Allen White, Harris Dickinson, and Lily James. The film is a biography based on the Von Erich family of wrestlers.

== Favorite films ==
Durkin participated in the 2012 Sight & Sound Directors' Poll, which is held once every 10 years for contemporary filmmakers to select their 10 favourite films in no particular order, his selections were:

- 3 Women (USA, 1977)
- The Birds (USA, 1963)
- The Conformist (Italy, 1970)
- The Goonies (USA, 1985)
- Jaws (USA, 1975)
- The Panic in Needle Park (USA, 1971)
- Persona (Sweden, 1966)
- The Piano Teacher (France, 2001)
- Rosemary's Baby (USA, 1968)
- The Shining (USA, 1980)

== Filmography ==
=== Short films ===
Year	Title	Director	Writer	Producer
2006	Doris	Yes	No	No
2007	The Last 15	No	No	Yes
2008	A Long Way Home	No	No	Yes
2010	Mary Last Seen	Yes	Yes	No
2010	Kids in Love	No	No	Yes
2013	Karaoke!	No	No	Yes
2013	1009	No	No	Executive
2014	Tzniut	No	No	Executive

=== Films ===
Year	Title	Director	Writer	Producer
2011	Martha Marcy May Marlene	Yes	Yes	No
2020	The Nest	Yes	Yes	Yes
2023	The Iron Claw	Yes	Yes	Yes
2027	Deep Cuts	Yes	Yes	Yes

Executive producer

- Two Gates of Sleep (2010)
- The Eyes of My Mother (2016)
- Christine (2016)
- Katie Says Goodbye (2016)
- Piercing (2018)
- The Rental (2020)

Producer

- Afterschool (2008)
- Simon Killer (2012)
- James White (2015)

=== Television ===
Year	Title	Director	Executive Producer	Notes
2013	Southcliffe	Yes	No	Miniseries
2023	Dead Ringers	Yes	Yes	3 episodes

=== Music videos ===
- "Air Traffic Control" by Louis XIV (2008)
- "Your Love Is Killing Me" by Sharon Van Etten (2014)

== Awards and nominations ==
Year	Award	Category	Title	Result
2014	BAFTA TV Award	Best Mini-Series	Southcliffe	Nominated
2021	British Independent Film Award	Best British Independent Film	The Nest	Nominated
2021	British Independent Film Award	Best Director	The Nest	Nominated
2021	British Independent Film Award	Best Screenplay	The Nest	Nominated
2010	Cannes Film Festival	SFR Prize	Mary Last Seen	Won
2011	Cannes Film Festival	Un Certain Regard	Martha Marcy May Marlene	Nominated
2008	Independent Spirit Awards	Best First Feature	Afterschool	Nominated
2011	Independent Spirit Awards	Best First Feature	Martha Marcy May Marlene	Nominated
2015	Independent Spirit Awards	Best First Feature	James White	Nominated
2010	Sundance Film Festival	Short Filmmaking Award	Mary Last Seen	Nominated
2011	Sundance Film Festival	Grand Jury Prize	Martha Marcy May Marlene	Nominated
2011	Sundance Film Festival	Directing Award	Martha Marcy May Marlene	Won
