= C. J. Sanders =

American football player and actor (born 1996)

Profile
- Position: Wide receiver

Personal information
- Born: September 18, 1996 (age 30); Granada Hills, California, U.S.
- Listed height: 5 ft 9 in (1.75 m)
- Listed weight: 180 lb (82 kg)

Career information
- High school: Notre Dame (Sherman Oaks, California)
- College: Notre Dame (2015–2017); SMU (2018–2019)

Awards and highlights
- Second-team All-AAC (2019)
- Stats at ESPN

Christoper McCall "C. J." Sanders (born September 18, 1996) is an American former college football wide receiver and child actor. Sanders has had acting roles in several Hollywood movies and television shows.

== High school ==
Sanders attended Brentwood Academy in Brentwood, Tennessee for his first three seasons. After moving to California with his family, he transferred to Notre Dame High School, Sherman Oaks, California for his senior year. Sanders had 35 catches for 562 yards and eight touchdowns. He also carried the ball 41 times for 437 yards and nine touchdowns. On special teams, he scored an additional four touchdowns, including two on kickoffs and two on punts.

Considered a four-star recruit by Rivals.com, he was rated as the 37th best wide receiver prospect of his class. He accepted a scholarship offer and committed to play college football at the University of Notre Dame.

College recruiting
Name	Hometown	School	Height	Weight	40^{‡}	Commit date
C. J. Sanders; WR	Granada Hills, California	Notre Dame High School	5 ft 9 in (1.75 m)	177 lb (80 kg)	4.32	May 6, 2014
C. J. Sanders; WR	Recruit ratings: Scout: Rivals: (80)					
Overall recruit ranking: Scout: 39 (WR), 8 (CA), 9 (regional), 268 (national) Rivals: 37 (WR) ESPN: 42 (CA)
Note: In many cases, Scout, Rivals, 247Sports, On3, and ESPN may conflict in their listings of height and weight.; In these cases, the average was taken. ESPN grades are on a 100-point scale.; Sources: "Notre Dame Football Commitment List". Rivals.; "Notre Dame College Football Recruiting Commits". Scout.; "ESPN". ESPN.; "Scout.com Team Recruiting Rankings". Scout.; "2015 Team Ranking". Rivals.com.

== Acting career ==
Sanders was an American child actor whose notable roles include the movie Ray, where he played a young Ray Charles, and the television show Six Feet Under, where he played Anthony Charles-Fisher in a number of episodes. He also appeared in the movie First Sunday as Ice Cube's son Durell Jr.

He was nominated for several awards for his performance in Ray, including a Black Reel Award, an NAACP Image Award, an OFTA Award, and a Young Artist Awards. He also guest starred in a few television shows, such as Judging Amy, Cold Case, Grey's Anatomy and Saved.

== College career ==
=== Freshman ===
A standout in summer practices, Sanders was named the starting punt returner for Notre Dame and later took over kick return duties as well.

Sanders emerged as a standout in his special teams role. Against UMass, Sanders returned a punt 50 yards for a touchdown in just his fourth collegiate game. Later in the season, Sanders returned a kickoff 93 yards for a touchdown against Stanford.

== Personal ==
C.J.'s father is former NFL wide receiver Chris Sanders. His step-father, Corey Harris, is former safety who played 12 seasons in the NFL. CJ Sanders mom Stacie McCall Harris was a point guard at the University of Michigan.

C.J. has his own non-profit organization, CJ's Gift Foundation, whose mission is to "promote self-esteem and self-worth among disadvantaged and at risk youth and their parents" and "to purposefully seek-out and reach-out to families who have been forgotten, overlooked and left out of opportunities that produce positive change and inspire hope."
