= Towelhead (film) =

2007 film

- Theatrical release poster
- Directed by: Alan Ball
- Screenplay by: Alan Ball
- Based on: Towelhead by Alicia Erian
- Produced by: Ted Hope; Alan Ball
- Starring: Aaron Eckhart; Toni Collette; Maria Bello; Peter Macdissi; Summer Bishil
- Cinematography: Newton Thomas Sigel
- Edited by: Andy Keir
- Music by: Thomas Newman
- Production companies: Indian Paintbrush; This is that; Your Face Goes Here Entertainment
- Distributed by: Warner Independent Pictures; Red Envelope Entertainment
- Release dates: September 8, 2007 (Toronto International Film Festival); September 26, 2008 (US)
- Running time: 124 minutes
- Country: United States
- Languages: English; French; Arabic; Spanish
- Box office: $675,662

Towelhead (alternatively titled Nothing Is Private) is a 2007 American drama film written and directed by Alan Ball and based on Alicia Erian's novel of the same name. The film made its world premiere at the Toronto International Film Festival on September 8, 2007, under the name Nothing Is Private. The motion picture, like the book, touches on issues of coming-of-age, sexual awakening, privacy, and race.

== Plot ==
In 1990 amid the Kuwait War of 1990–1991, 13-year-old Jasira, a Lebanese-American girl, lives with her mother in Syracuse, New York. When her mother's live-in boyfriend helps Jasira shave her pubic hair, her mother sends Jasira to live with her old-fashioned and domineering Lebanese father Rifat in suburban Houston, Texas. Jasira's father is extremely strict; he does not allow her to use tampons, and prefers spending time with his new girlfriend Thena. Even her mother refuses to support her when she calls and begs for help, forcing Jasira to comply with his rules.

Jasira experiences a sexual awakening, sparked in part by adult magazines she finds when baby-sitting her next-door neighbor Zack Vuoso. While Jasira is home alone one night, Zack's father Travis comes over to retrieve one of his magazines and sexually assaults her. Jasira befriends a classmate, Thomas Bradley, eventually becoming sexually active with him. When Rifat finds out about her relationship with Thomas, he forbids her from ever seeing him, only because he is black.

Mr. Vuoso becomes jealous of Jasira's relationship with Thomas, and, pretending he has to go to Iraq the next morning, tricks Jasira into sleeping with him. When Rifat finds one of Mr. Vuoso's adult magazines at his house, he beats Jasira, and she seeks refuge at the home of pregnant Melina and her husband, Gil, neighbors who were aware of and concerned about Mr. Vuoso's inappropriate behavior towards Jasira from the beginning. While staying at their house, Gil notices bruises on Jasira's legs and Rifat angrily knocks on the door wanting to retrieve his daughter. When both Melina and Gil refuse to let Rifat in, he threatens to call the police and claim that they kidnapped his daughter, but Gil responds to Rifat that he will tell them about the bruises he left on Jasira. She goes to school the next day and Melina picks her up, along with Thomas. When they make it back home, they decide to have sex, but are almost caught by Melina.

Later, Rifat visits the couple along with Thena. He notices Thomas is in the house and angrily confronts him. He also reveals why he despises him. He then decides to check the house and discovers a condom in the trash. He assumes Thomas is responsible for taking his daughter's virginity and attempts to assault him. This forces Jasira to confess that she had sex with Mr. Vuoso, who is then arrested and bailed out the next day.

Thomas talks with Jasira about her abuse from Mr. Vuoso, and explains that he does not want to have sex with her anymore. She says she does not want to stop. One day after school, Jasira retrieves the corpse of Travis' cat, which ran off after she came by his house and was accidentally run over by Rifat on his way home. When Melina sees Jasira talking to Mr. Vuoso, she runs outside to stop the conversation, but trips and falls down on the ground, which causes her to bleed and go into labor. While at the hospital, Rifat is asked by Jasira to accompany Melina in the delivery room, since her husband will not make it in time. When Rifat refuses to stay, he finally decides to trust Jasira and let her stay and live with Melina, which makes her very happy. He leaves the delivery room and Jasira witnesses Melina giving birth to a baby girl.

== Cast ==
- Summer Bishil as Jasira Maroun
- Aaron Eckhart as Travis Vuoso
- Toni Collette as Melina
- Maria Bello as Gail Monahan
- Peter Macdissi as Rifat Maroun
- Matt Letscher as Gil Hines
- Eugene Jones as Thomas Bradley
- Chase Ellison as Zack Vuoso
- Carrie Preston as Evelyn Vuoso
- Lynn Collins as Thena
- Chris Messina as Barry
- Shari Headley as Mrs. Bradley
- Irina Voronina as "Snow Queen" Centerfold
- Randy Goodwin as Mr. Bradley

== Critical reception ==
Towelhead received mixed reviews from critics; Rotten Tomatoes reports that 49% of critics have given the film a positive review based on 114 reviews, with an average rating of 5.36/10. The consensus reads, "This story of politics, race and sexual awakening has moments that pack a punch, but overall, Towelhead never quite achieves the nuance of helmer Alan Ball's television work." The film also holds a score of 57 out of 100 on Metacritic based on 32 reviews.
