= Peter Macdissi =

Lebanese actor and producer

- Born: May 14, 1974 (age 50); Beirut, Lebanon
- Occupation(s): Actor, executive producer
- Years active: 1993–present
- Partner: Alan Ball

Peter Macdissi (Arabic: بيتر مقدسي; born May 14, 1974) is a Lebanese actor and producer. His filmography consists mostly of television work, most notably playing recurring character Olivier Castro-Staal on Alan Ball's HBO series Six Feet Under. In 2007, he appeared in Towelhead, a feature film written and directed by Ball, who is also his partner. Along with Ball, he is one of the executive producers of the Cinemax series Banshee.

== Filmography ==
Year	Film	Role	Other notes
1993	The Making of '...And God Spoke'	Jordan Sales Rep	
1998	JAG	Corporal Tanzer	TV series
1999	Three Kings	Iraqi Republican Guard Lieutenant - Oasis Bunker	
2000	The X-Files	Prison Guard	TV series
2001	The Agency	Syrian Guard	TV series
2002	Bad Company	Dragan Henchman #3	
2003	Six Feet Under	Olivier Castro-Staal	TV series
2003	Tiptoes	Adrissi	
2004	Line of Fire	Dale Westmore	TV series
2005	24	Omar's Henchman	TV series
2007	Towelhead	Rifat	
2010	Burning Palms	Gerry	
2010	The Losers	Vikram	Movie
2011	True Blood	Luis Patino	TV series
2018	Here and Now	Dr. Farid Shokrani	TV series
2020	Uncle Frank	Wally	
2022	Ramy		TV Series
