= Alan Ball (screenwriter) =

American screenwriter (born 1957)

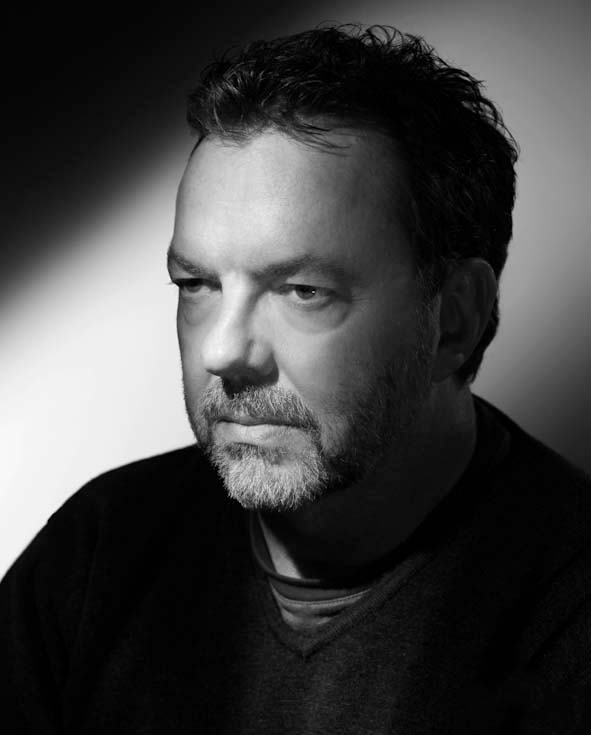
- Ball in 2008
- Born: Alan Erwin Ball; May 13, 1957 (age 69); Marietta, Georgia, U.S.
- Education: University of Georgia Florida State University
- Occupations: Screenwriter, director, producer
- Known for: Screenwriter of American Beauty
- Television: Six Feet Under; True Blood; Banshee
- Partner: Peter Macdissi
- Awards: Academy Award for Best Original Screenplay; American Beauty (1999)

Alan Erwin Ball (born May 13, 1957) is an American writer and director for film and television. Ball is best known for writing the screenplay for the dramedy film American Beauty (1999), for which he won the Academy Award for Best Original Screenplay at the 72nd Academy Awards ceremony. He also created the HBO drama series Six Feet Under (2001–2005) and True Blood (2008–2014), and served as an executive producer on the Cinemax action drama series Banshee (2013–2016). He wrote and directed the films Towelhead (2007) and Uncle Frank (2020).

== Early life ==
Ball was born in Marietta, Georgia to Frank and Mary Ball, both of whom were aircraft inspectors. His older sister, Mary Ann, was killed in a car accident when Ball was 13; he was in the passenger seat at the time. He attended Marietta High School in Marietta, Georgia and went to college at the University of Georgia and Florida State University. Ball graduated from Florida State in 1980 with a degree in theater arts.

After college, Ball began work as a playwright at the General Nonsense Theater Company in Sarasota, Florida.

== Career ==
Ball broke into television as a writer and story editor on the sitcoms Grace Under Fire and Cybill.

Ball wrote two film scripts that ended up in development hell prior to American Beauty (1999). He won the Academy Award for Best Original Screenplay for American Beauty. He has written two further films: Towelhead (2007) and Uncle Frank (2020), the latter of which he also produced and directed. He is also the creator, writer and executive producer of the HBO drama series Six Feet Under and True Blood. Ball was the showrunner for True Blood for its first five seasons.

In 2010, Ball began work on a television adaptation of the crime noir novel The Mystic Arts of Erasing All Signs of Death by Charlie Huston, to be titled All Signs of Death. In December 2010, after several months of pre-production, HBO cancelled production.

Ball was one of the executive producers of the Cinemax series Banshee.

In July 2016, it was announced that Ball's family drama Here and Now had been ordered to series by HBO. Starring Tim Robbins and Holly Hunter, the show was cancelled in April 2018 after one ten-episode season.

== Personal life ==
Ball has discussed his Buddhist faith in numerous interviews, noting how it has influenced his filmmaking. In an interview with Amazon.com, Ball commented on the plastic bag scene in American Beauty, stating: "I had an encounter with a plastic bag! And I didn't have a video camera, like Ricky does... There's a Buddhist notion of the miraculous within the mundane, and I think we certainly live in a culture that encourages us not to look for that." Ball also discussed how his Buddhism shaped themes in Six Feet Under and True Blood.

Ball is gay and has been called "a strong voice for [the] LGBT community". In 2008, he made Out magazine's annual list of the 100 most impressive gay men and women.

== Accolades ==
For his work in television and film, Ball has received critical acclaim and numerous awards and nominations, including an Academy Award, an Emmy a Golden Globe, and awards from the Writers, Directors, and Producers Guilds.

Awards

for American Beauty

- 2000 Academy Award for Best Original Screenplay
- 2000 Golden Globe Award for Best Screenplay
- 2000 Writers Guild of America Award for Best Original Screenplay

for Six Feet Under

- 2002 Directors Guild of America Award for Outstanding Directorial Achievement in a Drama Series
- 2002 Emmy Award for Outstanding Directing in a Drama Series
- 2004 Producers Guild of America Award for Dramatic Series

Nominations

for American Beauty

- 2000 BAFTA Film Award for Best Original Screenplay

for Six Feet Under

- 2002 Directors Guild of America Award for Outstanding Directorial Achievement
- 2004 Directors Guild of America Award for Outstanding Directorial Achievement
- 2006 Emmy Award for Outstanding Directing in a Drama Series
- 2006 Emmy Award for Outstanding Writing in a Drama Series
- 2006 Writers Guild of America Award for Best Dramatic Series

for True Blood

- 2009 Writers Guild of America Award for Best New Series
- 2010 Producers Guild of America Award for Dramatic Series

== Works ==
=== Television ===
Grace Under Fire
Title	Year	Credit	Notes
"The Road to Paris, Texas"	1994	Teleplay; Story, with Brett Butler	
"Grace vs. Wade"	1994	Writer	
"A Night at the Opera"	1995	Writer	
"Memphis Bound"	1995	Writer, with Marc Flanagan	

Cybill
Title	Year	Credit	Notes
"Zing!"	1995	Teleplay, with Lee Aronsohn	
"To Sir, with Lust"	1996	Writer	
"Three Women and a Dummy"	1996	Writer	
"Venice or Bust"	1996	Writer	
"Buffalo Gals"	1996	Writer	
"Name That Tune"	1997	Teleplay, with Michael Langworthy	
"Mother's Day"	1997	Story	
"Regarding Henry"	1997	Story	Season 4 premiere
"Halloween"	1997	Teleplay, with Mark Hudis	
"Where's a Harpoon When You Need One?"	1997	Teleplay, with Kim Friese	
"Bakersfield"	1998	Story	
"Oh Brother!"	1998	Teleplay, with Mark Hudis	
"Dream Date"	1998	Story	

Oh, Grow Up
Title	Year	Credit	Notes
"Pilot"	1999	Writer	Series premiere
"Good Pop, Bad Pop"	1999	Writer	

Six Feet Under
Title	Year	Credit	Notes
"Pilot"	2001	Writer; Director	Series premiere
"An Open Book"	2001	Writer	
"Knock Knock"	2001	Writer; Director	Season 1 finale
"In The Game"	2002	Writer	Season 2 premiere
"Someone Else's Eyes"	2002	Writer	
"The Last Time"	2002	Director	Season 2 finale
"Perfect Circles"	2003	Writer	Season 3 premiere
"Nobody Sleeps"	2003	Writer, with Rick Cleveland	
"I'm Sorry, I'm Lost"	2003	Director	Season 3 finale
"Can I Come Up Now?"	2004	Writer	
"Untitled"	2004	Director	Season 4 finale
"Everyone's Waiting"	2005	Writer; Director	Series finale

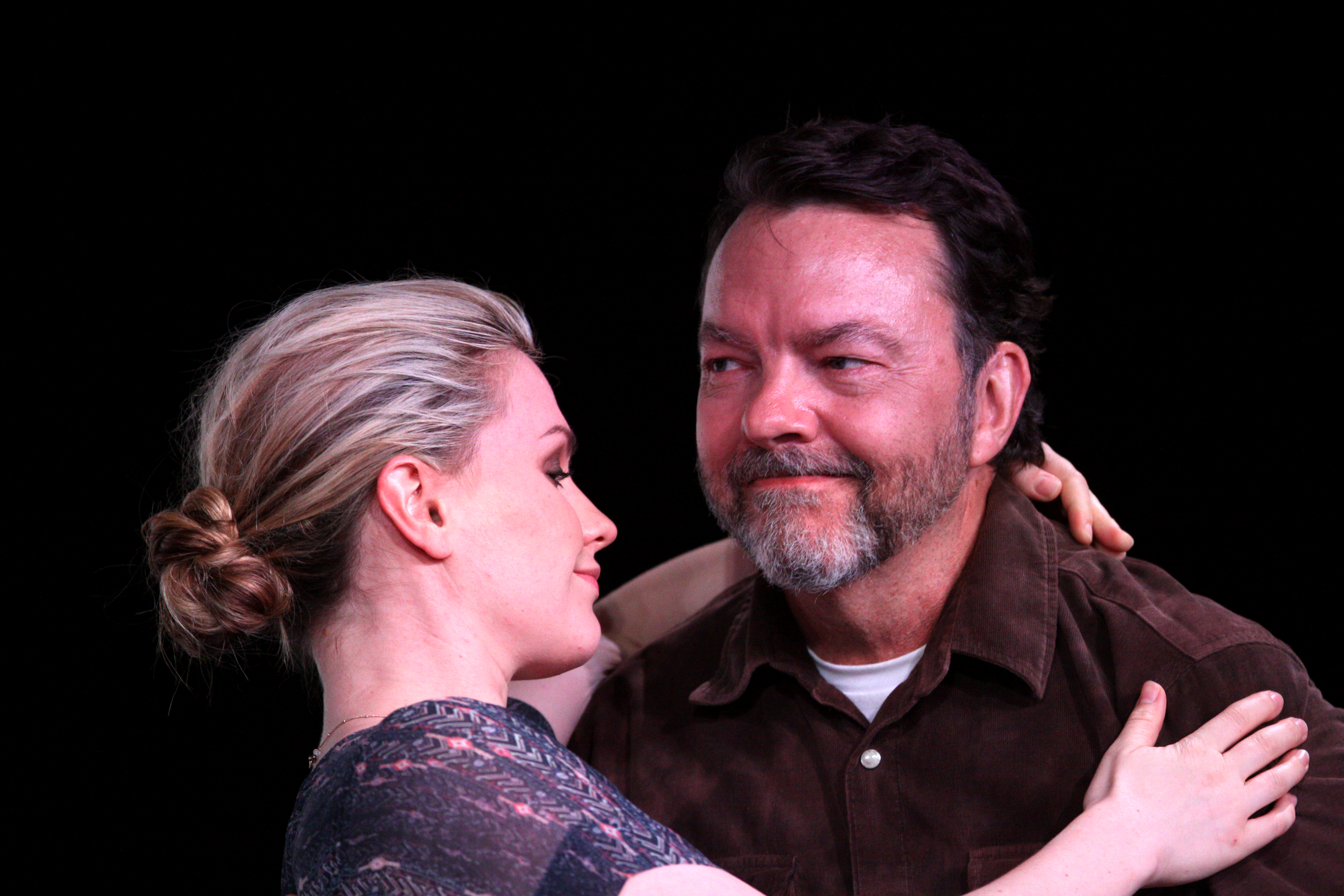
Ball with True Blood star Anna Paquin in July 2012

True Blood
Title	Year	Credit	Notes
"Strange Love"	2008	Writer; Director	Series premiere
"The First Taste"	2008	Writer	
"Mine"	2008	Writer	
"You'll Be the Death of Me"	2008	Director	Season 1 finale
"Shake and Fingerpop"	2009	Writer	
"Frenzy"	2009	Writer	
"I Got a Right to Sing the Blues"	2010	Writer	
"Evil is Going On"	2010	Writer	Season 3 finale
"If You Love Me, Why Am I Dyin'?"	2011	Writer	
"Spellbound"	2011	Writer	
"Hopeless"	2012	Writer	
"Save Yourself"	2012	Writer	Season 5 finale

Here and Now
Title	Year	Credit	Notes
"Eleven Eleven"	2018	Writer; Director	Series premiere
"It's Coming"	2018	Writer	
"It's Here"	2018	Writer	

=== Film ===
Title	Year	Credit	Notes
American Beauty	1999	Writer; Co-producer	
Towelhead	2007	Screenwriter; Director	
The Immortal Life of Henrietta Lacks	2017	Executive producer	Television film
Uncle Frank	2020	Screenwriter; Director	

=== Theatre ===
Title	Year	Credit	Notes
Five Women Wearing the Same Dress	1993	Playwright	
All That I Will Ever Be	2007	Author	
