= Richard Raymond (filmmaker) =

British filmmaker

- Born: London, England, United Kingdom
- Occupations: Film director; Writer; Producer
- Works: Heartless; Souls of Totality; A Million Eyes; Desert Dancer

Richard Raymond is a British film director. He is known for films such as Heartless, Souls of Totality, A Million Eyes and Desert Dancer.

== Early life and education ==
Richard Raymond was born in London, England, into a Jewish Indian family. He loved films from a young age, and started making his own short films aged 15.

== Career ==
Raymond started his career as an assistant at Pinewood Film Studios, working under directors including Kenneth Branagh, Richard Attenborough, and Neil Jordan. He also worked on British television commercials for directors such as Tarsem, Daniel Barber, Tony Kaye, and Jonathan Glazer.

Raymond started his career in 2009 by producing Heartless, a British feature film starring Jim Sturgess, Eddie Marsan, and Timothy Spall.

In 2015, he made his directorial debut with Desert Dancer, starring Freida Pinto. The film was distributed by Relativity Media and opened the Santa Barbara Film Festival. It also screened Lincoln Center, the US Capitol, the United Nations, and the Edinburgh International Film Festival, where it received the Audience Award. Desert Dancer was also nominated for the Golden Frog film award at Camerimage and won Best Dance Choreography at the Fred and Adele Astaire Awards.

In 2018 Raymond made Souls of Totality with actress Tatiana Maslany, where he filmed a single-take sequence during an actual solar eclipse. The film premiered at the 2018 HollyShorts Film Festival & won 12 Best Film awards, including Best Film of the Festival at Raindance Film Festival, the Grand Jury Award at HollyShorts Film Festival, and the Grand Prix at the Hiroshima International Film Festival. Richard won a Best Director award at the Edinburgh International Film Festival for this film and was also short-listed for an Oscar.

He directed the short film A Million Eyes in 2019, featuring Joe Morton and Katie Lowes. A Million Eyes won 10 Best Film awards, including the Grand Prix award at the Hiroshima International Film Festival and the and a Special Jury Award at HollyShorts Film Festival, and was long-listed for the 2020 Oscars.

In May 2019, a film directed by Raymond titled One Thousand Paper Cranes was announced to begin production, with Evan Rachel Wood playing Eleanor Coerr, who wrote the 1977 book Sadako and the Thousand Paper Cranes about the story of Sadako Sasaki, a victim of the Hiroshima bombing in 1945.

== Filmography ==
Year	Title	Writer	Director	Producer	Ref.
2009	Heartless			Yes	
2015	Desert Dancer		Yes	Yes	
2018	Souls of Totality		Yes	Yes	
2019	A Million Eyes		Yes	Yes	
2026	Heart of the Beast			Yes	

== Awards ==
Year	Title	Category	Awards	Result	Ref.
2018	Souls of Totality	Best Director	Edinburgh International Film Festival	Won	
2018	Souls of Totality	BestShort of the Festival	Raindance Film Festival	Won	
2018	Souls of Totality	Best Grand Jury Prize	HollyShorts Film Festival	Won	
2018	Souls of Totality	Best Short of the Festival	St. Louis International Film Festival	Won	
2018	Souls of Totality	Grand Prix Best Film Award	Hiroshima Film Festival	Won	
2018	Souls of Totality	Best Film of the Festival	New Renaissance Film Festival	Won	
2018	Souls of Totality	Most Popular Film	Rhode Island International Film Festival	Won	
2018	Souls of Totality	Special Mention	Edinburgh International Film Festival	Won	
2018	Souls of Totality	Maverick Spirit Award	Cinequest Film Festival	Won	
2018	Souls of Totality	Special Jury Award for Best Cinematography	Bend Film Festival	Won	
2018	Souls of Totality	Best Film Audience Award	El Festival Americana	Won	
2018	Souls of Totality	Best Northern Film	Klamath Independent Film Festival	Won	
2018	Souls of Totality	Best Actress Tatiana Maslany	Love Story Film Festival	Won	
2018	Souls of Totality	Best Actor Tom Cullen	Love Story Film Festival	Won	
2019	A Million Eyes	Grand Prix Best Film Award	Hiroshima Film Festival	Won	
2019	A Million Eyes	Best Film of the Festival	ME Film Festival	Won	
2019	A Million Eyes	Best Short of the Festival	New Renaissance Film Festival	Won	
2019	A Million Eyes	Best Film of the Festival	Dam short International Film Festival	Won	
2019	A Million Eyes	Special Jury Recognition	HollyShorts Film Festival	Won	
2019	A Million Eyes	Best Short Film	Gold Movie Awards London	Won	
2019	A Million Eyes	Best Cinematography	New Renaissance Film Festival	Won	
2019	A Million Eyes	Best Young Actor	New Renaissance Film Festival	Won	
2019	A Million Eyes	Best Film Jury Prize	Providence Children's Film Festival	Won	
