= Freida Pinto =

Indian actress (born 1984)

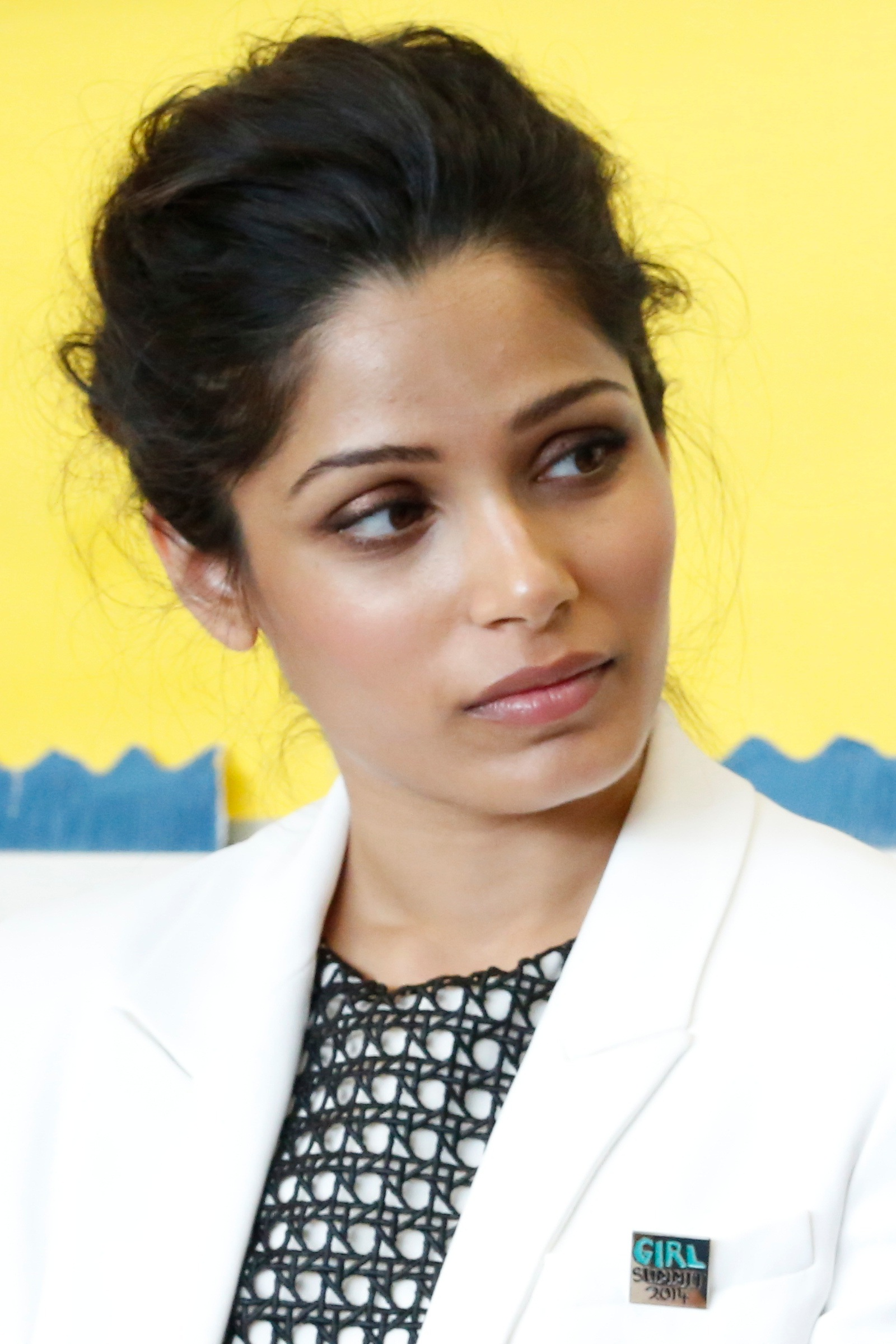
- Pinto in 2014
- Born: Freida Selena Pinto; 18 October 1984 (age 42); Bombay, Maharashtra, India (now Mumbai, Maharashtra, India)
- Education: St. Xavier's College, Mumbai
- Occupation: Actress
- Years active: 2005–present
- Spouse: Cory Tran (m. 2020)
- Partner: Dev Patel (2009–2014)
- Children: 1

Freida Selena Pinto (born 18 October 1984) is an Indian actress who has appeared mainly in American and British films. Born and raised in Mumbai, Maharashtra, she resolved at a young age to become an actress. As a student at St. Xavier's College, Mumbai she took part in amateur plays. After graduation, she briefly worked as a model and then as a television presenter.

Pinto rose to prominence with her film debut in the drama Slumdog Millionaire (2008), winning a SAG Award and earning a nomination for the BAFTA Award for Best Supporting Actress. She subsequently starred in Miral (2010), Trishna (2011), and Desert Dancer (2014). She also saw commercial success with the science fiction film Rise of the Planet of the Apes (2011), and the epic fantasy action film Immortals (2011). Pinto's other notable roles include You Will Meet a Tall Dark Stranger (2010), Love Sonia (2018), Hillbilly Elegy (2020), and Mr. Malcolm's List (2022). She also starred in the Showtime miniseries Guerrilla (2017), and had a recurring role in the Hulu series The Path (2018).

Along with her film career, she promotes humanitarian causes.

== Early life and background ==
Pinto was born on 18 October 1984 in Bombay, Maharashtra to Konkani Mangalorean Catholic parents from Mangalore, Karnataka. (Note: Pinto on her Portuguese surname to Interview: "I come from Mangalore, which is in the southern part of India, where you have a big Catholic population. Some of them were forced into conversions by the British and Portuguese. So I may not necessarily have that kind of lineage. I could pretty much be a Hindu from India.") Her mother, Sylvia Pinto, was the principal of St. John's Universal School in Goregaon, West Mumbai, and her father, Frederick Pinto, was a senior branch manager for the Bank of Baroda in Bandra, West Mumbai.

Pinto had a middle class upbringing in the suburb of Malad, North Mumbai. She first wanted to be an actress when she was five years old, often dressing up and imitating television actors during her childhood. She later recalled being inspired by Sushmita Sen's victory in the 1994 Miss Universe competition, explaining that "the country was really proud of her, and I was like, one day, I want to do the same". Pinto attended the Carmel of St. Joseph School in Malad, North Mumbai and then studied at St. Xavier's College, Mumbai in Fort, South Mumbai. Her major was in English literature, with minors in psychology and economics. At college, she participated in amateur theatre, but declined acting and modeling assignments until her graduation in 2005.

Despite her interest in acting from an early age, Pinto was undecided on what career to take until watching Monster (2003) while at college. She stated: "I guess it was when I watched Monster... I pretty much knew. I had to find a way. I had to do something like that, something completely transformational." In 2005, Pinto began a modeling career and joined Elite Model Management India, with whom she worked for two and a half years. She was featured in several television and print advertisements for products such as Wrigley's Chewing Gum, Škoda, Vodafone India, Airtel, Visa, eBay, and De Beers.

Around the same time, Pinto began going to auditions for films and television shows. She was chosen to host Full Circle, an international travel show that aired on Zee International Asia Pacific between 2006 and 2008. The show took her to countries all over the world, including Afghanistan, Fiji, Malaysia, Singapore, and Thailand. Her auditions for both Bollywood and Hollywood productions, including Shimit Amin's Bollywood sports film Chak De! India (2007), and for the role of Bond girl Camille Montes in Marc Forster's Quantum of Solace (2008), were largely unsuccessful. Pinto later claimed that it was a good learning experience, stating that she was "glad things happened the way they happened. I needed to be rejected, and I needed to learn that it's part of the game... I can have 100 rejections, but I'm sure there's going to be one particular thing that is almost destined for me to have."

== Acting career ==
=== 2008–2010: Beginnings and breakthrough ===
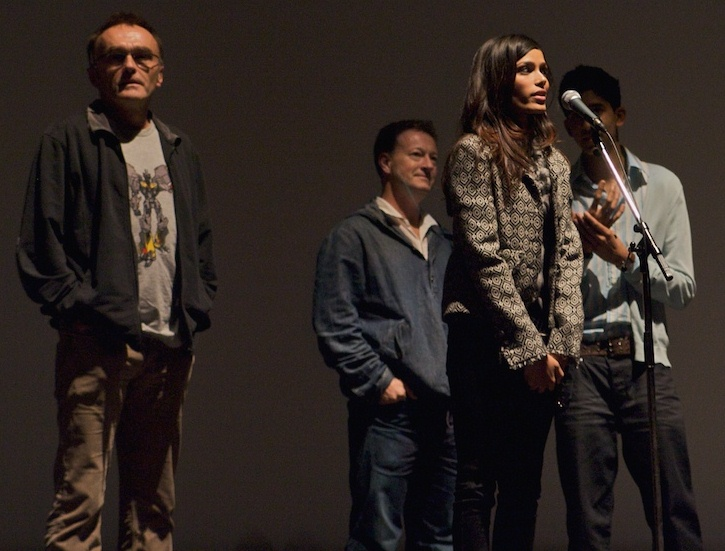
Pinto with the crew of Slumdog Millionaire during its screening at the 2008 Toronto International Film Festival

In 2007, Pinto's modeling agency selected her and six other models to audition for the female lead in Danny Boyle's film Slumdog Millionaire (2008) after a request by its casting director. After undergoing six months of extensive auditions, Pinto won the role of Latika, the love interest of the main character Jamal, played by Dev Patel. During the post-production phase, she attended an acting course at the Barry John Acting Studio in Mumbai. Although the course taught her about the "technical aspects" of acting, she stated that "in terms of the actual experience, there's nothing like going out there and actually playing the part... So for me, my favorite acting school was the six months of auditioning with Danny Boyle". Pinto won the Breakthrough Performance Award at the Palm Springs International Film Festival, and the Screen Actors Guild Award for Outstanding Performance by a Cast in a Motion Picture, along with other cast members from the film. She was also nominated for Best Actress in a Supporting Role at the BAFTA Awards. Pinto's performance in the film drew little attention from critics as her screen presence in the film was limited. The Telegraph (Calcutta) opined "it's difficult to form an opinion" on her character; its columnist Bharathi S. Pradhan noted "Slumdog Millionaire wasn't really a test of Freida's acting abilities."

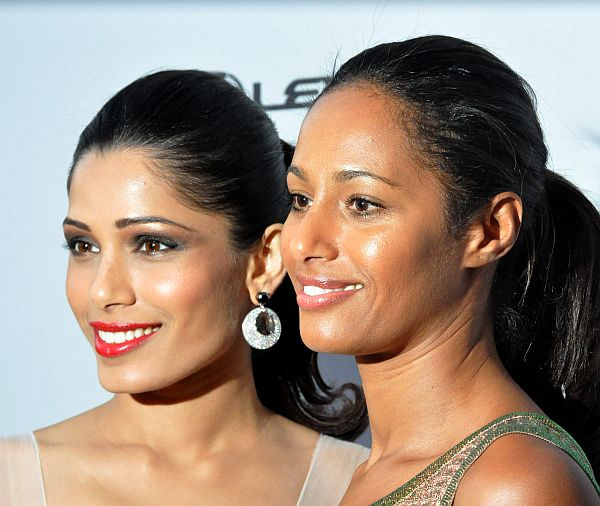
Pinto (left) and Rula Jebreal attend the screening of Miral at the 18th Annual Hamptons International Film Festival in October 2010

Following the success of Slumdog Millionaire, Pinto signed up for two art house productions. In Woody Allen's comedy-drama You Will Meet a Tall Dark Stranger (2010), she acted alongside Antonio Banderas, Josh Brolin, Anthony Hopkins, Anupam Kher, and Naomi Watts. She played a "mystery woman" who draws the attention of the character played by Brolin. Pinto then starred in Julian Schnabel's Miral (2010), based on a semi-biographical novel by Rula Jebreal, playing an orphaned Palestinian woman who grew up in a refugee camp in Israel. Before the film's production began in the Palestinian territories, Pinto prepared for the role by visiting several refugee camps in the area. She stated that she could relate to her character's experiences because of her knowledge about her relatives' experiences during the partition of India in the 1940s. The film received largely negative reviews, and Pinto's performance divided critics: Geoffrey Macnab of The Independent wrote that "Miral ... is played very engagingly by Freida Pinto", while Peter Bradshaw of The Guardian stated that "[Pinto] looks uneasy and miscast".

=== 2011–2018 ===
Pinto had four releases in 2011. The first was the science fiction film Rise of the Planet of the Apes, a reboot of the Planet of the Apes series. She played the role of Caroline Aranha, a primatologist who falls in love with the main character, played by James Franco. To prepare for her role, she researched the career of English anthropologist Jane Goodall. The film went on to gross US$481.8 million worldwide; it remains her highest-grossing film as of April 2016. Pinto's character received criticism for being too one-dimensional: Anthony Quinn of The Independent called it a "failure", and Todd McCarthy of The Hollywood Reporter described the character as the most "boringly decorous tag-along girlfriend seen onscreen in years". Pinto's second screen appearance of the year was playing the title character in Michael Winterbottom's Trishna. The film, based on Thomas Hardy's novel Tess of the d'Urbervilles, gave Pinto the role of a teenage Rajasthani peasant, who leaves her family to work for a British-born Indian hotelier, played by Riz Ahmed. Nishat Bari of India Today called Pinto's role her "most substantial" one to that point. Philip French of The Guardian stated that Pinto "captivates" in the lead role, while Roger Ebert of the Chicago Sun-Times called her performance "touchingly beautiful". In contrast, Manohla Dargis of The New York Times wrote that Pinto is "one of [the film's] loveliest attractions, but she and her director haven't been able to give Trishna a pulse".

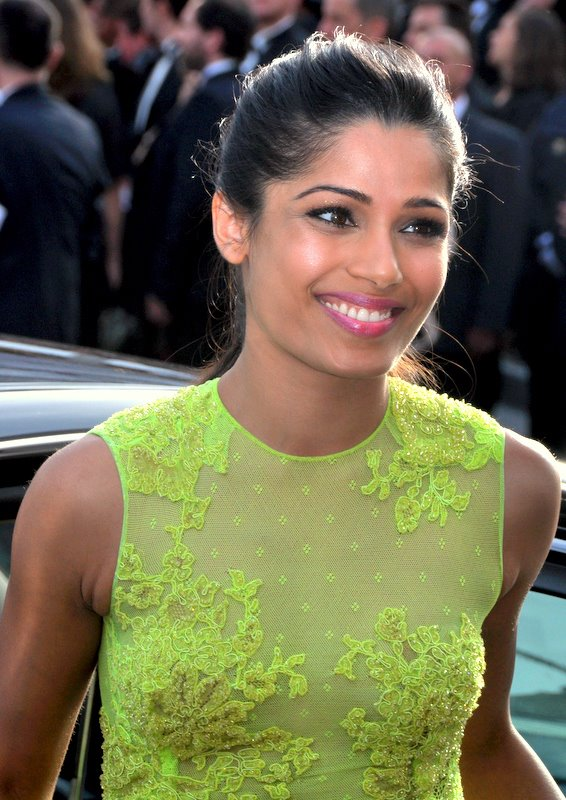
Pinto at the 2012 Cannes Film Festival

Pinto's third film role in 2011 was playing Princess Lailah in the poorly received independent film Day of the Falcon, (Note: Day of the Falcon is also known as Black Gold and Or noir.) a period drama set in the 1930s Middle East, where she was cast alongside Antonio Banderas, Mark Strong and Liya Kebede. Despite overall negative reviews, Andy Webster of The New York Times described Pinto and Kebede as "refreshing" and praised their "independent presences amid the stiflingly male-dominated milieu". Pinto's final screen appearance of the year was in the fantasy-action film Immortals, in which she played the oracle priestess Phaedra. Writing for The Hollywood Reporter, Todd McCarthy remarked that Phaedra was "capably embodied" by Pinto.

After 2011, Pinto had no new film releases for two years. In 2013, she appeared in the music video for Bruno Mars' single "Gorilla". She was criticised by the Indian media for appearing in the video; The Times of India and Hindustan Times dismissed it as little more than "dirty dancing". In the same year, Pinto was also one of the narrators in the documentary film Girl Rising, produced for the campaign of the same name which promotes access to education for girls all over the world.

Pinto's first cinematic appearance in two years was in the biographical drama Desert Dancer (2014), which was about the life of Iranian choreographer Afshin Ghaffarian. She played the heroin-addicted Elaheh, the love interest of the lead character played by Reece Ritchie. The role required her to do dance training consisting of eight hours of rehearsals a day for 14 weeks. She also attended a few sessions at rehabilitation centres in the United States to prepare for her role. It received largely negative reviews, although Andy Webster of The New York Times noted that "Pinto, even with an unfocused and underwritten role, is captivating".

Pinto's first film of 2015 was Terrence Malick's Knight of Cups, which featured an ensemble cast including Christian Bale, Cate Blanchett, Natalie Portman, and Antonio Banderas. She played Helen, a model with whom Bale embarks on a "dalliance". She talked about acting without a script: "It is definitely a bit nerve-racking on the first day because you don't know where you are going to go. But once you figure that out, then it doesn't really matter. It is actually very relaxing. It is fun and liberating. It is an experience that I completely embrace". She was among the 100 narrators of Unity (2015), a documentary that explores the relationships between Earth's species. Her third release of that year was the Colombian action film Blunt Force Trauma, in which she starred opposite Ryan Kwanten and Mickey Rourke as a woman looking for her brother's murderer. In 2015, Pinto worked on Andy Serkis' Mowgli: Legend of the Jungle, a motion capture adventure fantasy film based on Rudyard Kipling's The Jungle Book. She portrays Mowgli's adoptive mother, Messua, in the film.

=== 2019–present ===
In November 2020 Netflix released the film Hillbilly Elegy in which Pinto played the role of Usha Chilukuri Vance, wife of Vice President JD Vance. In January 2021, it was announced that Pinto was to play the lead in a biopic of the SOE agent Noor Inayat Khan, based on the book Spy Princess: The Life of Noor Inayat Khan by Shrabani Basu. More recently, she and her Freebird Films company inked a first look TV deal at Entertainment One.

== Charity work ==
Pinto has been actively involved with several humanitarian causes, and is vocal about the uplifting of women and underprivileged children. She has cited Angelina Jolie and Malala Yousafzai as "massive" inspirations in this regard. In 2010, Pinto joined Andre Agassi and Steffi Graf in support of their philanthropic organisation, the Agassi Foundation. She raised $75,000 for their annual fund raiser — "The 15th Grand Slam for Children"—which was aimed at providing education for underprivileged children. Two years later, she was appointed as the global ambassador of Plan International's Because I am a Girl, a campaign that promotes gender equality with the aim of lifting millions of girls out of poverty.

In 2013, Pinto appeared in a video clip for Gucci's "Chime for Change" campaign to raise funds and awareness of women's issues in terms of education, health, and justice.

The following year, she participated at the "Girls' rights summit" in London, where she called for more progress toward the end of female genital mutilation and child marriage. In March 2015, she spoke out against the Indian government's ban on India's Daughter, Leslee Udwin's documentary on the 2012 Delhi gang rape. During its premiere at the United States, she said the film needs to reach the public as it is not a "shame-India documentary". In a 2015 interview, she stated: "This film in no way is propagating violence in order to solve the problem. In fact, what we're saying is let's do this in the most civilized possible way ever".

In February 2016, Pinto announced that she would be a part of a nonprofit organisation called "We Do It Together", which provides financing for feature films, documentaries, and television shows that focus on women's empowerment.

== Media image ==
Although she played a small role in Slumdog Millionaire, the film catapulted Pinto to widespread recognition. The media has often speculated about her roles and earnings. In March 2009, The Daily Telegraph reported Pinto as the highest-paid Indian actress, although she had not appeared in a Bollywood film to that point. CNN-IBN called her "India's best export to [the] West", while The Telegraph (Calcutta) described her as "arguably the biggest global star from India".

Pinto has been frequently included in beauty and fashion polls conducted by various magazines. She was featured in People magazine's annual lists of "World's Most Beautiful People" and "World's Best Dressed Women" in 2009. That year, she was also included in Vogue's list of the "top ten most stylish women". In 2011, Pinto was included as the only Indian celebrity among the "50 Most Beautiful Women in Film", a list compiled by Los Angeles Times Magazine. The following year, People named her one of the "Most Beautiful at Every Age". She was featured in the "Top 99 Most Desirable Women" poll conducted by AskMen, consecutively from 2010 to 2012.

In 2009, Pinto was made a spokeswoman for L'Oréal Paris. Two years later, a controversy arose when she appeared in an advert promoting a L'Oréal product; it showed Pinto in what was perceived to be a lighter skin tone due to make-up or editing. The company denied claims of retouching Pinto's picture.

A popular actress in Hollywood, Pinto remains a relatively little-known figure in India; critics and analysts have attributed the fact to the failure of Slumdog Millionaire in the country. Indian sociologist Ashis Nandy remarked, "My periscope does not pick her up", while journalist Khalid Mohamed stated, "She is not a factor in Mumbai." The Indian media has criticised her "fluctuating" accents, in Hindi and English, and attributed her inability to find roles in Bollywood to her dark complexion. Despite these comments, Pinto has been credited by the media for having avoided being stereotyped as an Indian in Hollywood, as she often plays characters of other nationalities. In a 2012 interview with Hindustan Times, she said she consciously avoids roles that depict stereotypes.

Pinto balances out her career by working in "big budget Hollywood blockbusters" alongside "smart independent films." When asked about her preference for Hollywood, she replied: "I just wanted to become an actor. As an actor, you don't have to limit yourself to a particular culture or ethnicity. I want to spread my tentacles everywhere and am ready for a film offer from any part of the world."

== Personal life ==
Before beginning her film career, Pinto was engaged to Rohan Antao, who had been her publicist at one point. She ended the relationship in January 2009 and began dating her Slumdog Millionaire co-star Dev Patel. After a six-year relationship, the couple separated amicably in December 2014.

Pinto became engaged to photographer Cory Tran in November 2019, and they married in 2020 at the Honda Center. She gave birth to their son in November 2021.

After the success of Slumdog Millionaire, Pinto had split her time between Mumbai, London, and Los Angeles, and as of 2015 she lives in Los Angeles.

== Filmography ==
=== Film ===
Key
†	Denotes upcoming films

Year	Title	Role	Notes
2008	Slumdog Millionaire	Latika	
2010	You Will Meet a Tall Dark Stranger	Dia	
2010	Miral	Miral	
2011	Rise of the Planet of the Apes	Caroline Aranha	
2011	Trishna	Trishna	
2011	Day of the Falcon	Princess Leyla	
2011	Immortals	Phaedra	
2013	Girl Rising	Narrator	Documentary
2014	Desert Dancer	Elaheh	
2015	Knight of Cups	Helen	
2015	Unity	Narrator	Documentary
2015	Blunt Force Trauma	Colt	
2015	Black Knight Decoded	Ahna	Short film
2016	Two Bellmen Two	Leila Patel	Short film
2016	Past Forward	Woman #2	Short film
2017	Yamasong: March of the Hollows	Geta	Voiceover; Animated film
2018	Love Sonia	Rashmi	
2018	Mowgli: Legend of the Jungle	Messua	
2019	Only	Eva	
2020	Love Wedding Repeat	Amanda	
2020	Hillbilly Elegy	Usha Vance	
2021	Intrusion	Meera	
2021	Needle in a Timestack	Alex Leslie	
2022	Mr. Malcolm's List	Selina Dalton	
2023	My Mother's Wedding	Jack	
2026	Avatar Aang: The Last Airbender	Avatar Sonam (voice)	

=== Television ===
Year	Show	Role	Channel	Note
2006	Full Circle	Host	Zee International Asia Pacific	Talk Show
2015	India: Nature's Wonderland	Herself	BBC Two	Nature documentary
2017	Guerrilla	Jas Mitra	Showtime / Sky Atlantic	Lead role; miniseries
2018	The Path	Vera	Hulu	Recurring role
2020–2022	Mira, Royal Detective	Queen Shanti	Disney Channel	Voiceover; Main cast
2021	Spy Princess	Noor Inayat Khan	TBA	Title role
2025	Surface	Grace	Apple TV+	Season 2

=== Music video appearances ===
Year	Song	Performer	Album
2013	"Gorilla"	Bruno Mars	Unorthodox Jukebox

== Awards and nominations ==
Year	Award	Category	Work	Outcome	Ref.
2009	BAFTA Awards	Best Supporting Actress	Slumdog Millionaire	Nominated	
2009	Black Reel Awards	Best Ensemble	Slumdog Millionaire	Nominated	
2009	Central Ohio Film Critics Association	Best Ensemble	Slumdog Millionaire	Nominated	
2009	MTV Movie Awards	Best Breakthrough Performance	Slumdog Millionaire	Nominated	
2009	MTV Movie Awards	Best Kiss (shared nomination with Dev Patel)	Slumdog Millionaire	Nominated	
2009	Palm Springs International Film Festival	Breakthrough Performance Award	Slumdog Millionaire	Won	
2009	Screen Actors Guild Award	Outstanding Performance by a Cast in a Motion Picture	Slumdog Millionaire	Won	
2009	Teen Choice Awards	Choice Movie Actress: Drama	Slumdog Millionaire	Nominated	
2009	Teen Choice Awards	Choice Movie Fresh Face Female	Slumdog Millionaire	Nominated	
2009	Teen Choice Awards	Choice Movie Liplock (Shared with Dev Patel)	Slumdog Millionaire	Nominated	
2018	Indian Film Festival of Melbourne	Best Supporting Actress	Love Sonia	Nominated	
2018	Indian Film Festival of Melbourne	IFFM Diversity in Cinema Award	—N/a	Won	
