= Best Pancakes in the County =

- Theatrical release poster
- Directed by: Ken Sanzel
- Written by: Ken Sanzel
- Produced by: Raja Collins; Eduard Osipov; Eric Brenner; Niko Fomenko; R. Wesley Sierk III
- Starring: Nicolas Cage; Justin Long; Shelley Hennig; Ravi Patel
- Cinematography: Pascal Combes-Knoke
- Edited by: Magnus Häll; Håkan Karlsson
- Music by: Carl-Johan Sevedag
- Production companies: Beno Films; Caliwood Pictures
- Distributed by: Independent Film Company
- Release date: November 20, 2026
- Running time: 91 minutes
- Country: United States
- Language: English

Best Pancakes in the County is a 2026 American action thriller film written and directed by Ken Sanzel. It stars Nicolas Cage, Justin Long, Shelley Hennig, and Ravi Patel.

The film received a simultaneous release across theatres and digital platforms in the United States on November 20, 2026, by Independent Film Company.

== Premise ==
Over the course of one night, a small-town diner becomes the center of a standoff involving rogue federal agents, a con man, and a waitress who is more involved than she appears.

== Cast ==
- Nicolas Cage as S.O.B
- Justin Long as Cookie
- Shelley Hennig as Dolly
- Ravi Patel as Ryder
- Brandon Mychal Smith as Agent Otto
- Lauren German as Agent Margot
- Kelly Greyson as Blondie
- Jaylen Moore as French
- Michael Sirow as Agent Kincaid

== Production ==
In January 2026, it was reported Ken Sanzel was writing and directing action thriller Best Pancakes in the County with Nicolas Cage, Justin Long, and Shelley Hennig set to star.

Sanzel had previously directed Cage in Kill Chain.

Filming took place in Arkansas.

== Release ==
Fortitude International presented the film to potential distributors at the European Film Market in February 2026. In June 2026, it was announced that RLJE Films had acquired US distribution rights. In October 2026, distribution rights were transferred to RLJE's sister company Independent Film Company, which then gave the film a simultaneous release on November 20, 2026.

== Reception ==
On review aggregator Rotten Tomatoes, the film holds a 23% approval rating based on 13 reviews, with an average rating of 5.1/10.
