= Kate Trefry =

American screenwriter

Kate Trefry is an American screenwriter, producer, and director. She is best known as a writer and co-executive producer on the Netflix television series Stranger Things, and as the writer of the stage play Stranger Things: The First Shadow.

== Early life and education ==
Trefry grew up in Anchorage, Alaska. She later moved to New York City, where she studied English at New York University.

== Career ==
Trefry began her career as a screenwriter with original film projects. Two of her unproduced feature screenplays, Pure O and Revolver, were included on the annual Black List of notable unproduced screenplays in Hollywood.

She joined the writing staff of the Netflix science-fiction series Stranger Things during its second season and later became a co-executive producer on the series, for which she was nominated as a producer for the 2022 Primetime Emmy Award for Outstanding Drama Series.

In addition to her work on television, Trefry co-wrote the screenplay for the horror film Fear Street Part Three: 1666 (2021), part of Netflix's Fear Street film trilogy.

Trefry also wrote and directed short films. Her short film How to Be Alone (2019) premiered at South by Southwest. She also co-wrote the short film Souls of Totality (2018).

In 2023, Trefry wrote Stranger Things: The First Shadow, a theatrical prequel to the television series. The stage play premiered in London’s West End and was developed in collaboration with the creators of Stranger Things. For her play, she was nominated for a Laurence Olivier Award, WhatsOnStage Award, Outer Critics Circle Award and Drama League Award.

== Filmography ==
=== Film ===
- Souls of Totality (2018) – co-writer
- How to Be Alone (2019) – writer and director
- Fear Street Part Three: 1666 (2021) – co-writer

=== Television ===
- Stranger Things (2017–2025) – writer; co-executive producer
- Something Very Bad Is Going to Happen (2026) – co-writer
- Other Worlds: A Stranger Things Adventure (2028) - co-creator, writer, showwrunner, executive producer

=== Theatre ===
- Stranger Things: The First Shadow (2023) – writer

== Awards and nominations ==
Year	Award	Category	Work	Result	Ref.
2022	Primetime Emmy Award	Outstanding Drama Series	Stranger Things	Nominated	
2024	Laurence Olivier Award	Best Entertainment or Comedy Play	Stranger Things: The First Shadow	Nominated	
2024	WhatsOnStage Awards	Best New Play	Stranger Things: The First Shadow	Nominated	
2025	Drama League Award	Drama League Award for Outstanding Production of a Play	Stranger Things: The First Shadow	Nominated	
2025	Outer Critics Circle Award	Outstanding New Broadway Play	Stranger Things: The First Shadow	Nominated	
