= Kill Chain (film) =

2019 film by Ken Sanzel

- Film poster
- Directed by: Ken Sanzel
- Written by: Ken Sanzel
- Produced by: Lisa M. Hansen; Paul Hertzberg; Gary Preisler
- Starring: Nicolas Cage
- Cinematography: Manuel Castañeda
- Edited by: Alexander Kopit
- Music by: Mario Grigorov
- Production companies: Millennium Media; CineTel Films; ETA Films; Saturn Films
- Distributed by: Amazon Studios
- Release date: October 18, 2019 (United States)
- Running time: 91 minutes
- Country: United States
- Language: English

Kill Chain is a 2019 American neo-noir crime thriller film written and directed by Ken Sanzel. The film stars Nicolas Cage, Enrico Colantoni, Anabelle Acosta, Angie Cepeda, Eddie Martinez, Alimi Ballard, and Ryan Kwanten.

Kill Chain was released in the United States through video on demand on October 18, 2019, by Amazon Studios.

== Plot ==
Two men, both assassins, enter a hotel, and speak to the manager Araña (Cage). They take away his shotgun and revolver from the front lobby, and talk about pursuing him for a while now.

An old sniper is on the lookout with his rifle from a high storey window of a building. He calls his daughter on the phone, and although she wants to see him, he avoids her because of his profession as a killer. He calls a streetwalker to his room and has her visit a "Sanchez" on the roof of the building across from him. When she arrives there, the two snipers exchange gunshots and the old sniper is severely injured, when he receives a phone call saying that he was hired to be the target, not the killer.

Sanchez assumes that his work is done, and is told to collect his payment hidden in an abandoned car parked on the street. As soon as he takes the diamonds from the car, two armed cops, Miguel and Lance suddenly arrive on the scene, handcuff Sanchez and seize the diamonds. As Sanchez is transported in the back of the police vehicle, he offers money to one of the cops to kill the other and free him. But Lance kills Sanchez since he spoke in Spanish to Miguel, a language that Lance cannot understand. Miguel is angry that they have to dispose of a body, and is killed in a shootout with Lance.

Lance goes to a hideout to see a woman ("Woman in Red") and talks about them acquiring a new passport and new identities. Unexpectedly, gun shots are heard outside and a gang wants Lance and the Woman in Red to surrender themselves. Lance fights the gang and asks The Woman in Red to run away. She leaves the place and hijacks a milk truck and orders the milkman to drive to the hotel. At the front desk, she asks Araña for a room with a view of the street for one night. Making light chat with each other, Araña tells her that he is the clerk, bartender, security guard and owner of the hotel. The Woman in Red guesses from Araña's scars that he is a violent man. She goes to her room followed by Araña and they share an intimate moment. He hears the hotel bell ring, and he asks her to hide.

Ringing the hotel bell repeatedly is a man, Oso along with a woman ("Very Bad Woman"), enquiring about the lady who rented a room there. Araña takes the Very Bad Woman to the room with the Woman in Red. The Very Bad Woman demands that the Woman in Red return her stolen cash and jewelry, but the two women fight, and the Woman in Red stabs the Very Bad Woman to death. Downstairs, Araña shares a drink with Oso, who finds his hands trembling, when Araña opens his fist to reveal the pills used to poison Oso's drink. Oso falls on the table dead.

The movie returns to the first scene, when two assassins appear at the hotel desk. One of the men threatens Araña with a shotgun. Araña says the "Organization" discovered him and Franco doing "PMC" (Private Military Contractor) work, and were displeased with it. The Organization demanded Franco and Araña to take control of a certain shipment, which the men were shocked to discover was a shipment of underaged girls. They kept the money and set girls free, except for one that Franco raised as his own daughter. But the freed girls were killed by Sanchez, while the Old sniper watched without intervening. Franco's daughter was captured by Miguel and Lance, who tortured and killed her. Franco went after the cops with a gun, but was killed by the Very Bad Woman. That's the reason Araña has been at the hotel for a year - to hatch a plot to take revenge on those who killed his buddy Franco and his adopted daughter. A shootout occurs, resulting in both the assassins being killed. Araña gives the Woman in Red money and diamonds.

Araña goes to the hotel room and finds the Old Sniper dying and says that even though he didn't kill those girls, he didn't stop Sanchez from doing so, and in that sense was guilty of murder. The Old Sniper gives Araña a phone and requests to have his daughter taken care of. Araña shoots The Old Sniper dead and walks out of the building, calling the daughter on the phone.

== Cast ==
- Nicolas Cage as Araña
- Anabelle Acosta as The Woman In Red
- Enrico Colantoni as The Old Sniper
- Ryan Kwanten as Lance Ericson
- Angie Cepeda as The Very Bad Woman
- Eddie Martinez as Sanchez
- Jhon Bedoya as Miguel Garcia
- Alimi Ballard as The Curious Assassin
- Pedro Calvo as The Mean Assassin
- Yusuf Tangarife as Oso
- Luna Baxter as Gigi
- Jon Mack as Gigi's Friend
- Juan Andres Angulo as Delivery Boy
- Hector Alexander Gomez as Franco
- Eileen Jimenez as Franco's Daughter (9)
- Sara Elizabeth Avila as Franco's Daughter (17)

== Production ==
In May 2018, it was reported that Ken Sanzel would write and direct Kill Chain, an action-thriller for Millennium Films starring Nicolas Cage.

Sanzel said the impetus for Kill Chain came about after finishing Blunt Force Trauma in Colombia, with Sanzel's producer Gary Preisler suggesting they return to work on another film within the country utilizing their knowledge acquired during the production of Blunt Force Trauma.

Sanzel was inspired by the Raymond Chandler short story I'll Be Waiting with its hotel setting and build-up to a violent structure informing which would have three intertwining stories centering on Cage's character Araña, Enrico Colantoni's Sniper, and a third story which proved challenging for Sanzel in finding a direction he liked. Taking inspiration from the Richard Linklater film Slacker, Sanzel restructured the story so that the killer in one story becoming the victim in the next which cleared the way for Sanzel to write the plotline for Ryan Kwanten's Ericson.

Kill Chain was shot over the course of 20 days in Bogotá.

Initially, the film was structured so that Cage's character would not appear until the back half of the film, but the producers were concerned about him not appearing at the beginning and the film was restructured for a frame story in the beginning that would have an appearance of Cage in the opening.

== Reception ==
Chester C. Jones of Collider graded the film a D.
