= Ken Sanzel =

American film director, producer, and writer

- Born: 1964 or 1965
- Occupations: director, screenwriter, producer
- Years active: 1997–present

Ken Sanzel is an American film and television director, producer, writer, and former law enforcement officer. Sanzel spent a decade as an officer of the New York City Transit Police Department before becoming a screenwriter in the 1990s.

== Career ==
Ken Sanzel worked as an officer of the New York City Transit Police Department for ten years. In 1990, Sanzel and his plainclothes partner encountered a pair of armed muggers on the IRT Subway train in Brooklyn attacking a couple with a baby. A shootout ensued in which one of the muggers fled while the other suffered a non-lethal gunshot wound and was quickly arrested. Sanzel took a shot in his left shoulder which left a bullet fragment embedded in his body. As a result of his actions Sanzel was awarded the New York City Police Department Combat Cross and Distinguished Duty Medal.

Sanzel began writing screenplays in the early 1990s in his off hours from his job. Sanzel managed to achieve success thanks to a childhood friend who became a film executive, which led to Savoy Pictures buying three of his screenplays and hiring him to write a fourth. Sanzel left his role as a detective for the Transit Police Department not long thereafter.

As Sanzel had a relationship with CBS, regularly selling them pilots, then chairperson Nina Tassler asked him to come on board the first season of Numb3rs to help improve the police dialogue. Sanzel began regularly collaborating with creators Nicolas Falacci and Cheryl Heuton, which led to his becoming a regular contributor on the series, writing and directing a few episodes.

Following his work on Numb3rs, Sanzel was hired by CBS to serve as showrunner and executive producer for the first season of Blue Bloods. By August 2010, it was reported that Sanzel had exited Blue Bloods as showrunner due to creative differences with star Tom Selleck, with Sanzel favoring more compelling procedural storylines while Selleck favored softer character focused material.

In April 2012, it was reported Sanzel had signed an overall deal with Universal Television.

== Filmography ==
Film

Year	Title	Director	Writer
1998	The Replacement Killers	No	Yes
1998	Scar City	Yes	Yes
2002	Lone Hero	Yes	Yes
2015	Blunt Force Trauma	Yes	Yes
2019	Kill Chain	Yes	Yes
2026	Best Pancakes in the County	Yes	Yes

Television

Year	Title	Creator	Writer	Executive producer	Notes
1997	Lawless	Yes	No	No	Wrote and produced the original pilot which went unused after Frank Lupo became showrunner.
1999	Dodge's City	Yes	Yes	No	Also director, Unsold Pilot for MTV/UPN
2005	Jonny Zero	Yes	No	No	
2005	Numb3rs	No	Yes	No	Also consulting producer, 104 episodes
2010	Blue Bloods	No	Yes	Yes	Also showrunner, 6 episodes
2010	Nomads	Yes	Yes	Yes	Unsold Pilot for The CW
2012	NYC 22	No	Yes	Yes	
2012	Ironside	No	Yes	No	
2019	Reef Break	Yes	Yes	No	
