= Souls of Totality =

- Directed by: Richard Raymond
- Story by: Ben Bolea; Kate Trefry
- Starring: Tatiana Maslany; Tom Cullen
- Release date: 2018 (HollyShorts)
- Countries: United States; United Kingdom
- Language: English

Souls of Totality is a 2018 British-American short film directed by Richard Raymond and starring Tatiana Maslany and Tom Cullen.

== Cast ==
- Tatiana Maslany as Lady 18
- Tom Cullen as Guy 3
- Helen Shaver as Shepherd One

== Release ==
The film premiered at the 2018 HollyShorts Film Festival.

== Reception ==
Alan Ng of Film Threat awarded the film 7.5 stars out of 10.

== Accolades ==
The film won the Best Grand Jury Award at the HollyShorts Film Festival and the Best Short Film award at the Raindance Film Festival.
