= Jason Stackhouse =

Fictional character

- True Blood character
- Ryan Kwanten as Jason Stackhouse
- First appearance: Novel: Dead Until Dark; Television: "Strange Love" (episode 1.01)
- Created by: Charlaine Harris
- Portrayed by: Ryan Kwanten

In-universe information
- Nicknames: Jay, Stackhouse, Jason Fuckin' Stackhouse, Girlfriend Fucker
- Species: Human (fairy ancestry); Werepanther (books only)
- Gender: Male
- Occupation: Parrish Road Crew Supervisor (Books) Police officer (TV series)
- Family: Sookie Stackhouse (younger sister); Adele Hale Stackhouse (grandmother); Niall Brigant (great-grandfather); Fintan Brigant (grandfather)
- Spouses: Novels: Crystal Norris Stackhouse (wife; deceased); Michelle Schulbert (wife)
- Children: Unnamed child (with Crystal; miscarriage); Unnamed child (with Crystal; deceased); Marie Stackhouse (with Michele); Corbett Stackhouse (with Michele)
- Relatives: Dermot Brigant (great-uncle); Claudine (deceased), Claudette,(deceased) and Claude Crane (both half cousins once removed); Hadley (cousin); Hunter Savoy (cousin once removed)
- Nationality: American

Jason Stackhouse is a fictional character from The Southern Vampire Mysteries book series by author Charlaine Harris. Introduced in the first novel, Dead Until Dark, Jason is Sookie Stackhouse's older brother and a road crew supervisor for Bon Temps, Louisiana.

Stackhouse is described as sexually active and has had many sexual relationships with women in Bon Temps and its neighbouring communities. Initially portrayed to be callow and selfish, Jason's character changes as the series progresses and he begins to mature and become more supportive of Sookie and her supernatural issues.

In Dead Until Dark, Jason is suspected of killing a series of girls in Bon Temps. Videotapes of his sexual encounters with each girl are damning evidence against him. However, Jason is eventually found innocent. In later books Jason is implicated in other crimes, and despite his innocence, these accusations continue to erode his reputation.

In Dead to the World, Jason disappears. This occurs shortly after he begins dating Crystal Norris from Hotshot, a community of werepanthers near Bon Temps. Finally, Sookie discovers that he was kidnapped by a jealous rival, who bit him repeatedly to turn him into a werepanther.

Jason is shown to greatly enjoy hunting with the werepanthers, though they don't fully accept him because he was not born a werepanther.

Like Sookie, Jason has fairy ancestry; many other characters assume it is the source of his sexual attractiveness.

== Relationships ==
In the novels, Crystal gets pregnant with Jason's baby, but she miscarries. When she gets pregnant again, Jason happily marries her. Sookie claims that Jason loves Crystal, but Crystal isn't sure that she loves Jason.

The immature couple quickly encounter marriage troubles, such as Crystal spending the household money on shopping instead of necessities. When Jason discovers that Crystal is having an affair, he tricks Calvin Norris and Sookie into catching her in the act. After that, Crystal moves back to Hotshot and Jason is shown to be dating other women.

Jason has been friends with Hoyt Fortenberry since they were children. Since Jason became a werepanther, their relationship has been strained; and it appears to end when Jason marries Crystal.

Jason then befriends werepanther Mel Hart, with unfortunate results. Crystal ultimately dies when she is crucified outside of Merlotts, and Jason again becomes a suspect, but he is eventually proven innocent.

== Television portrayal ==
In True Blood, an HBO series based on the books, this character is played by Ryan Kwanten.

=== Season 1 ===
Jason's reputation is tarnished when women he's been involved with, including his grandmother, are murdered. He becomes a suspect after having sex with Maudette and Dawn, both of whom are later found dead. Jason later falls in love with Amy, who is also murdered. In the first season finale, it is revealed that all four murders were committed by Drew Marshall, clearing Jason's name.

=== Season 2 ===
Jason joins the Fellowship of the Sun church and becomes popular for his physical prowess and performance as a vampire hater. Sarah manipulates and uses Jason to escape from her abusive husband and has an affair with him. Steve orders Jason's death under the assumption that he is a spy for the vampires after they capture Sookie, but Jason beats up Gabe and escapes. Sarah shoots Jason with a paintball gun as revenge, but he saves Sookie's life by shooting Steve with a paintball gun. Jason later apologises to Godric for being kept prisoner at the church, and Eric tells him he will call it even on the condition that Jason never does V again. Jason survives a massacre and apologizes to Bill for his past behaviour. He bonds with Sookie over watching Steve and Sarah's disastrous TV debate. When they arrive in Bon Temps, vandals greet them, and Jason rescues Andy and Sam from Maryann's followers with a chainsaw and a nail gun, but Sam surrenders to Maryann to save them.

=== Season 3 ===
In season three, Jason feels guilty about Eggs and wants to confess but Andy convinces him to stay quiet. Jason blackmails Andy to join the police force, becomes attracted to Crystal, and helps tip off the Hotshot residents about a drug raid. However, this leads to Crystal being kidnapped by Felton. Later, Jason kills Franklin Mott to save Tara and confesses to Sookie and Tara about Eggs.

=== Season 4 ===
In the year since Sookie's disappearance, Jason has become a police officer partnering up with Andy Bellefleur. Both he and Andy attempted to locate Sookie (including setting up a website and calling local news stations) but eventually came to believe Sookie had been killed by vampires. Not wanting to be reminded of the painful memories of Sookie's house, Jason sold it to an unknown company, later determined to be owned by Eric Northman.

Keeping his promise to Crystal, Jason also spent the year providing the Hotshot residents with food and supplies as he promised Crystal. On one of his visits, Felton returns and traps Jason in an old freezer. He later awakens tied to a bed and is greeted by Crystal and Felton. They reveal that they intent to change him into a werepanther so that they can use him to breed more werepanthers with Crystal as Felton is infertile. To this end, they bite him numerous times in werepanther form, feed him Viagra, and proceed to have the women of Hotshot (including Crystal) rape him while he suffers from fever. After numerous women rape him, Becky, a 12-year-old girl, is forced to participate. To prevent this from happening, Jason convinces her to free him, and Jason quickly escapes on foot after knocking out Luther and taking his knife. Felton doggedly pursues him as a werepanther, but Jason eventually takes him by surprise and kills him with a sharpened stick. Crystal appears afterwards, gleeful over Felton's death, and wishes for Jason to return to Hotshot to resume his role as a "ghost daddy." Jason vehemently refuses the offer and tells her he is done with her and Hotshot for good. Crystal lets him go under the belief that Jason will return on the full moon when he'll transform. Jason limps away, only to collapse later that night on the roadside. He is found by Hoyt Fortenberry and Jessica Hamby, who promptly revives him with her blood. As he is nursed back to health, he begins fantasizing about Jessica and, oddly, Hoyt.

Thinking he will turn into a werepanther through the upcoming full moon, Jason handcuffs himself to his bedpost to protect others. Sookie finds him and learns about the situation - she assures him that she will make the best of the situation and will not shoot Jason. When night falls, Jason flees into the woods to protect Sookie, who subsequently chases him. Jessica, who is working at Merlotte's, senses Jason in fear (since she had fed Jason her blood) and quickly finds Jason to protect him. It's eventually revealed that despite being bitten, Jason cannot turn into a werepanther because weres and shifters only get that power from being born as one. Jason, relieved, bonds with Jessica. They eventually part ways, though it's clear that feelings have developed between the two of them.

Jason is visited by Hoyt, who is distressed by his relationship problems with Jessica. The next day, he looks for Sookie to tell her the good news about his non-turning, but she is concerned about Eric, who has been bound by silver chains to prevent him from walking out into the sun (due to a dangerous witch spell by a newly resurrected Antonia). Realizing Jessica is in danger, Jason sprints to the mansion to rescue her. He is stopped temporarily by a guard, who he shoots (presumably non-fatally). He rushes to promptly save Jessica by throwing her back into the mansion. The spell is soon released and Jessica, indebted to Jason for saving her life, kisses him on the lips, which he returns. She apologizes and Jason places her back in bed under chains to rest and prepare for another possible spell. As per Bill's suggestion, Jason agrees to not report that Jessica killed the guard, a human. In turn, Jason would not be punished for the guard he shot "in the shoulder" outside. At night, Jessica visits Jason and tells him that she and Hoyt have broken up. Jason is angry that she would hurt his best friend and not only rejects her feelings for him but rescinds her invitation to his house.

The next day Jason gets a call from Hoyt - a possessed Lafayette has taken Arlene and Terry's baby and has threatened Hoyt with a gun. Jason responds to the call with Andy but cannot make much headway with Lafayette until Jesus comes and eventually puts the grieving mother spirit at peace. Later, Hoyt asks Jason to give Jessica a box of her belongings. Jason delivers the box - although he at first remains hesitant to get close to Jessica, they eventually make love in Jason's truck. Afterwards, Jason feels guilty knowing that it will ruin Hoyt if he finds out. He asks Jessica to glamour him to make him forget but she refuses and leaves angrily to feed on someone else.

Jason helps Sookie's cause to rescue Tara and other humans from Moon Goddess Emporium, which Bill plans to destroy to end the war with Antonia. He, Sookie, Jesus, and Lafayette approach the Emporium during daylight, but Jesus discovers it is protected by a spell. Jesus proves his worth to Antonia by breaking through the barrier and warns Sookie in his mind that Marnie has now turned sympathetic towards Antonia's cause. Soon the prisoners are broken free temporarily when the spell is lifted, and Tara and Holly run out to the embracing arms of Sookie and Lafayette. Jason lags behind slightly and is caught on the outside of Antonia's newly cast spell, which causes everyone else to be cast inside the shop. When Pam, Jessica, Eric, and Bill come armed to defeat Marnie, they are unable to make any progress because of the barrier. Marnie asks Eric and Bill to sacrifice themselves for Sookie's release, and while they both agree, Pam does not and launches a rocket launcher at the barrier, causing a massive explosion and injuring Jason severely. Jessica feeds him her blood again. Eventually, Marnie casts a spell to draw the vampires towards the deadly barrier, but Jason holds them back long enough before the spell is broken (when Jesus draws Antonia out of Marnie). Marnie is then killed by Bill and the prisoners are released.

Jason tells Hoyt about his relationship with Jessica, and Hoyt does not take it well as he beats Jason up. Later that night, on Halloween, Jessica visits Jason and he invites her in. They have sex, and Jessica suggest they should just stay friends as she is not ready for a relationship and Jason agrees to be friends.

=== Season 5 ===
At the beginning of Season 5, Jason is visited at home by Steve Newlin, who reveals he is a recently turned vampire and is a "Proud Gay American Vampire". Jason is flattered (calling it the nicest "I love you" by anyone) but politely declines because he's not sexually attracted to Steve. Steve gets angry and attempts to bite Jason. Jessica arrives and threatens Newlin as she is the Queen of Louisiana since Bill is gone (unbeknownst to her, he and Eric have been arrested by the Vampire Authority twice and Bill is no longer the monarch of Louisiana). Jason takes back his invitation from Newlin, who leaves immediately. Jason then goes to Merlotte's to see Hoyt, who is with his other 'true friends', but is coldly turned down. Jason still has feelings for Jessica and thinks the feeling is mutual, but upon going to visit her at Bill's she denies this, explaining she was just saying that to protect Jason from Newlin. Jessica is throwing a party, and Jason attempts to make a move on her but another guy makes a move before he can. A jealous Jason takes a sorority girl to have sex, but instead he takes her home.

Jason is later visited by an old schoolteacher with whom he previously had sexual relations. They have sex but immediately afterwards Jason begins to feel like he is being used for sex and this causes Jason to remember his past with his teacher as it really was (his teacher talked Jason into having sex with her while she was married and when he was only a student) and leaves her house in a hurry. Jason realizes that he was raped by his teacher and that his sexual desires early on are because of his teacher's influence; that all he had to offer anyone were sexual encounters that have ruined chances for a real loving relationship with anyone and starts to straighten up his life now that he has faced his past.

Later on, Sookie visits Jason and emotionally confesses that she killed Debbie and had Tara turned into a vampire. Jason recommends that she keep things to herself. The next day Andy tells him that Debbie's parents have left because they found what they were looking for. Jessica then glamours him into forgetting about the case, doing Jason a big favor. That night he, Andy, and Judge Clemens take a trip to a Fairy nightclub and there Jason meets his cousin Hadley, who believes Sookie is dead after disappearing at the end of Season 3. She firmly believes that Sookie needs to be protected from vampires, though Jason believes otherwise. She lets slip that vampires killed Jason's parents (while he had thought it was a flood) but she runs away before revealing more information. Jason pursues her but things turn violent in the club and he and Andy are thrown out. The next morning Jason has a dream about his parents that turns violent when he visualizes their violent deaths by vampire fangs. He later tells Andy that the nightclub they had visited the previous night was indeed for fairies. Jason visits his parents' graves and seems to start believing that what Hadley has said is true. He visits Sookie and asks her to accompany him to the fairy club once more. Sookie is told that vampires did in fact kill her parents, and she angrily lashes out but her powers are fading - she eventually finds out since she is half fairy her powers will drain soon. Jason visits Jessica to find comfort about what he has discovered about his parents, and bonds with Sookie. He stops Sookie from draining all her powers and convinces her to use her powers to find out who killed their parents. They return to the fairy nightclub and attempt to connect with the spiritual world to discover their parents' killer. Sookie sees a vision but cannot identify the killer.

Jason is disheartened when he finds out that Hoyt wants to forget his time in Bon Temps and particularly wants to forget his first love Jessica, and Jason. Jessica glamours Hoyt, who then leaves town to go to Alaska. Jason stops him in the police cruiser to try and prevent him from leaving Bon Temps, but he knows that Hoyt is happier this way and reluctantly lets him go. Jason and Sookie dig closer to the truth regarding to their parents' murderer, and they learn that there is a war coming between the vampires and the fairies. Jason meets Jessica, who has been commanded by a psychopathic Bill to turn Jason into a vampire. Jason shoots both guards dead before he is turned and learns from Jessica that Russel Eddington is on the loose. He then goes to warn Sookie at the Faerie Night Club. Jason, Sookie, and the faeries develop a plan to take down Russell by Jason acting as bait to lure Russell and Steve to the night club to attack the vampires when they're distracted by the scent of their blood. The next night, Russell and Steve show up and glamour Jason into giving away the location of the fairy nightclub. When the three of them arrive, Russell and Newlin cannot find the entrance - the Fairy Elder appears and stops Steve. However, she is unable to stop Russell and accidentally hits Jason with a ball of light which throws Jason into a tree where he gets a nasty concussion. Russell then drains the Elder Faerie and can see the entrance to the nightclub because of her blood. Although the fairies combine forces to attempt to stop Russell, it doesn't affect him. Eric suddenly appears and stakes Russell when he's caught off guard, killing him once and for all. Jason wakes up from being knocked out and begins having hallucinations of his parents, who begin to feed on his growing anger towards vampires. When Eric, Tara, and Nora request his and Sookie's help to stop the Authority and rescue Bill, Jason agrees to come along to protect Sookie because he believes a war is about to erupt between vampires and humans. When they infiltrate the Authority, Jason kills many of the Authority guards Sookie and Tara rescue Pam and Jessica and Eric and Nora disable the security system. Once Jessica and Pam are rescued, they take the elevator out while Sookie and Eric confront Bill. Jessica admits feelings for Jason, but he rebuffs her, saying he cannot love a vampire. In an extended scene, after Jason exits the elevator and kills another Authority guard, he announces he's coming for Warlow next. Nora, shocked at this, asks Jason what he knows about Warlow, revealing that she's also familiar with him.

=== Season 6 ===
When Season 6 begins, Jason is escaping the Authority with Jessica, Pam, Tara, Nora, Eric, and Sookie to evade the new Bill/Lillith entity that was created at the end of Season 5. On the news, the mayor indirectly declares war on vampires, calling for a vampire curfew and numerous other measures. As the group takes refuge at a beach, Nora believes that Jason knows more about Lillith and Warlow, and glamours him into getting more information. Jason is angry at this and threatens to shoot Nora unless she reveals what she knows about Warlow. The others see the conflict and Sookie says that Warlow was the enemy, not the entire vampire race. Jason takes this as Sookie taking the vampires' side, and he angrily storms off, leaving the party. He gets picked up by a mysterious driver, and Jason eventually begins to calm down after realizing the hallucinations of his parents are causing him to act crazy. When the driver possibly reveals himself as Warlow, Jason attempts to shoot him, but the stranger disappears and later uses light to stop the car before it crashes. The stranger then reveals himself as Jason and Sookie's fairy grandfather, Niall. Niall warns of Warlow, who he discovers has escaped, and says his powers are not to be underestimated. When Sookie returns home, Niall introduces himself and later explains over dinner that the Stackhouses are part of a royal bloodline. He trains Sookie to control her powers. Later that night, Warlow attacks and Niall tries to catch him but fails. Jason gets ready for action but inexplicably collapses. The next day, Sookie tends to him as he recovers from his "concussion", during which Sookie reveals that their parents were not racist against vampires but simply afraid of Sookie's powers. Later that night, Bill visits and restrains Jason while pleading with Sookie for her blood so they can synthesize it. She refuses and their relationship is officially over.

Another attack occurs later that night and Niall discovers it is Nora, tracking Warlow as well. Jason convulses again and Ben Flynn, who turns out to be half vampire in addition to being half fae, gives him his blood. He recovers quickly, much to Sookie's surprise, and Jason, high on V, does a lot of pullups and has sexual fantasies about Ben. Concerned, he sees Niall and they conclude that Jason must've been fed V to hallucinate like that. They pursue Ben in his hotel room but get caught in his trap. Ben turns out to be Warlow, who glamours Jason into forgetting the whole situation and feeling guilty about letting his grandfather Fairy get captured by Warlow. Warlow eventually casts Niall into the same prison that he was trapped in. Back on the job and out of the house (Sookie has plans for Warlow), Jason and Andy go to a gas station to investigate where Andy's now-teen fairy godchildren have gone but find that the clerk has been glamoured. When Jason returns home that night, he finds Sarah Newlin waiting for him outside, where she confesses that she has loved him ever since they met at the Fellowship of the Sun. They proceed to have sex. Afterward, a distraught Jessica arrives and is still in shambles after killing most of Andy's fairy daughters but gets distracted when Sarah comes out and calls Jessica a dead vampire whore. Sarah is upset that Jason has had sexual relations with Jessica in the past. Jessica and Sarah struggle but Sarah eventually rescinds the invitation to the house, forcing Jessica out and right into the hands of the police that Sarah had called.

The next morning, Jason leaves a message for Sookie saying that he messed up with Jessica and has been acting irresponsibly. He promises to make it up to her and everyone else. Jason then enters an army recruiting agency to join the LAVTF to rescue Jessica. He later shares stories with other soldiers, where he sees Sarah Newlin and privately tells her not to interfere with his plans. To torment Jason, Sarah takes him to see the fornication room, where Jessica and another vampire named James are supposed to have sex for research. Jessica is reluctant and stalls then James refuses to rape Jessica and she is taken away. Jason privately meets with Jessica and wants to take her away but she refuses, accepting her fate. She does ask to meet James, whom she would like to thank for being a gentleman, and Jason arranges this meeting, where James and Jessica make love. Sarah later throws Jason into Gen Pop now that the governor cannot protect him, but not before having his arm bled, making him vulnerable to the women vampires. Tara jumps to his protection. Violet claims Jason as her own as they get to know each other, and she successfully seduces him. Violet exclusively feeds on Jason in a special room and hence does not drink the tainted Trublood. When Eric, fueled by Warlow's blood, raids and kills all the guards in the compound, he finds Jason, drained of blood from Violet. Eric feeds him his blood to revive him, and Eric asks Jason when he dreams about him to think nice things about him. Then Jason takes Eric to the "white room" where they discover that although Sarah has opened the hatch exposing the sun, Bill has entered the room and allowed himself to be fed on by all the vampires to give them immunity to the sun (although Steve Newlin is left to burn by Eric). Jason then realizes that Sarah is still on the loose, so he chases her down and almost kills her, but eventually lets her go free because he doesn't want more blood on his hands. He and the rest of the vampire revelers celebrate at Bill's mansion, where he and Violet's relationship has intensified to the point where Violet does not allow Jason to even look at other women (like Jessica). Bill enlists Jason and Violet to ask for Andy and Adilyn's help to save Sookie from becoming Warlow's vampire/fairy wife. The group uses Adilyn's fae powers to teleport to the fairy realm where Sookie and Warlow are, where Jason shoots the chain-binding Sookie and rescues her. Everyone but Bill and Warlow teleport back and they travel to Sookie's house to let Sookie rest. However, Bill and Warlow take their fight to the house, where Warlow locks Jason, Andy, and Adilyn in the cellar and knocks out Violet. Warlow finds Sookie in the bathroom and is about to take Sookie away when Niall returns from the dark realm and pins Warlow—Jason, who has escaped thanks to Adilyn, then stakes Warlow.

Six months pass, and Hep V has mutated and transformed vampires into zombie-like creatures that run rabid at night. Jason and Violet have had a sexually active life but he has not had sex with her; Violet reminds him that she said she was going to make it hard for him. During a joint church session, newly elected mayor Sam announces that he and Bill have come up with a plan: to have all humans join in a monogamous relationship with a vampire in exchange for protection against Hep V mutated vampires, which is met with mixed reactions. Later, at the newly renamed Bellefleur's Bar & Grill, there is a party where all of Bon Temps enjoy food and drinks. Unbeknownst to them, a group of Hep V mutants are approaching the party.

=== Season 7 ===
==== Episode 1: "Jesus Gonna Be Here" ====
Season 7 begins with a violent attack at Bellefleur's. Arlene, Holly, and various other people are taken. Jason himself is almost killed but Violet saves him. In the grisly aftermath, Jason calls Andy to request assistance. Everybody is upset but before things get too hectic, Bill suggests finding the H-Vamps before they get to them, who will most likely be sleeping in windowless rooms. Andy tells Jason to search Old Reeve's Place. Along the way, Jason asks Violet how many people she's seen die, and she says she's lost count. At the house, they find Vince, an anti-vampire politician and vigilante who plans to succeed Sam as mayor, leading a gang of anti-vampire haters. Jason says they are acting irrationally, but Violet escalates things when she threatens to kill them. When the group disbands, Jason is unhappy with the way the situation handled. Afterward, Jason is angry at Violet for what happened, and they proceed to have sex.

==== Episode 2: "I Found You" ====
The next day at the church, Jason falls asleep and proceeds to have a sexual fantasy with Eric (due to taking Eric's blood in the previous season). When Eric asks him if he's happy being in a relationship with Violet, Jason hesitates and then lies that he's happy with it, indicating he's unhappy with their relationship. Jason is later jolted awake when a congregation outside the church is meeting. Sam suggests that people keep busy and be indoors by sundown, only going out at night with a vampire. To find the kidnapped civilians, Sookie suggests searching a dead body she had seen earlier. The girl is from Saint Allis, so she, Jason, Alcide, Sam, and Andy travel to the nearby town only to discover the entire town is abandoned and full of dead bodies. When they find the girl's house, Jason gathers that it's been a few days since the attack and that the vampires keep coming back. After discovering no significant leads, they return to Bon Temps.

==== Episode 3: "Fire in the Hole" ====
Jason discusses a future with Violet and proposes the idea of children. Violet laughs and says he has softened up, but Jason assures her he's still a warrior but also a modern man. Andy arrives and tells them about Vince's posse. Adilyn thinks they might be after Sookie. There is a tense moment between Violet and Jessica before they set out to find Sookie. Jason leaves another message for Sookie on her cell phone, which had been tossed away earlier. The group encounters Vince's posse. Maxine Fortenberry, who is in the group, wants to deal with Jason and Jessica personally. She shoots Jessica in the shoulder, which leads to Violet ripping her heart out. Jason realizes Jessica is not healing and not even Jessica knows why. The group later ambushes a group of Hep-V vampires attacking Sookie, who was being used as bait, and successfully kills the infected vampires. Alcide is shot and killed in the fight.

==== Episode 4: "Death Is Not the End" ====
The next day, Jason must be the bearer of bad news as he calls Hoyt and tells him his mother was killed. He is heartbroken because Hoyt had been glamoured and does not remember their friendship and refers to Jason simply as an officer. He and Sam also visit Rosie and tell her that Sheriff Deputy Kevin Ellis has died. Later, Jason, Sam, and Sookie visit Andy's house to ask Holly what happened to the rest of the prisoners. Sookie finds out that they are being held in Fangtasia. In a tense scene in the car, Sam wants to ambush Fangtasia head on but Jason threatens him with a gun and orders him to turn around. Sam reluctantly agrees. A crew is assembled to assault Fangtasia, which includes Sookie, Bill, Jason, Eric, Pam, Jessica, Violet, and 2 others. Sookie and Eric create a diversion in the front while the rest of them sneak in, but before much can be done, Vince's posse attacks with Molotov cocktails. In the chaos, Arlene, who had been violently fed on by the Hep-V vampires at Fangtasia, almost dies but is saved by vampire blood from Keith.

==== Episode 5: "Lost Cause" ====
The next night, Jason and Violet attend a party at Sookie's house that Lafayette and Alcide's father throws in order to cheer Sookie up. At one point in the night, Jessica runs up to Jason and begs her to dis-invite her boyfriend James because he found him cheating on her with Lafayette in their car. Jason immediately rescinds the invitation. He consoles a distraught Jessica and lets her know that her girlfriend Violet is not perfect and is rather off. The two share a kiss and end up having sex, which Violet hears from the hallway. Jason returns to Violet's home later that night, where Violet has a romantic evening in store for Jason to win his affection back. The next morning, after a steamy night, Jason gets a call from Jessica, who asks that he bring Sookie over to the Compton estate because she has news for Sookie that she must tell in person. Jason sneaks out to see Sookie. Violet, who presumably heard Jason's conversation with Jessica, seethes with anger and plots revenge. At the Stackhouse residence, Jason wakes Sookie up and insists that she go talk to Jessica in person. When they finally meet Jessica at the Compton estate, she breaks the news that Bill is Hep-V positive. Sookie and Jason don't believe it, but Sookie remembers that she had been exposed to Hep V blood in the bloody aftermath of the shooting that left Alcide dead. Because she had an open wound from letting Bill feed on her, she thinks she may be infected. She gets tested and later finds out that she is indeed positive. Jason tries to comfort her.

==== Episode 6: "Karma" ====
Jason later returns to Violet's but finds that the basement is ransacked. Violet has left a note stating that the relationship is not working. Jason is relieved.

==== Episode 7: "May Be the Last Time" ====
As Jason cleans his house the next morning, he gets a call from Arlene at Bellefleur's. She says that Hoyt is back in town to visit his dead mother. He goes over to the restaurant and is immediately struck by how beautiful Hoyt's new girlfriend Bridget is. He tries to stop looking at her, but he can't help himself as he is invited to eat breakfast with them. Later, at the police station, Hoyt grieves over his mother's body and Bridget quietly asks Jason (who somewhat knew his mother) to comfort Hoyt in his time of need. Jason says some kind words and Hoyt embraces him while Bridget also joins the hug. Jason looks uncomfortable.

==== Episode 8: "Almost Home" ====
Later that night, Jason, Hoyt, and Bridget look through Hoyt's photo album. When Bridget casually brings up kids, Hoyt becomes upset that Bridget would think about children when he is grieving for his mother. Bridget apologizes but is interrupted by Jason, who has received multiple picture messages of Adilyn, Wade, and Jessica from Violet, who has them all tied up and gagged. Jason quickly leaves but not without Bridget, who is growing frustrated at Hoyt for not listening to what she has to suggest. Jason tries to convince her to stay, and Hoyt apologizes, but Bridget refuses to come along. Jason reluctantly takes her to Violet's house. At the house, he gives a gun to Bridget to protect herself while he goes inside to investigate. Only minutes after he steps inside the house, he is abducted by an angry Violet, who puts him in a room where Wade, Adilyn, and Jessica are being held prisoners. Violet threatens to torture all of them before she breaks down and confesses that she only wants Jason to love her completely. Before she can finish, she is shot by Hoyt and meets the true death. Hoyt frees everybody and makes up with Bridget, who is following close behind. Jessica is surprised to see Hoyt and they rekindle some of their old romance. Bridget talks to Jason afterward, who appears quite sad. She asks him if Jessica is his girlfriend, to which he says he doesn't know what to call her. Jason drives Jessica home that night, where Jessica shares that her relationship with Jason has been one of the only things in her life recently that hasn't been confusing, and that he has always been there for her. Jason confesses that he loves spending time with Jessica, but he feels that they are in a bubble when they are together. He doesn't know what to call that. Jessica calls it a beautiful friendship, before Kissing him and heading off.

==== Episode 9: "Love Is to Die" ====
The next morning, Jason has breakfast at Bellefleur's and is joined by Hoyt, who says that while he should have been thinking about his mother or Bridget last night, he can't stop thinking about Jessica. Jason and Arlene are both concerned. That night, Jason gets a call from a distressed Bridget, who has just broken up with Hoyt after Jessica comes over and reveals that she and Hoyt used to be lovers. Jason rushes to Hoyt's house to find Hoyt and Jessica talking. Jason tries to reason with Hoyt about what Jessica might have told him, but Hoyt swiftly knocks Jason out. Jason awakens inside his car, where Bridget is driving to the hospital so Jason can get his head treated after suffering a concussion. He laughs and says he has dealt with worse concussions before. He offers to go back to his place but warns her that he and Bridget will not have sex tonight. Bridget laughs and says that won't happen, especially after she just broke up with Hoyt. Later, Bridget tries to book an airline ticket back to Anchorage for the next day but is unable to convince the airline attendant at Delta. Jason takes the call and quickly convinces her to book the flight for Bridget, which impresses her. He then bids Bridget good night and tries not to think about having sex with her. A few hours pass and Bridget cannot sleep because her head is spinning and she is hungry. Jason offers beer and he finally reveals the situation between Jessica and Hoyt, confirming that they used to be lovers and Hoyt had been glamoured so he did not remember Jessica but she remembered him. Jason calls himself a bad person for interfering in the relationship but Bridget constantly assures him that he is a sweet and caring person who is more than just a good-looking person. Instead of having sex, they simply lie next to each other in bed and proceed to bond over their personal lives.

==== Episode 10: "Thank You" ====
The next morning, Jason is awakened by Sookie, who tells him that Bill wants Sookie to give him the True Death. Jason confesses that he has little advice to give regarding the situation. Later, he receives a call from Hoyt, who asks him to be his best man (he and Jessica have decided to get married). After getting dressed and picking some flowers, Jason and Sookie head over to Bill's house for the wedding. Jason and Hoyt bond over their childhood and reconcile their differences. Jason is glad to have Hoyt back in his life. The wedding goes as planned. Afterward, Jason asks Sookie what is on her mind, and Sookie reveals that she can now read Bill's mind, which makes no sense to either of them. Sookie also tells him that she approves of Bridget and that he shouldn't have to worry about having sex with her now that Hoyt is married. Jason insists that he won't and sends Bridget to the airport.

Almost 4 years later, after Sookie agreed to stake Bill, leaving her heartbroken, New Blood has been released to the market, and the Hep V epidemic has ended. Jason and Bridget are married with many kids. The last scene shows the family and friends of Sookie and Jason enjoying dinner at the Stackhouse.
