= Lawless (American TV series) =

1997 American television series

- Created by: Ken Sanzel
- Starring: Brian Bosworth; Glenn Plummer
- Country of origin: United States
- Original language: English
- No. of seasons: 1
- No. of episodes: 6 (5 unaired)

Production
- Production company: Columbia Pictures Television

Original release
- Network: Fox
- Release: March 21, 1997

Lawless is an American detective television series created by Ken Sanzel for Fox. Notable for starring former NFL player Brian Bosworth, it performed so poorly on television it was canceled after its premiere.

== Premise ==
The series centers on John Lawless, an ex-special forces operative who became a motorcycle riding private investigator in Miami's South Beach.

== Cast ==
- Brian Bosworth as John Lawless
- Glenn Plummer as Reggie
- Janet Hubert as Esther Hayes
- Jay Amor as Manuel Oriba
- Rus Blackwell as Todd
- Oscar Torre as Rico

== Production ==
The pilot was initially written and produced by Ken Sanzel, starred Daniel Baldwin as the lead, and had a vastly different tone from the final product. After the initial pilot was produced, Frank Lupo was hired as the showrunner and cast a new lead actor and reshot the show to be more in line with his prior work. In January 1997, it was reported that Brian Bosworth had been cast as the series lead with filming set to begin in the South Beach neighborhood of Miami Beach, Florida after Bosworth and the producers decided against filming in Hawaii. On his decision to set the series in Florida instead of Hawaii, Bosworth stated he wanted to go for authenticity despite the allure of filming in Hawaii as he observed:

People go to Hawaii to smoke dope and chill. People go to South Beach to smoke crack and kill.

The show was cancelled partway through its premiere after it had flipflopped between Friday and Saturday air dates and the remaining five episodes shot were never released.
