= Don't Fade Away =

- Directed by: Luke Kasdan
- Written by: Luke Kasdan
- Produced by: Luke Kasdan; Kirk M. Hallam; Arik Ruchim; Nicole Peluso
- Starring: Mischa Barton; Ryan Kwanten; Beau Bridges; Ja Rule
- Cinematography: Bruce McCleery
- Edited by: Michael Trent
- Music by: Brian Ralston
- Distributed by: Property New Films International
- Release date: April 6, 2011 (Australia)
- Running time: 90 min.
- Country: United States
- Language: English
- Budget: $10 million

Don't Fade Away is a 2011 coming-of-age drama film starring Mischa Barton and Ryan Kwanten. The film was produced by Origin Entertainment Group and was shot in Los Angeles and North Carolina. It was released on DVD in Australia on April 6, 2011.

== Plot ==
Life was easy for Jackson White (Kwanten). With looks, brains, and athletic ability, the world's possibilities seemed limitless. But, when he came to Los Angeles to pursue a career in the music industry, he was so seduced by money and status that he lost track of who he was. Now, with both his personal and professional lives on the edge of ruin, he's been called home to care for his dying father. While in North Carolina and Los Angeles, he'll have to confront the friends he lost track of and the girl he never met.

== Cast ==
- Mischa Barton as Kat
- Ryan Kwanten as Jackson White
- Beau Bridges as Chris White
- Ja Rule as Foster Johnson
- Jenn Sterger as Amber
