= The Replacement Killers =

1998 American action film directed by Antoine Fuqua

- Theatrical release poster
- Directed by: Antoine Fuqua
- Written by: Ken Sanzel
- Produced by: Bernie Brillstein; Brad Grey
- Starring: Chow Yun-fat; Mira Sorvino; Michael Rooker; Jürgen Prochnow
- Cinematography: Peter Lyons Collister
- Edited by: Jay Cassidy
- Music by: Harry Gregson-Williams
- Production companies: Columbia Pictures; Brillstein-Grey Entertainment; WCG Entertainment Productions
- Distributed by: Sony Pictures Releasing
- Release date: February 6, 1998
- Running time: 87 minutes
- Country: United States
- Languages: English; Cantonese
- Budget: $30 million
- Box office: $39.5 million

The Replacement Killers is a 1998 American action film directed by Antoine Fuqua in his feature directorial debut, from a screenplay by Ken Sanzel. It stars Chow Yun-fat, Mira Sorvino, Michael Rooker, Kenneth Tsang, and Jürgen Prochnow. The film follows an emotionally disillusioned assassin who is forced to settle a violent vendetta for a ruthless crime boss.

The film was a co-production between Columbia Pictures, Brillstein-Grey Entertainment, and WCG Entertainment Productions. It marked the American acting debut for Chow, as his previous film credits had been in Chinese-language productions. Filmmaker John Woo executive produced and choreographed the action sequences. The musical score was composed by Harry Gregson-Williams.

The Replacement Killers premiered in theaters in the United States on February 6, 1998, and grossed $39.5 million worldwide against a $30 million budget. It has a 38% approval rating on Rotten Tomatoes and a consensus of "mixed reviews" on Metacritic.

== Plot ==
During an orchestrated drug bust at a marine loading dock, LAPD detective Stan Zedkov kills Triad lieutenant Peter Wei.

Looking to exact revenge for his son's death, Peter's father, Terence, sends for professional assassin John Lee. Paying off an old debt, Lee has already killed two targets for Wei, who now tells him that this third and final job will settle the obligation. However, Lee's conscience prevents him from completing his final assignment: to assassinate Zedkov's seven-year-old son Stevie before the detective's eyes.

Realizing that his actions will result in retaliation against his mother and sister, Lee prepares to return to China, enlisting the help of old friend Alan Chan, a monk in a local Buddhist temple, to make arrangements to have his family moved to a secure location. Infuriated by Lee's disobedience, Wei orders his head lieutenant, Michael Kogan, to lead the hunt for Lee, and has his people in China begin the search for Lee's family.

No longer able to use the Triad network to get out of the country, Lee searches for alternative means outside Wei's sphere of influence, and looks to skilled forger Meg Coburn for a new passport. Before she can finish the job, Wei's men storm Meg's office, destroying the computerized tools of her trade in the ensuing shootout. Lee escapes; Coburn is picked up by the police, unsuccessfully interrogated by Zedkov, and released as bait so the detective can see who tries to kill her. Meanwhile, Wei hires two skilled out-of-town contract killers named Ryker and Collins to take over the hunt for Lee and the Zedkov contract.

Lee finds Coburn when she returns to her destroyed office. Having been made aware that the Triads are involved, Coburn wants out, but Lee forces her to finish her original task of creating a forged passport. Traveling with Coburn, and with the two "replacement killers" in pursuit, Lee gets pictures from a photo booth and phones Alan, who offers the use of his passport. When Lee arrives at the temple, he discovers that Alan has been tortured to the point of death. Alan tells Lee that his family was moved to Canton—but he told his torturers they were in Shanghai. Lee has little more than 24 hours before his family is found. The monk gives Lee his passport before dying in his arms.

Holed up in a hotel, Coburn finishes altering Alan's passport for Lee. The two exchange stories, and Coburn becomes sympathetic to Lee. Feeling compelled to stop the killing of Zedkov's son before leaving the country, Lee forces one of Wei's men to reveal the plan, which is to kill Stevie while he and his father are at a movie festival inside a cinema. Lee and Coburn, who insists on helping, arrive barely in time to prevent Ryker and Collins from killing the boy, and Ryker is killed by Lee in the subsequent gunfight.

Concerned that Lee and Coburn will make their way back to his base of operations, Wei makes plans to flee the country and hunt down Lee's mother and sister himself. However, when two guards open the main gate for Wei and his entourage to leave in a limo, Lee is just outside. He launches a two-handed handgun assault while Coburn surfaces moments later, driving a truck through the melee, incapacitating Kogan, and later killing him. When Collins fires from a high perch on Lee and Coburn, Lee soon outflanks Collins, killing him from behind. Finally, Lee corners Wei on a fire escape platform. Though both men have emptied their guns, Lee is first to reload. Wei promises Lee that the boy and Lee's family will still die, but Lee replies, "Not in your lifetime", and kills him. Though Zedkov arrives before Lee and Coburn can get away, he lets them go, taking only their guns.

Coburn reluctantly bids goodbye to Lee at the airport, presenting him with one last gift, passports for his mother and sister.

== Cast ==
- Chow Yun-fat as John Lee
- Mira Sorvino as Meg Coburn
- Michael Rooker as Detective Stan Zedkov
- Kenneth Tsang as Terence Wei
- Jürgen Prochnow as Michael Kogan
- Til Schweiger as Ryker
- Danny Trejo as Collins
- Clifton Collins Jr. as "Loco"
- Carlos Gomez as Detective Hunt
- Frank Medrano as Eddie Rawlins
- Carlos Leon as Romero
- Leo Lee as Lam
- Patrick Kilpatrick as Pryce
- Randall Duk Kim as Alan Chan
- Andrew J. Marton as Stevie Zedkov
- Sydney Coberly as Sara Zedkov
- Yau-Gene Chan as Peter Wei
- Nicki Micheaux as Nicole, police technician

== Production ==
=== Filming ===
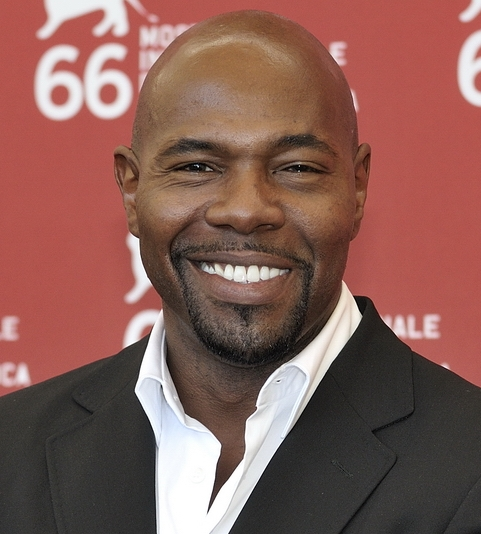
Director Antoine Fuqua

Production for the film began on February 10, 1997, in downtown Los Angeles. The first shoot was set in the historic Mayan Theater, refurbished as a trendy nightclub and cast with hundreds of extras for the film's opening scene. The eight-story, nearly condemned Giant Penny building in the middle of Los Angeles served as the location for a police station interior, a hotel room, and Meg Coburn's office. A chaotic gunfight was filmed amid the spray, brushes, and hoses of Joe's Car Wash, also in Los Angeles. A Chinatown-like streetscape of damp, narrow alleys and blinking red neon lights was created for the night-time finale, where Yun-Fat shot off 546 rounds of two-fisted shooting; the repetitive action left his hands blistered and shaking. More gunplay took place in a video arcade replicated at the original Lawry's California Center (now the Los Angeles River Center and Gardens), just north of downtown Los Angeles. Lee's tranquil Buddhist temple was fashioned under this same roof.

Director Antoine Fuqua stressed to his team that the aim was to design a "Taxi Driver for the 1990s". In addition to physical training, Mira Sorvino, who had never handled a gun prior to this film, took weapons training to prepare for her role. Sorvino, who majored in Asian studies at Harvard, speaks Mandarin, and lived for eight months (1988–89) in Beijing, where she studied Chinese, taught English, and saw Chinese films, including Hong Kong action films. She felt The Replacement Killers brought her a step closer to her goal of making a film in Mandarin and working with a Chinese director. Prior to the start of filming, Sorvino had blown out her voice from screaming in reshoots of Mimic; Fuqua liked the effect and asked her to keep it, which required Sorvino to yell prior to each day's shoots to burn out her voice.

== Themes ==
The Replacement Killers explores assassination, violence and the influence of organized crime in modern society.

== Music ==
=== Soundtrack ===
The original motion picture score was composed by Harry Gregson-Williams. Alan Meyerson mixed the sound elements for the chorus, while Richard Whitfield edited the film's music. The soundtrack for the film was released on March 10, 1998, by the Varèse Sarabande music label.

The Replacement Killers: Original Motion Picture Score

Film score by Harry Gregson-Williams
- Released: 3/10/1998
- Length: 36:17
- Label: Varèse Sarabande

The Replacement Killers: Original Motion Picture Score
No.	Title	Length
1.	"John's Theme"	2:43
2.	"Stalked"	3:58
3.	"The Temple"	2:28
4.	"He Means Business"	3:16
5.	"Kill or Be Replaced"	2:18
6.	"We Have Visitors..."	2:11
7.	"John Reflects"	2:04
8.	"Surreal Shoot-Out"	3:57
9.	"John Traps His Man"	3:47
10.	"Race Against Time"	3:04
11.	"The Heavies Arrive"	2:53
12.	"Final Confrontation"	3:38
Total length:		36:17

=== Additional music ===
In addition to the film score by Harry Gregson-Williams, several licensed songs were included on the soundtrack (although never officially released as a cd) including:

- "Keep Hope Alive" by The Crystal Method
- "Jaan" by Talvin Singh featuring Amar
- "Makes Me Wanna Die (The Weekend Mix)" by Tricky
- "Rocco" by Death In Vegas
- "Boom Boom Caw" by Brad
- "33" by Hed PE
- "Escape From The City Of Angels" by Ithaka (featuring Marta Dias)

== Release ==
The Replacement Killers premiered in cinemas on February 6, 1998, in wide release throughout the US, and had a five-week theatrical run.

=== Home media ===
Following its cinematic release in theaters, The Replacement Killers was released on DVD and VHS by Columbia TriStar Home Video in the United States on July 1, 1998. Special features for the DVD included scene selections, the "Chow Yun-Fat Goes Hollywood" featurette, and the HBO special "Where the Action is". A VHS format edition was released on March 30, 1999.

On March 5, 2002, a Special Edition DVD was released. Features included digitally mastered audio and anamorphic video, widescreen presentation, audio in English 5.1 (Dolby Digital), Spanish, French, Portuguese, subtitles in English, Spanish, French, Portuguese, Chinese, Korean, and Thai, director's commentary, the HBO making-of "Where the Action Is", deleted scenes, alternate ending, the "Chow Yun-Fat Goes Hollywood" featurette, theatrical trailers, filmographies, animated menus, and scene selections with motion images.

A UMD version of the film for the Sony PlayStation Portable was released on August 9, 2005. The disc features DVD quality picture, languages in Chinese, English, Korean, Portuguese, Spanish, and Thai, and viewing options for color and black and white.

An extended-cut DVD adding approximately 10 minutes to the film was released on April 25, 2006. Special features included the "Chow Yun-Fat Goes Hollywood" featurette, digitally remastered picture and sound, and the edited HBO special "Where the Action Is".

The widescreen hi-definition Blu-ray version of the film was released on September 11, 2007. Special features included HBO's making-of "Where the Action Is" and the "Chow Yun-Fat Goes Hollywood" featurette. A supplemental Video on demand viewing option is available as well.

== Reception ==
=== Box office ===
During its February 6, 1998, US opening weekend, the film ranked second place, grossing $8,046,553 at 1,936 locations. The film Titanic came in first place during that weekend grossing $23,027,838. Its revenue dropped by 49% in its second week of release, earning $4,068,335. For that particular weekend, the film fell to sixth place still screening in 1,936 theaters. Titanic remained in first place grossing $28,167,947 in box office revenue. During its final week in release, The Replacement Killers opened in a distant 21st place with $131,727 in revenue. The film went on to top out domestically at $19,204,929 in total ticket sales through a 5-week theatrical run. For 1998 as a whole, the film would cumulatively rank at a box office performance position of 90. Worldwide, the film grossed $39.5 million in all territories.

=== Critical response ===
Rotten Tomatoes reports that 37% of 38 sampled critics gave the film a positive review; the average score is 5.3 out of 10. The consensus summarizes: "Chow Yun-fat makes his dubious English-language debut in The Replacement Killers, a stylish but muddled knockoff of the Hong Kong shoot-em-ups that earned the star his international renown." At Metacritic, which assigns a weighted average out of 100 to critics' reviews, the film received a score of 42 based on 22 reviews, which it classifies as "mixed or average reviews". Audiences polled by CinemaScore gave the film an average grade of "B−" on an A+ to F scale.

"What I liked about the film was its simplicity of form and its richness of visuals. There's a certain impersonality about the story; Chow and Sorvino don't have long chats between the gunfire. They're in a ballet of Hong Kong action imagery: bodies rolling out of gunshot range, faces frozen in fear, guys toppling off fire escapes, grim lips, the fetishism of firearms, cars shot to pieces, cops that make Dragnet sound talky."
—Roger Ebert, writing for the Chicago Sun-Times

Among some of the positive critiques, Roger Ebert writing in the Chicago Sun-Times called it "as abstract as a jazz instrumental, and as cool and self-assured". Discussing the film's style, he remarked that it was a "high-gloss version of a Hong Kong action picture, made in America but observing the exuberance of a genre where surfaces are everything". In Variety, Leonard Klady viewed the film as being a "big, loud music video that's not particularly interested in content. It's a rudderless style piece; as the old saw cautions, accept no substitutes." Regarding the film's set design and production qualities, he noted that, "while an apt homage, the set pieces here are technical but not visceral, feeling manufactured rather than organically integrated into the plot".

Russell Smith of The Austin Chronicle said the film was "so numbingly ritualistic that even the well-choreographed gun battles, probably the most Woo-like aspects of the film, lose much of their potential impact". Writing for The New York Times, Stephen Holden noted that although the film's "seamless fusion of Hong Kong action-adventure style and cool, Los Angeles street chic has a certain seductive charm, it is the only charm of a movie that is otherwise devoid of content". Edward Guthmann in the San Francisco Chronicle said that "As pointless blast-athons go, The Replacement Killers isn't bad. It's beautifully shot by first-time feature director Antoine Fuqua, whose eye for sensual surfaces, deft camera moves and elegant framing was refined with commercials and music videos."

Desson Thomson of The Washington Post stated that "Without Chow Yun-Fat, who makes his American screen debut here, there'd be nothing to say about The Replacement Killers. Antoine Fuqua's action movie is entirely free of surprise. It breaks no rules." He did however muse that "Chow's pretty face and cool presence are inescapable. You don't enjoy this movie, so much as you conduct a road test for the Hong Kong actor. Yes, he can survive in an English language picture!" In the San Francisco Examiner, Walter Addiego perceived that the film "remains a counterfeit of a Woo movie, even though Woo himself co-produced it. He turned the directing chores over to first-timer Antoine Fuqua, whose previous work was limited to music videos and commercials, and it shows." He added, "The script, by Ken Sanzel, is the work of someone who's seen Woo's movies and wasn't particularly moved by the experience."

=== Crew's response ===
In retrospect, Antoine Fuqua said: "The Replacement Killers was a good and bad experience. It was great because Chow Yun-Fat is the coolest guy in the world. He was just beautiful. Mira Sorvino was cool. It was fun working with Mira. But the difficult thing was learning the studio system, learning all the things that go along with that system. There are a lot of people that have a lot of say, especially when you're that young in the studio world. You learn that it is a business. I think for me, what I learned was I still love making movies, and I know what I don't want to do. The thing that I learned the most out of that movie was what I don't want to do." Later he said: "People liked the movie, they had fun with it. It was tough because I didn't think everything all the way through. I didn't realize Chow Yun-fat didn't speak English. So, he was thinking more about how to say the words while trying to get a performance. Then you have so many bullets flying around. In retrospect, it's OK." Ken Sanzel, who wrote the movie, said: "The script bears very little resemblance to anything I would have written; only the bare bones of the plot really survived. I think that Chow Yun-Fat was incredible, but for me the movie was a series of otherwise bad decisions. I'm glad that people enjoy it, but it was really Antoine Fuqua's sensibility top to bottom, which is not at all mine (aside from the fact that we both love the work of Michael Mann, though apparently for very different reasons)."

Mira Sorvino said: "I loved working with Antoine, and it was fun to do an action movie. It was kind of like being a kid and playing cowboys and Indians, or cops and robbers. And I enjoyed the role of Meg. I thought she was fun to do."

== Bibliography ==
- Ariano, Tara (2005). Hey! It's That Guy!. Quirk Books. ISBN 978-1-59474-042-8.
- Armstrong, Richard (2009). Encyclopedia of Film Themes, Settings and Series. McFarland. ISBN 978-0-7864-4572-1.
- Dancyger, Ken (2010). The Technique of Film and Video Editing, Fifth Edition: History, Theory, and Practice. Focal Press. ISBN 978-0-240-81397-4.
- DeMott, Benjamin (2000). Killer Woman Blues: Why Americans Can't Think Straight About Gender and Power. Houghton Mifflin Harcourt. ISBN 978-0-395-84366-6.
- Deri, Mark (1999). The Pyrotechnic Insanitarium: American Culture on the Brink. Grove Press. ISBN 978-0-8021-3670-1.
- Elder, Robert (2005). John Woo: Interviews. Conversations with Filmmakers. University Press of Mississippi. ISBN 978-1-57806-776-3.
- Holmlund, Christine (2008). American Cinema of the 1990s: Themes and Variations. Rutgers University Press. ISBN 978-0-8135-4366-6.
- Mathijs, Ernest (2007). The Cult Film Reader. Open University Press. ISBN 978-0-335-21923-0.
- Morton, Lisa (2009). Cinema of Tsui Hark. McFarland. ISBN 978-0-7864-4460-1.
- Slocum, David (2000). Violence and American Cinema. AFI Film Readers. Routledge. ISBN 978-0-415-92810-6.
- White, Jerry (2007). The Films of Kiyoshi Kurosawa: Master of Fear. Stone Bridge Press. ISBN 978-1-933330-21-1.
