= Desert Dancer =

2014 film by Richard Raymond

- North American theatrical release poster
- Directed by: Richard Raymond
- Written by: Jon Croker
- Produced by: Luis Astorquia; Pippa Cross; Izabella Miko; Parisa Dunn
- Starring: Freida Pinto; Reece Ritchie; Tom Cullen; Makram J. Khoury
- Cinematography: Carlos Catalán
- Edited by: Chris Gill; Celia Haining
- Music by: Benjamin Wallfisch
- Production companies: CrossDay Productions Ltd.; Head Gear Films; Lipsync Productions; May 13 Films; Morocco Film Assistance
- Distributed by: Metrodome Distribution (UK)
- Release dates: 3 July 2014 (Germany); 10 April 2015 (United States); 15 April 2016 (United Kingdom)
- Running time: 104 minutes
- Countries: United Kingdom; United Arab Emirates; Romania; Morocco
- Language: English
- Budget: $4 million
- Box office: $432,560

Desert Dancer is a 2014 British biographical drama film directed by Richard Raymond and written by Jon Croker. Starring Reece Ritchie and Freida Pinto, the film is based on the true story of Afshin Ghaffarian, a young, self-taught dancer in Iran, who risked his life for his dream to become a dancer despite a nationwide dancing ban.

== Synopsis ==
Set in Iran, the story follows the ambition of Afshin Ghaffarian. During the volatile climate of the 2009 presidential election, Afshin and some friends, including Elaheh, risk their lives and form an underground dance company. The group learned the dancing from videos of Michael Jackson, Gene Kelly and Rudolf Nureyev even though the online videos are banned. Afshin and Elaheh also learn much from each other and learned how to embrace their passion for dance and for one another.

== Cast ==
- Reece Ritchie as Afshin Ghaffarian
- Joshan Ertan as voice of young Afshin
- Freida Pinto as Elaheh
- Nazanin Boniadi as Parisa Ghaffarian
- Tom Cullen as Ardavan
- Marama Corlett as Mona
- Simon Kassianides as Sattar
- Akin Gazi as Farid Ghaffarian
- Tolga Safer as Stephano
- Makram Khoury as Mehdi

== Production ==
Richard Raymond makes his full-length film directorial debut working with acclaimed choreographer Akram Khan, whose work featured in the Olympic opening ceremony at London 2012. Raymond produced the film through his May 13 Films banner. Freida Pinto undertook an intensive training schedule for the role that comprised eight hours of dance rehearsals every day for 14 weeks. Photo call for the film was held at the Palais des Festivals during the third day of the 65th annual Cannes Film Festival in Cannes, France on Friday May 18, 2012. Relativity Media acquired North America distribution rights to the film at 2013 American Film Market.

== Release ==
Desert Dancer premiered in Germany on July 3, 2014. It opened the Ischia Global Film & Music Fest in Ischia, Italy on July 13, 2014.

The film premiered in Hong Kong on August 28, 2014 and in the United States on April 10, 2015.

== Reception ==
The film received a mixed reception from critics. As of September 2021, the film holds a 32% approval rating on the review aggregator Rotten Tomatoes, based on 44 reviews with an average score of 5.3/10. The website's critics consensus reads: "Desert Dancer never finds an agreeable rhythm, resulting in a musical drama that doesn't deliver on the promised spectacle or political commentary."
