= India: Nature's Wonderland =

2015 BBC nature documentary television series

- Genre: Nature documentary
- Narrated by: Liz Bonnin, Freida Pinto and Jon Gupta
- Country of origin: United Kingdom
- Original language: English

Production
- Production location: India
- Production company: BBC Natural History Unit

Original release
- Network: BBC
- Release: September 2015 – September 2015

India: Nature's Wonderland is a BBC nature documentary television series that aired in September 2015. Hosted by Liz Bonnin, Freida Pinto and Jon Gupta, the series documents the wildlife of India.

== List of episodes ==
Episode 1

Liz, Jon and Freida reveal India's hidden natural wonders; the Gir forest, home to the last Asiatic lions, the rare hoolock gibbons and the Anaimalai Hills of Kerala, which act as pathways for the local elephants.

Episode 2

This episode looks at the relationship the Indian people have with nature and the conservation efforts in place to save the wildlife.
