= Blunt Force Trauma (film) =

2015 film by Ken Sanzel

- Film poster
- Directed by: Ken Sanzel
- Written by: Ken Sanzel
- Produced by: Gary Preisler; Eric Brenner
- Starring: Ryan Kwanten; Freida Pinto; Carolina Gómez; Mickey Rourke
- Cinematography: Paulo Perez
- Edited by: Matt Mayer
- Music by: Darren Jackson
- Production companies: ETA Films; Global Film Partners; Monogram Entertainment
- Distributed by: Voltage Pictures
- Release date: July 20, 2015 (Los Angeles)
- Running time: 97 minutes
- Countries: United States; Colombia
- Language: English

Blunt Force Trauma is a 2015 American-Colombian neo-Western action film written and directed by Ken Sanzel. It stars Ryan Kwanten, Freida Pinto, Carolina Gómez, and Mickey Rourke.

The film premiered in Los Angeles on July 20, 2015, before being released on DVD and Blu-ray on October 6, 2015.

== Premise ==
Pinto plays a woman looking for her brother's killer. The film is based on a banned shooting game, revolving around duelists using kevlar vests. The rules are that one may not aim for lethal shots, and that should one fall out of a predesignated ring in which each contestant is standing, they lose. You may also tap out, similar to other combat sports.

== Cast ==
- Ryan Kwanten as John
- Freida Pinto as Colt
- Carolina Gómez as Marla
- Mickey Rourke as Zorringer
- Christian Tappan as Emmet
- Maruia Shelton as Wesley
- John Alex Castillo as Bernie
- Herbert King as Walton
- Jason Gibson as Huey
- Andrés Suárez as Mendez
- Rubén Zamora as Silva
- Daniel Abril as Rodrigo
- Silvia De Dios as Doctor
- Carmenza Cossio as Roxanne
- Jon Mack as Reggie
- Steven Galarce as Arch
- Victor Gomez as Toby
- Tatiana Ronderos as Sandra

== Production ==
Principal photography was done entirely in Bogotá, Colombia in 2014. In North America, Alchemy is the film's distributor. It competed in the Woodstock Film Festival and the Montreal World Film Festival.

== Reception ==
John DeFore of The Hollywood Reporter criticized the film, stating that it "takes itself much more seriously than viewers will."
