= Afshin Ghaffarian =

Iranian choreographer, director

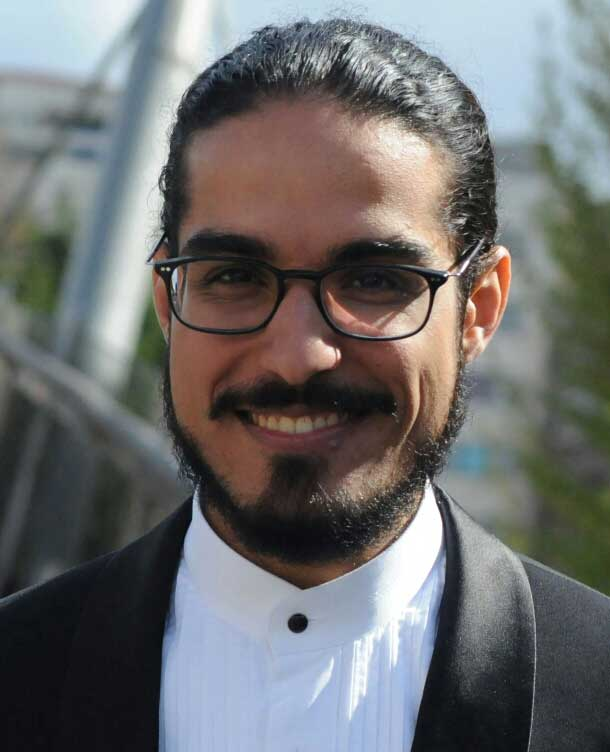
- Afshin Ghaffarian in 2014
- Born: December 15, 1986 (age 39); Mashhad, Iran
- Education: Soureh Art school Mashhad Branch; Islamic Azad University Central Tehran Branch (BA); Centre National de la Danse; Pantheon-Sorbonne University
- Occupations: choreographer, director, dancer, actor
- Known for: Desert Dancer inspired by his life

Afshin Ghaffarian (Persian: افشین غفاریان, Persian pronunciation: [æfʃiːn-e ɢæˈffɒːɾiːɒːn]; born 1986 in Mashhad) is an Iranian choreographer, director, dancer, and actor, participating primarily with the group "Reformances". Desert Dancer is a 2014 movie inspired by his life. Ghaffarian was portrayed by Reece Ritchie.

== Biography ==
Ghaffarian started his art career in 1999, in Saba Art Center. He holds a high school diploma in Cinema, and a Bachelor of Arts in Theatre from Islamic Azad University Central Tehran Branch.

In late 2009, he received media attention after his performance in "Strange But True", part of Iranian cultural festival in Mulheim an der Ruhr, Germany. As the play ended, he appeared with a green bracelet, a sign of Iranian Green Movement, chanting "Where is my vote?". He did not return to Iran and went to France as a refugee where he started the dance company "Reformances". He met and collaborated with Shahrokh Moshkin Ghalam in France. During 2010–2011, he attended Centre National de la Danse.

Ghaffarian is the founder of the "Reformances" company (a portmanteau of the words Reform and Performance).

In 2014, Afshin renounced his refugee status in France and he decided to go to Iran, a travel which put an end to his five years of exile, but he is still living in Paris. He is currently studying political science at the Sorbonne in Paris.

== Books, article and interviews ==
- (Persian) Hervé Pons, Le corps de l'acteur ou la nécessité de trouver un autre language: six entretiens romains avec Pippo Delbono, Translated by Afshin Ghaffarian, 2015. ISBN 978-600-119-859-5
- (in Persian) Thomas Richards. At Work with Grotowski on Physical Actions. Translated by Afshin Ghaffarian. Ghatreh, 2011. ISBN 978-964-341-868-7.
- (in French) Afshin Ghaffarian, Baptiste Pizzinat. Café Des Réformances . La Compagnie des réformances, 2013. ISBN 9782954430706.
- (in French) Afshin Ghaffarian. "I condemned myself to exile". La revue 6mois, 2014.
- (in English) Afshin Ghaffarian. "Interview with Afshin Ghaffarian: from desert dancer to reformancer…". Reformancers.com, 2015.
- (in English) Afshin Ghaffarian. "Interview with P E O P L E F O L I O". peoplefolio.com
