= Ryan Kwanten =

Australian actor

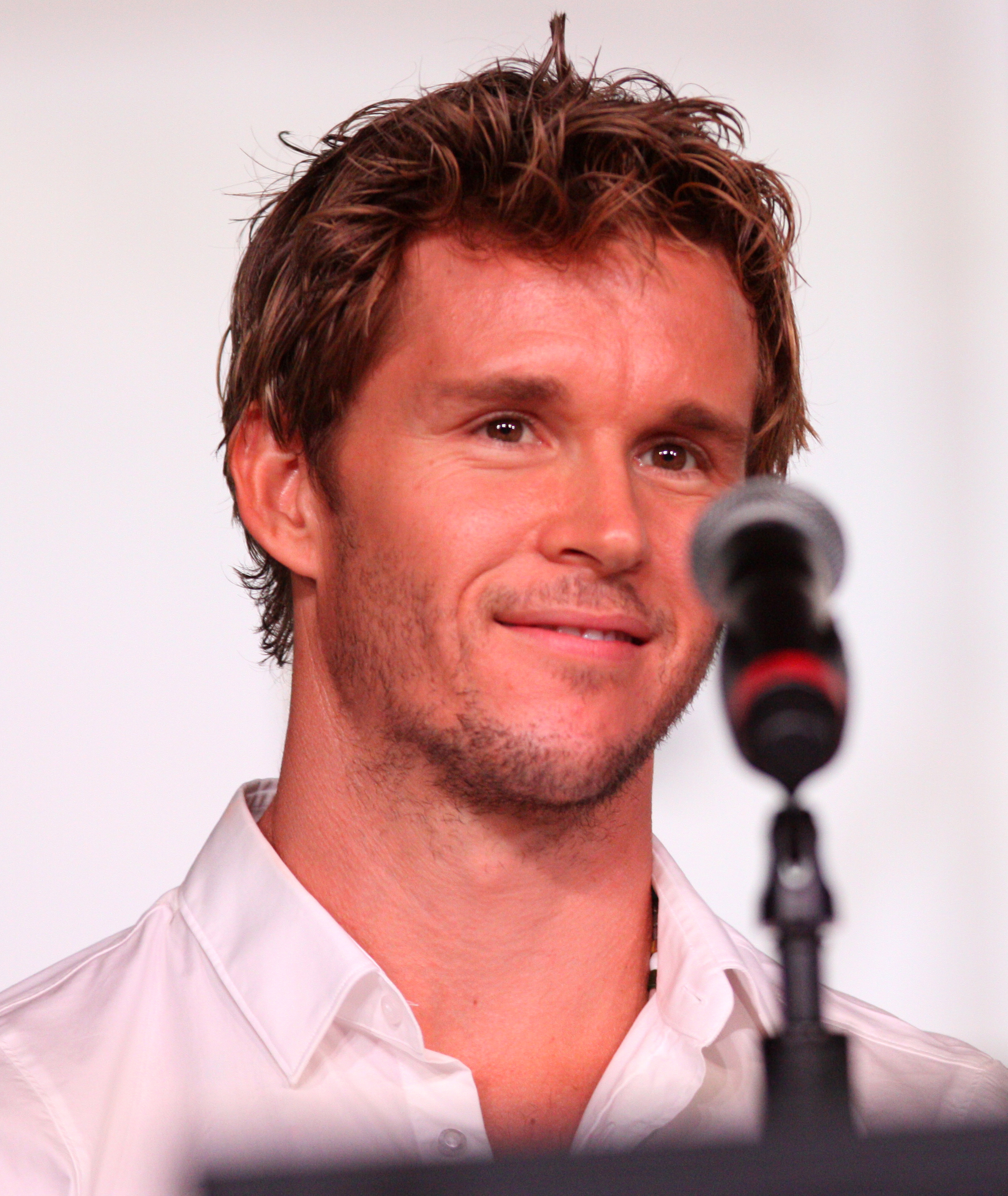
- Kwanten in 2012
- Born: Australia
- Occupation: Actor
- Years active: 1991–present

Ryan Kwanten is an Australian actor. He played Vinnie Patterson from 1997 to 2002 in the Australian soap opera Home and Away. After his stint ended, he joined the American teen drama series Summerland, portraying Jay Robertson and starred in the family drama film Flicka. From 2008 to 2014, he played Jason Stackhouse in True Blood. From 2018 to 2019 he produced and starred in the crime drama series The Oath as Steve Hammond. In 2021 he starred in season one of the horror drama anthology series Them as George Bell. In 2022, he portrayed Thomas Weylin in Kindred, a series adaptation based on Octavia E. Butler's celebrated 1979 novel of the same name.

== Early life and education ==
Ryan Kwanten and his two brothers, Mitchell and Lloyd, were raised in Sydney, New South Wales. Their mother, Kris, is a Lifeline op shop coordinator, and their father, Eddie Kwanten, a worker at NSW Maritime, was born in The Netherlands.

Kwanten attended St Paul's Catholic College in Manly. He later earned a degree in commerce from The University of Sydney, after commencing his acting career.

== Career ==
Kwanten began acting on the television shows A Country Practice, Hey Dad..! and Spellbinder. In 1997, he joined the cast of the Australian soap opera Home and Away, playing lifeguard Vinnie Patterson. He eventually chose to leave the series in 2002, shortly after his character married and became a father. Kwanten had previously guest starred on the serial as Robbie Taylor in 1994. Moving to the United States, Kwanten was cast as Jay Robertson in Summerland (2004–05). He appeared in the films Flicka (2006), with Maria Bello, Alison Lohman and Tim McGraw, and Dead Silence (2007), a horror film in which he played the leading role, Jamie Ashen.

Kwanten appeared in a Law & Order: Special Victims Unit episode that aired on 2 December 2008, in which he portrayed Dominic Pruitt, a US Marine Corps Master Sergeant accused of raping and murdering a pregnant fellow Marine. In 2009, he starred in the film Don't Fade Away with Mischa Barton and Beau Bridges. In 2010, Kwanten voiced the role of Kludd in the animated-epic film Legend of the Guardians: The Owls of Ga'Hoole, although he was originally set to voice the film's protagonist Sorren before the role went to Jim Sturgess.

Kwanten played the role of Jason Stackhouse in the HBO series True Blood, based on Charlaine Harris's The Southern Vampire Mysteries series of novels, which aired from 2008 until 2014. In 2010 he starred in the psychological thriller Red Hill, which was directed by Patrick Hughes. He won a lead role in the 2013 Joe Lynch comedy-horror film Knights of Badassdom along with Steve Zahn, Summer Glau and Peter Dinklage. In October 2010, it was announced that Kwanten will play Charles Manson in an upcoming, yet-to-be-titled biopic, to be directed by Brad Anderson. In 2012, he appeared in Joe Penna's video "Dual Action". In 2013, Kwanten played Marvel character "Venom" in the short film Truth in Journalism and portrayed Conall in the 2014 action adventure film Northmen: A Viking Saga.

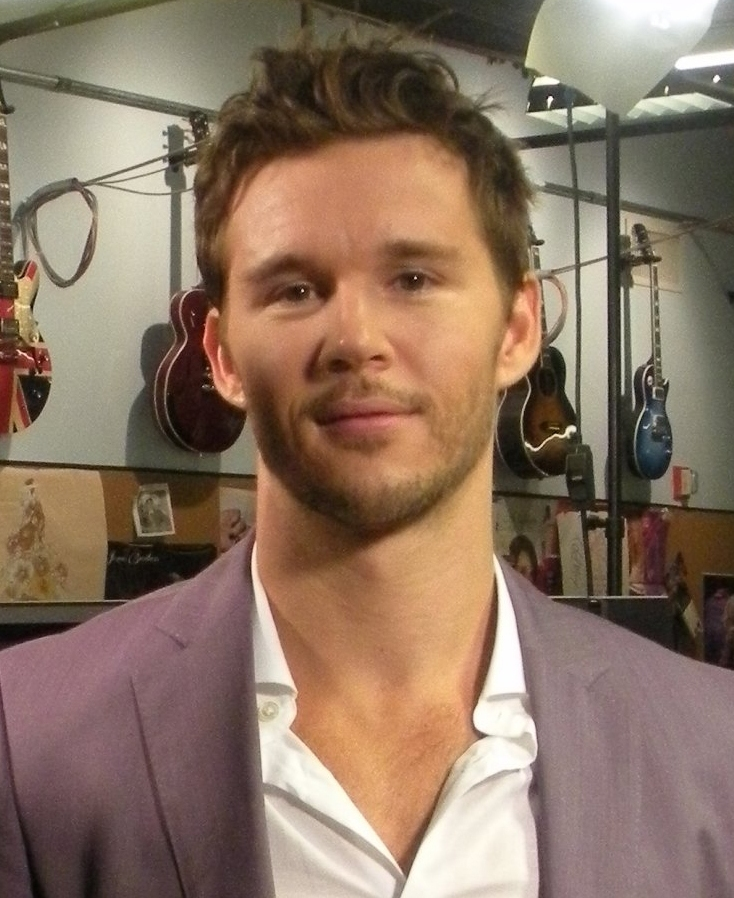
Kwanten in 2010

In 2015, Kwanten voiced the role of Blinky Bill, a koala in Blinky Bill the Movie alongside Rufus Sewell, Toni Collette, Robin McLeavy, David Wenham, Richard Roxburgh, Deborah Mailman, and Barry Humphries.

In 2019, Kwanten was a series regular in the second season of Blumhouse Television and Facebook Watch's Sacred Lies: The Singing Bones, playing the character of Peter Wolfe, an inmate and the estranged father of the series' protagonist, Elsie, played by Jordan Alexander. The series takes inspiration from a Brothers Grimm fairy tale as well as real-life murder cases.

From 2018 to 2019 he produced and starred in the crime drama series The Oath as Steve Hammond.

His most recent roles include 2067, an Australian-American science fiction film in which he plays Jude Mathers, 2021's Them, as milkman George Bell, and Kindred, a TV adaptation of Octavia Butler's novel of the same name.

== Filmography ==
=== Film ===
| Year | Title | Role | Notes |
|---|---|---|---|
| 1994 | Signal One | Kid | |
| 2003 | Liquid Bridge | Nick McCallum | |
| 2004 | America Brown | Ricky Brown | |
| 2006 | Flicka | Howard McLaughlin | |
| 2007 | Dead Silence | Jamie Ashen | |
| 2010 | Red Hill | Shane Cooper | |
| 2010 | Griff the Invisible | Griff | |
| 2010 | Legend of the Guardians: The Owls of Ga'Hoole | Kludd (voice) | Animated film |
| 2010 | Don't Fade Away | Jackson White | |
| 2012 | Not Suitable for Children | Jonah | |
| 2013 | Mystery Road | Pete Bailey | |
| 2013 | Truth in Journalism | Eddie Brock / Venom | Short film |
| 2013 | The Right Kind of Wrong | Leo Palamino | |
| 2013 | Knights of Badassdom | Joe | |
| 2014 | Flight 7500 | Brad Martin | |
| 2014 | Rio, I Love You | Jai Arnott | Segment: "Acho Que Estou Apaixonado" |
| 2014 | Northmen: A Viking Saga | Conall | |
| 2014 | Reach Me | Jack Burns | |
| 2015 | Kidnapping Freddy Heineken | Jan "Cat" Boellard | |
| 2015 | Blinky Bill the Movie | Blinky Bill (voice) | Animated film |
| 2015 | Blunt Force Trauma | John | |
| 2016 | Who Gets the Dog? | Clay Lonnergan | |
| 2018 | Supercon | Matt Wheeler | |
| 2018 | The Hurricane Heist | Breeze | |
| 2019 | Kill Chain | Ericson | |
| 2020 | 2067 | Jude Mathers | |
| 2022 | Expired | Jack | |
| 2022 | Glorious | Wes | |
| 2022 | Section Eight | Jake Atherton | |
| 2023 | Head Count | Sawyer | |
| 2023 | The Portrait | Alex | |
| 2025 | Primitive War | Ryan Baker | |

=== Television ===
| Year | Title | Role | Notes |
|---|---|---|---|
| 1991 | The Case-Book of Sherlock Holmes | Stagecoach driver | Uncredited; episode: "The Boscombe Valley Mystery" |
| 1992 | Home and Away | Boogie boarder | Episode 1018 |
| 1992 | A Country Practice | Ben Lloyd | 2 episodes |
| 1993–1994 | G.P. | Scott Browning | 2 episodes |
| 1994 | Home and Away | Robbie Taylor | Episode 1451 |
| 1994 | Hey Dad..! | Richard | Episode: "Rebel Without a Clue" |
| 1995 | Echo Point | Nathan Potter | Unknown episodes |
| 1996 | Water Rats | Nipper | Episode: "Iron Man" |
| 1997 | Spellbinder: Land of the Dragon Lord | Josh Morgan | Main cast; 26 episodes |
| 1997–2002 | Home and Away | Vinnie Patterson | Role held: 14 July 1997 – 1 March 2002 |
| 2002 | The Junction Boys | Claude Gearheart | Television film |
| 2003 | The Handler | Barnes | Episode: "Off the Edge" |
| 2004 | Tru Calling | Jake Voight | Episode: "Closure" |
| 2004–2005 | Summerland | Jay Robertson | Main cast; 26 episodes |
| 2008–2014 | True Blood | Jason Stackhouse | Main cast; 80 episodes |
| 2008 | Law & Order: Special Victims Unit | Master Sgt. Dominic Pruitt | Episode: "PTSD" |
| 2012 | New Girl | Oliver | Episode: "Valentine's Day" |
| 2014 | Jake and the Never Land Pirates | Brewster the Beast Trapper (voice) | Episode: "Tick Tock Trap" |
| 2014 | The Eric Andre Show | Himself | Episode: "Ryan Kwanten; Béyoncé & Jay-Z" |
| 2018–2019 | The Oath | Steve Hammond | Main role and producer |
| 2019 | Sacred Lies | Peter Wolfe/Hunter | Main role |
| 2019 | Creepshow | Alex Toomey | Episode: "The Right Snuff/Sibling Rivalry" |
| 2021 | Them | George Bell | 10 episodes |
| 2022 | Kindred | Tom Weylin | Main cast |

== Awards and nominations ==
| Year | Award | Category | Work | Result |
|---|---|---|---|---|
| 2009 | Scream Award | Best Horror Actor | True Blood | Nominated |
| 2009 | Satellite Award | Best Ensemble, Television | True Blood | Won |
| 2010 | Screen Actors Guild Award | Outstanding Performance by an Ensemble in a Drama Series | True Blood | Nominated |
| 2010 | Teen Choice Award | Choice TV Actor: Fantasy/Sci-Fi | True Blood | Nominated |
| 2010 | Australian Film Institute Award | Best Actor | True Blood | Nominated |
| 2010 | Australians in Film | Breakthrough Award | —N/a | Won |
| 2011 | Film Critics Circle of Australia Award | Best Actor | Red Hill | Nominated |
| 2015 | Kids' Choice Award | Favorite Voice in an Animated Film | Blinky Bill The Movie | Nominated |
