= Summer Loving (Shameless) =

- Shameless episode
- Episode no.: Season 2 Episode 2
- Directed by: John Wells
- Written by: Mike O'Malley
- Cinematography by: Rodney Charters
- Editing by: Shannon Mitchell
- Production code: 2J5952
- Original release date: January 15, 2012
- Running time: 52 minutes

Guest appearances
- Joan Cusack as Sheila Jackson; Molly Price as Dottie; Madison Davenport as Ethel; Noel Fisher as Mickey Milkovich; Emma Greenwell as Mandy Milkovich; Gloria LeRoy as Aunt Ginger; Johnny Sneed as Richard; Jane Galloway Heitz as Claire; Jernard Burks as Antoine; Amy Smart as Jasmine Hollander

Episode chronology
← Previous "Summertime"	Next → "I'll Light a Candle for You Every Day"
- Shameless season 2

"Summer Loving" is the second episode of the second season of the American television comedy drama Shameless, adapted from the British series of the same name. It is the 14th overall episode of the series and was written by consulting producer Mike O'Malley, and directed by series developer John Wells. It originally aired on Showtime on January 15, 2012.

The series is set on the South Side of Chicago, Illinois, and depicts the poor, dysfunctional family of Frank Gallagher, a neglectful single father of six: Fiona, Phillip, Ian, Debbie, Carl, and Liam. He spends his days drunk, high, or in search of money, while his children need to learn to take care of themselves. In the episode, Frank finds a woman as he looks for a possible new home, while Lip gets jealous of Karen's new friendship.

According to Nielsen Media Research, the episode was seen by an estimated 1.25 million household viewers and gained a 0.7 ratings share among adults aged 18–49. The episode was positively reviewed by critics, who praised its dark humor and performances.

== Plot ==
With Sheila (Joan Cusack) continuing to improve on her agoraphobia, Frank (William H. Macy) worries he might get kicked out of the house. At the Alibi, he finds a new financial plan in former bar patron Dottie (Molly Price), whose declining health makes her an ideal match for him. Though Dottie is initially hostile towards Frank, she eventually warms up to him, letting him perform chores around her house.

Ian (Cameron Monaghan) and Mandy (Emma Greenwell) pick up Mickey (Noel Fisher) from prison. Ian and Mickey rekindle their sexual relationship, and when Mickey explains that he needs to find a job, Ian convinces Linda (Marguerite Moreau) into giving Mickey a job at the store. Debbie (Emma Kenney) and Carl (Ethan Cutkosky) both complain to Fiona over wanting more space in the house; Debbie is annoyed by Liam, whom she shares the same bedroom with. Fed up, Debbie moves Liam's crib into the boys' shared bedroom, much to the dismay of Carl; Fiona decides to let Carl make his own bedroom in their old van. Fiona (Emmy Rossum) juggles her job, family life, and a burgeoning love life; Jasmine (Amy Smart) tries setting Fiona up with a sugar daddy, Richard (Johnny Sneed), but Fiona dislikes the fact that Richard is married. Karen (Laura Slade Wiggins) continues to pursue a sex-free relationship with Jody (Zach McGowan) while pursuing a sexual relationship with Lip (Jeremy Allen White). After seeking advice from Kevin (Steve Howey), Lip comes to believe that Karen is ready to settle down with Jody.

Veronica (Shanola Hampton) takes some of the elderly people from the retirement home on an excursion. As she gets them back to the retirement home, one of the seniors, Harry (Robert Sutton), has a stroke. When Debbie arrives at the retirement home, she is astonished to see ambulances taking Harry's corpse. Frank tries to seduce Dottie, but she refuses to get intimate with Frank, revealing that her heart could explode if her blood pressure increases. That night, Lip waits outside Karen's house and sees her passionately kissing Jody on the mouth. Angry, he decides to leave instead.

== Production ==
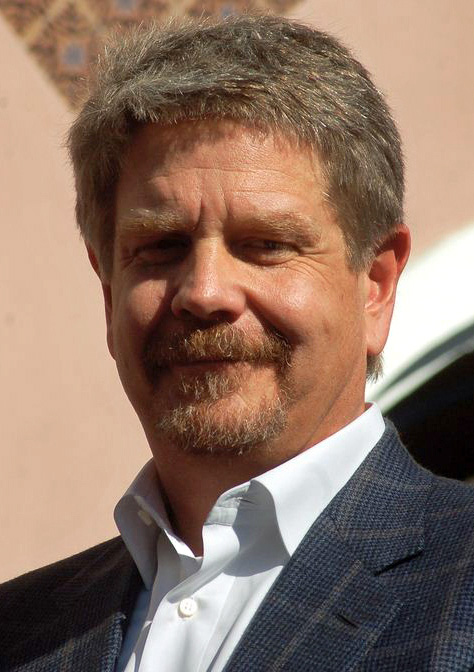
The episode was directed by John Wells.

The episode was written by consulting producer Mike O'Malley, and directed by series developer John Wells. It was O'Malley's second writing credit, and Wells' second directing credit.

== Reception ==
=== Viewers ===
In its original American broadcast, "Summer Loving" was seen by an estimated 1.25 million household viewers with a 0.7 in the 18–49 demographics. This means that 0.7 percent of all households with televisions watched the episode. This was a 21 percent decrease in viewership from the previous episode, which was seen by an estimated 1.58 million household viewers with a 0.8 in the 18–49 demographics.

=== Critical reviews ===
"Summer Loving" was positively reviewed by critics. Tim Basham of Paste rated the episode 7.4 out of 10 and wrote, "More than a score of running subplots could muddy up an hour-long cable series, but Shameless' creators weave them all into a cohesive story, dodging between the comedic and the tragic. An adept cast and some slick editing have a lot to do with it." Kevin Fitzpatrick of TV Overmind wrote, "I didn't find anything all that emotionally affecting about Shameless's second entry into the season, but 'Summer Loving' at least keeps enough brewing for more interesting episodes ahead."

Leigh Raines of TV Fanatic gave the episode a 4 star rating out of 5 and wrote, "The fact that Frank is a depraved lunatic is an accepted fact on Shameless. In "Summer Loving," he was off on his latest misadventure of cozying up to a dying woman in order to get her pension when she finally kicks the bucket." Kelsea Stahler of Hollywood.com wrote, "One of the great things about Shameless is that even when you get a set-up episode, it's still vastly entertaining."

Joshua Alston of The A.V. Club gave the episode a "B–" grade, writing "I enjoyed "Summer Loving" a bit more than I did the season premiere, but I'm still waiting for a more equitable balance from upcoming episodes." Alston objected to Frank's storyline with Dottie, calling it "especially distasteful", and criticized the series' continued focus on Frank: "I just don't care that much about Frank as a character. When I care about Frank, it's because his actions have the potential to affect characters I'm more invested in. [...] I can't muster enough interest in whether or not Frank finds another person to mooch off of."
