= Can I Have a Mother =

- Shameless episode
- Episode no.: Season 2 Episode 6
- Directed by: John Dahl
- Written by: William H. Macy; Steven Schachter
- Cinematography by: Rodney Charters
- Editing by: Kelley Dixon
- Production code: 2J5956
- Original release date: February 12, 2012
- Running time: 53 minutes

Guest appearances
- Joan Cusack as Sheila Jackson; James Wolk as Adam; Madison Davenport as Ethel; Zach McGowan as Jody; Tyler Jacob Moore as Tony Markovich; Stephanie Fantauzzi as Estefania; Rob Benedict as Dr. Noah Pitts; Lisa K. Wyatt as Constance; Louise Fletcher as Peggy Gallagher

Episode chronology
← Previous "Father's Day"	Next → "A Bottle of Jean Nate"
- Shameless season 2

"Can I Have a Mother" is the sixth episode of the second season of the American television comedy drama Shameless, an adaptation of the British series of the same name. It is the 18th overall episode of the series and was written by main cast member William H. Macy and Steven Schachter, and directed by John Dahl. It originally aired on Showtime on February 12, 2012.

The series is set on the South Side of Chicago, Illinois, and depicts the poor, dysfunctional family of Frank Gallagher, a neglectful single father of six: Fiona, Phillip, Ian, Debbie, Carl, and Liam. He spends his days drunk, high, or in search of money, while his children need to learn to take care of themselves. In the episode, Frank is dismayed upon learning his mother has been released from prison, while Karen and Jody prepare for their wedding party.

According to Nielsen Media Research, the episode was seen by an estimated 1.44 million household viewers and gained a 0.8 ratings share among adults aged 18–49. The episode received mostly positive reviews from critics, who praised the performances and the focus on Frank's relationship with his mother.

== Plot ==
Frank's mother, Peggy "Grammy" Gallagher, is released from prison on medical furlough. She has Carl break a wall in the bathroom, where she retrieves money and a gun she hid before being sent to prison. She then pays Carl and Debbie for their silence.

Fiona is surprised when Steve reveals he is married to a Brazilian woman, Estefania. They decide to go on a double date, with Fiona bringing Adam along. Both Fiona and Steve head to the bathroom, where Steve reveals he married Estefania to pay off a debt he owed towards Estefania's father Nando, a mafia mob leader. As they argue, they kiss and almost have sex before stopping. When they return, Adam correctly deduces they had an encounter and angrily walks off. Ian starts ignoring Lip, with the family believing that it was because Ian insulted Karen.

Frank is shocked to discover his mother in the bar, and she asks him to help him in retrieving money. While taking a stop with Sheila, Peggy insults her, prompting Sheila to kick Peggy out of the house. Frank then accompanies Peggy into meeting Dr. Noah Pitts, her partner-in-crime who abandoned her to the police. Peggy wants $200,000 she is owed, and gives him one day to retrieve it. Peggy then confides in Frank that she plans to kidnap Noah's children as a collateral. Frank secretly meets with Noah, asking him to pay him forward to avoid risking the lives of his children. Noah is only able to give him $75,000, but threatens to call the police if they contact him. Peggy is angry that Frank reduced her demands, and stabs him in the leg when he keeps some of the money for himself.

At a wedding party for Karen and Jody, a drunk Lip shows up despite not being invited, while Sheila, overwhelmed by the large crowd of people, mixes her medication with alcohol. When Peggy insults Sheila, the latter goes on a drunken tirade, finally calling out Peggy for her actions. This prompts Peggy to aim her gun at her, only to be stopped by Steve. Following the incident, Lip talks with Karen over her baby, and they seemingly reconcile. However, Lip states that he wants her to get an abortion, causing a furious Karen to slap him. After finding out that Clyde had died, Ethel packs her bags and secretly runs away with Malik, horrifying Kevin and Veronica . They also discover that they stole Kevin's marijuana, using it to get cash and leave the city. Seeing Steve back, Debbie finally reveals his real identity as Jimmy to Fiona.

Frank is disappointed to learn that Eddie gave his insurance money to Karen, and he lashes out at Jody. Sheila, finally seeing Frank's true colors, kicks him out of her house. He is forced to return home, where Peggy has found out that he has been cashing Aunt Ginger's checks, and she explains she will stay for some time. This causes Frank to go on an angry tirade, blaming her for his life. Peggy is not affected by his words, claiming he was always a loser from birth. Seeing this, Fiona joins Frank outside to comfort him.

== Production ==
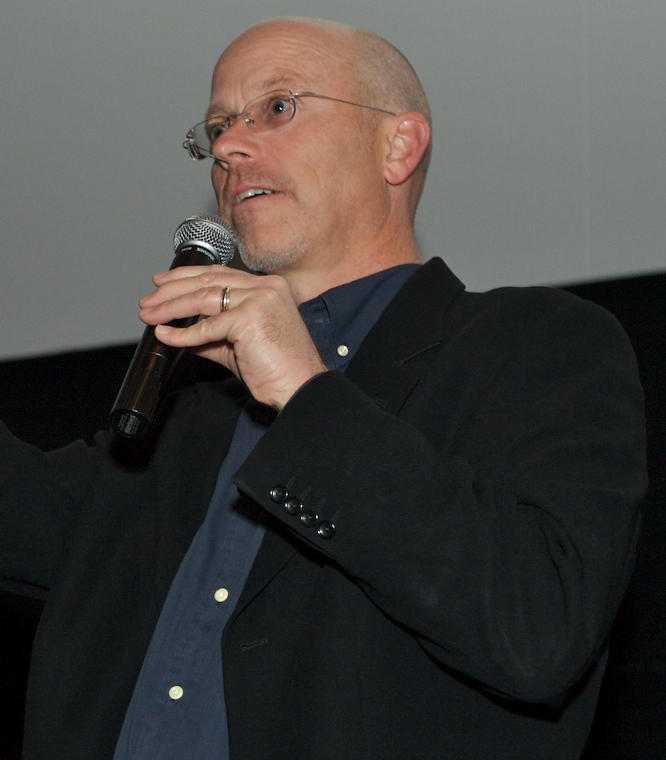
The episode was directed by John Dahl.

The episode was written by main cast member William H. Macy and Steven Schachter, and directed by John Dahl. It was Macy's first writing credit, Schachter's first writing credit, and Dahl's second directing credit.

== Reception ==
=== Viewers ===
In its original American broadcast, "Can I Have a Mother" was seen by an estimated 1.44 million household viewers with a 0.8 in the 18–49 demographics. This means that 0.8 percent of all households with televisions watched the episode. This was a 42 percent increase in viewership from the previous episode, which was seen by an estimated 1.01 million household viewers with a 0.5 in the 18–49 demographics.

=== Critical reviews ===
"Can I Have a Mother" received mostly positive reviews from critics. Alan Sepinwall of HitFix called the episode "particularly strong", and praised the episode's exploration on Frank: "Frank is a drunken, selfish sleaze, but he didn't turn out that way by accident, and watching Frank try time and again to win his mother's approval (or, failing that, to outscheme her) made me feel for the guy for one of the few times in the history of the series."

Tim Basham of Paste gave the episode an 8.3 out of 10; Basham praised Louise Fletcher's performance, describing the fight between Peggy and Sheila as "award-winning work, especially for Fletcher, who deserves something else for her mantle." Kevin Fitzpatrick of TV Overmind wrote, "'Can I Have a Mother' isn't quite as rife with humor as some other Shameless episodes we're used to, but sets up enough for the second half of a season to be a very strong outing." Fitzpatrick praised the expansion of Sheila's character, writing "I'm continually impressed with the way Shameless' writing manages to make the character blissfully compliant, but capable of great strength."

Leigh Raines of TV Fanatic gave the episode a perfect 5 star rating out of 5, commending Joan Cusack's performance as Sheila: "Joan Cusack went balls to the wall with that wedding toast and it was phenomenal. I'd say it's the best we've ever seen her character." Kelsea Stahler of Hollywood.com wrote, "The sixth episode of Shameless' sophomore season proves one thing: it's all our parents' faults."

Joshua Alston of The A.V. Club was largely negative in his review, writing "what an uneven season of Shameless this is shaping up to me. [...] I really dug "Father's Day," and I was hoping for some continued momentum. But "Can I Have A Mother" represents the opposite of momentum. It is, at the very least, a speed bump." Alston criticized the writing, calling it "almost entirely free of the acidic wit Shameless is known for", as well as the reintroduction of Peggy's character: "The reintroduction of Peggy feels like a poor facsimile of Monica's bracing return in season one. The only character really struggling to adjust to her return is Frank, and while I understand Frank's utility, that's not the same as being emotionally invested in the character." Alston ultimately gave the episode a "C-" grade.

=== Accolades ===
For the episode, Joan Cusack received a nomination for Outstanding Guest Actress in a Drama Series at the 64th Primetime Emmy Awards. She would lose to Martha Plimpton for The Good Wife.
