= I'll Light a Candle for You Every Day =

- Shameless episode
- Episode no.: Season 2 Episode 3
- Directed by: Craig Zisk
- Written by: Nancy M. Pimental
- Cinematography by: Rodney Charters
- Editing by: Regis Kimble
- Production code: 2J5953
- Original release date: January 22, 2012
- Running time: 47 minutes

Guest appearances
- Molly Price as Dottie; Madison Davenport as Ethel; Zach McGowan as Jody; Taylor Kinney as Craig Heisner; Peter Murnik as Kirk McNally; Dennis Boutsikaris as Professor Hearst; Jack Carter as Stan; Jim Hoffmaster as Kermit; Mageina Tovah as Kim Furtado; Kerry O'Malley as Kate

Episode chronology
← Previous "Summer Loving"	Next → "A Beautiful Mess"
- Shameless season 2

"I'll Light a Candle for You Every Day" is the third episode of the second season of the American television comedy drama Shameless, an adaptation of the British series of the same name. It is the 15th overall episode of the series and was written by supervising producer Nancy M. Pimental, and directed by Craig Zisk. It originally aired on Showtime on January 22, 2012.

The series is set on the South Side of Chicago, Illinois, and depicts the poor, dysfunctional family of Frank Gallagher, a neglectful single father of six: Fiona, Phillip, Ian, Debbie, Carl, and Liam. He spends his days drunk, high, or in search of money, while his children need to learn to take care of themselves. In the episode, Frank tries everything to get Dottie's money, while Fiona reconnects with her high school crush.

According to Nielsen Media Research, the episode was seen by an estimated 1.28 million household viewers and gained a 0.7 ratings share among adults aged 18–49. The episode received critical acclaim, who praised the episode's dark nature, writing and ending.

== Plot ==
Fiona reconnects with Craig Heisner, her high school crush who is now married. After meeting with him, Fiona considers if she should go forward in a new relationship. While riding the "L" train home, she finds an abandoned purse with $500 in it, and decides to spend the money on food and groceries. After seeing Harry's corpse, Debbie starts to think of death, worrying her siblings. Kevin considers buying the Alibi from the owner, Stan, an idea that Veronica doubts over its prospects.

Frank starts to consider what to do in his plan with Dottie. To get her money, Frank steals an engagement ring that Jody was planning to give to Karen. He then proposes to marry Dottie, promising to keep her memory alive after she dies; Dottie accepts the proposal. While she is in the shower, her heart transplant pager suddenly beeps; Frank intercepts the page, telling the hospital that Dottie had already passed. Lip continues assisting Professor Hearst at the university, while also helping Ian with his West Point plans. However, he is upset when Karen says she wants to end their sexual relationship, as she is in love with Jody and is certain he will propose to her.

After discovering that the donor's heart was given to someone else, a depressed Dottie thanks Frank for taking care of her, and asks him to assist her in euthanasia by paying him $2,000; she will have sex with him, knowing she will die. Frank reluctantly agrees and the two have sex, causing Dottie's heart to explode, after which Frank takes the money and the ring. Nevertheless, he is left distraught by Dottie's death and gives the ring back to Jody, who proposes to an enthusiastic Karen. Feeling guilty for spending most of the money, Fiona collects the $500 to return to the purse's owner. However, she ultimately keeps the money when the owner insults her for living on the South Side. Reeling from the encounter, Fiona meets up with Craig to go on a date, but is left disappointed after having sex in his car. On the way home, she briefly decides to call Steve. That night, Frank goes to a church to light a candle in Dottie's honor, and seizes the opportunity to steal the church's donation money.

== Production ==
The episode was written by supervising producer Nancy M. Pimental, and directed by Craig Zisk. It was Pimental's fourth writing credit, and Zisk's first directing credit.

== Reception ==
=== Viewers ===
In its original American broadcast, "I'll Light a Candle for You Every Day" was seen by an estimated 1.28 million household viewers with a 0.7 in the 18–49 demographics. This means that 0.7 percent of all households with televisions watched the episode. This was a slight increase in viewership from the previous episode, which was seen by an estimated 1.25 million household viewers with a 0.7 in the 18–49 demographics.

=== Critical reviews ===
"I'll Light a Candle for You Every Day" received critical acclaim. Joshua Alston of The A.V. Club gave the episode an "A–" grade and wrote, "Now that's more like it, Shameless. As my reviews and their accompanying grades have indicated, I was underwhelmed with the start of this season, and concerned by what seemed like a lackadaisical pace, a dearth of engaging threads, and of course, the Frank Problem. But I adopted a wait-and-see attitude because it's nearly impossible to tell from one episode to the next whether Shameless is building up to something or the writers are just doing playful riffs on the Gallagher world that are intended to stand alone."

Alan Sepinwall of HitFix wrote, "Though I think the writing for Frank has on the whole been much better this season, I still don't find him especially funny and therefore was mostly appalled by his actions. I don't know that it was the wrong choice, story-wise, as it would be hard for me to have a lower opinion of Frank, but I'm curious how other people reacted to it."

Tim Basham of Paste gave the episode an 8.5 out of 10 and wrote, "Of course, he cannot resist stealing the offering box on his way out, proving again how Shameless entertains while serving as an exaggerated reflection of the average person's convenient sense of morality." Kevin Fitzpatrick of TV Overmind wrote, "overall 'I'll Light A Candle For You Every Day' left me feeling somewhat cold. It's not that the exploits of the Gallaghers aren't entertaining in their own right, but I'm hoping as the season goes on the stories become more personal and less 'outrageous.'"

Leigh Raines of TV Fanatic gave the episode a 4 star rating out of 5 and wrote, "The basis of Shameless is that the Gallaghers put the fun in dysfunction. But "I'll Light a Candle for You Every Day" took their dysfunctional antics to a whole new low, while simultaneously showing us a rare remorseful side of the family." Kelsea Stahler of Hollywood.com wrote, "This week, Shameless explores just how much of a downward spiral they can put Fiona in. Even with his constant scheming, Frank's scenes are less scandalizing – but then again we expect him to do awful things."
