= Father's Day (Shameless) =

- Shameless episode
- Episode no.: Season 2 Episode 5
- Directed by: Anthony Hemingway
- Written by: Etan Frankel
- Cinematography by: Rodney Charters
- Editing by: Regis Kimble
- Production code: 2J5955
- Original release date: February 5, 2012
- Running time: 53 minutes

Guest appearances
- Joan Cusack as Sheila Jackson; Madison Davenport as Ethel; Zach McGowan as Jody; Emma Greenwell as Mandy Milkovich; Peter Murnik as Colonel Kirk McNally; Johnny Sneed as Richard; Karina Logue as Detective; Dove Cameron as Holly Herkimer; Dennis Cockrum as Terry Milkovich; Nicky Korba as Little Hank; Robert Gant as Greg Garvin

Episode chronology
← Previous "A Beautiful Mess"	Next → "Can I Have a Mother"
- Shameless season 2

"Father's Day" is the fifth episode of the second season of the American television comedy drama Shameless, an adaptation of the British series of the same name. It is the 17th overall episode of the series and was written by co-producer Etan Frankel, and directed by Anthony Hemingway. It originally aired on Showtime on February 5, 2012.

The series is set on the South Side of Chicago, Illinois, and depicts the poor, dysfunctional family of Frank Gallagher, a neglectful single father of six: Fiona, Phillip, Ian, Debbie, Carl, and Liam. He spends his days drunk, high, or in search of money, while his children need to learn to take care of themselves. In the episode, Eddie Jackson's body is found and Frank is deemed a prime suspect in his death, while Veronica suspects Kevin is cheating on her.

According to Nielsen Media Research, the episode was seen by an estimated 1.01 million household viewers and gained a 0.5 ratings share among adults aged 18–49. The episode received mostly positive reviews from critics, who praised the storylines, character development and performances.

== Plot ==
Eddie Jackson's corpse is found by a yacht in Lake Michigan. Sheila is shaken by the revelation, but Frank views this as an opportunity to collect Eddie's life insurance benefits and pension. As he celebrates in the Alibi, Kevin informs Frank he is a prime suspect in his death, as Eddie threatened him in the bar before his disappearance.

At the Gallagher household, Carl decides to lend Frank's room to a prostitute named Beverly for money, although Fiona is worried that she wanders naked through the house and is accepting clients into the house. Fiona and Lip have a discussion about Karen's pregnancy; Fiona reiterates that she's not taking care of another kid. Needing an alibi, Frank asks Terry Milkovich for help; Terry promises to get the needed evidence to corroborate Frank's innocence, but he wants $1,500. Frank is detained by the police, and he believes it is because of Eddie's death. However, Frank discovers he is actually being arrested for Karen's Daddyz Girl video, and he faces thirty years for sexual assault of a minor. Karen provides an alibi for Frank, telling the authorities he did not consent; Frank is ultimately released, although the detective promises she will catch Frank eventually.

Fiona attends a ritzy wedding with Richard but lies about her background, telling Richard that she went to Princeton. One of Richard's friends, Greg, immediately suspects Fiona is a prostitute and mocks her. Fiona admits that she lied about her background and storms out, only to be consoled by Richard, who explains he is aware of his background but is still interested in being friends with her. Veronica suspects Kevin is having an affair, as he has been lying over his whereabouts. She follows him to a tenement building, where she sees him meeting with a woman. Later, she threatens him into revealing his encounters, and he reveals he was learning how to read. She does not believe it, until she visits the woman to corroborate. Kevin explains he was trying to impress her with a romantic anniversary for themselves, and they reconcile. Meanwhile, Ethel opens up to Malik about her rape by her husband Clyde; Malik gets his father, also in prison, to stab Clyde.

Ian meets with Colonel Kirk McNally, a United States Department of Defense representative, hoping to be enrolled into West Point. However, he is heartbroken when he realizes McNally wants Lip instead for his intellect. Lip and Ian then get into a brutal fight, with Ian reaffirming he will get into West Point without his help. Lip is also shaken when he discovers Karen and Jody already married, and insults their planned life together. Richard takes Fiona home, and they make arrangements to dine later. After he leaves, Steve appears, surprising Fiona. At the cemetery, Karen urinates on Eddie's gravestone.

== Production ==
The episode was written by co-producer Etan Frankel, and directed by Anthony Hemingway. It was Frankel's second writing credit, and Hemingway's first directing credit.

== Reception ==
=== Viewers ===
In its original American broadcast, "Father's Day" was seen by an estimated 1.01 million household viewers with a 0.5 in the 18–49 demographics. This means that 0.5 percent of all households with televisions watched the episode. This was a 27% decrease in viewership from the previous episode, which was seen by an estimated 1.37 million household viewers with a 0.7 in the 18–49 demographics.

=== Critical reviews ===
"Father's Day" received mostly positive reviews from critics. Joshua Alston of The A.V. Club gave the episode a "B+" grade and wrote, "The world of Shameless is a large one, what with the Gallaghers themselves, their co-conspirators, and their romantic entanglements, so the temptation to turn it into an equal-opportunity ensemble show is an understandable one. But it really clicks together when Fiona is at the center of the universe. Any episode that pushes Fiona to the fore is automatically going to appeal to me, and "Father's Day" definitely did that, but it also successfully braided together some hanging threads and renewed the interest in some characters and storylines that had started to wane."

Kevin Fitzpatrick of TV Overmind wrote, "last week's Shameless, or the seemingly monumental development of having Justin Chatwin officially return as 'Steve,' but that really wasn't what 'Fathers Day' was all about."

Leigh Raines of TV Fanatic gave the episode a 4 star rating out of 5 and wrote, "You know that feeling when you see the one person you never expected to see and your heart just falls into your stomach and you go momentarily mute? For some reason, that moment shocked me more than all of the other insane stuff Shameless delivers week after week." Kelsea Stahler of Hollywood.com wrote, "Well, we certainly can't accuse this week's Shameless of being boring. We find a dead body, a hooker living at Chez Gallagher, a potentially-cheating Kevin, Frank in handcuffs, some seriously below the belt prison violence, Fiona's rich girl charade and of course, the return of Steve. And even with all these ambling storylines intersecting, the series still manages to give each aspect weight."
