= A Beautiful Mess =

- Shameless episode
- Episode no.: Season 2 Episode 4
- Directed by: Mark Mylod
- Written by: Alex Borstein
- Cinematography by: Rodney Charters
- Editing by: Shannon Mitchell
- Production code: 2J5954
- Original release date: January 29, 2012
- Running time: 53 minutes

Guest appearances
- Joan Cusack as Sheila Jackson; James Wolk as Adam Lange; Madison Davenport as Ethel; Noel Fisher as Mickey Milkovich; Zach McGowan as Jody; Emma Greenwell as Mandy Milkovich; Taylor Kinney as Craig Heisner; Brit Morgan as Lucy Heisner; Nicky Korba as Little Hank; Zayne Emory as Simon; Dove Cameron as Holly Herkimer; Amy Smart as Jasmine Hollander

Episode chronology
← Previous "I'll Light a Candle for You Every Day"	Next → "Father's Day"
- Shameless season 2

"A Beautiful Mess" is the fourth episode of the second season of the American television comedy drama Shameless, an adaptation of the British series of the same name. It is the 16th overall episode of the series and was written by consulting producer Alex Borstein, and directed by co-executive producer Mark Mylod. It originally aired on Showtime on January 29, 2012.

The series is set on the South Side of Chicago, Illinois, and depicts the poor, dysfunctional family of Frank Gallagher, a neglectful single father of six: Fiona, Phillip, Ian, Debbie, Carl, and Liam. He spends his days drunk, high, or in search of money, while his children need to learn to take care of themselves. In the episode, Frank realizes his days at the Jackson household are numbered, while Debbie hosts a slumber party for her friends.

According to Nielsen Media Research, the episode was seen by an estimated 1.37 million household viewers and gained a 0.7 ratings share among adults aged 18–49. The episode received mostly positive reviews from critics, who praised the performances, storylines and ending.

== Plot ==
A woman named Lucy arrives at the Gallagher house with a baby, wanting to talk to Fiona. When Fiona meets her, Lucy slaps her and chases her through the neighborhood, revealing she is Craig's wife. She is forced to flee to Sheila's house, where she reprimands Craig through a phone message.

Debbie is overwhelmed with daycare business, and the stress manifests itself into an intense rash. Worrying that she's putting too much stress on the kids, Fiona forces Debbie to throw a slumber party for fun. Debbie develops a crush on Carl's friend, Little Hank, and invites him. She also decides to invite Holly, a 14-year-old still stuck in fourth grade, who only agrees to attend because of Lip. Ethel bonds with Malik, a teenage father on Kevin's youth basketball team. While Kevin is fine with her decision, Veronica fears for her safety. Frank is scared by Sheila progressing in curing her agoraphobia. When she reveals she wants to visit the Alibi, Frank realizes his days might be numbered.

Lip has sex with Mandy, and upon realizing she will sleep with anyone, gets her to try to seduce Jody. Debbie's slumber party proves to be underwhelming, as Little Hank rejects her advances, preferring to flirt with Holly. At night, Holly tries to sleep with Lip, who refuses her advances. Angry, she storms out of the party, prompting others to leave as well, devastating Debbie. This is witnessed by Fiona, who was arriving from a date with Adam. The following morning, Craig and Lucy arrive at the Gallagher house, where Craig apologizes to Fiona for her actions, causing her to isolate herself in the bathroom and cry. Later, Karen arrives and attacks Lip for trying to ruin her relationship with Jody. As she leaves, she reveals she is pregnant in front of the Gallaghers. As Sheila prepares to walk to the Alibi, an airplane's wheel crashes right in front of her. This causes her to panic and return home, to Frank's delight.

== Production ==
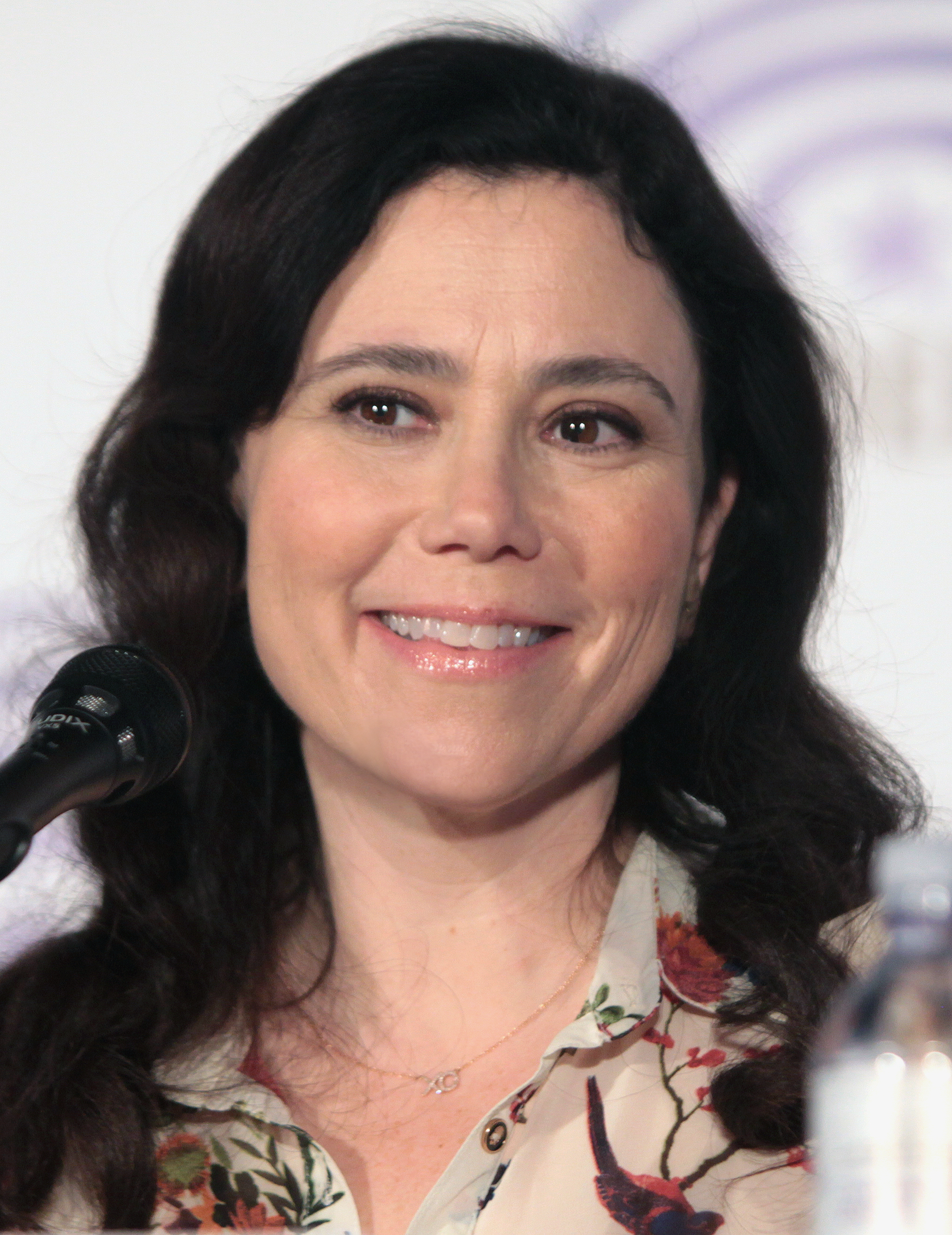
The episode was written by Alex Borstein.

The episode was written by consulting producer Alex Borstein, and directed by co-executive producer Mark Mylod. It was Borstein's third writing credit, and Mylod's fifth directing credit.

== Reception ==
=== Viewers ===
In its original American broadcast, "A Beautiful Mess" was seen by an estimated 1.37 million household viewers with a 0.7 in the 18–49 demographics. This means that 0.7 percent of all households with televisions watched the episode. This was a 7% increase in viewership from the previous episode, which was seen by an estimated 1.28 million household viewers with a 0.7 in the 18–49 demographics.

=== Critical reviews ===
"A Beautiful Mess" received mostly positive reviews from critics. Joshua Alston of The A.V. Club gave the episode a "B" grade and wrote, "so much of the episode didn't quite work for me. It was a totally decent episode of Shameless — somewhere in the middle of the pack, I'd say. But so many elements of it were off by just a few degrees that it didn't add up to a great episode. The balance of these episodes has to be precisely calibrated such that their outlandishness is tempered with credible, human moments." Alston disliked the "overly broad" conflict between Fiona and Craig's wife, calling it "the most disappointing element of the episode."

Tim Basham of Paste gave the episode an 8.1 out of 10 and wrote, "Comedy thrives on the unexpected, those times when every day life collides with sudden change. And Shameless thrives on such changes." Basham praised the chemistry between Macy and Cusack, as well as Emma Kenney's performance as Debbie, writing "As Debbie's role in the series expands, so does her talent. This half-pint can act." Kevin Fitzpatrick of TV Overmind wrote, "'A Beautiful Mess' does a strong job in highlighting the ways in which the Gallagher children fall into behavorial habits of their father, Fiona most visibly, but it'll be interesting to see going forward what Lip does with Karen's revelation and ultimatum to stay away. At its best, Shameless is silly, saucy and bittersweet and so far this season seems to be (mostly) on track."

Leigh Raines of TV Fanatic gave the episode a 4.5 star rating out of 5 and wrote, "Just when you think Karen can't shock you anymore, she goes and drops that bomb! In "A Beautiful Mess," we found out why this character would be so quick to jump into a marriage with a guy she barely knows and barely seems to care about, the often naked Jody." Kelsea Stahler of Hollywood.com wrote, "the Gallagher clan is rife with richness – so much so, that we're almost overwhelmed on a weekly basis. But as an avid television viewer, a surplus of dense characters is a great problem to have."
