= A Bottle of Jean Nate =

- Shameless episode
- Episode no.: Season 2 Episode 7
- Directed by: David Nutter
- Written by: Nancy M. Pimental
- Cinematography by: Rodney Charters
- Editing by: Shannon Mitchell; Jeffrey M. Werner
- Production code: 2J5957
- Original release date: February 19, 2012
- Running time: 48 minutes

Guest appearances
- Zach McGowan as Jody; Stephanie Fantauzzi as Estefania; Gwen McGee as Officer Rodriguez; Rakefet Abergel as Lisa; Gloria Garayua as Laurie; Jack Carter as Stan; Amy Smart as Jasmine Hollander; Louise Fletcher as Peggy Gallagher

Episode chronology
← Previous "Can I Have a Mother"	Next → "Parenthood"
- Shameless season 2

"A Bottle of Jean Nate" is the seventh episode of the second season of the American television comedy drama Shameless, an adaptation of the British series of the same name. It is the 19th overall episode of the series and was written by supervising producer Nancy M. Pimental, and directed by David Nutter. It originally aired on Showtime on February 19, 2012.

The series is set on the South Side of Chicago, Illinois, and depicts the poor, dysfunctional family of Frank Gallagher, a neglectful single father of six: Fiona, Phillip, Ian, Debbie, Carl, and Liam. He spends his days drunk, high, or in search of money, while his children need to learn to take care of themselves. In the episode, Fiona goes on a yacht party with Jasmine, while Karen reconsiders her marriage.

According to Nielsen Media Research, the episode was seen by an estimated 1.41 million household viewers and gained a 0.8 ratings share among adults aged 18–49. The episode received highly positive reviews from critics, who praised the revelations and performances.

== Plot ==
Fiona is surprised when Jasmine wakes her up in her house. Jasmine invites her to a party she is hosting on David's boat, and Fiona considers going. The Gallaghers are also annoyed that Peggy is now staying with them, but they have no way in getting her to leave. At the house, Peggy bonds with Carl and gets him involved in a homemade meth lab. Reeling from Ethel's sudden departure, Kevin and Veronica come to realize that they want to have a baby. Kevin grows worried over Stan living alone at the Alibi, and he takes Stan to live at a nursery home.

Karen grows disillusioned with her life with Jody. Despite having broken up with Lip, she continues hanging out with him as she considers new alternatives in her marriage. Under Lip's advice, she manages to get Jody to sign a prenuptial agreement, with Jody unaware of its content. Later, Karen gets angry during sex and surprises Jody by kicking him out of the house. Lip and Ian continue avoiding each other, until Ian realizes that Lip is still seeing Karen and mocks him for trying to ruin his life. Before their fight escalates any further, Peggy interrupts them, suggesting they should solve their problems by having a fist fight. Lip and Ian agree to fight underneath the "L" train, although neither ends up winning; both finally express their frustration with each other and reconcile.

Fiona, Kevin and Veronica arrive at Jasmine's yacht party. However, Fiona is upset to see Steve and Estefania (Stephanie Fantauzzi) as guests, something that Jasmine was aware of. Fiona confronts Steve over his double life; Steve admits that he was planning to tell her but never got the chance to. Afterwards, Jasmine consoles an emotional Fiona and kisses her, professing her love for her. Stunned, Fiona thanks Jasmine for the party and leaves.

The following day, Peggy and Carl's meth lab explodes in the basement. When Fiona discovers Carl's involvement, she unites with Frank to get rid of his mother. Peggy is picked up by the paramedics after fainting at a hardware store; Fiona and Frank are informed that Peggy has terminal cancer. After Jasmine is kicked off David's boat, she reveals that she is homeless and asks Fiona if she can stay at the Gallagher home. When Fiona refuses, Jasmine angrily ends their friendship. Steve arrives at the Gallagher house and proclaims to Fiona that he loves her; she rebuffs him again and walks off.

== Production ==
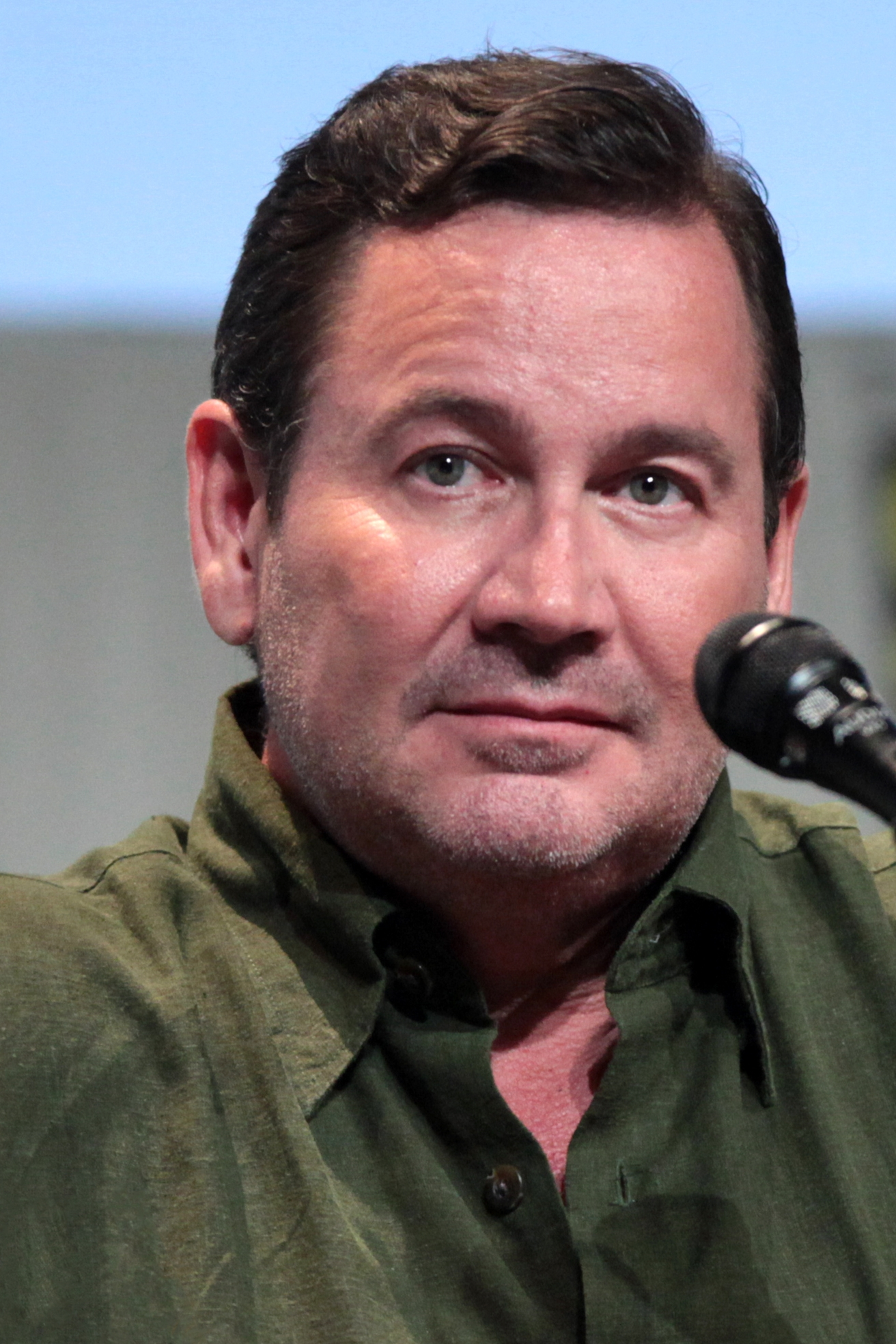
The episode was directed by David Nutter.

The episode was written by supervising producer Nancy M. Pimental, and directed by David Nutter. It was Pimental's fifth writing credit, and Nutter's second directing credit.

== Reception ==
=== Viewers ===
In its original American broadcast, "A Bottle of Jean Nate" was seen by an estimated 1.41 million household viewers with a 0.8 in the 18–49 demographics. This means that 0.8 percent of all households with televisions watched the episode. This was a slight decrease in viewership from the previous episode, which was seen by an estimated 1.44 million household viewers with a 0.8 in the 18–49 demographics.

=== Critical reviews ===
"A Bottle of Jean Nate" received highly positive reviews from critics. Joshua Alston of The A.V. Club gave a positive review, considering it an improvement over the previous episode, and praised the episode's exploration of Frank and Fiona's relationship: "What I love about the Frank and Fiona dynamic this year is that more often than not, Fiona is in a space of acceptance, rather than the constant state of (totally valid) resentment we saw in season one." Alston ultimately gave the episode an "A-" grade, concluding "This was a deeply sad episode, and there was plenty of misery to go around, but it didn't feel miserable. It was a bittersweet end to another crazy Gallagher summer."

Tim Basham of Paste gave the episode a 7.3 out of 10 and wrote, "Through all of the bad times, and all of the family in-fighting the Gallaghers eventually stand together when threatened. Their love may be twisted, but it can never be denied." Leigh Raines of TV Fanatic gave the episode a 4.5 star rating out of 5 and wrote, "Grammy Gallagher blew us away on last week's five star episode of Shameless. In the latest installment, [...] Grammy continued to stun us with her shifty ways."
