= Hurricane Monica (Shameless) =

- Shameless episode
- Episode no.: Season 2 Episode 9
- Directed by: Alex Graves
- Written by: Alex Borstein
- Cinematography by: Rodney Charters
- Editing by: Kelley Dixon
- Production code: 2J5959
- Original release date: March 11, 2012
- Running time: 51 minutes

Guest appearances
- Joan Cusack as Sheila Jackson; Chloe Webb as Monica Gallagher; Zach McGowan as Jody; Stephanie Fantauzzi as Estefania; Emma Greenwell as Mandy Milkovich; Dennis Boutsikaris as Professor Hearst; Dennis Cockrum as Terry Milkovich; Nicky Korba as Little Hank; Desean Terry as Ron; Carlease Burke as Roberta; David Wells as Father Pete; Candace Brown as Alana Murphy; Micah Cohen as Jeff Murphy

Episode chronology
← Previous "Parenthood"	Next → "A Great Cause"
- Shameless season 2

"Hurricane Monica" is the ninth episode of the second season of the American television comedy drama Shameless, an adaptation of the British series of the same name. It is the 21st overall episode of the series and was written by consulting producer Alex Borstein, and directed by Alex Graves. It originally aired on Showtime on March 11, 2012.

The series is set on the South Side of Chicago, Illinois, and depicts the poor, dysfunctional family of Frank Gallagher, a neglectful single father of six: Fiona, Phillip, Ian, Debbie, Carl, and Liam. He spends his days drunk, high, or in search of money, while his children need to learn to take care of themselves. In the episode, Monica stays with the Gallaghers to help Frank, while Lip tries to find a place to stay.

According to Nielsen Media Research, the episode was seen by an estimated 1.31 million household viewers and gained a 0.7 ratings share among adults aged 18–49. The episode received critical acclaim, with critics praising the storylines, performances, and directing.

== Plot ==
The Gallaghers learn of Peggy's death and are surprised to discover Monica now staying with them. Monica is helping Frank in grieving his mother, but the siblings wonder if she will stay for good. Monica also has sex with Frank, after revealing that her relationship with Roberta has ended.

Lip moves in with Karen, but furiously leaves when she says Sheila wants him to pay rent. He then goes with Kevin and Veronica; while Kevin is willing to let him stay, Veronica refuses. He convinces Steve in letting him stay by being part of his business. While lounging in Steve's apartment, Lip hears Estefania having phone sex with a man named Marco; he later informs Steve. Frank breaks into Sheila's house, eager to reclaim the cash he believes Peggy has hidden. This causes Sheila to believe her house is haunted, unaware that Frank is making the noises. She asks Jody for help, and they in turn hire a priest for advice. After attempting to perform a séance, Sheila apologizes to Jody for Karen's behavior and they kiss; Karen later returns home and overhears her mother and Jody having sex.

Monica tries to connect with her kids, attending Carl's football games and thanking Fiona for raising the kids in her absence. After learning of his homosexuality, Monica decides to take Ian to a gay club, and wins him over with her genuine sympathy over his recent break-up with Mickey. Meanwhile, Frank talks with Jody over the money and is furious when he discovers Peggy gave it to his other brothers instead. The Gallaghers throw a party, where Monica dances joyfully with her children. The following morning, Monica pays for Peggy's ashes, and Frank uses it for his cigarette. Terry Milkovich suddenly breaks into the house and attacks Ian, revealing that Mandy is pregnant.

== Production ==
=== Development ===
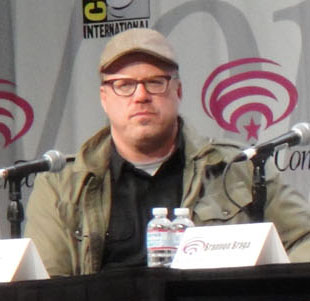
The episode was directed by Alex Graves.

The episode was written by consulting producer Alex Borstein, and directed by Alex Graves. It was Borstein's fourth writing credit, and Graves' first directing credit.

=== Writing ===
Jeremy Allen White previewed the episode, "Monica comes back, and Lip is incredibly distraught about it. He really feels like he's been kicked out even though he was given some kind of ultimatum. In Lip's eyes, Fiona kicked him out of the house. The next time he sees all of them, Monica's there. So it's another smack in the face. Not only am I kicked out, but now our mother, who abandoned us, is back. [Monica] will be spiraling more and more out of control. She puts the whole family in jeopardy."

== Reception ==
=== Viewers ===
In its original American broadcast, "Hurricane Monica" was seen by an estimated 1.31 million household viewers with a 0.7 in the 18–49 demographics. This means that 0.7 percent of all households with televisions watched the episode. This was a 19% decrease in viewership from the previous episode, which was seen by an estimated 1.60 million household viewers with a 0.8 in the 18–49 demographics.

=== Critical reviews ===
"Hurricane Monica" received critical acclaim. Joshua Alston of The A.V. Club gave the episode an "A–" grade, calling the episode "fantastic" and praising the episode's focus on Monica: "I'm trying to think of a recurring character that has more of a talismanic effect on a show than Monica does on Shameless. In last season's "But At Last Came A Knock," Chloe Webb sauntered in and suddenly everything with Shameless just clicked into place. And so it was with "Hurricane Monica," in which the Gallagher matriarch pops up yet again and brings out everyone's extremes." Alston lauded Chloe Webb's performance as Monica, writing "I can't say enough good things about Chloe Webb's performance. She absolutely owns this character."

Tim Basham of Paste wrote about the episode, "Monica's return to the Gallagher household, though unexpected, comes with some guarded acceptance from her children, whom she had abandoned years earlier." Leigh Raines of TV Fanatic gave the episode a perfect 5 star rating out of 5 and wrote, "Overall this episode was more of a rollercoaster than a hurricane. Everyone was all over the place, several different storylines were running, but the Gallaghers know how to make chaos work. Now that Monica is back and Mandy's pregnant, we're sure to see things get even crazier."
