= Parenthood (Shameless) =

- Shameless episode
- Episode no.: Season 2 Episode 8
- Directed by: Daisy von Scherler Mayer
- Written by: Mike O'Malley
- Cinematography by: Rodney Charters
- Editing by: Regis Kimble
- Production code: 2J5958
- Original release date: March 4, 2012
- Running time: 54 minutes

Guest appearances
- Joan Cusack as Sheila Jackson; Zach McGowan as Jody; Stephanie Fantauzzi as Estefania; Noel Fisher as Mickey Milkovich; Chloe Webb as Monica Gallagher; Ed Lauter as Dick Healey; Susan Krebs as Catholic Adoption Lady; Larry Clarke as Timothy; Diora Baird as Meg; Joe Adler as Colin Milkovich; J. Michael Trautmann as Iggy Milkovich; Del Hunter-White as School Administrator; Louise Fletcher as Peggy Gallagher

Episode chronology
| ← Previous "A Bottle of Jean Nate" | Next → "Hurricane Monica" |
- Shameless season 2

"Parenthood" is the eighth episode of the second season of the American television comedy drama Shameless, an adaptation of the British series of the same name. It is the 20th overall episode of the series and was written by consulting producer Mike O'Malley, and directed by Daisy von Scherler Mayer. It originally aired on Showtime on March 4, 2012.

The series is set on the South Side of Chicago, Illinois, and depicts the poor, dysfunctional family of Frank Gallagher, a neglectful single father of six: Fiona, Phillip, Ian, Debbie, Carl, and Liam. He spends his days drunk, high, or in search of money, while his children need to learn to take care of themselves. In the episode, Frank must take care of his mother as her condition worsens, while Mickey plans to kill Frank after he witnesses him and Ian having sex.

According to Nielsen Media Research, the episode was seen by an estimated 1.60 million household viewers and gained a 0.8 ratings share among adults aged 18–49. The episode received highly positive reviews from critics, who praised the closure to Peggy Gallagher's arc and performances.

== Plot ==
Frank continues taking care of Peggy, rotating from staying at his house and with Sheila. While buying medicine for his mother, Frank goes to the store and catches Ian and Mickey having sex in the freezer. Despite their horror, Frank is not annoyed and leaves with the supplies and some money from the cash register.

Now back with Karen, Lip wants to quit school to focus on becoming a father, but Fiona tells him that if he reconsiders, she'll go back and get her GED. However, Karen surprises Lip by announcing she wants to give her baby up for adoption, feeling she would be an unfit mother. They go to different adoption agencies, but Karen seems more concerned about the money than her baby's future. This leads to an argument, wherein Karen reminds Lip that he is not confirmed to be the baby's father. In an attempt to get closer to Fiona, Steve volunteers to be Carl's football coach, much to Fiona's dismay. Meanwhile, Mickey decides to kill Frank, as he fears he will expose his homosexuality and face the wrath of his father. Ian tries to comfort him, but Mickey makes it clear they are not a couple. Mickey and his gang ultimately prepare to ambush Frank in the street, but Mickey is unable to go forward with the plan. Instead, he approaches a nearby police officer and punches him, violating his parole and allowing him to get sent back to prison.

Upset by Karen's decision, Lip insults a teacher and breaks a window, getting himself expelled. Fiona is informed about this by Lip's guidance counsellor, but discovers Lip is still being offered a chance to prove himself at another school. When Lip makes it clear he will not go back to school, Fiona gives him an ultimatum to either return to school or leave the house, prompting Lip to move out. Sheila and Jody take care of Peggy as her condition starts to worsen. Sheila and Peggy reconcile in the process, and Peggy reveals her intentions to send money to each of Frank's brothers; however, she refuses to give any to Frank. Wanting to hasten her own death, Peggy convinces Sheila to smother her with a pillow. After being informed of his mother's death, an emotional Frank visits Monica, crying that his mother died.

== Production ==
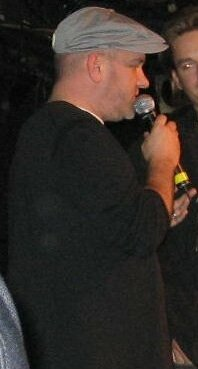
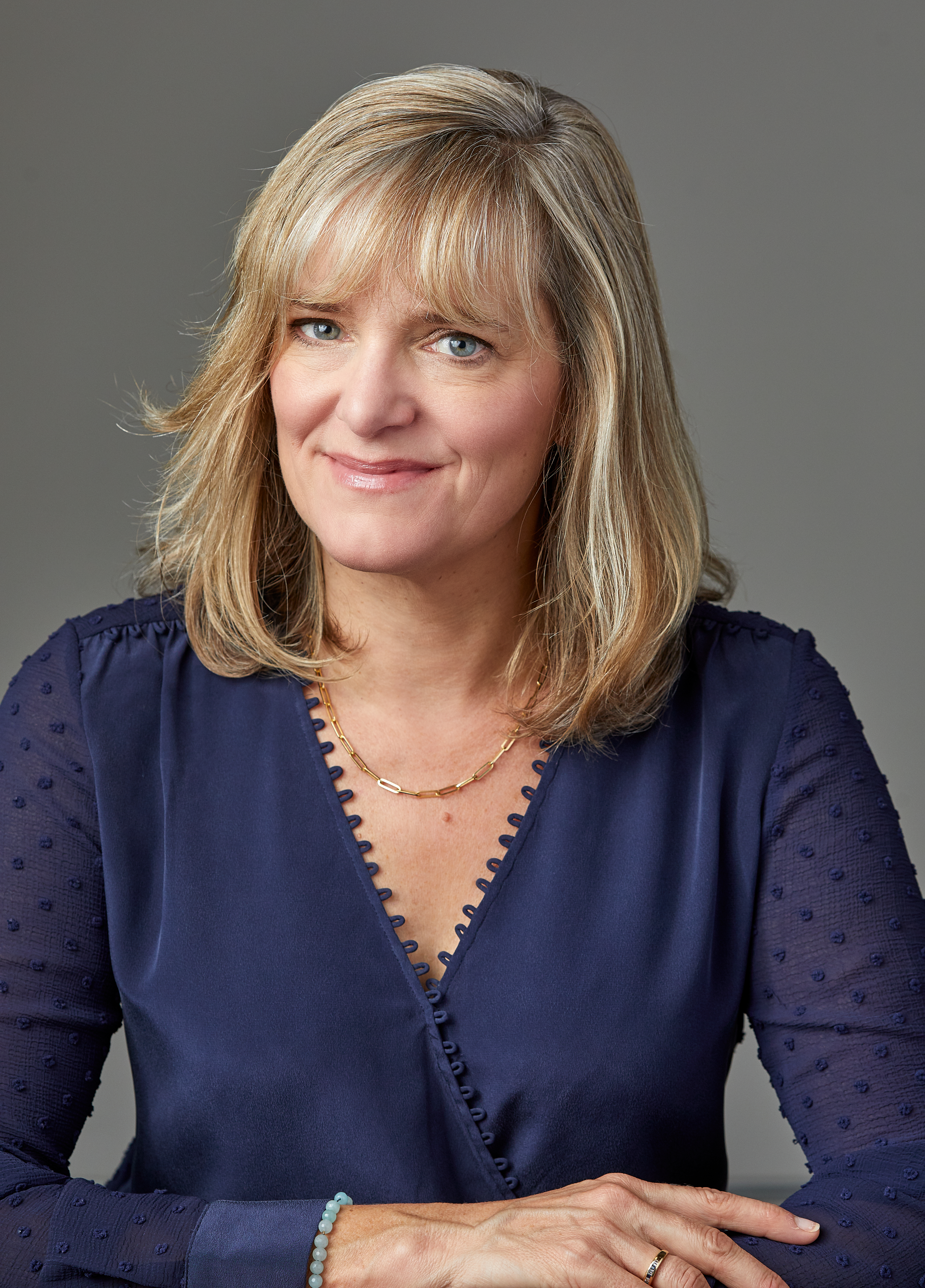
The episode was written by Mike O'Malley (left) and directed by Daisy von Scherler Mayer (right).

The episode was written by consulting producer Mike O'Malley, and directed by Daisy von Scherler Mayer. It was O'Malley's third writing credit, and von Scherler Mayer's first directing credit.

== Reception ==
=== Viewers ===
In its original American broadcast, "Parenthood" was seen by an estimated 1.60 million household viewers with a 0.8 in the 18–49 demographics. This means that 0.8 percent of all households with televisions watched the episode. This was a 13 percent increase in viewership from the previous episode, which was seen by an estimated 1.41 million household viewers with a 0.8 in the 18–49 demographics.

=== Critical reviews ===
"Parenthood" received positive reviews from critics. Joshua Alston of The A.V. Club gave the episode a "B+" grade and praised Fletcher's portrayal as Peggy: "Kudos to Louise Fletcher who has done consistently terrific work as Peggy, but she was especially awesome tonight as Peggy decided she wanted to end her suffering and choose to die." However, Alston criticized the pacing of the episode, believing that the show is following too many characters: "Overpopulation might be the biggest issue with Shameless at this point. That's the whole point of course: There are too many Gallaghers, too many lovers, too many entanglements, hatreds and debts. But it's becoming like Problematic Character Whack-a-Mole. Down goes Kash, up pops Estafania. A week without Jasmine is a week with Little Hank, or vice-versa."

Tim Basham of Paste gave the episode a 9.1 out of 10 and wrote, "In what is possibly the best-written episode of this series' young life, nothing is sacred. Morality, civility, ethics — they're all thrown out, but then they are all brought back, morphed into a Shameless existence with its own set of standards." Basham also praised Fletcher's portrayal of Peggy, writing "Fletcher gives an Emmy-worthy performance, and she will be missed."

Leigh Raines of TV Fanatic gave the episode a 4 star rating out of 5 and praised Cusack's performance, writing "Somehow Joan Cusack manages to outperform herself week after week." Kelsea Stahler of Hollywood.com wrote, "Shameless has a knack for throwing the wackiest, most heartfelt episodes at screenwriter Mike O'Malley."
