= Just Like the Pilgrims Intended =

- Shameless episode
- Episode no.: Season 2 Episode 11
- Directed by: Mark Mylod
- Story by: LaToya Morgan; Nancy M. Pimental
- Teleplay by: Nancy M. Pimental
- Cinematography by: Rodney Charters
- Editing by: Jeffrey M. Werner
- Production code: 2J5961
- Original release date: March 25, 2012
- Running time: 50 minutes

Guest appearances
- Joan Cusack as Sheila Jackson; Harry Hamlin as Ned; Chloe Webb as Monica Gallagher; Zach McGowan as Jody; Stephanie Fantauzzi as Estefania; Emma Greenwell as Mandy Milkovich; Kristoffer Winters as Clayton Gallagher; Joe Adler as Colin Milkovich; J. Michael Trautmann as Iggy Milkovich; Nicky Korba as Little Hank; Thierre Di Castro as Marco; William Stanford Davis as Conrad; Micah Cohen as Jeff Murphy; Candace Brown as Alana Murphy

Episode chronology
← Previous "A Great Cause"	Next → "Fiona Interrupted"
- Shameless season 2

"Just Like the Pilgrims Intended" is the eleventh episode of the second season of the American television comedy drama Shameless, an adaptation of the British series of the same name. It is the 23rd overall episode of the series and was written by supervising producer Nancy M. Pimental from a story by LaToya Morgan and Pimental, and directed by co-executive producer Mark Mylod. It originally aired on Showtime on March 25, 2012.

The series is set on the South Side of Chicago, Illinois, and depicts the poor, dysfunctional family of Frank Gallagher, a neglectful single father of six: Fiona, Phillip, Ian, Debbie, Carl, and Liam. He spends his days drunk, high, or in search of money, while his children need to learn to take care of themselves. In the episode, the Gallaghers prepare for Thanksgiving, while Lip films a movie for his future child.

According to Nielsen Media Research, the episode was seen by an estimated 1.51 million household viewers and gained a 0.8 ratings share among adults aged 18–49. The episode received generally positive reviews from critics, who praised its emotional tone, performances and ending.

== Plot ==
The Gallaghers prepare for Thanksgiving, but a depressed Monica does not want to leave her bed. Forcing her to take a shower, Frank decides to give her cocaine to lift her up. They subsequently visit Clayton to get some of Peggy's money from him, but he does not fall for Monica's seduction.

Steve picks up Marco, reuniting him with Estefania. Marco and Estefania then have sex at every possible place, annoying Steve and Lip. Upon learning that Steve was married to Estefania, Marco prepares to kill him. In response, Steve agrees to allow Marco to take his apartment and steal his identity. Lip then decides to move in with Mandy, resuming their sexual relationship. Her brothers ask Lip to take them to a liquor store, which he reluctantly agrees to. However, the visit is actually a planned robbery, with the cashier surprising the brothers by pulling a shotgun. Lip then decides to leave the car, forcing the Milkovich siblings to escape in the car themselves. Ian goes to a gay club and sleeps with an older businessman who calls himself Ned.

Karen informs Sheila that she knows about her affair with Jody, only to be surprised when her water breaks. They take her to the hospital, and Lip meets them there, having filmed a movie for when the child grows up. Meanwhile, as the Gallaghers dine for Thanksgiving, Monica excuses herself from the table; she then slits her wrists in the kitchen in a suicide attempt. As Steve tries to stop the bleeding, Frank walks out of the house. While Monica is sedated in the hospital, the family moves to Karen's room to see her baby. Karen successfully gives birth, but the family is taken aback when they see the baby is Asian and has Down syndrome. Karen refuses to hold her baby, and an upset Lip storms out after Karen reveals that the father is most likely Timmy Wong. Lip informs the adoptive parents of the baby, and they decide to not adopt him, prompting Lip to angrily leave and destroy the movie. Later that night, Sheila steals the baby and flees with Jody on a motorcycle. In the streets, a distraught Frank tries to sleep on a sidewalk.

== Production ==
=== Development ===
The episode was written by supervising producer Nancy M. Pimental from a story by LaToya Morgan and Pimental, and directed by co-executive producer Mark Mylod. It was Pimental's sixth writing credit, Morgan's first writing credit, and Mylod's sixth directing credit.

== Reception ==
=== Viewers ===
In its original American broadcast, "Just Like the Pilgrims Intended" was seen by an estimated 1.51 million household viewers with a 0.8 in the 18–49 demographics. This means that 0.8 percent of all households with televisions watched the episode. This was a 30% increase in viewership from the previous episode, which was seen by an estimated 1.16 million household viewers with a 0.6 in the 18–49 demographics.

=== Critical reviews ===
"Just Like the Pilgrims Intended" received generally positive reviews from critics. Tim Basham of Paste gave the episode an 8.9 out of 10 rating and wrote, "In what is easily the most emotional episode of the series, everything breaks loose when Karen has her baby, Monica attempts suicide, Steve goes back to being Jimmy and Carl shoots a bald eagle with an Uzi. The dichotomy between the show's heartlessness and compassion rises to a peak befitting a season-ending episode, except that it's not. Lucky for us there's one show left." Kelsea Stahler of Hollywood.com wrote, "Shameless may have woven its way into our hearts as a madcap dramedy with the capacity for kitchen floor trysts in the first episode, but it's maintained its position with an element that has a little more staying power: the familial bond."

Leigh Raines of TV Fanatic gave the episode a perfect 5 star rating out of 5 and wrote, "Just when you think Shameless can't top itself, it goes and truly blows your mind. "Just Like the Pilgrims Intended" was just another example of why you need to expect the unexpected when it comes to this drama." Dustin Rowles of HitFix wrote, "It's been a dark season, and Monica's suicide attempt reached a new level of darkness last night: Here you have a family sitting around for a nice Thanksgiving dinner, and the kids walk into the kitchen to find their mother bleeding out from her slashed wrist. Again, Frank doesn't turn into TV Dad. He doesn't save the day. He runs. He gets drunk. And he leaves a mess for his family. That's almost [too] real to stomach."

Joshua Alston's review for The A.V. Club was largely negative, criticizing the episode's storylines and lowbrow shock humor: "It seems like the writers are under the impression that by writing the most outrageous, depraved, taboo-breaking things they can come up with, they are tapping into a heightened version of what life is like for a family like the Gallaghers. But it's precisely these moments that often make this show feel so artificial." Despite enjoying some of the episode's dramatic elements, Alston believed it was "not quite enough to make up for what came before it", and ultimately gave the episode a "C" grade.
