= Shameless season 2 =

Shameless
- Season 2
- DVD cover
- Showrunner: John Wells
- Starring: William H. Macy; Emmy Rossum; Justin Chatwin; Ethan Cutkosky; Shanola Hampton; Steve Howey; Emma Kenney; Cameron Monaghan; Jeremy Allen White; Laura Slade Wiggins; Joan Cusack
- No. of episodes: 12

Release
- Original network: Showtime
- Original release: January 8 – April 1, 2012

Season chronology
- ← Previous; Season 1 Next → Season 3

The second season of Shameless, an American comedy-drama television series based on the British series of the same name by Paul Abbott, premiered on January 8, 2012, at Sunday 9:00 p.m. EST on the Showtime television network. Executive producers are John Wells, Paul Abbott and Andrew Stearn, with producer Michael Hissrich. The season concluded after 12 episodes on April 1, 2012. The show's season premiere brought in 1.58 million viewers, which was higher than the season 1 premiere. The episode airing March 4, "Parenthood", received 1.6 million total viewers, its highest-rated show of the season. The season finale scored 1.45 million viewers.

== Plot ==
The second season begins in the summer, a few months after the events of season one. New developments shift in the lives of the Gallaghers' family and friends: Fiona is now waitressing alongside Veronica at a bar; Ian expresses interest in attending West Point; Mickey is sent back to jail after punching a cop; Karen has joined Sex Addicts Anonymous and has a new eccentric partner, Jody; Tony now lives in the house next door to the Gallaghers; Kevin and Veronica begin trying for a baby.

With Steve out of the picture, Fiona fails to find a better companion, and is upset when Steve returns to the United States with a wife, Estefania, a drug dealer's daughter whom he only married to survive. When Steve finds out Estefania is still interested in her ex-lover, Marco, Steve attempts to smuggle Marco into the United States to get back into Fiona's good graces. Meanwhile, Karen finds out she is pregnant, and hints to Lip that he may be the father. Though Jody initially takes Karen's hand in marriage, Karen realizes the marriage is a mistake and grows a hatred for her husband, kicking Jody out of her life and letting Lip back in. As her pregnancy progresses, Karen feels she would be an unfit mother and decides to put her baby up for adoption. The brush with becoming a father encourages Lip to drop out of school, creating a disagreement between Lip and Fiona.

Frank's abusive mother, Peggy "Grammy" Gallagher is released from prison on medical furlough and immediately storms trouble within the family's already hectic lives. Frank is troubled by Peggy's return, still scarred by his mother's abuse from childhood. When Peggy is diagnosed with terminal cancer, Fiona moves her grandmother into the care of Sheila and Jody, who look after Peggy during her final days. In the process, Sheila and Jody unexpectedly form a sexual relationship. In order to hasten her own death, Peggy dies at the request of being smothered, which is done willingly by Sheila. Frank, clearly conflicted over his mother's death, reconnects with Monica.

Though Fiona is suspicious, Monica comes back to care for the children and help out around the house, though unbeknownst to the rest of the family, she is not taking her medication. With Monica around, Fiona slowly begins to branch out for other opportunities—her reprieve is short-lived, however, when Monica finds the family's stash of money and wastes it all. Not only does Lip find out that Monica got arrested for letting Carl play bumper cars with a Buick, but he also finds out that she stole the money and had to use his own money to bail them out. After Lip harshly reprimands Fiona for not focusing on her family, she breaks down and attempts to pick up the pieces, letting Steve slowly re-enter her life; by this point Steve has successfully smuggled Marco into the United States to reunite with Estefania. During a family dinner, Monica attempts to commit suicide by slitting her wrists in the kitchen. Monica recovers and is transferred to a psychiatric ward, from which she breaks out of with another patient, running away from her family once again.

On the day of Monica's attempted suicide, Karen gives birth in the hospital, but the baby boy is Asian and has Down syndrome. Karen reveals that the father is probably one of her classmates, Timmy Wong, and refuses to do anything with her child. Feeling betrayed by Karen, Lip angrily walks out on her. When the adoptive parents don't want Karen's baby because of his disability, Sheila and Jody steal the baby from the maternity ward to ensure he has a better future. When Sheila refuses to return the baby to the hospital, Karen gives her an ultimatum: choose her or the baby. Sheila chooses the baby.

Lip decides to return to school and he makes up with Fiona. The season concludes with a series of new storylines for the subsequent season: Sheila and Jody, now a couple, nickname Karen's baby "Hymie" after "Hiram." Spurned by her mother, Karen runs away, effectively ending her relationship with Lip. Steve, who the family regularly calls Jimmy now, is back together with Fiona. In the season's final scenes, the family gets rid of an unconscious Frank, removing him from their home and good graces.

== Cast and characters ==
=== Regular ===
- William H. Macy as Frank Gallagher
- Emmy Rossum as Fiona Gallagher
- Justin Chatwin as Steve Wilton / Jimmy Lishman
- Ethan Cutkosky as Carl Gallagher
- Shanola Hampton as Veronica "V" Fisher
- Steve Howey as Kevin "Kev" Ball
- Emma Kenney as Debbie Gallagher
- Cameron Monaghan as Ian Gallagher
- Jeremy Allen White as Philip "Lip" Gallagher
- Laura Slade Wiggins as Karen Jackson

=== Special guest stars ===
- Joan Cusack as Sheila Jackson

=== Recurring ===
- Noel Fisher as Mickey Milkovich
- Emma Greenwell as Mandy Milkovich
- Zach McGowan as Jody Silverman
- Tyler Jacob Moore as Tony Markovich
- Michael Patrick McGill as Tommy
- Dennis Cockrum as Terry Milkovich
- Madison Davenport as Ethel
- Kerry O'Malley as Kate
- Amy Smart as Jasmine Hollander
- Louise Fletcher as Margaret 'Peggy' Gallagher
- Dennis Boutsikaris as Professor Hearst
- Chloe Webb as Monica Gallagher
- Jim Hoffmaster as Kermit
- James Wolk as Adam Lange
- Jack Carter as Stan Kopchek
- Nicky Korba as Little Hank
- Justin Mitchell as Malik
- Stephanie Fantauzzi as Estefania

=== Guests ===
- Pej Vahdat as Kash
- Marguerite Moreau as Linda
- Vanessa Bell Calloway as Carol Fisher
- Harry Hamlin as Lloyd 'Ned' Lishman
- Ed Lauter as Dick Healey
- Dove Cameron as Holly Herkimer
- J. Michael Trautmann as Iggy Milkovich
- Gloria LeRoy as Aunt Ginger
- Julia Duffy as Candace Lishman
- Carlease Burke as Roberta
- Kristoffer Ryan Winters as Clayton Gallagher
- David Wells as Father Pete
- Chris Gartin as Chip Lishman
- Molly Price as Dottie Corones
- Johnny Sneed as Richard
- Taylor Kinney as Craig Heisner
- Diora Baird as Meg
- Joe Adler as Colin Milkovich
- Thierre Di Castro Garrito as Marco

== Episodes ==
No. overall	No. in season	Title	Directed by	Written by	Original release date	Prod. code	US viewers (millions)
13	1	"Summertime"	Mark Mylod	John Wells	January 8, 2012	2J5951	1.58
Frank loses a bet with Baby, a bar patron, and is in over his head $10,000. Frank uses Liam to win sympathy panhandling until Baby takes Liam as collateral. Lip wants to continue seeing Karen, who is now attending Sex Addicts Anonymous meetings and is enjoying a sex-free relationship with an older group member, Jody. Fiona and Veronica are waitressing at a local club. During her shift, Fiona meets Jasmine's secret lover, David, and she flirts with a handsome banker, Adam. Kash secretly leaves his pregnant wife and children for another man. Ian expresses interest in attending West Point, and Lip agrees to help him with his application and grades. Debbie and Carl run a babysitting service in the house to bring in extra funds. Veronica finds out that Kevin and Ethel have been growing marijuana in the bar's basement. When the Gallaghers discover Frank's bet, Fiona is able to retrieve Liam by giving the marijuana to Baby as compensation.
14	2	"Summer Loving"	John Wells	Mike O'Malley	January 15, 2012	2J5952	1.25
As Sheila overcomes more of her agoraphobia, a concerned Frank finds a new financial plan in former bar patron Dottie, whose declining health makes her an ideal match for him. Dottie bonds with Frank but rejects his sexual advances, revealing that her heart could explode if her blood pressure rises. Fiona tries to juggle her job, family life, and a burgeoning love life; Jasmine tries setting Fiona up with a sugar daddy, Richard. Karen continues to see Jody while pursuing a sexual relationship with Lip, who worries that Karen is ready to settle down with Jody. After being released from jail, Mickey reunites with Ian, who helps Mickey get a job at the Kash and Grab. Debbie and Carl both complain to Fiona over wanting more space in the house; Fiona allows Carl to make his own bedroom in the family van. Veronica takes some of the elderly people from the retirement home on an excursion. Shortly after the excursion, an elderly man named Harry dies, which Debbie witnesses.
15	3	"I'll Light a Candle for You Every Day"	Craig Zisk	Nancy M. Pimental	January 22, 2012	2J5953	1.28
Fiona decides to reconnect with Craig Heisner, her high school crush who is now married. While riding the train home, Fiona finds an abandoned purse with $500 in it and decides to spend it on food and groceries. Feeling guilty, Fiona later collects the $500 to return to the purse's owner, but ultimately keeps the money when the owner insults her for living on the South Side. Frank desperately tries to get Dottie's money by proposing to her and secretly intercepting the page telling her she has a new heart. After discovering that the new heart was given to somebody else, a depressed Dottie offers Frank $2,000 to assist her into suicide. Frank reluctantly does so by having sex with Dottie, which causes her heart to explode. Following Harry's passing, Debbie becomes obsessed with death. Jody asks Frank for Karen's hand in marriage; Karen accepts his proposal, and subsequently ends her sexual fling with Lip. Kevin wants to buy the Alibi Room, to Veronica's dismay. After having an ultimately dissatisfying date with Craig, Fiona reconnects with Steve.
16	4	"A Beautiful Mess"	Mark Mylod	Alex Borstein	January 29, 2012	2J5954	1.37
After sleeping with Craig, Fiona is unprepared for the arrival of his irate wife, who begins chasing her throughout the neighborhood. Debbie is overwhelmed with daycare business, and the stress manifests itself into an intense rash. Worried that she is putting too much stress on the kids, Fiona forces Debbie to throw a slumber party for fun. Debbie develops a crush on Carl's friend, Little Hank, and invites him. When Sheila plans to walk to the Alibi Room, Frank realizes his days in the Jackson household are numbered. While walking outside, an airplane wheel falls directly in front of Sheila; the incident causes Sheila to relapse. Ethel bonds with Malik, a teenage father on Kevin's youth basketball team. Ian marches forward in his efforts to get into West Point. Lip attempts to dig up dirt on Jody, and he launches a post-coital plot to get Mandy to seduce Jody. However, Jody rebuffs Mandy and informs Karen, who beats Lip and reveals her pregnancy in front of the Gallaghers.
17	5	"Father's Day"	Anthony Hemingway	Etan Frankel	February 5, 2012	2J5955	1.01
When Eddie Jackson's body turns up in the lake, Frank tries to collect Eddie's life insurance benefits and pension, despite being a prime suspect in his death. Following the airplane wheel incident, combined with the news of Eddie's death, Sheila is unable to leave her bedroom. Ian is visited by a colonel who personally delivers a West Point application for Lip, creating a fallout between Lip and Ian. Fiona confronts Lip about Karen's pregnancy, and Lip is shaken to discover that Karen and Jody have gotten married. Frank is arrested on sexual assault charges for Karen's Daddyz Girl video blog; Frank is released when Karen tells the police that she was the instigator. After catching Kevin secretly visiting another woman, Veronica suspects that Kevin is cheating, but instead finds out he is taking reading classes for his dyslexia. Ethel's older husband, Clyde, is stabbed in prison. Fiona attends a ritzy wedding with Richard, and she is caught lying about her background. Steve returns to Chicago and briefly reunites with Fiona.
18	6	"Can I Have a Mother"	John Dahl	William H. Macy & Steven Schachter	February 12, 2012	2J5956	1.44
Frank's abusive mother, Peggy "Grammy" Gallagher, is released from prison on medical furlough. Peggy clashes with Sheila and forces Frank to help her extort money from an old acquaintance. Fiona and Adam go on a double date with Steve and his wife, Estefania, a drug dealer's daughter whom he only married to survive. Nevertheless, Fiona and Steve have a romantic encounter in the bathroom, causing Adam to leave immediately. Karen and Jody host a wedding party, which is crashed by both Lip and Peggy; Sheila and Peggy fight in front of the partygoers. Lip confronts Karen and reveals he wants her to get an abortion; Karen slaps him. After finding out that Clyde had died, Ethel packs her bags and secretly runs away with Malik, horrifying Kevin and Veronica. Sheila discovers that Eddie had changed his beneficiary to leave his money for Karen. A disappointed Frank lashes out at Jody over the news, causing Sheila to kick Frank out of her house. Debbie informs Fiona of Steve's second life.
19	7	"A Bottle of Jean Nate"	David Nutter	Nancy M. Pimental	February 19, 2012	2J5957	1.41
Jasmine hosts a party on David's boat and invites Fiona, but neglects to inform her that Steve and Estefania are also invited. Following an emotional confrontation with Steve, Fiona is consoled by Jasmine, who suddenly kisses Fiona and professes her love for her. After Jasmine is kicked off David's boat, Jasmine asks Fiona if she can stay at the Gallagher home. When Fiona refuses, Jasmine insults Fiona and angrily ends their friendship. Karen begins to grow disillusioned over married life with Jody; she tricks Jody into signing a prenuptial agreement, and then kicks him out of the house. Karen then rekindles her sexual relationship with Lip. Under Peggy's advice, Ian and Lip make up by "fighting it out". Ethel's departure makes Kevin and Veronica realize they want a baby. Fiona unites with Frank to get rid of his mother when Peggy gets Carl involved in a homemade meth lab. Peggy is picked up by the paramedics after fainting at a hardware store, and Fiona and Frank are informed that Peggy has terminal cancer.
20	8	"Parenthood"	Daisy von Scherler Mayer	Mike O'Malley	March 4, 2012	2J5958	1.60
Frank accidentally walks in on Ian and Mickey having sex. Worried that Frank will tell his homophobic father, Mickey initially plots to kill Frank; he later reneges on his plan and instead punches a cop to purposely send himself back into juvie. Lip wants to quit school to focus on becoming a father, but Fiona tells him that if he reconsiders, she will go back and get her GED. Karen reveals that she wants to give her baby up for adoption, feeling she would be an unfit mother. Lip decides to take Karen to multiple adoption agencies, but is disconcerted when Karen seems more concerned about the money than her baby's future. After Lip purposely gets himself expelled, Fiona gives Lip an ultimatum to either return to school or leave the house, prompting Lip to move out. With Peggy's health rapidly declining, Jody and Sheila begin to take care of her as her condition worsens; Peggy and Sheila reconcile in the process. Wanting to hasten her own death, Peggy convinces Sheila to smother her with a pillow. Upset and confused over his mother's death, Frank reconnects with Monica.
21	9	"Hurricane Monica"	Alex Graves	Alex Borstein	March 11, 2012	2J5959	1.31
Monica blows back into town and immediately hooks up with Frank for more shenanigans, but the kids are left wondering if she will stay for good. Though Fiona is annoyed, Monica makes an attempt to connect with her kids by attending Carl's football games and thanking Fiona for raising the kids in her absence. Monica also takes Ian to a gay club and wins him over with her genuine sympathy over his break-up with Mickey. Frank is eager to pick up Peggy's ashes and reclaim the cash he believes she's hidden; Frank learns from Jody that Peggy did not leave money for him, but did send money to his three brothers. After Karen tries to force him to pay rent, Lip decides to move in with Steve and Estefania. Lip hears Estefania having phone sex with a man named Marco, and he informs Steve. Sheila continues to bond with Jody and apologizes to him for Karen's behavior; the two kiss and end up having sex. Mandy's violent father, Terry Milkovich, breaks into the Gallagher house and punches Ian because Mandy is pregnant.
22	10	"A Great Cause"	Mimi Leder	Etan Frankel	March 18, 2012	2J5960	1.16
As Monica settles into being with the kids again, Fiona begins to plan her future by taking GED classes and taking initiatives to move up in her club job. However, Monica finds the Gallagher's "Squirrel Fund" and blows all of it on drugs and unnecessary items with Frank. Steve attempts to smuggle Marco into the United States to reunite Estefania with her true love and get back into Fiona's good graces, but complications arise when they can't find him. Terry continues to hunt Ian down, while Lip wonders if he impregnated Mandy. Lip and Ian later learn the true identity of the father of Mandy's baby–her own father impregnated her while he was drunk. Ian initiates a fundraiser for Mandy to help pay for an abortion. Kevin and Veronica have been unsuccessful in their attempts to make a baby, prompting Veronica to visit a fertility clinic; she learns that she is highly unlikely to get pregnant because of PID. Sheila and Jody take in a deaf drug addict who is in hospice. Monica gets herself and Carl arrested after letting him drive a car, forcing Lip to bail them out. After Lip scolds Fiona for her neglectfulness, Fiona breaks down.
23	11	"Just Like the Pilgrims Intended"	Mark Mylod	Story by : LaToya Morgan & Nancy M. Pimental; Teleplay by : Nancy M. Pimental	March 25, 2012	2J5961	1.51
The Gallaghers prepare a Thanksgiving dinner, despite Monica refusing to get out of bed. Lip has moved in with Mandy and prepares for the arrival of his baby by creating a movie for when the child grows up. Mandy's brothers get Lip to help them with a robbery, but Lip backs out at the last minute. Marco finally shows up and is enraged that Estefania had sex with Steve. In response, Steve agrees to allow Marco to take his apartment and steal his identity. Ian goes to a gay club and sleeps with an older businessman who calls himself Ned. Karen informs Sheila that she knows about her affair with Jody. During the Thanksgiving dinner, Monica excuses herself from the table and attempts to commit suicide by slitting her wrists in the kitchen, abruptly ending the family's gathering. Karen goes into labor and gives birth; the baby turns out to be Asian and has Down syndrome. Karen refuses to hold her baby and reveals that the father is most likely Timmy Wong, prompting Lip to storm out. When the baby's adoptive parents don't want the baby, Sheila and Jody end up stealing the baby from the maternity ward.
24	12	"Fiona Interrupted"	John Wells	John Wells	April 1, 2012	2J5962	1.45
The Gallaghers reel from the recent events of Monica's attempted suicide and the birth of Karen's developmentally delayed child. Frank plots to free Monica from the psychiatric institution. Monica initially objects, but eventually decides to escape with a fellow patient after Frank and Debbie help them climb out of a window. After escaping, Monica runs away, informing Debbie that the family would be better without her sticking around. Steve, who the family calls Jimmy now, gets back into Fiona's good graces and decides to let her meet his family. Ian discovers when meeting Jimmy's family that Ned, the man he slept with a few days earlier, is really Jimmy's father Lloyd. Sheila and Jody take care of Karen's baby, whom they have named Hymie. When Sheila refuses to give the baby back to the hospital, Karen gives her an ultimatum: her or the baby. Sheila reluctantly chooses the baby, prompting Karen to pack her bags and run away. Lip tells Karen she will regret the decision in the future. Fiona passes her GED and convinces Lip to finish high school. Mandy pushes Lip to move back in with his family; Lip returns to the Gallagher house and makes up with Fiona.

== Development and production ==
The show's second season began shooting on July 5, 2011 and it premiered on Sunday, January 8, 2012 at a new time slot at 9:00pm.

== Casting ==
Noel Fisher, Pej Vahdat, Tyler Jacob Moore and Vanessa Bell Calloway return in the second season as Mickey Milkovich, Kash, Tony Markovich and Carol Fisher respectively. The role of Mandy Milkovich, which was originally played by Jane Levy in season one, was recast due to Levy landing a lead role in the ABC show Suburgatory. In late 2011, it was announced that Emma Greenwell would play Levy's character for the duration of the show. Zach McGowan was cast as Jody Silverman, Karen's love interest in the beginning of the season. Stephanie Fantauzzi was cast as Estefania, Steve's Brazilian wife.

== Reception ==
Review aggregator Rotten Tomatoes gives the second season 100%, based on 11 reviews. The critics consensus reads, "The good times continue to roll in Shameless's second season as the series ups the ante with outrageous gags and unabashed joy for the ties that bind."

== DVD release ==
The Complete Second Season
Set details		Special features
12 episodes; 600 minutes (Region 1); 604 minutes (Region 4); 3-disc set; 1.77:1 aspect ratio; Languages: English (Dolby Digital 2.0 Surround); Subtitles: English, and French (Region 1); English, Spanish, Danish, French, Dutch, Finnish, Norwegian, Swedish, English and German for the Hearing Impaired (Regions 2 and 4)		The Complicated Life of Fiona Gallagher – (featurette) Fiona returns with a whole new host of problems, and Rossum talks about her character and the future of the Gallagher clan.; The Art of Acting Drunk – (featurette) William H. Macy takes a hard look at Frank and his future.; Behind the Scenes: Writing the Shameless Version – (featurette) A second-season roundtable chat featuring executive producer-writer John Wells, consulting producer Mike O'Malley, supervising producer/writer Nancy M. Pimental, writer Latoya Morgan and co-producer-writer Etan Frankel.; A Shameless Actor Discussion – Interviews between various cast members.; The Ghetto Girl and the Car Thief – Emmy Rossum and Justin Chatwin; Sibling Rivalry – Cameron Monaghan and Jeremy Allen White; The Bartender and the Sex-Cam Worker – Steve Howey and Shanola Hampton; Juvenile Delinquents – Emma Kenney and Ethan Cutkosky; The Agoraphobe and the Beautiful Mess – Laura Slade Wiggins and Joan Cusack; A Shameless Look at Season 3 – A behind-the-scenes sneak peek of the third season of Shameless; The Shameless Christmas Carol – Music Video; Deleted Scenes – A small selection of deleted scenes of the series.; Episodes: 2, 3, 5, 8, 12, 13, 14, 16, 19
Release dates
United States	Australia	
December 18, 2012	February 13, 2013	
