= Fiona Interrupted =

- Shameless episode
- Episode no.: Season 2 Episode 12
- Directed by: John Wells
- Written by: John Wells
- Cinematography by: Rodney Charters
- Editing by: Kelley Dixon
- Production code: 2J5962
- Original release date: April 1, 2012
- Running time: 56 minutes

Guest appearances
- Joan Cusack as Sheila Jackson; Harry Hamlin as Lloyd Lishman; Chloe Webb as Monica Gallagher; Zach McGowan as Jody; Stephanie Fantauzzi as Estefania; Emma Greenwell as Mandy Milkovich; Tyler Jacob Moore as Tony Markovich; Julia Duffy as Candace Lishman; Christopher Gartin as Chip Lishman; Jim Hoffmaster as Kermit; William Charles Mitchell as Teacher; Larry Herron as Ollie; Jenna Elfman as Jill

Episode chronology
← Previous "Just Like the Pilgrims Intended"	Next → "El Gran Cañon"
- Shameless season 2

"Fiona Interrupted" is the twelfth episode and season finale of the second season of the American television comedy drama Shameless, an adaptation of the British series of the same name. It is the 24th overall episode of the series and was written and directed by series developer John Wells. It originally aired on Showtime on April 1, 2012.

The series is set on the South Side of Chicago, Illinois, and depicts the poor, dysfunctional family of Frank Gallagher, a neglectful single father of six: Fiona, Phillip, Ian, Debbie, Carl, and Liam. He spends his days drunk, high, or in search of money, while his children need to learn to take care of themselves. In the episode, Frank tries to get Monica out of a psychiatric institution while Karen makes an ultimatum to her mother.

According to Nielsen Media Research, the episode was seen by an estimated 1.45 million household viewers and gained a 0.7 rating share among adults aged 18–49. The episode received highly positive reviews from critics, who praised the writing, directing and performance of the episode.

== Plot ==
The Gallaghers are affected by the recent events of Monica's attempted suicide and the birth of Karen's developmentally delayed child. In the aftermath of her suicide attempt, Monica is now in a psychiatric institution; Frank visits her, promising to help her escape.

Lip and Karen return to her house, having been informed that Sheila stole the baby from the hospital. Sheila and Jody want to take care of the baby, whom they named Hymie, but Karen wants the baby back in adoption. Lip tries to interfere, but is reminded by Karen that he is not the father, causing him to walk out, cutting ties with Karen. When Sheila makes it clear she wants to keep the baby, Karen calls the cops. One of these is Tony, who is bewildered by Karen's actions. When they refuse to take the baby or arrest Sheila, Karen makes an ultimatum to her mother; the baby or her. Steve, now going by Jimmy again, decides to take Fiona and her family to dine with his parents. The dinner goes well until Jimmy's father, Lloyd arrives; Ian recognizes Lloyd as the man he had sex with a few nights earlier. Later, Fiona and Steve have sex, but are interrupted by Estefania, who shows up crying and asks Jimmy to let her stay, revealing that she was abused by Marco.

With the help of a bar patron, Frank and Debbie sneak into the institution to retrieve Monica. They convince her in escaping, along with her new girlfriend, Jill . They escape through a window, but Frank is surprised when Monica flees with Jill in the car; Debbie tearfully reveals that Monica told her they are better off without her. While talking with Lip, Mandy consoles his predicament and suggests he should go back home. The following day, he returns to school to finish a test. He then visits Karen, who is packing her bags. When Karen pushes Sheila to make a decision, Sheila chooses the baby, prompting Karen to storm out; Lip tells her she will regret her decision in the future. That night, Frank goes to the house and gets into a fight with Ian, prompting Estefania to knock him out with a frying pan. The family drags Frank outside, just as Lip returns home.

== Production ==
=== Development ===
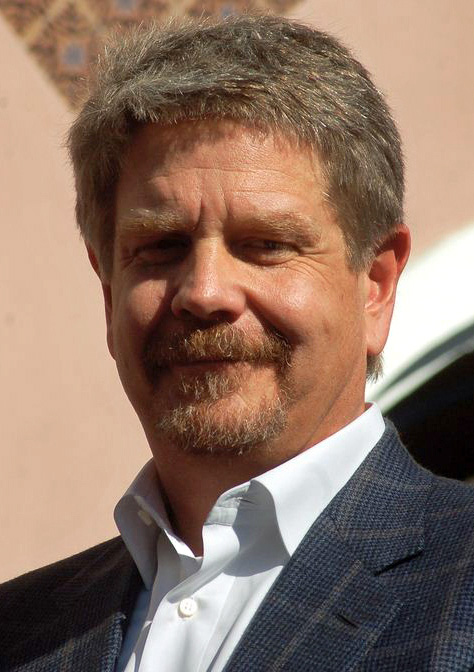
The episode was written and directed by John Wells.

The episode was written and directed by series developer John Wells. It was Wells' fifth writing credit and third directing credit.

== Reception ==
=== Viewers ===
In its original American broadcast, "Fiona Interrupted" was seen by an estimated 1.45 million household viewers with a 0.7 in the 18–49 demographics. This means that 0.7 percent of all households with televisions watched the episode. This was a slight decrease in viewership from the previous episode, which was seen by an estimated 1.51 million household viewers with a 0.8 in the 18–49 demographics.

=== Critical reviews ===
"Fiona Interrupted" received highly positive reviews from critics. Joshua Alston of The A.V. Club gave the episode a "B+" grade and wrote, "My biggest complain about "Father Frank, Full Of Grace," the season one Shameless finale, was that it felt tacked on, since most of the season arcs had been resolved already, and it only seemed to exist to line up the dominoes for season two. This is definitely not the case with "Fiona, Interrupted," which ties up the season's hanging threads, if perhaps a little too neatly at times, and doesn't lay groundwork for season three so much as it moves all the characters back to their respective starting lines." Alston commended the intense dramatic elements of the episode, writing "It’s rare for Shameless to hold a straight face for quite this long, and it was incredibly rewarding to see the show resist flinching with some goofy joke in favor of fully embracing its pathos."

Alan Sepinwall of HitFix was largely positive of the episode, praising the episode's dramatic content as well as the performances, particularly Rossum and Cusack. Sepinwall concluded "There were times where I wasn't sure exactly where this season was headed, but they brought things home so, so well." Tim Basham of Paste gave the episode an 8.7 out of 10 rating and wrote, "In the best form of dark humor, Shameless deals with the traditionally unlovable, the ragged edges of society. It holds a collective mirror to our faces as a culture and to our attempts at protecting its more helpless citizens, even when the assistance is sometimes unwanted, often unappreciated and frequently ineffective."

Kelsea Stahler of Hollywood.com wrote, "For all its nefarious, seedy activities, Shameless is at heart, a show about family. But the thing about family is that it doesn't always appear as we expect. And as painful as it is to watch the Gallaghers go through the realization that the average definition of the nuclear family is completely irrelevant to their lives, it's even more rewarding when they manage anyway." Leigh Raines of TV Fanatic gave the episode a perfect 5 star rating out of 5 and wrote, "Luckily for us all, Shameless has already gotten the green light for Season 3 so who knows what guest stars may be returning?! Overall, I thought this season was fantastic and outshone season one."
