= A Great Cause =

- Shameless episode
- Episode no.: Season 2 Episode 10
- Directed by: Mimi Leder
- Written by: Etan Frankel
- Cinematography by: Rodney Charters
- Editing by: Regis Kimble
- Production code: 2J5960
- Original release date: March 18, 2012
- Running time: 54 minutes

Guest appearances
- Joan Cusack as Sheila Jackson; Chloe Webb as Monica Gallagher; Zach McGowan as Jody; Stephanie Fantauzzi as Estefania; Emma Greenwell as Mandy Milkovich; Dennis Cockrum as Terry Milkovich; David Wells as Father Pete; Moshe Kasher as Ruben; Diora Baird as Meg; J.D. Goldblatt as GED Teacher; Thierre Di Castro as Marco; J.P. Hubbell as Sergeant Stryker; Ellen Gerstein as Aunt Rande

Episode chronology
| ← Previous "Hurricane Monica" | Next → "Just Like the Pilgrims Intended" |
- Shameless season 2

"A Great Cause" is the tenth episode of the second season of the American television comedy drama Shameless, an adaptation of the British series of the same name. It is the 22nd overall episode of the series and was written by co-producer Etan Frankel, and directed by Mimi Leder. It originally aired on Showtime on March 18, 2012.

The series is set on the South Side of Chicago, Illinois, and depicts the poor, dysfunctional family of Frank Gallagher, a neglectful single father of six: Fiona, Phillip, Ian, Debbie, Carl, and Liam. He spends his days drunk, high, or in search of money, while his children need to learn to take care of themselves. In the episode, Frank and Monica steal the family's fund and go on a shopping spree, while Ian and Lip discover the real father of Mandy's baby.

According to Nielsen Media Research, the episode was seen by an estimated 1.16 million household viewers and gained a 0.6 ratings share among adults aged 18–49. The episode received mostly positive reviews from critics, who praised the dramatic elements of the episode.

== Plot ==
Monica is now spending more time with her family, often getting Debbie and Carl to stay up late at night to watch movies with her and Frank. Ian continues to get harassed by Terry, who believes he got Mandy pregnant. Per Monica's suggestion, Ian tries to enlist in the Marines, but is turned down as he lacks a high school diploma.

With Monica around to help out, Fiona begins to focus on her future by taking GED classes and taking initiatives to move up in her club job; her boss, Meg, hesitantly agrees to let Fiona manage a club night. Steve attempts to smuggle Marco into the United States to reunite Estefania with her true love and get back into Fiona's good graces, but complications arise when they can't find him. Estefania later gets mad at Steve when he realizes Marco is running out of resources and calls him a "dead man" before leaving their room. Sheila and Jody take in Ruben, a deaf drug addict, into their new "hospice". Sheila struggles to communicate with Ruben, until Jody reveals he knows American Sign Language and can finally see what he needs. Kevin and Veronica have been unsuccessful in their attempts to make a baby, prompting Veronica to visit a fertility clinic; she later discovers that she is highly unlikely to get pregnant because of PID.

Monica finds the family's "Squirrel Fund" and decides to get her and Frank a few gifts, including drugs and a new car. After Terry once again tries to shoot Ian in his house, Mandy pulls up a shotgun on her father to let Ian live. Lip and Ian realize that Terry actually got Mandy pregnant while drunk, and he was trying to express his guilt by framing Ian. To help with an abortion, Ian starts a fundraiser with his family. Monica takes Carl on a ride, and allows him to drive the car, which leads to their arrest. Lip arrives at the house to get bail money but realizes Monica took the fund; he is forced to use his own money to bail them out. Before Fiona leaves for her night at the club, Lip informs Fiona about the event and harshly reprimands her for not focusing on her family. Stunned, Fiona says she thought it would be different this time. After tearfully scolding Monica for her actions, Fiona returns to the living room, where she breaks down before cleaning up the kitchen.

== Production ==
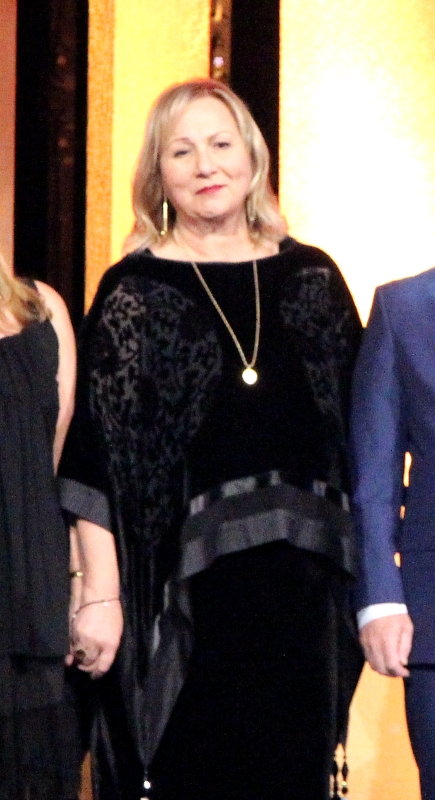
The episode was directed by Mimi Leder.

The episode was written by co-producer Etan Frankel, and directed by Mimi Leder. It was Frankel's third writing credit, and Leder's second directing credit.

== Reception ==
=== Viewers ===
In its original American broadcast, "A Great Cause" was seen by an estimated 1.16 million household viewers with a 0.6 in the 18–49 demographics. This means that 0.6 percent of all households with televisions watched the episode. This was a 12% decrease in viewership from the previous episode, which was seen by an estimated 1.31 million household viewers with a 0.7 in the 18–49 demographics.

=== Critical reviews ===
"A Great Cause" received mostly positive reviews from critics. Joshua Alston of The A.V. Club gave the episode a "B" grade and wrote, ""A Good Cause" was a battle between the version of Shameless I like — the one that is poignant and rings true even when its class shadings are foreign to me — and the version that completely drains me, the one that seems to exist only as an exercise in boundary-pushing rather than a character-based story." Alston praised Monica's storyline, commenting highly on Ethan Cutkosky's performance as Carl: "He only has a few wordless seconds to communicate his fear and disappointment when he's at the police station with Monica, and he nails it." However, he criticized the Sheila and Jody subplot, calling it "gross, over-the-top, and not particularly funny."

Tim Basham of Paste gave the episode a 7.8 out of 10 rating, highlighting the episode's dramatic content: "While this comedy/drama often features the sad and tragic, the show never quite reaches the extremely horrible stage of sad and tragic, as in the death of a child or a primary character, although this week it came close." Leigh Raines of TV Fanatic gave the episode a perfect 5 star rating out of 5 and also praised the dramatic elements, writing "For all the laughter their crazy lives produce, tonight we were reminded of just how dark a world the Gallaghers and their friends live in." Kelsea Stahler of Hollywood.com wrote, "Shameless is a wasteland of broken hearts, but no shattered dream hurt nearly as much as Fiona's this week."
