= El Gran Cañon =

- Shameless episode
- Episode no.: Season 3 Episode 1
- Directed by: Mark Mylod
- Written by: John Wells
- Cinematography by: Rodney Charters
- Editing by: Regis Kimble
- Production code: 2J6601
- Original release date: January 13, 2013
- Running time: 59 minutes

Guest appearances
- Joan Cusack as Sheila Jackson; Harry Hamlin as Lloyd Lishman; Stephanie Fantauzzi as Estefania; Ed Lauter as Dick Healey; Bernardo de Paula as Beto; Pepê Rapazote as Nando; Lombardo Boyar as Manuel; Diora Baird as Meg; Thierre Di Castro as Marco; Danny Mora as Chapman Young; Tara Karsian as Celia

Episode chronology
← Previous "Fiona Interrupted"	Next → "The American Dream"
- Shameless season 3

"El Gran Cañon" is the first episode of the third season of the American television comedy drama Shameless, an adaptation of the British series of the same name. It is the 25th overall episode of the series and was written by series developer John Wells and directed by executive producer Mark Mylod. It originally aired on Showtime on January 13, 2013.

The series is set on the South Side of Chicago, Illinois, and depicts the poor, dysfunctional family of Frank Gallagher, a neglectful single father of six: Fiona, Phillip, Ian, Debbie, Carl, and Liam. He spends his days drunk, high, or in search of money, while his children need to learn to take care of themselves. In the episode, Frank finds himself in Mexico, while Jimmy is confronted by Estafania's father.

According to Nielsen Media Research, the episode was seen by an estimated 2.00 million household viewers and gained a 1.1 ratings share among adults aged 18–49, making it the most watched episode of the series. The episode received highly positive reviews from critics, who praised its humor and dark tone.

== Plot ==
Fiona (Emmy Rossum) struggles to adapt to life with Jimmy (Justin Chatwin) who has officially moved in with the Gallaghers to help raise the family. Debbie (Emma Kenney) is worried that Frank (William H. Macy) has been missing for 137 days. Frank is revealed to be in Ciudad Juárez, Mexico, with no memory of how he got there. He is also unable to cross the border, as he does not carry a passport.

In the street, Jimmy is kidnapped by Nando (Pêpê Rapazote), the father of Estefania (Stephanie Fantauzzi), and a powerful mob leader. He confronts Jimmy and Estefania at their apartment, when Marco (Thierre Di Castro) walks in. Nando executes Marco in front of Estefania and Jimmy, forcing the latter to help him dispose of the body. At a yacht, Nando tells Steve that he will have to continue his marriage with Estefania so she can get the citizenship. Meanwhile, Sheila (Joan Cusack) and Jody (Zach McGowan) struggle with parental life, as they are overwhelmed by Hymie's constant crying. Lip (Jeremy Allen White) faces problems with the law after stealing equipment to build a robot; he is ultimately held on a $500 bond, and Mandy (Emma Greenwell) bails him out. Mandy has moved in with the Gallaghers, much to Fiona's dismay; Fiona asks Lip if he is being responsible about sex. Ian (Cameron Monaghan) is still having sex with Lloyd (Harry Hamlin), without informing their respective families.

Frank tries to cross the border with the help of coyotes, but they are ambushed by U.S. Customs and Border Protection officials and taken back to Mexico. Frank convinces a man to make a fake passport for him by agreeing to become a drug mule. While the officer hesitates, he allows Frank to finally cross the border, where he is then picked up by a woman working for the smugglers. Lip, Ian, Mandy and Carl (Ethan Cutkosky) compete in a robot fighting competition; despite having the odds against him, Lip manages to destroy the other robot. They win a $400 cash prize, which they put towards the past due property tax. However, unbeknownst to anyone else, Fiona has put $1,000 down on an upcoming night at the club to be the club's promoter. As the Gallaghers have dinner, Frank arrives; only Debbie hugs her father while the rest of the family silently resume their activities.

== Production ==
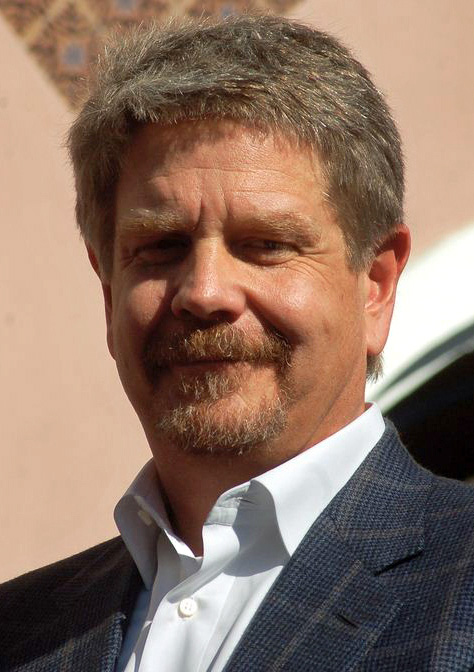
The episode was written by John Wells.

The episode was written by series developer John Wells, and directed by executive producer Mark Mylod. It was Wells' sixth writing credit, and Mylod's seventh directing credit.

== Reception ==
=== Viewers ===
In its original American broadcast, "El Gran Cañon" was seen by an estimated 2.00 million household viewers with a 1.1 in the 18–49 demographics. This means that 1.1 percent of all households with televisions watched the episode. This was a 37% increase in viewership from the previous episode, which was seen by an estimated 1.45 million household viewers with a 0.7 in the 18–49 demographics.

=== Critical reviews ===
"El Gran Cañon" received highly positive reviews from critics. Joshua Alston of The A.V. Club gave the episode a "B" grade and wrote, "At least initially; "El Gran Canon" establishes that the rule is for Shameless seasons to get off to a toddling start. There's yet another time jump as was the case last year, and with an ensemble of this size, a big chunk of time has to be devoted to checking in with the many gnarled limbs of the Gallagher family tree. So, for what it's worth, "El Gran Canon" did that. I now have an idea what the Gallaghers have been up to since I last saw them. But as was the case with the season two premiere, I wasn't left especially excited about the season to come. Is there not a way to do a Shameless premiere that would get me... I don't know... amped?"

Alan Sepinwall of HitFix wrote, "Between the corpse disposal sequence and Frank getting mixed up with coyotes, this in a way felt like a mash-up of stories from several other Showtime shows, past and present. But mostly, it felt like an episode of Shameless – which is a very welcome thing." Leanne Aguilera of Hollywood.com wrote, "The dramedy returned with so many hilarious, disgusting and downright bizarre moments that our heads are still spinning."

David Crow of Den of Geek wrote, "With all this drama, it is a wonder what role Frank will play in the evolving household. If the last scene is any indication, it's something he should definitely be worrying about." Leigh Raines of TV Fanatic gave the episode a 4 star rating out of 5 and wrote, "Overall I really missed the Gallaghers. I'm curious to see how Fiona does managing the club but I really think she has the chops to pull it off. Obviously it's never easy for any of them to make money or Kevin and V wouldn't be playing slaveowner sex driver for the webcam, but I think Fiona could be good at the club gig."
