= The Attic Door =

- Directed by: Danny Daneau
- Written by: Danny Daneau; Eric Ernst
- Produced by: Erica Harrell
- Starring: Madison Davenport; Jake Johnson
- Cinematography: Scott Uhlfelder
- Edited by: Danny Daneau; Sean Lagrange
- Music by: Kristin Øhrn Dyrud
- Distributed by: Nightlight Pictures
- Release date: April 4, 2009 (Florida Film Festival)
- Running time: 78 minutes
- Country: United States
- Language: English

The Attic Door is a 2009 dramatic psychological thriller and the first feature-length film by director/writer Danny Daneau, from a script he co-wrote with Eric Ernst. Produced by Erica Harrell, the film stars Madison Davenport and Jake Johnson. The film was acquired by New Video and is now available for rent or download through various streaming sites. Set in the turn of the century American West, a young brother and sister must confront their greatest fear in a haunting and romantic story about growing up.

== Plot ==
In The Attic Door, two siblings, a brother and sister, are left alone in a far-flung and desolate area of the American Old West. Every day, the siblings endeavor to maintain the family farm, apprehensively waiting for their parents' return. Having no place to escape to, the brother and sister discover that they are not completely alone on their farm. They repudiate the truth that something behind their attic door is now awake but must now face brave their greatest fear. The Attic Door is a story of the "love, loss, loneliness, and the truth behind childhood fears."

== Production ==
The western themed film was shot at various locations in Utah. The film completed post production in the summer of 2009.

== Response ==
- Winner of Best Film, Best Cinematography, and Best Score at the 2009 Bend Film Festival.
- "The Attic Door is a Must See.... Danny Daneau's debut feature is the work of an assured filmmaker with vision and control. It will be a long while before it dislodges itself from my mind."
- "Although mature in theme, A Monster in the Attic is a psychological thriller for children and families alike.", Amstravelnews, August 3, 2007.
- "Madison Davenport may be only 11 years old, but the Texas born-'n'-bred actress has a résumé that suits Hollywood's biggest names", Scholastic.com, June 20, 2009.
- "Utah sets precedent for first student film incentive", Park City Utah's "Park Record", January 18, 2008.
