= Humboldt County (film) =

- Directed by: Darren Grodsky; Danny Jacobs
- Written by: Darren Grodsky; Danny Jacobs
- Produced by: Jason Weiss
- Starring: Fairuza Balk; Peter Bogdanovich; Frances Conroy; Madison Davenport; Brad Dourif; Chris Messina; Jeremy Strong
- Cinematography: Ernest Holzman
- Music by: iZLER
- Distributed by: Magnolia Pictures
- Release dates: March 11, 2008 (SXSW); September 26, 2008
- Running time: 97 minutes
- Country: United States
- Language: English
- Box office: $82,357

Humboldt County is a 2008 comedy drama film by Darren Grodsky and Danny Jacobs. It stars Jeremy Strong in his film debut, Fairuza Balk, Frances Conroy, Madison Davenport, Brad Dourif, Chris Messina and Peter Bogdanovich. The film made its debut at SXSW on March 11, 2008. It was picked up by Magnolia Pictures and was released on September 26, 2008.

== Plot ==
Peter Hadley is an overachieving medical student at UCLA. He is given failing grades on his final exam by his professor, who also happens to be his father. Unable to graduate, he becomes bitter and disillusioned. He then meets up with the actress who played the part of his patient in his final exam, the free-spirited part-time jazz singer Bogart. The two of them go back to her apartment after a night at a jazz club and have casual sex. Afterwards she gets up to go for a drive and asks Peter if he'd like to come, to which he agrees. The two of them drive north through the night and Peter eventually dozes off. When he wakes up, he finds that Bogart has driven all the way to Humboldt County. It is here that he meets her family. Jack and Rosie took her in when her family abandoned her, and they became her surrogate parents. He also meets Max, Jack and Rosie's son and Charity, Max's daughter.

After an uncomfortable night in which Peter finds out that they are all involved in growing pot, he finally manages to go to sleep. The next morning he is woken up abruptly by Max. When he gets dressed, he finds out that Bogart has left. Stranded and unwilling to call his father for help, Peter's only choice is to take the bus, which won't come for another day. With nothing else to do, Max enlists him to help with his marijuana crop, which Peter reluctantly agrees to do. After a day of working on some irrigation problems, they relax back at Jack and Rosie's house. Bob and Steve, friends of Max, arrive bloodied and dirty. Some local hicks found their garden, roughed them up and took their plants. The next day, Peter helps Max with his plants again. He becomes so focused on the work that he misses the bus. It is after this that he begins to bond with Max and the rest of his family. He quickly falls in love with the natural surroundings and the residents of the rural community and stops trying to leave. He begins to understand empathy and love (the thing he previously lacked, which caused him to fail his final exam in the first place). When Jack asks him what he plans to do after this, Peter is shocked to realize that he'd never considered an "after this".

His sudden fear that he would never leave is further solidified by a conversation that he has with Bob and Steve in a bar later that night. Steve explains that almost everyone who lives in Humboldt County now came from somewhere else and never left, including Rosie and Jack (who used to be a Physics professor at UCLA). He also reveals that he was in Peter's shoes a few years earlier; he was a student at Stanford and followed a girl out to Humboldt county and never left. When Peter expresses doubts that their situations were similar, Steve also mentions that the girl he followed was Bogart. When they get up to leave, Bob refuses because he notices the guys that stole their plants sitting at a table behind them. While he and Steve argue about whether or not he's actually going to confront them, Peter drunkenly walks over and starts accusing the men and admonishing them for their cowardice. He then throws his drink in one of their faces and they all run out of the bar with the hicks in pursuit. They get away and are walking through the woods, laughing about what Peter had just done when Steve says that he wants to show them something. He takes them up to an unfamiliar area of the woods where there is a massive plantation, at least fifty plants. Steve and Bob start to steal a couple because they figured that no one would notice. At this time, Peter sees a sleeping bag on the ground just seconds before someone fires a shotgun at them. As they run away, Peter stops and looks back at the person chasing them, it is Max. It's revealed that this is his secret garden. Max is furious with Peter for trying to steal his plants and he yells at him to leave, brandishing the shotgun.

When Peter gets back to Jack's house, Jack is in the living room waiting for him. He confronts Peter and asks him how many plants Max has. At first, Peter is hesitant to answer, so Jack takes him out on a nature walk and explains to him the dangers of having more than a few plants. He believes that by growing only twenty plants, he makes enough to get by and keeps from attracting the DEA's attention. He warns Peter against letting greed run his life, because doing so destroys the entire reason they came out to the lost coast in the first place; to find salvation. After this, he goes to Max's trailer and asks him why he didn't tell him about the other plants. Max angrily fumes that he was planning on telling Peter as they got closer to harvest time. It's at this time that a federal SUV pulls up and Peter and Max are taken into custody. Peter is interrogated about Max's purchase history which includes fertilizer and water tubing, but he says nothing and they are let go due to a lack of any solid evidence against them. Afterwards Peter starts to question why he is still there. The next day, Jack has a BBQ. He confronts Max about his secret crop. Avoiding a direct question from Jack, Max instead mocks him, saying that the presence of the Federal police is probably due to their eagerness to steal Jack's extensive research on physics. Jack angrily storms off and Rosie begins to tell Peter about Max's real father. Jack, Rosie and her then-husband, Charlie were all friends when they worked as professors at UCLA and they decided to move to Humboldt County together. However, eventually Charlie, who had been a long time alcoholic and drinking buddy of Jack's, died in a car accident while on LSD.

Peter decides that he can't be a part of Max's operation any more and he tries to leave. Max gets angry and tells him that this isn't a game and he can't back out, but Peter starts walking away anyway. Max then starts to cry and tells Peter that if he doesn't pull this off, Charity will end up just like him. While this affects Peter greatly, he continues to walk off. Charity then finds Peter crying by a tree and asks him what's wrong. He asks her what she wants to be when she grows up and she says an astronaut. When she asks him what he wants to be, he says that he no longer knows, and she says that that's all right, which comforts Peter.

The next day, Peter's father shows up at the house, using Star-69 and MapQuest he managed to find where Peter was. After a brief visit with Jack and Rosie, where he is greatly put off to find that this is where his son has been all this time, he tells Peter that they're leaving, and Peter reluctantly goes with him despite his new-found bond with Jack and Rosie. As they're driving, his father tells Peter that he decided to pass him, but this news doesn't affect Peter much. He then sees Bob and Steve speeding down the road in the opposite direction, followed by Max and then by a federal helicopter. Peter realizes that they must have found Max's secret crop and are on their way to raid it. He gets out of the car and tells his father to head for the beach (advice that Max had told him earlier) and he runs off to stop Max from trying to save his crop.

Peter's father gets to the beach, where he finds Jack along with all of the other local pot farmers. He informs him that Peter took off. Jack hadn't seen Max anywhere and he connected the dots and headed off towards Max's crop. When Peter gets there, he finds Max trying to save as many of his plants before the DEA gets there and Peter begins to help. Then the feds show up and Peter and Max narrowly manage to hide themselves. Then Jack shows up and leads them both back to the beach, where Charity happily reunites with Max. Peter says that he's sorry to Max for his loss and Max tells him not to take it so seriously. That night, Max is at the bar drowning his sorrows when his drunken behavior gets him kicked out. He is then seen driving down the highway and laughing to himself. The scene then cuts to the next day when a sheriff shows up at Jack and Rosie's and informs them that Max is dead.

They then call Peter, who is staying at a hotel with his father, and tell him. He attends the funeral and afterwards finds Jack in his study, weeping to himself. Jack is ridden with guilt. Jack says that it was his idea to come up to Humboldt County and he blames himself for the deaths of Charlie and now Max. He breaks down saying that he has nothing left. In response, Peter tells Jack that he has so much left and that he had not yet reached the event horizon (a concept of physics that Jack had described to Peter as the point of no return). The ending is left up to the viewer for interpretation. It shows Peter and his father having breakfast at a diner before heading back to Los Angeles. A bus pulls up outside and stops as one of the passengers needs to use the restroom. Peter gets up – his father apparently assuming he is going to the bathroom – and heads outside. Peter gets on the bus, which leaves when the other passenger gets back. Peter stares out at the landscape, not knowing where he's going and seemingly content with that.

== Cast ==
- Jeremy Strong as Peter Hadley
- Peter Bogdanovich as Professor Hadley
- Frances Conroy as Rosie
- Fairuza Balk as Bogart
- Madison Davenport as Charity
- Brad Dourif as Jack
- Chris Messina as Max

== Critical response ==
As of June 2020, Humboldt County holds a 60% approval rating on the review aggregator Rotten Tomatoes, based on 20 reviews with an average rating of 5.84/10. Metacritic reported the film had an average score of 54 out of 100 based on nine reviews, indicating "mixed or average" reviews.
