= Mageina Tovah =

American actress

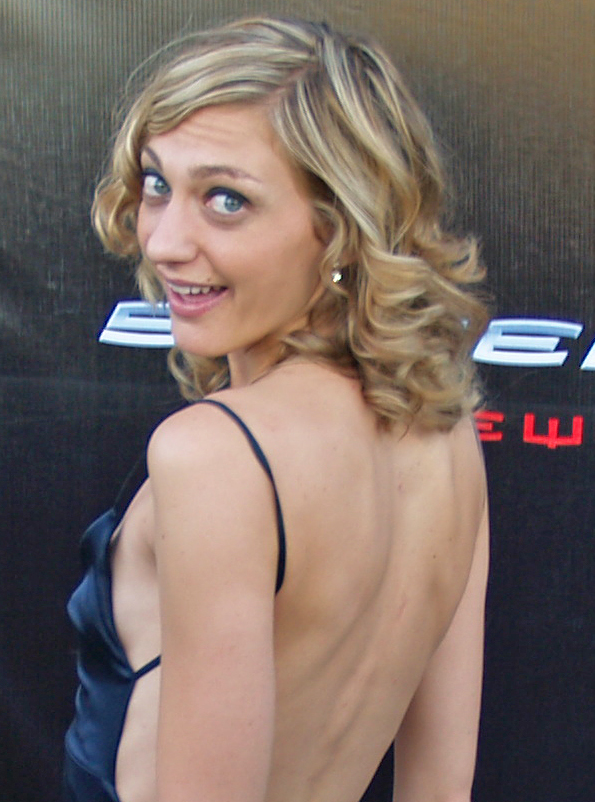
- Tovah at the premiere of Spider-Man 3 in 2007
- Occupation: Actress
- Years active: 2001–present

Mageina Tovah (born 1980 or 1981) is an American actress. She had roles as Glynis Figliola in the television series Joan of Arcadia (2003–2005), as Ursula Ditkovich in Spider-Man 2 and Spider-Man 3 and Zelda Schiff, the head librarian in The Magicians.

== Early life ==
Tovah is Jewish. Her father is a pediatric psychiatrist and her mother is a pediatric physical therapist, both practicing their professions in the Army. She grew up in Nashville, Tennessee, where the family moved when she was 12 years old, after they had lived on a farm in Clarksville, Tennessee. After finishing high school when she was 16, she went to Caltech to study engineering and math. From there she went to the University of Southern California, where her interests changed to the theater.

== Career ==
Tovah and a friend formed Silo Theatre Company in Los Angeles after college. "It was terrific," she said. When her friend moved to New York, she shut down Silo and began acting with the Ray Bradbury Theater in Los Angeles.

Tovah had a recurring role on Joan of Arcadia (2003–2005). Her television work includes guest roles on a number of TV shows. These include Buffy the Vampire Slayer, NYPD Blue, Six Feet Under, The Shield, Cold Case, Shameless, Crossing Jordan, American Horror Story, Private Practice, The Mentalist, and The Magicians. Tovah's feature film work includes roles in The SpongeBob SquarePants Movie, Dark Heart, Bickford Shmeckler's Cool Ideas, and a recurring role as Ursula Ditkovich in the films Spider-Man 2 and Spider-Man 3.

Tovah made an appearance in the Jonas Åkerlund-directed music video for Christina Aguilera's hit song "Beautiful".

Hux, directed by Tovah, was named Best Dramatic Short at the Hollywood Reel Independent Film Festival in 2016.

== Filmography ==
=== Film ===
Film
Year	Title	Role	Notes
2001	Virus Man	Young Girl	
2002	Dine & Shine		
2002	Reflections of Evil		Direct-to-DVD
2003	The Pool at Maddy Breaker's	Louise	TV movie
2003	Hope Abandoned	Maid	Short film
2004	Y.M.I.	Nevermore	
2004	Spider-Man 2	Ursula Ditkovich	
2004	Sleepover	Girl on Phone	
2004	The SpongeBob SquarePants Movie	Usher	Post-credit scene
2004	Do Geese See God?	Rose Vendor	Short film
2005	Waterborne	Lillian	Direct-to-DVD
2006	Dark Heart	Jessica	
2006	Bickford Shmeckler's Cool Ideas	Sam	
2007	Spider-Man 3	Ursula Ditkovich	
2007	Live!	Kelly	Direct-to-DVD
2008	The Walking Wounded	Sadie	Short film
2008	Dream from Leaving		
2012	Neighbors	Sara Jerritt	Short film
2012	The Factory	Brittany	Direct-to-DVD
2013	Decoding Annie Parker	Ellen	
2015	Suburban Memoir	Mrs. R	Short film; AKA Holy Land
2016	No Stranger Pilgrims	Olivia	Short film
2016	Hux	Hux	Short film; also writer / director
2016	Eliza Sherman's Revenge	Jodi Kromwell	

=== Television ===
Television
Year	Title	Role	Notes
2001	The Guardian	Debbie	Episode: "Feeding Frenzy"
2001	Buffy the Vampire Slayer	Jonesing Girl	Episode: "Wrecked"
2002	NYPD Blue	Anne Knepper	Episode: "Half-Ashed"
2003	Six Feet Under	Pink-Haired Girl	Episode: "The Eye Inside"
2003	Boston Public		Episode: "Chapter Sixty-One"
2003–2005	Joan of Arcadia	Glynis Figliola	23 episodes
2004–2008	The Shield	Farrah	2 episodes
2004	Strong Medicine	Trinity	Episode: "Omissions"
2005	Crossing Jordan	Laura Bennett	Episode: "Death Goes On"
2006	Half & Half	Ginny	Episode: "The Big Diva Down Episode"
2006	Cold Case	Crystal Eckersdorf	Episode: "Joseph"
2006	In from the Night	Priscilla Miller	TV movie
2007	Standoff	Gwen Keegan	Episode: "Road Trip"
2007	Private Practice	Rebecca Hobart	Episode: "In Which Addison Has a Very Casual Get Together"
2009	Bones	Madame Nina	Episode: "Double Trouble in the Panhandle"
2009	Lie to Me	Natalie	Episode: "Blinded"
2010	Southland	Misty	Episode: "Maximum Deployment"
2010–2011	Hung	Christina	3 episodes
2010	Chase	Missy	Episode: "Above the Law"
2011	Breakout Kings	Jill Kincaid	Episode: "Collected"
2011	The Mentalist	Constance	Episode: "Rhapsody in Red"
2011	American Horror Story: Murder House	Bianca	Episode: "Home Invasion"
2012	Shameless	Kim Furtado	Episode: "I'll Light a Candle for You Every Day"
2012	The Finder	Joyce Weatherby	Episode: "The Inheritance"
2012	CSI: NY	Eva Mason	Episode: "Reignited"
2012	Obama: What He's Done	Herself	TV movie
2013	Scandal	Molly Ackerman	2 episodes
2015	How to Get Away with Murder	Jolene Samuels	Episode: "Mama's Here Now"
2015	You're the Worst	Amy Cadingle	5 episodes
2016	Castle	Veronica Harris	Episode: "G.D.S."
2016–2020	The Magicians	Zelda Schiff, Head Librarian	24 episodes
2020	Heartbeats	Joyce Summers	3 episodes
2022	The Lincoln Lawyer	Wren Williams	2 episodes
