= Madison Davenport =

American actress (born 1996)

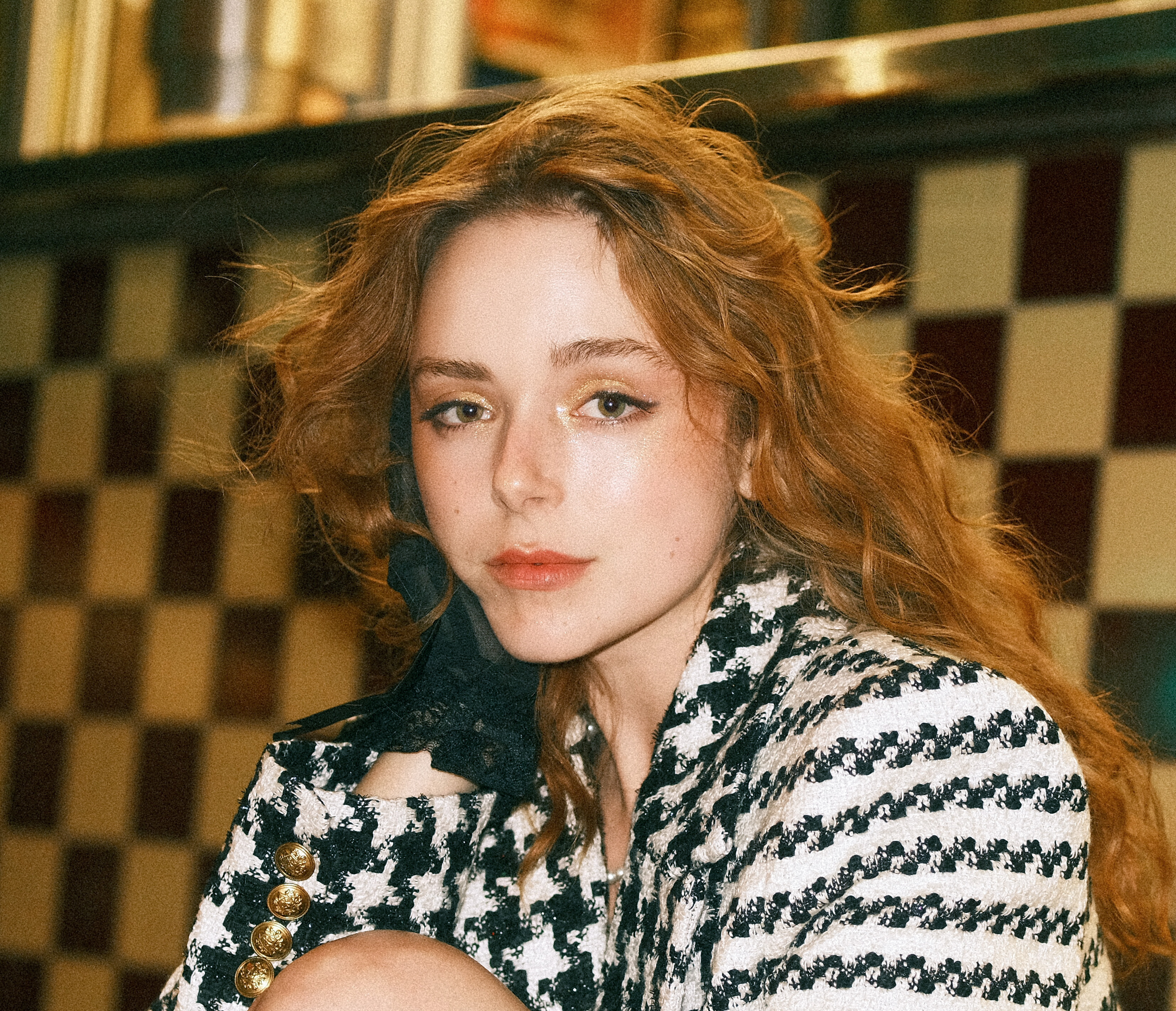
- Davenport in 2025
- Born: Madison Danielle Davenport; November 22, 1996 (age 29); San Antonio, Texas, U.S.
- Occupation: Actress
- Years active: 2005–present

Madison Danielle Davenport (born November 22, 1996) is an American actress, best known for her role as Beatrice in It's What's Inside and as Kate Fuller in From Dusk till Dawn: The Series. She also appeared in Kit Kittredge: An American Girl as Kit's friend Ruthie Smithens.

== Career ==
Davenport started her career in 2005 when she had a small role in Conversations with Other Women. Soon after she appeared in the television series Numb3rs, Close to Home, CSI: NY, Shameless, and Hot Properties.

In 2006, Davenport voiced the porcupine Quillo in Over the Hedge. She also had a guest starring role in Bones as Megan, a little girl who helps Temperance Brennan and Seeley Booth.

Davenport appeared in Legion of Super Heroes and While the Children Sleep in 2007. In 2008, Davenport was seen in ER and also had a voice over appearance in Special Agent Oso as Stacey & Fiona. She also had many film credits in 2008 including Humboldt County, Kit Kittredge: An American Girl, The Attic Door and Christmas Is Here Again.

In 2010, Davenport starred in the Lifetime television film Amish Grace, as Mary Beth Graber, a little girl who dies in a school shooting. She also played Destiny in Jack and the Beanstalk and had a leading role in the television film Dad's Home as Lindsay Westman.

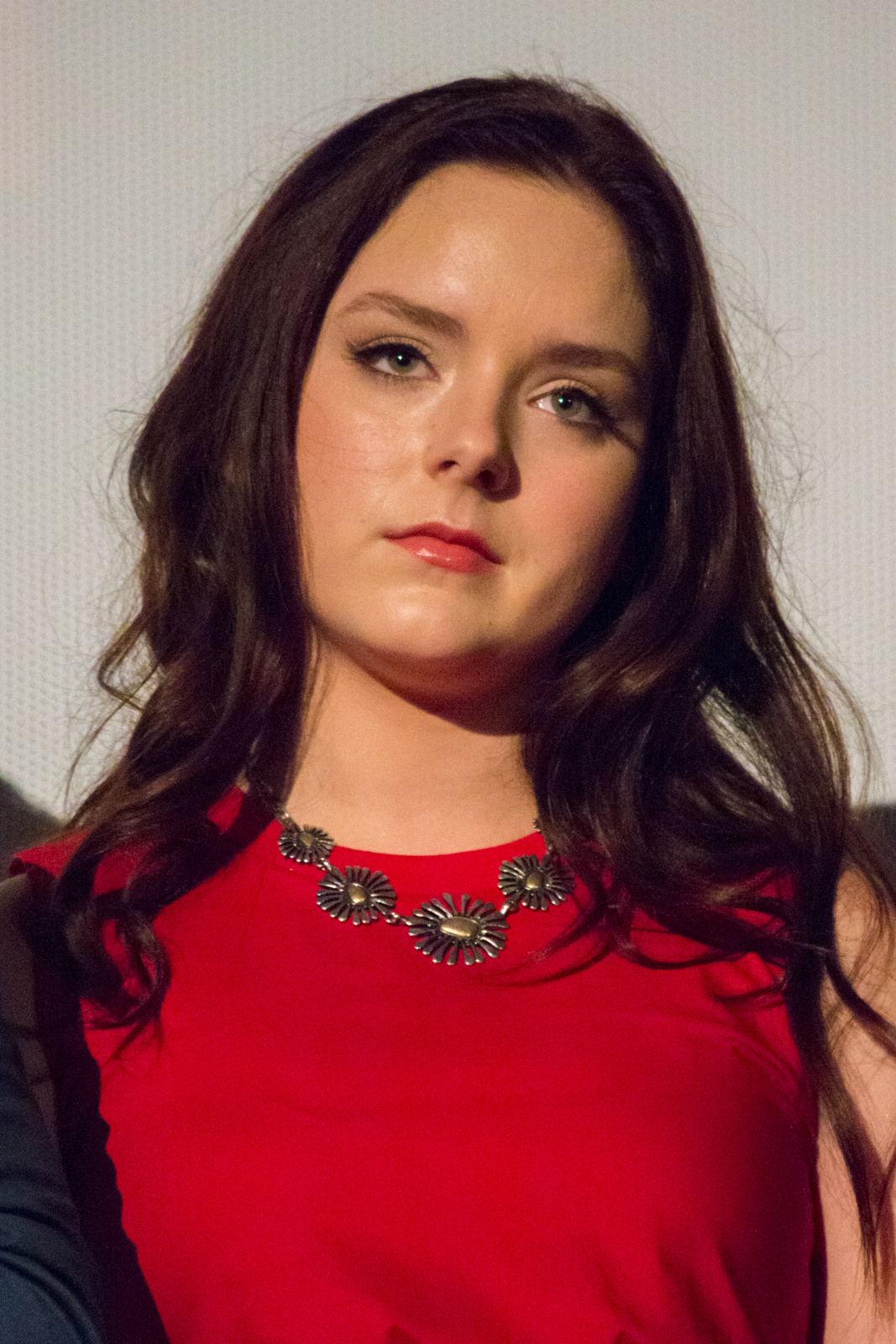
Davenport in 2015

In 2011, Davenport had a guest appearance in CSI: Crime Scene Investigation as father-murderer Camryn Pose and began a recurring role in the American television series Shameless. She played the supporting role of Hannah in the 2012 film The Possession.

Davenport played Na'el, a potential romantic partner of Ham (Logan Lerman), in the biblical epic film Noah, alongside Russell Crowe, Anthony Hopkins, Jennifer Connelly, and Emma Watson.

From 2014 to 2016, Davenport starred as Kate Fuller in From Dusk till Dawn: The Series, a remake of the 1996 film of the same name.

In 2018, Davenport starred in the HBO miniseries Sharp Objects. In 2019, she starred as Jack in "Rachel, Jack and Ashley Too", an episode of the anthology series Black Mirror. That year, she also starred in the Hulu series Reprisal.

In 2021, Davenport starred in the film Supercool.

== Personal life ==
In June 2022, Davenport came out as bisexual on her Instagram account.

== Filmography ==
=== Film ===
Year	Title	Role	Notes
2005	Conversations with Other Women	British Girl	
2006	Over the Hedge	Quillo (voice)	
2006	Hammy's Boomerang Adventure	Quillo (voice)	Short film
2006	Journey On Rio: Number Two	Bianca (voice)	
2007	Christmas Is Here Again	Sophiana (voice)	
2007	Dog Days III	Bianca (voice)	
2008	Horton Hears a Who!	Who Girl (voice)	
2008	Humboldt County	Charity	
2008	Kit Kittredge: An American Girl	Ruthie Smithens	Young Artist Award for Best Performance in a Feature Film – Young Ensemble Cast
2008	Parasomnia	Young Laura Baxter	
2009	The Attic Door	Caroline	
2010	Jack and the Beanstalk	Destiny	Direct-to-video
2012	The Possession	Hannah Brenek	
2014	Noah	Na'el	
2015	Sisters	Hayley	
2015	A Light Beneath Their Feet	Beth Gerringson	
2021	Supercool	Summer	
2024	It's What's Inside	Beatrice Blomquist	
2026	Hungry	Sistine	

=== Television ===
Year	Title	Role	Notes
2005	Numb3rs	Julia Rausch	Episode: "Better or Worse"
2005	Close to Home	Katie	Episode: "Pilot"
2005	CSI: NY	Abby Drake	Episode: "City of the Dolls"
2005	Hot Properties	Hannah	Episode: "It's a Wonderful Christmas Carol on 34th Street"
2006	Bones	Megan	Episode: "The Girl with the Curl"
2007	Legion of Super Heroes	Abel (voice)	Episode: "Unnatural Alliances"
2007	While the Children Sleep	Casey Eastman	Television film
2008	Special Agent Oso	Stacey, Fiona (voice)	Episode: "To Grandma with Love/Gold Flower"
2008	ER	Claire O'Fallon	Episode: "Parental Guidance"
2010	Amish Grace	Mary Beth Graber	Television film
2010	Dad's Home	Lindsay Westman	Television film
2011	CSI: Crime Scene Investigation	Camryn Pose	Episode: "All That Cremains"
2011–2012	Shameless	Ethel	Recurring role
2011	House	Iris	Episode: "Dead & Buried"
2013	Save Me	Emily Harper	Main role
2013	Criminal Minds	Samantha Wilcox	Episode: "Route 66"
2014–2016	From Dusk till Dawn: The Series	Kate Fuller / Amaru	Main role
2015	1 Chisper	Frakie	Television film
2018	Sharp Objects	Ashley Wheeler	Main role
2019	Black Mirror	Jack	Episode: "Rachel, Jack and Ashley Too"
2019	Reprisal	Meredith Harlow	Main role

=== Video games ===
Year	Title	Voice role	Notes
2006	Over the Hedge	Quillo	
2018	Dissidia Final Fantasy NT	Materia	
2019	Kingdom Hearts III	Nameless Star	
2020	Kingdom Hearts: Melody of Memory	Nameless Star	
