= Zach McGowan =

American actor

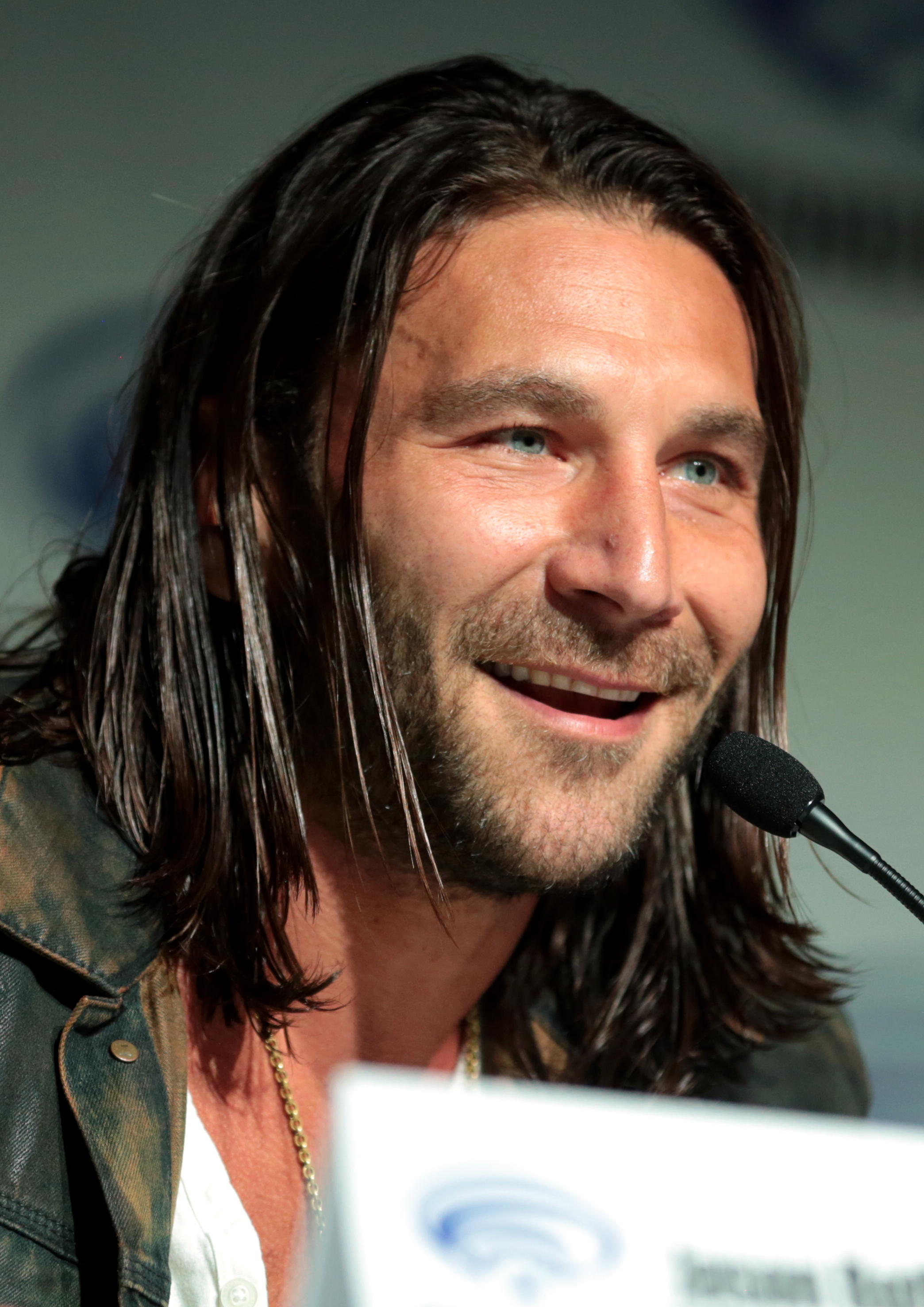
- McGowan at the 2018 WonderCon
- Citizenship: Ireland; United States
- Occupation: Actor
- Years active: 2004–present
- Spouse: Emily Johnson (m. 2008)
- Children: 4

Zach McGowan is an American film, television and voice actor. He is known for his roles in television series The Boys and Gen V as Dogknott, Agents of S.H.I.E.L.D. as Anton Ivanov / The Superior, Shameless, Black Sails, and The 100. Other highlights include parts in the films Terminator Salvation, The Hunt for Eagle One, the sequel The Hunt for Eagle One: Crash Point and The Scorpion King: Book of Souls. He guest-starred in the television series Numbers, CSI: Miami, and Cold Case, with voice-over work for the Scream Awards, Animal Planet and the video games Tom Clancy's Ghost Recon: Future Soldier, Resident Evil 6, and Iron Man.

== Early life ==
McGowan was raised in Upper West Side, Manhattan. He attended Ethical Culture Fieldston School from kindergarten through senior year in high school, where he was the captain of the football and ice hockey teams and a member of the drama and theater societies. He graduated in 2002 from Carleton College. His mother is of Ashkenazi Jewish descent while his father is Irish American.

== Career ==
In mid-2011, McGowan joined the cast of the Showtime dramedy Shameless, as Jody, first as a guest star (season 2) and then as a series regular (season 3). Season two premiered January 8, 2012. He said that modeling for art students helped him for the role and now "nudity is just part of the job".

In July 2013, McGowan joined the cast of the Universal Pictures feature film Dracula Untold, playing Shkelgim, a mysterious Romani.

In January 2014, McGowan joined the cast of the Starz dramatic adventure TV series Black Sails, playing a fictionalized version of the real-life 18th-century English pirate Charles Vane. The role called for an English actor, so McGowan, an American, affected an accent. Casting directors found out later that McGowan was faking but were impressed with his performance and chose him for the role.

In July 2016, McGowan joined the cast of The CW science fiction TV series The 100, playing King Roan of the Ice Nation, after having previously played the role as a guest star.

In January 2017, McGowan joined the cast of the ABC TV series Agents of S.H.I.E.L.D., playing villain Anton Ivanov / The Superior.

In March 2018, McGowan joined the cast of L.A.'s Finest, a TV series based on the Bad Boys franchise, alongside Jessica Alba and Gabrielle Union. He starred in the leading role of Death Race: Beyond Anarchy, the 4th instalment of the Death Race (franchise). In 2019, he was the lead in The Scorpion King: Book of Souls with both films being directed by Don Michael Paul.

== Personal life ==
McGowan married Emily Johnson on September 27, 2008, in the Santa Barbara mountains.

== Filmography ==
=== Film ===
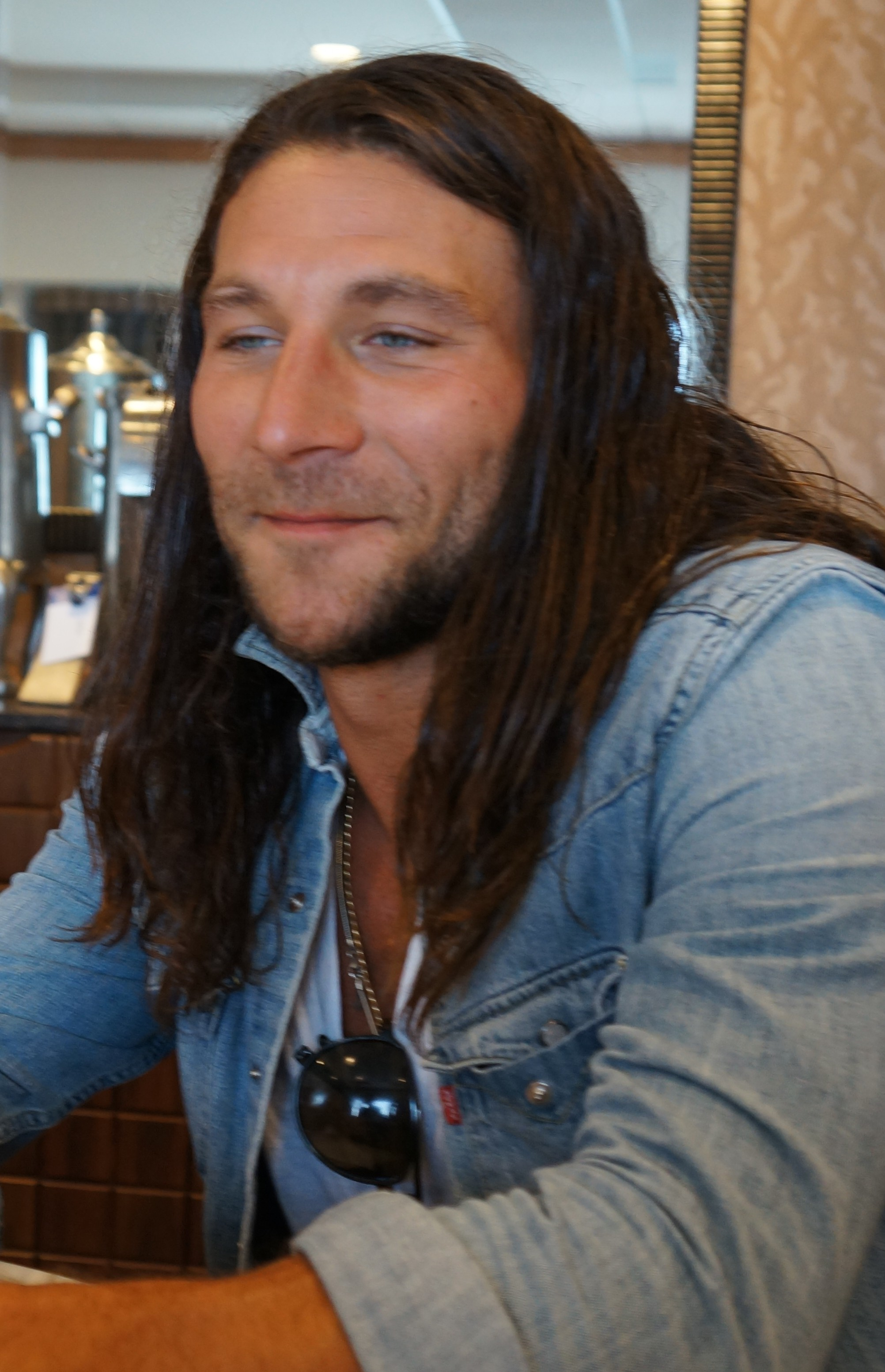
McGowan at the 2013 San Diego Comic-Con.

Year	Title	Role	Notes
2006	The Hunt for Eagle One	Hank Jackson	Direct-to-DVD
2006	The Hunt for Eagle One: Crash Point	Hank Jackson	Direct-to-DVD
2009	Terminator Salvation	Soldier on Osprey	
2009	Losing Control	Terry	
2009	Conception	Joel	
2012	Cockroaches	Johnny Slim	
2012	Snapshot	Thomas Grady	
2014	Dracula Untold	Shkelgim	
2018	The Brawler	Chuck Wepner	
2018	Death Race: Beyond Anarchy	Connor Gibson	Direct-to-DVD
2018	The Scorpion King: Book of Souls	Mathayus	Direct-to-DVD
2019	Robert the Bruce	Brandubh	
2021	Last Call	Laurence "Dougal" McDougal Jr.	
2022	Murder at Yellowstone City	Robert Dunnigan	
2022	Sanctioning Evil	Congressman Dakota Ambrose	
2024	Compulsion	Reese	
2026	The Wolf and the Lamb	Sheriff Frank Martin	

=== Television ===
Year	Title	Role	Notes	Ref(s)
2007	Two Dudes Catering	Himself	TV reality show	
2008	CSI: Miami	Kurt Greenfield	Episode: "Wrecking Crew"	
2008	Numbers	Keith Jackson	Episode: "High Exposure"	
2009	Scream Awards	Announcer/Narrator		
2009	Cold Case	Corporal Clerk	Episode: "Libertyville"	
2010	Good Luck Charlie	Happy Horse	Episode: "Butt Dialing Duncans"	
2011	Man Eating Super Snake	Voice	TV movie	
2011	Body of Proof	Vincent Stone	Episode: "Helping Hand"	
2011	Scream Awards	Announcer/Narrator		
2012	Dating Rules from My Future Self	Jagger	2 episodes	
2012–2013	Shameless	Jody Silverman	24 episodes Recurring role (season 2); Main role (season 3)	
2014–2016	Black Sails	Charles Vane	28 episodes Main Cast (seasons 1–3)	
2015	Law & Order: Special Victims Unit	Anton	Episode: "Maternal Instincts"	
2016	UnREAL	Brock	Episode: "Casualty"	
2016–2017; 2020	The 100	Roan	Recurring role (season 3); Main cast (season 4); Guest star (season 7); 17 episodes	
2017	Lethal Weapon	Cody Lewis	Episode: "Birdwatching"	
2017–2018	Damnation	Tennyson Duvall	2 episodes	
2017–2018	Agents of S.H.I.E.L.D.	Anton Ivanov / The Superior	Recurring role (season 4); Guest star (season 5); 8 episodes	
2018	The Walking Dead	Justin	Recurring role (season 9); 3 episodes	
2019	L.A.'s Finest	Ray Sherman	2 episodes	
2020	Project Blue Book	Duncan Booker	Episode: "Roswell Incident Part I & Part II"	
2020	MacGyver	Roman	3 episodes	
2022	Blood & Treasure	Andrei Levchenko	2 episodes	
2023	The Rookie: Feds	Jason Simmons	1 episode	
2024–2026	The Boys	Dogknott	3 episodes	
2025	Gen V	Dogknott	2 episodes	

=== Video games ===
Year	Title	Voice role	Ref.
2008	Boom Blox	Cowboy Beaver	
2008	Iron Man	Mark Scarlotti / Whiplash / Stark Engineer	
2012	Tom Clancy's Ghost Recon: Future Soldier	Ghost	
2012	Anarchy Reigns	Nikolai Dmitri Bulygin, additional voices	
2012	Resident Evil 6	BSAA	
