= Down Like the Titanic =

- Shameless episode
- Episode no.: Season 9 Episode 7
- Directed by: Silver Tree
- Written by: Molly Smith Metzler
- Cinematography by: Anthony Hardwick
- Editing by: Mark Strand
- Original release date: October 21, 2018
- Running time: 58 minutes

Guest appearances
- Katey Sagal as Ingrid Jones (special guest star); Neal Bledsoe as Max Whitford; Andy Buckley as Randy; Scott Michael Campbell as Brad; Patrick Davis Alarcón as Jason; Jess Gabor as Kelly Keefe; Kate Miner as Tami Tamietti; Ashley Romans as Alex; Jim Hoffmaster as Kermit; Michael Patrick McGill as Tommy; Peter Banifaz as Farhad; Paget Kagy as Jazmin; J. P. Manoux as Zach

Episode chronology
← Previous "Face It, You're Gorgeous"	Next → "The Apple Doesn't Fall Far from the Alibi"
- Shameless season 9

"Down Like the Titanic" is the seventh episode of the ninth season of the American television comedy drama Shameless, an adaptation of the British series of the same name. It is the 103rd overall episode of the series and was written by producer Molly Smith Metzler, and directed by Silver Tree. It originally aired on Showtime on October 21, 2018.

The series is set on the South Side of Chicago, Illinois, and depicts the poor, dysfunctional family of Frank Gallagher, a neglectful single father of six: Fiona, Phillip, Ian, Debbie, Carl, and Liam. He spends his days drunk, high, or in search of money, while his children need to learn to take care of themselves. In the episode, Fiona goes on a downward spiral, while Frank gets romantically involved with Ingrid.

According to Nielsen Media Research, the episode was seen by an estimated 1.00 million household viewers and gained a 0.33 ratings share among adults aged 18–49. The episode received positive reviews from critics, who considered it an improvement over the previous episodes of the season.

== Plot ==
The Gallaghers are awakened at 2am by the sound of an alarm. Lip (Jeremy Allen White) climbs to the attic, and discovers that the alarm was set up by Ian, who left a photo along with a note that reads "Miss me yet?" They smile at the gesture before returning to sleep.

Frank (William H. Macy) spends more time with Ingrid (Katey Sagal), convincing her to stop using her medication. This alarms Randy (Andy Buckley), who warns Frank that his relationship with Ingrid will worsen if she does not take the medication. Frank ignores it and accompanies Ingrid to her office, where she works as a psychiatrist. While she tends to a patient, Frank distracts her by performing oral sex under her desk. In the wake of her break-up and accident, Fiona (Emmy Rossum) starts heavily drinking and ignoring her family's concerns. In debt, Fiona puts the apartment building up for sale. Max (Neal Bledsoe) offers her to buy the apartment building for the $285,000, maintaining her credit. Fiona accepts, and moves back into the Gallagher household.

While cleaning the house, Kevin (Steve Howey) tells Veronica (Shanola Hampton) that he is ready to have a new child in their lives. When Veronica makes it clear she does not want more babies, Kevin falls into a depression, affecting business at the Alibi. Kelly (Jess Gabor) helps Carl (Ethan Cutkosky) in preparing for West Point, but they both discover that he will not have trouble getting enrolled. Liam is frustrated by the experience, but finds a possible summer job. Lip (Jeremy Allen White) attends Brad and Cami's christening and reunites with Tami (Kate Miner); the two reconcile and have sex.

Randy pleads Frank to stop inferfering in Ingrid's life, but Frank instead manipulates him into taking vacations, leaving him in charge of Ingrid's condition. After consideration, Veronica tells Kevin that while she will not give birth to another child, she is open to adoption, pleasing him. Debbie (Emma Kenney) leads Fiona to Patsy's, revealing that she and her friends caught Ford (Richard Flood) and locked him in a pillory to be humiliated with his pants down. Fiona throws a paintball in his bottom, and she laughs. Back at home, however, Fiona dejectedly drinks outside.

== Production ==
=== Development ===
The episode was written by producer Molly Smith Metzler, and directed by Silver Tree. It was Smith Metzler's third writing credit, and Tree's first directing credit.

== Reception ==
=== Viewers ===
In its original American broadcast, "Down Like the Titanic" was seen by an estimated 1.00 million household viewers with a 0.33 in the 18–49 demographics. This means that 0.33 percent of all households with televisions watched the episode. This was an 8 percent increase in viewership from the previous episode, which was seen by an estimated 0.92 million household viewers with a 0.30 in the 18–49 demographics.

=== Critical reviews ===
"Down Like the Titanic" received positive reviews from critics. Myles McNutt of The A.V. Club gave the episode a "B" grade and wrote, "the back half of season nine in 2019 will represent a grand experiment in trying to extend the life of a series that all evidence suggests should not move forward, one that I'll be investigating closely as the end of Fiona Gallagher's journey beckons."

Derek Lawrence of Entertainment Weekly wrote "While Cameron Monaghan's absence was felt, Shameless was still as shameless as ever, between Frank pretending to be a psychiatrist as he got sexually pleasured and Debbie pulling off the ultimate revenge on the behalf of her big sister."

David Crow of Den of Geek gave the episode a 4 star rating out of 5 and wrote "At least this week, the curve felt natural and a paintball to the ass is worth grading this one at least a half-star higher than it would otherwise deserve." Kimberly Ricci of Uproxx wrote "Really, it's anyone's guess how they'll send off such an instrumental character. My take? They'll finally bring back Jimmy/Steve for an episode, and the two will leave to build a new life together. Clearly, she deserves that happy ending, given that the series has proven inept at giving Fiona her due even when she's riding high."

Tamar Barbash of Telltale TV gave the episode a 2 star rating out of 5 and wrote "Unfortunately, this episode lacks a lot of the staples we've come to expect from a finale. Namely, nothing that happened in this finale leaves anything to be excited about in the back half of the season." Christopher Dodson of Show Snob wrote "There is a disturbance looming in our regularly scheduled Gallagher programming but Shameless will be back in January. Until then, sound the Shameless alarms, like a sweet annoying Ian reminder from prison."

Jade Budowski of Decider wrote "Shameless won't be back until January, but we sure hope Emmy Rossum's last few episodes aren't a continuation of his heartbreaking horror show." Paul Dailly of TV Fanatic gave the episode a 4.25 star rating out of 5, and wrote, "Fiona has been trying for years to leave her humble beginnings behind, and that's why it was so heartbreaking to watch this character lose everything."
