= Shameless season 9 =

Shameless
- Season 9
- Promotional poster
- Showrunner: John Wells
- Starring: William H. Macy; Emmy Rossum; Jeremy Allen White; Ethan Cutkosky; Shanola Hampton; Steve Howey; Emma Kenney; Cameron Monaghan; Richard Flood; Christian Isaiah
- No. of episodes: 14

Release
- Original network: Showtime
- Original release: September 9, 2018 – March 10, 2019

Season chronology
- ← Previous; Season 8 Next → Season 10

The ninth season of Shameless, an American comedy-drama television series based on the British series of the same name by Paul Abbott, was announced on November 8, 2017, following the season 8 premiere. The season premiered on September 9, 2018, and consisted of 14 episodes, split into two seven-episode parts. The second half of the season premiered on January 20, 2019. The season also includes the 100th episode of the series.

On August 30, 2018, Emmy Rossum announced that she would leave the series following the ninth season. On October 7, 2018, Cameron Monaghan announced that the sixth episode of the season would be his last one. However, Monaghan appeared in "Found", the season finale, and returned to the series in season ten. Christian Isaiah and Richard Flood, who portray Liam Gallagher and Ford Kellogg respectively, were promoted to the main cast.

== Plot ==
The ninth season of Shameless picks up with the aftermath of Ian's arrest: Fiona attempts to pay for Ian's bail by getting the apartment building appraised, while Ian becomes a leader for the gay inmates in prison. His court date impending, Ian is encouraged by his followers to take the case to trial to further publicize the Gay Jesus movement. Facing ten to thirteen years if he takes the case to trial, Ian—under Fiona's advice—decides to plead not guilty by reason of insanity; he is ultimately sentenced to two years in prison. Ian discovers that Mickey is his prison cellmate, and the reunited lovers rekindle their relationship.

Lip works towards becoming Xan's legal guardian, and bribes Xan's biological mother Mercy into granting him custody. However, when Xan has a heartfelt reunion with Mercy, Lip realizes that Xan would rather live with her mother. Later in the season, Lip begins dating Cami's sister Tami (Kate Miner), whom he initially met at Brad's wedding. Meanwhile, Debbie begins expressing an attraction to women, pursuing a relationship with a lesbian co-worker, Alex (Ashley Romans). Debbie later develops a crush on Carl's new girlfriend Kelly, though Kelly rejects Debbie's advances. At the ER, Frank meets Dr. Ingrid Jones (Katey Sagal), a mentally unstable therapist who wants to have children. Frank impregnates Ingrid with septuplets, but Ingrid leaves Frank for her ex-husband.

Fiona and Ford's relationship strains when she makes a deal with investor Max Whitford (Neal Bledsoe) and invests $100,000 into a senior living home being built in the neighborhood. After meeting with Max, Fiona discovers she owes a $25,000 expansion for the senior living home, and is unable to take back her initial investment. In addition to her financial troubles, Fiona’s problems are compounded when she, after tracking Ford’s cell phone, discovers that Ford has a secret wife and kid. Drunk and furious, Fiona angrily ends her relationship with Ford and crashes her car into a nearby vehicle.

Ford's revelation spurs Fiona into a downwards spiral. She goes on a drinking binge, and her constant drunkenness causes her to get fired from Patsy's. With Fiona's absence, Debbie begins taking charge at the Gallagher home. In order to maintain her credit, Max offers to buy Fiona's apartment building, which is subsequently demolished. Meanwhile, Xan returns to the Gallagher home after being abandoned by Mercy. Lip plans to adopt Xan, but his chances are ruined when a drunken Fiona answers the door during an unannounced DCFS visit. The DCFS worker concludes the Gallagher home unsuitable for Xan, and she is transferred to a foster home. Attempting to apologize to Lip, Fiona visits Brad's motorcycle shop and meets Lip's sponsor, Jason, who has recently celebrated 100 days of sobriety. Unaware of Jason's sobriety, Fiona drinks vodka in front of Jason, causing him to relapse. Lip blames Fiona for both incidents and angrily kicks her out of the house.

Following the fallout between her and Lip, Fiona begins attending AA meetings and is able to make amends with Lip and her former co-workers. Meanwhile, Lip discovers that Tami is pregnant, and contemplates whether he will be a good father. Fiona briefly reunites with Max, who offers to buy her out of her $100,000 investment. Now with a chance to get her life back on track, Fiona decides she needs a fresh start and announces her plans to leave Chicago. She visits Ian in prison, who is supportive of her decision. Fiona also shares a brief moment with Frank, who thanks her for taking care of the kids following Monica's departure. Fiona angrily replies that she didn't just 'help' but did it all. Frank shrugs this off by saying 'If you sleep better believing that....'

The Gallaghers plan a goodbye party for Fiona, but she departs before the party begins. Debbie finds an envelope of $50,000 that Fiona left on the kitchen fridge. Fiona hops on a plane going to an unknown destination, finally ready to start her life anew.

== Cast and characters ==
=== Main ===
- William H. Macy as Frank Gallagher
- Emmy Rossum as Fiona Gallagher
- Jeremy Allen White as Philip "Lip" Gallagher
- Ethan Cutkosky as Carl Gallagher
- Shanola Hampton as Veronica "V" Fisher
- Steve Howey as Kevin "Kev" Ball
- Emma Kenney as Debbie Gallagher
- Cameron Monaghan as Ian Gallagher (episodes 1–6, 14)
- Richard Flood as Ford Kellogg (episodes 1–7, 9)
- Christian Isaiah as Liam Gallagher

=== Special guest ===
- Dan Lauria as Maurice "Mo" White
- Katey Sagal as Ingrid Jones
- Courteney Cox as Jen Wagner
- Luis Guzmán as Mikey O'Shea
- Noel Fisher as Mickey Milkovich

=== Recurring ===
- Kate Miner as Tami Tamietti
- Scott Michael Campbell as Brad
- Amirah Johnson as Alexandra "Xan" Galvez
- Michael Patrick McGill as Tommy
- Jim Hoffmaster as Kermit
- Peter Banifaz as Farhad
- Melissa Paladino as Cami Tamietti
- David Bowe as Bob Tamietti
- Jennifer Taylor as Anne Seery
- Juliette Angelo as Geneva
- Neal Bledsoe as Max Whitford
- Ashley Romans as Alex
- Patrick Davis Alarcón as Jason
- Paul Dooley as Ralph
- Caroline Choi as Sister Frances
- Ozie Nzeribe as Todd
- Steven M. Porter as Craig
- Dennis Cockrum as Terry Milkovich
- Jess Gabor as Kelly Keefe
- Brent Huff as Major Samuel Keefe
- Andy Buckley as Randy
- Rebecca Field as Eliza
- Joy Osmanski as Dr. Kwan
- Paton Ashbrook as Ryan
- Zach Villa as Dax
- Anthony Gonzalez as Santiago
- Maddie McCormick as Corey Tamietti
- Sarah Colonna as Lori
- Eddie Alfano as K.J.

=== Guests ===
- Sammi Hanratty as Kassidi Gallagher
- Jessica Szohr as Nessa Chabon
- Perry Mattfeld as Mel
- Bob Saget as Father D'Amico
- Sharon Lawrence as Margo Mierzejewski

== Episodes ==
No. overall	No. in season	Title	Directed by	Written by	Original release date	U.S. viewers (millions)
97	1	"Are You There Shim? It's Me, Ian"	Iain B. MacDonald	Nancy M. Pimental	September 9, 2018	1.31
Ian continues his Gay Jesus antics in prison, becoming a leader for the gay inmates. In an attempt to raise money for Ian's bail, Fiona gets the apartment building appraised; Ford disapproves of Fiona's decision, as he believes Ian is too impulsive. Fiona is concerned when she finds out Ford has a second phone, although Ford claims it is an international phone used to call his mom. Most of the parents at Liam's school, Hopkins Academy, test positive for STDs, and it is revealed that Frank had extramarital affairs with all the infected women. Debbie fights for equal pay at work after finding out she is being paid less. Lip attends Brad and Cami's wedding and has sex with Cami's sister, Tami. A couple days later, Lip shows up at Tami's salon to ask her out, but Tami shuts him down. Kevin and Veronica have trouble getting the twins to sleep. Carl wants to get rid of Kassidi, who has set up camp outside the military school. Carl later finds out that a fellow cadet, wanting to help Carl, had killed Kassidi and buried her body.
98	2	"Mo White!"	Erin Feeley	Molly Smith Metzler	September 16, 2018	1.12
While trying to find a preschool for the twins, Kevin and Veronica come across an affordable Catholic preschool. When they discover the school only has one slot left, Kevin and Veronica get Gemma and Amy to pretend to be one girl. Liam gets kicked out of Hopkins Academy because of the STD incident with Frank. Fiona takes Liam to help look for investment opportunities and meets skeezy investor Max Whitford. Against Ford's advice, Fiona makes a $100,000 investment with Max into an upcoming retirement home. Frank makes money by field working in local political campaigns. When the campaigns fire Frank for more diversity hires, Frank gets the white patrons at the Alibi to nominate Republican representative Mo White for the political race. Carl considers going to West Point, but learns he has to do a lot more to have any chance of admission. Debbie continues to protest for women rights. Xan steals a woman's wallet, wanting to give the money to her mom. At Brad's advice, Lip decides to sponsor Jason, a new AA member. Ian is released from jail after his Gay Jesus followers pay for his bail.
99	3	"Weirdo Gallagher Vortex"	Kat Coiro	Joe Lawson	September 23, 2018	1.05
Following his release, Ian searches for religious inspiration. Liam begins attending a new public school and makes a deal with another student for protection against Sissy, a bully. Carl wants to get a recommendation to West Point from a local congressman. Veronica discovers that she used to be the congressman's dominatrix, and she successfully gets the congressman to write the recommendation. Kevin works to make the guys at the Alibi more respectful towards women. Frank continues to campaign for Mo White, but discovers that Mo was a former sex offender. Fiona and Ford disagree over Fiona's investment into the retirement home. When Xan breaks her arm, Lip is unable to release her from the hospital, as he is not her legal guardian; Lip is able to leave with Xan by pulling the plug on another patient, creating a distraction. Debbie befriends Alex, one of her female co-workers, and the two later share a kiss.
100	4	"Do Right, Vote White!"	Mark Mylod	John Wells	September 30, 2018	1.09
As Election Day approaches, Fiona plans to vote for Ruiz, because he is against rent control, but Ford convinces her to vote for another candidate. Frank and Mo gain last minute voters, resulting in Mo winning the election. Debbie and Alex briefly move in together, but Alex believes Debbie to be straight. Gay Jesus builds an international following, and Ian struggles to find his role in it. Ian's followers want him to take his case to trial, in order to publicize the Gay Jesus movement, but Ian could potentially face up to ten years in prison in doing so. Liam learns his school wants to move him up a couple of grades for the next school year. Carl is challenged to a duel for his West Point recommendation letter and worries he's gone soft because of his volunteer work. Kevin and Veronica embrace the clientele change at the bar. Xan's mother Mercy returns, and Lip offers her $10,000 to sign away her parental rights and grant him custody. Xan sees Mercy and embraces her; Lip gives Mercy the money and leaves, realizing Xan would rather live with her mother.
101	5	"Black-Haired Ginger"	William H. Macy	Philip Buiser	October 7, 2018	1.00
Carl attends a West Point luncheon where he meets Kelly, who mistakenly believes he took advantage of her when she passed out from drinking. Debbie tries to make amends with Alex. Questioning her sexuality, Debbie seeks advice from Nessa and Mel. Lip gets an unexpected day off and struggles to maintain his sobriety. Sissy makes a move on Liam, then tries to convince him he got her pregnant. Kevin is asked to speak at a women's convention and becomes more aware of the dangers of being female. Frank's new anti-rejection drug has a negative side effect on his sex drive. Fiona and Ford fight, then make up. Ian struggles to decide how to plead at court; Fiona tries to convince him to plead not guilty by reason of insanity. Ian dyes his hair black and initially plans to run away, but he ultimately returns home. At his court appearance, Ian takes Fiona's advice and pleads insanity.
102	6	"Face It, You're Gorgeous"	Allison Liddi-Brown	Nancy M. Pimental	October 14, 2018	0.92
Kevin and Veronica consider their lifestyle choices when their daughter brings a dildo to show and tell. Lip spends the day as a sober coach for Jen Wagner, a famous celebrity. Frank searches for a new "Monica" and meets Ingrid Jones, a psych ward patient. Frank follows Ingrid to her house and flirts with her. Max informs Fiona that the retirement home investment needs an influx of $25,000. When she isn't able to take back the initial $100,000 investment, Fiona decides against moving in with Ford, causing an argument. Later, unable to find Ford, Fiona tracks his phone to an unknown house; Fiona visits the house and discovers that Ford has a secret wife and kid. Drunk and furious, Fiona ends their relationship and crashes her car into a nearby vehicle. Ian, sentenced to two years in prison, has an emotional goodbye with his siblings. Upon arriving at the prison, Ian finds out that his cellmate is Mickey; the reunited lovers share a kiss.
103	7	"Down Like the Titanic"	Silver Tree	Molly Smith Metzler	October 21, 2018	1.00
Following the revelation of Ford's secret wife and kid, Fiona goes on a downward spiral, indulging in alcohol binges. In debt, Fiona puts the apartment building up for sale; Max offers to buy the apartment building for the $285K, maintaining her credit. Fiona accepts the offer and reluctantly moves back into the Gallagher home. Ian leaves a gift to his family to remember him by. Frank and Ingrid pursue a sexual relationship, while Ingrid's ex-husband Randy tries to get her back on her meds. Frank convinces Randy to take a vacation. Liam finds a summer job, while Carl studies for West Point with Kelly and Liam. Kevin and Veronica have a discussion over having another child; Veronica reveals that she is open to adopting. Lip attends Brad and Cami's christening and reunites with Tami; the two reconcile and have sex. Debbie and some of her fellow welders decide to teach Ford a lesson by forcing him to publicly stand on a sign with his pants down, pleasing Fiona.
104	8	"The Apple Doesn't Fall Far from the Alibi"	Zetna Fuentes	Joe Lawson	January 20, 2019	0.80
Fiona continues her downward spiral, vandalizing the site of the upcoming retirement home and continuing to indulge in alcohol. In Fiona's absence, Debbie steps in to pick up the slack at the Gallagher house, managing the family's finances and restarting the Squirrel Fund. Max has announced plans to demolish the apartment building. Tami shows Lip a different version of adulthood, checking out apartments for the both of them. Tami visits the Gallaghers and learns of Lip's family situation. Kevin and Veronica adopt a 12-year-old boy named Santiago, who does not speak English. Kevin and Veronica learn that Santiago got separated from his family while seeking asylum at the border. Ingrid tells Frank that she wants to have children; Frank agrees. When Frank discovers that he has a low sperm count, Frank tricks Carl into giving him a sample of his sperm; Frank then uses Carl's sperm to impregnate Ingrid.
105	9	"BOOOOOOOOOOOONE!"	Loren Yaconelli	Philip Buiser	January 27, 2019	0.84
Debbie takes her new role as head of the Gallagher house by demanding each family member pay their equal share, rationing each of the utilities, and changing the locks when a sibling fails to meet their requirements. Forced to contribute to the Squirrel Fund, Liam begins raising money with the help of Santiago. Veronica and Kevin, determined to reunite Santiago with his family, travel to Indiana to find Santiago's poor uncle. In the process, they accidentally out Santiago's uncle to the police. Fiona's anger issues cause problems at Patsy's, and she begins taking boxing lessons to let out her anger. Carl meets Kelly's father, who does not approve of their relationship. Carl decides he can't keep seeing Kelly in good faith, so as not to keep her from achieving her dreams. Ingrid learns that she is pregnant with sextuplets, and Frank searches for ways to finance Ingrid's vision for their future together. Lip is forced to confront his real feelings for Tami when he meets Tami's ex-boyfriend Boone. Jealous of Boone, Lip hooks up with Tami's sister, but quickly confesses his mistake to Tami. The incident unexpectedly brings Lip and Tami closer.
106	10	"Los Diablos!"	Roberto Sneider	Nancy M. Pimental	February 10, 2019	1.14
In an effort to support Ingrid, Frank competes in the Hobo Loco competition, hoping to become the Hobo Loco liquor spokesperson. Frank bonds with his fellow competitor, Mikey. At Patsy's, Fiona has a dark encounter with three men breaking in. The break-in scares Fiona into turning her life around; she throws away her alcohol and returns to work with a new attitude. However, it is too late, and Margo shows up at Patsy's to fire Fiona. Kevin and Veronica say goodbye to Santiago, who is moving to Guatemala with his sister. Debbie throws herself into home improvements as she gets closer with Kelly. Carl gets a job as a sign spinner for a local restaurant. Lip and Tami spend the day together. Xan, having been abandoned by Mercy, returns to the Gallagher house and reunites with Lip. Liam opens a lemonade stand, but a racist neighbor calls the cops on him. When Fiona discovers this, she rallies the neighborhood and drunkenly punches the racist neighbor, resulting in Fiona getting arrested.
107	11	"The Hobo Games"	Iain B. MacDonald	Molly Smith Metzler	February 17, 2019	0.97
The finals of the Hobo Games have arrived, and Frank faces off Mikey in the competition. Ingrid begins to have doubts about Frank's capabilities, and ultimately leaves Frank for Randy, informing Frank that she plans to reduce the embryos. Fiona has been charged with assault for punching the neighbor. Carl grows concerned when Debbie develops a crush on Kelly. Veronica wants Kevin to get a vasectomy. Kevin does not go through with the vasectomy operation, but he later lies to Veronica, claiming that he did. Tami reveals her pregnancy to Lip. DCFS makes an unexpected visit to the Gallagher home, and a drunken Fiona answers the door. Noticing Fiona's drunken state, the DCFS inspector concludes the Gallagher home an unsuitable environment for Xan, ruining Lip's plans to foster her. Fiona shows up at Brad's shop to apologize to Lip, and ends up running into Jason, who is celebrating 100 days of sobriety. Fiona drinks vodka in front of Jason, causing him to relapse. Lip blames Fiona for Jason's relapse and angrily kicks her out of the house.
108	12	"You'll Know the Bottom When You Hit It"	Shari Springer Berman & Robert Pulcini	Joe Lawson	February 24, 2019	0.81
After kicking out Fiona, Lip throws Fiona's personal belongings out of the Gallagher house. Veronica initially invites Fiona to stay at her house, but Lip advises Veronica against doing so, believing Fiona will only get better if she hits rock bottom. Carl grows suspicious of Debbie's attempts to get closer with Kelly. Kelly is appalled that Carl believes she'd be attracted to Debbie and breaks up with him. Kevin has his vasectomy. Lip says goodbye to Xan and confronts Tami about her pregnancy; Tami reveals that she is contemplating keeping the baby. When a blackout unexpectedly hits the South Side, Kevin and Veronica come up with an impromptu cookout to bring the neighborhood together. Fiona and Frank team up to take advantage of the blackout, selling supplies to their South Side neighbors in order to get money for alcohol. Unable to stay with Veronica, Fiona sleeps in her old apartment building with Frank. The next morning, Fiona breaks down, realizing that she has hit rock bottom, and decides to attend the AA meetings with Lip.
109	13	"Lost"	Iain B. MacDonald	John Wells	March 3, 2019	1.13
Frank, still squatting in the vacant apartment, severely injures his leg when the building is demolished. He arrives at the hospital for his leg injury, but the doctors are reluctant to treat him, as he has over $85,000 in unpaid bills. Fiona attempts to get her life back on track and tries to get her assault charges reduced to a misdemeanor; she gets a small job at a gas station to prove she is employed. Fiona reconciles with Eliza, the assistant manager at Patsy's. Lip grows frustrated in his relationship with Tami. Kevin and Veronica get in trouble at the twins' preschool, who have finally caught on to their scam with Gemma and Amy. The family learns that Liam, feeling neglected by his siblings, has been sleeping at a friends' house. Carl gets rejected by West Point and, upset, viciously attacks a robber at the seafood restaurant. Despite breaking up with Carl, Kelly continues to spend time with Debbie, who makes a move on Kelly by kissing her; Kelly rebuffs Debbie but wants to remain friends. At the gas station, Fiona reunites with Max, who offers to buy her out of her $100,000 investment.
110	14	"Found"	John Wells	John Wells	March 10, 2019	1.35
Having gotten the money from Max and getting her assault charges reduced to a misdemeanor, Fiona quits her job at the gas station and resolves to truly start her own life. Frank is recovering from his leg injury and will be on bed rest for months; the children hire a nurse to handle him. Carl decides to quit school, but Kelly convinces him to quit his job and return to school. Liam confronts Debbie with a list of demands to meet for him to return home. Lip and Tami come to blows on her decision for their baby and soon reach an understanding. Kevin tells Lip that he will be a great father. Fiona announces her plans to leave Chicago, and visits Ian in jail; he is supportive of her decision to leave. Frank thanks Fiona for taking care of the kids after Monica's departure. Lip plans a goodbye party for Fiona, but she departs before the party begins, leaving the family an envelope with $50,000; Debbie and Veronica find it in the kitchen. The episode concludes with Fiona boarding a plane for an unknown destination. Ian spots Fiona's plane and silently wishes her luck on her journey.

== Ratings ==
Viewership and ratings per episode of Shameless season 9
No.	Title	Air date	Rating (18–49)	Viewers (millions)	DVR (18–49)	DVR viewers (millions)	Total (18–49)	Total viewers (millions)
1	"Are You There Shim? It’s Me, Ian"	September 9, 2018	0.5	1.31	0.4	1.06	0.9	2.37
2	"Mo White!"	September 16, 2018	0.4	1.12	0.5	1.22	0.9	2.34
3	"Weirdo Gallagher Vortex"	September 23, 2018	0.4	1.05	—N/a	—N/a	—N/a	—N/a
4	"Do Right, Vote White!"	September 30, 2018	0.4	1.09	—N/a	—N/a	—N/a	—N/a
5	"Black-Haired Ginger"	October 7, 2018	0.3	1.00	0.5	1.03	0.8	2.03
6	"Face It, You're Gorgeous"	October 14, 2018	0.3	0.92	0.5	1.10	0.8	2.02
7	"Down Like the Titanic"	October 21, 2018	0.3	1.00	—N/a	—N/a	—N/a	—N/a
8	"The Apple Doesn't Fall Far from the Alibi"	January 20, 2019	0.3	0.80	0.4	0.95	0.7	1.75
9	"BOOOOOOOOOOOONE!"	January 27, 2019	0.3	0.84	0.4	1.05	0.7	1.89
10	"Los Diablos!"	February 10, 2019	0.4	1.14	—N/a	—N/a	—N/a	—N/a
11	"The Hobo Games"	February 17, 2019	0.3	0.97	0.5	1.06	0.8	2.04
12	"You'll Know the Bottom When You Hit It"	February 24, 2019	0.2	0.81	0.5	1.22	0.7	2.04
13	"Lost"	March 3, 2019	0.4	1.13	0.5	1.10	0.9	2.23
14	"Found"	March 10, 2019	0.5	1.35	0.4	1.12	0.9	2.46

== Critical reception ==
Review aggregator Rotten Tomatoes gives the ninth season 73%, based on 11 reviews. The critics consensus reads, "Shameless enters its ninth season on a tight budget of fresh stories left to tell, but still finds some rich new notes of characterization—all while gracefully bidding adieu to Emmy Rossum."
