= Mo White! =

- Shameless episode
- Episode no.: Season 9 Episode 2
- Directed by: Erin Feeley
- Written by: Molly Smith Metzler
- Cinematography by: Anthony Hardwick
- Editing by: Chetin Chabuk
- Original release date: September 16, 2018
- Running time: 55 minutes

Guest appearances
- Dan Lauria as Maurice "Mo" White (special guest star); Juliette Angelo as Geneva; Neal Bledsoe as Max Whitford; Scott Michael Campbell as Brad; Patrick Davis Alarcón as Jason; Paul Dooley as Ralph; Amirah Johnson as Alexandra "Xan" Galvez; Ashley Romans as Alex; Jim Hoffmaster as Kermit; Michael Patrick McGill as Tommy; Betsy Baker as Janice; Elizabeth Blackmore as Gayle; Gustavo Carr as Diego; Meera Rohit Kumbhani as Reshma; Jennifer Taylor as Anne Seery

Episode chronology
← Previous "Are You There Shim? It's Me, Ian"	Next → "Weirdo Gallagher Vortex"
- Shameless season 9

"Mo White!" is the second episode of the ninth season of the American television comedy drama Shameless, an adaptation of the British series of the same name. It is the 98th overall episode of the series and was written by producer Molly Smith Metzler, and directed by Erin Feeley. It originally aired on Showtime on September 16, 2018.

The series is set on the South Side of Chicago, Illinois, and depicts the poor, dysfunctional family of Frank Gallagher, a neglectful single father of six: Fiona, Phillip, Ian, Debbie, Carl, and Liam. He spends his days drunk, high, or in search of money, while his children need to learn to take care of themselves. In the episode, Frank tries to find a new way to make money, while Fiona considers a future investment. Meanwhile, Ian is released from prison, and Lip realizes that Xan may be more difficult for him than expected.

According to Nielsen Media Research, the episode was seen by an estimated 1.12 million household viewers and gained a 0.39 ratings share among adults aged 18–49. The episode received mixed reviews from critics, who criticized the thin characterization and development of the episode.

== Plot ==
Frank (William H. Macy) walks into the Alibi, lamenting that he is broke. A nearby customer suggests a possible job; with the congressional elections underway, a candidate offers money to people that pull out the rival's pickets. Due to Frank's STD scandal, Liam (Christian Isaiah) is kicked out of Hopkins Academy.

Fiona (Emmy Rossum) takes Liam with her, as she decides to invest in some commercial properties. She meets skeezy investor Max Whitford (Neal Bledsoe) and Liam helps her by using his knowledge from the academy. Max offers her a $100,000 investment in a retirement home, but Ford (Richard Flood) does not like the idea. When Xan (Amirah Johnson) is caught stealing a woman's wallet and abandoning Amy and Gemma, Lip (Jeremy Allen White) confronts her over her actions; Xan reveals she wanted the money for her mother. Carl (Ethan Cutkosky) is given an opportunity to get a promotion, although he is frustrated by the amount of tasks needed to prove his worth. However, he shows growth by saving dogs from being put to rest, preferring to give them a proper burial.

Kevin (Steve Howey) and Veronica (Shanola Hampton) consider sending Amy and Gemma to pre-school. They discover a prestigious pre-school, but it is expensive. They are redirected to an affordable Catholic preschool, but the school only has one slot left. To get the twins enrolled, Kevin and Veronica get Gemma and Amy to pretend to be one girl. Debbie (Emma Kenney) continues to protest for women rights, leading a protest outside a construction site. Nevertheless, no one is interested in joining her, and she is ridiculed by some of the employees. Later, she is visited by Alex (Ashley Romans), a woman disguised as a man in the construction site, who supports her movement.

Ian (Cameron Monaghan) is surprised when he is bailed out from prison. He believes Fiona did, but it is revealed that his followers have paid for the bail. His Gay Jesus Movement has spread nationwide gaining millions in funding from donors and getting various conversion camps shut down. However, Ian realizes his actions have inspired arsonist acts outside the city, and decides to abandon the church. Frank earns money by scamming both political parties, but ends up fired for more diversity hires. At the Alibi, he tells the patrons that they need a person who can support their ideologies. One of them suggests Mo White (Dan Lauria), a retired Republican representative. They collect money to support his campaign and visit him at his house to convince him to run. Despite Ford's opposition, Fiona makes the $100,000 investment, and celebrates with Liam in a vacant development land.

== Production ==
The episode was written by producer Molly Smith Metzler, and directed by Erin Feeley. It was Smith Metzler's second writing credit, and Feeley's first directing credit.

== Reception ==
=== Viewers ===
In its original American broadcast, "Mo White!" was seen by an estimated 1.12 million household viewers with a 0.39 in the 18–49 demographics. This means that 0.39 percent of all households with televisions watched the episode. This was a 15 percent decrease in viewership from the previous episode, which was seen by an estimated 1.31 million household viewers with a 0.47 in the 18–49 demographics.

=== Critical reviews ===
"Mo White!" received mixed reviews from critics. Myles McNutt of The A.V. Club gave the episode a "C+" grade and wrote, "The comic situations the show creates are often given thin justifications, and that's just supposed to be par for the course, but Frank's story demonstrates the consequences when the writers get sloppy constructing the setup to those situations. And when those comic situations don't really pay off in any significant way, or if the dramatic situations aren't explored as in depth as they could have been, you end up with another meandering episode that fails to tap into what the show can do best."

Derek Lawrence of Entertainment Weekly wrote "Nine years in, how could Shameless find a way to get even more dirty, conniving, and, well, shameless? Five words: Frank gets involved in politics."

David Crow of Den of Geek gave the episode a 4 star rating out of 5 and wrote "The second episode of season 9 is not quite as strong as the premiere, but it still comes out of the gate swinging and by maintaining last week's strongest element: Frank Gallagher's incorrigible awfulness as a human being." Kimberly Ricci of Uproxx wrote "The recent Shameless season premiere set up most characters for unlikely success and probable failure in their continuing Sisyphusian struggles. The shambolic antics continued in episode two, “Mo White,” but only one of the Gallaghers' happenings was truly compelling and worthy of examination."

Tamar Barbash of Telltale TV gave the episode a 2.5 star rating out of 5 and wrote "Two episodes into the season, it feels like we're heading up the steep incline of a roller coaster. Life is slowly progressing upwards... but the inevitable drop is just around the corner. Who's going to survive it?" Christopher Dodson of Show Snob wrote, "This season version of Shameless is shaping up to have monumental changes, rather than gradual character arcs. Things are moving quickly, with more on the line than ever. Lip's life, Carl's West Point dream, and Fiona's new career-driven life require quick, sharp thinking."

Jade Budowski of Decider wrote "Since Shameless premiered some nine years ago, the Gallaghers have all been trying to get off first base in their respective ways. Well, except maybe Frank, who has been content to get his hands on cash and booze from his comfy state of mediocrity. This week's installment is no exception, as the South Side clan do their best to get ahead and strive for that ever elusive home run." Paul Dailly of TV Fanatic gave the episode a 3.8 star rating out of 5, and wrote, ""Mo White for President" was a decent installment of this Showtime dramedy. While the show is starting to repeat itself, there is still a lot to like about it."
