= Found (Shameless) =

- Shameless episode
- Episode no.: Season 9 Episode 14
- Directed by: John Wells
- Written by: John Wells
- Cinematography by: Anthony Hardwick
- Editing by: Mark Strand
- Original release date: March 10, 2019
- Running time: 56 minutes

Guest appearances
- Scott Michael Campbell as Brad; Sarah Colonna as Lori; Patrick Davis Alarcón as Jason; Jess Gabor as Kelly Keefe; Shashawnee Hall as Captain Bob; Kate Miner as Tami Tamietti; Lori Alan as Stacy Baer; Michael Patrick McGill as Tommy

Episode chronology
← Previous "Lost"	Next → "We Few, We Lucky Few, We Band of Gallaghers!"
- Shameless season 9

"Found" is the fourteenth episode and season finale of the ninth season of the American television comedy drama Shameless, an adaptation of the British series of the same name. It is the 110th overall episode of the series and was written and directed by series developer John Wells. It originally aired on Showtime on March 10, 2019.

The series is set on the South Side of Chicago, Illinois, and depicts the poor, dysfunctional family of Frank Gallagher, a neglectful single father of six: Fiona, Phillip, Ian, Debbie, Carl, and Liam. He spends his days drunk, high, or in search of money, while his children need to learn to take care of themselves. In the episode, Fiona debates over her future, while the family tries to help Frank with his injury. The episode marked the final appearance of Emmy Rossum as Fiona Gallagher in the series.

According to Nielsen Media Research, the episode was seen by an estimated 1.35 million household viewers and gained a 0.45 ratings share among adults aged 18–49. The episode received generally positive reviews from critics, who were satisfied with the closure to Fiona's character. However, some questioned the future of the series without Fiona.

== Plot ==
Fiona (Emmy Rossum) stares at her $100,000 check, wondering what to do next. During this, the family brings Frank (William H. Macy) inside, realizing they will have to take turns to give him medication and cleaning his toilet. But they express confusion when they realize Liam (Christian Isaiah) is still not home.

To get back at Kelly (Jess Gabor), Carl (Ethan Cutkosky) and Debbie (Emma Kenney) sneak into her house and vandalize her car. To Debbie's surprise, Carl decides to drop out of school and focus solely on his job. When she learns about this, Kelly tackles him at work and makes him quit, not wanting him to ruin his life for her. Debbie feels tired of taking care of Frank, but is unable to find Liam when his shift comes. She locates him to the house of his friend Todd, but Liam makes it clear he will now live with Todd. Liam is frustrated by the family's negligence, to the point that Debbie herself forgot that she gave him permission to stay with Todd the previous night. Liam then hands her a list of demands needed for him to move back with them.

Lip (Jeremy Allen White) meets again with Tami (Kate Miner) to talk about the baby. Tami expresses her concerns that she might die by inheriting her mother's ovarian cancer, which could be prevented by her pregnancy. While Lip supports her, Tami grows aggressive. Later, she apologizes for her behavior, and they promise to come to a resolution that satisfies both of them. Fed up with Frank's behavior, Debbie decides to hire a nurse, Seamus (Dean Sharpe), to assist Frank at home. Fiona learns from her lawyer the charges have been dropped to a misdemeanor and Fiona only has to pay a simple fine. Seeing her situation, the lawyer suggests Fiona would be better off by leaving South Side.

Kevin (Steve Howey) gets his charisma back and is able to have normal sex again. Subsequently, he decides to make a business out of his religious persona, worrying Veronica (Shanola Hampton). Undecided, Fiona visits Ian (Cameron Monaghan) in prison to ask for advice. Ian supports her decision in leaving, feeling she does not owe anything to anyone. She returns home to pack her belongings, and Lip finally realizes she is leaving. He then teams up with the family to organize a goodbye party. Without anyone knowing, Fiona leaves before the party. She shares a farewell with Frank, who thanks her for "helping" the family. When Fiona remarks that she did everything, he says "If that make you sleep better" Initially upset, she silently leaves the house.

Despite Fiona leaving, the Gallaghers throw a party that night. During this, Lip shares his concerns with Kevin over his future role as a father. Kevin consoles him, certain that he will be a good father as long as he loves his child. Debbie finds a note, revealing that Fiona left $50,000 to the family before leaving. Fiona boards a plane, heading for an unknown destination, ready to begin her journey. Ian is seen playing basketball in prison, when he notices Fiona's plane flying overhead. He smiles, and returns to his game.

== Production ==
=== Development ===
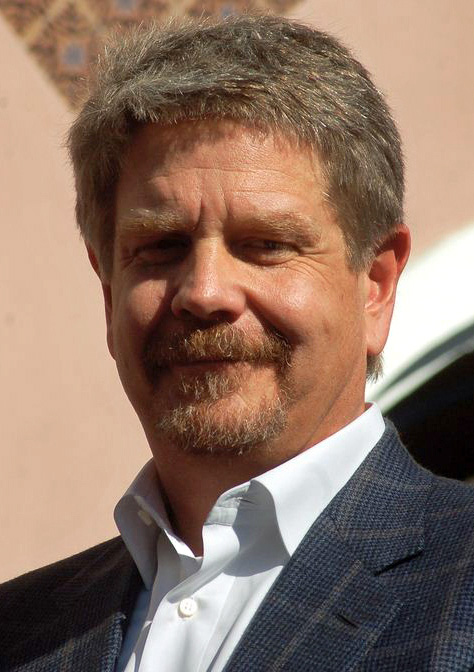
The episode was written and directed by John Wells.

The episode was written and directed by series developer John Wells. It was Wells' 20th writing credit, and eighth directing credit.

=== Casting ===
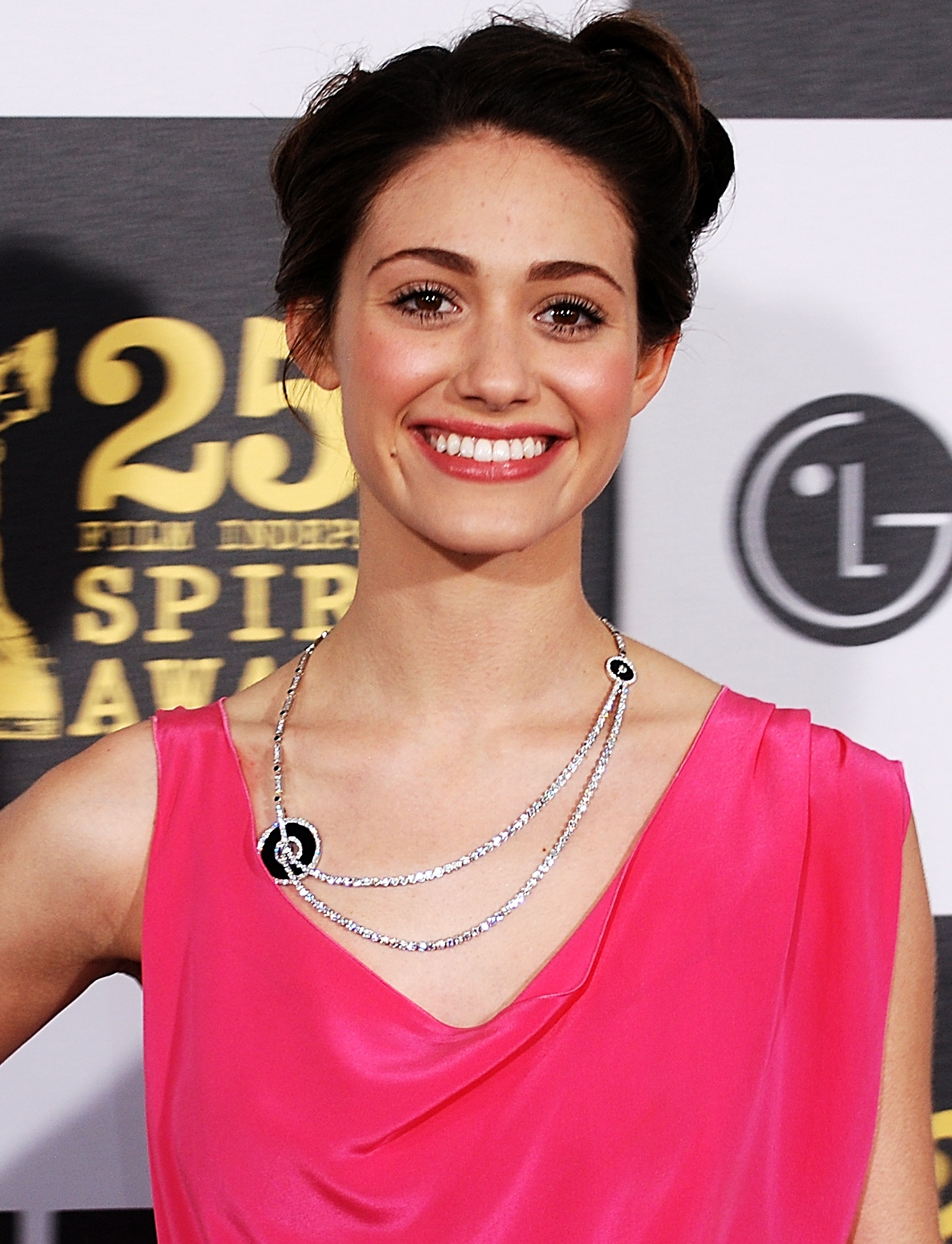
The episode marks the final appearance of Emmy Rossum in the series.

In August 2018, Emmy Rossum confirmed she would leave the series after the ninth season. In her statement, she said, "I know you will continue on without me, for now. There is much more Gallagher story to be told. I will always be rooting for my family. Try not to think of me as gone, just think of me as moving down the block." She later said, "it really does feel like we've spent nine wonderful years together, and it also feels like I'm excited to experience what else is out there, what other characters will excite me in the way that Fiona did for so long, and to see what else I can tackle, what is scary and exciting and wonderful."

Rossum informed the writers while filming the eighth and ninth episodes of the season that she would leave the series. Despite that, the writers had the idea that she might leave, so there were already plans put into motion. John Wells said, "I was happy to have it be so late because it meant that she had really made up her mind. I was really hopeful that she was going to stay, so I was very sad that she decided she wasn't going to come back, but at the same time, she let us know in plenty of time to make some changes. It was a little hectic, but that wasn't her fault, that was me continuing to try and convince her to stay." Wells also said that the writers never considered bringing back Jimmy for Fiona's final episode, feeling that it would feel like rehashing Ian's reunion with Mickey, "there was no way that we were going to double dip and do the same plot contrivance, no matter how much the fans wanted it to happen. It's just bad plotting and storytelling to do it."

The episode features the return of Cameron Monaghan as Ian, after originally leaving the series in the episode "Face It, You're Gorgeous". Wells said that the writers felt having Ian in Fiona's farewell was important, and Monaghan agreed to film his scene for one day. During this, Wells expressed interest in having him return, and Monaghan agreed to return for the tenth season.

== Reception ==
=== Viewers ===
In its original American broadcast, "Found" was seen by an estimated 1.35 million household viewers with a 0.45 in the 18–49 demographics. This means that 0.45 percent of all households with televisions watched the episode. This was a 19% increase in viewership from the previous episode, which was seen by an estimated 1.13 million household viewers with a 0.41 in the 18–49 demographics.

=== Critical reviews ===
"Found" received generally positive reviews from critics. Myles McNutt of The A.V. Club gave the episode a "C+" grade and wrote, "despite the fact that she was a sister and guardian, Wells treats her exit like an employee leaving the office, just a reality of life instead of a turning point that would change an entire family and the show about them. It's the latest in a series of decisions that make it difficult to imagine a scenario where Shameless escapes its own downward spiral and finds a path toward the kind of resonant storytelling it was once known for — and it's going to be a heck of a lot harder without its best character, who deserved a better send-off."

Derek Lawrence of Entertainment Weekly wrote "For nine seasons, we've watched (and occasionally cried) as the acting Gallagher matriarch raised her siblings, found both happiness and trouble, and navigated the demons that have plagued her family. And now she's gone, leaving the South Side behind for warmer pastures." Daniel Kurland of Den of Geek gave the episode a 4 star rating out of 5 and wrote "I know that this take on Shameless is entirely its own thing from its UK counterpart, and has been for quite some time, but on that show most of the “Gallagher” children left the nest until pretty much only Frank was left. Even though Frank is mostly a useless appendage to the show at this point, I'm not sure if it would continue to go on if Macy also decided to leave."

Kimberly Ricci of Uproxx wrote "His thoughts come from an honest place, but my god, these characters are damaged. No wonder Fiona packed a single suitcase and didn't look back." Christopher Dodson of Show Snob wrote "Here's to a wonderful, emotional, hilarious nine years. Buckle your seat belt and enjoy the flight, Fiona. You'll land with the rest of your life ahead of you."

Jade Budowski of Decider wrote "We've known for some time now that Rossum was on her way out, but this knowledge doesn't make last night's Season 9 finale, “Found”, any less difficult to swallow." Paul Dailly of TV Fanatic gave the episode a perfect 5 star rating out of 5, and wrote, ""Found" would have worked as a series finale. The characters all hit milestones, and we're left to ponder just how some of them will mess things up during the break."
