= Lost (Shameless) =

- Shameless episode
- Episode no.: Season 9 Episode 13
- Directed by: Iain B. MacDonald
- Written by: John Wells
- Cinematography by: Anthony Hardwick
- Editing by: Michael S. Stern
- Original release date: March 3, 2019
- Running time: 58 minutes

Guest appearances
- Robert Bailey Jr. as Dr. Wild; Neal Bledsoe as Max Whitford; Scott Michael Campbell as Brad; Sarah Colonna as Lori; Lucy DeVito as Yolanda; Rebecca Field as Eliza; Jess Gabor as Kelly Keefe; Wallace Langham as Dr. Tyson; Kate Miner as Tami Tamietti; Jim Hoffmaster as Kermit; Michael Patrick McGill as Tommy; Lori Alan as Stacy Baer; Eddie Alfano as K.J.; David Bowe as Bob Tamietti; Caroline Choi as Sister Frances; Ransford Doherty as Quincy

Episode chronology
← Previous "You'll Know the Bottom When You Hit It"	Next → "Found"
- Shameless season 9

"Lost" is the thirteenth episode of the ninth season of the American television comedy drama Shameless, an adaptation of the British series of the same name. It is the 109th overall episode of the series and was written by series developer John Wells, and directed by co-executive producer Iain B. MacDonald. It originally aired on Showtime on March 3, 2019.

The series is set on the South Side of Chicago, Illinois, and depicts the poor, dysfunctional family of Frank Gallagher, a neglectful single father of six: Fiona, Phillip, Ian, Debbie, Carl, and Liam. He spends his days drunk, high, or in search of money, while his children need to learn to take care of themselves. In the episode, Fiona turns her life around, while Frank ends up in the hospital. Meanwhile, Debbie kisses Kelly, while Lip wants to know Tami's plans about the baby.

According to Nielsen Media Research, the episode was seen by an estimated 1.13 million household viewers and gained a 0.41 ratings share among adults aged 18–49. The episode received mixed reviews from critics, although some expressed interest in Fiona's exit.

== Plot ==
At the apartment building, Frank (William H. Macy) is awakened when construction workers start demolishing it. He barely escapes out of the building, but he stumbles and breaks his leg. He refuses the workers' help and limps his way home. Noticing that his bone is seen, Fiona (Emmy Rossum) takes him to the hospital.

Carl (Ethan Cutkosky) is frustrated to see that Debbie (Emma Kenney) and Kelly (Jess Gabor) are still hanging out. Carl's situation worsens when he receives his letter from West Point, learning that he was not accepted. At his job, he is assigned to the cash register, and a man shows up with a gun to rob him. Carl dares the man to shoot him, and is alarmed when the man shoots twice at the restaurant. Carl overcomes him and brutally beats him. Lip (Jeremy Allen White) is visited by Bob (David Bowe), Tami's father, informing him that she has decided to keep the baby. Tami avoids his questions, as she questions if she could die young.

Kevin (Steve Howey) and Veronica (Shanola Hampton) begin having sex after Kevin's vasectomy passes. However, the experience is ruined as Kevin only lasts eight seconds. Later, they are confronted by Sister Frances (Caroline Choi), who has discovered that Amy and Gemma were posing as one girl. Fiona tries to find Liam (Christian Isaiah), who is not at home. Liam is revealed to be staying with a friend, and ignores the family's phone calls, feeling neglected by his siblings. Frank is taken to the hospital, but the doctors refuse to treat him as he has been at the hospital 52 times. Besides, as he has no insurance, he owes over $85,000 in costs. After getting him treated by a prodigy, the doctors take him back to his house and drop him off.

While sleeping on the couch with Kelly, Debbie kisses her. When Kelly awakes, she is horrified, stating she is not a lesbian. She says they can still be friends, but Debbie is ashamed of the events. Noticing her crying, Carl consoles her, and they both reconcile. Fiona meets with her lawyer to discuss her incoming charges, with the lawyer saying she can get it reduced to a misdemeanor. Fiona must now find a job, and she gets one at a gas station. During this, she apologizes to Eliza (Rebecca Field) for her behavior. She is then visited by Max (Neal Bledsoe), who reveals her $100,000 investment opened back up and offers to buy her out. As he leaves, Fiona considers the offer.

== Production ==
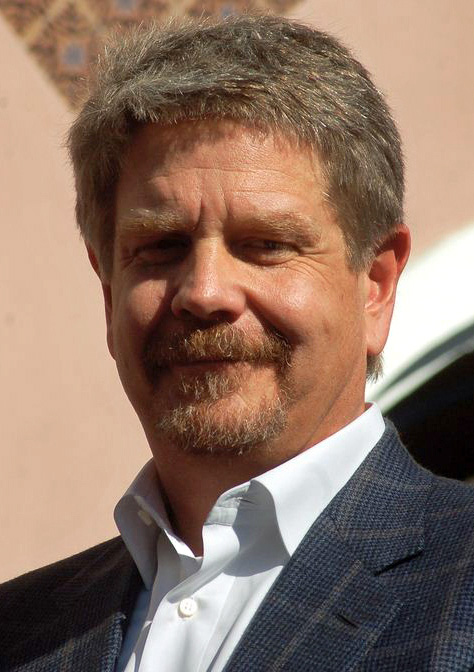
The episode was written by John Wells.

The episode was written by series developer John Wells, and directed by co-executive producer Iain B. MacDonald. It was Wells' 19th writing credit, and MacDonald's tenth directing credit.

== Reception ==
=== Viewers ===
In its original American broadcast, "Lost" was seen by an estimated 1.13 million household viewers with a 0.41 in the 18–49 demographics. This means that 0.41 percent of all households with televisions watched the episode. This was a 39 percent increase in viewership from the previous episode, which was seen by an estimated 0.81 million household viewers with a 0.24 in the 18–49 demographics.

=== Critical reviews ===
"Lost" received mixed reviews from critics. Myles McNutt of The A.V. Club gave the episode a "C+" grade and wrote, "I'm hopeful that despite the too-convenient life raft, next week's finale will give Rossum and Fiona a fitting conclusion. But as much as Fiona's exit is important, the bigger question at this point is what will be left in her absence, and the work the show intends to do in order to convince viewers that there's still a show in the remaining Gallaghers."

Derek Lawrence of Entertainment Weekly wrote "After spending all of my recent recaps worrying about the lack of a happy ending for poor Fiona, Max — formerly known around here as a scumbag — comes out of nowhere to save the day." David Crow of Den of Geek gave the episode a 3.5 star rating out of 5 and wrote "As convenient as this unexpected door opening is, it's been more than earned by the Gallagher matriarch. Next week we'll have to watch her walk through it, which will be bittersweet, but at least as she does so it is forcing all the Gallaghers to take stock in her and themselves... reminding us why we watch this show in the first place."

Kimberly Ricci of Uproxx wrote "That's not exactly the father-daughter bonding experience that anyone, let alone someone who's loathed Frank since he took away her childhood, wants. It's enough to send anyone to AA, which is what happened." Christopher Dodson of Show Snob wrote "In the end, Fiona may get some money after all. What she does with it is the biggest mystery Shameless ever had. Fiona is learning more about herself and her relationships through AA programs. Will she forget it all and relive the past, or learn from her mistakes and invest the money more wisely?"

Jade Budowski of Decider wrote "The penultimate episode of this season aired last night and we finally got a glimpse of how the eldest Gallagher sibling will make her exit from the series – and frankly, it's hard to imagine what the show will do without her, especially given that she is essentially its saving grace at this point. But we still have some time to figure that out." Paul Dailly of TV Fanatic gave the episode a perfect 5 star rating out of 5, and wrote, ""Lost" was a solid hour of this Showtime hit. The wheels are in motion for what is sure to be a rock-solid season finale."
