= Weirdo Gallagher Vortex =

- Shameless episode
- Episode no.: Season 9 Episode 3
- Directed by: Kat Coiro
- Written by: Joe Lawson
- Cinematography by: Anthony Hardwick
- Editing by: Russell Denove
- Original release date: September 23, 2018
- Running time: 55 minutes

Guest appearances
- Dan Lauria as Maurice "Mo" White (special guest star); Scott Michael Campbell as Brad; Patrick Davis Alarcón as Jason; Paul Dooley as Ralph; Amirah Johnson as Alexandra "Xan" Galvez; Sari Lennick as Rabbi; Ashley Romans as Alex; Don Stark as Wayne Ubberman; Jim Hoffmaster as Kermit; Michael Patrick McGill as Tommy; Bruce Robert Cole as Priest; Angel Laketa Moore as Denise; Steven M. Porter as Craig

Episode chronology
← Previous "Mo White!"	Next → "Do Right, Vote White!"
- Shameless season 9

"Weirdo Gallagher Vortex" is the third episode of the ninth season of the American television comedy drama Shameless, an adaptation of the British series of the same name. It is the 99th overall episode of the series and was written by co-executive producer Joe Lawson, and directed by Kat Coiro. It originally aired on Showtime on September 23, 2018.

The series is set on the South Side of Chicago, Illinois, and depicts the poor, dysfunctional family of Frank Gallagher, a neglectful single father of six: Fiona, Phillip, Ian, Debbie, Carl, and Liam. He spends his days drunk, high, or in search of money, while his children need to learn to take care of themselves. In the episode, Frank discovers Mo is involved in a scandal, while Fiona and Ford fight over her decision in the investment. Meanwhile, Ian seeks answers over his new purpose, while Debbie questions her sexuality.

According to Nielsen Media Research, the episode was seen by an estimated 1.05 million household viewers and gained a 0.39 ratings share among adults aged 18–49. The episode received mixed reviews from critics, who questioned the logic and writing of the episode, particularly over Lip's storyline.

== Plot ==
Ian (Cameron Monaghan) finds himself confused over his new purpose. He prays to "Shim", but is frustrated that he does not receive answers. He visits many churches across the city, but is not convinced by the priests' advices. When he asks Debbie (Emma Kenney) over it, she simply tells him he is not "Gay Jesus", telling him "why don’t you stop trying to save the world and save yourself?"

Carl (Ethan Cutkosky) wants to get a recommendation to West Point from a local congressman, Wayne Ubberman (Don Stark). When Veronica (Shanola Hampton) discovers it, she realizes Ubberman was a usual client when she was a dominatrix. She decides to help Carl by dominating Ubberman in his office. Afterwards, Carl receives his letter of recommendation. Fiona (Emmy Rossum) tells Ford (Richard Flood) about her investment, but he is not delighted with the news, as he feels Max may try to scam her. Liam (Christian Isaiah) starts public school, and makes a deal with another student for protection against Sissy, a bully.

Kevin (Steve Howey) discovers that a newspaper named the Alibi as the "rapiest bar" in Chicago. He decides to renovate part of the bar, and gets some customers to sign consensual agreements releasing them from all responsibility. Frank (William H. Macy) continues helping Mo White (Dan Lauria) with his campaign by visiting many houses to get support. While walking, Frank discovers that Mo is carrying an ankle monitor. Mo finally reveals that he is not allowed near schools, as he had to quit the Congress after he had a sexual relationship with a minor, but he claims the girl lied about her age. He served time in prison and is currently in parole. Frank debates whether to continue supporting him, but eventually convinces the Alibi that Mo has served his time and deserves a second chance.

Lip (Jeremy Allen White) is forced to go to the hospital when Xan (Amirah Johnson) breaks her arm. He wants to release her, but the hospital forbids him from doing it as he is not her family or legal guardian. Desperate, he pulls the plug on an elderly patient; while the doctors check on him, they escape the hospital. Debbie gets her revenge at the construction workers after Alex (Ashley Romans) helps her weld their cars. Afterwards, they share a kiss. Fiona returns to the apartment, finding a naked Ford in the bed. He wants to apologize for his behavior, and Fiona gleefully shuts the door behind her.

== Production ==
=== Development ===
The episode was written by co-executive producer Joe Lawson, and directed by Kat Coiro. It was Lawson's first writing credit, and Coiro's first directing credit.

== Reception ==
=== Viewers ===
In its original American broadcast, "Weirdo Gallagher Vortex" was seen by an estimated 1.05 million household viewers with a 0.39 in the 18–49 demographics. This means that 0.39 percent of all households with televisions watched the episode. This was a slight decrease in viewership from the previous episode, which was seen by an estimated 1.12 million household viewers with a 0.39 in the 18–49 demographics.

=== Critical reviews ===
"Weirdo Gallagher Vortex" received mixed reviews from critics. Myles McNutt of The A.V. Club gave the episode a "C" grade and wrote, "Ian spends the entirety of “Weirdo Gallagher Vortex” searching for answers, waiting for “Shim” to speak to him like they did when he was in prison. Funnily enough, I also spent the entirety of “Weirdo Gallagher Vortex” searching for answers, waiting for Shameless to shed light on why any of this is happening."

Derek Lawrence of Entertainment Weekly wrote "Just when you're beginning to wonder if the characters are starting to get on the straight and narrow (good for them, bad for us), they possibly kill a guy, endorse a pedophile, and resort to S&M to get a delinquent into West Point. Never change, Gallaghers, never change."

David Crow of Den of Geek gave the episode a 3.5 star rating out of 5 and wrote "It wasn't Shameless' finest hour, and for the sake of the season, I hope many of the plots start complementing each other better, as the series always works best when Gallaghers are all on the frontlines together, holding hands as they disappear into that titular vortex's goodnight. But it is still one episode I'm happy to drink with... just maybe not at the Alibi while Frank and Mo White are buying." Kimberly Ricci of Uproxx wrote "Debbie's questioning whether she's bisexual, but that's outweighed by Ian’s silly quest to talk to Shim and decide if he's really the Gay Che. No wonder the show's Reddit threads are full of people hoping Mickey will come back. The show hasn't seen a multi-faceted character since his departure, and the writers aren't granting that depth to Fiona."

Tamar Barbash of Telltale TV gave the episode a 4 star rating out of 5 and wrote "Sometimes a show gets lucky and current events sync up perfectly with the characters its created. Shameless Season 9 Episode 3, “Weirdo Gallagher Vortex,” benefits from this exact situation, and it makes for the best episode of the season thus far." Christopher Dodson of Show Snob wrote, "Kevin's sign is unlikely to work, and it is doubtful any of the patrons could properly seduce a woman into signing a consent form. However, Frank does have free shirts, donation's preferred. What more does Frank have planned to roll out the White is Right message?"

Jade Budowski of Decider wrote "As much as I enjoy spending time with these characters, this installment only really proves that there may not be many new stories to tell about the Gallaghers after all." Paul Dailly of TV Fanatic gave the episode a 2 star rating out of 5, and wrote, "[The episode] was another frustrating hour of this once-hot Showtime drama, and it only made me wonder why the show is pressing forward with the dull and predictable storylines."
