= The Apple Doesn't Fall Far from the Alibi =

- Shameless episode
- Episode no.: Season 9 Episode 8
- Directed by: Zetna Fuentes
- Written by: Joe Lawson
- Cinematography by: Anthony Hardwick
- Editing by: Russell Denove
- Original release date: January 20, 2019
- Running time: 53 minutes

Guest appearances
- Katey Sagal as Ingrid Jones (special guest star); Scott Michael Campbell as Brad; Rebecca Field as Eliza; Jess Gabor as Kelly Keefe; Kate Miner as Tami Tamietti; Joy Osmanski as Dr. Kwan; Jim Hoffmaster as Kermit; Michael Patrick McGill as Tommy; Max Adler as Eric; Dan Ahdoot as Realtor; Celia Finkelstein as Dawn; Anthony Gonzalez as Santiago; Heidi Johanningmeier as Len; Ana Mercedes as Mrs. Hernandez

Episode chronology
← Previous "Down Like the Titanic"	Next → "BOOOOOOOOOOOONE!"
- Shameless season 9

"The Apple Doesn't Fall Far from the Alibi" is the eighth episode of the ninth season of the American television comedy drama Shameless, an adaptation of the British series of the same name. It is the 104th overall episode of the series and was written by co-executive producer Joe Lawson, and directed by Zetna Fuentes. It originally aired on Showtime on January 20, 2019.

The series is set on the South Side of Chicago, Illinois, and depicts the poor, dysfunctional family of Frank Gallagher, a neglectful single father of six: Fiona, Phillip, Ian, Debbie, Carl, and Liam. He spends his days drunk, high, or in search of money, while his children need to learn to take care of themselves. In the episode, Fiona continues her downward spiral, while Frank and Ingrid seek a pregnancy.

According to Nielsen Media Research, the episode was seen by an estimated 0.80 million household viewers and gained a 0.26 ratings share among adults aged 18–49. The episode received mixed-to-negative reviews from critics, who criticized the writing, storylines and tone.

== Plot ==
Fiona (Emmy Rossum) continues heavily drinking at the house, to the point that she stops doing her chores and also forgets about her job at Patsy's. When she discovers that her apartment building will be demolished to make way for a new building, she vandalizes the site of the upcoming retirement home.

Kevin (Steve Howey) and Veronica (Shanola Hampton) file adoption papers, and they become the foster parents of a kid named Santiago (Anthony Gonzalez). While Santiago impresses everyone with his voice, he does not speak English. However, they learn that Santiago got separated from his family while seeking asylum at the border. Ingrid (Katey Sagal) surprises Frank (William H. Macy) by her interest in becoming pregnant, and he agrees to the idea. However, the doctor tells them that they will not be able to conceive, as Frank's sperm count is just one. Frank is unable to back off, as Ingrid has frozen her eggs.

With Fiona now absent in her family's finances, Debbie (Emma Kenney) is forced to pay the debts and restart the Squirrel Fund. Lip (Jeremy Allen White) and Tami (Kate Miner) check a few apartments, as Lip is uncomfortable with the idea of dating someone with many roommates. While Tami likes one of the apartments, Lip is unable to pay it due to his low income. Tami stays at the Gallagher household, and is shocked by the poor living conditions. While driving, Kelly (Jess Gabor) convinces Carl (Ethan Cutkosky) into stealing city's scooters to re-sell them to hipsters. Carl goes forward with the plan, despite still planning to attend West Point.

Desperate to not disappoint Ingrid, Frank manipulates Carl in giving him a sample of his semen. He uses this to impregnate Ingrid, making it appear like a miracle. At the Alibi, Fiona is approached by a man over trying drugs, until Kevin kicks him out. As the man leaves, Frank takes the vial. That night, Kevin and Veronica bring a passed out Fiona home, and the family is left astounded over what to do.

== Production ==
=== Development ===
The episode was written by co-executive producer Joe Lawson, and directed by Zetna Fuentes. It was Lawson's second writing credit, and Fuentes' third directing credit.

== Reception ==
=== Viewers ===
In its original American broadcast, "The Apple Doesn't Fall Far from the Alibi" was seen by an estimated 0.80 million household viewers with a 0.26 in the 18–49 demographics. This means that 0.26 percent of all households with televisions watched the episode. This was a 20 percent decrease in viewership from the previous episode, which was seen by an estimated 1.00 million household viewers with a 0.33 in the 18–49 demographics.

=== Critical reviews ===
"The Apple Doesn't Fall Far from the Alibi" received mixed-to-negative reviews from critics. Myles McNutt of The A.V. Club gave the episode a "C–" grade and wrote, "It's one thing for a show to hold cards close to its chest if it has our full attention in general, but this is season nine of this television show, and between character exits and rebooted storylines the word I'd use to describe its current storytelling status is stagnant. If you're in that position, you can't just casually jump into a new half-season with warmed-over storylines."

Derek Lawrence of Entertainment Weekly wrote "Despite originally being filmed as a typical eighth episode of the season, “The Apple Doesn’t Fall Far From the Alibi” has the feel of a season premiere, catching up with the Gallagher men as they settle into new relationships. Fiona is continuing to spiral downwards, and the always scheming Frank is ready to be a father again. Or make that a grandfather." David Crow of Den of Geek gave the episode a 3 star rating out of 5 and wrote "The Gallaghers are back in Shameless, and Fiona is in a bad place. But is the series itself also in a downward sloping rut?"

Kimberly Ricci of Uproxx wrote "Next week's episode will see progress on that note, but for now, the writers are sizing up the various pairings, whether they're romantic couplings or affairs of another nature." Christopher Dodson of Show Snob wrote "The Gallagher spirit is back in Shameless with Fiona's downfall, Frank's schemes and Carl being led by love once again. Where is that body anyways?"

Jade Budowski of Decider wrote "There are only so many ways to tell the same story over, and over, and over again. If Shameless does make the smart move and end with this season, the Gallaghers will be missed, but at least they won't be stuck in this exhausting ninth season rut anymore." Paul Dailly of TV Fanatic gave the episode a 2 star rating out of 5, and wrote, ""The Apple Doesn't Fall Far From the Alibi" was a mediocre attempt at a midseason premiere. The show is starting to become laugh-challenged at this stage, and it's probably time to think about wrapping it up."
