= Are You There Shim? It's Me, Ian =

- Shameless episode
- Episode no.: Season 9 Episode 1
- Directed by: Iain B. MacDonald
- Written by: Nancy M. Pimental
- Cinematography by: Anthony Hardwick
- Editing by: Russell Denove
- Original release date: September 9, 2018
- Running time: 55 minutes

Guest appearances
- Scott Michael Campbell as Brad; Sammi Hanratty as Kassidi; Amirah Johnson as Alexandra "Xan" Galvez; Lex Medlin as Jonathan Rosenbaum; Kate Miner as Tami Tamietti; Glenn Plummer as Jacob; Jim Hoffmaster as Kermit; Michael Patrick McGill as Tommy; Peter Banifaz as Farhad; Andrew Bowen as Darren; Monika Casey as Sasha; Cristen Coppen as Greta Johnson; Jackson Davis as Ed Bragg; Ben D. Goldberg as Edgar; Rif Hutton as Gene Powell; Fernando Martinez as Joselito; Maximilian Osinski as Len Martini; Alison Rood as Irene Bragg; Jennifer Taylor as Anne Seery; Ashley Wood as Beverly Martini

Episode chronology
← Previous "Sleepwalking"	Next → "Mo White!"
- Shameless season 9

"Are You There Shim? It's Me, Ian" is the first episode of the ninth season of the American television comedy drama Shameless, an adaptation of the British series of the same name. It is the 97th overall episode of the series and was written by executive producer Nancy M. Pimental, and directed by co-executive producer Iain B. MacDonald. It originally aired on Showtime on September 9, 2018.

The series is set on the South Side of Chicago, Illinois, and depicts the poor, dysfunctional family of Frank Gallagher, a neglectful single father of six: Fiona, Phillip, Ian, Debbie, Carl, and Liam. He spends his days drunk, high, or in search of money, while his children need to learn to take care of themselves. In the episode, Fiona tries to pay Ian's bail, but Ian is content with his life in prison. Meanwhile, Frank is involved in a STD pandemic at the PTA, while Carl seeks a promotion at the military school.

According to Nielsen Media Research, the episode was seen by an estimated 1.31 million household viewers and gained a 0.47 ratings share among adults aged 18–49. The episode received mixed reviews from critics, who praised its humor, although some were worried about the many subplots.

== Plot ==
Ian (Cameron Monaghan) is in prison, where he becomes a leader for the gay inmates. Fiona (Emmy Rossum) tries desperately in bailing him out, but Ian is actually happy with his new role. Frank (William H. Macy) has been sleeping with many mothers at the PTA in Hopkins Academy, and also seizes the opportunity to steal some of their silverware.

Lip (Jeremy Allen White) has Xan (Amirah Johnson) moving in with the Gallaghers. He attends Brad and Cami's wedding, and flirts with Cami's sister, Tami (Kate Miner). They have sex, although Lip is unstatisfied by the experience after Tami vomits on his shoe. Debbie (Emma Kenney) works as a welder at a construction, but is dismayed to learn that she is being paid less than her male co-workers despite working the exact same amount of hours. Her boss, Jacob (Glenn Plummer), states it is because Debbie constantly uses the bathroom, so she is forced to wear an adult diaper to work. Carl (Ethan Cutkosky) is still in military school with two days left in his service, and is hoping to get a recommendation to go to West Point. His superior agrees to a promotion if he can get rid of Kassidi (Sammi Hanratty), who has been camping outside the school awaiting for his return.

The PTA is called by the Academy, where a doctor places them in quarantine. He reveals that there has been an increase in STD in the PTA and asks everyone to test themselves. Those infected are forced to stay to get administered antibiotics, requiring them to stay the night. As the doctor asks them over possible affairs, everyone is revealed to have cheated on their partner, with most women pointing that they slept with Frank. Frank defends his actions by claiming they will be immune to new diseases, and also acts as a marriage counselor when tensions arise. They are released by morning, with a parent kicking Frank in the crotch for sleeping with his wife.

To pay Ian's bail, Fiona gets the apartment building appraised. Ford (Richard Flood) disapproves of Fiona's decision, as he believes Ian is too impulsive. Fiona grows concerned when she finds out Ford has a second phone; Ford claims it is an international phone used to call his mom. Veronica (Shanola Hampton) and Kevin (Steve Howey) struggle in getting their children to sleep, until Kevin exhausts them by playing with them at night. Brad (Scott Michael Campbell) suggests Lip should ask Tami out at her saloon, but she brutally rejects him. Due to the smell of the diaper, Jacob finally agrees to get an equal payment to Debbie. Carl finds out that a fellow cadet, wanting to help Carl, had killed Kassidi and buried her body, shocking him.

== Production ==
The episode was written by executive producer Nancy M. Pimental, and directed by co-executive producer Iain B. MacDonald. It was Pimental's 20th writing credit, and MacDonald's eighth directing credit.

== Reception ==
=== Viewers ===
In its original American broadcast, "Are You There Shim? It's Me, Ian" was seen by an estimated 1.31 million household viewers with a 0.47 in the 18–49 demographics. This means that 0.47 percent of all households with televisions watched the episode. This was a 25 percent decrease in viewership from the previous episode, which was seen by an estimated 1.73 million household viewers with a 0.60 in the 18–49 demographics.

=== Critical reviews ===
"Are You There Shim? It's Me, Ian" received generally positive reviews from critics. Myles McNutt of The A.V. Club gave the episode a "B–" grade and wrote, "That's a lot of pressure for a season of television, and based on the premiere I'm not sure the current trajectory of Shameless is going to be able to withstand it. I'd love to be proven wrong."

Derek Lawrence of Entertainment Weekly wrote "Gay affairs are revealed, marriages are saved, and Frank gets kicked in his healing region. “Who knew that STDs could bring so much happiness?” Amen, Frank."

Tamar Barbash of Telltale TV gave the episode a 2.5 star rating out of 5 and wrote "All in all, there is plenty to look forward to as Shameless Season 9 unfolds, as long as they don't get too tied up in Frank's nonsense at the expense of the rich storytelling opportunities that exist for the rest of the family." Christopher Dodson of Show Snob wrote, "After news the Emmy Rossum would be leaving after this season, the tension and expectations for this season were intensified. The season 9 premiere of Shameless did not disappoint, as each character had to decide their only level of worth and value in their station in life."

Jade Budowski of Decider wrote "As is wont to happen on Shameless, everyone's just trying to get under or over on someone in the Season 9 premiere, all with varying results. At this rate, it doesn't really seem to be working out for any of them. But we've still got a whole season of total debauchery to look forward to." Paul Dailly of TV Fanatic gave the episode a 3.5 star rating out of 5, and wrote, "For a season premiere, it was successful at kicking off some new plots, but aside from that, it was a run of the mill episode."
