= Black-Haired Ginger =

- Shameless episode
- Episode no.: Season 9 Episode 5
- Directed by: William H. Macy
- Written by: Philip Buiser
- Cinematography by: Anthony Hardwick
- Editing by: Russell Denove
- Original release date: October 7, 2018
- Running time: 56 minutes

Guest appearances
- Katey Sagal as Ingrid Jones (special guest star); Juliette Angelo as Geneva; Scott Michael Campbell as Brad; Dennis Cockrum as Terry Milkovich; Jess Gabor as Kelly Keefe; Shannon Lucio as Alison De Marco; Perry Mattfeld as Mel; Ashley Romans as Alex; Jessica Szohr as Nessa Chabon; Jim Hoffmaster as Kermit; Michael Patrick McGill as Tommy; Anna Khaja as Padma Singh; Salli Saffioti as Libby

Episode chronology
← Previous "Do Right, Vote White!"	Next → "Face It, You're Gorgeous"
- Shameless season 9

"Black-Haired Ginger" is the fifth episode of the ninth season of the American television comedy drama Shameless, an adaptation of the British series of the same name. It is the 101st overall episode of the series and was written by producer Philip Buiser, and directed by main cast member William H. Macy. It originally aired on Showtime on October 7, 2018.

The series is set on the South Side of Chicago, Illinois, and depicts the poor, dysfunctional family of Frank Gallagher, a neglectful single father of six: Fiona, Phillip, Ian, Debbie, Carl, and Liam. He spends his days drunk, high, or in search of money, while his children need to learn to take care of themselves. In the episode, Ian prepares for his incoming trial, while Frank tests a new drug. Meanwhile, Carl and Liam are both confronted by two girls, while Lip is on the verge of relapsing.

According to Nielsen Media Research, the episode was seen by an estimated 1.00 million household viewers and gained a 0.34 ratings share among adults aged 18–49. The episode received mixed reviews from critics, who criticized the writing, although some praised the scenes between Fiona and Ian.

== Plot ==
Ian (Cameron Monaghan) is told by his lawyer that he should plead insanity for his bipolar disorder, which could get him just two years of prison and probation. While Fiona (Emmy Rossum) does not want to interfere, she nevertheless insists on taking the plea deal, frustrating Ian.

Kevin (Steve Howey) is invited by Alison De Marco (Shannon Lucio) to speak at a women's convention after the positive feedback from the Alibi Room. He is accompanied by Veronica (Shanola Hampton), and he is shocked by many of the stories the women share, several of which include rape. Frank (William H. Macy) passes out in the Alibi's restroom, so Kevin and Veronica are forced to take him to the hospital. The doctor explains that Frank's medicine for his liver has worn out and he needs a new medication. As Frank has no insurance, the medication costs $2,000 per month, so Frank asks for a cheaper option. The doctor provides it, but Frank starts experiencing severe side effects, including face paralysis and erectile dysfunction.

Carl (Ethan Cutkosky) attends a West Point luncheon where he meets a girl named Kelly (Jess Gabor), who becomes interested. She offers to give him oral sex, but she passes out due to her alcoholism. When she wakes up, she believes Carl abused her, despite him recording the event to prove otherwise. She chases him, forcing him to flee. Sissy makes a move on Liam (Christian Isaiah), then tries to convince him he got her pregnant. The Gallaghers overhear this, drug her and drop her at a clinic. Due to a power outage, Lip (Jeremy Allen White) gets the day off at the shop. He struggles with not relapsing, so he tries to find ways to keep himself busy.

Debbie (Emma Kenney) fails in reconciling with Alex (Ashley Romans), and wonders if she is truly lesbian. She asks Nessa (Jessica Szohr) and Mel (Perry Mattfeld) for advice, and Mel decides to prove her sexuality by kissing her. Kelly visits Carl at his house, apologizing for not believing him. Frank gets Liam to electrocute his penis in an attempt to overcome the dysfunction, but he ends up in the hospital. There, he runs into a woman tied to a bed, Ingrid Jones (Katey Sagal), a mentally unstable woman. She manipulates him into releasing her and attacks him before escaping; Frank discovers that this finally solved his dysfunction. Fiona and Ford (Richard Flood) have a fight, although they reconcile later on. Before his hearing, Ian dyes his hair black and prepares in running away. Nevertheless, he returns home, with Fiona and Lip accompanying him to the court hearing, and Fiona states she will support whatever decision he takes. At the hearing, Ian takes Fiona's advice and pleads insanity. As his Gay Jesus supporters get upset, he exchanges a look with Fiona, with both smiling.

== Production ==
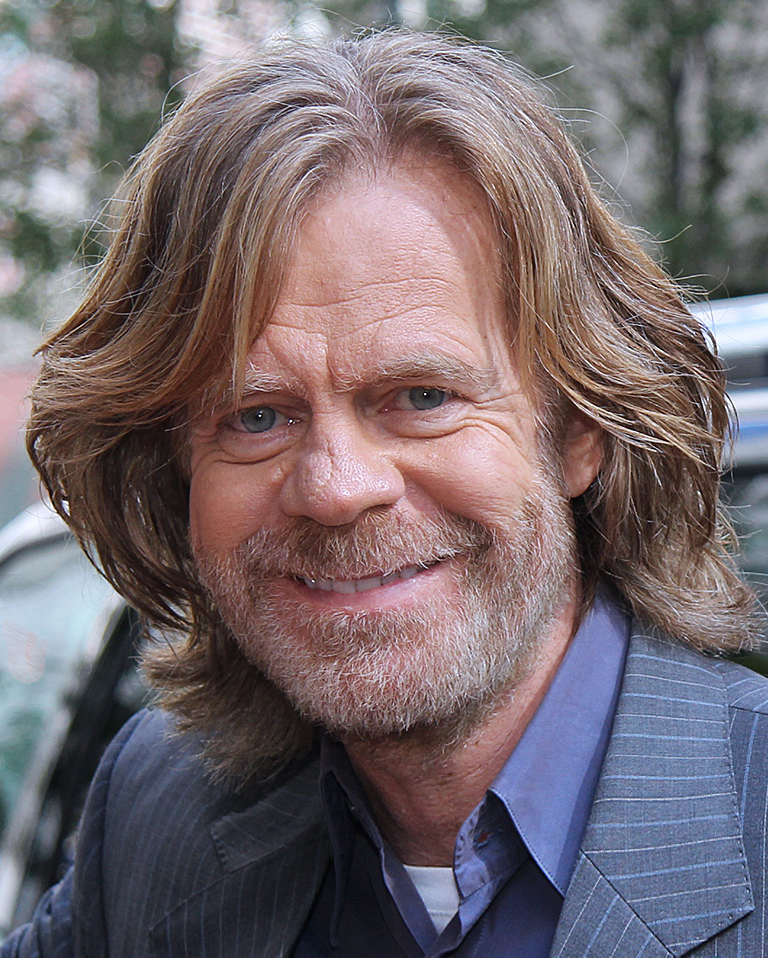
The episode was directed by William H. Macy.

The episode was written by producer Philip Buiser, and directed by main cast member William H. Macy. It was Buiser's first writing credit, and Macy's second directing credit.

== Reception ==
=== Viewers ===
In its original American broadcast, "Black-Haired Ginger" was seen by an estimated 1.00 million household viewers with a 0.34 in the 18–49 demographics. This means that 0.34 percent of all households with televisions watched the episode. This was a 9 percent decrease in viewership from the previous episode, which was seen by an estimated 1.09 million household viewers with a 0.37 in the 18–49 demographics.

=== Critical reviews ===
"Black-Haired Ginger" received mixed reviews from critics. Myles McNutt of The A.V. Club gave the episode a "C+" grade and wrote, "You could absolutely reframe Shameless as a show about the Alibi, its patrons, and the neighborhood around them to generate ten more seasons of stories. However, the idea that this would be anything more than a shell of the show Shameless once was is fundamentally naïve, and does not bode well for the show's future even if they get out of the rut they're currently stuck in."

Derek Lawrence of Entertainment Weekly wrote "The election may be over, but Shameless is still hitting some big issues — and only like Shameless can. In Sunday's "Black-Haired Ginger," the series tackled the #MeToo movement, the criminal justice system, and the healthcare system. (And that doesn't even include the episode ending at Planned Parenthood)." Kimberly Ricci of Uproxx wrote "Shameless didn't celebrate its 100th episode much at all and definitely not with a return of any of these beloved characters, but the series took steps toward redemption during the latest episode, “Black-Haired Ginger.”"

Tamar Barbash of Telltale TV gave the episode a 3 star rating out of 5 and wrote "William H. Macy may be the star of Shameless, but Frank Gallagher has been bringing the show down for quite some time. I'd hoped we were done with watching him defy the odds of medicine time and time again, but apparently not." Christopher Dodson of Show Snob wrote, "This season, Shameless has been about showing the dynamics of growth and progress, both through the Gallaghers and the Southside at large. This week, those adult decisions and their consequences are confronted."

Jade Budowski of Decider wrote "For as long as Shameless has been on the air, the Gallaghers' loyalty to each other has been at the heart of the series. These last few episodes had seemingly lost sight of that, but last night's installment, “Black-Haired Ginger”, gifted us with some of the familiar family ties that made us fall in love with the show in the first place." Paul Dailly of TV Fanatic gave the episode a 4.6 star rating out of 5, and wrote, ""Black-Haired Ginger" was another solid installment of this Showtime drama. Shameless Season 9 got off to a rocky start, but it's all shaping up rather nicely."
