= Do Right, Vote White! =

- Shameless episode
- Episode no.: Season 9 Episode 4
- Directed by: Mark Mylod
- Written by: John Wells
- Cinematography by: Anthony Hardwick
- Editing by: Michael S. Stern
- Original release date: September 30, 2018
- Running time: 56 minutes

Guest appearances
- Dan Lauria as Maurice "Mo" White (special guest star); Juliette Angelo as Geneva; Scott Michael Campbell as Brad; Dennis Cockrum as Terry Milkovich; Amirah Johnson as Alexandra "Xan" Galvez; Michael Provost as Ben; Ashley Romans as Alex; Jim Hoffmaster as Kermit; Michael Patrick McGill as Tommy; Stephanie Charles as Tyesha; Steven M. Porter as Craig; Matt McTighe as Clint; Nicole Wolf as Mercy

Episode chronology
← Previous "Weirdo Gallagher Vortex"	Next → "Black-Haired Ginger"
- Shameless season 9

"Do Right, Vote White!" is the fourth episode of the ninth season of the American television comedy drama Shameless, an adaptation of the British series of the same name. It is the 100th overall episode of the series and was written by series developer John Wells, and directed by Mark Mylod. It originally aired on Showtime on September 30, 2018.

The series is set on the South Side of Chicago, Illinois, and depicts the poor, dysfunctional family of Frank Gallagher, a neglectful single father of six: Fiona, Phillip, Ian, Debbie, Carl, and Liam. He spends his days drunk, high, or in search of money, while his children need to learn to take care of themselves. In the episode, Frank makes one last push to get Mo White to win the election, while Lip decides to take a big step in helping Xan.

According to Nielsen Media Research, the episode was seen by an estimated 1.09 million household viewers and gained a 0.37 ratings share among adults aged 18–49. The episode received mixed reviews from critics, who criticized its themes and expressed mixed reactions towards the different storylines.

== Plot ==
The election is arriving in a few days, and while Frank (William H. Macy) intends to do one last push for Mo (Dan Lauria), the Chicago Tribune only gives Mo a 6% chance of winning, with the candidates Isaac Ruiz and Eleanor Wyman currently in a tight race. On top of that, some refuse to even talk with Mo due to his sex offender status.

Carl (Ethan Cutkosky) is confronted by Ben (Michael Provost), a young man who planned to enlist in West Point on Ubberman's recommendation, but was forced to wait one more year after he gave the recommendation to Carl. He wants them to solve the problem by a duel, and Carl reluctantly accepts. Feeling he lacks his ruthless side due to his community service, Carl visits a racist war veteran to get him back on track. At the duel, Ben reveals he does not want to join the school and is only pressured by his father. To save him the embarrassment, Carl shoots him in the thigh. Debbie (Emma Kenney) and Alex (Ashley Romans) briefly move in together, but Alex believes Debbie to be straight, so Debbie decides to move back into the house.

Kevin (Steve Howey) changes the policy at the Alibi and asks a journalist to visit the place. Later, the paper removes the bar's title as "rapiest bar" and changes it to "most female friendly" bar in South Side, causing women to start frequenting the place. Other bar owners, who are in the lists of "rapiest bars", ask Kevin to help them get out of the list. Ian (Cameron Monaghan) is dismayed upon learning that his Gay Jesus followers have expanded internationally, and are pressuring him to plead not guilty at the trial to build awareness. However, Ian faces up to ten years in prison if he does not take the plea deal. After Liam (Christian Isaiah) quickly finishes a test, the teachers decide to move him up a few grades.

Frank helps Mo by hiring Terry (Dennis Cockrum) and his friends in intimidating potential voters from staying away from the ballots. This soon escalates into a riot with Antifa members, which is also attended by Fiona (Emmy Rossum). Fiona initially plans to vote for Ruiz, because he is against rent control; Ford (Richard Flood) convinces her to vote for another candidate. That night, Frank and Mo are shocked to discover that Mo won the election by 52% due to the low turnouts, devastating the other candidates' supporters. Lip (Jeremy Allen White) is surprised when Xan's mother, Mercy (Nicole Wolf), returns, and he decides to confront her for her abandonment. He offers her $10,000 if she signs away her parental rights and grant him custody. As she considers it, Xan (Amirah Johnson) sees Mercy and embraces her. Lip realizes Xan prefers to live with her mother, so she gives Mercy the money and leaves them.

== Production ==
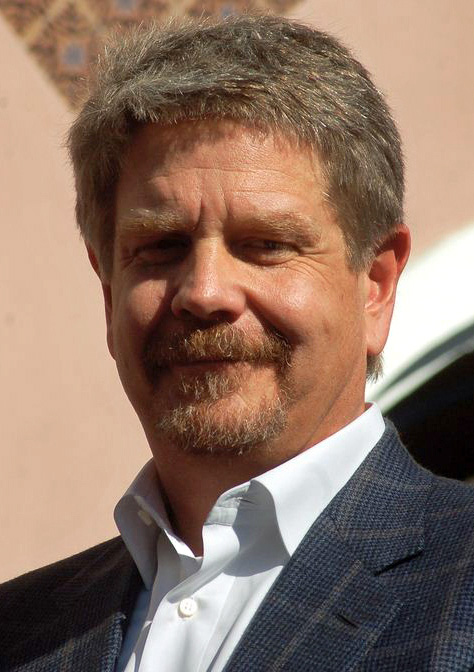
The episode was written by John Wells.

The episode was written by series developer John Wells, and directed by Mark Mylod. It was Wells' 18th writing credit, and Mylod's 12th directing credit.

== Reception ==
=== Viewers ===
In its original American broadcast, "Do Right, Vote White!" was seen by an estimated 1.09 million household viewers with a 0.37 in the 18–49 demographics. This means that 0.37 percent of all households with televisions watched the episode. This was a slight increase in viewership from the previous episode, which was seen by an estimated 1.05 million household viewers with a 0.39 in the 18–49 demographics.

=== Critical reviews ===
"Do Right, Vote White!" received mixed reviews from critics. Myles McNutt of The A.V. Club gave the episode a "C" grade and wrote, "This episode succeeds at being culturally relevant to our present conflicts, but it has little to no grasp on the conflicts that used to drive the show forward, and it's thus another frustrating installment of the show's ninth season."

Derek Lawrence of Entertainment Weekly wrote "Shameless turned 100 with their latest episode, and they celebrated like only they could, by trying to buy children, engaging in a duel, and having an election somehow wilder than any other before it." Megan Vick of TV Guide wrote "This season of Shameless may have opened with doubts about the future, but the simultaneously blistering funny and heartwarming 100th episode proved this show knows what it is and what it does well. Even without Fiona, the show can soldier on if it continues to play to its strengths."

David Crow of Den of Geek gave the episode a 4 star rating out of 5 and wrote "Overall, it was a glib and cynical night of Shameless. Or just another Sunday. It also was a return to form in that dark humor, because it did more than just hold up a mirror to viewers; it dug past just surface level reflections of Fi, Lip, and Ian. And that’s more of what we want to see." Kimberly Ricci of Uproxx wrote "instead of taking a handful of years to reach 100, successful series often have to reach season 9 to achieve the distinction. That's a long trek and one worthy of gifting something special to faithful viewers, but the Gallagher family rang in the occasion with a run-of-the-mill episode."

Tamar Barbash of Telltale TV gave the episode a perfect 5 star rating out of 5 and wrote "In all seriousness, Shameless delivers a perfect hour for their 100th episode. A biting commentary on the prevalence of both sexual assault and racism in our culture, this episode provides the perfect blend of hard-hitting truth and edgy-to-the-point-of-discomfort comedy." Christopher Dodson of Show Snob wrote, "The 100th episode of Shameless helped to frame the rest of this lackluster season."

Jade Budowski of Decider wrote "I know I'm beating the same drum every week by complaining about how the story isn't going anywhere and we're sticking around for the characters we love, but that appears to be the situation we're stuck in for the foreseeable future." Paul Dailly of TV Fanatic gave the episode a 4 star rating out of 5, and wrote, "At times, "Do Right, Vote White" felt like a PSA about the pitfalls of not voting at all or not voting for the right person, but it represented the change in direction this Showtime hit needs."
