= We Few, We Lucky Few, We Band of Gallaghers! =

- Shameless episode
- Episode no.: Season 10; Episode 1
- Directed by: John Wells
- Written by: John Wells
- Cinematography by: Anthony Hardwick
- Editing by: Russell Denove
- Original release date: November 10, 2019
- Running time: 55 minutes

Guest appearances
- Luis Guzmán as Mikey O'Shea (special guest star); Scott Michael Campbell as Brad; Camille Chen as Lewis; Jess Gabor as Kelly Keefe; Deidrie Henry as Fowler; Wallace Langham as Dr. Tyson; Carol Locatell as Eleanor; Jim Hoffmaster as Kermit; Michael Patrick McGill as Tommy; Peter Banifaz as Farhad; Linara Washington as Benyon

Episode chronology
← Previous "Found"	Next → "Sleep Well My Prince for Tomorrow You Shall Be King"
- Shameless season 10

"We Few, We Lucky Few, We Band of Gallaghers!" is the first episode of the tenth season of the American television comedy drama Shameless, an adaptation of the British series of the same name. It is the 111th overall episode of the series and was written and directed by series developer John Wells. It originally aired on Showtime on November 10, 2019.

The series is set on the South Side of Chicago, Illinois, and depicts the poor, dysfunctional family of Frank Gallagher, a neglectful single father of six: Fiona, Phillip, Ian, Debbie, Carl, and Liam. He spends his days drunk, high, or in search of money, while his children need to learn to take care of themselves. In the episode, the family adjusts to their new life without Fiona.

According to Nielsen Media Research, the episode was seen by an estimated 0.76 million household viewers and gained a 0.21 ratings share among adults aged 18–49. The episode received generally mixed reviews, with critics casting doubt over the series' prospects without Fiona.

== Plot ==
Six months have passed since Fiona left the house. Debbie has become the head of the house, a pregnant Tami has moved in, Liam has returned to live under certain conditions, and Frank continues living while recovering from his injury. Debbie establishes limits on the money spent, but is later revealed that she has bought expensive clothing, which she returns before the return deadline passes.

Carl graduates from the military academy, after having been sent to the brig for attacking other soldiers for bullying a fellow cadet. While he graduates, his superior tells him he will never be welcomed in the Army. Kelly cheers him up by having sex with him multiple times, as she is leaving for a Navy position the following day. Frank goes to his doctor for a prescription of oxycodone, but the doctor is certain his condition improved and only gives him advil. He tries to rob an old woman and flees, running into Mikey, who is pretending to be legless to get money. They bond, and Mikey helps Frank in stealing couches from an expensive hotel.

Kevin struggles in keeping up with basketball games, and Veronica remarks that it might be due to his age. He wants to buy expensive sneakers, believing that it might be the reason, but Veronica forbids him from taking money from the family's fund. To get the money, Kevin works again as a dancer at a gay club. While he gets money, he does not move as smoothly as he once did. Tami is shocked when she suddenly goes into labor, and Lip takes her to the hospital. The doctors are forced to perform an emergency Caesarean section on Tami. The baby is successfully delivered, but Tami faints, and is taken to an emergency room when her pulse drops.

Liam embraces his African-American heritage, but is often bullied by people in the street. Kevin earns enough money to buy the sneakers, but discovers that he still plays badly, finally realizing that he might be old. The family reunites at the hospital, with Lip holding his child, a boy.

== Production ==
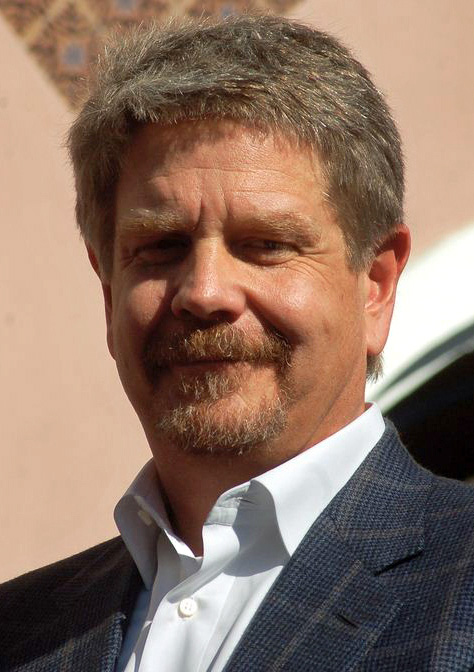
The episode was written and directed by John Wells.

The episode was written and directed by series developer John Wells. It was Wells' 21st writing credit, and ninth directing credit.

== Reception ==
=== Viewers ===
In its original American broadcast, "We Few, We Lucky Few, We Band of Gallaghers!" was seen by an estimated 0.76 million household viewers with a 0.21 in the 18–49 demographics. This means that 0.21 percent of all households with televisions watched the episode. This was a 44 percent decrease in viewership from the previous episode, which was seen by an estimated 1.35 million household viewers with a 0.45 in the 18–49 demographics.

=== Critical reviews ===
"We Few, We Lucky Few, We Band of Gallaghers!" received mixed reviews from critics. Myles McNutt of The A.V. Club gave the episode a "C–" grade and wrote, "“We Few, We Lucky Few, We Band of Gallaghers” is more perplexing than offensive, inert in ways that fuel the concerns about how the show intends to survive in Emmy Rossum's absence. While the show's erratic storytelling created complications for Fiona's storylines like it did everyone else's, Fiona had a clear narrative arc, something that the show has struggled to generate for other characters."

Daniel Kurland of Den of Geek gave the episode a 2.5 star rating out of 5 and wrote "“We Few, We Lucky Few, We Band of Gallaghers!” faces a tough task, but is able to handle the pressure. However, due to how half a year has gone by, a lot of this premiere feels like it's playing catch up to reorient the viewer. It's a rather disjointed episode that doesn't really offer enough of any character's storylines." Kimberly Ricci of Uproxx wrote "let's stop and think about when we first met Carl, nearly a decade ago. He was the character melting action figures in the microwave and felt like carefully controlled chaos personified. Now he's a snooze, but if that's my biggest disappointment with this season of Shameless, then the show's getting things done. The U.K. version of this series ran for eleven seasons, and I see no reason why the U.S. edition can't go there (and maybe beyond) as well."

Meaghan Darwish of TV Insider wrote "even without some of their key players, this group proves what viewers have known all along — they're there for each other when it matters." Paul Dailly of TV Fanatic gave the episode a 2.75 star rating out of 5, and wrote, "it's clear that Shameless is a shell of its former self. Most of the storylines have been done before, and some of the characters have become excruciating to watch."
