= Hermione Granger and the Quarter Life Crisis =

- Also known as: HGQLC
- Genre: Fantasy
- Created by: Eliyannah Amirah Yisrael
- Based on: Harry Potter
- Written by: Jessica Jenks, L. Olive Hernandez, Jonnell Burke, Megan Grogan
- Directed by: Eliyannah Amirah Yisrael
- Starring: Ashley Romans
- Country of origin: United States
- Original language: English
- No. of seasons: 2
- No. of episodes: 12

Production
- Producers: Megan Grogan, Alice Pearce, Marigrace Angelo
- Production locations: Los Angeles, California

Original release
- Network: YouTube
- Release: January 16, 2017 – 2019

Hermione Granger and the Quarter Life Crisis is a fan-created TV series focused on Hermione Granger's life after Hogwarts. The show is created and directed by Eliyannah Amirah Yisrael, written by Jessica Jenks, L. Olive Hernandez, Jonnell Burke, written and produced by Megan Grogan, produced by Alice Pearce and Marigrace Angelo. In the show, Ashley Romans plays Hermione, age 25, who has broken up with her long-time boyfriend, Ron Weasley, and apparated to Los Angeles where her past Hogwarts roommate Parvati Patil and her Muggle extended family live. Throughout the series, Hermione abandons her past approach to planning life and instead focuses on finding herself.

== Creation ==
Yisrael, the show creator, explores how Hermione Granger deals with the trauma of the Wizarding War and builds a life without Ron. In the series Hermione is portrayed as a black woman, unlike in the Warner Brothers' Harry Potter films. However, there is precedent for Granger being a black woman within the Harry Potter canon, as seen in the casting for Harry Potter and the Cursed Child.

== New characters ==
The series introduces a number of new characters from outside of the Harry Potter canon:

=== Juniper Dias ===
Juniper Dias, played by Stephanie Ezekiel, is Parvati's roommate in Los Angeles. She is smart and competitive, and perceives Hermione as a threat to her friendships and position as the smartest person in their friend group.

=== LaQuita Granger ===
LaQuita Granger, played by Tamara French, is Hermione Granger's muggle cousin. She owns and operates her own fashion design company.

=== Kang Tae Joon ===
Kang Tae Joon, played by Chase Yi, is a star Quidditch chaser. He is friends with Juniper and Parvati.

=== Tomi ===
Tomi, another young black witch and a friend of Hermione's from "the book store", is introduced in the final episode of the show. She is played by fantasy author Tomi Adeyemi (Children of Blood and Bone).
