= Step Back, Doors Closing =

2024 romantic comedy film

- Directed by: Carter Ward
- Written by: Carter Ward
- Produced by: Carter Ward; Kathryn Crabtree; Jane Hollon
- Starring: Carmen Berkeley; Reilly Walters; Michelle Macedo; Ashley Romans
- Cinematography: Jimmy Ferguson
- Edited by: Gordon Antell
- Music by: Paloma Estevez
- Production company: Arden Pictures
- Distributed by: Freestyle Releasing
- Release date: June 20, 2024 (Dances With Films)
- Running time: 98 minutes
- Country: United States
- Language: English

Step Back, Doors Closing is a 2024 American romantic comedy drama film written and directed by Carter Ward. The film is about two young adults who meet by chance and fall in love after spending the next 24 hours exploring Washington D.C. together. It premiered in June 2024 at the Dances With Films film festival where it was nominated for the Grand Jury Award. It also screened at the Catalina Film Festival, the Chandler International Film Festival, and the Omaha Film Festival.

== Plot ==
Julisa, played by Carmen Berkeley, is a Mexican-American graduate student from Los Angeles. She travels to Washington, D.C. to attend a women's leadership conference, but accidentally damages her phone at the airport. She is unable to contact her friend in the city but runs into Ryan, played by Reilly Walters, at the Metro while waiting for her friend. Ryan is returning home after attending a funeral in Boston following a recent breakup with his girlfriend of four years. Ryan offers to help Julisa by messaging an Instagram friend they realize they have in common. While waiting for that friend to respond, they start exploring Washington, D.C. together. Over the next 24 hours, they slowly fall in love through conversations about their hopes, dreams, and fears.

== Cast ==
- Carmen Berkeley as Julisa
- Reilly Walters as Ryan
- Michelle Macedo as Sierra, Julisa's friend
- Ashley Romans as Kesang, Ryan's friend

== Production ==
=== Development ===
Step Back, Doors Closing is the directorial debut of Carter Ward. He had previously worked as an assistant on films in New York City before moving to Los Angeles to pursue a career in filmmaking. He began developing the screenplay around 2015. In 2021, Ward founded the production company Arden Pictures, with Step Back, Doors Closing as its first project.

=== Filming ===
The film was shot in both Washington, D.C. and Los Angeles. The title references the automated announcement heard on the Washington Metro trains. Jimmy Ferguson served as cinematographer with the original score composed by Paloma Estevez.

== Release ==
Step Back, Doors Closing premiered at the Dances With Films film festival in Los Angeles in June 2024. It subsequently screened at the Catalina Film Festival in October 2024, Dances With Films in New York City in December 2024, the Chandler International Film Festival in January 2025, and the Omaha Film Festival in March 2025.

== Critical reception ==
Film Threat called Step Back, Doors Closing "a refreshing indie film" and praised its ending as realistic with the chemistry between the leads. Richard Propes of The Independent Critic gave the film 3.5 out of 4 stars, praising the lead performances. The film was compared to Richard Linklater's Before Sunrise by Vague Visages which wrote that the film is "essential viewing for Gen Z movie lovers, Washington D.C. natives and anyone who remains entranced by Linklater's 'Before Sunrise.'" Beyond the Cinerama Dome noted that the film "is stealing hearts while wandering through the Smithsonian museums."

On Rotten Tomatoes, the film holds a 100% approval rating. It was also nominated for the Grand Jury Award at the Dances With Films film festival, with Carmen Berkeley winning the award for Best Actress (U.S. Feature) at the Catalina Film Festival.
