= Face It, You're Gorgeous =

- Shameless episode
- Episode no.: Season 9 Episode 6
- Directed by: Allison Liddi-Brown
- Written by: Nancy M. Pimental
- Cinematography by: Anthony Hardwick
- Editing by: Michael S. Stern
- Original release date: October 14, 2018
- Running time: 54 minutes

Guest appearances
- Katey Sagal as Ingrid Jones (special guest star); Noel Fisher as Mickey Milkovich (special guest star); Courteney Cox as Jen Wagner (special guest star); Neal Bledsoe as Max Whitford; Andy Buckley as Randy; Jess Gabor as Kelly Keefe; Bob Saget as Father D'Amico; Abbie Cobb as Colette; Brian Scolaro as Baxter; Terrence Terrell as Antonio

Episode chronology
← Previous "Black-Haired Ginger"	Next → "Down Like the Titanic"
- Shameless season 9

"Face It, You're Gorgeous" is the sixth episode of the ninth season of the American television comedy drama Shameless, an adaptation of the British series of the same name. It is the 102nd overall episode of the series and was written by executive producer Nancy M. Pimental, and directed by Allison Liddi-Brown. It originally aired on Showtime on October 14, 2018.

The series is set on the South Side of Chicago, Illinois, and depicts the poor, dysfunctional family of Frank Gallagher, a neglectful single father of six: Fiona, Phillip, Ian, Debbie, Carl, and Liam. He spends his days drunk, high, or in search of money, while his children need to learn to take care of themselves. In the episode, Ian prepares for his prison sentence, while Fiona gets into a heated argument with Ford.

According to Nielsen Media Research, the episode was seen by an estimated 0.92 million household viewers and gained a 0.30 ratings share among adults aged 18–49. The episode received positive reviews from critics, who praised the closure to Ian's storyline.

== Plot ==
After taking the plea deal, Ian (Cameron Monaghan) makes arrangements at his house before he is set to go to prison, where he will begin his two-year sentence. To prepare for prison, he asks Carl (Ethan Cutkosky) and Kelly (Jess Gabor) to teach him how to survive and fight inmates.

Max (Neal Bledsoe) informs Fiona (Emmy Rossum) that the retirement home investment needs an influx of $25,000. When she isn't able to take back the initial $100,000 investment, Fiona decides against moving in with Ford (Richard Flood), causing an argument. Kevin (Steve Howey) and Veronica (Shanola Hampton) are visited by the girls' teacher, Sister Francis; she asked them to bring an object that display their parents' love and their daughter brought a dildo. Kevin and Veronica are forced to talk with the head of the school, Father D'Amico (Bob Saget), to forgive their daughter and themselves.

Lip (Jeremy Allen White) starts a job as a sponsor to Jen Wagner (Courteney Cox), a famous actress. Jen resists Lip's methods, so he is forced to become aggressive to get her to stop drinking. Jen slowly grows to accept Lip's help and even dines with his family. Frank (William H. Macy) takes Liam (Christian Isaiah) to a psych ward to find a "new" Monica, and is surprised to find Ingrid (Katey Sagal) subdued again. Ingrid is released by her ex-husband, Randy (Andy Buckley), and claims not to know Frank. He abandons Liam and follows her home, stating that she likes her for who she is.

When Ford does not return to the apartment, Fiona tracks his cellphone to apologize to him. However, she is astonished to find him at a house, where he lives with his wife and child. Ford claims that he is going through a divorce, but Fiona breaks up with him and drives off. Distracted, she crashes the car onto another. She refuses Ford's help and walks off. The following morning, Ian shares an emotional goodbye to his family and enters the correctional facility. As he gets into his room, he is joined by his cellmate. He turns, and is surprised to learn that his cellmate is Mickey (Noel Fisher). Mickey reveals that after being sent back to America, he informed on the cartel he worked at to get room privileges. They jump in the bunk bed and kiss, reunited at last.

== Production ==
=== Development ===
The episode was written by executive producer Nancy M. Pimental, and directed by Allison Liddi-Brown. It was Pimental's 21st writing credit, and Liddi-Brown's second directing credit.

=== Casting ===
On October 8, 2018, Cameron Monaghan announced that he would leave the series with the sixth episode of the season. He said, "All good things come to an end. An old cliche, but one that rings true with a sincerity and clarity especially in moments like these. Everything ends." However, he would return to the series with the season finale.

== Reception ==
=== Viewers ===
In its original American broadcast, "Face It, You're Gorgeous" was seen by an estimated 0.92 million household viewers with a 0.30 in the 18–49 demographics. This means that 0.30 percent of all households with televisions watched the episode. This was a 8% decrease in viewership from the previous episode, which was seen by an estimated 1.00 million household viewers with a 0.34 in the 18–49 demographics.

=== Critical reviews ===
"Face It, You're Gorgeous" received positive reviews from critics. Myles McNutt of The A.V. Club gave the episode a "B–" grade and wrote, "Shameless will need to find a way to pivot from the emotional catharsis of this ending into something approximating a cliffhanger in next week's mid-season finale, which still has a lot of work to do in order to get the show as a whole back on track."

Derek Lawrence of Entertainment Weekly wrote "And that is how we said goodbye to Ian Gallagher. I'm sure the internet will be delighted at that ending — I know I was."

Megan Vick of TV Guide wrote "A Gallavich reunion was the perfect way to show him coming into his own as a man, but also letting the audience know that he's going to be okay, even if we can't see him for a while." David Crow of Den of Geek gave the episode a 3.5 star rating out of 5 and wrote "So it's a fond farewell in an episode that was definitely superior by Shameless narrative standards. Yet it already causes me to worry for the future, as something was missing, and Ian hadn't even left yet."

Kimberly Ricci of Uproxx wrote "The audience is finally getting their desired reunion, and while these two aren't on a beach together, this works." Tamar Barbash of Telltale TV gave the episode a perfect 5 star rating out of 5 and wrote "it's not just that Mickey is there and that these two people who share this epic love story get to be together again. It's also that we don’t have to worry about Ian anymore. This entire episode pushes us to a place where we're just not sure Ian is going to be alright."

Jade Budowski of Decider wrote "This week's installment, “Face It, You’re Gorgeous”, pushes a handful of characters in pointless directions (as the show is wont to do as of late) and plunges the rest of them into dangerous waters. All cannot end well for the Gallagher clan." Paul Dailly of TV Fanatic gave the episode a 4.75 star rating out of 5, and wrote, "It's never easy to say goodbye to an original character, and while Ian's storylines have a knack for fizzling out, [the episode] featured the most beautiful conclusion."
