= Neal Bledsoe =

Canadian-American actor

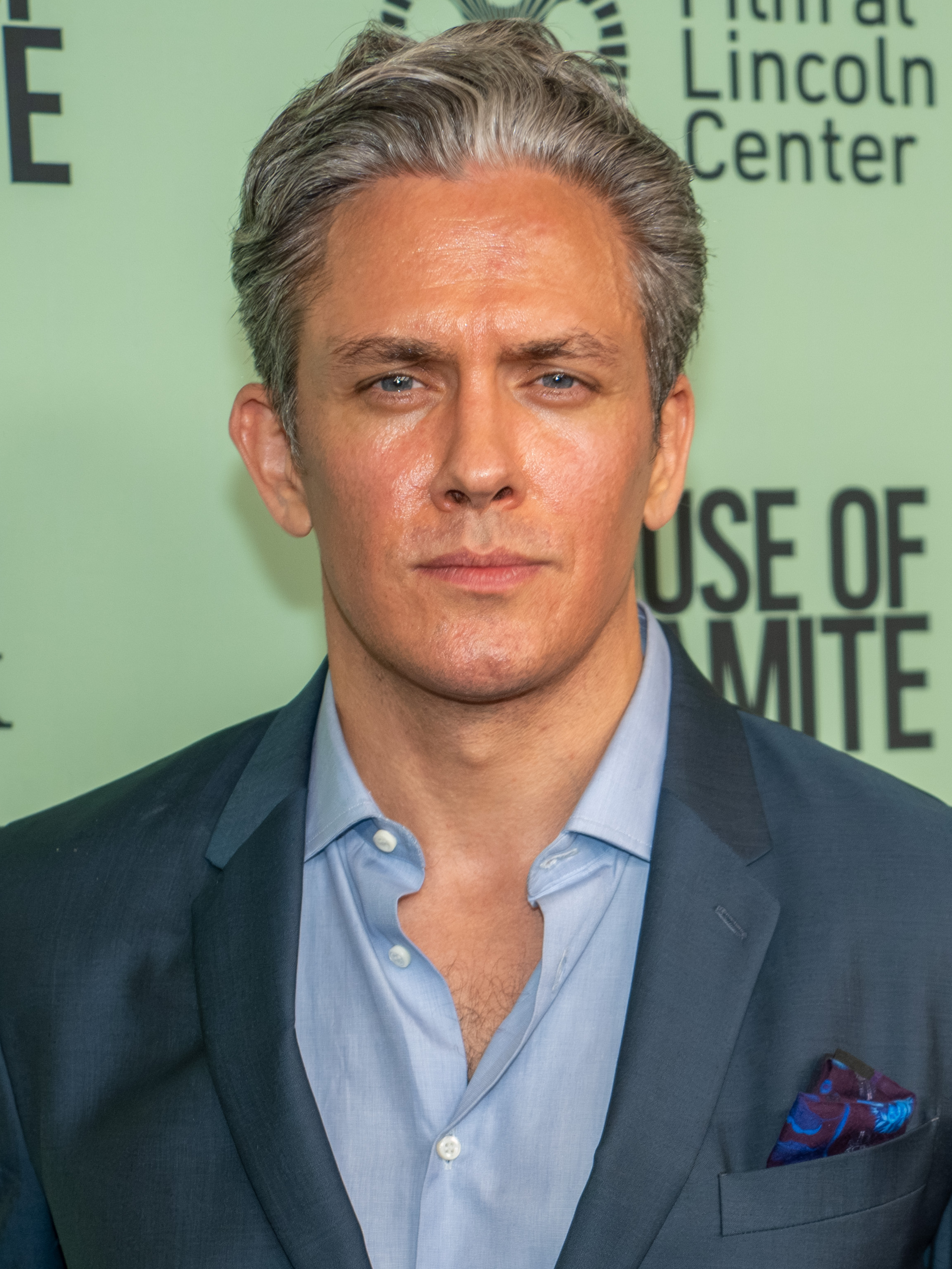
- Bledsoe in 2025
- Born: March 26, 1981 (age 45); Toronto, Ontario, Canada
- Education: University of North Carolina School of the Arts (BFA)
- Occupations: Actor, writer, filmmaker
- Years active: 2005–present

Neal Bledsoe (born March 26, 1981) is a Canadian-American actor, writer, and filmmaker. Known primarily for his acting work on Broadway, and on screens both large and small, Bledsoe has built a career spanning theater, film, television, filmmaking, art, poetry, short stories and journalism. He was once even an Old Spice Man.

== Early life ==
Bledsoe was born in Toronto, but moved as a baby back to his family's hometown of Seattle, Washington where he grew up. He attended Roosevelt High School (Seattle) and Garfield High School (Seattle) in Seattle, Ascent within the CEDU system of schools, before finally graduating from the Shawnigan Lake School and then spending a post-graduate year at the Idyllwild Arts Academy, to grow as an actor and a writer. It was at the last of these two schools where he began to first publish his short stories and poems.

In college, he was accepted to the North Carolina School of the Arts where he studied with their world-class faculty was mentored under the renowned theater director, Gerald Freedman, earning a BFA in 2005.

== Career ==
=== Actor ===
Bledsoe got a quick start out of school, booking a pilot opposite Kelly Lynch. He worked steadily for the next few years, until he had his breakthrough in 2009 first on Gossip Girl and then on Ugly Betty as, Tyler, the long lost son of Judith Light.

He then went on to star on the shows Law and Order: SVU, Smash, Ironside, The Man in the High Castle, with Rufus Sewell, The Mysteries of Laura as the long-time love interest of Debra Messing, Timeless, Code Black , Shameless opposite Emmy Rossum, among many others.

He has won several awards for his work in independent films such as Junction, West End and After the Sun Fell. He also has appeared in both Revolutionary Road and Sex and the City 2. He starred opposite Val Kilmer in the western A Soldier's Revenge. He will next be seen in Kathryn Bigelow's upcoming Netflix film A House of Dynamite (2025), as the husband of Rebecca Ferguson.

On the stage, he worked on the Broadway production of Impressionism, the world premiere of Stephen Wadsworth's Figaro Plays at the McCarter Theatre and Michael Arden's award-winning production of The Pride at the Wallis Annenberg Center for the Performing Arts. Most recently, he appeared on Broadway opposite Denzel Washington and Jake Gyllenhaal in Othello (2025), where he played the Duke of Venice and was the understudy for Gyllenhaal's Iago.

He appeared in several campaigns for Tiffany and Co, opposite Dutch model, Doutzen Kroes and for Old Spice.

In December 2022, Bledsoe announced that he was leaving the Great American Family network because of their anti-LGBTQ stance. Bledsoe stated, "the thought that my work could be used to deliberately discriminate against anyone horrifies and infuriates me."

=== Writer ===
As a writer, he has written films, poems, short stories, cartoons, essays and articles. In 2014, he became a contributor to Sports Illustrated's MMQB. His 2016 long-form series, The Delicate Moron, chronicled his attempt to play for the Los Angeles Kiss of the Arena Football League. He's also written for Men's Health magazine on former NFL running back and Ballers writer, Rashard Mendenhall and Variety.

=== Filmmaker ===
In 2015, he received a commission to write and direct and star in the short film Primary. The film examines the subject of open relationships and was heavily influenced by the work of John Cassavetes, Esther Perel and Helen Fisher, as well as months of extensive interviews with a diverse range of people from across the relationship spectrum.

== Filmography ==
=== Film ===
Year	Title	Role	Notes
2005	The Ridge	Noah	Direct-to-video
2008	Revolutionary Road	Party guest	
2009	Winked Out	Satan	Short film
2009	Under New Management	FBI agent #1	
2010	Sex and the City 2	Kevin	
2011	The Walken Dead	The Walkens	Short film
2011	Highrise	Rory	Short film
2011	A Kiss for Jed	Jed Wood	
2012	Junction	Donald	
2013	You There?	Lance	Short film
2013	West End	Vic Trevi	
2013	Amateurs	Brad	
2014	Grand Street	Hewitt Devoe	
2016	The Morning the Sun Fell Down	Brandon	
2017	Police State	John	
2017	Primary	Mike	Short film
2018	The Labyrinth & The Long Road	The client	
2020	A Soldier's Revenge	Frank	
2022	Susie Searches	Brady Wren	
2025	A House of Dynamite	Ben Walker	

=== Television ===
Year	Title	Role	Notes
2005	Guiding Light	Quinn	2 episodes
2007	CSI: NY	Sam Friar	Episode: "...Comes Around"
2007	Six Degrees	Roger	Episode: "Objects in the Mirror"
2007	As the World Turns	Gary Bradshaw	3 episodes
2008	Lipstick Jungle	Leading man	Episode: "Pilot"
2008	Law & Order: Criminal Intent	Kevyn	Episode: "Please Note We Are No Longer Accepting Letters of Recommendation from Henry Kissinger"
2009	The Beautiful Life: TBL	Dmitiri Kane	Episode: "The Beautiful Aftermath"
2009	Gossip Girl	Josh Elis	Episode: "Enough About Eve"
2009–2010	Ugly Betty	Tyler Meade-Hartley	7 episodes
2010–2011	Law & Order: Special Victims Unit	CSU Clifton Montgomery	3 episodes
2011	Body of Proof	Stephen Burnett	Episode: "Society Hill"
2011	Blue Bloods	Cassidy	Episode: "Silver Star"
2012	Smash	John Goodwin	7 episodes
2013	Ironside	Teddy	Main role
2015–2016	The Mysteries of Laura	Tony Abbott	11 episodes
2015	The Man in the High Castle	Captain Connolly	4 episodes
2016	Timeless	Robert Todd Lincoln	Episode: "The Assassination of Abraham Lincoln"
2016	Code Black	Paul Wentworth	Episode: "1.0 Bodies"
2017	The Last Tycoon	Axel	Episode: "A Brady-American Christmas"
2017	Coming Home for Christmas	Robert Marley	Television film (Hallmark)
2018–2019	Shameless	Max Whitford	4 episodes
2019–2020	NCIS: New Orleans	Man in the red suit	3 episodes
2020	Lincoln Rhyme: Hunt for the Bone Collector	Greg Vaughn	Episode: "Requiem"
2020	Agents of S.H.I.E.L.D.	Wilfred "Freddy" Malick	2 episodes
2020	The Christmas Carousel	Prince Whitaker	Television film (Hallmark)
2021	Younger	Vince	Episode: "The Last Unicorn"
2022	The Winter Palace	Prince Henry of Concordia	Television film (GAC Family)
2022	The Blacklist	Maverick Sawyer	Episode: "Genuine Models Inc. (No. 176)"
2022	Christmas at the Drive-In		Television film (GAC Family)
