= Ashley Romans =

American actress

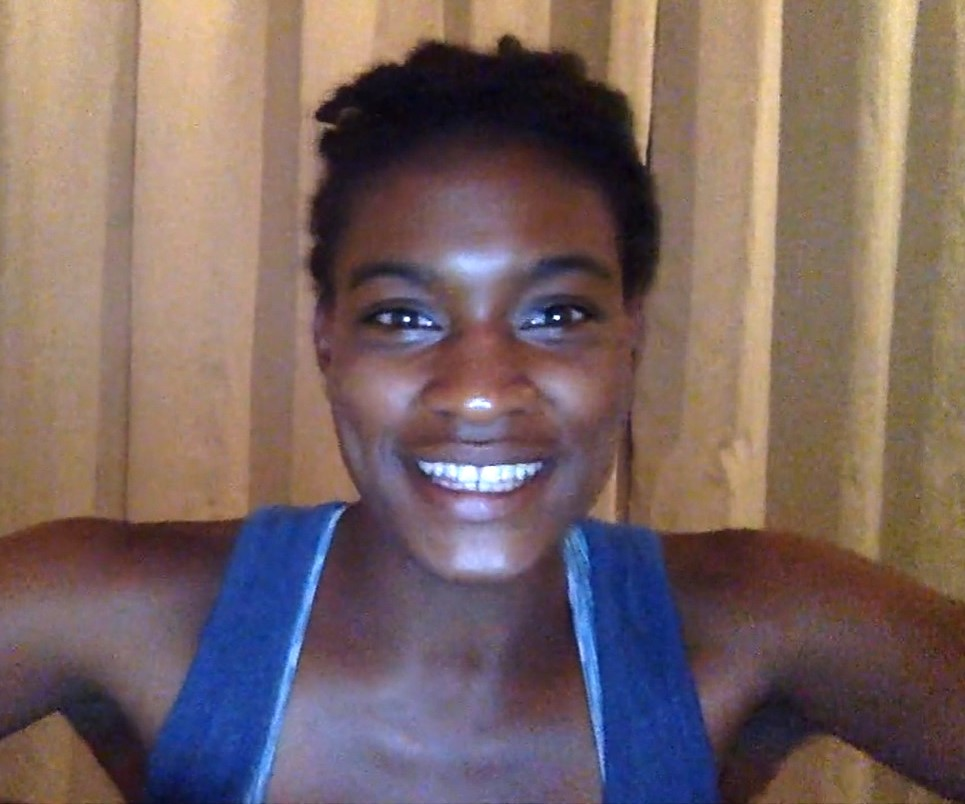
- Romans in 2018
- Born: December 28, 1992 (age 33); New York City, New York, U.S.
- Education: Pace University (BFA)
- Occupation: Actress
- Years active: 2011–present

Ashley Romans (born December 28, 1992) is an American actress, known for playing Agent 355 in Y: The Last Man, Hermione Granger in Hermione Granger and the Quarter Life Crisis, and Tabitha Hutter on NOS4A2.

== Early life ==
Romans attended Scotch Plains Fanwood High School in Union County, New Jersey.

She was originally inspired to pursue acting while watching her older sister play Ruth in her high school production of A Raisin in the Sun. She studied theater at Pace University, graduating in 2015.

== Career ==
In 2017, she won the Los Angeles Drama Critics Circle Award for Lead Performance in the play Rotterdam, in which she plays a character undergoing gender transition in conjunction with a partner who is struggling with coming out to her parents as a lesbian. In 2020, Romans replaced Lashana Lynch in the lead role of Agent 355 in the television adaptation of the comic book series Y: The Last Man. The series premiered in 2021.

== Filmography ==
=== Film ===
Year	Title	Role	Notes
2014	Slave Girls on the Moon	P. Grier	
2016	TV Junkie	Karen	Short
2016	August Ninth	Zora	Short
2017	Christmas Crime Story	Heather Harrington	
2019	The Devil Lives in Clarksville County	Trish Walker	Short
2019	Finding Johnny	Janelle	TV movie
2020	Salt in the Wound	Simone	Short
2020	First-Rounders	Shy Girl	Short
2021	Lulu	Lulu	Short
2024	Step Back, Doors Closing	Kesang	
2024	Afraid	Sam	

=== Television ===
Year	Title	Role	Notes
2017–2018	Hermione Granger and the Quarter Life Crisis	Hermione Granger	Main cast
2018	I'm Dying Up Here	Alvira	Recurring cast: season 2
2018	Shameless	Alex	Recurring cast: Season 9
2019	Insignificant Other	Ella	Episode: "Aging, etc."
2019–2020	NOS4A2	Tabitha Hutter	Recurring cast: season 1, main cast: season 2
2021	Y: The Last Man	Agent 355	Main cast
2023	Mrs. Davis	Joy	Episode: "The Final Intercut: So I'm Your Horse"
2023	The Hurt Unit	Nora	ABC pilot
2024	Genius	Ella Mae	Recurring
2025	The Pitt	Joyce St. Claire	Recurring; 4 episodes
2025	The Morning Show	Tunde Johnson	Episode: "Amari"
2026	Nemesis	Tessa Grant	Episode: "Repercussions"
2026	Survival of the Thickest	Imani	4 episodes
