= Kate Miner (actress) =

American actress, model and musician

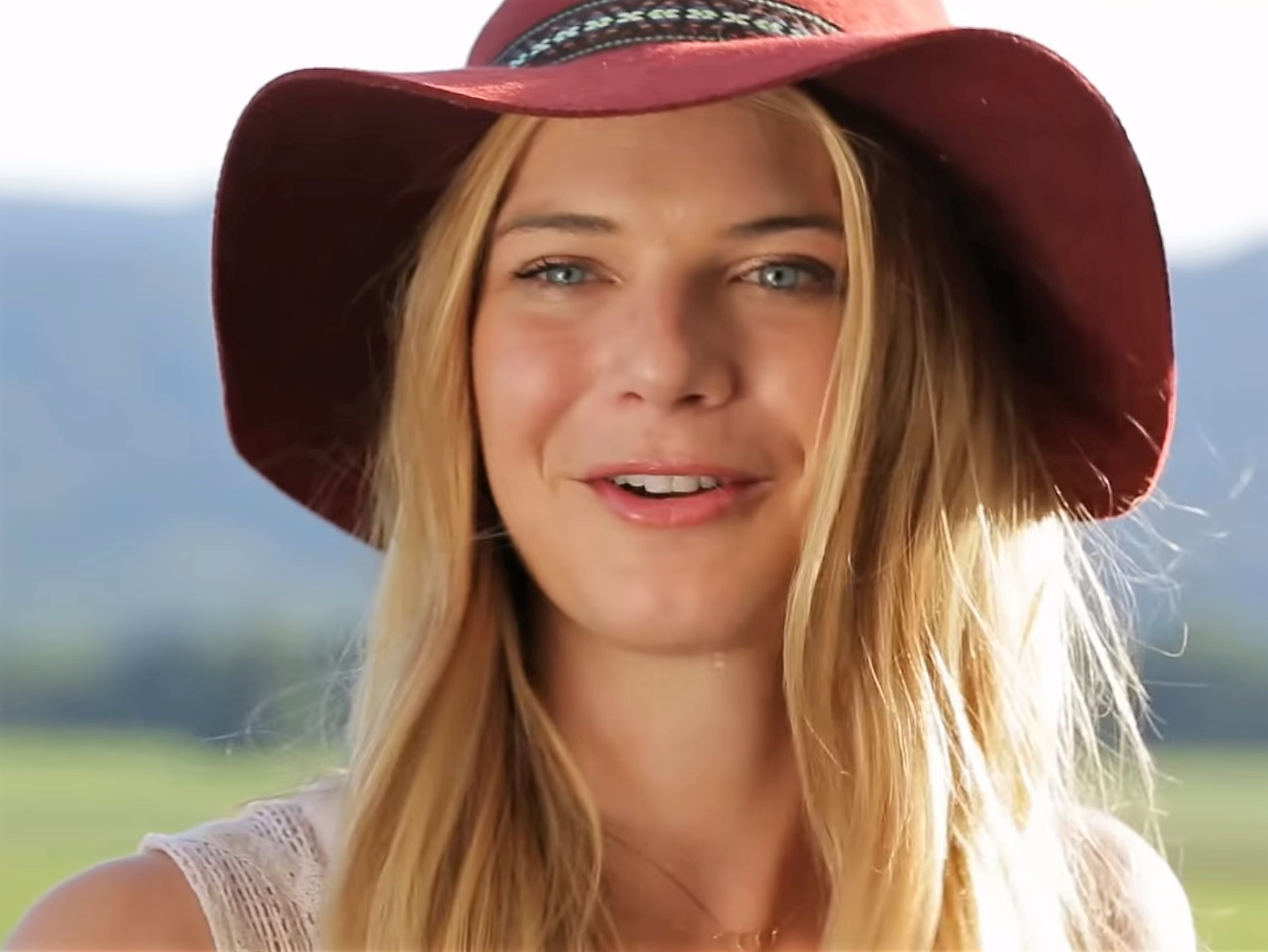
- Miner on PureVolume in 2014
- Occupation: Actress
- Years active: 2002–present
- Spouse: Justin Miner (m. 2012)
- Children: 2
- Website: www.thisisminer.com

Kate Miner, also known as Kate Lang Johnson, is an American actress. Notable film credits include Fifty Shades of Black, The Campaign, Fired Up, Behind the Mask: The Rise of Leslie Vernon, and A Leading Man.

Miner is a main cast member in seasons nine to eleven of the American series Shameless as Phillip Gallagher's love interest. She was a lead actor in the NBC miniseries Persons Unknown and on season three of the series Necessary Roughness. She also had leading roles in the ABC Family pilot Phys. Ed and the NBC pilot Holding Patterns. though neither show was picked up into a series.

== Career ==
=== Acting ===
Miner is known for her roles on Showtime's Shameless (seasons 9–11), USA Network's Necessary Roughness and NBC's Persons Unknown in addition to playing Will Ferrell's mistress in the 2012 comedy film The Campaign and Marlon Wayans' assistant in the 2016 comedy spoof Fifty Shades of Black.

She has guest starred or recurred on Grey's Anatomy, Disjointed, Two and a Half Men, Scandal, CSI: NY, The Deep End, Boston Public, Malcolm in the Middle, Drake & Josh, CSI: Miami, Quintuplets, Summerland, Ugly Betty, ER, Life, Hellcats, and Secret Girlfriend. Additional film credits include Fired Up, A Leading Man, Street and the indie horror flick Behind the Mask: The Rise of Leslie Vernon.

=== Music ===
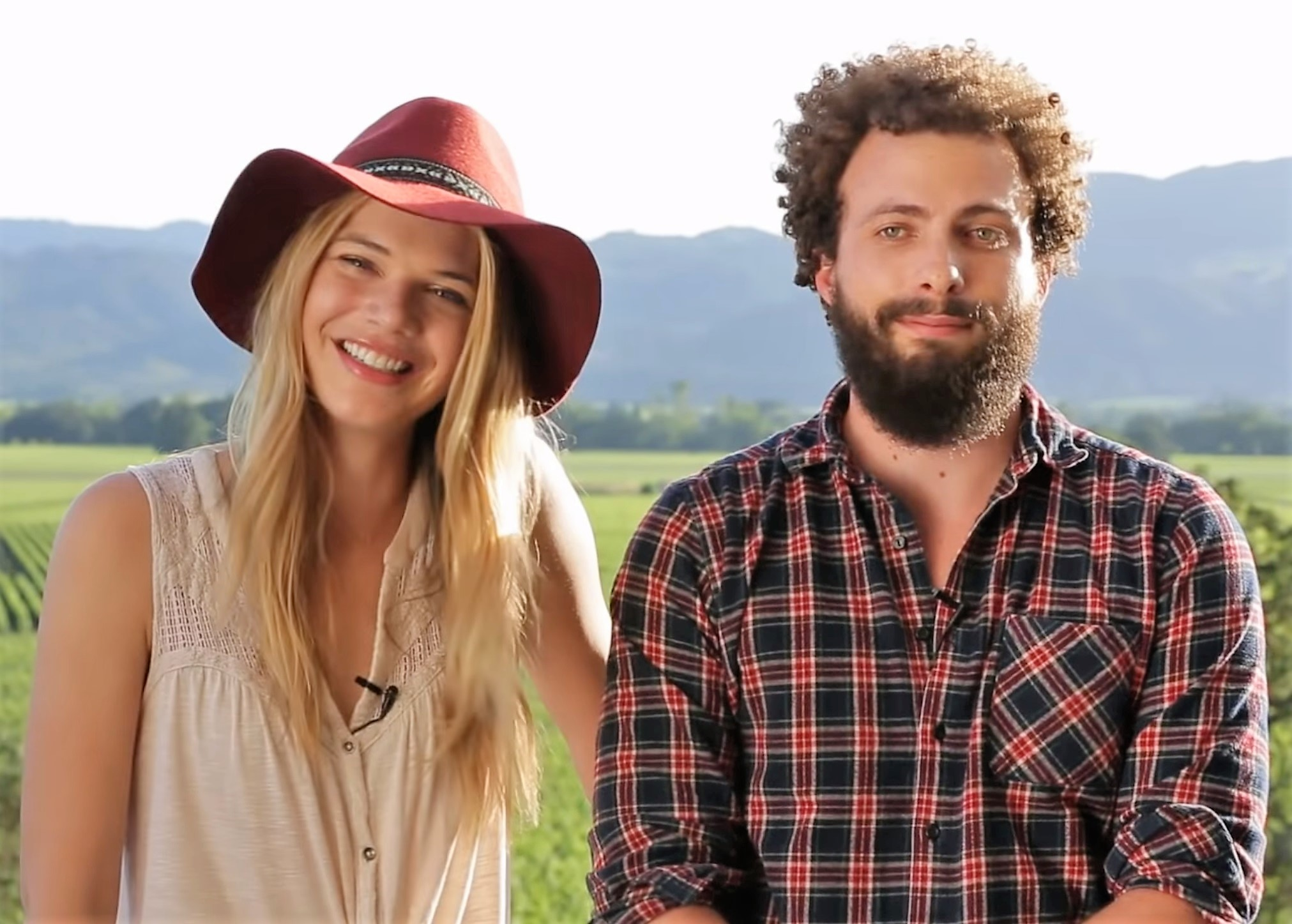
Kate and Justin Miner on PureVolume in 2014

In 2012, she married her college sweetheart, musician Justin Miner. Kate sings and plays keys, mandolin, and harmonica in their band, Miner.

Their band performed on season 3 of Hart of Dixie. She and her husband have composed songs featured on Elementary, House of Lies, and Hart of Dixie as well as the feature film Project Almanac.

In 2018, Kate released an EP with her new project, Winslow with bandmate Briana Lane. The duo are signed with Kobalt under AWAL Records. Their song 'Origami Tiger' was featured on the soundtrack for the film Luce starring Octavia Spencer and Naomi Watts.
