= Michael Patrick McGill =

American actor

- Born: July 2, 1973 (age 53); Appleton, Wisconsin, U.S.
- Occupation: Actor
- Years active: 2001–present
- Spouse: Amy McGill (m. 2012)

Michael Patrick McGill (born July 2, 1973) is an American actor who has appeared in film and television. He is most known for playing Tommy on Shameless, Slim on Desolation Canyon, and Thunderbolt Ross in X-Men '97.

== Filmography ==
=== Film ===
Year	Title	Role	Notes
2001	Instinct to Kill	Undercover 2	
2004	The Good Fight	Father Pino	
2004	Yard Sale	Alan	
2005	Chasing Ghosts	Officer Sirko	
2005	Dating Games People Play	Dwayne	
2007	Careless	Neighbor #1	
2013	Dark Skies	Ratner's Father	
2013	Sake-Bomb	Officer	
2013	Lost on Purpose	Lumber Junction Manager	
2013	Blood Shot	Carl	
2013	Bad Words	Beet Red Father	
2014	White Bird in a Blizzard	Aaron	
2014	Jersey Boys	Officer Mike	
2014	Mall	Officer Ed	
2014	House of Secrets	Detective Baker	
2015	Walter	Priest	
2015	Danny Collins	Neighbor Steve	
2016	Message from the King	Garbage Man	
2017	Quality Problems	Alan	
2017	The 60 Yard Line	Lambrew Beer Dad	
2018	Beautiful Boy	Locksmith	Uncredited
2018	Saving Flora	Dad	
2019	Annabelle Comes Home	Cop	
2019	Secret Obsession	Captain Fitzpatrick	
2020	Sammy-Gate	Deep Throat	
2020	Run Sweetheart Run	Officer	
2021	Donny's Bar Mitzvah	Tom	
2021	Grace and Grit	Father Michael	

=== Television ===
Year	Title	Role	Notes
2001	Touched by an Angel	Babe Ruth	Episode: "The Perfect Game"
2001	Just Shoot Me!	Irish Bartender	Episode: "The Two Faces of Finch"
2001	Citizen Baines	Policeman	Episode: "Out in the Rain"
2002	JAG	Sid	Episode: "Odd Man Out"
2002	The District	Gary Bristow	Episode: "Faith"
2002	The Mind of the Married Man	Large Man	Episode: "Never Stop"
2002, 2003	NYPD Blue	Uniform #2, Uniform #1	2 episodes
2002–2009	ER	Various roles	6 episodes
2003	Angel	Checkpoint Guard	Episode: "Players"
2003	Fastlane	Diner Manager	Episode: "Iced"
2003	Malcolm in the Middle	Dave	Episode: "Baby: Part 2"
2003	Lucky	Blackjack Dealer	Episode: "Lie, Cheat & Deal"
2003	Without a Trace	Manager	Episode: "Revelations"
2003	Charmed	Ray	Episode: "The Power of Three Blondes"
2003	Skin	Hanson	Episode: "Blowback"
2003–2007	Passions	Various roles	15 episodes
2004	The Practice	Officer Gailey	Episode: "Police State"
2004	Rodney	Guy at Party	Episode: "Pilot"
2004	Clubhouse	Examiner Reporter	Episode: "Trade Talks"
2005	Desperate Housewives	Crime Scene Policeman	Episode: "Every Day a Little Death"
2005	Blind Justice	Driver	Episode: "Doggone"
2005	Over There	Father Feeney	Episode: "Roadblock Duty"
2005	Still Standing	Noom	Episode: "Still Losin' It"
2005	Duck Dodgers	Various voices	3 episodes
2006	CSI: Crime Scene Investigation	Ruben Caster	Episode: "Pirates of the Third Reich"
2006	The Loop	Ron	Episode: "The Year of the Dog"
2006	Everybody Hates Chris	Janitor	Episode: "Everybody Hates Promises"
2006	My Name Is Earl	Feminist Shirt Guy	Episode: "Robbed a Stoner Blind"
2006	Standoff	Scott Freymuth	Episode: "Peer Group"
2006	Desolation Canyon	Cecil 'Slim' Moldin	Television film
2006, 2015	Two and a Half Men	Joseph, Officer Smith	2 episodes
2007	Scrubs	Officer Brady	Episode: "My Perspective"
2007	Day Break	Deputy	Episode: "What If She's the Key?"
2007	What About Brian	Rowland	2 episodes
2007	NCIS	Joe Kelly	Episode: "Trojan Horse"
2007	Side Order of Life	Guard #1	Episode: "Whose Sperm Is It Anyway?"
2007	Entourage	Cop	Episode: "The Young and the Stoned"
2007	Final Approach	LAPD Officer	Television film
2007	Lincoln Heights	Officer Denis, Cop #2	3 episodes
2007	Boston Legal	Officer Brian Whistler	2 episodes
2007	Union Jackass	Man with Jackhammer	Episode: "Pilot"
2007, 2012	The Office	Kenny Anderson	3 episodes
2008	Going to Pieces Screaming Peace	Officer	Miniseries
2008	Wizards of Waverly Place	Umpire	Episode: "The Supernatural"
2008	Swingtown	Bill Baker	Episode: "Love Will Find a Way"
2008	Ladies of the House	Building Inspector	Television film
2008–2009	Monk	Various roles	3 episodes
2009	Bones	Oklahoma Officer	Episode: "Double Trouble in the Panhandle"
2009	Southland	M.C.	Episode: "Mozambique"
2009	Raising the Bar	Dean O' Farrell Jr.	Episode: "Trust Me"
2009	Sons of Anarchy	CSU Cop	Episode: "Falx Cerebri"
2009	Lie to Me	Officer Barnes	Episode: "Honey"
2010	Men of a Certain Age	Jack	Episode: "Father's Fraternity"
2010	The New Adventures of Old Christine	Man in parking garage	Episode: "A Whale of a Tale"
2010	Private Practice	Marshall	Episode: "'Til Death Do Us Part"
2010	Hawthorne	Officer Nathan Reed	Episode: "Afterglow"
2010	Sons of Tucson	Officer Jerry	Episode: "Glenn's Birthday"
2010	Medium	City Worker	Episode: "Bring Your Daughter to Work Day"
2010–2014	The Unemployment of Danny London	Larry	6 episodes
2011	Accidentally in Love	Sergeant Costrow	Television film
2011	Better with You	Cop	Episode: "Better Without a Couch"
2011	The Middle	Cop #1	Episode: "Spring Cleaning"
2011	Dexter	Troy	Episode: "Get Gellar"
2011–2017	Days of Our Lives	Ward Guard	4 episodes
2011–2021	Shameless	Tommy	91 episodes
2012	Mike & Molly	Officer #1	Episode: "Victoria Can't Drive"
2012	We're Alive	Sean	Episode: "The Thirty-First"
2012	90210	Cop	Episode: "Babes in Toyland"
2012	Shadow of Fear	Officer Hughes	Television film
2012	CSI: Miami	Pete Evans	Episode: "Habeas Corpse"
2012	The Client List	Coach Ed Meyers	Episode: "Ring True"
2012	The Secret Life of the American Teenager	Officer	Episode: "The Splits"
2012	Hollywood Heights	Wally	Episode: "Waking Up"
2012	Ben and Kate	Ron	Episode: "Career Day"
2012	Man Up!	Glenn	Episode: "Up All Night"
2013	Enlightened	Security Guard	Episode: "The Key"
2013	Parks and Recreation	Sanitation Steve	Episode: "Women in Garbage"
2013	Scandal	Clerk	Episode: "Top of the Hour"
2013	Cougar Town	Richard Vernon	Episode: "The Criminal Kind"
2013	Devious Maids	Detective	Episode: "Pilot"
2013	Perception	Dave Richards	Episode: "Caleidoscope"
2013	Work It	M.C.	Episode: "Surprise Package"
2013	Divorce: A Love Story	Cop	Television film
2013–2014	Beware the Batman	Officer O'Brien (voice)	3 episodes
2014	Hart of Dixie	Duke	2 episodes
2014	Mad Men	Dean Evans	Episode: "Waterloo"
2014	The Fosters	Coach Spears	6 episodes
2014	The League	Umpire	Episode: "Tefl-Andre"
2015	Why? with Hannibal Buress	Cop #2	Episode: "8th of July Celebration!"
2015	Aquarius	Jim Whalen	4 episodes
2016	New Girl	Mall Cop	Episode: "A Chill Day In"
2016	His Secret Past	Detective Powell	Television film
2016, 2021	Bosch	John Iverson	3 episodes
2017	Pure Genius	Jim Coleman	Episode: "Hero Worship"
2017	Santa Clarita Diet	Ed	Episode: "Attention to Detail"
2017	Lifeline	Spencer	2 episodes
2017	The Big Bang Theory	Police Officer	Episode: "The Explosion Implosion"
2017	The Bold and the Beautiful	Alex	3 episodes
2017	CLIMAX! The Series	Gus	Episode: "Sarah Helps Feed the Famished"
2018	Wisdom of the Crowd	Officer Rick Hoff	Episode: "Root Directory"
2018	Not For Nothin'	McGill	2 episodes
2018	Here and Now	Black Lives Matter Man	Episode: "Yes"
2018–2019	Gods of Medicine	Grady Mathis	4 episodes
2019	All Rise	Detective Curtis Perry	Episode: "Devotees in the Courthouse of Love"
2020	Station 19	Bob	Episode: "Out of Control"
2020	Grey's Anatomy	Bob Corson	Episode: "No Time for Despair"
2021	What If...?	Thunderbolt Ross (voice)	2 episodes
2024	X-Men '97	Thunderbolt Ross (voice)	Episode: "Bright Eyes"
