= Shameless season 1 =

Shameless
- Season 1
- DVD cover
- Showrunner: John Wells
- Starring: William H. Macy; Emmy Rossum; Justin Chatwin; Ethan Cutkosky; Shanola Hampton; Steve Howey; Emma Kenney; Cameron Monaghan; Jeremy Allen White; Laura Slade Wiggins; Joan Cusack
- No. of episodes: 12

Release
- Original network: Showtime
- Original release: January 9 – March 27, 2011

Season chronology
- Next → Season 2

The first season of Shameless, an American comedy-drama television series based on the British series of the same name by Paul Abbott, premiered on January 9, 2011, at Sunday 10:00 p.m. EST on the Showtime television network. Executive producers are John Wells, Paul Abbott and Andrew Stearn, with producer Michael Hissrich. The season concluded after 12 episodes on March 27, 2011. The show's season premiere was watched by 982,000 viewers, making it the network's biggest turnout for a series premier since Dead Like Me in 2003. The episode airing January 30, "Casey Casden", received 1.45 million total viewers, making Shameless the best performing first-year drama on Showtime. The season finale scored 1.16 million viewers.

== Plot ==
The first season of Shameless depicts the dysfunctional Gallagher family, consisting of Frank Gallagher, a single, alcoholic, and trashy father, and his six children, who live in the South Side of Chicago, Illinois. After Frank's bipolar wife Monica abandoned the family years prior to the first season, the family has been run by Frank's eldest daughter Fiona, who raises her five other siblings: the extraordinarily intelligent Lip, goofy and strong-hearted Ian, confident and overbearing Debbie, troublemaking and unruly Carl, and baby Liam, who is Black, despite a paternity test, taken in the later half of the season, revealing that Frank is his biological father. Often involved in the Gallagher's lives are their neighbors, Kevin and Veronica, who fake a marriage mid-season to obtain a substantial dowry.

The season's core story revolves around Steve Wilton, an affluent man whom Fiona and Veronica meet at a dance club. Fiona begins a relationship with Steve and discovers that he is a high-end car thief. Fiona's childhood friend and police officer, Tony Markovich, expresses interest in dating Fiona, though she ultimately turns him down. When Steve leaves town to visit his family in Lake Forest, it is revealed that his real name is Jimmy Lishman and he comes from a wealthy family who believes he is away at medical school. When Debbie discovers Steve's secret, she agrees to keep it a secret from Fiona, but does notify Steve's mother about his double life.

A secondary plot involves Ian's closeted homosexuality, which is gradually discovered by Lip and a friend, Mandy Milkovich, who agrees to pretend to be his girlfriend. Ian is in a sexual relationship with his unhappily married adult boss Kash, the owner of a local convenience store. Kash's wife, Linda, discovers the affair through the store's newly installed security cameras, and blackmails Kash into impregnating her. Mandy's thug brother Mickey Milkovich openly shoplifts from the store and insults a helpless Kash. When Ian confronts Mickey, the two unexpectedly have sex and begin a casual sexual relationship. After Kash finds out, he angrily shoots Mickey in the leg during a confrontation; Mickey is arrested for attempted theft and Kash is praised for his efforts. In the final episode, Ian comes out to Fiona, who accepts his sexuality.

Frank's eldest son, Lip, is in an open relationship with the promiscuous Karen Jackson, though Lip wants their relationship to be more than a casual fling. Karen's mother, Sheila, is a nice but kooky housewife diagnosed with severe agoraphobia. Frank becomes romantic with Sheila and moves in with her, though he's mainly there to freeload and cash on Sheila's disability checks, much to Karen's dismay. Karen has a strained relationship with her estranged father Eddie, who is controlling and belittling towards his family. In an attempt to reconcile with Karen, Eddie invites her to a purity ball, a father/daughter event where girls pledge their chastity. When Karen delves into her extensive sexual history as required by the ball, Eddie angrily calls her a whore. Sheila furiously kicks Eddie out of her house, overcoming her agoraphobia in the process. Eddie's betrayal and lack of affection causes Karen to have a mental breakdown; wanting to get revenge on her father, Karen rapes an incapacitated Frank, broadcasting the incident on a video blog that she sends to Eddie and his co-workers. Consequently, a guilt-stricken Karen breaks up with Lip. Humiliated over the video and past events, Eddie commits suicide by jumping in a frozen lake. Both Frank and Karen separately apologize to Lip for the video.

In the final episodes, Lip and Ian are arrested after being caught driving one of Steve's stolen cars, straining Fiona and Steve's relationship, though Fiona admits that she may be falling in love with Steve. Meanwhile, Tony discovers the truth about Steve, attacks him and gives him an ultimatum: turn himself in or leave Fiona and disappear without a trace. Steve tries to convince Fiona to go with him to Costa Rica, but a conflicted Fiona eventually declines his offer, causing him to leave alone. Fiona instead takes up an offer from a new friend, Jasmine, to work an office job to further care for her family.

== Cast and characters ==
=== Main ===
- William H. Macy as Frank Gallagher
- Emmy Rossum as Fiona Gallagher
- Justin Chatwin as Steve Wilton / Jimmy Lishman
- Ethan Cutkosky as Carl Gallagher
- Shanola Hampton as Veronica "V" Fisher
- Steve Howey as Kevin "Kev" Ball
- Emma Kenney as Debbie Gallagher
- Cameron Monaghan as Ian Gallagher
- Jeremy Allen White as Phillip "Lip" Gallagher
- Laura Slade Wiggins as Karen Jackson

=== Special guest star ===
- Joan Cusack as Sheila Jackson

=== Recurring ===
- Tyler Jacob Moore as Tony Markovich
- Joel Murray as Eddie Jackson
- Pej Vahdat as Kash
- Marguerite Moreau as Linda
- Jane Levy as Amanda "Mandy" Milkovich
- Noel Fisher as Mikhailo Aleksandr "Mickey" Milkovich
- Michael Patrick McGill as Tommy
- Missy Doty as Jess
- Madison Davenport as Ethel
- Dennis Cockrum as Terry Milkovich

=== Guests ===
- Kerry O'Malley as Kate
- Amy Smart as Jasmine Hollander
- Louise Fletcher as Peggy Gallagher
- Dennis Boutsikaris as Professor Hearst
- Chloe Webb as Monica Gallagher
- Jim Hoffmaster as Kermit
- Vanessa Bell Calloway as Carol Fisher
- Gloria LeRoy as Aunt Ginger
- Julia Duffy as Candace Lishman
- Carlease Burke as Roberta
- Anthony Anderson as Marty Fisher
- Brent Jennings as Principal Monroe
- Alex Borstein as Lou Deckner
- Kristoffer Ryan Winters as Clayton Gallagher
- David Wells as Father Pete

== Episodes ==
No. overall	No. in season	Title	Directed by	Written by	Original release date	Prod. code	US viewers (millions)
1	1	"Pilot"	Mark Mylod	Teleplay by : Paul Abbott and John Wells; British Episode by: Paul Abbott	January 9, 2011	296769	0.98
Alcoholic Chicagoan father, Frank Gallagher, is of no use to his dysfunctional family. With their mother absent, eldest daughter Fiona has been forced to take care of Frank and her five younger siblings: the intelligent Lip, the strong-hearted Ian, the sweet-hearted Debbie, the troublemaking Carl and baby Liam. At a dance club, Fiona's purse gets stolen; a handsome stranger named Steve tries to retrieve the purse. The following day, Steve buys Fiona a new Samsung washing machine to win her over. An impressed Fiona goes on a date with Steve and discovers that he is a car thief. Lip has suspicions about Ian's sexuality, and takes him to a classmate, Karen Jackson, to confirm his suspicions. Karen's religious father, Eddie, later discovers Karen performing oral sex on an unfazed Ian. Repulsed by his daughter's actions, Eddie attempts to beat Lip and Ian, then later abandons his family. While visiting the local market that Ian works at, Lip discovers that Ian is having sex with his married boss Kash. Although Lip disapproves of the relationship, he shows acceptance over Ian's sexuality.
2	2	"Frank the Plank"	John Wells	Teleplay by : Paul Abbott and John Wells; British Episode by: Paul Abbott	January 16, 2011	2J5402	0.81
Steve and Frank get into an intense argument when Frank hits Ian. The next day, Frank suddenly goes missing. A manhunt for Frank begins, and the police get involved. Heavily intoxicated from the previous night, Frank is arrested in Toronto, with no memory of how he arrived there. After being confronted by Fiona, Steve admits that he smuggled Frank across the border while stealing a car, feeling he could finally solve their family issues; Fiona punches Steve and orders him to get Frank back. After Steve successfully smuggles Frank back home in an RV, Fiona breaks up with him. Tony Markovich, a local cop who has had feelings for Fiona since childhood, asks her out on a date, which she considers. Frank is invited into the home of Sheila Jackson, Karen's agoraphobic and mentally ill mother. After having a brief sexual liaison with Sheila, Frank officially moves in with her, to Karen's dismay.
3	3	"Aunt Ginger"	Stephen Hopkins	Nancy M. Pimental	January 23, 2011	2J5403	0.90
Fiona has sex with Tony, but is horrified to learn that she had taken his virginity. Mandy Milkovich flirts with Ian and tries to instigate a sexual encounter with him, but he quickly rejects her. Heartbroken, Mandy tells her brothers that Ian had raped her, and Ian and Lip are targeted by the Milkovich brothers as a result. Ian comes out to Mandy, and she calls off her brothers; she also agrees to be his "girlfriend" in order to mask his sexuality. A social security worker visits the Gallagher home looking for Aunt Ginger, the owner of the family house who has supposedly been living in a Wisconsin nursing home. The family discovers that Aunt Ginger had actually died twelve years ago, and that Frank has been secretly cashing her checks. In order to save their home, Fiona gets a senile woman from a nursing home to pose as their aunt. Fiona declines a second date with Tony, and she ventures off to visit Steve.
4	4	"Casey Casden"	Todd Holland	Teleplay by : and Television Story by: Cindy Caponera; British Episode by: Paul Abbott	January 30, 2011	2J5404	1.11
A sad and lonely Debbie steals a toddler from a birthday party. When the town goes into a frenzy over the boy's disappearance, the family concocts a plan to return the boy to his family without drawing attention from the public and the police. The plan is successful, but the kidnapping incident leaves Fiona to question how she's raising the kids. Meanwhile, Eddie unexpectedly moves back in with his family, citing financial issues. Karen, still angry with her father for leaving, rebels by trying to seduce Frank; he rebuffs her. At the Alibi Room, bartender Kevin Ball tries to get rid of a flirty girl by falsely claiming he is going to marry his girlfriend, Veronica. Frank overhears this and loudly celebrates while Veronica's mother is present. As a result, Kevin drunkenly proposes to Veronica, who happily accepts. Kevin later informs Fiona that he is already married.
5	5	"Three Boys"	Mimi Leder	Teleplay by : Alex Borstein; British Episode by: Danny Brocklehurst	February 6, 2011	2J5405	0.95
Veronica's wedding plans fall south as she discovers that Kevin is separated but still legally married to his abusive wife. When Veronica finds out that she comes with a substantial dowry, Kevin and the Gallagher clan set up a fake wedding to collect the money. Things quickly fall apart when Veronica's pyromaniac brother Marty breaks out of prison in hopes of attending the wedding. Veronica and Fiona drug Marty—temporarily knocking him out—and the wedding continues without incident. Frank is forced to schedule a biopsy for a strange third lump in his scrotum. He temporarily joins a cancer support group until his results come back negative. Kash invites Ian to his house while his wife Linda is out of town. However, Ian feels uncomfortable upon seeing images of Kash's family and decides to leave.
6	6	"Killer Carl"	John Dahl	Mike O'Malley	February 13, 2011	2J5406	1.01
Carl gets a note sent home from his teacher, who is concerned about his violent behavior. Fiona tries to prove to Carl's teachers that the Gallagher home is suitable for rehabilitating a delinquent, but the school officials threaten to call Child Protective Services if Carl does not show up with a legal guardian. Frank declines to attend Carl's meeting, but agrees to show up to Karen's school event, to Fiona's dismay. Steve attends Carl's meeting and ultimately gets him off the hook by exchanging a marijuana deal with the principal. Frank is hunted down by two ruthless thugs after he fails to follow through with an illegal money-making scheme, and must repay them $6,000. Linda begins complaining to Kash and Ian about the shoplifting in the store, and she teaches Kash and Ian how to use a gun. A professor catches Lip taking the SAT's for other students, and warns him to never do it again. But, impressed by Lip's intelligence, the professor has some educational opportunities for him.
7	7	"Frank Gallagher: Loving Husband, Devoted Father"	David Nutter	Etan Frankel	February 20, 2011	2J5407	1.14
Frank continues to be hunted down by the two thugs, who threaten to kill him if they don't receive their $6,000. The family helps Frank fake his own death to convince the thugs to leave town. Steve gets Fiona to spend the night at an expensive hotel, leaving Liam in agoraphobic Sheila's care. When Liam waddles off outside, Sheila gains enough courage to briefly go outside and save Liam, making significant progress in overcoming her agoraphobia. Linda discovers her husband's affair after installing new security cameras; Linda punches Ian and blackmails Kash into having another baby with her. Mandy's delinquent brother, Mickey Milkovich, continues to steal from Kash's store. When Mickey steals Kash's gun, Ian visits the Milkovich house to confront Mickey. The two get into a physical altercation that turns into sex.
8	8	"It's Time to Kill the Turtle"	Scott Frank	Nathan Jackson and Nancy M. Pimental	February 27, 2011	2J5408	0.92
Frank wakes up in the hospital and is offered $3,000 if he can stay sober for two weeks for a medical study. After agreeing to the deal, Frank's newfound sobriety leads him into a euphoric state, and Sheila worries that he is no longer attracted to her. Though most of the family is relieved with Frank's new behavior, Lip warns Debbie and Carl that Frank's sobriety isn't going to last, as Frank will return to drinking once he receives the money. When Frank begins doing destructive home renovations, the family agrees to sacrifice Frank's sober behavior and they force booze down his throat. Ian continues his sexual relationship with Mickey. Kevin and Veronica take in a teenage foster kid, Ethel, who originates from a polygamous sect where she was stuck in a predatory marriage with an adult man. When Lip takes a tour at the university, Karen questions their relationship; Lip agrees that they're strictly friends with benefits. Steve visits his wealthy family out of town, and it is revealed that his real name is Jimmy Lishman.
9	9	"But at Last Came a Knock"	Mark Mylod	Teleplay by : Alex Borstein; British Episode by: Paul Abbott	March 6, 2011	2J5409	1.14
Debbie stalks Steve and discovers his double life. Debbie extorts him to keep it a secret, and Steve reveals he has bought the house directly next to the Gallaghers. Lip works with Steve in order to buy concert tickets for Karen. Kevin and Veronica want to foster Ethel's baby son, Jonah. Eddie invites Karen to a purity ball, a religious reconciliation event where girls pledge their chastity. Ian and Mickey are caught having sex in the store by Kash. When Mickey later attempts to shoplift, Kash shoots him in the leg. Frank has settlement money coming his way, but he needs his ex-wife Monica's signature on the papers. Frank lures Monica into town with a fake grocery contest, and discovers that Monica has a girlfriend. Monica reunites with her kids, who are ambivalent about her return. Fiona is enraged when Monica reveals she wants to take Liam to live with her; she criticizes Monica for her absence and leaving her to fend for the family. When Monica refuses to compromise, Fiona announces: "I'm done."
10	10	"Nana Gallagher Had an Affair"	Adam Bernstein	Teleplay by : and Television Story by: Cindy Caponera; British Episode by: Paul Abbott	March 13, 2011	2J5410	1.12
Fiona moves in with Steve next door, keeping an eye on the kids while Monica tries to be their mom again. A paternity test on Liam is done, and the family finds out that Frank is Liam's biological father. Lip and Ian also take a paternity test; Lip reveals that Ian is not actually Frank's son, but the father is probably one of Frank's brothers. Monica, having done enough damage within the family, willingly returns Liam to Fiona and leaves town with her girlfriend. Frank begins getting stalked by a disability worker, who is trying to prove Frank's disability fraud. Frank schemes a plan in which he deliberately gets Carl hit by the worker's car, using Carl's injury to blackmail the worker. Ian visits Mickey in prison. Karen attends the purity ball with Eddie, in hopes of reconciling their relationship. However, Eddie angrily calls Karen a whore when she admits her extensive sexual history as required by the ball's program. Sheila kicks Eddie out of the house and overcomes her agoraphobia.
11	11	"Daddyz Girl"	Sanaa Hamri	Nancy M. Pimental	March 20, 2011	2J5411	1.10
While volunteering at Debbie's school, Fiona befriends Jasmine, an affectionate mother from Debbie's class who expresses interest in offering Fiona an accounting job. Lip and Ian meet with each of Frank's brothers to find Ian's real father, and Lip believes that Frank's affluent brother Clayton is Ian's biological father. However, Ian does not wish to stay with Clayton, as he feels content with his current life. Tony discovers Steve's car-stealing business and beats Steve up in an alley. He advises Steve to either turn himself in, or skip town without telling Fiona. Lip and Ian spend the night in jail on grand theft auto charges when Lip is caught driving one of Steve's stolen cars. Following the purity ball incident, Karen has begun to spiral out of control; she trashes Eddie's room, dyes her hair black and smashes the windows of Eddie's car. When Karen sees that Frank is dosed up on painkillers for a nail gun injury, she rapes Frank and broadcasts it on her video blog Daddyz Girl to get back at her father.
12	12	"Father Frank, Full of Grace"	Mark Mylod	John Wells	March 27, 2011	2J5412	1.16
Tony gets Lip and Ian released from jail without charges. Unaware that the brothers have already been released, Steve tries to negotiate with Tony by offering the house he bought for Fiona, which Tony accepts. Under Tony's ultimatum, Steve tries to convince Fiona to skip town with him; Lip overhears and encourages Fiona to go. Fiona is hesitant, although she admits to Veronica that she is falling in love with Steve. Ian comes out to Fiona. Lip visits a depressed Karen and the two have sex. After Lip states that he loves her, a guilt-stricken Karen breaks up with him. When Karen's video blog goes viral, Frank is hunted down by both Lip and Eddie, who believe that Frank was the instigator. Broken over past events, Eddie ties a cinderblock to his feet and kills himself by jumping into the frozen lake, while Karen apologizes to Lip and explains what really happened; they reconcile. Frank shows up outside the Gallagher house begging for Lip's forgiveness; Lip urinates on Frank from his window, and Frank takes it as his punishment. Fiona decides against leaving with Steve, and instead takes up an office job at Jasmine's workplace.

== Development and casting ==
HBO began developing an American version of Shameless after striking a deal with John Wells in January 2009. In October 2009, the project had been moved to Showtime, and it was reported that William H. Macy would star in the lead role as Frank Gallagher. Later that year, Dragonball Evolution co-stars Emmy Rossum and Justin Chatwin signed on as Fiona and Steve respectively; Allison Janney was also cast for the recurring role of Sheila. John Wells Productions filmed a pilot episode for the cable network in December 2009. Paul Abbott, whose semi-autobiographical telescript became the pilot episode for the original UK version, is credited as an executive producer on the U.S. version. In April 2010, Showtime green-lit the series with a twelve-episode order. In late August, it was announced that Janney would be leaving the show, due to her series commitment on the ABC comedy Mr. Sunshine; the role of Sheila was re-cast with Joan Cusack.

Production for the first season began mid-September, mainly being filmed in the North Lawndale community area of Chicago and Burbank, California at Warner Bros. Studios. A preview of the pilot aired on December 12, 2010, after the Season 5 finale of Dexter. The first season officially began airing on Showtime on Sunday, January 9, 2011.

== Reception ==
Review aggregator Rotten Tomatoes gives the first season a rating of 70% based on 37 reviews, with the critical consensus "Shameless is a dark, urban dramedy that overcomes its leaps of faith thanks to fantastic casting, intriguing ambiance, and shock value."

== Home media release ==
The Complete First Season
Set details			Special features
12 episodes; 595 minutes (Region 1); 940 minutes (Region 2); 925 minutes (Region 4); 3-disc set (DVD), 2-disc set (Blu-ray Disc); 1.78:1 aspect ratio; Languages: English Dolby Digital 5.1 Surround (DVD); English DTS-HD Master Audio 5.1, French and Spanish Dolby 2.0 Surround (Blu-ray Disc); Subtitles: English SDH, French and Spanish (Region 1); English, Spanish, Danish, French, Dutch, Finnish, Norwegian, Swedish, English and German for the Hearing Impaired (Regions 2 and 4)			Bringing Shameless to America – A look at the process of reworking and repurposing a successful UK television series for an American premium cable audience.; Bringing the Fun to Dysfunctional – Go behind-the-scenes of the show with key members of the cast and crew in this much-too-brief making-the-series featurette.; A Shameless Discussion About Sex – Rossum and co-stars Steve Howey, Justin Chatwin and Shanola Hampton have a candid chat about the sex in Shameless.; Audio Commentaries – Two commentaries are available: "Pilot," which features a broad overview of the series courtesy of writer/director John Wells, executive producer Andrew Stern and actress Emmy Rossum; "Frank Gallagher: Loving Husband, Devoted Father," a more episode-centric track with writer Etan Frankel, director David Nutter, and actors Cameron Monaghan and Jeremy Allen White.; Deleted Scenes – A small selection of deleted scenes of the series.; Episodes: 2, 3, 5, 8, 12, 13, 14, 16, 19; Season 2 Sneak Peek – A look into season 2 of Shameless
Release dates
United States	United Kingdom	Australia	
December 27, 2011	June 25, 2012	April 4, 2012	
