= J. Michael Muro =

American cinematographer

- Born: James Michael Muro, Jr. October 12, 1964 (age 61); Queens, New York, U.S.
- Other names: Jimmy Muro; James Muro; Jim Muro
- Occupations: Cinematographer; director; camera operator
- Years active: 1982–present

James Michael Muro, Jr. (born October 12, 1964) is an American cinematographer and director.

== Early life ==
Muro's father was the owner of Statewide Auto Parts, a now-defunct junkyard located at 1256 Grand Street, Brooklyn, New York City.

== Career ==
In 1987, Muro made his directorial debut with the horror film Street Trash, which Muro tailored the script for, including a junkyard dance sequence, to make use of a Brooklyn based wrecking yard and adjacent warehouse belonging to his father.

From 1989-1997, Muro was a Steadicam operator for James Cameron's films The Abyss, Terminator 2: Judgment Day, True Lies, and Titanic and Kevin Costner's Dances with Wolves.

In 2002, Muro was director of photography on Costner's Open Range.

Kevin is always saying, “Jimmy, go back to the script as you’re setting this shot up and make sure we’re doing classic, iconic frames.” - Muro

In 2024, Muro was director of photography on Costner's Horizon: An American Saga.

== Filmography ==
=== Cinematographer ===
Film

Year	Title	Director
2003	Open Range	Kevin Costner
2004	Crash	Paul Haggis
2005	Roll Bounce	Malcolm D. Lee
2006	Flicka	Michael Mayer
2007	Rush Hour 3	Brett Ratner
2007	The Last Mimzy	Robert Shaye
2008	Traitor	Jeffrey Nachmanoff
2009	Cirque du Freak: The Vampire's Assistant	Paul Weitz
2011	What's Your Number?	Mark Mylod
2013	Parker	Taylor Hackford
2016	The Book of Love	Bill Purple
2018	Billionaire Boys Club	James Cox
2024	Horizon: An American Saga – Chapter 1	Kevin Costner
2024	Horizon: An American Saga – Chapter 2	Kevin Costner

Television

Year	Title	Director	Notes
2007	The Black Donnellys	Paul Haggis	Episode "Pilot"
2009-2013	Southland	Christopher Chulack; Nelson McCormick; Félix Enríquez Alcalá; Himself; Allison Anders	28 episodes
2010	Detroit 1-8-7	Jeffrey Nachmanoff	Episode "Pilot"
2011	Shameless	Mark Mylod; John Wells; Stephen Hopkins	Episodes "Pilot", "Frank the Plank" and "Aunt Ginger"
2012-2017	Longmire		20 episodes
2015	The Brink		7 episodes
2017-2022	SEAL Team		47 episodes
2025	Dexter: Original Sin	Monica Raymund	Episodes "The Big Bad Body Problem" and "Business and Pleasure"

=== Director ===
Film

- Street Trash (1987)

Television

Year	Title	Episode(s)
2013	Shameless	"The Sins of My Caretaker"
2010-2013	Southland	"Maximum Deployment"
2010-2013	Southland	"Cop or Not"
2010-2013	Southland	"Failure Drill"
2010-2013	Southland	"Legacy"
2010-2013	Southland	"Risk"
2010-2013	Southland	"Babel"
2010-2013	Southland	"Heroes"
2012-2017	Longmire	"An Incredibly Beautiful Thing"
2012-2017	Longmire	"Tell It Slant"
2012-2017	Longmire	"Election Day"
2012-2017	Longmire	"Of Children and Travelers"
2012-2017	Longmire	"Harvest"
2012-2017	Longmire	"Help Wanted"
2012-2017	Longmire	"Shotgun"
2012-2017	Longmire	"Pure Peckinpah"
2012-2017	Longmire	"Continual Soiree"
2012-2017	Longmire	"Thank You, Victoria"
2012-2017	Longmire	"Opiates and Antibiotics"
2014	The Red Road	"The Wolf and the Dog"
2014	The Red Road	"The Woman Who Fell from the Sky"
2015	The Brink	"Swim, Shmuley, Swim"
2016	Rush Hour	"LA Real Estate Boom"
2017	Outsiders	"Unbroken Chain"
2017	Animal Kingdom	"Bleed for It"
2017	Power	"We're in This Together"
2018-2021	SEAL Team	"The Upside Down"
2018-2021	SEAL Team	"Never Get Out of the Boat"
2018-2021	SEAL Team	"Outside the Wire"
2018-2021	SEAL Team	"You Only Die Once"
2018-2021	SEAL Team	"Rules of Engagement"
2018-2021	SEAL Team	"Horror Has a Face"
2018-2021	SEAL Team	"Hollow at the Core"
2018-2021	SEAL Team	"Frog on the Tracks"
2018-2021	SEAL Team	"Man on Fire"

== Awards and nominations ==
Year	Award	Category	Title	Result
1987	Brussels International Fantastic Film Festival	Silver Raven	Street Trash	Won
1987	Avoriaz International Fantastic Film Festival	Fear Section Award	Street Trash	Nominated
2004	BAFTA Awards	Best Cinematography	Crash	Nominated
