= Three Boys =

- Shameless episode
- Episode no.: Season 1 Episode 5
- Directed by: Mimi Leder
- Story by: Danny Brocklehurst
- Teleplay by: Alex Borstein
- Cinematography by: Rodney Charters
- Editing by: Kelley Dixon
- Production code: 2J5405
- Original release date: February 6, 2011
- Running time: 43 minutes

Guest appearances
- Joan Cusack as Sheila Jackson; Anthony Anderson as Marty Fisher; Vanessa Bell Calloway as Carol Fisher; Jane Levy as Mandy Milkovich; Sandy Martin as Doctor; Tyler Jacob Moore as Tony Markovich; Marguerite Moreau as Linda; Joel Murray as Eddie Jackson; Pej Vahdat as Kash

Episode chronology
← Previous "Casey Casden"	Next → "Killer Carl"
- Shameless season 1

"Three Boys" is the fifth episode of the first season of the American television comedy drama Shameless, an adaptation of the British series of the same name. The episode was written by consulting producer Alex Borstein, and directed by Mimi Leder. It originally aired on Showtime on February 6, 2011.

The series is set on the South Side of Chicago, Illinois, and depicts the poor, dysfunctional family of Frank Gallagher, a neglectful single father of six: Fiona, Phillip, Ian, Debbie, Carl, and Liam. He spends his days drunk, high, or in search of money, while his children need to learn to take care of themselves. In the episode, the Gallagher's neighbors Kevin and Veronica arrange their wedding plans, while Frank believes he might have cancer.

According to Nielsen Media Research, the episode was seen by an estimated 0.95 million household viewers and gained a 0.4/1 ratings share among adults aged 18–49. The episode received mixed reviews from critics, many of whom criticized Frank's cancer subplot.

== Plot ==
While preparing for her wedding, Veronica questions why Kevin is proposing to her. Kevin finally reveals that he is separated but still legally married to his estranged abusive wife. Realizing they will not be able to get legally married, they debate over a new strategy to hold off suspicion from Veronica's mother Carol.

To help Kevin and Veronica, the Gallagher family and friends continue with the plans for the wedding: Lip, Ian, and Carl manage to entrap a pedophile priest into officiating a false ceremony; Fiona organizes an impromptu bachelorette party for Veronica; Steve takes charge of the wedding cake; and Sheila offers to make Veronica's wedding dress. However, things spiral out of control when Veronica's pyromaniac brother Marty breaks out of prison to attend the wedding. Meanwhile, Frank attends a clinic, where a doctor is surprised by Frank having three lumps in his scrotum; Frank is forced to get a biopsy as it could be a precedent for cancer. Astonished by the possible diagnosis, Frank seeks solace by joining a cancer support group.

With his wife Linda out of town, Kash decides to invite Ian over to his house to have sex. However, Ian feels uncomfortable upon seeing images of Kash's family and decides to leave. Fearing that Marty may cause trouble at the wedding, Veronica and Fiona drug him and handcuff him to the toilet. Sheila prepares to attend the wedding with Frank and Karen but is unable to leave the house, experiencing a panic attack before opening the door. The false wedding goes as planned, and Carol surprises her daughter by giving her a $500 check. Having learned that he is not diagnosed with cancer, Frank makes a toast to Veronica and Kevin. While the Gallaghers join for a family photo, Lip has sex with Karen in a bathroom stall. Next to them, Marty, having released himself, prepares to roast toilet paper.

== Production ==
=== Development ===
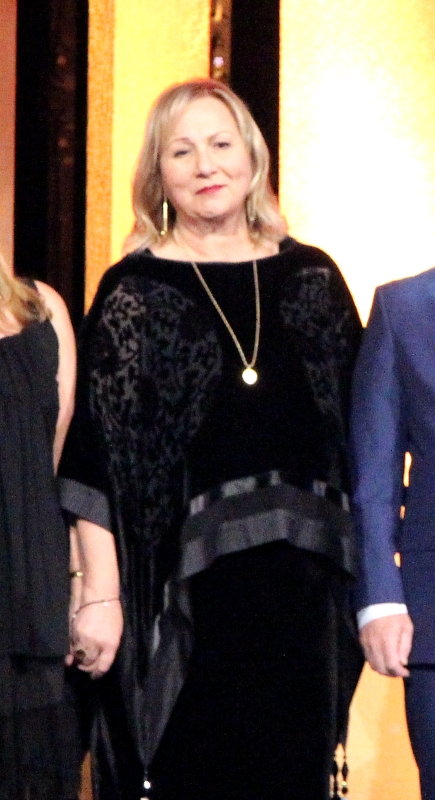
The episode was directed by Mimi Leder.

The episode was written by consulting producer Alex Borstein, and directed by Mimi Leder. It was Borstein's first writing credit, and Leder's first directing credit. The episode is a loose adaptation of the third episode of the British version.

== Reception ==
=== Viewers ===
In its original American broadcast, "Three Boys" was seen by an estimated 0.95 million household viewers with a 0.4/1 in the 18–49 demographics. This means that 0.4 percent of all households with televisions watched the episode, while 1 percent of all of those watching television at the time of the broadcast watched it. This was a 15% decrease in viewership from the previous episode, which was seen by an estimated 1.11 million household viewers with a 0.6/1 in the 18–49 demographics.

=== Critical reviews ===
"Three Boys" received mixed reviews from critics. Eric Goldman of IGN gave the episode a "good" 7.5 out of 10 and wrote, "I didn't feel this episode was quite as strong as the last couple. I've noted in the past that Shameless rides a fine line, clearly not playing things exactly realistically, yet still giving you characters to invest in. However, I felt that Frank not realizing his entire life that it was abnormal and perhaps worth investigating that he has three testicles to be pretty ridiculous – Frank is Frank, but he lives in the world and would have basic knowledge on standard anatomy." Jordan Cramer of TV Overmind, who gave the episode a "B" grade, expressed similar sentiments: "With the episode being centered on the big faux wedding, I was expecting more out of the episode than was actually shown. In the end, it was a bungee cord that was too long and a bump on the head of Frank that brought the episode down a few notches."

Joshua Alston of The A.V. Club gave the episode a "B–" grade, praising the snappy dialogue but criticizing the central storyline: "The problem with this story is that compared to the schemes we've seen before, there's not a whole lot of urgency to it. [...] The stakes were simply too low here, especially considering the rub of the whole thing—Kevin's existing marriage—was dealt with and put to bed with such little fanfare."

Tim Basham of Paste wrote, "In a series replete with colorful characters we've only had glimpses into the slightly psychotic mind of young Carl Gallagher, who, in this episode, attempts to microwave a goldfish. Shameless has more psychoses than an entire day of soap operas." Leigh Raines of TV Fanatic gave the episode a 3.5 star rating out of 5. Jacob Clifton of Television Without Pity gave the episode an "A+" grade.
