= Summertime (Shameless) =

- Shameless episode
- Episode no.: Season 2 Episode 1
- Directed by: Mark Mylod
- Written by: John Wells
- Cinematography by: Rodney Charters
- Editing by: Regis Kimble
- Production code: 2J5951
- Original release date: January 8, 2012
- Running time: 52 minutes

Guest appearances
- Joan Cusack as Sheila Jackson; James Wolk as Adam Lange; Madison Davenport as Ethel; Marcus Brown as Pub Patron; Pej Vahdat as Kash; Emma Greenwell as Mandy Milkovich; Tyler Jacob Moore as Tony Markovich; Marguerite Moreau as Linda; Jack Carter as Stan; Dennis Boutsikaris as Professor Hearst; Amy Smart as Jasmine Hollander

Episode chronology
← Previous "Father Frank, Full of Grace"	Next → "Summer Loving"
- Shameless season 2

"Summertime" is the first episode of the second season of the American television comedy drama Shameless, an adaptation of the British series of the same name. It is the 13th overall episode of the series and was written by series developer John Wells, and directed by co-executive producer Mark Mylod. It originally aired on Showtime on January 8, 2012.

The series is set on the South Side of Chicago, Illinois, and depicts the poor, dysfunctional family of Frank Gallagher, a neglectful single father of six: Fiona, Phillip, Ian, Debbie, Carl, and Liam. He spends his days drunk, high, or in search of money, while his children need to learn to take care of themselves. In the episode, Frank is forced to pay $10,000 to a man who keeps Liam as collateral, while the Gallaghers face new challenges.

According to Nielsen Media Research, the episode was seen by an estimated 1.58 million household viewers and gained a 0.8 ratings share among adults aged 18–49, which was higher than any episode of the previous season. The episode received positive reviews from critics, who praised the new storylines for the characters.

== Plot ==
During summer season, things have changed for the Gallagher family and friends. Fiona (Emmy Rossum) and Veronica (Shanola Hampton) now work as waitresses at a local club. Sheila (Joan Cusack) continues to make progress in overcoming her agoraphobia, while Karen (Laura Slade Wiggins) now attends Sex Addicts Anonymous meetings and constantly hangs out with Jody (Zach McGowan), one of her group members. Debbie (Emma Kenney) and Carl (Ethan Cutkosky) are running a summer babysitting service in the house to bring in extra funds. Lip (Jeremy Allen White) now forms part of a fight club to earn money, while also trying to get back with Karen. Tony (Tyler Jacob Moore) has now moved into the house next to the Gallaghers, performing renovations.

At the Alibi Room, Frank (William H. Macy) overhears a bar patron, Baby (Marcus Brown), claim that he survived being tasered twice without falling or urinating. Doubting his story, Frank bets $10,000 to see him replicate it. However, Baby wins the bet and immediately demands the payment. Frank uses Liam to win sympathy panhandling until Baby takes Liam as collateral. At the nightclub, Jasmine (Amy Smart) introduces Fiona to David (Casey Biggs) whom she is having an affair with. Fiona also flirts with a handsome banker, Adam (James Wolk), whom she later has sex with. Meanwhile, Ian (Cameron Monaghan) continues to work at Kash's store, although Kash (Pej Vahdat) secretly leaves his pregnant wife Linda (Marguerite Moreau) and children for another man. Ian expresses interest in attending West Point, and Lip agrees to help him with his application and grades, despite fearing that his brother might be killed in combat.

Kevin (Steve Howey), with the help of Ethel (Madison Davenport), has begun growing marijuana in the Alibi's basement, causing the building's electric bill to increase, much to the dismay of the bar's elderly owner Stan (Jack Carter). When Veronica (Shanola Hampton) discovers the marijuana, she orders Kevin to destroy it; Kevin secretly buries a small amount of the marijuana in their garden. When Frank fails to return Liam to the Gallagher house, Fiona and her siblings arrive at Baby's house to pay for Liam's release. Despite coming short, Baby accepts the payment and Fiona uses some of Kevin's marijuana to cover the rest. Fiona decides to run in the field and try to break her personal record time. The episode concludes with the entire South Side neighborhood celebrating as Kevin burns the remainder of the marijuana in the streets.

== Production ==
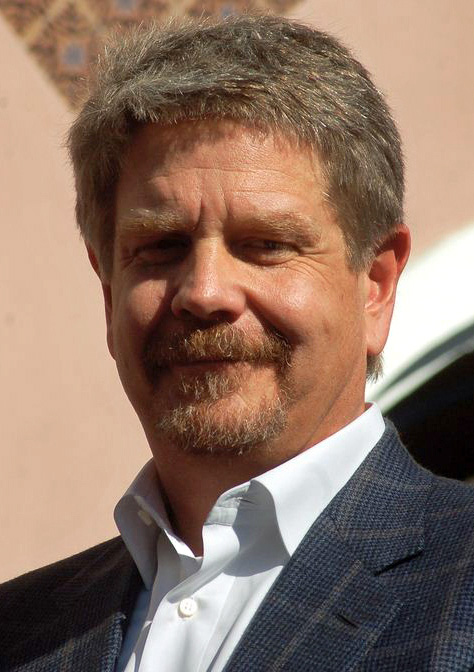
The episode was written by John Wells.

The episode was written by series developer John Wells, and directed by co-executive producer Mark Mylod. It was Wells' fourth writing credit, and Mylod's fourth directing credit.

== Reception ==
=== Viewers ===
In its original American broadcast, "Summertime" was seen by an estimated 1.58 million household viewers with a 0.8 in the 18–49 demographics. This means that 0.8 percent of all households with televisions watched the episode. This was a 36% increase in viewership from the previous episode, which was seen by an estimated 1.16 million household viewers with a 0.5/1 in the 18–49 demographics.

=== Critical reviews ===
"Summertime" received positive reviews by critics. Eric Goldman of IGN gave the episode a "great" 8 out of 10 and wrote in his verdict, "Shameless can sometimes go too far in terms of how goofy it gets – it's sometimes a bit exhausting, especially where Frank's concerned. But the Gallagher kids, especially the older ones, have enough heart to keep me invested and I was glad to have them back."

Joshua Alston of The A.V. Club gave a mixed assessment of the episode: "For the second year in a row, it seems I'll spend my season of Shameless deciding how I feel about Shameless. [...] I don't mind the show being a slice-of-life, and I don't need it to be heavily plot-driven, but I do need Shameless not to feel too leisurely, because that's a poor tonal fit for a show about a perpetually desperate family." Alston was critical of Frank's storyline, writing "I wasn't crazy about any bit of this plot, really. [...] I like the wackiness of Shameless, but it has to feel moored to something, and Frank owing money for losing a goofy bet is neither tethered to anything larger, nor a well-executed episodic plot."

Alan Sepinwall's review for HitFix was largely positive, praising the comedic and relaxed tone of the episode: "The Gallaghers are still under constant threat of financial ruin – or, worse, being split up by social services – but overall the show seems to be enjoying their hustles more, and finding more ways to have comedy spin out of the kids [...] rather than just leaning on Frank to make things funny." James Queally of NJ.com praised the new developments of the characters, and concluded "Season 2 of Shameless appears to be on track with the first 12 episodes of the series. It's going to be messy, it's going to have some scenes that are hard to swallow and it's also going to make you laugh your ass off."

Tim Basham of Paste gave the episode an 8.1 out of 10 and wrote, "There is nothing quite like Shameless on television today. Its humorous take on a motherless (and essentially fatherless) family's struggle to survive on the poor side of Chicago mixes bizarrely well with a bit of pathos and an astonishing amount of typically avoided, heavy-duty adult sexuality and drug references, especially for a show starring several adolescents and grade-schoolers. And, as numerous groundbreaking series have proven since the dawn of television, it's going to take a while for the Showtime series to gather the attention it deserves." Kevin Fitzpatrick of TV Overmind wrote, "I won't say that everything about Shameless return clicks together so perfectly, but when the perverse hilarity of the Gallagher clan reaches its most lightheartedly entertaining, few could bemoan the return of TV's most shamelessly depraved family."

Leigh Raines of TV Fanatic gave the episode a 4.5 star rating out of 5 and wrote, "All in all, I thought this was a tremendous welcome back episode for the Shameless crew." Kelsea Stahler of Hollywood.com wrote, "This episode didn't set up anything too hairy or leave us with a cliffhanger, but if Season Two is anything like Season One, we're setting in on a journey that's sure to snowball into insanity. Either that, or someone has replaced the Gallaghers with a more stable family."
