= Casey Casden =

- Shameless episode
- Episode no.: Season 1 Episode 4
- Directed by: Todd Holland
- Story by: Paul Abbott
- Teleplay by: Cindy Caponera
- Cinematography by: Rodney Charters
- Editing by: Thomas Bolger
- Production code: 2J5404
- Original release date: January 30, 2011
- Running time: 44 minutes

Guest appearances
- Joan Cusack as Sheila Jackson; Tim Bagley as Mike; Vanessa Bell Calloway as Carol Fisher; Tyler Jacob Moore as Tony Markovich; Joel Murray as Eddie Jackson

Episode chronology
← Previous "Aunt Ginger"	Next → "Three Boys"
- Shameless season 1

"Casey Casden" is the fourth episode of the first season of the American television comedy drama Shameless, an adaptation of the British series of the same name. The episode was written by producer Cindy Caponera, and directed by Todd Holland. It originally aired on Showtime on January 30, 2011.

The series is set on the South Side of Chicago, Illinois, and depicts the poor, dysfunctional family of Frank Gallagher, a neglectful single father of six: Fiona, Phillip, Ian, Debbie, Carl, and Liam. He spends his days drunk, high, or in search of money, while his children need to learn to take care of themselves. In the episode, Debbie kidnaps a toddler from the neighborhood and the Gallaghers have to find a way to return him.

According to Nielsen Media Research, the episode was seen by an estimated 1.11 million household viewers and gained a 0.6/1 ratings share among adults aged 18–49. The episode received highly positive reviews from critics, who praised its dark humor, storylines and ending.

== Plot ==
At the Jackson residence, Frank discovers that the neighbors, the Casdens, are throwing a birthday party but loses interest when he realizes there will not be alcohol. Eddie Jackson unexpectedly moves back in with his family, citing financial issues, much to the dismay of his estranged wife Sheila and their daughter Karen. Angered by her father's return, Karen tries to seduce Frank to get back at her father, but Frank rebuffs her.

Hearing a noise at the house, Fiona and Steve investigate and are shocked to find that Debbie, still saddened over having to say goodbye to the woman from the nursing home, has kidnapped the birthday party's toddler, Casey. This leads to a local search for Casey, and the Gallaghers are alarmed that they might be arrested for kidnapping him. Lip concocts a plan to return Casey to his family without drawing attention from the public and the police. He enlists Carl, Kevin and Veronica to call the police and report separate instances of a little boy walking around Chicago, and they fabricate a story in which Debbie finds Casey on the street and decides to walk him home. Lip's plan is successful, and Fiona takes Debbie to the police station with Tony to make a statement. She gets over $700 in rewards, and Steve decides to buy her a baby doll.

While working at the Alibi Room, Kevin tries to get rid of a flirty girl by falsely claiming he is going to marry Veronica. Frank overhears this and loudly celebrates while Veronica's mother Carol is present. Kevin is forced to accept the statement, although he asks Carol not to call Veronica yet. Later, he arrives home and drunkenly proposes to Veronica, which she accepts. After returning home from the police station, Fiona tells Steve that she wonders if she is properly raising her family. They are interrupted when Veronica and Kevin arrive, announcing their engagement. With her money, Debbie buys a new water heater for the house. When Fiona comments over Kevin's indifference to getting engaged, Kevin reveals to her that he is already married.

== Production ==
=== Development ===
The episode was written by producer Cindy Caponera, and directed by Todd Holland. It was Caponera's first writing credit, and Holland's first directing credit. The episode is a loose adaptation of the fourth episode of the British version.

== Reception ==
=== Viewers ===
In its original American broadcast, "Casey Casden" was seen by an estimated 1.11 million household viewers with a 0.6/1 in the 18–49 demographics. This means that 0.6 percent of all households with televisions watched the episode, while 1 percent of all of those watching television at the time of the broadcast watched it. This was a 23% increase in viewership from the previous episode, which was seen by an estimated 0.90 million household viewers with a 0.4/1 in the 18–49 demographics.

=== Critical reviews ===
"Casey Casden" received highly positive reviews from critics. Eric Goldman of IGN gave the episode a "great" 8.5 out of 10 and wrote, "It was another strong episode for this series, which I continue to find entertaining week after week. I mentioned in my last review how I really liked the odd bond Debbie formed with the fake "Aunt Ginger," which made me glad to see that not dropped this week as it was Debbie's upset feelings over that loss (on top of her usual screwed up family life) that set the plotline into motion." Goldman also spoke highly of the episode's cinematography, positively comparing the Gallagher's plan to return the baby to "a big heist movie scenario, with everyone playing a part and working out exactly where what would occur."

Joshua Alston of The A.V. Club, who had a mixed assessment of the previous episodes, gave "Casey Casden" an "A–" grade, writing "Tonight's Shameless was a pivotal episode for me. Four episodes is a reasonable number of viewings to give a show that managed to pique your curiosity and squeeze a few laughs out of you. But I still wasn't quite sure what to make of Shameless following "Aunt Ginger," and if I hadn't connected with this episode, I'd obviously still watch, but my heart probably wouldn't have been in it. But "Casey Casden" is an episode of Shameless that makes sense to me."

Alan Sepinwall of HitFix was slightly critical of the episode's central storyline, writing "an episode like this one doesn't make me look at [the Gallaghers] as amusingly eccentric, but damaged and capable of inflicting great harm on others." In contrast, Tim Basham of Paste wrote of the kidnapping plot: "We're learning that the family really isn't as bad as they appear. It's just that they have to break a number of laws in order to survive and stay together." Alexandra Peers of Vulture commented highly on the fleshing out of Kevin and Veronica's characters: "So far, the neighbor couple has pretty much been used for sex scenes, running gags, and bum shots at the corners of the drama, but things are about to get more interesting." Leigh Raines of TV Fanatic gave the episode a 4 star rating out of 5. Jacob Clifton of Television Without Pity gave the episode an "A+" grade, writing "The confident, smart tone [of the episode] continues from last week."
