= Father Frank, Full of Grace (Shameless season 1) =

- Shameless episode
- Episode no.: Season 1 Episode 12
- Directed by: Mark Mylod
- Written by: John Wells
- Cinematography by: Rodney Charters
- Editing by: Julie Monroe
- Production code: 2J5412
- Original release date: March 27, 2011
- Running time: 50 minutes

Guest appearances
- Joan Cusack as Sheila Jackson; Madison Davenport as Ethel; Julia Duffy as Candace Lishman; Russell Hornsby as Tony's Partner; Toby Huss as Steve's Boss; Tyler Jacob Moore as Tony Markovich; Joel Murray as Eddie Jackson; Jeremy Ratchford as Detective Bernero; Amy Smart as Jasmine Hollander

Episode chronology
| ← Previous "Daddyz Girl" | Next → "Summertime" |
- Shameless season 1

"Father Frank, Full of Grace" is the twelfth episode and first season finale of the American television comedy drama Shameless, an adaptation of the British series of the same name. Written by series developer John Wells, and directed by co-executive producer Mark Mylod, it originally aired in the United States on Showtime on March 27, 2011.

The series is set on the South Side of Chicago, Illinois, and depicts the poor, dysfunctional Gallagher family, including patriarch Frank, a neglectful single father of six: Fiona, Phillip, Ian, Debbie, Carl, and Liam. He often spends his days under the influence of drugs and alcohol, while his children need to learn to take care of themselves. In the episode, Fiona considers her future with Steve, while Frank faces consequences after Karen uploads their video.

According to Nielsen Media Research, the episode was seen by an estimated 1.16 million household viewers and gained a 0.5/1 ratings share among adults aged 18–49. The episode received positive reviews from critics, who praised the closure to the storylines and performances from the cast.

== Plot ==
Fiona, Debbie and Jasmine are at the police station, awaiting for news about Lip and Ian. Tony tells Fiona that unless Lip and Ian reveal who actually stole the car, they could face five years in prison. Tony bribes his superior with tickets for the Chicago Bears to get Lip and Ian released. At home, Ian finally comes out to Fiona; she shows her acceptance and states she already knew.

Still believing that Lip and Ian are in custody, Steve meets with Tony to offer a deal for their release; he will leave town and give him the house he bought for Fiona. Not revealing they already left, Tony accepts. Lip visits a depressed Karen and the two have sex. After Lip states that he loves her, a guilt-stricken Karen breaks up with him. Devastated, Lip returns home and confides to Ian, while Karen uploads the video of her and Frank to her website; she sends the video to all her contacts, including Eddie. After viewing the video at work, Eddie chases after Frank, who is forced to go into hiding. Steve visits Fiona, explaining that he was responsible for the stolen car, and offers her a chance to leave with him for Costa Rica. After he leaves, Lip tells Fiona that she should accept it, feeling she deserves a better life.

The following day, Fiona contemplates Steve's offer; Fiona is reluctant, but admits to Veronica that she may be falling in love with Steve. After being informed by a classmate, Lip discovers the video of Karen and brutally attacks Frank in the street. A hurt Frank returns with Sheila, where he thanks her for not giving up on him. Meanwhile, Eddie discovers that his co-workers have all watched the video of Karen. Depressed and humiliated, Eddie heads to his ice fishing hut, where he commits suicide by tying himself to a cinder block and jumping into the water. Karen apologizes to Lip and explains what really happened; they reconcile, bonding over their strained relationships with their respective fathers. Later that night, Frank shows up outside the Gallagher house begging for Lip's forgiveness; Lip urinates on Frank from his window, and Frank takes it as his punishment. Steve waits at the airport, but Fiona does not arrive, forcing him to leave alone. The episode concludes with Fiona visiting Jasmine's workplace, where she obtains an office job to further care for her family.

== Production ==
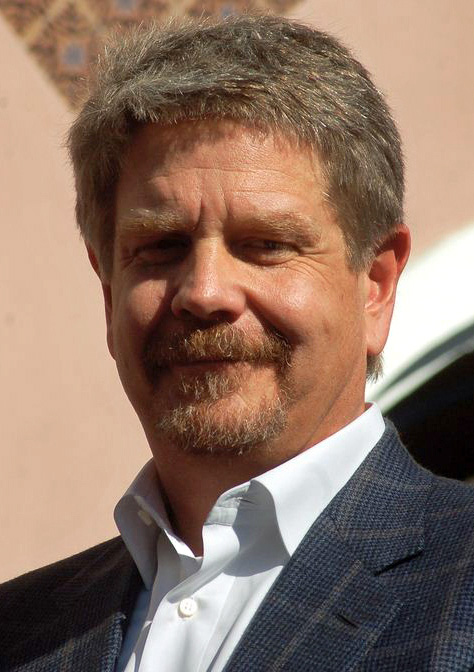
The episode was written by John Wells.

The episode was written by series developer John Wells, and directed by co-executive producer Mark Mylod. It was Wells' third writing credit, and Mylod's third directing credit.

== Reception ==
=== Viewers ===
In its original American broadcast, "Father Frank, Full of Grace" was seen by an estimated 1.16 million household viewers with a 0.5/1 in the 18–49 demographics. This means that 0.5 percent of all households with televisions watched the episode, while 1 percent of all of those watching television at the time of the broadcast watched it. This was a 5% increase in viewership from the previous episode, which was seen by an estimated 1.10 million household viewers with a 0.5/1 in the 18–49 demographics.

=== Critical reviews ===
"Father Frank, Full of Grace" received positive reviews by critics. Eric Goldman of IGN gave the episode a "great" 8.5 out of 10. Goldman expressed praise over the episode's balance between comedy and drama, though he was mixed over Fiona entertaining the idea of leaving with Steve: "I simply never believed it was a real possibility for her. [...] It just didn't seem like something Fiona could go through with." Goldman was polarized over the character of Jasmine, stating "I'm still not sure what to make of Amy Smart's character. She constantly seems to be coming on to Fiona and it sounded pretty evocative when she said Fiona should come work for her husband – only for it to appear to be a simple accounting firm." Alexandra Peers of Vulture expressed similar sentiments regarding Jasmine, writing of the ending "Fiona leaves the El station and goes to Jasmine's office, who's been hanging around the whole episode with a smiley blonde hunger that's sinister, where she's hired her for a job. It's not quite a cliffhanger, but there's got to be more to Jasmine than meets the eye."

Tim Basham of Paste was very positive in his review, praising the performances, particularly Laura Slade Wiggins' portrayal of Karen. He concluded "the cohesiveness of the Gallagher bunch is to be respected, especially considering some of the powerful social issues they regularly deal with [...] [It] is amazingly easy to care for the characters and become emotionally invested in the family's experiences." Alan Sepinwall of HitFix wrote, "Based on the way Showtime series generally work out, I'm not holding my breath for a significant change in direction. But as of now, the parts of Shameless that work for me work so well that I can live with the parts that don't." Leigh Raines of TV Fanatic gave the episode a 4 star rating out of 5 and praised the development of Karen's character, writing of Lip and Karen's break-up: "I was moved by Karen's tears because it was such a raw moment where you saw just how much this girl was emotionally damaged." Jacob Clifton of Television Without Pity gave the episode an "A+" grade.

Some critics were mixed over the episode. Joshua Alston of The A.V. Club gave a mixed review, giving the episode a "B–" grade. Alston disliked the conclusion of the Frank and Karen storyline, writing "[It] shook out in a way that was abrupt, dissatisfying, and too tidy all at once." He further concluded "The first season of Shameless is one that I suspect will especially benefit from watching in as few sittings as possible. [...] I'm still impressed by the season as a whole, but this finale left me feeling a little cold." Myles McNutt of Cultural Learnings was negative in his review, believing the overarching storylines were resolved too neatly: "[The finale] does all of the writing away immediately, returning to the status quo by smoothing over some pretty substantial story developments without much fanfare." McNutt particularly criticized the handling of Lip and Karen's storyline: "For a show that claims to be shameless, to find the show pulling back from complex storylines in favor of Lip and Karen sitting on top of a building allowing the night's sky to resolve their differences is just tremendously disappointing."
