= But at Last Came a Knock =

- Shameless episode
- Episode no.: Season 1 Episode 9
- Directed by: Mark Mylod
- Story by: Paul Abbott
- Teleplay by: Alex Borstein
- Cinematography by: Rodney Charters
- Editing by: Thomas Bolger; Julie Monroe
- Production code: 2J5409
- Original release date: March 6, 2011
- Running time: 50 minutes

Guest appearances
- Joan Cusack as Sheila Jackson; Alex Borstein as Lou Deckner; Madison Davenport as Ethel; Julia Duffy as Candace Lishman; Noel Fisher as Mickey Milkovich; Joel Murray as Eddie Jackson; Pej Vahdat as Kash; Chloe Webb as Monica Gallagher; Carlease Burke as Roberta; Chris Burns as Andrea Johnson; Zayne Emory as Simon

Episode chronology
← Previous "It's Time to Kill the Turtle"	Next → "Nana Gallagher Had an Affair"
- Shameless season 1

"But at Last Came a Knock" is the ninth episode of the first season of the American television comedy drama Shameless, an adaptation of the British series of the same name. The episode was directed by co-executive producer Mark Mylod, and written by consulting producer Alex Borstein, based on a story by Paul Abbott. It originally aired in the United States on Showtime on March 6, 2011.

The series is set on the South Side of Chicago, Illinois, and depicts the poor, dysfunctional Gallagher family, including patriarch Frank, a neglectful single father of six: Fiona, Phillip, Ian, Debbie, Carl, and Liam. He often spends his days under the influence of drugs and alcohol, while his children learn to care for themselves. In the episode, Debbie stalks Steve to find out more about his personal life, while Frank tries to get his ex-wife Monica to sign papers so he can get settlement money.

According to Nielsen Media Research, the episode was seen by an estimated 1.14 million household viewers and gained a 0.5/1 ratings share among adults aged 18–49. The episode received critical acclaim, with critics praising the performances (particularly Emmy Rossum), writing and dramatic elements.

== Plot ==
Suspicious of Steve, Debbie has Veronica follow him to his house in Lake Forest. The next day, Debbie decides to visit Steve's house, meeting his mother Candace. Steve arrives and is surprised by Debbie's presence, with his mother revealing his name to be Jimmy. Steve convinces Debbie in not telling Fiona, and she blackmails him into buying her a few things. To open his new honest life, Steve reveals that he bought the house next door to the Gallaghers, planning to renovate it so he and Fiona can live in it, and asks her to keep it a secret. Meanwhile, Kevin and Veronica express interest in fostering Ethel's baby son, Jonah. Lip begins working with Steve in stealing cars for concert tickets for him and Karen. Karen is continuously pestered by her father Eddie, who wants her to attend a purity ball, a religious reconciliation event where girls pledge their chastity; Karen agrees to do so in exchange for a car.

Frank has settlement money coming his way, but he needs his ex-wife Monica's signature on the papers. Frank gets Sheila to lure Monica by calling her for a fake grocery contest. Driven by Kevin, Frank sees Monica arriving in a truck, but is surprised when he realizes that she is now in a relationship with a woman, Roberta. Monica catches Frank in the parking lot; realizing it was a set-up, Monica and Roberta chase them through town until they arrive at Sheila's house. Debbie sees her mother and walks away, ignoring her. She tearfully informs her siblings, and also reveals that Steve bought Fiona the house next door. Distraught by the news, Ian visits Mickey for consolation. Ian and Mickey have sex at Kash's store, but are caught by Kash. Mickey flees, while an embarrassed Ian continues working; moments later, Mickey returns and steals a chocolate bar, taunting Kash. Reaching his breaking point, Kash shoots Mickey in the leg, horrifying Ian.

The Gallagher siblings gather at Sheila's house to talk with Monica, who continues arguing with Frank over his scheme. Roberta finally reveals that she and Monica plan to take Liam with them, offering to sign the papers, which Frank agrees to. Fiona angrily scolds Monica for her abandonment of the family, reiterating that her children were successful in spite of her. Monica apologizes, explaining that while she failed Fiona, Lip and Ian, she can still be a mother for Debbie, Carl and Liam. When she asks Debbie and Carl to give her a chance, they hug her. Dejected, Fiona proclaims she is "done" with taking care of her family and storms out of the house. While walking, she is picked up and consoled by Steve.

== Production ==
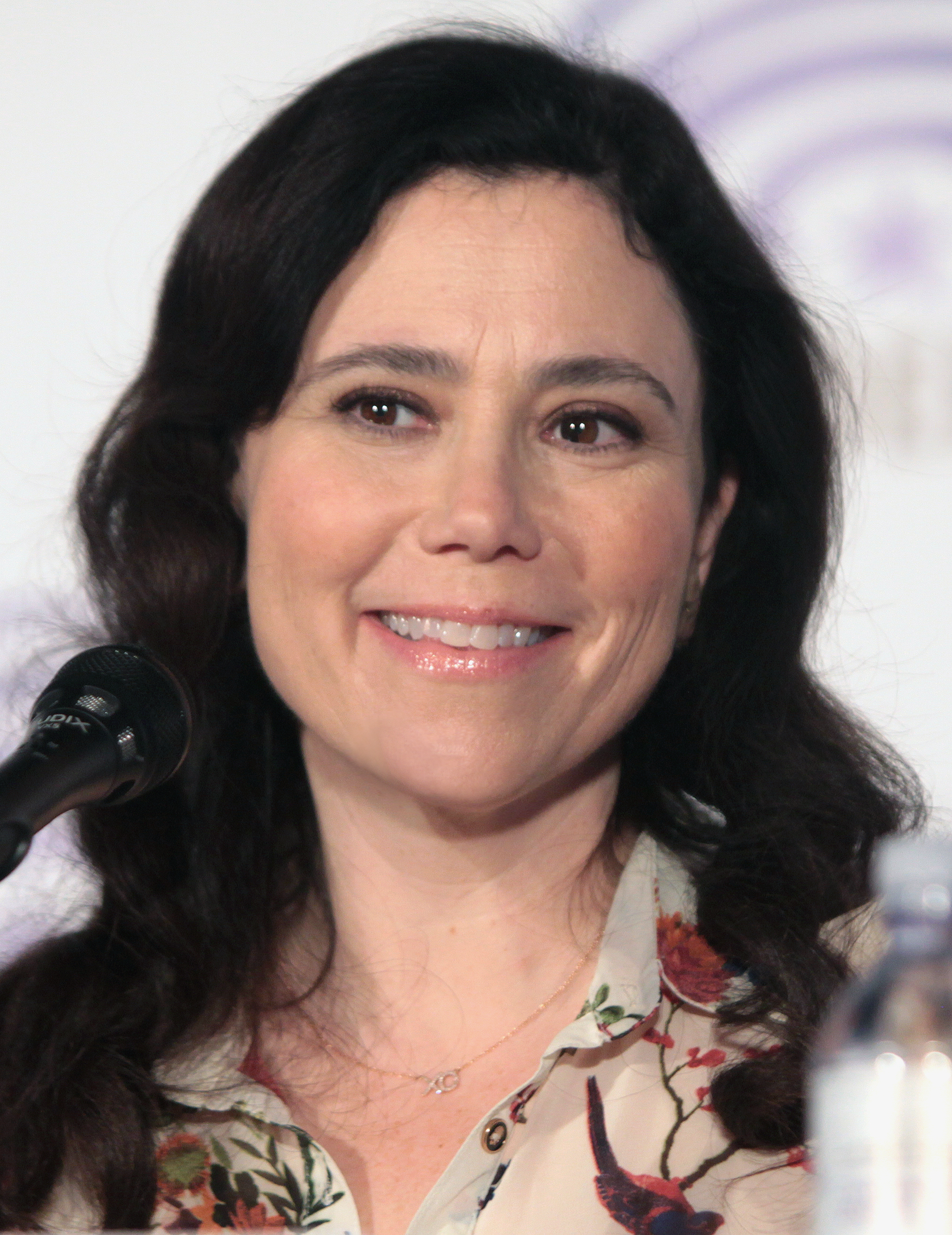
The episode was written by Alex Borstein.

The episode was written by consulting producer Alex Borstein, and directed by co-executive producer Mark Mylod. It was Borstein's second writing credit, and Mylod's second directing credit. The episode is inspired by the sixth episode of the British version.

== Reception ==
=== Viewers ===
In its original American broadcast, "But at Last Came a Knock" was seen by an estimated 1.14 million household viewers with a 0.5/1 in the 18–49 demographics. This means that 0.5 percent of all households with televisions watched the episode, while 1 percent of all of those watching television at the time of the broadcast watched it. This was a 23% increase in viewership from the previous episode, which was seen by an estimated 0.92 million household viewers with a 0.4/1 in the 18–49 demographics.

=== Critical reviews ===
"But at Last Came a Knock" received critical acclaim. Joshua Alston of The A.V. Club gave the episode an "A–" grade, praising the episode's dramatic elements: "Having Monica back in the picture led to some brilliant, explosive scenes as we saw all the characters recalibrate as best they could. [...] All of the scenes that dealt with Monica's return, from Debbie's rejection, to the rest of the family's shock, to Fiona's confrontation, went to stark, serious emotional places we haven't seen in the show." Alston also expressed praise at Rossum's performance, writing "Emmy Rossum, who was largely absent in this episode, made up for in quality what she lacked in quantity. Her showdown with Monica was fantastic."

Alan Sepinwall of HitFix expressed praise at Rossum's performance and the central storyline, writing "For the most part, this season has been at its strongest in the episodes and scenes that acknowledge the darkness of the Gallaghers' lives, which is part of why "But at Last Came a Knock" worked so well for me. Yes, Frank tries to run a lame scam to get estranged wife Monica to sign the legal paperwork, but the meat of the episode is in seeing the kids react to their mother's brief, unapologetic return."

Tim Basham of Paste considered "But At Last Came a Knock" to be "the best episode of Showtime's new series." Alexandra Peers of Vulture wrote, "of all the unpleasant developments that pile upon the Gallaghers and their friends this week, none is sadder, more true, or disturbing as when Lip announces, with dismay, that of their two parents "Dad is the good one." The show has jumped queasily between comedy and desperation since the beginning, but swings very much toward the latter by the end of this episode."

Leigh Raines of TV Fanatic gave the episode a perfect 5 star rating out of 5, expressing praise at the introduction of Monica, as well as Rossum's performance. She wrote "I've enjoyed the weekly adventures just fine, but tonight was a GAME CHANGER. This show has officially taken it up a notch and I'm feeling it big time. In particular, Emmy Rossum's performance blew me away." Jacob Clifton of Television Without Pity gave the episode an "A+" grade, describing the scene between Fiona and Monica as "heartbreaking" and "cathartic."
