= It's Time to Kill the Turtle =

- Shameless episode
- Episode no.: Season 1 Episode 8
- Directed by: Scott Frank
- Written by: Nathan Jackson; Nancy M. Pimental
- Cinematography by: Rodney Charters
- Editing by: Regis Kimble
- Production code: 2J5408
- Original release date: February 27, 2011
- Running time: 46 minutes

Guest appearances
- Joan Cusack as Sheila Jackson; Dennis Boutsikaris as Professor Hearst; Madison Davenport as Ethel; Noel Fisher as Mickey Milkovich; Christopher Gartin as Chip Lishman; Jane Levy as Amanda Milkovich; Pej Vahdat as Kash; Paige Lindsey White as Dr. Seery

Episode chronology
| ← Previous "Frank Gallagher: Loving Husband, Devoted Father" | Next → "But at Last Came a Knock" |
- Shameless season 1

"It's Time to Kill the Turtle" is the eighth episode of the first season of the American television comedy drama Shameless, an adaptation of the British series of the same name. The episode was written by Nathan Jackson and producer Nancy M. Pimental, and directed by Scott Frank. It originally aired on Showtime on February 27, 2011.

The series is set on the South Side of Chicago, Illinois, and depicts the poor, dysfunctional family of Frank Gallagher, a neglectful single father of six: Fiona, Phillip, Ian, Debbie, Carl, and Liam. He spends his days drunk, high, or in search of money, while his children need to learn to take care of themselves. In the episode, Frank decides to stay sober to win $3,000, while Kevin and Veronica take in a foster kid.

According to Nielsen Media Research, the episode was seen by an estimated 0.92 million household viewers and gained a 0.4/1 ratings share among adults aged 18–49. The episode received positive reviews from critics, who praised the performances, themes and character development.

== Plot ==
Frank falls unconscious on the street while drinking. He wakes up two days later at the hospital, where the doctors are amazed by his alcohol levels. They offer him $3,000 if he can stay sober for two weeks, which Frank accepts. For this, Frank gets an ankle monitor that will detect any alcohol in his system.

Wanting to prove themselves as ideal parental figures, Kevin and Veronica take in a teenage foster kid, Ethel, who originates from a polygamous sect where she was stuck in a predatory marriage with an adult man. Ethel wants to act as a servant to Kevin and Veronica, insisting on doing chores around the house. Veronica is initially cold towards Ethel, having only agreed to foster to receive money from the state, but she grows more sympathetic upon learning of Ethel's hardships. Lip is given a tour by Professor Hearst at the university, although this prompts Karen to question her relationship with him; Lip states they are solely friends with benefits. Ian continues having sex with Mickey, though he does not tell Kash nor Mandy.

Frank tries to find ways to distract himself to avoid alcohol. He tries to hang out with Sheila, but grows bored, leading Sheila to believe he does not find her attractive. Encountering Debbie, Frank starts eating candies, leading him into a euphoric state. This also causes him to hang out more often in the house, and helping Fiona in taking care of Debbie and Carl. Fiona is in the process of finding a new job, and after failing to complete a Microsoft Office course, is forced to work at a bar where she is sexually harassed by the customers. Fiona also grows suspicious of Steve after he receives a text from a woman named Candace; Steve insists that Candace is a colleague. Later, Steve visits his wealthy family in Lake Forest, and it is revealed that his real name is Jimmy Lishman.

When Frank takes the kids to bowling, Lip warns Debbie and Carl that Frank's sobriety isn't going to last, as Frank will return to drinking once he receives the money. He later confides in Fiona that Frank previously applied the same strategy to him years earlier for a bet, and that it hurt him because he thought he would have a good father for once. When Frank demolishes a wall for renovations, Fiona and Lip decide that they must stop him, and Debbie offers to help. They taser Frank and force booze down his throat, alerting the doctors and losing him the money. By the next day, the family has returned to their status quo in the house. Frank returns to Sheila's house, much to her delight.

== Production ==
The episode was written by Nathan Jackson and producer Nancy M. Pimental, and directed by Scott Frank. It was Jackson's first writing credit, Pimental's second writing credit, and Frank's first directing credit.

== Reception ==
=== Viewers ===
In its original American broadcast, "It's Time to Kill the Turtle" was seen by an estimated 0.92 million household viewers with a 0.4/1 in the 18–49 demographics. This means that 0.4 percent of all households with televisions watched the episode, while 1 percent of all of those watching television at the time of the broadcast watched it. This was a 20% decrease in viewership from the previous episode, which was seen by an estimated 1.14 million household viewers with a 0.5/1 in the 18–49 demographics.

=== Critical reviews ===
"It's Time to Kill the Turtle" received positive reviews from critics. Joshua Alston of The A.V. Club gave the episode a "B" grade and wrote, "Tonight's episode of Shameless is the type of episode I expected to see much earlier in its run, something quieter, a more meditative slice-of-life in which we learned more about the characters' emotional motivations. And even though "It's Time to Kill the Turtle" was enjoyable, it felt like an abrupt downshift after so many consecutive weeks of getting-the-gang-back-together capers."

Alexandra Peers of Vulture wrote, "Frank Gallagher does the cruelest thing yet to his family: He gives them hope. Frank, at least temporarily, quits drinking and becomes something of an ideal dad. He makes Mickey Mouse–shaped pancakes for the kids, pours the orange juice, even takes everybody bowling. Lip is skeptical at the transformation; Fiona is astonished; Shelia's frightened: Will a sober Frank crave her peculiar brand of crazy? But the little kids, sadly, are thrilled beyond belief." Tim Basham of Paste wrote, "Every scene with William Macy is a pleasure. In playing Frank, the actor must feel like a baby in a candy store, his opportunities for emoting are so boundless. He is a shoe-in for an Emmy nomination."

Leigh Raines of TV Fanatic gave the episode a 3 star rating out of 5 and wrote, "It looks like my previous complaints about lack of backstory will finally get touched upon next week. Looking forward to more from Steve's family and the Gallagher's mother." Jacob Clifton of Television Without Pity gave the episode an "A+" grade.
