= Daddyz Girl =

- Shameless episode
- Episode no.: Season 1 Episode 11
- Directed by: Sanaa Hamri
- Written by: Nancy M. Pimental
- Cinematography by: Rodney Charters
- Editing by: Regis Kimble
- Production code: 2J5411
- Original release date: March 20, 2011
- Running time: 45 minutes

Guest appearances
- Louise Fletcher as Peggy Gallagher; Lindsey Ginter as Charlie; Brad William Henke as Hal Hollander; Russell Hornsby as Tony's Partner; Leonard Earl Howze as Frank's Co-Worker; John Kapelos as Larry Burke; Tyler Jacob Moore as Tony Markovich; Joel Murray as Eddie Jackson; Valente Rodriguez as OSHA Officer; Angelo Tiffe as Gary; Kristoffer Winters as Clayton Gallagher; Charlene Amoia as Audrey; Morgan Walsh as Eve; Amy Smart as Jasmine Hollander

Episode chronology
← Previous "Nana Gallagher Had an Affair"	Next → "Father Frank, Full of Grace"
- Shameless season 1

"Daddyz Girl" is the eleventh episode of the first season of the American television comedy drama Shameless, an adaptation of the British series of the same name. The episode was written by producer Nancy M. Pimental, and directed by Sanaa Hamri. It originally aired on Showtime on March 20, 2011.

The series is set on the South Side of Chicago, Illinois, and depicts the poor, dysfunctional family of Frank Gallagher, a neglectful single father of six: Fiona, Phillip, Ian, Debbie, Carl, and Liam. He spends his days drunk, high, or in search of money, while his children need to learn to take care of themselves. In the episode, Fiona meets a new friend, while Lip and Ian look for the latter's father.

According to Nielsen Media Research, the episode was seen by an estimated 1.10 million household viewers and gained a 0.5/1 ratings share among adults aged 18–49. The episode received generally positive reviews from critics, although the different subplots attracted mixed reactions.

== Plot ==
Fiona attends Debbie's school to help with some preparations. The other mothers are not fond of Fiona's personality, but she catches the attention of Jasmine, who invites Fiona to go out for drinks; Fiona accepts, though she is bemused by Jasmine's affectionate behavior. Reeling from the purity ball incident, Karen has begun to spiral out of control; she trashes Eddie's room, dyes her hair black and smashes the windows of Eddie's car.

Frank is horrified to discover that he has lost his worker's comp benefits, forcing him to find a new job. He eventually finds a position for a construction site, and successfully injures himself by nailing his hand to a wooden board with a nail gun. Lip and Ian begin looking for Ian's biological father, and they visit Frank's mother Peggy in prison to learn more about their uncles. One of them, Jerry, refuses to let them in when he learns they are Frank's children. They meet with another, Clayton, who is a very kind person despite his wife refusing to acknowledge Ian as his son. To Lip's surprise, however, Ian decides not to stay with Clayton, as he feels content with his current life.

Steve tries to steal a car, only to be caught and arrested by Tony. After being taunted in the car, Tony takes Steve to an alley, where he brutally beats him. Steve continues taunting him, as he knows he cannot arrest him as it will tarnish his friendship with Fiona. So Tony offers a deal: Steve can surrender himself to authorities, or he can be allowed to leave but he must abandon the Gallaghers. Driving home, Tony calls authorities when he sees a stolen car, believing it to be Steve. However, he is shocked to discover they are Ian and Lip, and both are arrested. Frank arrives at Sheila's house, having managed to obtain Oxy for his nail gun injury. Hearing Karen crying, he goes to check in on her. Realizing that Frank is inebriated, Karen takes the Oxy and proceeds to rape Frank, recording it on her video blog Daddyz Girl to get back at her father.

== Production ==
The episode was written by producer Nancy M. Pimental, and directed by Sanaa Hamri. It was Pimental's third writing credit, and Hamri's first directing credit.

== Reception ==
=== Viewers ===
In its original American broadcast, "Daddyz Girl" was seen by an estimated 1.10 million household viewers with a 0.5/1 in the 18–49 demographics. This means that 0.5 percent of all households with televisions watched the episode, while 1 percent of all of those watching television at the time of the broadcast watched it. This was a slight decrease in viewership from the previous episode, which was seen by an estimated 1.12 million household viewers with a 0.5/1 in the 18–49 demographics.

=== Critical reviews ===
Joshua Alston of The A.V. Club was largely mixed in his review, mainly criticizing the decision to introduce new storylines in the penultimate episode: "I was left with the lingering question of why I'm seeing these story elements now. It just feels like an odd and incomplete coda following last week's episode." Commenting on Jasmine's character, Alston enjoyed the chemistry between Emmy Rossum and Amy Smart but questioned, "[Is] this the time to introduce a new character like this, one who clearly isn't dropping in for a single episode?" He ultimately gave the episode a "B-" grade.

Leigh Raines of TV Fanatic gave the episode a 3 star rating out of 5, describing the episode as "truly emotional." Raines particularly praised the guest stars, welcoming the introduction of Jasmine, calling Amy Smart's appearance a "welcome breath of fresh air"; she also described Grammy Gallagher's appearance as "phenomenal". Raines concluded that "Shameless never fails to round out the cast with a few interesting guest stars." Tim Basham of Paste wrote, "We don't really learn what happens to Steve, but with Debbie giving Steve one night to tell Fiona about his secret life, next week's season-ending episode will hopefully answer that and a few more questions." Commenting on Karen's storyline in the episode, Alexandra Peers of Vulture wrote "her entire freak-out [seemed] a bit on the nose." Jacob Clifton of Television Without Pity gave the episode an "A+" grade; Clifton commented positively on Karen's storyline, but was mixed over Ian and Lip tracking down Frank's brothers, writing "while it's the backbone and most interesting thread this week, it also seems a bit rushed and silly."
