= Nana Gallagher Had an Affair =

- Shameless episode
- Episode no.: Season 1 Episode 10
- Directed by: Adam Bernstein
- Story by: Paul Abbott
- Teleplay by: Cindy Caponera
- Cinematography by: Rodney Charters
- Editing by: Kelley Dixon; Sam Bollinger
- Production code: 2J5410
- Original release date: March 13, 2011
- Running time: 48 minutes

Guest appearances
- Joan Cusack as Sheila Jackson; Noel Fisher as Mickey Milkovich; Mo Gaffney as Christine Dowling; Jane Levy as Mandy Milkovich; Tyler Jacob Moore as Tony Markovich; Joel Murray as Eddie Jackson; Chloe Webb as Monica Gallagher; Carlease Burke as Roberta; Jerry Lambert as Randy Kulovitz

Episode chronology
← Previous "But at Last Came a Knock"	Next → "Daddyz Girl"
- Shameless season 1

"Nana Gallagher Had an Affair" is the tenth episode of the first season of the American television comedy drama Shameless, an adaptation of the British series of the same name. The episode was written by producer Cindy Caponera, and directed by Adam Bernstein. It originally aired on Showtime on March 13, 2011.

The series is set on the South Side of Chicago, Illinois, and depicts the poor, dysfunctional family of Frank Gallagher, a neglectful single father of six: Fiona, Phillip, Ian, Debbie, Carl, and Liam. He spends his days drunk, high, or in search of money, while his children need to learn to take care of themselves. In the episode, Monica tries to get back with her family, while Ian and Lip take a paternity test.

According to Nielsen Media Research, the episode was seen by an estimated 1.12 million household viewers and gained a 0.5/1 ratings share among adults aged 18–49. The episode received highly positive reviews from critics, who praised the performances and closure to Monica's arc.

== Plot ==
With Monica now taking care of the family, Fiona moves in with Steve next door. Despite Steve asking her to not think of her siblings, Fiona regularly checks on them. Monica is struggling to keep up with the daily needs of her family, and Roberta makes it clear she will not take care of six children.

Frank is still waiting for Monica to sign the papers to get the settlement money, but she wants the sole custody of Liam. During this, he is harassed by a man, Jasper, a disability worker who is trying to prove Frank's disability fraud. To get rid of him, Frank makes a scheme wherein Jasper hits Carl with his car, forcing him to stop his pursuit of Frank. Monica and Roberta get a paternity test to favor their case, but are shocked when the test reveals that Liam is Frank's son. As they leave, Lip and Ian enter the clinic to get a new paternity test.

Eddie takes Karen to the purity ball, promising to buy her a new car. When the host invites Karen to open up about her past, Karen relates her extensive sexual history. An angry Eddie scolds her, calling her a whore in front of everyone. A furious Karen returns home and destroys his basement, crying to Sheila over Eddie's lack of affection. Monica informs Frank that she will sign the papers if he gives up Liam's parent rights, which he strongly considers. Fiona and her siblings criticize Frank's actions; Lip slaps him and Fiona threatens to cut contact with him if he gives up Liam. Ian visits Mickey, who has been staying in prison. Mickey does not want his homosexuality disclosed, and prefers to be behind bars.

The Gallaghers meet for dinner, where Frank and Monica get into another argument over their planned divorce. Lip arrives with the paternity tests and is surprised by the results; while Lip is Frank's son, Ian is actually the son of one of Frank's brothers. Fiona makes it clear the family does not like Monica, and states that if Monica truly loves her children, she will leave Liam with his siblings. Angered over Eddie's actions, Sheila furiously follows Eddie out of the house, overcoming her agoraphobia in the process. Frank notes that she has left her house, and she enthusiastically celebrates. Monica and Roberta prepare to leave the city, but Monica decides to leave Liam with Fiona. As she leaves crying, Fiona nods in approval.

== Production ==
The episode was written by producer Cindy Caponera, and directed by Adam Bernstein. It was Caponera's second writing credit, and Berstein's first directing credit.

== Reception ==
=== Viewers ===
In its original American broadcast, "Nana Gallagher Had an Affair" was seen by an estimated 1.12 million household viewers with a 0.5/1 in the 18–49 demographics. This means that 0.5 percent of all households with televisions watched the episode, while 1 percent of all of those watching television at the time of the broadcast watched it. This was a slight decrease in viewership from the previous episode, which was seen by an estimated 1.14 million household viewers with a 0.5/1 in the 18–49 demographics.

=== Critical reviews ===
"Nana Gallagher Had an Affair" received highly positive reviews by critics. Joshua Alston of The A.V. Club gave the episode a "B" grade, writing "I'm not yet prepared to declare without qualification that Shameless has hit its stride [...] But "Nana Gallagher Had An Affair" is yet another step in the right direction." However, Alston was critical of Roberta's character, writing "she was brusque, conniving, and pugilistic for no good reason. [...] I understand the desire to have Monica pulled in different directions, but there's so much about Monica that's fascinating and nuanced, I'd prefer to have her bouncing off someone equally realized rather than a stock lesbian bully."

Alexandra Peers of Vulture wrote, "As Monica and Bob's truck drives off into the sunset, we can't help but feel the family would have been even better off if Frank had been sitting in the flatbed." Tim Basham of Paste wrote, "If anything good can come from the dark reality in a show like Shameless, it would be the awareness that in many American households, children are raising children. And usually not well."

Leigh Raines of TV Fanatic gave the episode a 3.5 star rating out of 5 and wrote "Monica is still around and contending with Frank for the title of worst Gallagher parent. It's no wonder Frank thinks they're soul mates. It's a constant competition of who's a bigger loser." Raines praised the continued development of Karen and Sheila's storyline: "I love the relationship between Karen and Sheila. It doesn't matter that Karen is a nymphomaniac and Sheila is a nutcase, the love between a mother and daughter is what truly showed." Jacob Clifton of Television Without Pity gave the episode a "C" grade; Clifton praised Karen and Sheila's development but criticized the handling of Monica's storyline, stating "what could have been a good episode and a fairly powerful ending instead just feels like a cartoon."
