= Aunt Ginger =

- Shameless episode
- Episode no.: Season 1 Episode 3
- Directed by: Stephen Hopkins
- Written by: Nancy M. Pimental
- Cinematography by: J. Michael Muro
- Editing by: Kelley Dixon
- Production code: 2J5403
- Original release date: January 23, 2011
- Running time: 51 minutes

Guest appearances
- Joan Cusack as Sheila Jackson; Jillian Armenante as Abby Ruggiero; Noel Fisher as Mickey Milkovich; Jane Levy as Mandy Milkovich; Gloria LeRoy as Aunt Ginger; Tyler Jacob Moore as Tony Markovich; Pej Vahdat as Kash

Episode chronology
← Previous "Frank the Plank"	Next → "Casey Casden"
- Shameless season 1

"Aunt Ginger" is the third episode of the first season of the American television comedy drama Shameless, an adaptation of the British series of the same name. The episode was written by producer Nancy M. Pimental, and directed by Stephen Hopkins. It originally aired on Showtime on January 23, 2011.

The series is set on the South Side of Chicago, Illinois, and depicts the poor, dysfunctional family of Frank Gallagher, a neglectful single father of six: Fiona, Phillip, Ian, Debbie, Carl, and Liam. He spends his days drunk, high, or in search of money, while his children need to learn to take care of themselves. In the episode, Fiona must locate their estranged aunt as a social security worker suspects Frank might be cashing her checks.

According to Nielsen Media Research, the episode was seen by an estimated 0.90 million household viewers and gained a 0.4/1 ratings share among adults aged 18–49. The episode received highly positive reviews from critics, who considered it an improvement over the previous episodes.

== Plot ==
Fiona has started a sexual relationship with Tony, a local cop who has had feelings for Fiona since childhood. At the market, Ian is approached by his classmate Mandy Milkovich, who wants to start a sexual relationship with him after he took revenge on a teacher for her. Ian is forced to take her home, where she tries to have sex with him. Ian rejects her, causing her to storm out in tears, which is witnessed by Fiona and Tony.

A social security worker visits the Gallagher home looking for Aunt Ginger, the owner of the family house who has supposedly been living in a Wisconsin nursing home; the worker suspects that someone has been cashing Aunt Ginger's checks for the past 12 years. Fiona confronts Frank, who reveals he has been the one cashing them. As she tries to contact Aunt Ginger, Fiona is constantly visited by Steve, who wants to repair their relationship and is frustrated that she is now with Tony. Fiona is also shocked upon learning that Tony was a virgin, and that she took his virginity. Meanwhile, Ian is hunted down by Mandy's brothers, including the eldest Mickey Milkovich, as Mandy had told them that Ian raped her. When the brothers fail to catch Ian, they brutally beat Lip instead.

When Fiona tries to get a car for Wisconsin, Frank is forced to reveal that Aunt Ginger actually died 12 years ago while she was doing drugs with him. With social security nearing an inspection, Fiona gets a senile woman from the local nursing home to pose as their aunt. After having the woman live at the Gallagher home for a few days and changing their pictures, they present her as Ginger and use her dementia as an advantage to avoid questions. As a result, the social security worker is forced to give the Gallaghers their check, which Fiona takes to use for their family needs. They return the woman to the nursing home, devastating Debbie, who had formed a bond with the old woman. Ian meets with Mandy and comes out as gay. Coming to terms with Ian's sexuality, Mandy decides to call off her brothers and agrees to be Ian's "girlfriend" in order to mask his sexuality. The episode concludes with Fiona deciding to turn down another date with Tony, and she surprises Steve by showing up at his job.

== Production ==
=== Development ===
The episode was written by producer Nancy M. Pimental, and directed by Stephen Hopkins. It was Pimental's first writing credit, and Hopkins' first directing credit.

== Reception ==
=== Viewers ===
In its original American broadcast, "Aunt Ginger" was seen by an estimated 0.90 million household viewers with a 0.4/1 in the 18–49 demographics. This means that 0.4 percent of all households with televisions watched the episode, while 1 percent of all of those watching television at the time of the broadcast watched it. This was a 11% increase in viewership from the previous episode, which was seen by an estimated 0.81 million household viewers with a 0.4/1 in the 18–49 demographics.

=== Critical reviews ===
"Aunt Ginger" received highly positive reviews from critics. Eric Goldman of IGN gave the episode an "amazing" 9 out of 10, writing "I thought it was a great hour of TV and my favorite episode so far of the series." Goldman gave particular praise towards Emma Kenney's performance as Debbie, writing "Young Emma Kenney is doing great work on this show, as a little girl who desperately is looking for parental (or grand-parental) figures in a life sorely lacking in that regard. Seeing her break down crying at the end was a heartbreaker."

Joshua Alston of The A.V. Club gave the episode a "B–" grade and wrote, "If I was the ideal Shameless viewer, how would I feel about the Gallaghers? As amused as bemused by their antisocial antics? What am I supposed to think about Frank? That he could be rehabilitated or at least somewhat redeemed? Should I love him as he is? There are times when I enjoy Shameless, but they are far outweighed by the times I'm too busy trying to figure out how I'm supposed to feel about it."

Alan Sepinwall of HitFix wrote that the episode "was the first episode of the American series to not have Paul Abbott's name on the script, and its titular storyline is the first significant plot of the series so far that isn't from the British show. And though I stopped watching British Shameless after the pilot, I don't think it's necessarily a coincidence that this is the first episode of the Showtime version that largely clicked for me." Alexandra Peers of Vulture wrote, "The emerging formula of the series should make it less interesting to watch, but the opposite's the case — we're waiting to see what Frank will get into this time. (He doesn't disappoint.)"

Tim Basham of Paste gave a positive review and commended William H. Macy as Frank, writing that he gave "another amazing performance." Leigh Raines of TV Fanatic gave the episode a 4 star rating out of 5. Jacob Clifton of Television Without Pity gave the episode an "A+" grade, believing the show to be finally finding its legs: "What we saw here was more confident, funnier and frankly more sophisticated than the first two episodes. Which were fine, just sometimes hinky [...] and all over the place. This one felt like it's a lot closer to jelling, and maybe it's just the director or the writer for this one episode, but I don't think so: I think this episode is what this show is like. Which is great news."
