= Frank Gallagher: Loving Husband, Devoted Father =

- Shameless episode
- Episode no.: Season 1 Episode 7
- Directed by: David Nutter
- Written by: Etan Frankel
- Cinematography by: Rodney Charters
- Editing by: Kelley Dixon
- Production code: 2J5407
- Original release date: February 20, 2011
- Running time: 43 minutes

Guest appearances
- Joan Cusack as Sheila Jackson; Noel Fisher as Mickey Milkovich; Robert Knepper as Rod; Jane Levy as Amanda Milkovich; Marguerite Moreau as Linda; Pej Vahdat as Kash; Timothy V. Murphy as Vlad; Tim Thomerson as A.B. Fisher

Episode chronology
← Previous "Killer Carl"	Next → "It's Time to Kill the Turtle"
- Shameless season 1

"Frank Gallagher: Loving Husband, Devoted Father" is the seventh episode of the first season of the American television comedy drama Shameless, an adaptation of the British series of the same name. The episode was written by Etan Frankel, and directed by David Nutter. It originally aired on Showtime on February 20, 2011.

The series is set on the South Side of Chicago, Illinois, and depicts the poor, dysfunctional family of Frank Gallagher, a neglectful single father of six: Fiona, Phillip, Ian, Debbie, Carl, and Liam. He spends his days drunk, high, or in search of money, while his children need to learn to take care of themselves. In the episode, Frank tries to solve his $6,000 debt, while Steve takes Fiona on a night out.

According to Nielsen Media Research, the episode was seen by an estimated 1.14 million household viewers and gained a 0.5/1 ratings share among adults aged 18–49. The episode received mixed-to-positive reviews from critics, with some questioning the closure to Frank's storyline.

== Plot ==
Rod and Vlad are pressuring Frank into paying his $6,000 debt or they will kill him. While walking to school, Lip, Ian and Mandy are asked by a truck driver for help as his tires blew up. Lip sends him on a wild-goose chase to a bar, and they seize the opportunity to contact Kevin and steal the truck's meat.

Seeing that Fiona has been under so much stress by having to take care of the children, Steve takes Kevin's advice into asserting what she wants. He decides to give Liam to be taken care of by Sheila, while he and Fiona go for a night out at an expensive hotel. While reluctant, Fiona agrees. At Sheila's house, Sheila is horrified to discover that Liam has wandered out of the house and is almost leaving the property. Sheila uses ropes to tie herself to the house to retrieve Liam, briefly overcoming her agoraphobia. Seeing that Kash was punched in the eye by Mickey, Ian decides to confront Mickey at his house. Mickey fights back, but they end up having sex, although Mickey asks him not to tell anyone. Meanwhile, Linda decides to set cameras in the store to prevent more robberies; Ian and Kash move it a few degrees so they can have sex without being seen.

As Frank tries to find ways to get money, he is advised by a homeless man that his life's troubles are over if he fakes his death. With the help of his children, Frank stages a fake funeral. Rod and Vlad are convinced, and decide to forget Frank's debt and leave town. Linda shows Kash that she discovered his affair with Ian, as the camera accidentally moved and showed their sexual encounter. She punches Ian in the face, and blackmails Kash into having another baby with her.

== Production ==
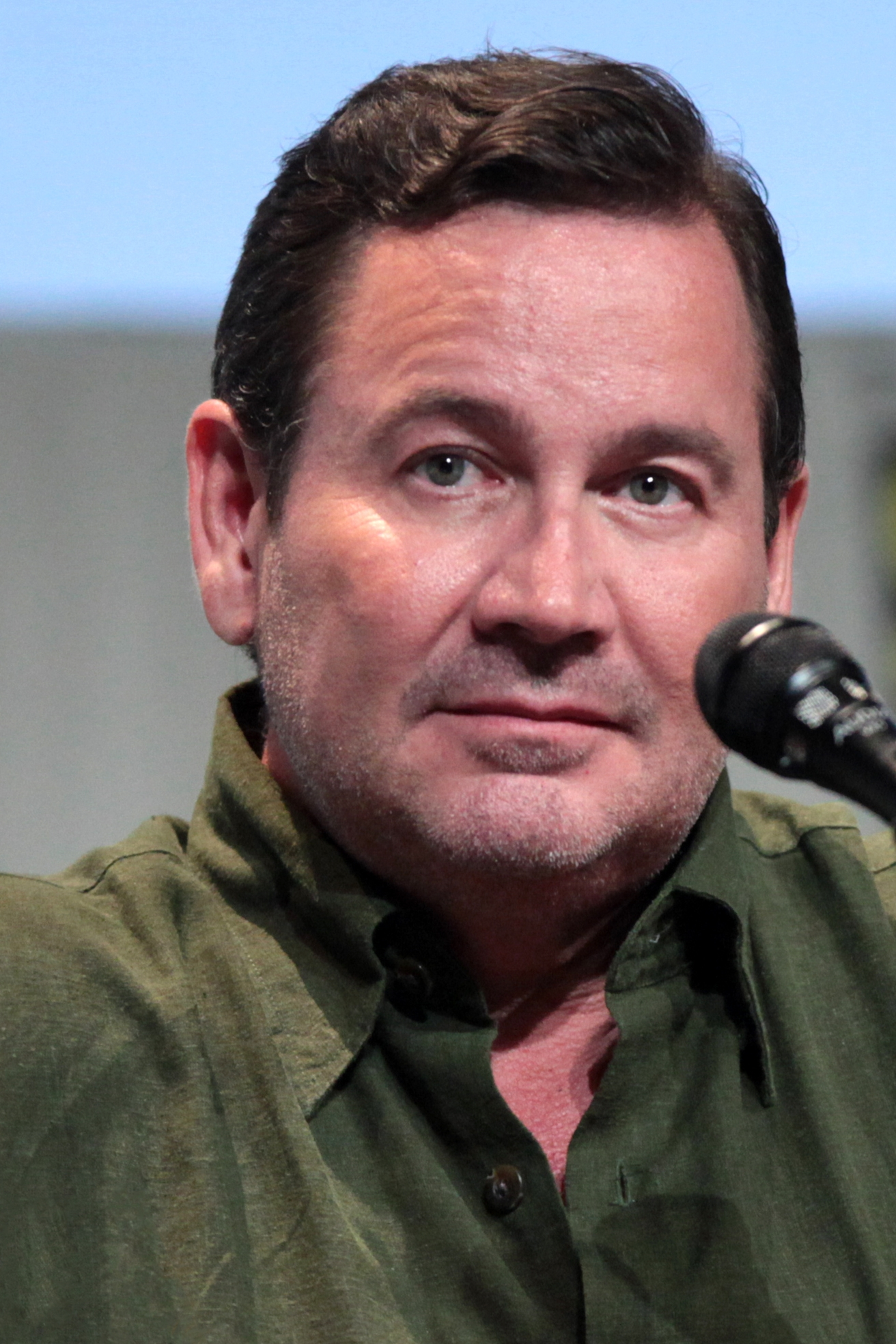
The episode was directed by David Nutter.

The episode was written by Etan Frankel, and directed by David Nutter. It was Frankel's first writing credit, and Nutter's first directing credit.

== Reception ==
=== Viewers ===
In its original American broadcast, "Father Frank: Loving Husband, Devoted Father" was seen by an estimated 1.14 million household viewers with a 0.5/1 in the 18–49 demographics. This means that 0.5 percent of all households with televisions watched the episode, while 1 percent of all of those watching television at the time of the broadcast watched it. This was a 12% increase in viewership from the previous episode, which was seen by an estimated 1.01 million household viewers with a 0.5/1 in the 18–49 demographics.

=== Critical reviews ===
"Father Frank: Loving Husband, Devoted Father" received mixed-to-positive reviews from critics. Joshua Alston of The A.V. Club gave the episode a "C" grade and wrote, "With each new episode of Shameless, my hatred of Steve abates a little bit more. In this week's installment, the reason for that was less to do with anything Steve did than the function the character serves. Are there guys who would be a better fit for Fiona than Steve? I'd say probably. But the character brings out Fiona's subtleties in a way that a relationship with Tony would."

Tim Basham of Paste wrote, "Though obviously done in an outrageous manner, Shameless does reflect the country's current economic woes. It can't be called an escape because those woes are constantly stuck in our faces. Instead, maybe it gives us an opportunity to laugh, only to keep us from crying." Jordan Cramer of TV Overmind gave the episode an "A" grade and wrote, "This week proved that a death in a television show can actually make an episode shine brighter than an original expectation. I'm glad to see that Frank hasn't really kicked the bucket as he provides a slew of hilarious moment's week in and week out. Hopefully next week, Frank can have some good moments without going six feet under."

Leigh Raines of TV Fanatic gave the episode a 4.5 star rating out of 5 and wrote, "Shameless has a formula. Each week a problem is presented and the whole family gets together to solve it. It's like watching a depraved version of Full House. Sometimes it works, for instance with the missing toddler. However, the fake death was STRETCHING it. Wouldn't the guys have checked the coffin before it was buried? Nonetheless, it's all very entertaining and the actors pull it off brilliantly." Jacob Clifton of Television Without Pity gave the episode an "A+" grade.

=== Accolades ===
For the episode, Joan Cusack received a nomination for Outstanding Guest Actress in a Drama Series at the 63rd Primetime Emmy Awards. She would lose to Loretta Devine for Grey's Anatomy.
