= Killer Carl =

- Shameless episode
- Episode no.: Season 1 Episode 6
- Directed by: John Dahl
- Written by: Mike O'Malley
- Cinematography by: Rodney Charters
- Editing by: Thomas Bolger
- Production code: 2J5406
- Original release date: February 13, 2011
- Running time: 49 minutes

Guest appearances
- Joan Cusack as Sheila Jackson; Dennis Boutsikaris as Professor Hearst; Noel Fisher as Mickey Milkovich; Brent Jennings as Principal Monroe; Robert Knepper as Rod; Marguerite Moreau as Linda; Joel Murray as Eddie Jackson; Pej Vahdat as Kash; Lily Mariye as Malaya; Timothy V. Murphy as Vlad

Episode chronology
← Previous "Three Boys"	Next → "Frank Gallagher: Loving Husband, Devoted Father"
- Shameless season 1

"Killer Carl" is the sixth episode of the first season of the American television comedy drama Shameless, an adaptation of the British series of the same name. The episode was written by consulting producer Mike O'Malley, and directed by John Dahl. It originally aired on Showtime on February 13, 2011.

The series is set on the South Side of Chicago, Illinois, and depicts the poor, dysfunctional family of Frank Gallagher, a neglectful single father of six: Fiona, Phillip, Ian, Debbie, Carl, and Liam. He spends his days drunk, high, or in search of money, while his children need to learn to take care of themselves. In the episode, Fiona tries to prevent Carl from being sent to Social Services, while Frank tries to flee from two thugs to whom he owes money.

According to Nielsen Media Research, the episode was seen by an estimated 1.01 million household viewers and gained a 0.5/1 ratings share among adults aged 18–49. The episode received highly positive reviews from critics, who praised its tone and the consequences of Frank's actions.

== Plot ==
The Gallaghers are left with no electricity, but Fiona promises to get money soon. However, she is approached by two thugs, Rod and Vlad, who state that Frank owes them $6,000 for a car, and threaten violence if Frank does not pay them back. Fiona scolds Frank for his actions, and asks him to attend a parents-teachers meeting for Carl, who is facing potential expulsion for his violent behavior. Frank is not interested, and is also forced to run through the city to evade the thugs. Karen ultimately agrees to distract the thugs, in exchange for Frank showing up as her father for a parent-teacher meeting. Meanwhile, Sheila gets a VR headset, in hopes that it could cure her agoraphobia, but experiences a mental breakdown when her nurse tries to deviate from the instructions.

Without Frank on board, Fiona is forced to attend a meeting with Carl's principal, who explain Carl's actions have raised concerns among the committee. As Fiona is neither his mother nor legal guardian, the principal demands that a parent visits that same day or they will call Child Protective Services. Kash is scolded by his wife Linda for the amount of robberies in the store, and warns that she will use their savings to buy expensive cameras. Noticing Mickey leaving without paying, Ian asks Kash to step up and be strict with the customers. Afraid, Kash instead asks Ian to buy the stolen items from other stores. When Linda discovers the robbery, she makes Kash learn how to use a weapon; Linda is impressed when Ian, using his ROTC training, shows Kash how to target.

To earn money, Lip takes SAT exams for other students. However, he is caught by Professor Hearst, a representative of the Educational Evaluation Service. Hearst believes Lip is cheating due to the high scores, but is surprised by his intelligence. He offers Lip an opportunity to prove himself and asks him not to fall into cheating again.

During Karen's parent-teacher meeting, the thugs arrive and brutally beat Frank, warning him to get the money in a few days. During this, Fiona and Lip once again try to convince Carl's teacher and principal to allow him to stay. Steve suddenly arrives, and wins over the principal by giving him marijuana. As Frank and Karen leave, they run into Fiona, Steve, Lip and Carl leaving their meeting; Fiona shares a tearful glance with Steve, affected by her father's betrayal. At Sheila's house, Frank comforts Sheila, telling her she will eventually learn how to live without her agoraphobia. Lip is visited by a classmate, who attacks him as his SAT test marks are invalidated. When he threatens to throw Lip out a window, Carl hits him in the leg with a baseball bat, earning him an ovation from his family.

== Production ==
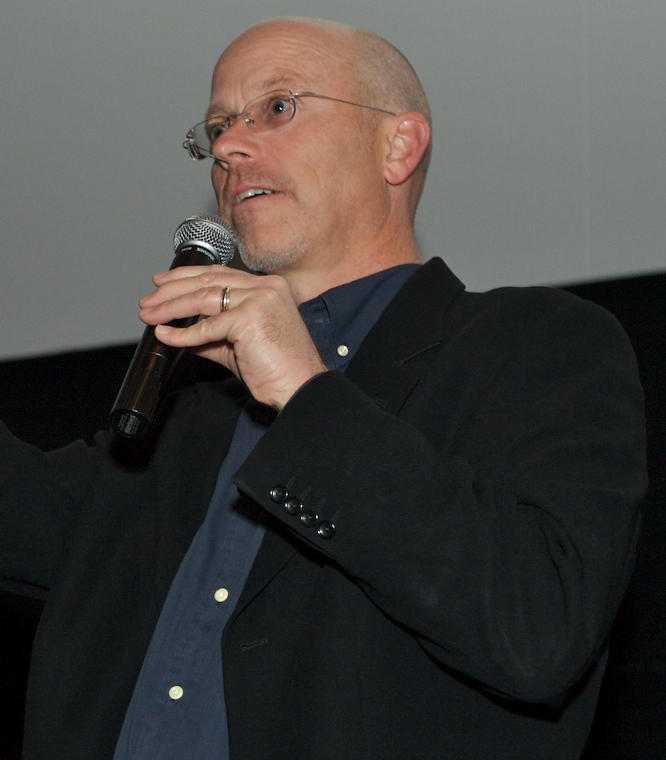
The episode was directed by John Dahl.

The episode was written by consulting producer Mike O'Malley, and directed by John Dahl. It was O'Malley's first writing credit, and Dahl's first directing credit.

== Reception ==
=== Viewers ===
In its original American broadcast, "Killer Carl" was seen by an estimated 1.01 million household viewers with a 0.5/1 in the 18–49 demographics. This means that 0.5 percent of all households with televisions watched the episode, while 1 percent of all of those watching television at the time of the broadcast watched it. This was a 6% increase in viewership from the previous episode, which was seen by an estimated 0.95 million household viewers with a 0.4/1 in the 18–49 demographics.

=== Critical reviews ===
"Killer Carl" received highly positive reviews from critics. Eric Goldman of IGN gave the episode a "great" 8.5 out of 10 and wrote, "Carl had been something of a neglected child on Shameless so far – at least when it comes to screen time. The funny thing is, he actually wasn't IN "Killer Carl" all that much – a bit more than usual, but not a tremendous amount. But his behavior still had a lot of consequences."

Joshua Alston of The A.V. Club gave the episode a "B" grade and wrote, "Carl routinely displays the behavior of a budding serial killer, and so long as the power doesn't go out in the process, no one gets bent out of shape about it. But whereas earlier I'd have been a little put off by the double standard, now it's just a nicely observed detail of the Gallagher family dynamic." Alexandra Peers of Vulture wrote, "The family seems to shake off Carl's behavior a bit too much. Perhaps because Carl is so self-contained in his chaos — he only kills the animals when no one else needs the microwave? — unlike Debbie, who hauls in a cast of characters to her crazy. But, this week, they can overlook it no longer."

Tim Basham of Paste wrote, "The tone of "Killer Carl" plays a tad more sober than previous episodes, but is perhaps necessary to further highlight Frank's inhumanity as a father." Jordan Cramer of TV Overmind gave the episode an "A+" grade and wrote, "Shameless is just starting to get its legs and I feel that this episode was the push needed to make Shameless a must watch show. The episode was fresh and very original in my eyes. Let's hope that we can see more episodes like this."

Leigh Raines of TV Fanatic gave the episode a 4.5 star rating out of 5 and wrote that the episode "was the perfect blend of comedic and poignant scenes." Jacob Clifton of Television Without Pity gave the episode an "A+" grade.
