= Lindsey Ginter =

American actor (1950–2024)

- Born: Lindsey Lee Ginter; December 13, 1950; Alameda, California, U.S.
- Died: September 1, 2024 (aged 73)
- Other names: Lindsay Lee Ginter, L.L. Ginter
- Occupation: Actor
- Years active: 1983–2024
- Spouse(s): Mai Ginter married 2003-2024 (nee: Mai To Pham, SAG name : Lee Mary Weilnau - (active 1987-1996)
- Children: Eden Ginter (1978)

Lindsey Lee Ginter (December 13, 1950 – September 1, 2024) was an American actor.

Ginter is known as Crew Cut Man, a government assassin, in the television series The X-Files and as Sam Austen, Kate Austen's father, in Lost.

== Background ==
Ginter was born in Alameda, California on December 13, 1950. He died on September 1, 2024, at the age of 73.

== Career ==
Ginter appeared in films including Blood In Blood Out, Beverly Hills Cop III, Gattaca, Mercury Rising, Pearl Harbor, S.W.A.T., The L.A. Riot Spectacular, Transformers: Dark of the Moon and Argo.

== Filmography ==
Year	Title	Role	Notes
1991	Jake and the Fatman	Rolf	2 episodes
1991–1992	Street Justice	Thomas Hardin	3 episodes
1993	Blood In Blood Out	Officer Young	
1994	Beverly Hills Cop III	Holloway	
1994	The X-Files	The Cleaner / Crew Cut Man	2 episodes
1994–1996	Renegade	Chuck Woodley / Rocky Scholl	3 episodes
1994–1998	Walker, Texas Ranger	Dirk Morgan / Troy Cochran	2 episodes
1995	Timemaster	Commando Leader	
1995	Eye of the Stalker	Officer Weldon	TV movie
1997	Acts of Betrayal	Hydra	
1997	Mars	Ike Ringo	
1997	Gattaca	Mission Commander	
1997	Dark Skies	Sergeant Linson	Episode: "Bloodlines"
1997	JAG	Captain McNamara	Episode: "Cowboys & Cossacks"
1998	Mercury Rising	Peter Burrell	
1998	The Practice	John Schramm	2 episodes
2000	Star Trek: Voyager	Saavedra	Episode: "Memorial"
2001	Pearl Harbor	Captain Low	
2003	Alias	Mr. Johnson	Episode: "A Free Agent"
2003	S.W.A.T.	Agent Hauser	
2004	Angel	Commander Petrie	Episode: "Why We Fight"
2005	The L.A. Riot Spectacular	Jury Foreman	
2005–2006	Lost	Sgt. Sam Austen	2 episodes
2010	Radio Free Albemuth	FBI Agent	Uncredited
2011	Shameless	Charlie	Episode: "Daddyz Girl"
2011	Transformers: Dark of the Moon	Old NASA Scientist #1	
2011	Admissions	Man in Suit	Short
2012	Argo	Hedley Donovan	
2012	Hitchcock	Male Prop Master	
2013	Cleaners	Lead Agent	Episode: "The Blown Job
2014	Beneath Existence	Zeke	Short
2014	Atlas Shrugged Part III: Who Is John Galt?	Dispatcher #3	
2015	Forgiveness	Judge Williamson	
2015	The Evil Gene	Warden Sweeney	
