= Pilot (Shameless) =

- Shameless episode
- Episode no.: Season 1 Episode 1
- Directed by: Mark Mylod
- Story by: Paul Abbott
- Teleplay by: Paul Abbott; John Wells
- Cinematography by: J. Michael Muro
- Editing by: David Moritz
- Production code: 296769
- Original release date: January 9, 2011
- Running time: 58 minutes

Guest appearances
- Joan Cusack as Sheila Jackson; Marguerite Moreau as Linda; Joel Murray as Eddie Jackson; Pej Vahdat as Kash; Laura Slade Wiggins as Karen Jackson

Episode chronology
← Previous —	Next → "Frank the Plank"
- Shameless season 1

"Pilot" is the series premiere of the American television comedy drama Shameless, an adaptation of the British series of the same name. The episode was written by executive producer Paul Abbott and series developer John Wells, and directed by Mark Mylod. It originally aired on Showtime on January 9, 2011.

The series is set on the South Side of Chicago, Illinois, and depicts the poor, dysfunctional family of Frank Gallagher, a neglectful single father of six: Fiona, Phillip, Ian, Debbie, Carl, and Liam. He spends his days drunk, high, or in search of money, while his children need to learn to take care of themselves.

According to Nielsen Media Research, the episode was seen by an estimated 0.98 million household viewers and gained a 0.4/1 ratings share among adults aged 18–49, making it Showtime's biggest turnout for a series premiere since Dead Like Me in 2003. The series premiere received generally positive reviews from critics, who praised the performances, tone and characters, though some critics felt the pilot was a lackluster adaptation of the original.

== Plot ==
The pilot of the American adaption of Shameless focuses on the family of alcoholic patriarch Frank Gallagher, who introduces his six kids: his eldest daughter Fiona, the extraordinarily intelligent Lip, the strong-hearted Ian, the sweet-hearted Debbie, the troublemaking and unruly Carl and baby Liam.

Fiona and her best friend Veronica Fisher go to a nightclub, but a man steals Fiona's purse. As they chase him, a man named Steve Wilton tries to catch the thief but fails. Despite that, Steve earns admiration from Fiona and Veronica after punching the security guard for not letting them back into the nightclub. Steve accompanies Fiona to her house, meeting the family and Veronica's boyfriend, Kevin. After everyone goes to sleep, Fiona and Steve have sex in the kitchen but are interrupted when the police arrive to return a drunk and unconscious Frank. Steve returns to the Gallagher home the following day, but Fiona dismisses him as desperate. Noticing the family's broken washing machine, Steve decides to buy Fiona a new Samsung washing machine; Fiona is visibly impressed by this grand gesture.

Meanwhile, Lip gets money by tutoring his promiscuous classmate Karen Jackson, and she surprises him by giving him oral sex under the kitchen table. Returning home, Lip discovers a hidden gay pornographic magazine and suspects it belongs to Ian. Lip confronts Ian over the magazine and challenges him to visit Karen and get oral sex to prove otherwise. While Karen's mother Sheila is oblivious to the event, they are discovered by Karen's religious father Eddie. Enraged, Eddie flips the table and chases Lip and Ian through the house; Lip is forced to jump off the second floor to escape, injuring himself. While visiting the local market that Ian works at, Lip is shocked to discover that Ian is having sex with his boss, Kash; Lip chastises Ian for pursuing an affair with a married man.

Fiona and Steve go on a date, where Fiona discovers that he is actually a car thief. While surprised, Fiona accepts his profession and they go joyriding in a stolen car. As they return home, they are confronted by Frank over the washing machine. While drinking with Frank, Steve learns more about Fiona's upbringing; it is revealed that Frank's estranged wife Monica has run away from the family, leaving only Fiona to fend for her siblings and deal with her alcoholic father. The following morning, Lip and Ian make up, with Lip showing acceptance over Ian's sexuality. The family, joined by Steve, proceed to have breakfast, while an asleep Frank lies on the floor.

== Development ==
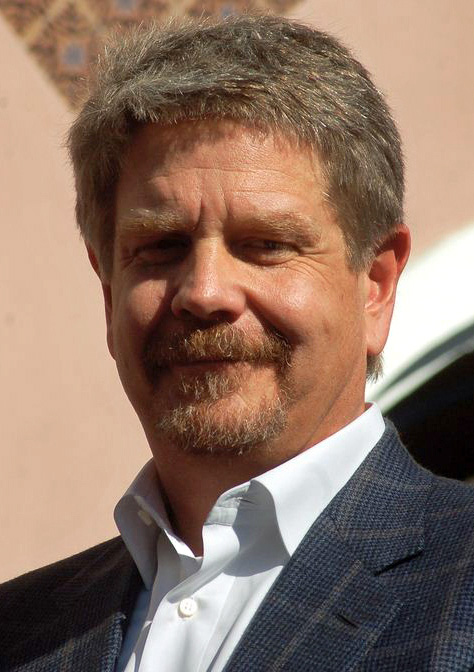
The pilot was written by John Wells (pictured) and the creator of the original British series, Paul Abbott.

In January 2009, HBO began developing a pilot on an American adaptation of the long-running British series of the same name; the announcement occurred following a lengthy negotiation with the original series' creator, Paul Abbott. The project had initially been in talks with NBC, like many other series produced by developer John Wells, but Wells was concerned over having to accommodate to broadcast network standards. The pilot is a direct adaptation of the first episode of the British version, and was written by Abbott and Wells, and directed by Mark Mylod. It was Abbott's first writing credit, Wells' first writing credit, and Mylod's first directing credit. In an interview with The Futon Critic, Wells revealed that he was intrigued by the project because of the dynamics of the Gallagher family in the original series, stating "I found myself very attracted to the family and the way in which these kids were raising themselves and cared for each other [...] A lot of people don't feel that in their own home." Wells fought efforts against network executives to place the show in the South or in a trailer park, saying "We have a comedic tradition of making fun of the people in those worlds. The reality is that these people aren't 'the other' — they're people who live four blocks down from you and two blocks over."

By April 2009, the project had been moved from HBO to Showtime, and in October, it was reported that William H. Macy would star in the lead role as Frank Gallagher. Later that year, Dragonball Evolution co-stars Emmy Rossum and Justin Chatwin signed on for the roles of Fiona and Steve respectively; Allison Janney was also cast for the recurring role of Sheila, a love interest for Frank. Jeremy Allen White was cast for the role of Lip. In an interview with the Los Angeles Times, White revealed that he initially auditioned for the role of Ian: "Originally, I kind of liked Ian a little bit more. I thought he was a little more interesting. I felt like I had read Lip; I felt like I already knew who he was. I thought I already had him pegged down. Then I gave it a few more reads and I realized I was being an idiot. I really had no idea." To prepare for the role of Lip and the show's themes of alcoholism, White attended Al-Anon meetings in New York and drew from those experiences. In August 2010, it was announced that Janney would be leaving the show, due to her series regular commitment on the ABC comedy Mr. Sunshine. The role of Sheila was re-cast with Joan Cusack, and Janney's already-filmed scenes in the pilot were reshot.

== Reception ==
=== Viewers ===
In its original American broadcast, "Pilot" was seen by an estimated 0.98 million household viewers with a 0.4/1 in the 18–49 demographics. This means that 0.4 percent of all households with televisions watched the episode, while 1 percent of all of those watching television at the time of the broadcast watched it.

=== Critical reviews ===
The pilot received generally positive reviews from critics. Eric Goldman of IGN gave the episode a "great" 8.5 out of 10, praising the tone and likeable cast: "I've seen the first three episodes of Shameless and can say that the pilot is a good representation of what's to come – Abbott's history with the original means he comes into the series with a lot of confidence and knowledge on how to set the stage and introduce the characters in interesting and involving ways. Showtime has another compelling show worth checking out here."

Emily St. James' review for The A.V. Club was generally positive, with St. James commending Rossum's performance as Fiona: "[Rossum] seems to inhabit this character and the reality of trying to hold together this family in this particular place and time better than any of the other actors in the show." However, she was critical of the character of Sheila, writing "It's a Joan Cusack part [...] but it feels so disconnected from the rest of the series". She also criticized Justin Chatwin's performance as Steve, writing "[It's] difficult to buy Steve and Fiona's romance, and almost all of that stems from Chatwin, who plays the guy as someone who's a deadly combination of smug and boring." St. James ultimately gave the episode a "B" grade.

Alan Sepinwall of HitFix was largely positive in his review, writing "That's Shameless in 30 seconds or less: messy, overcrowded, unapologetically frank and, at times, darkly funny." Alexandra Peers of Vulture wrote, "At other moments, Shameless aims for a shabby grandeur, but this is no Angela's Ashes. One reason to keep watching is Cusack, as an episode guide notes she soon goes looking for her missing Ballerina Barbie." Tim Basham of Paste praised Rossum's performance, concluding "it's Rossum above everyone else who sparkles in one of those watch-out-for-her performances. From resentment to despair, to joy and anger, her range of genuine emotion is inspiring. [...] And though I tuned in mainly to see [Macy], I'll keep watching to see Rossum." Jacob Clifton of Television Without Pity gave the episode an "A+" grade.

Some critics reacted negatively to the episode. Kris King of Slant Magazine wrote, "while Frank's high jinks are good for a chuckle, and his love/hate relationship with his kids speaks a lot about the complicated nature of having a down-and-out family, Shameless tries too hard to milk weighty drama from generally dull characters." Dustin Rowles of Pajiba criticized the pilot for failing to adapt the original source material for an American audience, writing "I was completely incapable of divorcing the American version. It just felt like American actors doing a very poor imitation of the British pilot." Sam Wollaston of The Guardian expressed similar sentiments, comparing Macy's performance negatively to David Threlfall's portrayal of Frank Gallagher in the original series, and further concluded "all [the pilot] really does is remind us how great the original was."
