= Frank the Plank =

- Shameless episode
- Frank (right) confronts Ian (left; back to screen) before hitting him. William H. Macy pushed the network to keep the scene in after they expressed concerns with it.
- Episode no.: Season 1 Episode 2
- Directed by: John Wells
- Story by: Paul Abbott
- Teleplay by: Paul Abbott; John Wells
- Cinematography by: J. Michael Muro
- Editing by: Thomas Bolger
- Production code: 2J5402
- Original release date: January 16, 2011
- Running time: 54 minutes

Guest appearances
- Joan Cusack as Sheila Jackson; Tyler Jacob Moore as Tony Markovich; Joel Murray as Eddie Jackson

Episode chronology
← Previous "Pilot"	Next → "Aunt Ginger"
- Shameless season 1

"Frank the Plank" is the second episode of the first season of the American television dramedy Shameless, an adaptation of the British series of the same name. The episode was directed by series creator John Wells, written by Wells and executive producer Paul Abbott, and based on an episode of the British series that Abbott wrote. It originally aired in the United States on Showtime on January 16, 2011.

The series is set on the South Side of Chicago, Illinois, and depicts the poor, dysfunctional Gallagher family, including patriarch Frank (William H. Macy), a neglectful single father of six: Fiona (Emmy Rossum), Phillip (Jeremy Allen White), Ian (Cameron Monaghan), Debbie (Emma Kenney), Carl (Ethan Cutkosky), and Liam(Blake and Brennan Johnson). He often spends his days under the influence of drugs and alcohol, while his children have to care for themselves. In the episode, a passport-less Frank is brought into Canada by Fiona's boyfriend Steve, forcing the Gallaghers to retrieve him after he is incarcerated.

The episode contains the first use of the series' opening credits, which were filmed in October 2010, and is set to "The Luck You Got" by The High Strung. It was suggested by music supervisor Ann Kline to use the song. Showtime disapproved of Frank hitting Ian, and asked the writers to cut it. It was not until William H. Macy compromised with them and filmed an apology scene that they allowed it in. Upon release, the episode received generally mixed reviews from critics, who were divided over the episode's handling of Frank.

== Plot ==
Gallagher family patriarch Frank goes to the bar, where he is punched by Eddie Jackson, whose daughter Karen was caught giving fellatio to Frank's son Ian, with encouragement from his other son Lip. Frank returns home and punches Ian in the nose, prompting Steve, the boyfriend of Frank's eldest child Fiona, to scold him; Fiona is forced by Frank to kick Steve out. The following day, Frank goes missing, and the family worries, as it is the day he prepares for his disability checks, something Frank never misses. Frank soon wakes up in Toronto and is subsequently arrested for not carrying a passport.

While Fiona and her five younger siblings debate on what to do, as getting a passport for Frank could take months, Steve reveals that he smuggled Frank into Canada with his stolen car, feeling he could finally solve the family's issues. Fiona slaps him and demands he brings him back. Steve gets an RV with a secret smuggling compartment for Frank, and drives to Canada with several others. Meanwhile, local cop Tony Markovich asks Fiona out on a date, which she considers. After Steve successfully smuggles Frank back into Chicago, Fiona breaks up with him. Steve tries to win her over with a new car, but Fiona tells him that the family does not need more free stuff from him, and asserts that she will pay him back for everything else he has gotten them.

Feeling unwanted by his family and friends after they taunt him with a Canadian themed welcome party, Frank decides to move out of the house, but is unable to find a new home. He runs into Eddie at the bar, who apologizes for his actions and reveals that he has left Karen and her agoraphobic mother Sheila, who receives disability benefits from the welfare state. Intrigued, Frank visits Sheila and attempts to manipulate her into letting him stay over. He eventually convinces Sheila to have sex, but is quickly taken aback by her dominatrix behavior; he soon becomes accustomed to this, however. The next morning, Karen is dismayed to learn that Frank has officially moved into their home.

== Production ==
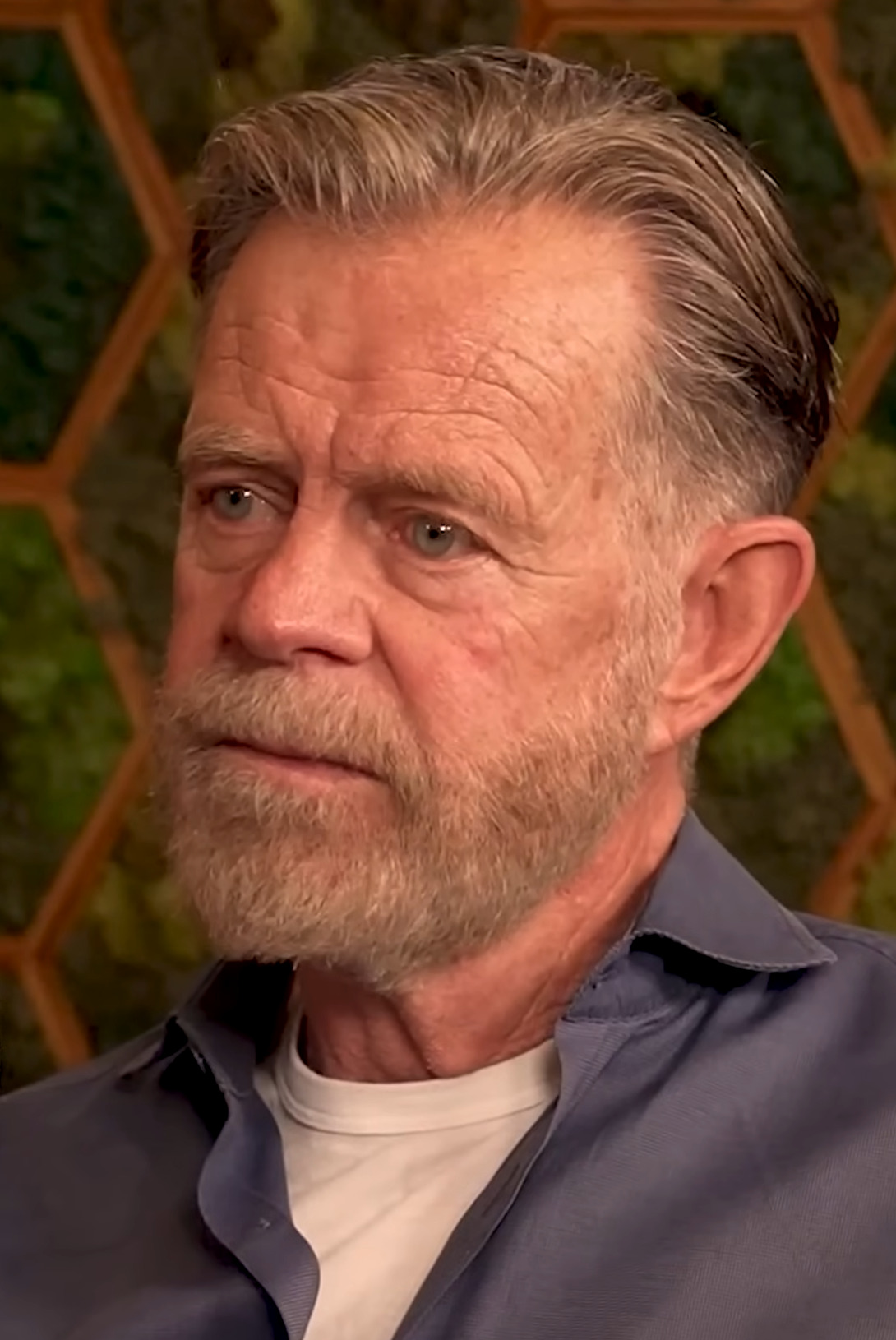
William H. Macy advocated for the scene of Frank hitting Ian, which the network objected to.

"Frank the Plank" was written by executive producer Paul Abbott, based on a teleplay from himself and John Wells, and directed by Wells. It was Abbott's second writing credit, Wells' second, and his first directing credit. Final credits for the episode were given to Wells and Abbott on December 13, 2010. Shameless is a U.S. adaptation of the British television series of the same name, and "Frank the Plank" directly follows that version's second episode, "We're Going to the Moon", which Abbott also wrote.

Guest stars in the episode include Joan Cusack as Sheila Jackson, Tyler Jacob Moore as Tony Markovich, and Joel Murray as Eddie Jackson. Frank hitting Ian in the episode's opening was the only scene from the series' first season that Showtime objected to, specifically taking issue with Frank not showing remorse for his actions. Not wishing to tone down the moment, William H. Macy, who portrays Frank on the series, compromised with the network and shot another scene where Frank gives a "baffled apology" in exchange for keeping it in.

The episode contains the first use of the series' opening credits, showing the daily lives of the Gallaghers while they each do various things in the bathroom. The intro was shot in late October 2010, and, according to Justin Chatwin, the unidentified pair of buttocks seen in it were his, jokingly stating that getting them "touched up" was "surprisingly enjoyable". Playing over the opening credits is the song "The Luck You Got" by The High Strung, which intentionally has an upbeat sound and tone that juxtaposes the messy bathroom and lewd activities that happen in it. Shameless' music supervisor Ann Kline approached the crew with the song, and suggested it could be used; they agreed that it suited the series and was a "wonderful piece of music", according to executive producer Andrew Stearn, so it was chosen.

== Release ==
"Frank the Plank" was first broadcast on Showtime at 10:00 p.m. ET on January 16, 2011. In the United States, the episode was watched by a total of 0.81 million household viewers during its original broadcast, making it the most-watched show on the channel for the night. It garnered a 0.4% rating among adults between the ages of 18 and 49, meaning that it was seen by 0.4% of all adults in that demographic, and captured 1% of all viewers watching television at the time of its broadcast. It marked an 18% decrease in viewership from the previous episode, "Pilot", which was seen by an estimated 0.98 million household viewers, and also garnered a 0.4/1 in the 18–49 demographic.

Following the episode's premiere, Showtime started to sell merchandise based on the episode, particularly shirts and water bottles with the phrase "Frank the Plank" on them. Along with the rest of the season, the episode was first released on home video in the United States on December 27, 2011, in the Complete First Season box set, on DVD and Blu-ray formats.

== Reception ==
Eric Goldman of IGN gave "Frank the Plank" an 8 out of 10, praising the cast performances and enjoying the family dynamic seen in the episode. Goldman particularly liked seeing how the family was portrayed "mak[ing] ends meet" in it, with the family all trying to make money throughout, noting how the episode goes out of its way to make the Gallaghers out to be "resourceful". Overall, he felt the best moments of the episode were the "great" scenes between Frank and Sheila. The A.V. Club writer Joshua Alston was more mixed towards the episode, criticizing the use of Steve, finding him "creepy" and considering his portrayer Justin Chatwin to not have enough charisma to save his character. Alston also reacted negatively towards the pairing of Frank and Sheila as not "terribly funny or compelling [...] I needed that sequence to be over as quickly as possible." He ultimately gave the episode a B−, finding the smaller, not plot-driven scenes like Debbie hoarding coupons and Lip helping his neighbor Veronica steal milk to be the best of the episode, still feeling the series had still not yet proven a reason to exist by this point, and worrying that even the smaller scenes he enjoyed would grow tired by the season's end.

Alan Sepinwall of HitFix was mixed over the episode's exploration of Frank, writing "it seemed like the show was going to go a little deeper than just letting Frank be a disappointing but ultimately lovable lush [...] But by the time Frank woke up in Canada, he was back to being harmless comic relief." Sepinwall concluded "The draw here comes from Emmy Rossum and the kids (particularly the actors who play Lip and Ian) and their own problems, and so an episode where they're almost exclusively reacting to Frank didn't feel as strong as the pilot." Alexandra Peers of Vulture commented positively of the episode's exploration of Frank, but questioned the decision to cast Emmy Rossum as Fiona, writing "Emmy Rossum is a few years older than her character is supposed to be, which is a problem for the show; Fiona's situation is sadder than even Rossum's [skillful], heartfelt performance can capture."

Tim Basham of Paste wrote, "Watching Shameless is a little like watching modern dance. There's a lot going on and it all seems to be moving in several directions. But in the end it comes together quite nicely. Whereas the first episode gave more attention to Fiona, this one gave William Macy's role as the reluctant patriarch Frank Gallagher a lot more room to share his total dysfunction. It's wonderful to behold." Leigh Raines of TV Fanatic gave the episode a 2.5 star rating out of 5; Raines commented on the episode's dismal tone, and wrote of Frank's character: "We got to see a lot more of the alcoholic enigma that is Frank, and let's just say that despite William H. Macy's fabulous method acting, it wasn't pretty." Jacob Clifton of Television Without Pity gave the episode an "A+" grade.
