= Gloria LeRoy =

American actress (1925–2018)

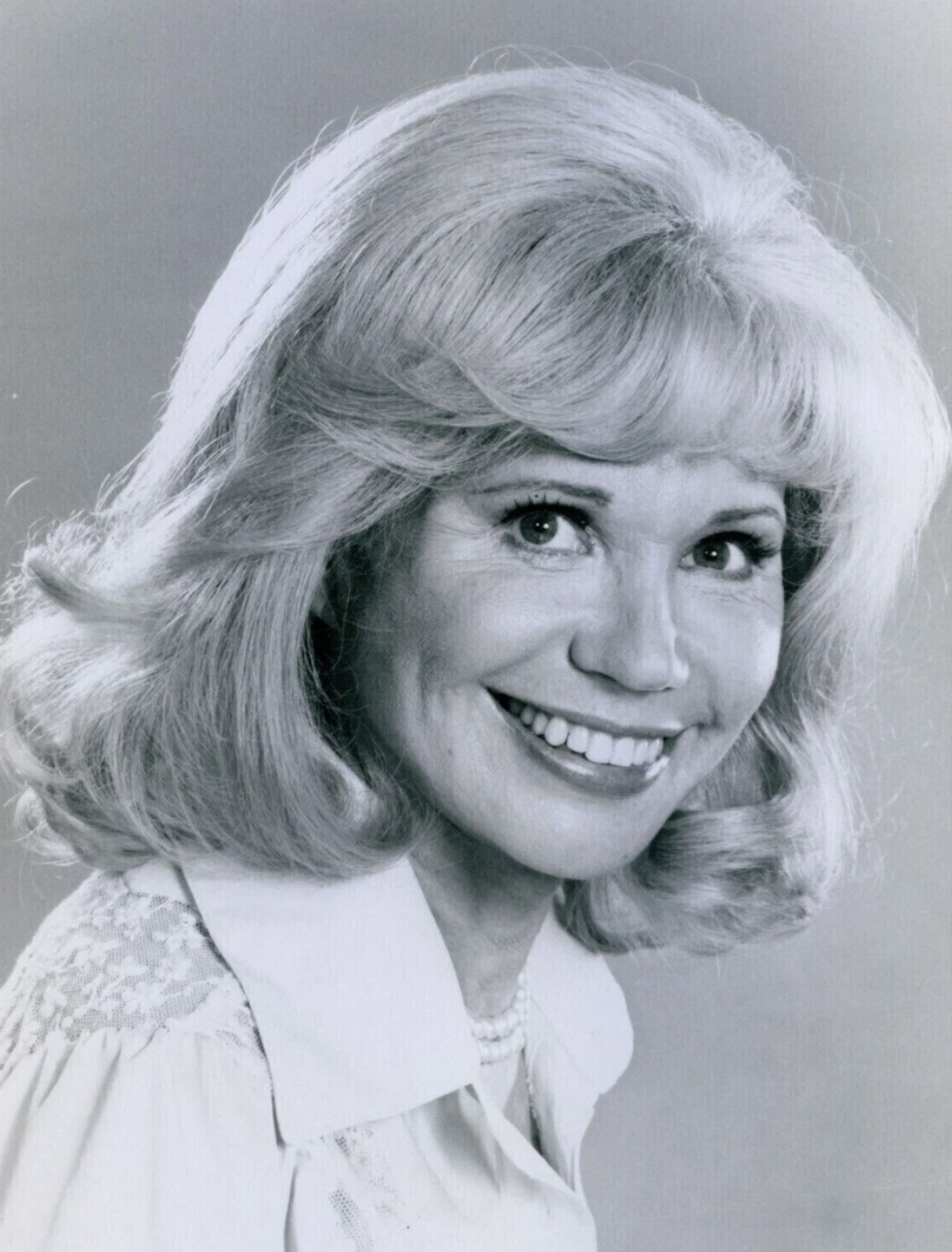
- LeRoy in Kaz, 1978
- Born: Gloria Jacqueline LeRoy; November 7, 1925; Bucyrus, Ohio, U.S.
- Died: May 26, 2018 (aged 92); Los Angeles, California, U.S.
- Occupation: Actress
- Years active: 1943–2018

Gloria Jacqueline LeRoy (November 7, 1925 – May 26, 2018) was an American character actress. She had a diverse career on stage, in film, and on television. Her film career began after Norman Lear spotted her on stage and cast her in The Night They Raided Minsky's in 1968. She is perhaps best known for playing the voluptuous Mildred "Boom Boom" Turner in the 1970s sitcom All in the Family.

== Biography ==
LeRoy was born in 1925 to vaudeville performers Loletta and Russell LeRoy in Bucyrus, Ohio. When she was a young girl the family moved to New York, where they owned a dance school, which both Gloria and her brother Kenneth studied. Kenneth went on to star on Broadway as a dancer and singer and was the first Bernardo in West Side Story. Gloria performed on Broadway in Artists and Models with Jackie Gleason in 1943 at age 17 as a Specialty Dancer. Her early career started in night clubs as a dancer and singer for Barbara Walters's father, impresario Lou Walters, at the Latin Quarter. She later headlined Nouvelle Eve, a Parisian cabaret show import, at the Hotel El Rancho Vegas from 1951 to 1952.

She was cast in a production of Hello, Dolly! (1964) as Ernestina Money, but was replaced by Mary Jo Catlett. She toured with Ann Corio's This Was Burlesque as a tassel-twirler. She also appeared in George M! A New Musical.

She had recurring roles on the soaps Days of Our Lives as Queenie (1989), The Young and the Restless as Beatrice Tucker (1998) and Passions as Ruth (2000). She appeared in Three's Company as Nancy in the episode "The Goodbye Guy" (1980), as well as on Married... with Children as Chesty LaRue in the episode "Live Nude Peg" (1997). In 2001, she appeared in the season 8 Frasier episode "A Day in May" as Mrs. Smolenski, a prospective house buyer. In 2007, LeRoy appeared in the pilot episode of Rules of Engagement. In 2009, she appeared in season 5 of Desperate Housewives as Rose Kemper. She also appeared in season 1 and season 2 episodes of the Showtime series Shameless as Aunt Ginger. Her final appearances were in season 3 episodes of the HBO series Getting On in 2015.

LeRoy died in Los Angeles, California, on May 26, 2018, at age 92.

== Filmography ==
=== Film ===
Year	Title	Role	Notes
1968	The Night They Raided Minsky's	Mae Harris	
1971	Cold Turkey	Lottie Davenport (Masseuse)	
1971	The Gang That Couldn't Shoot Straight	Ida	
1974	Welcome to Arrow Beach	Ginger	
1975	The Day of the Locust	Mrs. Loomis	
1978	Bloodbrothers	Sylvia	
1980	Cheaper to Keep Her	Woman on Diving Board	
1980	Tricks of the Trade		
1981	Honky Tonk Freeway	Fish Restaurant Waitress	
1981	Pennies from Heaven	A Prostitute	
1986	Sid and Nancy	Grandma	
1986	Stewardess School	Grandma Polk	
1987	Barfly	Grandma Moses	
1990	Cool Blue	Ida	Video
1992	Body Waves	Mrs. Matthews	
1992	Final Embrace	Velvet	
1993	Snapdragon	Nurse	
1994	Bad Blood	Elderly Bank Lady	
1996	Going Home	Toni	Short
1997	Sparkler	Maxine	
1997	Jack	Mrs. Goodman	
1999	The Clock	Gracie	Short
1999	Pumpkin Hill	Gracie	Short
2000	Sordid Lives	Peggy Ingram	
2000	Face the Music	Grandma	
2001	All You Need	Nana Sabistan	
2003	Shotgun	Minnie	Short
2005	The Amateurs	Mrs. Mendelson	
2010	Quit	Pawn Clerk	
2014	Out	Louise	Short

=== Television ===
Year	Title	Role	Note
1972	Gunsmoke	Claire	Episode: Eleven Dollars
1972	Gunsmoke	Hannah Kincaid	Episode: The River part 1&2
1972	All in the Family	Bobbi Jo Loomis	Episode: The Threat
1973	Love, American Style		Episode: Love and the Cozy Comrades
1973	Cannon		Episode: The Perfect Alibi
1973	The Blue Knight		TV film
1973	Miracle on 34th Street	Mother #1	TV film
1974	Mannix	Jenny	Episode: Mask for a Charade
1974	Gunsmoke	Mady	2 episodes
1974	The Streets of San Francisco	Mrs. Ledbetter	2 episode 1974, 1976
1974	All in the Family	Mildred 'Boom Boom' Turner	2 episodes 1974, 1978
1975	Hot L Baltimore	Millie	
1975	Baretta	Doris Mazurski	Episode: When Dues Come Down
1975	Petrocelli	Mrs Ames / Zasu O'Brien	2 episode
1975	The Bob Crane Show	Lola	Episode: Son of the Campus Capers
1976	Richie Brockelman: The Missing 24 Hours	Hooker	TV film
1976	Baretta	Wicked Wanda	Episode: "Shoes"
1976	In the Glitter Palace	Norma Addison	TV film
1977	The Strange Possession of Mrs. Oliver	Saleslady	TV film
1977	Alice	Bar Waitress	Episode: Alice by Moonlight
1978-1979	Kaz	Mary Parnell	22 episodes
1979	But Mother!	Trixie	TV film
1979	Topper	Saleswoman	TV film
1980	Scruples	Rosie	
1980	The Ropers	Gloria Mealy	Episode: Old Flames
1980	Three's Company	Nancy	Episode: The Goodbye Guy
1981	Behind the Screen	Drunk Lady	Episode: 1.2
1982	WKRP in Cincinnati	Sheila	1 episode
1982	Hill Street Blues	Rena	2 episodes
1983	Automan	Landlady	Episode: Automan
1985	Crazy Like a Fox		Episode: The Man Who Cried Fox
1985	It's a Living	Customer	Episode: Harassed
1986	Falcon Crest	Minister's Wife	Episode: Captive Hearts
1987	Warm Hearts, Cold Feet	Waitress	TV film
1987	Hunter	Landlady	Episode: The Girl Next Door)
1989	Days of Our Lives	Queenie	
1991	The Flash	Pearl	1 episode
1991	Flash III: Deadly Nightshade	Pearl	
1993	Doogie Howser, M.D.	Nancy Jameson	Episode: Dorky Housecall, M.D.
1994	The Larry Sanders Show	Helen	Episode: Next Stop Bottom
1994	Viper	Elderly Bank Lady	
1995	Dad, the Angel & Me	Opera Diva Nanny	TV film
1995	Weird Science	Grandma	Episode: Grampira
1996	Dr. Quinn, Medicine Woman	Ilsa Lawsenstrom	Episode: Woman of the Year
1996	ER	Beth Lang	Episode: Homeless for the Holidays
1997	Married... with Children	Stripper	Episode:Live Nude Peg
1998	Tracey Takes On...	Mrs. Jordache	Episode: Loss
1998	3rd Rock from the Sun	Dolores	Episode: Portrait of Tommy as an Old Man
1998	Saved by the Bell: The New Class	Florence	Episode: Free for All
1998	The Young and the Restless	Beatrice Tucker	Recurring Guest Role
1999	Tracey Takes On...	Woman	Episode: Books
1999	Chicago Hope	Alzheimer-patiente	Episode: Vanishing Acts
2000	Passions	Ruth	9 episodes
2001	Dharma & Greg	Jeannette	Episode: How This Happened
2001	Diagnosis Murder	Christine Wilson	Episode: The Blair Nurse Project
2001	Frasier	Mrs. Smolenskis	Episode: A Day in May
2002	Malcolm in the Middle	Martha	Episode: Hal Coaches
2004	My Wife and Kids	Grandmother	Episode: Childcare Class
2004	Drake & Josh	Popcorn Buyer	Episode: The Gary Grill
2004	Charmed	Old Brenda	Episode: Charrrmed!
2006	Malcolm in the Middle	Judith	Episode: Malcolm's Money
2007	Rules of Engagement	Margaret	Episode: Pilot
2009	Desperate Housewives	Rose Kemper	2 episodes
2011-2012	Shameless	Aunt Ginger	Episodes: Aunt Ginger and Summer Loving
2014	Suburgatory	Esther	1 episode
2015	Getting On	Vivian 'Mama Viv' Hartley	2 episodes, (final appearance)
