= Pej Vahdat =

American actor (born 1982)

- Born: Pejman Vahdat; April 10, 1982 (age 44); San Jose, California, U.S.
- Education: San Diego State University
- Occupation: Actor
- Years active: 2004–present

Pejman "Pej" Vahdat (/ˈpɛdʒ vəˈdɑːt/ PEJ və-DAHT) is an American actor known for his role as Arastoo Vaziri in Bones from 2009 to 2017.

== Early life ==
Vahdat was born in San Jose, California, during the Iranian revolution to Nina Emami and Dr. Amoo, one of the Shah of Iran's physicians. Vahdat has a sister, Parastoo Emami, a parenting coach, and a brother, Paiman.

While he was a baby, his family moved to Germany for eight months before moving to San Jose, California.

Acting was not his first career path. Vahdat originally aimed to be a professional tennis player. Vahdat attended San Diego State University, where he was a member of the San Diego State Aztecs men's tennis team.

== Career ==
Before playing in Bones, Vahdat appeared in numerous television shows including House, The Unit, Arrested Development, and Lie to Me.

Early in his acting career, Vahdat often auditioned for stereotypical Middle Eastern roles, such as terrorists, store owners, or taxi drivers. He found it frustrating that these limited portrayals were the majority of what was available to actors like him. Things changed for Vahdat when he landed the role of Arastoo Vaziri on Bones in 2009. He was proud to play a brilliant Muslim scientist helping to solve crimes instead of committing them, which he saw as a meaningful challenge to typical Hollywood depictions of Muslims.

The Bones character of Arastoo Vaziri is an Iranian intern working alongside forensic anthropologists. Initially portrayed with an Iranian accent, Vaziri is later revealed to actually have an American accent, a twist that surprised both the audience and Vahdat himself. This choice was intended to challenge stereotypes and offer a more nuanced portrayal of Middle Eastern characters on television. On the show, Vaziri becomes romantically involved with his boss, Dr. Camille Saroyan, played by Tamara Taylor—another development that Vahdat didn't anticipate. The show ended in 2017.

In 2010, he played Kash, a store owner, during the first season of the Showtime series Shameless.

In 2016, Vahdat joined the Amazon drama series Sneaky Pete in a recurring role alongside Giovanni Ribisi. Vahdat played Raj Kumar Mukherjee, an educated man who enjoys gambling and frequently participates in high-stakes card games at secret events hosted by a character named Vince.

Between 2018 and 2020, Vahdat had a recurring role on Fox's Empire as Kelly Patel, a millionaire and the empire owner.

In 2022, Vahdat was cast as Dex Dexter, a charming and a fund manager in the fifth season of the CW reboot series Dynasty.

Between 2022 and 2024, Vahdat appeared as the young Faraz Hamzad, a powerful and ruthless Afghan warlord hell-bent on seeking revenge, also played by Navid Negahban, in the FX series The Old Man.

In 2025, Vahdat joined the cast of Tracker, season 2, on CBS in the recurring role of Leonard Sharf, a powerful and demanding client of Reenie Greene (Fiona Rene).

He also starred in the comedy Pickleheads and appeared in the one episode of the second season of Peacock's Poker Face.

== Personal life ==
In 2003, Vahdat started dating Narsis Attar, a medical doctor and Heme-Onc fellow at Dana Farber and MGH Cancer Center.

Vahdat is an Iranian-American Muslim who was born in the United States. The Trump administration's travel ban targeting several Muslim-majority countries, including Iran, hit home for him and in 2017 pushed him to speak out. Though not usually political, he began using his Twitter account to express his views and raise awareness.

== Filmography ==
=== Films ===
Year	Title	Role	Notes
2006	The Butcher	Chip	
2008	A Separate Tribe	Stranger	Short film
2008	Juan Frances: Live	Amir	
2010	Groupie	Clerk	
2013	Blood Shot	Ruhmeo	
2014	A Girl Walks Home Alone at Night	DJ Porno	
2018	Hope Springs Eternal	Mr. Garner	
2019	The Day Shall Come	Nura	

=== Television ===
Year	Title	Role	Notes	Ref.
2004	Finding the Endzone	Bobby	TV short	
2005	The Flight That Fought Back	Ziad Jarrah	Television film	
2005	Sleeper Cell	David	Episode: "Al-Faitha"	
2005–2009	General Hospital	Kia / Dr. Dylan Litz	2 episodes	
2006	Arrested Development	Iraqi Guard	Episode: "Exit Strategy"	
2006	Windfall	Cop / Tony Larma	Episode: "Priceless"	
2006	NCIS	Dead Motorcyclist Balash Sassnio	Episode: "Shalom"	
2006	Everybody Hates Chris	Dr. with Leg	Episode: "Everybody Hates Kris"	
2006–2007	Mind of Mencia	Henchman / Ravi	3 episodes	
2007	House	Hamid	Episode: "Airborne"	
2008	Valentine	Sameer Patel	Episode: "Daddy's Home"	
2008	The Unit	Zafar Khalid	Episode: "Inquisition"	
2008	Caught in the Action	Ahmad	Television film	
2009	Lie to Me	Jason Kashani	Episode: "Life Is Priceless"	
2009–2017	Bones	Arastoo Vaziri	Recurring role, 31 episodes	
2010	Hawthorne	Salim Amara	Episode: "Final Curtain"	
2011	NCIS: Los Angeles	Rameesh Nayam-Singh	Episode: "Tin Soldiers"	
2011	Grey's Anatomy	Tarik Amin	Episode: "This Is How We Do It"	
2011–2012	Shameless	Kash	8 episodes	
2012	Harry's Law	Alden Mills	Episode: "And the Band Played On"	
2012	Single Ladies	Kaseem	Episode: "Finally"	
2013	Hot in Cleveland	Ravi	Episode: "Cleveland Indians"	
2014	The Mysteries of Laura	Kasib Al Wazir	Episode: "The Mystery of the Dysfunctional Dynasty"	
2014	Dallas	Nasir Ali	3 episodes	
2015	Perception	Vice Consul Rashid Prasad	Episode: "Mirror"	
2016	Sneaky Pete	Raj Kumar Mukherjee	5 episodes	
2017	Lucifer	Josh Hamid	Episode: "They're Back, Aren't They?"	
2017	The Good Doctor	Dr. Avi Mehta	Episode: "Intangibles"	
2017–2018	Arrow	Sam Armand	4 episodes	
2018–2020	Empire	Kelly Patel	13 episodes	
2018	NCIS	Nigel Hakim	2 episodes	
2018	Elementary	Tim Darsha	Episode: “You’ve Come A Long Way, Baby”	
2022	Dynasty	Dex Dexter	Recurring role, 10 episodes	
2022	City on a Hill	Agent Ramin Milani	6 episodes	
2022–2024	The Old Man	Young Faraz Hamzad	Recurring role, 7 episodes	
2023	The Rookie: Feds	Ridwan Al Nassar	Episode: "Red One"	
2025	Tracker	Leonard Sharf	Recurring role (Season 2), 3 episodes	
2025	Poker Face	Abdul	Episode: "A New Lease on Death"	
2025	Eyes of Wakanda	Lion Guard #2 (voice)	Episode: "Into the Lion's Den"	
2026	R.J. Decker	Remington Aubrey	Episode: "Twenty Pounds of Clem in a Ten-Pound Bag"	
2026	Daredevil: Born Again	Doctor Arash Merati	2 episodes	

=== Video Games ===
Year	Title	Role	Notes
2019	Crackdown 3	Reza Khan	voice acting
2023	Dead Space Remake	Dr. Terrence Kyne	Facial, motion capture & voice acting
2025	Date Everything!	Amir	voice acting
