= Tyler Jacob Moore =

American actor (born 1982)

- Born: Catlin, Illinois, U.S.
- Occupation: Actor
- Years active: 2005–present
- Parents: Cynthia Donnell (mother); James Moore (father)
- Website: TylerJacobMoore.com

Tyler Jacob Moore is an American actor.

== Early life ==
Tyler was born and raised in Catlin, Illinois, to Cynthia Donnell and James Moore. He studied musical theater and acting at Palm Beach Atlantic University in West Palm Beach, Florida, and Howard Fine Acting Studio in Los Angeles. Before his days as a professional actor, he served in an Army reconnaissance platoon. Previous to that, some of his various jobs included: construction on log cabins, youth outreach, and working for Bunge North America (filling rail cars with grain being sent as foreign aid to various third world countries).

== Career ==
He plays Tony Markovich in the Showtime dramedy Shameless.

He is also known for his portrayal of Pastor John Tudor on GCB.

In July 2014, it was announced that Moore would play Prince Hans on the ABC show Once Upon a Time and made his debut appearance in the third episode of season 4.

== Filmography ==
Year	Title	Role
2005	The Ranch	John Reeves
2007	12 Miles of Bad Road	
2007	The Unit	Soldier
2007	Ghost Whisperer	Tyler
2008	NCIS: Naval Criminal Investigative Service	Richie Rose
2008	An American Carol	Marty
2009	Private Practice	Duke
2009	Rules of Engagement	Evan
2009	NCIS: Los Angeles	Marine LCPL. Brandon Valdivia
2009	Mr. Sadman	Jon
2010	Criminal Minds	Brad
2010	CSI: NY	U.S. Marine
2011	Love's Everlasting Courage	Ben
2011–2016	Shameless	Tony Markovich
2012	Slumber Party Slaughter	Zach
2012	GCB	Pastor John Tudor
2012	Drop Dead Diva	Dan Abraham
2012	Necessary Roughness	Ty Hassen
2013	Emily Owens, M.D.	Jared
2014	Revenge	Brian Hosko
2014	Don't Look Back	Jack Tresler
2014	Naughty & Nice	Cole
2014	Once Upon a Time	Prince Hans
2016	Hitting the Breaks	Ashley
2017	Pray for Rain	Crash Murphy
2018	Barry	Ryan Madison
2019	Front Seat Chronicles	Jason
2019	The Village	Deacon
2020	Grey's Anatomy	Dane Pinetti
2020	The Stand at Paxton County	Matt Hudson
2020	The Right Stuff	Bud Jennings
2020	Wheels of Fortune	Tommy
2021	Magnum P.I.	Jack Wheeler
2022	SEAL Team	Major Gerretsen
2023	Chicago Fire	Nathan Carver
2023	Ride	Gus Booker
2025	Paradise	Ryan Noble
2025	Monster: The Ed Gein Story	Sheriff Schley
