= List of Shameless (American TV series) episodes =

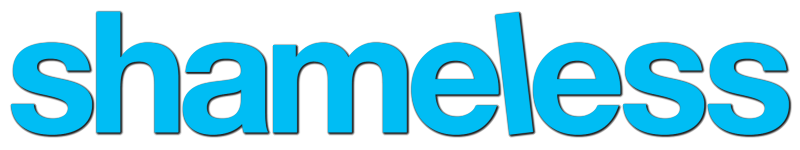

Shameless is an American television comedy-drama series which premiered on Showtime on January 9, 2011. Created by Paul Abbott, the series was developed for American television by John Wells and based upon the British series of the same name. HBO began developing an American version of Shameless after striking a deal with John Wells in January 2009. By October 2009, development moved to Showtime. John Wells Productions filmed a pilot episode for the cable network in December 2009.

In January 2020, the series was renewed for an eleventh and final season, which premiered on December 6, 2020. On December 14, 2020, Showtime announced six-episodes in clip show format to air during season 11 called Shameless Hall of Shame with new and original Shameless scenes juxtaposed with a retrospective look at each character's journey during the prior 10 seasons.

During the course of the series, 134 episodes of Shameless aired over eleven seasons, concluding on April 11, 2021.

== Series overview ==
Season	Episodes	Originally released	
Season	Episodes	First released	Last released
1	12	January 9, 2011	March 27, 2011
2	12	January 8, 2012	April 1, 2012
3	12	January 13, 2013	April 7, 2013
4	12	January 12, 2014	April 6, 2014
5	12	January 11, 2015	April 5, 2015
6	12	January 10, 2016	April 3, 2016
7	12	October 2, 2016	December 18, 2016
8	12	November 5, 2017	January 28, 2018
9	14	September 9, 2018	March 10, 2019
10	12	November 10, 2019	January 26, 2020
11	12	December 6, 2020	April 11, 2021

== Episodes ==
=== Season 1 (2011) ===
No. overall	No. in season	Title	Directed by	Written by	Original release date	Prod. code	US viewers (millions)
1	1	"Pilot"	Mark Mylod	Teleplay by : Paul Abbott and John Wells; British Episode by: Paul Abbott	January 9, 2011	296769	0.98
2	2	"Frank the Plank"	John Wells	Teleplay by : Paul Abbott and John Wells; British Episode by: Paul Abbott	January 16, 2011	2J5402	0.81
3	3	"Aunt Ginger"	Stephen Hopkins	Nancy M. Pimental	January 23, 2011	2J5403	0.90
4	4	"Casey Casden"	Todd Holland	Teleplay by : and Television Story by: Cindy Caponera; British Episode by: Paul Abbott	January 30, 2011	2J5404	1.11
5	5	"Three Boys"	Mimi Leder	Teleplay by : Alex Borstein; British Episode by: Danny Brocklehurst	February 6, 2011	2J5405	0.95
6	6	"Killer Carl"	John Dahl	Mike O'Malley	February 13, 2011	2J5406	1.01
7	7	"Frank Gallagher: Loving Husband, Devoted Father"	David Nutter	Etan Frankel	February 20, 2011	2J5407	1.14
8	8	"It's Time to Kill the Turtle"	Scott Frank	Nathan Jackson and Nancy M. Pimental	February 27, 2011	2J5408	0.92
9	9	"But at Last Came a Knock"	Mark Mylod	Teleplay by : Alex Borstein; British Episode by: Paul Abbott	March 6, 2011	2J5409	1.14
10	10	"Nana Gallagher Had an Affair"	Adam Bernstein	Teleplay by : and Television Story by: Cindy Caponera; British Episode by: Paul Abbott	March 13, 2011	2J5410	1.12
11	11	"Daddyz Girl"	Sanaa Hamri	Nancy M. Pimental	March 20, 2011	2J5411	1.10
12	12	"Father Frank, Full of Grace"	Mark Mylod	John Wells	March 27, 2011	2J5412	1.16

=== Season 2 (2012) ===
No. overall	No. in season	Title	Directed by	Written by	Original release date	Prod. code	US viewers (millions)
13	1	"Summertime"	Mark Mylod	John Wells	January 8, 2012	2J5951	1.58
14	2	"Summer Loving"	John Wells	Mike O'Malley	January 15, 2012	2J5952	1.25
15	3	"I'll Light a Candle for You Every Day"	Craig Zisk	Nancy M. Pimental	January 22, 2012	2J5953	1.28
16	4	"A Beautiful Mess"	Mark Mylod	Alex Borstein	January 29, 2012	2J5954	1.37
17	5	"Father's Day"	Anthony Hemingway	Etan Frankel	February 5, 2012	2J5955	1.01
18	6	"Can I Have a Mother"	John Dahl	William H. Macy & Steven Schachter	February 12, 2012	2J5956	1.44
19	7	"A Bottle of Jean Nate"	David Nutter	Nancy M. Pimental	February 19, 2012	2J5957	1.41
20	8	"Parenthood"	Daisy von Scherler Mayer	Mike O'Malley	March 4, 2012	2J5958	1.60
21	9	"Hurricane Monica"	Alex Graves	Alex Borstein	March 11, 2012	2J5959	1.31
22	10	"A Great Cause"	Mimi Leder	Etan Frankel	March 18, 2012	2J5960	1.16
23	11	"Just Like the Pilgrims Intended"	Mark Mylod	Story by : LaToya Morgan & Nancy M. Pimental; Teleplay by : Nancy M. Pimental	March 25, 2012	2J5961	1.51
24	12	"Fiona Interrupted"	John Wells	John Wells	April 1, 2012	2J5962	1.45

=== Season 3 (2013) ===
No. overall	No. in season	Title	Directed by	Written by	Original release date	Prod. code	US viewers (millions)
25	1	"El Gran Cañon"	Mark Mylod	John Wells	January 13, 2013	2J6601	2.00
26	2	"The American Dream"	Anthony Hemingway	Nancy M. Pimental	January 20, 2013	2J6602	1.37
27	3	"May I Trim Your Hedges?"	Steve Shill	Krista Vernoff	January 27, 2013	2J6603	1.99
28	4	"The Helpful Gallaghers"	Randall Einhorn	Mike O'Malley	February 10, 2013	2J6604	1.53
29	5	"The Sins of My Caretaker"	J. Michael Muro	Sheila Callaghan	February 17, 2013	2J6605	1.31
30	6	"Cascading Failures"	Anthony Hemingway	Alex Borstein	February 24, 2013	2J6606	1.48
31	7	"A Long Way From Home"	Mimi Leder	Etan Frankel	March 3, 2013	2J6607	1.76
32	8	"Where There's a Will"	Danny Cannon	Davey Holmes	March 10, 2013	2J6608	1.66
33	9	"Frank the Plumber"	Mark Mylod	Krista Vernoff	March 17, 2013	2J6609	1.67
34	10	"Civil Wrongs"	Gary B. Goldman	Mike O'Malley	March 24, 2013	2J6610	1.61
35	11	"Order Room Service"	Sanaa Hamri	Sheila Callaghan	March 31, 2013	2J6611	1.65
36	12	"Survival of the Fittest"	Mark Mylod	Etan Frankel & Nancy M. Pimental	April 7, 2013	2J6612	1.82

=== Season 4 (2014) ===
No. overall	No. in season	Title	Directed by	Written by	Original release date	US viewers (millions)
37	1	"Simple Pleasures"	John Wells	John Wells	January 12, 2014	1.69
38	2	"My Oldest Daughter"	Mimi Leder	Nancy M. Pimental	January 19, 2014	1.60
39	3	"Like Father, Like Daughter"	Sanaa Hamri	Sheila Callaghan	January 26, 2014	1.83
40	4	"Strangers on a Train"	Peter Segal	Etan Frankel	February 2, 2014	1.22
41	5	"There's the Rub"	David Nutter	Davey Holmes	February 9, 2014	1.58
42	6	"Iron City"	James Ponsoldt	John Wells	February 16, 2014	1.90
43	7	"A Jailbird, Invalid, Martyr, Cutter, Retard and Parasitic Twin"	Gary B. Goldman	Nancy M. Pimental	February 23, 2014	1.89
44	8	"Hope Springs Paternal"	Mimi Leder	Sheila Callaghan	March 9, 2014	1.77
45	9	"The Legend of Bonnie and Carl"	Mark Mylod	Etan Frankel	March 16, 2014	1.70
46	10	"Liver, I Hardly Know Her"	Christopher Chulack	Davey Holmes	March 23, 2014	1.63
47	11	"Emily"	Anthony Hemingway	Nancy M. Pimental	March 30, 2014	1.76
48	12	"Lazarus"	Mark Mylod	John Wells	April 6, 2014	1.93

=== Season 5 (2015) ===
No. overall	No. in season	Title	Directed by	Written by	Original release date	US viewers (millions)
49	1	"Milk of the Gods"	Christopher Chulack	Nancy M. Pimental	January 11, 2015	1.77
50	2	"I'm the Liver"	Sanaa Hamri	Krista Vernoff	January 18, 2015	1.76
51	3	"The Two Lisas"	Peter Segal	Sheila Callaghan	January 25, 2015	1.96
52	4	"A Night to Remem... Wait, What?"	Richie Keen	Davey Holmes	February 1, 2015	1.26
53	5	"Rite of Passage"	Alex Graves	Etan Frankel	February 8, 2015	1.64
54	6	"Crazy Love"	Anthony Hemingway	John Wells	February 15, 2015	1.26
55	7	"Tell Me You Fucking Need Me"	William H. Macy	Nancy M. Pimental	March 1, 2015	1.44
56	8	"Uncle Carl"	Wendey Stanzler	Krista Vernoff	March 8, 2015	1.60
57	9	"Carl's First Sentencing"	Christopher Chulack	Etan Frankel	March 15, 2015	1.62
58	10	"South Side Rules"	Michael Uppendahl	Sheila Callaghan	March 22, 2015	1.67
59	11	"Drugs Actually"	Mimi Leder	Davey Holmes	March 29, 2015	1.43
60	12	"Love Songs (In the Key of Gallagher)"	Christopher Chulack	John Wells	April 5, 2015	1.55

=== Season 6 (2016) ===
No. overall	No. in season	Title	Directed by	Written by	Original release date	US viewers (millions)
61	1	"I Only Miss Her When I'm Breathing"	Christopher Chulack	John Wells	January 1, 2016 (online); January 10, 2016 (Showtime)	1.44
62	2	"#AbortionRules"	Iain B. MacDonald	Nancy M. Pimental	January 17, 2016	1.64
63	3	"The F Word"	Nisha Ganatra	Krista Vernoff	January 24, 2016	1.70
64	4	"Going Once, Going Twice"	Christopher Chulack	Davey Holmes	January 31, 2016	1.70
65	5	"Refugees"	Wendey Stanzler	Etan Frankel	February 7, 2016	1.16
66	6	"NSFW"	Jake Schreier	Sheila Callaghan	February 14, 2016	1.60
67	7	"Pimp's Paradise"	Peter Segal	Dominique Morisseau	February 21, 2016	1.66
68	8	"Be a Good Boy. Come For Grandma."	Iain B. MacDonald	Nancy M. Pimental	March 6, 2016	1.50
69	9	"A Yurt of One's Own"	Ruben Garcia	Davey Holmes	March 13, 2016	1.68
70	10	"Paradise Lost"	Lynn Shelton	Etan Frankel	March 20, 2016	1.60
71	11	"Sleep No More"	Anthony Hemingway	Sheila Callaghan	March 27, 2016	1.45
72	12	"Familia Supra Gallegorious Omnia!"	Christopher Chulack	John Wells	April 3, 2016	1.63

=== Season 7 (2016) ===
No. overall	No. in season	Title	Directed by	Written by	Original release date	US viewers (millions)
73	1	"Hiraeth"	Christopher Chulack	John Wells	September 23, 2016 (online); October 2, 2016 (Showtime)	1.24
74	2	"Swipe, Fuck, Leave"	Rob Hardy	Nancy M. Pimental	October 9, 2016	1.11
75	3	"Home Sweet Homeless Shelter"	Iain B. MacDonald	Krista Vernoff	October 16, 2016	1.44
76	4	"I Am a Storm"	Emmy Rossum	Sheila Callaghan	October 23, 2016	1.38
77	5	"Own Your Shit"	Christopher Chulack	Dominique Morisseau	October 30, 2016	1.20
78	6	"The Defenestration of Frank"	David Nutter	Etan Frankel	November 6, 2016	1.44
79	7	"You'll Never Ever Get a Chicken in Your Whole Entire Life"	John Wells	Nancy M. Pimental	November 13, 2016	1.33
80	8	"You Sold Me the Laundromat, Remember?"	Allison Liddi-Brown	Krista Vernoff	November 20, 2016	1.40
81	9	"Ouroboros"	Christopher Chulack	Sheila Callaghan	November 27, 2016	1.56
82	10	"Ride or Die"	Zetna Fuentes	Dominique Morisseau	December 4, 2016	1.60
83	11	"Happily Ever After"	John M. Valerio	Etan Frankel	December 11, 2016	1.58
84	12	"Requiem for a Slut"	John Wells	John Wells	December 18, 2016	1.72

=== Season 8 (2017–18) ===
No. overall	No. in season	Title	Directed by	Written by	Original release date	U.S. viewers (millions)
85	1	"We Become What We... Frank!"	Iain B. MacDonald	John Wells	November 5, 2017	1.86
86	2	"Where's My Meth?"	Anthony Hemingway	Nancy M. Pimental	November 12, 2017	1.37
87	3	"God Bless Her Rotting Soul"	Michael Morris	Krista Vernoff	November 19, 2017	1.34
88	4	"Fuck Paying It Forward"	Regina King	Dominique Morisseau	November 26, 2017	1.59
89	5	"The (Mis)Education of Liam Fergus Beircheart Gallagher"	Iain B. MacDonald	Sheila Callaghan	December 3, 2017	1.51
90	6	"Icarus Fell and Rusty Ate Him"	Zetna Fuentes	Mark Steilen	December 10, 2017	1.52
91	7	"Occupy Fiona"	Iain B. MacDonald	Molly Smith Metzler	December 17, 2017	1.58
92	8	"Frank's Northern Southern Express"	Emmy Rossum	Nancy M. Pimental	December 31, 2017	0.81
93	9	"The Fugees"	Jeffrey Reiner	Dominique Morisseau	January 7, 2018	1.65
94	10	"Church of Gay Jesus"	Anna Mastro	Sheila Callaghan	January 14, 2018	1.52
95	11	"A Gallagher Pedicure"	Iain B. MacDonald	Mark Steilen	January 21, 2018	1.52
96	12	"Sleepwalking"	John Wells	John Wells	January 28, 2018	1.73

=== Season 9 (2018–19) ===
No. overall	No. in season	Title	Directed by	Written by	Original release date	U.S. viewers (millions)
97	1	"Are You There Shim? It's Me, Ian"	Iain B. MacDonald	Nancy M. Pimental	September 9, 2018	1.31
98	2	"Mo White!"	Erin Feeley	Molly Smith Metzler	September 16, 2018	1.12
99	3	"Weirdo Gallagher Vortex"	Kat Coiro	Joe Lawson	September 23, 2018	1.05
100	4	"Do Right, Vote White!"	Mark Mylod	John Wells	September 30, 2018	1.09
101	5	"Black-Haired Ginger"	William H. Macy	Philip Buiser	October 7, 2018	1.00
102	6	"Face It, You're Gorgeous"	Allison Liddi-Brown	Nancy M. Pimental	October 14, 2018	0.92
103	7	"Down Like the Titanic"	Silver Tree	Molly Smith Metzler	October 21, 2018	1.00
104	8	"The Apple Doesn't Fall Far from the Alibi"	Zetna Fuentes	Joe Lawson	January 20, 2019	0.80
105	9	"BOOOOOOOOOOOONE!"	Loren Yaconelli	Philip Buiser	January 27, 2019	0.84
106	10	"Los Diablos!"	Roberto Sneider	Nancy M. Pimental	February 10, 2019	1.14
107	11	"The Hobo Games"	Iain B. MacDonald	Molly Smith Metzler	February 17, 2019	0.97
108	12	"You'll Know the Bottom When You Hit It"	Shari Springer Berman & Robert Pulcini	Joe Lawson	February 24, 2019	0.81
109	13	"Lost"	Iain B. MacDonald	John Wells	March 3, 2019	1.13
110	14	"Found"	John Wells	John Wells	March 10, 2019	1.35

=== Season 10 (2019–20) ===
No. overall	No. in season	Title	Directed by	Written by	Original release date	U.S. viewers (millions)
111	1	"We Few, We Lucky Few, We Band of Gallaghers!"	John Wells	John Wells	November 10, 2019	0.76
112	2	"Sleep Well My Prince for Tomorrow You Shall Be King"	Jennifer Arnold	Nancy M. Pimental	November 17, 2019	0.91
113	3	"Which America?"	Silver Tree	Molly Smith Metzler	November 24, 2019	0.84
114	4	"A Little Gallagher Goes a Long Way"	Iain B. MacDonald	Joe Lawson	December 1, 2019	0.87
115	5	"Sparky"	William H. Macy	Philip Buiser	December 8, 2019	0.83
116	6	"Adios Gringos"	Loren Yaconelli	Sherman Payne	December 15, 2019	0.89
117	7	"Citizen Carl"	Erin Feeley	Nancy M. Pimental	December 22, 2019	0.84
118	8	"Debbie Might Be a Prostitute"	Rose Troche	Molly Smith Metzler	December 29, 2019	0.86
119	9	"O Captain, My Captain"	Anthony Hardwick	Philip Buiser	January 5, 2020	0.77
120	10	"Now Leaving Illinois"	Kevin Bray	Sherman Payne	January 12, 2020	0.89
121	11	"Location, Location, Location"	Silver Tree	Joe Lawson	January 19, 2020	0.81
122	12	"Gallavich!"	John Wells	John Wells	January 26, 2020	0.92

=== Season 11 (2020–21) ===
No. overall	No. in season	Title	Directed by	Written by	Original release date	U.S. viewers (millions)
123	1	"This Is Chicago!"	Iain B. MacDonald	John Wells	December 6, 2020	0.70
124	2	"Go Home, Gentrifier!"	Silver Tree	Nancy M. Pimental	December 13, 2020	0.69
125	3	"Frances Francis Franny Frank"	Jude Weng	Philip Buiser	December 20, 2020	0.62
126	4	"NIMBY"	Iain B. MacDonald	Sherman Payne	January 10, 2021	0.57
127	5	"Slaughter"	Daniella Eisman	Joe Lawson	January 31, 2021	0.57
128	6	"Do Not Go Gentle Into That Good....Eh, Screw It"	Iain B. MacDonald	Corina Maritescu	February 14, 2021	0.52
129	7	"Two at a Biker Bar, One in the Lake"	Satya Bhabha	Philip Buiser	March 7, 2021	0.41
130	8	"Cancelled"	Shanola Hampton	Sherman Payne	March 14, 2021	0.55
131	9	"Survivors"	Iain B. MacDonald	Joe Lawson	March 21, 2021	0.48
132	10	"DNR"	Anthony Hardwick	Corina Martescu	March 28, 2021	0.59
133	11	"The Fickle Lady is Calling it Quits"	Iain B. MacDonald	Nancy M. Pimental	April 4, 2021	0.52
134	12	"Father Frank, Full of Grace"	Christopher Chulack	John Wells	April 11, 2021	0.70

== Specials ==
=== Shameless Hall of Shame (2020–21) ===
No.	Title	Directed by	Written by	Original release date	U.S. viewers (millions)
1	"Ian & Mickey: Daddy Issues"	Iain B. MacDonald	Nancy M. Pimental	December 27, 2020	0.43
When it's learned that Ned has died, Ian and Mickey come to terms about their dynamic as a married couple.
2	"Kev & V: God Doesn't Give with Both Hands"	Iain B. MacDonald	Nancy M. Pimental	January 3, 2021	0.42
When it's learned that Gemma is flunking out of online school, Kevin and Veronica are forced to face their fears of their parenting to help Gemma.
3	"Lip: Once Upon a Phillip Gallagher"	Iain B. MacDonald	Nancy M. Pimental	January 17, 2021	0.40
When Fred gets ill, Lip tells him a story about his life.
6	"Debbie, Carl & Liam: They Grow Up So Fast"	Iain B. MacDonald	Elyssa Gershman	January 24, 2021	0.40
When Liam's girlfriend breaks up with him due to his family's background, Debbie and Carl join forces to help Liam win her back, while also trying to figure out their own conflicts as sibilings.
5	"Fiona: Go Fiona On Them"	Iain B. MacDonald	Nancy M. Pimental	February 21, 2021	0.35
When Fiona becomes a contestant of a reality dating show, the Gallaghers and Kevin and Veronica give stories about the real Fiona Gallgher.
6	"Frank: Ghosts of Gallagher Past"	Iain B. MacDonald	Nancy M. Pimental	February 28, 2021	0.29
After years of trying to beat the system, Frank is confront from his past, present and the future as his dementia begins to overtake him.

== Ratings ==
Shameless : U.S. viewers per episode (millions)

Season	Episode number														Average
Season	1	2	3	4	5	6	7	8	9	10	11	12	13	14	Average
1	0.98	0.81	0.90	1.11	0.95	1.01	1.14	0.92	1.14	1.12	1.10	1.16	–		1.03
2	1.58	1.25	1.28	1.37	1.01	1.44	1.41	1.60	1.31	1.16	1.51	1.45	–		1.36
3	2.00	1.37	1.99	1.53	1.31	1.48	1.76	1.66	1.67	1.61	1.65	1.82	–		1.65
4	1.69	1.60	1.83	1.22	1.58	1.90	1.89	1.77	1.70	1.63	1.76	1.93	–		1.71
5	1.77	1.76	1.96	1.26	1.64	1.26	1.44	1.60	1.62	1.67	1.43	1.55	–		1.58
6	1.44	1.64	1.70	1.70	1.16	1.60	1.66	1.50	1.68	1.60	1.45	1.63	–		1.56
7	1.24	1.11	1.44	1.38	1.20	1.44	1.33	1.40	1.56	1.60	1.58	1.72	–		1.42
8	1.86	1.37	1.34	1.59	1.51	1.52	1.58	0.81	1.65	1.52	1.52	1.73	–		1.50
9	1.31	1.12	1.05	1.09	1.00	0.92	1.00	0.80	0.84	1.14	0.97	0.81	1.13	1.35	1.04
10	0.76	0.91	0.84	0.87	0.83	0.89	0.84	0.86	0.77	0.89	0.81	0.92	–		0.85
11	0.70	0.69	0.62	0.57	0.57	0.52	0.41	0.55	1.09	0.59	0.52	0.70	–		0.58

Audience measurement performed by Nielsen Media Research
