= Shameless season 11 =

Shameless
- Season 11
- Promotional poster
- Showrunner: John Wells
- Starring: William H. Macy; Jeremy Allen White; Ethan Cutkosky; Shanola Hampton; Steve Howey; Emma Kenney; Cameron Monaghan; Noel Fisher; Christian Isaiah; Kate Miner
- No. of episodes: 12

Release
- Original network: Showtime
- Original release: December 6, 2020 – April 11, 2021

Season chronology
- ← Previous; Season 10

The eleventh and final season of Shameless, an American comedy-drama television series based on the British series of the same name by Paul Abbott, premiered on Showtime on December 6, 2020. Showtime announced the series' final season renewal on January 13, 2020.

== Plot ==
After a decade of chaos, the Gallaghers are used to the struggle, but when serious and dire economic struggles brought on by the COVID-19 pandemic hit them, it leads to life-altering changes not only to their personal lives, but their professional lives as well that finds themselves considering leaving the South Side and maybe even Chicago.

== Cast and characters ==
=== Main ===
- William H. Macy as Frank Gallagher
- Jeremy Allen White as Philip "Lip" Gallagher
- Ethan Cutkosky as Carl Gallagher
- Shanola Hampton as Veronica Fisher
- Steve Howey as Kevin "Kev" Ball
- Emma Kenney as Deborah "Debbie" Gallagher
- Cameron Monaghan as Ian Gallagher
- Noel Fisher as Mickey Milkovich
- Christian Isaiah as Liam Gallagher
- Kate Miner as Tami Tamietti

=== Recurring ===
- Paris Newton as Franny Gallagher
- Brooklyn Regans as Gemma
- London Regans as Amy
- Michael Patrick McGill as Tommy
- Jim Hoffmaster as Kermit
- Elise Eberle as Sandy Milkovich
- Joshua Malina as Arthur Tipping
- Toks Olagundoye as Leesie Janes
- Scott Michael Campbell as Brad
- Dennis Cockrum as Terry Milkovich
- Orson Ford as Timmy Milkovich
- Steve Luna as Joey Milkovich
- Jesse Saler as Sammy Milkovich
- Chelsea Alden as Tish
- Paula Andrea Placido as Calista
- Vanessa Bell Calloway as Carol Fisher
- Kimleigh Smith as Sgt. Stamps
- Patrick Sabongui as Martin
- Shakira Barrera as Heidi Cronch

=== Guest ===
- Gary Busey as Frank's Father (Hall of Shame)
- Dan Lauria as Maurice "Mo" White (Hall of Shame)
- Melissa Paladino as Cami Tamietti
- Lou Taylor Pucci as Lou Milkovich
- Tara Buck as Letty
- James Earl as Detective Hightower
- David Clayton Rogers as Detective Young
- Richard Portnow as Johnny Boxcars
- Virginia Kull as Nancy Lamper
- Crystal Coney as Claire Arnett

== Episodes ==
No. overall	No. in season	Title	Directed by	Written by	Original release date	U.S. viewers (millions)
123	1	"This Is Chicago!"	Iain B. MacDonald	John Wells	December 6, 2020	0.70
Gentrification starts to affect Chicago due to the effects of the COVID-19 pandemic which leads Kevin and Veronica to turn a profit by selling illegal hash brownies. Frank teams up with a documentary director to give a look back on the history of the South Side. Lip and Tami are dealing with the financial effects of the pandemic as they continue working on house renovations. Debbie faces hardship in landing jobs, as she is now on the sex offender registry; she is disgusted to discover that the registry has mislabelled her as molesting a seven-year-old. Carl is training in the police academy to become an officer, earning the respect of his superiors. Ian is angered to discover that Mickey had used some of their wedding savings to buy stuff, as Ian had intended to save enough money to buy a house for themselves.
124	2	"Go Home, Gentrifier!"	Silver Tree	Nancy M. Pimental	December 13, 2020	0.69
Carl begins his first day as a police officer but is disappointed when he is paired with Arthur, who has a lazy and non-aggressive personality. While having sex with a woman, Arthur has a heart attack and is taken away in an ambulance. Ian forces Mickey to get a job, declaring he will not have sex with him until he finds one. To get money, Mickey steals expired items and sells them, leading to him making more money than Ian. Kevin and Veronica partner with Frank in a business venture, wherein Frank can get them marijuana from his contact. Lip and Tami's house gets vandalized by their neighbors, who explain that their renovations will lead to an increase in rent and taxes in the neighborhood. Debbie goes shopping for Franny's princess-themed fifth birthday party but goes overboard, later admitting to Sandy that she wanted the party for herself, as she never had a proper birthday party as a child.
125	3	"Frances Francis Franny Frank"	Jude Weng	Philip Buiser	December 20, 2020	0.62
After a change in sex positions, Ian and Mickey argue about their relationship dynamics. Tami and Lip console Brad and Cami when their baby experiences severe health problems, and Tami pushes Lip to pay for the surgery. Kevin starts to splurge with his new business venture, but ends up with his new car stolen; Mickey offers himself to make sure Kevin's shipments are delivered on time. Carl gets a new partner, Officer Janes, who is more concerned with street justice, even using police brutality to get a criminal to testify. Debbie hurriedly leaves the house for work, leaving Liam to take Franny to school. Liam allows Frank to take Franny, and the two decide to spend the day together when Frank takes her to the wrong school. Later, Debbie scolds Frank and reprimands Liam for abandoning Franny. The family defends Liam, and Lip calls Debbie a bad mother for failing to prioritize Franny.
126	4	"NIMBY"	Iain B. MacDonald	Sherman Payne	January 10, 2021	0.57
Mickey and the Gallaghers get a rude surprise when Terry and his and neo-nazi family move in next door. Frank tries to get rid of the Milkovich family by infiltrating their house, but fails. Veronica and Debbie try to sabotage each others' children at the annual Little Ms. South Side banquet; neither Franny or Gemma end up winning. Tami and Lip are invited to go to brunch with her old music teacher, but Lip is shocked to find out that Tami used to date him. While busting a house suspected of selling drugs, Carl starts to evaluate his role as a police officer when Officer Janes wants to plant drugs to arrest everyone in the house. Mickey tries to get Ian to join him in his new security gig, but Ian is reluctant due to the risk of him and Mickey violating parole. They buy military gear to transport the marijuana instead; the supplier is impressed by their backgrounds and offers them a job as security heads.
127	5	"Slaughter"	Daniella Eisman	Joe Lawson	January 31, 2021	0.57
Lip and Tami find out their house is for sale; Lip realizes that is not the legitimate owner of the house, as he never signed any papers, and he and Tami begin house hunting. Debbie begins to grow suspicious about Sandy's whereabouts; she discovers that Sandy is living in her car, and that her husband has been trying to reach her. Carl and Officer Janes respond to a shoplifting call; Carl chases the kid and states he will protect him if he stops robbing. Lip is fired from the bike shop after complaining about his salary. Veronica starts canvassing Black constituents to vote for a rent control bill, only to find out for herself how scarce black people are in this new gentrified Chicago. Ian and Mickey rethink their business plan after getting robbed by gunmen. Frank forms a rally to get the Milkoviches evicted. Angered by the rally's noise, Liam goes outside with a gun and shoots it in the air; the bullet falls back and hits Terry in the head.
128	6	"Do Not Go Gentle Into That Good....Eh, Screw It"	Iain B. MacDonald	Corina Maritescu	February 14, 2021	0.52
Terry returns from the hospital, now paralyzed and in a wheelchair; Carl advises Liam to hide the gun. Angered by the years of trauma and abuse, Mickey holds a weapon against Terry's chest, but cannot bring himself to pull the trigger. Debbie and Sandy reconcile. Lip attempts to provide for Tami and Fred by stealing equipment from the bike shop with Brad and Mickey, causing Tami to confront him. Carl has sex with furniture store clerk Tish, but she does not allow him to use a condom. Veronica becomes class parent of the day at Amy and Gemma's school, but is horrified by the school shooting drills. While picking up marijuana, Frank is punched and taken to the hospital; the nurse runs additional tests after noticing Frank's speech pattern. The family is shocked when Lip and Tami announce they are considering selling the Gallagher home to pay for their own house. Frank discovers that he has been diagnosed with alcoholic dementia.
129	7	"Two at a Biker Bar, One in the Lake"	Satya Bhabha	Philip Buiser	March 7, 2021	0.41
After a fight with Debbie, Ian and Mickey begin searching for more gay friends. Kevin agrees to keep Lip and Brad's stolen bikes at his space, but later disposes of the bikes after being pulled over by a police officer, infuriating Lip and Brad. Sandy's ex-husband returns and reveals to Debbie that Sandy has a son; Debbie scolds Sandy for abandoning her child. Frank tries to use his diagnosis to his benefit, but realizes that his situation is beyond his control as his dementia starts overcoming him; he enters different houses and forgets the Alibi's location. Veronica learns that Carol is leaving Chicago. Carl is paranoid that Tish tried to "baby trap" him, but Tish reveals she never meant any harm. Fed up with Lip's actions, Tami decides to move in with her father. Lip angrily smashes a wall in the Gallagher household to build an open floor and boost the house's value. Debbie is approached by two police officers looking for Lip.
130	8	"Cancelled"	Shanola Hampton	Sherman Payne	March 14, 2021	0.55
Lip gets interrogated by the police on his knowledge of the robbery and the whereabouts of the bikes. Veronica and Kevin decide to secure their relationship for good by officially getting married. Due to the Carl Curse, nobody wants to partner with him on the force, so the Chief puts him with the vice squad. Carl crashes their car when the detectives plan to investigate and frame the Alibi. Debbie spirals after fighting with Lip and Sandy, and after a day of partying, decides to break up with Sandy because of her abandonment of her son. Liam competes at his school to propose a new name; Frank agrees to participate, but suddenly forgets what he is going to do at the event. He is taken to the hospital, where the family learns about Frank's dementia. Ian and Mickey hire Sister Mary Luke as a new caretaker for Terry; they are content with her, until she later tells them she suffocated Terry to death.
131	9	"Survivors"	Iain B. MacDonald	Joe Lawson	March 21, 2021	0.48
Despite hating his father, Mickey is emotional over Terry's death, and they pay a visit to Terry's ex-girlfriend Rachel after discovering old pictures of the couple. After Rachel claims that Terry was a lovable person, Mickey visits his father's coffin and burns it down. While Veronica helps Carol in Kentucky, Kevin is left in charge of Amy and Gemma, who accidentally consume edibles. Frank tries to reconvene his old heist buddies for one more caper, but realizes that all of them are either dead, retired or disabled. Lip and Brad are forced to help out a major crime family. Carl gets relocated to the Eviction Unit with Arthur. Since no one has reassured him of where he will be living, Liam begins to search elsewhere for a home. Debbie admits to Lip that she did not want him to sell the house because she wanted Franny to live with her family. After Lip offers to set up family dinners, Debbie agrees to sell the house.
132	10	"DNR"	Anthony Hardwick	Corina Martescu	March 28, 2021	0.59
The entire Chicago police department is looking for the Nighthawks painting that Frank stole from the Art Institute of Chicago, which forces the Gallaghers to find a way out of his mess. Lip sells one of his bikes at a lower price in order to replace the houses' damaged pipes, while Debbie tries to look for a new place to stay after they sell the house. Kevin travels to Louisville to help Veronica and Carol. In the process, Kevin and Veronica both question their future in Chicago when she receives the chance to work for a local congressman in Louisville. Ian and Mickey find a cheap apartment in the West Side; Ian signs a lease despite Mickey's reluctance. Carl and the police department come to a head when he sees how badly they treat poor people. Liam and Frank discuss how Frank's diagnosis will affect the family, and Liam takes Frank to a tattoo shop, where Frank gets the words "do not resuscitate" tattooed in his chest.
133	11	"The Fickle Lady is Calling it Quits"	Iain B. MacDonald	Nancy M. Pimental	April 4, 2021	0.52
Ian and Mickey have different experiences in their new apartment in the West Side; Mickey dislikes the neighborhood's quiet state and decides to sleep at the Gallagher household. Kevin and Veronica sell their house and bar as they begin making plans to leave Chicago. Carl is demoted to a meter maid and runs into a pregnant Tish. After speaking with Tami, Debbie gets worried that Frank and Monica's bad parenting have made it impossible for her to find lasting love, and she angrily lambasts Frank. Debbie later runs into Heidi, a violent kleptomaniac recently released from prison. Lip begins a yard sale in order to bump the house's value. Liam and Frank spend the day doing "Frank things" to cheer him up as his dementia continues to worsen; Frank vomits the alcohol at the Alibi and realizes he will not be able to enjoy it anymore. At the end of the episode, Frank writes a letter for his family, injects himself with heroin, and passes out on the couch.
134	12	"Father Frank, Full of Grace"	Christopher Chulack	John Wells	April 11, 2021	0.70
The family discovers an unconscious Frank; unsure if he still is alive, they go back to their regular routines, unaware of his letter. Ian and Mickey question the possibility of having children; Mickey is worried he will become like Terry, but Ian reassures him he will not. Debbie and Heidi are in a relationship, and Heidi offers Debbie the chance to flee with her to El Paso. Carl learns about Heidi's criminal record, but does not inform his siblings. Tami reveals to Lip that she may be pregnant again. Lip gets a $75,000 offer from his neighbor to buy the Gallagher house, and he tells Ian about splitting the money among the siblings. After wandering through the city, Frank is taken to the hospital and mistakes his nurse for Fiona. He is diagnosed with COVID-19 and dies before the hospital is able to contact the Gallaghers. While the family celebrates at Kevin and Veronica's commemoration of the Alibi, Frank's spirit is seen entering the Alibi; he stares down at his family and narrates his letter, proclaiming his view and hopes for his children. He concludes by advising his children to have a good time, feeling he had it.

== Production ==
In January 2020, the series was renewed for its eleventh and final season to consist of 12 episodes and was scheduled to premiere in summer 2020. However, filming and the premiere date were pushed back due to the COVID-19 pandemic, and filming instead began in September 2020 and wrapped March 2021.

On December 14, 2020, Showtime announced a six-episode limited series retrospective that would air during season 11 called Shameless Hall of Shame; it contains new and original Shameless scenes juxtaposed with a retrospective look at each character's journey during the prior 10 seasons:

- Episode 1: Ian & Mickey: Daddy Issues (aired December 27, 2020)
- Episode 2: Kev & V: God Doesn't Give with Both Hands (aired January 3, 2021)
- Episode 3: Lip: Once Upon a Phillip Gallagher (aired January 17, 2021)
- Episode 4: Debbie, Carl & Liam: They Grow Up So Fast (aired January 24, 2021)
- Episode 5: Fiona: Go Fiona On Them (aired February 21, 2021)
- Episode 6: Frank: Ghosts of Gallagher Past (aired February 28, 2021)

== Reception ==
=== Critical response ===
The eleventh season of Shameless has received average reviews from critics. On Rotten Tomatoes, the season has a 70% approval rating with an average score of 5.10 out of 10 based on 10 reviews.

=== Ratings ===
Viewership and ratings per episode of Shameless season 11
No.	Title	Air date	Rating/share (18–49)	Viewers (millions)	DVR (18–49)	DVR viewers (millions)	Total (18–49)	Total viewers (millions)
1	"This is Chicago!"	December 6, 2020	0.1	0.70	0.2	TBD	0.3	TBD
2	"Go Home, Gentrifier!"	December 13, 2020	0.1	0.69	TBD	TBD	TBD	TBD
3	"Frances Francis Franny Frank"	December 20, 2020	0.1	0.62	TBD	TBD	TBD	TBD
4	"NIMBY"	January 10, 2021	0.1	0.57	TBD	TBD	TBD	TBD
5	"Slaughter"	January 31, 2021	0.2	0.57	TBD	TBD	TBD	TBD
6	"Do Not Go Gentle Into That Good....Eh, Screw It"	February 14, 2021	0.1	0.52	TBD	TBD	TBD	TBD
7	"Two at a Biker Bar, One in the Lake"	March 7, 2021	0.1	0.41	TBD	TBD	TBD	TBD
8	"Cancelled"	March 14, 2021	0.1	0.55	TBD	TBD	TBD	TBD
9	"Survivors"	March 21, 2021	0.1	0.48	TBD	TBD	TBD	TBD
10	"DNR"	March 28, 2021	0.1	0.59	TBD	TBD	TBD	TBD
11	"The Fickle Old Lady, Calls It Quits"	April 4, 2021	0.1	0.52	TBD	TBD	TBD	TBD
12	"Father Frank, Full of Grace"	April 11, 2021	0.2	0.70	TBD	TBD	TBD	TBD
