= Survivors (Shameless) =

- Shameless episode
- Episode no.: Season 11; Episode 9
- Directed by: Iain B. MacDonald
- Written by: Joe Lawson
- Cinematography by: Anthony Vietro
- Editing by: Nathan Allen
- Original release date: March 21, 2021
- Running time: 53 minutes

Guest appearances
- Joshua Malina as Arthur Tipping; Vanessa Bell Calloway as Carol Fisher; Scott Michael Campbell as Brad; Gina Hecht as Rachel; Richard Portnow as Johnny Boxcars; Henry G. Sanders as Jelly; Kimleigh Smith as Sgt. Stamps; Carol Mansell as Serena Teasley; Sam Morgan as Patrick; Jim Hoffmaster as Kermit; Georgia Leva as Robin; Philip Anthony-Rodriguez as Officer Dubois; Cesili Williams as Sunny; Jon Wellner as Charles

Episode chronology
← Previous "Cancelled"	Next → "DNR"
- Shameless season 11

"Survivors" is the ninth episode of the eleventh season of the American television comedy drama Shameless, an adaptation of the British series of the same name. It is the 131st overall episode of the series and was written by executive producer Joe Lawson, and directed by executive producer Iain B. MacDonald. It originally aired on Showtime on March 21, 2021.

The series is set on the South Side of Chicago, Illinois, and depicts the poor, dysfunctional family of Frank Gallagher, a neglectful single father of six: Fiona, Phillip, Ian, Debbie, Carl, and Liam. He spends his days drunk, high, or in search of money, while his children need to learn to take care of themselves. The family's status is shaken after Fiona chooses to leave. In the episode, tensions between Debbie and Lip begin to grow as he wants still sell the house. Meanwhile, Frank prepares to pull off a heist, while Ian and Mickey discover Terry's past.

According to Nielsen Media Research, the episode was seen by an estimated 0.48 million household viewers and gained a 0.10 ratings share among adults aged 18–49. The episode received mixed reviews from critics, who criticized the lack of progress in the storylines.

== Plot ==
Lip and Debbie continue fighting over selling the house. During this, Frank realizes the implications of the sale, and decides to get the money to buy the house himself. He proceeds to retrieve items from the attic, revealing he plans to rob the Art Institute of Chicago.

Despite hating his father, Mickey cries over his death. As he and Ian check his belongings, they discover pictures of him with a woman named Rachel. They visit Rachel (Gina Hecht), who claims Terry was a lovable person, to the point that he was willing to convert to Hasidic Judaism to marry her when her father forced him. Despite Terry's determination, he could not learn Hebrew and he could not marry her, and Rachel wonders if he is responsible for her father's death. Afterwards, Mickey visits his father's coffin and burns it down. While Veronica leaves to help Carol in moving to Kentucky, Kevin is left with Amy and Gemma, but they prove to be difficult to control, especially when they consume edibles.

After his "accident" with the Vice squad, Carl gets relocated to the Eviction Unit. He is surprised when his partner is Arthur, who has recovered from his heart attack. He is taken aback by his new personality, and how he decides to call a SWAT team to evict a tenant. As Lip and Brad visit the shop to sign papers, they are surprised when it is revealed that the new owner is involved with the Baggio crime family. They are subsequently kidnapped by the boss (Al Pugliese), although he only wants them to fix an electric car. When he returns home, Lip discovers that Debbie has boarded up the house after taking an STD test. Debbie finally reveals her problem with selling the house: she wanted Franny to live with her family. Lip finally understands, and states he can set up family dinners, and Debbie finally agrees to sell the house.

Liam (Christian Isaiah) tries to find a new home when it is clear no one will take him in. He applies for foster homes, but he is not allowed to apply. He offers to help Frank in his heist, but he does not believe will be able to do the job. Subsequently, he explains his situation to Lip, who agrees to take him to live with him and Tami. Frank contacts his old crew to team up for the heist, but each one will not be able to help; one is in a nursing home, one is content with his life, and the other has died. With no other options, Frank is forced to do the heist alone. Later, Ian and Debbie are shocked to discover that Frank managed to steal the painting Nighthawks, putting it in their living room.

== Production ==
=== Development ===
The episode was written by executive producer Joe Lawson, and directed by executive producer Iain B. MacDonald. It was Lawson's seventh writing credit, and MacDonald's 15th directing credit.

== Reception ==
=== Viewers ===
In its original American broadcast, "Survivors" was seen by an estimated 0.48 million household viewers with a 0.10 in the 18–49 demographics. This means that 0.10 percent of all households with televisions watched the episode. This was a 13% decrease in viewership from the previous episode, which was seen by an estimated 0.55 million household viewers with a 0.14 in the 18–49 demographics.

=== Critical reviews ===
"Survivors" received mixed reviews from critics. Myles McNutt of The A.V. Club gave the episode a "C+" grade and wrote, "With the issue of the house apparently settled, we're at the point where each character will now need to find their space within the new normal. I don't know if I'd say that “Survivors” did much to tap into the natural momentum of the season's final act, but admittedly the simple proximity to the end tends to make me more invested in what's happening even if it isn't necessarily earned, which is making this stretch of the series dull if not necessarily tortuous."

Daniel Kurland of Den of Geek gave the episode a 3.5 star rating out of 5 and wrote "“Survivors” is a confident step forward for Shameless. It figures out how to balance the series' more tender sensibilities with the wackier antics that were more prominent during the show's earliest seasons. Characters operate as functional units and finally listen to each other before they're left with fractured relationships that no longer feel like a family." Mads Misasi of Telltale TV gave the episode a 2 star rating out of 5 and wrote "Things get a little confusing on Shameless Season 11 Episode 9, “Survivors.” While this show has had some continuity errors in the past, there are a few during “Survivors” that make no sense."

Paul Dailly of TV Fanatic gave the episode a 2 star rating out of 5 and wrote "While "Survivors" started moving some of the plots along toward a conclusion, there was too much filler that made it difficult to care about any of the events." Meaghan Darwish of TV Insider wrote "There are only a few more episodes left before Shameless wraps up the story of the Gallagher family, and no time is being wasted as we approach the finish line."
