= The Fickle Lady is Calling it Quits =

- Shameless episode
- Episode no.: Season 11; Episode 11
- Directed by: Iain B. MacDonald
- Written by: Nancy M. Pimental
- Cinematography by: Anthony Hardwick
- Editing by: Chetin Chabuk
- Original release date: April 4, 2021
- Running time: 54 minutes

Guest appearances
- Joshua Malina as Arthur Tipping; Chelsea Alden as Tish; Shakira Barrera as Heidi Cronch; Erin Chambers as Melanie Runkin; Ashwin Gore as Alan; Amanda Payton as Flavia; Patrick Sabongui as Martin; Kimleigh Smith as Sgt. Stamps; Jim Hoffmaster as Kermit; Michael Patrick McGill as Tommy; Charlet Takahashi Chung as Jill; Christian Gehring as Jamie; Cloie Wyatt Taylor as Samantha; Sean Whalen as Lester

Episode chronology
← Previous "DNR"	Next → "Father Frank, Full of Grace"
- Shameless season 11

"The Fickle Lady is Calling it Quits" is the eleventh episode of the eleventh season of the American television comedy drama Shameless, an adaptation of the British series of the same name. It is the 133rd overall episode of the series and was written by executive producer Nancy M. Pimental, and directed by executive producer Iain B. MacDonald. It originally aired on Showtime on April 4, 2021.

The series is set on the South Side of Chicago, Illinois, and depicts the poor, dysfunctional family of Frank Gallagher, a neglectful single father of six: Fiona, Phillip, Ian, Debbie, Carl, and Liam. He spends his days drunk, high, or in search of money, while his children need to learn to take care of themselves. The family's status is shaken after Fiona chooses to leave. In the episode, Liam and Frank spend the day doing "Frank things"; as his dementia continues to worsen. Meanwhile, Lip begins a yard sale in order to bump the house's value, while Mickey hates his new apartment.

According to Nielsen Media Research, the episode was seen by an estimated 0.52 million household viewers and gained a 0.11 ratings share among adults aged 18–49. The episode received mixed reviews from critics; while William H. Macy received high praise for his performance, others criticized the different storylines.

== Plot ==
Ian and Mickey have moved into their apartment at West Side, but Mickey dislikes the neighborhood's quiet state, so he decides to sleep at the Gallagher household. He tries to cover the window with black trash bags, but the building manager tells him he can only use white curtains.

Kevin and Veronica sell their house for $175,000 to a developer, planning to move to Louisville. Lip contacts the developer over buying the house, and he secures a $275,000 deal. However, the developer tells Lip that he decided to buy another house for a lower price, $200,000, which was a figure that Lip initially refused. Carl is forced by Sergeant Stamps to apologize to the wealthy man for the "assault incident." Carl reluctantly agrees, but takes back his apology when the man makes a racist remark towards Stamps. Carl insults the man, proclaiming he will fight people like him. As the man threatens with legal action, Carl is demoted to parking enforcement with Arthur. During this, Carl runs into Tish, who is pregnant. When Carl asks over the father, Tish does not answer.

Debbie laments her failed attempts in relationships, and asks Kevin, Veronica and Tami over any explanation. While Kevin and Veronica do not say anything, Tami simply says her bad parents have stalled her attempts. Upset, she brutally kicks Frank at the Alibi, blaming him for ruining her love life. Somewhere, Heidi, a violent kleptomaniac, is released from prison. She steals a woman's car and robs her mother. Heidi is forced to hug Debbie at gunpoint when she notices the police looking for her, but Debbie mistakes this for a sign. While Ian bonds with his new neighbors, Mickey is frustrated that they are not given furniture for their apartment. He tries to steal chairs from the pool, but Ian stops, causing an angry Mickey to leave back for the Gallagher household. They reconcile, promising to make more changes at their new apartment.

Seeing Frank's dementia worsen, Liam decides to take him outside so they can do "Frank things" to cheer him up. These include scamming as blind people, having sex with a prostitute and drinking at the Alibi. However, Frank vomits the alcohol, realizing that he will not be able to enjoy it anymore. He returns home, running into Lip renovating the kitchen. They exchange a conversation, where Frank believes Lip was looking for a brick of gold they hid together, revealing they buried it in the backyard when Lip was twelve. That night, an alone Frank writes a letter for his family, and proceeds to inject himself with heroin. He passes out in the couch.

== Production ==
=== Development ===
The episode was written by executive producer Nancy M. Pimental, and directed by executive producer Iain B. MacDonald. It was Pimental's 26th writing credit, and MacDonald's 16th directing credit.

== Reception ==
=== Viewers ===
In its original American broadcast, "The Fickle Lady is Calling it Quits" was seen by an estimated 0.52 million household viewers with a 0.11 in the 18–49 demographics. This means that 0.11 percent of all households with televisions watched the episode. This was a 12% decrease in viewership from the previous episode, which was seen by an estimated 0.59 million household viewers with a 0.14 in the 18–49 demographics.

=== Critical reviews ===
"The Fickle Lady is Calling it Quits" received mixed reviews from critics. Myles McNutt of The A.V. Club gave the episode a "D+" grade and wrote, "It's a decision consistent with the show's unwillingness to decenter its most destructive character long past the point Frank was dragging down the rest of the show, and thus a decision that combines with everything else to inspire little but dread for how exactly, after more than five years of thinking about it, John Wells and his writers believe the story of the Gallagher family should come to an end."

Daniel Kurland of Den of Geek gave the episode a 3.5 star rating out of 5 and wrote "“The Fickle Lady Is Calling It Quits” is the strongest episode of Shameless' final season, it contains some of William H. Macy's absolute best work from the show, and it instills some optimistic confidence for what the series has planned for its final installment." Mads Misasi of Telltale TV gave the episode a 2.5 star rating out of 5 and wrote "While Shameless Season 11 Episode 11, “The Fickle Lady is Calling it Quits,” does give fans the Ian and Mickey focus we have always wanted, it still fails to really do anything of consequence with their storyline. Honestly, the only really important part of the episode comes in the final 10 minutes or so."

Paul Dailly of TV Fanatic gave the episode a 3 star rating out of 5 and wrote "As a penultimate episode, I expected much more because I'm at a loss how the series can wrap up in a satisfying way with one episode remaining." Meaghan Darwish of TV Insider wrote "Shameless's penultimate episode sees a family struggling to come to terms with life-changing issues."
