= Shakira Barrera =

American actress (born 1990)

- Born: March 7, 1990 (age 36); Englewood, New Jersey, U.S.
- Occupation: Actress
- Years active: 2008–present

Shakira Barrera (born 1990) is an American actress. She joined the cast of the Netflix series GLOW in its second season.

== Biography ==
Barrera was born in Englewood, New Jersey, to Nicaraguan-American parents and attended the Bergen County Academies. Barrera earned a Bachelor of Fine Arts at Rutgers University, where she studied dance.

In 2018, Barrera was added to the cast of the television series GLOW. Her character, Yolanda, is a former stripper who joins the cast when an original wrestler leaves.

Barrera makes monthly donations to, and has organized fund-raising events for, a charity that helps disabled people in Nicaragua.

== Filmography ==
=== Film ===
Film roles
Year	Title	Role	Notes
2013	New Prey	Coco	Short film
2015	Superfast!	Sofia	
2017	Wack: The Misadventures of an Awkward Teenage Boy	Chelsea	Short film
2017	Blood Heist	Guady	
2017	Electric Room	Shakira	Short film
2018	Abuela's Luck	Yesenia	Short film
2018	Armed	KC	
2018	A Boxer's Fight	Marissa Perez	Short film
2019	Kaya	Kaya	Short film
2019	Deb	Gabby	Short film
2020	Remember When	Elisa	Short film
2021	Collection	Christina	
2025	Hurricanna	DHS Agent	

=== Television ===
Television roles
Year	Title	Role	Notes
2014	Sketch Juice	Shakira	Episode: "Slipped Up"
2014	Grey's Anatomy	Young Mom	Episode: "We Gotta Get Out of This Place"
2014–2015	Freak Out	Herself	Main cast
2014–2016	Faking It	Vashti Nadira	Recurring
2016	Rosewood	Ananda 'Andi' Singh	Episode: "Paralytics and Priorities"
2016	East Los High	Kris	2 episodes
2016	Bizaardvark	Britt Pickles	Episode: "Puff and Frankie"
2016	Those Who Can't	Inze	Episode: "8 Mile High"
2017	uncool	Duke	Episode: "Free Pizza"
2017	High & Mighty	Angie	6 episodes
2018	Lethal Weapon	Nina Delillo	Episode: "Leo Gets Hitched"
2018	Queen of the South	Young Camila	Episode: "Diez de Copas"
2018	Three Rivers	Lucy	TV Pilot
2018–2019	GLOW	Yolanda "Junkchain" Rivas	Recurring
2019	It's Bruno!	Lulu	Main cast
2020	Agents of S.H.I.E.L.D.	Agent King	Episode: "Adapt or Die"
2021	Animal Kingdom	Cassandra	Episode: "Splinter"
2021	Shameless	Heidi Cronch	3 episodes: "This Is Chicago!" (uncredited); "The Fickle Lady is Calling it Quits"; "Father Frank, Full of Grace"
2022	Sprung	Gloria	9 episodes
2023	Ahsoka	First Officer Jensen Corbyt	Episode: "Part One: Master and Apprentice"
2024	Hacks	Meena Elahi	Episode: "Yes, And"
2025	Watson	Hazel Kett	Episode: "The Dark Day Deduction"
2025	Ironheart	Roz Blood	6 episodes
