= NIMBY (Shameless) =

- Shameless episode
- Episode no.: Season 11; Episode 4
- Directed by: Iain B. MacDonald
- Written by: Sherman Payne
- Cinematography by: Anthony Hardwick
- Editing by: Nathan Allen
- Original release date: January 10, 2021
- Running time: 57 minutes

Guest appearances
- Toks Olagundoye as Leesie Janes; Romeo Brown as Brother Malik; Dennis Cockrum as Terry Milkovich; Elise Eberle as Sandy Milkovich; Kris D. Lofton as Solo; Valarie Rae Miller as Judge Ilene; Phillip Rhys as Marcos Hanisian; Roxy Wood as Miss June; Karl T. Wright as Alderman Jenkins

Episode chronology
← Previous "Frances Francis Franny Frank"	Next → "Slaughter"
- Shameless season 11

"NIMBY" is the fourth episode of the eleventh season of the American television comedy drama Shameless, an adaptation of the British series of the same name. It is the 126th overall episode of the series and was written by co-producer Sherman Payne, and directed by Iain B. MacDonald. It originally aired on Showtime on January 10, 2021.

The series is set on the South Side of Chicago, Illinois, and depicts the poor, dysfunctional family of Frank Gallagher, a neglectful single father of six: Fiona, Phillip, Ian, Debbie, Carl, and Liam. He spends his days drunk, high, or in search of money, while his children need to learn to take care of themselves. The family's status is shaken after Fiona chooses to leave. In the episode, the Gallaghers are taken aback when the Milkovich family moves next door. Meanwhile, Carl questions his new partner, while Lip discovers a secret about Tami's past.

According to Nielsen Media Research, the episode was seen by an estimated 0.57 million household viewers and gained a 0.14 ratings share among adults aged 18–49. The episode received mixed reviews from critics, who criticized the writing and character motivations.

== Plot ==
The Gallaghers are shocked to discover that Terry and his neo-Nazi family has moved next door, as Terry has bribed the 90-year-old owner with sex. Frank intends to get rid of the Milkovich family, but only Kevin and Liam accept to help him, as the rest do not believe they will ever leave.

Debbie takes Franny (Paris Rose Newton) to the Little Miss South Side contest. However, Veronica has also taken Gemma to compete, causing friction between both. They try to sabotage each other behind the stage, and then deliver speeches where they reveal the other's criminal records. Eventually, neither Franny or Gemma win, as the judges declare a Syrian girl with Spina Bifida as the winner. Nevertheless, Alderman Jenkins is impressed by Veronica's speech, and offers her a job at his staff. Lip accompanies Tami have lunch with her former teacher, Marcos Hanisian. Lip is worried over their dynamics, and is shocked when Tami reveals she used to date him. Tami defends her decision, until Marcos visits their house with his 17-year-old fiancé.

Mickey convinces Ian to join him in securing the marijuana for Kevin and Veronica. Ian is worried that Mickey wants to use illegal methods for the job, and worries that they might violate their parole. Instead, they buy military gear to transport the marijuana. There, the supplier is impressed by their backgrounds, and offers them a job as security heads at the organization, where they would each receive $1,000 per day. Carl and Janes respond to a loitering complaint, confronting the suspicious Miss June (Roxy Wood). When she tries to bribe them with cigarettes, Janes becomes aggressive and forces her to give up her belongings. Later, they bust a house suspected of selling drugs, and Carl runs into an old criminal friend, Solo. Janes wants to plant drugs, but Carl convinces her in just arresting two people at the house. That night, a guilty Carl returns the belongings to Miss June, suggesting her to use a different route.

After failing to convince people to attack the Milkovich family, Frank decides that they must infiltrate the house and get a confession out of the landlord. As Kevin distracts the Milkovich at their porch, Frank and Liam sneak through the backdoor, and Liam enters the house, finding the landlord in bed. He records her with his phone to get a confession that calls out Terry, but she instead gloats that they have good sex. That night, they are further annoyed when more Milkovich family members arrive and camp in the empty lot next to their house, causing even more noise.

== Production ==
=== Development ===
The episode was written by co-producer Sherman Payne, and directed by Iain B. MacDonald. It was Payne's third writing credit, and MacDonald's 12th directing credit.

== Reception ==
=== Viewers ===
In its original American broadcast, "NIMBY" was seen by an estimated 0.57 million household viewers with a 0.14 in the 18–49 demographics. This means that 0.14 percent of all households with televisions watched the episode. This was a slight decrease in viewership from the previous episode, which was seen by an estimated 0.62 million household viewers with a 0.13 in the 18–49 demographics.

=== Critical reviews ===
"NIMBY" received mixed reviews from critics. Myles McNutt of The A.V. Club gave the episode a "B–" grade and wrote, "“Nimby” isn't offensive by any means, but it's not cohering into something that feels befitting of a final season, and it's increasingly obvious that expecting Shameless to achieve this is a burden the writers do not share."

Daniel Kurland of Den of Geek gave the episode a 2.5 star rating out of 5 and wrote "“NIMBY” has a lot of smaller moments that are easy to enjoy and Carl's storyline remains enjoyable the entire. However, it's still an episode that succumbs to the larger problems of this season where low impact plots make so much of this material feel disposable. It's starting to feel like the gears are turning and that there's bigger stuff ahead, particularly with Frank, but as it stands it hasn't been the challenging return that Shameless needs to go out on top." Mads Misasi of Telltale TV gave the episode a 3.5 star rating out of 5 and wrote "It's bad enough when the neighborhood has Frank and his troubles to deal with, but now on Shameless Season 11 Episode 4, “NIMBY,” the Milkoviches have moved in. As Frank so aptly points out, the Gallaghers are bad enough, but at least they aren't as low as the Milkoviches."

Paul Dailly of TV Fanatic gave the episode a 1.5 star rating out of 5 and wrote ""Nimby" was Shameless at its worst. The characters were arguing over petty stuff, and it made it clear as day that we're limping toward the finish line." Meaghan Darwish of TV Insider wrote "After delivering the money to the supplier, an employee mentions that if they make runs for them, Mickey and Ian could make as much as $1,000 a day, but is it a deal too good to be true? Only time will tell."
