= Do Not Go Gentle Into That Good....Eh, Screw It =

- Shameless episode
- Episode no.: Season 11; Episode 6
- Directed by: Iain B. MacDonald
- Written by: Corina Maritescu
- Cinematography by: Anthony Hardwick
- Editing by: Michael S. Stern
- Original release date: February 14, 2021
- Running time: 57 minutes

Guest appearances
- Chelsea Alden as Tish; Martha Boles as Ellen; Tara Buck as Letty; Scott Michael Campbell as Brad; Dennis Cockrum as Terry Milkovich; Elise Eberle as Sandy Milkovich; Paula Andrea Placido as Calista; Lisa Waltz as Mrs. Sugar

Episode chronology
← Previous "Slaughter"	Next → "Two at a Biker Bar, One in the Lake"
- Shameless season 11

"Do Not Go Gentle Into That Good....Eh, Screw It" is the sixth episode of the eleventh season of the American television comedy drama Shameless, an adaptation of the British series of the same name. It is the 128th overall episode of the series and was written by Corina Maritescu, and directed by executive producer Iain B. MacDonald. It originally aired on Showtime on February 14, 2021.

The series is set on the South Side of Chicago, Illinois, and depicts the poor, dysfunctional family of Frank Gallagher, a neglectful single father of six: Fiona, Phillip, Ian, Debbie, Carl, and Liam. He spends his days drunk, high, or in search of money, while his children need to learn to take care of themselves. The family's status is shaken after Fiona chooses to leave. In the episode, Terry returns from the hospital, and Mickey wonders what to do with him. Meanwhile, Frank receives bad news, and Lip tries to figure out how to provide for Tami and Fred.

According to Nielsen Media Research, the episode was seen by an estimated 0.52 million household viewers and gained a 0.09 ratings share among adults aged 18–49. The episode received mostly positive reviews from critics, who praised the emotional tone and performances, particularly William H. Macy and Noel Fisher.

== Plot ==
At night, Lip, Brad and Mickey sneak into the shop, stealing equipment and $3,000 from the owners' office. However, Mickey is frustrated that neither Lip or Brad have a contingent plan on where to sell the parts without being traced. They are forced to hide the equipment at the Keg Zone after Kevin agrees to cover for them.

Terry returns from the hospital, now paralyzed and forced to use a wheelchair. Due to his disgusting nature, his family refuses to let him enter the house and just leave him in the sidewalk. When Mickey walks by, he expresses his anger towards Terry and holds a weapon against his chest, but cannot bring himself to pull the trigger. Subsequently, he and Ian help Terry reach his house's porch, but leave him outside as the door is locked. Liam is haunted by his role in Terry's condition after learning he was responsible for the bullet. As he asks others for help in penance, he finally admits his actions to Carl . While Carl is proud of his brother's actions, he tells him to hide the gun.

Frank has sex with a woman named Letty, but he constantly calls her "Monica". While picking up marijuana, he is punched and taken to the hospital. Noticing his speech pattern, the nurse asks him a few questions. When Frank cannot recall three words she told him, she decides to run a few more tests on him. Later, Frank runs into Terry at the porch, who asks him to kill him, but Frank refuses. Tami discovers about the robbery and confronts Lip about it. He opens up about how he is always negatively impacted no matter what decision he takes, but accepts that he cannot become a criminal for his family. Veronica accompanies Amy and Gemma to school after being selected as class parent of the day. However, she is horrified when the school runs a school shooting simulation. Unwilling to let it become the norm, she contacts Alderman Jenkins to stop the protocol and provide the students with more equipment.

Debbie gets a new job at a lesbian bar, and confronts Sandy over her marriage. Sandy reveals she was married at 15, but regrets her decision, and they reconcile. At a furniture store, Carl defends the clerk, Tish, from an aggressive customer and they go on a date. That night, Tish visits him at home and they proceed to have sex. Carl wants to use condom, but Tish does not allow him. Afterwards, he talks over the situation with the family, and Debbie says he was raped. The following day, he files a sexual assault charge. Lip and Tami visit the family at their house and reveal that in order to pay for their own house, they are considering selling the Gallagher household. The announcement is criticized and leads to a huge argument. Frank steps outside and reads a letter with the medical results; he has been diagnosed with alcoholic dementia.

== Production ==
=== Development ===
The episode was written by Corina Maritescu, and directed by executive producer Iain B. MacDonald. It was Maritescu's first writing credit, and MacDonald's 14th directing credit.

== Reception ==
=== Viewers ===
In its original American broadcast, "Do Not Go Gentle Into That Good....Eh, Screw It" was seen by an estimated 0.52 million household viewers with a 0.09 in the 18–49 demographics. This means that 0.09 percent of all households with televisions watched the episode. This was a slight decrease in viewership from the previous episode, which was seen by an estimated 0.57 million household viewers with a 0.15 in the 18–49 demographics.

=== Critical reviews ===
"Do Not Go Gentle Into That Good....Eh, Screw It" received mostly positive reviews from critics. Myles McNutt of The A.V. Club gave the episode a "B" grade and wrote, "'Do Not Go Gentle Into That Good…Eh, Screw It' is the most compelling episode of Shameless so far this season because these developments have real stakes. These stakes don't magically solve the show's long-term problems, of course. [...] But the very existence of something — anything — that feels grounded in reality and the past ten years we've spent with these characters is so welcome that I'm willing to look past all that."

Daniel Kurland of Den of Geek wrote "'Do Not Go Gentle Into That Good...Eh, Screw It' provides the clarity that this season has otherwise lacked and this hopefully means that the final batch of episodes will be just as focused and reflect the higher level of quality that Shameless is capable of achieving. There's definitely the potential for what's to come to devolve into sappy and saccharine storytelling, but this greater sense of urgency will hopefully aid these final episodes. Shameless is often needlessly vulgar and juvenile, but there's also a real sensitivity to the program and it's the right approach for these final episodes to begin to embrace that."

Mads Misasi of Telltale TV gave the episode a 3.5 star rating out of 5 and wrote "For fans of Mickey Milkovich, Shameless Season 11 Episode 6, 'Do Not Go Gentle Into That Good…Eh, Screw It' is one of the best episodes to show his emotional range. For other fans, this episode probably falls somewhere in the middle with a moment that goes way too far and brings down the whole vibe of the episode." Meaghan Darwish of TV Insider wrote "Shameless is taking some serious turns in its final season as the Gallaghers gear up for the next chapters of their lives."

=== Accolades ===
TVLine named Noel Fisher as an honorable mention for the "Performer of the Week" for the week of February 20, 2021, for his performance in the episode. The site wrote, "As far as fathers go, Shameless' Mickey definitely does not have the best one in his homophobic dad — but their tumultuous relationship did give way to one of Noel Fisher's best scenes ever in Sunday's episode. When his father Terry ended up relying a wheelchair and abandoned on the front lawn of his home, Mickey grabbed his gun and stomped over to take care of his old man once and for all. But as he pointed the weapon at Terry's chest, Fisher's expression started to shift from anger to something far more emotionally complex, his eyes filling with unshed tears. However, even years of abuse and pent-up feelings about what his father put him through couldn't make Mickey pull the trigger. Mickey proved himself to be the better man, and Fisher proved that even after 11 seasons, he can still bring impressive new depths to his character."
