= Father Frank, Full of Grace (Shameless season 11) =

- Shameless episode
- Episode no.: Season 11; Episode 12
- Directed by: Christopher Chulack
- Written by: John Wells
- Cinematography by: Anthony Hardwick
- Editing by: Nathan Allen
- Original release date: April 11, 2021
- Running time: 60 minutes

Guest appearances
- Joshua Malina as Arthur Tipping; Shakira Barrera as Heidi Cronch; Scott Michael Campbell as Brad; Winifred Freeman as Dot; Christopher Guyton as Shelby; Jim Hoffmaster as Kermit; Virginia Kull as Nancy Lamper; Sophia Macy as Sophia; Madison Mason as Father Bud; Michael Patrick McGill as Tommy; JT Neal as Stephen; Christian Zuber as Mansoor

Episode chronology
← Previous "The Fickle Lady is Calling it Quits"	Next → —
- Shameless season 11

"Father Frank, Full of Grace" is the series finale of the American television comedy drama Shameless, an adaptation of the British series of the same name. It is the twelfth episode of the eleventh season, the final episode and the 134th overall episode of the series. The episode was written by series developer John Wells, and directed by Christopher Chulack. It originally aired on Showtime on April 11, 2021.

The series is set on the South Side of Chicago, Illinois, and depicts the poor, dysfunctional family of Frank Gallagher, a neglectful single father of six: Fiona, Phillip, Ian, Debbie, Carl, and Liam. He spends his days drunk, high, or in search of money, while his children need to learn to take care of themselves. The series followed the family's journey as they tried to improve their lives, especially after Fiona leaves the house and Frank's dementia diagnosis. In the series finale, the family debates what to do with Frank's deteriorating health, while also looking forward to the future. The episode shares the same title as the first-season finale.

According to Nielsen Media Research, the episode was seen by an estimated 0.70 million household viewers and gained a 0.18 ratings share among adults aged 18–49. The episode received mixed-to-negative reviews from critics; many criticized the unresolved storylines, and some considered that the series had run its course. Despite that, William H. Macy received a nomination for Outstanding Lead Actor in a Comedy Series at the 73rd Primetime Emmy Awards.

== Plot ==
The family checks on an unconscious Frank, finding that he used all of his heroin to inject himself. While his pulse is not heard, they are still unsure if he is still alive. They proceed to go back to their lives, unaware of the letter that Frank left for them.

As Lip wonders what to do after failing to sell the house, Tami tells him she might be pregnant again. While Brad offers to give him a job at a mechanic shop, Lip is forced to take on a job as a food delivery man. Despite arriving in time, the customers do not tip him much. He helps one of his customers in making money, but he still gets paid just $20, so Lip vandalizes his car. Before leaving for Louisville, Kevin and Veronica throw a celebration night to commemorate the Alibi, although Kevin is worried that the new buyers will dismantle the bar. Ian and Mickey plan to attend, and both question the possibility of having children. Mickey is worried he might become like Terry, but Ian reassures him he will not.

Debbie is now in a relationship with Heidi, and helps her in stealing a new car. After selling the car, Heidi offers Debbie and Franny the chance to flee with her to El Paso, Texas. Carl grows attached to his job in the parking enforcement unit, massively charging wealthy people for using the handicap spots. Talking with Arthur, he learns about Heidi's criminal record, but does not tell Debbie or his family. Frank wanders through the city, finding a closed down Patsy's, and the church where Fiona and Sean were getting married. (Note: As depicted in "Familia Supra Gallegorious Omnia!".) He enters the church, and believing he is the altar boy, proceeds to light the candles. The father, seeing his condition, calls an ambulance.

Ian and Mickey arrive at the Alibi, with Ian expressing annoyance that Mickey forgot the day was their wedding anniversary. Mickey then shows him that the celebration is actually his wedding gift, delighting Ian. Lip gets a $75,000 offer from his neighbor to buy the Gallagher household, and he comments to Ian about splitting the money into the siblings. Ian supports his decision, but tells Lip he can have his own share. Liam looks for Frank in the city, and goes to the Alibi disappointed. Frank is taken to the hospital, where he mistakes his nurse (Sophia Macy) for Fiona. He is diagnosed with COVID-19, and they discover his do not resuscitate tattoo. They try to contact his family, but Frank dies before they can be called.

While the family celebrates at the Alibi, Franny (Paris Newton) finds Frank's letter at home and draws over it. Frank's spirit is seen entering the Alibi, where he is happy to see his family. When he is pronounced dead, his spirit starts lifting up to the sky while seated on a stool with beer. He stares down at his family, as everyone goes outside to laugh at a burned down car and start singing. Frank starts narrating his letter, proclaiming his view and hopes for his children. He concludes by saying they should not waste their time and have a good time, feeling he had it. He looks at the viewers and gives a cheers to them as a goodbye. In a mid-credits scene, two morgue workers take Frank's body and throw it in the crematorium. However, his high levels of alcohol causes his body to explode, while an urn to his name falls to the ground.

== Production ==
=== Development ===
In January 2020, Showtime confirmed that the eleventh season of the series would be its last. Gary Levine, President of Entertainment at Showtime Networks, said in a statement, "The characters of Shameless have brought Showtime viewers more laughs and tears and pure enjoyment than any program in our history. While we are sad to bid the Gallaghers farewell, we couldn't be more confident in the ability of showrunner John Wells, his writing team and this great cast to bring our series to its appropriately ‘Shameless’ conclusion."

The episode was written by series developer John Wells, and directed by Christopher Chulack. It was Wells' 24th writing credit, and Chulack's 11th directing credit.

=== Writing ===
John Wells and William H. Macy both concluded that Frank had to die. Wells said, "while we've had a lot of fun with Frank, to leave it with the impression that there's no consequences whatsoever for years of damaging behavior to his body between drugs and alcohol would be less than fair." On the decision to have Frank die by COVID, Wells said, "With all the comorbidity that Frank had, Bill and I both talked about it and said, “It would be unrealistic to not have anybody in this community actually suffer severe consequences of the pandemic.”" He also decided to not have the family react to his death by saying, "I really didn't want to play the more sentimental version of them having to react to his death. I like keeping it with the audience's imagination of who would react and how when they finally discover that he's gone."

Many of the storylines in the finale are left open-ended. Wells explained, "I always appreciate things not being wrapped up. We're so invested as writers and audience members in their lives that you want to fill in some blanks and not run the American Graffiti end crawl. It's fun in American Graffiti where you tell everyone what happens. I want to think what I want to think about the characters, where they end up and what happens with them and have the audience have those conversations with others over drinks. I think that's more fun, personally."

Wells and Emmy Rossum held conversations over having Fiona return for the series finale. However, due to the increase in COVID-19 lockdowns, they concluded that "it just didn't feel safe or practical for her to come back." Nevertheless, Wells was not fully convinced in bringing her back; he felt this could make the episode a very special episode, similar to some episodes in his other series, ER. He added, "A lot of times for the actors and the writers you go through a huge tearful goodbye and then you write them back and it's probably a little anti-climactic; it feels a little too beholden to what fans may want. So the timing just never worked out right, and it always felt strange to write too much of "Oh, hey, we got this letter from Fiona," or "Here's a postcard from Florida." It all seemed a little cheesy, so we didn't do it. I don't know if it's the right decision, to be honest." As the writers considered the idea, they joked over having the family get tired of Frank and send him to Florida, where Fiona was living.

== Reception ==
=== Viewers ===
In its original American broadcast, "Father Frank, Full of Grace" was seen by an estimated 0.70 million household viewers with a 0.18 in the 18–49 demographics. This means that 0.18 percent of all households with televisions watched the episode. This was a 34% increase in viewership from the previous episode, which was seen by an estimated 0.52 million household viewers with a 0.11 in the 18–49 demographics.

=== Critical reviews ===
"Father Frank, Full of Grace" received mixed-to-negative reviews from critics. Myles McNutt of The A.V. Club gave a largely negative review, criticizing the finale's lack of closure for the characters: "[The episode] resists the convergence of other narrative threads introduced throughout the season and throughout this finale. [...] Because Wells wants to freeze frame their lives, all of [their storylines] just stops without resolution, wasting any opportunity for it to say something meaningful about these characters and their journeys." Commenting on Frank's death, McNutt wrote, "Frank dying alone is the most thematically successful part of this finale, but it's also utterly meaningless given how much of a drain Frank has been on the show for at least half of its run, and thus it doesn't matter if it was a fitting end. A fitting end for Frank does not move Shameless any closer to delivering a satisfying conclusion."

Paul Dailly of TV Fanatic gave the episode a 2.5 star rating out of 5 and criticized the finale's lack of closure, writing "Saying goodbye to Shameless was always going to be tough, but I was oddly ready to end my time watching the Gallaghers by the end of [the finale]. For a series finale, the first half of the episode didn't feel like it brought much to a close. There wasn't much closure at all when you think about it." Meaghan Darwish of TV Insider expressed similar sentiments, writing "There's leaving things to the imagination and then there's providing absolutely no closure. It's clear this show went with the latter. [...] Sure, not every finale can have a satisfying conclusion, but they also don't need to leave already muddied waters even more unclear."

Allison Picurro of TV Guide criticized the open-ended tone of the finale, calling it "absolutely maddening", and expressed mixed feelings on the writers' handling of Frank's death: "Maybe on another show that hadn't already run Frank's character into the ground, it could've been a bittersweet moment, but Frank's passing just left me wondering why killing off this dead end (no pun intended) of a character took so long." Picurro ultimately concluded, "Series finales are tricky business since it's not often that fans actually agree with where its writers think things should end. Shameless isn't the first show to have a disappointing last episode, nor will it be the last, but after eleven years, it's hard to accept that this was the best they could do." Lindsay Press of Culturess wrote that the series finale "[failed] to reach the emotional climax of a true ending", and also criticized the lack of closure to the show's character arcs: "Shameless fails many of its other characters when it comes to their conclusions. The series even does it in such a way where it feels like the show made a deliberate choice to avoid giving a solid ending to anyone's arc."

Other reviews were more positive in their assessment. Daniel Kurland of Den of Geek gave the episode a 3 star rating out of 5 and wrote "Shameless, much like the Gallaghers themselves, was messy, but never lacking in love. That sentiment has never been more true than with “Father Frank, Full of Grace,” which goes out on its own imperfect terms." Mads Misasi of Telltale TV gave the episode a 4.5 star rating out of 5 and wrote "For a show that hasn't always been consistent, the finale is a beautiful homage to who the Gallaghers are and what this show is all about. It utilizes a mix of flashback scenes and open-ended storytelling to show life ending and life continuing." Amber Dowling of Variety praised the decision to kill off Frank, writing "while the finale left many questions concerning the fates of the remaining Gallagher clan, one thing viewers know for sure is that these characters are no longer constrained by the addicted man who was without a doubt more of a dead weight than an anchor."

=== Accolades ===
William H. Macy submitted the episode to support his nomination for Outstanding Lead Actor in a Comedy Series at the 73rd Primetime Emmy Awards. He would lose to Jason Sudeikis for the series Ted Lasso.
