= Frances Francis Franny Frank =

- Shameless episode
- Episode no.: Season 11; Episode 3
- Directed by: Jude Weng
- Written by: Philip Buiser
- Cinematography by: Anthony Hardwick
- Editing by: Michael S. Stern
- Original release date: December 20, 2020
- Running time: 57 minutes

Guest appearances
- Toks Olagundoye as Leesie Janes; Deric Augustine as Milton; Brenda Banda as Doris; Mia Barron as Liz; Sterling Beaumon as Mack; Scott Michael Campbell as Brad; Elise Eberle as Sandy Milkovich; Sean O'Bryan as George; Patricia Scanlon as Anna Tremblay; Wayne Lopez as Wyatt; Jim Hoffmaster as Kermit; Michael Patrick McGill as Tommy

Episode chronology
| ← Previous "Go Home, Gentrifier!" | Next → "NIMBY" |
- Shameless season 11

"Frances Francis Franny Frank" is the third episode of the eleventh season of the American television comedy drama Shameless, an adaptation of the British series of the same name. It is the 125th overall episode of the series and was written by co-executive producer Philip Buiser, and directed by Jude Weng. It originally aired on Showtime on December 20, 2020.

The series is set on the South Side of Chicago, Illinois, and depicts the poor, dysfunctional family of Frank Gallagher, a neglectful single father of six: Fiona, Phillip, Ian, Debbie, Carl, and Liam. He spends his days drunk, high, or in search of money, while his children need to learn to take care of themselves. The family's status is shaken after Fiona chooses to leave. In the episode, Frank spends the day with Franny, while Debbie tries to locate her. Meanwhile, Ian hits his breaking point at the warehouse, and Carl gets a new partner.

According to Nielsen Media Research, the episode was seen by an estimated 0.62 million household viewers and gained a 0.13 ratings share among adults aged 18–49. The episode received generally positive reviews from critics, who praised Frank's storyline and emotional tone.

== Plot ==
After being hired to work at a wealthy woman's house, Debbie hurriedly leaves the house without taking Franny to school. Liam prepares to take Franny to school, but eventually allows Frank to take her. When he takes her to the wrong school, he decides to take her with him for the day.

While having sex with Ian, Mickey decides to change positions, leading an argument between both over who is the "man". They go their separate ways, trying to ask people in their inner circles over who is better. When Ian's boss wants him to work during his lunch break with no payment, Ian lashes out at him and quits his job. Ian and Mickey get into a fight at the Alibi, until Veronica separates them. Kevin uses his new business venture to buy expensive items for his family, but ends up with his new car stolen. Mickey offers himself to make the sure Kevin's shipments are delivered in time and without being stolen, and Kevin accepts.

Carl meets his new partner, Leesie Janes. While Carl is fascinated that she is committed to her job, he is surprised when she shoplifts, puts civilians in risk, brutally assaults a criminal, and then uses police brutality to get the criminal to testify. When he asks her about her tactics, she says that she only cares about justice, no matter the cost. Lip and Tami console Brad and Cami when their baby experiences severe health problems. Lip offers to pay for the surgery, but Brad kindly turns him down. Frank takes Franny with him to convince his contacts in reducing the fees for the marijuana supplies, while also bonding with his granddaughter. As he takes her to get a tattoo, Frank experiences confusion over his state. When Franny tells him that she does not want to wear a beauty pageant dress that Debbie wants her to attend, Frank tells her that even if she dislikes it, she should do it to appease her mother.

Debbie steals food from the wealthy woman's house to serve at Franny's school, discovering that she never got to school. She and Sandy (Elise Eberle) drive through town looking for Franny, after learning that she was with Frank. During this, Debbie is called by the woman, who called the police after discovering she stole from her; she will not report her, but fires her nevertheless. Noticing Frank and Franny in the street, Debbie takes her and scolds Frank for his actions. At the house, she reprimands Liam for abandoning Franny. The family defends Liam, with Lip telling Debbie that she must take responsibility for her daughter, calling her a bad mother. As she cries in her room, Debbie is visited by Franny, who has decided to wear the dress after being convinced by Frank.

== Production ==
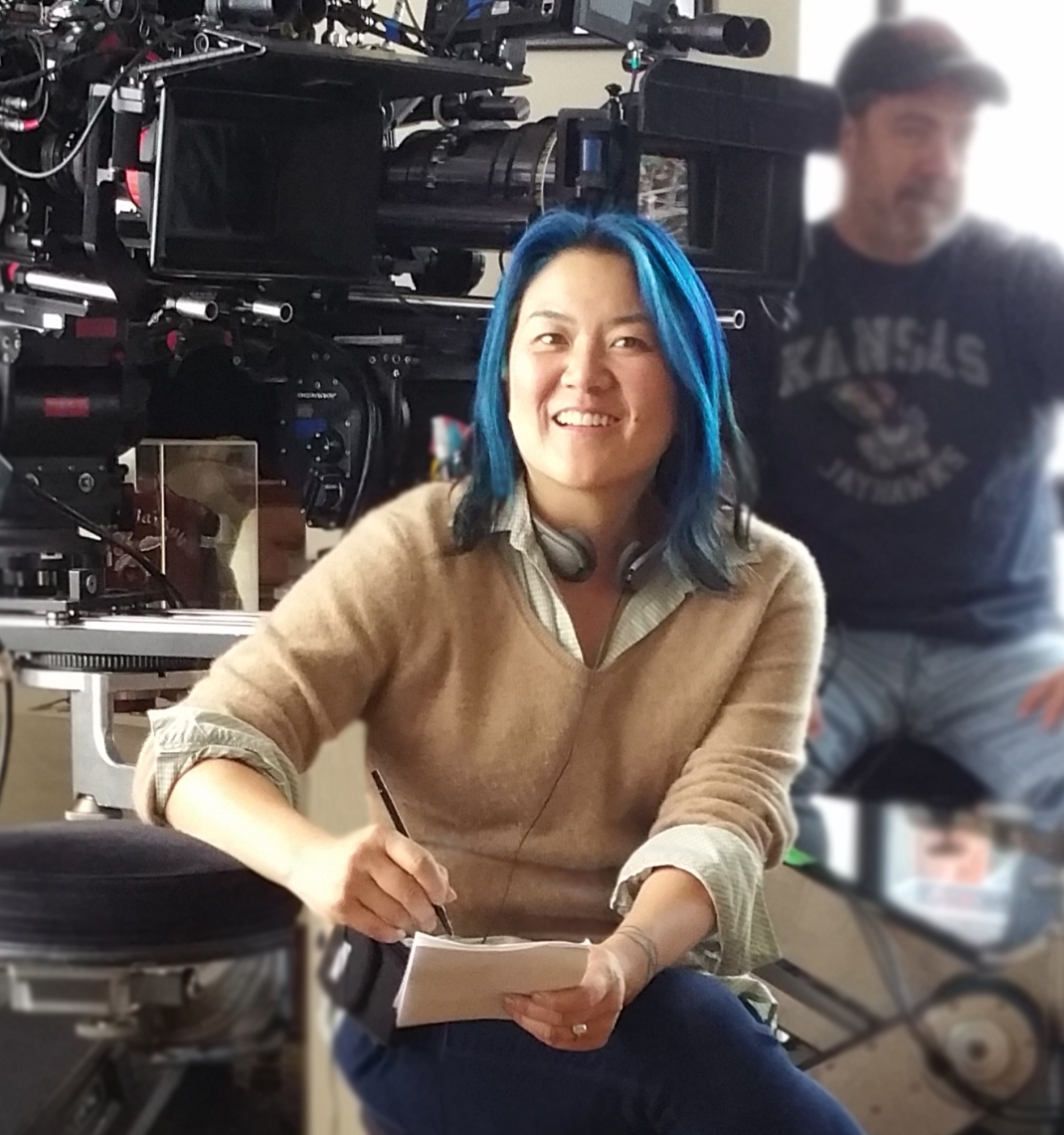
The episode was directed by Jude Weng.

The episode was written by co-executive producer Philip Buiser, and directed by Jude Weng. It was Buiser's fifth writing credit, and Weng's first directing credit.

== Reception ==
=== Viewers ===
In its original American broadcast, "Frances Francis Franny Frank" was seen by an estimated 0.62 million household viewers with a 0.13 in the 18–49 demographics. This means that 0.13 percent of all households with televisions watched the episode. This was a 11 percent decrease in viewership from the previous episode, which was seen by an estimated 0.69 million household viewers with a 0.14 in the 18–49 demographics.

=== Critical reviews ===
"Frances Francis Franny Frank" received generally positive reviews from critics. Myles McNutt of The A.V. Club gave the episode a "B–" grade and wrote, "There's no question that Shameless' final season would be improved if the kind of reflection embedded in Frank's portion of “Frances Francis Franny Frank” was happening in every storyline, but this was the first time this season where I started to think that maybe the show just needs time to build up to it. This isn't to say that I'm optimistic that a show that has forgotten how to tell meaningful stories will magically figure it out across the entire narrative in the next nine episodes, but I'm at least convinced it's something they're aware of needing to strive toward, and I'm going to choose to see this as a positive sign if only for the state of my mental health reviewing the show."

Daniel Kurland of Den of Geek gave the episode a 3.5 star rating out of 5 and wrote "Shameless episodes always feel incredibly crowded and it typically doesn't work in the show's favor. It shouldn't be afraid to leave characters out of the spotlight or find more ways to bring characters together rather than jump between a mess of disparate threads. The season is getting better in this department, but there's still a ton of excess when it comes to characters and stories." Mads Misasi of Telltale TV gave the episode a 4.5 star rating out of 5 and wrote "If you are convinced you could never feel any sympathy for Frank Gallagher, then Shameless Season 11 Episode 3, “Frances Francis Franny Frank,” will take you by surprise. The episode manages to really pull at our heartstrings in the most unlikely of ways."

Paul Dailly of TV Fanatic gave the episode a 3 star rating out of 5 and wrote ""Frances Francis Franny Frank" was another decent episode of the series. The storylines are moving along nicely, but there are still some issues." Meaghan Darwish of TV Insider wrote "The South Side gets wilder with each passing day, and in the latest installment of Shameless, the Gallaghers' usual shenanigans have an extra dose o drama. Whether it's Frank's business dealings or Debbie's single parent struggles, there’s never a dull moment."
