= Go Home, Gentrifier! =

- Shameless episode
- Episode no.: Season 11; Episode 2
- Directed by: Silver Tree
- Written by: Nancy M. Pimental
- Cinematography by: Anthony Hardwick
- Editing by: Chetin Chabuk
- Original release date: December 13, 2020
- Running time: 52 minutes

Guest appearances
- Joshua Malina as Arthur Tipping; Lexi Ainsworth as Amber; Elise Eberle as Sandy Milkovich; Sean O'Bryan as George; Peggy Miley as Rhoda Tipping; Jim Hoffmaster as Kermit; Michael Patrick McGill as Tommy; Hilda Boulware as Marsha; Justin Huen as Jose; Wayne Lopez as Wyatt; Wendy Worthington as Loraine

Episode chronology
← Previous "This Is Chicago!"	Next → "Frances Francis Franny Frank"
- Shameless season 11

"Go Home, Gentrifier!" is the second episode of the eleventh season of the American television comedy drama Shameless, an adaptation of the British series of the same name. It is the 124th overall episode of the series and was written by executive producer Nancy M. Pimental and directed by Silver Tree. It originally aired on Showtime on December 13, 2020.

The series is set on the South Side of Chicago, Illinois, and depicts the poor, dysfunctional family of Frank Gallagher, a neglectful single father of six: Fiona, Phillip, Ian, Debbie, Carl, and Liam. He spends his days drunk, high, or in search of money, while his children need to learn to take care of themselves. The family's status is shaken after Fiona chooses to leave. In the episode, Ian tries to make money the legal way, while Mickey reverts to old ways to make his money. Meanwhile, Carl begins his first day as a police officer, while Frank partners with Kevin and Veronica in a new business venture.

According to Nielsen Media Research, the episode was seen by an estimated 0.69 million household viewers and gained a 0.14 ratings share among adults aged 18–49. The episode received generally positive reviews from critics, who considered it as an improvement over the season premiere.

== Plot ==
Having graduated, Carl begins his first day as a police officer. He is paired with veteran officer Arthur Tipping, but is bored with his lazy and non-aggressive personality. Carl grows frustrated when he learns that a friend had the chance to get involved in a fight.

Ian tells Mickey that he must find a job as they cannot afford anything with Ian's salary, declaring that he will not have sex with him until he finds one. Mickey dismisses the threat, but eventually relents when he finds an infomercial. He applies for Ian's job at the warehouse, but the interviewer is not convinced by his behavior. Debbie starts preparing Franny's 5th birthday party; she wants a princess themed party, even though Franny is not interested in that. When the party ends up a failure, Debbie finally admits to Sandy (Elise Eberle) that she wanted the party for herself, as she never had a proper birthday party as a child.

When their marijuana starts running out, Kevin and Veronica partner with Frank in a business venture, wherein Frank can get them marijuana from his contact. The first operation is a success, and they split their earnings in three equal parts. Nevertheless, Frank says he wants 50%, which Veronica refuses. Tommy and Kermit (Jim Hoffmaster) now sit in the opposite ends of the Alibi after their sexual encounter, but do not disclose it to anyone. Lip and Tami find that their house has been vandalized, discovering that their neighbors are responsible. They explain that the renovations will lead to an increase in rent and taxes in the neighborhood, prompting Lip and Tami to make graffitis at their house.

Carl makes Arthur invite him to a drink, and is surprised when Arthur excessively drinks. However, while having sex with a woman, Arthur has a heart attack and is taken by an ambulance. To get money, Mickey steals expired items to prison and sells them, giving him more money than Ian, who is facing a cut salary at the warehouse. Unwilling to cooperate with Frank, Veronica forces Kevin to accompany her and get the marijuana from Frank's contact. To their surprise, Frank has already bought most of her product with his earnings. Feeling betrayed, he warns them that if they want to continue their venture, his share is now 70%.

== Production ==
=== Development ===
The episode was written by executive producer Nancy M. Pimental and directed by Silver Tree. It was Pimental's 25th writing credit, and Tree's fourth directing credit.

== Reception ==
=== Viewers ===
In its original American broadcast, "Go Home, Gentrifier!" was seen by an estimated 0.69 million household viewers with a 0.14 in the 18–49 demographics. This means that 0.14 percent of all households with televisions watched the episode. This was a slight decrease in viewership from the previous episode, which was seen by an estimated 0.70 million household viewers with a 0.13 in the 18–49 demographics.

=== Critical reviews ===
"Go Home, Gentrifier!" received generally positive reviews from critics. Myles McNutt of The A.V. Club gave the episode a "C+" grade and wrote, "“Go Home, Gentrifier!” could be a reflective experience that solidified each character's place within key themes of the show, raising the stakes of their respective choices as the show reaches its conclusion: instead it's an occasionally amusing but mostly pointless exercise, far from what a final season of even a low-stakes show demands."

Daniel Kurland of Den of Geek wrote "“Go Home, Gentrifier!” works out any of the kinks present in Shameless' season premiere as it confidently moves ahead in its final season. This episode is very crowded, which is something that Shameless always struggles with, but all of these storylines feel natural and that they're contributing to a larger whole." Mads Misasi of Telltale TV gave the episode a 4.5 star rating out of 5 and wrote "This episode is the best comedically since probably Season 1 or 2. That being said, “Go Home, Gentrifier,” has its positives and its negatives with regards to plot and character growth."

Paul Dailly of TV Fanatic gave the episode a 3.75 star rating out of 5 and wrote ""Go Home, Gentrifier" should have been the season premiere, and [This Is Chicago!] should not have been a part of the season. The premiere was filled with needless exposition, but there are signs of life with the series." Meaghan Darwish of TV Insider wrote "The episode concludes with Lip and Tami taking spray paint to their front porch, with him scrawling “Go home, gentrifier” in bright red, and Tami opting to paint a penis. Should we expect anything less from a show called Shameless?"
