= DNR (Shameless) =

- Shameless episode
- Episode no.: Season 11; Episode 10
- Directed by: Anthony Hardwick
- Written by: Corina Martescu
- Cinematography by: Anthony Vietro
- Editing by: Michael S. Stern
- Original release date: March 28, 2021
- Running time: 55 minutes

Guest appearances
- Joshua Malina as Arthur Tipping; A. Russell Andrews as Lance; Vanessa Bell Calloway as Carol Fisher; June Carryl as Beatrice; Shar Jackson as Constance; Sam Pancake as Larry; Patrick Sabongui as Martin; Kimleigh Smith as Sgt. Stamps; Phyllis Yvonne Stickney as Bev; Jim Hoffmaster as Kermit; Michael Patrick McGill as Tommy

Episode chronology
← Previous "Survivors"	Next → "The Fickle Lady is Calling it Quits"
- Shameless season 11

"DNR" is the tenth episode of the eleventh season of the American television comedy drama Shameless, an adaptation of the British series of the same name. It is the 132nd overall episode of the series and was written by Corina Martescu, and directed by Anthony Hardwick. It originally aired on Showtime on March 28, 2021.

The series is set on the South Side of Chicago, Illinois, and depicts the poor, dysfunctional family of Frank Gallagher, a neglectful single father of six: Fiona, Phillip, Ian, Debbie, Carl, and Liam. He spends his days drunk, high, or in search of money, while his children need to learn to take care of themselves. The family's status is shaken after Fiona chooses to leave. In the episode, the Gallaghers debate on how to return the stolen painting, while Liam is forced to take care of Frank. Meanwhile, Ian and Mickey find an apartment, while Carl finds that his colleagues are not friendly.

According to Nielsen Media Research, the episode was seen by an estimated 0.59 million household viewers and gained a 0.14 ratings share among adults aged 18–49. The episode received generally positive reviews from critics, although some expressed criticism for the amount of subplots.

== Plot ==
As the news report that the Nighthawks painting was stolen from the Art Institute of Chicago, the Gallaghers debate on what to do, as Carl warns they could all face ten years in prison. They are forced to leave for other errands, while Liam (Christian Isaiah) takes Frank with him to prevent him from revealing the robbery to anyone.

Lip works on preparing the house for sale, while also preparing the Gallagher household for potential customers. During this, he discovers that the gas will not function due to damaged pipes. To pay for new pipes, he is forced to sell one of his bikes for a lower price. Ian and Mickey cover the Alibi, but decide to leave when they discover an affordable apartment at West Side. While Mickey likes the apartment, he does not like living in the West Side. Nevertheless, Ian has already signed a lease on the apartment.

Debbie takes Franny to accompany her in finding a new house, but she struggles with the idea of changes. She later fears ruining her life when they run into a homeless woman who was kicked out by her family. Kevin travels to Louisville to help Veronica and Carol with moving out. He takes a break to eat a burger at a bar, and then offers to fill in as a replacement bartender, making more money there in one day than the Alibi earns in a week. The manager is so impressed with Kevin’s abilities that he offers him a job. Veronica also has a chance to work for a local congressman in the city, prompting both of them to question their future in Chicago.

Carl reluctantly continues his work at the Eviction Unit. He is annoyed when a wealthy man double-parks near evicted people, and proceeds to arrest him when he slaps Carl. Carl's superior and Arthur let the man go, telling Carl that his job is to simply evict poor people, as they rely on wealthy people for their benefit. Liam takes Frank with him, as he tries to bribe a classmate to give him his spot at a prestigious school. Frank's dementia worsens, and Liam is forced to take him home. As Liam explains his condition, Frank laments Liam's role as his caregiver, feeling it is not his job. Liam then takes Frank to a tattoo shop, where he gets the words "do not resuscitate" tattooed in his chest. That night, Lip and Ian discover that Franny placed stickers into the Nighthawks painting. As a last resort, they place the painting in the subway train, where a man finds it.

== Production ==
=== Development ===
The episode was written by Corina Martescu, and directed by Anthony Hardwick. It was Martescu's second writing credit, and Hardwick's second directing credit.

== Reception ==
=== Viewers ===
In its original American broadcast, "DNR" was seen by an estimated 0.59 million household viewers with a 0.14 in the 18–49 demographics. This means that 0.14 percent of all households with televisions watched the episode. This was a 22% increase in viewership from the previous episode, which was seen by an estimated 0.48 million household viewers with a 0.10 in the 18–49 demographics.

=== Critical reviews ===
"DNR" received generally positive reviews from critics. Myles McNutt of The A.V. Club gave the episode a "C+" grade and wrote, "As with much of Shameless' “end-of-life” storytelling, Frank's worsening condition is a story that's better the less you think about it. Macy's performance is selling it fine, but I just don't have enough empathy for Frank, meaning the show's effort to generate it out of thin air is going to inevitably fall short."

Daniel Kurland of Den of Geek gave the episode a 3.5 star rating out of 5 and wrote "“DNR” doesn't lay a lot of groundwork for what's to come in the series' final two installments. It should be smoother sailing for the Gallaghers now that they've communicated and opened up to each other, but the problem now is that everyone's spread too thin to have much of a conversation. There's still a messy, chaotic energy that floats around these characters, but pieces of the future are beginning to come into focus and every time one of those pieces click into place it's incredibly satisfying." Mads Misasi of Telltale TV gave the episode a 3.5 star rating out of 5 and wrote "In fact, “DNR” is a master class in showing how the lives of the Gallaghers are slowly slipping away and separating. The other siblings may not want to admit it, but Frank dying is that final notch of symbolism that their childhoods are fully coming to a close."

Paul Dailly of TV Fanatic gave the episode a 4.25 star rating out of 5 and wrote "It's not the easiest hour to unpack due to all of the different directions the characters' storylines are going, but at least we finally have a direction." Meaghan Darwish of TV Insider wrote "As Shameless quickly approaches its swan song, the pieces are beginning to fall into place for the Gallaghers' next chapters in “DNR.”"
