= This Is Chicago! =

- Shameless episode
- Episode no.: Season 11; Episode 1
- Directed by: Iain B. MacDonald
- Written by: John Wells
- Cinematography by: Anthony Hardwick
- Editing by: Nathan Allen
- Original release date: December 6, 2020
- Running time: 55 minutes

Guest appearances
- Brenda Banda as Doris; Brandon Black as Flavio; Mac Brandt as Sgt. Ruger; Casey Thomas Brown as Alan; Hutch Dano as Dash; Judith Drake as Mrs. Lionetti; Elise Eberle as Sandy Milkovich; Jonathan Goldstein as Winston; Jim Hoffmaster as Kermit; Michael Patrick McGill as Tommy

Episode chronology
← Previous "Gallavich!"	Next → "Go Home, Gentrifier!"
- Shameless season 11

"This Is Chicago!" is the first episode of the eleventh season of the American television comedy drama Shameless, an adaptation of the British series of the same name. It is the 123rd overall episode of the series and was written by series developer John Wells and directed by executive producer Iain B. MacDonald. It originally aired on Showtime on December 6, 2020.

The series is set on the South Side of Chicago, Illinois, and depicts the poor, dysfunctional family of Frank Gallagher, a neglectful single father of six: Fiona, Phillip, Ian, Debbie, Carl, and Liam. He spends his days drunk, high, or in search of money, while his children need to learn to take care of themselves. The family's status is shaken after Fiona chooses to leave. In the episode, the characters must adapt to the changes that the COVID-19 pandemic brought to the South Side.

According to Nielsen Media Research, the episode was seen by an estimated 0.70 million household viewers and gained a 0.13 ratings share among adults aged 18–49. The episode received mixed reviews from critics, with many questioning the characterization and integration of the COVID-19 pandemic into the series.

== Plot ==
Amidst the COVID-19 pandemic, Frank (William H. Macy) tells a documentarian about the Gallagher family's history with Chicago, which was involved in many events. Frank himself admits he was involved with the Chicago Seven, barely avoiding arrest. Despite the fact that the documentarian is involved in gentrification, Frank continues talking about the history of South Side.

Lip (Jeremy Allen White) and Tami (Kate Miner) are now living at the rented house with Fred, but they continue working on the renovations. Tami is also worried about Lip's job, as she feels they will not earn enough money for their expenses. Ian (Cameron Monaghan) and Mickey (Noel Fisher) continue living at the Gallagher household, with Ian now working at a warehouse. Despite the poor salary, Ian hopes to save enough money so they can buy a house for themselves. However, he discovers that Mickey took some of their wedding savings to buy stuff, upsetting him. Ian considers that they should practice monogamy to save their marriage, although Mickey is not familiar with the idea.

Debbie (Emma Kenney) is now in the sex offender registry, and is forced to wear an ankle monitor. She starts a welding business, but struggles to find job due to her status. She is disgusted when she finds that the registry mislabeled her by claiming she raped a 7-year-old. Sandy (Elise Eberle) uses her mugshot to promote her, earning her some customers. Carl (Ethan Cutkosky) is training in the police academy to become an officer, earning the respect of his superiors as he nears his graduation day. Kevin (Steve Howey) and Veronica (Shanola Hampton) begin selling hash brownies, while Kevin continues finding success with his workout business. After ingesting brownies, Tommy (Michael Patrick McGill) and Kermit (Jim Hoffmaster) have a sexual encounter in the bathroom.

Ian and Mickey discuss their possible solution to their relationship, but are unable to reach a conclusion. The family visits Lip and Tami at their house to eat pizzas, as well as helping them in painting their house. The episode ends with Frank vandalizing a political endorsement bench, which now reads "Fuck 2020."

== Production ==
=== Development ===
The episode was written by series developer John Wells and directed by executive producer Iain B. MacDonald. It was Wells' 23rd writing credit, and MacDonald's 12th directing credit.

== Reception ==
=== Viewers ===
In its original American broadcast, "This Is Chicago!" was seen by an estimated 0.70 million household viewers with a 0.13 in the 18–49 demographics. This means that 0.13 percent of all households with televisions watched the episode. This was a 24% decrease in viewership from the previous episode, which was seen by an estimated 0.92 million household viewers with a 0.29 in the 18–49 demographics.

=== Critical reviews ===
"This Is Chicago!" received mixed reviews from critics. Myles McNutt of The A.V. Club gave the episode a "C" grade and wrote, "“This Is Chicago!” needed more glimmers of hope, but now we can see the light at the end of the tunnel: either we're building to an ending that could reclaim (some of) the show's past glory, or we're at least reaching the merciless end of a patented Showtime slog as a show that should have ended years earlier limps to the finish."

Daniel Kurland of Den of Geek gave the episode a 3.5 star rating out of 5 and wrote "“This is Chicago!” starts the final season of Shameless on a busy note that's bogged down just by how much ground that it has to cover. The presence of COVID is heavy in this premiere, but this still feels like standard Shameless, for both better and for worse." Mads Misasi of Telltale TV gave the episode a 4 star rating out of 5 and wrote "If I am being completely honest, the premiere of the final season gives me the same vibes I got when watching the pilot all those years ago. Everything from a Frank voiceover down to the “kids” all pulling their own separate scams gives us that old school Shameless vibe that made us fall in love with the show to begin with."

Paul Dailly of TV Fanatic gave the episode a 1.5 star rating out of 5 and wrote "After months of delays, Shameless is back and more uneven than ever. [The episode] picked up with the Gallaghers in a COVID-19 world, but it was probably the emptiest episode in the series' history." Meaghan Darwish of TV Insider wrote "The episode ends with a big Gallagher family gathering at Lip's new house, offering just enough familiarity mixed with a reality of the show's evolution. What will they get up to next?"
