= Cancelled (Shameless) =

- Shameless episode
- Episode no.: Season 11; Episode 8
- Directed by: Shanola Hampton
- Written by: Sherman Payne
- Cinematography by: Anthony Hardwick
- Editing by: Chetin Chabuk
- Original release date: March 14, 2021
- Running time: 57 minutes

Guest appearances
- Vanessa Bell Calloway as Carol Fisher; Scott Michael Campbell as Brad; Dennis Cockrum as Terry Milkovich; James Earl as Detective Hightower; Elise Eberle as Sandy Milkovich; Michael Galante as Jared; Paula Andrea Placido as Calista; David Clayton Rogers as Detective Young; Susan Ruttan as Sister Mary Luke; Kimleigh Smith as Sgt. Stamps; Layla Alizada as Detective; Jim Hoffmaster as Kermit; Michael Patrick McGill as Tommy

Episode chronology
← Previous "Two at a Biker Bar, One in the Lake"	Next → "Survivors"
- Shameless season 11

"Cancelled" is the eighth episode of the eleventh season of the American television comedy drama Shameless, an adaptation of the British series of the same name. It is the 130th overall episode of the series and was written by co-producer Sherman Payne, and directed by main cast member Shanola Hampton. It originally aired on Showtime on March 14, 2021.

The series is set on the South Side of Chicago, Illinois, and depicts the poor, dysfunctional family of Frank Gallagher, a neglectful single father of six: Fiona, Phillip, Ian, Debbie, Carl, and Liam. He spends his days drunk, high, or in search of money, while his children need to learn to take care of themselves. The family's status is shaken after Fiona chooses to leave. In the episode, Lip gets interrogated by the police on his knowledge of the robbery. Meanwhile, Ian and Mickey are forced to find a caretaker for Terry, while Carl is reassigned to the vice unit.

According to Nielsen Media Research, the episode was seen by an estimated 0.55 million household viewers and gained a 0.09 ratings share among adults aged 18–49. The episode received mixed reviews from critics, with many criticizing the writing, humor and characterization.

== Plot ==
In police custody, Lip is questioned over the robbery, as his criminal record makes him a prime suspect. Without proper evidence, they are forced to let him go. On his way out, Lip is informed by Carl that the police will get a warrant to check his house.

Mickey decides to solve the problem with Terry once and for all when his family stops taking care of him. He and Ian hire many caretakers, but they all quit due to Terry's racist nature. Eventually, they hire Sister Mary Luke, who implements a very strict doctrine with Terry. Ian and Mickey are content with her, until she later tells them she suffocated Terry to death. Carl is not allowed to get a new partner, as the department believes he has a curse as his previous partners were injured. Instead, he is reassigned to the vice division, paired with two detectives. While Carl likes their hard-edged attitude, he is disappointed to learn they do not arrest drug dealers, and even take some cars from the evidence locker. When the detectives plan to investigate and frame the Alibi, Carl crashes their car.

Debbie stays with Calista after her fight with Lip and Sandy. Joining Calista at her bar, she uses cocaine and has sex with a man. When Calista discovers her state, a humiliated Debbie returns home with her daughter Franny. She subsequently has another fight with Sandy, scolding her for abandoning her child, and ended their relationship. With Veronica sad over Carols leaving, Kevin finally appears to find a solution: they will officially get married. With Carol's help, they are declared a marriage at the Alibi. The police searches Lip's house, but they do not find any evidence, as Tami moved it to her father's house. As they reconcile, they discover that Brad plans to confess his role in the robbery, forcing Lip to tackle and take him to his house.

Liam competes at his school to propose a new name, as the school previously had Dennis Hastert's name, and he could win an iPad if he wins. Frank is disgusted by the name change, and complains over cancel culture. Frank decides to participate in the renaming, intending to have it named after himself, but Liam is confused when Frank forgets that he already told him his plan. At the event, Frank forgets what he was going to do, and mistakes a student for an old bully, causing him to strip and get arrested. He is taken to the hospital, and the family is called to take him. The doctor finally reveals Frank's dementia to the family, surprising them.

== Production ==
=== Development ===
The episode was written by co-producer Sherman Payne, and directed by main cast member Shanola Hampton. It was Payne's fourth writing credit, and Hampton's first directing credit.

== Reception ==
=== Viewers ===
In its original American broadcast, "Cancelled" was seen by an estimated 0.55 million household viewers with a 0.14 in the 18–49 demographics. This means that 0.14 percent of all households with televisions watched the episode. This was a 34% increase in viewership from the previous episode, which was seen by an estimated 0.41 million household viewers with a 0.09 in the 18–49 demographics.

=== Critical reviews ===
"Cancelled" received mixed reviews from critics. Myles McNutt of The A.V. Club gave the episode a "C+" grade and wrote, "As much as I wish this final season had found a way to achieve this sooner, and across all of the show's storylines, I'm oddly hopeful that something meaningful could come out of this final season when all is said and done, even if we haven't seen much evidence to support it. They've got four more episodes to prove me right."

Daniel Kurland of Den of Geek gave the episode a 4 star rating out of 5 and wrote "“Cancelled” is an exceptionally strange episode of Shameless that's full of some of the most emotional scenes from the entire season as well as some seriously bizarre dramatic turns that make it feel like there's a murder quota that these episodes need to satisfy. Overall, this episode works and the moments that stick out are so unusual and unexpected that they strangely need to be respected on some level. There are four episodes left in Shameless and the characters finally feel unified and ready to address an unknown future." Mads Misasi of Telltale TV gave the episode a 4 star rating out of 5 and wrote "Since it's in its final season, fans know Shameless Season 11 Episode 8, “Cancelled” is going to hit us where it hurts with regards to Frank's dementia. However, the unexpected death of a different character takes us all by utter surprise."

Paul Dailly of TV Fanatic gave the episode a 1 star rating out of 5 and wrote "Saying goodbye to the Gallaghers is getting easier by the episode. [Cancelled] was another woeful installment filled with bizarre storytelling, needless twists, and unfunny jokes." Meaghan Darwish of TV Insider wrote "Things are coming to a head for the Gallaghers in the latest episode of Shameless. In “Cancelled,” many of the family members have to grapple with things they've long been ignoring. But some do find a silver lining."
