= Gary Levine =

Media industry executive

Gary Levine is the co-president of entertainment at Showtime Networks. Previously he served as the president of programming at Showtime, joining in 2001. During his tenure in programming, Showtime developed shows including Billions, Californication, Dexter, Escape at Dannemora, Shameless, and Who Is America?.

== Personal life ==
Levine lives in Los Angeles with his wife, who is a child psychologist. He is also the cantor at his synagogue.
