= Slaughter (Shameless) =

- Shameless episode
- Episode no.: Season 11; Episode 5
- Directed by: Daniella Eisman
- Written by: Joe Lawson
- Cinematography by: Anthony Hardwick
- Editing by: Chetin Chabuk
- Original release date: January 31, 2021
- Running time: 56 minutes

Guest appearances
- Toks Olagundoye as Leesie Janes; Deric Augustine as Milton; DaShawn Barnes as Mana; Scott Michael Campbell as Brad; Dennis Cockrum as Terry Milkovich; Elise Eberle as Sandy Milkovich; Christine Horn as Robia; Wendle Josepher as May; Sam Morgan as Patrick; Lou Taylor Pucci as Lou Milkovich; Jim Hoffmaster as Kermit; Michael Patrick McGill as Tommy

Episode chronology
← Previous "NIMBY"	Next → "Do Not Go Gentle Into That Good....Eh, Screw It"
- Shameless season 11

"Slaughter" is the fifth episode of the eleventh season of the American television comedy drama Shameless, an adaptation of the British series of the same name. It is the 127th overall episode of the series and was written by executive producer Joe Lawson, and directed by Daniella Eisman. It originally aired on Showtime on January 31, 2021.

The series is set on the South Side of Chicago, Illinois, and depicts the poor, dysfunctional family of Frank Gallagher, a neglectful single father of six: Fiona, Phillip, Ian, Debbie, Carl, and Liam. He spends his days drunk, high, or in search of money, while his children need to learn to take care of themselves. The family's status is shaken after Fiona chooses to leave. In the episode, Kevin and Frank come up with a plan to remove the Milkoviches from the neighborhood. Meanwhile, Lip and Tami realize they might have to find a new home, while Ian and Mickey run into problems at their job.

According to Nielsen Media Research, the episode was seen by an estimated 0.57 million household viewers and gained a 0.15 ratings share among adults aged 18–49. The episode received mixed reviews from critics, who criticized the lack of progress in the storylines, although many expressed surprise with the ending.

== Plot ==
After the Milkoviches leave a box with feces at his doorstep, Frank once again visits Kevin to plan a new strategy. Kevin backs out after witnessing a family member mark a swastika with a fire iron, so Frank decides that he must kill the landlord so the family can be evicted.

Lip and Tami are confused when a city worker places a "for sale" sign in front of their house. Lip realizes that on top of not paying the full ownership of the house, he is not the legitimate owner as he never signed any papers. They are forced to look for new houses, and Tami takes an interest in a house with an affordable price. They are given a tour, although Lip and the realtor do not disclose something. When they go to the Alibi Room, Kevin finally reveals the truth; the house was the site of a brutal family murder, something that Lip knew. While shocked, Tami looks determined in buying the house. Liam (Christian Isaiah) is disturbed by the presence of the Milkoviches in the neighborhood, and grows even more scared when he discovers they broke into his house and left a deer's head in his bedroom.

While transporting marijuana, Ian and Mickey are robbed by gunmen. One of these is Lou, Mickey's cousin. They are unable to fight back, as Ian forced themselves to not carry weapons. To prevent another robbery, they decide to use another vehicle. For this, they call an ambulance and steal it while the paramedics are called away. Finding a dead man in the back, they dump it near a bridge. When Sandy (Elise Eberle) becomes a little distant, Debbie places a tracker on her bag. She follows her to a strip club, but is denied access. She confronts Sandy at home, who reveals she has been driving people for money, and that she lives in her car. She also reveals that she is married, and her husband has been trying to reach her. Veronica starts canvassing Black constituents to vote for a rent control bill, only to find out for herself how scarce black people are in this new gentrified Chicago. When she finally finds a woman, she is disappointed when she refuses to vote for her own cause.

Carl and Leesie respond to a shoplifting call, and Leesie threatens the kid with chopping his hand off if he does it again. When the kid once again robs with a gun, Leesie accidentally injures herself, forcing Carl to chase him. He catches him, but states he will protect him if he stops robbing. At the shop, Lip and Brad are informed by the new owners that their salaries will be cut. When Lip complains, he is fired, prompting him to assault his superior. To get the Milkovich family out of the house, Frank forms a rally so he can kill the landlord. He unplugs her life support, but she is still alive and attacks him, forcing him to flee. Due to the rally's noise, Liam finally steps up and goes outside with a gun, shooting it in the air to proclaim he is not afraid. The bullet falls back and hits Terry (Dennis Cockrum) in the head.

== Production ==
=== Development ===
The episode was written by executive producer Joe Lawson, and directed by Daniella Eisman. It was Lawson's sixth writing credit, and Eisman's first directing credit.

== Reception ==
=== Viewers ===
In its original American broadcast, "Slaughter" was seen by an estimated 0.57 million household viewers with a 0.15 in the 18–49 demographics. This means that 0.15 percent of all households with televisions watched the episode. This was even in viewership with the previous episode, which was seen by an estimated 0.57 million household viewers with a 0.14 in the 18–49 demographics.

=== Critical reviews ===
"Slaughter" received mixed reviews from critics. Myles McNutt of The A.V. Club gave the episode a "C" grade and wrote, "“Slaughter” is maybe not objectively worse than the other episodes so far this season, but waiting three weeks for a new episode only for the show to stubbornly refuse to course correct from a bunch of dead-end storylines that you had barely thought about in the intervening weeks makes it feel worse."

Daniel Kurland of Den of Geek gave the episode a 2.5 star rating out of 5 and wrote "There's a full season's worth of new plotlines that are haphazardly initiated in this episode, but it's also possible that lightning will just strike everyone or that the South Side will experience a bout of spontaneous human combustion, because this is Shameless." Mads Misasi of Telltale TV gave the episode a 4.5 star rating out of 5 and wrote "Much like with the first four episodes of the season, Shameless Season 11 Episode 5, “Slaughter” really drives home that this season is about bringing things back to the beginning. The vibe continues to remind us of Season 1 in both comedy and dramatic antics."

Paul Dailly of TV Fanatic gave the episode a 2.75 star rating out of 5 and wrote "Shameless is going the predictable route in its final season, and it's hardly surprising. The series has been running on fumes for years. After another hiatus, ["Slaughter"] gave us only subtle hints about what to expect throughout the rest of Shameless Season 11." Meaghan Darwish of TV Insider wrote "Shameless returns after a few week off with a bang in the latest installment, “Slaughter.”"
