= Two at a Biker Bar, One in the Lake =

- Shameless episode
- Episode no.: Season 11; Episode 7
- Directed by: Satya Bhabha
- Written by: Philip Buiser
- Cinematography by: Anthony Hardwick
- Editing by: Nathan Allen
- Original release date: March 7, 2021
- Running time: 55 minutes

Guest appearances
- Chelsea Alden as Tish; Charlie Bodin as Shep; Vanessa Bell Calloway as Carol Fisher; Scott Michael Campbell as Brad; Cynthia Dallas as Motorcycle Cop; Elise Eberle as Sandy Milkovich; Gavin Houston as Paul Sikes; Michael Patrick McGill as Tommy; Mike Bash as Royal; Mason Blomberg as Prince

Episode chronology
← Previous "Do Not Go Gentle Into That Good....Eh, Screw It"	Next → "Cancelled"
- Shameless season 11

"Two at a Biker Bar, One in the Lake" is the seventh episode of the eleventh season of the American television comedy drama Shameless, an adaptation of the British series of the same name. It is the 129th overall episode of the series and was written by co-executive producer Philip Buiser, and directed by Satya Bhabha. It originally aired on Showtime on March 7, 2021.

The series is set on the South Side of Chicago, Illinois, and depicts the poor, dysfunctional family of Frank Gallagher, a neglectful single father of six: Fiona, Phillip, Ian, Debbie, Carl, and Liam. He spends his days drunk, high, or in search of money, while his children need to learn to take care of themselves. The family's status is shaken after Fiona chooses to leave. In the episode, Lip tries to convince the family in selling their house, while also running into problems with the law. Meanwhile, Carl deals with his one-night stand, Frank's health deteriorates, and Debbie confronts Sandy about her past.

According to Nielsen Media Research, the episode was seen by an estimated 0.41 million household viewers and gained a 0.09 ratings share among adults aged 18–49. The episode received generally positive reviews from critics, who praised the performances and emotional stakes of the characters.

== Plot ==
Lip (Jeremy Allen White) and Tami (Kate Miner) once again talk with the family to discuss selling the house, but the discussion yields mixed results. Tami grows frustrated that Lip has not properly planned, but Lip asks for one day to convince everyone to sell the house.

Realizing they do not have friends, Ian (Cameron Monaghan) and Mickey (Noel Fisher) decide to look for new friends to hang out with. They are introduced to more couples. However, they decide to leave when they start dancing to "Rain on Me". Ian decides to join Lip in selling the house. Carl (Ethan Cutkosky) begins ignoring Tish (Chelsea Alden) and goes off the script when giving a pep talk to children to open up about his problems. He subsequently confronts Tish over "raping" him, upsetting her. Tish reveals she never meant any harm, and is not interested in relying on Carl, as she is currently going to college. Despite Carl's attempts to reconcile, she breaks up with him.

Despite being told by Lip and Brad (Scott Michael Campbell) to keep the bikes at his space, Kevin (Steve Howey) decides to take one for a ride. However, he is pulled over by a police officer, although she only wanted to admire the bike. When she suggests buying it, Kevin is scared that its stolen status is discovered. Desperate, he asks Tommy (Michael Patrick McGill) for help in disposing of the bikes; two are left at a biker bar, while Kevin takes the other bike to dump it into Lake Michigan. Lip and Brad are infuriated upon learning this, as they now have no possible income. Debbie (Emma Kenney) and Sandy (Elise Eberle) are shocked when the latter's ex-husband Royal (Mike Bash) returns and reveals that Sandy has a son, Prince (Mason Blomberg). Royal drops off his child with her while he goes to work. When Debbie scolds Sandy for abandoning her child and asks her to get joint custody, Sandy storms off.

Liam (Christian Isaiah) asks Veronica (Shanola Hampton) to help him find a home, as he knows his family will not take care of him. Veronica also learns that Carol (Vanessa Bell Calloway) is leaving Chicago. Frank (William H. Macy) wanders through the city, as his dementia starts overcoming him; he enters different houses, forgets the Alibi's location and takes a bus past his destination. Fed up with Lip's actions, Tami decides to leave with Fred to her father's. They get into a heavy argument, and Lip angrily leaves. He takes a sledgehammer and goes to the Gallagher household, smashing a wall in order to build an open floor to boost the house's value. He gets into a fight with his family over his decision to sell the house, and Debbie leaves in tears. Outside, she is approached by two police officers who are looking for Lip.

== Production ==
=== Development ===
The episode was written by co-executive producer Philip Buiser, and directed by Satya Bhabha. It was Buiser's sixth writing credit, and Bhabha's first directing credit.

== Reception ==
=== Viewers ===
In its original American broadcast, "Two at a Biker Bar, One in the Lake" was seen by an estimated 0.41 million household viewers with a 0.09 in the 18–49 demographics. This means that 0.09 percent of all households with televisions watched the episode. This was a 22% decrease in viewership from the previous episode, which was seen by an estimated 0.52 million household viewers with a 0.09 in the 18–49 demographics.

=== Critical reviews ===
"Two at a Biker Bar, One in the Lake" received generally positive reviews from critics. Myles McNutt of The A.V. Club gave the episode a "B–" grade and wrote, "“Two At A Biker Bar, One In The Lake” eventually does push the global story further toward its conclusion, as a frustrated Lip decides to skip the democratic process and start demolition just as the cops show up with questions about the burglary. But because both Lip and Debbie's stories are full of dumb hijinks and contrived storytelling, it's hard to feel like the episode generates much momentum in the process."

Daniel Kurland of Den of Geek gave the episode a 4 star rating out of 5 and wrote "“Two at a Biker Bar, One in the Lake” is a satisfying episode that greatly benefits from a smart script that's heavy in humor. This season of Shameless has gotten a little away from itself, but this episode turns to more grounded scenarios that are rooted in the characters' backstories. It's exactly what the series needs right now and as Frank loses track of who he is in a mental capacity and Lip loses sight of himself based on how far he's fallen, it's reassuring that Shameless has found itself and remembers what makes it work as it heads into the Chicago sunset." Mads Misasi of Telltale TV gave the episode a 3.5 star rating out of 5 and wrote "To sell or not to sell, that is the question on Shameless Season 11 Episode 7, “Two at a Biker Bar, One in the Lake.” It may be the one decision that finally tears this family apart."

Paul Dailly of TV Fanatic gave the episode a 2.5 star rating out of 5 and wrote ""Two at a Biker Bar, One in the Lake" was another ho-hum installment. Frank's storyline isn't even going anywhere if the family doesn't acknowledge his existence, but at least the show is starting to build toward a conclusion, I guess." Meaghan Darwish of TV Insider wrote "Eventually Frank makes it back home, tipped off by Lip's rushing by with a sledgehammer, but will his family's turmoil simmer down enough for them to notice his concerning state? Whether Frank deserves it or not, we kind of hope so."
