= Iain B. MacDonald =

British television director

- Born: Southend-on-Sea
- Occupation: Television director
- Known for: Co-creator of the Essex International Film Festival
- Television: Episodes; Shameless; Bluestone 42; White Van Man; Daredevil: Born Again

Iain B. MacDonald is an Irish and English director. He was born in Southend-on-Sea, and is a co-creator of the Essex International Film Festival.

== Career ==
He started his career making arts documentaries, most notably Gilbert & George Day Tripping, featuring the art duo Gilbert & George, before moving into television drama after winning the Best Short Film Award at the Edinburgh International Film Festival in 2004 for Billy's Day Out.

He has directed a range of projects, such as the series Episodes,. In 2014, he was nominated for an Emmy for Outstanding Directing in a Comedy Series for his work on Episodes.

Since moving to Los Angeles in 2015 he has served as the producing director for Preacher and multiple seasons of Shameless. He has directed episodes of Wayne, Black Monday, Survivor's Remorse, Daredevil: Born Again, Shantaram, and two episodes of Poker Face.
