= Shameless (American TV series) =

Comedy-drama series (2011–2021)

- Genre: Comedy-drama; Family drama; Black comedy; Satire
- Created by: Paul Abbott
- Based on: Shameless by Paul Abbott
- Developed by: John Wells
- Showrunner: John Wells
- Starring: William H. Macy; Emmy Rossum; Justin Chatwin; Ethan Cutkosky; Shanola Hampton; Steve Howey; Emma Kenney; Jeremy Allen White; Cameron Monaghan; Noel Fisher; Joan Cusack; Laura Slade Wiggins; Zach McGowan; Emma Greenwell; Jake McDorman; Emily Bergl; Isidora Goreshter; Richard Flood; Christian Isaiah; Kate Miner
- Opening theme: "The Luck You Got" by The High Strung
- Composers: Mark Mothersbaugh; iZLER
- Country of origin: United States
- Original language: English
- No. of seasons: 11
- No. of episodes: 134 (list of episodes)

Production
- Executive producers: John Wells; Mark Mylod; Paul Abbott; Andrew Stearn; Etan Frankel; Krista Vernoff; Davey Holmes; Nancy M. Pimental; Christopher Chulack; Michael Hissrich; Erin Jontow; Joe Lawson; Silver Tree; Iain B. MacDonald
- Production locations: Chicago, Illinois; Los Angeles, California
- Cinematography: Rodney Charters; Kevin McKnight
- Running time: 44–60 minutes
- Production companies: John Wells Productions; Bonanza Productions; Warner Bros. Television; Showtime Networks

Original release
- Network: Showtime
- Release: January 9, 2011 – April 11, 2021

Related
- Shameless (British version)

Shameless is an American comedy-drama television series developed by John Wells that aired on Showtime from January 9, 2011, to April 11, 2021. It is an adaptation of Paul Abbott's British series of the same name and features an ensemble cast led by William H. Macy. The series is set in the South Side of Chicago, Illinois.

With the premiere of the ninth season on September 9, 2018, Shameless became the longest-running scripted original series in Showtime's history. In January 2020, the series was renewed for its eleventh and final season, which was scheduled to premiere in mid-2020, but was delayed due to the COVID-19 pandemic; it instead premiered on December 6, 2020. On December 14, 2020, Showtime announced that they were airing a clip show series during Season 11, titled Shameless: Hall of Shame, containing new scenes juxtaposed with clips from the show to summarize the characters' journeys during the prior 10 seasons. The series finale aired on April 11, 2021.

== Premise ==
Set in South Side, Chicago, this drama follows Frank Gallagher, a neglectful single father of six who spends his leisure time drinking at bars since his wife left the family due to bipolar disorder. Due to the absence of a parental figure, the Gallagher children try to get through their days by running countless scams, affairs, and petty crimes throughout Chicago.

== Cast and characters ==
- William H. Macy as Frank Gallagher, the patriarch of the Gallagher family and father to Fiona, Lip, Ian, Carl, Debbie and Liam. He's an alcoholic and chronically unemployed; instead, he makes money through various scams. He's a narcissist who cares only about his next drink or drugs, often endangering or abandoning his children to fulfill his own needs. Despite being egocentric, Frank does love his children and at times proves himself a better parent than their mother, Monica.
- Emmy Rossum as Fiona Gallagher, the feisty, street-smart eldest Gallagher sibling, who raises the children on her own due to Frank and Monica's neglect and eventually becomes their legal guardian in season 3. She struggles with addiction, impulsive behavior and self-destructive tendencies. (seasons 1–9)
- Justin Chatwin as Steve Wilton / Jimmy Lishman, a car thief who is the love interest of Fiona for the first three seasons. (seasons 1–3; special guest star seasons 4–5)
- Jeremy Allen White as Philip "Lip" Gallagher, the second oldest Gallagher child, who is highly intelligent, and he also takes care of the parental duties. Like his father, he suffers from alcohol addiction in the later seasons. Unlike his father, he becomes sober. In season 10, he becomes a father and is a motorcycle repairman.
- Cameron Monaghan as Ian Gallagher, the third oldest Gallagher child. Strong-hearted, persistent, and goofy, he is gay and engages in an on-and-off relationship with Mickey, whom he later marries in season 10. In season 1, it's revealed that he's not Frank's son and Monica had an affair with one of Frank's brothers. Like his mother Monica, he struggles with bipolar disorder.
- Emma Kenney as Debbie Gallagher, the fourth Gallagher child and youngest daughter, who becomes a mother to her daughter, Franny, named after Frank, at age 15. She later comes out as a lesbian and dates Sandy Milkovich, the cousin to Mandy and Mickey. She displays extreme abandonment issues due to her parents' treatment which causes her to be clingy and erratic with her romantic relationships. As an adult, she becomes a freelance welder.
- Ethan Cutkosky as Carl Gallagher, the fifth Gallagher child, who has a tendency for troublemaking as a child, and goes to juvenile prison as a teenager. He grows up to be a policeman after witnessing a murder and wanting to help the poor.
- Christian Isaiah as Liam Gallagher, the mixed-race youngest Gallagher child. His parentage is uncertain to begin with due to his darker complexion, however when Monica has a DNA test done on him it is revealed he is indeed Frank's son; Frank mentions that his paternal grandmother had an affair with a black saxophone player which explains Liam's skintone. As the youngest child, his care is a key priority for his older siblings throughout the series. (seasons 9–11; recurring season 8) (His role has been recast three times. In seasons 1–2, he's played by twins, Blake and Brennan Johnson. In seasons 3–7, he's played by twins, Brenden and Brandon Sims. From season 8 and onward, he's played by Christian Isaiah)
- Shanola Hampton as Veronica "V" Fisher, Fiona's best friend and neighbor, who lives with her husband Kevin and, later, their twin daughters. She and Kevin often help out the Gallaghers, being their only real adult role models.
- Steve Howey as Kevin "Kev" Ball, Veronica's husband and the owner of the series' main and local bar The Alibi Room. He comes from a rough childhood as he was in the foster care system for the majority of his childhood life but has an eccentric personality and is always goofy.
- Noel Fisher as Mickey Milkovich, a violent and erratic member of the Milkovich family, who are neighbors of the Gallaghers. He is Ian's main love interest and later husband who eventually becomes estranged from his family due to their homophobic and white supremacist attitudes. He has an ex-wife, Svetlana, whom he was forced to marry by his homophobic father (seasons 3–5, 10–11; recurring seasons 1–2; special guest star seasons 6–7, 9). They have a son named Yevgeny.
- Joan Cusack as Sheila Jackson, mother to Karen and love interest to Frank for the first five seasons. She is a sex addict seeking dominance over men and suffers from agoraphobia which prevents her leaving the house in the earlier seasons. She leaves Chicago in an RV at the end of season five. (special guest star seasons 1–5)
- Laura Slade Wiggins as Karen Jackson, Sheila's rebellious and destructive daughter and an early love interest for Lip. She later gets hit by a car that was driven by Mandy, which leaves her to be permanently brain damaged, and decides to move with her much older ex-husband Jody to seek treatment in Arizona. (seasons 1–2; recurring season 3)
- Zach McGowan as Jody Silverman, Karen's husband and adoptive father to her son, who later becomes a love interest to Sheila before reuniting with Karen and moving away. (season 3; recurring season 2)
- Emma Greenwell as Mandy Milkovich, the sister of Mickey, love interest of Lip, and best friend of Ian, whom she pretends to date in season one to hide the fact he is gay. She eventually leaves to escape her physically abusive boyfriend. She later returns to come back as an escort. (seasons 3–4; recurring season 2; guest season 5; special guest season 6) (Jane Levy played Mandy for six episodes of season 1)
- Jake McDorman as Mike Pratt, Fiona's boss and love interest. (season 4; recurring season 3)
- Emily Bergl as Sammi Slott, the needy and manipulative elder half-sister of the Gallaghers, who is revealed in season 4 to be a product of a teen romance of Frank's. She is the mother to Chuck. (season 5; special guest season 4)
- Isidora Goreshter as Svetlana Yevgenivna, a Russian émigré who is Mickey's wife and the mother of his child. She later divorces him and engages in a throuple with Kevin and Veronica while working at their bar. (seasons 7–8; recurring seasons 3–6)
- Richard Flood as Ford Kellogg, an Irish carpenter and love interest to Fiona. (season 9; special guest season 8)
- Kate Miner as Tami Tamietti, a hairdresser from a middle-class background who is Lip's love interest and later mother to his child. (seasons 10–11; recurring season 9)

== Episodes ==
Season	Episodes	Originally released	
Season	Episodes	First released	Last released
1	12	January 9, 2011	March 27, 2011
2	12	January 8, 2012	April 1, 2012
3	12	January 13, 2013	April 7, 2013
4	12	January 12, 2014	April 6, 2014
5	12	January 11, 2015	April 5, 2015
6	12	January 10, 2016	April 3, 2016
7	12	October 2, 2016	December 18, 2016
8	12	November 5, 2017	January 28, 2018
9	14	September 9, 2018	March 10, 2019
10	12	November 10, 2019	January 26, 2020
11	12	December 6, 2020	April 11, 2021

== Production ==
=== Development ===
Shameless was adapted from a long-running, award-winning British television comedy drama of the same name. HBO began developing an American version of Shameless after striking a deal with John Wells in January 2009. By April of that year, development had moved to Showtime. John Wells Productions taped a pilot episode for the cable network in December 2009. The show's creator Paul Abbott said, "It's not My Name Is Earl or Roseanne. It's got a much graver level of poverty attached to it. It's not blue collar, it's no collar." Showrunner John Wells fought efforts to place the show in the South or in a trailer park. "We have a comedic tradition of making fun of the people in those worlds," he said. "The reality is that these people aren't 'the other'—they're people who live four blocks down from you and two blocks over."

William H. Macy stars in the lead role as Frank Gallagher, joined by Emmy Rossum as Fiona and Justin Chatwin as Steve, former co-stars from Dragonball Evolution. Paul Abbott, whose semi-autobiographical telescript was the basis for the British pilot, is credited as an executive producer on the American version.

In April 2010, Showtime green-lit the series with a 12-episode order.

Before William H. Macy took the role, Woody Harrelson was originally considered to play the character Frank Gallagher in the 2010 remake.

The Sheila Jackson character (a romantic interest for Frank), was first portrayed by Allison Janney in a pilot; however, in late August 2010, the role was recast and Joan Cusack ended up playing Sheila for the aired episodes. Production began in mid-September.

A preview of the pilot aired on December 12, 2010, after the Season 5 finale of Dexter. The first season officially began airing on Showtime on Sunday, January 9, 2011.

The series is set in Chicago's Back of the Yards neighborhood on the South Side. The house that the Gallaghers call home is an actual house in an actual Chicago neighborhood and has been visited by fans.

Most episodes begin with one of the main characters breaking the fourth wall to berate the viewer about missing previous episodes. Then the show cuts to a recap montage of plot points relevant to the current episode, followed by the opening title sequence.

=== Filming ===
The series is mostly filmed at a Los Angeles studio, with some scenes filmed in Chicago. Despite most of the filming being done in California, most of the houses and other notable locations can actually be found in the Southside of Chicago, Illinois. Initial shooting of the second season began on July 5, 2011 and premiered January 8, 2012. The series was renewed for a third season on February 1, 2012, and initial shooting began June 27, 2012. The third season premiered on January 13, 2013, and two weeks later on January 29, Shameless was renewed for a fourth season. It premiered January 12, 2014. On February 18, 2014, the series was renewed for a fifth season. Production on the first episode of the fifth season began on July 3, 2014, with the first episode table read, with initial shooting for the season beginning on July 8, 2014. The series was renewed for a sixth season on January 12, 2015. Shameless was renewed for a 12-episode seventh season on January 12, 2016. Season 7 premiered on October 2, 2016.

In December 2016, it was reported that Emmy Rossum, after multiple seasons of being paid significantly less than her co-star William H. Macy, requested that she be paid equally and compensated in future seasons to make up for the previous salary discrepancies. The equal pay negotiations, which were vocally supported by her co-star Macy, briefly delayed work on an eighth season of the series while she and Warner Bros. Television negotiated. The dispute came to an end on December 14, when Rossum confirmed through Twitter that she would continue to work on the series, with production of an eighth season to begin in May 2017. On December 19, 2016, Showtime officially announced that Shameless had been renewed for an eighth season. Just days after the eighth-season premiere, it was announced that the show had been renewed for a ninth, which would bring the show past the 100-episode mark.

In August 2018, Rossum announced her departure from Shameless after nine seasons playing Fiona Gallagher. In October 2018, Cameron Monaghan also announced his departure from the series after playing Ian Gallagher for nine seasons; however, it was later announced Monaghan was expected to return for the tenth season.

On January 13, 2020, it was announced that the series had been renewed for its eleventh and final season, which had been scheduled to air in summer 2020 but was then delayed because of the COVID-19 pandemic, and that Macy, White, Cutkosky, Hampton, Howey, Kenney, Monaghan, Fisher, Miner, and Isaiah would all return for the series' final season. Production on the final season commenced on September 8, 2020. Production for the final season ended on March 12, 2021.

=== Music ===
The theme song for Shameless is "The Luck You Got" by indie rock group The High Strung. The majority of the music featured in the series is from indie rock bands. The pilot episode used music from artists such as Cream, Spoon, Say Hi, 3OH!3, The Vines, The Moog, and LMFAO. The show has also featured music from Let's Wrestle, Eels, The Blue Van, Cake, Jimmy Eat World, Alien Crime Syndicate, Capital Cities, Future Islands, The Fleeting Ends, Witchrider and Johnny Foreigner.

In promotion for the second-season premiere, the entire cast sang their own version of a Christmas carol, entitled "Shameless: Christmas Carol".

== Broadcast ==
Shameless premiered on January 9, 2011, in the United States, becoming Showtime's highest-rated series debut on record across the network's target demographic. The first episode of the series generated 982,000 unique viewers and was Showtime's largest audience for a series premiere since Dead Like Me in 2003.

The fourth episode, "Casey Casden", airing January 30, posted 1.45 million total viewers. Shameless was the cable channel's best-performing first-year drama. Defying the usual downward trend following a premiere, the series built on its initial audience, becoming number one in its time slot among adults aged 18 through 49. Subsequent episodes' audiences fluctuated between a million and 1.14 million viewers. The March 27, 2021 season finale, "Father Frank, Full of Grace," drew an audience of 1.157 million.

The third season's premiere episode, "El Gran Cañon" (airing January 13, 2013), drew 2 million viewers, becoming the show's highest rated episode to date. It then maintained average ratings of just below a million viewers throughout the remainder of its episodes.

== Reception ==
=== Critical reception ===
Tim Goodman of The Hollywood Reporter said that "Shameless is excellent, compelling television from the first moment. As long as it stays true to the roots of the original, it's going to be essential viewing". The show's first season score on Metacritic is a 66 of 100, which is a generally favorable review. The second season score on Metacritic is a 76 of 100, indicating increasingly favorable reviews. Tom O'Neill of the Los Angeles Times reported on the Emmy buzz about Shameless, especially with respect to the performance of Emmy Rossum. He said "she didn't have much Emmy buzz after Shameless debuted in January, but that changed after she gave powerhouse turns in such episodes as 'But at Last Came a Knock'". BuddyTV ranked Shameless #8 on its list of 2011's best new TV shows. Review aggregator Rotten Tomatoes gave the first season a 'fresh' rating of 70% based on 37 reviews, with the critical consensus "Shameless is a dark, urban dramedy that overcomes its leaps of logic thanks to fantastic casting, intriguing ambiance, and shock value." Seasons 2–8 each have an above 90% rating as of 2021, with the exception of season 7, which has an 88% rating. Seasons 9, 10, and 11 have the lowest ratings with 73%, 20%, and 70% respectively as of February 2022.

=== Ratings ===
The first episode of the series, "Pilot", was watched by 982,000 viewers, making it the network's biggest turnout for a series premiere since Dead Like Me in 2003. The episode airing January 30, "Casey Casden", received 1.45 million total viewers, making Shameless the best performing first-year drama on Showtime.

Viewership and ratings per season of Shameless
Season	Timeslot (ET)	Episodes	First aired		Last aired		Avg. viewers (millions)	Avg. 18–49 rating
Season	Timeslot (ET)	Episodes	Date	Viewers (millions)	Date	Viewers (millions)	Avg. viewers (millions)	Avg. 18–49 rating
1	Sunday 10:00 pm	12	January 9, 2011	0.98	March 27, 2011	1.16	1.03	TBD
2	Sunday 9:00 pm	12	January 8, 2012	1.58	April 1, 2012	1.45	1.36	0.72
3	Sunday 9:00 pm	12	January 13, 2013	2.00	April 7, 2013	1.82	1.65	0.81
4	Sunday 9:00 pm	12	January 12, 2014	1.69	April 6, 2014	1.93	1.71	0.82
5	Sunday 9:00 pm	12	January 11, 2015	1.77	April 5, 2015	1.55	1.58	0.71
6	Sunday 9:00 pm	12	January 10, 2016	1.44	April 3, 2016	1.63	1.56	0.64
7	Sunday 9:00 pm	12	October 2, 2016	1.24	December 18, 2016	1.72	1.42	0.54
8	Sunday 9:00 pm	12	November 5, 2017	1.86	January 28, 2018	1.73	1.50	0.54
9	Sunday 9:00 pm	14	September 9, 2018	1.31	March 10, 2019	1.35	1.04	0.36
10	Sunday 9:00 pm	12	November 10, 2019	0.76	January 26, 2020	0.92	0.85	0.24
11	Sunday 9:00 pm	12	December 6, 2020	0.70	April 11, 2021	0.70	0.58	0.13

Shameless : U.S. viewers per episode (millions)

Season	Episode number														Average
Season	1	2	3	4	5	6	7	8	9	10	11	12	13	14	Average
1	0.98	0.81	0.90	1.11	0.95	1.01	1.14	0.92	1.14	1.12	1.10	1.16	–		1.03
2	1.58	1.25	1.28	1.37	1.01	1.44	1.41	1.60	1.31	1.16	1.51	1.45	–		1.36
3	2.00	1.37	1.99	1.53	1.31	1.48	1.76	1.66	1.67	1.61	1.65	1.82	–		1.65
4	1.69	1.60	1.83	1.22	1.58	1.90	1.89	1.77	1.70	1.63	1.76	1.93	–		1.71
5	1.77	1.76	1.96	1.26	1.64	1.26	1.44	1.60	1.62	1.67	1.43	1.55	–		1.58
6	1.44	1.64	1.70	1.70	1.16	1.60	1.66	1.50	1.68	1.60	1.45	1.63	–		1.56
7	1.24	1.11	1.44	1.38	1.20	1.44	1.33	1.40	1.56	1.60	1.58	1.72	–		1.42
8	1.86	1.37	1.34	1.59	1.51	1.52	1.58	0.81	1.65	1.52	1.52	1.73	–		1.50
9	1.31	1.12	1.05	1.09	1.00	0.92	1.00	0.80	0.84	1.14	0.97	0.81	1.13	1.35	1.04
10	0.76	0.91	0.84	0.87	0.83	0.89	0.84	0.86	0.77	0.89	0.81	0.92	–		0.85
11	0.70	0.69	0.62	0.57	0.57	0.52	0.41	0.55	1.09	0.59	0.52	0.70	–		0.58

Audience measurement performed by Nielsen Media Research

=== Awards and nominations ===
Year	Award	Category	Recipient(s)	Result	Ref.
2011	Artios Awards	Outstanding Achievement in Casting Television Pilot – Drama	John Frank Levey	Nominated	
2011	Critics' Choice Television Awards	Best Actor in a Drama Series	William H. Macy	Nominated	
2011	Primetime Emmy Awards	Outstanding Guest Actress in a Drama Series	Joan Cusack	Nominated	
2011	Satellite Awards	Best Actor in a Television Series – Drama	William H. Macy	Nominated	
2012	Critics' Choice Television Awards	Best Actress in a Drama Series	Emmy Rossum	Nominated	
2012	Critics' Choice Television Awards	Best Guest Performer in a Drama Series	Chloe Webb	Nominated	
2012	GLAAD Media Awards	Outstanding Drama Series	Showtime	Nominated	
2012	Primetime Emmy Awards	Outstanding Guest Actress in a Drama Series	Joan Cusack	Nominated	
2012	PRISM Awards	Comedy Series – Substance Use Prism Award	Shameless	Won	
2012	PRISM Awards	Best Performance in a Comedy Series	William H. Macy	Won	
2012	PRISM Awards	Best Performance in a Comedy Series	Emmy Rossum	Nominated	
2013	BMI Film & TV Awards	BMI Cable Television Music Award	Fil Eisler (as iZler)	Won	
2013	Primetime Emmy Awards	Outstanding Guest Actress in a Drama Series	Joan Cusack	Nominated	
2013	Young Artist Awards	Best Performance in a TV Series Recurring Young Actor	Nicky Korba	Nominated	
2014	GLAAD Media Awards	Outstanding Drama Series	Showtime	Nominated	
2014	Young Artist Awards	Best Performance in a TV Series Guest Starring Young Actor 14–16	C.J. Berdahl	Nominated	
2014	Critics' Choice Television Awards	Best Actress in a Comedy Series	Emmy Rossum	Nominated	
2014	Critics' Choice Television Awards	Best Supporting Actor in a Comedy Series	Jeremy Allen White	Nominated	
2014	Primetime Emmy Awards	Outstanding Lead Actor in a Comedy Series	William H. Macy	Nominated	
2014	Primetime Emmy Awards	Outstanding Guest Actress in a Comedy Series	Joan Cusack	Nominated	
2014	Primetime Emmy Awards	Outstanding Stunt Coordination for a Comedy Series or Variety Program	Julie Michaels	Nominated	
2015	Satellite Awards	Best Actor in a Television Series – Musical or Comedy	William H. Macy	Nominated	
2015	Satellite Awards	Best Actress in a Television Series – Musical or Comedy	Emmy Rossum	Nominated	
2015	Golden Globe Awards	Best Actor in a Television Series – Musical or Comedy	William H. Macy	Nominated	
2015	Screen Actors Guild Awards	Outstanding Performance by a Male Actor in a Comedy Series	William H. Macy	Won	
2015	Critics' Choice Television Awards	Best Supporting Actor in a Comedy Series	Cameron Monaghan	Nominated	
2015	Primetime Emmy Awards	Outstanding Lead Actor in a Comedy Series	William H. Macy	Nominated	
2015	Primetime Emmy Awards	Outstanding Guest Actress in a Comedy Series	Joan Cusack	Won	
2015	GLAAD Media Awards	Outstanding Drama Series	Shameless	Nominated	
2016	People's Choice Awards	Favorite Premium Cable TV Actress	Emmy Rossum	Nominated	
2016	Primetime Emmy Awards	Outstanding Lead Actor in a Comedy Series	William H. Macy	Nominated	
2016	Primetime Emmy Awards	Outstanding Stunt Coordination for a Comedy Series or Variety Program	Eddie Perez	Won	
2017	Screen Actors Guild Awards	Outstanding Performance by a Male Actor in a Comedy Series	William H. Macy	Won	
2017	Primetime Emmy Awards	Outstanding Lead Actor in a Comedy Series	William H. Macy	Nominated	
2017	Primetime Emmy Awards	Outstanding Stunt Coordination for a Comedy Series or Variety Program	Eddie Perez	Won	
2018	Golden Globe Awards	Best Actor – Television Series Musical or Comedy	William H. Macy	Nominated	
2018	Screen Actors Guild Awards	Outstanding Performance by a Male Actor in a Comedy Series	William H. Macy	Won	
2018	Primetime Emmy Awards	Outstanding Lead Actor in a Comedy Series	William H. Macy	Nominated	
2018	Primetime Emmy Awards	Outstanding Stunt Coordination for a Comedy Series or Variety Program	Eddie Perez	Nominated	
2018	People's Choice Awards	The Bingeworthy Show of 2018	Shameless	Nominated	
2019	Satellite Awards	Best Actor in a Musical or Comedy Series	William H. Macy	Nominated	
2019	Shorty Awards	Best Actor	Emmy Rossum	Nominated	
2020	Primetime Emmy Awards	Outstanding Stunt Coordination for a Comedy Series or Variety Program	Eddie Perez	Won	
2021	Hollywood Critics Association TV Awards	Best Cable Series, Comedy	Shameless	Nominated	
2021	Primetime Emmy Awards	Outstanding Lead Actor in a Comedy Series	William H. Macy	Nominated	

== Home media ==
DVD release dates for Shameless
Name	Release dates			No. of episodes	Additional information
Name	Region 1	Region 2	Region 4	No. of episodes	Additional information
The Complete First Season	December 27, 2011	June 25, 2012	April 4, 2012	12	Bringing Shameless to America – A look at the process of reworking and repurposing a successful British television series for an American premium cable audience.; Bringing the Fun to Dysfunctional – Go behind-the-scenes of the show with key members of the cast and crew in this much-too-brief making-the-series featurette.; A Shameless Discussion About Sex – Rossum and co-stars Steve Howey, Justin Chatwin and Shanola Hampton have a candid chat about the sex in Shameless.; Audio Commentaries – Two commentaries are available: "Pilot" and "Frank Gallagher: Loving Husband, Devoted Father"; Deleted Scenes; Season 2 Sneak Peek – A look into season 2 of Shameless
The Complete Second Season	December 18, 2012	—N/a	February 13, 2013	12	The Complicated Life of Fiona Gallagher (featurette) – Fiona returns with a whole new host of problems, and Rossum talks about her character and the future of the Gallagher clan.; The Art of Acting Drunk (featurette) – William H. Macy takes a hard look at Frank and his future.; Behind the Scenes: Writing the Shameless Version (featurette) – A second-season roundtable chat.; A Shameless Actor Discussion – 5 Interviews between various cast members.; A Shameless Look at Season 3 – A behind-the-scenes sneak peek of the third season of Shameless.; The Shameless Christmas Carol – Music Video; Deleted Scenes
The Complete Third Season	December 17, 2013	—N/a	December 18, 2013	12	Where the Streets Have No Shame (featurette) – Go behind the scenes with the Shameless cast and crew as they prep a number of sets and streets for the third season shoot.; The Many Sides of Sheila (featurette) – Joan Cusack's character Sheila steps center stage as the actress, writer Mike O'Malley and other key members of the team discuss her development and evolution.; An Officer and a Gallagher (featurette) – The same treatment is given to Cameron Monaghan's Ian.; A Lip Off the Old Block (featurette) – Followed by Jeremy Allen White's Phillip.; Being Milkovich (featurette) – More character dissections with Noel Fisher and Emma Greenwell.; A Messy Triangle (featurette) – Lip, Karen and Mandy's... relationship.; Deleted Scenes
The Complete Fourth Season	December 30, 2014	—N/a	December 17, 2014	12	Being Gallagher (featurette); Shameless Neighbors (featurette); Deleted Scenes
The Complete Fifth Season	December 29, 2015	TBA	January 13, 2016	12	Shameless (sex) Love (featurette); Gentrify This!!! (featurette); Audio commentary; Deleted Scenes
The Complete Sixth Season	August 30, 2016	TBA	January 11, 2017	12	Running the Table: A Shameless Conversation (featurette); Shamelessly Shanola (featurette); Deleted Scenes
The Complete Seventh Season	September 26, 2017	TBA	January 10, 2018	12	Growing Up Shameless (featurette); The Shameless Politics of Frank (featurette); Deleted Scenes
The Complete Eighth Season	April 24, 2018	TBA	September 19, 2018	12	My Shameless Sister (featurette); My Shameless Mentors (featurette); Deleted Scenes
The Complete Ninth Season	April 23, 2019	TBA	May 15, 2019	14	Deleted Scenes
The Complete Tenth Season	May 12, 2020	TBA	May 20, 2020	12	Deleted Scenes
The Eleventh and Final Season	July 19, 2021	TBA	July 21, 2021	12	Deleted Scenes; The Last Call – Showtime's hour-long post-finale virtual cast reunion
The Complete Series	March 18, 2025	TBA	TBA	134	Repackaging of all the above releases.
