= I'm the Liver =

- Shameless episode
- Episode no.: Season 5 Episode 2
- Directed by: Sanaa Hamri
- Written by: Krista Vernoff
- Cinematography by: Kevin McKnight
- Editing by: Gregg Featherman
- Original release date: January 18, 2015
- Running time: 54 minutes

Guest appearances
- Joan Cusack as Sheila Jackson; Dermot Mulroney as Sean Pierce; Steve Kazee as Gus Pfender; Alessandra Balazs as Jackie Scabello; Emma Greenwell as Mandy Milkovich; Isidora Goreshter as Svetlana; Patrick Fischler as Wade Shelton; Axle Whitehead as Davis; Shel Bailey as Kenyatta; Stacy Edwards as Laura Shelton; Nolan Freeman as Sully; Brad Grunberg as Tim; Michael Patrick McGill as Tommy; David St. James as Pastor; Danika Yarosh as Holly Herkimer

Episode chronology
← Previous "Milk of the Gods"	Next → "The Two Lisas"
- Shameless season 5

"I'm the Liver" is the second episode of the fifth season of the American television comedy drama Shameless, an adaptation of the British series of the same name. It is the 50th overall episode of the series and was written by co-executive producer Krista Vernoff and directed by Sanaa Hamri. It originally aired on Showtime on January 18, 2015.

The series is set on the South Side of Chicago, Illinois, and depicts the poor, dysfunctional family of Frank Gallagher, a neglectful single father of six: Fiona, Phillip, Ian, Debbie, Carl, and Liam. He spends his days drunk, high, or in search of money, while his children need to learn to take care of themselves. In the episode, Frank and Sheila try to avoid Sammi, while Fiona considers a relationship with Sean.

According to Nielsen Media Research, the episode was seen by an estimated 1.76 million household viewers and gained a 0.8 ratings share among adults aged 18–49. The episode received positive reviews from critics, although some expressed mixed reactions over the multiple storylines.

== Plot ==
Frank (William H. Macy) starts distributing his beer; while some initially dislike it, they are willing to pay for it. Fiona (Emmy Rossum) is enthusiastic as her house arrest is finally ending. Despite having to wait one more day, she decides to remove her ankle monitor with tools at the house.

For Father's Day, Sammi (Emily Bergl) wants to make a special dinner for Frank, but he is uninterested. Later, Sheila (Joan Cusack) reveals to Frank that lesbian land developers want to buy her house for double the price and she is strongly considering it. Frank refuses, but Sheila claims they could travel around the country and flee from Sammi. At her job, Fiona confronts a customer for her small tip, and Sean (Dermot Mulroney) defends her and gets the customer to properly pay her. Later, Fiona serves a table of band members. One of them, Davis (Axle Whitehead), takes an interest in Fiona and gives her two tickets for their concert.

Lip (Jeremy Allen White) starts working at the construction in the neighborhood, but is surprised by the immense amount of work he must do. At the park, Kevin (Steve Howey) runs into Svetlana (Isidora Goreshter), and she helps him in breastfeeding his children after Veronica (Shanola Hampton) refuses to. Svetlana ends up cutting Kevin's long hair to prevent the babies from pulling on it; she also helps Debbie (Emma Kenney) get a makeover to help attract boys. Upon returning home, Veronica is angered to discover Kevin's haircut. Frank and Sheila attend a dinner held by the Sheltons, a married couple whose deceased son's organs were donated to Frank and other recipients. Sammi ends up crashing the dinner, infuriating Sheila. That night, Sheila confronts Sammi for being a poor role model towards Chuckie, and advises Sammi to better herself.

Ian (Cameron Monaghan) and Mickey (Noel Fisher) attend a funeral for one of Ian's military colleagues. During the funeral, an anti-LGBT group protests, and Ian almost attacks them until Mickey stops him, fearing that the attention might reveal Ian's fake ID. They then devise a plan where Mandy (Emma Greenwell) seduces a homophobic priest to give him oral sex, only to be instead performed by a man. Ian and Mickey take pictures of the priest and post them online to ruin his reputation. Fiona invites Sean to the concert, starting to develop feelings for him. Sean explains that while he is also attracted to Fiona, he is unable to move forward as he feels she is "dangerous" and a "chaos junkie." This prompts Fiona to take Debbie instead. When Fiona fights with a man who flirts with Debbie, Davis gets off stage to punch the man, while Fiona and Debbie run away.

== Production ==
The episode was written by co-executive producer Krista Vernoff and directed by Sanaa Hamri. It was Vernoff's third writing credit, and Hamri's fourth directing credit.

== Reception ==
=== Viewers ===
In its original American broadcast, "I'm the Liver" was seen by an estimated 1.76 million household viewers with a 0.8 in the 18–49 demographics. This means that 0.8 percent of all households with televisions watched the episode. This was a slight decrease in viewership from the previous episode, which was seen by an estimated 1.77 million household viewers with a 0.8 in the 18–49 demographics.

=== Critical reviews ===
"I'm the Liver" received positive reviews from critics. Joshua Alston of The A.V. Club gave the episode a "B" grade and wrote, ""I'm The Liver" is a less-than-perfect Shameless episode in the way Shameless episodes are most often less-than-perfect, a result of the show seeming to always know exactly what to do with Fiona all the time, and having a more tenuous grasp on what to do with all of its other characters."

Allyson Johnson of The Young Folks gave the episode a 7 out of 10 rating and wrote "A solid, entertaining episode, but one that suffers from the typical pitfalls of having so many characters. Also, Debbie's storyline continues to concern me."

David Crow of Den of Geek gave the episode a 4 star rating out of 5 and wrote, "everybody else is changing in the Gallagher clan — or at least trying to — save for Frank. The irony is that he is the one who has changed the most on paper, including with a new marriage and a new liver that both forbid him from excessively drinking. And that paradox is possibly the best thing Shameless season five has going for at the moment." Whitney Evans of TV Fanatic gave the episode a 4 star rating out of 5, and wrote, "It always seems like Shameless needs a few episodes each season to get going. They need to plant their storylines and get the characters in the right positions for the season. And while these first two episodes haven't exactly been the best, they've been solid."
