= Tell Me You Fucking Need Me =

- Shameless episode
- Episode no.: Season 5 Episode 7
- Directed by: William H. Macy
- Written by: Nancy M. Pimental
- Cinematography by: Kevin McKnight
- Editing by: Gregg Featherman
- Original release date: March 1, 2015
- Running time: 51 minutes

Guest appearances
- Justin Chatwin as Jimmy Lishman; Steve Kazee as Gus Pfender; Vanessa Bell Calloway as Carol Fisher; Isidora Goreshter as Svetlana; Dichen Lachman as Angela; Luca Oriel as Derek Delgado; Michael B. Silver as Lorenzo; Susan Chuang as Kathy Beard; Wayne Federman as Norman; Michael Patrick McGill as Tommy; Rebecca Metz as Melinda; Kellen Michael as Chuckie Slott; Lee Simpson as Roger; Danika Yarosh as Holly Herkimer

Episode chronology
← Previous "Crazy Love"	Next → "Uncle Carl"
- Shameless season 5

"Tell Me You Fucking Need Me" is the seventh episode of the fifth season of the American television comedy drama Shameless, an adaptation of the British series of the same name. It is the 55th overall episode of the series and was written by executive producer Nancy M. Pimental and directed by main cast member William H. Macy. It originally aired on Showtime on March 1, 2015.

The series is set on the South Side of Chicago, Illinois, and depicts the poor, dysfunctional family of Frank Gallagher, a neglectful single father of six: Fiona, Phillip, Ian, Debbie, Carl, and Liam. He spends his days drunk, high, or in search of money, while his children need to learn to take care of themselves. In the episode, Fiona debates over her future with Gus or Jimmy, while Frank tries to challenge Sammi. The episode marked the final appearance of Justin Chatwin in the series.

According to Nielsen Media Research, the episode was seen by an estimated 1.44 million household viewers and gained a 0.6 ratings share among adults aged 18–49. The episode received generally positive reviews from critics, who praised the closure to Jimmy's character arc.

== Plot ==
Fiona (Emmy Rossum) reveals to Gus (Steve Kazee) that she slept with Jimmy (Justin Chatwin). A shaken Gus is confused by the revelation, and leaves their apartment. With school starting, Sammi (Emily Bergl) demands Carl (Ethan Cutkosky) take Chuckie (Kellen Michael) to school while at school Carl decides to protect Chuckie from bullies who get beat up by Carl who later gets detention on the first day of school for bullying and pushing Chuckie.

As Ian (Cameron Monaghan) struggles in the psych ward, Mickey (Noel Fisher) gets into an argument with Svetlana (Isidora Goreshter), who fears Yevgeny's safety and wants Ian out when he is released. Mickey proceeds to kick her out of the house, after which she moves in with Kevin (Steve Howey). Seeing his situation, Svetlana decides to help in babysitting his children and pays him by providing him oral sex. In college, Lip (Jeremy Allen White) cannot find his class schedule. After waiting in a long line, he discovers he lost it because he did not pay his tuition. After making another long line to ask for financial aid, Lip discovers he did not fill out his financial aid papers, and is forced to take different credit cards to withdraw $5,000 and cover part of the initial debt.

After Frank (William H. Macy) refuses to leave the house, Sammi pays city workers to get him out and put his sofa in the street. Debbie (Emma Kenney) is confused over how to get Derek (Luca Oriel) to fall in love with her. She eventually confronts him, and he kisses her, revealing he is also in love with her. Chuckie makes the rest of the school respect him. While in detention, Carl sneaks into detention monitor's purse and steals condoms and nunchucks although he also gets Chuckie to work as his slave. That night, as Frank, Debbie and Carl dine, Lip arrives, angry that they never informed him about the financial aid papers. When Frank makes a sarcastic comment mocking Sammi, she reaches her breaking point and pulls out a gun. When Frank mocks her again, Sammi surprises everyone by shooting him in the arm. She then makes him admit he loves her and needs her, after which she proceeds to take him to the hospital.

When Fiona and Mickey visit Ian at the ward, Ian ignores their questions, distracted by everything in the area. Later, Gus surprises Fiona by asking to meet Jimmy. When she introduces him at Patsy's, Gus punches him and storms off, telling Fiona he deserves someone better than Jimmy. Fiona and Jimmy then talk; Jimmy was set to leave for Dubai, but he is ready to call it off just to be with Fiona. While tempted, Fiona tells Jimmy that he needs to let her let him go. Jimmy then leaves in his motorcycle. Later, Fiona runs into Angela (Dichen Lachman), and discovers that "Jack" only stayed because his boss canceled the trip to Dubai.

== Production ==
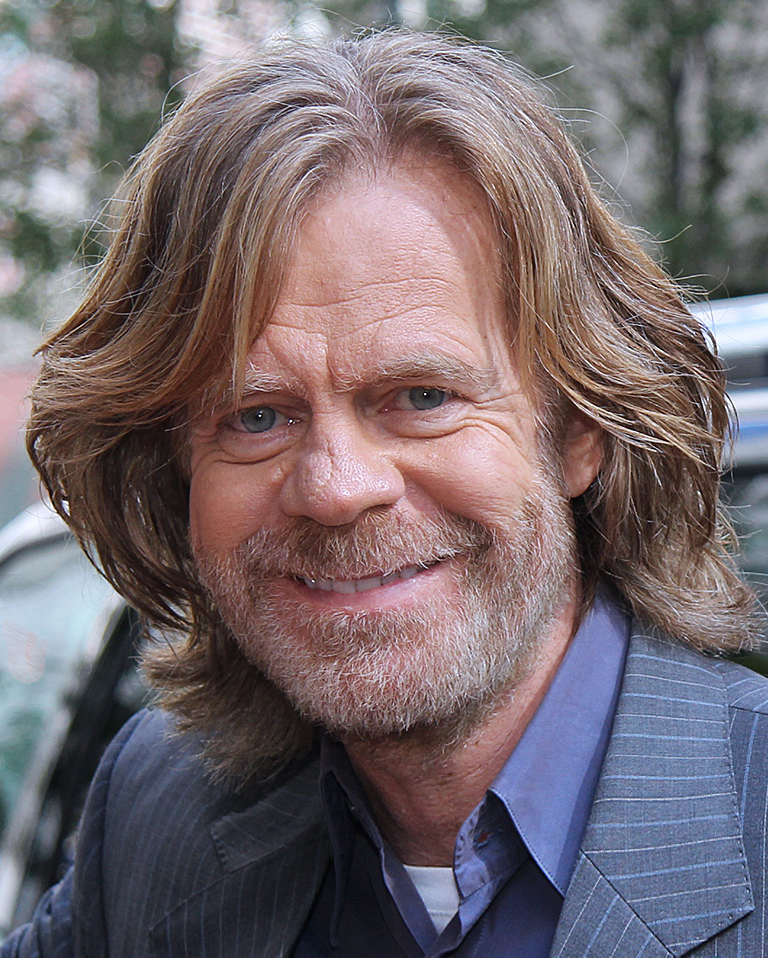
The episode was directed by William H. Macy.

The episode was written by executive producer Nancy M. Pimental and directed by main cast member William H. Macy. It was Pimental's 13th writing credit, and Macy's first directing credit.

== Reception ==
=== Viewers ===
In its original American broadcast, "Tell Me You Fucking Need Me" was seen by an estimated 1.44 million household viewers with a 0.6 in the 18–49 demographics. This means that 0.6 percent of all households with televisions watched the episode. This was a 14 percent increase in viewership from the previous episode, which was seen by an estimated 1.26 million household viewers with a 0.5 in the 18–49 demographics.

=== Critical reviews ===
"Tell Me You Fucking Need Me" received generally positive reviews from critics. Joshua Alston of The A.V. Club gave the episode a "B–" grade and wrote, "It seemed like Shameless had mostly kicked its habit of making the most shocking or unexpected story choice, even when it doesn't feel like the most satisfying one. Everything about Jimmy's return has been designed to deliver the biggest gotcha possible, but beyond the element of surprise, Jimmy hasn't added much of value. "Tell Me You Fucking Need Me" was yet another episode functioning as a Jimmy-Steve-Jack-in-the-box, but the surprise this time was simply in how abruptly the story petered out."

Virginia Podesta of TV Overmind wrote "This was yet another fulfilling episode of Shameless, a show that has never lost steam and has had the audience willingly jump on this crazy train of a show from the get-go. High and lows are always on the menu, yet we care so much for the characters that we stay on."

David Crow of Den of Geek gave the episode a 4 star rating out of 5 and wrote, "At this point, I no longer think Jimmy will be Shameless' endgame for Fiona. No, he's the shark lying just off Amity Beach, waiting to pull the community into chaos again. If it makes for episodes as good as the last three, he's always welcome back no matter what Fiona says." Whitney Evans of TV Fanatic gave the episode a 4 star rating out of 5, and wrote, "It sure did seem like it was really over for Fiona and Jimmy/Steve, but I have my doubts. Bringing him back at the end of Shameless Season 4 was such a big surprise and for this to be his real swan song would be a bit of letdown."
