= The Two Lisas =

- Shameless episode
- Episode no.: Season 5 Episode 3
- Directed by: Peter Segal
- Written by: Sheila Callaghan
- Cinematography by: Kevin McKnight
- Editing by: Tim Tommasino
- Original release date: January 25, 2015
- Running time: 53 minutes

Guest appearances
- Joan Cusack as Sheila Jackson; Steve Kazee as Gus Pfender; Alessandra Balazs as Jackie Scabello; JB Blanc as Hanzi; Vanessa Bell Calloway as Carol Fisher; Emma Greenwell as Mandy Milkovich; Dichen Lachman as Angela; James Allen McCune as Matty Baker; Axle Whitehead as Davis; Jenica Bergere as Lisa #1; Lily Holleman as Lisa #2; Shel Bailey as Kenyatta; Michael Hyatt as Officer Pimental; Michael Patrick McGill as Tommy; Mia Serafino as Gigi; Danika Yarosh as Holly Herkimer

Episode chronology
← Previous "I'm the Liver"	Next → "A Night to Remem... Wait, What?"
- Shameless season 5

"The Two Lisas" is the third episode of the fifth season of the American television comedy drama Shameless, an adaptation of the British series of the same name. It is the 51st overall episode of the series and was written by supervising producer Sheila Callaghan and directed by Peter Segal. It originally aired on Showtime on January 25, 2015.

The series is set on the South Side of Chicago, Illinois, and depicts the poor, dysfunctional family of Frank Gallagher, a neglectful single father of six: Fiona, Phillip, Ian, Debbie, Carl, and Liam. He spends his days drunk, high, or in search of money, while his children need to learn to take care of themselves. In the episode, Frank tries to convince Sheila to not sell her house, while Debbie throws a party to attract Matty. The episode marked the final appearance of Joan Cusack in the series.

According to Nielsen Media Research, the episode was seen by an estimated 1.96 million household viewers and gained a 0.9 ratings share among adults aged 18–49. The episode received highly positive reviews from critics, particularly for Sheila's subplot, although critics were divided over Debbie's storyline.

== Plot ==
Fiona (Emmy Rossum) once again meets with Davis (Axle Whitehead) to discuss the events at the concert. They decide to attend another one together. Mickey (Noel Fisher) and Ian (Cameron Monaghan) are shocked to discover that Mandy (Emma Greenwell) plans to leave with Kenyatta (Shen Bailey) for Indiana.

Frank (William H. Macy) tries to sell his beer at the Alibi Room, to little success. However, a veteran asks for six cases for an upcoming meeting, forcing Frank to quickly create more at his basement. In exchange for new brewery equipment, Frank sets the owner of a junkyard up with Sammi (Emily Bergl) under the pretense that she'll sleep with him. He also gets Carl (Ethan Cutkosky) to threaten the lesbian land developers, both named Lisa, by intimidating them into believing the neighborhood does not want them. For this, Carl moves a sign to their street, causing their car to be towed. One of them later visits Carl, warning him they know he is involved and that they aren't intimidated.

Wanting to impress Matty (James Allen McCune), Debbie (Emma Kenney) decides to throw a party at her house, taking a case of Frank's beer. Matty falls unconscious, and Debbie has sex with him. Debbie is delighted over her actions, unaware that she has raped him. The following morning, Matty confronts Debbie for initiating the sexual encounter, deeming it date rape. He then cuts off ties with her, asking her not to call him. Fiona and Davis go to a bar, but when his girlfriend shows up, Fiona makes a play for his bass player, Gus (Steve Kazee). Lip (Jeremy Allen White) is asked by Ian to try and convince Mandy to stay. Lip and Mandy have sex, but Lip does not reciprocate when Mandy confesses her love for him. They make plans to eat breakfast the following day, but Lip is disappointed to discover she had already left with Kenyatta.

Sheila (Joan Cusack) rents an RV in hopes of travelling the world. Frank finally gets her to slow down by claiming he can accompany her on a little vacation and then renew his wedding vows; a relieved Sheila decides to not sell the house. However, Sammi is enraged upon learning that Frank set her up with the junkyard owner for sex and confronts him. Sheila tries to stop the fight outside, while the man stays in the basement to try Frank's beer. Reaching his breaking point, Frank scolds both women, criticizing Sammi for her clingy attitude and lashing out at Sheila for her lifestyle and mentality. The beer's propane suddenly explodes, destroying Sheila's house and killing the man. Just then, the RV owner arrives and exits to see the wreckage; Sheila steals the RV and drives off despite Frank's protests. The episode concludes with a euphoric Sheila leaving Chicago, finally accomplishing her dream to travel the world.

== Production ==
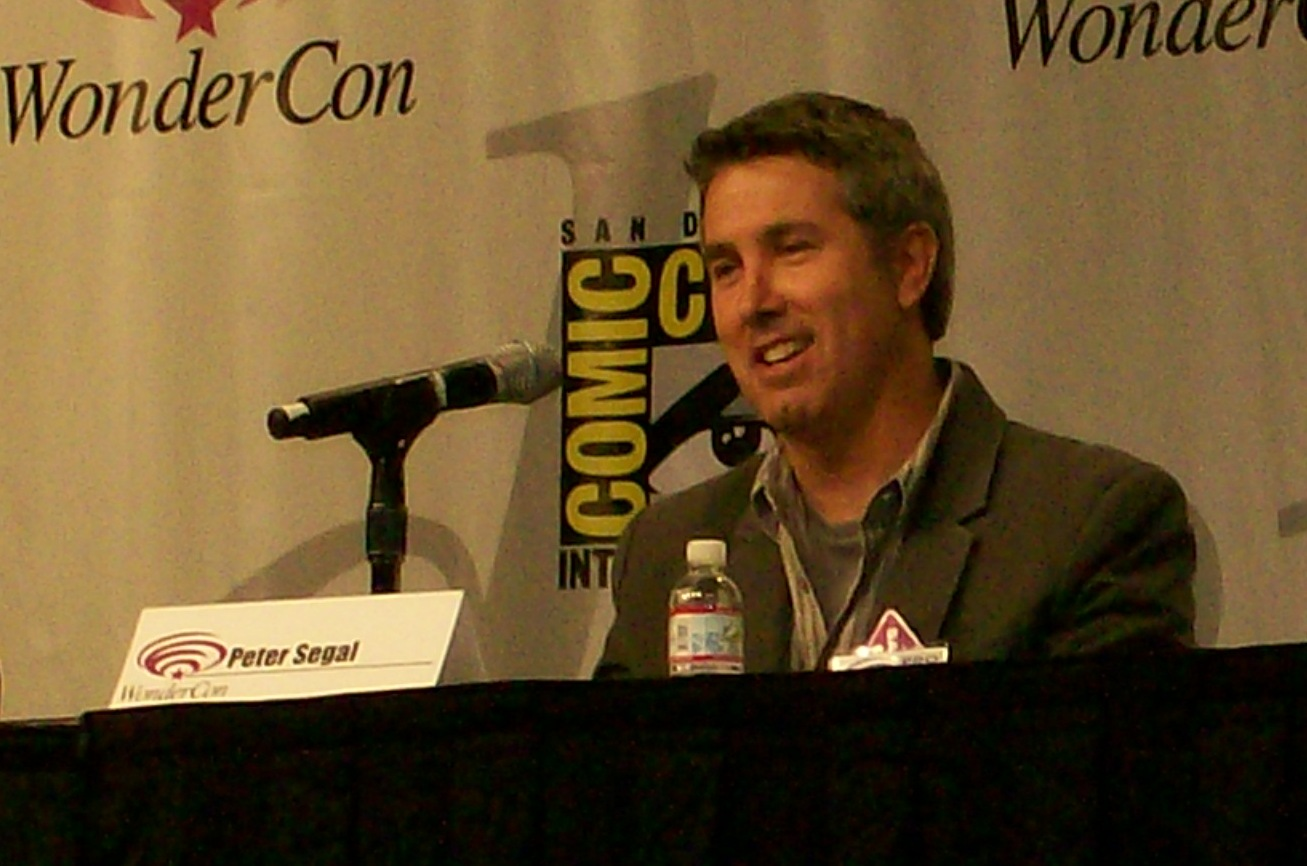
The episode was directed by Peter Segal.

The episode was written by supervising producer Sheila Callaghan and directed by Peter Segal. It was Callaghan's fifth writing credit, and Segal's second directing credit.

== Reception ==
=== Viewers ===
In its original American broadcast, "The Two Lisas" was seen by an estimated 1.96 million household viewers with a 0.9 in the 18–49 demographics. This means that 0.9 percent of all households with televisions watched the episode. This was a 11 percent increase in viewership from the previous episode, which was seen by an estimated 1.76 million household viewers with a 0.8 in the 18–49 demographics.

=== Critical reviews ===
"The Two Lisas" received generally positive reviews from critics. Joshua Alston of The A.V. Club gave the episode a "B+" grade and commended the decision to write off Sheila, writing "Shameless has so many characters that even those you care about most have moments when they feel superfluous. I was shocked last year when Ian's absence early in the season went over so smoothly. And when the most prominent characters can disappear for episodes at a time, the less essential characters feel especially unnecessary. 'The Two Lisas' works towards pruning the Shameless family tree, which is a good move for the show's overall health." Alston was polarized over Debbie's storyline in the episode, stating "It was a story I think I'll be processing for a few weeks before I have a firm grasp on how I feel about it. It's bold, that much is certain."

David Crow of Den of Geek gave the episode a 3 star rating out of 5. Crow was also polarized over the Debbie storyline, arguing that the plot made sense in the context of Debbie's character, but questioning the writers' handling on the subject of sexual assault: "I view Debbie taking matters into her own hands with a very intoxicated Matty as par for the course with the character. With all that said, Shameless did just turn rape—with the knotty addition of self-statutory rape, as the show helpfully points out—into one hell of an intended joke." Allyson Johnson of The Young Folks was also critical of the writers' handling of the subject matter, writing "Plot lines that involve sexual assault aren’t inherently bad as long as the creative team behind it knows how to handle it with a deft hand and it would seem that Shameless has followed suit of so many other shows that just shouldn’t have taken on the storyline in the first place. It all reads a bit too much like a shock value tactic than anything more poignant."

Alan Sepinwall's review for HitFix was more positive regarding Debbie's storyline, praising the tonal shift between the dark and emotional elements: "Yes, Debbie unwittingly rapes Matty [...] but then it leads to a sincere and honest discussion between Debbie and Fiona about sex, and how little Debbie really knows about it, and it doesn't feel like a cheat or an attempt to back away from the implications of what happened earlier. That's a hard tonal shift to pull off without seeming jarring, yet the show does it often – albeit usually not starting with something quite as extreme as this." Whitney Evans of TV Fanatic gave the episode a 4.5 star rating out of 5 and praised the episode's dramatic content, writing "People like to lump this show into the dramedy category, but I've always considered it to be much more of a drama than comedy. And 'The Two Lisas,' while providing some earnest laughs, was heavy on the drama. Personally that's how I like my Shameless. Things are always elevated to another level when the characters get to go beyond the jokes and show different sides of themselves."
