= Rite of Passage (Shameless) =

- Shameless episode
- Episode no.: Season 5 Episode 5
- Directed by: Alex Graves
- Written by: Etan Frankel
- Cinematography by: Kevin McKnight
- Editing by: Tim Tommasino
- Original release date: February 8, 2015
- Running time: 51 minutes

Guest appearances
- Dermot Mulroney as Sean Pierce; Steve Kazee as Gus Pfender; Justin Chatwin as Jimmy Lishman; Alessandra Balazs as Jackie Scabello; Alan Blumenfeld as Neil; Stacy Edwards as Laura Shelton; Patrick Fischler as Wade Shelton; Dichen Lachman as Angela; Luca Oriel as Derek Delgado; Nolan Freeman as Sully; Michael Patrick McGill as Tommy; Teresa Ornelas as Ellie; J. Michael Trautmann as Iggy Milkovich; Janet Varney as Park Mom; Danika Yarosh as Holly Herkimer

Episode chronology
← Previous "A Night to Remem... Wait, What?"	Next → "Crazy Love"
- Shameless season 5

"Rite of Passage" is the fifth episode of the fifth season of the American television comedy drama Shameless, an adaptation of the British series of the same name. It is the 53rd overall episode of the series and was written by co-executive producer Etan Frankel and directed by Alex Graves. It originally aired on Showtime on February 8, 2015.

The series is set on the South Side of Chicago, Illinois, and depicts the poor, dysfunctional family of Frank Gallagher, a neglectful single father of six: Fiona, Phillip, Ian, Debbie, Carl, and Liam. He spends his days drunk, high, or in search of money, while his children need to learn to take care of themselves. In the episode, Frank tries to find a new home, while Fiona tries to help a co-worker with a crisis.

According to Nielsen Media Research, the episode was seen by an estimated 1.64 million household viewers and gained a 0.7 ratings share among adults aged 18–49. The episode received generally positive reviews from critics, who praised the humor and performances, although some considered the episode as aimless.

== Plot ==
Frank (William H. Macy) sleeps back at the Gallagher household, but he sets out to find a new home. Sammi (Emily Bergl), believing that Frank has not collected his insurance money, deduces that Frank will buy her a new trailer home after her previous one is impounded. Frank lies to her, claiming he will give her another one.

At her job, Fiona (Emmy Rossum) adjusts to her new life as a married woman. She bonds with one of her co-workers, Jackie (Alessandra Balazs), a recovering drug addict who is fighting to get custody of her daughter. When Jackie misses an appointment, Fiona and Sean (Dermot Mulroney) visit her at her apartment, only to discover that she overdosed on drugs. She is taken to the hospital, and Gus (Steve Kazee) consoles Fiona over the recent events. Lip (Jeremy Allen White) continues working at the construction site, but later agrees to help Mickey (Noel Fisher) in gunfiring a coffee shop. Disappointed that Lip did not pull his trigger, Mickey abandons him just as the police arrive, forcing Lip to flee.

Feeling guilty over "cheating" on Kevin (Steve Howey), Veronica (Shanola Hampton) decides that it should be fair that Kevin cheats on her to call it even. Kevin gets a handjob from a woman, but he feels guilty. Veronica, despite being the one who suggested the encounter, is not satisfied either. This leads to another argument, and Kevin walks out to tend to his children. Desperate to find a place, Frank visits Wade (Patrick Fischler) and Laura Shelton (Stacy Edwards). Wade is willing to let him stay because he feels "David" is still within Frank, but Laura is not content. Later, Frank opens up to Laura over his problems, and they end up having sex. With her new boxing skills, Debbie (Emma Kenney) brutally beats Holly (Danika Yarosh) and Ellie (Teresa Ornelas). Fiona finally reveals her marriage to Lip, who congratulates her.

When Sammi visits Debbie, she discovers that Frank lied about the new trailer home. She confronts him at the Shelton household, and she almost stabs him. As Frank flees, Laura reveals to her husband that she had sex with Frank. Mickey is furious upon learning that Ian (Cameron Monaghan) decided to make a pornographic scene after a producer approached him at the club. Realizing he has gone too far, Mickey tells him he will enroll him at a psychiatric hospital. Ian instead flees in the car, taking Yevgeny with him. At her job, Fiona has a conversation with Gus and they agree to move forward from the tragedy. After he leaves, Fiona tends once again to Angela (Dichen Lachman), but is surprised by her companion: Jimmy (Justin Chatwin).

== Production ==
The episode was written by co-executive producer Etan Frankel and directed by Alex Graves. It was Frankel's eighth writing credit, and Graves' second directing credit.

== Reception ==
=== Viewers ===
In its original American broadcast, "Rite of Passage" was seen by an estimated 1.64 million household viewers with a 0.7 in the 18–49 demographics. This means that 0.7 percent of all households with televisions watched the episode. This was a 30% increase in viewership from the previous episode, which was seen by an estimated 1.26 million household viewers with a 0.6 in the 18–49 demographics.

=== Critical reviews ===
"Rite of Passage" received generally positive reviews from critics. David Crow of Den of Geek gave the episode a perfect 5 star rating out of 5 and wrote, "I somehow suspect that we all knew Jimmy was coming back eventually (and for some, even this season). Yet, the way he appeared in tonight's Shameless still had my jaw drop, and it was very, very Jimmy — as in inconsiderate, selfish, and bad timing." Crow was also largely positive regarding Frank's storyline, writing "Frank’s unabashed manipulation of a man clearly in deep grief and denial, such as wearing David’s baseball jersey and trying to play catch, walks the thin line between hilarious and uncomfortably crass. This is the kind of inspired thoughtless cruelty that makes Frank Gallagher one of our favorite television protagonists of all time, as well as plays to all of William H. Macy’s strengths."

Allyson Johnson of The Young Folks gave the episode a 7.5 out of 10 rating. Johnson commended the performances in the episode, particularly Emmy Rossum, Jeremy Allen White and Noel Fisher. Commenting on Rossum's portrayal of Fiona, Johnson wrote "Rossum has been doing such strong work for majority of the show, that you’d think she’d used up all of her surprises. Her face at Jimmy’s reappearance was about five different emotions at once all spilling out of her eyes and again, I can’t hate Jimmy if that’s the acting he’ll elicit out of the show’s star player." Whitney Evans of TV Fanatic gave the episode a 4 star rating out of 5, praising the re-introduction of Jimmy's character: "My prayers have been answered! Jimmy/Steve has finally returned to the Shameless family and it couldn't have come at a better time."

Joshua Alston's review for The A.V. Club was largely mixed. Alston gave the episode a "B–" grade and wrote, ""Rites Of Passage" represents the show at its most aimless. The episode feels especially scattered as it builds up to the long-awaited return of Jimmy-Jack-Steve. I've gone to no effort to mask my exasperation with JJS and my annoyance with the character's return, but even I couldn't wait for him to reappear, given the season has felt like its emergency brake is on. As an injection of new energy goes, JJS is not ideal, but at least the writers are now moving ahead with whatever the plan is for him."
