= A Night to Remem... Wait, What? =

- Shameless episode
- Episode no.: Season 5 Episode 4
- Directed by: Richie Keen
- Written by: Davey Holmes
- Cinematography by: Kevin McKnight
- Editing by: Gregg Featherman
- Original release date: February 1, 2015
- Running time: 52 minutes

Guest appearances
- Dermot Mulroney as Sean Pierce; Steve Kazee as Gus Pfender; Alessandra Balazs as Jackie Scabello; Isidora Goreshter as Svetlana; Nichole Sakura as Amanda; Axle Whitehead as Davis; Ian Kahn as Jason; Luca Oriel as Derek Delgado; Alex Borstein as Lou Deckner; Dante Brown as Jerome; Suzanne Cryer as Cheryl; Jim Hoffmaster as Kermit; Adam Kulbersh as Bank Manager; Sam Lloyd as Buddy Diamond; Rebecca Metz as Melinda; Michael Patrick McGill as Tommy; Stephen Rider as G-Dog; Danika Yarosh as Holly Herkimer

Episode chronology
← Previous "The Two Lisas"	Next → "Rite of Passage"
- Shameless season 5

"A Night to Remem... Wait, What?" is the fourth episode of the fifth season of the American television comedy drama Shameless, an adaptation of the British series of the same name. It is the 52nd overall episode of the series and was written by executive producer Davey Holmes and directed by Richie Keen. It originally aired on Showtime on February 1, 2015.

The series is set on the South Side of Chicago, Illinois, and depicts the poor, dysfunctional family of Frank Gallagher, a neglectful single father of six: Fiona, Phillip, Ian, Debbie, Carl, and Liam. He spends his days drunk, high, or in search of money, while his children need to learn to take care of themselves. In the episode, a hungover Frank tries to remember the events of the prior night, while Fiona receives a surprising proposal from Gus.

According to Nielsen Media Research, the episode was seen by an estimated 1.26 million household viewers and gained a 0.6 ratings share among adults aged 18–49. The episode received mixed-to-positive reviews from critics, many of whom were divided over Frank's central storyline. For the episode, William H. Macy received a nomination for Outstanding Lead Actor in a Comedy Series at the 67th Primetime Emmy Awards.

== Plot ==
A hungover Frank (William H. Macy) wakes up in a bench, with no memory of the past day. Frank visits Lou Deckner (Alex Borstein) to pick up his six figure insurance settlement, but Lou reveals he already got it the prior day. Realizing he has no idea where he kept the money, Frank starts retracing his steps.

Lip (Jeremy Allen White) arrives in Miami to join Amanda (Nichole Sakura) and her family. While her parents still oppose their relationship, they take him in as a guest. Later, Amanda's father surprises Lip by offering him a paid internship for him, and even shares a marijuana joint with him. Debbie (Emma Kenney) is attacked by Holly (Danika Yarosh) when rumors about her date rape spreads around school, only to be defended by a boy named Derek (Luca Oriel). Fascinated by his boxing knowledge, Debbie decides to enroll in his gym to learn self-defense. Carl (Ethan Cutkosky) starts getting involved into drug dealing, where his leg injury helps him earn money.

Fiona (Emmy Rossum) continues her relationship with Gus (Steve Kazee), often missing shifts at her job to have sex. After nine days of dating, Gus suggests they could get married. While surprised by the suggestion, Fiona ultimately accepts and they get a civil wedding. Gus proudly announces it at her job, which concerns Sean (Dermot Mulroney). Ian (Cameron Monaghan) goes overboard when he starts stealing suitcases from the airport baggage claim, and Mickey (Noel Fisher) is shocked to find his house filled with suitcases. Kevin (Steve Howey) and Veronica (Shanola Hampton) experience discussions in their marriage, particularly for Kevin's annoyance that Veronica does not pay much attention to her children. However, Veronica feels guilty when she experiences an orgasm while grinding with another man at a dance club; she realizes how much she misses Kevin's attention.

Frank discovers that after spending $1,000 on the Alibi Room, he bought an expensive Porsche. Subsequently, he gambled the rest of the money, earning twice the money he got. He then left with three women for a hotel, where he spent an insane amount of money on drugs and then gave the rest of the money to an entrepreneur named Buddy Diamond (Sam Lloyd). When Frank visits him, Buddy states that Frank donated money to extensive prosthetic equipment for children. Later, Frank is attacked by hotel valets, as he ran over one of them the prior night. Unable to pay his medical bills, Frank is forced to give them his Porsche to settle his debt. Dejected, he shares his bottle of wine with Carl.

== Production ==
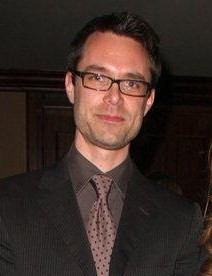
The episode was written by Davey Holmes.

The episode was written by executive producer Davey Holmes and directed by Richie Keen. It was Holmes' fourth writing credit, and Keen's first directing credit.

== Reception ==
=== Viewers ===
In its original American broadcast, "A Night to Remem... Wait, What?" was seen by an estimated 1.26 million household viewers with a 0.6 in the 18–49 demographics. This means that 0.6 percent of all households with televisions watched the episode. This was a 36 percent decrease in viewership from the previous episode, which was seen by an estimated 1.96 million household viewers with a 0.9 in the 18–49 demographics.

=== Critical reviews ===
"A Night to Remem... Wait, What?" received mixed-to-positive reviews from critics. Joshua Alston of The A.V. Club gave the episode a "B–" grade, and was largely critical over Frank's storyline, writing "For those less enamored of Frank, the story felt like a waste of time. It also produced one of those Shameless moments where an attempt at off-color humor doesn’t land, and rather than being funny is simply unpleasant." Alston was also mixed over the pairing of Fiona and Gus: "Gus’ presence feels unnecessary, which is a shame because Steve Kazee is adorable and has terrific chemistry with Emmy Rossum. Fiona’s wedding is the story with the most impact in [the episode] but it never feels like more than a glancing blow."

Alan Sepinwall's review for HitFix was generally positive; Sepinwall praised Fiona and Carl's storylines, but had mixed feelings over the episode's large focus on Frank, writing that the storyline "has its moments [...] but is more prolonged comedy than I think the character can sustain." Allyson Johnson of The Young Folks was largely critical of Frank's storyline, writing "This episode and my opinion of it suffers hugely because of how much Frank was on my screen. [...] Frank works in small doses and this is the rule not the exception. Episode’s never fare well when they center on Frank, no matter how good William H. Macy may be." Johnson gave the episode a 6.9 out of 10, and concluded "It was an episode that meandered and never found its footing."

David Crow of Den of Geek gave the episode a 4 star rating out of 5 and commended the comedic elements of Frank's storyline, writing "My horror and admitted laughter at seeing him try to steal that leg and run out of the office confirms what a terrible person I might be. Thank you, Frank." Whitney Evans of TV Fanatic gave the episode a 4 star rating out of 5, and wrote, "After a somber installment, they really kicked up the craziness on [this episode]."

=== Accolades ===
William H. Macy submitted the episode to support his nomination for Outstanding Lead Actor in a Comedy Series at the 67th Primetime Emmy Awards. He would lose the award to Jeffrey Tambor for Transparent.
