= Crazy Love (Shameless) =

- Shameless episode
- Episode no.: Season 5 Episode 6
- Directed by: Anthony Hemingway
- Written by: John Wells
- Cinematography by: Kevin McKnight
- Editing by: Kevin D. Ross
- Original release date: February 15, 2015
- Running time: 57 minutes

Guest appearances
- Justin Chatwin as Jimmy Lishman; Dermot Mulroney as Sean Pierce; Steve Kazee as Gus Pfender; Nichole Sakura as Amanda; Isidora Goreshter as Svetlana; Dichen Lachman as Angela; Luca Oriel as Derek Delgado; Andrew Borba as Officer Hahn; JoNell Kennedy as Dr. Giles; J. Michael Trautmann as Iggy Milkovich

Episode chronology
← Previous "Rite of Passage"	Next → "Tell Me You Fucking Need Me"
- Shameless season 5

"Crazy Love" is the sixth episode of the fifth season of the American television comedy drama Shameless, an adaptation of the British series of the same name. It is the 54th overall episode of the series and was written by series developer John Wells and directed by Anthony Hemingway. It originally aired on Showtime on February 15, 2015.

The series is set on the South Side of Chicago, Illinois, and depicts the poor, dysfunctional family of Frank Gallagher, a neglectful single father of six: Fiona, Phillip, Ian, Debbie, Carl, and Liam. He spends his days drunk, high, or in search of money, while his children need to learn to take care of themselves. In the episode, Fiona is puzzled by Jimmy's return, while Ian goes on the run with Mickey's child.

According to Nielsen Media Research, the episode was seen by an estimated 1.26 million household viewers and gained a 0.5 ratings share among adults aged 18–49. The episode received critical acclaim, with critics praising its performances (particularly Fisher and Monaghan) and emotional tone.

== Plot ==
Fiona (Emmy Rossum) confronts Jimmy (Justin Chatwin) over his disappearance, as he never communicated with her. Jimmy explains that he was forced to leave his life behind and do slave labor in Brazil. He escaped, and returned to Chicago with the help of his partner-in-crime, Angela (Dichen Lachman). Their conversation is interrupted by Mickey (Noel Fisher), who reveals that Ian (Cameron Monaghan) fled with Yegveny.

Frank (William H. Macy) moves back at the Gallagher household, but discovers that Sammi (Emily Bergl) has already moved there. In Fiona's absence, Sammi takes charge as the family's caretaker, implementing curfews for the kids and refusing to give food to Frank unless he pays for it. Lip (Jeremy Allen White) is back at college, now working as a resident assistant. Debbie (Emma Kenney), meanwhile, has started high school, and Derek (Luca Oriel) helps her intimidate bullies by talking about her new boxing skills. Veronica (Shanola Hampton) and Kevin (Steve Howey) have decided to split, shocking Fiona.

Ian has left Chicago, planning to take Yevgeny to Florida. He struggles in buying food and diapers for Yevgeny, so he makes a stop in Terre Haute, Indiana to have a sexual encounter with a man for money. However, he leaves Yevgeny in the car, and a startled woman calls the cops to save him. When Ian returns, he gets into an argument with the cops and flees with Yevgeny, before collapsing after suffering a breakdown. Jimmy visits Fiona at her home, and they reconcile and have sex. However, Fiona is shaken over having cheated on Gus (Steve Kazee). During another encounter, Fiona is unable to move forward with sex, and goes back with Gus.

Frank's condition worsens and he is taken back to the hospital. The doctor notes that his heavy use of drugs is affecting his liver and prescribes him medications, warning him that he will not get another liver. Mickey, Lip, Debbie and Carl (Ethan Cutkosky) go to Indiana to bail Ian out and take him back to Chicago. While Mickey is worried Ian will not seek help, Ian actually allows himself to be checked into a psych ward. Mickey and Ian share a hug before he is taken away by a doctor.

== Production ==
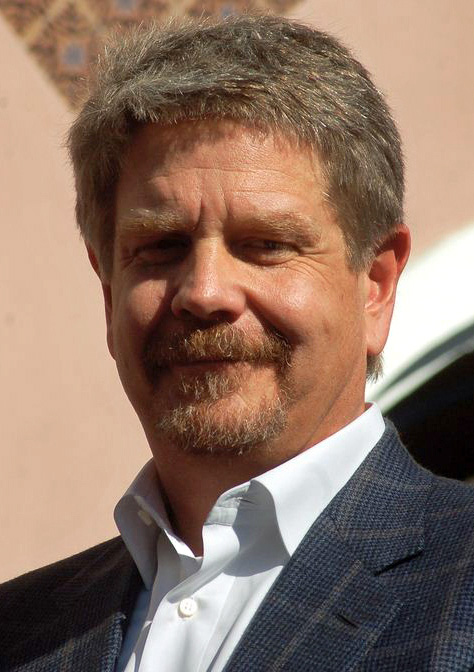
The episode was written by John Wells.

The episode was written by series developer John Wells and directed by Anthony Hemingway. It was Wells' tenth writing credit, and Hemingway's fifth directing credit.

== Reception ==
=== Viewers ===
In its original American broadcast, "Crazy Love" was seen by an estimated 1.26 million household viewers with a 0.5 in the 18–49 demographics. This means that 0.5 percent of all households with televisions watched the episode. This was a 24 percent decrease in viewership from the previous episode, which was seen by an estimated 1.64 million household viewers with a 0.7 in the 18–49 demographics.

=== Critical reviews ===
"Crazy Love" received critical acclaim. Joshua Alston of The A.V. Club gave the episode an "A–" grade and wrote, "Season five is the first season in which Wells didn't write the season premiere, and even though he's responsible for the past season premieres to lazily shuffle out of the gate, it's difficult to resist reading too far into his absence this year. Of all the seasons, this one feels the most directionless, especially given "Crazy Love" marks the halfway point. But with Wells back at the helm, the episode captures the urgency that has been lacking throughout the season."

Allyson Johnson of The Young Folks gave the episode a 9 out of 10 rating and wrote "This was an immensely strong episode of Shameless and if the season continues in this manner we'll have yet another example of how this show shifts from good to great so effortlessly. For them it just takes time to get things moving."

David Crow of Den of Geek gave the episode a 4.5 star rating out of 5 and wrote, "Indeed, much of this hour — save for one central plot that I am going to choose to take as hopeful — seems to be about picking a perspective or opinion about the various Gallagher family members and friends as we go into the second half of season five. And with John Wells taking on scripting duties, it seems like the breezy fun of Shameless season five is entering its inevitable brisk autumn." Whitney Evans of TV Fanatic gave the episode a 4.8 star rating out of 5, and wrote, "This may be the week Shameless officially broke me. It's hard to put in to words all the emotions that go through you when you watch an episode like this one."

=== Accolades ===
TVLine named Noel Fisher as an honorable mention for the "Performer of the Week" for the week of February 21, 2015, for his performance in the episode. The site wrote, "Over the course of five seasons, Noel Fisher has become Shameless' surprise MVP, and this past Sunday's episode displayed yet again how the actor has transformed Mickey from closeted thug to Ian's loving partner. Reuniting with his boyfriend in a sweet embrace after Ian's bipolar breakdown, Fisher displayed a tenderness and a depth of emotion that took our breath away. Mickey still bends the rules to make a buck, but thanks to Fisher's revelatory performance, there's no doubt that, unlike his criminal activities, his love for Ian is always pure and true."
