= Milk of the Gods =

- Shameless episode
- Episode no.: Season 5 Episode 1
- Directed by: Christopher Chulack
- Written by: Nancy M. Pimental
- Cinematography by: Kevin McKnight
- Editing by: Tim Tommasino
- Original release date: January 11, 2015
- Running time: 55 minutes

Guest appearances
- Joan Cusack as Sheila Jackson; Dermot Mulroney as Sean Pierce; Steve Kazee as Gus Pfender; Alessandra Balazs as Jackie Scabello; Nichole Sakura as Amanda; Vanessa Bell Calloway as Carol Fisher; Isidora Goreshter as Svetlana; Dichen Lachman as Angela; Axle Whitehead as Davis; Adam Cagley as Ron Kuzner; Michael Patrick McGill as Tommy; Rebecca Metz as Melinda; Kellen Michael as Chuckie Slott; Mallory Moye as RJ; David Storrs as Rinaldo

Episode chronology
| ← Previous "Lazarus" | Next → "I'm the Liver" |
- Shameless season 5

"Milk of the Gods" is the first episode of the fifth season of the American television comedy drama Shameless, an adaptation of the British series of the same name. It is the 49th overall episode of the series and was written by executive producer Nancy M. Pimental and directed by executive producer Christopher Chulack. It originally aired on Showtime on January 11, 2015.

The series is set on the South Side of Chicago, Illinois, and depicts the poor, dysfunctional family of Frank Gallagher, a neglectful single father of six: Fiona, Phillip, Ian, Debbie, Carl, and Liam. He spends his days drunk, high, or in search of money, while his children need to learn to take care of themselves. In the episode, Frank tries a new project, while Sheila clashes with Sammi.

According to Nielsen Media Research, the episode was seen by an estimated 1.77 million household viewers and gained a 0.8 ratings share among adults aged 18–49. The episode received positive reviews from critics, who praised its performances, but noting it as a slow paced premiere. For the episode, Joan Cusack won Outstanding Guest Actress in a Comedy Series at the 67th Primetime Emmy Awards.

== Plot ==
Frank (William H. Macy), still recovering from his liver transplant, is living with Sheila (Joan Cusack). Sammi (Emily Bergl) has moved in next to Sheila's house, and she has been picking up on some men at local bars. While Sheila is annoyed over her behavior, Frank constantly ignores Sammi.

Lip (Jeremy Allen White) has finished his first year at college and returns home, where he is surprised by the gentrification. Fiona (Emmy Rossum) works at the Patsy's Pie diner, and she has a friendly relationship with her new boss, Sean (Dermot Mulroney). A woman, Angela (Dichen Lachman), has been leaving large sums of tips to Fiona without explanation. Ian (Cameron Monaghan) has been allowed to stay with Mickey (Noel Fisher) at his house by helping Svetlana (Isidora Goreshter) with their baby, Yevgeny. While Mickey runs a truck scam with his brothers, Ian has been having random sexual encounters with some strangers.

Kevin (Steve Howey) and Veronica (Shanola Hampton) navigate their new life as parents. Frustrated by Kevin's obsession with the babies, she decides to cover for him at the Alibi Room while he takes care of them. When she returns, she finds him sleeping with the babies. The conflict between Sheila and Sammi escalates, to the point that Sheila decides to change the locks on the house. During this, Frank shows a partner his "job": he has been working on a new beer named Frank's Milk of the Gods. When they try it later on, they are both disgusted by its flavor. The following morning, Frank wakes up naked on a bench, and an art class has used him as reference for painting.

== Production ==
The episode was written by executive producer Nancy M. Pimental and directed by executive producer Christopher Chulack. It was Pimental's 12th writing credit, and Chulack's second directing credit.

== Reception ==
=== Viewers ===
In its original American broadcast, "Milk of the Gods" was seen by an estimated 1.77 million household viewers with a 0.8 in the 18–49 demographics. This means that 0.8 percent of all households with televisions watched the episode. This was a 9% decrease in viewership from the previous episode, which was seen by an estimated 1.93 million household viewers with a 0.9 in the 18–49 demographics.

=== Critical reviews ===
"Milk of the Gods" received positive reviews from critics. Joshua Alston of The A.V. Club gave the episode a "B–" grade and wrote, "As is the case with most Shameless premieres, "Milk Of The Gods" allows the Gallaghers to sort through last season's rubble and does a bit of table setting for what's to come, but it doesn't exactly demand attention, nor does it inspire confidence season five will continue the show's upward trajectory."

Alan Sepinwall of HitFix wrote "I've often viewed Frank as the cost of doing business with Shameless but I think this mostly sober but still despicable Frank suits Macy more than previous iterations of the character. He's still scruffy and selfish and gross, yet he seems more believable as someone the neighborhood in general and poor deluded Sheila in particular would tolerate. And it just seems a better fit of actor and character than previously." Allyson Johnson of The Young Folks wrote "this was yet another strong season introduction with the show taking on a lighter, more comedic tone than its predecessor, which fits with the summer mood."

David Crow of Den of Geek gave the episode a 4 star rating out of 5 and wrote, "Summer lasts for only so long, especially in Chicago. But before the leaves fall, it's nice to just be chilling with the Gallaghers in the backyard and happy for a moment. Or passed out by the lake again, as is Frank's preference. May he never change." Whitney Evans of TV Fanatic gave the episode a 4.2 star rating out of 5, and wrote, "It feels so good to be back in the Shameless atmosphere and I thought this was a decent season premiere."

=== Accolades ===
For the episode, Joan Cusack received her fifth nomination for Outstanding Guest Actress in a Comedy Series at the 67th Primetime Emmy Awards. She would win the award, marking the first Emmy win for the series.
