= Shameless season 5 =

Shameless
- Season 5
- DVD cover
- Showrunner: John Wells
- Starring: William H. Macy; Emmy Rossum; Jeremy Allen White; Ethan Cutkosky; Shanola Hampton; Steve Howey; Emma Kenney; Cameron Monaghan; Joan Cusack; Noel Fisher; Emily Bergl
- No. of episodes: 12

Release
- Original network: Showtime
- Original release: January 11 – April 5, 2015

Season chronology
- ← Previous; Season 4 Next → Season 6

The fifth season of Shameless, an American comedy-drama television series based on the British series of the same name by Paul Abbott, premiered on January 11, 2015 on the Showtime television network. Executive producers are John Wells, Paul Abbott and Andrew Stearn, and producer Michael Hissrich. Like all previous seasons, the season consisted of 12 episodes.

== Plot ==
The season picks up two to three months after the events of the previous season. Fiona, officially off house arrest, is still a waitress at the Golden House diner, which has been renamed to Patsy's Pies and is now under the new ownership of Sean Pierce (Dermot Mulroney); Sheila leaves town after her house burns down; Frank, Sammi and Chuckie move into the Gallagher household; Mandy moves to Indiana with Kenyatta; and Ian remains in denial of his bipolarity as Mickey continues to look after him. When Ian begins showing increasingly erratic behavior, Mickey gets Ian to admit himself into a psychological evaluation ward.

Fiona begins a relationship with local musician Gus Pfender (Steve Kazee). After a one-week relationship, Fiona and Gus impulsively decide to get married. Her problems are compounded when Jimmy—going under the alias of Jack—suddenly returns to Chicago; Jimmy reveals that after boarding Nando's yacht, he had been forced to do slave labor in South America. Fiona has sex with Jimmy, who pleads with her to accompany him on a trip to Dubai, which she refuses. Jimmy later returns, stating that he cancelled the trip to stay with her; Fiona, recognizing the problems of their relationship, ends things with him for good. Fiona later learns from Jimmy's colleague Angela (Dichen Lachman), that the client had cancelled the Dubai trip—not Jimmy. Fiona and Gus' relationship strains following Fiona's infidelity, and Fiona ends up developing feelings for Sean, who is a recovering heroin addict.

Meanwhile, Debbie begins dating Derek, a boy she bonds with during boxing lessons. Debbie goes on birth control and has sex with Derek, despite being advised against doing so within 48 hours; this ultimately results in Debbie becoming pregnant, to Fiona's dismay. Lip and Amanda continue a non-exclusive relationship, though Amanda eventually begins showing feelings for Lip, which he ignores. When Lip pursues his older professor, Helene (Sasha Alexander), Amanda angrily lashes out at him for ditching her. Kevin and Veronica struggle with parental life, and the two go through a brief break-up period, in which Svetlana strikes an unlikely bond with Kevin. Kevin and Veronica eventually make amends at the end of the season.

At the Gallagher home, Sammi takes charge as the family's caretaker. She begins openly showing a disdain for Frank, her eyes opened to her father by her half-siblings. Frank wants to get rid of Sammi and convinces Carl, who has begun dealing drugs, to use Chuckie as a drug mule. In the second half of the season, Frank bonds with his doctor Bianca (Bojana Novakovic), who is diagnosed with pancreatic cancer. Bianca refuses to endure chemo, instead wanting to experience a debauched lifestyle that Frank introduces her to. They eventually begin a romantic relationship. As Bianca's health begins deteriorating, she and Frank take a trip to Costa Rica. While Frank is sleeping, Bianca leaves a thankful goodbye note for him before walking into the ocean to presumably drown herself.

Under Frank's advice, Carl gets an unaware Chuckie to transfer heroin, but Chuckie is quickly caught by the police. Enraged by Chuckie's arrest, Sammi turns on the Gallagher clan and calls the cops on Carl. In court, Chuckie is sentenced to ninety days in juvenile prison while Carl, refusing to give up his drug dealers, is sentenced to one year. In another attempt to get retribution on the Gallaghers, Sammi reports Ian to the military police for his military insubordination. Ian is subsequently arrested. Angered by Sammi's actions, Mickey vengefully drugs Sammi with roofies until she passes out unconscious. When Mickey wrongly assumes the roofies have killed Sammi, he and Debbie hide Sammi's body in a moving storage container. Meanwhile, Ian receives a visit from Monica, and the two briefly hitchhike out of the state after he is released.

Ian returns to the South Side and reunites with Mickey. However, Ian breaks up with him, affirming that he doesn't want to put Mickey through his bipolarity. The fifth season closes on a cliffhanger, with Sammi suddenly showing up and attempting to shoot Mickey with a gun. The shootout ultimately results in both Mickey and Sammi's incarceration.

== Cast and characters ==
=== Main ===
- William H. Macy as Frank Gallagher
- Emmy Rossum as Fiona Gallagher
- Jeremy Allen White as Philip "Lip" Gallagher
- Ethan Cutkosky as Carl Gallagher
- Shanola Hampton as Veronica "V" Fisher
- Steve Howey as Kevin "Kev" Ball
- Emma Kenney as Debbie Gallagher
- Cameron Monaghan as Ian Gallagher
- Noel Fisher as Mickey Milkovich
- Emily Bergl as Samantha "Sammi" Slott

=== Special guest stars ===
- Joan Cusack as Sheila Jackson
- Justin Chatwin as Steve Wilton / James "Jimmy" Lishman

=== Special guest ===
- Dermot Mulroney as Sean Pierce
- Steve Kazee as Gus Pfender
- Sasha Alexander as Helene Runyon Robinson

=== Recurring ===
- Michael Patrick McGill as Tommy
- Jim Hoffmaster as Kermit
- Vanessa Bell Calloway as Carol Fisher
- Danika Yarosh as Holly Herkimer
- J. Michael Trautmann as Iggy Milkovich
- Isidora Goreshter as Svetlana Yevgenivna
- Nichole Bloom as Amanda
- Kellen Michael as Chuckie Slott
- Alessandra Balazs as Jackie Scabello
- Dichen Lachman as Angela
- Axle Whitehead as Davis
- Rebecca Metz as Melinda
- Jackson A. Dunn as Will Pierce
- Christopher Stills as Chris
- Luca Oriel as Derek Delgado
- Michael B. Silver as Lorenzo
- Bojana Novakovic as Bianca Samson
- Michael Reilly Burke as Theo Wallace Robinson

=== Guests ===
- Emma Greenwell as Mandy Milkovich
- Chloe Webb as Monica Gallagher
- Shel Bailey as Kenyatta
- Adam Cagley as Ron Kuzner
- James Allen McCune as Matty Baker
- Teresa Ornelas as Ellie
- Miguel Izaguirre as Paco
- Jenica Bergere as Lisa
- Lily Holleman as Lisa
- Alex Borstein as Lou Deckner
- Ian Kahn as Jason
- Suzanne Cryer as Cheryl
- Patrick Fischler as Wade Shelton
- Stacy Edwards as Laura Shelton
- Stephen Rider as G-Dogg
- JB Blanc as Hanzi
- Gabrielle Walsh as Tanya Delgado
- Sam Lloyd as Buddy Diamond
- José Julián as Joaquin

== Episodes ==
| No. overall | No. in season | Title | Directed by | Written by | Original release date | US viewers (millions) |
|---|---|---|---|---|---|---|
| 49 | 1 | "Milk of the Gods" | Christopher Chulack | Nancy M. Pimental | January 11, 2015 | 1.77 |
Lip returns home from his first year of college to find the neighborhood moving swiftly toward gentrification. Frank, still recovering from his liver transplant, is living with Sheila and ignoring Sammi, who has begun acting out in order to get her father's attention. Sammi and Sheila continue to clash, and Sheila changes the locks on her house to prevent Sammi from entering. Fiona is engrossed in her job at the Patsy's Pies diner, and she has a friendly relationship with her new boss, Sean. Fiona flirts with local band player Davis, while a woman, Angela, has been leaving large sums of tips to Fiona without explanation. At the Milkovich house, Ian helps a pregnant Svetlana take care of baby Yevgeny, while Mickey and his brothers run a moving truck scam. Ian, hypersexual as a result of his condition, pursues multiple anonymous sexual encounters. Veronica struggles with parental life and is frustrated by Kevin's obsession with their babies. It is revealed that Frank is trying to produce his own beer, called Frank's Milk of the Gods.
| 50 | 2 | "I'm the Liver" | Sanaa Hamri | Krista Vernoff | January 18, 2015 | 1.76 |
Officially off house arrest, Fiona cuts off her ankle bracelet. Lip starts a new job working construction in the neighborhood, but struggles with the job's intense labor. Sheila considers a lucrative offer from lesbian land developers who want to buy her home. Frank tries to talk her out of it and begins warning everyone of the neighborhood's impending development. The father of the boy whose liver Frank received invites Frank and Sheila to a special father's day dinner with all the other organ recipients; Sammi ends up crashing the dinner, further enraging Sheila. Ian, Mickey and Mandy plan revenge against a homophobic military funeral protest by having Mandy seduce the priest into giving him oral sex, only for it to instead be performed by a man. Kevin bonds with Svetlana, who cuts Kevin's long hair to prevent the babies from pulling on it, angering Veronica; Svetlana also gives Debbie a makeover to help attract boys. Fiona develops feelings for Sean and confronts him; Sean reveals he also has feelings but cannot date her, believing Fiona to be a "chaos junkie."
| 51 | 3 | "The Two Lisas" | Peter Segal | Sheila Callaghan | January 25, 2015 | 1.96 |
Ian and Mickey discover that Mandy plans to move to Indiana with her abusive boyfriend, Kenyatta, prompting Ian to ask Lip to help convince Mandy not to move. Lip and Mandy have sex, but Lip remains emotionally unavailable when Mandy confesses her love for him; Mandy leaves with Kenyatta the next day. Fiona agrees to go to a concert with Davis, but when his girlfriend shows up, Fiona makes a play for his bass player Gus. Debbie throws a party at the Gallagher house and invites Matt. Debbie has sex with Matt while he is sleeping, unaware that her actions constitute as rape. Matt confronts Debbie for initiating the sexual encounter and cuts ties with her. In exchange for new brewery equipment, Frank sets the owner of a junkyard up with Sammi under the pretense that she will sleep with him. An outraged Sammi initiates a fight with Frank and Sheila outside the house; Frank's beer still suddenly ignites and blows up Sheila's house. Sheila jumps in her newly purchased RV and flees town, finally fulfilling her dream of travelling the world.
| 52 | 4 | "A Night to Remem... Wait, What?" | Richie Keen | Davey Holmes | February 1, 2015 | 1.26 |
A hungover Frank arrives at Lou's to pick up his six figure insurance settlement, but he is confounded when told he arrived the previous day. Realizing he has no recollection of the previous day, Frank tries to retrace his steps. Frank ultimately discovers that he had spent the majority of the settlement on drugs and buying a Porsche, and had donated the remainder of the money to fund extensive prosthetic equipment for children. Lip visits Amanda and her family at their home in Miami; Amanda's father expresses interest in giving Lip a paid internship. Carl starts a new job as a drug dealer, and his leg injury helps him earn money. Debbie attends boxing lessons and meets another boy, Derek. Ian goes overboard when he starts stealing suitcases from the airport baggage claim. Veronica feels guilty when she experiences an orgasm while grinding with another man at a dance club, and she realizes how much she misses Kevin's attention. Fiona and Gus continue to hit it off, and after nine days of dating, Gus suggests that they get married. Although surprised by the suggestion, Fiona accepts the offer and they get a civil wedding on a whim.
| 53 | 5 | "Rite of Passage" | Alex Graves | Etan Frankel | February 8, 2015 | 1.64 |
Homeless and penniless once again, Frank tries to move in with his liver donor's parents, but ends up having sex with the mother of his liver recipient. After her trailer is impounded, Sammi believes that Frank will buy her a new trailer. When Sammi discovers that Frank is bluffing, she chases Frank and tries to stab him. Debbie uses her new boxing skills to beat up Holly and Ellie. Carl continues to flounder at his drug dealing business. Fiona wrestles over her hasty decision to marry Gus, and her concerns are further compounded when a colleague overdoses on heroin. Fiona reveals her marriage to Lip. Following the incident at the dance club, Veronica proposes that Kevin should cheat on her to make it even. Kevin gets oral sex from a woman but feels guilty; Veronica, despite consenting to the encounter, is not satisfied either. Mickey is furious when Ian's reckless behavior leads him to partake in a pornographic film, and he demands that Ian enter a mental rehabilitation facility. Upon hearing this, Ian flees Mickey's house, taking Yevgeny with him. At Patsy's, Fiona finds Angela sitting with Jimmy at one of her tables.
| 54 | 6 | "Crazy Love" | Anthony Hemingway | John Wells | February 15, 2015 | 1.26 |
Fiona angrily punches Jimmy, who reveals that he was forced into slave labor in South America, but ultimately escaped. Jimmy tells Fiona that he is still in love with her, and Fiona reveals her marriage. Nevertheless, the two end up having sex at the Gallagher house, putting Fiona into an emotional crisis over Gus and Jimmy. In Fiona's absence, Sammi takes charge in the Gallagher household by implementing curfews and preparing the kids for school. Frank's condition worsens due to heavy drug use and he is hospitalized for mistreating his liver. Lip returns to college to work as a resident assistant. Kevin and Veronica decide to split up. Ian is on the run with Mickey and Svetlana's baby, but he quickly spirals out of control and lands in the hands of the police after leaving Yevgeny in the car. At the police station, Mickey convinces Ian to admit himself at the psychological evaluation ward.
| 55 | 7 | "Tell Me You Fucking Need Me" | William H. Macy | Nancy M. Pimental | March 1, 2015 | 1.44 |
Jimmy prepares to depart for Dubai and he presses Fiona to make a decision. At the psych ward, Ian shuns Fiona and Mickey when they visit, and Mickey begins to turn to alcohol to dull his longing for Ian. Lip is met with financial aid difficulties after discovering that he did not fill out his financial aid papers. Sammi enlists Carl to protect Chuckie from bullies at school, but instead Carl gets detention for bullying and pushing Chuckie. Frank returns from the hospital and asserts himself at the Gallagher home, to Sammi's dismay. Reaching a boiling point, Sammi shoots Frank in the arm in order to get him to admit that he loves her. Debbie and Derek begin dating. Veronica moves into the Alibi, while Svetlana moves in with a newly separated Kevin to help babysit his children. Fiona discloses her infidelity to Gus, who punches Jimmy upon meeting him at Patsy's. Jimmy tells Fiona that he has called off the trip to Dubai, and that he only wants a life with her, but after deliberation, Fiona tells Jimmy that he needs to let her let him go. Fiona later runs into Angela, who reveals that Jimmy only stayed because his boss cancelled the trip to Dubai.
| 56 | 8 | "Uncle Carl" | Wendey Stanzler | Krista Vernoff | March 8, 2015 | 1.60 |
Ian is released from the ward after being diagnosed with a severe bipolar disorder, and he flushes his lithium pills down the toilet at the Gallagher house. While finding new prescriptions for Ian, Debbie confronts Mickey about his alcoholic denial, and Mickey finally reconciles with Ian. Short on funds, Lip convinces Kevin to revisit their marijuana-selling days, and he is able to bide time concerning his financial woes by giving a heartfelt plea to school officials. Kevin has sex with a sorority girl from Lip's college, while Veronica and Svetlana bond after Svetlana gives her oral sex to relieve her stress. Fiona tries to reconcile with Gus, but he is unwilling to commit or forgive, instead leaving on an extended tour with his band. Frank humors Sammi while scheming for a way to get rid of her. When Carl is tasked by his boss to transport heroin to Michigan, Frank seizes the opportunity by convincing Carl to use Chuckie as a mule, after which Frank secretly calls the cops on Chuckie. The plan is successful, and Chuckie is arrested. Soon after, an enraged Sammi calls the cops and Carl is also arrested.
| 57 | 9 | "Carl's First Sentencing" | Christopher Chulack | Etan Frankel | March 15, 2015 | 1.62 |
Sammi butt heads with her siblings as Fiona tries to help Carl with his sentencing. Lip begins a sexual relationship with his professor Helene, and discovers that she is in an open relationship with her husband. Lip is contacted by a school official, who reveals that an old friend will cover Lip's tuition until he can pay it himself. Kevin finds a new calling at Lip's school in helping female students reach their dorm rooms safely. Mickey convinces Ian to get back on his meds, and Fiona secures Ian a dishwashing job at Patsy's. Fiona consoles Sean when he receives news that his ex-wife is moving out of town with their son Will. While undergoing treatment at the hospital, Frank discovers that his doctor Bianca has been diagnosed with terminal cancer. Frank tries to lift Bianca's spirits, and the two bond over a grand adventure that spans 48 hours. Carl purposely botches his sentencing hearing, and he is sent to a juvenile correctional facility with Chuckie. To ensure that Chuckie will be protected in prison, Sammi imprints a swastika on Chuckie's forehead, after which Chuckie is quickly taken in by a neo-Nazi gang.
| 58 | 10 | "South Side Rules" | Michael Uppendahl | Sheila Callaghan | March 22, 2015 | 1.67 |
Debbie and Derek agree to consummate their relationship, and Fiona helps Debbie get birth control pills; Debbie is informed that the birth control pills will not take effect until after 48 hours. That night, Debbie and Derek have sex, but Debbie advises him not to use a condom. Frank continues to bond with Bianca, who reveals that she has decided against chemotherapy. Lip and Amanda's relationship becomes strained when Lip reveals that he had sex with Helene. Kevin unwittingly sells synthetic marijuana to a handful of college students, which leads to one student jumping out a second story window. Lip turns to Helene for assistance, and she tells Lip that he needs to act up. Lip ultimately kicks Kevin out of the dorm, and he returns to Veronica. Fiona meets with Sean as he bids farewell to his family, and they go to a bar; the two later kiss. Ian and Mickey fight over their differences before making love at an old rendezvous. The two return home to have their first official date as a couple, only to discover that Sammi, intending to exact revenge against the Gallaghers, has called the cops on Ian for his military insubordination.
| 59 | 11 | "Drugs Actually" | Mimi Leder | Davey Holmes | March 29, 2015 | 1.43 |
Ian is arrested for going AWOL, destroying federal property, and falsifying Lip's ID to enroll. Mickey and Debbie hatch a revenge plan against Sammi by drugging her with rohypnol, but they are shocked when it appears that Sammi has died from the drugs. They decide to hide Sammi's body in a moving truck; it is later revealed that Sammi is actually alive. Fiona continues to get closer to Sean, and discovers that Gus is returning to Chicago. Lip enjoys the benefits of his relationship with Helene, who invites him to an exclusive party. Kevin and Veronica attempt to mend their relationship while fixing a broken pipe at the Alibi. Bianca decides to live out her final days in Costa Rica when Frank calls her family to help her accept chemotherapy. Frank reveals that he was afraid of never seeing her again, and she allows him to accompany her in Costa Rica. After a disclosure of Ian's condition, the Gallaghers convince the army officials to release Ian. Ian receives a visit from Monica, who proclaims that no one will ever understand him but her. After Ian is released into Monica's custody, the two hitchhike out of the state.
| 60 | 12 | "Love Songs (In the Key of Gallagher)" | Christopher Chulack | John Wells | April 5, 2015 | 1.55 |
Bianca and Frank live the high life in Costa Rica as Bianca's health worsens; Bianca weakly thanks Frank for keeping her happy in her final days. The following morning, Bianca leaves a note for Frank and supposedly drowns herself in the ocean. Angry that Lip continues to ignore her for Helene, Amanda punches Lip and breaks up with him. Kevin and Veronica reconcile their relationship. Fiona scolds Debbie after walking in on her and Derek having sex, and Debbie reveals that she is pregnant. Fiona advises Debbie to get an abortion, but Debbie insists on keeping the baby. Fiona and Gus reconnect, but neither of them seem interested in continuing their marriage. Fiona confronts Sean and declares her feelings for him, but Sean coldly tells her to grow up. Monica and Ian's road trip ends up at her meth-dealing teenage boyfriend's property; Monica's boyfriend takes a dislike to Ian. Ian decides to leave and returns home to break up with Mickey, stating that he doesn't want to put Mickey through his bipolarity, and feeling that Mickey will not truly love him for what he is now. Sammi returns and attempts to shoot Mickey, but fails.

== Development and production ==
On February 18, 2014, Showtime announced the series would be renewed for a fifth season. Production on the first episode began on July 3, 2014 with the first table read, with principal photography commencing on July 8, 2014.

== Reception ==
Review aggregator Rotten Tomatoes gives the fifth season a 92%, based on 12 reviews. The critics consensus reads, "Settling into its fifth year with a irascible sense of fun, Shameless hints that the Gallaghers won't become a functional family unit anytime soon - but audiences will adore them all the same."
