= Uncle Carl =

- Shameless episode
- Episode no.: Season 5 Episode 8
- Directed by: Wendey Stanzler
- Written by: Krista Vernoff
- Cinematography by: Kevin McKnight
- Editing by: Tim Tommasino
- Original release date: March 8, 2015
- Running time: 52 minutes

Guest appearances
- Dermot Mulroney as Sean Pierce (special guest star); Steve Kazee as Gus Pfender (special guest star); Jenica Bergere as Lisa #1; Nichole Sakura as Amanda; Isidora Goreshter as Svetlana; Bojana Novakovic as Bianca Samson; Michael B. Silver as Lorenzo; Luca Oriel as Derek Delgado; Axle Whitehead as Davis; Susan Chuang as Kathy Beard; Demetrius Grosse as Eddie Murphy; Jim Hoffmaster as Kermit; Michael Patrick McGill as Tommy; Kellen Michael as Chuckie Slott; Stephen Rider as G-Dog; J. Michael Trautmann as Iggy Milkovich

Episode chronology
← Previous "Tell Me You Fucking Need Me"	Next → "Carl's First Sentencing"
- Shameless season 5

"Uncle Carl" is the eighth episode of the fifth season of the American television comedy drama Shameless, an adaptation of the British series of the same name. It is the 56th overall episode of the series and was written by co-executive producer Krista Vernoff and directed by Wendey Stanzler. It originally aired on Showtime on March 8, 2015.

The series is set on the South Side of Chicago, Illinois, and depicts the poor, dysfunctional family of Frank Gallagher, a neglectful single father of six: Fiona, Phillip, Ian, Debbie, Carl, and Liam. He spends his days drunk, high, or in search of money, while his children need to learn to take care of themselves. In the episode, Frank enlists Carl to get rid of Sammi, while Ian returns home from the psych ward.

According to Nielsen Media Research, the episode was seen by an estimated 1.60 million household viewers and gained a 0.7 ratings share among adults aged 18–49. The episode received critical acclaim, who praised the storylines, performances and cliffhanger ending.

== Plot ==
Fiona (Emmy Rossum) and Lip (Jeremy Allen White) pick up Ian (Cameron Monaghan) from the ward, after his doctor diagnoses him with a severe bipolar disorder. Frank (William H. Macy) is still forced to hang out with Sammi (Emily Bergl), who also prevents him from revealing she caused the gunshot.

Carl (Ethan Cutkosky) is tasked by his drug boss, G-Dog (Stephen Rider), in smuggling heroin to Flint, Michigan. Seizing the opportunity, Frank convinces Carl in taking Chuckie (Kellen Michael) with him, so he can use him as a scapegoat if anything goes awry. At the station, police officers arrive at the scene, prompting Carl to abandon Chuckie. The officers' dogs discover the heroin on Chuckie, and he is subsequently arrested. Lip is still trying to find ways to cover his financial debt at tuition, and asks Kevin (Steve Howey). They then decide to revisit their marijuana-selling days, and Lip uses his status as resident assistant to gain customers. During a meeting with a tutor, Lip explains his problems at home, and his tutor offers to try a new alternative.

While Debbie (Emma Kenney) is asked to watch over Ian, she misses him descending from his room. In the kitchen, he notices the three bottles of lithium and flushes them down the toilet. This horrifies Debbie, who tries desperately to find new prescriptions. She asks Mickey (Noel Fisher) for help, but Mickey has fallen into alcoholism after Ian's medical condition, and Debbie calls him out for not helping Ian in his recovery. While separated from Kevin, Veronica (Shanola Hampton) hangs out with Svetlana (Isidora Goreshter), and they bond after she gives her oral sex to relieve her stress.

Fiona meets with Gus (Steve Kazee), hoping to reconcile their marriage by accompanying him into his tour. However, Gus makes it clear he is still distracted by Fiona having sex with Jimmy, and wants to go on tour to re-consider their marriage. Kevin is later seen sleeping in the college dorm room, after having sex with one of Lip's classmates. Sammi is upset upon learning of Chuckie's arrest, unaware that Frank called the cops to warn them. That night, Sammi calls cops to arrest Carl, claiming he was the actual mule. Carl flees from the house but is arrested a couple of streets away. As the family awaits for a response, Mickey finally reconciles with Ian.

== Production ==
The episode was written by co-executive producer Krista Vernoff and directed by Wendey Stanzler. It was Vernoff's fourth writing credit, and Stanzler's first directing credit.

== Reception ==
=== Viewers ===
In its original American broadcast, "Uncle Carl" was seen by an estimated 1.60 million household viewers with a 0.7 in the 18–49 demographics. This means that 0.7 percent of all households with televisions watched the episode. This was a 11 percent increase in viewership from the previous episode, which was seen by an estimated 1.44 million household viewers with a 0.6 in the 18–49 demographics.

=== Critical reviews ===
"Uncle Carl" received critical acclaim. Joshua Alston of The A.V. Club gave the episode an "A–" grade and wrote, ""Uncle Carl" is the Shameless episode I've been waiting for all season, the one in which the many narrow tributaries start combining and every plot development begins to feel consequential. The building of momentum is a slow-going process for Shameless every season, and quite often even the goofiest storylines are part of a larger plan that doesn't make any sense until it does. [...] It has taken even longer for the writers to get their dominoes lined up in season five, but "Uncle Carl" feels like the first one tipping over, which is a good place to be heading into the season's final third."

Marc Snetiker of Entertainment Weekly wrote "The lesbians who want to renovate the vacant lot with a community garden are beginning to show the cracks brought on them by the Gallaghers. How long until they'll do something drastic that will send the Gallaghers (and, by extent, the Milkoviches and every other crazy person in their giant web) into battle mode?"

Allyson Johnson of The Young Folks gave the episode a 9 out of 10 rating and wrote "A fantastic episode to bring us in for the ending run of the season." Virginia Podesta of TV Overmind wrote "Once again, this force of nature of a series demonstrates that Shameless has an identity and that it is able to leave an imprint by taking chances."

David Crow of Den of Geek gave the episode a 4 star rating out of 5 and wrote, "As for now, it was a solid hour where Carl's obliviousness put it over the top for me, which is rare. Here's hoping that he took his siblings' advice about saying nothing. Then again, he could just tell the fuzz the truth about his situation: "Gallaghers."" Whitney Evans of TV Fanatic gave the episode a 4.5 star rating out of 5, and wrote, "When Ian came home, he still wasn't accepting his diagnosis and he was very resistant to his medication, which as everyone pointed out to him, was a very Monica approach."
