= Primetime Emmy Award for Outstanding Lead Actor in a Comedy Series =

Award for lead actor in a television comedy series

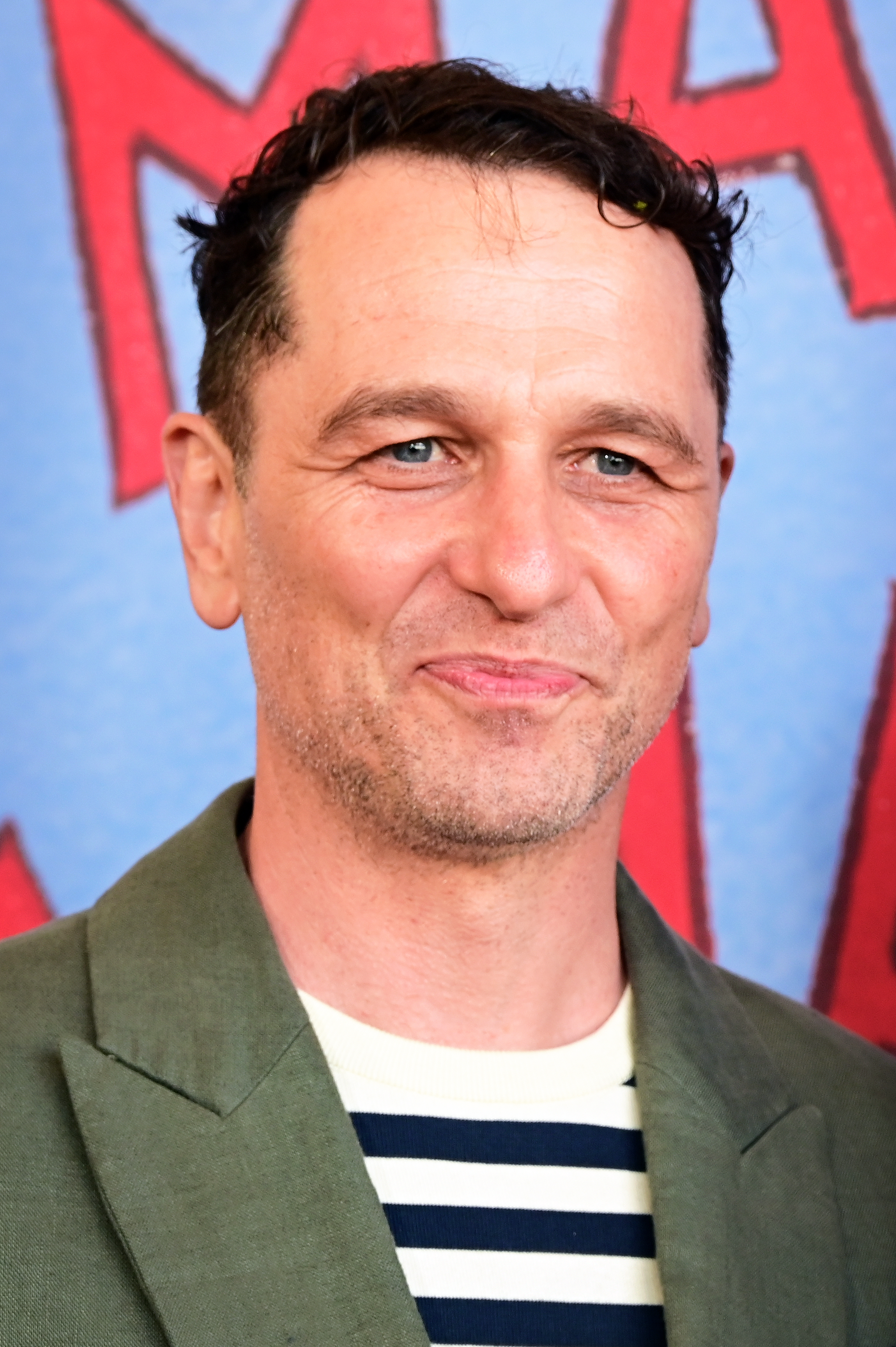
- 2026 recipient Matthew Rhys
- Awarded for: Outstanding Lead Actor in a Comedy Series
- Country: United States
- Presented by: Academy of Television Arts & Sciences
- First award: 1954
- Currently held by: Matthew Rhys, Widow's Bay (2026)
- Website: emmys.com

This is a list of winners and nominees of the Primetime Emmy Award for Outstanding Lead Actor in a Comedy Series. The award is presented to the best performance by a lead actor in a television comedy series. Beginning with 1966, leading actors in comedy have competed alone. However, these comedic performances included actors from miniseries, telefilms, and guest performers competing against main cast competitors. Such instances are marked below:

- # – Indicates a performance in a miniseries or television film, prior to the category's creation
- § – Indicates a performance as a guest performer, prior to the category's creation

== Winners and nominations ==
=== 1950s ===
Year	Actor	Role	Program	Network
Best Male Star of a Regular Series
1954 (6th) (Note: Early Emmy ceremonies did not have genre specific acting categories.)
1954 (6th)	Donald O'Connor	Himself	The Colgate Comedy Hour	NBC
1954 (6th)	Sid Caesar	Various characters	Your Show of Shows	NBC
1954 (6th)	Wally Cox	Robinson Peepers	Mister Peepers	NBC
1954 (6th)	Jackie Gleason	Various characters	The Jackie Gleason Show	CBS
1954 (6th)	Jack Webb	Joe Friday	Dragnet	NBC
Best Actor Starring in a Regular Series
1955 (7th)
1955 (7th)	Danny Thomas	Danny Williams	Make Room for Daddy	ABC
1955 (7th)	Richard Boone	Dr. Konrad Styner	Medic	NBC
1955 (7th)	Robert Cummings	Robert Beanblossom	My Hero	NBC
1955 (7th)	Jackie Gleason	Various characters	The Jackie Gleason Show	CBS
1955 (7th)	Jack Webb	Joe Friday	Dragnet	NBC
Best Actor - Continuing Performance
1956 (8th)
1956 (8th)	Phil Silvers	MSgt. Ernest G. Bilko	The Phil Silvers Show	CBS
1956 (8th)	Robert Cummings	Bob Collins	The Bob Cummings Show	CBS
1956 (8th)	Jackie Gleason	Ralph Kramden	The Honeymooners	CBS
1956 (8th)	Danny Thomas	Danny Williams	Make Room for Daddy	ABC
1956 (8th)	Robert Young	Jim Anderson	Father Knows Best	CBS
Best Continuing Performance by a Comedian in a Series
1957 (9th)
1957 (9th)	Sid Caesar	Various characters	Caesar's Hour	NBC
1957 (9th)	Jack Benny	Various characters	The Jack Benny Program	CBS
1957 (9th)	Robert Cummings	Bob Collins	The Bob Cummings Show	CBS
1957 (9th)	Ernie Kovacs	Himself	The Ernie Kovacs Show	NBC
1957 (9th)	Phil Silvers	MSgt. Ernest G. Bilko	The Phil Silvers Show	CBS
Best Continuing Performance by an Actor in a Leading Role in a Dramatic or Comedy Series
1958 (10th)
1958 (10th)	Robert Young	Jim Anderson	Father Knows Best	NBC
1958 (10th)	James Arness	Matt Dillon	Gunsmoke	CBS
1958 (10th)	Robert Cummings	Bob Collins	The Bob Cummings Show	CBS
1958 (10th)	Phil Silvers	MSgt. Ernest G. Bilko	The Phil Silvers Show	CBS
1958 (10th)	Danny Thomas	Danny Williams	The Danny Thomas Show	ABC & CBS
Best Actor in a Leading Role (Continuing Character) in a Comedy Series
1959 (11th)
1959 (11th)	Jack Benny	Various characters	The Jack Benny Program	CBS
1959 (11th)	Walter Brennan	Grandpa Amos McCoy	The Real McCoys	ABC
1959 (11th)	Robert Cummings	Bob Collins	The Bob Cummings Show	NBC
1959 (11th)	Phil Silvers	MSgt. Ernest G. Bilko	The Phil Silvers Show	CBS
1959 (11th)	Danny Thomas	Danny Williams	The Danny Thomas Show	CBS
1959 (11th)	Robert Young	Jim Anderson	Father Knows Best	CBS & NBC

=== 1960s ===
Year	Actor	Role	Program	Network
Outstanding Performance by an Actor in a Series (Lead or Support)
1960 (12th)
1960 (12th)	Robert Stack	Eliot Ness	The Untouchables	ABC
1960 (12th)	Richard Boone	Paladin	Have Gun – Will Travel	CBS
1960 (12th)	Raymond Burr	Perry Mason	Perry Mason	CBS
Outstanding Performance by an Actor in a Series (Lead)
1961 (13th)
1961 (13th)	Raymond Burr	Perry Mason	Perry Mason	CBS
1961 (13th)	Jackie Cooper	Chick Hennesey	Hennesey	CBS
1961 (13th)	Robert Stack	Eliot Ness	The Untouchables	ABC
Outstanding Continued Performance by an Actor in a Series (Lead)
1962 (14th)
1962 (14th)	E. G. Marshall	Lawrence Preston	The Defenders	CBS
1962 (14th)	Paul Burke	Det. Adam Flint	Naked City	ABC
1962 (14th)	Jackie Cooper	Chick Hennesey	Hennesey	CBS
1962 (14th)	Vince Edwards	Ben Casey	Ben Casey	ABC
1962 (14th)	George Maharis	Buz Murdock	Route 66	CBS
1963 (15th)
1963 (15th)	E. G. Marshall	Lawrence Preston	The Defenders	CBS
1963 (15th)	Ernest Borgnine	Lt. Cmdr. Quinton McHale	McHale's Navy	ABC
1963 (15th)	Paul Burke	Det. Adam Flint	Naked City	ABC
1963 (15th)	Vic Morrow	Sgt. Sanders	Combat!	ABC
1963 (15th)	Dick Van Dyke	Rob Petrie	The Dick Van Dyke Show	CBS
1964 (16th)
1964 (16th)	Dick Van Dyke	Rob Petrie	The Dick Van Dyke Show	CBS
1964 (16th)	Richard Boone	Host	The Richard Boone Show	NBC
1964 (16th)	Dean Jagger	Principal Albert Vane	Mr. Novak	NBC
1964 (16th)	David Janssen	Dr. Richard Kimble	The Fugitive	ABC
1964 (16th)	George C. Scott	Neil Brock	East Side/West Side	CBS
Outstanding Individual Achievements in Entertainment - Actors and Performers
1965 (17th)
1965 (17th)	Leonard Bernstein	Conductor	New York Philharmonic Young People's Concerts with Leonard Bernstein	CBS
1965 (17th)	Lynn Fontanne	Fanny Bowditch Holmes	Hallmark Hall of Fame: "The Magnificent Yankee"	NBC
1965 (17th)	Alfred Lunt	Oliver Wendell Holmes Jr.	Hallmark Hall of Fame: "The Magnificent Yankee"	NBC
1965 (17th)	Barbra Streisand	Herself	My Name Is Barbra	CBS
1965 (17th)	Dick Van Dyke	Rob Petrie	The Dick Van Dyke Show	CBS
1965 (17th)	Julie Andrews	Herself	The Andy Williams Show: "November 30, 1964"	NBC
1965 (17th)	Johnny Carson	Host	The Tonight Show Starring Johnny Carson	NBC
1965 (17th)	Gladys Cooper	Margaret St. Clair	The Rogues	NBC
1965 (17th)	Robert Coote	Timmy St. Clair	The Rogues	NBC
1965 (17th)	Richard Crenna	James Slattery	Slattery's People	CBS
1965 (17th)	Julie Harris	Florence Nightingale	Hallmark Hall of Fame: "The Holy Terror"	NBC
1965 (17th)	Bob Hope	Himself	Chrysler Presents A Bob Hope Comedy Special	NBC
1965 (17th)	Dean Jagger	Principal Albert Vane	Mr. Novak	NBC
1965 (17th)	Danny Kaye	Host	The Danny Kaye Show	CBS
1965 (17th)	David McCallum	Illya Kuryakin	The Man from U.N.C.L.E.	NBC
1965 (17th)	Red Skelton	Himself	The Red Skelton Hour	CBS
Outstanding Continued Performance by an Actor in a Leading Role in a Comedy Series
1966 (18th)
1966 (18th)	Dick Van Dyke	Rob Petrie	The Dick Van Dyke Show	CBS
1966 (18th)	Don Adams	Maxwell Smart	Get Smart	NBC
1966 (18th)	Bob Crane	Colonel Robert E. Hogan	Hogan's Heroes	CBS
1967 (19th)
1967 (19th)	Don Adams	Maxwell Smart	Get Smart	NBC
1967 (19th)	Bob Crane	Colonel Robert E. Hogan	Hogan's Heroes	CBS
1967 (19th)	Brian Keith	Bill Davis	Family Affair	CBS
1967 (19th)	Larry Storch	Corporal Randolph Agarn	F Troop	ABC
1968 (20th)
1968 (20th)	Don Adams	Maxwell Smart	Get Smart	NBC
1968 (20th)	Richard Benjamin	Dick Hollister	He & She	CBS
1968 (20th)	Sebastian Cabot	Giles French	Family Affair	CBS
1968 (20th)	Brian Keith	Bill Davis	Family Affair	CBS
1968 (20th)	Dick York	Darrin Stephens	Bewitched	ABC
1969 (21st)
1969 (21st)	Don Adams	Maxwell Smart	Get Smart	NBC
1969 (21st)	Brian Keith	Bill Davis	Family Affair	CBS
1969 (21st)	Edward Mulhare	Captain Daniel Gregg	The Ghost and Mrs. Muir	NBC
1969 (21st)	Lloyd Nolan	Dr. Morton Chegley	Julia	NBC

=== 1970s ===
Year	Actor	Role	Program	Network
1970 (22nd)
1970 (22nd)	William Windom	John Monroe	My World and Welcome to It	NBC
1970 (22nd)	Bill Cosby	Chet Kincaid	The Bill Cosby Show	NBC
1970 (22nd)	Lloyd Haynes	Pete Dixon	Room 222	ABC
1971 (23rd)
1971 (23rd)	Jack Klugman	Oscar Madison	The Odd Couple	ABC
1971 (23rd)	Ted Bessell	Donald Hollinger	That Girl	ABC
1971 (23rd)	Bill Bixby	Tom Corbett	The Courtship of Eddie's Father	ABC
1971 (23rd)	Carroll O'Connor	Archie Bunker	All in the Family	CBS
1971 (23rd)	Tony Randall	Felix Unger	The Odd Couple	ABC
1972 (24th)
1972 (24th)	Carroll O'Connor	Archie Bunker	All in the Family	CBS
1972 (24th)	Redd Foxx	Fred G. Sanford	Sanford and Son	NBC
1972 (24th)	Jack Klugman	Oscar Madison	The Odd Couple	ABC
1972 (24th)	Tony Randall	Felix Unger	The Odd Couple	ABC
1973 (25th)
1973 (25th)	Jack Klugman	Oscar Madison	The Odd Couple	ABC
1973 (25th)	Alan Alda	Hawkeye Pierce	M*A*S*H	CBS
1973 (25th)	Redd Foxx	Fred G. Sanford	Sanford and Son	NBC
1973 (25th)	Carroll O'Connor	Archie Bunker	All in the Family	CBS
1973 (25th)	Tony Randall	Felix Unger	The Odd Couple	ABC
1974 (26th)
1974 (26th)	Alan Alda	Hawkeye Pierce	M*A*S*H	CBS
1974 (26th)	Redd Foxx	Fred G. Sanford	Sanford and Son	NBC
1974 (26th)	Jack Klugman	Oscar Madison	The Odd Couple	ABC
1974 (26th)	Carroll O'Connor	Archie Bunker	All in the Family	CBS
1974 (26th)	Tony Randall	Felix Unger	The Odd Couple	ABC
1975 (27th)
1975 (27th)	Tony Randall	Felix Unger	The Odd Couple	ABC
1975 (27th)	Jack Albertson	Ed Brown	Chico and the Man	NBC
1975 (27th)	Alan Alda	Hawkeye Pierce	M*A*S*H	CBS
1975 (27th)	Jack Klugman	Oscar Madison	The Odd Couple	ABC
1975 (27th)	Carroll O'Connor	Archie Bunker	All in the Family	CBS
1976 (28th)
1976 (28th)	Jack Albertson	Ed Brown	Chico and the Man	NBC
1976 (28th)	Alan Alda	Hawkeye Pierce	M*A*S*H	CBS
1976 (28th)	Hal Linden	Barney Miller	Barney Miller	ABC
1976 (28th)	Henry Winkler	Fonzie	Happy Days	ABC
1977 (29th)
1977 (29th)	Carroll O'Connor	Archie Bunker	All in the Family	CBS
1977 (29th)	Jack Albertson	Ed Brown	Chico and the Man	NBC
1977 (29th)	Alan Alda	Hawkeye Pierce	M*A*S*H	CBS
1977 (29th)	Hal Linden	Barney Miller	Barney Miller	ABC
1977 (29th)	Henry Winkler	Fonzie	Happy Days	ABC
1978 (30th)
1978 (30th)	Carroll O'Connor	Archie Bunker	All in the Family	CBS
1978 (30th)	Alan Alda	Hawkeye Pierce	M*A*S*H	CBS
1978 (30th)	Hal Linden	Barney Miller	Barney Miller	ABC
1978 (30th)	John Ritter	Jack Tripper	Three's Company	ABC
1978 (30th)	Henry Winkler	Fonzie	Happy Days	ABC
1979 (31st)
1979 (31st)	Carroll O'Connor	Archie Bunker	All in the Family	CBS
1979 (31st)	Alan Alda	Hawkeye Pierce	M*A*S*H	CBS
1979 (31st)	Judd Hirsch	Alex Reiger	Taxi	ABC
1979 (31st)	Hal Linden	Barney Miller	Barney Miller	ABC
1979 (31st)	Robin Williams	Mork	Mork & Mindy	ABC

=== 1980s ===
Year	Actor	Role	Program	Episode Submissions	Network
1980 (32nd)
1980 (32nd)	Richard Mulligan	Burt Campbell	Soap	"Episode 51"	ABC
1980 (32nd)	Alan Alda	Hawkeye Pierce	M*A*S*H	—N/a	CBS
1980 (32nd)	Robert Guillaume	Benson DuBois	Benson	—N/a	ABC
1980 (32nd)	Judd Hirsch	Alex Reiger	Taxi	—N/a	ABC
1980 (32nd)	Hal Linden	Barney Miller	Barney Miller	—N/a	ABC
1981 (33rd)
1981 (33rd)	Judd Hirsch	Alex Reiger	Taxi	"Elaine's Strange Triangle"	ABC
1981 (33rd)	Alan Alda	Hawkeye Pierce	M*A*S*H	—N/a	CBS
1981 (33rd)	Hal Linden	Barney Miller	Barney Miller	—N/a	ABC
1981 (33rd)	Richard Mulligan	Burt Campbell	Soap	—N/a	ABC
1981 (33rd)	John Ritter	Jack Tripper	Three's Company	—N/a	ABC
1982 (34th)
1982 (34th)	Alan Alda	Hawkeye Pierce	M*A*S*H	"Where There's a Will, There's a War"	CBS
1982 (34th)	Robert Guillaume	Benson DuBois	Benson	—N/a	ABC
1982 (34th)	Judd Hirsch	Alex Reiger	Taxi	—N/a	ABC
1982 (34th)	Hal Linden	Barney Miller	Barney Miller	—N/a	ABC
1982 (34th)	Leslie Nielsen	Frank Drebin	Police Squad!	—N/a	ABC
1983 (35th)
1983 (35th)	Judd Hirsch	Alex Reiger	Taxi	"Alex's Old Buddy"	NBC
1983 (35th)	Alan Alda	Hawkeye Pierce	M*A*S*H	—N/a	CBS
1983 (35th)	Dabney Coleman	Bill Bittinger	Buffalo Bill	—N/a	NBC
1983 (35th)	Ted Danson	Sam Malone	Cheers	—N/a	NBC
1983 (35th)	Robert Guillaume	Benson DuBois	Benson	—N/a	ABC
1984 (36th)
1984 (36th)	John Ritter	Jack Tripper	Three's Company	"Cupid Works Overtime"	ABC
1984 (36th)	Dabney Coleman	Bill Bittinger	Buffalo Bill	—N/a	NBC
1984 (36th)	Ted Danson	Sam Malone	Cheers	—N/a	NBC
1984 (36th)	Robert Guillaume	Benson DuBois	Benson	—N/a	ABC
1984 (36th)	Sherman Hemsley	George Jefferson	The Jeffersons	—N/a	CBS
1985 (37th)
1985 (37th)	Robert Guillaume	Benson DuBois	Benson	—N/a	ABC
1985 (37th)	Harry Anderson	Judge Harry Stone	Night Court	—N/a	NBC
1985 (37th)	Ted Danson	Sam Malone	Cheers	—N/a	NBC
1985 (37th)	Bob Newhart	Dick Loudon	Newhart	—N/a	CBS
1985 (37th)	Jack Warden	Harry Fox	Crazy Like a Fox	—N/a	CBS
1986 (38th)
1986 (38th)	Michael J. Fox	Alex P. Keaton	Family Ties	"The Real Thing"	NBC
1986 (38th)	Harry Anderson	Judge Harry Stone	Night Court	—N/a	NBC
1986 (38th)	Ted Danson	Sam Malone	Cheers	—N/a	NBC
1986 (38th)	Bob Newhart	Dick Loudon	Newhart	—N/a	CBS
1986 (38th)	Jack Warden	Harry Fox	Crazy Like a Fox	—N/a	CBS
1987 (39th)
1987 (39th)	Michael J. Fox	Alex P. Keaton	Family Ties	"A, My Name Is Alex"	NBC
1987 (39th)	Harry Anderson	Judge Harry Stone	Night Court	—N/a	NBC
1987 (39th)	Ted Danson	Sam Malone	Cheers	"Diamond Sam"	NBC
1987 (39th)	Bob Newhart	Dick Loudon	Newhart	"Co-Hostess Twinkie"	CBS
1987 (39th)	Bronson Pinchot	Balki Bartokomous	Perfect Strangers	—N/a	ABC
1988 (40th)
1988 (40th)	Michael J. Fox	Alex P. Keaton	Family Ties	"The Last of the Red Hot Psychologists"	NBC
1988 (40th)	Dabney Coleman	Slap Maxwell	The Slap Maxwell Story	"Episode 2"	ABC
1988 (40th)	Ted Danson	Sam Malone	Cheers	—N/a	NBC
1988 (40th)	Tim Reid	Frank Parrish	Frank's Place	"The Bridge"	CBS
1988 (40th)	John Ritter	Det. Harry Hooperman	Hooperman	"Pilot"	ABC
1989 (41st)
1989 (41st)	Richard Mulligan	Dr. Harry Weston	Empty Nest	"Pilot"	NBC
1989 (41st)	Ted Danson	Sam Malone	Cheers	"Swear to God"	NBC
1989 (41st)	Michael J. Fox	Alex P. Keaton	Family Ties	"Alex Doesn't Live Here Anymore"	NBC
1989 (41st)	John Goodman	Dan Conner	Roseanne	"Dan's Birthday Bash"	ABC
1989 (41st)	Fred Savage	Kevin Arnold	The Wonder Years	"Birthday Boy"	ABC

=== 1990s ===
Year	Actor	Role	Program	Episode Submissions	Network
1990 (42nd)
1990 (42nd)	Ted Danson	Sam Malone	Cheers	"Cry Harder, Part II"	NBC
1990 (42nd)	Craig T. Nelson	Hayden Fox	Coach	"If Keith Jackson Calls, I'll Be At My Therapist's"	ABC
1990 (42nd)	John Goodman	Dan Conner	Roseanne	"Born to Be Wild"	ABC
1990 (42nd)	Fred Savage	Kevin Arnold	The Wonder Years	"Good-bye"	ABC
1990 (42nd)	Richard Mulligan	Dr. Harry Weston	Empty Nest	"Still Growing After All These Years"	NBC
1991 (43rd)
1991 (43rd)	Burt Reynolds	Wood Newton	Evening Shade	"A Day in the Life of Wood Newton"	CBS
1991 (43rd)	Ted Danson	Sam Malone	Cheers	"Bad Neighbor Sam"	NBC
1991 (43rd)	John Goodman	Dan Conner	Roseanne	"Her Boyfriends Back"	ABC
1991 (43rd)	Richard Mulligan	Dr. Harry Weston	Empty Nest	"The Mentor"	NBC
1991 (43rd)	Craig T. Nelson	Hayden Fox	Coach	"The Break-Up"	ABC
1992 (44th)
1992 (44th)	Craig T. Nelson	Hayden Fox	Coach	"A Real Guy's Guy"	ABC
1992 (44th)	Ted Danson	Sam Malone	Cheers	"Go Make"	NBC
1992 (44th)	John Goodman	Dan Conner	Roseanne	"The Back Story"	ABC
1992 (44th)	Kelsey Grammer §	Frasier Crane	Wings	"Planes, Trains, and Visiting Cranes"	NBC
1992 (44th)	Burt Reynolds	Wood Newton	Evening Shade	"Callous Hearts of Rage"	CBS
1992 (44th)	Jerry Seinfeld	Jerry Seinfeld	Seinfeld	"The Boyfriend"	NBC
1993 (45th)
1993 (45th)	Ted Danson	Sam Malone	Cheers	"The Guy Can't Help It"	NBC
1993 (45th)	Tim Allen	Tim Taylor	Home Improvement	"Where There's a Will, There's a Way"	ABC
1993 (45th)	John Goodman	Dan Conner	Roseanne	"Terms of Estrangement, Part 2"	ABC
1993 (45th)	Jerry Seinfeld	Jerry Seinfeld	Seinfeld	"The Opera"	NBC
1993 (45th)	Garry Shandling	Larry Sanders	The Larry Sanders Show	"What Have You Done for Me Lately?"	HBO
1994 (46th)
1994 (46th)	Kelsey Grammer	Frasier Crane	Frasier	"The Good Son"	NBC
1994 (46th)	John Goodman	Dan Conner	Roseanne	"Guilt By Imagination"	ABC
1994 (46th)	John Larroquette	John Hemingway	The John Larroquette Show	"Pilot"	NBC
1994 (46th)	Paul Reiser	Paul Buchman	Mad About You	"Virtual Reality"	NBC
1994 (46th)	Jerry Seinfeld	Jerry Seinfeld	Seinfeld	"The Puffy Shirt"	NBC
1995 (47th)
1995 (47th)	Kelsey Grammer	Frasier Crane	Frasier	"Adventures in Paradise, Part 2"	NBC
1995 (47th)	John Goodman	Dan Conner	Roseanne	"The Blaming of the Shrew"	ABC
1995 (47th)	Paul Reiser	Paul Buchman	Mad About You	"Cake Fear"	NBC
1995 (47th)	Jerry Seinfeld	Jerry Seinfeld	Seinfeld	"The Diplomat's Club"	NBC
1995 (47th)	Garry Shandling	Larry Sanders	The Larry Sanders Show	"The Mr. Sharon Stone Show"	HBO
1996 (48th)
1996 (48th)	John Lithgow	Dick Solomon	3rd Rock from the Sun	"Dick, Smoker"	NBC
1996 (48th)	Kelsey Grammer	Frasier Crane	Frasier	"You Can Go Home Again"	NBC
1996 (48th)	Paul Reiser	Paul Buchman	Mad About You	"Dream Weaver"	NBC
1996 (48th)	Jerry Seinfeld	Jerry Seinfeld	Seinfeld	"The Gum"	NBC
1996 (48th)	Garry Shandling	Larry Sanders	The Larry Sanders Show	—N/a	HBO
1997 (49th)
1997 (49th)	John Lithgow	Dick Solomon	3rd Rock from the Sun	"See Dick Continue to Run"	NBC
1997 (49th)	Michael J. Fox	Mike Flaherty	Spin City	"Prototype"	ABC
1997 (49th)	Kelsey Grammer	Frasier Crane	Frasier	"Ham Radio"	NBC
1997 (49th)	Paul Reiser	Paul Buchman	Mad About You	"The Birth"	NBC
1997 (49th)	Garry Shandling	Larry Sanders	The Larry Sanders Show	"Everybody Loves Larry"	HBO
1998 (50th)
1998 (50th)	Kelsey Grammer	Frasier Crane	Frasier	"Frasier's Imaginary Friend"	NBC
1998 (50th)	Michael J. Fox	Mike Flaherty	Spin City	"The Goodbye Girl"	ABC
1998 (50th)	John Lithgow	Dick Solomon	3rd Rock from the Sun	"Stuck with Dick"	NBC
1998 (50th)	Paul Reiser	Paul Buchman	Mad About You	"The Conversation"	NBC
1998 (50th)	Garry Shandling	Larry Sanders	The Larry Sanders Show	"Flip"	HBO
1999 (51st)
1999 (51st)	John Lithgow	Dick Solomon	3rd Rock from the Sun	"What's Love Got to Do, Got to Do with Dick?"	NBC
1999 (51st)	Michael J. Fox	Mike Flaherty	Spin City	"Gone with the Wind"	ABC
1999 (51st)	Kelsey Grammer	Frasier Crane	Frasier	"Merry Christmas, Mrs. Moskowitz"	NBC
1999 (51st)	Paul Reiser	Paul Buchman	Mad About You	"The Final Frontier"	NBC
1999 (51st)	Ray Romano	Raymond Barone	Everybody Loves Raymond	"How They Met"	CBS

=== 2000s ===
Year	Actor	Role	Program	Episode Submissions	Network
2000 (52nd)
2000 (52nd)	Michael J. Fox	Mike Flaherty	Spin City	"Goodbye"	ABC
2000 (52nd)	Kelsey Grammer	Frasier Crane	Frasier	"Radio Wars"	NBC
2000 (52nd)	John Lithgow	Dick Solomon	3rd Rock from the Sun	"Frankie Goes to Rutherford"	NBC
2000 (52nd)	Eric McCormack	Will Truman	Will & Grace	"Oh Dad, Poor Dad, He's Kept Me in the Closet and I'm So Sad"	NBC
2000 (52nd)	Ray Romano	Raymond Barone	Everybody Loves Raymond	"Bad Moon Rising"	CBS
2001 (53rd)
2001 (53rd)	Eric McCormack	Will Truman	Will & Grace	"Lows in the Mid-Eighties"	NBC
2001 (53rd)	Kelsey Grammer	Frasier Crane	Frasier	"Frasier's Edge"	NBC
2001 (53rd)	John Lithgow	Dick Solomon	3rd Rock from the Sun	"Red, White, and Dick"	NBC
2001 (53rd)	Frankie Muniz	Malcolm	Malcolm in the Middle	"Bowling"	Fox
2001 (53rd)	Ray Romano	Raymond Barone	Everybody Loves Raymond	"Ray's Journal"	CBS
2002 (54th)
2002 (54th)	Ray Romano	Raymond Barone	Everybody Loves Raymond	"The Breakup Tape"	CBS
2002 (54th)	Kelsey Grammer	Frasier Crane	Frasier	"The Love You Fake"	NBC
2002 (54th)	Matt LeBlanc	Joey Tribbiani	Friends	"The One Where Joey Tells Rachel"	NBC
2002 (54th)	Bernie Mac	Bernie McCullough	The Bernie Mac Show	"Saving Bernie Mac"	Fox
2002 (54th)	Matthew Perry	Chandler Bing	Friends	"The One Where Chandler Takes a Bath"	NBC
2003 (55th)
2003 (55th)	Tony Shalhoub	Adrian Monk	Monk	"Mr. Monk and the Airplane"	USA
2003 (55th)	Larry David	Larry David	Curb Your Enthusiasm	"The Special Section"	HBO
2003 (55th)	Matt LeBlanc	Joey Tribbiani	Friends	"The One in Barbados"	NBC
2003 (55th)	Bernie Mac	Bernie McCullough	The Bernie Mac Show	"The Incredible Bulk"	Fox
2003 (55th)	Eric McCormack	Will Truman	Will & Grace	"The Kid Stays Out of the Picture"	NBC
2003 (55th)	Ray Romano	Raymond Barone	Everybody Loves Raymond	"Counseling"	CBS
2004 (56th)
2004 (56th)	Kelsey Grammer	Frasier Crane	Frasier	"The Doctor is Out"	NBC
2004 (56th)	Larry David	Larry David	Curb Your Enthusiasm	"Opening Night"	HBO
2004 (56th)	Matt LeBlanc	Joey Tribbiani	Friends	"The One Where the Stripper Cries"	NBC
2004 (56th)	John Ritter (posthumously)	Paul Hennessy	8 Simple Rules	"Premiere"	ABC
2004 (56th)	Tony Shalhoub	Adrian Monk	Monk	"Mr. Monk Goes to the Theater"	USA
2005 (57th)
2005 (57th)	Tony Shalhoub	Adrian Monk	Monk	"Mr. Monk Takes His Medicine"	USA
2005 (57th)	Jason Bateman	Michael Bluth	Arrested Development	"Good Grief"	Fox
2005 (57th)	Zach Braff	J.D.	Scrubs	"My Last Chance"	NBC
2005 (57th)	Eric McCormack	Will Truman	Will & Grace	"Queens for a Day"	NBC
2005 (57th)	Ray Romano	Raymond Barone	Everybody Loves Raymond	"The Power of No"	CBS
2006 (58th)
2006 (58th)	Tony Shalhoub	Adrian Monk	Monk	"Mr. Monk Bumps His Head"	USA
2006 (58th)	Steve Carell	Michael Scott	The Office	"The Injury"	NBC
2006 (58th)	Larry David	Larry David	Curb Your Enthusiasm	"The Ski Lift"	HBO
2006 (58th)	Kevin James	Doug Heffernan	The King of Queens	"Pole Lox"	CBS
2006 (58th)	Charlie Sheen	Charlie Harper	Two and a Half Men	"The Unfortunate Little Schnauser"	CBS
2007 (59th)
2007 (59th)	Ricky Gervais	Andy Millman	Extras	"Sir Ian McKellen"	HBO
2007 (59th)	Alec Baldwin	Jack Donaghy	30 Rock	"Hiatus"	NBC
2007 (59th)	Steve Carell	Michael Scott	The Office	"Business School"	NBC
2007 (59th)	Tony Shalhoub	Adrian Monk	Monk	"Mr. Monk Gets a New Shrink"	USA
2007 (59th)	Charlie Sheen	Charlie Harper	Two and a Half Men	"Who's Vod Kanockers?"	CBS
2008 (60th)
2008 (60th)	Alec Baldwin	Jack Donaghy	30 Rock	"Rosemary's Baby"	NBC
2008 (60th)	Steve Carell	Michael Scott	The Office	"Goodbye, Toby"	NBC
2008 (60th)	Lee Pace	Ned	Pushing Daisies	"Pie-lette"	ABC
2008 (60th)	Tony Shalhoub	Adrian Monk	Monk	"Mr. Monk and the Naked Man"	USA
2008 (60th)	Charlie Sheen	Charlie Harper	Two and a Half Men	"Is There a Mrs. Waffles?"	CBS
2009 (61st)
2009 (61st)	Alec Baldwin	Jack Donaghy	30 Rock	"Generalissimo"	NBC
2009 (61st)	Steve Carell	Michael Scott	The Office	"Broke"	NBC
2009 (61st)	Jemaine Clement	Jemaine	Flight of the Conchords	"Unnatural Love"	HBO
2009 (61st)	Jim Parsons	Sheldon Cooper	The Big Bang Theory	"The Bath Item Gift Hypothesis"	CBS
2009 (61st)	Tony Shalhoub	Adrian Monk	Monk	"Mr. Monk and the Miracle"	USA
2009 (61st)	Charlie Sheen	Charlie Harper	Two and a Half Men	"The 'Ocu' or the 'Pado'?"	CBS

=== 2010s ===
Year	Actor	Role	Program	Episode Submissions	Network
2010 (62nd)
2010 (62nd)	Jim Parsons	Sheldon Cooper	The Big Bang Theory	"The Pants Alternative"	CBS
2010 (62nd)	Alec Baldwin	Jack Donaghy	30 Rock	"Don Geiss, America and Hope"	NBC
2010 (62nd)	Steve Carell	Michael Scott	The Office	"The Cover-Up"	NBC
2010 (62nd)	Larry David	Larry David	Curb Your Enthusiasm	"Seinfeld"	HBO
2010 (62nd)	Matthew Morrison	Will Schuester	Glee	"Mash-Up"	Fox
2010 (62nd)	Tony Shalhoub	Adrian Monk	Monk	"Mr. Monk and the End"	USA
2011 (63rd)
2011 (63rd)	Jim Parsons	Sheldon Cooper	The Big Bang Theory	"The Agreement Dissection"	CBS
2011 (63rd)	Alec Baldwin	Jack Donaghy	30 Rock	"Respawn"	NBC
2011 (63rd)	Louis C.K.	Louie	Louie	"Bully"	FX
2011 (63rd)	Steve Carell	Michael Scott	The Office	"Goodbye, Michael"	NBC
2011 (63rd)	Johnny Galecki	Leonard Hofstadter	The Big Bang Theory	"The Benefactor Factor"	CBS
2011 (63rd)	Matt LeBlanc	Matt LeBlanc	Episodes	"Episode Seven"	Showtime
2012 (64th)
2012 (64th)	Jon Cryer	Alan Harper	Two and a Half Men	"Frodo's Headshots"	CBS
2012 (64th)	Alec Baldwin	Jack Donaghy	30 Rock	"Live from Studio 6H"	NBC
2012 (64th)	Louis C.K.	Louie	Louie	"Duckling"	FX
2012 (64th)	Don Cheadle	Marty Kaan	House of Lies	"The Gods of Dangerous Financial Instruments"	Showtime
2012 (64th)	Larry David	Larry David	Curb Your Enthusiasm	"Palestinian Chicken"	HBO
2012 (64th)	Jim Parsons	Sheldon Cooper	The Big Bang Theory	"The Werewolf Transformation"	CBS
2013 (65th)
2013 (65th)	Jim Parsons	Sheldon Cooper	The Big Bang Theory	"The Habitation Configuration"	CBS
2013 (65th)	Alec Baldwin	Jack Donaghy	30 Rock	"A Goon's Deed in a Weary World"	NBC
2013 (65th)	Jason Bateman	Michael Bluth	Arrested Development	"Flight of the Phoenix"	Netflix
2013 (65th)	Louis C.K.	Louie	Louie	"Daddy's Girlfriend, Part 1"	FX
2013 (65th)	Don Cheadle	Marty Kaan	House of Lies	"Hostile Takeover"	Showtime
2013 (65th)	Matt LeBlanc	Matt LeBlanc	Episodes	"Episode Two"	Showtime
2014 (66th)
2014 (66th)	Jim Parsons	Sheldon Cooper	The Big Bang Theory	"The Relationship Diremption"	CBS
2014 (66th)	Louis C.K.	Louie	Louie	"Model"	FX
2014 (66th)	Don Cheadle	Marty Kaan	House of Lies	"Wreckage"	Showtime
2014 (66th)	Ricky Gervais	Derek Noakes	Derek	"Episode 6"	Netflix
2014 (66th)	Matt LeBlanc	Matt LeBlanc	Episodes	"Episode Six"	Showtime
2014 (66th)	William H. Macy	Frank Gallagher	Shameless	"Lazarus"	Showtime
2015 (67th)
2015 (67th)	Jeffrey Tambor	Maura Pfefferman	Transparent	"The Letting Go"	Amazon
2015 (67th)	Anthony Anderson	Andre Johnson	Black-ish	"Sex, Lies, and Vasectomies"	ABC
2015 (67th)	Louis C.K.	Louie	Louie	"Bobby's House"	FX
2015 (67th)	Don Cheadle	Marty Kaan	House of Lies	"It's a Box Inside a Box Inside a Box, Dipshit"	Showtime
2015 (67th)	Will Forte	Phil Miller	The Last Man on Earth	"Alive in Tucson"	Fox
2015 (67th)	Matt LeBlanc	Matt LeBlanc	Episodes	"Episode Five"	Showtime
2015 (67th)	William H. Macy	Frank Gallagher	Shameless	"A Night to Remem... Wait, What?"	Showtime
2016 (68th)
2016 (68th)	Jeffrey Tambor	Maura Pfefferman	Transparent	"Man on the Land"	Amazon
2016 (68th)	Anthony Anderson	Andre Johnson	Black-ish	"Hope"	ABC
2016 (68th)	Aziz Ansari	Dev Shah	Master of None	"Parents"	Netflix
2016 (68th)	Will Forte	Phil Miller	The Last Man on Earth	"30 Years of Science Down the Tubes"	Fox
2016 (68th)	William H. Macy	Frank Gallagher	Shameless	"I Only Miss Her When I'm Breathing"	Showtime
2016 (68th)	Thomas Middleditch	Richard Hendricks	Silicon Valley	"The Empty Chair"	HBO
2017 (69th)
2017 (69th)	Donald Glover	Earn Marks	Atlanta	"The Big Bang"	FX
2017 (69th)	Anthony Anderson	Andre Johnson	Black-ish	"Lemons"	ABC
2017 (69th)	Aziz Ansari	Dev Shah	Master of None	"The Dinner Party"	Netflix
2017 (69th)	Zach Galifianakis	Chip and Dale Baskets	Baskets	"Freaks"	FX
2017 (69th)	William H. Macy	Frank Gallagher	Shameless	"You Sold Me the Laundromat, Remember?"	Showtime
2017 (69th)	Jeffrey Tambor	Maura Pfefferman	Transparent	"Elizah"	Amazon
2018 (70th)
2018 (70th)	Bill Hader	Barry Berkman / Barry Block	Barry	"Chapter Seven: Loud, Fast, and Keep Going"	HBO
2018 (70th)	Anthony Anderson	Andre Johnson	Black-ish	"Advance to Go (Collect $200)"	ABC
2018 (70th)	Ted Danson	Michael	The Good Place	"Dance Dance Resolution"	NBC
2018 (70th)	Larry David	Larry David	Curb Your Enthusiasm	"Fatwa!"	HBO
2018 (70th)	Donald Glover	Earn Marks	Atlanta	"Teddy Perkins"	FX
2018 (70th)	William H. Macy	Frank Gallagher	Shameless	"Sleepwalking"	Showtime
2019 (71st)
2019 (71st)	Bill Hader	Barry Berkman / Barry Block	Barry	"The Truth Has a Ring to It"	HBO
2019 (71st)	Anthony Anderson	Andre Johnson	Black-ish	"Purple Rain"	ABC
2019 (71st)	Don Cheadle	Maurice Monroe	Black Monday	"365"	Showtime
2019 (71st)	Ted Danson	Michael	The Good Place	"The Worst Possible Use of Free Will"	NBC
2019 (71st)	Michael Douglas	Sandy Kominsky	The Kominsky Method	"Chapter One: An Actor Avoids"	Netflix
2019 (71st)	Eugene Levy	Johnny Rose	Schitt's Creek	"Rock On!"	Pop TV

=== 2020s ===
Year	Actor	Role	Program	Episode Submission	Network
2020 (72nd)
2020 (72nd)	Eugene Levy	Johnny Rose	Schitt's Creek	"The Pitch"	Pop TV
2020 (72nd)	Anthony Anderson	Andre Johnson	Black-ish	"Love, Boat"	ABC
2020 (72nd)	Don Cheadle	Maurice Monroe	Black Monday	"Who Are You Supposed to Be?"	Showtime
2020 (72nd)	Ted Danson	Michael	The Good Place	"Whenever You're Ready"	NBC
2020 (72nd)	Michael Douglas	Sandy Kominsky	The Kominsky Method	"Chapter 12: A Libido Sits in the Fridge"	Netflix
2020 (72nd)	Ramy Youssef	Ramy Hassan	Ramy	"You Are Naked in Front of Your Sheikh"	Hulu
2021 (73rd)
2021 (73rd)	Jason Sudeikis	Ted Lasso	Ted Lasso	"Pilot"	Apple TV+
2021 (73rd)	Anthony Anderson	Andre Johnson	Black-ish	"What About Gary?"	ABC
2021 (73rd)	Michael Douglas	Sandy Kominsky	The Kominsky Method	"Chapter 20. The round toes, of the high shoes"	Netflix
2021 (73rd)	William H. Macy	Frank Gallagher	Shameless	"Father Frank, Full of Grace"	Showtime
2021 (73rd)	Kenan Thompson	Kenan Williams	Kenan	"Flirting"	NBC
2022 (74th)
2022 (74th)	Jason Sudeikis	Ted Lasso	Ted Lasso	"No Weddings and a Funeral"	Apple TV+
2022 (74th)	Donald Glover	Earn Marks	Atlanta	"Sinterklaas is Coming to Town"	FX
2022 (74th)	Bill Hader	Barry Berkman / Barry Block	Barry	"starting now"	HBO
2022 (74th)	Nicholas Hoult	Peter III / Yemelyan Pugachev	The Great	"Wedding"	Hulu
2022 (74th)	Steve Martin	Charles-Haden Savage	Only Murders in the Building	"Open and Shut"	Hulu
2022 (74th)	Martin Short	Oliver Putnam	Only Murders in the Building	"How Well Do You Know Your Neighbors?"	Hulu
2023 (75th)
2023 (75th)	Jeremy Allen White	Carmen "Carmy" Berzatto	The Bear	"Braciole"	FX
2023 (75th)	Bill Hader	Barry Berkman / Barry Block	Barry	"you're charming"	HBO
2023 (75th)	Jason Segel	Jimmy Laird	Shrinking	"Imposter Syndrome"	Apple TV+
2023 (75th)	Martin Short	Oliver Putnam	Only Murders in the Building	"The Tell"	Hulu
2023 (75th)	Jason Sudeikis	Ted Lasso	Ted Lasso	"So Long, Farewell"	Apple TV+
2024 (76th)
2024 (76th)	Jeremy Allen White	Carmen "Carmy" Berzatto	The Bear	"The Bear"	FX
2024 (76th)	Matt Berry	Leslie "Laszlo" Cravensworth	What We Do in the Shadows	"Pride Parade"	FX
2024 (76th)	Larry David	Larry David	Curb Your Enthusiasm	"Vertical Drop, Horizontal Tug"	HBO
2024 (76th)	Steve Martin	Charles-Haden Savage	Only Murders in the Building	"Sitzprobe"	Hulu
2024 (76th)	Martin Short	Oliver Putnam	Only Murders in the Building	"Ah, Love!"	Hulu
2024 (76th)	D'Pharaoh Woon-A-Tai	Bear Smallhill	Reservation Dogs	"Maximus"	FX
2025 (77th)
2025 (77th)	Seth Rogen	Matt Remick	The Studio	"The Pediatric Oncologist"	Apple TV+
2025 (77th)	Adam Brody	Noah Roklov	Nobody Wants This	"Pilot"	Netflix
2025 (77th)	Jason Segel	Jimmy Laird	Shrinking	"The Drugs Don't Work"	Apple TV+
2025 (77th)	Martin Short	Oliver Putnam	Only Murders in the Building	"Escape from Planet Klongo"	Hulu
2025 (77th)	Jeremy Allen White	Carmen "Carmy" Berzatto	The Bear	"Tomorrow"	FX
2026 (78th)
2026 (78th)	Matthew Rhys	Tom Loftis	Widow's Bay	"The Inaugural Swim"	Apple TV
2026 (78th)	Yahya Abdul-Mateen II	Simon Williams / Wonder Man	Wonder Man	"Matinee"	Disney+
2026 (78th)	Steve Carell	Greg Russo	Rooster	"Angry, Like an Angry Person"	HBO
2026 (78th)	Jason Segel	Jimmy Laird	Shrinking	"The Bodyguard of Sadness"	Apple TV
2026 (78th)	Martin Short	Oliver Putnam	Only Murders in the Building	"Flatbush"	Hulu

== Programs with multiple awards ==
4 wins

- All in the Family
- Frasier
- The Big Bang Theory

3 wins

- 3rd Rock from the Sun
- Get Smart
- The Odd Couple
- Family Ties
- Monk

2 wins

- 30 Rock
- Barry
- The Bear
- The Defenders
- The Dick Van Dyke Show
- M*A*S*H
- Taxi
- Cheers
- Ted Lasso
- Transparent

== Performers with multiple wins ==
4 wins

- Michael J. Fox (3 consecutive)
- Kelsey Grammer (2 consecutive)
- Carroll O'Connor (3 consecutive)
- Jim Parsons (2 consecutive twice)

3 wins

- Don Adams (consecutive)
- John Lithgow (2 consecutive)
- Tony Shalhoub (2 consecutive)
- Dick Van Dyke (consecutive)

2 wins

- Alan Alda
- Alec Baldwin (consecutive)
- Ted Danson
- Bill Hader (consecutive)
- Judd Hirsch
- Jack Klugman
- Richard Mulligan
- Jason Sudeikis (consecutive)
- Jeffrey Tambor (consecutive)
- Jeremy Allen White (consecutive)

== Programs with multiple nominations ==
11 nominations

- Cheers
- M*A*S*H

10 nominations

- Frasier
- The Odd Couple

8 nominations

- All in the Family
- Monk

7 nominations

- 30 Rock
- Barney Miller
- Black-ish
- The Big Bang Theory
- Curb Your Enthusiasm
- Only Murders in the Building
- Roseanne

6 nominations

- 3rd Rock from the Sun
- Everybody Loves Raymond
- The Office
- Mad About You
- Shameless

5 nominations

- Benson
- The Larry Sanders Show
- Louie
- Seinfeld
- Taxi
- Two and a Half Men

4 nominations

- Barry
- The Bob Cummings Show
- The Danny Thomas Show
- The Dick Van Dyke Show
- Episodes
- Family Affair
- Family Ties
- Friends
- Get Smart
- House of Lies
- The Phil Silvers Show
- Spin City
- Will & Grace

3 nominations

- Atlanta
- The Bear
- Chico and the Man
- Coach
- Empty Nest
- Father Knows Best
- The Good Place
- Happy Days
- The Kominsky Method
- Newhart
- Night Court
- Sanford and Son
- Shrinking
- Three's Company
- Ted Lasso
- Transparent

2 nominations

- Arrested Development
- The Bernie Mac Show
- Black Monday
- Buffalo Bill
- Crazy Like a Fox
- The Defenders
- Dragnet
- Evening Shade
- Hennesey
- Hogan's Heroes
- The Jack Benny Program
- The Jackie Gleason Show
- The Last Man on Earth
- Master of None
- Naked City
- Perry Mason
- Schitt's Creek
- Soap
- The Wonder Years
- The Untouchables

== Performers with multiple nominations ==
14 nominations

- Ted Danson*

11 nominations

- Alan Alda*
- Kelsey Grammer*

8 nominations

- Michael J. Fox*
- Carroll O'Connor*
- Tony Shalhoub*

7 nominations

- Anthony Anderson
- Alec Baldwin*
- Steve Carell
- Larry David
- John Goodman
- Matt LeBlanc
- Hal Linden

6 nominations

- Don Cheadle
- John Lithgow*
- William H. Macy
- Jim Parsons*
- Paul Reiser
- Ray Romano*

5 nominations

- Louis C.K.
- Robert Cummings
- Robert Guillaume*
- Judd Hirsch*
- Jack Klugman
- Richard Mulligan
- Tony Randall*
- John Ritter*
- Jerry Seinfeld
- Garry Shandling
- Martin Short

4 nominations

- Don Adams*
- Bill Hader*
- Eric McCormack*
- Charlie Sheen
- Phil Silvers*
- Danny Thomas*

3 nominations

- Jack Albertson*
- Harry Anderson
- Dabney Coleman
- Michael Douglas
- Redd Foxx
- Jackie Gleason
- Donald Glover*
- Brian Keith
- Craig T. Nelson*
- Bob Newhart
- Jason Segel
- Jason Sudeikis*
- Jeffrey Tambor*
- Dick Van Dyke*
- Henry Winkler
- Jeremy Allen White*
- Robert Young*

2 nominations

- Aziz Ansari
- Jason Bateman
- Jack Benny*
- Sid Caesar*
- Bob Crane
- Will Forte
- Ricky Gervais*
- Eugene Levy*
- Bernie Mac
- Steve Martin
- Burt Reynolds*
- Fred Savage
- Jack Warden

(*) refers to those who have won in this category

== Superlatives ==
Superlative	Performer	Program	Year	Age
Oldest Winner	Eugene Levy	Schitt's Creek	2020 (72nd)	73
Oldest Nominee	Steve Martin	Only Murders in the Building	2024 (76th)	78
Youngest Winner	Michael J. Fox	Family Ties	1986 (38th)	25
Youngest Nominee	Fred Savage	The Wonder Years	1989 (41st)	13

== Total awards by network ==
- NBC – 26
- CBS – 19
- ABC – 11
- Apple TV – 3
- HBO/HBO Max – 3
- USA – 3
- Amazon – 2
- FX – 1
- Pop TV - 1

== See also ==
- Actor Award for Outstanding Performance by a Male Actor in a Comedy Series
- Best Actor
- Critics' Choice Television Award for Best Actor in a Comedy Series
- Golden Globe Award for Best Actor – Television Series Musical or Comedy
- List of acting awards
- List of television awards for Best Actor
- Primetime Emmy Award for Outstanding Lead Actress in a Comedy Series
- Primetime Emmy Award for Outstanding Supporting Actor in a Comedy Series
- Primetime Emmy Award for Outstanding Supporting Actress in a Comedy Series
- Primetime Emmy Award for Outstanding Lead Actor in a Drama Series
- Primetime Emmy Award for Outstanding Lead Actress in a Drama Series
- Primetime Emmy Award for Outstanding Supporting Actor in a Drama Series
- Primetime Emmy Award for Outstanding Supporting Actress in a Drama Series
- Primetime Emmy Award for Outstanding Lead Actor in a Limited or Anthology Series or Movie
- Primetime Emmy Award for Outstanding Lead Actress in a Limited or Anthology Series or Movie
- Primetime Emmy Award for Outstanding Supporting Actor in a Limited or Anthology Series or Movie
- Primetime Emmy Award for Outstanding Supporting Actress in a Limited or Anthology Series or Movie
- TCA Award for Individual Achievement in Drama
