= Danika Yarosh =

American actress (born 1998)

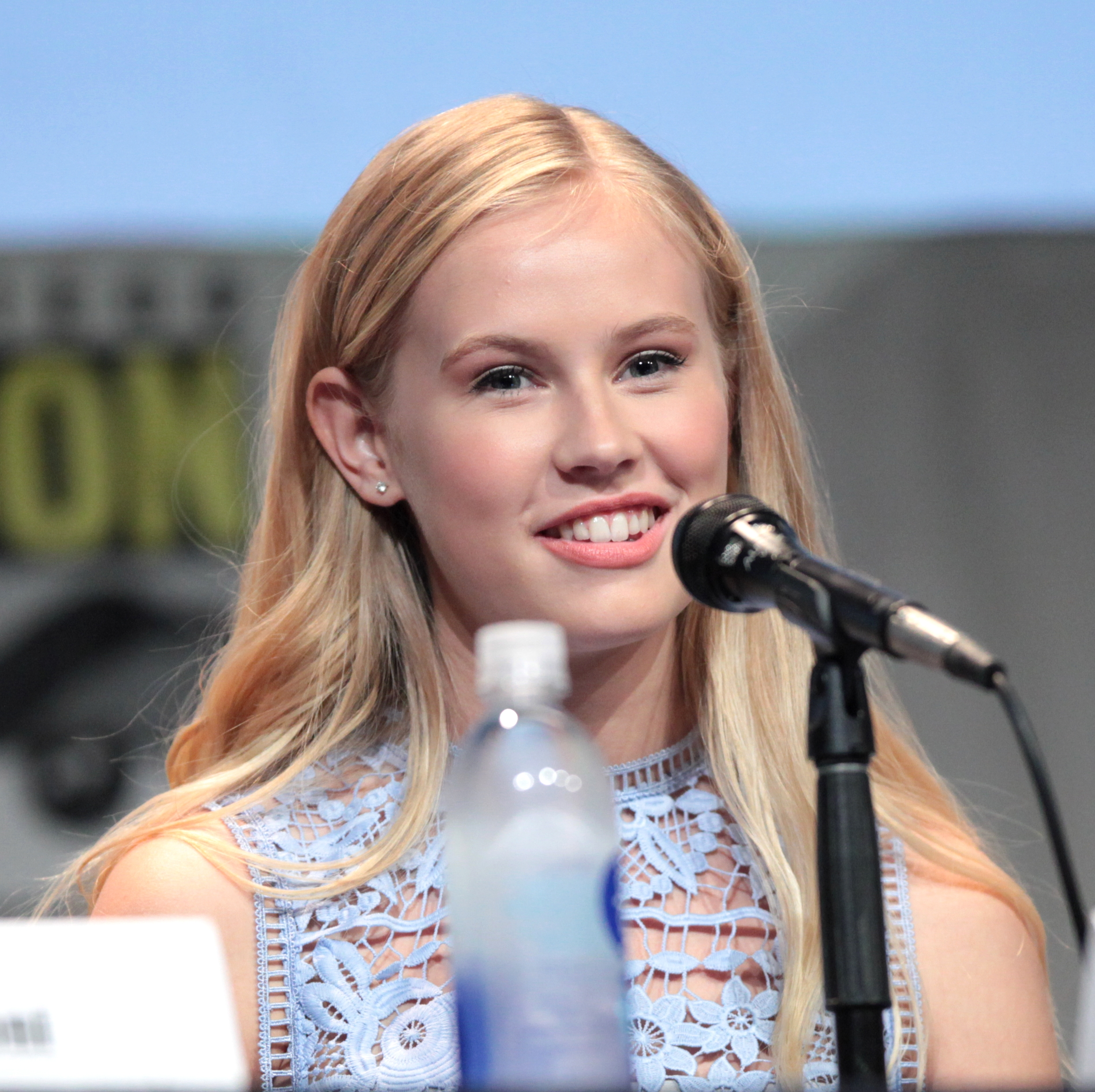
- Yarosh at the 2015 San Diego Comic-Con
- Born: October 1, 1998 (age 27)
- Occupation: Actress
- Years active: 2004–present

Danika Yarosh (born October 1, 1998) is an American actress. She appeared in the Showtime series Shameless and in the NBC series Heroes Reborn. She co‐starred with Tom Cruise in Jack Reacher: Never Go Back (2016).

== Early life ==
Yarosh is a native of Bedminster, New Jersey, the daughter of Victor and Linda Yarosh. She has three siblings, an older sister, Amanda, who also acts, an older brother, Erik, and a younger brother, Peter. Her father is a former member of the United States Air Force. Yarosh is of Ukrainian descent; her paternal grandfather, William Yarosh, was born in Ukraine, and her maternal grandmother Irene Rempter’s family originated from Kostopil, Ukraine.

== Career ==
Yarosh first appeared on film at the age of 5 as an extra in The Stepford Wives (2004), starring Nicole Kidman, which filmed in her home town. She began studying acting and dance, first appearing off-Broadway, and then won the role of ballet dancer Karen in the 2009 Broadway production of Billy Elliot at the Imperial Theatre, when she was 10.

Yarosh moved with her mother to Los Angeles at age 12, and began booking bit parts on television, including the series 30 Rock and Law & Order: Special Victims Unit. She appeared in the 2012 film The Color of Time, playing the first love of poet C. K. Williams. Yarosh then had recurring roles on the Nick at Nite sitcom See Dad Run, and the Showtime series Shameless, replacing Dove Cameron in the latter series. She postponed attending college full time when she was cast in the NBC sci-fi miniseries Heroes Reborn.

Yarosh played Samantha, the would-be daughter of Jack Reacher (Tom Cruise) in the 2016 action film Jack Reacher: Never Go Back. She appeared in the 2018 biographical film The Miracle Season, playing Caroline "Line" Found, a star Iowa City West High School volleyball player, whose team went on to win the state championship after she was killed in a moped accident. She appeared in Back Roads, a 2018 film directed by Alex Pettyfer. Yarosh joined the cast of the Netflix series Greenhouse Academy for its third season, replacing actress Grace Van Dien in the role of Brooke Osmond. In 2019, she signed on to the second season of the USA Network series The Purge, recurring as college student Kelen Stewart.

== Filmography ==
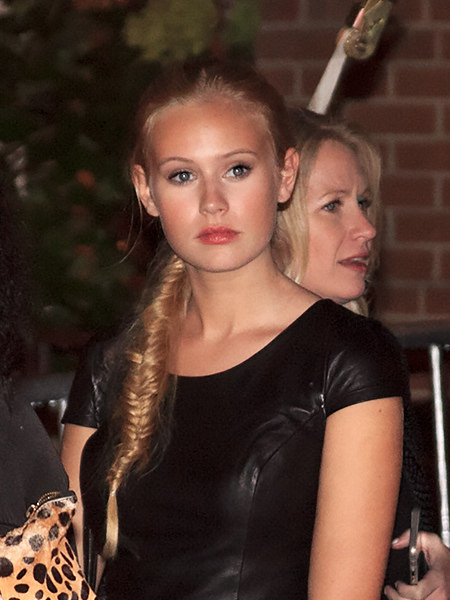
Yarosh at the Toronto International Film Festival, 2015

Television and film roles
Year	Title	Role	Notes
2004	The Stepford Wives	Child in town fair	Uncredited
2010	Crush	Sarah	Short film
2010	Celebrity Ghost Stories	Young Daryl	Episode #2.10
2010	A Breath Away	Maria	Short film
2011	30 Rock	School Girl	Episode: "TGS Hates Women"
2011	Angel	Abbey	Short film
2011	Nerd Wars	Ivanka	Short film
2011	A Christmas Wedding Tail	Madison	TV movie
2012	In Plain Sight	Bonnie Arnett/Bonnie Wilson	Episode: "The Merry Wives of Witsec"
2012	Retribution	Ashlee Simmons	TV movie
2012	The Color of Time	Irene	Film, a.k.a. Tar
2013	1600 Penn	Jessica	Episode: "Frosting/Nixon"
2013–2014	See Dad Run	Olivia	Recurring role (seasons 2–3)
2014–2015	Shameless	Holly Herkimer	Recurring role (seasons 4–5)
2010–2015	Law & Order: Special Victims Unit	Ariel Thornhill/Nicole Goshgarian	3 episodes
2015–2016	Heroes Reborn	Malina Bennett	Main cast
2016	Jack Reacher: Never Go Back	Samantha Dutton	Film
2017	Chicago P.D.	Ellie Olstern	Episode: "I Remember Her Now "
2018	The Miracle Season	Caroline "Line" Found	Film
2018	Back Roads	Ashlee	Film
2019-2020	Greenhouse Academy	Brooke Osmond	Main cast (seasons 3–4)
2019	Deadly Switch^{[A]}	Monica	Main cast, a.k.a. Perfect Family, Perfect Murder in UK
2019	The Purge	Kelen Stewart	Recurring role
2021	Shameless Hall of Shame	Holly Herkimer	Episode: "Debbie, Carl & Liam: They Grow Up So Fast"
2022	The Get Back Girl	Amelia Armstrong	Unfinished, filmed 2022
2023	Great White Lies	Sofia	Short film

== Awards and nominations ==
Year	Award	Category	Work	Result	Ref(s)
2014	Young Artist Award	Best Performance in a TV Series - Guest Starring Young Actress 14-16	1600 Penn	Won	
2014	Young Artist Award	Best Performance in a TV Series - Recurring Young Actress	See Dad Run	Nominated	
2015	Young Artist Award	Best Performance in a TV Series - Recurring Young Actress 14-16	Shameless	Nominated	
2016	Young Artist Award	Best Performance in a TV Movie, Miniseries or Special - Leading Young Actress	Heroes Reborn	Nominated	
2016	Young Artist Award	Best Performance in a TV Series - Guest Starring Young Actress 14-21	Law & Order: Special Victims Unit	Nominated	
2016	Young Entertainer Awards	Best Supporting Young Actress - Television Movie, Mini Series or Special	Heroes Reborn	Nominated	
2016	Young Entertainer Awards	Best Guest Starring Young Actress 14-16 - Television Series	Law & Order: Special Victims Unit	Nominated	
