= Steve Kazee =

American actor and singer (born 1975)

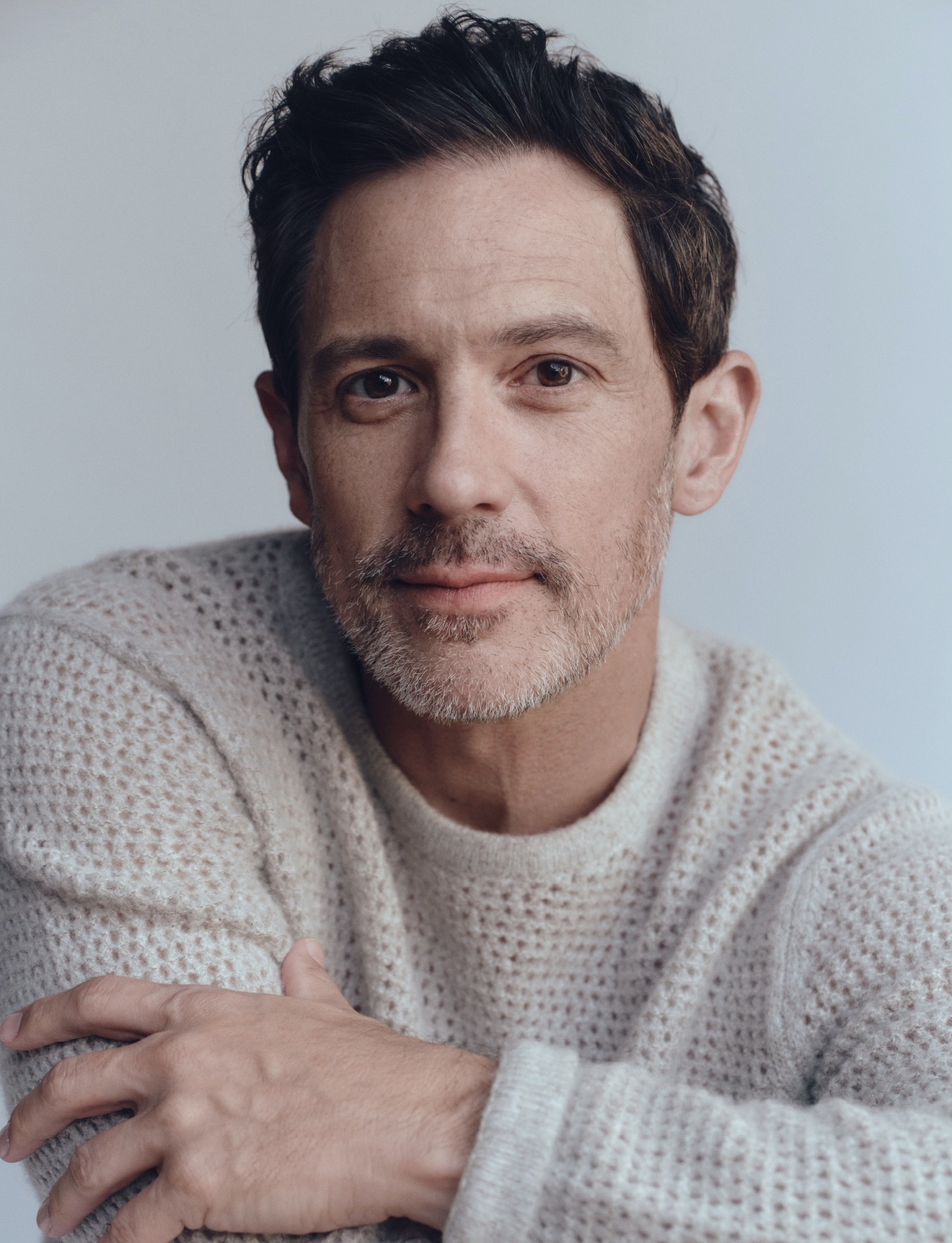
- Born: Steven Michael Kazee; October 30, 1975 (age 51); Ashland, Kentucky, U.S.
- Education: Morehead State University (BA); New York University (MFA)
- Occupations: Actor, singer, musician
- Years active: 2004–present
- Partner(s): Jenna Dewan (2018–present; engaged)
- Children: 2

Steven Michael Kazee (born October 30, 1975) is an American actor and singer. He is best known for starring as Guy in the musical Once for which he was awarded the 2012 Tony Award for Best Performance by a Leading Actor in a Musical. Kazee began his professional acting career in the mid-2000s, and from 2005 until 2013 acted in a series of Broadway productions including Spamalot, 110 in the Shade, and Once. Following the success of Once, Kazee acted on multiple television series, most notably playing Gus Pfender in the fifth season of Shameless. Kazee returned to theater in 2018, starring as Edward in the Chicago tryout of Pretty Woman: The Musical.

== Early life and education ==
Kazee was born and raised in Ashland, Kentucky. He is an alumnus of Fairview High School and Morehead State University. Kazee moved to New York City in 2002 and received his MFA from the Graduate Acting Program at NYU's Tisch School of the Arts in 2005.

== Career ==
=== Theatre ===
He appeared in the New York Shakespeare Festival's As You Like It in June 2005. He appeared in Seascape on Broadway in November 2005 as the Leslie understudy. In January 2006, he appeared as Timmy Cleary in The Subject Was Roses, which played at the Kennedy Center. He was later cast as a replacement for Sir Lancelot in Spamalot on Broadway in April 2006. In 2007, he starred as Bill Starbuck in the revival of 110 in the Shade on Broadway, In 2008, he played Sobinsky in To Be Or Not To Be, which ran from September 16 through November 16 at the Samuel J. Friedman Theatre.

Kazee starred as Guy in the stage adaptation of Once, He originated the role off-Broadway when it opened at the New York Theatre Workshop on December 6, 2011. Once began previews on Broadway on February 28, 2012, and opened on March 18, 2012, at the Bernard B. Jacobs Theatre. Kazee made several TV appearances promoting Once, including Late Show with David Letterman and Today Show. Kazee won the 2012 Tony Award for Best Performance by a Leading Actor in a Musical. Kazee and the cast of Once won the Grammy for Best Musical Theater Album at the 55th Annual Grammy Awards.

He is featured on Christina Perri's song "A Thousand Years, Pt. 2", which appears on The Twilight Saga: Breaking Dawn – Part 2 (Original Motion Picture Soundtrack).

In 2017 it was announced that Kazee would star in the stage adaptation of the 1990 film Pretty Woman, opposite Samantha Barks in her Broadway debut. The musical, titled Pretty Woman: The Musical, was directed by Jerry Mitchell and premiered in Chicago in March 2018 and later opened on Broadway in August 2018. After performing as Edward in the Chicago production, Kazee left Pretty Woman: The Musical due to "family reasons." He was replaced by Andy Karl when the production transferred to Broadway.

=== Television ===
In 2006, Kazee played Dumas Shepherd in an episode of the television series Conviction. In 2007, he appeared as Michael Barlow in Medium and Mark Green in Numb3rs. In 2008, he appeared on NCIS as Michael Locke. In 2009, he played Dominic Humphreys on CSI: Crime Scene Investigation. Kazee had a starring role on the CMT's Working Class (2011), in which he played Nick Garrett.

In 2013 he appeared on Elementary as Jeff Hines and on Drop Dead Diva as Dustin Wycott. In 2015, he played Gus Pfender in a recurring role in season 5 and 6 of Showtime's series Shameless.

== Personal life ==
Kazee was previously in a relationship with actress Megan Hilty from 2005 until 2012.

In October 2018, it was confirmed that Kazee was in a relationship with Jenna Dewan. In September 2019, it was announced that the couple were expecting their first child together. In February 2020, he and Dewan became engaged. He and Dewan had their son on March 6, 2020. In January 2024, it was announced that the couple were expecting their second child together. He and Dewan had their daughter on June 14, 2024.

== Theatre credits ==
Sources: Playbill; BroadwayWorld

| Year | Title | Role | Theatre | Notes |
|---|---|---|---|---|
| 2004 | Cabaret & Main | Performer | Williamstown Theatre Festival | Regional production |
| 2004 | Eurydice | Father | Williamstown Theatre Festival | Regional production |
| 2005 | As You Like It | Ensemble | Delacorte Theater | Shakespeare in the Park |
| 2005–2006 | Seascape | Leslie (u/s) | Booth Theatre | Broadway revival |
| 2006 | The Subject Was Roses | Timmy Cleary | Kennedy Center | Washington, D.C. revival |
| 2006 | Monty Python's Spamalot | Sir Lancelot (and others) | Shubert Theatre | Broadway replacement |
| 2007 | 110 in the Shade | Bill Starbuck | Studio 54 | Broadway revival |
| 2008 | To Be or Not to Be | Sobinsky | Samuel J. Friedman Theatre | Original Broadway production |
| 2009 | Pirates! (Or, Gilbert and Sullivan Plunder'd) | The Pirate King | Huntington Theatre Company | Original Boston production |
| 2009 | Tales of the City | | Eugene O'Neil Theater | Staged readings |
| 2011–2013 | Once | Guy | New York Theatre Workshop | Original off-Broadway production |
| 2011–2013 | Once | Guy | Bernard B. Jacobs Theatre | Original Broadway production |
| 2018 | Pretty Woman: The Musical | Edward | Oriental Theatre | Original Chicago production |
| 2018 | Love Actually Live | Jaime | The Wallis | Original production |

== Filmography ==
=== Television ===
| Year | Title | Role | Notes |
|---|---|---|---|
| 2011 | Working Class | Nick Garrett | Main role |
| 2013 | Elementary | Jeff Hines | Episode: "We Are Everyone" |
| 2013 | Drop Dead Diva | Dustin Wycott | Episode: "Guess Who's Coming" |
| 2015–2016 | Shameless | Gus Pfender | 14 episodes |
| 2016 | Nashville | Riff Bell | 2 episodes |
| 2016 | Drew | Ned Nickerson | Unsold TV pilot (CBS) |
| 2018 | Blindspot | Clem | 2 episodes |
| 2019 | The Walking Dead | Frank | Episode: "Omega" |
| 2019 | Tempting Fate | Elliott Cartwright | TV movie |
| 2021-2025 | The Rookie | Jason Wyler | 5 episodes |

== Awards and nominations ==
Sources: Playbill; IBDB

| Year | Award | Category | Work | Result |
|---|---|---|---|---|
| 2007 | Helen Hayes Award | Outstanding Lead Actor, Non-Resident Production | The Subject Was Roses | Nominated |
| 2012 | Tony Award | Best Performance by a Leading Actor in a Musical | Once | Won |
| 2012 | Drama League Award | Distinguished Performance | Once | Nominated |
| 2012 | Outer Critics Circle Award | Outstanding Actor in a Musical | Once | Nominated |
| 2013 | Grammy Award | Best Musical Theater Album (shared with Cristin Milioti, Steven Epstein, Martin Lowe, Glen Hansard, and Markéta Irglová) | Once | Won |
