= Shameless season 8 =

Shameless
- Season 8
- DVD cover
- Showrunner: John Wells
- Starring: William H. Macy; Emmy Rossum; Jeremy Allen White; Ethan Cutkosky; Shanola Hampton; Steve Howey; Emma Kenney; Cameron Monaghan; Isidora Goreshter
- No. of episodes: 12

Release
- Original network: Showtime
- Original release: November 5, 2017 – January 28, 2018

Season chronology
- ← Previous; Season 7 Next → Season 9

The eighth season of Shameless, an American comedy-drama television series based on the British series of the same name by Paul Abbott, was announced on December 19, 2016, a day after the seventh season finale. The season, which premiered on November 5, 2017, consisted of a total of 12 episodes.

This is also the last season to feature Isidora Goreshter as series regular, as she announced her departure from the series following the season finale.

== Plot ==
Fiona begins her new role as landlord of a local apartment building; she gets to know several of the apartment tenants, including Nessa (Jessica Szohr), a lesbian resident, while regularly facing problems within the neighborhood. Nessa introduces Fiona to Ford (Richard Flood), a mysterious Irish carpenter with a colorful past. Fiona bonds with Ford, who helps Fiona deal with a family of apartment squatters trying to sue her. The two eventually begin a sexual relationship. At the end of the season, Fiona confronts Ford about the state of their relationship; Ford reveals that he's happy in their relationship, but that he'll never be "madly in love" with her or anyone.

Ian has begun regularly helping teens at Trevor's youth center, and he and Trevor plan to convert an abandoned church building in Fiona's neighborhood into a homeless shelter. However, Fiona—wanting to raise the profile of the neighborhood—wants to convert the empty church building into an art gallery. The argument over the church building results in an ongoing feud between the two siblings. Fiona ultimately gets one of her connections to lease a new property to Ian and Trevor.

Lip continues to work at Brad's motorcycle shop, though he is forced to find a new sponsor when Brad, stressed from the birth of Cami's new baby, relapses. Lip briefly begins a casual relationship with his female co-worker, Eddie (Levy Tran), but is turned off by her rough nature. Meanwhile, Professor Youens gets charged with his fifth DUI, and he is sentenced to prison after appearing in court under the influence. Youens later dies in prison from a seizure; at the memorial service, Lip is dispirited upon discovering he was not the only student to have had a mentoring relationship with the professor. Sierra has rekindled with Charlie, who reveals to Lip that he had knocked up another girl during his separation with Sierra. Lip urges Charlie to tell Sierra the truth, but this backfires when Sierra angrily dumps Charlie over the secret baby. Initially finding comfort in Lip, Sierra breaks up with him when he encourages her to give Charlie a second chance.

Following his breakup with Sierra, Lip discovers Eddie's young niece, Xan, sitting alone in the motorcycle shop; Brad reveals that Eddie had abandoned Xan, who is estranged from her parents, at the shop. Upon discovering that Eddie had planned for Xan to be picked up by Social Services, Lip takes in Xan and invites her into the Gallagher home.

Elsewhere, Frank works towards becoming a reformed man following Monica's death. He successful lands a job at a local store, but quickly regresses to his old ways when the store is shuttered by corporate. Carl begins dating Kassidi (Sammi Hanratty), who has separation anxiety. Kassidi pressures Carl into marrying her, and the two falsify documents at the courthouse to get married; however, Carl breaks up with her when she goes to obsessive measures to prevent him from attending military school. Debbie becomes a welder and reunites with a newly remerged Derek, who wants joint custody of Franny. Kevin and Veronica take back the Alibi from Svetlana, who agrees to partial ownership of the bar. Kevin and Veronica later help Svetlana marry a senile elderly sugar daddy, after which Svetlana moves out of Kevin and Veronica's house.

As the season progresses, Ian stops taking his medication and starts to spiral; he initiates a protest against a homophobic pastor preaching gay conversion. When the protest goes viral online, Ian gains numerous supporters who agree with his message. Reeling from his newfound popularity, Ian is nicknamed "Gay Jesus" by his followers, while Frank takes advantage of the Gay Jesus movement to make a profit. Near the end of the season, Ian provides sanctuary to a runaway teen whose father is trying to harm him for being gay. Ian gets into a confrontation with the teen's father; the confrontation concludes with Ian, in a grand gesture, exploding the father's vehicle. The incident results in a warrant being placed for Ian's arrest. A concerned Trevor consults with Fiona over the warrant, while Ian begins a protest at a community college. The police quickly arrive to the protest and arrest Ian; the family witnesses Ian's arrest via television.

== Cast and characters ==
=== Main ===
- William H. Macy as Frank Gallagher
- Emmy Rossum as Fiona Gallagher
- Jeremy Allen White as Philip "Lip" Gallagher
- Ethan Cutkosky as Carl Gallagher
- Shanola Hampton as Veronica "V" Fisher
- Steve Howey as Kevin "Kev" Ball
- Emma Kenney as Debbie Gallagher
- Cameron Monaghan as Ian Gallagher
- Isidora Goreshter as Svetlana Yevgenivna Milkovich

=== Special guests ===
- Dermot Mulroney as Sean Pierce
- Richard Flood as Ford Kellogg

=== Recurring ===
- Christian Isaiah as Liam Gallagher
- Scott Michael Campbell as Brad
- Elliot Fletcher as Trevor
- Ruby Modine as Sierra Morton
- Alan Rosenberg as Professor Youens
- Jessica Szohr as Nessa Chabon
- Perry Mattfeld as Mel
- Levy Tran as Eddie
- Zack Pearlman as Neil
- Alicia Coppola as Sue
- Chet Hanks as Charlie
- Michael Patrick McGill as Tommy
- Jim Hoffmaster as Kermit
- Jennifer Taylor as Anne Seery
- David Brackett as Duran
- Peter Banifaz as Farhad
- Cooper J. Friedman as Lucas
- Juliette Angelo as Geneva
- Laura Cerón as Celia Delgado
- Sharon Lawrence as Margo Mierzejewski
- Melissa Paladino as Cami Tamietti
- Sammi Hanratty as Kassidi Gallagher
- Stacey Oristano as Trina
- Michael Gambino as Rodney
- Billy 'Sly' Williams as Linc
- Scarlet Spencer as Alexandra "Xan" Galvez
- Becca Blackwell as Father Murphy

=== Guests ===
- Faran Tahir as Mr. Adeeb
- Lea DeLaria as Barb
- Fiona Dourif as Tabitha Youens

== Episodes ==
No. overall	No. in season	Title	Directed by	Written by	Original release date	U.S. viewers (millions)
85	1	"We Become What We... Frank!"	Iain B. MacDonald	John Wells	November 5, 2017	1.86
Fiona begins renovating and renting out apartments in her new building, while bonding with one of the apartment tenants, Nessa. Following Monica's death, Frank has been living in a monastery. Returning home, Frank begins to apologize to everyone he has wronged in the past. Lip tries to get his drinking problem under control while also trying to win back Sierra, who has gotten back together with Charlie. Brad advises Lip to not pursue Sierra just yet. Debbie gets a new job and begins attending night school. Ian tries to win back Trevor by helping teens at the youth center. Carl begins selling the inherited meth that Monica left him and his siblings before she died. Liam is used by the faculty of his school to show off the school's diversity for prospective parents. Veronica tries to take back the Alibi from Svetlana by leading an ICE raid on the bar, in which Svetlana is detained. Kevin goes to an oncologist after finding a lump on his chest.
86	2	"Where's My Meth?"	Anthony Hemingway	Nancy M. Pimental	November 12, 2017	1.37
At her apartment building, Fiona deals with unpaid rent from a number of unruly tenants; Fiona ultimately gives a particular tenant an eviction notice. Frank finds a job for the first time and tries to be a respectable citizen. As Sierra's relationship with Charlie continues to build, Lip attempts to sabotage the relationship by tempting Charlie with a pizza topped with a baggie of coke. Charlie does not take the drugs, and instead decides to attend an AA meeting. Debbie begins to neglect Neil, who notices a hickey on her neck. Ian goes with Trevor to a chub bar in an effort to fix their relationship. Ian unexpectedly has a breakdown over Monica's death. Liam visits a rich friend's house and is astonished by the luxury that others have. Kevin attends a cancer support group before discovering his tumor is benign. After selling Ian's portion of Monica's meth, Carl is hunted down by Monica's drug-dealing ex-boyfriend, Eric, who owned some of the meth.
87	3	"God Bless Her Rotting Soul"	Michael Morris	Krista Vernoff	November 19, 2017	1.34
The Gallaghers deal with Eric, who threatens the family if he doesn't receive the drugs or $70,000 within 24 hours. Unable to raise enough money, the Gallaghers decide to dig up Monica's body to retrieve the meth, which Fiona had stored in her coffin. Frank, now going by Francis, remains committed to becoming a better person. Following his cancer scare, Kevin becomes obsessed with being healthy and, upon researching his genetics, finds out that he comes from an inbred community in Kentucky. Kevin decides to reconnect with his family. Fiona's evicted tenant destroys her room. Fiona attempts to find a new renter, but ends up coming into conflict with Nessa's girlfriend, Mel, who scares away potential tenants. Neil breaks up with Debbie for another woman. Svetlana tries to sell the Alibi, forcing Veronica to visit her in prison and make a deal; Svetlana is ultimately released with partial-ownership of the bar. Lip pays Professor Youens back for rehab; Youens uses the money for alcohol. While driving under the influence, Youens crashes into an old woman's home, landing him in jail on a DUI charge.
88	4	"Fuck Paying It Forward"	Regina King	Dominique Morisseau	November 26, 2017	1.59
Now reformed, Frank is helping as much as he can at home, and decides to be more fatherly towards Liam. Frank joins the PTA at Liam's school and grabs the attention of the other moms. Another black child join Liam's school. Brad advises Lip to pursue a no-strings relationship; Lip experiments with online dating, and later has sex with his female co-worker, Eddie. Debbie moves back into the Gallagher home. Franny takes her first steps. Ian lets a shelter girl of Trevor's sleep at the Gallagher house to help her out of a bad spot. Trevor confronts Ian, finding his actions inappropriate; Ian promises to find a living situation for the shelter kids. Carl attempts to catch a junkie breaking into houses on the block, after learning the thief stole a disabled veteran's medals. Kevin and Veronica meet Kevin's biological family; Kevin is overwrought with emotion, whereas Veronica fears his family is racist. Fiona is furious when Sean, now clean and married, returns. Fiona initially believes Sean wants to get back together. When Sean reveals that he is married and merely wants to make amends, Fiona throws him out.
89	5	"The (Mis)Education of Liam Fergus Beircheart Gallagher"	Iain B. MacDonald	Sheila Callaghan	December 3, 2017	1.51
Wanting to raise the profile of the neighborhood, Fiona plans to convert an abandoned church into an art gallery, unaware that Ian and Trevor are raising money to convert the same property into a youth shelter. The battle over the property causes a fallout between Fiona and Ian. Carl loses his military school scholarship, and looks for ways to raise money himself to pay for the next semester. Carl has also locked up the junkie thief in the Gallagher basement for detoxing. Exhausted from the stress of parenting his newborn baby, Brad relapses; Brad informs Lip to find another sponsor. Frank teaches parents in Liam's school about the working class, inadvertently arousing a couple of the moms. Kevin, Veronica and Svetlana disagree over how to split the bar's earnings. In an attempt to get half of the earnings, Svetlana seduces Veronica. Debbie discovers that Derek has returned, and is now spending time with Franny. Enraged by Derek's return, Debbie and her friend, Duran, go on a drug-fuelled road trip.
90	6	"Icarus Fell and Rusty Ate Him"	Zetna Fuentes	Mark Steilen	December 10, 2017	1.52
During their road trip, Debbie has unprotected sex with Duran. Unable to buy a morning-after pill because she is underage, Debbie asks another woman to buy the pill for her. When the woman tries to run off with the money, Debbie assaults her, resulting in Debbie's arrest. After she discovers one of her tenants dead, Fiona reflects on her own life, and decides to take in tenants' dog. Fiona and Ian are unable to compromise. Following the success of the junkie's detox, Carl begins a rehab business in the Gallagher basement. Kevin, Veronica and Svetlana have reinstated their sexual relationship. Kevin ponders his sexuality, while Veronica ponders over why she can't resist Svetlana's advances; Veronica realizes she likes to be sexually dominated. Brad is kicked out by his wife, Cami, until he can become sober. When Brad goes missing, Lip, Eddie, and Youens attempt to relocate him. Frank enjoys having his first-ever credit card, only to later learn his store is being closed by corporate.
91	7	"Occupy Fiona"	Iain B. MacDonald	Molly Smith Metzler	December 17, 2017	1.58
Ian tests Fiona's patience by organizing the shelter kids and beginning an "Occupy Fiona" movement next to her apartment building. Fiona gives Ian and Trevor another potential location for a shelter, but Ian remains uninterested. Worried that Ian is growing impulsive, Trevor signs the lease for the other location. Fiona meets Ford, an Irish carpenter hired by Nessa. Frank goes on a job hunt but his interviews are unsuccessful. After speaking with an illegal immigrant, Frank is inspired to begin an import-export business through the US-Canada border. Carl gets close to Kassidi, one of his rehab clients, who suggests he pretend to hold her ransom, in order to raise enough money for military school. Kevin learns how to sexually dominate Veronica. With the support of Brad, Lip tries to help Youens for his DUI trial—his fifth drunk driving conviction. The trial quickly falls awry when it is obvious that Youens is under the influence, resulting in Youens getting sentenced to prison.
92	8	"Frank's Northern Southern Express"	Emmy Rossum	Nancy M. Pimental	December 31, 2017	0.81
Fiona considers moving into one of her apartments, while she tries to get closer to Ford. Ford rebuffs her, believing that Fiona is "complicated." Nessa and Mel throw a party to celebrate both of their pregnancies; Fiona discovers that Ford had voluntarily fathered both of their babies. Frank begins his import-export business. Lip interviews new AA sponsors. Charlie reveals to Lip that, while he and Sierra were separated, he knocked up another girl; Lip insists that Charlie amend the situation and tell Sierra about the secret baby. Meanwhile, Sierra reveals that her murderous father is up for parole. At the new youth center, Ian and Trevor meet a suicidal teen who has been forced to a visit a gay conversion church; Ian visits the church and confronts the pastor. Carl and Kassidi continue a relationship. Kevin starts showing his dominating tricks against Svetlana at work, which pleases Veronica. While trying to find a new job, Debbie also thinks she may be pregnant again.
93	9	"The Fugees"	Jeffrey Reiner	Dominique Morisseau	January 7, 2018	1.65
Ian's run-in with the homophobic minister goes viral on the internet, grabbing the attention of local religious leaders, who support Ian's message. Frank's business takes a turn for the worse when he is arrested by a group of mounties; Frank manages to escape when their car crashes, leaving the mounties unconscious. Fiona tries and fails to fit in with Ford's group of friends. Fiona and Ford share a kiss. Rodney, a construction worker hired by Fiona, falls off the roof of the apartment building. Svetlana receives a visit from her former friend, Freelania, who reveals that she is getting married. Upset over Freelania's visit, Svetlana reveals to Kevin and Veronica how bad she feels about her current miserable life. Needing money to pay for her welding class, Debbie uses a drug dog to steal drugs from the cars of local dealers. Sierra finds out about Charlie's secret baby and angrily leaves him. Lip tells Sierra to take Charlie back, but the two end up having sex instead. Kassidi, suffering from separation anxiety, attempts to prevent Carl from attending military school. When Carl buys Kassidi a promise ring, she mistakes it for an engagement ring.
94	10	"Church of Gay Jesus"	Anna Mastro	Sheila Callaghan	January 14, 2018	1.52
Ian tries to get a handle on his newfound fame and attention from his followers, while Frank finds a way to cash in on Ian's success, selling Church of Gay Jesus merchandise to the public. Fiona and Ford begin a sexual relationship. Fiona finds out that Rodney's family is now homeless; Fiona shows remorse by letting them stay in a vacant apartment. Later, Nessa informs Fiona that Rodney's family is suing Fiona for $6 million. Feeling bad for Svetlana, Kevin and Veronica decide to help Svetlana find a sugar daddy. Lip tries to visit Youens in prison, but is shocked to discover that Youens had recently died of a seizure. Grappling over Youen's death, Lip attends the memorial service, but is disheartened to learn he was not the only student to have had a close relationship with Youens; Lip crumples his eulogy and abruptly leaves the ceremony. Lip comforts Youen's daughter. Debbie gets a welding gig and is injured when a pipe falls on her toe. Kassidi fakes a suicide hanging to pressure Carl into an impromptu wedding; Carl reluctantly agrees to get married.
95	11	"A Gallagher Pedicure"	Iain B. MacDonald	Mark Steilen	January 21, 2018	1.52
Following the lawsuit, Rodney's family barricade themselves inside the apartment and change the locks, enraging Fiona. When the family refuses to negotiate, Fiona tries to annoy the squatters into leaving. Sierra is terrified when her father gets released from jail; Sierra believes her father intends to kill her and Neil, as they had testified against him. Lip manipulates a fight with Sierra's father and reports the "assault" to the police, causing Sierra's father to get sent back to prison. Following her injury, Debbie decides to amputate her toes, as she cannot pay for surgery. When Debbie cannot bring herself to do it, Frank ends up cutting the three crushed toes for her. Unable to get a sugar daddy, Svetlana meets Freelania's elderly sugar daddy, who mistakes Svetlana for his fiancé. Svetlana later kidnaps Freelania. Despite warnings from Trevor, Ian provides sanctuary to a runaway teen, Blake, who claims his father is trying to harm him for being gay. A confrontation between Ian and Blake's father ends with Ian and his assistant exploding the father's vehicle.
96	12	"Sleepwalking"	John Wells	John Wells	January 28, 2018	1.73
Trevor informs Fiona that there is a warrant for Ian's arrest. Fiona questions Ford about their relationship; Ford admits that he's happy. With the help of Ford, Fiona negotiates a final offer with Rodney's family and gets them to drop the lawsuit. Frank enrolls Liam in planning a burglary at his rich friend's house. Liam initially participates, but suddenly abandons Frank in the middle of the heist. Derek reveals to Debbie that he wants joint custody of Franny. Kassidi attempts to keep Carl from military school by handcuffing him in his room. While Kassidi is sleeping, Liam unlocks Carl's handcuffs; Carl is able to escape and board the bus for military school. Kevin and Veronica help Svetlana go through with her scheme—posing as Freelania at the wedding. Kevin walks Svetlana down the aisle at the wedding, which is ultimately successful. Sierra finds comfort in Lip after an argument with Charlie. However, Lip urges Sierra to give Charlie a second chance; Sierra angrily walks out on Lip. Eddie runs away and abandons her niece, Xan, at the bike shop. Lip invites Xan into the Gallagher home. During a protest, Ian is arrested by the police; the Gallagher family discover Ian's arrest via television.

== Ratings ==
Viewership and ratings per episode of Shameless season 8
No.	Title	Air date	Rating (18–49)	Viewers (millions)	DVR (18–49)	DVR viewers (millions)	Total (18–49)	Total viewers (millions)
1	"We Become What We ... Frank!"	November 5, 2017	0.7	1.86	0.5	1.16	1.2	3.02
2	"Where's My Meth?"	November 12, 2017	0.5	1.37	—N/a	—N/a	—N/a	—N/a
3	"God Bless Her Rotting Soul"	November 19, 2017	0.5	1.34	—N/a	—N/a	—N/a	—N/a
4	"Fuck Paying It Forward"	November 26, 2017	0.6	1.59	0.6	1.26	1.2	2.86
5	"The (Mis)Education of Liam Fergus Beircheart; Gallagher"	December 3, 2017	0.6	1.51	0.5	1.42	1.1	2.93
6	"Icarus Fell And Rusty Ate Him"	December 10, 2017	0.5	1.52	0.6	1.40	1.1	2.92
7	"Occupy Fiona"	December 17, 2017	0.5	1.58	—N/a	—N/a	—N/a	—N/a
8	"Frank's Northern Southern Express"	December 31, 2017	0.2	0.81	—N/a	—N/a	—N/a	—N/a
9	"The Fugees"	January 7, 2018	0.7	1.65	—N/a	—N/a	—N/a	—N/a
10	"Church of Gay Jesus"	January 14, 2018	0.6	1.52	0.5	1.37	1.1	2.90
11	"A Gallagher Pedicure"	January 21, 2018	0.5	1.52	0.6	1.38	1.1	2.89
12	"Sleepwalking"	January 28, 2018	0.6	1.73	0.5	1.27	1.1	3.00
