= Frank's Northern Southern Express =

- Shameless episode
- Episode no.: Season 8 Episode 8
- Directed by: Emmy Rossum
- Written by: Nancy M. Pimental
- Cinematography by: Kevin McKnight
- Editing by: Mark Strand
- Original release date: December 31, 2017
- Running time: 55 minutes

Guest appearances
- Richard Flood as Ford Kellogg (special guest star); Omid Abtahi as Sameer; Scott Michael Campbell as Brad; Jonathan Chase as Pastor Di Leo; Lea DeLaria as Barb; Elliot Fletcher as Trevor; Sammi Hanratty as Kassidi; Jack McGee as Sponsor; Ruby Modine as Sierra Morton; Jessica Szohr as Nessa Chabon; Juliette Angelo as Geneva; Jim Hoffmaster as Kermit; Aline Elasmar as Rania; Michael Patrick McGill as Tommy; Parisa Fakhri as Fatemeh; Chet Hanks as Charlie; Perry Mattfeld as Mel

Episode chronology
← Previous "Occupy Fiona"	Next → "The Fugees"
- Shameless season 8

"Frank's Northern Southern Express" is the eighth episode of the eighth season of the American television comedy drama Shameless, an adaptation of the British series of the same name. It is the 92nd overall episode of the series and was written by executive producer Nancy M. Pimental, and directed by main cast member Emmy Rossum. It originally aired on Showtime on December 31, 2017.

The series is set on the South Side of Chicago, Illinois, and depicts the poor, dysfunctional family of Frank Gallagher, a neglectful single father of six: Fiona, Phillip, Ian, Debbie, Carl, and Liam. He spends his days drunk, high, or in search of money, while his children need to learn to take care of themselves. In the episode, Fiona considers moving out, while Frank helps people in crossing the Canadian border.

According to Nielsen Media Research, the episode was seen by an estimated 0.81 million household viewers and gained a 0.23 ratings share among adults aged 18–49. The episode received mixed reviews; while critics praised Fiona's and Lip's storylines, the rest of the subplots received criticism.

== Plot ==
After finding Brad (Scott Michael Campbell) sleeping in the shower, Fiona (Emmy Rossum) considers moving out of the house. She discusses it with Nessa (Jessica Szohr), and she suggests she could use a vacant apartment in her tenement building.

While cleaning the new youth center, Ian (Cameron Monaghan) and Trevor (Elliot Fletcher) learn that one of the kids, Jamie, tried to commit suicide after his parents forced him to visit a gay conversion church. Ian takes a Bible and goes to the church to scold the priest, and his speech convinces some of the attendees to leave with him. While accompanying Debbie (Emma Kenney) to Planned Parenthood, Lip (Jeremy Allen White) sees Charlie (Chet Hanks) got a girl pregnant. He says he will not tell Sierra (Ruby Modine), but Charlie must explain himself soon. Fiona checks the recently deceased woman's vacant apartment, and uses it to take a shower. She is interrupted by Ford (Richard Flood), who was looking for his tools. As he shows her his work, Fiona flirts with him, but Ford is clearly not interested in her, as he believes she is "complicated."

Frank (William H. Macy) begins running his import-export business, planning to take a few people into Canada. To avoid authorities, they must venture into the woods to cross the border. Along the journey, a woman briefly passes out, but Frank manages to complete the journey to meet with his contact. While looking for a new sponsor, Lip finds Sierra crying outside Patsy's. She reveals that her father killed her mother and could be up for parole. Charlie shows up to pick her for the hearing, and Lip reminds him about their previous talk. Carl (Ethan Cutkosky) continues stealing customers from Uber, accompanied by Kassidi (Sammi Hanratty). However, Kassidi often scares Carl's clients by insulting them.

Kevin (Steve Howey) becomes more strict in his daily life after finally knowing how to sexually dominate Veronica (Shanola Hampton). This includes finally standing up to Svetlana (Isidora Goreshter), concerning her. Nessa and Mel (Perry Mattfeld) throw a party to celebrate both of their pregnancies; Fiona discovers that Ford had voluntarily fathered both of their babies, and is not the first time he does it. After returning, Frank sells the car to buy a new van, planning to use it for his business venture.

== Production ==
=== Development ===
The episode was written by executive producer Nancy M. Pimental, and directed by main cast member Emmy Rossum. It was Pimental's 19th writing credit, and Rossum's second directing credit.

== Reception ==
=== Viewers ===
In its original American broadcast, "Frank's Northern Southern Express" was seen by an estimated 0.81 million household viewers with a 0.23 in the 18–49 demographics. This means that 0.23 percent of all households with televisions watched the episode. This was a 49% decrease in viewership from the previous episode, which was seen by an estimated 1.58 million household viewers with a 0.51 in the 18–49 demographics.

=== Critical reviews ===
"Frank's Northern Southern Express" received mixed reviews. Myles McNutt of The A.V. Club gave the episode a "C" grade and wrote, "“Frank's Northern Southern Express” does nothing to keep the season off its downward slide, even if it's an improvement on last week's low point. It once again finds its most dynamic material in Fiona and Lip's ongoing stories, but fails to build anything significant outside of those two characters."

Derek Lawrence of Entertainment Weekly wrote "Emmy Rossum, Fiona herself, directed “Frank's Northern Southern Express,” which serves as her second time behind the camera on the series and one of the season's best installments."

David Crow of Den of Geek gave the episode a 3 star rating out of 5 and wrote "Ms. Rossum did a fine job directing it, and all the cast was very game, but even though this was scripted over half a year ago, it very much feels like the writers' room was already off for the holidays. Here's to hoping their efforts are more refreshed in the New Year." Paul Dailly of TV Fanatic gave the episode a 4 star rating out of 5, and wrote, ""Frank's Northern Southern Express" was a solid episode that successfully changed things up for some of the characters proving that the show still has a lot of steam left."
