= The (Mis)Education of Liam Fergus Beircheart Gallagher =

- Shameless episode
- Episode no.: Season 8 Episode 5
- Directed by: Iain B. MacDonald
- Written by: Sheila Callaghan
- Cinematography by: Kevin McKnight
- Editing by: Mark Strand
- Original release date: December 3, 2017
- Running time: 58 minutes

Guest appearances
- Sharon Lawrence as Margo Mierzejewski; Scott Michael Campbell as Brad; Paul Cassell as Quinton Fleet; Laura Cerón as Celia Delgado; Elliot Fletcher as Trevor; Ruby Modine as Sierra Morton; Jessica Szohr as Nessa Chabon; Juliette Angelo as Geneva; Jim Hoffmaster as Kermit; Keston John as Josué Toussaint; Shane Paul McGhie as Jude Toussaint; Michael Patrick McGill as Tommy; Ashley Wood as Beverly Martini; Perry Mattfeld as Mel; Jennifer Taylor as Anne Seery; Levy Tran as Eddie

Episode chronology
← Previous "Fuck Paying It Forward"	Next → "Icarus Fell and Rusty Ate Him"
- Shameless season 8

"The (Mis)Education of Liam Fergus Beircheart Gallagher" is the fifth episode of the eighth season of the American television comedy drama Shameless, an adaptation of the British series of the same name. It is the 89th overall episode of the series and was written by executive producer Sheila Callaghan and directed by supervising producer Iain B. MacDonald. It originally aired on Showtime on December 3, 2017.

The series is set on the South Side of Chicago, Illinois, and depicts the poor, dysfunctional family of Frank Gallagher, a neglectful single father of six: Fiona, Phillip, Ian, Debbie, Carl, and Liam. He spends his days drunk, high, or in search of money, while his children need to learn to take care of themselves. In the episode, Fiona and Ian separately look to buy a dilapidated church, while Kevin and Veronica find that Svetlana is earning more money than them.

According to Nielsen Media Research, the episode was seen by an estimated 1.51 million household viewers and gained a 0.57 ratings share among adults aged 18–49. The episode received critical acclaim, who praised the new storyline with Fiona and Ian.

== Plot ==
Carl (Ethan Cutkosky) has kept the thief chained at his basement, where he is detoxing. During this, he discovers that he lost his military scholarship to another boy, and he needs over $10,000 if he wants to secure his spot in the academy. Despite taking a job at Patsy's, he realizes he will not be able to get the money before the deadline.

Frank (William H. Macy) has received another promotion at his job, and continues taking Liam to his classes. Liam gets an F on a test, but Frank defends his writing in front of the teacher. He also begins attracting some of the mothers at school, with one of them having sex with him at his warehouse. Ian (Cameron Monaghan) and Trevor (Elliot Fletcher) become interested in buying a dilapidated church, planning to use it to house some kids in the youth center. During this, Fiona (Emmy Rossum) also sets her sights on the church, as she wants to make an art gallery to improve the recreational activities at the neighborhood.

Kevin (Steve Howey), Veronica (Shanola Hampton) and Svetlana (Isidora Goreshter) have been taking different shifts at the Alibi. However, Kevin and Veronica note that Svetlana takes half of the salary, while the rest has to be divided by Kevin and Veronica. Svetlana defends her stance, as she works harder and earns thrice the money during her shift. Veronica confronts Svetlana, asking her to stop selling drugs in the establishment. She agrees, but only if Veronica has sex with her. Lip (Jeremy Allen White) visits Brad (Scott Michael Campbell) at his house, who just had a baby with his wife. Brad tells him he needs a new sponsor, as he will be busy with the baby. He finds him at a bar, having relapsed. As he tries to help him come home, Brad brutally beats him.

While picking Franny from the Delgados, Debbie (Emma Kenney) is shocked when Derek (Luca Oriel) re-appears. Debbie refuses to let him be involved in Franny's life, and later goes on a drug-fuelled road trip with her friend, Duran (David Brackett). Carl starts working as a driver by stealing Uber's customers, and also decides to release the thief. The thief later returns, thanking Carl for detoxing him, and pays him $7,500 for his service. Ian approaches the owners of the church, only to discover that they are meeting with Fiona to complete the sale. Fiona and Ian have an argument, with Fiona refusing to abandon the sale. Kevin returns home, and is shocked to find that Svetlana got half the profits after Veronica agreed to have sex with her.

== Production ==
=== Development ===
The episode was written by executive producer Sheila Callaghan and directed by supervising producer Iain B. MacDonald. It was Callaghan's 11th writing credit, and MacDonald's fifth directing credit.

== Reception ==
=== Viewers ===
In its original American broadcast, "The (Mis)Education of Liam Fergus Beircheart Gallagher" was seen by an estimated 1.51 million household viewers with a 0.57 in the 18–49 demographics. This means that 0.57 percent of all households with televisions watched the episode. This was a 6 percent decrease in viewership from the previous episode, which was seen by an estimated 1.59 million household viewers with a 0.61 in the 18–49 demographics.

=== Critical reviews ===
"The (Mis)Education of Liam Fergus Beircheart Gallagher" received critical acclaim. Myles McNutt of The A.V. Club gave the episode an "A–" grade and wrote, "I doubt that the conflict between Fiona and Ian will have the same devastating effects as what happened to those who have helped Lip on his journey to sobriety, but it's the conflict the season was waiting for, and sets things up for a philosophically dynamic story thread for the rest of the season."

Derek Lawrence of Entertainment Weekly wrote "Is it me, or have the Gallaghers been too well behaved this season? I know that might seem crazy to say considering Lip sent a cocaine pizza to a recovering addict and V tried to have Svetlana deported, but that's amateur hour compared to the past seven seasons. And yes, while it's good that this family is growing up and maturing, I miss the days of Frank stealing prosthetic legs and Carl strapping drugs to little Uncle Chuckie."

David Crow of Den of Geek gave the episode a 4 star rating out of 5 and wrote "It was all reliably entertaining Shameless shenanigans. But the impending war between Fiona and Ian, and what it represents for such communities as Fi's neighborhood, is what put tonight's episode over the top. The gentrification battle lines have been long drawn, but tonight featured the first real shots of it being fired in the Gallagher household, and as it turns out, Fiona switched sides before pulling the trigger." Paul Dailly of TV Fanatic gave the episode a perfect 5 star rating out of 5, and wrote, ""The Education of Liam Fergus Beircheart Gallagher" was another stellar episode of this Showtime hit. This show is (still!) showing no sign of slowing down."
