= We Become What We... Frank! =

- Shameless episode
- Episode no.: Season 8 Episode 1
- Directed by: Iain B. MacDonald
- Written by: John Wells
- Cinematography by: Kevin McKnight
- Editing by: Mark Strand
- Original release date: November 5, 2017
- Running time: 55 minutes

Guest appearances
- Scott Michael Campbell as Brad; Alicia Coppola as Sue; Elliot Fletcher as Trevor; Ruby Modine as Sierra Morton; Zack Pearlman as Neil; Alan Rosenberg as Professor Youens; Jessica Szohr as Nessa Chabon; Jim Hoffmaster as Kermit; Michael Patrick McGill as Tommy; Brad Beyer as ICE Squad Captain; Shea Buckner as Jason; Chet Hanks as Charlie; Jennifer Taylor as Anne Seery

Episode chronology
← Previous "Requiem for a Slut"	Next → "Where's My Meth?"
- Shameless season 8

"We Become What We... Frank!" is the first episode of the eighth season of the American television comedy drama Shameless, an adaptation of the British series of the same name. It is the 85th overall episode of the series and was written by series developer John Wells and directed by supervising producer Iain B. MacDonald. It originally aired on Showtime on November 5, 2017.

The series is set on the South Side of Chicago, Illinois, and depicts the poor, dysfunctional family of Frank Gallagher, a neglectful single father of six: Fiona, Phillip, Ian, Debbie, Carl, and Liam. He spends his days drunk, high, or in search of money, while his children need to learn to take care of themselves. In the episode, Frank returns from a monastery as a changed man, while Fiona sets out in finding profitability in her tenement building.

According to Nielsen Media Research, the episode was seen by an estimated 1.86 million household viewers and gained a 0.73 ratings share among adults aged 18–49, which was higher than any episode of the past season. The episode received highly positive reviews from critics, who praised the new dynamics and development for the characters.

== Plot ==
Fiona (Emmy Rossum) decides to abandon online dating, and dumps her date. She returns home, where Carl (Ethan Cutkosky) has been using his knowledge from military school to serve his family. He uses his share of Monica's inheritance to install a hot tub in the backyard.

Frank (William H. Macy) returns after having stayed at a monastery to mourn Monica's death. He claims he is a changed man, having consumed half of his meth bag and donating the other half. He apologizes to Carl for all the bad things he did and proceeds to go around town to seek forgiveness from other people. Fiona begins working at the tenement building, befriending one of the residents, Nessa (Jessica Szohr). Debbie (Emma Kenney) now works at a parking garage, while also taking night school classes. Ian (Cameron Monaghan) tries to repair his relationship with Trevor (Elliot Fletcher) by helping people at the youth center, but Trevor is not ready to go out with him. Liam (Christian Isaiah) is used by the faculty of his school to show off the school's diversity for prospective parents.

Veronica (Shanola Hampton) is forced to work at Patsy's, while Kevin (Steve Howey) continues working at the gay club, but Veronica specifically instructs him not to let anyone masturbate him despite the promise of payment. They are horrified to learn that Svetlana (Isidora Goreshter) disbanded the Alibi Room's name, and changed it to "Putin's Paradise", where customers can earn a discount if they speak Russian. After fighting with her, Veronica feels inspired by a raid that she contacts U.S. Immigration and Customs Enforcement to raid the bar, claiming they run illegal prostitutes. Svetlana and a few others are arrested, while Veronica proudly watches. That night, Kevin decides to let a man give him oral sex for $200. However, the man notices a lump in Kevin's breast, and tells him he should visit a doctor. At a clinic, Kevin is told that he will need to get a biopsy, alarming him.

Fiona initially believes she might not get to sell an apartment in the building, but is surprised when a family offers to pay even more than the offer. Lip (Jeremy Allen White) continues his friendship with Sierra (Ruby Modine), although Brad (Scott Michael Campbell) says he should not pursue a relationship with her until six months later. Nevertheless, he agrees in helping her babysit Lucas, despite her going on a date with Charlie (Chet Hanks). Afterwards, he visits Youens (Alan Rosenberg) and pays him his share of the meth money, thanking him for getting him help.

== Production ==
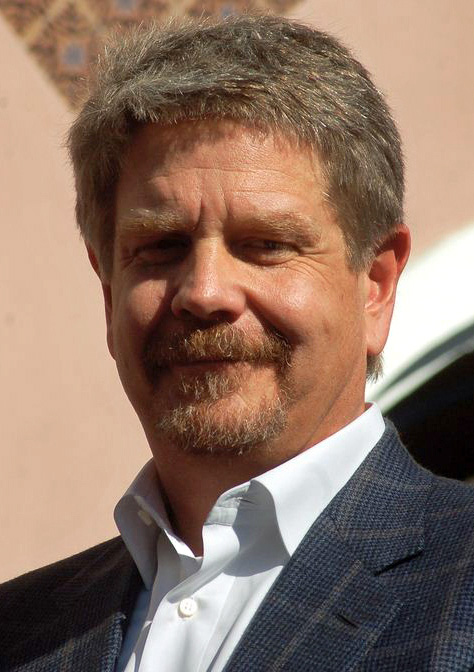
The episode was written by John Wells.

The episode was written by series developer John Wells and directed by supervising producer Iain B. MacDonald. It was Wells' 16th writing credit, and MacDonald's fourth directing credit.

== Reception ==
=== Viewers ===
In its original American broadcast, "We Become What We... Frank!" was seen by an estimated 1.86 million household viewers with a 0.73 in the 18–49 demographics. This means that 0.73 percent of all households with televisions watched the episode. This was a 8 percent increase in viewership from the previous episode, which was seen by an estimated 1.72 million household viewers with a 0.6 in the 18–49 demographics.

=== Critical reviews ===
"We Become What We... Frank!" received highly positive reviews from critics. Myles McNutt of The A.V. Club gave the episode a "B+" grade and wrote, "The weight facing each Gallagher isn't as immediate as it once was, with characters grappling less with the razor's edge of poverty and more with the psychological toil of having ridden that edge for so many years. But that leaves room for the show to dig deeper into who these characters are, and who they intend to be, questions that will be important to the show avoiding the pitfalls of some of Showtime's other shows that ran longer than they should have."

Derek Lawrence of Entertainment Weekly wrote "Craving a drink, Lip runs to his professor's house to give his mentor the rest of the meth money. “Thanks for the rehab,” he says before going back to running. He might not have a future with Sierra, but at this rate, he's got a chance to become the South Side's Usain Bolt."

David Crow of Den of Geek gave the episode a 3.5 star rating out of 5 and wrote "As a whole, Shameless season 8 began like how all other Shameless seasons do: by reintroducing us to the characters and having some laughs as we get caught up. What will drive them in the weeks to come and how will their lives become truly fucked up is a bit of a guessing game at the moment, but I'm happy to play along. Just as I'm happy to have these wonderfully endearing degenerates back on TV." Paul Dailly of TV Fanatic gave the episode a perfect 5 star rating out of 5, and wrote, ""We Become What We... Frank!" was an excellent return for the Gallagher clan. It successfully set the wheels in motion for what is sure to be another thrilling season of this Showtime drama series."
