= God Bless Her Rotting Soul =

- Shameless episode
- Episode no.: Season 8 Episode 3
- Directed by: Michael Morris
- Written by: Krista Vernoff
- Cinematography by: Kevin McKnight
- Editing by: Mark Strand
- Original release date: November 19, 2017
- Running time: 53 minutes

Guest appearances
- Scott Michael Campbell as Brad; Alicia Coppola as Sue; Jen Dede as Anne Crowley; Elliot Fletcher as Trevor; Jamie Harris as Eric; Zack Pearlman as Neil; Alan Rosenberg as Professor Youens; Jessica Szohr as Nessa Chabon; Raffi Barsoumian as Bahir; Jim Hoffmaster as Kermit; Perry Mattfeld as Mel

Episode chronology
← Previous "Where's My Meth?"	Next → "Fuck Paying It Forward"
- Shameless season 8

"God Bless Her Rotting Soul" is the third episode of the eighth season of the American television comedy drama Shameless, an adaptation of the British series of the same name. It is the 87th overall episode of the series and was written by executive producer Krista Vernoff and directed by Michael Morris. It originally aired on Showtime on November 19, 2017.

The series is set on the South Side of Chicago, Illinois, and depicts the poor, dysfunctional family of Frank Gallagher, a neglectful single father of six: Fiona, Phillip, Ian, Debbie, Carl, and Liam. He spends his days drunk, high, or in search of money, while his children need to learn to take care of themselves. In the episode, the Gallaghers are threatened by Monica's past, while Fiona tries to sell an apartment in the building.

According to Nielsen Media Research, the episode was seen by an estimated 1.34 million household viewers and gained a 0.47 ratings share among adults aged 18–49. The episode received highly positive reviews from critics, who praised the focus on the family working together.

== Plot ==
The Gallaghers debate on what to do in the situation with Eric (Jamie Harris), who wants Monica's meth back. Frank (William H. Macy), who now prefers to be called Francis, simply suggests staying outside the storage unit, and to not contact Eric ever again. The family decides to keep Fiona (Emmy Rossum) out of the situation.

As the evicted occupant destroyed her apartment, Fiona is forced to renovate it in an attempt to sell it. A man, Bahir (Raffi Barsoumian), agrees to buy it despite the state of the room. On his way out, he runs into Mel (Perry Mattfeld), who scares him into pulling out of the offer by claiming there are bed bugs in the building. She does this so that her friends can rent the apartment, but they are unwilling to pay Fiona's quota. Youens (Alan Rosenberg) uses the money that Lip (Jeremy Allen White) gave him to buy more alcohol. He falls back into abusing it, and ends up crashing his car into a house. Lip is forced to bail him out, and is shocked to discover that this was his fifth DUI incident.

Veronica (Shanola Hampton) begins to regret sending Svetlana (Isidora Goreshter) to prison after realizing that the debts at the Alibi are increasing. When a Russian realtor shows up to acquire the bar, Veronica decides to visit Svetlana in prison. They agree to share custody on the children and the bar, if Veronica can secure her release. During this, Kevin (Steve Howey) decides to take a genetic test as he fears his diagnosis could be passed to his children. The doctor tells Kevin that there is nothing wrong with him, but they have discovered something; he comes from a rare Huntsville subgroup, a community in Kentucky known for inbreeding. He initially refuses to call his family, but ends up contacting them, realizing that his birth name is actually Bart.

Debbie (Emma Kenney) returns home and discovers that Neil (Zack Pearlman) has fallen in love with his nurse Lakisha (Kelli Dawn Hancock). Realizing that Debbie is a bad person, he kicks her out. Eric appears at the Gallagher household and almost drowns Carl (Ethan Cutkosky). Ian (Cameron Monaghan) tries to stop him but is tackled by his henchmen. Eric warns them that he wants his seven pounds of meth or the $70,000 by tomorrow, or he will kill them. The family only has $9,000, so they are finally forced to ask Fiona for her help. Fiona takes pleasure in her family asking for her help, and agrees to help after forcing them to admit that she was right and they were wrong. Using Frank's employee discount, they get shovels and exhume Monica's gravestone to retrieve the meth bags.

The family meets with Eric in the storage unit. While they give him the bags and their money, Eric is still unsatisfied as they are $37,000 short. Frank interrupts him by saying that half the drugs belonged to Monica, and swiftly threatens him into letting his family walk away. Eric agrees, and this earns him Fiona's respect. Fiona later confronts Mel over trying to sabotage the sale; she threatens with planting real bed bugs and then evicting her unless she calls Bahir to confess her lie, and she agrees. Svetlana is officially released from prison. Lip, along with Brad (Scott Michael Campbell) and other co-workers, stages an intervention for Youens at his house.

== Production ==
=== Development ===
The episode was written by executive producer Krista Vernoff and directed by Michael Morris. It was Vernoff's eighth writing credit, and Morris' first directing credit.

== Reception ==
=== Viewers ===
In its original American broadcast, "God Bless Her Rotting Soul" was seen by an estimated 1.34 million household viewers with a 0.47 in the 18–49 demographics. This means that 0.47 percent of all households with televisions watched the episode. This was a slight decrease in viewership from the previous episode, which was seen by an estimated 1.37 million household viewers with a 0.52 in the 18–49 demographics.

=== Critical reviews ===
"God Bless Her Rotting Soul" received highly positive reviews from critics. Myles McNutt of The A.V. Club gave the episode a "B+" grade and wrote, "Thus far, Shameless' eighth season has been approaching this question of accountability from a range of perspectives, and the result has been a striking level of maturity from the show and its characters. For the first time, every Gallagher but Liam is old enough to understand the situation they've found themselves in with Monica’s meth head boyfriend reemerging looking for his meth, and Frank is even clear-headed enough to feel the emotional weight of the occasion. And so while they each made various mistakes, and Debbie really is a horrible person, the Gallaghers unite together with a realization that their futures depend on their ability to rise to this and other occasions like it."

Derek Lawrence of Entertainment Weekly wrote "Over seven-plus seasons, there aren't many terrible things that the Gallaghers haven't done. Stealing a baby: check. Helping an escaped convict flee the country: check. Using your younger uncle as a drug mule: check. Well, now we can add digging up your dead mom's grave to recover stolen meth to the list."

David Crow of Den of Geek gave the episode a perfect 5 star rating out of 5 and wrote "I am not sure how they can top this episode with still three-quarters of a season left, but for tonight it feels good to have that familiar buzz that comes around whenever we stop by the Alibi and friends." Paul Dailly of TV Fanatic gave the episode a 3.5 star rating out of 5, and wrote, ""God Bless Her Rotting Soul" was not my favorite episode of Shameless. It had its share of funny moments, but ending some of the plots that had the potential to run for several months is concerning."
