= Ride or Die (Shameless) =

- Shameless episode
- Episode no.: Season 7 Episode 10
- Directed by: Zetna Fuentes
- Written by: Dominique Morisseau
- Cinematography by: Loren Yaconelli
- Editing by: Brent McReynolds
- Original release date: December 4, 2016
- Running time: 55 minutes

Guest appearances
- Noel Fisher as Mickey Milkovich (special guest star); June Squibb as Etta (special guest star); Chloe Webb as Monica Gallagher (special guest star); Sasha Alexander as Helene Runyon (special guest star); Sharon Lawrence as Margo Mierzejewski; Alicia Coppola as Sue; Tate Ellington as Chad; Elliot Fletcher as Trevor; Ruby Modine as Sierra; Oscar Nunez as Rick Encarnacion; Zack Pearlman as Neil; Joseph Lucero as Damon

Episode chronology
← Previous "Ouroboros"	Next → "Happily Ever After"
- Shameless season 7

"Ride or Die" is the tenth episode of the seventh season of the American television comedy drama Shameless, an adaptation of the British series of the same name. It is the 82nd overall episode of the series and was written by Dominique Morisseau and directed by Zetna Fuentes. It originally aired on Showtime on December 4, 2016.

The series is set on the South Side of Chicago, Illinois, and depicts the poor, dysfunctional family of Frank Gallagher, a neglectful single father of six: Fiona, Phillip, Ian, Debbie, Carl, and Liam. He spends his days drunk, high, or in search of money, while his children need to learn to take care of themselves. In the episode, Ian reunites with Mickey after the latter breaks out of prison. Meanwhile, Fiona gets a big offer from Margo, while Frank and Monica decide to steal a casino bus.

According to Nielsen Media Research, the episode was seen by an estimated 1.60 million household viewers and gained a 0.6 ratings share among adults aged 18–49. The episode received positive reviews from critics, who praised the tone, performances and character development.

== Plot ==
Ian (Cameron Monaghan) is distraught after learning of Mickey's prison escape, ignoring Trevor (Elliot Fletcher) in the process. As he leaves to work, a man gives him a phone, where Mickey contacts him and gives a spot to meet. Ian initially refuses to go, but eventually goes to the location, where a van kidnaps him.

Margo (Sharon Lawrence) tells Fiona (Emmy Rossum) that she owns the building wherein the laundromat is set, and offers her $80,000 to buy the laundromat from her. Fiona hesitates on the offer; she is unsure when the laundromat will eventually turn profitable, and cannot bring herself to ask Etta (June Squibb) to leave. Frank (William H. Macy) and Monica (Chloe Webb) resume their relationship, prompting Debbie (Emma Kenney) to establish a curfew at the house. Monica hopes to leave some money for her children before dying, so she enlists Frank in robbing a bank. When that proves unsuccessful, they set on a casino bus for seniors. They enlist Neil (Zack Pearlman) in pretending to be hit by the bus, allowing them to steal money from the seniors. Debbie is infuriated upon learning of it, and makes them pay Neil before kicking them out of the house.

Lip (Jeremy Allen White) continues heavily drinking, and Fiona warns him to stop or she might fire him from Patsy's. When he gets home, he drinks again. He later wakes up in a house, finding that he broke through the window. As he starts to make sense of the situation, Helene (Sasha Alexander) appears in the stairs, revealing he crashed into her house. Seeing his state, she simply asks him to get help. Lip walks away ashamed and breaks down. Finding an Alcoholics Anonymous meeting, he decides to enter. Veronica (Shanola Hampton) tries to distance herself from Svetlana (Isidora Goreshter) by throwing her clothes into the street. She and Kevin (Steve Howey) are shocked when they find that Svetlana forged the ownership papers as adoption papers. To help them, Fiona contacts Rick Encarnacion (Oscar Nunez) to help them, and repairs her friendship with Veronica. Fiona continues debating on Margo's offer, which has now increased to $160,000.

Ian is taken to a football field, where Mickey (Noel Fisher), sporting a new look, reconciles with him. Mickey reveals he plans to leave for Mexico and asks him to accompany him. Ian debates on the decision, and asks Fiona if she regrets not running away with Jimmy. Fiona says she is content with her life. He meets again with Mickey, and despite saying he has a boyfriend, they end up having sex. The following day, Ian meets with him to say goodbye. However, he changes his mind and decides to join Mickey.

== Production ==
=== Development ===
The episode was written by Dominique Morisseau and directed by Zetna Fuentes. It was Morisseau's third writing credit, and Fuentes' first directing credit.

== Reception ==
=== Viewers ===
In its original American broadcast, "Ride or Die" was seen by an estimated 1.60 million household viewers with a 0.6 in the 18–49 demographics. This means that 0.6 percent of all households with televisions watched the episode. This was a slight increase in viewership from the previous episode, which was seen by an estimated 1.56 million household viewers with a 0.6 in the 18–49 demographics.

=== Critical reviews ===
"Ride or Die" received positive reviews from critics. Myles McNutt of The A.V. Club gave the episode a "B–" grade and wrote, "“Ride Or Die” creates problems by working overly hard to identify clear causes for past behavior, and using these to rewrite the show's history in ways that oversell the importance of one character and dramatically rewrites the other. And while these views are technically being presented by the characters in the show, they felt like the writers retconning the past to simplify their task in the future, and that kind of string-pulling is where Shameless is running into problems with season seven coming to a close."

Christina Ciammaichelli of Entertainment Weekly gave the episode an "A" grade and wrote "Looks like once again, a Gallagher has chosen a path that's probably terrible for them. But then again, if the Gallaghers always made the right decisions, would we keep watching? Go ahead and ponder that question as Ian and Mickey's long-awaited reunion unfolds, Lip continues to drink himself stupid, and Fiona considers her future with the Laundromat."

Dara Driscoll of TV Overmind wrote "Shameless has almost finished its seventh season, and every episode gets better than the last." Paul Dailly of TV Fanatic gave the episode a perfect 5 star rating out of 5, and wrote, ""Ride or Die" was another solid episode of this Showtime drama. All of the characters are moving in interesting directions, and it's exciting to think about what the future hold for them."
