= Where's My Meth? =

- Shameless episode
- Episode no.: Season 8 Episode 2
- Directed by: Anthony Hemingway
- Written by: Nancy M. Pimental
- Cinematography by: Kevin McKnight
- Editing by: Russell Denove
- Original release date: November 12, 2017
- Running time: 55 minutes

Guest appearances
- Scott Michael Campbell as Brad; Laura Cerón as Celia Delgado; Elliot Fletcher as Trevor; Jamie Harris as Eric; Anna Konkle as Tenant; Ruby Modine as Sierra Morton; Zack Pearlman as Neil; Jessica Szohr as Nessa Chabon; Faran Tahir as Mr. Adeeb; Michael Patrick McGill as Tommy; Jonelle Allen as Helen Cardinal; Juliette Angelo as Geneva; Justin Giddings as Pizza Delivery Guy; Kelli Dawn Hancock as Lakisha; Chet Hanks as Charlie; Christian Isaiah as Liam Gallagher; Evan O'Toole as Dylan; Anjelika Washington as Lulu

Episode chronology
← Previous "We Become What We... Frank!"	Next → "God Bless Her Rotting Soul"
- Shameless season 8

"Where's My Meth?" is the second episode of the eighth season of the American television comedy drama Shameless, an adaptation of the British series of the same name. It is the 86th overall episode of the series and was written by executive producer Nancy M. Pimental and directed by Anthony Hemingway. It originally aired on Showtime on November 12, 2017.

The series is set on the South Side of Chicago, Illinois, and depicts the poor, dysfunctional family of Frank Gallagher, a neglectful single father of six: Fiona, Phillip, Ian, Debbie, Carl, and Liam. He spends his days drunk, high, or in search of money, while his children need to learn to take care of themselves. In the episode, Frank starts working at a home improvement store, while Fiona struggles in getting the building's residents to pay rent. Meanwhile, Lip attempts to sabotage Charlie's recovery, while Ian is unable to move on from Monica's death.

According to Nielsen Media Research, the episode was seen by an estimated 1.37 million household viewers and gained a 0.52 ratings share among adults aged 18–49. The episode received mostly positive reviews from critics, with praise towards the character development, tone and themes.

== Plot ==
As part of her first duties as the landlord, Fiona (Emmy Rossum) starts asking the residents to pay rent. However, most of the residents make excuses or simply ignore her warnings. Frank (William H. Macy) applies for a home improvement store; despite having zero labor experience, he is still hired.

While the family is moving on from Monica's death, Ian (Cameron Monaghan) still hesitates in letting Carl (Ethan Cutkosky) sell the last meth bag, as he feels it will be their last memory of her. To help him, Trevor (Elliot Fletcher) takes him to a chub bar, where they pick up two obese men to have sex with. Nevertheless, Ian unexpectedly has a breakdown over Monica's death. Liam (Christian Isaiah) spends a day with a classmate, and is fascinated by the luxuries in his house. When his classmate's nanny drives him to his house, she is shocked by the level of gang violence in the neighborhood. The classmate later has a sleepover with Liam at his house, and while he enjoys the experience, his mother is horrified to the point that she throws away his clothes.

Lip (Jeremy Allen White) continues babysitting Lucas, although he continues feeling jealous that Charlie (Chet Hanks) is back with Sierra (Ruby Modine). When Frank suggests testing him, Lip decides to send a pizza to his house, with a baggie of cocaine on top. Charlie, however, does not end up using it and Lip sees him at an AA meeting. Feeling guilty, Lip later sneaks into his house to dispose of the baggie, although he is bitten by Charlie's dog. Debbie (Emma Kenney) starts neglecting Neil (Zack Pearlman), entrusting him to take care of Franny while she goes to hang out with friends and going to night school. Kevin (Steve Howey) attends a cancer support group, while trying to make amends with people in his life before his surgery. Post-surgery, Kevin and Veronica (Shanola Hampton) are informed that his tumor is benign.

Frank displays a favorable work ethic, prompting his boss to promote him to manager after just one day. Ian uses his share of the inheritance to get a tattoo of Monica in his back, although the artist mistakes Monica as his girlfriend and only draws her breasts. He then accompanies Carl to the storage unit to check more of Monica's belongings, but are forced to flee when Monica's ex-boyfriend, Eric (Jamie Harris), demands his meth back. At Patsy's, Charlie tells Lip that he broke into his house, but he believes he was actually helping him when he told the group about his story, and hugs him. With Debbie's help, Fiona intimidates the residents at the building, serving them with eviction notices if they do not pay their rent.

== Production ==
=== Development ===
The episode was written by executive producer Nancy M. Pimental and directed by Anthony Hemingway. It was Pimental's 18th writing credit, and Hemingway's seventh directing credit.

== Reception ==
=== Viewers ===
In its original American broadcast, "Where's My Meth?" was seen by an estimated 1.37 million household viewers with a 0.52 in the 18–49 demographics. This means that 0.52 percent of all households with televisions watched the episode. This was a 27% decrease in viewership from the previous episode, which was seen by an estimated 1.86 million household viewers with a 0.73 in the 18–49 demographics.

=== Critical reviews ===
"Where's My Meth?" received mostly positive reviews from critics. Myles McNutt of The A.V. Club gave the episode a "B" grade and wrote, "While Kev's breast cancer scare storyline doesn’t really go anywhere — it's benign — it begins with the entire extended family gathering together with a cake, the type of scene that was impossible when the group was more fractured. That still has the show on solid ground, even if nothing is necessarily blowing me away at this early stage."

Derek Lawrence of Entertainment Weekly wrote "No good deed goes unpunished. Lip and his bloody leg limp into the diner to meet Brad. They're soon joined by Charlie, who’s holding Lip's fidget spinner. Busted. Actually, maybe not, since Charlie just thinks Lip heard the story and broke in to help him out. I smell a new bromance."

David Crow of Den of Geek gave the episode a 4 star rating out of 5 and wrote "Nearly every subplot echoed something we've seen from these delightful degenerates before, and the point appears clearly to be addressing the eternally uncomfortable issue of self-change, self-growth... or the lack thereof. After so many years, are the characters changing or merely running in place? And is it something they or we want?" Paul Dailly of TV Fanatic gave the episode a 4.5 star rating out of 5, and wrote, ""Where's My Meth?" was another excellent episode of this Showtime drama. Everything about it was great from start to finish, and I cannot wait to see what the rest of the season has in store for us."
