= Requiem for a Slut =

- Shameless episode
- Episode no.: Season 7 Episode 12
- Directed by: John Wells
- Written by: John Wells
- Cinematography by: Loren Yaconelli
- Editing by: John M. Valerio
- Original release date: December 18, 2016
- Running time: 60 minutes

Guest appearances
- Chloe Webb as Monica Gallagher (special guest star); John Aylward as Grandpa Bill; Scott Michael Campbell as Brad; Elliot Fletcher as Trevor; Kerri Kenney-Silver as Constance Grace; Ruby Modine as Sierra; Zack Pearlman as Neil; Barry Sloane as Ryan; David Fabrizio as Drill Instructor; Diandra Lyle as Dr. Caughey

Episode chronology
← Previous "Happily Ever After"	Next → "We Become What We... Frank!"
- Shameless season 7

"Requiem for a Slut" is the twelfth episode and season finale of the seventh season of the American television comedy drama Shameless, an adaptation of the British series of the same name. It is the 84th overall episode of the series and was written and directed by series developer John Wells. It originally aired on Showtime on December 18, 2016.

The series is set on the South Side of Chicago, Illinois, and depicts the poor, dysfunctional family of Frank Gallagher, a neglectful single father of six: Fiona, Phillip, Ian, Debbie, Carl, and Liam. He spends his days drunk, high, or in search of money, while his children need to learn to take care of themselves. In the episode, the Gallaghers prepare for Monica's funeral.

According to Nielsen Media Research, the episode was seen by an estimated 1.72 million household viewers and gained a 0.6 ratings share among adults aged 18–49. The episode received highly positive reviews from critics, who praised the performances (particularly Rossum and Macy), writing, closure to Monica's character and tone.

== Plot ==
Ian (Cameron Monaghan) returns to Chicago, while Carl (Ethan Cutkosky) is informed of Monica's death by his superior at the military school. At the hospital, the Gallaghers are informed that Monica was pronounced dead, diagnosing that she died after suffering a Intracerebral hemorrhage. While the family prepares to say goodbye, Frank (William H. Macy) cannot bring himself and walks away.

The family starts packing Monica's stuff, which includes an undisclosed key. The following morning, Carl returns and prepares a breakfast for his siblings. Fiona (Emmy Rossum) is once again approached by Ryan (Barry Sloane) on buying the tenement building, and she finally accepts. Lip (Jeremy Allen White) visits Brad (Scott Michael Campbell) at his shop, as he feels the urge of drinking after Monica's death. Brad gets him to work at his shop and invites him for dinner. At the house, Frank recognizes the key as belonging to a storage unit and enlists Debbie (Emma Kenney), Carl and Liam to help him gain access. They locate the unit, where it is revealed to be where Monica was staying. While they do not find money, Frank discovers that she left a unique inheritance of $70,000 in the form of methamphetamine. While Fiona initially opposes, the rest of the siblings refuse to flush the bags, and each one gets $10,000.

Monica's father, Bill (John Aylward), shows up after Fiona contacts him about Monica's death. He blames Frank for her death, and brutally beats him. While Fiona planned to spend very little on the funeral costs, Bill offers to pay for the funeral himself to give her a proper burial. Frank later fights with Debbie and Fiona when he cannot find the bags of meth, and Fiona gets him outside. As Frank scolds her for never respecting Monica, Fiona finally snaps, proclaiming that she was the parent that her siblings needed in their lives. She hates Monica as "she didn't give a shit about anyone but herself" and is glad that she died. Ian confesses his encounter with Mickey to Trevor (Elliot Fletcher), and they both question the future of their relationship.

At the funeral, Fiona punches Monica's body before the service. As everyone shares a eulogy, Fiona admits her problems with her, but speaks positively on how she never spoke negatively of her children. Frank delivers the final eulogy, relating how he met her and tells his children that whether they like it or not, they all have Monica within themselves. At home, the Gallaghers throw a celebration. Lip fixes his friendship with Sierra (Ruby Modine), while Fiona forgives Frank for his behavior and dances with him. Debbie begins taking welding classes, Ian resumes his paramedic job, Lip continues attending the AA meetings, Fiona is given the keys to the tenement building, and Frank and Carl make a graffiti in honor of Monica in an alley.

== Production ==
=== Development ===
The episode was written and directed by series developer John Wells. It was Wells' 15th writing credit and sixth directing credit.

== Reception ==
=== Viewers ===
In its original American broadcast, "Requiem for a Slut" was seen by an estimated 1.72 million household viewers with a 0.6 in the 18–49 demographics. This means that 0.6 percent of all households with televisions watched the episode. This was an 8% increase in viewership from the previous episode, which was seen by an estimated 1.58 million household viewers with a 0.6 in the 18–49 demographics.

=== Critical reviews ===
"Requiem for a Slut" received highly positive reviews from critics. Myles McNutt of The A.V. Club gave the episode a "B" grade and wrote, "what frustrates me about this finale is that it muddles what else we'll remember season seven by, like they forgot to write a final chapter and will just retroactively tell us what happened when we start watching season eight next year. It chooses the macro over the micro in ways that create powerful moments, but fail to coalesce into a clear statement of what the show is and what it intends to be as it treads into uncharted territory for Showtime dramas."

Christina Ciammaichelli of Entertainment Weekly wrote "And just when you think you have no more empathy for Frank, he shares a few touching words that make you think "Perhaps it will all be okay." That's how this finale felt to me, anyway... like things will be okay for the Gallaghers. I'm more excited than ever to see where the family takes us next."

Dara Driscoll of TV Overmind wrote "This season was incredible for Shameless. I hope that someone gets an award for this show, because it's a wonderfully executed show. I honestly can't wait for the next season, because like any fine thing, this show gets better with age." Paul Dailly of TV Fanatic gave the episode a perfect 5 star rating out of 5, and wrote, ""Requiem for a Slut" was Shameless at its finest. It was a poignant hour full of emotional drama, but the result was great. It showed just how far these characters have come since Shameless Season 1, while paving the way for an exciting change next season."
