= Occupy Fiona =

- Shameless episode
- Episode no.: Season 8 Episode 7
- Directed by: Iain B. MacDonald
- Written by: Molly Smith Metzler
- Cinematography by: Kevin McKnight
- Editing by: Russell Denove
- Original release date: December 17, 2017
- Running time: 54 minutes

Guest appearances
- Richard Flood as Ford Kellogg (special guest star); Juliette Angelo as Geneva; Scott Michael Campbell as Brad; Elliot Fletcher as Trevor; Sammi Hanratty as Kassidi; Ruby Modine as Sierra Morton; Alan Rosenberg as Professor Youens; Charlie Schlatter as Dr. Dick; Jessica Szohr as Nessa Chabon; Jim Hoffmaster as Kermit; Michael Patrick McGill as Tommy; Steven W. Bailey as Mr. Feehan; Ian Bedford as Kassidi's Dad; Bertila Damas as Alejandra Samayoa Hara; John Farmanesh-Bocca as Akram; Vince Melocchi as Bill

Episode chronology
← Previous "Icarus Fell and Rusty Ate Him"	Next → "Frank's Northern Southern Express"
- Shameless season 8

"Occupy Fiona" is the seventh episode of the eighth season of the American television comedy drama Shameless, an adaptation of the British series of the same name. It is the 91st overall episode of the series and was written by co-producer Molly Smith Metzler, and directed by supervising producer Iain B. MacDonald. It originally aired on Showtime on December 17, 2017.

The series is set on the South Side of Chicago, Illinois, and depicts the poor, dysfunctional family of Frank Gallagher, a neglectful single father of six: Fiona, Phillip, Ian, Debbie, Carl, and Liam. He spends his days drunk, high, or in search of money, while his children need to learn to take care of themselves. In the episode, the conflict between Fiona and Ian intensifies, while Frank looks for a new job. Meanwhile, Lip helps Youens during his DUI trial.

According to Nielsen Media Research, the episode was seen by an estimated 1.58 million household viewers and gained a 0.51 ratings share among adults aged 18–49. The episode received mixed reviews, with some expressing criticism for the subplot revolving around Fiona and Ian.

== Plot ==
Fiona (Emmy Rossum) is awakened when Ian (Cameron Monaghan) throws cold water on her bed. Later, he shows up in the field next to the tenement building with people from the youth center, beginning an "Occupy Fiona" movement to annoy her and the residents. Trevor (Elliot Fletcher) is not delighted with Ian's actions, as he is only using them to get back at his sister.

Lip (Jeremy Allen White) helps Youens (Alan Rosenberg) in preparing for his DUI trial, finding him passed out in his own vomit. He asks Brad (Scott Michael Campbell) to help him clean Youens, although Youens vomits on Brad. Carl (Ethan Cutkosky) continues running his rebahilitation center in the basement, and gets close to Kassidi (Sammi Hanratty), one of his customers. She convinces him that she could earn the money needed for the military scholarship by faking her kidnapping and cashing the ransom money. The plan works, and her father pays the money. However, the father tells Carl that this is not the first time Kassidi tried this on him.

Jobless, Frank (William H. Macy) travels the city to search for a new job, but is unsuccessful. After speaking with an illegal immigrant, Frank is inspired to begin an import-export business through the US-Canada border. Kevin (Steve Howey) tries to be more sexually dominating with Veronica (Shanola Hampton), but cannot bring himself to hit her. Debbie (Emma Kenney) is annoyed when a man acts rude to her in the parking garage, to the point that he destroys the gate. She retaliates by welding his car to a dumpster, getting herself fired in the process. Fiona meets Ford (Richard Flood), an Irish carpenter hired by Nessa. When Ian calls a fire inspector, costing her $400, Fiona decides to get back. While Ian momentarily leaves, Fiona convinces the youth people in leaving for a free pizza and paying them $20. During this, she gets city workers in taking the tents to the dump. As Ian and Trevor stare at the empty field, Fiona asks to end their rivalry; she got Margo to show them another building. While Trevor is interested, Ian refuses, angrily yelling at Fiona for her actions.

At the trial, the owner of the house that Youens crashed reveals that she is now forced to wear a neck brace. While Lip delivers a testimony to ask for leniency, Youens is revealed to be drunk during the trial, ruining his case and landing him a prison sentence, and Lip and Brad are shocked of what happened. Lip visits Youens in custody, angrily scolding him for not caring about his actions. Youens tells Lip that he appreciated his help, but he didn't ask him for a thing. Devastated, Lip asks Youens if he cares about anything, and he simply replies, "I chose booze a long time ago. You don't like what you see, don't look." Trevor tells Ian that he visited and signed the lease on Fiona's suggested apartment, angering Ian. Fiona once again tries to mend her relationship with Ian, but he is still unwilling to accept it.

== Production ==
=== Development ===
The episode was written by co-producer Molly Smith Metzler, and directed by supervising producer Iain B. MacDonald. It was Smith Metzler's first writing credit, and MacDonald's sixth directing credit.

== Reception ==
=== Viewers ===
In its original American broadcast, "Occupy Fiona" was seen by an estimated 1.58 million household viewers with a 0.51 in the 18–49 demographics. This means that 0.51 percent of all households with televisions watched the episode. This was a slight increase in viewership from the previous episode, which was seen by an estimated 1.52 million household viewers with a 0.50 in the 18–49 demographics.

=== Critical reviews ===
"Occupy Fiona" received mixed reviews. Myles McNutt of The A.V. Club gave the episode a "C–" grade and wrote, "I hate how “Occupy Fiona” deals with the aftermath of this. I hate that it turns “Is Ian off his meds” into a mystery, and makes us speculate over what is going on with Ian that he won't tell Fiona about but is causing him to do heinous and awful things. If he really is off his meds, I'm frustrated that the show is raising his bipolar diagnosis only as a solution to wild mood swings, rather than exploring the nuances of managing the disease, something the show has glossed over for the sake of efficiency for the past few seasons."

Derek Lawrence of Entertainment Weekly wrote "According to him, things are okay, but he does make mention of “larger concerns to consider.” The combination of that comment and his chilly demeanor surely leaves Fiona and viewers concerned about his current state."

David Crow of Den of Geek gave the episode a 4 star rating out of 5 and wrote "The best Shameless episodes tend to offer some bite along with their French fried fun, and this one pushed the Gallaghers further. Hopefully though not so far along that they cannot see each other behind their independent walls. We'll find out more on that front, I suspect, next week." Paul Dailly of TV Fanatic gave the episode a 3.5 star rating out of 5, and wrote, ""Occupy Fiona" was a decent episode that was let down by some of the subplots. The show is focusing on too many characters, and it's time to dial it back and focus on the characters who have been with the show since the beginning."
