= Icarus Fell and Rusty Ate Him =

- Shameless episode
- Episode no.: Season 8 Episode 6
- Directed by: Zetna Fuentes
- Written by: Mark Steilen
- Cinematography by: Kevin McKnight
- Editing by: Michael S. Stern
- Original release date: December 10, 2017
- Running time: 54 minutes

Guest appearances
- Scott Michael Campbell as Brad; Ruby Modine as Sierra Morton; Chris Prascus as Don Wessel's Kid; Alan Rosenberg as Professor Youens; Jessica Szohr as Nessa Chabon; Karimah Westbrook as Sylvie; Jim Hoffmaster as Kermit; Michael Patrick McGill as Tommy; Linda Burzynski as Officer O'Dwyer; Stephen Friedrich as Muffin Guy; Melissa Paladino as Cami Tamietti; Pat Skipper as Chuck Hartley; Melissa Sullivan as Mia

Episode chronology
← Previous "The (Mis)Education of Liam Fergus Beircheart Gallagher"	Next → "Occupy Fiona"
- Shameless season 8

"Icarus Fell and Rusty Ate Him" is the sixth episode of the eighth season of the American television comedy drama Shameless, an adaptation of the British series of the same name. It is the 90th overall episode of the series and was written by co-executive producer Mark Steilen, and directed by Zetna Fuentes. It originally aired on Showtime on December 10, 2017.

The series is set on the South Side of Chicago, Illinois, and depicts the poor, dysfunctional family of Frank Gallagher, a neglectful single father of six: Fiona, Phillip, Ian, Debbie, Carl, and Liam. He spends his days drunk, high, or in search of money, while his children need to learn to take care of themselves. In the episode, Fiona discovers a dead woman in the building, while Frank receives a promotion. Meanwhile, Lip helps Brad in recovering, while Debbie tries to find a pill.

According to Nielsen Media Research, the episode was seen by an estimated 1.52 million household viewers and gained a 0.50 ratings share among adults aged 18–49. The episode received mixed reviews, who were divided over the different subplots.

== Plot ==
When an apartment begins flooding, Fiona (Emmy Rossum) decides to check on the elderly resident. However, she is shocked when she finds that she has died, with her dog licking her blood. Frank (William H. Macy) is named "Employee of the Month" at the store, and receives his first-ever credit card, which he uses to buy a new car.

Brad (Scott Michael Campbell) goes missing, so Lip (Jeremy Allen White) enlists Youens (Alan Rosenberg) in tracking him. They question his wife, who states that she will not allow him back in the house until he is sober. They discover that he has crashed his truck. Kevin (Steve Howey) starts to feel left out in his relationship with Veronica (Shanola Hampton) and Svetlana (Isidora Goreshter), as Veronica seems to enjoy Svetlana's presence more during sex. He begins to question his sexuality, and mistakes a man at Patsy's for a gay trying to seduce him. He later tries to perform oral sex on a man, but realizes he is not turned on by the experience.

Debbie (Emma Kenney) and Duran (David Brackett) arrive at a motel in Missouri as part of their road trip. They have sex, and Debbie realizes the following morning that they did not use protection. She has 39 hours before a pregnancy is possible. She struggles in finding pills, as the pharmacies lack them or because she is denied due to her age. Desperate, she asks a woman to buy the pills for her. The woman instead tries to flee with her money, so Debbie attacks her, landing them in jail. To earn money for his scholarship, Carl (Ethan Cutkosky) has started a detoxing business in the basement. He also helps Lip in finding Brad, and Lip forces Brad to get into his car to get him to rehab.

The woman's death startles Fiona, who questions her mortality. She also gets into conflicts with Ian (Cameron Monaghan) over buying the church. As Veronica comforts her, she realizes that the reason behind why she prefers Svetlana in sex is because she likes to be sexually dominated. Debbie is bailed out by Duran, and manages to get a pill just before the 39 hours pass. Frank is called by a corporate employee and is given bad news; he is getting fired as corporate has decided to close the stores across the country. Fiona hangs up a photo of the elderly resident in her memory, and decides to adopt her dog.

== Production ==
=== Development ===
The episode was written by co-executive producer Mark Steilen, and directed by Zetna Fuentes. It was Steilen's first writing credit, and Fuentes' second directing credit.

== Reception ==
=== Viewers ===
In its original American broadcast, "Icarus Fell and Rusty Ate Him" was seen by an estimated 1.52 million household viewers with a 0.50 in the 18–49 demographics. This means that 0.50 percent of all households with televisions watched the episode. This was a slight increase in viewership from the previous episode, which was seen by an estimated 1.51 million household viewers with a 0.57 in the 18–49 demographics.

=== Critical reviews ===
"Icarus Fell and Rusty Ate Him" received mixed reviews. Myles McNutt of The A.V. Club gave the episode a "C+" grade and wrote, "William H. Macy has never not been good in this role, but this is easily the most I've been invested in a Frank storyline. And perhaps the reason is because I feel like I can draw a line between this story and the show Shameless was before — it's fine for the show to evolve, and I will acknowledge it was necessary for the show to sustain itself, but there's a point where disparate storylines push the show away from its strengths, and much of this episode fell into that category."

Derek Lawrence of Entertainment Weekly wrote "Fiona is putting up the picture of Mrs. Cardinal and her husband in the building. It's not the only thing she kept; Fiona couldn't bare to let animal control take the dog. She might be his new owner, but she's smart enough not to allow any licking (we all know where that tongue has been)."

David Crow of Den of Geek gave the episode a 3.5 star rating out of 5 and wrote "It is a nice thought that helps elevates this whimsical and fairly slight hour into something worth considering while also exploring your sexual fluidity in the bathroom with a football player built “like a Greek God!” Because who hasn't been there yet, am I right?" Paul Dailly of TV Fanatic gave the episode a 3.5 star rating out of 5, and wrote, ""Icarus Fell and Rusty Ate Him" was a hit or miss episode. Some storylines were fun while others were not that interesting."
