= Fuck Paying It Forward =

- Shameless episode
- Episode no.: Season 8 Episode 4
- Directed by: Regina King
- Written by: Dominique Morisseau
- Cinematography by: Kevin McKnight
- Editing by: Russell Denove
- Original release date: November 26, 2017
- Running time: 53 minutes

Guest appearances
- Dermot Mulroney as Sean Pierce (special guest star); Juliette Angelo as Geneva; Scott Michael Campbell as Brad; Dale Dickey as Aunt Ronnie; Elliot Fletcher as Trevor; Ruby Modine as Sierra Morton; Jessica Szohr as Nessa Chabon; Raffi Barsoumian as Bahir; Bre Blair as Cynthia; Christian Isaiah as Liam Gallagher; Jennifer Taylor as Anne Seery; Levy Tran as Eddie

Episode chronology
← Previous "God Bless Her Rotting Soul"	Next → "The (Mis)Education of Liam Fergus Beircheart Gallagher"
- Shameless season 8

"Fuck Paying It Forward" is the fourth episode of the eighth season of the American television comedy drama Shameless, an adaptation of the British series of the same name. It is the 88th overall episode of the series and was written by co-producer Dominique Morisseau and directed by Regina King. It originally aired on Showtime on November 26, 2017.

The series is set on the South Side of Chicago, Illinois, and depicts the poor, dysfunctional family of Frank Gallagher, a neglectful single father of six: Fiona, Phillip, Ian, Debbie, Carl, and Liam. He spends his days drunk, high, or in search of money, while his children need to learn to take care of themselves. In the episode, Fiona is shaken when Sean returns in her life, while Frank decides to be more active in Liam's life.

According to Nielsen Media Research, the episode was seen by an estimated 1.59 million household viewers and gained a 0.61 ratings share among adults aged 18–49. The episode received mostly positive reviews from critics, who praised the character development and humor in the episode.

== Plot ==
Having been kicked out, Debbie (Emma Kenney) and Franny move back to the Gallagher household. Fiona (Emmy Rossum) allows her in returning, as a favor for helping her at the tenement building. As they leave to take care of a new situation, they are shocked when Sean (Dermot Mulroney) appears. While he wants to talk with Fiona, she simply ignores him.

Frank (William H. Macy) feels that his time to fix his relationship with his children is over, so he resorts to help Liam, feeling he is his only unaffected child. He accompanies him to school, where he joins the PTA. He later helps the PTA in a voluntary car wash, where he plays with Liam. Brad (Scott Michael Campbell) tells Lip (Jeremy Allen White) that he should consider a "no strings attached" relationship. Lip uses Tinder to find a date, and quickly gets a match. However, he finds that the girl has been drinking, so Lip chooses to leave her before going any further. Ian (Cameron Monaghan) lets a shelter girl of Trevor's sleep at the Gallagher house to help her out of a bad spot. Trevor (Elliot Fletcher) confronts Ian, finding his actions inappropriate; Ian promises to find a living situation for the shelter kids.

Kevin (Steve Howey) and Veronica (Shanola Hampton) arrive at Kentucky to visit Kevin's biological family. He reunites with his aunt, Ronnie (Dale Dickey), who informs him that his father died while his mother abandoned them. She also reveals that his abandonment was an accident; his parents simply forgot about him at a gas station. While Kevin has fun in hanging out with his family, Veronica is disturbed by the family's racist traits. While she was planning to just ignore Sean, Fiona ends up meeting with him at a restaurant. Sean apologizes for his actions, proclaiming that he has been sober for one year. He offers to pay her the wedding costs, but Fiona turns it down. She believes he wants to get back with her, but discovers that Sean is married and only wants to make amends, so Fiona walks out.

Carl (Ethan Cutkosky) attempts to catch a junkie breaking into houses on the block, after learning the thief stole a disabled veteran's medals. Lip's co-worker, Eddie (Levy Tran), who previously rejected his advances, decides to have sex with him. Kevin discovers that his aunt lied, and that his parents simply chose to abandon him. While he admits separating from his family resulted in a better life for him, he chooses to leave his birth family behind. Fiona insults a woman at Sean's motel, mistaking her for Sean's wife, only for Sean and his wife to arrive. That night, Fiona shares the story with her family. When Frank and Liam arrive, Franny walks towards Frank, astonishing the family. Carl walks outside, discovering that the thief has fallen into one of his traps.

== Production ==
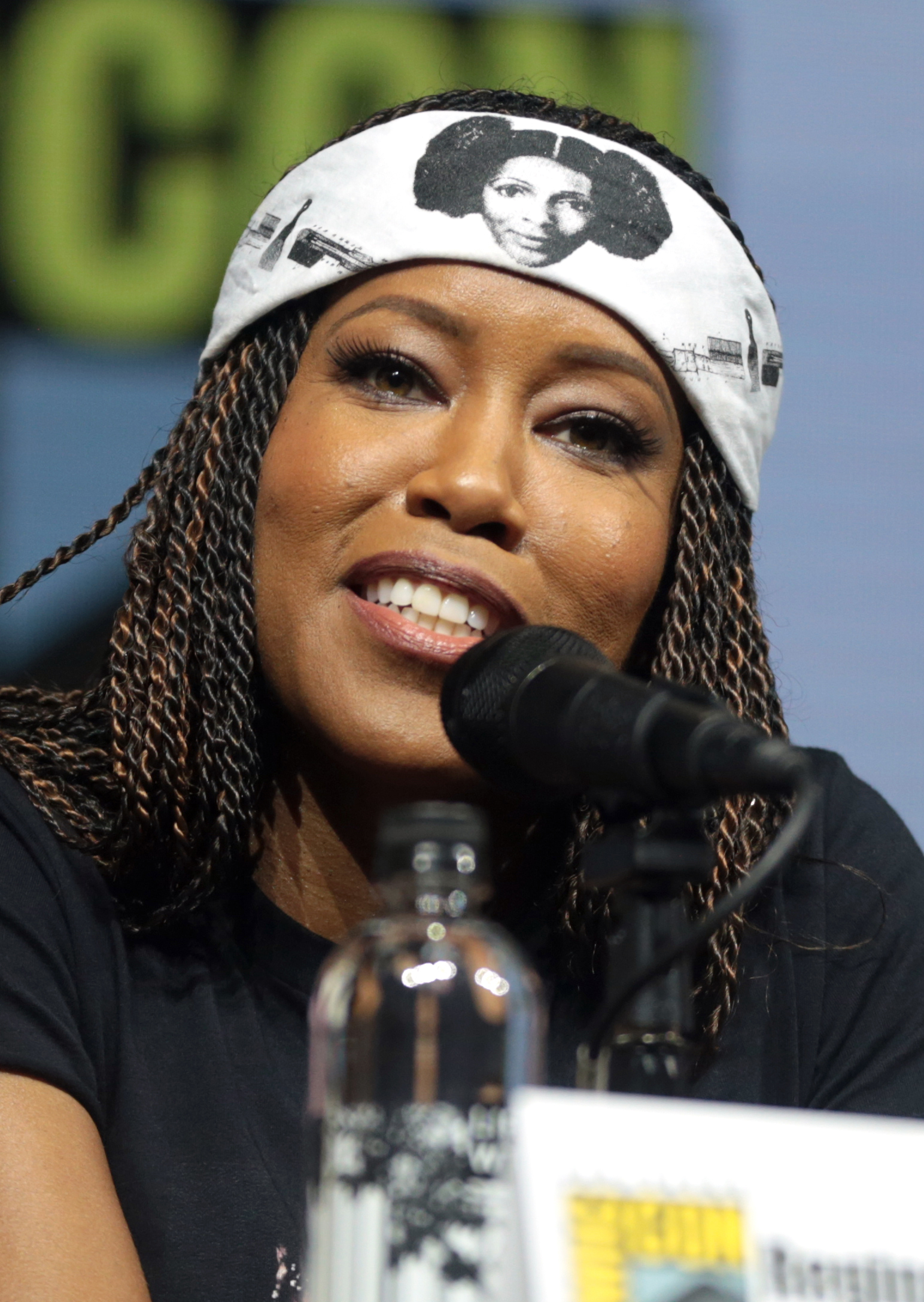
Regina King

The episode was written by co-producer Dominique Morisseau and directed by Regina King. It was Morisseau's fourth writing credit, and King's first directing credit.

== Reception ==
=== Viewers ===
In its original American broadcast, "Fuck Paying It Forward" was seen by an estimated 1.59 million household viewers with a 0.61 in the 18–49 demographics. This means that 0.61 percent of all households with televisions watched the episode. This was a 18 percent increase in viewership from the previous episode, which was seen by an estimated 1.34 million household viewers with a 0.47 in the 18–49 demographics.

=== Critical reviews ===
"Fuck Paying It Forward" received mostly positive reviews from critics. Myles McNutt of The A.V. Club gave the episode a "B" grade and wrote, "The cycle of a soap opera — and Shameless is, at its core, a soap opera — requires tests. Characters who have a tendency to make bad decisions (so crucial for a soap opera to function) will have moments of progress, but then something or someone will emerge to challenge that progress. The more the cycle repeats, however, the more we learn to distrust progress, knowing that inevitably something will come along to upset the balance and erase the growth that had pushed the characters forward."

Derek Lawrence of Entertainment Weekly wrote "Many wild things have happened at the Gallagher household, but “F— Paying It Forward” manages a first: turning it into a strip club. Instead of siblings and deadbeat dads, Lip finds himself surrounded by naked women. Psych — Lip wakes up erect with Liam at the edge of his bed playing with action figures. “Another stiffy?” asks his brother. TMI, Liam. TMI."

David Crow of Den of Geek gave the episode a 3 star rating out of 5 and wrote "Overall, it was a perfectly serviceable episode of Shameless with a few really inspired moments involving St. Francis in a PTA meeting or V worrying that the rednecks have decapitated poor, dim Kev. It was also inevitable the episode would be a comedown after last week, let's just hope that next Sunday it comes back up a with a little more Gallagher swagger." Paul Dailly of TV Fanatic gave the episode a 4.5 star rating out of 5, and wrote, ""F**k Paying It Forward" was a solid episode of this Showtime hit. There was humor, solid acting, and some crazy drama which all culminated in one of the best episodes in a long time."
