= Happily Ever After (Shameless) =

- Shameless episode
- Episode no.: Season 7 Episode 11
- Directed by: John M. Valerio
- Written by: Etan Frankel
- Cinematography by: Loren Yaconelli
- Editing by: Omar Hassan-Reep
- Original release date: December 11, 2016
- Running time: 56 minutes

Guest appearances
- Noel Fisher as Mickey Milkovich (special guest star); June Squibb as Etta (special guest star); Chloe Webb as Monica Gallagher (special guest star); Scott Michael Campbell as Brad; Tate Ellington as Chad; Ruby Modine as Sierra; Zack Pearlman as Neil; Barry Sloane as Ryan; Wilson Cruz as Bartender; Seidy López as Interviewer; Joseph Lucero as Damon; Rolando Molina as Jesus

Episode chronology
| ← Previous "Ride or Die" | Next → "Requiem for a Slut" |
- Shameless season 7

"Happily Ever After" is the eleventh episode of the seventh season of the American television comedy drama Shameless, an adaptation of the British series of the same name. It is the 83rd overall episode of the series and was written by executive producer Etan Frankel and directed by John M. Valerio. It originally aired on Showtime on December 11, 2016.

The series is set on the South Side of Chicago, Illinois, and depicts the poor, dysfunctional family of Frank Gallagher, a neglectful single father of six: Fiona, Phillip, Ian, Debbie, Carl, and Liam. He spends his days drunk, high, or in search of money, while his children need to learn to take care of themselves. In the episode, Ian accompanies Mickey to Mexico, while Frank and Monica decide to renew their vows.

According to Nielsen Media Research, the episode was seen by an estimated 1.58 million household viewers and gained a 0.6 ratings share among adults aged 18–49. The episode received critical acclaim, who praised the performances and ending.

== Plot ==
Ian (Cameron Monaghan) and Mickey (Noel Fisher) leave Illinois, heading for Mexico. Ian has not informed his family nor Trevor about his plans, and is still not fully convinced by the idea of fleeing. They are accompanied by Damon (Joseph Lucero), Mickey's cellmate. However, they decide to abandon Damon after he almost gets them killed at a gas station.

Frank (William H. Macy) and Monica (Chloe Webb) awaken after having participated at an orgy. As they rob the people's wallets and jewelry, Frank feels inspired and decides to ask Monica to marry him again, which she accepts. While they invite their children, only Debbie (Emma Kenney) and Liam agree to attend the wedding. Fiona (Emmy Rossum) decides to accept Margo's $160,000 offer for the laundromat, and gets Etta (June Squibb) to stay with her. She uses the money to buy a new car, although Lip (Jeremy Allen White) is not content with the idea. She visits the laundromat, which has now been turned into a networking venture for Margo and Chad (Tate Ellington). Chad introduces her to Ryan (Barry Sloane), a real estate agent. Ryan takes Fiona to his apartment and they have sex. Afterwards, Fiona expresses interest in buying the building from him, feeling she can replicate the laundromat's success.

Having lost the Alibi, Kevin (Steve Howey) and Veronica (Shanola Hampton) struggle in finding new jobs. Kevin visits many workplaces, but he fails to impress the interviewers. Desperate, he visits a local gay club to become a bartender. He is initially dismissed for his sexuality, but they reluctantly hire him as a dancer for one night to test him. Kevin impresses the crowd and he gets the job. He is also told that he can earn $500 by letting the customers masturbate him. He strongly considers it, although Veronica is upset when she learns about it. Lip attempts to get his sobriety under control and befriends fellow AA member Brad (Scott Michael Campbell). They hang out at Patsy's, and Brad suggests Lip could help himself by knitting. Frank and Monica decide to get married at their house. As Monica reads her vows, they get into a brutal fight again. Frank later apologizes and recites his vows from their first wedding. They decide to party that night, where Fiona and Lip reluctantly join them. It is revealed that they laced their drinks with drugs. While initially upset, Fiona and Lip decide to dance with their parents and celebrate.

Ian and Mickey find that Mickey's contact will not help them escape as he is a fugitive. Ian then heads to a bank, where he withdraws all his earnings. While camping under a bridge, Mickey asks him why he never visited him, and Ian admits feeling confused. Upon arriving at the border, Ian changes his mind and proclaims he is a changed man. He says goodbye to Mickey, leaving him with the money. Mickey accepts Ian's decision and they share a kiss, before Mickey successfully crosses the border with a disguise. Fiona takes Etta to an assisted living facility, and is devastated as she leaves a confused Etta behind. Back at home, Frank wakes up from the party, only to discover that Monica died in her sleep. He tries unsuccessfully in reviving her, just as Lip, Debbie and Liam walk in.

== Production ==
=== Development ===
The episode was written by executive producer Etan Frankel and directed by John M. Valerio. It was Frankel's 13th writing credit, and Valerio's first directing credit.

=== Writing ===
When questioned over Ian's decision, Noel Fisher explained, "I look it at more as they've spent a lot of time co-evolving and helping each other grow and learning from each other and supporting each other through a lot of crazy and, in some cases, kind of horrible stuff. Or hard stuff, at the very least. So I think that Ian, like Mickey, is discovering more and more who he is and what he wants his life to be and his responsibility in being in the driver's seat for that."

== Reception ==
=== Viewers ===
In its original American broadcast, "Happily Ever After" was seen by an estimated 1.58 million household viewers with a 0.6 in the 18–49 demographics. This means that 0.6 percent of all households with televisions watched the episode. This was a slight decrease in viewership from the previous episode, which was seen by an estimated 1.60 million household viewers with a 0.6 in the 18–49 demographics.

=== Critical reviews ===
"Happily Ever After" received critical acclaim. Myles McNutt of The A.V. Club gave the episode an "A–" grade and wrote, "“Happily Ever After” is the episode of Shameless where dreams go to die — in the case of Monica, literally. I know many seemed skeptical about Monica’s condition, but in truth I never really doubted it — logically, if we are bringing Monica back after so long, it is with a deeper purpose, and we are at the point in the show's life where Monica conning her family again has no narrative value. Monica dying, however, is just smart storytelling: it takes something that the characters — and to some degree the show — has taken as a foregone conclusion and actually makes it a reality."

Christina Ciammaichelli of Entertainment Weekly gave the episode a "B+" grade and wrote "Love and loss abound in another heart-wrenching penultimate episode of Shameless. A maybe-final farewell to two beloved characters — and, somehow, an introduction to two new ones — all played out in tonight's “Happily Ever After.”" Paul Dailly of TV Fanatic gave the episode a 4.3 star rating out of 5, and wrote, ""Happily Ever After" was a solid episode that set the wheels in motion for what could be the series finale. I'm not ready to say goodbye to the best family on TV, so I hope something can be worked out for at least one more season."
