= The Virginity Hit =

2010 comedy film by Huck Botko and Andrew Gurland

- Theatrical release poster
- Directed by: Huck Botko; Andrew Gurland
- Written by: Andrew Gurland; Huck Botko
- Produced by: Will Ferrell; Adam McKay; Chris Henchy; Peter Principato; Paul Young
- Starring: Matt Bennett; Zack Pearlman
- Cinematography: Luke Geissbuhler
- Edited by: Geoffrey Richman
- Production companies: Columbia Pictures; Gary Sanchez Productions; Principato Young Management
- Distributed by: Sony Pictures Releasing
- Release date: September 10, 2010
- Running time: 86 minutes
- Country: United States
- Language: English
- Budget: $2 million
- Box office: $636,706

The Virginity Hit is a 2010 American found-footage comedy film directed by Huck Botko and Andrew Gurland, produced by Adam McKay and Will Ferrell, and starring Matt Bennett, Zack Pearlman, Jacob Davich, Justin Kline and Nicole Weaver. The film itself is a series of videos on a teenager's attempt to lose his virginity, being recorded from cell phones to video cameras. Most of the cast used their own names for their characters.

== Plot ==
Four male teenage friends in New Orleans, Louisiana: Matt, Zack, Jacob and Justin, buy a bong and agree to use it only to celebrate when one of the four have sex for the first time. The boys are beginning to lose their virginity and Matt is the last one. Matt is the adopted brother of Zack after Matt's mother died from cancer when he was 9. Matt's father had drug issues, and only plays a minor role in his life. Matt has been with his girlfriend Nicole for almost two years and the two decide to lose their virginity together on their second anniversary. Zack decides to videotape the entire process to make his own documentary-type film.

As Matt prepares for the big night, he discovers that Nicole has cheated on him with a college fraternity member, Harry. Zack goes to find Harry to confirm if it is true, but he refuses to answer. Matt and the guys assume she did in fact have sex with Harry and the plan for the big night is soon altered. Zack decides the best thing for Matt to do is still have sex with Nicole but break up with her immediately afterwards. He feels this would be great for the documentary he is making. Matt and his friends set up a date for Matt at a hotel, but when Nicole realizes they are being filmed and recorded from the adjoining room, she becomes angry at Matt, and admits she did not go very far sexually with Harry. She claims he had only sucked on her breasts. Nicole's father then comes and takes Nicole away from Matt and then pushes Matt into a bush after he breaks up with her. The entire segment on the failed date soon becomes popular on YouTube. A young woman, Becca, sees the video and claims that she feels bad for Matt. She leaves a video response letting him know she is experienced and would love to be his first. Becca's first requirement for the date is that Matt buys a very expensive suit. Matt is then reminded by Zack that his mother left him a large amount of money and convinces Matt to withdraw it for the suit. Matt then learns that his father withdrew the money when he was younger and the funds are not available. Angered by this, Matt decides to confront his father about it. After doing so, he learns his father has no desire to pay him back and claims the money was used for drugs. The boys and Krysta, Zack's sister and Matt's other adopted sibling, get drunk and camp. During this time Krysta unsuccessfully tries to have sex with Matt. When the boys return home, they come up with a plot to steal the suit, which is successful.

Matt finally meets Becca and she tells him that she has a son. They then plan the date and as she is leaving, hands Matt a note that lets him know he needs to be shaven in all parts of his body including his pubic region. Preparing for the date, Zack ends up shaving Matt's pubic region for him. When Matt arrives at Becca's residence, he is told by Becca the cameras cannot stay and film, and that he must practice sex on a blow-up doll, which has an inflatable penis as well. Instructed by Becca, Matt uses the doll's penis in place of the vagina. Becca then leaves for nearly 3 hours before Matt leaves. The film then shows Becca on a video blog admitting her name is not Becca and that she is actually a graduate student studying male behavior and notes that he waited over twice as long as any other male had in the past. She also admits that her child was not hers, but someone else that she used for her studies. The video of him with the blow up doll becomes a huge YouTube success and ends up leaving Matt ashamed and embarrassed, leading to him staying in his room for two weeks.

In an effort to get Matt out his funk, the boys come up with a plan for Matt to have sex with his favorite porn star, Sunny Leone. They contact her and she agrees as long as the funds are paid. The boys and others raise the funds and then come up with a plan that Jacob is going into the military to be able to get Matt out of the house. They go to a strip club and meet Sunny and then go out to her bus so Matt may have sex with her. In the bus, Sunny lets Matt know that she has changed her mind and says that he should find someone he loves to have sex with. He then requests to spend five minutes alone with her, which is granted. After a few minutes, Matt emerges from her bedroom and Sunny can be seen putting her shirt back on. He sucked on her breasts to even out what Nicole did to him. He then finds Nicole at a party, explains what he did, and the two have sex. The boys use the bong to celebrate Matt losing his virginity.

== Cast ==
- Matt Bennett as Matt
- Zack Pearlman as Zack
- Jacob Davich as Jacob
- Justin Kline as Justin
- Krysta Rodriguez as Krysta
- Nicole Weaver as Nicole
- Harry Zittel as Harry
- Savannah Welch as Becca
- Tina Parker as Tina
- Sunny Leone as Sunny
- Ashton Leigh as Ashton

== Production ==
Filming took place in New Orleans, Louisiana during the summer of 2009. Much of the footage was shot by the cast themselves, for a span of months. Lead actor Matt Bennett stated "20 percent" of the film was scripted and the cast were given freedom to create scenes.

== Marketing ==
The film was announced and later screened at San Diego Comic-Con, during McKay and Ferrell's presentation for the film, The Other Guys (directed by McKay and starring Ferrell).

To help promote the film, billboards with a help line for people who are still virgins were released. Local politicians in Louisiana, Miami, San Diego, and Arizona demanded the removal of the billboards.

A trailer was attached to The Last Exorcism, a film written by Botko and Gurland.

== Reception ==
The film received largely negative reviews from critics. On Rotten Tomatoes, the film has an approval rating of 29% based on reviews from 49 critics, with an average rating of 4.6/10. The website's critics consensus reads: "A found footage farce without any trace of believability, The Virginity Hit is a painfully unfunny sex comedy that is even more amateurish than its hapless protagonist." On Metacritic the film has a score of 40 out of 100 based on reviews from 17 critics.
