= Mulaney =

American television sitcom (2014–2015)

- Genre: Sitcom
- Created by: John Mulaney
- Directed by: Andy Ackerman
- Starring: John Mulaney; Nasim Pedrad; Seaton Smith; Zack Pearlman; Elliott Gould; Martin Short
- Composer: Chris Allen Lee
- Country of origin: United States
- Original language: English
- No. of seasons: 1
- No. of episodes: 13

Production
- Executive producers: Lorne Michaels; John Mulaney; Andy Ackerman; Andy Singer; Dave Becky; David Miner; Jon Pollack
- Camera setup: Multi-camera
- Running time: 22 minutes
- Production companies: Broadway Video; Jurny Mulurny Television; 3 Arts Entertainment; Universal Television

Original release
- Network: Fox
- Release: October 5, 2014 – February 15, 2015

Mulaney is an American sitcom that aired on Fox from October 5, 2014, to February 15, 2015. Stand-up comedian and former Saturday Night Live writer John Mulaney created the show and starred as a fictionalized version of himself. At the beginning of each episode, and sometimes throughout, Mulaney performed stand-up comedy to the studio audience. The show suffered from low ratings and poor critical reviews, and was cancelled in February 2015.

== Premise ==
John Mulaney is a comedian living in New York City with his roommates—Jane (Nasim Pedrad), a personal trainer with emotional issues, and Motif (Seaton Smith), a fellow stand-up comedian. John often receives advice from his elderly Jewish neighbor Oscar (Elliott Gould), and visits from his odd and annoying friend Andre (Zack Pearlman), a small-time drug dealer. John's life changes when he is hired as a writer for Lou Cannon (Martin Short), an eccentric, legendary comedian and game show host.

== Cast and characters ==
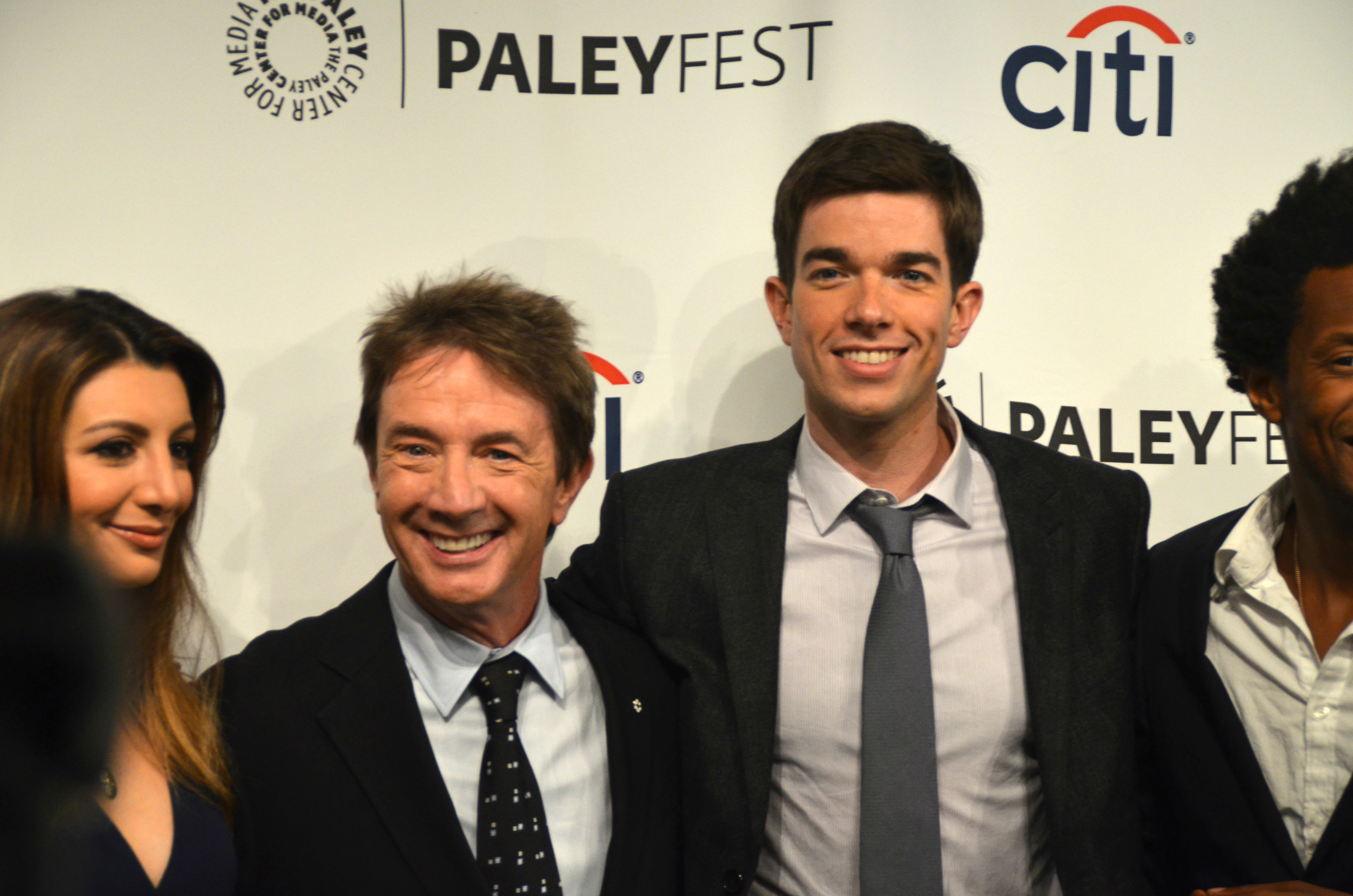
Cast members Nasim Pedrad, Martin Short and John Mulaney

=== Main ===
- John Mulaney as John Mulaney, a stand-up comedian and writer for Lou Cannon
- Nasim Pedrad as Googoosh "Jane" Parvana, a personal trainer
- Seaton Smith as Gerald "Motif" Goods, a stand-up comedian
- Zack Pearlman as Andre Van Horn, a drug dealer
- Elliott Gould as Oscar Glass, neighbor to John, Jane and Motif
- Martin Short as Louis "Lou" Cannon, a game show host and John's boss

=== Recurring ===
- Fortune Feimster as Mary Jo
- Julie Klausner as Donna

=== Guest stars ===
- Maria Thayer as Amanda the Doula
- Dan Mintz as Mintz
- Lorraine Bracco as Vaughn
- Penny Marshall as Tutti
- Nora Dunn as Patty Mulaney, John's mother
- Pete Holmes as Father Trey
- Nick Kroll as Jesse Tyler Munoz
- Bailee Madison as Ruby
- Dean Cain as himself

== Production ==
The show was originally developed at NBC, under the title Mulaney Don't Drink. As Mulaney said later, “It was based on the time in my life when I got sober at 23 and had two roommates and was just trying to figure out: What does a good person do? ... There was really something lost when I, on the advice of others higher up, took that out." A straighter version of the pilot was made, but was not picked up by NBC.

Mulaney re-tooled the pilot again, and then pitched it to Fox, who picked the show up with a cautious six-episode commitment. Fox later ordered an additional ten episodes. A trailer was released on May 12, 2014, along with an announcement that the show would air Sunday nights at 9:30 p.m., replacing the Seth MacFarlane sitcom, American Dad!, which moved to TBS. The series premiered October 5, 2014.

On October 18, 2014, the day before the third episode was supposed to air, Fox announced it was cutting three episodes from its order. This resulted in the production of Mulaney being shut down, as the thirteenth episode had already been filmed and production of the fourteenth was about to begin. Less than a month later, Fox moved Mulaney into the 7:30 PM timeslot where Bob's Burgers had been airing. The season ended on February 15, 2015, and Fox announced Mulaney's cancellation shortly thereafter.

== Episodes ==
Every episode of the series was directed by Andy Ackerman.

No.	Title	Written by	Original release date	Prod. code	US viewers (millions)
1	"Pilot" "Mo'laney, Mo'Problems"	John Mulaney	October 5, 2014	101	2.30
Stand-up comedian John Mulaney gets hired by comedian Lou Cannon as a writer on his show. Jane attempts to prove an ex-boyfriend she isn't crazy. Motif struggles to write a joke.
2	"The Doula"	John Mulaney	October 12, 2014	107	2.19
John starts dating a doula who helps him deal with his fear of childbirth. Meanwhile, Lou's outrageous on-screen behavior warrants John's attention. Guest starring Fortune Feimster as Mary Jo and Maria Thayer as Amanda the Doula
3	"Halloween"	Dan Mintz	October 19, 2014	110	2.25
As a tribute to his recently deceased neighbor, John uses jokes from his deceased neighbor, Lapidus, in Lou's monologue to prove he's a good writer in order to get his contract renewed. Meanwhile, Jane tries to get Lapidus' cheap apartment. Guest starring Fortune Feimster as Mary Jo and Dan Mintz as Mintz
4	"Sweet Jane"	John Mulaney	November 2, 2014	102	1.63
John wonders why Jane doesn't like any of his girlfriends. Lou fixates on his death.
5	"In the Name of the Mother, and the Son, and the Holy Andre"	Karey Dornetto	November 9, 2014	111	1.99
John's parents visit, forcing him to lie about going to church. Jane begins a new pill and suffers side effects. Guest starring James Handy as Father Ed, Nora Dunn as Patty Mulaney, and Pete Holmes as Father Trey
6	"Patriot Acts"	Justin Spitzer	November 23, 2014	113	1.65
Jane begins dating a Marine. When feeling the pressure that he hasn't contributed to the military, John auditions to be in a USO show. Guest starring Fortune Feimster as Mary Jo
7	"Motif & The City"	Rachel Axler	November 30, 2014	109	1.55
When Motif learns John and Jane are not adding him to the apartment lease, he leans on his three girlfriends for support. Lou's audience plant demands a contract.
8	"It's a Wonderful Home Alone"	Dan Levy	December 21, 2014	112	0.99
John finds himself home alone for Christmas when he lets his resentment of Home Alone impact the holiday. Lou learns his rival is planning a special that will compete with his. Andre is mistaken for a puppet. Guest starring Nick Kroll as Jesse Tyler Munoz
9	"Worlds Collide"	Karey Dornetto	January 11, 2015	104	1.32
John quickly regrets mixing his home and work lives when Jane becomes Lou's new personal trainer. Meanwhile, Motif turns to Oscar for advice on his stand-up routine.
10	"French Roast"	Dan Levy	January 18, 2015	103	3.38
John becomes conflicted when he is invited to Lou's celebrity roast. Meanwhile, Jane takes lessons on how to be a lady from Oscar to impress a new date.
11	"Power Moves"	Dan Mintz & Marika Sawyer	January 25, 2015	105	1.03
John takes Lou's advice about trying to control his roommates, but it turns into a fight with Motif. Meanwhile, Jane gets a new cat Omar and becomes frustrated when she can't get it to like her. Lou tries to get a movie role to showcase his dramatic side.
12	"Ruby"	Marika Sawyer	February 8, 2015	108	1.23
John dates a single mother and befriends her daughter, Ruby. However, John soon finds his new girlfriend annoying, but refuses to jeopardize his new friendship with Ruby. Guest starring Bailee Madison as Ruby
13	"Life Is a Series of Different Apartments"	John Mulaney	February 15, 2015	106	1.11
When the apartment gets infested with bed bugs, John and the gang secretly go to Lou's place, where Oscar's "treats" and Lou's early return lead to problems. Meanwhile, Oscar and Lou fight over who is John's mentor.

== Reception ==
Mulaney said:

I look back on making the show really fondly. It's my noble failure. I tried, and I wanted to do it this way. Some people liked it—just not enough.

Before Mulaney aired, critics were wary of the direction of the show. After viewing the show's trailer, Eric Dodds with TIME magazine penned an article called, "8 Ways the Trailer for Mulaney Resembles Seinfeld," and said it could "trigger a little déjà vu." In regard to its multi-camera format, Canadian magazine Maclean's asked, "why would a cool comic pick such an uncool format?"

Ultimately, the show was panned by critics, with most reviews drawing unflattering comparisons to Seinfeld. On Rotten Tomatoes, the show has an approval rating of 17% based on 42 reviews, with an average rating of 4.27/10. The site's critical consensus states, "John Mulaney, we know Jerry Seinfeld. Seinfeld was funny. Mulaney, you're no Seinfeld." On Metacritic, the series has a weighted average score of 38 out of 100, based on 27 critics, indicating "generally unfavorable reviews".

James Poniewozik with TIME magazine said the show "seems like something a dutiful student might have produced for his final project in his 'Tropes and Themes in the 1990s Sitcom' class." Robert Bianco with USA Today called the sitcom a "misfire." The show was named the fourth-worst show of 2014 by Entertainment Weekly.

Mulaney fared poorly commercially as well, with the series premiere only getting 2.3 million viewers, the weakest scores for any of the fall's series premieres. The episode from December 21, 2014, became the lowest rated episode, with fewer than 1 million views; the January 18, 2015, episode, airing after the NFC Championship Game, became the highest-rated, with over 3 million viewers.
