= Zetna Fuentes =

American television director

- Occupations: Television director, theatre director
- Years active: 1996–present

Zetna Fuentes is an American television director. She was nominated for three Daytime Emmy Awards for work on the soap opera One Life to Live, as a part of the directing team. She was nominated for Best Director – Television at Imgen Awards in 2022 for This Is Us.

Fuentes is also a theatre director, having directed a number of New York Off-Broadway productions. She was born and raised in the Bronx, New York.

== Directing credits ==
- Guiding Light
- One Life to Live
- Pretty Little Liars
- The Carrie Diaries
- Switched at Birth
- The Fosters
- Grey's Anatomy
- Jane the Virgin
- iZombie
- Forever
- How to Get Away with Murder
- Longmire
- Pitch
- Shameless
- Ray Donovan
- The Chi
- Bosch
- The Nevers
- The Great
- Scandal
- This Is Us
- Bosch: Legacy
- The Old Man
- The Agency: Central Intelligence
- Pluribus
