= Perry Mattfeld =

American actress

- Occupation: Actress
- Years active: 2006–present
- Spouse: Mark Sanchez (m. 2023)
- Children: 2

Perry Mattfeld is an American actress and producer. She is known for her portrayal of a blind woman in The CW crime drama In the Dark, as well as her role in the Hulu sports comedy Chad Powers. In her early career, she played small roles as Mel in Shameless and FrankenGirl in Wizards of Waverly Place.

== Early life ==
Mattfeld grew up in Long Beach, California. Her mother is of Mexican descent. Her grandparents and great-grandparents were entertainers. She participated in ballet from the age of five, studying dancing for the following nine years under the guidance of Debbie Allen. By the age of 12, she was a full-fledged employee of Mattel when she played Kirsten Larson and Kit Kittredge as part of Mattel's American Girl Dolls musical theater troupe.

She graduated from Long Beach Poly High School and attended college at the University of Southern California School of Dramatic Arts, where she earned a Bachelor of Fine Arts in acting in 2016. She participated in cheerleading at both schools.

== Career ==
In her first starring role, in The CW crime comedy-drama, In the Dark (2019–2022), she plays a blind woman. For this part, she learned skills for coping with blindness such as using a guide dog and sending text messages with voice commands. She shadowed a blind person, on whose life the show is based, to observe how she did ordinary things. Fans have reportedly believed that she was blind herself. Although the show has received criticism for not using an actual blind actress, the producer says she was "best for the role" despite having auditioned blind actresses.

Mattfeld next played an assistant football coach Erica "Ricky" Hudson in the comedy Chad Powers, which began airing on Hulu in September 2025. She described playing Hudson a "dream role" to The Hollywood Reporter because of her connection to football through cheerleading and through her husband, who is a former NFL player.

== Personal life ==
Mattfeld and former New York Jets quarterback Mark Sanchez got engaged in May 2022. The couple married in Oaxaca, Mexico, on May 28, 2023. Mattfeld gave birth to twin daughters with Sanchez in March 2025.

== Filmography ==
=== Film ===
List of films and roles
Year	Title	Role	Notes
2007	AmazoBoy!	Samantha	Short film
2011	The Girl in the Flammable Skirt	Aimee	Short film
2012	My Mind the Love Story	Alex	Short film
2022	A Little White Lie	Layla	Feature film
2022	Mending the Line	Lucy	Feature film
2022	Who Invited Them	Sasha	Feature film
2024	The Idea of You	Eva	Feature film
TBA	The 99'ers	Michelle Akers	Feature film

=== Television ===
List of television appearances and roles
Year	Title	Role	Notes
2008	The Norton Avenue All-Stars	Amanda Hammerschmidt 'The Hammer'	Television film
2009	Wizards of Waverly Place	FrankenGirl (Frankie Stein)	2 episodes
2011	4th and Forever	Herself - Cheerleader	4 episodes
2012	Secret Diary of an American Cheerleader	Suzie	Episode: "Angels in the Area"
2013	Escape from Polygamy	Bonnielee	Television film
2017	Stitchers	Monica Chamberlain	Episode: "Kill It Forward"
2017–2018	Shameless	Mel	Recurring role
2018	Homecoming	Makeover Associate	Episode: "Helping"
2019	Carrier	Pam	2 episodes
2019–2022	In the Dark	Murphy Mason	Lead role
2025	Long Bright River	Paula	Recurring role
2025–present	Chad Powers	Erica (Ricky) Hudson	Main role
