= Zack Pearlman =

American actor

- Born: Royal Oak, Michigan, US
- Occupation: Actor
- Years active: 2010–present

Zack Pearlman is an American actor. He is best known for his role as Zack in The Virginity Hit. He has co-starred in short-lived television comedies such as MTV's The Inbetweeners and on the Fox sitcom Mulaney. He also starred in the sketch Substitute Teacher (Key & Peele) from the show Key & Peele, portraying the student Aaron.

== Early life ==
Pearlman was born in Royal Oak, Michigan, the son of Susan (née Weldon) and Mark Pearlman. He is the third child in the family. He has two older siblings Aaron and Allie as well as a younger sister Hannah. Pearlman is of Jewish descent. He is a 2006 graduate of Pioneer High School (Ann Arbor, Michigan).

Growing up he was active in local Ann Arbor, Michigan, comedy and theatre.

== Career ==
Pearlman's acting career began after he submitted an entry for a contest with the website Funny or Die and was given the opportunity to audition for a role in the film The Virginity Hit. Pearlman landed a lead role in the film, which was released in September 2010. To increase the realism of the film, the directors gave Pearlman and his castmates cameras to film many of the scenes themselves. Pearlman began his television career as Leslie Kaczander in the season 1 finale of Breaking In. Pearlman played Jay in the American remake of the British series The Inbetweeners on MTV, but the series was cancelled after one season due to low viewership.

== Filmography ==
=== Film ===
Year	Title	Role
2010	The Virginity Hit	Zack
2014	Hot Bot	Leonard Stupenski
2015	Staten Island Summer	Frank
2015	The Intern	Davis
2015	Wrestling Isn't Wrestling	Theater Audience Member
2016	Why Him?	Kevin Dingle

=== Television ===
Year	Title	Role	Notes
2011	Breaking In	Leslie Kaczander	Episode: "21.0 Jump Street"
2012	Key and Peele	A-a-ron	Season 2, Episode 4
2012	The Inbetweeners	Jay	Series regular
2012	NTSF:SD:SUV::	Truman Biggle	Episode: "16 Hop Street"
2012–2018	DreamWorks Dragons	Snotlout	Voice role
2013	Workaholics	Pete	Episode: "Fourth and Inches"
2013	Community	Archie DeCoste	Episode: "Economics of Marine Biology"
2013	The Power Inside	Ari	Web series
2014–2015	Mulaney	Andre	Series regular
2016	Chicago Fire	Logan	Episode: "Two Ts"
2016–2017	Shameless	Neil Morton	Recurring role
2021–2022	The Chicken Squad	Snick	Recurring role
2023	Fantasy Island	Bobo	Episode: "Tara and Jessica's High School Reunion / Cat Lady"
