= Elliot Fletcher =

American actor (born 1995/1996)

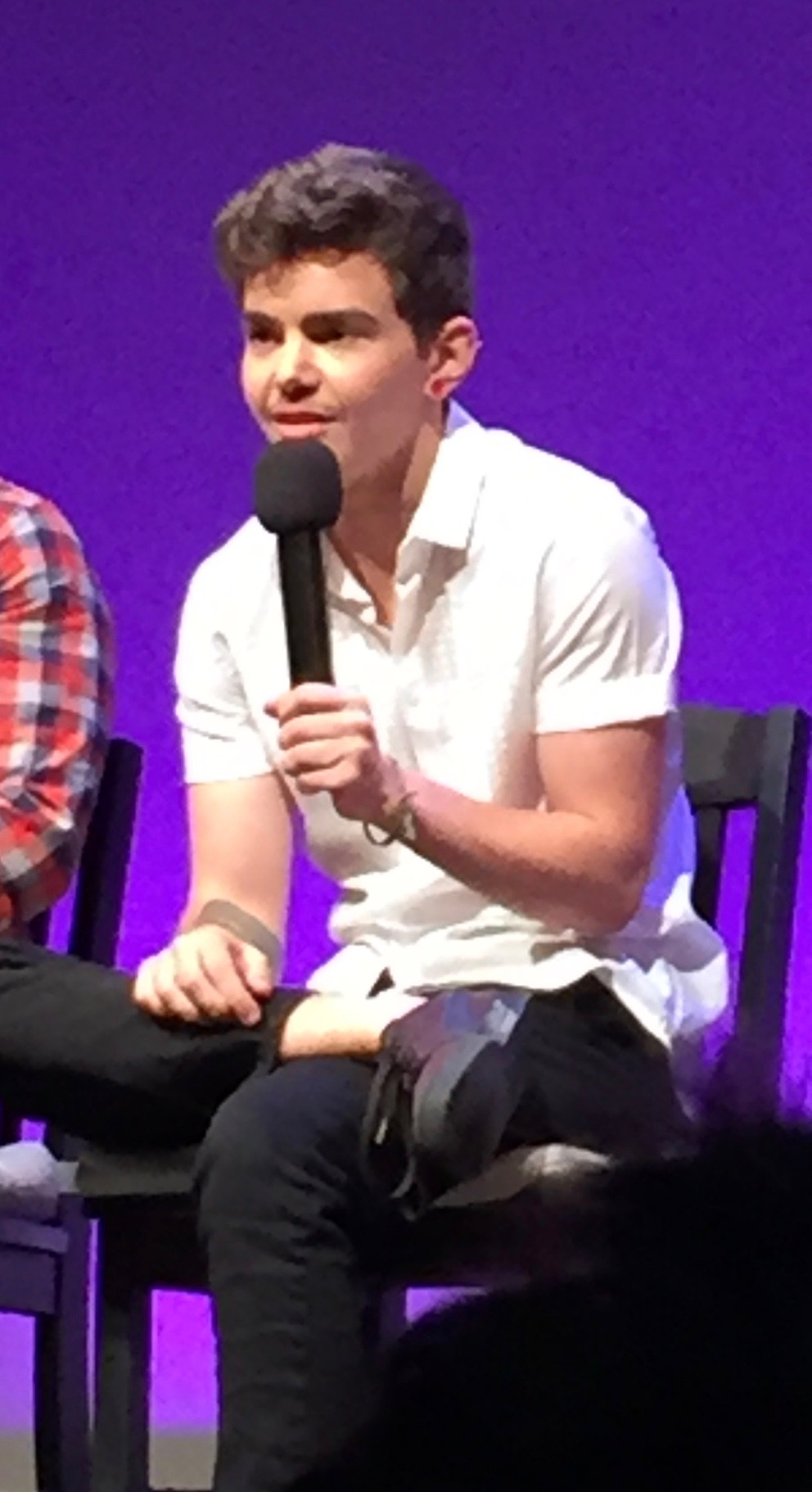
- Fletcher in 2016
- Born: 1995/1996 (age 30–31); Los Angeles, California, U.S.
- Education: Immaculate Heart High School
- Occupation: Actor
- Years active: 2007–present
- Parents: John DeMita (father); Julia Fletcher (mother)
- Relatives: Jack Fletcher (uncle)

Elliot Fletcher (born 1995 or 1996) is an American actor. He is known for his work in the MTV comedy series Faking It, Freeform's drama series The Fosters, and Showtime's series Shameless.

== Early life ==
Fletcher was born and raised in Los Angeles, California. He is one of two children born to Julia Fletcher DeMita and John DeMita, who are both voice actors. He has an older brother. Fletcher is a trans man who came out shortly after his 17th birthday. He subsequently began using the name Elliot and he/him pronouns.

== Career ==
Pre-transition, Fletcher voiced Shiro in the English dub of Tekkonkinkreet.

Fletcher joined the cast of Faking It as Noah in early 2016. In April 2016, the media announced that Fletcher would be joining the cast of The Fosters in a recurring guest-starring role as Aaron, an "attractive and intriguing law student" and potential romantic interest of Callie (Maia Mitchell). Fletcher originally considered auditioning for the role of Cole on The Fosters but decided against it. The role was later filled by Fletcher's close friend Tom Phelan.

Fletcher also appeared in season 7 and then became a recurring cast member in season 8 of the Showtime TV show Shameless. He plays Trevor, a trans man who works for an organization that helps find homes for runaways and homeless LGBTQ teens. He then befriends and gets into a relationship with Ian Gallagher.

In 2017, transgender actors and actresses including Fletcher (with the help of GLAAD and ScreenCrush) were part of a filmed letter to Hollywood written by Jen Richards, asking for more and improved roles for transgender people. In 2019, Fletcher played the character Max in multiple episodes of the third and final season of the Hulu original series Marvel's Runaways.

In 2020, Fletcher was added to the main cast of the post-apocalyptic FX on Hulu show Y: The Last Man. Fletcher's character, Sam Jordan, is a transgender man navigating a world without cisgender men.

== Filmography ==
Elliot Fletcher television roles
Year	Title	Role	Notes
2016	Faking It	Noah	Recurring role (season 3)
2016–2018	The Fosters	Aaron	Recurring role (seasons 4–5)
2016–2018	Shameless	Trevor	Recurring role (seasons 7–8)
2019	Adam Ruins Everything	Jack	1 episode
2019	Runaways	Max	1 episode
2020	Disclosure: Trans Lives on Screen	Himself	Documentary film
2021	Tell Me Your Secrets	Jake Barlow	
2021	Y: The Last Man	Sam Jordan	Main cast
2022	The Sex Lives of College Girls	Reporter	1 episode

Elliot Fletcher voice performances
Year	Title	Role	Notes
2006	Tekkonkinkreet	Shiro (voice)	English dub
2020	World of Warcraft: Shadowlands	Pelagos (voice)	Kyrian/Bastion Campaign Companion
2022	Drifting Home	Noppo (voice)	English dub
