= Scott Michael Campbell =

American actor (born 1971)

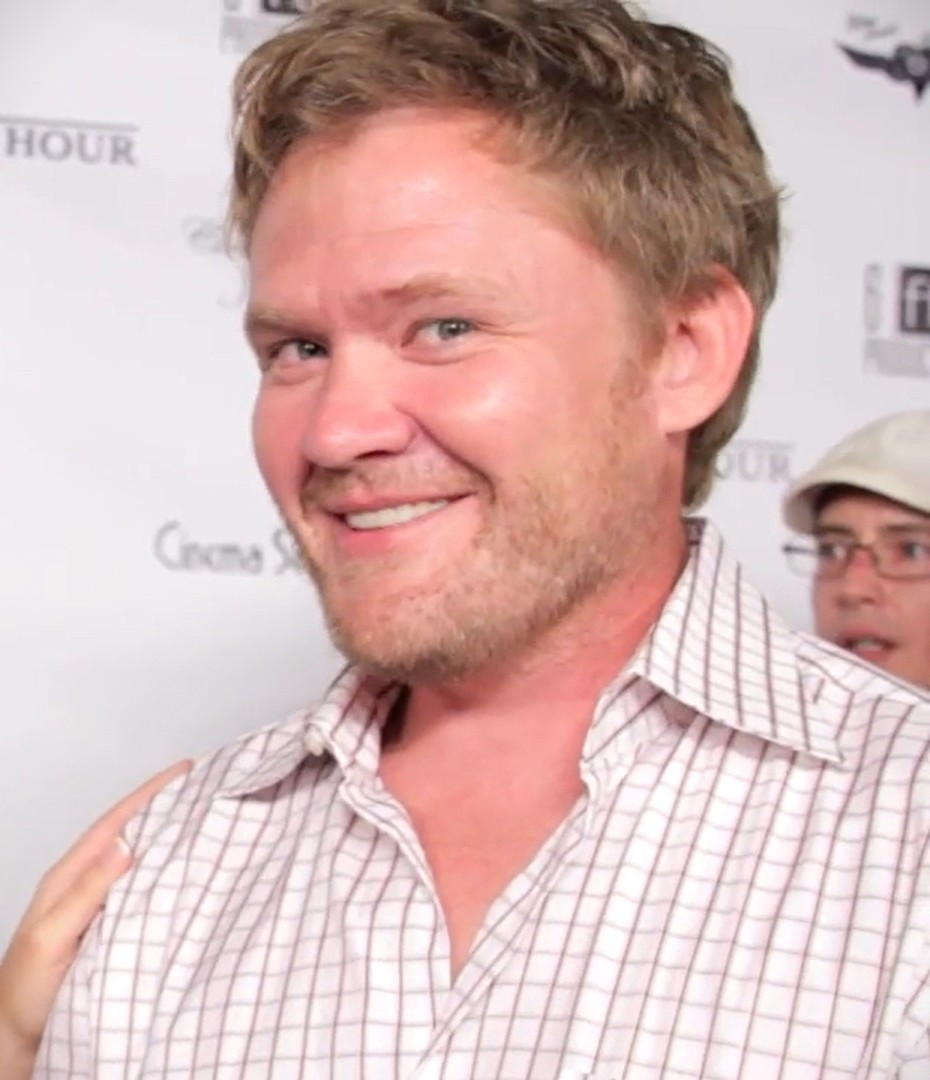
- Campbell in 2013
- Born: August 14, 1971 (age 55); Missoula, Montana, U.S.
- Education: American Academy of Dramatic Arts
- Occupations: Actor; writer; producer; director
- Years active: 1992–present
- Spouse: Heather McComb (m. 2026)

Scott Michael Campbell (born August 14, 1971) is an American actor, writer, producer and director. Campbell is best known from his roles in Brokeback Mountain, Push and Flight of the Phoenix. Among the roles he has played (many of them as a guest star in TV shows), there are recurring appearances in ER, Nothing Sacred, House, and Shameless, and the Apple TV+ original science fiction space drama series For All Mankind.

== Early life ==
Campbell was born August 14, 1971, in Missoula, Montana. He graduated from American Academy of Dramatic Arts (Pasadena, California) in 1991.

== Career ==
=== 1992–present: Guest starring ===
His first onscreen appearance was on the television series The Torkelsons in 1992, where he played a jock. He appeared in small roles before appearing as a guest star in Sisters in 1993 where he played Conifer in the episode "Demons". He continued to make small appearances on television shows and movies before making his big screen debut as Billy in the George Lucas produced Radioland Murders in 1994. Campbell appeared in four episodes of Christy from 1994 to 1995. Campbell continued his work in television with a multi-episode arc as EMT Riley Brown on the hit NBC drama, ER.

This was followed up with more small roles in shows like Frasier, Chicago Hope and The West Wing. He was cast as a series regular for the show Nothing Sacred, but the show only lasted one season, and the five remaining episodes were never aired. Campbell later appeared in the 2004 remake of Flight of the Phoenix with Dennis Quaid, Giovanni Ribisi, the Oscar-nominated Brokeback Mountain (2005), as well as the superhero flick Push (2009) with Dakota Fanning.

Campbell continued to work in television with bit roles in 24, House M.D., Grey's Anatomy and Criminal Minds. In 2010, he played a recurring role as Justin Murphy on The Event. In 2013, he appeared in the film A Good Day to Die Hard starring Bruce Willis and Jai Courtney. He starred in The Marriage Pact, and continued with guest starring on multiple shows, such as Resurrection, Wayward Pines and NCIS: New Orleans. Campbell guest starred in the fifth season mid-season finale of Suits where he played Father Sam Walker.

=== 2009–2011: Producing and directing ===
Campbell has produced and directed several short films, the first in 2009 with Waiting for Jevetta which he co-directed and produced with Judith Benezra. In 2010, he produced the short film The Riverside Shuffle. In 2011, Campbell co-produced and co-directed the short films Shooting for Tomorrow, Shooting for Something Else and Tomorrow's End. Campbell received multiple awards for the short films Shooting for Tomorrow and Shooting for Something Else, including the categories Best Short Film, Best Short Film and Best Experimental Short. Shooting for Tomorrow won Best Short Film at the Los Angeles Film Festival.

== Personal life ==
Campbell married actress Heather McComb on May 30, 2026.

== Filmography ==
=== Producer ===
Year	Title	Role	Notes
2009	Waiting for Jevetta	Producer, director	
2010	The Riverside Shuffle	Producer	
2011	Shooting for Tomorrow	Producer, director	Nominated–Los Angeles Film Festival for Narrative Competition; Won–Los Angeles Film Festival for Best Short Film; Won–The 48 Hour Film Project Award for Best Film
2011	Shooting for Something Else	Producer, director	Won–Los Angeles First Glance Film Festival Award for Best Director; Won–Los Angeles First Glance Film Festival Award for Best Short Film; Won–Los Angeles Movie Awards for Best Experimental Short; Won–Missoula International Wildlife Film Festival with Merit Award for Script
2011	Tomorrow's End	Producer, director	

=== Films ===
Year	Title	Role	Notes
1993	The Flood: Who Will Save Our Children?	Mike Smith	Television film
1994	Radioland Murders	Billy	
1995	Fair Game	Adam	
1997	Flubber	Dale Jepner	
1998	Bulworth	Head Valet	
2002	Hart's War	Cpl. Joe S. Cromin	
2004	Flight of the Phoenix	James Liddle	
2005	Brokeback Mountain	Monroe	
2006	A Guide to Recognizing Your Saints	Nerf	Credited as Scott Campbell
2006	Mystery Woman: At First Sight	Sheriff Powell	Television film
2007	Brothers Three: An American Gothic	Norman	
2007	Cougar Club	Mr. Conrad	
2007	Throwing Stars	Laith	
2007	Crazy	Billy Byrd	
2009	The Smell of Success	Mr. Diehl	
2009	Push	Agent Holden	
2009	Stay Cool	Officer Bird	
2010	Small Town Saturday Night	Dwayne Murphy	
2011	The Perfect Family	Father Joe	
2011	Cornered	Carlin	
2011	Tomorrow's End	Scott	
2012	Ticket Out	Miller	
2012	War Flowers	Tim	
2013	A Good Day to Die Hard	Campbell	
2014	The Wedding Pact	Jake Jones	

=== Television ===
Year	Title	Role	Notes
1992	The Torkelsons	Big Jock	Episode: "The Ice Princess"
1992	Life Goes On	Kid	Episode: "The Wall"
1992	Evening Shade	Brian	Episode: "You Scratch My Back, I'll Arrest You"
1993	Bodies of Evidence	Conner	Episode: "Eleven Grains of Sand"
1993	Sisters	Conifer	Episode: "Demons"
1994	Birdland	Greg Kissler	1 episode
1994	L.A. Law	Brian Conley	Episode: "The Age of Insolence"
1994–1995	Christy	Lundy Taylor	Guest star (4 episodes)
1995	Women of the House	Kevin	Episode: "Guess Who's Sleeping in Lincoln's Bed?"
1995	Living Single	Pug	2 episodes
1996	Seduced by Madness: the Diane Borchardt Story	Cory	TV Mini-Series (2 episodes)
1996	The Jeff Foxworthy Show	Leonord John Colepepper	Episode: "He Ain't Heavy, He's a Bully
1996	ER	EMT Dr. Riley Brown	Recurring role (7 episodes)
1997	Crisis Center	Brian	Episode: "The Center"
1997–1998	Nothing Sacred	Father Eric	Series regular (20 episodes)
1998	Frasier	Mr. Rugley	Episode: "Frasier's Curse"
1999	Chicago Hope	Justin Trager	Episode: "Big Hand for the Little Lady"
2000	Bull	Chris Sherman	Episode: "A Wink and a Nod"
2001	The West Wing	Donald Dolan	Episode: "On the Day Before"
2001	Crossing Jordan	Officer John Hardwick	"Blue Christmas"
2005	Blind Justice	Jeff Dorsey	Episode: "Seoul Man"
2005	Grey's Anatomy	Mr. Hubble	Episode: "Enough is Enough"
2006	House M.D.	Joe Luria	2 episodes
2006	CSI: Crime Scene Investigation	Union Soldier	Episodes: "Way to Go"
2006	Psych	Wes Hildenbach	Episode: "9 Lives"
2006	NCIS	Robert Miller	Episode: "Witch Hunt"
2006	Gilmore Girls	Harvey Tunnell	Episode: "Go, Bulldogs!"
2006	Standoff	Graham Brewster	Episode: "Heroine"
2007	Shark	Tommy Callison	Episode: "Wayne's World"
2007	Cold Case	Tom 'Z' Zimmerman (1981)	Episode: "Blood on the Tracks"
2007	24	Brady Hauser	Episode: "Day 6: 8:00 p.m.-9:00 p.m."
2007	Boston Legal	Neill	Episode: "Brotherly Love"
2007	Burn Notice	Jake Miller	Episode: "Family Business"
2007	Journeyman	Michael	1 episode
2008	Criminal Minds	Peter Redding	1 episode
2008	The Shield	Jeff Busada	1 episode
2008	Life	Detective Henry Villanon	1 episode ("Not for Nothing")
2008	Private Practice	Gregory	1 episode
2009	Supernatural	Tim	1 episode
2010	CSI: Miami	Phillip Hale	Episode: "In the Wind"
2010	The Forgotten	William Hollander	Episode: "Donovan Doe"
2010	Drop Dead Diva	Mike Barry	1 episode
2010	Bones	Gary Nesbitt	1 episode
2010	The Event	Justin Murphy	Recurring role (5 episodes)
2011	Castle	Lee Travis	Episode: "Kill Shot"
2011	Dexter	Norm	Episode: "Nebraska"
2012	Daybreak	Frank	2 episodes
2014	Masters of Sex	Roger Corwin	1 episode
2014	Resurrection	Arthur Holmes	1 episode
2014	Stalker	Eddie Gaines	Episode: "Fanatic"
2014–2017	Longmire	Dr. Weston	Recurring role (7 episodes)
2015	Supergirl	Ethan Knox	Episode: “How Does She Do it?”
2015	Wayward Pines	Wayne Johnson	2 episodes
2015	Suits	Father Sam Walker	5 episodes
2016–2019	Shameless	Brad	20 episodes
2018	Unsolved	Officer Tim "Blondie" Brennan	5 episodes
2021	This Is Us	Sheehan	Episode: One Small Step...
2021–2022	For All Mankind	Alex Rossi	6 episodes
2022	Under the Banner of Heaven	Brigham Young	Miniseries, supporting role
2026	Ted	Bernie Bennett	Episode: Talk Dirty to Me

== Awards and nominations ==
Year	Award	Category	Work	Result
2011
2011	Los Angeles Film Festival	Best Short Film	Shooting for Tomorrow (with co-producer Hunter G. Williams)	Won
2011	Los Angeles Film Festival	Narrative Competition	Shooting for Tomorrow (with co-producer Hunter G. Williams)	Nominated
2011	Los Angeles First Glance Film Festival	Best Director	Shooting for Something Else (with co-producer Hunter G. Williams)	Won
2011	Los Angeles First Glance Film Festival	Best Short Film	Shooting for Something Else (with co-producer Hunter G. Williams)	Won
2011	Los Angeles Movie Awards	Best Experimental Short	Shooting for Something Else (with co-producer Hunter G. Williams)	Won
2011	The 48 Hour Film Project, Los Angeles	Best Film	Shooting for Tomorrow (with co-producer Hunter G. Williams)	Won
2012	Missoula International Wildlife Film Festival	Merit Award for Script	Shooting for Something Else (with co-producer Hunter G. Williams)	Won
