= Ruby Modine =

American actress and singer (born 1990)

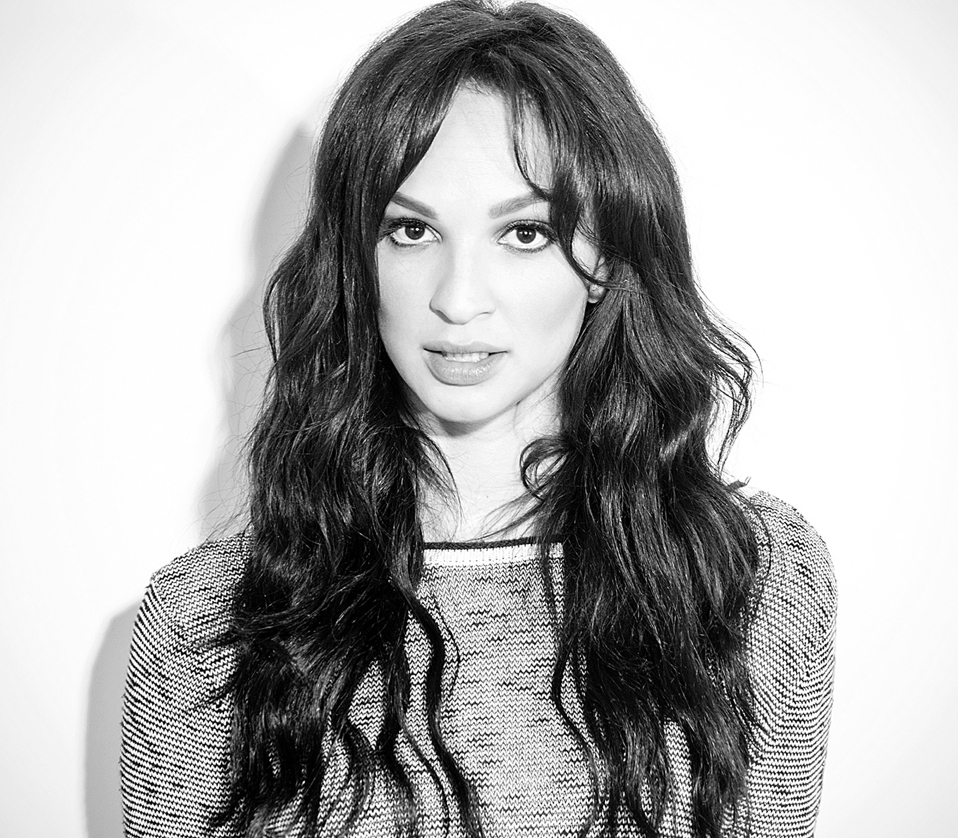
- Modine in 2017
- Born: Ruby Wylder Rivera Modine; July 31, 1990 (age 36); Los Angeles, California, U.S.
- Occupations: Actress; singer
- Years active: 2007–present
- Television: Shameless
- Father: Matthew Modine
- Website: rubywyldermodine.com

Ruby Wylder Rivera Modine (born July 31, 1990) is an American actress and singer. She is best known for playing Sierra Morton in Shameless. She also co-starred in the 2017 slasher film Happy Death Day, as well as in its sequel as Lori Spengler. She is the lead singer of the band Ruby Modine and the Disease.

== Early life ==
Modine was born on July 31, 1990, in Los Angeles, California, to Caridad Rivera, a makeup and wardrobe stylist, and Matthew Modine, an actor. Her mother is Puerto Rican. She has a brother, Boman, who works as an assistant director.

== Career ==
Modine was cast as Sierra in the seventh season of Shameless. On November 8, 2016, she was cast to co-star in the slasher film Happy Death Day starring Jessica Rothe and Israel Broussard. The film opened in 2017, to positive reviews. Modine reprised her role in the 2019 sequel, Happy Death Day 2U.

== Filmography ==
=== Film ===
Year	Title	Role	Notes
2008	Mia and the Migoo	Girl on Bridge (voice)	
2012	Somebody	Somebody	Short
2016	Super Sex	Julie	Short
2017	Central Park	Sessa	
2017	Happy Death Day	Lori Spengler	
2019	Happy Death Day 2U	Lori Spengler	
2019	Satanic Panic	Judi Ross	
2021	The Survivalist	Sarah Street	
2021	On Our Way	Lily	
2022	My Love Affair with Marriage	Nina (voice)	
2022	Americana	Lily-Rose	Short
2023	Fear	Serena	
2025	Silent Night, Deadly Night	Pamela "Pam" Sims	

=== Television ===
Year	Title	Role	Notes
2015	Gypsi	Eden LeCroix	2 episodes
2016–2018	Shameless	Sierra Morton	21 episodes
2020	God Friended Me	Anna	1 episode
2022	The Exodite	Lako'ma	3 episodes
