= Emma Kenney =

American actress (born 1999)

- Born: Emma Rose Kenney; September 14, 1999 (age 26); New York City, New York, U.S.
- Occupation: Actress
- Years active: 2008–present

Emma Rose Kenney (born September 14, 1999) is an American actress. She is known for playing Debbie Gallagher on Shameless, and Harris Conner-Healy in the tenth season of Roseanne and its spin-off, The Conners.

== Early life ==
Kenney was born on September 14, 1999, in New York City. Her parents are Gillian Kenney, a criminal defense lawyer, and Kevin Kenney, a sports writer who formerly wrote for the New York Post and now works for Fox Sports. She has been a resident of Fanwood, New Jersey.

== Career ==
Kenney made several appearances in short and made-for-television films. In 2009, at nine years old, she was the youngest filmmaker to be a finalist at the New Jersey International Film Festival at Rutgers University.

Kenney appeared as Debbie Gallagher, the on-air daughter of William H. Macy in the comedic drama Shameless. Kenney won the role at 10 years old, while attending Park Middle School in Scotch Plains, New Jersey.

In September 2017, it was announced that Kenney would appear in the 10th season of Roseanne, which served as a revival of the series and premiered on ABC on March 27, 2018. She portrays Harris Conner Healy, the granddaughter of the sitcom's titular character. Kenney appeared alongside many of the show's original cast members, including Roseanne Barr, John Goodman, Laurie Metcalf, and Sara Gilbert, with Gilbert portraying her TV mother, Darlene Conner Healy. On May 29, 2018, ABC cancelled the revival after one season.

ABC subsequently ordered a Roseanne spin-off called The Conners, which would not include Roseanne Barr, but would retain the remaining main cast, including Kenney. The Conners premiered on October 16, 2018, and eventually concluded after airing for seven seasons on April 23, 2025.

== Personal life ==
In 2024, Kenney began a relationship with Conrad Hughes Hilton III, a businessman and heir to the Hilton family legacy. He is the son of Richard Hilton and Kathy Hilton and the younger brother of Paris Hilton and Nicky Hilton.

== Filmography ==
=== Film ===
Year	Title	Role	Notes
2008	Lyre Liar	Daughter	Short film
2008	Bittersweet	Emma	
2009	A (Not So) Civil Union	Young Jo	Short film
2009	Three Little Puppets	Nicole	Short film
2013	Epic	Marigold Girl (voice)	
2019	Robert the Bruce	Briana	
2022	Murder at Yellowstone City	Rebecca Davies	
2022	My Love Affair with Marriage	Sarma (voice)	

=== Television ===
Year	Title	Role	Notes
2009	Green Apples	Abigail	Television film
2009	Day Camp	Rosie Rivette	Television film
2011	Boardwalk Empire	Aylesh Rohan	Episode: "Peg of Old"
2011–2021	Shameless	Debbie Gallagher	Main role
2018	Roseanne	Harris Conner-Healy	Main role (season 10)
2018–2025	The Conners	Harris Conner-Healy	Main role
2025	Happy's Place	Gracie McAllister	Episode: "The MacAllister Girls"
