= Shameless season 4 =

Shameless
- Season 4
- DVD cover
- Showrunner: John Wells
- Starring: William H. Macy; Emmy Rossum; Jeremy Allen White; Ethan Cutkosky; Shanola Hampton; Steve Howey; Emma Kenney; Cameron Monaghan; Joan Cusack; Noel Fisher; Emma Greenwell; Jake McDorman
- No. of episodes: 12

Release
- Original network: Showtime
- Original release: January 12 – April 6, 2014

Season chronology
- ← Previous; Season 3 Next → Season 5

The fourth season of Shameless, an American comedy-drama television series based on the British series of the same name by Paul Abbott, premiered on January 12, 2014, at Sunday 9:00 p.m. EST on the Showtime television network. Executive producers are John Wells, Paul Abbott and Andrew Stearn, with producer Michael Hissrich. The season concluded after 12 episodes on April 6, 2014. The show's season premiere brought in 1.69 million viewers, while the episode airing February 2, "Strangers on a Train", received 1.22 million total viewers, its lowest-rated episode of the season. The season finale scored 1.93 million viewers, becoming the show's highest-rated episode for the season.

== Plot ==
Unlike previous seasons, the fourth season of Shameless begins shifting into a darker tone, with the season's core stories mainly revolving around Fiona's sudden trouble with the law and Frank's possible death. At the beginning of the season, Fiona is getting past the disappearance of Jimmy and adjusting to her new job at Worldwide Cup. Keeping the family afloat, she has begun dating her boss, Mike Pratt (Jake McDorman).

Other characters' lives have shifted: Lip no longer lives at the house, struggling to adjust to new life at Chicago Polytechnic. Sheila finds solace in online dating, and she meets a Native American cowboy that takes care of his junkie sister's five children. Stan, the owner of The Alibi Room, dies, so Kevin gets full ownership of the bar. Veronica is pregnant with triplets, though her surrogate mother Carol is also pregnant. After Carol gives birth, Carol decides she wants to raise the baby on her own. Debbie begins pining after an older boy, Matt (James Allen McCune). Mickey is depressed over the disappearance of Ian, and he has a strained relationship with his pregnant wife, Svetlana. Mickey eventually tracks down Ian, who has gone AWOL from the Army and now works at a sketchy gay bar with a new, odd behavior. Knowing that her husband is spending time with Ian, Svetlana begins to extort money from Mickey. During an after-party for his son's christening at the Alibi, Mickey publicly comes out. Terry tries to attack Mickey over the revelation, resulting in his arrest; the other Alibi regulars seem accepting of Mickey's sexuality.

Frank, in declining health, is returned home by the police, to most of the family's dismay. Forced to stay on the wagon, Frank is desperate for a new liver and reveals the existence of his oldest child, Sammi (Emily Bergl). To his surprise, Frank tracks Sammi down and discovers that he has a grandson, Chuckie. Frank makes a good impression on Sammi, who does not know that Frank is her father. Sammi is initially furious when she finds out the truth, but she eventually reconciles with Frank, wanting to begin a father/daughter relationship with him. Though she isn't a viable liver donor, Sammi cares for Frank as his health begins to deteriorate. Sheila, wanting to adopt her online boyfriend's kids, marries Frank to increase her chances of winning custody, though she ultimately fails to do so. Frank is eventually given a last-minute liver transplant after being moved up the hospital's waiting list.

Fiona's life is drastically turned upside down on her birthday. Against her better judgment, Fiona pursues a secret affair with Mike's brother, Robbie. Mike is devastated when he learns the truth, punching Robbie in the face and breaking up with Fiona. On the day of her birthday, Fiona is gifted a baggie of cocaine from Robbie. That night, Fiona throws a party and snorts the cocaine; Liam gets into the stash of cocaine and is found unconscious in the kitchen. As the family rushes Liam to the hospital, Fiona is arrested and lands in county jail; she refuses to give up Robbie's name. Originally put on house arrest, Fiona goes on a bender with Robbie's friends and breaks her curfew. She is sent to a correctional facility for a 90-day sentence, wreaking havoc for the rest of the family.

Fiona's arrest leaves parental duties on Lip. Some unexpected assistance comes from an intelligent college student, Amanda (Nichole Bloom), whom Lip eventually begins dating. Lip begins to put his previous relationship with Mandy behind him; Mandy is stuck in an abusive relationship with her boyfriend, Kenyatta. Ian finally turns up and reunites with his family, but his new behavior concerns Mickey and the family, who compare Ian's odd behavior to Monica's bipolar disorder.

Fiona gets an early release from the correctional facility due to overcrowding. Thanks to her parole officer, Fiona gets a job as a waitress at the Golden House Restaurant, a diner managed by Charlie Peters (Jeffrey Dean Morgan). Frank is back to drinking with his new liver and has simultaneously brought Sammi and Chuckie into the Gallaghers' lives. Mickey and Svetlana come to an understanding of how to raise their child. During the final episode, a post-credits scene reveals Jimmy, who has been absent the whole season, watching the Gallagher home from his car with an unnamed woman.

== Cast and characters ==
=== Regular ===
- William H. Macy as Frank Gallagher
- Emmy Rossum as Fiona Gallagher
- Jeremy Allen White as Philip "Lip" Gallagher
- Ethan Cutkosky as Carl Gallagher
- Shanola Hampton as Veronica "V" Fisher
- Steve Howey as Kevin "Kev" Ball
- Emma Kenney as Debbie Gallagher
- Cameron Monaghan as Ian Gallagher
- Noel Fisher as Mickey Milkovich
- Emma Greenwell as Mandy Milkovich
- Jake McDorman as Mike Pratt

=== Special guest star ===
- Joan Cusack as Sheila Jackson

=== Special guest ===
- Emily Bergl as Samantha "Sammi" Slott
- Regina King as Gail Johnson
- Jeffrey Dean Morgan as Charlie Peters
- Justin Chatwin as Steve Wilton / Jimmy Lishman

=== Recurring ===
- Michael Patrick McGill as Tommy
- Dennis Cockrum as Terry Milkovich
- Jim Hoffmaster as Kermit
- Vanessa Bell Calloway as Carol Fisher
- Danika Yarosh as Holly Herkimer
- Isidora Goreshter as Svetlana Yevgenivna
- Maile Flanagan as Connie
- Shel Bailey as Kenyatta
- James Allen McCune as Matty Baker
- Adam Cagley as Ron Kuzner
- Lynn Ann Leveridge as Nancy Pratt
- Kate Cobb as Jane Pratt
- Nichole Bloom as Amanda
- Steven M. Gagnon as Bill Pratt
- Rene Moran as Jairo
- Teresa Ornelas as Ellie
- Abram Teunissen as Wolf
- Kellen Michael as Chuckie Slott
- Nick Gehlfuss as Robbie Pratt
- Eloy Casados as Roger Runningtree
- Miguel Izaguirre as Paco
- Izabella Alvarez as Sarah
- Tai Urban as Gary
- Morgan Lily as Bonnie

=== Guests ===
- Kerry O'Malley as Kate
- Jack Carter as Stan Kopchek
- Tyler Jacob Moore as Tony Markovich
- Harry Hamlin as Lloyd 'Ned' Lishman
- Bill Brochtrup as Hal
- Alessandra Ford Balazs as Jackie Scabello
- Joe Adler as Colin Milkovich
- Alex Borstein as Lou Deckner
- Johanna Braddy as Shelley
- Scott Grimes as Dr. Zabel
- Lisa Vidal as Maria Vidal
- Ian Kahn as Jason
- Suzanne Cryer as Cheryl
- Dichen Lachman as Angela

== Episodes ==
No. overall	No. in season	Title	Directed by	Written by	Original release date	US viewers (millions)
37	1	"Simple Pleasures"	John Wells	John Wells	January 12, 2014	1.69
Fiona has been working at Worldwide Cup for three months, while also semi-dating Mike. Debbie is starting to blossom, physically and emotionally, and she befriends an older pizza-delivering bachelor, Matt. Lip begins classes at Chicago Polytechnic, living on campus and working in the cafeteria. Feeling lonely, Sheila regularly visits the Gallagher house to babysit and clean. Frank is found by the police nearly unconscious in a drug house, and he is returned home to his family. Fiona refuses to let Frank stay, but relents when Carl insists. Frank shows Carl that he is physically addicted to alcohol, but coughs blood when he drinks it. Mickey is bored with his soulless marriage to Svetlana and is depressed over Ian's disappearance. Carl starts to have nocturnal emissions, and Frank teaches him about masturbation before sleep to avoid this. Veronica discovers she is pregnant and informs Kevin. Lip gets a D on his English paper and confronts the grader; Lip is told that he needs to work harder, or change his course at college. Fiona has sex with Mike for the first time, but she doesn't seem satisfied by it.
38	2	"My Oldest Daughter"	Mimi Leder	Nancy M. Pimental	January 19, 2014	1.60
Fiona begins to enjoy the perks of living life just above the poverty line, using her newly activated health benefits to take the kids for checkups. However, when a road rage incident damages the company car, Fiona lies to Mike about how it happened, causing Mike to confront Fiona about the importance of trust in their relationship. Lip seems to have lost his mojo as he struggles in school and with the ladies. Upon learning that Matt is twenty years old, Debbie tells him that she is thirteen; Matt seems fine with Debbie's age and continues their friendship. After Stan, the owner of the Alibi, passes away, Kevin discovers that Stan had left the bar in his will, fulfilling his dream. However, Kevin finds out that the bar is in deep debt. Veronica turns out to be pregnant with triplets. Fiona refuses to be a liver donor for Frank, despite Carl's pleas. Frank tells Fiona that he will go to his older daughter, Samantha, for help.
39	3	"Like Father, Like Daughter"	Sanaa Hamri	Sheila Callaghan	January 26, 2014	1.83
Fiona has dinner with Mike's family and meets his drug addict brother, Robbie. Sheila begins experimenting with online dating. In an attempt to raise money for Frank, Carl steals various dogs around the neighborhood and holds them ransom. Lip continues to struggle in college, arriving late at work and classes. A disheartened Mickey tries to mask his pain with alcohol and sex. In preparation for their four children, Veronica and Kevin desperately try to make more money by selling drugs at the Alibi. Frank stalks his eldest daughter Sammi, who does not know of their relation, and discovers that he has a grandson, Chuckie. Frank makes a good impression on Sammi and bonds with her over multiple days; Sammi ultimately offers to donate her liver, but also reveals romantic interest in Frank. Debbie is turned down when she tries to have sex with Matt. Mike, Fiona and Robbie go out for another dinner; Fiona and Robbie have an intimate conversation about addiction. At Mike's house, Fiona has sex with Robbie while Mike is passed out.
40	4	"Strangers on a Train"	Peter Segal	Etan Frankel	February 2, 2014	1.22
Frank continues to bond with Sammi and discovers that a transplant costs $150,000 because he has no insurance; Carl successfully breaks Frank's leg in order to give Frank a large insurance payout. Mickey, angered by how little Svetlana is being paid, tells her and all the other prostitutes not to work until they are paid more by their employer. Mickey's efforts prove unsuccessful when the women are replaced within a matter of hours. Lip goes on a destructive rampage when he is denied the opportunity to take one of his midterms. He and Mandy briefly reignite their former flame, but it quickly ends in a fight. Fiona visits Robbie to end their affair, but she succumbs to Robbie's seductive nature; the pair are almost caught by Mike. Sammi tells Frank that she isn't a viable donor, and an angry Frank accidentally reveals that he is her father. Sammi furiously throws him out, but she eventually reconciles with Frank, warming up to the idea of having a father. Lip returns to college and is granted a retest.
41	5	"There's the Rub"	David Nutter	Davey Holmes	February 9, 2014	1.58
At college, Lip is surprised by two military officers who claim that his identity has been stolen; they show him a photograph of Ian. Fiona ends things with Robbie. When Fiona visits Mike's family, Mike and Robbie get into an argument, during which Robbie reveals his tryst with Fiona. Stunned, Mike punches Robbie in the face and breaks up with Fiona. Fiona awkwardly returns to work the following day and apologizes to Mike, who transfers her to another position so they do not work directly. Kevin and Mickey open a brothel in the apartment above the bar. Frank is told that the claim for his broken leg will take a year to process. Desperate for a cure, Frank gets Sheila's new boyfriend, Roger, to build a sweat lodge to rid his body of toxins. Lip and Debbie search for Ian and track him down to a gay bar, but he isn't behaving normally and dodges all of their questions. Robbie surprises Fiona at her house with cocaine, but she chases him out. Fiona later throws a birthday party and snorts the cocaine; Liam accidentally consumes the cocaine and is found unconscious in the kitchen.
42	6	"Iron City"	James Ponsoldt	John Wells	February 16, 2014	1.90
Liam's accidental cocaine ingestion lands Fiona in county jail, where she experiences the wrongs of her actions. After getting the prognosis on Liam's condition, Lip blames Fiona for her lack of responsibility and disregards Fiona's attempts to be a guardian again. Debbie runs off to Matt's apartment to find solace, while Lip asks Mandy to find Ian and inform him of Liam's condition. After fainting in the sweat lodge, Frank gets sobering news from his doctor, who tells him he doesn't have much time left to live. Forced to face his own mortality, Frank strongly refuses when Sammi tries to convince him to consider hospice care. Sheila enjoys spending time with Roger's family, but is forced to say goodbye as they prepare to leave for their reservation. Experiencing an empty nest again, a lonely Sheila packs her bags and leaves to join their reservation. Fiona gets bailed out of jail by Mike, who doesn't ever want to see her again. Sammi meets her half-siblings as they visit a recovered Liam in the hospital.
43	7	"A Jailbird, Invalid, Martyr, Cutter, Retard and Parasitic Twin"	Gary B. Goldman	Nancy M. Pimental	February 23, 2014	1.89
Guardianship duties fall upon Lip, who attempts to make the house more presentable for the social worker's surprise visit. He gets some unexpected assistance from his roommate's girlfriend, Amanda, who offers to babysit Liam during his classes. After being pressured by Mandy, Mickey searches for Ian and finds him at a gay bar, passed out from drugs. Mickey brings Ian back to the Milkovich home, upsetting Svetlana. Debbie is once again rebuffed by Matt, who tells her that she is too young. Fiona sees her public defender, who reveals that she may serve some time if she pleads guilty. Fiona expresses interest in taking the case to trial, prompting a nasty argument with Lip over the incident with Liam. After the bar is robbed, Kevin gets a gun for protection. Veronica loses one of her triplets through fetal resorption. At the Gallagher home, Sammi gives Frank hard drugs for his pain, prompting Lip to kick her and Frank out. At her hearing, Fiona pleads guilty; she is given house arrest and is charged as a felon.
44	8	"Hope Springs Paternal"	Mimi Leder	Sheila Callaghan	March 9, 2014	1.77
In preparation for a visit from her probation officer, Fiona must remove all contraband from the house, putting her at odds with Debbie and Carl. Ian is kicked out of Mickey's house by Svetlana, who feels threatened by his presence. Ian then returns to the Gallagher house, and Mickey and Ian rekindle their relationship. Svetlana gives birth, but Mickey is uninterested in visiting her. Sammi and Frank pretend to sell Sheila's house in order to earn money for Frank's transplant. Debbie finds solace in Sammi, who helps guide Debbie through her first period. Carl is suspended from school due to his constant bullying. Carol gives birth, but she wants to keep the baby. Though Kevin is disappointed, Veronica convinces him to agree. Robbie visits Fiona to apologize, but Fiona slams the door in his face. Lip comes home to find a drunken Fiona, resulting in him taking Liam to his dorm so she can figure things out. After having an emotional breakdown over Liam, Fiona calls Lip and proclaims she wants her family back. At the end of the episode, Lip reconciles with Fiona by letting her hold Liam.
45	9	"The Legend of Bonnie and Carl"	Mark Mylod	Etan Frankel	March 16, 2014	1.70
Carl connects with a girl named Bonnie; they appear to have the same interests for recklessness and violence. After discovering that Matt is dating someone else, Debbie stalks his new girlfriend. Amanda tries to seduce Lip, which he tries to resist, as she is dating his roommate. Sheila returns from the reservation, and she discovers Frank in dire health. Sheila reveals that Roger was abusive, and expresses interest in adopting his kids. Sammi brings Frank's wish of visiting the Alibi to him. Fiona struggles to find a job as part of her probation, as the employers are uneasy about hiring a felon. Fiona later returns to Worldwide Cup, but is publicly berated by Mike's sister in front of the entire office. Ashamed, Fiona angrily confronts Robbie for ruining her life. Mickey continues to spend time with Ian while ignoring Svetlana and his child. Svetlana wants Mickey to help take care of their child and extorts money from Mickey, threatening to tell Terry about Ian if Mickey does not comply. Mandy's boyfriend, Kenyatta, hunts down Lip after discovering he and Mandy had sex. Mickey later discovers Mandy having been beaten by Kenyatta.
46	10	"Liver, I Hardly Know Her"	Christopher Chulack	Davey Holmes	March 23, 2014	1.63
Immediately following her confrontation with Robbie, Fiona spirals out of control and goes on a binge, partaking heavily in narcotics and alcohol. Waking up periodically, Fiona regains coherence in a gas station in Sheboygan, where the people she was riding with strand her there. The Gallaghers go into search mode to find her, applying the methods they use to find Frank when he disappears. Lip eventually finds Fiona and, seeing how broken she is, forgives her, apologizing for his harsh attitude towards her. Carl and Bonnie bond through theft. Mickey argues with Kevin over the money they're making on their joint venture. Veronica gives birth to twins. Ian and Mickey discover that Mandy is back with Kenyatta. Ian wants to take Mandy to a safe place, and the ensuing argument culminates in Ian holding a knife to Kenyatta's throat. In order to increase her chances of adopting, Sheila marries Frank, who is in deteriorating health. Sammi and Sheila consult a sketchy doctor who agrees to perform Frank's liver transplant. During the illegal surgery, the doctor steals Frank's kidney instead. At the hospital, Frank's dire condition moves him up the waiting list and he is given a liver transplant.
47	11	"Emily"	Anthony Hemingway	Nancy M. Pimental	March 30, 2014	1.76
Fiona is taken to a correctional facility for a 90-day sentence. Frank wakes up from his transplant, suffering from post-operative delirium. He bonds with Emily, a young girl waiting for a new heart. Believing that Emily is a young Fiona, Frank apologizes for being a bad father, and he cries when Emily dies before her pending transplant. Sammi and Sheila clash while visiting Frank. A social worker visits the house, which is now under Lip's guardianship. The social worker is impressed with Lip's responsibility and aids him. As Lip and Amanda begin dating, Amanda insists that Lip have dinner with her parents, who she is trying to rebel against. After witnessing the Gallaghers' lifestyle, Amanda's parents bribe Lip to break up with her. Lip takes the money, but he and Amanda continue dating nonetheless. Debbie is the victim of a humiliating internet prank set up by Matt's girlfriend. Ian crashes Mickey's son's christening. At a post-party, Terry Milkovich shows up. After Ian calls him a coward, Mickey announces his homosexuality to everyone. This causes a bar brawl between the Milkoviches, and Terry is arrested once more.
48	12	"Lazarus"	Mark Mylod	John Wells	April 6, 2014	1.93
Frank discovers that his transplant medication will produce a number of side effects, and that he still can't drink alcohol. Following a random drug test, Fiona is released due to overcrowding, and her probation officer secures her a job waiting tables at a diner. Fiona reunites with Lip and apologizes, having accepted that she cannot blame her decisions on her poor upbringing. Carl finds out that Bonnie's family has disappeared. Sheila's petition to adopt Roger's children is denied. Svetlana and Mickey come to an understanding about their child and how to raise him. Mickey is worried when he finds Ian in a depressed state. Following an initiation at Amanda's sorority, Lip and Mandy run into each other at a restaurant. Fiona meets with Mickey and concludes that Ian may be bipolar. She suggests hospitalizing Ian, but Mickey disagrees, offering to care for Ian. Carl helps Frank escape the hospital, and the two stop at the edge of Lake Michigan, sharing a bottle of alcohol together. In a post-credits scene, a woman and her male companion pull up outside the Gallagher house. The passenger is revealed to be Jimmy – using the alias 'Jack' – who is very much alive.

== Development and production ==
On January 29, 2013, Showtime announced the series would be renewed for a fourth season. The show's fourth season began production on September 20, 2013, and began filming the following week, and premiered on Sunday, January 12, 2014.

== Reception ==
Review aggregator Rotten Tomatoes gives the fourth season 100%, based on 15 reviews. The critics consensus reads, "Shameless shows no signs of fatigue as it barrels into its fourth season, with the Gallaghers stirring up new and novel forms of mischief."

== DVD release ==
The Complete Fourth Season
Set details		Special features
12 episodes; 642 minutes (Region 1); 624 minutes (Region 4); 3-disc set; 1.77:1 aspect ratio; Languages: English (Dolby Digital 2.0 Surround); Subtitles: English, and French (Region 1); English, Spanish, Danish, French, Dutch, Finnish, Norwegian, Swedish, English and German for the Hearing Impaired (Regions 2 and 4)		Being Gallagher – (featurette); Shameless Neighbors – (featurette); Deleted Scenes – A small selection of deleted scenes of the series.; Episodes: TBA
Release dates		Being Gallagher – (featurette); Shameless Neighbors – (featurette); Deleted Scenes – A small selection of deleted scenes of the series.; Episodes: TBA
United States	Australia	Being Gallagher – (featurette); Shameless Neighbors – (featurette); Deleted Scenes – A small selection of deleted scenes of the series.; Episodes: TBA
December 30, 2014	December 17, 2014	Being Gallagher – (featurette); Shameless Neighbors – (featurette); Deleted Scenes – A small selection of deleted scenes of the series.; Episodes: TBA
