= Hope Springs Paternal =

- Shameless episode
- Episode no.: Season 4 Episode 8
- Directed by: Mimi Leder
- Written by: Sheila Callaghan
- Cinematography by: Kevin McKnight
- Editing by: John M. Valerio
- Original release date: March 9, 2014
- Running time: 55 minutes

Guest appearances
- Emily Bergl as Samantha "Sammi" Slott; Regina King as Gail Johnson; Vanessa Bell Calloway as Carol Fisher; Nick Gehlfuss as Robbie Pratt; Isidora Goreshter as Svetlana; James Allen McCune as Matty Baker; Nichole Sakura as Amanda; Adam Cagley as Ron Kuzner; Jim Hoffmaster as Kermit; Ralph P. Martin as Gun Salesman; Megan Murphy as Lilly; Michael Patrick McGill as Tommy; Ray Porter as Lip's Boss; Lidia Porto as Rosa Ramirez

Episode chronology
← Previous "A Jailbird, Invalid, Martyr, Cutter, Retard and Parasitic Twin"	Next → "The Legend of Bonnie and Carl"
- Shameless season 4

"Hope Springs Paternal" is the eighth episode of the fourth season of the American television comedy drama Shameless, an adaptation of the British series of the same name. It is the 44th overall episode of the series and was written by producer Sheila Callaghan and directed by Mimi Leder. It originally aired on Showtime on March 9, 2014.

The series is set on the South Side of Chicago, Illinois, and depicts the poor, dysfunctional family of Frank Gallagher, a neglectful single father of six: Fiona, Phillip, Ian, Debbie, Carl, and Liam. He spends his days drunk, high, or in search of money, while his children need to learn to take care of themselves. In the episode, Fiona tries to control her life during house arrest, while Ian reunites with his family.

According to Nielsen Media Research, the episode was seen by an estimated 1.77 million household viewers and gained a 0.8 rating share among adults aged 18–49. The episode received critical acclaim, with Emmy Rossum and Jeremy Allen White receiving particular praise for their performances.

== Plot ==
Fiona (Emmy Rossum) adjusts to her house arrest. Bored with her new life, she decides to clean the house and remove all contraband from the house to make a good impression on her probation officer, Gail Johnson (Regina King). Gail is pleased with the results, although Fiona is disappointed to learn that she will not be able to leave the house to find a job for the next two weeks.

Svetlana (Isidora Goreshter) feels jealous of Ian (Cameron Monaghan), and kicks him out of the house. Ian then returns home, reuniting with Fiona. He reveals little of his time in the Army, but continually has ideas for future endeavors. Mickey (Noel Fisher) later visits Ian, and they have sex. Carl (Ethan Cutkosky) is suspended from school due to his constant bullying, and faces a possible expulsion if his legal guardian does not accompany him on Friday. With Fiona unable to leave the house, Carl is forced to ask Frank (William H. Macy) to come with him. Meanwhile, Sammi (Emily Bergl) comes up with the idea of pretending to sell Sheila's house to earn some money for Frank's transplant.

Svetlana goes into labor, but Mickey is not interested in visiting her. Mandy (Emma Greenwell) is also angered when Mickey suggests the baby might not be his. Fiona is visited by Robbie (Nick Gehlfuss), who wants to reconcile after learning she did not reveal he supplied her with the cocaine, but she shuts the door on his face. Bored, Fiona asks Veronica (Shanola Hampton) to accompany her among drinks. When Lip arrives later, he discovers that Fiona accidentally left food in the oven, causing smoke. Irate, Lip decides to take Liam and Carl with him to college, while Debbie (Emma Kenney) decides to spend time with Sammi, slowly bonding with her. After having an emotional breakdown over Liam, Fiona calls Lip, claiming that while she deserves to be punished, she wants her family back.

Carol (Vanessa Bell Calloway) goes into labor, successfully giving birth to her child. While Kevin (Steve Howey) wants to keep the baby, Veronica convinces him to let Carol take care of the baby after seeing Carol's euphoric response. The following morning, Frank and Sammi go to Carl's meeting with the principal. Instead of getting Carl to apologize to the students, Frank delivers a speech where he claims the kids will have better lives through bullying. The episode concludes with Lip reconciling with Fiona by letting her hold Liam.

== Production ==
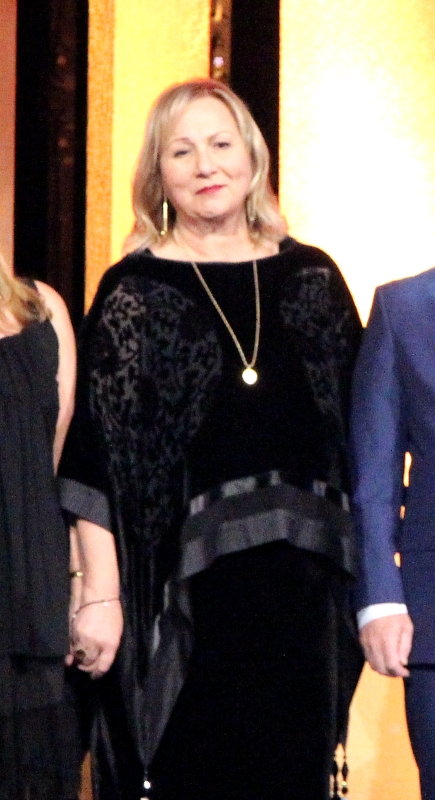
The episode was directed by Mimi Leder.

The episode was written by producer Sheila Callaghan and directed by Mimi Leder. It was Callaghan's fourth writing credit, and Leder's fifth directing credit.

== Reception ==
=== Viewers ===
In its original American broadcast, "Hope Springs Paternal" was seen by an estimated 1.77 million household viewers with a 0.8 in the 18–49 demographics. This means that 0.8 percent of all households with televisions watched the episode. This was a 7% decrease in viewership from the previous episode, which was seen by an estimated 1.89 million household viewers with a 0.9 in the 18–49 demographics.

=== Critical reviews ===
"Hope Springs Paternal" received critical acclaim. Joshua Alston of The A.V. Club gave the episode an "A–" grade and wrote, "Season four of Shameless has chronicled Fiona Gallagher's fall from grace, her journey from being a Southside girl who was more responsible, resilient and resourceful than the world would give her credit for to being that girl who went to jail for letting her baby brother snort cocaine. Falls from grace are usually portrayed more dramatically, with people plummeting from the highest rungs of society to the lowest, but what is happening to Fiona feels much more tragic. The less you have to lose, the more painful it is to lose it."

Carlo Sobral of Paste gave the episode an 8.6 out of 10 rating and wrote "Although "Hope Springs Paternal" might not have hit quite as hard as previous episodes, it managed to cover a lot of ground and get us caught up with exactly how life has already changed for the Gallaghers. The clock ticks, and with only four episodes left, we should either see Frank find a solution or bite the dust soon. For William H. Macy's sake, and our own, let us hope for the former." Rosie Narasaki of Hollywood.com wrote "The look on her face when she wakes up to Liam patting her cheek and Lip smiling ruefully at her from across the room is like the light at the end of a long tunnel of angst. Is Fiona finally on the upswing after hitting rock bottom week after week?"

David Crow of Den of Geek gave the episode a 4 star rating out of 5 and wrote, "Tonight's Shameless is entitled "Hope Springs Eternal," yet the only silver lining I can see around this most dark Gallagher storm is that we could have finally bottomed out. But still, I think we all know Shameless better than that." Leigh Raines of TV Fanatic gave the episode a 4.5 star rating out of 5, and wrote, "I've said it before and I'll say it again: where are the awards for Emmy Rossum? Another episode of Shameless and another dynamite performance. [This episode] was the breakdown of weeks of build up after Fiona's epic mistake with Liam and the cocaine."
