= Strangers on a Train (Shameless) =

- Shameless episode
- Episode no.: Season 4 Episode 4
- Directed by: Peter Segal
- Written by: Etan Frankel
- Cinematography by: Kevin McKnight
- Editing by: Tim Tommasino
- Original release date: February 2, 2014
- Running time: 56 minutes

Guest appearances
- Emily Bergl as Samantha "Sammi" Slott; Alex Borstein as Lou Deckner; Nick Gehlfuss as Robbie Pratt; Dennis Cockrum as Terry Milkovich; Isidora Goreshter as Svetlana; James Allen McCune as Matty Baker; Adam Cagley as Ron Kuzner; Michael Patrick McGill as Tommy; Kerry O'Malley as Kate; Kai Caster as Seth; Rosalind Chao as Doctor; Svetlana Efremova as Sasha; Gideon Emery as Professor Moss; Michael Mantell as Dean Wheeler; Danika Yarosh as Holly Herkimer

Episode chronology
← Previous "Like Father, Like Daughter"	Next → "There's the Rub"
- Shameless season 4

"Strangers on a Train" is the fourth episode of the fourth season of the American television comedy drama Shameless, an adaptation of the British series of the same name. It is the 40th overall episode of the series and was written by supervising producer Etan Frankel and directed by Peter Segal. It originally aired on Showtime on February 2, 2014.

The series is set on the South Side of Chicago, Illinois, and depicts the poor, dysfunctional family of Frank Gallagher, a neglectful single father of six: Fiona, Phillip, Ian, Debbie, Carl, and Liam. He spends his days drunk, high, or in search of money, while his children need to learn to take care of themselves. In the episode, Frank realizes he needs to pay a large sum of money for the liver transplant, while Fiona continues her affair with Robbie.

According to Nielsen Media Research, the episode was seen by an estimated 1.22 million household viewers and gained a 0.6 ratings share among adults aged 18–49. The episode received extremely positive reviews from critics, who praised the character development, performances and Frank's storyline.

== Plot ==
Fiona (Emmy Rossum) continues her affair with Robbie (Nick Gehlfuss), who initiates a sexual encounter with her on the subway. Sammi (Emily Bergl) prepares to have herself tested so she can donate her liver to Frank (William H. Macy). However, Frank is told that as he has no insurance, he must pay $150,000 for the transplant to get it as soon as possible. To give Frank a large insurance payout, Carl (Ethan Cutkosky) breaks his leg and makes it look like an accident.

Mickey (Noel Fisher), angered by how little Svetlana (Isidora Goreshter) is being paid, tells her and all the other prostitutes not to work until they are paid more by their employer. Mickey's efforts prove unsuccessful when the women are replaced within a matter of hours, much to Svetlana's dismay. At college, Lip (Jeremy Allen White) arrives late to a test, and the teacher refuses to let him take it. Angered, Lip smashes some cars in the parking lot and flees from campus security guards. He later visits Mandy (Emma Greenwell) and they reconcile before having sex. Lip jokingly suggests Mandy not take the pill, but Mandy is upset by the idea. Lip also reveals his plan to drop out, causing an argument. When Lip calls her a skank, Mandy slaps him, causing him to storm off.

Fiona visits Robbie at his apartment to make it clear their affair is over, but eventually succumbs and they have sex again. However, they are interrupted by the arrival of Mike (Jake McDorman), forcing Fiona to hide throughout the apartment. Debbie (Emma Kenney) decides to send nude photos to Matty (James Allen McCune), but he is shocked and deletes them. To reduce costs, Kevin (Steve Howey) hires Mexican workers at the Alibi Room. When Lip arrives complaining about his life, Kevin tells him to grow up and improve himself, claiming he believes Lip can overcome the system.

Mickey visits Kevin, suggesting he can use an unused room for Svetlana and her co-workers to provide a "rub and tug" service; Kevin considers the idea. When Frank visits Sammi, she reveals that her blood type is not compatible with Frank's blood, which means she cannot give him her liver. An irate Frank goes on a rant, accidentally revealing he is her father. A shocked Sammi angrily kicks him out. However, she later meets with Frank at the Alibi Room; Frank apologizes, and Sammi decides to be a part of his life, wanting to get to know her father. Lip returns to college and convinces his teacher in letting him take a retest.

== Production ==
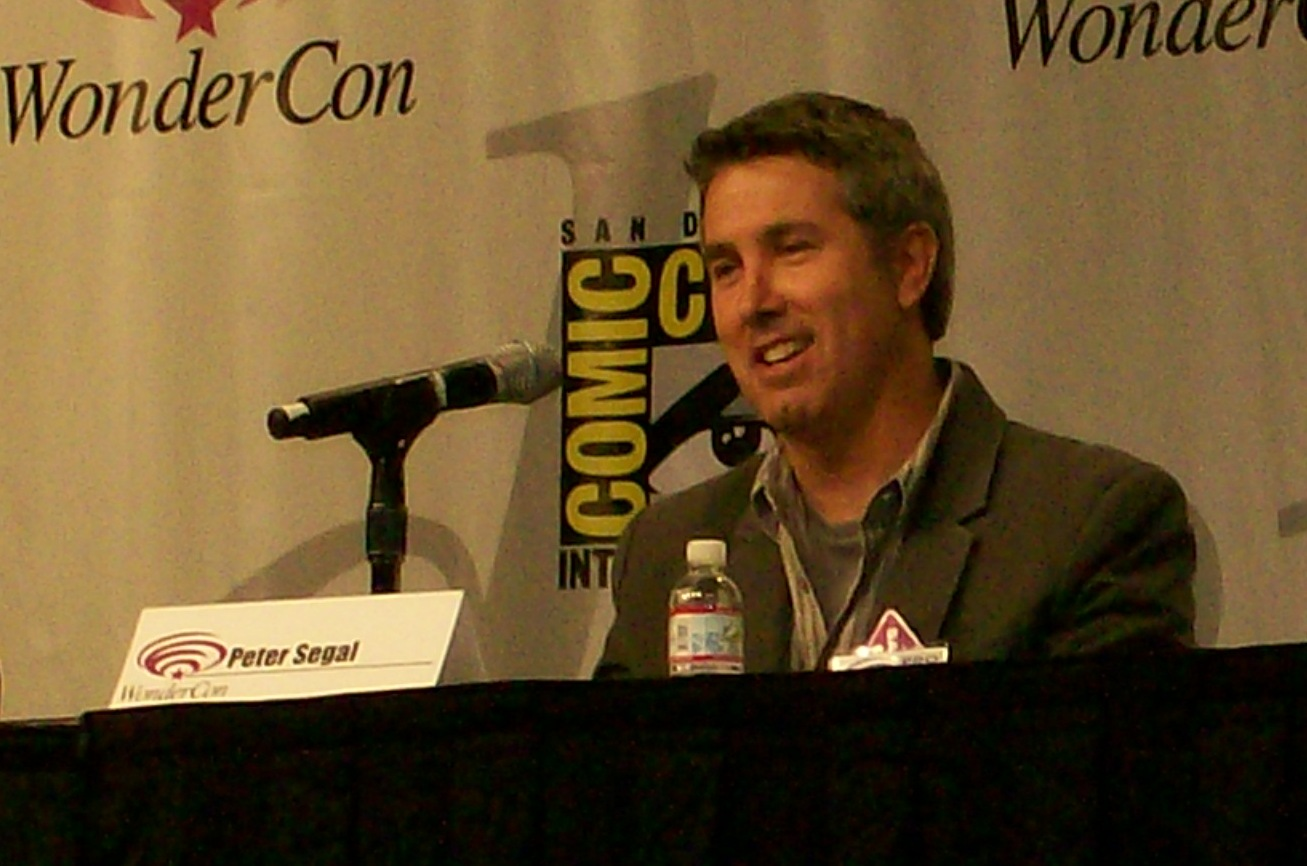
The episode was directed by Peter Segal.

The episode was written by supervising producer Etan Frankel and directed by Peter Segal. It was Frankel's sixth writing credit, and Segal's first directing credit.

== Reception ==
=== Viewers ===
In its original American broadcast, "Strangers on a Train" was seen by an estimated 1.22 million household viewers with a 0.6 in the 18–49 demographics. This means that 0.6 percent of all households with televisions watched the episode. This was a 34 percent decrease in viewership from the previous episode, which was seen by an estimated 1.83 million household viewers with a 0.9 in the 18–49 demographics.

=== Critical reviews ===
"Strangers on a Train" received extremely positive reviews from critics. Joshua Alston of The A.V. Club gave the episode a "B+" grade and praised the pacing of the episode: "I continue to be fascinated by how much better Shameless seems to work when it focuses intently on some of its characters rather than trying to service so many at once. I love Sheila, and I adore Ian, but aside from Fiona, and possibly Debbie, I'm not sure there's any character I'd miss if they were gone for a week." Alston also expressed praise at Emily Bergl's portrayal of Sammi, writing "Bergl was fantastic here. That guttural scream when she kicks Frank out of the trailer is epic."

Carlo Sobral of Paste gave the episode an 8.9 out of 10 rating and wrote "Season 4 of Shameless continues to gather steam in another strong episode which moves quickly and ends on a happier note, with Lip getting to re-take the test as Frank and Sammi patch things up at The Alibi. Seeing where some of the main characters are, those happy moments should be much rarer in coming weeks." Hollywood.com wrote, "All in all, a frenetically solid episode – we're already looking forward to next week."

David Crow of Den of Geek gave the episode a 3 star rating out of 5. Crow enjoyed Frank's storyline but disliked Debbie's story arc, largely criticizing the uncomfortable undertones given the age of the actress: "Seeing Emma Kenney, who is 14-years-old in real life, take her shirt off to take "selfies" of herself to sext to her 20-year-old boyfriend (and every audience member of the millions who watch Shameless) is unnecessarily skeevy [...] It was an otherwise strong episode, but that subplot has to ding its final score by at least one star." Leigh Raines of TV Fanatic gave the episode a 3.5 star rating out of 5, and wrote, "Fiona has had a few lapses of judgment over the past few seasons of Shameless. But [this episode] showed us just how low she could go in her latest relationship."
