= The Legend of Bonnie and Carl =

- Shameless episode
- Episode no.: Season 4 Episode 9
- Directed by: Mark Mylod
- Written by: Etan Frankel
- Cinematography by: Kevin McKnight
- Editing by: Finnian Murray
- Original release date: March 16, 2014
- Running time: 53 minutes

Guest appearances
- Joan Cusack as Sheila Jackson; Emily Bergl as Samantha "Sammi" Slott; Regina King as Gail Johnson; Nick Gehlfuss as Robbie Pratt; Morgan Lily as Bonnie; Maile Flanagan as Connie; Isidora Goreshter as Svetlana; James Allen McCune as Matty Baker; Shel Bailey as Kenyatta; Nichole Sakura as Amanda; Elizabeth Bond as Elena; Adam Cagley as Ron Kuzner; Kate Cobb as Jane Pratt; Michael Patrick McGill as Tommy

Episode chronology
← Previous "Hope Springs Paternal"	Next → "Liver, I Hardly Know Her"
- Shameless season 4

"The Legend of Bonnie and Carl" is the ninth episode of the fourth season of the American television comedy drama Shameless, an adaptation of the British series of the same name. It is the 45th overall episode of the series and was written by supervising producer Etan Frankel and directed by executive producer Mark Mylod. It originally aired on Showtime on March 16, 2014.

The series is set on the South Side of Chicago, Illinois, and depicts the poor, dysfunctional family of Frank Gallagher, a neglectful single father of six: Fiona, Phillip, Ian, Debbie, Carl, and Liam. He spends his days drunk, high, or in search of money, while his children need to learn to take care of themselves. In the episode, Fiona tries to find a job, while Mickey is extorted by Svetlana.

According to Nielsen Media Research, the episode was seen by an estimated 1.70 million household viewers and gained a 0.8 ratings share among adults aged 18–49. The episode received positive reviews from critics, who praised the separate storylines in the episode.

== Plot ==
As part of her probation, Fiona (Emmy Rossum) can finally leave the house to find a job. Gail (Regina King) explains the protocol, which dictates that she must be home by 6pm or she will be arrested for violating her parole. Despite that, Fiona struggles in finding jobs, as her charges are making the employers uneasy about hiring her.

Mickey (Noel Fisher) has been staying with the Gallaghers, ignoring Svetlana (Isidora Goreshter) and his child. An upset Svetlana confronts him for his absence, and demands $500 for child support or she will out him to his father when he is released from prison. Mickey asks Kevin (Steve Howey) for his share of the Alibi, but is disappointed to learn it is a very small payment. Desperate, he and Ian (Cameron Monaghan) decide to scam rich businessmen, blackmailing them into giving them money. Debbie (Emma Kenney) is jealous upon learning that Matty (James Allen McCune) has a new girlfriend, but Mandy (Emma Greenwell) suggests stalking her to intimidate her. Debbie starts following her, and goes as far as to plant a snake in her car, warning her to stay away from Matty. However, the girlfriend realizes it was Debbie and threatens her with a baseball bat.

Sheila (Joan Cusack) returns from the reservation, and she discovers Frank (William H. Macy) in dire health. As Frank sleeps, Sheila relates how Roger turned out to be abusive and fled from the law, but expresses interest in adopting his children. To increase her chances of adopting, Sheila comes up with the idea of marrying Frank. When Frank loses consciousness, Sammi (Emily Bergl) calls in an ambulance; Frank resists the paramedics and tells Sammi he just wants alcohol. Amanda (Nichole Sakura) tries to seduce Lip (Jeremy Allen White), which he tries to resist, as she is dating his roommate. However, the roommate is content with letting Lip sleep with her, as he was done with her. Meanwhile, Mandy's boyfriend Kenyatta (Shel Bailey) becomes aware of her affair with Lip and chases him throughout the college to beat him. Security guards restrain Kenyatta, and Lip claims he was a drug dealer. Later, Mickey is shaken to discover that Kenyatta has brutally beaten Mandy.

Carl (Ethan Cutkosky) gets detention for a month for assaulting the students where he connects with a girl named Bonnie (Morgan Lily); they appear to have the same interests for recklessness and violence. He later assists her in robbing a store with a fake gun, although Carl is shocked when Bonnie reveals the gun is real. Bonnie allows Carl to keep all the money, and then kisses him. Sammi surprises Frank by revealing she brought the Alibi Room to him, with Kevin and the patrons accompanying him. Unable to find a job, Fiona visits Worldwide Cup and asks if the reason for her firing can be changed; she is confronted by Mike's sister, who berates Fiona for her actions in front of the entire office. Ashamed and humiliated, Fiona tearfully visits Robbie (Nick Gehlfuss) and blames him for ruining her life.

== Production ==
The episode was written by supervising producer Etan Frankel and directed by executive producer Mark Mylod. It was Frankel's seventh writing credit, and Mylod's tenth directing credit.

== Reception ==
=== Viewers ===
In its original American broadcast, "The Legend of Bonnie and Carl" was seen by an estimated 1.70 million household viewers with a 0.8 in the 18–49 demographics. This means that 0.8 percent of all households with televisions watched the episode. This was a 4 percent decrease in viewership from the previous episode, which was seen by an estimated 1.77 million household viewers with a 0.8 in the 18–49 demographics.

=== Critical reviews ===
"The Legend of Bonnie and Carl" received mostly positive reviews from critics. Carlo Sobral of Paste gave the episode a 9.1 out of 10 rating and wrote "Week after week now, I keep expecting Shameless to take the foot off of the gas a bit. The first couple episodes of season four started slowly, but as things started to pick up, the momentum has continued and Shameless has delivered yet another outstanding episode." Sobral commented highly on the pairing of Bonnie and Carl, but panned Debbie's storyline: "I still feel Debbie's storyline has been the overall weakest of all the Gallagher arcs this season. Emma Kenney can't be faulted. She has played the role well, but ultimately, this Debbie/Matty storyline feels like it has been given more time than necessary." Andy Greenwald of Grantland praised the storylines and themes of the episode: "It's remarkable that a show so devoted to mining laughs out of parental neglect never loses sight of the bruises it leaves behind — and the way the cycle repeats itself in the worst possible ways."

David Crow of Den of Geek gave the episode a perfect 5 star rating out of 5 and wrote, "In many ways, this week is vintage Shameless. It enjoys the series' unique blend of gallows humor and earnest drama that makes it incredibly hard to quantify or categorize. While the series is never sentimental, it knows how to put its heart on its dirty sleeve, which is all the more impressive when there's a good chance of it getting snatched in this neighborhood." Leigh Raines of TV Fanatic gave the episode a 4.5 star rating out of 5, and wrote, "Fiona was finally allowed a brief reprieve from her house arrest on [the episode]. The enthusiasm she had her first morning out quickly dissipated when she realized how hard it would be finding a job with a criminal record."

Joshua Alston of The A.V. Club gave a mixed review, giving the episode a "B–" grade and writing ""The Legend Of Bonnie And Carl" isn't a fantastic episode of Shameless. It sets up some dominoes for the final three episodes, but there's not a ton of joy in it. I think my main issue with the episode was tonal; with the unbelievable mess Fiona has created for herself and Frank passed out against death's door, the leavening humor becomes especially important, and I didn't find much of "Bonnie And Carl" funny." Despite this, Alston gave particular praise towards Frank's storyline: "Frank's scenes with Sammi were pretty incredible, and Frank's reaction to a recreation of the Alibi Room in Sheila's living room is among William H. Macy's all-time greatest Shameless scenes."
