= Liver, I Hardly Know Her =

- Shameless episode
- Episode no.: Season 4 Episode 10
- Directed by: Christopher Chulack
- Written by: Davey Holmes
- Cinematography by: Kevin McKnight
- Editing by: John M. Valerio
- Original release date: March 23, 2014
- Running time: 51 minutes

Guest appearances
- Joan Cusack as Sheila Jackson; Emily Bergl as Samantha "Sammi"; Regina King as Gail Johnson; Vanessa Bell Calloway as Carol Fisher; Nick Gehlfuss as Robbie Pratt; Maz Jobrani as Dr. Johnny; Morgan Lily as Bonnie; Isidora Goreshter as Svetlana; Ronnie Gene Blevins as Lewis; Nichole Sakura as Amanda; Adam Cagley as Ron Kuzner; Robert Cicchini as ER Doctor; Jim Hoffmaster as Kermit; Tobias Jelinek as Clay; Karen Maruyama as Dr. Ma; Michael Patrick McGill as Tommy

Episode chronology
← Previous "The Legend of Bonnie and Carl"	Next → "Emily"
- Shameless season 4

"Liver, I Hardly Know Her" is the tenth episode of the fourth season of the American television comedy drama Shameless, an adaptation of the British series of the same name. It is the 46th overall episode of the series and was written by co-executive producer Davey Holmes and directed by Christopher Chulack. It originally aired on Showtime on March 23, 2014.

The series is set on the South Side of Chicago, Illinois, and depicts the poor, dysfunctional family of Frank Gallagher, a neglectful single father of six: Fiona, Phillip, Ian, Debbie, Carl, and Liam. He spends his days drunk, high, or in search of money, while his children need to learn to take care of themselves. In the episode, Fiona goes on a self-destructive binge, while Frank's condition worsens.

According to Nielsen Media Research, the episode was seen by an estimated 1.63 million household viewers and gained a 0.8 ratings share among adults aged 18–49. The episode received highly positive reviews from critics, who praised the dark humor and twist ending.

== Plot ==
Violating her probation, Fiona (Emmy Rossum) hangs out with Robbie (Nick Gehlfuss) and his friends, using drugs and drinking alcohol. Meanwhile, Sammi (Emily Bergl) gets Carl (Ethan Cutkosky) to visit Frank (William H. Macy), whose health has dropped and might die soon, but Carl cannot bring himself to do it, and decides to spend more time with Bonnie (Morgan Lily). After discovering that Mandy (Emma Greenwell) is being abused by Kenyatta (Shel Bailey), Ian (Cameron Monaghan) lets her temporarily stay at the Gallagher house.

Veronica (Shanola Hampton) gives birth to her twins, Amy and Gemma. As Kevin (Steve Howey) returns to the Alibi Room to get money for the children, he finds the cash register empty. He confronts Mickey (Noel Fisher), who states he took it as part of his commission. Kevin then pulls the gun that Mickey gave him and forces him to return the money, but Mickey swears retribution. Fiona finds herself going with some partygoers on a van, although she loses consciousness due to the alcohol. Stopping at a gas station in Sheboygan, Wisconsin, she goes to the bathroom, only to discover that the van abandoned her. A clerk gets her a phone, which she uses to call Lip (Jeremy Allen White) to pick her up. Lip arrives and, seeing how broken she is, forgives her, apologizing for his harsh attitude towards her.

Desperate to marry Frank, Sheila (Joan Cusack) contacts a sketchy doctor (Maz Jobrani) to get an undercover operation for Frank. The doctor agrees to get him a transplant for $26,000, which Sheila and Sammi provide. The procedure takes six hours, but the doctor claims it was a success. He and his crew leave, after which Sheila and Sammi call an ambulance. At the hospital, however, they are given bad news; the operation was a scam and Frank did not receive a liver transplant, but actually had his kidney stolen. The doctor gives Frank very few days to live, if not hours. While trying to convince Mickey not to seek action against Kevin, Ian discovers that Mandy is back with Kenyatta. In the chaos, Ian almost stabs Kenyatta with a knife until Mickey stops him; Mickey expresses concerns over Ian's erratic behavior.

At his home, Kevin is alarmed by the sound of shots and retrieves a rifle, preparing to face Mickey. However, the sound is revealed to be kids playing with firecrackers. As Kevin returns, he accidentally slips and a bullet hits a glass. Veronica and the children are fine, but Veronica is shaken from the experience, prompting Kevin to get rid of his guns. Ian, Carl and Debbie (Emma Kenney) visit an unconscious Frank on his deathbed, just as a priest officiates Sheila and Frank as a marriage. Suddenly, doctors retrieve Frank and take him to another room; due to his critical condition, he has been moved up the waiting list and will be given a liver transplant. Lip takes Fiona to the station, where Gail (Regina King) awaits her response over her probation violation.

== Production ==
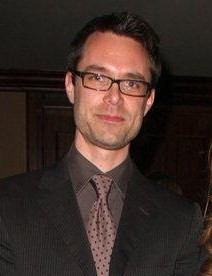
The episode was written by Davey Holmes.

The episode was written by co-executive producer Davey Holmes and directed by Christopher Chulack. It was Holmes' third writing credit, and Chulack's first directing credit.

== Reception ==
=== Viewers ===
In its original American broadcast, "Liver, I Hardly Know Her" was seen by an estimated 1.63 million household viewers with a 0.8 in the 18–49 demographics. This means that 0.8 percent of all households with televisions watched the episode. This was a 5% decrease in viewership from the previous episode, which was seen by an estimated 1.70 million household viewers with a 0.8 in the 18–49 demographics.

=== Critical reviews ===
"Liver, I Hardly Know Her" received highly positive reviews from critics. Joshua Alston of The A.V. Club gave the episode a "B" grade and wrote, ""Liver, I Hardly Know Her" is blander and feels more cobbled together. But I enjoyed the experience of watching it more, and I felt better about it when it ended. Perhaps what left me on a higher note about "Liver" is that it seemed to signal, at last, something approaching a reset for Fiona after her epic decline." However, Alston was mixed over Sheila's decision to marry Frank, writing "The big issue with Sheila this season is that her character is being used as a tool to push the story in this direction or that one, and Sheila doesn't seem to have much to do on her own."

Carlo Sobral of Paste gave the episode a 9.3 out of 10 rating and wrote "This season more than ever, Shameless has moved along at a brisk pace. The show achieves so much in each episode, and "Liver, I Hardly Know Her" might be season four's best example of that." Sobral gave praise towards Emmy Rossum and Jeremy Allen White's performance, writing "[White and Rossum] have always had great brother/sister chemistry, and that was on full display again here when Lip picked Fiona up at the gas station and drove her home." Sobral also spoke highly of Joan Cusack's portrayal as Sheila, writing "Cusack has maybe her best performance of the season here, generating a lot of laughs." Rosie Narasaki of Hollywood.com wrote "Shameless being Shameless, it's not all coming up roses: even in the midst of their reconciliation, Lip's taking her straight to the police station, and the end of the episode finds Fiona face-to-face with her probation officer."

David Crow of Den of Geek gave the episode a 3.5 star rating out of 5 and wrote, "Overall, it was a solid episode that felt like things are finally looking up. Fiona truly bottomed out this week, and Frank won't die. While one will be in jail and the other in surgery during the penultimate episode next week, things could have honestly gone much worse for either of them." Crow also gave particular praise towards the performances of Steve Howey and Shanola Hampton, portraying Kevin and Veronica respectively: "These two are absolutely fantastic as the reliable comic relief." Leigh Raines of TV Fanatic gave the episode a 4.5 star rating out of 5, and wrote, "After everything Fiona's been through, it was only a matter of time before she had a breakdown. [The episode] had all of the Gallagher siblings looking for her in fear that she had pulled a Frank."

=== Accolades ===
For the episode, Joan Cusack received a nomination for Outstanding Guest Actress in a Comedy Series at the 66th Primetime Emmy Awards. She would lose to Uzo Aduba for Orange Is the New Black.
