= A Jailbird, Invalid, Martyr, Cutter, Retard and Parasitic Twin =

- Shameless episode
- Episode no.: Season 4 Episode 7
- Directed by: Gary B. Goldman
- Written by: Nancy M. Pimental
- Cinematography by: Kevin McKnight
- Editing by: Tim Tommasino
- Original release date: February 23, 2014
- Running time: 50 minutes

Guest appearances
- Emily Bergl as Samantha "Sammi" Slott; Wendy Phillips as Professor Sacco; Lisa Vidal as Maria Vidal; Isidora Goreshter as Svetlana; James Allen McCune as Matty Baker; Nichole Sakura as Amanda; Edward Edwards as Mark; Denise Grayson as Kaitlin Shanor; Will Green as Howie; Gregory Linington as Craig Jeffries; Jayden Lund as Scott; Karen Maruyama as Dr. Ma; Michael Patrick McGill as Tommy; Teresa Ornelas as Ellie; Danika Yarosh as Holly Herkimer

Episode chronology
← Previous "Iron City"	Next → "Hope Springs Paternal"
- Shameless season 4

"A Jailbird, Invalid, Martyr, Cutter, Retard and Parasitic Twin" is the seventh episode of the fourth season of the American television comedy drama Shameless, an adaptation of the British series of the same name. It is the 43rd overall episode of the series and was written by executive producer Nancy M. Pimental and directed by Gary B. Goldman. It originally aired on Showtime on February 16, 2014.

The series is set on the South Side of Chicago, Illinois, and depicts the poor, dysfunctional family of Frank Gallagher, a neglectful single father of six: Fiona, Phillip, Ian, Debbie, Carl, and Liam. He spends his days drunk, high, or in search of money, while his children need to learn to take care of themselves. In the episode, Lip is forced to take care of the family, while Fiona faces possible prison time.

According to Nielsen Media Research, the episode was seen by an estimated 1.89 million household viewers and gained a 0.9 ratings share among adults aged 18–49. The episode received mostly positive reviews from critics, with praise towards the performances, pacing and Fiona's storyline.

== Plot ==
Lip (Jeremy Allen White) is forced to act as the legal guardian for his family, while awaiting a Social Services visit. Unwilling to trust Fiona (Emmy Rossum), he is forced to take Liam with him to college. Lip receives assistance from his roommate's girlfriend, Amanda (Nichole Sakura), who offers to take care of Liam while he takes his classes.

After complaining to the construction workers outside, Kevin (Steve Howey) is robbed at the Alibi Room by two masked man. He complains to Mickey (Noel Fisher) for not having protected the area according to their partnership, and takes a handgun for protection. He informs Veronica (Shanola Hampton) about the robbery, but is surprised when she reveals that she lost one of her triplets through fetal resorption. Carl (Ethan Cutkosky) punches two bullies who refer to Liam as a "fool" over the cocaine incident; Carl also grows worried over Liam's odd behavior. Fiona meets with her public defender, Maria Vidal (Lisa Vidal), to attend her hearing. The attorney wants five years for Fiona, but is willing to negotiate a 3-year probation for Fiona if she takes a guilty plea and spends up to 3 months in prison. However, Fiona does not want to take the plea and instead expresses interest in taking the case to trial.

Mandy (Emma Greenwell) scolds Mickey for not going after Ian (Cameron Monaghan), and gives him the address of Ian's club job to find him. After threatening the club's owner, Mickey discovers that Ian has become a lap dancer by the name of Curtis. Mickey informs Ian of Fiona's arrest and urges him to come back home, but Ian, having used drugs, is not interested. Ian later passes out outside the club; Mickey decides to take Ian to his house, upsetting Svetlana (Isidora Goreshter). Debbie (Emma Kenney) once again tries to seduce Matty (James Allen McCune), but he tells her she needs a boyfriend of her age, devastating her. When Frank (William H. Macy) continues complaining about his pain, Sammi (Emily Bergl) gives him a dose of heroin to help him ease the pain. That night, Lip and Fiona have a heated argument over her taking the case to trial, with Lip angrily telling her she is guilty even if it was an accident. Discovering that Frank has been using heroin, Lip kicks him and Sammi out of the house. Sammi later breaks into Sheila's house to provide Frank with proper care.

At the next hearing, the judge accepts Vidal's request to reduce the sentence, preventing Fiona from going to jail. Nevertheless, the plea deal will involve Fiona facing different protocols, as well as being placed under house arrest. Fiona declares herself guilty, and she is given an ankle monitor.

== Production ==
The episode was written by executive producer Nancy M. Pimental and directed by Gary B. Goldman. It was Pimental's tenth writing credit, and Goldman's second directing credit.

== Reception ==
=== Viewers ===
In its original American broadcast, "A Jailbird, Invalid, Martyr, Cutter, Retard and Parasitic Twin" was seen by an estimated 1.89 million household viewers with a 0.9 in the 18–49 demographics. This means that 0.9 percent of all households with televisions watched the episode. This was a slight decrease in viewership from the previous episode, which was seen by an estimated 1.90 million household viewers with a 0.9 in the 18–49 demographics.

=== Critical reviews ===
The episode received mostly positive reviews from critics. Joshua Alston of The A.V. Club gave a "B" grade and wrote:

"A Jailbird, Invalid, Martyr, Cutter, Retard And Parasitic Twin" has to be granted a wide berth. There's no other way to appreciate it for what it is. It's the episode that came after the most emotionally devastating hour Shameless has ever done. There's got to be a morning after, and "Jailbird" gets the thankless task of cleaning up the balled-up tissues "Iron City" left behind. It's the kind of episode that gets to be wobbly and ungainly because it's functioning as both a piece-mover and a palate cleanser, and that's a tricky balance to strike.

Carlo Sobral of Paste gave the episode a 9.1 out of 10 rating and wrote "Season four has put every single character in an unfamiliar situation, and the entire cast has risen to the occasion. Just past the season's halfway point now, Shameless keeps on rolling with another hard-hitting, emotional episode." Sobral commented highly of Mickey's storyline, calling it his "finest episode in the series to date", and particularly praised the final scene between Mickey, Ian and Svetlana: "As is so often the case with Shameless, neither actor says a word, yet their expressions say more than any line of dialogue could ever convey."

David Crow of Den of Geek gave the episode a 4 star rating out of 5 and wrote, "Like a heavy hangover, this week's Shameless is about recovering from the last two bombshell episodes, as well as the return of Ian."

Leigh Raines of TV Fanatic gave the episode a 4.5 star rating out of 5, and wrote, "This episode felt very centered around the theme of child endangerment and I don't just mean the court case. But if Fiona didn't feel guilty enough at the end after pleading guilty, Lip's comment about how guilty she was should do it."
