= Like Father, Like Daughter (Shameless) =

- Shameless episode
- Episode no.: Season 4 Episode 3
- Directed by: Sanaa Hamri
- Written by: Sheila Callaghan
- Cinematography by: Kevin McKnight
- Editing by: Finnian Murray
- Original release date: January 26, 2014
- Running time: 55 minutes

Guest appearances
- Joan Cusack as Sheila Jackson; Emily Bergl as Samantha "Sammi" Slott; Nick Gehlfuss as Robbie Pratt; James Allen McCune as Matty Baker; Adam Cagley as Ron Kuzner; Eloy Casados as Roger Runningtree; Gideon Emery as Professor Moss; Steven M. Gagnon as Bill Pratt; Michael Patrick McGill as Tommy; Teresa Ornelas as Ellie; Ray Porter as Lip's Boss; Danika Yarosh as Holly Herkimer

Episode chronology
← Previous "My Oldest Daughter"	Next → "Strangers on a Train"
- Shameless season 4

"Like Father, Like Daughter" is the third episode of the fourth season of the American television comedy drama Shameless, an adaptation of the British series of the same name. It is the 39th overall episode of the series and was written by producer Sheila Callaghan and directed by Sanaa Hamri. It originally aired on Showtime on January 26, 2014.

The series is set on the South Side of Chicago, Illinois, and depicts the poor, dysfunctional family of Frank Gallagher, a neglectful single father of six: Fiona, Phillip, Ian, Debbie, Carl, and Liam. He spends his days drunk, high, or in search of money, while his children need to learn to take care of themselves. In the episode, Frank contacts his daughter for help, while Fiona meets Mike's family.

According to Nielsen Media Research, the episode was seen by an estimated 1.83 million household viewers and gained a 0.9 ratings share among adults aged 18–49. The episode received extremely positive reviews from critics, who praised the conflicts in the episode.

== Plot ==
As they continue their relationship, Mike (Jake McDorman) suggests the idea of Fiona (Emmy Rossum) moving in with him; they also prepare to have dinner with his family. While Frank (William H. Macy) leaves to locate Samantha, Carl (Ethan Cutkosky) decides to make a scheme where he kidnaps dogs and holds them for ransom to pay for his surgery.

Per her friends' suggestion, Debbie (Emma Kenney) decides to wear a dress to seduce Matty (James Allen McCune). However, Matty is not interested in a relationship and convinces her to just stay and watch Eraserhead with him. As Kevin (Steve Howey) and Veronica (Shanola Hampton) still debate over their future children, Veronica decides to sell drugs at the Alibi Room to pay off Kevin's new debt. Sheila (Joan Cusack) starts using an online dating app, although she is worried over the content posted over the site. Nevertheless, she enjoys a good date with Native American, Roger Runningtree (Eloy Casados). Depressed and unhappy with his life, Mickey (Noel Fisher) has sex with a woman in a restroom and pretends she is Ian.

Frank locates his daughter Sammi (Emily Bergl) living in a trailer and discovers that Sammi has a son, Chuckie. Frank pays a kid to punch Chuckie in front of Sammi so he can defend him and make a good impression on her. Sammi thanks Frank and invites him out to dinner; the two bond over their shared interests, although Frank does not reveal himself as her father. After opening up about his medical condition, Sammi offers to donate her liver. Frank is delighted, but is also disturbed when Sammi feels romantically attracted to him. Lip (Jeremy Allen White) continues struggling to adjust at college, arriving late at work and classes. Despite staying up all night writing a paper, Lip only receives a passable grade.

At dinner with Mike's family, Fiona is introduced to his drug addict brother, Robbie (Nick Gehlfuss). Robbie and his family are on bad terms, and he storms out after getting into an argument with Mike over his life. Later, Mike and Fiona invite Robbie to dine, hoping to solve all their problems; Fiona and Robbie have an intimate conversation about addiction. At Mike's house, Fiona and Robbie suddenly have sex in the kitchen, but they are interrupted by a drunk Mike stumbling out of the bedroom, prompting Robbie to leave. When Mike wakes up in the morning, he has no idea of their encounter. Fiona returns home and calls Mike, only to be answered by Robbie. Fiona states it will not happen again, but Robbie calls her an addict and states they will have sex again eventually.

== Production ==
The episode was written by Sheila Callaghan.

The episode was written by producer Sheila Callaghan and directed by Sanaa Hamri. It was Callaghan's third writing credit, and Hamri's third directing credit.

== Reception ==
=== Viewers ===
In its original American broadcast, "Like Father, Like Daughter" was seen by an estimated 1.83 million household viewers with a 0.9 in the 18–49 demographics. This means that 0.9 percent of all households with televisions watched the episode. This was a 14 percent increase in viewership from the previous episode, which was seen by an estimated 1.60 million household viewers with a 0.8 in the 18–49 demographics.

=== Critical reviews ===
"Like Father, Like Daughter" received extremely positive reviews from critics. Joshua Alston of The A.V. Club gave the episode a "B+" grade and wrote, "Sheila is still a bit of a question mark, and it's beginning to feel like Shameless may have outgrown her. I adore Joan Cusack's performance, so I certainly hope that isn't the case, but Sheila's adventures in online dating aren't a draw for me."

Carlo Sobral of Paste gave the episode an 8.8 out of 10 rating and wrote "After two relatively tame episodes of Shameless to start season 4, "Like Father, Like Daughter" saw the show return to its more dysfunctional, disturbing side. With Ian still absent and most of the secondary characters having limited screen time, this episode spent a lot of time on fewer characters, making it an even more focused installment than last week."

David Crow of Den of Geek gave the episode a 4 star rating out of 5 and wrote, "Despite its slightly more deliberate pace, this is the first truly Shameless episode of the new season, and the one that lays on the table why these characters are so very much Gallaghers." Leigh Raines of TV Fanatic gave the episode a 4.5 star rating out of 5, and wrote, "Despite spending the first two episodes of the season immobile, Frank put a little pep in his step in order to impress his long lost daughter Sammi. Yes, the episode introduced us to Frank's eldest spawn."
