= There's the Rub (Shameless) =

- Shameless episode
- Episode no.: Season 4 Episode 5
- Directed by: David Nutter
- Written by: Davey Holmes
- Cinematography by: Kevin McKnight
- Editing by: Finnian Murray
- Original release date: February 9, 2014
- Running time: 51 minutes

Guest appearances
- Joan Cusack as Sheila Jackson; Emily Bergl as Samantha "Sammi" Slott; Harry Hamlin as Lloyd Lishman; Alex Borstein as Lou Deckner; Nick Gehlfuss as Robbie Pratt; Maile Flanagan as Connie; Isidora Goreshter as Svetlana; Raff Anoushian as Foreman; Shel Bailey as Kenyatta; Eloy Casados as Roger Runningtree; Steven M. Gagnon as Bill Pratt; Lyn Alicia Henderson as Paramedic #1; Lynn Ann Leveridge as Nancy Pratt; Virginia Morris as Mrs. Bergdoll; Drew Rausch as Sgt. Benz; Montae Russell as Paramedic #2; Jonathan Schmock as Alan Kopchek

Episode chronology
← Previous "Strangers on a Train"	Next → "Iron City"
- Shameless season 4

"There's the Rub" is the fifth episode of the fourth season of the American television comedy drama Shameless, an adaptation of the British series of the same name. It is the 41st overall episode of the series and was written by co-executive producer Davey Holmes and directed by David Nutter. It originally aired on Showtime on February 9, 2014.

The series is set on the South Side of Chicago, Illinois, and depicts the poor, dysfunctional family of Frank Gallagher, a neglectful single father of six: Fiona, Phillip, Ian, Debbie, Carl, and Liam. He spends his days drunk, high, or in search of money, while his children need to learn to take care of themselves. In the episode, Fiona tries to end her affair with Robbie, while Lip searches for Ian when military officers inform him he impersonated him at the Army.

According to Nielsen Media Research, the episode was seen by an estimated 1.58 million household viewers and gained a 0.7 ratings share among adults aged 18–49. The episode received critical acclaim, who praised the tone and the episode's climax.

== Plot ==
While studying in the bathroom, Lip (Jeremy Allen White) is approached by two military officers. They explain that a person has been impersonating Lip in the Army, and then the soldier stole a helicopter and went AWOL. When they show him a picture of Ian (Cameron Monaghan), Lip claims he does not know him.

The Alibi Room's business is put in jeopardy when a construction takes place outside, which will cost its customers for almost two months. On top of that, Kevin (Steve Howey) is threatened by Alan (Jonathan Schmock) for not paying his monthly fee on time. At a motel, Fiona (Emmy Rossum) tells Robbie (Nick Gehlfuss) that their affair is over, despite his insistence. Later, Fiona joins Mike (Jake McDorman) for dinner with his parents to celebrate her birthday. Mike and Robbie get into a heated argument, but Robbie shocks his brother by revealing his affair with Fiona. Mike punches him in the face, and asks Fiona to leave, ending their relationship.

Frank (William H. Macy) continues spending time with Sammi (Emily Bergl), worrying Carl (Ethan Cutkosky) that he has been sidelined. When Sammi asks him if he only contacted her for the liver, Frank confirms it. However, he adds that her decision to stay with him made him want to be part of her life, feeling she was his only child to not give up on him. Frank later meets with Lou (Alex Borstein) to get the insurance money. While Lou states that he will receive $100,000, the process will take at least one year. Desperate for a cure to his liver disease, Frank visits Sheila (Joan Cusack) and convinces Roger (Eloy Casados) to build a sweat lodge to rid his body of toxins. He gets Carl and Chuckie to retrieve small trees needed for the lodge. Carl later asks his father about Sammi; Frank states that Sammi might be his "last chance to get it right", prompting Carl to walk out.

Lip and Debbie (Emma Kenney) visit Lloyd (Harry Hamlin) to check if he saw Ian, and he reveals that Ian stayed with him until his erratic behavior prompted him to kick him out. He claims he now lives with Monica at an abandoned house, but only a woman is living there; she gives them the address of Ian's new job as a bartender at a gay club. They finally reunite with Ian, but he avoids Lip's interrogation regarding his fake ID. Cornered once again by Alan, Kevin manages to settle his debt by giving him and his friend free service for masturbation through his new partnership with Mickey (Noel Fisher).

Fiona awkwardly returns to work, where her co-workers throw her a birthday party. She meets with Mike at her office, explaining her decision was to prove that he did not deserve him. Mike does not fire her, but demotes her to accountant management as he does not want to see her more often. Robbie surprises Fiona by showing up at her house and giving her cocaine as a present, but she kicks him out instead. Nevertheless, Fiona throws a party and decides to snort the cocaine, which she later shares with Kevin. As Lip and Debbie arrive, Debbie is horrified to discover that Liam had accidentally snorted some of the cocaine and has lost consciousness. As Liam is taken to the hospital, the police arrive at the sweat lodge to inform Frank, only to find that he has passed out. At the hospital, officers arrest Fiona, who cries as she is driven away in the police cruiser.

== Production ==
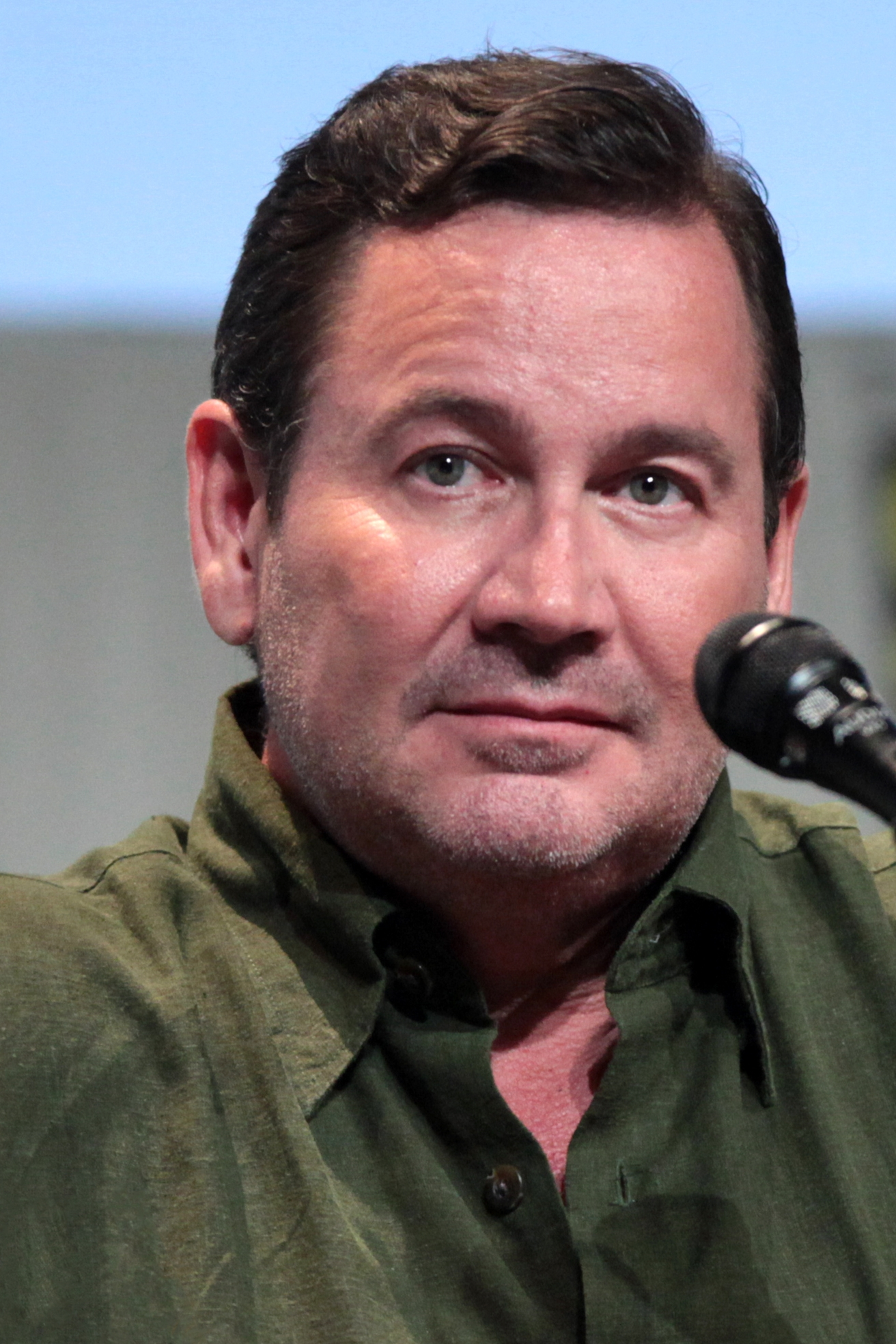
The episode was directed by David Nutter.

The episode was written by co-executive producer Davey Holmes and directed by David Nutter. It was Holmes' second writing credit, and Nutter's third directing credit.

== Reception ==
=== Viewers ===
In its original American broadcast, "There's the Rub" was seen by an estimated 1.58 million household viewers with a 0.7 in the 18–49 demographics. This means that 0.7 percent of all households with televisions watched the episode. This was a 29% increase in viewership from the previous episode, which was seen by an estimated 1.22 million household viewers with a 0.6 in the 18–49 demographics.

=== Critical reviews ===
"There's the Rub" received critical acclaim. Joshua Alston of The A.V. Club gave the episode an "A–" grade and wrote, ""There's The Rub" is awfully tough to watch. I'll say this though: After watching it, I'll never watch the local news the same way again. On so many local newscasts, on so many nights, there is a story much like the gut-punch ending of "There's The Rub."" Alston commended Fiona's storyline, calling it a representation of "Shameless at its best", and further adding "This is a show that is unafraid of dumping a pile of bricks on its characters and watching them wriggle their way out of it." Alan Sepinwall of HitFix wrote, "I don't want to see the family suffer more, but having introduced all these rather large problems, I also don't want Shameless to run away from them. Things are very bad right now, and they could get much worse."

Carlo Sobral of Paste gave the episode a 9.3 out of 10 rating and wrote "As we've come to expect from its first few seasons, Shameless often reaches its peak when it's most difficult to watch. After things began looking up for some of the Gallaghers recently, this week's "There's the Rub" brought their world crashing down around them in a gut-wrenching episode." Sobral particularly highlighted the performances of Rossum and White: "This episode really sets the stage for Fiona and Lip, whose respective actors, Emmy Rossum and Jeremy Allen White, steal the show. [...] These two talented actors say so much with just their expressions." Hollywood.com wrote, "Shameless just has some kind of unspoken law against upwards motion, doesn't it? The higher you get (no pun intended), the farther you have to fall."

David Crow of Den of Geek gave the episode a 3 star rating out of 5 and praised the twist ending, calling it "the first major surprise curveball that Shameless has really thrown us this season, and it hit hard." Crow particularly commended Rossum's performance, writing "Rossum’s face brings in utter, self-fulfilled despair not seen since she realized Jimmy wasn’t coming back. It is a brief, tour de force moment for the actress that can rally viewers to accept where this is headed." Leigh Raines of TV Fanatic gave the episode a perfect 5 star rating out of 5, praising the performances and storylines, and concluded of the episode: "I don't want to say that [the season] has been a little lackluster thus far, but it has been lacking. Maybe it's Fiona in corporate America, less Lip and a missing Ian, but whatever it was something felt askew. However, that all changed on [this episode], leaving my jaw on the floor by the end of the installment."
