= Simple Pleasures (Shameless) =

- Shameless episode
- Episode no.: Season 4 Episode 1
- Directed by: John Wells
- Written by: John Wells
- Cinematography by: Kevin McKnight
- Editing by: Finnian Murray
- Original release date: January 12, 2014
- Running time: 56 minutes

Guest appearances
- Joan Cusack as Sheila Jackson; Vanessa Bell Calloway as Carol Fisher; Jack Carter as Stan; Tyler Jacob Moore as Tony Markovich; Dennis Cockrum as Terry Milkovich; Isidora Goreshter as Svetlana; Joe Adler as Colin Milkovich; Bill Brochtrup as Hal; Maile Flanagan as Connie; James Allen McCune as Matty Baker; Rose Abdoo as Dr. Vega; Adam Cagley as Ron Kuzner; Kate Cobb as Jane Pratt; Paul James as T.A.; Lynn Ann Leveridge as Nancy Pratt; Michael Patrick McGill as Tommy; Danika Yarosh as Holly Herkimer

Episode chronology
| ← Previous "Survival of the Fittest" | Next → "My Oldest Daughter" |
- Shameless season 4

"Simple Pleasures" is the first episode of the fourth season of the American television comedy drama Shameless, an adaptation of the British series of the same name. It is the 37th overall episode of the series and was written and directed by series developer John Wells. It originally aired on Showtime on January 12, 2014.

The series is set on the South Side of Chicago, Illinois, and depicts the poor, dysfunctional family of Frank Gallagher, a neglectful single father of six: Fiona, Phillip, Ian, Debbie, Carl, and Liam. He spends his days drunk, high, or in search of money, while his children need to learn to take care of themselves. In the episode, Fiona navigates her new life with Mike, while Carl decides to take care of Frank after seeing his declining medical condition.

According to Nielsen Media Research, the episode was seen by an estimated 1.69 million household viewers and gained a 0.9 ratings share among adults aged 18–49. The episode received extremely positive reviews from critics, who considered it a promising start for the season, praising the multiple storylines.

== Plot ==
Fiona (Emmy Rossum) has been working at Worldwide Cup for three months, while also semi-dating Mike (Jake McDorman). With her new job, Fiona is able to provide more money for her siblings and is able to set up her 401K plan. The Gallaghers are in minimal contact with Ian (Cameron Monaghan) and are unsure of his exact whereabouts; Debbie (Emma Kenney) pushes Fiona to file a missing persons report. Feeling lonely, Sheila (Joan Cusack) regularly visits the Gallagher house to clean and babysit in Fiona's absence. Lip (Jeremy Allen White) has moved out of the Gallagher house and now attends classes at the Chicago Polytechnic institute, while also working in the cafeteria.

A few police officers, including Tony (Tyler Jacob Moore), raid a drug house and discover Frank (William H. Macy), who is now injecting himself with needles. After Tony takes Frank home, Carl (Ethan Cutkosky) and Sheila clean Frank and let him sleep in Ian's bed. Fiona refuses to let Frank stay, but Carl convinces her in allowing it. Frank explains to Carl that his body has worsened, and he is unable to drink alcohol without vomiting blood. Debbie is starting to blossom, physically and emotionally, and she regularly hangs out with her friends Holly (Danika Yarosh) and Ellie in order to show her social life is improving. She later befriends an older pizza-delivering bachelor, Matty Baker (James Allen McCune).

While Kevin (Steve Howey) and Veronica (Shanola Hampton) anticipate the arrival of Carol's baby, Veronica is shocked to discover that she is also pregnant. Kevin is devastated after learning that Stan (Jack Carter) died, but is delighted when Veronica reveals her pregnancy. Mickey (Noel Fisher) is bored with his soulless marriage with Svetlana (Isidora Goreshter) and is depressed over Ian's disappearance. Lip gets angry when he finds that he got a D grade on his English paper and confronts the grader; Lip is told that his essay was lazily written with a lack of originality, and is asked to work harder or consider taking another course. Fiona and Mike have sex for the first time, but she seems unsatisfied by the experience. Carl starts to experience nocturnal emissions, and Frank teaches him about masturbation before sleep to avoid this. While Carl leaves for the bathroom, Frank tries to drink alcohol but continues to cough blood. The following morning, Carl buys Vaseline to help his new discovery.

== Production ==
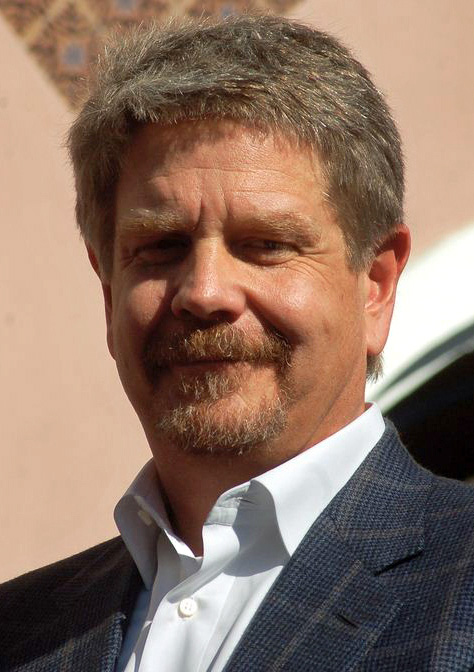
John Wells

The episode was written and directed by series developer John Wells. It was Wells' seventh writing credit, and his fourth directing credit.

== Reception ==
=== Viewers ===
In its original American broadcast, "Simple Pleasures" was seen by an estimated 1.69 million household viewers with a 0.9 in the 18–49 demographics. This means that 0.9 percent of all households with televisions watched the episode. This was a 8 percent decrease in viewership from the previous episode, which was seen by an estimated 1.82 million household viewers with a 0.9 in the 18–49 demographics.

=== Critical reviews ===
"Simple Pleasures" received extremely positive reviews from critics. Joshua Alston of The A.V. Club gave the episode a "B+" grade and wrote, ""Simple Pleasures" had the silhouette of a standard Shameless opener — light on red meat, heavy on context and breadcrumbs — but with so many questions dangling over the show, it felt heavier than a Shameless premiere usually does."

Alan Sepinwall of HitFix wrote "It's an excellent, appropriately effed-up beginning (like Frank's advice to Carl about not masturbating in the shower because "That's how incest babies get born") and suggests the creative team has found a way to evolve without having to radically change what the show is." Carlo Sobral of Paste gave the episode a 7.9 out of 10 rating and wrote "Overall, without as many great Frank moments as we've become accustomed to, and with some of the series' most intriguing characters having reduced (or entirely zero) screen time, I expect next week's episode to cover more ground. Here's hoping Frank somehow gets better. As good as Shameless has been, I'm not sure I could continue watching without him."

David Crow of Den of Geek gave the episode a 3.5 star rating out of 5 and wrote, "It is good to see things shifting underneath their feet, but personally, it feels like a recoil that is still readjusting us back to status quo. The times they are a-changin'. But when they revert, it might be the biggest shame." Leigh Raines of TV Fanatic gave the episode a 4 star rating out of 5, and wrote, "Emmy Rossum is back as Fiona Gallagher on Shameless, except she's kicking off the season with the one thing she's never had before: a steady paycheck."
