= Iron City (Shameless) =

- Shameless episode
- Episode no.: Season 4 Episode 6
- Directed by: James Ponsoldt
- Written by: John Wells
- Cinematography by: Kevin McKnight
- Editing by: John Valerio
- Original release date: February 16, 2014
- Running time: 56 minutes

Guest appearances
- Joan Cusack as Sheila Jackson; Emily Bergl as Samantha "Sammi" Slott; Scott Grimes as Dr. Zabel; Lisa Vidal as Maria Vidal; Audrey Wasilewski as Ann Matlock; Dennis Cockrum as Terry Milkovich; James Allen McCune as Matty Baker; Hedy Burress as Doctor; Adam Cagley as Ron Kuzner; Eloy Casados as Roger Runningtree; Saidah Arrika Ekulona as Sgt. Fuchs; Jan Hoag as Sister Ann Halloran; Bill Kalmenson as Judge Vanwyngarden

Episode chronology
← Previous "There's the Rub"	Next → "A Jailbird, Invalid, Martyr, Cutter, Retard and Parasitic Twin"
- Shameless season 4

"Iron City" is the sixth episode of the fourth season of the American television comedy drama Shameless, an adaptation of the British series of the same name. It is the 42nd overall episode of the series and was written by series developer John Wells and directed by James Ponsoldt. It originally aired on Showtime on February 16, 2014.

The series is set on the South Side of Chicago, Illinois, and depicts the poor, dysfunctional family of Frank Gallagher, a neglectful single father of six: Fiona, Phillip, Ian, Debbie, Carl, and Liam. He spends his days drunk, high, or in search of money, while his children need to learn to take care of themselves. In the episode, Fiona faces possible jail time after Liam's incident, while Frank is faced with his own mortality.

According to Nielsen Media Research, the episode was seen by an estimated 1.90 million household viewers and gained a 0.9 ratings share among adults aged 18–49. The episode received universal acclaim from critics, who praised the emotional tone, limited storylines and performances, with many proclaiming it as one of the best episodes of the series.

== Plot ==
Fiona (Emmy Rossum) is taken by police authorities, who proceed to transfer her to county jail; she desperately asks to know about Liam's condition. As the Gallaghers await in the hospital, Lip (Jeremy Allen White) is allowed to enter Liam's room. He is devastated when the doctor says that despite Liam improving, he might have severe brain damage due to the amount of cocaine he ingested.

Frank (William H. Macy) wakes up in the hospital, accompanied by Sammi (Emily Bergl). Dr. Zabel (Scott Grimes) informs Frank that his conditioned has worsened and warns him he doesn't have much time left to live. Upon leaving the hospital, Frank reluctantly agrees to check hospices with Sammi. Lip is informed that while Liam will be allowed to leave within two days, he might go to a foster home due to Fiona's arrest unless Frank assumes responsibility. When Fiona finally gets her phone call, Lip tells her about Liam's condition and possible brain damage, emotionally destroying her. To complicate matters, Fiona's bail is placed at $100,000, although her public defender convinces the Gallaghers that $10,000 should be enough to cover it. Nevertheless, none of the Gallaghers, nor Kevin (Steve Howey) and Veronica (Shanola Hampton) have anything close to the figure. Lip later visits Mandy (Emma Greenwell) and asks her to contact Ian and inform him of Liam's condition.

Sheila (Joan Cusack) enjoys spending time with Roger (Eloy Casados) and his children but is forced to say goodbye as they prepare to leave for their reservation. Experiencing an empty nest once again, a lonely Sheila decides to leave and join Roger's family at the reservation. When Lip yells at her, Debbie (Emma Kenney) runs off from the courthouse and seeks comfort from Matty (James Allen McCune). Sammi takes Frank to a hospice; the brush with his own mortality terrifies Frank, and he asks to go back home. She takes him to the Gallagher house and informs Carl (Ethan Cutkosky) of Frank's condition. After talking with Lip over the recent events, Carl decides to burn down the sweat lodge after realizing Frank's condition worsened after using it.

After spending a night in jail, Fiona is shocked when she is informed that she made bail, and discovers that Mike (Jake McDorman) bailed her out after Carl called him. As Fiona thanks him, Mike makes it clear he does not want to see her again. Debbie and Matty arrive at the hospital to join the Gallaghers as they await Liam's release; in the process, Sammi is introduced to the rest of her half-siblings. As the family happily reunites with Liam, Fiona arrives at her house, alone.

== Production ==
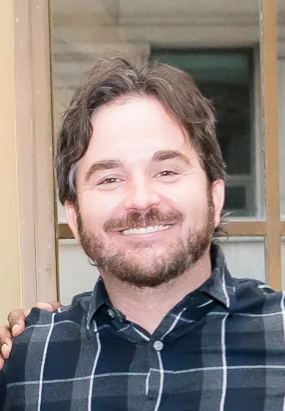
The episode was directed by James Ponsoldt.

The episode was written by series developer John Wells and directed by James Ponsoldt. It was Wells' eighth writing credit, and Ponsoldt's first directing credit.

== Reception ==
=== Viewers ===
In its original American broadcast, "Iron City" was seen by an estimated 1.90 million household viewers with a 0.9 in the 18–49 demographics. This means that 0.9 percent of all households with televisions watched the episode. This was a 20 percent increase in viewership from the previous episode, which was seen by an estimated 1.58 million household viewers with a 0.6 in the 18–49 demographics.

=== Critical reviews ===
"Iron City" received universal acclaim. Joshua Alston of The A.V. Club gave a largely positive review, writing ""Iron City," for possibly the first time in Shameless history, deals with the immediate aftermath of the previous episode, often to devastating effect. By no accident, it's also likely the best hour of television the show has ever produced, and when Emmy campaign season comes circling back, its voting body shouldn't be surprised if they end up watching it more than once. It's submission-worthy for damn near the show's entire cast." Alston praised the performances, particularly Rossum, White and Cusack, and positively highlighted the handling of Frank's storyline. He ultimately gave the episode an "A" grade.

Carlo Sobral of Paste gave the episode a 9.4 out of 10 rating, praising the performances (particularly Rossum, White and Macy) and the dramatic elements of the episode. In his review, Sobral ultimately concluded ""Iron City" triumphs as its strongest installment so far, pulling off an intense aftermath episode that leaves even more questions on the table for the future." Andy Greenwald of Grantland lauded the episode, calling it "emblematic of all the things that make Shameless very good and occasionally close to great: the lack of sentimentality, the way the show never judges its characters. It merely chronicles their actions with great empathy and care."

David Crow of Den of Geek gave the episode a perfect 5 star rating out of 5 and wrote, "This is hands-down the best Shameless we’ve had all season and is a contender for one of the series' greatest. This week's "Iron City" reminds us once again just how impossible it is to categorize Shameless as anything other than sometimes brilliant." Crow commended Rossum's performance, writing "Last week, I applauded the actress’ ability to find the truth in a complete breakdown of total failure during the episode's final moments, and tonight was a 50-minute encore of that moment." Leigh Raines of TV Fanatic gave the episode a 4.5 star rating out of 5, and wrote, "The end of Episode 5 was a frightening and awful situation that left Liam in the ICU and Fiona in handcuffs. [This episode] only solidified the fact that Fiona is never going to forget that she almost let her baby brother die."

=== Accolades ===
TVLine named Emmy Rossum as the "Performer of the Week" for the week of February 22, 2014, for her performance in the episode. The site wrote, "Fiona has always been good at playing the system to get the bare minimum needed to survive. But in this episode, she became an object of the system, with no control over her circumstances. And while it was a truly ugly and awful situation for Fiona, it brought out the best in Rossum."
