= My Oldest Daughter =

- Shameless episode
- Episode no.: Season 4 Episode 2
- Directed by: Mimi Leder
- Written by: Nancy M. Pimental
- Cinematography by: Kevin McKnight
- Editing by: Tim Tommasino
- Original release date: January 19, 2014
- Running time: 49 minutes

Guest appearances
- Vanessa Bell Calloway as Carol Fisher; Johanna Braddy as Shelley; James Allen McCune as Matty Baker; Adam Cagley as Ron Kuzner; Shane Edelman as Attorney; Kimberly Hébert Gregory as Nurse; Alison Haislip as Doctor; Tate Hanyok as Gabrielle Polestein; Roger Hewlett as Leonard; Cherami Leigh as Robyn Hasseck; Michael Patrick McGill as Tommy; Kerry O'Malley as Kate; Teresa Ornelas as Ellie; Jonathan Schmock as Alan Kopcheck; Corey Sorenson as Dr. Johnson; Danika Yarosh as Holly Herkimer

Episode chronology
← Previous "Simple Pleasures"	Next → "Like Father, Like Daughter"
- Shameless season 4

"My Oldest Daughter" is the second episode of the fourth season of the American television comedy drama Shameless, an adaptation of the British series of the same name. It is the 38th overall episode of the series and was written by executive producer Nancy M. Pimental and directed by Mimi Leder. It originally aired on Showtime on January 19, 2014.

The series is set on the South Side of Chicago, Illinois, and depicts the poor, dysfunctional family of Frank Gallagher, a neglectful single father of six: Fiona, Phillip, Ian, Debbie, Carl, and Liam. He spends his days drunk, high, or in search of money, while his children need to learn to take care of themselves. In the episode, Fiona enjoys the benefits of her new life, while Kevin receives a surprise while reading Stan's will.

According to Nielsen Media Research, the episode was seen by an estimated 1.60 million household viewers and gained a 0.8 ratings share among adults aged 18–49. The episode received critical acclaim, with critics praising the performances, storylines, character development and twist ending.

== Plot ==
Now able to pay for insurance, Fiona (Emmy Rossum) decides to take Debbie (Emma Kenney), Carl (Ethan Cutkosky) and Liam for regular medical check-ups. Debbie expresses interest in going on the pill, to Fiona's dismay, while Carl unsuccessfully tries to use the visit to get prescriptions for Frank (William H. Macy), who is trying different methods to get alcohol in his system.

Kevin, (Steve Howey) and Stan's son, Alan (Jonathan Schmock), meet with Stan's lawyer to read his will. While Stan leaves some belongings to Alan, they are shocked when Stan gives the Alibi Room to Kevin. Alan is upset, but decides to not interfere, instead asking for a monthly fee for two years. Kevin is ecstatic over the news, until Kate (Kerry O'Malley) reveals that Stan left the bar in a heavy debt. As Kevin debates on his new debts, Veronica (Shanola Hampton) discovers that she is pregnant with triplets, and she tells Carol (Vanessa Bell Calloway) to abort her child; Carol and Kevin refuse. Lip (Jeremy Allen White) continues struggling in college, and he decides to get tutoring for extra credits. At a college party, Lip tries to flirt with some girls, but they all reject his advances.

Mike (Jake McDorman) allows Fiona to use a company car to make a sale. Fiona manages to impress the client, but on the drive back to work, she gets into an argument with a man in another vehicle. When she insults him back, the man exits his car and shatters her car's windshield with a baseball bat, forcing her to flee. Fiona later tells Mike about the event, but claims it was an accident. Meanwhile, Carl decides to go to the hospital to ask for help regarding Frank's condition. The receptionist explains that Frank needs a liver, but the wait for a donor will be long unless a family member with the same blood match as Frank donates a portion of their liver. With Fiona unwilling to help Frank with his condition, Carl retrieves a bloody tampon from the bathroom and gives it to a receptionist to confirm if Fiona is a blood match.

Debbie continues spending more time with Matty (James Allen McCune), and she accepts an invitation to his apartment. Upon discovering that Matt is actually 20 years old, Debbie says she is 13, but Matty is still interested in becoming her friend. Mike takes Fiona home and reveals that he knows about the road rage incident, causing an argument. Mike gets her to promise not to lie, for the sake of their relationship. As Fiona enters, Carl asks her to donate her liver, as she shares the same blood type as Frank. Fiona refuses, causing Carl to storm off. Frank then declares that he will ask his other daughter for help, and shocks Fiona by revealing that he is referring to his oldest daughter, Samantha.

== Production ==
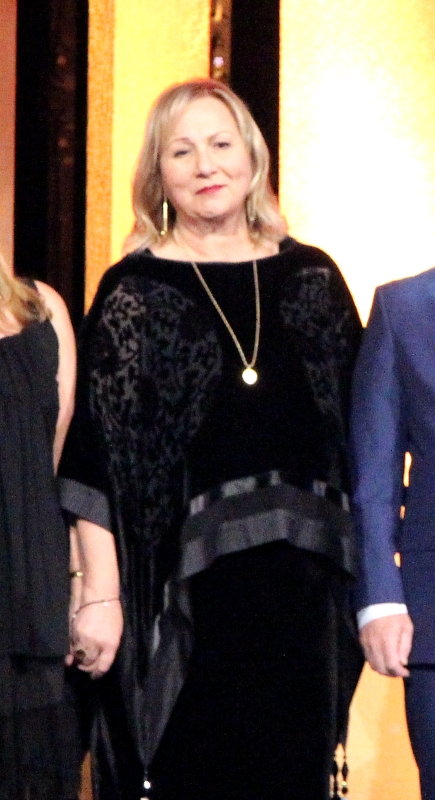
The episode was directed by Mimi Leder.

The episode was written by executive producer Nancy M. Pimental and directed by Mimi Leder. It was Pimental's ninth writing credit, and Leder's fourth directing credit.

== Reception ==
=== Viewers ===
In its original American broadcast, "My Oldest Daughter" was seen by an estimated 1.60 million household viewers with a 0.8 in the 18–49 demographics. This means that 0.8 percent of all households with televisions watched the episode. This was a slight decrease in viewership from the previous episode, which was seen by an estimated 1.69 million household viewers with a 0.9 in the 18–49 demographics.

=== Critical reviews ===
"My Oldest Daughter" received critical acclaim. Joshua Alston of The A.V. Club gave the episode an "A–" grade and wrote, ""Simple Pleasures" was a slight downshift, but considering the show's established start-slow pacing, it was an auspicious beginning to season four that solidified the Shameless streak. So it's not surprising that "My Oldest Daughter" worked incredibly well, but why it worked so well is a little curious." Alston praised Fiona's storyline, writing "The Fiona story has basically everything I want from a Fiona story, and gave Emmy Rossum an opportunity to display all of the character’s best and worst qualities."

Carlo Sobral of Paste gave the episode an 8.2 out of 10 rating and wrote "After last week's Shameless premiere lacked many of the series' previous regular characters, I expected us to catch up with some of them this week. Instead, we saw an even more narrowly focused episode with "My Oldest Daughter." [...] With fewer characters to follow and fewer storylines going on, the beginning of season 4 has been arguably more focused than in the past."

David Crow of Den of Geek gave the episode a 3.5 star rating out of 5 and wrote, "There is no shame in keeping secrets, if they can remain hidden. However, when they bubble to the surface like they did for Frank and Fiona on tonight's Shameless, it can create for some hilarious, if genuinely embarrassing moments." Crow was mixed over the episode's cliffhanger, writing "this sort of fourth season reveal could be the sign of desperation as played out in generic family sitcoms when they need to revitalize the cutsey dynamics every five years or so. Then again, Shameless COULD use some new blood in it." Leigh Raines of TV Fanatic gave the episode a 4.5 star rating out of 5, and wrote, "Sometimes you just can't escape your roots, upbringing, family, the ties that bind, etc. It's the reason I'm not sure Lip is going to last that much longer at college. Sure he's brilliant, but he's also not cut out for the typical path."
