= There's the Rub (disambiguation) =

There's the Rub is a 1974 album by Wishbone Ash.

There's the Rub may also refer to:

- "There's the rub", a phrase in "To be, or not to be" in Shakespeare's Hamlet
- "There's the Rub" (Shameless), a 2014 TV episode
- "There's the Rub", a 2002 TV episode of Gilmore Girls season 2
- You're Missing the Point or Ahí está el detalle (Spanish, 'There's the rub', literally 'There lies the detail'), a 1940 Mexican comedy film
