= Joseph Bergel =

Joseph Bergel or Bergl (2 September 1802, Prossnitz – 1885, Kaposvár) was a Hungarian medical doctor and writer. His most important work is Die Medizin der Talmudisten (Leipzig and Berlin, 1885), with an appendix on anthropology as it is found in ancient Hebrew writings.

He was well versed in rabbinical and modern Hebrew literature, and attempted to introduce a new meter into Hebrew poetry in a work he published under the title Pirḥe Leshon 'Eber (Hebrew songs), Gross-Kanizsa, 1873.

In German he wrote:

- Studien über die Naturwissenschaftlichen Kenntnisse der Talmudisten, Leipzig, 1880
- Die Eheverhältnisse der Alten Juden im Vergleich mit den Griechischen und Römischen, ib. 1881
- Der Himmel und Seine Wunder, eine Archäologische Studie nach Alten Jüdischen Mythografien, which was also published in Leipzig in the same year under the title Mythologie der Alten Hebräer, 1882

These works are not profound, but they bring together a certain amount of useful information. Bergel also wrote Geschichte der Juden in Ungarn, published in 1879 in Hungarian and German.

== See also ==
- Bergel
- Bergl
