= Bergl =

Bergl is a surname. Notable people with the surname include:

- Emily Bergl (born 1975), English-American actress
- Joe Bergl (1901–1950), American car mechanic
- Maurice Bergl (1917–2009), English table tennis player

== See also ==
- Bergel
- Bergling
