= Bergel Rock =

Bergel Rock (65°10′S 64°58′W) is a rock nearly 1 nautical mile (1.9 km) south of Quintana Island in the southwestern Wilhelm Archipelago. It was named by the UK Antarctic Place-Names Committee for Alexandra Bergel, a granddaughter of Sir Ernest Shackleton, and a sponsor for HMS Endurance which made surveys in this area in February 1969.
