= Bergel =

Bergel is a surname. Notable people with the surname include:

- Erich Bergel (1930–1998), Romanian musician
- Joseph Bergel (1802–1885), Hungarian physician and author
- Erich Bergel (1930–1998), Hungarian flutist and conductor
- Bergel, Hungarian noble house

Bergel Rock is a geographic location in the Antarctic, named for Alexandra Bergel, granddaughter of Sir Earnest Shackleton
