= Bergling =

Bergling is a Swedish surname. Notable people with the surname include:

- Birger Bergling (1903–1973), Swedish scenographer and costume designer
- Stig Bergling (1937–2015), Swedish Security Service officer
- Tim Bergling (better known as Avicii, 1989–2018), Swedish musician, DJ, remixer and record producer

== See also ==
- Bergl
