= Alex/October =

- Directed by: Josh Hope
- Written by: Josh Hope
- Produced by: Lisa Freberg
- Starring: Brad Hunt; Tara Shayne; Ethan Cutkosky
- Production company: One Good Man Productions
- Distributed by: DeskPop Entertainment
- Release date: September 30, 2022
- Country: United States
- Language: English

Alex/October is a 2022 American drama film written and directed by Josh Hope and starring Brad Hunt, Tara Shayne and Ethan Cutkosky.

== Cast ==
- Brad Hunt as Alex
- Tara Shayne as October
- Ethan Cutkosky as Josh
- Stacy Edwards as Sara
- Rivkah Reyes as Cait

== Production ==
In November 2019, it was announced that Cutkosky was cast in the film.

== Release ==
In August 2022, it was announced that DeskPop Entertainment secured worldwide rights to the film, which was released in select theaters and on VOD and digital on September 30, 2022.

== Reception ==
Alan Ng of Film Threat rated the film an 8 out of 10.
