= Quintana Island =

Island in Wilhelm Archipelago, Antarctica

Coordinates: 65°9′S 64°57′W

Quintana Island is a small isolated island, lying 10 km (6 mi) northeast of Betbeder Islands in the southwest part of the Wilhelm Archipelago. It was first charted as a group of islands by the French Antarctic Expedition, 1903–05, and named by Charcot for Manuel Quintana, then President of Argentina. A survey in 1957–58 by the British Naval Hydrographic Survey Unit found only one island in this position.

== See also ==
- List of Antarctic and sub-Antarctic islands
