= Nick Gehlfuss =

American actor

- Born: Nicholas Gehlfuss; January 21, 1985 (age 41); Cleveland, Ohio, U.S.
- Education: Marietta College (B.F.A.); University of Missouri-Kansas City (M.F.A.)
- Occupation: Actor
- Years active: 2007-present
- Spouse: Lilian Matsuda (m. 2016)
- Children: 2

Nicholas Gehlfuss (born January 21, 1985) is an American actor, known for his role in 2014 as Robbie Pratt in the fourth season of the Showtime family comedy-drama Shameless. From 2015–2023 he had a starring role as Dr. Will Halstead in the NBC medical drama Chicago Med. Since 2026, he had a starring role as FBI Special Agent Bill Goodman in the CBS crime drama CIA.

== Career ==
In 2014, Gehlfuss had a recurring role as Robbie Pratt in the fourth season of the Showtime family comedy-drama Shameless. In 2015, he guest-starred as Dr. Thomas Galen in the short-lived NBC horror drama Constantine in the penultimate episode "Angels and Ministers of Grace".

Later that year, Gehlfuss was cast in the NBC medical drama Chicago Med as Dr. Will Halstead. Halstead was first introduced in the police procedural drama Chicago P.D. as the older brother of Jesse Lee Soffer's character Detective Jay Halstead and afterwards, the drama Chicago Fire's backdoor pilot for Chicago Med.

== Personal life ==
Gehlfuss was born in Cleveland, Ohio and raised in Little Italy and Chesterland, Ohio. He holds a Bachelor of Fine Arts from Marietta College and completed his Master of Fine Arts at University of Missouri-Kansas City. He has two younger siblings: Vincent and Jillian.

On May 13, 2016, Gehlfuss married hotel marketer Lilian Matsuda.

== Filmography ==
=== Film ===
Year	Title	Role	Notes
2009	Sam Steele and the Junior Detective Agency	Martinson Radio	Voice
2013	In Lieu of Flowers	Mitch	
2014	Love & Mercy	Bruce Johnston	
2016	Equity	Gabe	
TBA	Butterfly in the Typewriter	Joel Fletcher	Pre-production

=== Television ===
Year	Title	Role	Notes
2010	Army Wives	Sergeant Joe Corey	Episode: "Murder in Charleston"
2011	The Good Wife	Jesse	Episode: "Breaking Up"
2011	The Wingman	Nick	Episode: "Nick"
2011	Blue Bloods	Jimmy the Bookie	Episode: "Thanksgiving"
2012	Person of Interest	Jack Hughes	Episode: "Masquerade"
2013	The Glades	Randy Dillard	Episode: "Glade-iators!"
2013	Rizzoli & Isles	Jack Roberts	Episode: "No One Mourns the Wicked"
2013	The Newsroom	Ross Kessler	Recurring role
2014	Shameless	Robbie Pratt	Recurring role
2014	Longmire	Cameron Maddox	Recurring role
2014	Murder in the First	Mark Strauss	Recurring role
2014	Clememtine	Sebastian	TV movie
2014	Royal Pains	Lance	Episode: "Smoke and Mirrors"
2014	Constantine	Dr. Thomas Galen	Episode: "Angels and Ministers of Grace"
2015	It's Always Sunny in Philadelphia	Sean	Episode: "The Gang Group Dates"
2015	Power	Lee	Guest
2015	The Mystery of Matter: Search for the Elements	Glenn Seaborg	Episode: "Into the Atom"
2015–2023	Chicago P.D.	Dr. Will Halstead	Recurring role
2015–2023	Chicago Fire	Dr. Will Halstead	Recurring role
2015–2023 & 2025	Chicago Med	Dr. Will Halstead	Main role; seasons 1-8, guest; season 11
2026–present	CIA	FBI Special Agent Bill Goodman	Main role
