= Isidora Goreshter =

American actress (born 1981)

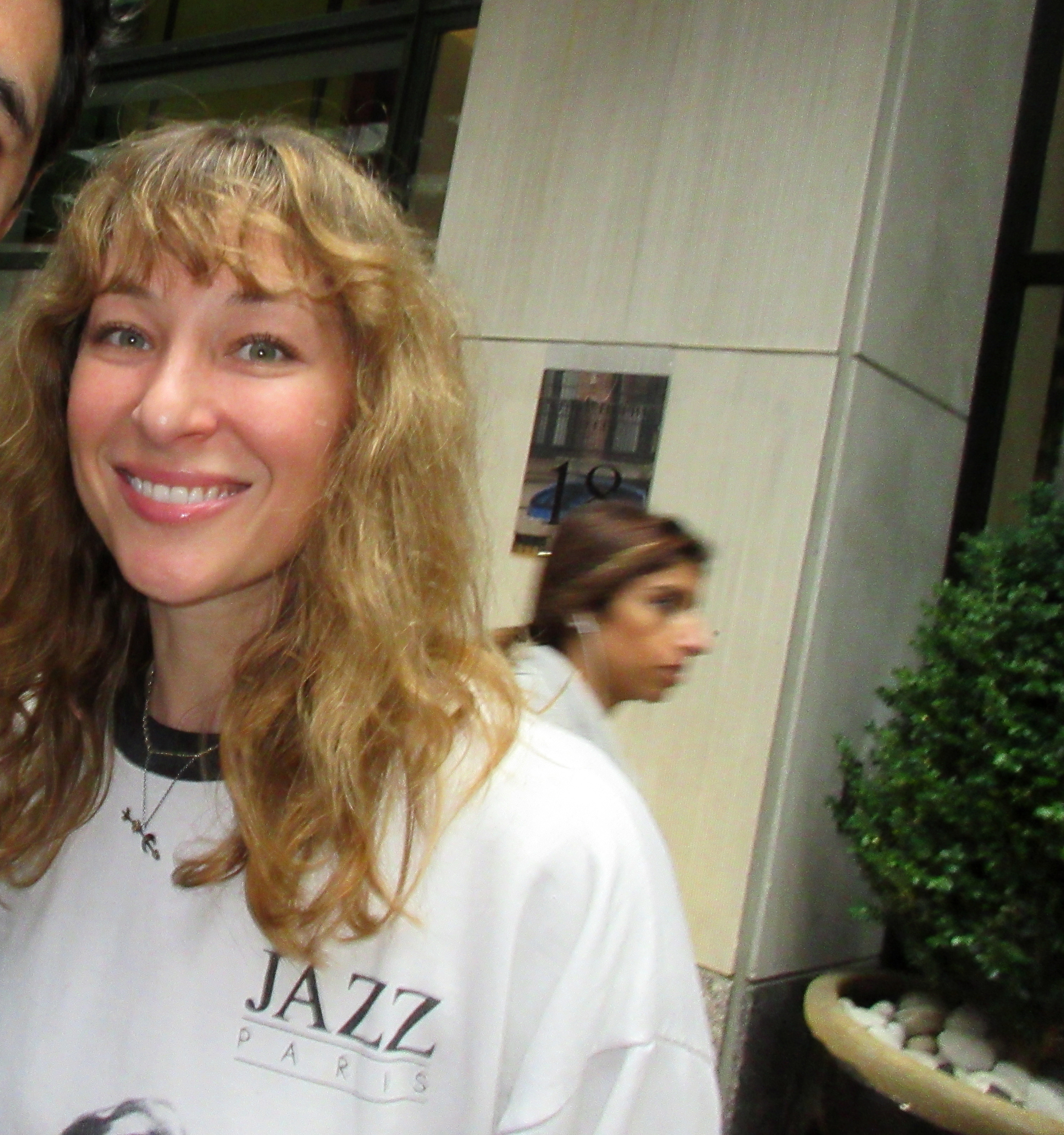
- Goreshter in 2019
- Born: October 24, 1981 (age 44); Long Beach, California, U.S.
- Occupation: Actress
- Years active: 2008–present

Isidora Goreshter (born October 24, 1981) is an American actress. She is best known for portraying Svetlana on the American TV series Shameless from seasons 3 to 8.

== Early life ==
Goreshter was born and raised in Long Beach, California, where she began performing on stage at age three. She studied classical ballet.

Goreshter competed in gymnastics as a child. She earned first place in beam, second place in vault and floor, and third place all-around in her age group at the California State Cup Championship in 1992. Also in 1992, she came in second place overall in her age group at the Central Pacific Championships. She graduated from Long Beach State with degrees in Art History and Theatre.

== Personal life ==
Goreshter was the first member of her family born in the United States. Goreshter's family is from the former Soviet Union. Two of Goreshter's grandparents are from Orhei, Moldova.

Goreshter studied acting at the Stella Adler acting conservatory. She appeared in such stage shows productions as Beirut, The Smell of the Kill, Waiting for Lefty, Laundry and Bourbon, and Waiting for Godot. She has degrees in theatre and art history.

== Career ==
Goreshter made her film debut with a small role in the motion picture Paranoia, starring Harrison Ford, Gary Oldman and Liam Hemsworth. She then took supporting roles in the films T is for Twig, A Leading Man and the award-winning short Wonder Girls.

In 2013, Goreshter guest starred in the television series Shameless as the prostitute Svetlana. At first meant to be a short-term character, Goreshter became a series regular in 2016. She left after season 8.

Goreshter went on to a lead role in the film Petal Pushers and had a major role opposite Noël Wells and Joe Pantoliano in Happy Anniversary.

== Filmography ==
=== Film ===
| Year | Title | Role | Notes |
|---|---|---|---|
| 2008 | Deader Living Through Chemistry | Lana | Video short |
| 2009 | Ma Cité, Mon Histoire | Margie | Short |
| 2010 | Birds of a Feather | Dancer | TV movie |
| 2011 | Birds of a Feather | Dancer | |
| 2011 | Double Black | Mead | Short |
| 2012 | Paying for It | Sophie | Short |
| 2012 | T is for Twig | Lina | Short |
| 2012 | 1 Nighter | Bubbles | Short |
| 2012 | The Skinny | Trainer | Short |
| 2012 | Oscar's Escape | Sophie | Short |
| 2013 | Paranoia | Hospital Nurse #1 | |
| 2013 | A Leading Man | Morgan Tucker | |
| 2013 | The Wonder Girls | Kornelia | Short |
| 2014 | No Names | Jules | Short |
| 2017 | Trouble | Young Maggie | |
| 2017 | How We Work 8 | Erica | Short |
| 2018 | Clara's Ghost | Adelia | |
| 2018 | Happy Anniversary | Georgia | |
| 2019 | The Petal Pushers | Ceil | |
| 2020 | The Five Rules of Success | Emma | |
| 2023 | The Portrait | | |

=== Television ===
| Year | Title | Role | Notes |
|---|---|---|---|
| 2012 | 2 Broke Girls | Elena | Episode: "And the Pearl Necklace" |
| 2012 | Ben and Kate | Woman #3 | Episode: "The Trip" |
| 2013–2018 | Shameless | Svetlana Milkovich | Guest (season 3) |
| 2013–2018 | Shameless | Svetlana Milkovich | Recurring (seasons 4–6) |
| 2013–2018 | Shameless | Svetlana Milkovich | Main (seasons 7–8); 53 episodes |
| 2019 | Grey's Anatomy | Paula | Episode: "Whistlin' Past the Graveyard" |
| 2021 | Condor | Kat Gnezdy | HBO Max |
| 2026 | The Drop: A Snowfall Saga | Jenny Favarella | Recurring |
