= Noel Fisher =

Canadian actor (born 1984)

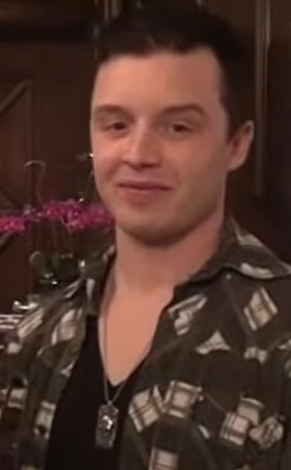
- Born: Noel Roeim Fisher; March 13, 1984 (age 42); Vancouver, British Columbia, Canada
- Occupation: Actor
- Years active: 1999–present
- Spouse: Layla Alizada (m. 2017)

Noel Roeim Fisher (born March 13, 1984) is a Canadian actor. He is known for his portrayal of Mickey Milkovich on the Showtime series Shameless, as well as his portrayal of Cael Malloy on the FX series The Riches. He played Ellison "Cotton Top" Mounts in the Emmy Award-winning miniseries Hatfields & McCoys, bully Troy McGinty in Max Keeble's Big Move (2001), Vladimir, a 1,500-year-old vampire in The Twilight Saga: Breaking Dawn – Part 2 (2012), and Michelangelo in Teenage Mutant Ninja Turtles (2014) and its sequel Teenage Mutant Ninja Turtles: Out of the Shadows (2016). Fisher has also acted in shows such as Criminal Minds: Suspect Behavior, Lie to Me, Law & Order: Special Victims Unit and Bones.

== Early life ==
Fisher was born on 13 March 1984 in Vancouver, British Columbia. He began his acting career at the age of 14 in the television film The Sheldon Kennedy Story. During his time as a young actor in Vancouver, he was encouraged to "take many different classes". Fisher "fell in love" with piano, which he studied for eight years.

== Career ==
Fisher began his acting career at age 14. He debuted in 1999 with The Sheldon Kennedy Story, a sports drama film about ice hockey player Sheldon Kennedy. His performance landed Fisher his first Gemini Awards nomination for Best Supporting Actor in a Drama Program or Series at the 15th Gemini Awards. He also starred as Freddie in season 1 of Two and a Half Men in 2004. He gained a second Gemini nomination in the same category with the TV series Godiva's in 2005. He played Brian Gibbons in Final Destination 2 in 2003, one of his first roles in an American film. From 2007, Fisher became more known by the public due to the FX series The Riches, portraying Cael Malloy, the conniving and clever son of Wayne (Eddie Izzard) and Dahlia (Minnie Driver).

Fisher has received critical acclaim for playing Mickey Milkovich, a gay thug character on Shameless from 2011 to 2021. In 2014, Vanity Fair named his relationship with Cameron Monaghan's Ian Gallagher the best-written gay couple on television. Though Fisher is straight, his sexuality is often questioned in interviews. He has responded to the controversy:

I don't look at Mickey as a gay character. I look at him as a person, who happens to be gay. I think it's weird how we, as a society, try to put the LGBT community in a box, when in fact, they are just people. They have the same complexities as you and me. That's how I look at Mickey, as a complex person.

In 2017, Fisher starred in the National Geographic docuseries The Long Road Home. He played Pfc. Tomas Young, the Iraq War veteran who famously became a war protester after being paralyzed during an ambush only days after being sent to fight overseas. Fisher told creator Mikko Alanne he would not accept the part unless he could meet with Young's family; "That's how committed he was to doing it right".

Fisher played Ellison "Cotton Top" Mounts in the award-winning miniseries Hatfields & McCoys as well as Vladimir, a 1,500-year old vampire in The Twilight Saga: Breaking Dawn – Part 2 and Michelangelo in Teenage Mutant Ninja Turtles and its sequel Teenage Mutant Ninja Turtles: Out of the Shadows. In May 2020, he starred opposite Tom Hardy in the Al Capone biopic Capone as Junior, Capone's son. He starred in the limited CBS series The Red Line and had a recurring role in the Hulu series Castle Rock. He also had roles in Bones, Law & Order: Special Victims Unit, Fear the Walking Dead and The Conners and A Dog Named Christmas.

== Personal life ==
Since November 2004, Fisher has been in a relationship with actress Layla Alizada. The couple got engaged in 2014, and were married on July 15, 2017.

== Filmography ==
=== Film ===
Year	Title	Role	Notes
2001	Valentine	Tulga Gang Member #1	
2001	Freddy Got Fingered	Pimply Manager	
2001	Max Keeble's Big Move	Troy McGinty	
2003	A Guy Thing	Acne-Faced Teen	
2003	Final Destination 2	Brian Gibbons	
2003	Agent Cody Banks	Fenster	
2006	Pope Dreams	Pete	
2007	After Sex	Jay	
2008	Red	Danny McCormack	
2009	A dog named Christmas	Todd McCray	
2010	Black Hole	Davey	Short film
2011	Battle: Los Angeles	Pfc. Shaun Lenihan	
2011	Thule	Amn. Jim Parker	Short film
2011	Commerce	Pete	Short film
2012	The Twilight Saga: Breaking Dawn – Part 2	Vladimir	
2014	Teenage Mutant Ninja Turtles	Michelangelo (voice)	Also motion capture
2015	Batman Unlimited: Monster Mayhem	Gogo Shoto (voice)	
2016	Teenage Mutant Ninja Turtles: Out of the Shadows	Michelangelo (voice)	Also motion capture
2016	Sully	Andrew Carrigan	
2017	A Yeti Adventure	Simon Picard (voice)	
2018	Racetime	Zac (voice)	
2019	Justice League vs. the Fatal Five	Brainiac 5 (voice)	
2020	Capone	Junior Capone	
2025	C.O.G.	Ethan	previously titled as CognAItive

=== Television ===
Year	Title	Role	Notes
1999	The Sheldon Kennedy Story	Young Sheldon Kennedy	Television film
2000	2gether	Skater #1	Television film
2000	Ratz	James	Television film
2000	High Noon	Billy	Television film
2000	2gether: The Series	Gary Long	Episode: "Waxed"
2000	Just Deal	Short Kid	Episode: "The Right Question"
2000–2001	You, Me and the Kids	Aaron	10 episodes
2000–2003	X-Men: Evolution	Todd Tolansky/Toad (voice)	24 episodes
2001	Andromeda	Breyon	Episode: "Music of a Distant Drum"
2001	The Outer Limits	Brae	Episode: "Lion's Den"
2001	Sk8	Alex	Episode: "The Map"
2002	Glory Days	Robbie McNiel	Episode: "The Devil Made Me Do It"
2002	Hamtaro	Stan (voice)	38 episodes
2002	I Was a Teenage Faust	Tom	Television film
2002	Killer Bees	Dylan Harris	Television film
2003	A Wrinkle in Time	It Boy	Television film
2003	Lightning: Bolts of Destruction	Jeremy Landis	Television film
2003	Thanksgiving Family Reunion	Buzz Hodge	Television film
2004	Two and a Half Men	Freddie	Episode: "Camel Filters and Pheromones"
2004	Fillmore!	Bri-Dog (voice)	Episode: "A Dark Score Evened"
2004	Renegadepress.com	Vince	Episode: "Too Cool"
2004	Cold Case	Jerry Kasher	Episode: "The Plan"
2004	Huff	Sam Johnson	3 episodes
2005–2006	Godiva's	TJ	19 episodes
2006	Medium	Jessie Andrews/Brian DuBois	Episode: "Sweet Child O' Mine"
2006	Standoff	Owen Johnson	Episode: "Peer Group"
2007–2008	The Riches	Cael Malloy	20 episodes
2008	Law & Order: Criminal Intent	Milo	Episode: "Reunion"
2008	Life	John Armstrong	Episode: "Find Your Happy Place"
2008	The Mentalist	Travis Tennant	Episode: "Seeing Red"
2009	Bones	Teddy Parker	Episode: "The Hero in the Hold"
2009	Law & Order: Special Victims Unit	Dale Stuckey	4 episodes
2009	A Dog Named Christmas	Todd McCray	Television film
2010	The Pacific	Pvt. Hamm	Episode: "Okinawa"
2010	Dark Blue	Pete	Episode: "Jane Wayne"
2010	Terriers	Adam Fisher	Episode: "Missing Persons"
2010	Lie to Me	Brian	Episode: "The Canary's Song"
2011	Criminal Minds: Suspect Behavior	Jason Wheeler	Episode: "One Shot Kill"
2011–2021	Shameless	Mickey Milkovich	68 episodes
2012	Hatfields & McCoys	Ellison "Cotton Top" Mounts	3 episodes
2012	The Booth at the End	Dillon	5 episodes
2016–2017	Justice League Action	Klarion the Witch Boy (voice)	2 episodes
2017	Fear the Walking Dead	Willy	Episode: "Eye of the Beholder"
2017	The Long Road Home	Pfc. Tomas Young	8 episodes
2018	Castle Rock	Dennis Zalewski	6 episodes
2019	The Red Line	Officer Paul Evans	8 episodes
2020	The Conners	Ed Conner Jr.	3 episodes
2022	The Calling	Zack Miller	4 episodes
2025	The Rookie	Harrison Novak	3 episodes
