= James Allen McCune =

American actor and musician (born 1990)

- Born: June 18, 1990 (age 36); Atlanta, Georgia, U.S.
- Occupations: Actor, musician, guitarist
- Years active: 2011–present

James Allen McCune (born June 18, 1990) is an American actor and musician, best known for his roles on The Walking Dead, Shameless, Blair Witch, and his work with Sugar Pine 7.

== Life and career ==
He was born in Atlanta, Georgia, to Charlotte and Loren McCune. He started acting at 15 thanks to his high school's drama club "Echostage," where he performed in many plays and musicals. After high school, James Allen McCune played "Roger" in Fabrefaction Theatre's regional production of Rent in 2010 before starting work in film and television.

His most notable performances are as Jimmy in AMC's hit show The Walking Dead, Matty Baker on Shameless and James in the 2016 Blair Witch film.

He was a guest on Episode 43 of The Official Podcast.

In June 2023, McCune came out as Pansexual on Twitter.

== Filmography ==
=== Film ===
- 2013: Snitch — Craig
- 2013: Congratulations! — Graduate/Edward
- 2013: Only in L.A. — Jamie
- 2013: Pauline in a Beautiful World — Doug
- 2016: Blair Witch — James Donahue

=== Television ===
- 2011: Hail Mary — Thorton Tate
- 2011: Homeland — Jeff (1 episode)
- 2011–2012: The Walking Dead — Jimmy (recurring role; 10 episodes)
- 2013: The Anna Nicole Story — Tommy Smith (TV film)
- 2013: Gentlemen Callers — Alex
- 2014–2015: Shameless — Matty Baker
- 2018: How To Get Away With Murder— Josh Bathurst (Guest star; 1 episode)

=== Web series ===
- 2017–2019: Sugar Pine 7 — James Allen McCune/Himself
- 2017: The Official Podcast — James Allen McCune
- 2018: The Gus & Eddy Podcast — James Allen McCune
- 2018: The Gus & Eddy Podcast — Why Would You Boil Peanuts?
- 2019: The Gus & Eddy Podcast — Theme Park SpongeBob Has Muscular Legs
- 2019: The Official Podcast — With James Allen McCune
- 2019: Grey Area — (Ongoing video series by James Allen McCune)
- 2019: Funhaus — (Fowl Play - Untitled Goose Game Funny Moments)
- 2020: Funhaus — (The War On Drums - Dealer Simulator Gameplay)
- 2020: Funhaus — (Are You Smarter Than a YouTuber? - Demo Disk Gameplay)

=== Video game ===
- 2019: Days Gone — Wade Taylor
