= Emily Bergl =

British actress (born 1975)

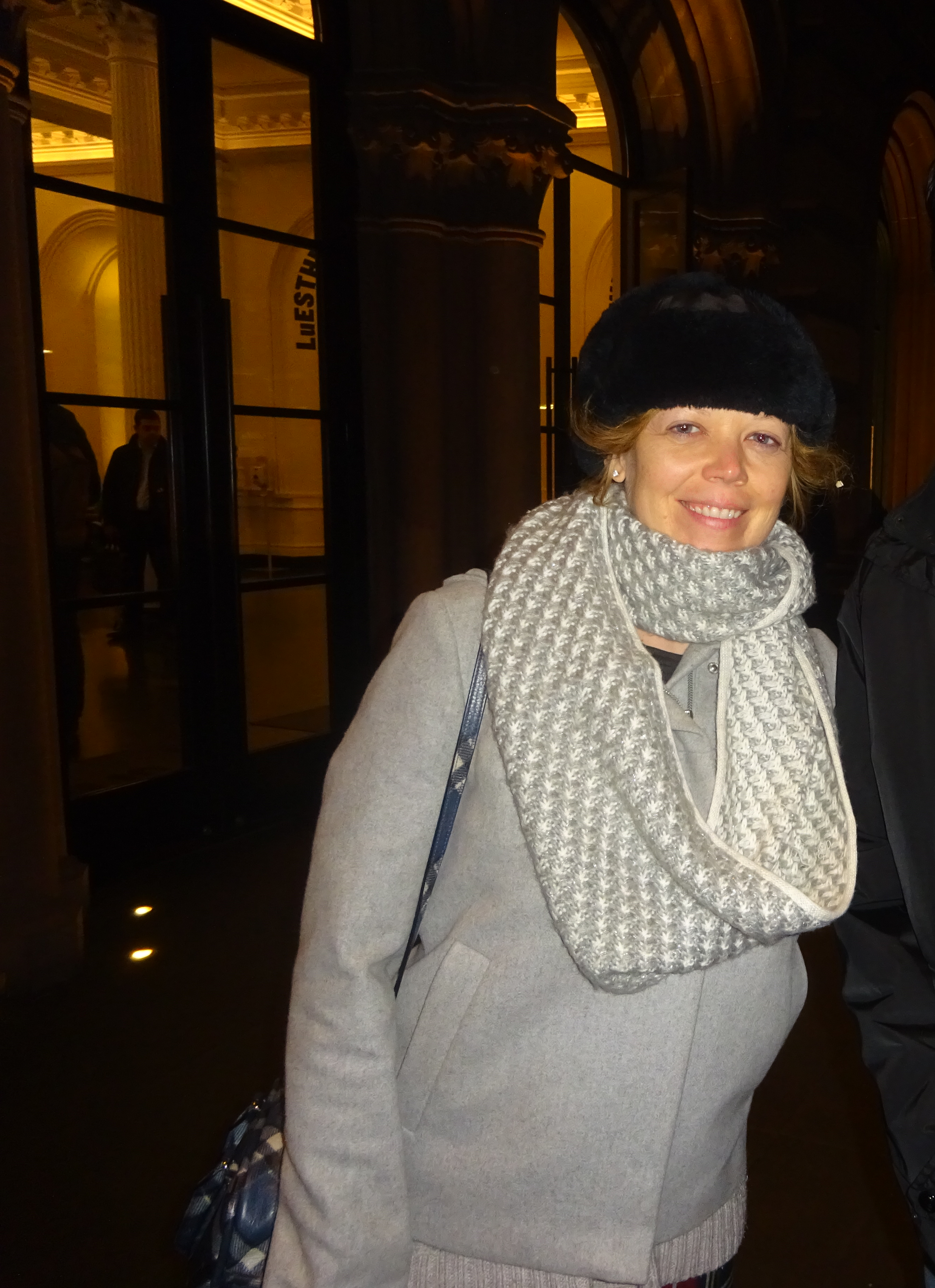
- Bergl in 2016
- Born: Anne Emily Bergl; 25 April 1975 (age 51); Milton Keynes, Buckinghamshire, England
- Education: Grinnell College (BA)
- Occupation: Actress
- Years active: 1995–present
- Children: 1
- Website: www.emilyberglofficial.com

Anne Emily Bergl (born 25 April 1975) is an English-born American actress. Bergl is known for her roles as Rachel Lang in the supernatural horror film The Rage: Carrie 2 (1999), Francie Jarvis on Gilmore Girls (2001–2003), Annie O'Donnell on the ABC series Men in Trees (2006–2008), Tammi Bryant on the TNT drama series Southland (2009–2013), Beth Young on Desperate Housewives (2010–2012), Sammi Slott on Shameless (2014–2015), Lilah Tanner on American Crime (2016–2017), and Tessie on The Marvelous Mrs. Maisel (2018–2023). She also performs as a cabaret singer.

== Early life and education ==
Bergl was born in Milton Keynes, Buckinghamshire, England, to an Irish mother and an English architect father. She has one brother. Bergl's family emigrated to the United States when she was six, initially residing in Denver, Colorado. When she was ten, they moved to Glenview, Illinois, where she spent the remainder of her upbringing. She attended Glenbrook South High School and Grinnell College, where she was the lead in several school productions. She graduated Phi Beta Kappa in 1997 with a Bachelor of Arts degree in English and theatre. During her college years, she spent a semester (spring 1996) studying with the National Theater Institute at The Eugene O'Neill Theater Center. She received additional acting training at HB Studio in New York City.

== Career ==
Bergl began acting in theater, appearing in a production of Romeo and Juliet opposite Neil Patrick Harris at San Diego's Old Globe Theatre in 1998. She then had the lead role of Rachel Lang in the 1999 film The Rage: Carrie 2, the sequel to the 1976 supernatural thriller Carrie. She has appeared in episodes of the TV shows Gilmore Girls, CSI: Miami, Medium, Law & Order: Criminal Intent, NYPD Blue, Grey's Anatomy and Star Trek: Enterprise. She also appeared in the psychological thriller Chasing Sleep, opposite star Jeff Daniels. She had a major role in the Steven Spielberg 2002 miniseries Taken.

From 2006 to 2008, Bergl had a significant co-starring role in the ABC series Men in Trees as Annie, an enthusiastic fan of the series' main character, played by Anne Heche.

In 2009, Bergl starred in Becky Shaw at Second Stage Theatre on Broadway in New York City.

From 2010 to 2012, Bergl played Paul Young's new wife, Beth, in the seventh season of Desperate Housewives.

From 2014 to 2015, Bergl played Sammi Slott on Shameless.

From 2016 to 2017, Bergl played Lilah Tanner on American Crime.

From 2018 to 2023, Bergl played Tessie on The Marvelous Mrs. Maisel.

In 2023, Bergl played June Levant in the Tony Award-winning Broadway play Good Night, Oscar, opposite Tony Award winner Sean Hayes as Oscar Levant.

In 2025, Bergl played Nina/Mary in the Broadway musical Just in Time, a jukebox musical featuring Tony Award winner Jonathan Groff as Bobby Darin.

=== Cabaret ===
In 2010–2011, Bergl performed a cabaret show called Kidding on the Square, which had a run in the summer of 2010 in Los Angeles and New York City, then later in Chicago. In September 2011, with the show in New York, The New York Times wrote of her performance:

Emily Bergl, an incandescent kewpie doll with a bright Betty Boop-inflected chirp, a defiant flounce and a sharp comedic edge, took the Oak Room of the Algonquin Hotel by storm on Tuesday evening. Her sensational show, "Kidding on the Square" may have played elsewhere, but arriving at the staid Oak Room it felt like a gust of fresh air that could knock you off your feet.

A later article elaborated on her cabaret acts.

== Acting credits ==
=== Film ===
Year	Title	Role	Notes
1999	The Rage: Carrie 2	Rachel Lang	
2000	Chasing Sleep	Sadie	
2001	Happy Campers	Talia	
2003	Final Draft	Helga	
2006	The Hard Easy	Natalie	
2009	Get the Dime	Kristy	Short
2009	Date Blind	Susan	Short
2012	Grassroots	Theresa Glendon	
2013	Blue Jasmine	Hal and Jasmine's Friend	
2013	I Know What I'm Doing	June Bennett	
2013	Eva	Eva	Short
2017	Miyubi	Cheryl	Short

=== Television ===
Year	Title	Role	Notes
1999	Wasteland	Corie	Episode: "Indian Summer"
2000	NYPD Blue	Anya Weiss	Episode: "Welcome to New York"
2000	ER	Gloria Milton	Episode: "May Day"
2001	Providence		3 episodes
2001–2003	Gilmore Girls	Francine "Francie" Jarvis	4 episodes
2002	Taken	Lisa Clarke	Miniseries
2003	The Wild Thornberrys	Lisa Soderblom (voice)	Episode: "Look Who's Squawking"
2003	Star Trek: Enterprise	Bethany	Episode: "North Star"
2004	CSI: Miami	Melanie Hines	Episode: "Blood Moon"
2006	Law & Order: Criminal Intent	Alice	Episode: "Vacancy"
2006–2008	Men in Trees	Annie O'Donnell	Main role
2008	The Governor's Wife	Dr. Heather McManus	Television film
2009	Medium	Victoria	Episode: "Things to Do in Phoenix When You're Dead"
2009	The Good Wife	Bree	2 episodes
2009–2013	Southland	Tammi Bryant	16 episodes
2010	Grey's Anatomy	Trisha	Episode: "Shiny Happy People"
2010–2012	Desperate Housewives	Beth Young	14 episodes
2011	Royal Pains	Nola Cadeau	2 episodes
2011	Hawaii Five-0	Rhea Carver	Episode: "Ua Lawe Wale"
2012	The Mentalist	Ms. Austin	Episode: "Something Rotten in Redmund"
2013	Warehouse 13	Autumn Radnor	Episode: "Parks and Rehabilitation"
2014	Elementary	Marion West	Episode: "Art in the Blood"
2014	The Knick	Mrs. Hemming	3 episodes
2014–2015	Shameless	Samantha "Sammi" Slott	Recurring role (season 4); main role (season 5)
2015	Law & Order: Special Victims Unit	Judith Briggs	Episode: "December Solstice"
2015	Scandal	Janet Beene	Episode: "Put a Ring on It"
2016	Gilmore Girls: A Year in the Life	Francine "Francie" Jarvis	Episode: "Spring"
2016–2017	American Crime	Lilah Tanner	9 episodes
2018	You	Nancy Whitesell	Episode: "The Captain"
2018	Mommy Blogger	Imogen	2 episodes
2018–2023	The Marvelous Mrs. Maisel	Tessie Myerson	8 episodes
2019	Mindhunter	Ms. Leland	2 episodes
2019	How to Get Away with Murder	Sally	Episode: "Say Goodbye"
2020	Dirty John	Marie Stewart	6 episodes
2022	FBI: Most Wanted	Becca McCann	Episode: "Patent Pending"
2026	Law & Order	Kate Leavy	Episode: "Never Say Goodbye"

=== Theatre ===
Year	Title	Role	Notes
1998	Romeo and Juliet	Juliet	Old Globe Theatre
2023	Good Night, Oscar	June Levant	Broadway
2025	Just in Time	Nina/Mary	Broadway

== Accolades ==
Bergl was nominated for two Saturn Awards by the Academy of Science Fiction, Fantasy and Horror Films: in 2000, for Best Performance by a Younger Actor/Actress for The Rage: Carrie 2 (1999); and in 2003, for Best Actress in a Television Series for Taken (2002). For her work in the Broadway musical Just in Time, she received a nomination for a Grammy Award for Best Musical Theater Album at the 68th Annual Grammy Awards.
