= Ethan Cutkosky =

American actor (born 1999)

- Born: Ethan Francis Cutkosky; August 19, 1999 (age 27); St. Charles, Illinois, U.S.
- Occupations: Actor; musician
- Years active: 2006–present
- Known for: Carl Gallagher in Shameless

Ethan Francis Cutkosky (born August 19, 1999) is an American actor and musician. He began as a child actor with his film debut in an uncredited supporting role in Fred Claus (2007) before acting in his first credited role in the supernatural horror film The Unborn (2009).

Cutkosky gained widespread recognition for his main role as Carl Gallagher on all eleven seasons of the Showtime comedy-drama television series Shameless (2011–2021). After Shameless, he starred in the film Alex/October (2022) and had a supporting role in the comedy film Happy Gilmore 2 (2025).

== Early life ==
Ethan Francis Cutkosky was born on August 19, 1999, in Campton Hills, Illinois, the only child of Yvonne Cabrera Cutkosky, a teacher, and David Cutkosky, a computer software engineer. His mother is of Mexican descent and his father is of Polish descent. He attended Bell Graham Elementary School in Campton Hills and Thompson Middle School in St. Charles, Illinois. He attended St. Charles East High School in St. Charles.

== Career ==
Cutkosky began appearing in photo ads when he was four years old as a way for his mother and him to spend time together. After being in a few advertisements he was asked to audition for commercials and then in movies. He landed his first film role playing Carl opposite Vince Vaughn in the Christmas comedy Fred Claus (2007), when he was eight years old. At nine, Cutkosky played a mythical spirit named Barto in the supernatural horror film The Unborn (2009), which starred Gary Oldman.

In 2009, Cutkosky was selected to play Carl Gallagher in the Showtime television series Shameless, the second youngest Gallagher sibling and biggest troublemaker. Shameless ran for 11 seasons until 2021, and is the longest running original scripted series in Showtime's history.

== Personal life ==
On November 6, 2017, Cutkosky was arrested for driving under the influence in Los Angeles. He accepted a plea deal and charges were dismissed. In an interview in 2021, Cutkosky reflects back on what happened, stating that he hadn't been smoking for hours while his friend had a joint in the back of the car. Furthermore, he continued that he tried to have a normal conversation while being sober. Cutkosky stated that he wanted the whole thing to die down since he hadn't even been active on social media back then.

== Filmography ==
=== Film ===
Year	Title	Role	Notes
2007	Fred Claus	Carl	Uncredited role
2009	The Unborn	Barto	
2010	Conviction	Neighborhood Boy	
2022	Alex/October	Josh	
2025	Going Places	Otis	Also co-producer
2025	Happy Gilmore 2	Wayne Gilmore	

=== Television ===
Year	Title	Role	Notes
2011–2021	Shameless	Carl Gallagher	Main role
2013–2026	Law & Order: Special Victims Unit	Henry Mesner	Episodes: "Born Psychopath" (2013) "Post-Graduate Psychopath" (2021) "Career Psychopath" (2026)
2020	Power	Young Thomas Egan	Episode: "Exactly How We Planned"
2022	The Conners	Caleb Goldufski	Episode: "Parent Traps and Heart Attacks"

== Discography ==
Year	Title	Album
2020	"Alone"	Non-album single
2020	"Comprehend"	Non-album single
2021	"Wondering"	Non-album single
2021	"Erase Me"	Non-album single
2023	"Falling Deep"	Non-album single
2023	"Anyway"	Non-album single
2023	"0ut 0f !t"	Non-album single
