= Steve Howey (actor) =

American actor (born 1977)

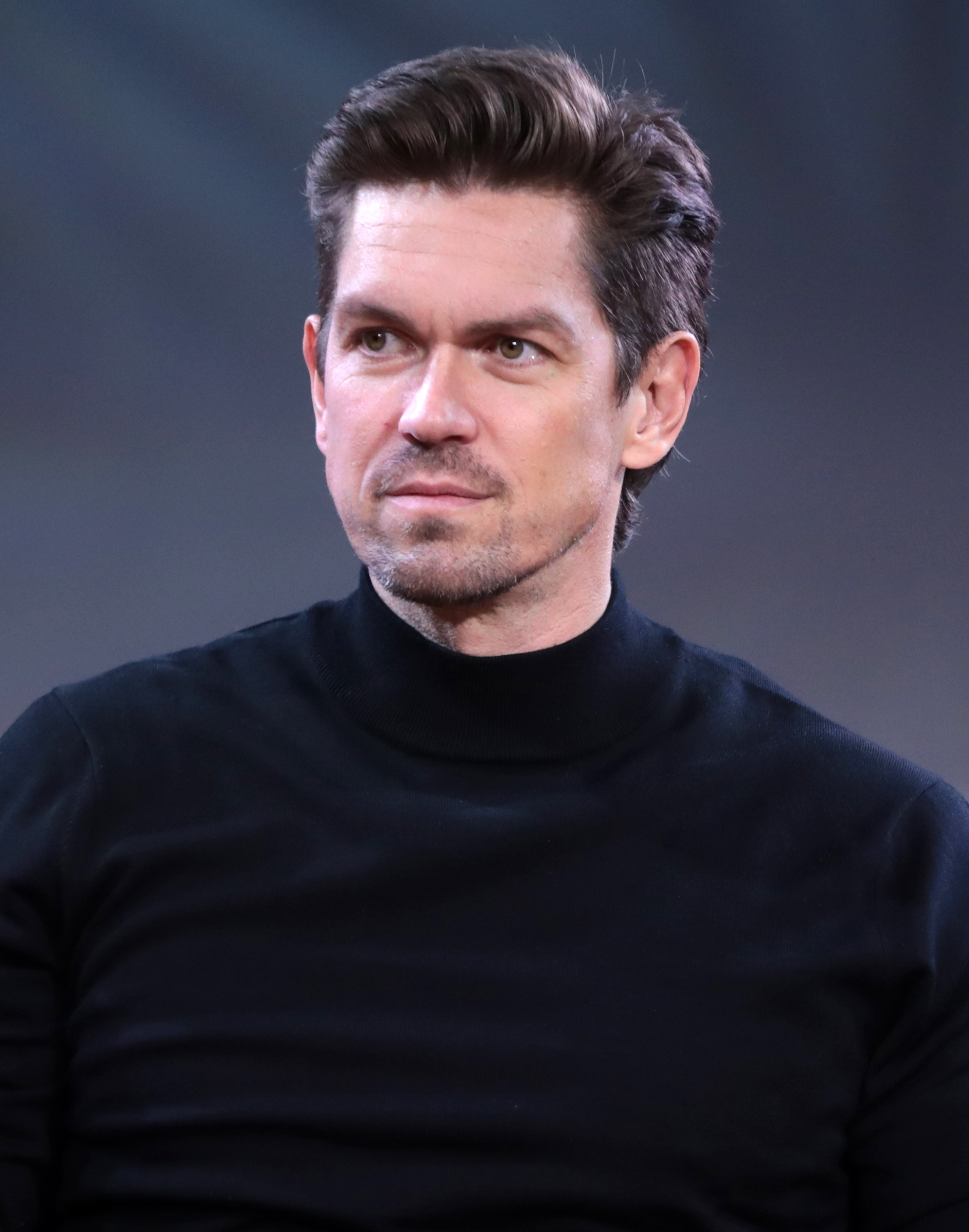
- Howey in 2023
- Born: Steven Michael Robert Howey; July 12, 1977 (age 49); San Antonio, Texas, U.S.
- Education: Northeastern Junior College
- Occupation: Actor
- Years active: 1994–present
- Spouse: Sarah Shahi (m. 2009; div. 2021)
- Children: 3

Steven Michael Robert Howey (born July 12, 1977) is an American actor. He was previously best known for his roles as Van Montgomery on The WB/The CW sitcom television series Reba and Kevin Ball on the Showtime series Shameless. From 2025 to 2026, he played Captain Nick Wagner on the ABC series High Potential. Howey has also appeared in the films Supercross, DOA: Dead or Alive, Bride Wars, Game Over, Man!, Day Shift and Something Borrowed.

== Early life and education ==
Steven Michael Robert Howey was born on July 12, 1977, in San Antonio, Texas. He has Scottish ancestry. He attended Crescenta Valley High School in La Crescenta, California, before graduating from Green Mountain High School in Lakewood, Colorado. He then attended Northeastern Junior College in Sterling, Colorado, for two years on a basketball scholarship. Howey later attended his father's acting workshop, where he decided to become an actor.

== Career ==
Howey has guest-starred on various TV shows including ER, The Drew Carey Show, and Psych . He also starred in and produced the independent film Class (1998), which was written and directed by his father, Bill Howey, and was accepted into the Denver International Film Festival.

In 2001, Howey got his first starring role in a series when he was cast as Van Montgomery in the show Reba. Howey stayed with the show until it ended in 2007. He also appeared in Reba McEntire's music video "Every Other Weekend" with his Reba co-star Joanna García.

In 2005, he starred in the action film Supercross as K.C. Carlyle, an MX racer. Howey also played Weatherby in the movie DOA: Dead or Alive, alongside Jaime Pressly and Eric Roberts. In 2009, he starred in Bride Wars, with Anne Hathaway and Kate Hudson (with whom he also starred in the 2011 movie Something Borrowed, once again as her love interest). Howey also portrayed the title role in the 2009 film, Stan Helsing. That same year, Howey also appeared in the web series CTRL playing Ben Piller. He has also appeared on the show Psych" episode "Thrill Seekers and Hell Raisers" as the character Derek Walker, a villainous river rafting guide and murderer.

In summer 2010, Howey joined the cast of the Showtime dramedy Shameless, as Kevin Ball, a series regular. Season 2 premiered January 8, 2012, with Howey remaining a main cast member. He then continued to play character Kevin Ball through the end of the show.

In 2013, Howey guest starred on an episode of Fox's New Girl entitled "TinFinity" as Jax, a professional football player and love interest of Jess (Zooey Deschanel).

In 2017, he guest-starred on Law & Order: Special Victims Unit in the episode "Intent" as Andy "The Monster" McPherson.

In 2024, he guest-starred on Happy's Place in the episode "Ho-Ho-Howey" as Danny (reuniting with McEntire and Melissa Peterman).

In 2026, he appeared as Garrett Graham's father and hockey star, Phil Graham, in the Amazon Prime series, Off Campus.

== Personal life ==
Howey was married to actress and model Sarah Shahi. The couple became engaged in June 2007, while vacationing in Hawaii and married on February 7, 2009, in Las Vegas. They have three children: a son born in July 2009 and twins, a daughter and a son, born in March 2015. Howey and Shahi filed for divorce in May 2020. Their divorce was finalized in January 2021.

== Filmography ==
=== Film ===
Year	Title	Role	Notes	Ref.
1998	Class	Jim	Also co-producer	
2005	Supercross	K.C. Carlyle		
2006	DOA: Dead or Alive	Weatherby		
2009	Bride Wars	Daniel Williams		
2009	Still Waiting...	Agnew	Direct-to-video film	
2009	Stan Helsing	Stan Helsing		
2011	Conception	Joel		
2011	Losing Control	Terry		
2011	Something Borrowed	Marcus		
2012	Monster Roll	Brody	Short film	
2013	Wrong Cops	Sandy / Michael		
2014	In Your Eyes	Bo Soames		
2015	See You in Valhalla	Makewi		
2016	Love on the Run	Rick		
2016	Unleashed	Sam / Summit		
2018	Game Over, Man!	Rich		
2018	Making Babies	John Kelly		
2019	Stuber	Felix		
2022	Day Shift	Mike Nazarian		

=== Television ===
Year	Title	Role	Notes	Ref.
1999	Pacific Blue	Mark Kerwin	Episode: "Silicone Valley of the Dolls"	
1999–2000	Totally Tooned In	Narrator	Unknown episodes	
2000	Get Real	Chris DeFalco	Episode: "Falling from Grace"	
2000	ER	Quarterback Elizey	Episode: "Homecoming"	
2000	The Drew Carey Show	Student	Episode: "Be Drew to Your School"	
2001	Any Day Now	Troy	Episode: "Everyone Deserves to be Loved"	
2001–2007	Reba	Van Montgomery	Main role; 125 episodes	
2006	Twins	Zack	Episode: "Blast from the Past"	
2007	The Beast	Ty Troop	Television film	
2008	Five Year Plan	Mickey	Television film	
2009	Surviving Suburbia	Brock	Episode: "Three End Tables"	
2009	Ctrl	Ben Piller	Main role; 10 episodes	
2010	State of Romance	Mike	Episode: "Pilot"	
2010	Psych	Derek	Episode: "Thrill Seekers and Hell Raisers"	
2011	Love Bites	Kell	Episode: "Firsts"	
2011–2021	Shameless	Kevin Ball	Main role; 134 episodes	
2013	New Girl	Jax McTavish	Episode: "Tinfinity"	
2013	Sons of Anarchy	Hopper	Recurring role; 3 episodes (season 6)	
2014	Jennifer Falls	Frank	Episode: "The Virginity Thief"	
2014	Where's This Party?	Marco Santini	Television film	
2015	Workaholics	Blue Knight DeMamp	Episode: "Gramps DeMamp Is Dead"	
2017	Blue & Green	Michiga'n	Television film	
2017	Law & Order: Special Victims Unit	Andy "Monster" McPherson	Episode: "Intent"	
2018	SEAL Team	Danny Cooper	Recurring role; 3 episodes (season 1)	
2019	Dead to Me	Jason	Episode: "I've Gotta Get Away"	
2023	True Lies	Harry Tasker	Main role; 13 episodes	
2024	Brilliant Minds	Wyatt James	Episode: "The Lost Biker"	
2024	Happy's Place	Danny	Episode: "Ho-Ho-Howey"	
2025–2026	High Potential	Nick Wagner	Main role; 11 episodes (season 2)	
2026	Off Campus	Phil Graham	Recurring role; 4 episodes	
2026	Ransom Canyon	Levi	Episode: "That Leaves Two"	
