= The Defenestration of Frank =

- Shameless episode
- Episode no.: Season 7 Episode 6
- Directed by: David Nutter
- Written by: Etan Frankel
- Cinematography by: Loren Yaconelli
- Editing by: John M. Valerio
- Original release date: November 6, 2016
- Running time: 58 minutes

Guest appearances
- June Squibb as Etta (special guest star); Alicia Coppola as Sue; Elliot Fletcher as Trevor; José Julián as Joaquin; Andrew Leeds as Micah; Pasha Lychnikoff as Yvon; Peter Macon as Luther Winslow; Ruby Modine as Sierra; Arden Myrin as Dollface Dolores; Zack Pearlman as Neil; Jaylen Barron as Dominique Winslow; Beth Payne as Mariana

Episode chronology
| ← Previous "Own Your Shit" | Next → "You'll Never Ever Get a Chicken in Your Whole Entire Life" |
- Shameless season 7

"The Defenestration of Frank" is the sixth episode of the seventh season of the American television comedy drama Shameless, an adaptation of the British series of the same name. It is the 78th overall episode of the series and was written by executive producer Etan Frankel and directed by executive producer David Nutter. It originally aired on Showtime on November 6, 2016.

The series is set on the South Side of Chicago, Illinois, and depicts the poor, dysfunctional family of Frank Gallagher, a neglectful single father of six: Fiona, Phillip, Ian, Debbie, Carl, and Liam. He spends his days drunk, high, or in search of money, while his children need to learn to take care of themselves. In the episode, Fiona makes a big decision for her future, while Frank takes advantage of the money provided for the shelter. Meanwhile, Lip continues his operation with Joaquin, while Debbie announces a shocking decision.

According to Nielsen Media Research, the episode was seen by an estimated 1.44 million household viewers and gained a 0.5 ratings share among adults aged 18–49. The episode received generally positive reviews from critics, although some were unsatisfied with the episode's subplots.

== Plot ==
Fiona (Emmy Rossum) buys an A/C unit for her bedroom, and decides to pursue buying the laundromat from Etta (June Squibb). Fiona convinces her in buying the lease by asking for a $100,000 loan, and Etta will still be allowed to live in her apartment upstairs. However, Fiona is disappointed when the bank is only willing to lend $80,000.

Debbie (Emma Kenney) has moved in with Sierra's paralytic brother Neil (Zack Pearlman), whose brain injury has caused him to say the very first thing that comes up in his head. She invites her family to dine with them, except for Fiona. Carl (Ethan Cutkosky) has been accepted into military school, but is having second thoughts about joining after considering he might be a victim of hazing. Dominique (Jaylen Barron) also is interested in getting back with him, although Luther (Peter Macon) later shows Carl that she is once again cheating on him. While transporting a woman in the ambulance, Ian (Cameron Monaghan) is shaken when the woman dies despite his efforts.

As Frank (William H. Macy) gets the inhabitants at the shelter to act as beggars in the street, he has the church donate some furniture. Subsequently, he resells the furniture and keeps most of the money for himself. As he is counting the money, he is visited by Debbie, who asks for a favor; she wants to marry Neil and wants him to sign papers in allowing it as she is not an adult. Frank refuses, feeling that Debbie is condemned to a long life before finally getting Neil's cash as he is still relatively young. Debbie angrily leaves, although one of Frank's inhabitants overhears Frank explaining his money plans. Later, Frank returns to the shelter to bury the money, only to find that they have already discovered it. Angry at Frank's actions, they kick him out of the window and exile him from the house.

Lip (Jeremy Allen White) continues having sex with Sierra (Ruby Modine). However, she feels insulted when he is unsure over the status of their relationship. Sierra makes it clear that while she likes having sex with him, she is not interested in pursuing something big with him, and Lip agrees in keeping it the way it was. Lip also continues his operation with Joaquin (José Julián) at the company, until the DEA arrives to shut it down. When Fiona tells him about the loan, Lip is infuriated when he learns that she placed the house as a collateral until she pays the rest of the $20,000 loan. Kevin (Steve Howey) is disturbed when he discovers Yvon (Pasha Lychnikoff) having sex with a woman, believing it to be Svetlana (Isidora Goreshter). He and Veronica (Shanola Hampton) check again, and are horrified that it was actually Svetlana. When they confront Svetlana, she confirms the sexual relationship but also drops another surprise: Yvon is not her father, is her husband.

Ian and Trevor (Elliot Fletcher) want to pursue a sexual relationship, but discover that both of them are "tops", and they end up questioning how to proceed. Debbie asks Fiona to sign the papers, and is surprised when she actually agrees. That night, after being encouraged by his siblings, Carl finally leaves for military school. As they leave the bus station, Lip tells Fiona she can still reconsider the loan. Fiona simply stays silent, and Lip angrily leaves. At military school, a group of bullies tries to intimidate Carl. Carl easily beats the leader, and the rest of the group chooses to leave him alone.

== Production ==
=== Development ===
The episode was written by executive producer Etan Frankel and directed by David Nutter. It was Frankel's 12th writing credit, and Nutter's fourth directing credit.

== Reception ==
=== Viewers ===
In its original American broadcast, "The Defenestration of Frank" was seen by an estimated 1.44 million household viewers with a 0.5 in the 18–49 demographics. This means that 0.5 percent of all households with televisions watched the episode. This was a 20% increase in viewership from the previous episode, which was seen by an estimated 1.20 million household viewers with a 0.4 in the 18–49 demographics.

=== Critical reviews ===
"The Defenestration of Frank" received generally positive reviews from critics. Myles McNutt of The A.V. Club gave the episode a "B–" grade and wrote, "The show has been on much stronger thematic ground this season, but a byproduct of this is that I find myself wishing that the show was able to focus more on those themes, and not have to serve as many masters as it has chosen to. This particular hour ended up having a little too much going on to tap into what the season is doing best, but it's still there, and will hopefully become a proper focus as the season wears on."

Christina Ciammaichelli of Entertainment Weekly gave the episode a "B–" grade and wrote "Is this power struggle between Lip and Fiona tearing anyone else apart, or is it just me? They're so great as a team when they're on the same page, but from the looks of tonight's episode, they won't be seeing eye-to-eye anytime soon."

Dara Driscoll of TV Overmind wrote, "After last week's filler episode, I was hoping for something exciting this week. Nothing groundbreaking happened, but that sentimentality came through again this week. There were a few great scenes between the siblings exchanging stories that I loved." Paul Dailly of TV Fanatic gave the episode a 3.8 star rating out of 5, and wrote, ""The Defenestration of Frank" was a decent episode of this Showtime drama. All of the characters are making some big decisions about their lives and it's making for good TV."
