= Home Sweet Homeless Shelter =

- Shameless episode
- Episode no.: Season 7 Episode 3
- Directed by: Iain B. MacDonald
- Written by: Krista Vernoff
- Cinematography by: Loren Yaconelli
- Editing by: John M. Valerio
- Original release date: October 16, 2016
- Running time: 55 minutes

Guest appearances
- Alicia Coppola as Sue; Tate Ellington as Chad; Deirdre Lovejoy as Rita; Pasha Lychnikoff as Yvon; Peter Macon as Luther Winslow; Ruby Modine as Sierra; Arden Myrin as Dollface Dolores; Rebecca Metz as Melinda; Derek Anthony as Neighbor; Gary Ballard as Dr. Sachs; Jaylen Barron as Dominique Winslow; Joy Brunson as Kaylee; Irene Choi as Taryn; Michael Cognata as Tito; Jim Hoffmaster as Kermit; Karen Malina White as Sylvie Prum

Episode chronology
← Previous "Swipe, Fuck, Leave"	Next → "I Am a Storm"
- Shameless season 7

"Home Sweet Homeless Shelter" is the third episode of the seventh season of the American television comedy drama Shameless, an adaptation of the British series of the same name. It is the 75th overall episode of the series and was written by executive producer Krista Vernoff and directed by Iain B. MacDonald. It originally aired on Showtime on October 16, 2016.

The series is set on the South Side of Chicago, Illinois, and depicts the poor, dysfunctional family of Frank Gallagher, a neglectful single father of six: Fiona, Phillip, Ian, Debbie, Carl, and Liam. He spends his days drunk, high, or in search of money, while his children need to learn to take care of themselves. In the episode, Frank decides to have a new family and find them a new home, while Fiona decides to make a big leap for herself.

According to Nielsen Media Research, the episode was seen by an estimated 1.44 million household viewers and gained a 0.6 ratings share among adults aged 18–49. The episode received mostly positive reviews from critics, who praised Fiona's character development, humor and tone.

== Plot ==
Frank (William H. Macy) has moved in to a homeless shelter with his one-night stand, Dollface (Arden Myrin). When Frank notices similarities between her and Monica, he decides to dub her "New Monica." The officers of the shelter state that they will have to find a new shelter as it is soon to be closed. Frank, having disowned his family, takes Dollface and a few other homeless people to form his new "family."

Kevin (Steve Howey), Veronica (Shanola Hampton), and Svetlana (Isidora Goreshter) commence their topless maid service while dealing with the sudden arrival of Svetlana's intimidating father, Yvon (Pasha Lychnikoff). While they dislike him, they decide to hire to work at the Alibi while they run the business and take care of the babies. Carl (Ethan Cutkosky) is pursued by Luther (Peter Macon), as he accuses him of giving gonorrhea to Dominique (Jaylen Barron). When Carl asks her about it, she dismisses his concerns, prompting him to visit the doctor again for a new test. Lip (Jeremy Allen White) dislikes his activities at the internship, but is pressured by his boss to stay.

Frank tries to get his new family food at Patsy's, but Fiona (Emmy Rossum) forces him to leave. Frank then takes them to an open house, where he claims the owner of the house gave him permission to stay. When the realtor calls the police, Frank takes all the people from the shelter to live with them, citing that the realtor has no evidence against him. The police, while suspecting Frank of lying, allow him to stay, and Frank retrieves wasted food from dumpsters for the inhabitants. Ian (Cameron Monaghan), still shaken over his break-up, goes off the rails when he tries to help a schizophrenic woman into the ambulance. He breaks protocol by unrestraining her hands, allowing herself to be released and jump into a car, almost dying. Ian keeps his job, but his colleague Sue (Alicia Coppola) asks him to take a break. Debbie (Emma Kenney) is also caught stealing clothes, forcing Fiona to leave Patsy's to convince the owner not to press charges.

After his test results show he is negative, Carl follows Dominique, discovering that she is cheating on him with a college student. He shows the evidence to Luther, who gets a SWAT team to raid the house. Fiona is scolded by Chad (Tate Ellington), who tells her that Margo, his boss, will not tolerate her constant absences. Fiona agrees, but is also fascinated upon learning that Margo built so much after dropping out of high school. Inspired, she informs her siblings that they will be taking care of themselves when at home, including personal necessities, and also makes them put her at the bottom of the emergency contact. Veronica arrives, showing them that Frank has opened a shelter, the Gallagher Home for the Homeless, where nuns provide food for the homeless. Liam abandons his family and goes with Frank, referring to Dollface as his mother.

== Production ==
The episode was written by executive producer Krista Vernoff and directed by Iain B. MacDonald. It was Vernoff's sixth writing credit, and MacDonald's third directing credit.

== Reception ==
=== Viewers ===
In its original American broadcast, "Home Sweet Homeless Shelter" was seen by an estimated 1.44 million household viewers with a 0.6 in the 18–49 demographics. This means that 0.6 percent of all households with televisions watched the episode. This was a 29% increase in viewership from the previous episode, which was seen by an estimated 1.11 million household viewers with a 0.4 in the 18–49 demographics.

=== Critical reviews ===
"Home Sweet Homeless Shelter" received mostly positive reviews from critics. Myles McNutt of The A.V. Club gave the episode a "B" grade and wrote, "Perspective was gained in this hour of television, for both the characters and the audience, and that makes it a successful transition episode into the next act of the season."

Christina Ciammaichelli of Entertainment Weekly gave the episode a "B" grade and wrote "The whole scene between Kevin and the neighbor was so perfect, I wish I could put the transcript here but it wouldn't do it justice – you just have to watch Steve Howey."

Dara Driscoll of TV Overmind wrote, "I'm excited for the future of Fiona this season. I hope she doesn't end up in another relationship, and actually pursues the life she wants. Will this show ever let me down? Probably not! Until next week's Shameless shenanigans." Paul Dailly of TV Fanatic gave the episode a perfect 5 star rating out of 5, and wrote, ""Home Sweet Homeless Shelter" was up there as one of the best episodes of the entire series. The show can flawlessly switch between serious subjects and humor. No other show on TV is quite like it."
