= Shameless season 7 =

Shameless
- Season 7
- DVD cover
- Showrunner: John Wells
- Starring: William H. Macy; Emmy Rossum; Jeremy Allen White; Ethan Cutkosky; Shanola Hampton; Steve Howey; Emma Kenney; Cameron Monaghan; Isidora Goreshter
- No. of episodes: 12

Release
- Original network: Showtime
- Original release: October 2 – December 18, 2016

Season chronology
- ← Previous; Season 6 Next → Season 8

The seventh season of Shameless, based on the British series of the same name by Paul Abbott, is an American comedy-drama television series with executive producers John Wells, Christopher Chulack, Krista Vernoff, Etan Frankel, Nancy M. Pimental and Sheila Callaghan. The season premiered on October 2, 2016, the first time the series has debuted in autumn. Showtime premiered a free preview of the season premiere online on September 23, 2016, ahead of the October 2 broadcast.

== Plot ==
One month after Fiona's failed wedding, Frank wakes up from a coma and is disowned by his family. Fiona is finally trying to take control of her life, having become the manager of Patsy's Pies. She revamps the diner in order to increase its audience. When a local laundromat building goes up for sale, Fiona buys the laundromat after speaking with the senile owner, Etta, who has Dementia. With the help of Frank and Kevin, Fiona revamps the laundromat and, forgiving her father, lets Frank stay with Etta in her apartment. Though business at the revamped laundromat initially goes well, Fiona sells the building for a major profit and subsequently sends Etta to live at a nursing home.

Lip, still struggling with alcoholism, begins a relationship with Sierra, a single mother whom Fiona hires as a waitress at Patsy's. Raising her young son alone, Sierra has left her ex-boyfriend, Charlie, due to his drug addiction. Debbie, after beating up a homeless lady is video taped by her baby daddy’s sister and gets reported to CPS. In order to keep Franny, Debbie must prove she provide Franny with a home life. She cons and gets engaged to Sierra's disabled brother Neil, though both Sierra and Lip are disapproving of the relationship. Following his college expulsion, Lip attends an appeal at his college that Professor Youens had orchestrated. However, the committee refuses to expunge Lip's disciplinary record and refuses to let him re-enroll. This culminates in Lip relapsing back to alcohol, and when he drunkenly attacks Charlie, Sierra breaks up with him, not wanting her son to deal with two addicts. Meanwhile, Kevin and Veronica are forced to find new jobs after Svetlana manipulates them into giving her full ownership of the Alibi. Feeling betrayed, Kevin and Veronica cut off their romantic relationship with Svetlana. Carl receives a scholarship for military school and decides to attend; the school changes his personality for the better.

When Frank briefly begins a short-lived homeless shelter in the neighborhood, Ian meets Trevor, a male transgender activist wanting to volunteer at the shelter. Ian and Trevor begin dating, but their relationship is tested when Ian is informed by an officer that Mickey has recently broken out of prison. Unbeknownst to Trevor, Ian reconnects with Mickey, who is on the run with another inmate; Mickey implores Ian to flee with him across the Mexican border, which forces Ian to make a hard decision. Though he initially accompanies Mickey to the border, he experiences second thoughts before crossing and refuses to proceed with Mickey's plan. Heartbroken, Mickey shares a final kiss with Ian before successfully crossing the border wearing a disguise. Ian later apologizes to Trevor for cheating on him.

The second half of the season revolves around the reappearance of a frail Monica, who has returned to make amends with her family—however, her kids are all generally dismissive of her. Monica reconciles with Frank and reveals that she is dying with irreparable brain damage; the two resort back to their old habits. Frank and Monica eventually decide to renew their vows, and the following morning, Monica passes away in her sleep from a brain aneurysm. Indifferent to her mother's death, Fiona meets with her grandfather to prepare a small funeral, while Frank gives each family member a portion of Monica's inheritance: 7 pounds of crystal meth. Fiona buries her portion of the meth in Monica's coffin. The Gallagher family and friends host a small party following Monica's funeral: Frank is accepted by his family once again, and he shares a dance with Fiona; Lip and Sierra have a good time at the party—they remain separated, but stay on good terms.

The seventh season closes with a montage of the Gallaghers continuing on with their lives, some with new beginnings: Debbie has begun taking welding classes; Lip gets a new AA sponsor, Brad; Carl has returned from military school as a changed man; Fiona becomes the owner of a local apartment building and Frank and Carl make a graffiti in honor of their mother in an alley.

== Cast ==
=== Main ===
- William H. Macy as Frank Gallagher
- Emmy Rossum as Fiona Gallagher
- Jeremy Allen White as Philip "Lip" Gallagher
- Ethan Cutkosky as Carl Gallagher
- Shanola Hampton as Veronica “V” Fisher
- Steve Howey as Kevin "Kev" Ball
- Emma Kenney as Debbie Gallagher
- Cameron Monaghan as Ian Gallagher
- Isidora Goreshter as Svetlana Yevgenivna Fisher

=== Special guest stars ===
- June Squibb as Etta Teasdale
- Chloe Webb as Monica Gallagher
- Noel Fisher as Mickey Milkovich
- Sasha Alexander as Helene Runyon

=== Recurring ===
- Brendan and Brandon Sims as Liam Gallagher
- Michael Patrick McGill as Tommy
- Jim Hoffmaster as Kermit
- Rebecca Metz as Melinda
- Gabrielle Walsh as Tanya Delgado
- Alan Rosenberg as Professor Youens
- Jaylen Barron as Dominique Winslow
- Peter Macon as Sergeant Winslow
- Alicia Coppola as Sue
- Tate Ellington as Chad
- Gary Ballard as Dr. Sachs
- Sharon Lawrence as Margo Mierzejewski
- Paul Culos as Joe
- Nick Jaine as Gene
- Arden Myrin as New Monica/Dollface Dolores
- Ruby Modine as Sierra Morton
- Andrea Ellsworth as Didi
- Suteara Vaughn as Ariel
- Pasha Lychnikoff as Yvon
- Shannon Brown as New Debbie
- Cooper J. Friedman as Lucas Morton
- Mary E. Kennedy as New Fiona
- Jonah Hwang as New Lip
- Harley Cunningham as New Ian
- Elliot Fletcher as Trevor
- Zack Pearlman as Neil Morton

=== Guests ===
- Teresa Ornelas as Ellie
- Jenica Bergere as Lisa
- José Julián as Joaquin
- Stacie Greenwell as Olga
- Jeff Pierre as Caleb Daniels
- Michael Cognata as Tito
- Josh McCrary as New Carl
- Chet Hanks as Charlie
- Laura Cerón as Celia Delgado
- Scott Michael Campbell as Brad
- Barry Sloane as Ryan
- Deirdre Lovejoy as Rita
- Jennifer Taylor as Anne Seery
- Oscar Nunez as Rick Encarnacion
- John Aylward as Grandpa Bill

== Episodes ==
No. overall	No. in season	Title	Directed by	Written by	Original release date	US viewers (millions)
73	1	"Hiraeth"	Christopher Chulack	John Wells	September 23, 2016 (online); October 2, 2016 (Showtime)	1.24
One month later, Frank awakens from his coma after being found in Lake Michigan. He returns home to surprised family and friends, who believed he was dead. Initially upset that no one was looking for him, Frank eventually recalls what had happened. When the family refuses to let him stay in the house, Frank locks himself in Fiona's room. After Sean's abrupt departure, Fiona has become the manager at Patsy's. Kevin, Veronica, and Svetlana continue their polygamous relationship as all three help each other out with their own necessities and running the Alibi together. Lip is released from AA treatment and reveals to Fiona that he needs a job. Debbie has difficulty as a single mother; she resorts to stealing other people's belongings and hires a night nanny, Jolayemi. Carl decides to get circumcised to improve his sex life with Dominique. Ian starts to have doubts about his relationship with Caleb. With the help of Lip, Ian follows Caleb and discovers him making out with another woman.
74	2	"Swipe, Fuck, Leave"	Rob Hardy	Nancy M. Pimental	October 9, 2016	1.11
Fiona informs Chad, the owner of Patsy's, of her desire to resign from her job. However, she is informed about the diner's financial state and is instead recommended to hire her own staff. Fiona fires the current waitresses and hires new employees, one of which introduces her to dating via social media. Lip flirts with Sierra, one of the new waitresses. Kevin hires a topless maid service who he believes will clean his house. When he discovers that the "maids" are actually prostitutes, Kevin starts his own topless maid service with Svetlana and Veronica. Ian and Caleb decide to break up. Lip starts a new job as an intern while continuing to deal with his alcohol problems. Debbie starts a toddler merchandise scam. Carl struggles with erectile dysfunction following his circumcision. Frank gets revenge on his family by hiring workers to construct walls around the Gallagher house, leaving the family with no place to sleep; he flees when the Gallaghers demolish the walls.
75	3	"Home Sweet Homeless Shelter"	Iain B. MacDonald	Krista Vernoff	October 16, 2016	1.44
Kevin, Veronica, and Svetlana commence their topless maid service while dealing with the sudden arrival of Svetlana's intimidating father, Yvon. Frank moves into a shelter and officially fulfills his quest by "disowning" his family and forming a new family consisting of homeless people. Ian's break-up with Caleb puts him in a manic state. Lip finds himself on a rocky start to his new job, and he has sex with Sierra. Carl is confronted by Dominique's father, who claims that he gave her gonorrhea. Carl gets himself tested to prove he isn't, and he later finds Dominique at a fraternity house making out with an older man. Debbie has a brush with the law when she is caught shoplifting, and she finds herself in debt to Jolayemi. Fiona grows inspired by Chad's boss, Margo, a high school dropout worth $300 million. Realizing she wants to take back her life, Fiona informs her siblings that they will be taking care of themselves when at home, including personal necessities. Veronica shows the family that Frank has begun a homeless shelter in an empty house on the block.
76	4	"I Am a Storm"	Emmy Rossum	Sheila Callaghan	October 23, 2016	1.38
The neighborhood wants to shut down Frank's homeless shelter. Worrying that his new family will lose their home, Frank calls a local news station and stages a public protest on television. Fiona drums up business by throwing a speakeasy party at Patsy's, and decides to keep the restaurant open 24/7. Fiona and Lip get into a fight over her job at Patsy's; Lip believes that Fiona's manager position will not help the family in the long run. Veronica disapproves of Fiona's behavior, causing a drift in their relationship. Lip learns his new job is pursuing illegal business practices. Debbie attempts to get a job at the Alibi, and is instead given "advice" from Svetlana, who encourages Debbie to find a new love interest and advertise herself. Ian meets a new love interest named Trevor, who he then finds out is transgender. Kevin, Veronica, and Svetlana fight over whether it is safe to leave their children with Yvon. Carl spends time with Dominque's father, who advises Carl to enter military school if he wants to pursue a career in law enforcement.
77	5	"Own Your Shit"	Christopher Chulack	Dominique Morisseau	October 30, 2016	1.20
Through her new-found independence and lack of appreciation from higher management of Patsy's, Fiona contemplates buying a local laundromat building near Patsy's. Ian confronts Fiona over her new independence and how she's treating the family; Fiona states that she's "not gonna apologize for getting my life together." Ian becomes confused when he and Trevor kiss; Ian admits to Kevin that he finds Trevor attractive, but is unsure if he wants to start a relationship. Following Frank's protest, a billionaire purchases the house and declares it public housing. Debbie gets the attention of Child Services when she is caught, on video, fighting with a woman while carrying Franny. The business model of Lip's new job inspires him to create his own profit. Kevin, Veronica, and Svetlana contemplate on adopting each of their children. Carl is rejected from military school, as the remaining spots are being reserved for people of color. After researching his heritage, Carl reapplies to the school upon finding out he is part Native American.
78	6	"The Defenestration of Frank"	David Nutter	Etan Frankel	November 6, 2016	1.44
Fiona decides to fully invest in the local laundromat and talks with the senile owner, Etta. Lip gambles with his wire-fraud scheme and questions the state of his fling with Sierra, wanting to ensure that their relationship is merely casual. At the homeless shelter, Frank begins pocketing money for himself. When his new family finds out, they angrily throw Frank out the window. Ian and Trevor want to pursue a sexual relationship, but discover that both of them are "tops." In order to provide Franny with a home life, Debbie moves in with Sierra's handicapped brother, Neil, and pursues a relationship with him. Though Sierra and Lip disapprove of the relationship, Debbie announces her plans to marry Neil. Kevin and Veronica discover that Yvon is actually Svetlana's husband. Carl breaks up with Dominique and receives a scholarship for military school. Though he is initially hesitant, Carl decides to attend the school after some encouragement from family members.
79	7	"You'll Never Ever Get a Chicken in Your Whole Entire Life"	John Wells	Nancy M. Pimental	November 13, 2016	1.33
Expecting a visit from DCFS, Debbie creates a list of things to do for the day, including marrying Neil, attending a parenting class, and quitting high school. Following the home inspection, Debbie and Neil engage in a rendezvous. Sierra leaves her son, Lucas, to spend the day with his father Charlie; Lip helps Sierra find Lucas when Charlie abandons him. Lip receives news from Youens, who informs him that the local university granted his request to appeal his case. Ian and Trevor begin a sexual relationship. Fiona initially has second thoughts over her investment into the local laundromat; the laundromat is in bad shape, and Etta is displaying signs of dementia. Despite Margo's disapproval, Fiona ultimately works towards revitalizing the laundromat. Liam turns to Frank when his school is suddenly shut down, and Frank enrolls Liam in a new private school for free. Kevin and Veronica reveal to Svetlana that they want to get rid of Yvon. They are shocked when Svetlana, in blood-splattered clothes, arrives and proclaims that Yvon is officially gone from their lives.
80	8	"You Sold Me the Laundromat, Remember?"	Allison Liddi-Brown	Krista Vernoff	November 20, 2016	1.40
Kevin becomes distraught over placing trust in Svetlana due to her questionable actions, such as making fake passports, stealing the van and letting people rent out the Alibi's apartment. Out of money, Fiona decides to revamp the laundromat herself, with the help of Frank and Kevin. Fiona gives Kevin advice over his issues with Svetlana, and also lets Frank move into the laundromat with Etta. Ian officially gets together with Trevor. Lip attends his appeal hearing at the university, where Ian and Professor Youens make heartfelt appeals to the school board. The board believes Lip has a bright future, but they ultimately reject his plea over his case. Lip gets drunk and gets into an altercation with Charlie; Sierra breaks up with Lip, stating that she doesn't want Lucas to deal with another addict. Debbie believes Derek's family were the individuals who called DCFS, and she attempts to get into good graces with the family. Later, Debbie leaves Franny with Neil; Derek's family then kidnap Franny.
81	9	"Ouroboros"	Christopher Chulack	Sheila Callaghan	November 27, 2016	1.56
Monica makes a return and proclaims she has changed, leaving the family skeptical once again. Monica helps Debbie get Franny back from Derek's family, leading a grateful Debbie to let her mother stay in Neil's apartment. The re-opening of the local laundromat commences; Fiona is distraught when a negative review of the new laundromat appears online. Lip's alcoholism returns and sets him off on a new downward spiral, as he is a no-show for a job interview set up by Professor Youens. Frank continues to keep Etta company. Kevin, Veronica, and Svetlana go to couples' therapy; Kevin and Veronica learn that Svetlana has changed the Alibi's business format and somehow now owns a part of the bar. Monica reveals to Frank that she has brain damage and is dying. Ian and Trevor engage in an argument over Trevor's ID after attempting to enter a bar. The Gallaghers are greeted by a detective, who informs Ian that Mickey has escaped from prison.
82	10	"Ride or Die"	Zetna Fuentes	Dominique Morisseau	December 4, 2016	1.60
Upon Mickey's escape, Ian is conflicted over his feelings towards Trevor in their relationship. Fiona is offered $160,000 from Margo to buy the local laundromat from her; Fiona contemplates the offer, as she had promised Etta that she can stay in the laundromat. Veronica is left heartbroken by Svetlana's betrayal; Kevin attempts again to fix the threes' relationship, and finds out that Svetlana had forged the ownership papers as adoption papers. Kevin is persuaded by Fiona to consult a lawyer on getting the bar back. Fiona and Veronica reconcile. Lip continues his downward spiral and finds himself breaking into Helene's house; Helene begs Lip to seek help, and Lip breaks down. In an attempt to make more money, Frank and Monica rob a bus of senior citizens. Ian gets kidnapped by a group of men who take him to a football field; Mickey, sporting a new look, arrives and reunites with Ian. Mickey implores Ian to escape with him to Mexico, and Ian agrees to accompany Mickey.
83	11	"Happily Ever After"	John M. Valerio	Etan Frankel	December 11, 2016	1.58
While driving to the Mexican border, Ian and Mickey discuss their feelings, and Mickey asks Ian why he never visited him in prison. Upon arriving at the border, Ian changes his mind and proclaims he is a changed man. He says goodbye to Mickey, leaving him a substantial amount of money from his savings account. Mickey accepts Ian's decision and they share a kiss, before Mickey successfully crosses the border with a disguise. Fiona officially sells the laundromat and finds herself with another business opportunity when Chad introduces her to a real estate agent. As a result of the laundromat's closure, Fiona reluctantly sends Etta to an assisted living facility. Lip attempts to get his sobriety under control and befriends fellow AA member Brad. Now without the Alibi, Kevin and Veronica search for new jobs, and Kevin finds a job at a gay bar. Frank and Monica attempt to renew their vows. The following morning, Frank discovers that Monica has passed away in her sleep.
84	12	"Requiem for a Slut"	John Wells	John Wells	December 18, 2016	1.72
The Gallaghers arrange a funeral for Monica while expressing their indifference towards her. Fiona contacts her estranged grandfather, who pays for the funeral. Frank finds out Monica had left an inheritance of $70,000 in the form of methamphetamine, and he gives each family member a portion of the meth. Upon learning of Monica's death, Carl returns from military school and reunites with his siblings. Ian confesses his encounter with Mickey to Trevor, and they both question the future of their relationship. Fiona and Frank get into an intense argument about Monica, during which Fiona denounces Monica for abandoning the family. At Monica's funeral, Fiona buries her share of the meth in Monica's coffin. The Gallaghers throw a party after the funeral; Fiona forgives Frank by sharing a dance with him, while Lip rekindles his friendship with Sierra. The season finale ends with a montage of the Gallaghers resuming their lives, some venturing into new scenarios and beginnings: Debbie begins attending welding classes; Ian resumes his paramedic job; Lip continues to attend AA meetings with Brad; Fiona becomes the new owner of a local apartment building; Frank and Carl make a graffiti in honor of Monica in an alley.

== Production ==
Recurring actress Isidora Goreshter has been promoted to series regular with the commencement of the season. Star Emmy Rossum made her directorial debut with the fourth episode, "I Am a Storm".
