= Own Your Shit =

- Shameless episode
- Episode no.: Season 7 Episode 5
- Directed by: Christopher Chulack
- Written by: Dominique Morisseau
- Cinematography by: Loren Yaconelli
- Editing by: Omar Hassan-Reep
- Original release date: October 30, 2016
- Running time: 53 minutes

Guest appearances
- June Squibb as Etta (special guest star); Sharon Lawrence as Margo Mierzejewski; Ser'Darius Blain as Chuku; Alicia Coppola as Sue; Tate Ellington as Chad; Elliot Fletcher as Trevor; José Julián as Joaquin; Pasha Lychnikoff as Yvon; Peter Macon as Luther Winslow; Ruby Modine as Sierra; Arden Myrin as Dollface Dolores; Zack Pearlman as Neil; Joel Steingold as Marcus; Khleo Thomas as Dylan Thomas; Raquel Bell as Abby; Andrea Grano as Elena Torres; Jim Hoffmaster as Kermit; Michael Patrick McGill as Tommy; Jennifer Shelton as Beverly; Gabrielle Walsh as Tanya Delgado

Episode chronology
← Previous "I Am a Storm"	Next → "The Defenestration of Frank"
- Shameless season 7

"Own Your Shit" is the fifth episode of the seventh season of the American television comedy drama Shameless, an adaptation of the British series of the same name. It is the 77th overall episode of the series and was written by Dominique Morisseau and directed by executive producer Christopher Chulack. It originally aired on Showtime on October 30, 2016.

The series is set on the South Side of Chicago, Illinois, and depicts the poor, dysfunctional family of Frank Gallagher, a neglectful single father of six: Fiona, Phillip, Ian, Debbie, Carl, and Liam. He spends his days drunk, high, or in search of money, while his children need to learn to take care of themselves. In the episode, Fiona asks for a raise, while Frank receives financial aid from a billionaire. Meanwhile, Lip sees a business opportunity, while Debbie struggles in paying Fiona her share of the money.

According to Nielsen Media Research, the episode was seen by an estimated 1.20 million household viewers and gained a 0.4 ratings share among adults aged 18–49. The episode received positive reviews from critics, who praised the performances consequences for the characters.

== Plot ==
Fiona (Emmy Rossum) has a one-night stand with a man through Tinder. The man is a financial consultant and suggests she could earn more money through other ventures than just Patsy's. As she considers the offer, she visits the local laundromat, where the owner Etta (June Squibb) is planning to sell the establishment due to her age.

Frank (William H. Macy) is visited by a city worker, who reveals that a billionaire, Simon Epstein, saw his TV appearance. Moved, he decides to buy the house and make it a public housing, providing Frank and the inhabitants with power and water. To renovate the house, Frank sends some of the inhabitants to ask for money in the streets, keeping half of it for his financial benefit. Carl (Ethan Cutkosky) applies for military school; despite getting a recommendation from Luther (Peter Macon), he is turned down as the applications were all filed out and there is only a few spots reserved for people of color. Carl wants Luther to vouch for him that he is part African-American, but Luther instead gets him a DNA test.

Debbie (Emma Kenney) tries desperately in finding the $300 she owes to Fiona or facing a possible eviction. Advised by Frank, she decides to ask for money in the street, although she does not earn much. She also gets into a fight with a homeless woman who complains that Debbie is taking her spot, all while carrying Franny. Lip (Jeremy Allen White) continues working at the company, which is now moving to different offices. Seeing the lists of names involved, Lip contacts Joaquin (José Julián) in hacking the servers and possibly making money. Kevin (Steve Howey) and Veronica (Shanola Hampton) are informed by Svetlana (Isidora Goreshter) that they could get a tax break if they all formally adopt their babies. They apply, but are also forced to vaccinate their children to participate.

Ian (Cameron Monaghan) kisses Trevor (Elliot Fletcher), but he is left confused about it. He confides in Kevin that he is unsure if he wants to continue with Trevor. He also talks with Fiona, questioning her new behavior and sideling her family. Fiona simply says she will not "apologize for getting my life together." Content with how Patsy's increased in business, Fiona visits Chad (Tate Ellington) to ask for a raise. Later, Margo (Sharon Lawrence) grants her a raise, but only half of what she asked. At home, the Gallaghers are visited by a Child Services officer; Debbie's fight was recorded on video, and they have opened an investigation to determine if she is fit to raise Franny.

== Production ==
=== Development ===
The episode was written by Dominique Morisseau and directed by executive producer Christopher Chulack. It was Morisseau's second writing credit, and Chulack's ninth directing credit.

== Reception ==
=== Viewers ===
In its original American broadcast, "Own Your Shit" was seen by an estimated 1.20 million household viewers with a 0.4 in the 18–49 demographics. This means that 0.4 percent of all households with televisions watched the episode. This was a 14% decrease in viewership from the previous episode, which was seen by an estimated 1.38 million household viewers with a 0.5 in the 18–49 demographics.

=== Critical reviews ===
"Own Your Shit" received positive reviews from critics. Myles McNutt of The A.V. Club gave the episode a "B" grade and wrote, ""Own Your Shit" is about characters searching for stability, but the episode itself largely serves to assert the stability of its various storylines. Everyone ends the episode feeling largely settled in a particular path: while Debbie's family services problem is treated as a cliffhanger, the episode provides a clear sense of where her story is headed, and we now pretty much have the same for every character involved. The result is not a particularly thrilling or game-changing episode, but the show continues to move purposefully, and has achieved a sense of clarity of storytelling that has been absent the past few seasons."

Christina Ciammaichelli of Entertainment Weekly gave the episode a "B" grade and wrote "So far, season 7 has taken everything we thought we knew about the Gallaghers and turned it on its head. [...] Could the neighborhood gentrification they've been fighting the past few seasons finally be helping them in some way?"

Dara Driscoll of TV Overmind wrote, "I'm happy about this development. Someone needs to step in to help this girl out. It's been hard to watch Debbie this season. Again, another solid episode from Shameless. It was a filler, but it wasn't boring to watch." Paul Dailly of TV Fanatic gave the episode a 4.5 star rating out of 5, and wrote, ""Own Your Sh*t" was another solid episode of this Showtime drama. The drama continues to be one of the best on television, and I can't wait to see what the rest of the season has in store for us."
