= I Am a Storm =

- Shameless episode
- Episode no.: Season 7 Episode 4
- Directed by: Emmy Rossum
- Written by: Sheila Callaghan
- Cinematography by: Loren Yaconelli
- Editing by: Toby Yates
- Original release date: October 23, 2016
- Running time: 55 minutes

Guest appearances
- Jenica Bergere as Lisa; Alicia Coppola as Sue; Elliot Fletcher as Trevor; Pasha Lychnikoff as Yvon; Peter Macon as Luther Winslow; Ruby Modine as Sierra; Alan Rosenberg as Professor Youens; Khleo Thomas as Dylan Thomas; Rebecca Metz as Melinda; Jaylen Barron as Dominique Winslow; Kahyun Kim as Melody; Shelley Robertson as Officer Dawson

Episode chronology
← Previous "Home Sweet Homeless Shelter"	Next → "Own Your Shit"
- Shameless season 7

"I Am a Storm" is the fourth episode of the seventh season of the American television comedy drama Shameless, an adaptation of the British series of the same name. It is the 76th overall episode of the series and was written by executive producer Sheila Callaghan and directed by main cast member Emmy Rossum. It originally aired on Showtime on October 23, 2016.

The series is set on the South Side of Chicago, Illinois, and depicts the poor, dysfunctional family of Frank Gallagher, a neglectful single father of six: Fiona, Phillip, Ian, Debbie, Carl, and Liam. He spends his days drunk, high, or in search of money, while his children need to learn to take care of themselves. In the episode, Fiona tries to save Patsy's by establishing new rules, while Frank tries to prevent the neighborhood from shutting down the homeless shelter. Meanwhile, Lip discovers the purpose of the company, while Ian finds a new love interest.

According to Nielsen Media Research, the episode was seen by an estimated 1.38 million household viewers and gained a 0.5 ratings share among adults aged 18–49. The episode received critical acclaim, with Emmy Rossum receiving praise for her directing and acting.

== Plot ==
To increase profitability at Patsy's, Fiona (Emmy Rossum) decides to get the diner open 24/7. However, there is very little interest in customers visiting during the early morning hours. Fiona follows some girls, and discovers that a competing restaurant is offering alcohol. Fiona then gets Patsy's to secretly offer alcohol in the menus.

Frank (William H. Macy) continues heading the homeless shelter, although his neighbors dislike the people's presence in their houses. He attends a meeting to dissuade their fears, but the community votes to have the shelter demolished. Refusing to move out, he gets a local news reporter to make a statement and chaining himself to the house. Debbie (Emma Kenney) fails to pay her costs at the house, and Fiona forces her to apply for a job at a donut shop. Debbie does not get the job, and is frustrated that Fiona does not want to help her with the baby. She asks Kevin (Steve Howey) for a job at the Alibi Room, but he refuses as she is not an adult. Svetlana (Isidora Goreshter), however, suggests that Debbie should offer her services to a man so she can have a home, and she puts flyers across the city to find a man.

Lip (Jeremy Allen White) is promoted to senior intern at the tech company after his boss gets a new job, although he is still not getting paid. He mentors a new intern, who is confused over the company's activities as online gambling is not fully legal. That night, after everyone leaves, Lip sneaks into the server room and discovers that the company is using proxy servers to reroute IP addresses to places where the online gambling is illegal. The company hides this information everytime the FBI constantly checks on them. He confides this on Fiona, and when Fiona complains about her "paid" job, Lip tells her he can make far more money to finally help their family. An angered Fiona packs her stuff and moves out to Patsy's, deciding she is done in taking care of anyone but herself.

Carl (Ethan Cutkosky) starts hanging out with Luther (Peter Macon), angering Dominique (Jaylen Barron). Luther takes him to a shooting range, where Carl expresses interest in joining a SWAT team. While Luther cannot promise him a place, he suggests Carl could join military school to properly work within the law, telling him he also used to be a delinquent in his youth. Ian (Cameron Monaghan) meets an employee named Trevor (Elliot Fletcher) and takes a liking to him. However, he is surprised when Trevor reveals that he is a transgender man. To aliviate his concerns, Trevor takes him to meet some of his friends, although Ian is still confused. Kevin and Veronica (Shanola Hampton) are worried that Yvon (Pasha Lychnikoff) spends so much time with their children, and grow alarmed when he later takes them without permission. They call the police, although Yvon is revealed to simply have made a family portrait to thank them for letting him stay.

Lip is confronted by his new boss, Dylan (Khleo Thomas) for checking the servers. He offers him some iPads by signing a non-disclosure agreement, but the FBI suddenly arrives for a check-up. Lip takes the iPads and sneaks out. He confronts Youens (Alan Rosenberg) over giving him that company, but Youens explains that Lip can use his abilities to scam the people who scam other people. He takes the iPads to Fiona, using them to provide online service for Patsy's and mending their relationship. With Patsy's providing alcohol, Fiona is delighted to realize that they made $1,500 for the night.

== Production ==
=== Development ===
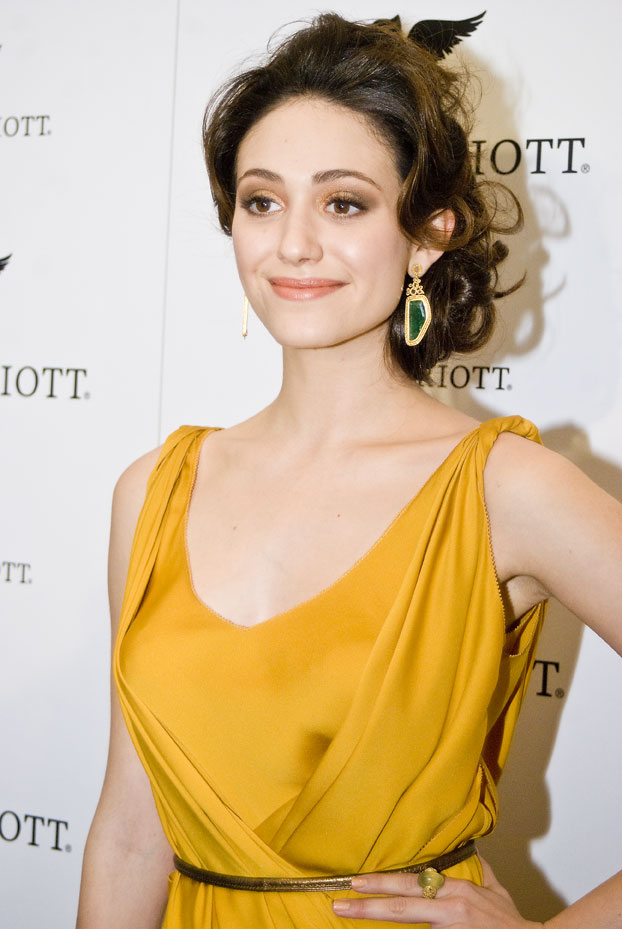
Main cast member Emmy Rossum made her directorial debut in the episode.

The episode was written by executive producer Sheila Callaghan and directed by main cast member Emmy Rossum. It was Callaghan's ninth writing credit, and Rossum's first directing credit. Rossum was confirmed to make her directorial debut in July 2016.

=== Filming ===
To prepare for her directorial debut, Rossum took a cinematography class at New York University. She said, "I felt like if I prepared my ass off and studied and took a cinematography course and did all the things that a Type A person would do and trusted my instincts, it might not be bad." Rossum said that she considered directing for years, before finally getting approval from series developer John Wells.

== Reception ==
=== Viewers ===
In its original American broadcast, "I Am a Storm" was seen by an estimated 1.38 million household viewers with a 0.5 in the 18–49 demographics. This means that 0.5 percent of all households with televisions watched the episode. This was a slight decrease in viewership from the previous episode, which was seen by an estimated 1.44 million household viewers with a 0.6 in the 18–49 demographics.

=== Critical reviews ===
"I Am a Storm" received critical acclaim. Myles McNutt of The A.V. Club gave the episode an "A–" grade and wrote, "This is the strongest episode of the season to date because it ends up feeling like a thesis statement on what it means to be a Gallagher, which is the unifying principle of this show and what it stands for. Not every story is working, but the ability to capture a throughline is something that has seemed absent the past few seasons."

Christina Ciammaichelli of Entertainment Weekly gave the episode a "B+" grade and wrote "The “new Fiona” is here, which means no more Mrs. Nice Girl. While we've seen Fiona try to change herself and her circumstances many times before, will this be the time it really sticks? And is it just me, or is she being a little harsh with Debbie? Plus, the episode's events take place on “the hottest day of the year” and just about everyone's a little more pissed off than usual."

Dara Driscoll of TV Overmind wrote, "In the end, Fiona is the storm. She looks stoic outside of her new twenty-four hour Patsy's, with most of her family inside. Another solid episode for this amazing show." Paul Dailly of TV Fanatic gave the episode a 4.5 star rating out of 5, and wrote, ""I Am a Storm" was another solid episode of this Showtime drama. The storylines continue to be fresh and exciting and I can't wait to see where we go next."
