= Paradise Lost (Shameless) =

- Shameless episode
- Episode no.: Season 6 Episode 10
- Directed by: Lynn Shelton
- Written by: Etan Frankel
- Cinematography by: Kevin McKnight
- Editing by: Rob Bramwell
- Original release date: March 20, 2016
- Running time: 49 minutes

Guest appearances
- Dermot Mulroney as Sean Pierce (special guest star); Sherilyn Fenn as Queenie Slott (special guest star); Anne Gee Byrd as Fern; Kyle Davis as Damon; Isidora Goreshter as Svetlana Milkovich; Jeff Kober as Jupiter; Peter Macon as Luther Winslow; Jeff Pierre as Caleb; Annie Sertich as Sorority Matron; Alan Rosenberg as Professor Youens; Jayne Taini as Harmony; Jaylen Barron as Dominique Winslow; Jim Hoffmaster as Kermit; Tina Huang as Yvonne; Wilke Itzin as Kirk; Christian Lyon as Wade; Michael Patrick McGill as Tommy; Rebecca Metz as Melinda; Craig Tate as Cortez

Episode chronology
← Previous "A Yurt of One's Own"	Next → "Sleep No More"
- Shameless season 6

"Paradise Lost" is the tenth episode of the sixth season of the American television comedy drama Shameless, an adaptation of the British series of the same name. It is the 70th overall episode of the series and was written by executive producer Etan Frankel and directed by Lynn Shelton. It originally aired on Showtime on March 20, 2016.

The series is set on the South Side of Chicago, Illinois, and depicts the poor, dysfunctional family of Frank Gallagher, a neglectful single father of six: Fiona, Phillip, Ian, Debbie, Carl, and Liam. He spends his days drunk, high, or in search of money, while his children need to learn to take care of themselves. In the episode, Frank and Debbie leave the commune after the latter begins laboring, while Lip's downward spiral continues.

According to Nielsen Media Research, the episode was seen by an estimated 1.60 million household viewers and gained a 0.6 ratings share among adults aged 18–49. The episode received highly positive reviews from critics, who praised the performances, writing and closure to Debbie's pregnancy arc.

== Plot ==
At the commune, Frank (William H. Macy) fights the leader, Jupiter (Jeff Kober), in a match on a black liquid. Frank wins the fight, earning him the right to have sex with any woman in the commune. While Frank enjoys his stay, Debbie (Emma Kenney) starts having second thoughts after discovering the laboring methods the commune intends to use on her.

Sean (Dermot Mulroney) has moved in with the Gallaghers, while Fiona (Emmy Rossum) begins planning her wedding. Veronica (Shanola Hampton) and Svetlana (Isidora Goreshter) continue their plans to get married, upsetting Kevin (Steve Howey). He tries to get them a fake ID, but is disappointed when he realizes they married behind his back. Ian (Cameron Monaghan) starts his EMT test, and manages to pass it after impressing the officers. Nevertheless, he lies about his mental health, as he and Caleb (Jeff Pierre) fear he might get passed on.

Lip (Jeremy Allen White) is assigned by Youens (Alan Rosenberg) to grade midterm papers. He also has his interview at an internship; despite arriving unprepared, the interview ends well for him. Later, he is fired from the sorority house after his reckless behavior at the party. Furthermore, he is told by the student council that he will have to attend counseling or face expulsion. Lip also confronts Youens after finding that his contributions to an article were credited to Youens, and insults him after revealing he did not grade the papers. Carl (Ethan Cutkosky) and Dominique (Jaylen Barron) start a relationship, although her father Luther (Peter Macon) disapproves of Carl. He decides to take Carl on a ride-along, which Carl actually enjoys. As Luther goes after a criminal, Carl notices another one fleeing and tackles him.

Fed up with the commune, Debbie (Emma Kenney) asks Frank to get her out of there when she begins laboring, which he does. As they arrive at the Gallagher household, Frank is kidnapped by G-Dog's henchmen and taken away. He is brought to a warehouse, where they plan to torture him. Frank saves himself by claiming he can get them opium. He gets them to the commune, where they get into a shootout with Jupiter, and Frank seizes the opportunity to flee. At the house, the family helps Debbie in safely delivering her baby. Debbie names her child Frances, in honor of Frank. She then leaves in an ambulance, asking to be alone.

== Production ==
The episode was written by executive producer Etan Frankel and directed by Lynn Shelton. It was Frankel's 11th writing credit, and Shelton's first directing credit.

== Reception ==
=== Viewers ===
In its original American broadcast, "Paradise Lost" was seen by an estimated 1.60 million household viewers with a 0.6 in the 18–49 demographics. This means that 0.6 percent of all households with televisions watched the episode. This was a slight decrease in viewership from the previous episode, which was seen by an estimated 1.68 million household viewers with a 0.7 in the 18–49 demographics.

=== Critical reviews ===
"Paradise Lost" received highly positive reviews from critics. Myles McNutt of The A.V. Club gave the episode a "B+" grade and wrote, "While the show has not completely removed my reservations about the storytelling early in the season, the balls in the air at this late stage are in line with the show's basic storytelling goals and create the potential for a redemptive conclusion in the final two episodes."

Leslie Pariseau of Vulture gave the episode a 3 out of 5 star rating and wrote "The episodes ebb and flow around many characters, so it can be difficult to foresee what strange trouble lies ahead and to whom it will befall. This week's episode is a bit itinerant, spending almost equal time on each character's plight, once more drawing everyone back together beneath the Gallagher roof. Except Frank, of course."

Amanda Michelle Steiner of Entertainment Weekly wrote "In any case, “Paradise Lost” was Lip's undoing. And as his life collapsed like a house of cards, Debs brought a new Gallagher into the world. And she named him after Frank. Is Debs a malevolent fertility witch? Why would she do that?" Allyson Johnson of The Young Folks gave the episode a 7 out of 10 rating and wrote "Paradise Lost was too quickly paced to land any real emotional weight, but it sets up stories that could be potentially interesting, but that’s a lot of hopeful thinking."

Dara Driscoll of TV Overmind wrote, "Season six of Shameless has been so good to the viewers. It has been virtually flawless. The character development has been so rich, and the good and bad moments are so well written and acted. It's no wonder Shameless has gone on this long. “Paradise Lost” was full of sweet loving moments, and harsh wake up calls." Paul Dailly of TV Fanatic gave the episode a 4.5 star rating out of 5, and wrote, ""Paradise Lost" was another solid episode of this Showtime drama. We're six seasons in, and the show is still managing to throw great storylines our way."
