= Swipe, Fuck, Leave =

- Shameless episode
- Episode no.: Season 7 Episode 2
- Directed by: Rob Hardy
- Written by: Nancy M. Pimental
- Cinematography by: Loren Yaconelli
- Editing by: Toby Yates
- Original release date: October 9, 2016
- Running time: 50 minutes

Guest appearances
- Sharon Lawrence as Margo Mierzejewski; Tate Ellington as Chad; Ruby Modine as Sierra; Arden Myrin as Dollface Dolores; Jeff Pierre as Caleb; Gary Ballard as Dr. Sachs; Jaylen Barron as Dominique Winslow; Michael Cognata as Tito; Stacie Greenwell as Olga; Jim Hoffmaster as Kermit; Rebecca Metz as Melinda

Episode chronology
← Previous "Hiraeth"	Next → "Home Sweet Homeless Shelter"
- Shameless season 7

"Swipe, Fuck, Leave" is the second episode of the seventh season of the American television comedy drama Shameless, an adaptation of the British series of the same name. It is the 74th overall episode of the series and was written by executive producer Nancy M. Pimental and directed by Rob Hardy. It originally aired on Showtime on October 2, 2016.

The series is set on the South Side of Chicago, Illinois, and depicts the poor, dysfunctional family of Frank Gallagher, a neglectful single father of six: Fiona, Phillip, Ian, Debbie, Carl, and Liam. He spends his days drunk, high, or in search of money, while his children need to learn to take care of themselves. In the episode, Frank blocks the second floor of the house, while Fiona tries to find new ways to save Patsy's.

According to Nielsen Media Research, the episode was seen by an estimated 1.11 million household viewers and gained a 0.4 ratings share among adults aged 18–49. The episode received mostly positive reviews from critics, who praised the humor, performances and character development.

== Plot ==
Fiona (Emmy Rossum) uses a crowbar to open her room, just as Frank (William H. Macy) uses a stair to leave through the window. He goes to the kitchen, telling his children he plans to disown them, with the exception of Liam. He then leaves with Liam, and a credit card that Debbie (Emma Kenney) stole.

Fiona is frustrated that her co-workers at Patsy's often change their shifts without notifying her, causing her to spend more hours in the restaurant. She visits Chad (Tate Ellington) to offer her resignation as manager, but she is informed that the diner's financial state may lead to its closure. To save the diner, she stays, and decides to hire younger waitresses while firing the current ones. Ian (Cameron Monaghan) confronts Caleb (Jeff Pierre) over kissing the woman, but Caleb claims he did not cheat on him as he still believes himself to be gay, arguing no one is "100% anything." The conversation intrigues Ian, who then has sex with a woman for curiosity, but is disgusted by the experience. After discussing with Caleb, Ian breaks off their relationship.

Frank pays three construction workers to build a wall in the staircase, blocking the second floor to the rest of the family. As they are forced to sleep downstairs, Frank uses a stair next to the house to climb and take a girl and Liam with him. Lip starts his internship at a tech company, although he is confused when the FBI arrives to retrieve some servers. Debbie continues stealing strollers, although she is almost caught when she takes a baby with her. Carl (Ethan Cutkosky) is told that he cannot have erections due to his surgery for 3 days, as this breaks his stitches. While Veronica (Shanola Hampton) and Svetlana (Isidora Goreshter) work at the Alibi, Kevin (Steve Howey) is tasked with taking care of the babies and cleaning the house. Kevin only plays with the babies, upsetting Veronica and Svetlana. Seeing a topless maids van, Kevin calls a maid to help him clean, but is disappointed when the "maid" only performs sexual acts. Later, he is inspired to start his own topless maid service with Svetlana and Veronica.

Fiona takes Lip to a club to hang out with one of her co-workers, Sierra (Ruby Modine). On Sierra's advice, Fiona starts online dating and has sex with a man nearby. Veronica is worried over Fiona's new behavior, especially as she still has not talked about Sean or the wedding. Lip and Ian cut off the water supply in the second floor, so Frank retaliates by dropping a raccoon with them. The following morning, Lip and Fiona use sledgehammers to tear down the wall, prompting Frank to escape through the window.

== Production ==
The episode was written by executive producer Nancy M. Pimental and directed by Rob Hardy. It was Pimental's 16th writing credit, and Hardy's first directing credit.

== Reception ==
=== Viewers ===
In its original American broadcast, "Swipe, Fuck, Leave" was seen by an estimated 1.11 million household viewers with a 0.4 in the 18–49 demographics. This means that 0.4 percent of all households with televisions watched the episode. This was a 11% decrease in viewership from the previous episode, which was seen by an estimated 1.24 million household viewers with a 0.5 in the 18–49 demographics.

=== Critical reviews ===
"Swipe, Fuck, Leave" received mostly positive reviews from critics. Myles McNutt of The A.V. Club gave the episode a "B" grade and wrote, "For the most part, “Swipe, Fuck, Leave” continues the positive start from last week, although not because any single storyline is particularly compelling. Rather, it's because the show finds moments where the characters are reflecting on each other's situations, whether it's Lip and Ian making time to have lunch together, the brothers coming to Carl's aid after they see the state of his scarred penis, or even Fiona and Veronica's late night argument and hangover breakdown session."

Christina Ciammaichelli of Entertainment Weekly gave the episode a "B+" grade and wrote "Shameless' second episode was all about a very fierce Fiona and some serious brotherly bonding. Plus, Kevin realized some of the consequences of having two wives."

Dara Driscoll of TV Overmind wrote, "I wonder if Fiona will crash and burn the same way she always does, or if this season will be different. In the end, I really loved this episode, because it balanced the characters well, and it did a lot of new things for the Gallaghers." Paul Dailly of TV Fanatic gave the episode a 4.5 star rating out of 5, and wrote, ""Swipe, F**k, Leave" was another great hour of this Showtime drama. It's crazy that we're on Shameless Season 7 and the show still manages to be as crazy good as the first day itaired."
