= Sleep No More (Shameless) =

- Shameless episode
- Episode no.: Season 6 Episode 11
- Directed by: Anthony Hemingway
- Written by: Sheila Callaghan
- Cinematography by: Kevin McKnight
- Editing by: Mark Sadlek
- Original release date: March 27, 2016
- Running time: 50 minutes

Guest appearances
- Dermot Mulroney as Sean Pierce (special guest star); Isidora Goreshter as Svetlana Milkovich; Pat Healy as Lester; Deirdre Lovejoy as Rita; Peter Macon as Luther Winslow; Jeff Pierre as Caleb; Brett Rickaby as Bruno; Alan Rosenberg as Professor Youens; Jaylen Barron as Dominique Winslow; Michael Patrick McGill as Tommy; Alina Phelan as Florist; Rafi Silver as Woody Martin

Episode chronology
← Previous "Paradise Lost"	Next → "Familia Supra Gallegorious Omnia!"
- Shameless season 6

"Sleep No More" is the eleventh episode of the sixth season of the American television comedy drama Shameless, an adaptation of the British series of the same name. It is the 71st overall episode of the series and was written by co-executive producer Sheila Callaghan and directed by Anthony Hemingway. It originally aired on Showtime on March 27, 2016.

The series is set on the South Side of Chicago, Illinois, and depicts the poor, dysfunctional family of Frank Gallagher, a neglectful single father of six: Fiona, Phillip, Ian, Debbie, Carl, and Liam. He spends his days drunk, high, or in search of money, while his children need to learn to take care of themselves. In the episode, Frank helps Fiona with the wedding expenses, while Lip's alcoholism continues worsening.

According to Nielsen Media Research, the episode was seen by an estimated 1.45 million household viewers and gained a 0.6 ratings share among adults aged 18–49. The episode received highly positive reviews from critics, who praised the fight scene between Frank and Sean, character development and tone.

== Plot ==
With Franny in their lives, the Gallaghers have been losing sleep. Debbie (Emma Kenney) has been the only one taking care of the baby, asking Fiona (Emmy Rossum) not to help her in order to prove herself. Debbie also realizes that she is not allowed to take the baby with her to school, forcing her to seek online classes.

Frank (William H. Macy) convinces Fiona that he can walk her down the aisle at her wedding by providing the money needed for the reception. To do so, Frank visits Derek's family, threatening them with informing the police that Derek committed statutory rape against Debbie. Afraid of the consequences, they pay him to buy his silence. Frank subsequently joins Fiona in checking venues for the wedding. While Fiona is fine with Frank helping, Sean (Dermot Mulroney) is not convinced, especially when a brick is thrown through the window. Ian (Cameron Monaghan) starts working as a trainee EMT, and earns the respect of his colleagues after receiving a rare perfect score in his test.

Lip (Jeremy Allen White) has moved back with his family, although Youens (Alan Rosenberg) still employs him. Lip is later infuriated when Youens tells him he does not care about his personal life, and later drinks heavily. The following day, he arrives late at Youens' class, and insults him in front of the class. Youens takes him outside, and fires Lip as his TA. While studying, Debbie falls asleep and accidentally drops Franny. When Fiona and Sean arrive, Debbie finally declares she needs help. USCIS considers Veronica (Shanola Hampton) and Svetlana (Isidora Goreshter) to be a legitimate marriage, although Kevin (Steve Howey) is disturbed when Veronica says she had sex with Svetlana. Nevertheless, Kevin later decides to participate in a polyamorous relationship with them.

When Sean confronts Frank over the money he received for the wedding, he finally admits Derek's family supplied it, upsetting Fiona and Debbie. As Sean confronts him for putting himself over his family, Frank attacks him and they get into a brawl that extends to the backyard. Fiona and Carl (Ethan Cutkosky) break it off and force Frank to leave, while Fiona scolds Sean for almost ruining his parole. As Ian gets used to the environment in the firehouse, his superior reveals she was notified of his bipolar disorder. Despite scoring a perfect score, she fires him. A drunk Lip takes a crowbar and smashes Youens' car, and he is arrested by the campus officers. In the subway, Frank laments his situation, which is overhead by a man named Bruno (Brett Rickaby). Bruno, who was recently fired, offers to kill Sean for him. Despite only having $2,000, Frank gives it to him and Bruno agrees to go forward with the plan.

== Production ==
The episode was written by co-executive producer Sheila Callaghan and directed by Anthony Hemingway. It was Callaghan's eighth writing credit, and Hemingway's sixth directing credit.

== Reception ==
=== Viewers ===
In its original American broadcast, "Sleep No More" was seen by an estimated 1.45 million household viewers with a 0.6 in the 18–49 demographics. This means that 0.6 percent of all households with televisions watched the episode. This was a 10% decrease in viewership from the previous episode, which was seen by an estimated 1.60 million household viewers with a 0.6 in the 18–49 demographics.

=== Critical reviews ===
"Sleep No More" received highly positive reviews from critics. Myles McNutt of The A.V. Club gave the episode a "B+" grade and wrote, "The effort to rush everything to the Frank-centric finale hasn't always been elegant, but it's generated momentum, and resulted in resonance the show has lacked on the whole this year."

Leslie Pariseau of Vulture gave the episode a 4 out of 5 star rating and wrote "As we barrel toward the end of season six, "Sleep No More" sets up a few important plotlines that sketch an outline for season seven. Many of these threads are driven by the drawing and erasing of boundaries." Amanda Michelle Steiner of Entertainment Weekly wrote "Not a single Gallagher escapes “Sleep No More” unscathed, and I'm looking forward to invoicing Showtime for the therapy I'll surely need after next week's finale. If Lip's actions from last week weren't enough to jeopardize his entire future, Sunday's episode may have landed him back in the neighborhood for good."

Allyson Johnson of The Young Folks gave the episode an 8 out of 10 rating and wrote "After such a messy, uninspired season it will interesting, even a little frustrating, to see if the show can sustain the quality for the last hour of season six." Paul Dailly of TV Fanatic gave the episode a 4 star rating out of 5, and wrote, ""Sleep No More" was a solid episode that at times felt like the calm before the storm. There are a lot of things up in the air as we approach the finale."
