= Hiraeth (Shameless) =

- Shameless episode
- Episode no.: Season 7 Episode 1
- Directed by: Christopher Chulack
- Written by: John Wells
- Cinematography by: Loren Yaconelli
- Editing by: John M. Valerio
- Original release date: October 2, 2016
- Running time: 54 minutes

Guest appearances
- Jason Antoon as Dr. Ruben; Alicia Coppola as Sue; Tate Ellington as Chad; Jeff Pierre as Caleb; Alan Rosenberg as Professor Youens; Rebecca Metz as Melinda; Gary Ballard as Dr. Sachs; Jaylen Barron as Dominique Winslow; Jim Hoffmaster as Kermit; Michael Patrick McGill as Tommy; Sumalee Montano as Turks; Teresa Ornelas as Ellie

Episode chronology
← Previous "Familia Supra Gallegorious Omnia!"	Next → "Swipe, Fuck, Leave"
- Shameless season 7

"Hiraeth" is the first episode of the seventh season of the American television comedy drama Shameless, an adaptation of the British series of the same name. It is the 73rd overall episode of the series and was written by series developer John Wells and directed by executive producer Christopher Chulack. It aired on Showtime on October 2, 2016, but was available online on September 23, 2016.

The series is set on the South Side of Chicago, Illinois, and depicts the poor, dysfunctional family of Frank Gallagher, a neglectful single father of six: Fiona, Phillip, Ian, Debbie, Carl, and Liam. He spends his days drunk, high, or in search of money, while his children need to learn to take care of themselves. In the episode, Frank wakes up from a coma in the hospital, while Ian suspects Caleb might be cheating on him.

According to Nielsen Media Research, the episode was seen by an estimated 1.24 million household viewers and gained a 0.5 ratings share among adults aged 18–49. The episode received mostly positive reviews from critics, who deemed it as a promising start to the season.

== Plot ==
Frank (William H. Macy) wakes up from a coma in the hospital, with the doctors telling him he was retrieved from Lake Michigan one month prior, but Frank does not remember anything about the incident. Frank attempts to flee after learning of his expensive bill, only to completely fall when he tries to stand up. Due to a temporary atrophy, he is forced to use a wheelchair.

Lip (Jeremy Allen White) returns home after completing his 30-day rehabilitation, with Youens (Alan Rosenberg) promising in finding a new job. In the meantime, he helps Fiona (Emmy Rossum) at Patsy's, where she is acting as the temporary manager after Sean's absence. Debbie (Emma Kenney) struggles in raising Franny, so she decides to steal strollers and re-sell them on Internet. With the money, she hires a nanny, Jolayemi, to take care of Franny during the nights and schooltime. Ian (Cameron Monaghan) feels jealous when Caleb (Jeff Pierre) chooses to hang out with a female friend than going on a date with him. While he trusts Caleb, his colleague suggests Caleb might cheat on him.

Kevin (Steve Howey), Veronica (Shanola Hampton) and Svetlana (Isidora Goreshter) continue their polygamous relationship as all three help each other out with their own necessities and running the Alibi together. However, they are shocked when Frank shows up, as they believed he was dead. As Frank is given a drink, he eventually realizes that they, along with his family, threw him into the river and leaves disgusted. He makes his way home, but Fiona kicks him out, and no one is willing to help him. Carl (Ethan Cutkosky) feels disappointed when Dominique (Jaylen Barron) never performs oral sex on him. When he asks her about it, she reveals her discomfort with his penis. Carl retrieves his drug money, and uses it to pay for a circumcision.

Using tools, Frank breaks into the house through the backdoor, steals food and beer, and moves into Fiona's room. He throws away her clothes and uses the tools to nail the door, locking himself. Fiona asks Chad (Tate Ellington), the owner of Patsy's, to find a new manager, but eventually agrees to continue her position with a raise. Kevin and Veronica are informed by Svetlana that their accounts are seeing diminishing returns in the bar and home. Ian and Lip follow Caleb through the city, seeing him meet with the woman. However, Caleb and the woman kiss passionately, upsetting Ian. As Fiona arrives home to find her door locked, Carl arrives shaken from the surgery.

== Production ==
The episode was written by series developer John Wells and directed by executive producer Christopher Chulack. It was Wells' 14th writing credit, and Chulack's eighth directing credit.

== Reception ==
=== Viewers ===
In its original American broadcast, "Hiraeth" was seen by an estimated 1.24 million household viewers with a 0.5 in the 18–49 demographics. This means that 0.5 percent of all households with televisions watched the episode. This was a 24% decrease in viewership from the previous episode, which was seen by an estimated 1.63 million household viewers with a 0.7 in the 18–49 demographics.

=== Critical reviews ===
"Hiraeth" received mostly positive reviews from critics. Myles McNutt of The A.V. Club gave the episode a "B+" grade and wrote, "The seventh season begins in a strong place not because it's breaking new ground, but because it leans into a stable foundation that can be productively tested in the weeks that follow. It's not the show's flashiest premiere, but it's a solid building block, and that's exactly what Shameless needs if it's not willing to blow things up and start fresh."

Christina Ciammaichelli of Entertainment Weekly wrote "Some of my favorite scenes in Shameless are when Lip and Ian team up or when Lip and Fiona do something together. Thankfully, with Lip back from rehab and college, this episode had both." Allyson Johnson of The Young Folks gave the episode a 6 out of 10 rating and wrote "Not a hugely promising start but, regardless, if we've hung in this far we likely adore many of these characters and they're not easy to give up on."

Dara Driscoll of TV Overmind wrote, "I loved this first episode. It covered every important character in Shameless and it showed that the series is still as strong as ever. I cannot wait to see what the Shameless writers have concocted for this season; I can only hope for them to match the roller coaster of emotions in the previous seasons." Paul Dailly of TV Fanatic gave the episode a 4.5 star rating out of 5, and wrote, ""Hiraeth" was a solid opening to Shameless Season 7. It's crazy that we're this late in the game and there are still no signs of fatigue."
