= You'll Never Ever Get a Chicken in Your Whole Entire Life =

- Shameless episode
- Episode no.: Season 7 Episode 7
- Directed by: John Wells
- Written by: Nancy M. Pimental
- Cinematography by: Loren Yaconelli
- Editing by: Omar Hassan-Reep
- Original release date: November 13, 2016
- Running time: 54 minutes

Guest appearances
- June Squibb as Etta (special guest star); Sharon Lawrence as Margo Mierzejewski; Elliot Fletcher as Trevor; Pasha Lychnikoff as Yvon; Ruby Modine as Sierra; Arden Myrin as Dollface Dolores; Zack Pearlman as Neil; Alan Rosenberg as Professor Youens; Van Epperson as Guidance Counselor; Chet Hanks as Charlie; Jim Hoffmaster as Kermit; Lela Lee as Lenore; Michael Patrick McGill as Tommy; Jennifer Taylor as Anne Seery; Ilia Volok as Vlad

Episode chronology
← Previous "The Defenestration of Frank"	Next → "You Sold Me the Laundromat, Remember?"
- Shameless season 7

"You'll Never Ever Get a Chicken in Your Whole Entire Life" is the seventh episode of the seventh season of the American television comedy drama Shameless, an adaptation of the British series of the same name. It is the 79th overall episode of the series and was written by executive producer Nancy M. Pimental and directed by series developer John Wells. It originally aired on Showtime on November 13, 2016.

The series is set on the South Side of Chicago, Illinois, and depicts the poor, dysfunctional family of Frank Gallagher, a neglectful single father of six: Fiona, Phillip, Ian, Debbie, Carl, and Liam. He spends his days drunk, high, or in search of money, while his children need to learn to take care of themselves. In the episode, Fiona discovers the challenges of repairing the laundromat, while Frank tries to help Liam in enrolling into a school. Meanwhile, Debbie drops out of high school to marry Neil, while Kevin and Veronica ask Svetlana to get rid of Yvon.

According to Nielsen Media Research, the episode was seen by an estimated 1.33 million household viewers and gained a 0.5 ratings share among adults aged 18–49. The episode received generally positive reviews from critics, who praised the character development and performances.

== Plot ==
Frank (William H. Macy) pours gasoline over the homeless shelter, preparing to burn it down after being kicked out. He is approached by Liam, who asks for his help as his school is closed. Frank accompanies him, and discovers that the school was permanently closed due to lack of students, who chose to go to a new private school built on an old church.

Debbie (Emma Kenney) prepares for her visit from DCFS, and she decides to take desperate measures; she drops out of high school after completing her GED exam, and proceeds to marry Neil (Zack Pearlman) to build a positive image of her family. Fiona (Emmy Rossum) starts organizing the laundromat, but discovers that the building is in a dilapidated state. To complicate matters, every reparation leads to more contractors, increasing the costs of the venue and forcing her to take money from the safe in Patsy's. Etta (June Squibb) is also unable to help, as she starts exhibiting symptoms of dementia. When Debbie asks for Fiona to accompany her to officiate the marriage, Fiona refuses to go.

Frank visits the private school, and is disgusted by how they ruined other people's education. He is forced to leave, although he stays on the sidewalk to insult the kids and teachers as they leave. The principal finally meets with Frank, explaining that she sympathizes with him, as they both were punished in the same church. She surprises Frank by offering to let Liam enroll in the school for free, and Frank accepts. Lip (Jeremy Allen White) continues his relationship with Sierra (Ruby Modine), and is visited by Youens (Alan Rosenberg) with some news; he issued a formal apology on his behalf and the local university granted his request to appeal his case. While Youens and Sierra ask him to attend the hearing, Lip is not interested. That night, he goes out with Sierra while she leaves her son Lucas to spend the day with his father, Charlie (Chet Hanks), a recovering drug addict. Their date is interrupted when Charlie abandons Lucas, and Sierra regrets trusting her ex again.

Kevin (Steve Howey) and Veronica (Shanola Hampton) are fed up with Yvon (Pasha Lychnikoff) in their lives, so Svetlana (Isidora Goreshter) promises to take care of the situation. They are shocked when Svetlana, in blood-splattered clothes, arrives and proclaims that Yvon is officially gone from their lives. While Veronica is willing to move past whatever happened, Kevin is still shaken as he is unsure of Yvon's fate. Ian (Cameron Monaghan) and Trevor (Elliot Fletcher) continue their sexual relationship, with both agreeing to experiment with different positions. Frank prepares Liam for the school, and is moved when he says "You're a good dad" and hugs him. Fiona talks with Margo (Sharon Lawrence), who warns her that she cannot risk all her money on the laundromat. Fiona considers giving up the laundromat, but changes her mind the following day and deposits the $80,000 check in Etta's account.

== Production ==
=== Development ===
The episode was written by executive producer Nancy M. Pimental and directed by series developer John Wells. It was Pimental's 17th writing credit, and Wells' fifth directing credit.

== Reception ==
=== Viewers ===
In its original American broadcast, "You'll Never Ever Get a Chicken in Your Whole Entire Life" was seen by an estimated 1.33 million household viewers with a 0.5 in the 18–49 demographics. This means that 0.5 percent of all households with televisions watched the episode. This was a 8% decrease in viewership from the previous episode, which was seen by an estimated 1.44 million household viewers with a 0.5 in the 18–49 demographics.

=== Critical reviews ===
"You'll Never Ever Get a Chicken in Your Whole Entire Life" received generally positive reviews from critics. Myles McNutt of The A.V. Club gave the episode a "B–" grade and wrote, "None of this is a “bad direction.” Shameless is in solid shape right now, and nothing here necessarily undoes that, but where the show goes depends on the choices the writers have the characters make, and thus there's a lot riding on these next few episodes."

Christina Ciammaichelli of Entertainment Weekly gave the episode a "B+" grade and wrote "There's lots of love going around for several Gallaghers this episode, which featured more heartwarming moments than we're used to in Shameless. Plus: Liam has more lines than he's had in the entire series so far, and Fiona starts to see the negative aspects of her spur-of-the-moment investment." Paul Dailly of TV Fanatic gave the episode a 4.5 star rating out of 5, and wrote, ""You'll Never Ever Get a Chicken in Your Whole Entire Life" was another solid episode of this Showtime drama. The show is continuing to put out solid episodes after all these years and I can't wait to see what's in store for the rest of the season."
