= Familia Supra Gallegorious Omnia! =

- Shameless episode
- Episode no.: Season 6 Episode 12
- Directed by: Christopher Chulack
- Written by: John Wells
- Cinematography by: Kevin McKnight
- Editing by: John M. Valerio
- Original release date: April 3, 2016
- Running time: 56 minutes

Guest appearances
- Dermot Mulroney as Sean Pierce (special guest star); Isidora Goreshter as Svetlana Milkovich; Mike Hagerty as Ron; Deirdre Lovejoy as Rita; Peter Macon as Luther Winslow; Jeff Pierre as Caleb; Brett Rickaby as Bruno; Alan Rosenberg as Professor Youens; Frankie Jay Allison as Joe; Jaylen Barron as Dominique Winslow; Amber Friendly as Alonso; Jim Hoffmaster as Kermit; Michael Patrick McGill as Tommy; Gino Montesinos as Rinaldo; Onahoua Rodriguez as Dr. Ortiz; Rafi Silver as Woody Martin

Episode chronology
← Previous "Sleep No More"	Next → "Hiraeth"
- Shameless season 6

"Familia Supra Gallegorious Omnia!" is the twelfth episode and season finale of the sixth season of the American television comedy drama Shameless, an adaptation of the British series of the same name. It is the 72nd overall episode of the series and was written by series developer John Wells and directed by executive producer Christopher Chulack. It originally aired on Showtime on April 3, 2016.

The series is set on the South Side of Chicago, Illinois, and depicts the poor, dysfunctional family of Frank Gallagher, a neglectful single father of six: Fiona, Phillip, Ian, Debbie, Carl, and Liam. He spends his days drunk, high, or in search of money, while his children need to learn to take care of themselves. In the episode, Fiona prepares for her wedding day, while Frank decides to kill Sean himself.

According to Nielsen Media Research, the episode was seen by an estimated 1.63 million household viewers and gained a 0.7 ratings share among adults aged 18–49. The episode received mixed-to-positive reviews from critics, who praised the episode's performances and pacing, but criticized the season's overall character arcs.

== Plot ==
In the early morning, Frank (William H. Macy) sneaks off into the house. Taking revenge against Sean (Dermot Mulroney), he urinates in his boots and steals his credit card. He then uses his card to buy $200 gift cards in order to pay Bruno (Brett Rickaby) to do the hit.

Lip is sent to jail, where he faces charges for assaulting a police officer. He is later bailed out by Youens (Alan Rosenberg), who warns him he is expelled from campus. Youens instructs Lip to go to rehabilitation, as his alcoholism is worsening. Lip agrees, but postpones until the following day to attend the wedding. He goes to the Alibi, where Kevin (Steve Howey) and the patrons are shocked by his expulsion, with Kevin noting he is reminding him of Frank. Frank meets with Bruno at a warehouse, but Bruno claims not to know what he is talking about. Realizing he was scammed, he contacts a colleague to supply him with a gun. When Patsy's closes, Frank breaks a window and enters Sean's office.

Ian (Cameron Monaghan) fails in finding a new job. After talking with Caleb (Jeff Pierre), Ian returns to the firehouse, telling his superior, Rita (Deirdre Lovejoy), that he will not be excluded for his condition and that he only did what was needed to get a job. When a call is heard, the other EMT paramedics refuse to answer without Ian, prompting Rita to reluctantly allow Ian back. Carl (Ethan Cutkosky) tries to hang out more with Luther (Peter Macon), but Luther makes it clear he will never like him nor support his relationship with Dominique (Jaylen Barron). Debbie (Emma Kenney) almost misses the wedding due to having to take care of Franny, but ends up showing up at the church on time, delighting Fiona (Emmy Rossum).

Before the wedding begins, Frank unexpectedly arrives, intending to walk Fiona down the aisle. When the family opposes, Frank goes on a tirade, scolding his kids for never supporting him. He then reveals that he sneaked into Sean's office, and discovered a secret box with heroin that Sean has been using, devastating Fiona as she was not aware. The family is aghast by Frank's actions; Will (Reed Emmons) runs away from the wedding ashamed, and Lip punches Frank in the face. Outside the church, Sean confirms he fell back into addiction and that he has been using it almost daily for the past few months. He then leaves Fiona, hoping to save his situation with Will. Lip has a conversation with Debbie, who advises him that she does not want him to end up like Frank. Finally realizing the extent of his actions, Lip has Youens drive him to the rehabilitation center. The rest of the family kidnap Frank and drop him down a freezing river.

== Production ==
The episode was written by series developer John Wells and directed by executive producer Christopher Chulack. It was Wells' 13th writing credit, and Chulack's seventh directing credit.

== Reception ==
=== Viewers ===
In its original American broadcast, "Familia Supra Gallegorious Omnia!" was seen by an estimated 1.63 million household viewers with a 0.7 in the 18–49 demographics. This means that 0.7 percent of all households with televisions watched the episode. This was a 12% increase in viewership from the previous episode, which was seen by an estimated 1.45 million household viewers with a 0.6 in the 18–49 demographics.

=== Critical reviews ===
"Familia Supra Gallegorious Omnia!" received mixed-to-positive reviews from critics, many of whom expressed dissatisfaction with the conclusion to Fiona and Sean's relationship. Myles McNutt of The A.V. Club gave the episode a "B" grade and expressed mixed feelings on Fiona and Sean's overall relationship, writing "Dermot Mulroney brought nuance to the role, but Sean was always an arbitrary presence in the Gallaghers’ life. [...] I wasn't surprised when Mulroney never evolved to a series regular, because why would he? What would justify Sean becoming part of this show; or, put another way, what would justify Fiona agreeing to marry Sean?" Commenting on the season as a whole, McNutt wrote, "The thematic cohesion of this finale is valuable and often compelling, but it can't fully hide how inconsistently drawn these stories were throughout the season. Although rarely outright terrible, the sixth season of Shameless was underwhelming because of the way it moved from point to point. [...] Without a clear sense of where they intended to end our glimpse into the Gallagher's lives, we're going to get seasons like this one that hit intermittent beats without making much in the way of music in between."

Allyson Johnson of The Young Folks gave the episode a 7.5 out of 10 rating. Johnson enjoyed the dramatic elements of the episode, but criticized the conclusion to Fiona and Sean's storyline, writing "If this is the last we see of [Sean] it would be a shame not only because Dermot Mulroney has done a lot with a little but mainly due to how inconsequential his relationship with Fiona will feel. What was the overall point if the ending was once again Fiona being screwed over by a guy?" Johnson ultimately gave the sixth season an 6 out of 10, criticizing the season's overall pacing and storylines: "It almost goes without saying that season six of Shameless has been a touch sloppy. Inconsequential, poorly plotted with stories that have sent characterizations into deep dives, it certainly hasn't touched the very best that the show could do, and isn’t even as good as the largely panned season five. The season finale hints at a return to form, but is it little too late?"

David Crow of Den of Geek gave the episode a 3.5 star rating out of 5, expressing dissatisfaction with the writers' decision to have Sean relapse: "For a man shown to be such a grounding influence on Fiona in season 5, the idea that he has been using heroin for the last half of season 6 to "take the edge off" and that he doesn't even see the problem in it just feels like a sloppy way to rob Fiona of any sort of stability or center again." Nevertheless, Crow praised Macy and Rossum's respective performances during the scene where Frank reveals Sean's relapse, writing "The scene is a beautiful nightmare that both Macy and Rossum sell the hell out of in truly grim form. Macy is at his nastiest and most intentionally unforgivable, proving that even as the age of the "television anti-hero" sunsets, few have been more despicable than Frank Gallagher. Rossum, meanwhile, is nothing short of heartbreaking at conveying the sense of betrayal and bottled rage that has become a Fi trademark." Paul Dailly of TV Fanatic gave the episode a 3.5 star rating out of 5, and wrote, ""Familia Supra Gallegorious Omnia" was a low key finale. There were a lot of personal achievements for the characters, but at times it felt a little disjointed and could have moved along at a brisker pace."

Leslie Pariseau of Vulture gave the episode a 4 out of 5 star rating, praising Rossum's performance and the season's overall themes: "After six seasons, we all know the Gallaghers very well. And we know the hope, denial, and disappointment they perpetuate can sometimes mirror an addiction to trauma and drama. The Gallaghers are caught in a cycle, and, at the culmination of season six, we have hit the bottom of its weird, dark circuit." Amanda Michelle Steiner of Entertainment Weekly commented highly on the realistic writing of the episode and the character's overall story arcs: "I have to give the show credit for not taking the easy way out. Debs was never going to get an abortion, nor was motherhood going to be a smooth ride. Lip was not going to just go to college and be able to shake off 18 years of a royally messed-up childhood. That’s not real life. Real life is messy, and it can be frustrating and draining to see it reflected back at you, but at this point, a happy ending for the Gallaghers would have been unrealistic, out of character, and safe."

=== Accolades ===
TVLine named Jeremy Allen White as an honorable mention for the "Performer of the Week" for the week of April 9, 2016, for his performance in the episode. The site wrote, "Watching Shameless' Lip come to the realization during Sunday’s season finale that he is following in his drunken father's footsteps was, simply put, heartbreaking. One of the most underrated performers on the Showtime drama, Jeremy Allen White expertly conveyed his character's rebellious denial and reluctant acceptance of his problems. When his little sister Debbie expressed her concerns about his behavior, it was the final straw for Lip. Sitting in front of a rehab facility with his mentor, his voice broke and his eyes watered as he confessed that he couldn’t afford treatment. Although the bill was ultimately taken care of, Lip nonetheless dawdled apprehensively outside the building as White's face filled with fear and anxiety. We would never wish ill upon Lip, but when it gives Allen the opportunity to deliver such a raw, emotional performance, the character’s pain almost seems worth it."
