= Ouroboros (Shameless) =

- Shameless episode
- Episode no.: Season 7 Episode 9
- Directed by: Christopher Chulack
- Written by: Sheila Callaghan
- Cinematography by: Loren Yaconelli
- Editing by: Omar Hassan-Reep
- Original release date: November 27, 2016
- Running time: 52 minutes

Guest appearances
- June Squibb as Etta (special guest star); Chloe Webb as Monica Gallagher (special guest star); Elliot Fletcher as Trevor; Bayne Gibby as Mallory; Ruby Modine as Sierra; Zack Pearlman as Neil; Alan Rosenberg as Professor Youens; Laura Cerón as Celia Delgado; Chiquita Fuller as Yolanda; Michael Patrick McGill as Tommy; Gabrielle Walsh as Tanya Delgado

Episode chronology
← Previous "You Sold Me the Laundromat, Remember?"	Next → "Ride or Die"
- Shameless season 7

"Ouroboros" is the ninth episode of the seventh season of the American television comedy drama Shameless, an adaptation of the British series of the same name. It is the 81st overall episode of the series and was written by executive producer Sheila Callaghan and directed by executive producer Christopher Chulack. It originally aired on Showtime on November 27, 2016.

The series is set on the South Side of Chicago, Illinois, and depicts the poor, dysfunctional family of Frank Gallagher, a neglectful single father of six: Fiona, Phillip, Ian, Debbie, Carl, and Liam. He spends his days drunk, high, or in search of money, while his children need to learn to take care of themselves. In the episode, Monica returns, but her family ignores her. Meanwhile, Fiona is obsessed with a negative review of the laundromat, while Lip goes on a downward spiral.

According to Nielsen Media Research, the episode was seen by an estimated 1.56 million household viewers and gained a 0.6 ratings share among adults aged 18–49. The episode received highly positive reviews from critics, who praised Monica's twist ending.

== Plot ==
As Frank (William H. Macy) is kicked out of the Alibi, he is surprised when Monica (Chloe Webb) shows up. She wants to talk and apologize for her recent actions, but Frank is not interested in listening and goes back to the laundromat. The rest of the family also ignores her.

Finding that Debbie (Emma Kenney) is now a mother, Monica decides to take matters in her hands to get Franny back. She takes a baseball bat and angrily smashes Derek's family's porch. As they arrive with Franny on a stroller, Monica and Debbie take her back. Grateful, Debbie allows her to live with her and Neil (Zack Pearlman). Fiona (Emmy Rossum) re-opens the laundromat to the public, asking the customers to post Yelp reviews. However, she is distracted when a user posts a negative review of the establishment. When the reviewer shows up at Patsy's, Fiona insults her for her comment. Frank continues tending Etta (June Squibb), whose dementia makes her often forget who Frank is.

Lip (Jeremy Allen White) has returned to alcohol, hiding it in his coffee during his work hours. He attempts to fix things with Sierra (Ruby Modine), but she ignores him. Youens (Alan Rosenberg) visits him and offers him an interview for a paid internship. While Lip promises to give it a chance, he does not bother in setting the meeting. Noticing that Sierra bought a new apartment for her and her son, Lip sneaks in to fix her pipe. As they appear to reconcile, Sierra realizes Lip returned to alcohol and kicks him out. Monica reunites with Ian (Cameron Monaghan), who allows her to accompany him on a date with Trevor (Elliot Fletcher). However, Trevor does not want to go to a nightclub, despite being an adult with ID. When Ian pressures him, Trevor finally reveals that his ID was before his transition and walks off.

Kevin (Steve Howey) convinces Veronica (Shanola Hampton) and Svetlana (Isidora Goreshter) in going to couple's therapy. While Veronica is not enthralled with the experience, Kevin feels happy and reconciles with his wife. However, they discover that Svetlana somehow has become the owner of the Alibi without consulting them. Monica accompanies Debbie in her DCFS hearing, where the officer declares that Franny must stay with Debbie. Frank runs into Monica, who finally reveals the purpose of her visit; she has brain damage and is dying, causing Frank to cry on her. That night, the Gallaghers are visited by a police detective, who informs Ian that Mickey escaped from prison the prior night.

== Production ==
=== Development ===
The episode was written by executive producer Sheila Callaghan and directed by executive producer Christopher Chulack. It was Callaghan's tenth writing credit, and Chulack's tenth directing credit.

== Reception ==
=== Viewers ===
In its original American broadcast, "Ouroboros" was seen by an estimated 1.56 million household viewers with a 0.6 in the 18–49 demographics. This means that 0.6 percent of all households with televisions watched the episode. This was a 11% increase in viewership from the previous episode, which was seen by an estimated 1.40 million household viewers with a 0.5 in the 18–49 demographics.

=== Critical reviews ===
"Ouroboros" received highly positive reviews from critics. Myles McNutt of The A.V. Club gave the episode an "A–" grade and wrote, "in context, “Ouroboros” does a nice job using Monica's return to reinforce — rather than exaggerate — the dramatic stakes of the season thus far. While she has moments of mania, for the most part her presence is used as a fresh set of eyes."

Christina Ciammaichelli of Entertainment Weekly gave the episode a "B+" grade and wrote "Hurricane Monica returned to the South Side this week, much to everyone's excitement. Plus, Fiona confronted a Yelper the way we all wish we could, Debbie got Franny back, and Svetlana did more shady stuff." Paul Dailly of TV Fanatic gave the episode a perfect 5 star rating out of 5, and wrote, ""Ouroboros" was up there as one of the best episodes of the entire series. There was so much to like about the hour. It sent the show in an interesting direction as we approach what could be the conclusion of the series."
