= You Sold Me the Laundromat, Remember? =

- Shameless episode
- Episode no.: Season 7 Episode 8
- Directed by: Allison Liddi-Brown
- Written by: Krista Vernoff
- Cinematography by: Loren Yaconelli
- Editing by: Toby Yates
- Original release date: November 20, 2016
- Running time: 54 minutes

Guest appearances
- June Squibb as Etta (special guest star); Elliot Fletcher as Trevor; Ruby Modine as Sierra; Zack Pearlman as Neil; Alan Rosenberg as Professor Youens; Laura Cerón as Celia Delgado; Chet Hanks as Charlie; Jim Hoffmaster as Kermit; Karen Huie as Tina; Gary Kraus as Mike; Michael Patrick McGill as Tommy; Gabrielle Walsh as Tanya Delgado; George Wyner as Provost Keegan

Episode chronology
← Previous "You'll Never Ever Get a Chicken in Your Whole Entire Life"	Next → "Ouroboros"
- Shameless season 7

"You Sold Me the Laundromat, Remember?" is the eighth episode of the seventh season of the American television comedy drama Shameless, an adaptation of the British series of the same name. It is the 80th overall episode of the series and was written by executive producer Krista Vernoff and directed by Allison Liddi-Brown. It originally aired on Showtime on November 20, 2016.

The series is set on the South Side of Chicago, Illinois, and depicts the poor, dysfunctional family of Frank Gallagher, a neglectful single father of six: Fiona, Phillip, Ian, Debbie, Carl, and Liam. He spends his days drunk, high, or in search of money, while his children need to learn to take care of themselves. In the episode, Fiona tries desperately in renovating the laundromat, while Frank surprises by helping. Meanwhile, Lip attends his university hearing, and Kevin's suspicions about Svetlana arise.

According to Nielsen Media Research, the episode was seen by an estimated 1.40 million household viewers and gained a 0.5 ratings share among adults aged 18–49. The episode received generally positive reviews from critics, who praised the performances and tone. For the episode, William H. Macy received a nomination for Outstanding Lead Actor in a Comedy Series at the 69th Primetime Emmy Awards.

== Plot ==
Fiona (Emmy Rossum) has not been at home, opting to stay at the laundromat to fix it when she runs out of money to pay the contractors. However, she continues running into problems, and as she has closed the laundromat, she is losing money. Etta (June Squibb) buys unnecessary items, so Fiona takes care of her credit card.

Ian (Cameron Monaghan) and Trevor (Elliot Fletcher) have officially become a couple, and he now helps him in the house. Ian prevents Frank (William H. Macy) from entering, but reluctantly allows him to take Liam to school. Discovering that Fiona bought the laundromat, Frank decides to sneak into the house and fix the washing machine and toilet. While he fixes the latter, the former breaks down. He subsequently pays men to take the functioning washing machine from the homeless shelter and put it in the house. Nevertheless, Ian kicks him out and he is chased by the angry mob of the homeless shelter.

Debbie (Emma Kenney), believing that Derek's family contacted DCFS, decides that she needs to build a good relationship with them. She invites his mother and sister to help her with Franny, allowing them in visiting her and Neil (Zack Pearlman). Kevin (Steve Howey) is shocked when his van disappears, and later discovers that Svetlana (Isidora Goreshter) took it to cash in the insurance money. As Svetlana reveals that she only moved it somewhere, Kevin also discovers that she is running a fake ID operation. He talks about this with Veronica (Shanola Hampton), but Veronica is willing to let it pass. Realizing his wife does not even support him, Kevin walks out to help Fiona at the laundromat. When he asks her if Svetlana is conning them, Fiona suggests she might be.

Lip (Jeremy Allen White) attends his university hearing, where Ian and Youens (Alan Rosenberg) vouch for him. While the committee agrees that he might have a bright future, they inform him he will remain expelled. A drunk Lip later sees Sierra (Ruby Modine) arguing with Charlie (Chet Hanks) again, so he gets Charlie outside and brutally beats him until Ian stops him. He later visits Sierra to apologize, but she instead breaks up with him, explaining that she cannot deal with another addict in her life. Debbie discovers that Neil let Derek's family take Franny, and they refuse to hand the baby back. Debbie goes on a rant outside their house, which is recorded by them. Kevin convinces some bar patrons, including Frank, to help Fiona in fixing the laundromat for one free week of beer. After finishing, Frank dances with Etta, who believes he is her late husband, and Fiona allows him to sleep in the laundromat.

== Production ==
=== Development ===
The episode was written by executive producer Krista Vernoff and directed by Allison Liddi-Brown. It was Vernoff's seventh writing credit, and Liddi-Brown's first directing credit.

== Reception ==
=== Viewers ===
In its original American broadcast, "You Sold Me the Laundromat, Remember?" was seen by an estimated 1.40 million household viewers with a 0.5 in the 18–49 demographics. This means that 0.5 percent of all households with televisions watched the episode. This was a slight increase in viewership from the previous episode, which was seen by an estimated 1.33 million household viewers with a 0.5 in the 18–49 demographics.

=== Critical reviews ===
"You Sold Me the Laundromat, Remember?" received generally positive reviews from critics. Myles McNutt of The A.V. Club gave the episode a "B–" grade and wrote, "We're now at a crucial turning point for the throuple, and I'll be curious to see how the last act of the season deals with it: is this a storyline that is about to be dissolved, or rather one that is going to mutate and continue in potential future seasons? I'm not sure where they'll land on that, but I appreciate the shift toward emotional resonance we see here."

Christina Ciammaichelli of Entertainment Weekly gave the episode a "B+" grade and wrote "Tonight's Shameless feels like it may have taken place in an alternate universe. Frank actually doing something good for his family? Fiona coming out on top after what seemed like the world's worst investment move? With the exception of more poor decision-making from Debbie and Lip, this hour almost made you feel like things could finally be looking up for the ‘ol Gallagher clan." Paul Dailly of TV Fanatic gave the episode a 3.5 star rating out of 5, and wrote, ""You Sold Me The Laundromat, Remember?" was the weakest episode of the season. A lot of the characters were doing questionable things and made me dislike some of them."

=== Accolades ===
William H. Macy submitted the episode to support his nomination for Outstanding Lead Actor in a Comedy Series at the 69th Primetime Emmy Awards. He would lose the award to Donald Glover for Atlanta.
