= Friends Academy (Massachusetts) =

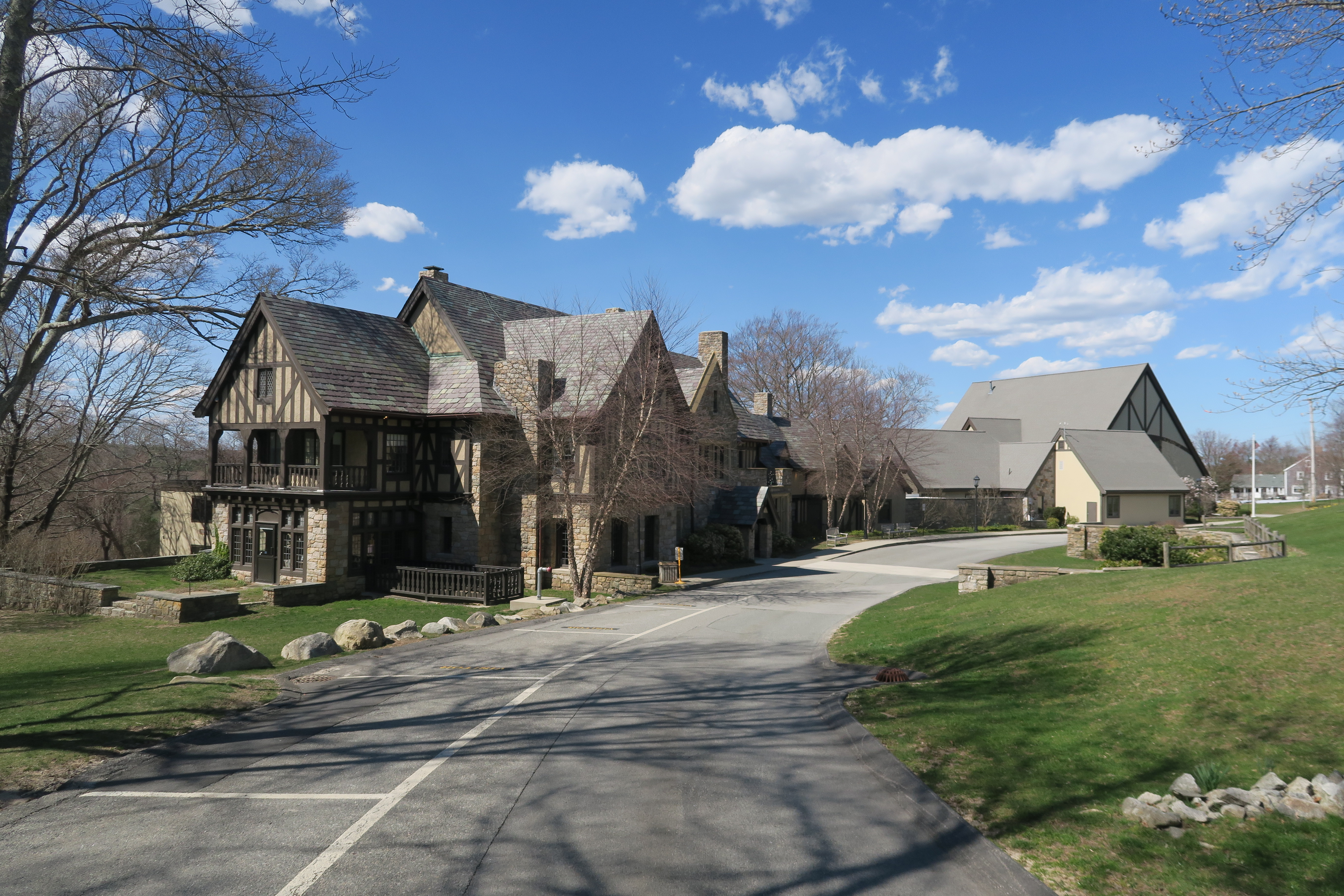
- Friends Academy

Location
- North Dartmouth, Massachusetts; 02747; United States
- Coordinates: 41°37′28″N 70°58′57″W

Information
- Type: Independent
- Established: 1810; 216 years ago
- Head of school: Benjamin Kennedy
- Grades: Preschool to Eighth grade
- Gender: Coeducational
- Enrollment: 250
- Campus size: 65 acres
- Colors: blue & gray
- Website: https://www.friendsacademy1810.org

Friends Academy is an independent day school in North Dartmouth, Massachusetts founded in 1810. Its academic programs run from preschool to eighth grade.

== History ==
Friends Academy was founded in 1810 by members of the Religious Society of Friends (Quakers) from New Bedford, Dartmouth, and the surrounding area. It incorporated in 1812. The campus was first located on County Street in New Bedford. It later moved to a building on Morgan Street.

The school moved to its current Dartmouth campus in 1949. Formerly the site of the Tucker farm and later the Herring family estate, the property was donated to the school by the heirs of the Herrings. Friends Academy's early childhood education program is housed in the Tucker farmhouse, built circa 1813. The school also occupies the former Herring mansion (grades K-5) and the Stites building (grades 6–8).

=== End of Quaker affiliation ===
The school's board of trustees was originally required to maintain a Quaker majority. This practice remains common at other Friends Schools (e.g. Moses Brown School). Board members tended to be wealthy and influential members of the Society of Friends, and were expected to give a set percentage of their income to the school. At some point, a wealthy trustee balked this requirement and became a Unitarian. Hoping to make peace (or perhaps to retain the continued support of the rich trustee) the board voted to allow non-Quakers as members. With no restrictions on Quaker majority, the school soon dropped its religious affiliation and ceased to be a Friends school. However, the school still has some faint links to the Quaker community: each year the graduating class holds a pre-commencement ceremony at Apponegansett Meeting House that is similar to a Quaker meeting for worship.

== Academics ==
Friends Academy has programs for:

- Early childhood—Ages 3–5 (Half- and full-day programs)
- Lower school—Grades K–5
- Middle school—Grades 6–8

== Athletic and extracurricular activities ==
The school offers lacrosse, soccer, basketball, girls' field hockey, track, and cross country for students in Grades 5–8.

== Campus facilities ==
Friends Academy is set on a 65-acre (26 ha) wooded campus in North Dartmouth. The Paskamanset River runs along the campus's western boundary, providing a place for hands-on science and environmental lessons. The campus is also home to a high and low ropes course, a solar field, a meditation grove, a mile of trails, two athletic fields, and two playgrounds.

The early childhood program is housed in a newly renovated 18th-century farmhouse, lending the program the informal name "The Farmhouse." Children in this program have their own playground, which includes slides, swings, a sand play area, a stage, and large, mature trees.
