= Etan Frankel =

American dramatist

- Education: Duke University (BA); Juilliard School (GrDip)
- Writing career
- Notable works: Friday Night Lights, Shameless

Etan Frankel is an American playwright and television writer and producer.

== Career ==
Frankel got his start as a playwright, writing a number of plays including Create Fate, The Fearless, and Truth and Reconciliation, which won the Williamstown Theatre Festival's 2006 Weissberger Playwriting Award.

He began writing for television for the second season of Gossip Girl in 2008. He wrote the episodes "There Might be Blood" and "The Grandfather". He joined the crew of Friday Night Lights as a writer for the series fourth season in 2009. He wrote the episode "A Sort of Homecoming". He was nominated for the Writers Guild of America (WGA) Award for Best Drama Series at the February 2010 ceremony for his work on the fourth season.

In 2011, Frankel joined the first season staff of the Showtime dramedy Shameless, as executive story editor and writer. He served as writer and producer through to 2016. Subsequent projects included episodes of Animal Kingdom, Get Shorty and Sorry for Your Loss.

In June 2021, Frankel created and executive produced the limited series Joe vs. Carole. In 2026, Frankel had signed a deal with Fox Entertainment Studios.
