= Arden Myrin =

American actress and comedian

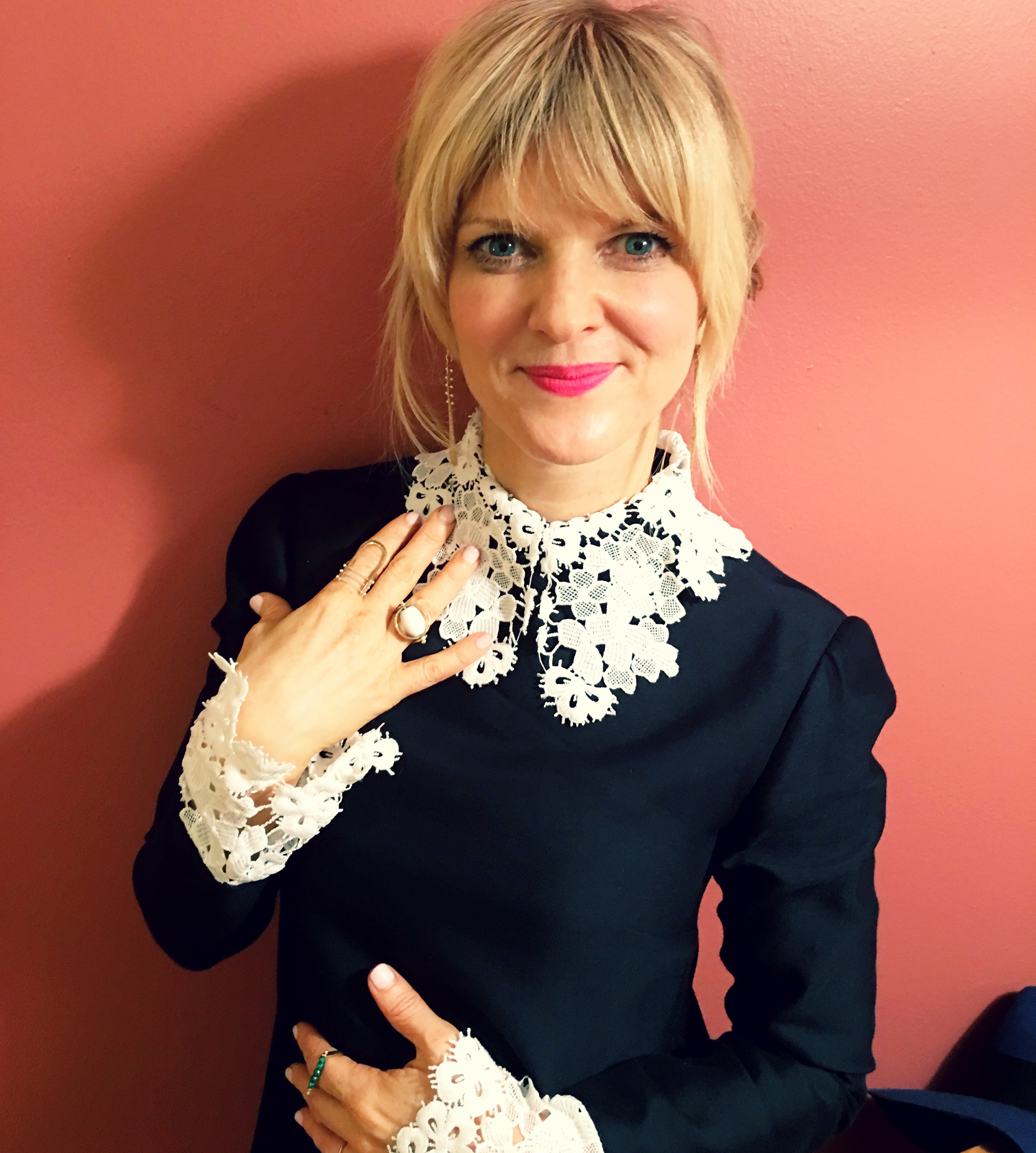
- Myrin at the opening night of Steve Martin's play Meteor Shower in October 2016
- Born: Little Compton, Rhode Island, U.S.
- Occupations: Actress, comedian
- Years active: 1996–present
- Spouse: Dan Martin (m. 2007; div. 2021)

Arden Myrin (/məˈriːn/) is an American actress and comedian. Myrin was a cast member on the Netflix series Insatiable, playing the role of Regina Sinclair. She was a cast member of Mad TV for the last four seasons along with Keegan-Michael Key, Jordan Peele, Ike Barinholtz, and Bobby Lee.

== Early life and education ==
Myrin was born in Little Compton, Rhode Island, a quiet seaside village. Her father was an accountant and her mother was a real estate agent. She has an older brother, Alarik. As a child, she staged her neighborhood plays and enjoyed seeing Annie on Broadway. Myrin attended Friends Academy in Dartmouth, Massachusetts for her middle school years. She graduated from Middlesex School, in Concord, Massachusetts, for high school. She attended Colorado College. She is of Swedish and Norwegian heritage.

== Career ==
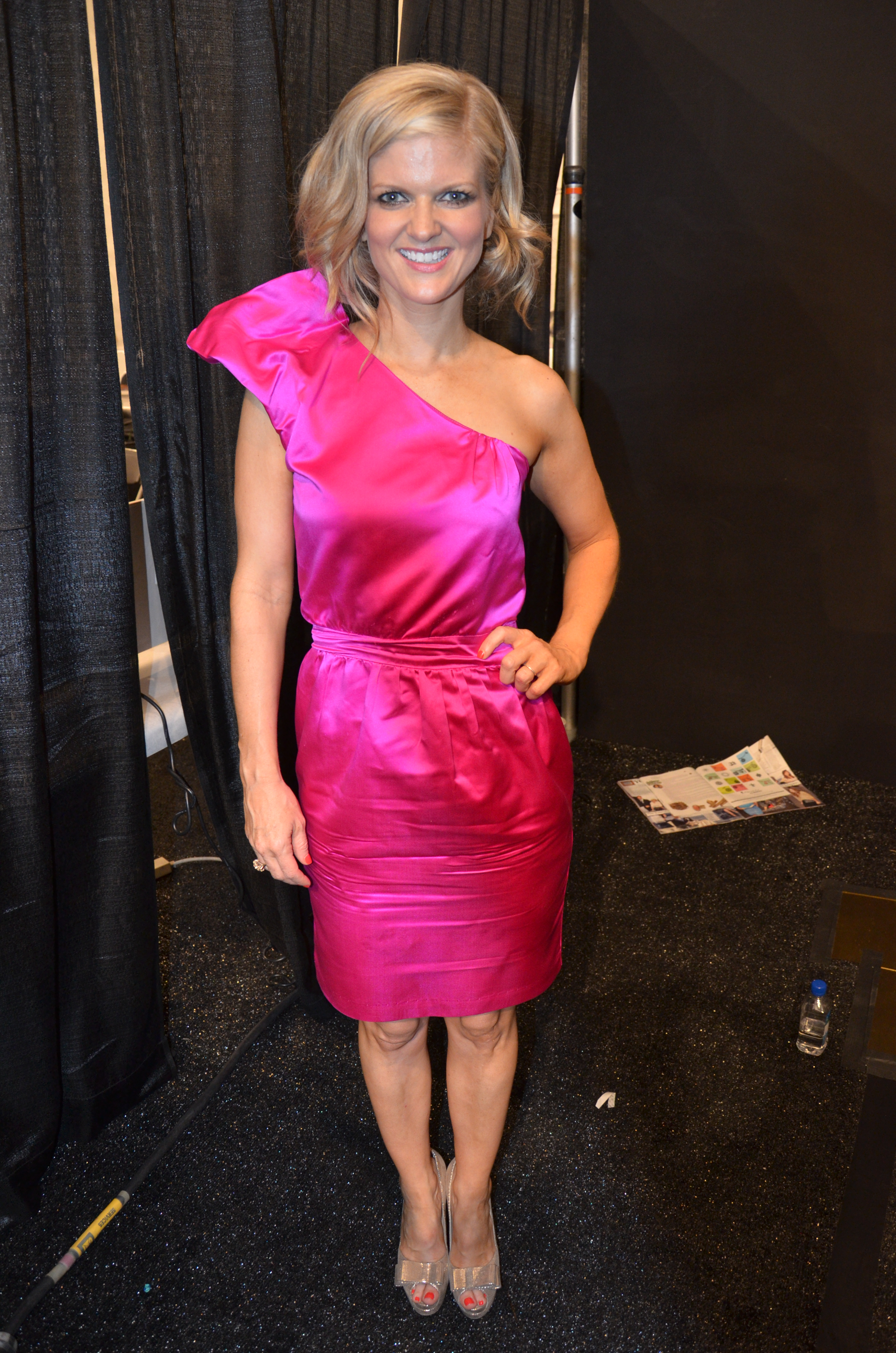
Myrin in 2011

Shortly after graduation, Myrin briefly moved to Chicago, where she became a member of the Improv Olympic and later re-located to New York City and Los Angeles, where she was part of the same group. One of her memorable standup comedian acts included a section of her own life experiences called Straight Outta Lil' Compton. She later wrote a book of such life experiences, called Little Miss Little Compton: A Memoir.

Myrin's television credits include Insatiable, Insecure, Grey's Anatomy, Conan, Orange Is the New Black, Hung, Key & Peele, Inside Amy Schumer, W/ Bob & David, Psych, Bones, Fresh Off the Boat, Suburgatory, 2 Broke Girls, Reno 911!, Shameless, Gilmore Girls, and Secret Chef. She has appeared on Late Night with Conan O'Brien, The Howard Stern Show, WTF with Marc Maron, and RuPaul's Drag Race. Myrin is also the host of the iHeartRadio podcast Will You Accept This Rose? about The Bachelor franchise and in 2022 debuted another iHeartRadio podcast Lady of the Road celebrating female leaders with co-host Bridgerton director Julie Anne Robinson.

Myrin has appeared in many films, including the Quentin Dupieux films Wrong Cops and Wrong, as well as Bachelorette, Kinsey, Morning Glory, and others. As a writer, she has sold pilots to Adult Swim and MTV, along with writing the memoir Little Miss Little Compton. She appeared on Chelsea Lately over 100 times and was a regular panelist on @midnight.

Myrin starred in the 2016 production of Steve Martin's play Meteor Shower at the Long Wharf Theatre. Her other theater credits include Robert O'Hara's Barbecue at The Public Theater in New York City, as well as the premiere of John Ross Bowie's play about The Ramones Four Chords and A Gun at the Bootleg Theater in Los Angeles. Myrin was in the original New York City production of David Mamet's Boston Marriage at the Public Theater, and appeared in Hay Fever directed by Darko Tresnjak at the Westport Country Playhouse.

=== Mad TV ===
Myrin officially joined the cast of Mad TV in 2005 as a repertory performer from season 11 to its last episode on FOX in 2009 (Myrin didn't come back to the show for its revival in 2016).

== Personal life ==
On December 30, 2007, Myrin married Dan Martin, a comedy writer she first met in 2001. On June 1, 2021, Myrin announced she and Martin were divorcing via a post on her Instagram account.

== Filmography ==
=== Film ===
Year	Title	Role	Notes
1997	I Think I Do	Wendy	
1997	Deconstructing Harry	Mary	
1997	In & Out	Student	
1998	The Impostors	Stewardess with luggageas	
1999	30 Days	Stacey	
2000	What Women Want	Darcy's assistant	
2001	Bubble Boy	Lorraine	
2002	Highway	Lucy	
2002	Auto Focus	Hippie girl	
2003	Farm Sluts	Larry's co-worker	
2003	Soul Mates	Julie	
2003	Dry Cycle	Sarah	
2004	Kinsey	Emily	
2004	Whistlin' Dixie	Bunny LeVine	
2004	Christmas with the Kranks	Daisy	
2005	Heart of the Beholder	Patty	
2005	I'm Not Gay	Foreperson	
2007	Evan Almighty	Evan's staffer	
2009	The Informant!	Sarah Scott	
2012	Wrong	Gabrielle	
2013	Wrong Cops	Shirley	
2018	Daphne & Velma	Principal Piper	
2019	I Hate Kids	Janice Bodicker	
2019	Extracurricular Activities	Connie Dawkins	
2019	Satanic Panic	Gypsy Neumieir	
2019	Emmett	Carol Jensen	
2019	Radioflash	Nancy	
2022	Space Oddity	Lisa	
2023	A Snowy Day in Oakland	Shelby	
2023	Onyx the Fortuitous and the Talisman of Souls	Shelley	
2023	Step Aside	Suzzi Saddlersack	
2024	Almost Popular	Terri Reinhard	
2025	The Threesome	Evelyn	
2026	Christmas at the Kringles	Carol Kringle	
2026	Quarter	Diane	Post-production

Key
†	Denotes films that have not yet been released

=== Television ===
Year	Title	Role	Notes
1997–1999	Working	Abby Cosgrove	39 episodes
1999	Just Shoot Me!	Amy	Episode: "Hello Goodbye"
2000	Nikki	Amy	Episode: "The Ex Factor"
2001	Friends	Brenda	Episode: "The One with the Stain"
2003	On the Spot	Caramel	5 episodes
2004	I'm with Her	Girl	Episode: "Eight Simple Rules for Dating a Celebrity"
2004	Reno 911!	Miss Nude Reno 1	Episode: "Dangle's Wife Visits"
2005	Kitchen Confidential	Wendy	2 episodes
2005–2009	Mad TV	Various characters	82 episodes (seasons 11–14)
2006	Gilmore Girls	Claude	Episode: "Bridesmaids Revisited"
2006	Modern Men	Marcy	Episode: "The Breakup"
2007–2008	That's So Hollywood	Herself	2 episodes
2007–2015	Good Day LA	Herself	3 episodes
2008–2014	Chelsea Lately	Herself	110 episodes
2009	True Jackson, VP	Jenna Lutrell	Episode: "Red Carpet"
2009	Royal Pains	Bonnie Day	Episode: "If I Were a Sick Man"
2009	Ruby & the Rockits	Erica	Episode: "Do You Want to Blow a Secret?"
2009	Michael and Michael Have Issues	Various characters	3 episodes
2009	It's On with Alexa Chung	Herself	Regular guest
2010	Party Down	Vanna De Milo	Episode: "James Ellison Funeral"
2011	Hot in Cleveland	Jasmine Breeze	Episode: "Dog Tricks, Sex Flicks & Joy's Fix"
2011	Hung	Joanie	Episode: "Don't Give Up on Detroit or Hung Like a Horse"
2011	RuPaul's Drag Race	Herself (guest judge)	Episode: "Ru Ha Ha"
2011–2012	Suburgatory	Jocelyn	4 episodes
2011, 2013	Psych	Chelsea	2 episodes
2012	Delocated	Marlo	Episode: "Midnight Munchingtons"
2013	Inside Amy Schumer	Mail girl	Episode: "A Porn Star Is Born"
2013	Orange Is the New Black	Dr. Brooks	Episode: "Lesbian Request Denied"
2013	The Soul Man	Danielle	Episode: "Love Thy Neighbor"
2013	Key & Peele	Marcy Whitchurch	Episode: "Black Ice"
2014–2017	@midnight	Herself	17 episodes
2014	Legit	Tess	2 episodes
2014	Anger Management	Paula	Episode: "Charlie Gets Trashed"
2014	Quick Draw	Belle Starr	2 episodes
2015	The Exes	Stacy	Episode: "Get Her to the Greek"
2015	Fresh Off the Boat	Ashley Alexander	3 episodes
2015	Bones	Lori Tucker	Episode: "The Putter in the Rough"
2015	K.C. Undercover	Maggie Summer	Episode: "Enemy of the State"
2015	2 Broke Girls	Jodie	Episode: "And the Gym and Juice"
2016	Hidden America with Jonah Ray	Anne Acton	Episode: "Seattle: Breaking Through the Gray"
2016	Shameless	Dollface Delores	5 episodes
2017	Still the King	Kaitlynn	8 episodes
2018	Corporate	Courtney	Episode: "Remember Day"
2018	Grey's Anatomy	Kirsten	Episode: "All of Me"
2018–2019	Insatiable	Regina Sinclair	Recurring role (season 1); main role (season 2)
2018	Adam Ruins Everything	Cathy Marciola	Episode: "Adam Ruins Sleep"
2019	The Magicians	Helen	Episode: "Marry... Kill"
2019	Teachers	Trish	Episode: "The Final Robe"
2020	The George Lucas Talk Show	Herself	Episode: "A New Hopevember"
2020	The Goldbergs	Donatella Mortifoglio	Episode: "Island Time"
2020	Insecure	Detective Rawlins	3 episodes
2020	Site Unseen	Herself	Episode: #1.8
2021	25 Words or Less	Herself	11 episodes
2023	The Muppets Mayhem	Annie Waits	Episode: "Track 10: We Will Rock You"
2023	The Marvelous Mrs. Maisel	Mrs. Moyers	2 episodes
2023	Secret Chef	Cheffy (voice)	10 episodes
2025	The Righteous Gemstones	Jana Milsap	4 episodes
2025	After Midnight	Herself	Episode: #175
2026	Free Bert	LeeAnne Kreischer	Netflix series
