= Tate Ellington =

American actor (born 1979)

- Born: James Tate Ellington; April 17, 1979 (age 47); Madison, Mississippi, U.S.
- Education: University of Mississippi (BA)
- Occupation: Actor
- Years active: 2004–present
- Spouse: Chrissy Fiorilli (m. 2012)
- Children: 2

James Tate Ellington (born April 17, 1979) is an American actor. He portrayed Aidan Hall, the best friend of Tyler Hawkins (Robert Pattinson) in the 2010 romantic drama film Remember Me.

== Early life and education ==
Ellington is from Madison, Mississippi, the son of Deborah (Cochran) and James R. Ellington, who own a residential construction company. He received his high school education at the private Madison-Ridgeland Academy, in Madison, where he graduated in 1997. In high school, he was a starting center for the school's football team for three seasons.

Ellington enrolled as a double major in art and theater at the University of Mississippi, after turning down a scholarship to the Savannah College of Art and Design. He graduated with a bachelor's degree in theatre performance and is a member of the Sigma Chi fraternity.

== Career ==
Ellington starred as Oliver Hunt in The Elephant King (2006) and has appeared in television shows such as The Unusuals, Rescue Me, The Good Wife, and Don't Trust the B— in Apartment 23. He appeared in the 2009 Broadway production of The Philanthropist, which starred Matthew Broderick. He is best known for his role as FBI recruit Simon Asher on the ABC thriller Quantico. In 2015, Ellington had a brief appearance as a mythology professor in the horror film Sinister 2. Beginning September 25, 2017, Ellington joined the main cast of NBC's new drama The Brave. He played Noah Morgenthau in the military thriller, which was one of the first two new series announced by NBC for the 2017–18 season.

Ellington won Best Actor for his role in The Elephant King at the 2006 Brooklyn International Film Festival.

== Personal life ==
On May 20, 2012, Ellington married casting director Chrissy Fiorilli at the Dixie Gin in Shreveport, Louisiana.

== Filmography ==
Film roles
Year	Title	Role	Notes
2004	Ariana	Karl	Short film
2004	Lower East Side	—N/a	Short film
2005	You Are Alone	Mike	
2006	The Elephant King	Oliver Hunt	
2007	Descent	George	Uncredited
2008	Red	Gun shop clerk	
2009	Breaking Upwards	Brian	
2009	The Invention of Lying	Waiter #2	
2009	Red Hook	Gavin	
2010	Remember Me	Aidan Hall	
2011	Silver Tongues	Alex	
2011	Northeast	Patrick	
2012	The Kitchen	Kenny	
2015	Chronic	Greg	
2015	Straight Outta Compton	Bryan Turner	
2015	Sinister 2	Dr. Stomberg	
2017	The Endless	Hal	
2017	Belzebuth	Ivan Franco	
2018	A Patient Man	Aaron Clarke	
2019	Tone-Deaf	James	
2023	Jess Plus None	Nate	
2023	Maggie Moore(s)	Duane Rich	
2023	Genie	Johnny	

Television roles
Year	Title	Role	Notes
2009	Taking Chance	A.V. Scott	
2009	The Unusuals	Mark Stanwood	Episode: "One Man Band"
2009	Rescue Me	Saul	Episode: "Jump"
2010	The Good Wife	Tim Willens	Episode: "Infamy"
2012	Don't Trust the B— in Apartment 23	Steven	2 episodes
2012	The Glades	Richard Oberman	Episode: "Close Encounters"
2013	Psych	Patrick Hess	Episode: "Juliet Wears the Pantsuit"
2014	NCIS: Los Angeles	Ira Wells	Episode: "Zero Days"
2014	Bad Teacher	Jerry	Episode: "The Bottle"
2014	The Walking Dead	Alex	2 episodes
2014	Castle	Henry Wright	Episode: "Clear & Present Danger"
2014	Parenthood	Griffin	Episode: "The Scale of Affection Is Fluid"
2015	The Mindy Project	Rob Gurglar	4 episodes
2015	The Big Bang Theory	Mitchell	Episode: "The Skywalker Incursion"
2015–2016	Quantico	Simon Asher	Main role, 22 episodes
2016	Shameless	Chad	Recurring role, 6 episodes
2016	Rosewood	Troy	Episode "Secrets and Silent Killers"
2016	The Blacklist	Miles McGrath	Episode "Miles McGrath"
2017–2018	The Brave	Noah Morgenthau	Main role, 13 episodes
2018	Lethal Weapon	Daryl	Episode: "A Game of Chicken"
2018	The Resident	Jason Thoms	Episode: "00:42:30"
2019	The Affair	Dashiell	Episode #5.4
2019	Unbelievable	Stephan Graham	2 episodes
2020	Lincoln Rhyme: Hunt for the Bone Collector	Felix	10 episodes
2021	All Rise	JA Ralph Carson	Episode: "Chasing Waterfalls"
2022	Kenan	David	2 episodes
2022	Law & Order	Colin Baker	Episode: "Severance"
2022	The Rookie: Feds	Jerry Palmer	Episode: "Felicia"
2023	FBI: Most Wanted	Benjamin Piccagli	Episode: "Heaven Falling"
2024–2025	Law & Order: Organized Crime	Professor Kyle Vargas	Recurring role
TBA	Dick Bunny	Wolfie	Episode: "Chapter Six"

Web roles
Year	Title	Role	Notes
2012	Wolfpack of Reseda	Ben March	6 episodes
2014	The Britishes	Max	2 episodes

== Theatre ==
Year	Play	Role	Notes
2009	The Philanthropist	John	American Airlines Theatre; April 26 – June 28, 2009
