= Pasha D. Lychnikoff =

Russian-American actor

- Born: Pavel Dmitriyevich Lychnikov; February 16, 1967 (age 59); Moscow, Russian SFSR, Soviet Union
- Other names: Pavel Lychnikoff; Pasha Lychnikoff
- Occupation: Actor
- Years active: 1996–present

Pavel Dmitriyevich Lychnikov (Russian: Павел Дмитриевич Лычников; born February 16, 1967) is a Russian-American actor, who lives and works in the United States.

== Early life and education ==
Lychnikoff was born in Moscow. His father was a professor at the Plekhanov Moscow Institute of the National Economics and his mother worked as a flight attendant. He later received formal training at the Russian Academy of Theatre Arts (also known as GITIS from 1934 to 1991).

== Career ==
In the early 1990s, Lychnikoff moved to the United States. Since his subsequent move to Los Angeles, he has appeared in many TV movies and series and feature films. He is noted for his roles as the telegraph operator Blazanov in HBO's TV series Deadwood, as Russian mobster Vadim Youchenko in the movie Trade, as an Mi24 Hind Helicopter pilot in Charlie Wilson's War, and as Dima in Battlefield 4. He also appears as Howard Wolowitz's Russian cosmonaut crewmate Dimitri in the TV series The Big Bang Theory.

Lychnikoff has also made several stage appearances in Russia and the U.S. His self-written play The Shelter, which he also directed, was nominated for the Californian Ovation Award in five categories, and Lychnikoff's performance in it received positive reviews from a number of critics.

== Filmography ==
=== Film ===
Year	Title	Role	Notes
1992	Yad skorpiona		
1997	Crash Dive	Newton	(video)
1997	Air Force One	Russian Prison Guard #1	
1997	Playing God	Andrei	
1998	Skip Chasers		
2000	Bob, Verushka & the Pursuit of Happiness	Illya	
2005	Fun with Dick and Jane	Andrei / Load Boxer	Uncredited
2006	Miami Vice	Russian FBI Agent	
2007	Trade	Vadim Youchenko	
2007	A Thousand Years of Good Prayers	Boris	
2007	Charlie Wilson's War	Russian Helicopter Pilot #1	
2008	Reservations	Tomas	
2008	Cloverfield	Russian Man on Street	
2008	Indiana Jones and the Kingdom of the Crystal Skull	Russian Soldier Roosevelt	
2008	Mia and the Migoo	Staravitch	English version, voice
2009	The Perfect Sleep	Vassily	
2009	Star Trek	Romulan Commander	
2010	Grace Bedell	David Mann	Short
2010	Valley of the Sun	K.K.	
2011	Bucky Larson: Born to Be a Star	Dimitri / Distributor	
2012	Chernobyl Diaries	Doctor	
2013	A Good Day to Die Hard	Cabbie	
2014	Rage	Chernov	
2015	Rodina	Kosmos	
2016	Beyond Valkyrie: Dawn of the 4th Reich	Major Aleksandr Kulkov	
2018	Siberia	Boris Volkov	
2020	No Escape	Andrei	
2020	Last Moment of Clarity	Karl	
2022	Bullet Train	Alexei Ilyin	
2025	Mission: Impossible – The Final Reckoning	Captain Koltsov	

=== Television ===
Year	Title	Role	Notes
1996	NYPD Blue	Dimitri	Episode: "Burnin' Love"
1997	Dark Skies	Josef	Episode: "White Rabbit"
1997	Michael Hayes	Dubov	Episode: "Death and Taxes"
1997	C-16: FBI	Cyril	Episode: "Russian Winter"
1998	Brooklyn South	Dimitri Gort	Episode: "Fools Russian"
1998	Beyond Belief: Fact or Fiction		Episode: "A Touch of Evil"
1998	Bad Cop, Bad Cop		TV movie
1999	Nash Bridges	Vladimir Yodka	Episode: "Power Play"
2000	NYPD Blue	John Shenkov	Episode: "Everybody Plays the Mule"
2000	Buffy the Vampire Slayer	Monk	Episode: "No Place Like Home"
2001	Big Apple	Mitya	6 episodes
2002	The Agency	Russian Mob Boss	Episode: "The Understudy"
2002	Alias	Zoran Sokolov	Episode: "Passage: Part 1"
2002	Without a Trace	Prisoner	2 episodes
2003	CSI: Miami	Victor Ratsch	Episode: "Evidence of Things Unseen"
2003	She Spies	Bar Manager	Episode: "Crossed Out"
2003	Threat Matrix	Konstantin Noskeno	Episode: "Cold Cash"
2003	10-8: Officers on Duty	Raymond Castoff	Episode: "Lucy in the Sky"
2003	The Flannerys		TV movie
2005–2006	Deadwood	Blazanov	16 episodes
2006	The Shield	Mikula Popovich	Episode: "Trophy"
2007	CSI: NY	Yuri Sokov	Episode: "Past Imperfect"
2008	Chuck	Viktor Federov	Episode: "Chuck Versus the Undercover Lover"
2008	My Own Worst Enemy	Nikolai Yelnikov	Episode: "The Night Train to Moscow"
2009	Leverage	Head Goon	Episode: "The Ice Man Job"
2009	Lie to Me	Jones	Episode: "Grievous Bodily Harm"
2010	Law & Order: Special Victims Unit	Mr. Brooks / Anton Petrov	Episode: "Ace"
2010	The Defenders	Mr. Nicolec (Jewelry Store Owner)	Episode: "Las Vegas v. Reid"
2010	Undercovers	Warner Kaminsky	2 episodes
2010	The Odds		TV movie
2011	The Cape	Russian Commander	Episode: "Kozmo"
2011	CHAOS	Alexei Dratchev	Episode: "Love and Rockets"
2012	Bent	Vlad	6 episodes
2012	The Big Bang Theory	Dimitri Rezinov	5 episodes
2012	Eagleheart	Holst	Episode: "Exit Wound the Gift Shop"
2013	New Girl	Buyer 1	Episode: "A Father's Love"
2013	NCIS: Los Angeles	Michael Zirov	Episode: "Descent"
2013	Childrens Hospital	Bad Guy #1	Episode: "Blaken"
2014	Gang Related	Slotko Yegenev	2 episodes
2014	The Blacklist	Berlin's Assistant	Episode: "Monarch Douglas Bank (No. 112)"
2015	Allegiance	Vaso Matiashvilli	2 episodes
2016	Ray Donovan	Ivan Belikov	3 episodes
2016	Elementary	Ruslan Krasnov	Episode: "The Invisible Hand"
2016	Shameless	Yvon	5 episodes
2016	Fizruk	Misha Buddhist	Main cast
2017	The Brave	Ivan Sokolov	Episode: "The Seville Defection"
2018	MacGyver	Boris	Episode: "Hammock + Balcony"
2018	Insomnia	Koval	8 episodes
2018	Six	Anzor	Episode: "FUBAR"
2019	Good Girls	Nico	2 episodes
2022	FBI: International	Paul Kovács	Episode: "Left of Boom"
2022	S.W.A.T.	Maxim	Episode: "Zodiac"
2022	Stranger Things	Oleg	3 episodes
2022	Law & Order: Organized Crime	Daniel Rublev	Episode: "Gimme Shelter – Part One"
2022	Law & Order	Daniel Rublev	Episode: "Gimme Shelter – Part Three"
2022	Bosch: Legacy	Baba	Episode: "Chain of Authenticity"
2023	True Lies	Grozdan	Episode: "Public Secrets"
2023	Average Joe	Nicolai Dzhugashvili	Main Cast
2025	Countdown	Iosif Astapov	4 episodes

=== Video and computer games ===
Year	Title	Role
2003	Medal of Honor: Allied Assault - Spearhead	Additional voices
2003	Freedom Fighters	Additional voices
2005	Medal of Honor: European Assault	Cherryenko/additional voices
2006	SOCOM U.S. Navy SEALs: Combined Assault	Additional voice over talent
2008	Dark Sector	Soldier/Civilian
2008	Command & Conquer: Red Alert 3	Additional voices
2007	Tom Clancy's Endwar	Additional voices
2010	Singularity	Additional voices
2012	Warhammer Online: Wrath of Heroes	Drulg
2012	Tom Clancy's Ghost Recon: Future Soldier	Russian Infantry
2012	Call of Duty: Black Ops II	Additional voices
2013	Metro: Last Light	Additional voices
2013	Battlefield 4	Dimitri "Dima" Mayakovsky
2016	Call of Duty: Infinite Warfare	Additional voices
2019	Metro Exodus	Bridge Dweller, Child of the Forest, Tribal, Bandit
2020	Call of Duty: Black Ops Cold War	Maxim Antonov (Model Actor)
