= Peter Macon =

American actor

- Macon at Dragon Con 2025 in Atlanta, GA
- Born: Peter Jerrod Macon; May 18, 1982 (age 44); Cincinnati, Ohio, U.S.
- Education: North Community High School; Yale School of Drama; San Francisco Art Institute
- Occupation: Actor
- Years active: 1994–present
- Spouse: Lucia Brawley (m. 2005; div. 2010) Jacquelyn Woods (m. 2018)

Peter Jerrod Macon (born May 18, 1982) is an American actor. He is best known for his roles as Lt. Commander Bortus in the Fox/Hulu television series The Orville (2017–2022), and Raka in Kingdom of the Planet of the Apes (2024).

== Early life ==
Macon was raised in Minneapolis and attended North Community High School, where he acted in school plays. His mother was a teacher, and his father was a truck driver.

Macon later attended the San Francisco Art Institute and the Yale School of Drama, where he earned a master's degree in acting.

Macon married Lucia Brawley, an actress who also attended Yale, in 2005. Former New York City mayor David Dinkins officiated. They filed for divorce in 2009 and it was finalized in Los Angeles in March 2010. In 2018, Macon married Jacquelyn Woods.

== Career ==
=== Stage theater ===
Macon acted for nearly 30 years at Twin Cities theaters including Penumbra, Illusion, and Children's Theatre Company, and he starred in the title role of Othello at the Guthrie Theater, as well as productions of the play in Dublin, Colorado, and Oregon.

=== Television ===
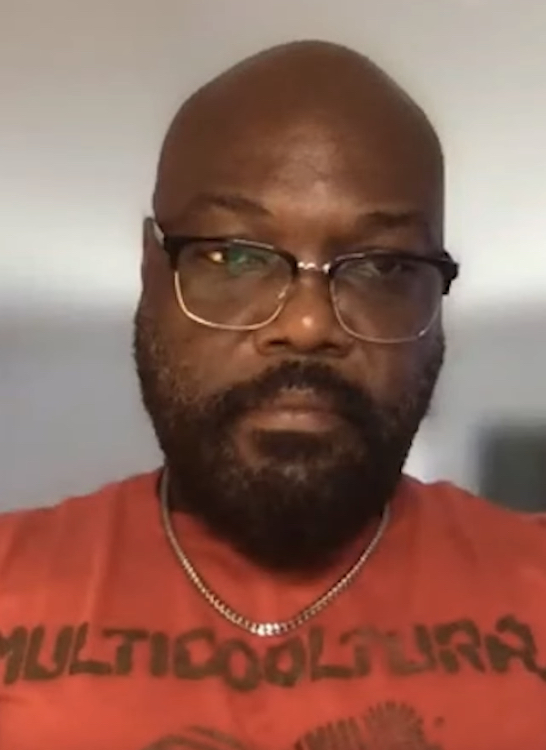
Macon in 2022

Macon has appeared in episodes of Nash Bridges, Law & Order, Without a Trace, Supernatural, The Shield, Dexter, Bosch, SEAL Team, and Shameless.

In 2017, Macon began playing Bortus in The Orville, a comedy-drama science fiction television series created by Seth MacFarlane that premiered on FOX on September 10 of that year. In 2021, Macon joined the voice cast of MacFarlane's animated series Family Guy, providing the voice of recurring character Preston Lloyd.

=== Film ===
Macon has starred in a selection of films and is best-known for his role as Raka in Kingdom of the Planet of the Apes. In an interview with Hollywood.com in 2024, he described how he prepared for the role by attending "Ape School". He also spoke about how he feels relief of not being recognised for the role due to his character being animated based on his motion.

== Filmography ==
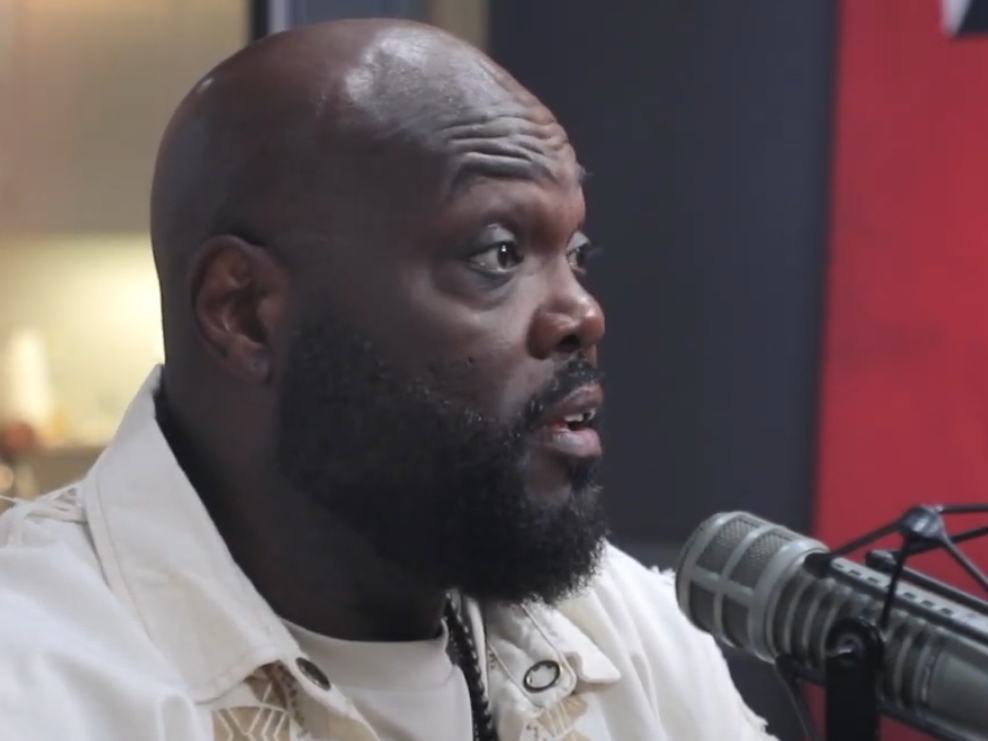
Macon in 2024

=== Film ===
Year	Title	Role	Notes
1994	World and Time Enough	Mike	
2008	Turok: Son of Stone	Tower Sentry (voice)	Direct-to-video
2023	Shelter in Solitude	Jackson Marcus	
2024	Kingdom of the Planet of the Apes	Raka	
TBA	Ally Clark		Post-production

=== Television ===
Year	Title	Role	Notes
1997, 1999	Nash Bridges	Staple, Weldon Howard	2 episodes
2002	Animated Tales of the World	Narrator	Episode: "John Henry, the Steel Driving Man"
2004	Law & Order	Cop	Episode: "Gov Love"
2004	Without a Trace	Cop #2	Episode: "Doppelgänger: Part 2"
2007	Supernatural	Isaac	Episode: "The Magnificent Seven"
2007	Dexter	Leonis	Episode: "Resistance Is Futile"
2014	How to Get Away with Murder	David Allen	Episode: "Freakin' Whack-a-Mole"
2015–16	Bosch	Reverend Isiah Ott	3 episodes
2016	Shameless	Luther Winslow	Recurring role
2016	NCIS	ICE Agent Todd Baldwin	Episode: "Home of the Brave"
2017–2022	The Orville	Lt. Commander Bortus	Main role; 36 episodes
2019	SEAL Team	Master Chief Wilke	Episode: "Time to Shine"
2021–present	Family Guy	Preston Lloyd (voice)	Recurring role
2026	Ted	Mr. Lawrence	Episode: "Talk Dirty to Me"
2026	Cape Fear	Warren “Smiley” Pitt	Episode: “Pierced”
2027	Scooby-Doo: Origins	TBA	Filming

=== Video games ===
Year	Title	Role	Notes
1996	Twisted Metal 2	Axel, Minion	
1997	Cool Boarders 2	Boss	
2017	Wolfenstein II: The New Colossus	Bombate	
2019	Anthem	Commander Vule	

== Awards ==
In 2002, Macon won a Primetime Emmy Award for Outstanding Voice-Over Performance for narrating the episode "John Henry, the Steel Driving Man" of the television series Animated Tales of the World.
