= Jaylen Barron =

American actress (born 1997)

- Born: August 31, 1997 (age 28); Reno, Nevada, U.S.
- Occupation: Actress
- Years active: 2012–present
- Television: Shameless; Free Rein; Blindspotting

Jaylen Barron (born August 31, 1997) is an American actress, known for her roles as Dominique Winslow in the Showtime series Shameless and Zoe Phillips in the Netflix drama series Free Rein. In 2021, she began starring in the Starz series Blindspotting.

== Early life ==
Barron was born on August 31, 1997, in Reno, Nevada. Barron and her family later relocated to Los Angeles, where she began acting. Barron's mother is of Mexican heritage, while her father is African American.

== Career ==
Barron made her television debut in 2012, appearing in Bones and Shake It Up. She then went on to have recurring roles in See Dad Run, Good Luck Charlie and Shameless. When asked about her time on Shameless, she commented: "It was one of the best experiences. The people were amazing and talented. I learned so much and I carry the fast-paced style of acting throughout my career." In 2017, Barron was cast in the role of Zoe Phillips in the Netflix original drama series Free Rein. She has starred in all three seasons of the series, as well as appearing in two feature-length Free Rein films. In January 2021, Barron appeared in an episode of the Fox series 9-1-1. Later in 2021, she starred in the Starz series Blindspotting, a television adaptation of the 2018 film of the same name.

== Filmography ==
Year	Title	Role	Notes
2012	Bones	Ashley Otton	Episode: "The Bump in the Road"
2012	Shake It Up	Melanie	Episode: "Protest It Up"
2012–2013	See Dad Run	Mary	8 episodes
2013–2014	Good Luck Charlie	Lauren Dabney	5 episodes
2016	Shameless	Dominique Winslow	Recurring role
2016, 2019	Those Who Can't	Tina	2 episodes
2017	Explosion Jones	Jenny Jones	1 episode
2017–2019	Free Rein	Zoe Phillips	Main role
2018	Noches con Platanito	Herself	Guest; 1 episode
2018	Free Rein: The 12 Neighs of Christmas	Zoe Phillips	Netflix film
2019	Free Rein: Valentine's Day	Zoe Phillips	Netflix film
2019	Twelve Forever	Esther (voice)	Main role
2021	9-1-1	Katie	Episode: "Alone Together"
2021–2023	Blindspotting	Trish	Main role
2024	Aaron Hernandez: American Sports Story	Shayanna Jenkins	Main role
