= Shanola Hampton =

American actress (born 1977)

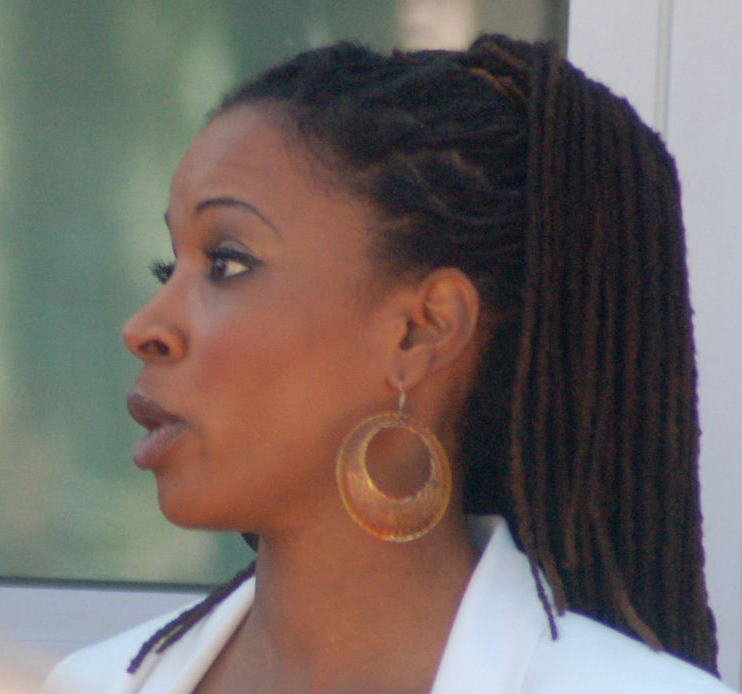
- Hampton in March 2012
- Born: May 27, 1977 (age 49); Long Island, New York, U.S.
- Education: Winthrop University (BA); University of Illinois at Urbana–Champaign (MFA)
- Occupation: Actress
- Years active: 2000–present
- Spouse: Daren Dukes (m. 2000)
- Children: 2
- Awards: Grand Jury Prize for Best Actress, 2013 American Black Film Festival

Shanola Hampton (born May 27, 1977) is an American actress. She is best known for her role as Veronica Fisher on Showtime dramedy Shameless, Gabi Mosely in the NBC drama series Found, and as the face model of Rochelle in the video game Left 4 Dead 2.

== Early life & education ==
Hampton was born on Long Island, New York, where she lived until the age of four, then raised in Summerville, South Carolina. Hampton attended Summerville High School. She graduated from Winthrop University with a degree in theater. While attending Winthrop, Hampton was initiated as a member into the Mu Xi chapter of Alpha Kappa Alpha. While studying acting at the University of Illinois at Urbana–Champaign, Hampton worked at Goose Island Brewery in Wrigleyville. Hampton earned a Masters of Fine Arts in acting.

== Acting career ==
=== 2000–2010: Early career ===
Hampton played a part in "The Gift", a musical at Tiffany Theater in Hollywood in 2000.

Hampton appeared in several television series, such as Shameless, Reba, Popular, Scrubs, Criminal Minds, Related, and Miami Medical. She has also had roles in the movies: The Mostly Unfabulous Social Life of Ethan Green, The Hanged Man, Christmas in the City, and You Again.

She was the face model for Rochelle in the video game Left 4 Dead 2.

=== 2011–present ===
In Summer 2010, Hampton was cast as a series regular on the Showtime dramedy Shameless as Veronica Fisher, a role for which she has received critical acclaim.

In 2013, Hampton co-starred in the movie Things Never Said. Hampton played a woman who tries to find the strength to leave her physically abusive husband. The movie was part of the Annual American Black Film Festival, the North Carolina Black Film Festival, Roxbury International Film Festival, the Greater Cleveland Urban Film Festival, the Black Star Film Festival, and the Laguna Film Festival. She signed a deal with NBCUniversal via Universal Television more recently.

Hampton starred in the NBC television series Found, and also served as a producer.

== Personal life ==
Hampton has been married to Daren Dukes since March 2000. The couple has a daughter named Cai MyAnna Dukes (born January 2014) and a son named Daren O.C. Dukes (born May 2016).

== Filmography ==
=== Film ===
Year	Title	Role	Notes
2002	Love and basketball	Sarah	Short film
2004	Girls' Lunch		Short film
2005	The Mostly Unfabulous Social Life of Ethan Green	Charlotte	
2007	The Hanged Man	X-Factor	
2010	You Again	Tammy	
2012	Hot and Bothered	Alex	Short film
2013	They Die by Dawn	Pretty Woman	Short film
2013	Things Never Said	Kalindra Stepney	
2014	Suburban Gothic	Ticona	
2014	Ricky Robot Arms	Alexia	Short film
2015	Worthy	Kyra	
2015	Forever	Laura	
2015	The Audition	Shanola Hampton	Video short
2018	Do No Harm	Gunnery Sergeant Witte	Short film
2019	#Truth	Katrina Little	
2019	American Bullet		announced
2020	Through the Glass Darkly	Amy	
2021	Deadly Illusions	Elaine Fuller	Also producer

=== Television ===
Year	Title	Role	Notes
2001	Electra Woman and Dyna Girl	Daisy	
2001	Reba	Marci	Episode: "The Steaks Are High"
2001	Popular	Girl #1	Episode: "Fag"
2002	Strong Medicine	Tracy Saunders	Episode: "Family Stories"
2004	Scrubs	Woman	Episode: "My Best Moment"
2005–2006	Related	Flash	4 episodes
2006	Pepper Dennis	Darcine	Episode: "True Love Is Dead"
2010	Miami Medical	Dr. Graceffa	6 episodes
2011–2021	Shameless	Veronica Fisher	134 episodes Main cast (Season 1–11); Directed S11 E08
2012	Criminal Minds	Cindi Burns	Episode: "The Company"
2013	Christmas in the City	Angie	Television film
2014	Hell's Kitchen	Herself	Season 12 Episode 20: "Winner Chosen"
2014–2018	Noches con Platanito	Herself	2 episodes
2015	Stalker	Pam Tyler	Episodes: "Love Hurts" and "Love Kills"
2018	Good Mythical Morning		Episode: "Name That Pet Shame"
2019	Three's Complicated	Deja	Television film; Also executive producer
2020	The Eric Andre Show	Herself	Episode: "Hannibal Quits"
2022	The Neighborhood	Nicki	Episode: "Welcome to the Dream Girls"
2023–2025	Found	Gabrielle "Gabi" Mosely	Lead role; Also, producer

=== Video games ===
Year	Title	Role	Notes
2009	Left 4 Dead 2	Rochelle	Face model

== Awards and nominations ==
Year	Award	Category	Nominated work	Result
2013	American Black Film Festival	Best actor	Things Never Said	Won
