= Ash (name) =

- Pronunciation: /ˈæʃ/
- Gender: Unisex
- Language: English

Origin
- Language: Old English
- Region of origin: England

Ash is both a given name and a surname. It may be a shortened version of Ashton, Ashley, Asher, and Ashlyn. The name is gender neutral.

Notable people and fictional characters with the name include:

== Given name ==
=== People ===
- Ash Ambihaipahar, Australian politician
- Ash Amin (born 1955), British geographer
- Ash Atalla (born 1972), British television producer
- Ash Baron-Cohen (born 1967), British film director, usually credited as "Ash"
- Ashleigh Barty (born 1996), Australian tennis player
- Ash Bowie (born c. 1968), American indie musician
- Ash Carter (1954–2022), American physicist, professor, and former U.S. Secretary of Defense
- Ash Gordon, American singer-songwriter
- Ash Holme (born 1996), English media personality
- Ash London, Australian radio and television personality
- Ash Palmisciano (born 1990), English actor
- Ash Pollard (born 1986), Australian cook, author, television and radio personality
- Ash Regan (born 1974), Scottish politician

=== Fictional characters ===
- Ash, the protagonist of fantasy novel Ash: A Secret History
- Ash (Alien), an android in the 1979 science fiction horror film Alien
- Ash (Avalon), the main protagonist in the 2001 science fiction film Avalon
- Ash (Echo), a character portrayed by Tasya Teles in the TV series The 100
- Ash, a character in the manga and anime series MÄR
- Ash, a character in the animated films Sing and Sing 2
- Ash (Ninjago), a character in Ninjago
- Ash, a character who is Marceline the Vampire Queen's ex-boyfriend in the animated series Adventure Time
- Ash (Supernatural), a recurring character on the TV series Supernatural
- Ash, a character in the Titanfall series
- Ash Crimson, one of the protagonists of the King of Fighters video game series
- Ash Dove, a recurring character in the TV series H_{2}O: Just Add Water
- Ash Fox, the son of Mr. Fox in the animated film Fantastic Mr. Fox
- Ash, a fictional ostrich from the animated film Night of the Zoopocalypse
- Ash Kaur, a character from EastEnders
- Ash Ketchum, the original main protagonist of Pokémon the Series
- Ash Lynx, the main character of the manga and anime series Banana Fish
- Ash Tyler, the chief of security of the USS Discovery in the TV series Star Trek: Discovery
- Ash Williams, the hero of the Evil Dead film series
- Ash Graven, supporting protagonist in the animated sci-fi series Final Space
- Ash, an epic brawler from mobile game Brawl Stars
- Ash, the protagonist of the 2017 video game The End is Nigh
- Ash Firin, a recurring character in the adult animated TV series Superjail!.

== Surname ==
=== People ===
- Abraham Joseph Ash (c. 1813–1888), American rabbi
- Aesha Ash (born 1977), American ballet dancer
- Bill Ash (1917–2014), Canadian-American fighter pilot
- Brandon Ash (born 1977), American racing driver
- Brian Ash (born 1974), American screenwriter
- Brian Ash (bibliographer) (1936–2010), bibliographer
- Daniel Ash (born 1957), British guitarist
- Ed Ash, American car engine constructor
- Eileen Ash (1911–2021), English cricketer
- Erica Ash (1977–2024), American actress
- Eric Ash (1928–2021), British electrical engineer and former Rector of Imperial College
- George Ash (1859–1897), a South Australian newspaper editor, lawyer, and parliamentarian
- Gerald Ash, electrical engineer
- Gord Ash (born 1951), Canadian baseball manager
- Haruhiko Ash, Japanese rock singer
- Isaac Colton Ash (1861–1933), American banker, real-estate dealer, and politician
- John Ash (disambiguation), several people
- Ken Ash (1901–1979) American baseball pitcher
- Kevin Ash (1959–2013), British motorcycle journalist and writer
- Lauren Ash (born 1983), Canadian actress and comedian
- Leslie Ash (born 1960), British actress
- Marvin Ash (1914–1974), pseudonym of the American jazz pianist Marvin Ashbaugh
- Mary Kay Ash (1918–2001), American businesswoman
- Meir Eisenstadt (1670–1744), rabbi and author also known as Meir Ash
- Meir Eisenstaedter (1780–1852), rabbi, Talmudist, and paytan (liturgic poet) also known as Meir Ash
- Rob Ash (born 1951), American football coach
- Russell Ash (1946–2010), British writer
- Sam Ash, born Samuel Ashkynase (1897–1956), American businessman
- Sam Ash (actor) (1884–1951), American vaudeville singer and film actor
- Timothy Garton Ash (born 1955), British academic historian and writer
- Victor Ash (disambiguation), several people
- William H. Ash (1859–1908), African-American politician and former slave

=== Fictional characters ===
- Ash, one of the main characters from the film Sing
- Captain Ash, a recurring character in the video game series TimeSplitters
- Nina Ash, a character in the TV series Angel
- Randolph Henry Ash, a Victorian poet in the novel Possession: A Romance by A. S. Byatt
- Ash, a virtuous chimpanzee and son of Rocket, on Dawn of the Planet of the Apes.

== See also ==
- Oisc of Kent (pronounced “Ash”) (died 512), semi-legendary king of Kent
- Asch (surname)
- Ash (disambiguation)
- Ashe (disambiguation)
- Ashe (name)
