= Catalyst (Apex Legends) =

Apex Legends character

- Apex Legends character
- Catalyst in Apex Legends
- First appearance: Apex Legends season 15 (2022)
- Created by: Ashley Reed
- Designed by: Mirim Lee
- Voiced by: Meli Grant

In-universe information
- Class: Controller
- Home: Boreas

Catalyst, real name Tressa Crystal Smith, is a character in the 2019 video game Apex Legends. First introduced in its fifteenth season in 2022, she is a transgender woman, described as a "techno-witch" who utilizes a substance called ferrofluid that lets her create defensive barriers to use in battle. She was created by lead writer Ashley Reed who worked closely with transgender members of Respawn Entertainment, the game's developer, and the LGBTQ organization GLAAD in order to ensure that she was done well. She is the first trans character in Apex Legends, and one of the first to appear in a mainstream multiplayer game.

Due to previous misconstruing or denial of the identities of LGBTQ characters in Apex Legends, she was written to be explicitly transgender, though the writers state that they made efforts to avoid her being defined only by her identity. She was portrayed by Meli Grant, a trans woman, who expressed excitement over the role after seeing that they were seeking a trans female actress.

She has been generally well received, with her announcement generating a lot of excitement on social media. She received praise for her design as well as the authenticity of her character, with author Jackson McLaren considering her among the best-executed trans characters in video games. Her potential in the game's metagame has also been discussed, identified as a particularly strong character prior to the game's nineteenth season.

== Appearances ==
In the 2019 video game Apex Legends, players control different characters called "Legends" who participate in a death game competition called the "Apex Games". Apex Legends is split up in segments called "seasons", which typically introduces updates to change how certain Legends perform, and sometimes adds new content, like Legends and maps. She was introduced in 2022 in the game's fifteenth season. According to the game's lore, she grew up on the planet Boreas and later moving to the planet's moon, Cleo, where she applied to become a terraformer. On Cleo, she learns how to control a substance called ferrofluid, which she could use to create barriers to protect herself and others. After losing her job, she joins the Apex Games to make money to support herself and her family. Throughout the game's updates, she received multiple alternate skins.

== Concept and creation ==
When designing Apex Legends characters, the staff at Respawn Entertainment state that the game's world takes place in the future of the real world, and thus, should reflect the experiences of real people, including the development team's. The creation process usually involves starting with the writers, designers, and artists to determine what "kits" the character uses and what personalities match said kits. They also take into account having a diverse cast and looking at what "experiences and identities" they want to include. Catalyst is a transgender woman who goes by the moniker "techno-witch", described by lead writer Ashley Reed as a "big sister type" who looks out for people close too her and "introverted and goth-y". Catalyst is a defensive-oriented character, and the first transgender character added to Apex Legends, as well as one of the first added to a commercial multiplayer game like Apex Legends. Her character art utilizes the colors from the transgender flag, and she speaks openly of her identity, with one quote being "I am the grim trans witch your parents warned you about". She was created by Reed, and designed by Mirim Lee. Lee asked for more information about Catalyst for the design process; Reed gave her dialogue, a personality description, and a music playlist, the latter being an idea conceived by concept artist Brett Marting. They consulted transgender women in their staff as well as GLAAD. One of these consultants was senior game designer Samanta Kalman, who coined Catalyst's description as a "techno-witch", an identifier which served as a "lightning bolt that got the whole team excited". Kalman sought to become involved in creating characters despite not being on the character development team.

Prior to Catalyst's conception, the team had been attempting to create a trans female character. Reed attributed the inclusion of "true-to-life references", such as the inclusion of a meme popular in the transgender community, without assistance from her colleagues and her voice actress. She stated that, when writing these lines, they were conscious of the fact that some players ignored, downplayed, or denied the identity of LGBTQ characters in Apex Legends before, and thus wanted to be more overt. They also sought to avoid making her story be about her transition, choosing to have her have already transitioned due to the belief that transition stories are common enough. Blair Durkee, associate director of gaming at GLAAD, commented that a lot of media featuring transgender people have "horrible transphobic tropes" and feel formulaic; she said that where a lot of depictions have a "singular disclosure moment" as a "shock reveal", Catalyst is "out and proud". When creating the trailer that introduces Catalyst, her identity as a trans woman was explicitly stated in order to avoid any confusion, particularly due to the lack of a narrative in Apex Legends' gameplay. The team worried about conveying her identity both quickly and adequately.

Catalyst was voiced by trans actress Meli Grant, who had been "obsessed" to land the role after hearing that they were seeking to cast a trans actress. Both Grant and Kalman expressed concern over being too subtle or not subtle enough, with Kalman stating that, while "it can’t be another story about the same tropes", not being focused on might make it "invisible". Grant stated that there needed to be more to her than being transgender, and that it's better to represent people through "the mundane" rather than "focusing on the flashpoint of transition". Grant describes Catalyst as "snarky and sardonic", stating that a lot of trans people have this personality as a defense mechanism to transphobia, which connected her to Catalyst.

Catalyst is a Controller type character, using her control over ferrofluid in various ways, which manifest in multiple abilities, including Piercing Spikes, which lets her throw spiky ferrofluid patches which activate when someone enters their proximity; Barricade, which lets her reinforce doors or fill a door frame; and Dark Veil, which creates a creates a wall of ferrofluid that slows and blinds enemies who walk through it.

== Reception ==
The reveal that Catalyst was transgender was the subject of "fairly unanimous excitement" and applause for expanding the diversity of Apex Legends' roster according to Pink News writer Amelia Hansford. She stated that the reveal was met with some transphobia, claiming that her inclusion meant that the game had gone "woke". Gayming Magazine staff nominated Catalyst for the best LGBTQ character of 2023, noting several aspects of her design, including GLAAD's involvement in her creation and the casting of a trans woman in the role. The Loadout writer Natalie Raine praised developer Respawn Entertainment for their handling of Catalyst, stating that she was created "with love". She stated that she felt "seen" with the reveal of Catalyst, calling her a "big step forward" with respect to playable trans characters in video games. She also praised how she was designed, particularly her "goth witch aesthetic, almost-magical abilities, and amazing voice direction", commending them for casting a trans woman in the role. She believed that the strong reaction to Catalyst was a show of how rare well-designed trans characters are.

In an analysis of eight transgender characters in video games, author Jackson McLaren came to the conclusion that Catalyst was among the most meaningful of them. He stated that a lot of the positive reception on Catalyst discussed that she was played by a trans woman, and felt that the heightened presence of Catalyst in the game "force[d] the player to reckon with [her] existence" and offered increased visibility of trans people to cis people. Contrasting with other characters, like Hainly from Mass Effect: Andromeda, McLaren felt that, where Hainly coming out to the player and stating her deadname immediately after meeting felt inappropriate due to her being a minor character, Catalyst's dialogue felt like she was talking about her experience as a trans woman as a "relevant part of [her] trans experience" and that some of her dialogue felt like an in-joke between trans people.

GameSpot writer Jordan Ramée felt that, while Catalyst would not "shake up the meta", she was a type of defender character that he wanted to see more of in Apex Legends. He called her a "reactive defender", comparing her to Apex Legends characters Gibraltar and Newcastle, and stated that she seemed like she may be easier and thus more enjoyable for newcomers or less skilled players. In a later article, Ramée stated that, while it may be recency bias, he loved Catalyst and considered her his favorite new character added in the game's fourth year. He felt that she redefined certain aspects of the game's gameplay, such as how doors work with her Barricade ability. GamesRadar+ writer Alyssa Mercante felt that she had the potential to affect the metagame of Apex Legends, stating that people who enjoy mid to long-range combat or who "prefer to lock down areas and limit where [a player] can attack from" may come to find her their favorite legend in the game. Prior to the nineteenth season, Catalyst, alongside fellow Legend Bangalore, were the center of Apex Legends' metagame. According to designer John Larson, her popularity in competitive play was due to how versatile she was. The nineteenth season introduced changes intended to make her less dominant.
