= Aisling (name) =

Irish language feminine given name meaning "dream" or "vision"

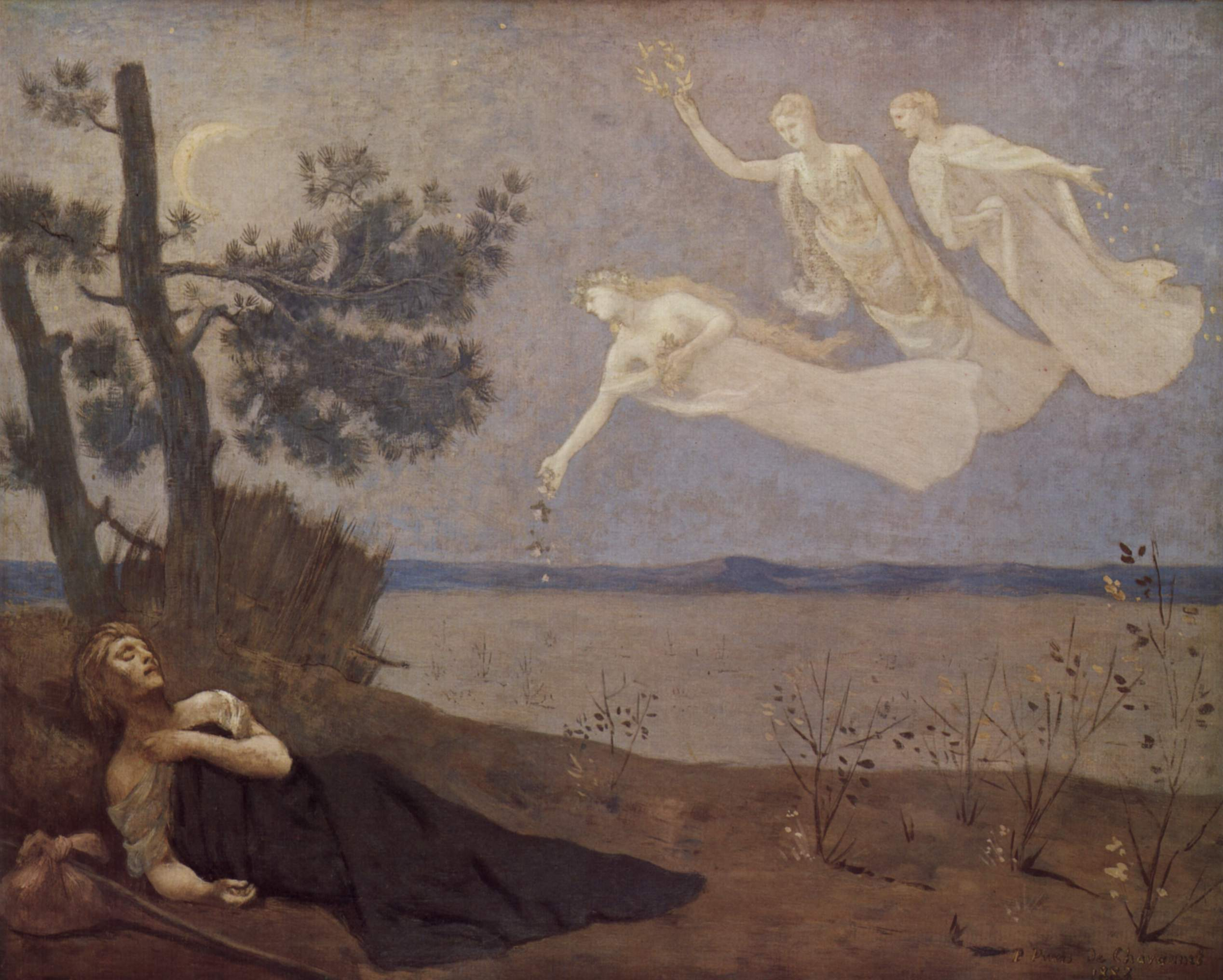
- An 1883 painting by Pierre Puvis de Chavannes depicting an aisling
- Pronunciation: [ˈaʃl̠ʲəɲ]
- Gender: Feminine
- Language: Irish

Origin
- Meaning: 'dream' or 'vision'

Other names
- Short form: Ash

Aisling is an Irish language feminine given name meaning "dream" or "vision". It refers to an aisling, a poetic genre that developed in Irish poetry during the 17th and 18th centuries. There is no evidence that it was used as a given name before the 20th century. The name is included in Reverend Patrick Woulfe's 1923 collection of Irish names, with the comment that the name was in use in Derry and Omeath.

There are many variant anglicised forms of the name including Ashling, Aislin, Aislinn, Aislene, Ashlyn, and Ashlynn. Pronunciation of the name also varies, with the most common pronunciation being /ˈæʃlɪŋ/ ASH-ling; other forms acceptable to Irish speakers are /ˈæʃlɪn/ ASH-lin and /ˈæʃliːn/ ASH-leen. Others, such as /ˈeɪzlɪŋ/ AYZ-ling, /ˈæslɪŋ/ ASS-ling, and /ˈeɪslɪŋ/ AYSS-ling, do not follow the Irish pronunciation.

Aisling held steady in the top 20 girls' names in Ireland from 1984 to 1996 and is therefore often linked with the millennial generation in Ireland, most notably in the Oh My God What A Complete Aisling novels. Aisling was the 9th most popular name for baby girls in Ireland in 1990 (471 times used), and the 8th most popular in 1991 (451 times used), though by 2018 it had dropped to the 96th most popular (62 times used).

== People ==
- Aisling Bea (born 1984), Irish comedian
- Aisling Burnand (born 1964), British businesswoman and lobbyist
- Aisling Daly (born 1987), Irish mixed martial arts fighter
- Aislinn Derbez, (born 1987), Mexican actress
- Aisling Franciosi (born 1993), Irish-Italian actress
- Aisling Jarrett-Gavin (born 1989/1990), English actress
- Aisleyne Horgan-Wallace (born 1978), British glamour model and Big Brother contestant
- Aislinn Hunter (born 1969), Canadian writer
- Aislin Jones (born 2000), Australian skeet shooter
- Aisling Loftus (born 1990), English actress of Irish parentage
- Aislín McGuckin (born 1974), Northern Irish actress
- Aislinn Meaney (born 1998), Irish association footballer
- Ashling Murphy (died 2022), Irish primary school teacher and traditional musician, murdered in 2022
- Aisling O'Neill, Irish actress
- Ashling O'Shea, British-Irish actress
- Aisling O'Sullivan (born 1968), Irish actress
- Aisling O'Sullivan (academic), Irish ecological engineer
- Aislinn Paul (born 1994), Canadian actress
- Aisling Swaine, Irish academic
- Aislin, the pen name of Canadian political cartoonist Terry Mosher (born 1942)

== Fictional characters ==
- Aisling, the titular subject in the song "Aisling", on Shane MacGowan's 1994 album The Snake
- Aisling, the main character in Malinda Lo's novel Ash
- Aisling in the Irish animated TV programme Ballybraddan
- Aisling in the anonymous novel Diary of an Oxygen Thief
- Aisling, a hero in the video game Gigantic
- Aisling in the novel Son of the Shadows
- Aisling, aspiring film director in the play Stones in His Pockets
- Aisling, a young faerie girl in the animated film The Secret of Kells
- Aisling (character), the protagonist of the Aisling book series by Emer McLysaght and Sarah Breen, Irish Book Awards multiple winner
- Ashling, the Pilgrim, a character in the TCG Magic: The Gathering female fire elemental, traveling through her world
- Aisling, a recurring character in the British-made sitcom Derry Girls
- Queen Aislinn, wife of the tyrant King Freyne and mother of King Einon in the movie Dragonheart
- Ashelin, a character in the Jak and Daxter video game series, introduced in Jak II
- Aisling Duval, a princess of the Empire in the video game Elite: Dangerous
- Aislinn Foy, the main character in Melissa Marr's novel Wicked Lovely
- Aisling Laffrey, a character in the video game Path of Exile, member of Immortal Syndicate
- Aisling "Ash" McCarthy, one of the two main characters in the novel Like
- Aisling Noon, a character in The Wheel of Time book series by Robert Jordan
- Aisling O'Connor, a main character in the novel Light a Penny Candle
- Aisling O'Dowd, a character in the television show Can't Cope, Won't Cope
- Aisling Querelle, a character in the television show Carnival Row
- Aislinn Wishart, a character in the Japanese manga Saki

== See also ==
- Ashlyn (disambiguation)
- Ashley (name)
- List of Irish-language given names
