= John Ash =

John Ash may refer to:

- John Ash (physician) (1723–1798), British physician
- John Ash (divine) (c. 1724–1779), lexicographer and minister
- John Ash (American politician) (1783–1872), Alabama state senator
- John Ash (Canadian politician) (1821–1886), Member of the Legislative Assembly for Comox riding in British Columbia, Canada
- John Ash (ornithologist) (1925–2014), British ornithologist
- John Ash (writer) (1948–2019), poet, writer and travel writer
- John Ash (MP for Totnes) (fl. 1420–1439), English politician

== See also ==
- John Ash House, a historic residence near Ashville, Alabama, U.S.
- John Ash House (Savannah, Georgia), a building in Savannah, Georgia, U.S.
- John Ashe (disambiguation)
- Ash (disambiguation)
- Ash (name)
