= Vince Zampella =

American video game designer (1970–2025)

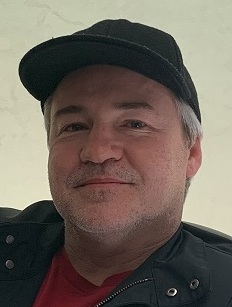
- Zampella in 2019
- Born: Vincent Walter Zampella II; October 1, 1969
- Died: December 21, 2025 (aged 56); San Gabriel Mountains National Monument, California, U.S.
- Occupation: Video game designer
- Years active: 2003–2025
- Notable work: Call of Duty; Medal of Honor; Titanfall; Titanfall 2; Apex Legends; Star Wars Jedi: Fallen Order; Star Wars Jedi: Survivor; Battlefield 6
- Title: Co-founder of Infinity Ward and Respawn Entertainment
- Children: 3

Vincent Walter Zampella II (October 1, 1969 – December 21, 2025) was an American video game designer. He was best known for being a co-founder and the former studio head of Infinity Ward, the head of Respawn Entertainment, and the former CEO of Ripple Effect Studios.

== Early life and career ==
Vincent Walter Zampella II was born on October 1, 1969. As a child, he developed an early interest in video games, having Donkey Kong as his childhood favorite. After dropping out of Broward College (then Broward Community College) in Fort Lauderdale, Florida, Zampella worked as a handyman. A friend helped him get a job at game company GameTek, where he performed various roles such as customer service and game testing. In an interview with Gamezilla, Zampella said he "started out in graphic design and digital video at GameTek, then went to Atari to help launch its PC division" sometime before 1997. He also worked at Panasonic Interactive Media/Ripcord Games and SegaSoft, where he met Jason West, with whom he later founded Infinity Ward along with Grant Collier.

In September 1999, Zampella moved from Silicon Valley to work for 2015 in Tulsa, Oklahoma. By 2001, he was director of development of 2015. He worked there through 2002; during that time he was credited as the lead designer for the critically acclaimed Medal of Honor: Allied Assault.

== Infinity Ward ==
Shortly after Infinity Ward's creation, Electronic Arts decided to move Medal of Honor development in-house, and Infinity Ward took a deal with Activision to create a new game, codenamed "MOH (Medal of Honor) Killer". "MOH Killer" became Call of Duty, and Activision acquired Infinity Ward shortly after the game's release. At the same time, Zampella and fellow Infinity Ward employee Jason West signed long-term employment contracts with Activision. Under Zampella's and West's leadership, Infinity Ward released Call of Duty 2 (2005), Call of Duty 4: Modern Warfare (2007), and Call of Duty: Modern Warfare 2 (2009).

== Respawn Entertainment and EA ==
Months after the successful release of Modern Warfare 2, Zampella and Jason West were fired by Activision and denied "$36 million in bonuses and royalties they'd been expecting". The pair sued Activision for wrongful termination that week and founded Respawn Entertainment a month later. During the years-long Activision suit, Zampella and West demanded $1 billion in damages from Activision, up from the initial $36 million. Other former Infinity Ward employees joined the suit. In May 2012, Activision paid the other ex-employees $42 million in a non-settlement, mid-trial payment, and later in June that year eventually settled with Zampella and West for an undisclosed amount.

After founding Respawn in April 2010, West and Zampella signed with Electronic Arts for the release of their next game. West left Respawn in March 2013. The studio released two Titanfall games and then was acquired by EA in November 2017. In January 2020, EA announced that Zampella would lead the Los Angeles branch of DICE. In 2021, EA put Zampella in charge of the Battlefield franchise after the "challenging" launch of Battlefield 2042 and the departure of Oskar Gabrielson, general manager of DICE. DICE LA was renamed Ripple Effect Studios in July 2021. Under EA, Respawn released Apex Legends, Star Wars Jedi: Fallen Order (both 2019), and Star Wars Jedi: Survivor (2023), while Ripple Effect Studios released Battlefield 6 (2025).

== Personal life ==
In a 2001 interview, Zampella said that he had "always been an avid computer user and gamer". At the time he was a casual Counter-Strike player. According to TMZ, Zampella's wife Brigitte filed for divorce in 2015, and they had three children. In late 2025 Zampella was in the early stages of creating an exotic car dealership, production company and studio space in partnership with Emelia Hartford.

== Death ==
Zampella died on December 21, 2025, while he was driving a Ferrari 296 GTS on the Angeles Crest Highway in the San Gabriel Mountains, north of Los Angeles. At about 12:45 p.m. local time, Zampella lost control of the car after exiting a tunnel, after which the Ferrari veered off-road and struck a concrete barrier. The vehicle quickly caught fire, and a passenger in the vehicle was ejected. The passenger later died at the hospital, while Zampella died at the scene. He was 56 years old. The passenger was later identified as Zachary Marks (38), a technician and robotics enthusiast. The area is known for high-speed driving and racing, and bystanders witnessed and recorded the crash and rendered aid moments later. The Los Angeles County Department of Medical Examiner released a report on the incident in April 2026, stating Zampella died of burns and smoke inhalation, with blunt force trauma as a significant contributing factor. The death was ruled accidental.

Electronic Arts released a statement calling Zampella "a friend, colleague, leader and visionary creator" whose influence on the video game industry was "profound and far-reaching". The X accounts for Apex Legends, Battlefield, and Respawn posted statements honoring Zampella. Infinity Ward released a statement honoring Zampella and said that his "legacy of creating iconic, lasting entertainment was immeasurable" and offered condolences to his family and loved ones. Treyarch also released a statement, "We're deeply saddened by Vince Zampella's tragic passing. His legacy as one of the founders of Call of Duty and a legend of our industry will never be forgotten."

The Academy of Interactive Arts & Sciences dedicated a session at the 2026 DICE Summit to Zampella titled "Remembering a Titan". It featured a collection of his friends and colleagues and reflected on "Vince’s inspirations, generosity, personality, and the indelible mark he left on entertainment, the game industry, the teams he worked with, and the hundreds of millions of players whose lives were touched by his games." It included character testimonies by industry figures like Todd Howard, Hideo Kojima, Geoff Keighley and Randy Pitchford.
