= Ashlyn =

- Gender: Female
- Language: English

Origin
- Languages: English, Irish
- Origin: Anglicisation of Aisling
- Meaning: "dream" or "vision"
- Region of origin: England, Ireland

Other names
- Variant form: Ashlynn
- Short form: Ash
- Related names: Aisling, Ashley, Lynn

Ashlyn or Ashlynn is a female given name and surname.

== People with the given name ==
- Ashlyn Gere, American actress
- Ashlyn Harris (born 1985), American soccer player
- Ashlyne Huff (born 1985), American singer
- Ashlyn Kilowan (born 1982), South African cricketer
- Ashlyn Krueger (born 2004), American professional tennis player
- Ashlyn Martin (1946–1991), stage name of Laura Lynn Hale (1946–1991), American model and actress
- Ashlyn Pearce (born 1994), American actress
- Ashlyn Sanchez (born 1996), American actress
- Ashlynn Shade (born 2004), American college basketball player
- Ashlyn Watkins (born 2003), American college basketball player
- Ashlyn Rae Willson (born 1993), American musician better known as Ashe
  - Ashlyn (album), 2021 album by Ashe
- Ashlynn Yennie (born 1985), American actress

== People with the surname ==
- Quenton Ashlyn (1858–1933), British socialite
- Shannon Ashlyn (born 1986), Australian actress

== Fictional characters ==
- Ashlynn, in the video game Dragon Quest VI: Realms of Revelation
- Ashlyn Halperin, in the American horror franchise Final Destination
- Ashlyn Caswell, in the Disney+ series High School Musical: The Musical: The Series
- Ashlynn Ella, daughter of Cinderella, in Ever After High

== See also ==
- Aisling (name)
- Ashlyns Hall, building in England
- Ashlyns School, in England
