= Effect and Cause =

Level from 2016 video game Titanfall 2

- Gameplay of Titanfall 2, showing the player utilize time travel in the level. The protagonist shifts between a dilapidated present-day base and a functioning past one to progress.
- First appearance: Titanfall 2
- Created by: Jake Keating

"Effect and Cause" is the fifth level in the 2016 video game Titanfall 2. It features a unique gameplay mechanic which allows the player to shift back and forth in time between the level's dilapidated present-day state and its functioning past state. It was created by the senior designer of Titanfall 2, Jake Keating, who was inspired to implement the time travel mechanic in part after watching the History Channel series Life After People. Keating originally intended to use the concept for the first Titanfall, but the designers did not have the time to implement it.

The level uses one map for each of the time periods. The two maps are perfectly aligned with one another, as any misalignment would make the mechanic not function properly. It was the most labor and time-intensive level in the game, going through several revisions in order to make it play well and not confuse players, while still trying to avoid guiding them too much. Environmental art director Todd Sue found the design Keating originally presented to be an artistic mess, though was able to work with it and commended Keating on his game design skills.

The level was highly praised by critics as an excellent example of level design, both in the first-person shooter genre and in general. Eurogamer discussed how it defied its shooter genre, comparing its gameplay and storytelling to Super Mario 3D World and 30 Flights of Loving, respectively, while Game Informer meanwhile praised it for its use of classic gameplay to convey something new.

== Summary ==
At the beginning of the level, Jack Cooper and BT-7274, the protagonists of the game, arrive at ARES Division, an abandoned Interstellar Manufacturing Corporation (IMC) research facility, planning to reconvene with Major Eli Anderson, a Frontier Militia pilot. Jack leaves BT to search the facility for Anderson. As Jack explores the compound, he begins to shift to the past when the facility was operational, before suddenly snapping back to the present. Jack discovers the body of Anderson, which is stuck in the ceiling. Jack retrieves a handheld device from Anderson's body that gives him the ability to transport between the two time periods, fighting the IMC military in the past, and malfunctioning robots and wildlife in the present. By exploring the facility and watching Anderson's memory logs, Jack finds out that the time skips he is experiencing are the result of "The Fold", a prototype doomsday weapon that produces distortions in spacetime to destroy planets. Jack fights his way out of both versions of the facility and reunites with BT. The two of them time travel to just before The Fold is tested to scan the weapon's core. When The Fold explodes, BT and the IMC soldiers defending the weapon are frozen in time, with Jack's time travel device allowing him to move freely and scan the core. Jack loses consciousness and wakes up near BT in the present, although his time-travel device no longer functions. Jack climbs aboard BT, and the pair hurriedly disembark to share their discovery to the rest of the Militia.

== Concept and creation ==
"Effect and Cause" was created by senior designer of Titanfall 2, Jake Keating. The idea for a time travel mechanic and level came from Keating leaving Infinity Ward after a dispute with Activision, where he would then be employed by Respawn Entertainment. At this time, Keating had more creative freedom, focusing on science fiction ideas after working exclusively on Call of Duty for a long time. He was inspired to implement the idea of shifting times by the History Channel series, Life After People, which depicts what the world would look like if humanity suddenly disappeared and would swap between the present and future. He was drawn to this contrast, and pitched the idea of players entering a facility after a space-time accident, using a time travel device to save a scientist. The premise was originally intended to be used for the game's predecessor, but a lack of time led to them not being able to implement a single-player campaign until its sequel. When development of Titanfall 2 began, Keating used a multi-player map from the first game to create a mock-up of what the level would look like, and created a time swapping mechanic. This level was the most labor- and time-intensive one in the game. As a result, Keating had to work extra hard to convince his co-workers of its potential.

The level went through two major revisions during development. When designing the map, Keating and other staff put the past and present areas stacked on top of one another, and the process caused some difficulties, with playtesting finding players warped out of bounds. When players utilize the time travel mechanic, Keating had to make sure that the maps were perfectly vertically aligned so that they would appear in the exact same location between the two maps. The level went through focus testing, with Keating feeling stressed about testers being too confused by this level for years, with his anxiety making him want to "handhold" the players, though he resisted this. Initially, players were meant to go alone to the location of "Effect and Cause," with BT having sacrificed his life to save Jack, but this was scrapped after the story began developing further.

The level remained "in flux" during development for a long time due to Keating making both big and small changes, which he felt would bother sound and art designers, but avoid them having to scrap their work if any changes required they do so. Keating originally intended to have a mall setting, envisioning the overall campus as much larger than it was in the end. The mall setting was later changed to be a cryogenic prison. He cited this as an example of a level designer giving the art designer "incomprehensible" level geometry, praising the art designers for their work. Environmental art director Todd Sue discussed how the concept Keating gave was an "atrocity to art," noting that Keating is known for this kind of thing, though he praises his game design work overall. In an earlier version of the level, enemies would continue to move when players were in a different time period. This was later changed in order to make it more entertaining.

== Reception ==
Gamasutra writer Bryant Francis called it an "interesting sample" of Titanfall 2's strengths. They suggested that designers could learn a lot from this level while making their own. Mic writer Alex Perry found it mindblowing in a way first-person shooters usually are not. Push Square writer Liam Croft identified it as one of the best levels in a first-person shooter of its generation. RPG Site writer Josh Torres praised the level as an "impressive technical feat on a structural level and a gameplay level." PCGamesN writer Matt Purslow felt that "Effect and Cause" is what demonstrated Respawn's "understanding of what makes their game unique." On December 15, 2016, GamesRadar+ writer Leon Hurley recommended the level as something players should experience before the year ends. They discussed how this level would give players "disbelief" when they realize how extensive the level's hook is. They felt that it was one of the best video game levels of all time, a sentiment that The Telegraph staff shared. Vice writers Patrick Klepek and Sayem Ahmed both regarded it as a highlight of Titanfall 2, with the former wishing that he had more time to utilize the time travel mechanic. GameSpot writer Robert Handlery called it the most memorable part of the game.

Game Informer writer Brian Shea felt that it was among the best-designed levels in a video game. Fellow Game Informer writer Javy Gwaltney talked about how "Effect and Cause" demonstrates a "subtle kind of ambition"; as opposed to other games which may focus on the size of the world or number of the quests, Gwaltney argues that the designers used classic game design to make something "bold and exhilarating." PC Gamer Tom Senior called it one of the best levels of 2016, stating that its ideas are "brilliant" and "flawlessly executed." Fellow PC Gamer writer Chris Thurston called it a "standout" level, saying that it would not be "out of place" in the first-person shooter series Half-Life. USgamer Doc Burford disputed the notion that "Effect and Cause" was the best level in Titanfall 2, instead giving that title to The Beacon. They praised "Effect and Cause" as a great and "clever" level, though argued that "Effect and Cause" is "cerebral," whereas The Beacon focuses on "heart." Eurogamer writer Christian Donlan suggested that it would be "heavily quoted" for years, and discussed how its gameplay defies genre; while it is a shooter, Donlan felt similarities between it and the platform game Super Mario 3D World and the cinematic story game 30 Flights of Loving.
