= John Ashe =

John Ashe may refer to:

- John Ashe (minister) (1671–1735), English dissenting minister
- John Ashe (of Freshford) (1597–1658), MP for Westbury
- John Ashe (priest) (born 1953), Church of England priest and Archdeacon of Lynn
- John Ashe (general) (c. 1720–1781), American Revolutionary War figure
- John Baptist Ashe (1748–1802), North Carolina delegate to the Continental Congress
- John Baptista Ashe (1810–1857), U.S. Congressman from Tennessee
- John William Ashe (1954–2016), President of the sixty-eighth session of the United Nations General Assembly

== See also ==
- John Ayshe, MP for Wells
- John Ash (disambiguation)
