= Titanfall: Assault =

2017 video game

- iOS App Store artwork
- Developers: Particle City; Respawn Entertainment (Electronic Arts)
- Publisher: Nexon
- Series: Titanfall
- Platforms: iOS, Android
- Release: August 10, 2017
- Genre: Real-time strategy
- Mode: Multiplayer

Titanfall: Assault was a real-time strategy video game in the Titanfall series for mobile platforms in the style of Clash Royale. It was developed by Particle City and Respawn Entertainment from Electronic Arts, published by Nexon, and released for iOS and Android in August 2017.

All servers for Titanfall: Assault were shut down on July 30, 2018, and it was removed from Google Play one day later on July 31, 2018.
