= William H. Ash =

American politician (1859–1908)

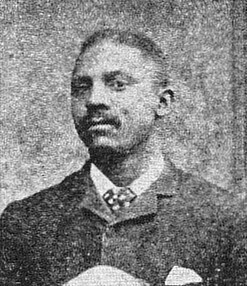
- Ash in 1887/88

Personal details
- Born: May 15, 1859 Loudoun County, Virginia
- Died: February 14, 1908 (aged 48) Virginia Normal and Industrial Institute
- Party: Republican
- Spouse: Sallie B. Miller Ash
- Parent(s): William H. Ash, Martha A. Ash
- Occupation: Politician, teacher

William Horace Ash (May 15, 1859 – February 14, 1908) was an African-American politician and former slave. He was a member of the Virginia House of Delegates during the 1887–1888 session. In 2012, he was one of several African-Americans recognized by the MLK Commission and the Virginia Senate for being elected to the Virginia General Assembly during the Reconstruction Era.

== Personal and early life ==
Ash was born a slave on May 15, 1859, in Loudoun County, Virginia. He attended the Hampton Normal and Agricultural Institute, where he graduated in 1882. He worked as a teacher for many years and helped found the Teachers Reading Circle, a short-lived organization for African American educators. On May 29, 1889, Ash married Sallie B. Miller, with whom he had no children. During his time as a politician Ash studied law and self-identified as a lawyer, although there is no record of him having actively practiced this profession.

After retiring from politics Ash returned to teaching and in 1907, began teaching at the Virginia Normal and Industrial Institute. He died at this college on February 14, 1908, from kidney failure.

== Political career ==
Ash became interested in politics while working as a teacher. In 1884 he served as the Nottoway County delegate to the Virginia state party convention for the Republican Party and in 1887, was nominated by this party to the Virginia House of Delegates. He did not have much in the way of competition and won the seat easily, despite Ash having concerns over his support of the powerful and controversial William Mahone. Ash only served for one term and in 1888 was replaced by Henry Johnson.

== See also ==
- African American officeholders from the end of the Civil War until before 1900
