= Diary of an Oxygen Thief =

2006 novel by Anonymous

- Author: Anonymous
- Language: English
- Genre: Memoir
- Publisher: Self Published
- Publication date: 2006
- Publication place: Netherlands
- Media type: Print
- Pages: 147 pp.
- ISBN: 978-0615275062
- Followed by: Chameleon in a Candy Store

Diary of an Oxygen Thief is a 2006 Dutch novel, written anonymously and published in Amsterdam by NLVI. Diary of an Oxygen Thief was called a "surprise dark-horse Williamsburg best seller" by New York Magazine, referring to the independent art, literature, and music scene in Brooklyn, New York. It is the first book of the Diary of an Oxygen Thief series, followed by Chameleon in a Candy Store and Eunuchs and Nymphomaniacs.

== Summary ==
Purporting to be an autobiography, Diary of an Oxygen Thief begins with the narrator, an Irish advertising executive living in London, describing the pleasure he used to receive from emotionally abusing women. After the narrator starts attending AA meetings, he sobers up and looks back on his past relationships with a measure of remorse. After taking a job in the United States, the narrator is confronted externally by the absurdity of corporate North America, culture shock, and the conflict of moving from the lower to upper-middle class. Internally he grapples with paranoia, addiction, and a legacy of pain. Later, he meets a young, aspiring photographer in New York and falls in love with her.

The "Oxygen Thief" in the title refers to the narrator's low self-esteem. Because of his sense of self-loathing, he seems to go through life believing he is unworthy of the very air he breathes.

== Reception ==
Diary of an Oxygen Thief quickly became popular from its initial publication in 2006 to 2016 where it was listed on both Amazon and iTunes 20 top selling books. It was republished in 2016 by Simon & Schuster imprint Gallery Books.
