= Aisling O'Sullivan (academic) =

Professor in Ecological Engineering in New Zealand

Academic background
- Education: University College Dublin, National University of Ireland
- Thesis: Constructed wetlands for passive biological treatment of mine tailings water at Tara Mines, Ireland (2001)

Aisling Dominique O'Sullivan is an Irish–New Zealand academic, and is a full professor at the University of Canterbury, specialising in ecological engineering for removal of heavy metals and nutrients from wastewater, in urban and rural environments and as part of mining remediation.

== Academic career ==
O'Sullivan was born and grew up in Ireland. She completed a PhD titled Constructed wetlands for passive biological treatment of mine tailings water at Tara Mines, Ireland at the National University of Ireland. From 2001 to 2003, O'Sullivan undertook postdoctoral research at the Center for Restoration of Ecosystems and Watersheds of at the Gallogly College of Engineering at the University of Oklahoma. O'Sullivan then joined the faculty of the University of Canterbury, rising to Professor of Ecological Engineering. O'Sullivan is the leader of the Centre for EcoLogical Technical Solution at Canterbury.

O'Sullivan's early research was on removal of heavy metals from contaminated water. Working at former mining sites in both Ireland and Oklahoma, she became aware of the ecological and environmental damage that heavy metals in mine tailings can do. O'Sullivan investigates and develops technology for both heavy metal and nutrient reduction in wastewater in urban and rural environments, and has also researched constructed wetlands for water remediation. As part of the Science for Technological Innovation National Science Challenge, O'Sullivan led a three-year (beginning in 2021) multidisciplinary research project to develop new technology for treating wastewater. The research team aimed to use 3D printing and additive manufacturing to produce biodegradable wastewater treatment filters for nutrient removal. O'Sullivan has also investigated the use of mussel shells as a low-cost natural biodegradable material to clean up heavy metals in roof and mine run-off.

== Selected works ==
- Craig A McCauley; O'Sullivan, Aisling Dominique; Milke, Mark W.; Weber, Paul; Trumm, David A. (2008). "Sulfate and metal removal in bioreactors treating acid mine drainage dominated with iron and aluminum". Water Research. 43 (4): 961–970. doi:10.1016/j.watres.2008.11.029. PMID 19070349. Wikidata Q43366667.
- D Wicke; Cochrane, Thomas Arey; O'Sullivan, Aisling Dominique (2012). "Build-up dynamics of heavy metals deposited on impermeable urban surfaces". Journal of Environmental Management. 113: 347–354. doi:10.1016/j.jenvman.2012.09.005. PMID 23044158. Wikidata Q34436301.
- O'Sullivan, Aisling Dominique (2003). "Heavy Metals in the Environment: Using Wetlands for their Removal". Ecological Engineering. 21 (1): 111–112. doi:10.1016/s0925-8574(03)00031-4. Wikidata Q115437687.
- Frances J Charters; Cochrane, Thomas Arey; O'Sullivan, Aisling Dominique (2016). "Untreated runoff quality from roof and road surfaces in a low intensity rainfall climate". Science of the Total Environment. 550: 265–272. doi:10.1016/j.scitotenv.2016.01.093. PMID 26820930. Wikidata Q40348261.
- Julia M Valigore; Peter A Gostomski; David G Wareham; O'Sullivan, Aisling Dominique (2012). "Effects of hydraulic and solids retention times on productivity and settleability of microbial (microalgal-bacterial) biomass grown on primary treated wastewater as a biofuel feedstock". Water Research. 46 (9): 2957–2964. doi:10.1016/j.watres.2012.03.023. PMID 22483835. Wikidata Q83829944.
- O'Sullivan, Aisling Dominique; Daniel Wicke; Tyler J Hengen; Heidi L Sieverding; James J Stone (2014). "Life Cycle Assessment modelling of stormwater treatment systems". Journal of Environmental Management. 149: 236–244. doi:10.1016/j.jenvman.2014.10.025. PMID 25463586. Wikidata Q35478395.
- Frances J Charters; Cochrane, Thomas Arey; O'Sullivan, Aisling Dominique (2015). "Particle size distribution variance in untreated urban runoff and its implication on treatment selection". Water Research. 85: 337–345. doi:10.1016/j.watres.2015.08.029. PMID 26343992. Wikidata Q40311075.
