= Apex Legends =

2019 video game

- Developer: Respawn Entertainment (Note: Iron Galaxy co-developed the Nintendo Switch and Nintendo Switch 2 versions. LightSpeed Studios co-developed the mobile version with Respawn Entertainment.)
- Publisher: Electronic Arts
- Director: Steven Ferreira
- Producer: Ben Brinkman
- Designer: Jason McCord
- Artists: Robert Taube; Kaelan De Niese; Ryan Lastimosa; Benjamin Bisson; Jung Park
- Writer: Mohammad Alavi
- Composer: Stephen Barton
- Series: Titanfall
- Engine: Source; Unreal Engine 4 (mobile)
- Platforms: PlayStation 4; Windows; Xbox One; Nintendo Switch (Note: Until August 4, 2026); Nintendo Switch 2; PlayStation 5; Xbox Series X/S; Android; iOS
- Release: PS4, Windows, Xbox One; February 4, 2019; Nintendo Switch; March 9, 2021; PS5, Xbox Series X/S; March 29, 2022; Android, iOS; May 17, 2022; Nintendo Switch 2; August 5, 2025
- Genres: Battle royale, first-person hero shooter
- Mode: Multiplayer

Apex Legends is a 2019 battle royale-hero shooter video game developed by Respawn Entertainment and published by Electronic Arts, set in the same science fiction universe as Respawn's Titanfall series. It is offered free-to-play and is continuously updated under the games as a service model; the game was originally released for PlayStation 4, Windows, and Xbox One in February 2019 and was followed by versions for Nintendo Switch in 2021 and both PlayStation 5 and Xbox Series X/S in 2022, and Nintendo Switch 2 in 2025. All versions support cross-platform multiplayer. A mobile version designed for touchscreens was briefly available until its discontinuation in 2023.

Before the match, players form into 1 to 4-player squads and select from pre-designed characters with distinct abilities, known as "Legends". The game has multiple gameplay modes - with a range of team sizes. The battle royale mode hosts up to 20 three-person squads or 15 two-person duos. In "Arenas", players form into three-player squads and fight against another squad in a 3v3 team deathmatch over a series of rounds to determine the winner of the match. Teams win when their team has at least 3 points and is 2 points ahead.

Work on Apex Legends began around late 2016, though the project remained a secret right up until its launch. The game's release in 2019 came as a surprise, as the game released suddenly without any prior marketing or official announcement. Until that point, it had been assumed that Respawn Entertainment was working on a third installment to the Titanfall franchise, the studio's previous major game, although a number of Titanfall characters do appear as minor characters or playable Legends.

Apex Legends received generally positive reviews from critics, who praised its gameplay, progression system, and fusion of elements from various genres. Some considered it a worthy competitor to other battle royale games. Apex Legends surpassed 25 million players by the end of its first week, and 50 million within its first month. By April 2021, it had approximately 100 million players, making it one of the most played video games of all time by player count.

== Gameplay ==
Apex Legends is an online multiplayer battle royale game featuring squads of three players using pre-made characters with distinctive abilities, called "Legends", similar to those of hero shooters. Alternate modes have been introduced allowing for up to four-player squads since the game's release. The game is free-to-play and monetized through microtransactions and loot boxes, which allow the player to spend both real money and in-game currency on cosmetic items, such as outfits for the Legends and new colors for weapons. Each character in the squad has a unique design, personality, and abilities that provide different playstyles to the team. Starting with Season 16, each legend is assigned to one of the five unique class styles: Assault, Skirmisher, Recon, Controller and Support.

=== Battle Royale ===
A gameplay screenshot showing the game's ping system

Each match generally features twenty teams of three-player squads. Players can join friends in a squad or can be matched randomly with other players. Before the match, each player on the squad selects one of the 25 playable characters (as of season 19), with the exception that no character may be selected more than once by a squad.

All teams are then placed on an aircraft that passes over the game map. One player in each squad is the jumpmaster, selecting when the squad should skydive out of the aircraft and where to land with the concurrence of the other squad members. However, players are free to deviate from the squad's path.

Once on the ground, the squad can scavenge for weapons, armor, and other equipment that is scattered around buildings, or in crates randomly distributed around the map, while keeping an eye out for other squads. Apex Legends includes a nonverbal communication "ping system" which allows players to use their game controller to communicate to their squad certain directions, weapon locations, enemies, and suggested strategies. While the game offers movement options similar to other shooters, it includes some of the gameplay features of previous Titanfall games, such as the ability to climb over short walls, slide down inclined surfaces, and use zip-lines to traverse an area quickly.

Over time, the game's safe zone will reduce in size around a randomly-selected point on the map; players outside the safe zone take damage and may die if they do not reach the safe zone in time. This also confines squads to smaller spaces to force encounters. The last squad with any members left alive is crowned the "Apex Champions" of that match. Players who become knocked down in the course of a game can be revived by their squadmates. Should a player be killed completely, they can still be resurrected if their team member(s) collect their respawn banner, which appears at the place where they died, and bring it to one of several beacons on the island. The banner, however, must be collected within a time limit, before expiring and eliminating the player.

=== Mixtape ===
Mixtape is a rotation of three modes: Team Deathmatch, Control and Gun Run.

Mode	Player count	Objective
Team Deathmatch	6 vs. 6	40 team kills
Control	9 vs. 9	Capture and hold points
Gun Run	1 squad vs. 3 squads	Kills through a 25-weapon track

=== Limited-time modes ===
In addition to the season contents, Apex Legends featured limited-time events. These events offered unique, limited-time cosmetics themed to the event (for example, in the case of the Holo-Day Bash, Christmas-themed outfits) that could be earned in-game. Events also provided unique limited-time game modes (such as shotguns and snipers only). Some events also introduced changes to the current season map with a new point of interest (known as a "Town Takeover"), which was themed around one of the legends.

Title	Season	Period	Description
Legendary Hunt	1	June 4, 2019 – June 18, 2019	The first limited-time event introduced the "Elite Queue" mode. To enter this mode, players had to have made it to the top 5 in their previous match. The cosmetics in this event were hunting/skeletal themed.
Iron Crown	2	August 13, 2019 – August 27, 2019.	The event introduced the first Town Takeover in the form of Octane's Gauntlet. It added the Solo LTM and featured cosmetics themed around royalty.
Voidwalker	3	September 3, 2019 – September 17, 2019	The event added the Singh Labs location to Kings Canyon. The "Armed And Dangerous" LTM was also introduced. The event cosmetics were themed around Wraith/"Void."
Fight or Fright (2019)	4	October 15, 2019 – November 5, 2019	The event added the "Shadowfall" LTM, which allowed players to return as the "Shadow Squad" after death with enhanced abilities. It featured cosmetics with a Halloween/corrupted theme.
Holo-Day Bash (2019)	5	December 12, 2019 – January 7, 2020	The event added the "Winter Express" mode, a domination-style game in which squads attempted to capture a train. It also introduced winter/holiday-themed cosmetics. A new location, Mirage Voyage, was added alongside the event.
Grand Soirée	6	January 14, 2020 – January 28, 2020	The event featured seven modes, each lasting two days. The modes were (in order of appearance): "Gold Rush Duos" (duos with all weapons legendary), "LIVE.DIE.LIVE" (automatic respawns), "Third-Person Mode," "Always Be Closing" (the ring constantly closed), "Armed and Dangerous on World's Edge," "Kings Canyon After Dark," and "DUMMIE's Big Day" (all Legends replaced by differently colored "DUMMIEs" with unique abilities). The event also introduced high-class, black-and-gold cosmetics.
System Override	7	March 3, 2020 – March 17, 2020	The "Deja Loot" mode removed all randomly-generated events from the game, meaning all loot drops (excluding Care Packages) and ring locations (which changed daily) remained the same every match. The event also introduced Evo Shields, shields that could be upgraded by dealing damage to enemy players and were later added to the main game. The cosmetics were computer/tech-themed.
The Old Ways	8	April 7, 2020 – April 21, 2020	The event's cosmetics were themed after Bloodhound. The "Bloodhound's Trials" location was added to World's Edge. There were no limited-time game modes during this event, although the Duos game mode was added permanently, alongside a map rotation between King's Canyon and World's Edge.
Lost Treasures	9	June 23, 2020 – July 7, 2020	The "Armed and Dangerous Evolved" mode, based on the previous "Armed and Dangerous" event, forced players to use an Evo Shield provided at the start of the match. The event introduced the Mobile Respawn Beacon, an item that deploys a Respawn Beacon when used, which was added to all modes after the event concluded. The cosmetics were pirate- and gold-themed.
Aftermarket	10	October 6, 2020 – October 20, 2020	The limited-time game mode "Flashpoint" removed all healing item spawns from the map. Players could craft a "Phoenix Kit" or use "Flashpoints," which healed them over time. The event cosmetics featured racing decals and streetwear.
Fight or Fright (2020)	11	October 22, 2020 – November 3, 2020	The "Shadow Royale" mode combined normal Trios gameplay with the previous "Shadowfall" mode. Dead players became "Shadows," losing their abilities and having reduced health but gaining increased speed, strength, and the ability to wall run. The cosmetics were Halloween- and evil-themed.
Holo-Day Bash (2020)	12	December 1, 2020 – January 4, 2021	The event reintroduced the "Winter Express" game mode with minor changes. It also featured winter- and holiday-themed cosmetics.
Fight Night	13	January 5, 2021 – January 19, 2021	The event added the "Airdrop Escalation" mode, which increased the frequency of care package drops. The cosmetics were themed around boxing and fighting.
Anniversary (2021)	14	February 9, 2021 – March 2, 2021	The event added the "Locked and Loaded" mode which gave players low-tier weapons and armor at the beginning of a match. It also added cosmetics which were red and black recolors of popular skins.
Chaos Theory	15	March 9, 2021 – March 23, 2021	The event added the "Ring Fury" mode, which spawned "ring flares" across the map during matches. It also introduced "Heat Shields" that generated small domes protecting players from the ring temporarily. Additionally, the "Survival Slot" was added to accommodate Mobile Respawn Beacons and Heat Shields. The cosmetics featured an apocalypse theme.
War Games	16	April 13, 2021 – April 27, 2021	The War Games event featured multiple rotating modes similar to the Grand Soirée event. The modes appeared in this order: "Second Chance" (each player had one automatic respawn per match), "Ultra Zones" (matches contained multiple "Hot Zones" with high-quality loot that healed players over time), "Auto Banners" (banner cards were automatically retrieved), "Killing Time" (the ring timer shortened every time a player was killed), and "Armor Regen". The event featured war and royalty themed cosmetics.
Genesis	17	June 29, 2021 – July 13, 2021	The "Legacy Maps" takeover reverted Kings Canyon and World's Edge to their original layouts. The event featured cosmetics themed around anime and space.
Thrillseekers	18	July 13, 2021 – August 3, 2021	"Thrillseekers" was the first Arenas-focused event, introducing the "Overflow" map and featuring anime-themed cosmetics.
Evolution	19	September 14, 2021 – September 28, 2021	The "Arenas Extravaganza" takeover – the first takeover for Arenas – lowered prices in Arenas. In addition, the cosmetics added include alien/space themes.
Monsters Within (Fight or Fright 2021)	20	October 12, 2021 – November 2, 2021	The 2021 Halloween event reintroduced the "Shadow Royale" mode for its final week and added a new Arenas map, "Encore." The event featured Halloween and dark-themed cosmetics.
Holo-Day Bash (2021)	21	December 7, 2021 – December 27, 2021	The "Winter Express" mode returned, introducing selectable loadouts at the start of each match. The event also featured holiday and winter-themed cosmetics.
Raiders	22	December 7, 2021 – December 21, 2021	The event introduced new cosmetic items, a new town takeover, and an heirloom for Wattson.
Dark Depths	23	January 11, 2022 – February 1, 2022	The event added a new Arenas map, new cosmetics, and challenges.
Anniversary (2022)	24	February 15, 2022 – March 1, 2022	The event introduced new cosmetic items and the 9v9 limited-time mode "Control," where Legends compete to control designated areas on the map.
Warriors	25	March 29, 2022 – April 12, 2022	The event brought back the "Control" mode with a new map centered on Caustic Treatment, added a new Arenas map, and introduced new cosmetics.
Unshackled	26	April 19, 2022 – May 3, 2022	The "Flashpoint" limited-time mode returned on Olympus, accompanied by new cosmetics that remained in the loot pool after the event concluded.
Awakening	27	June 21, 2022 – July 5, 2022	Control returned with Lava Siphon from World's Edge added to the map rotation. The event introduced a new collection event featuring Valkyrie's heirloom and added Lifeline's Clinic as a new POI on Olympus.
Gaiden	28	July 19, 2022 – August 2, 2022	Armed and Dangerous returned as an LTM. The event added new anime-themed cosmetics, which remained in the loot pool after the event concluded.
Beast of Prey	29	September 20, 2022 - October 4, 2022	The event introduced the limited-time mode Gun Run. Loba received an heirloom, and 24 Alien/Predator-themed cosmetics were made available for purchase.
Fight or Fright (2022)	30	October 4, 2022 –November 1, 2022	The fourth annual Halloween event added new Halloween-themed cosmetics to the Store without a collection reward. The map Olympus featured a Halloween takeover called Olympus After Dark during the first and fourth weeks. Shadow Royale returned in those weeks, while Control and Gun Run modes were available in the second and third weeks, played on Olympus After Dark POIs: Estates (After Dark) for Gun Run and Hammond Labs (Labs After Dark) for Control. The lobby was also revamped with a Halloween theme.
Wintertide (Christmas 2022)	31	December 6, 2022 – December 27, 2022	The fourth annual Christmas event in Apex Legends featured the return of Winter Express, introduced a Prestige Skin for Wraith, and added 24 winter-themed cosmetics.
Spellbound	32	January 10, 2023 – January 24, 2023	Control returns with general improvements and private matches are introduced. Seer receives his heirloom.
Celestial Sunrise	33	January 24, 2023 – February 7, 2023	The event features the limited-time mode Hardcore Royale. The collection reward is a recolor of an existing reactive Peacekeeper skin. It also includes 24 Chinese New Year-themed cosmetics.
Anniversary (2023)	34	February 14, 2023 – February 28, 2023	The fourth anniversary event of Apex Legends features new trio-themed cosmetics available for purchase, with 150 Heirloom Shards as the collection reward. It includes two free Anniversary Packs in the free Prize Tracker, several standard Apex Packs, and community-created skins and Banner Frames.
Imperial Guard	35	March 7, 2023 - March 21, 2023	Wraith's third heirloom—a recolor of her original Kunai—is introduced. The event includes 24 Imperial-themed cosmetics and adds the Mixtape rotation mode, featuring Team Deathmatch, Control, and Gun Run.
Sun Squad	36	March 28, 2023 - April 11, 2023	Ash's heirloom is the collection reward. The event offers 24 beach and summer-themed cosmetics and introduces the limited-time mode Heatwave.
Veiled	37	April 25, 2023 - May 9, 2023	The event features 24 masquerade-themed cosmetics and grants Caustic a Prestige skin as the collection reward. The revamped Team Deathmatch mode, TDM – Deadeye, is available throughout the event.
Threat Level	38	May 23, 2023 - June 6, 2023	This event is a major store sale, featuring 23 alien-themed recolored cosmetics for purchase. Control received its own dedicated playlist due to being the most-voted mode, resulting in two weeks of continuous Control gameplay. TDM – Deadeye (Unshielded Deadeye) also returned for the event's duration.
Dressed to Kill	39	June 20, 2023 – July 4, 2023	The first collection event of the season introduced Horizon's heirloom. The event featured 24 hitman-themed cosmetics available for purchase. Horizon's heirloom unlocks automatically after purchasing all other event items.
Neon Network	40	July 21, 2023 –August 8, 2023	Valkyrie receives her Prestige Skin as the collection reward. The Battle Royale Takeover introduces the Node Tracker, directing players to Loot Tick spawns that grant loot and 800–900 Nodes, usable for special Item Shop rewards. The event features the "A Thief's Bane" quest with Loba as the sole playable Legend, alongside 24 cyberpunk/neon-themed cosmetics for purchase.
Death Dynasty	41	August 8, 2023 – August 22, 2023	The event introduced the permanent "Mixtape" mode, rotating through modes like TDM and Gun Run. It also added a recolor of Revenant's Heirloom and featured death/gothic-themed cosmetics.
Harbingers	42	September 19, 2023 - October 3, 2023	The event introduced the "Living Shell Trios" limited-time mode and added the Fuse Heirloom Set. Cosmetics were themed around undead and royalty.

Minor events occasionally introduced only purchasable cosmetics (e.g., "Summer of Plunder" and "Arena Flash Events" across Seasons 9–10) or limited-time modes without exclusive collectibles, such as the Battle Armor mode (April 28 to May 12, 2020), where players started matches with armor and a gun.

==== Arenas ====
Season 9 introduced a new mode named "Arenas". In this mode, players form into three-player squads and fight against another squad in a 3v3 team deathmatch over a series of rounds to determine the winner of the match. Teams win when their team has at least 3 points and is 2 points ahead. Additionally, if a game should drag on to round 9 (where both teams have 4 points) a final sudden death round begins. Respawn stated this scoring system "prevents total blowout games from dragging on for too long" and also "lets more competitive games keep the heat going for longer".

Rather than skydiving onto the map and gathering equipment like in the battle royale mode, players spawn in a "shop" where they can purchase equipment and charges of their Legend's abilities using materials earned in the previous rounds to prepare for the next fight. This variation of the game borrows mechanics from other shooters such as Counter-Strike and Valorant. The mode is the first permanent deviation away from the battle royale format. It would later be removed in Season 16. Now Season 20 update, Breakout, introduces significant changes with upgradeable skill trees for playable Legends, offering MOBA-like progression and promising intense battles.

== Seasons ==
Every new season is accompanied by the release of a new playable character, new weapons, or purchasable cosmetic items.

The game's first season began on March 19, 2019. Associated with seasons are time‑limited battle passes that reward players with new cosmetic items, provided that they complete in‑game challenges during the season. In addition to new cosmetic items, the release of a season adds changes to the map and additional gameplay elements.

Season	Title	Period	Description
1	Wild Frontier	March 19, 2019 – June 18, 2019	The first season of Apex Legends introduced the playable character Octane and implemented several bug fixes and quality‑of‑life improvements, including adjustments to so‑called hitboxes—each Legend's predefined damageable zone based on their size and shape—and enhancements to the characters' unique abilities. It also launched the game's inaugural battle pass and added numerous new cosmetic items.
2	Battle Charge	July 2, 2019 – October 1, 2019	With season 2, the developers introduced another playable character called Wattson and also re-designed the layout of the game's island. Following an explosion (shown in the season's trailer), roaming alien wildlife, known as leviathans and flyers, have been attracted to the island and destroyed large areas, rendering parts of the map unrecognizable from the previous season. Season 2 also released a new weapon and introduced a new ranked mode of play, allowing players of a similar skill to play against each other, and adjusting a player's ranking based on their game performance.
3	Meltdown	October 1, 2019 – February 4, 2020	A new Legend named Crypto was introduced, who had tried to rig the Apex Games. A new weapon known as the Charge Rifle was added and changes to Ranked were made. The season also came with a brand new battle pass. A brand new map, named "World's Edge," was also introduced, which had players fighting through volcanic and frozen landscapes. The map also included a train that traveled throughout World's Edge. The season also changed up the meta by removing certain attachments and introducing new ones whilst altering what existing items could do.
4	Assimilation	February 4, 2020 – May 12, 2020	A new Legend named Revenant was introduced, (Note: Forge, a former MMA champion and world-renowned celebrity under the sponsorship from Hammond Robotics, was supposed to be introduced in Season 4, but was later killed by Revenant during his interview before entering into the Apex Games.) a Simulacrum with the memories of his human self. A new sniper weapon known as the Sentinel was added. World's Edge was devastated by a Harvester that appeared in the middle of the map, creating lava faults and changing the environment. Major changes to ranked were made, as a new tier known as "Master" tier was introduced, while the Apex Predator tier was designated for the top 500 players on each platform, meaning players could be pushed out of it.
5	Fortune's Favor	May 12, 2020 – August 18, 2020	A new Legend known as Loba was introduced, a thief with the ability to steal loot from nearby areas and teleport. Loba was out for revenge against Revenant, a simulacrum hitman who had killed her parents. Ranked Series 4 was largely identical to Series 3 and reconnect was added, allowing players to rejoin a session if they disconnected. A new "quest" system was also introduced, which allowed players to fight in PvE missions either solo or with a squad to earn unique rewards. A new battle pass was also introduced. Respawn Entertainment announced they would be expanding their Apex servers to the Middle East. Skull Town and Thunderdome were also destroyed.
6	Boosted	August 18, 2020 – November 4, 2020	A new Legend named Rampart was introduced, a gun modder who can could emplace a minigun which she called "Sheila", and provided amped cover for her team. World's Edge was updated with new points of interest built by Hammond Industries: Launch Site, Countdown, and Staging. A new battle pass was added, which included a new cosmetic reward of "Holo-Sprays", a new crafting mechanic allowed players to upgrade their gear with materials found around the map, and the fan-favorite weapon from Titanfall 2, the Volt SMG, also made its debut. Additionally, all normal armor (except gold armor) was removed from the game.
7	Ascension	November 4, 2020 – February 2, 2021	A new Legend named Horizon was introduced, an astrophysicist who was trapped on the edge of a black hole for 87 real-time years. A brand new map, Olympus, was also introduced, known as a "city in the clouds". The new map also allowed players to traverse it using "Tridents", a form of vehicle for the whole squad. A new battle pass was added, community "clubs" were also added to allow players to meet other like-minded players, and the launch of Season 7 also brought Apex Legends to Steam. The season also introduced a map rotation to the game's normal mode, with Kings Canyon becoming unplayable for the season as a result.
8	Mayhem	February 2, 2021 – May 4, 2021	A new Legend named Fuse was introduced, a psychopath who joined the Apex Games after his planet, Salvo, joined forces with the Syndicate. A new gun called the 30-30 Repeater was introduced, a lever-action rifle. The ranked system received multiple changes, including increasing the number of people in the Apex Predator rank per platform from 500 to 750 players. A new battle pass was introduced, and Kings Canyon was also re-introduced into the map rotation, albeit changed from its previous appearance in the rotation. These changes included adding a previously unplayable area in the north. A golden rarity of an extended magazine was also introduced, which automatically reloaded the holstered weapon after a few seconds.
9	Legacy	May 4, 2021 – August 3, 2021	A new Legend named Valkyrie was introduced, the daughter of known Pilot Viper from Titanfall 2. A new gun called the Bocek Bow was introduced, which shot arrows instead of the usual bullet types. A new battle pass was introduced, and Olympus became infested with natural plant growths and roots. The new season also introduced a new mode called "Arenas".
10	Emergence	August 3, 2021 – November 2, 2021	A new Legend named Seer was introduced, who was shunned by his community as a result of a conceived bad omen. A new gun called the Rampage LMG was introduced. A new battle pass was introduced, and World's Edge was updated, with multiple locations destroyed as a result of the Harvester. The new season also introduced a Ranked version of Arenas.
11	Escape	November 2, 2021 – February 8, 2022	A new simulacrum Legend named Ash was introduced, a returning character who was previously one of the main antagonists from Titanfall 2. A new weapon, the CAR SMG was introduced, which was a gun originally from Titanfall 2. A new tropical Battle Royale map called Storm Point was introduced. A new battle pass was introduced, along with a new Ranked season with tweaks to how the Ranked system worked.
12	Defiance	February 8, 2022 – May 10, 2022	A new legend named Mad Maggie was introduced, an old friend of Fuse, responsible for Season 8's map destruction and who briefly took over the Apex games. The season began with a three-week period of a limited time mode named "Control", a 9v9 mode where players held control points. Olympus was the map that also got an update. The season also arrived during the third anniversary, where players could obtain special packs based on various legends.
13	Saviors	May 10, 2022 – August 9, 2022	A new legend named Newcastle was introduced, known to be Bangalore's missing brother Jackson. Storm Point was the map that received a map update, where a sea creature, killed by all the legends, was incorporated into the map alongside new IMC bunkers, which could provide high tier loot. Ranked also received a rework, where it focused more on team play; points were granted to team players even if they didn't get the assist. Players could also fall out of ranks (Masters could rank down to Diamond I as an example).
14	Hunted	August 9, 2022 – November 1, 2022	A new legend named Vantage was introduced, who used abilities best suited for sniper players. King's Canyon was the map that received a "reforged" update, with Skull Town, now renamed to "Relic", making a return; various other locations around King's Canyon were aptly updated for better rotations. There was also a level cap increase, from level 500 to level 2000, where once a player reached 500, they could revert to level 1 and progress again.
15	Eclipse	November 1, 2022 – February 14, 2023	A new legend named Catalyst was introduced, who used ferrofluid to create structures at will. A new lunar map, Broken Moon, was released, which had a distinct feature of using zip rails to traverse across the map. Gifting was also added to allow players to purchase cosmetic items for their friends.
16	Revelry	February 14, 2023 – May 9, 2023	For the first time since the game launched, a new Legend was not introduced to the game this season, instead using this season to implement various changes with remastered classes and the introduction of an orientation match system. Whilst removing the Arena mode from the game, Team Deathmatch was made available as a new mode, which rotated out in a new permanent "Mixtape" playlist with Control and Gun Run. A brand new weapon called the Nemesis was added, and a rework was implemented of various legends and their classes.
17	Arsenal	May 9, 2023 – August 8, 2023	The seventeenth season of Apex Legends brought significant updates and changes to the game. World's Edge received a major map update, and Ballistic became a new legend that focused on weapon-based fighting. Players could also expect improvements to Ranked mode, as well as an overhaul of the Firing Range. A highly anticipated Weapon Progression system was added to the game that rewarded players with desirable items such as Legendary-rarity Banner Frames, weapon-based Stat Trackers and Badges, Loading Screens, and a Legendary weapon Apex Pack for completing special challenges. The weapon level remained the same even after seasons, as the progress did not reset. Another addition was the Evac Tower, which players could use to quickly escape danger.
18	Resurrection	August 8, 2023 – October 31, 2023	there was no introduction of a new Legend. Instead, Revenant, an existing Legend, underwent a complete rework of his abilities and appearance. Mixtape then offered Control, Team Deathmatch, and Gun Run maps on the Battle Royale map Broken Moon. The Control map was on Production Yard, while the TDM/Gun Run map was on Perpetual Core (or simply The Core). The season commenced with the Death Dynasty Collection Event, where the collection reward was a recolored heirloom for Revenant. Additionally, the Charge Rifle underwent major adjustments, with the removal of its pre-fire laser and hitscan features, transforming it into a projectile weapon with significantly enhanced damage.
19	Ignite	October 31, 2023 – February 13, 2024	Season 19 ushered in a new legend, named Conduit. In the new season, the Storm Point map got a partial rework to bring players a new combat experience. In Season 19, promotion trials were added to the ranking matches. When players reached the top of a certain rank, they entered the promotion trial state. During the trial, LP did not decrease or increase, allowing players to focus on completing the trial, and the pre-set rank gap limit was removed. Players could also play with friends regardless of their rank.
20	Breakout	February 13, 2024 – May 6, 2024	In this season, no new legends were added. However, major gameplay changes related to "Evo Shields" were made. Evo Shields were removed from the ground loot entirely, and the option to upgrade your shield via "replicators" was removed. Now, the "Shield Core" is automatically attached to your character at the beginning of a match, and will level up as the player deals damage or completes other tasks. Every new level adds a unique "upgrade" to each legend, expanding how their abilities work.
21	Upheaval	May 6, 2024 – August 6, 2024	A new legend, Alter, was added as a "Skirmisher." Also, the Broken Moon map was updated and changed. "Apex Artifacts," also referred to as "heirlooms," were changed, and a universal heirloom, one that could be used by each legend, was added. (Apex Legends Mobile previously had a universal heirloom, though these were not the same.)
22	Shockwave	August 6, 2024 – October 22, 2024	This season was the first to be divided into 2 splits, with the second starting on September 17, 2024. There were no new legends added, although the "E-District" map was added. Also, the ability to dual wield both the "Mozambique" and the "P2020," which is called "akimbo" in-game. Also, changes to the Battle Pass were made, which added a "Premium" and "Premium+" tier, which cannot be bought with Apex Coins, and cost $9.99 and $19.99 respectively.
23	Into The Rift	October 22, 2024 – February 11, 2025	This season added no new legends, but "revived" Lifeline similarly to the Revenant "revival" in Season 18. This gave her new abilities and expanded her base abilities. It also added the "Rift Relics" to the normal modes, which brought back versions of weapons from the first season of Apex Legends, as well as adding "Boost Kits" and the "EPG-1" from Titanfall and Titanfall 2. This season also added the Launch Royale LTM, which brought back the Season One version of the King's Canyon map.
24	Takeover	February 11, 2025 – May 6, 2025	This season significantly reduced the time to kill on all guns with a flat damage increase to most weapons, a reduction in the maximum shield attainable through EVO points, and removed headshot damage reduction entirely. Arsenal Stations were added to POIs which contained every gun for a specific weapon class. This season reworked the legend Ash to have a dash ability and buffed Ballistic to be more powerful. The Assault class received a buff initially, with the Skirmisher class receiving a buff in Split 2.
25	Prodigy	May 6, 2025 – present	

== Development ==
Developer Respawn Entertainment had previously developed Titanfall (2014) and its sequel Titanfall 2 (2016), both of which were published by Electronic Arts (EA) who eventually acquired Respawn Entertainment in 2017.

According to design director Mackey McCandlish, initial design on Apex Legends started before Titanfall 2 had shipped in 2016 and as of 2018 the entire Titanfall team at Respawn Entertainment was working on the project; however, executive producer Drew McCoy stated that work on the game did not begin until the spring of 2017. He also confirmed that the game had approximately 115 developers working on it, making it the studio's most labor-intensive project. Titanfall 2, by way of comparison, had around 85 developers.

According to McCoy, the studio was not sure what their next game would be after completing the post-release support for Titanfall 2, though they knew they wanted to keep making Titanfall games. As with the development of Titanfall 2, the studio broke into several small teams to create "action blocks", small game prototypes that showcase a gameplay element, a weapon, or similar feature of a game that would fit into a Titanfall sequel. One such "action block" was inspired by the success of the battle royale game genre led by PlayerUnknown's Battlegrounds; this prototype, which applied gameplay mechanics of previous Titanfall games in a battle royale format, was considered very successful and the studio decided to expand this model.

The designers decided that having the pilotable Titans (large mecha) from their previous games would not work well in a battle-royale setting and instead focused on creating strong character classes which felt appropriate for the Titanfall franchise. They also found that some maneuverability features of prior Titanfall titles, such as wall-running, would make gameplay too challenging in a battle royale format, as identifying the direction of threats would be too difficult.

Respawn Entertainment CEO Vince Zampella told VentureBeat that Apex Legends, as a live-service and free-to-play battle-royale game, was a new challenge for the studio and represented a new way for them of developing games. Their design philosophy was focused on "chasing the fun" and designing all the mechanics around team-based play, rather than solo play. The final decision on major design factors, such as the size of the teams, the number of teams and the size of the map, were all based on what felt "most fun" to the developers and were strongly guided by "gut feeling".

Design director Mackey McCandlish also stated that with Apex Legends, they were looking to challenge the conventions of the still relatively young battle-royale genre and to add their studio's unique touch to that class of games. They felt that the choice of three-man squads and a limit of 20 teams gave players on average a greater chance to win and also felt more in line with the type of intimate gameplay they were hoping to achieve. McCandlish claimed that the studio felt the need to create a "defensible space" in the battle-royale mode which could not be easily imitated and that the communication system, the three-man squads, and the smaller playing area were all aligned with this goal.

As part of the development process, the game underwent extensive play-testing to ensure that all elements felt fun and balanced. Collectively the developers spent 100 to 200 hours a day trying out the game, a process which executive producer Drew McCoy called "probably the most important part of development". To refine the game's non-verbal communication system, the studio play-tested the game for a month without the use of voice chat and applied fake names to the play-testers to predict how most players would experience the game.

With the game mostly completed, Respawn's director of brand marketing, Arturo Castro, began working on how the studio would name and market it. Castro recognized that the game featured many elements which players would expect from a Titanfall franchise game, but lacked core elements such as Titans, Pilots and a single-player experience. Additionally, it had already been reported that Respawn was working on Titanfall 3 from a source at the studio. Respawn therefore decided that attempting to market the game as part of the Titanfall series would have been difficult and would risk alienating Titanfall fans. They, therefore, opted to treat the game as a new intellectual property (IP).

Respawn were also concerned that as they at that time had recently been acquired by EA, players would think that EA had forced them to make a battle royale game. McCoy affirmed that they had to convince Electronic Arts to allow them to make this game: "we decided to make this game. Not to be throwing EA under the bus, but this wasn't the game they were expecting. I had to go to executives, show it to them, and explain it and...not convince but more, 'Hey, trust us! This is the thing you want out of us.' [...] This is a game where we had to say, 'This is what we want to do. Help us get there.'"

Concerned that a standard six-month marketing campaign for the game would have generated negative publicity from disgruntled Titanfall fans, Castro claims they eventually took inspiration from musical artist Beyoncé whose release of her self-titled album came as a surprise to fans—a strategy which proved financially successful. Wanting to generate some buzz about this new product before its release, the studio secretly arranged for about 100 social media influencers to travel to their studio to try the game and then instructed them to "tease" news of it on their social media accounts during halftime of the Super Bowl LIII, the day before Apex Legends' formal release.

Respawn CEO Vince Zampella felt the approach was "gross", according to Castro, as he found it reminiscent of the infamous Fyre Festival "hype" which later turned out to be a fraudulent event. However, as Apex Legends was already ready for release at this point, Castro felt the approach was an appropriate marketing strategy. Because of the game's performance in terms of player-count and viewership on streaming services, Castro felt vindicated in this decision. This approach was uncharacteristic of any prior EA title.

The game is built using a modified version of Source engine; Source had previously been used for Titanfall 2, however for Apex Legends several necessary adjustments to allow for the increased draw distances and the large game map were made. Apex Legends is believed to be pushing at the technological limits of its game engine and as a result, the game compromises on dynamic display resolution, with the quality of the image and frame rate suffering particularly on console versions and on lower-end PC devices.

Prior to launch, McCoy confirmed there were plans to implement cross-platform play to the game in the future, though claimed that game progression and in-game purchases cannot be transferred across systems due to hardware limitations. McCoy has also expressed the desire to eventually bring Apex Legends to iOS, Android, and Nintendo Switch.

According to anonymous reports, Tencent Games is working with Electronic Arts to bring Apex Legends to China, as partnering with a local Chinese firm is a requirement for Western media companies wishing to make their products legally available in the country. In January 2020, EA confirmed to investors that it was working with a local partner in order to bring the game to PC in China, though it did not mention the partner by name.

Respawn established a new Vancouver, British Columbia, studio, within the EA Vancouver campus, dedicated to supporting Apex Legends in May 2020.

As part of the June 2020 EA Play presentation, Respawn announced that Apex Legends would be brought to the Steam storefront for Windows players, as well as to the Nintendo Switch by late 2020. Further, the game would support cross-platform play across all supported platforms on these releases. Cross-platform play was introduced into the game with the Aftermarket Collection Event. In a blog post by Respawn in late October 2020, it was revealed that the Steam version will launch on November 4, the same day as the launch of season 7. However, the Nintendo Switch version was delayed to March 9, 2021. The Nintendo Switch version of Apex Legends was developed by Panic Button, known for their Switch ports of the DOOM series and Rocket League.

Electronic Arts also confirmed that mobile launches on iOS and Android were in development in collaboration with a Chinese mobile company. The mobile ports are set to release by the end of 2022. In April 2021, Electronic Arts announced that the mobile version of the game would be titled Apex Legends Mobile, and would begin beta testing in the coming months. In July 2021, Apex Legends was hacked by individuals wishing to draw attention to persistent problems with cheating in the Titanfall series that had been unaddressed by Electronic Arts and Respawn. Large banners pointed players of Apex Legends to a website outlining their concerns.

In February 2022, Respawn announced that a native version of Apex Legends for PlayStation 5 and Xbox Series X/S was "coming very soon..." and that it would introduce new features specifically for the next generation consoles. These versions were released on March 29, 2022.

Apex Legends Mobile released on May 17, 2022, for iOS and Android devices. The game was published by Electronic Arts and developed by Chinese company Lightspeed and Quantum Studios, a subsidiary of Tencent and the developer of PUBG Mobile. The game was shut down on May 1, 2023.

On January 30, 2026, Respawn announced that the Nintendo Switch version would be discontinued following the end of Season 29.

=== Esports ===
Shortly after Apex Legends' launch, it was seen as a potential esport competition, and Respawn had anticipated establishing events once the game had been established. As early as March 2019, various esport team sponsors began to assemble Apex Legends teams for these competitions. ESPN launched its EXP program to showcase esports events running alongside other ESPN-managed sporting events. The first such event was the EXP Pro-Am Apex Legends Exhibition, run on July 11, 2019, alongside the 2019 ESPY Awards. An EXP Invitational event with a $150,000 prize pool took place alongside the X Games Minneapolis 2019 from August 1 to 4, 2019. However, as a result of the El Paso and Dayton mass shootings that occurred over that weekend, both ESPN and ABC opted to delay broadcast of the event out of respect for the victims of the shootings.

Respawn and EA announced the Apex Legends Global Series in December 2019, consisting of several online events and twelve live events during 2020 with a total US$3 million prize pool. The Global Series follows a similar approach as Fortnite Battle Royale by using multiple tiers of events to qualify players. Players will qualify for the Global Series through Online Tournaments. Top players and teams from these events will be invited to either regional Challenger events or to global Premier events, where the winners have a chance for a cash payout and invitations to one of the three major events. Three Major events will be held for one hundred teams to accumulate points in the Global Series to vie for placement in the final Major event as well as part of a US$500,000 prize pool. The fourth Major event had up to sixty teams competing for a portion of a US$1 million pool.

Year 2 of the ALGS began in September 2021.

Year 3 of the ALGS began on July 7, 2022, consisting of 40 teams around the world with a total US$2 million prize pool. The first place belongs to Darkzero Esports, with the prize of US$500,000.

== Reception ==
Reception

Aggregate score
Aggregator	Score
Metacritic	PC: 88/100; PS4: 89/100; XONE: 88/100; NS: 54/100; IOS: 79/100

Review scores
Publication	Score
Destructoid	8.5/10
Game Informer	9.25/10
GameSpot	PC: 9/10; IOS: 7/10
GamesRadar+	PC/PS4: 5/5
IGN	PC: 9/10; IOS: 8/10
Jeuxvideo.com	17/20
PC Gamer (US)	93/100
The Guardian	4/5

Apex Legends received "generally favorable" reviews for most platforms according to review aggregator website Metacritic; the Nintendo Switch version received "mixed or average" reviews. Some publications, including Destructoid, Game Informer, GamesRadar+, and PC Gamer, called it one of the best takes on the battle royale genre thus far, and a worthy challenger to Fortnite Battle Royale's dominance of the genre.

Critics lauded the combat in Apex Legends. Destructoid referred to the gunplay as the best they had experienced in a battle royale thus far; however, they felt let down that some of the mechanics from the previous Titanfall games were not present. Javy Gwaltney of Game Informer, on the other hand, claimed that the omission of the Titans and other elements from previous Respawn games was not a problem and found the combat to be satisfying and the gunplay powerful. He added that the addition of heroes can make for more exciting combat than in other battle royale games.

Reviewers praised the non-verbal communication system in the game (known as the "ping system") with most considering it to be highly innovative. Polygon's Khee Hoon Chan opined that it "rendered voice chat with strangers largely unnecessary", and was emblematic of Apex Legends' accessibility and astuteness. Destructoid likewise enjoyed the mechanic, predicting that it would become the new norm for the video games industry in battle royale games. Rock Paper Shotgun called it the "gold standard for non-verbal communication in games" and noted that, while not an entirely new concept, Respawn Entertainment had refined the idea.

While Electronic Arts had received a U.S. patent for the ping system in 2021, the company announced that the ping system patent and four others related to game accessibility would be made available for free to game developers to use without fear of litigation starting in August 2021. IGN awarded the game score of 9 out of 10, summing up the review by saying "Apex Legends is squad-based battle royale done right, complete with cool heroes, a superb communication system, and polished mechanics"

Apex Legends received critical praise for the perceived diversity of its playable characters. Several characters are LGBTQ, including one non-binary character, though some reviewers felt that the nature of the game did not allow for a narrative which properly highlights this diversity.

=== Awards ===
Year	Award	Category	Result	Ref.
2019	Japan Game Awards	Award for Excellence	Won	
2019	2019 Golden Joystick Awards	Best Multiplayer	Won	
2019	2019 Golden Joystick Awards	Ultimate Game of the Year	Nominated	
2019	The Game Awards 2019	Best Ongoing Game	Nominated	
2019	The Game Awards 2019	Best Community Support	Nominated	
2019	The Game Awards 2019	Best Action Game	Nominated	
2019	The Game Awards 2019	Best Multiplayer Game	Won	
2020	Visual Effects Society Awards	Outstanding Animated Character in a Commercial (Meltdown and Mirage)	Nominated	
2020	23rd Annual D.I.C.E. Awards	Online Game of the Year	Won	
2020	NAVGTR Awards	Costume Design	Nominated	
2020	NAVGTR Awards	Gameplay Design, New IP	Nominated	
2020	NAVGTR Awards	Game, Original Action	Nominated	
2020	Pégases Awards 2020	Best International Game	Nominated	
2020	Game Developers Choice Awards	Best Technology	Nominated	
2020	SXSW Gaming Awards	Trending Game of the Year	Nominated	
2020	SXSW Gaming Awards	Excellence in Animation	Nominated	
2020	SXSW Gaming Awards	Excellence in Multiplayer	Nominated	
2020	16th British Academy Games Awards	Evolving Game	Nominated	
2020	16th British Academy Games Awards	Multiplayer	Won	
2020	Famitsu Dengeki Game Awards 2019	Best Online Game	Nominated	
2020	Famitsu Dengeki Game Awards 2019	Best Shooter	Won	
2020	18th Annual G.A.N.G. Awards	Best Audio Mix	Nominated	
2020	GLAAD Media Awards	Outstanding Video Game	Nominated	
2020	The Game Awards 2020	Best Ongoing Game	Nominated	
2020	The Game Awards 2020	Best Community Support	Nominated	
2020	Steam Awards 2020	Best Game You Suck At	Won	
2021	The Game Awards 2021	Best Ongoing Game	Nominated	
2021	The Game Awards 2021	Best Community Support	Nominated	
2021	The Streamer Awards	Stream Game of the Year	Nominated	
2023	British Academy Games Awards	Evolving Game	Nominated	
2025	Golden Joystick Awards	Still Playing Award - PC and Console	Nominated	

=== Player-count and revenue ===
Eight hours after its launch, Apex Legends surpassed one million unique players, and reached 2.5 million unique players within 24 hours. In one week it achieved a total of 25 million players, with over 2 million peak concurrent, and by the end of its first month it reached 50 million players in total.

Within the first month of its release, Apex Legends made $92 million in revenue across all platforms, the highest amount earned by any free-to-play game during its month of launch.

As news and popularity of Apex Legends spread, analysts saw the game as something to challenge the dominance of Fortnite Battle Royale, and by February 8, 2019—four days after the game's release—EA had seen its largest growth in stock value since 2014 on the basis of Apex Legends' sudden success. Throughout April, the game was estimated to have earned $24 million in revenue, representing 74 percent less than the amount it earned during its first month, as the game failed to sustain the same level of interest generated by its launch.

In July 2019, EA told investors that the game had 8 to 10 million players a week and also credited Apex Legends with the company's recent upturn in live services earnings as their Q1 2020 financial results exceeded expectations. With the release of season 3 in October, Apex Legends reached a playerbase of 70 million people internationally and is believed to have earned $45 million in that month alone.

In February 2021, EA's CFO, Blake Jorgensen, confirmed that Apex Legends has surpassed $1 billion in revenue. In April, right before the release of the game's 9th season, Respawn announced that Apex Legends had reached a playerbase of over 100 million people and was expected to pull in $500 million that year.

In May 2022, it was stated in EA's earnings call that Apex Legends had surpassed $2 billion in revenue. On August 11, the game broke its all-time record for number of concurrent players on Steam with 510,286, according to stat-tracking database Steamcharts.

From February to December 2024, the game lost 70% of its Steam playerbase, potentially indicating waning interest. On an earnings call, EA noted that revenue had declined during 2024, and expectations needed to be adjusted downwards as a result.

=== Controversies ===
With the introduction of the 'Iron Crown' limited-time event in August 2019, the developers released several purchasable in-game cosmetic items. The vast majority of these items could only be acquired through purchasing loot boxes, and the most sought-after item (a cosmetic axe for one of the player characters) could only be purchased at an additional cost after first having obtained 24 other purchasable items. Players and media outlets decried that as a result of this transaction model, the cost of the most sought-after item was approximately $170 (or £130)—a price point which Forbes called "hilariously out of touch" and compared negatively to most other major microtransaction models in the industry.

This resulted in a negative backlash from the player community and industry journalists, particularly on Reddit, where members of the Apex Legends community forum traded insults with developers of the game with the increasingly strong language being used by both parties.

As a result, Respawn Entertainment apologized for what they agreed was unfair monetization and promised to allow players the chance to purchase cosmetic items directly (rather than rely on loot boxes), albeit at an increased price. Respawn Entertainment CEO Vince Zampella later apologized for members of the development team "crossing a line with their comments", while also defending that they stood up for themselves against alleged death threats and insults aimed at their family members.

Around July 4, 2021, unknown agents appeared to have broken EA and Respawn's server security as to change in-game messages to point to a website that purportedly was trying to "Save Titanfall". The site and messages spoke of the weak security that both Titanfall and Titanfall 2 servers had, leading to the games becoming unplayable due to the number of other hackers using denial of service attacks to bring down the servers. A community-led investigation determined that the owners of the website were directly involved in hacking the Apex servers and were also behind some of the denial attacks on the Titanfall servers as a type of false flag, to get Respawn to bring back the cancelled Titanfall Online game.

The 'Monsters Within' event released on October 12, 2021, as the 2021 Halloween Event. People were upset when it was announced because the event was not launching with the Shadow Royale gamemode, and it was instead only going to be available for the final week of the event. There was also controversy over the way that Respawn sold the event skins, as players could not buy them by themselves. People were also upset because the game was in a state of constant crashes and many game breaking bugs.

== Spinoff media ==
In February 2023, it was announced that Apex Legends: The Board Game would begin a crowdfunding campaign on Kickstarter on May 17. The crowdfunding campaign launched as planned, reaching its goal in just seven hours. The game is being developed by Glass Cannon Unplugged, and features team-based skirmish battles for up to four players.
