= John Ash (MP for Totnes) =

English politician

John Ash (fl. 1420–1439) was an English politician.

He was a member (MP) of the parliament of England for Totnes in 1420 and for Middlesex in 1433 and 1439.
