= Victor Ash =

Victor Ash may refer to:

- Vic Ash (1930–2014), English jazz saxophonist and clarinetist
- Victor Ash (artist) (born 1968), French contemporary artist
- Victor Ashe (born 1945), United States Ambassador to Poland
