= Quenton Ashlyn =

- Quenton Ashlyn, 1905.
- Born: Frank Kennedy; 19 November 1858; London, England
- Died: 5 January 1933 (aged 74); Surrey, Epsom
- Other name: J. Quenton Ashlyn
- Occupation: Music hall singer

J. Quenton Ashlyn (19 November 1858 - 5 January 1933) was the pseudonym of society entertainer Frank Kennedy.

In his autobiography, The Mighty God and a Sinner, Kennedy describes his natural talent for music and that the concert hall and theatre greatly fascinated him. Before his entertainment career he was employed in clerical duties on a Royal Commission, but he became so successful as a society entertainer that he abandoned government service.

He composed humorous songs which achieved popularity and a wide circulation. One of his works that is still popular is 'The Bassoon', which is still played today. It also has been professionally recorded in 'The Playful Pachyderm: Classic Miniatures for Bassoon and Orchestra', with Laurence Perkins as the bassoonist.

He attended the Torrey-Alexander revival meetings at the Royal Albert Hall, London in 1905, after which he gave up the theatre life and lived as a devout Christian. This was not a rash decision. He grew tired of playing a fool and being laughed at. He was also miserable during his stage years. Giving up the stage as well as giving up drinking, smoking, and billiards greatly improved his mood. His choice was greatly influenced by his Christian mother, who grew up in the London slums. She spoke greatly of her joy, which he never understood until following her lifestyle.

He stayed out the limelight until he died in 1933, at the age of 74, under circumstances not known.
