= Titanfall =

Media franchise

- Genre: First-person shooter
- Developer: Respawn Entertainment
- Publisher: Electronic Arts
- Platforms: Xbox 360, Xbox One, Xbox Series X/S, Microsoft Windows, PlayStation 4, PlayStation 5, iOS, Android
- First release: Titanfall; March 11, 2014
- Latest release: Titanfall 2 October 28, 2016

Titanfall is a video game franchise, focusing on first-person shooter games in a shared science fiction universe. The series was created by Respawn Entertainment and debuted on Xbox and Microsoft Windows; it has expanded to other consoles and platforms.

== Gameplay ==
In Titanfall, players control "Pilots" and their mech-style Titans, and fight in six-on-six matches set in the war-torn outer space colonies of the Frontier. The game is optimized for fast-paced, continual action, aided by wall-running abilities and populations of computer-controlled soldiers. Other titles in the series include unique characters who are able to use special abilities.

== Games ==
Release timeline
2014	Titanfall
2015
2016	Titanfall 2
2017	Titanfall: Assault

=== Main series ===
==== Titanfall ====
Titanfall, the first game in the series, was released for Xbox One and Microsoft Windows on March 11, 2014. On April 8, 2014, it released for Xbox 360. The game was mainly multiplayer focused with no real single-player campaign included. Instead, there was a single-player tutorial included that served as a way for the player to learn the mechanics of the game.

==== Titanfall 2 ====
Titanfall 2 was released on October 28, 2016, for the Xbox One, PlayStation 4, and Microsoft Windows. This time, the game included a single-player campaign with a full-fledged story. Many of the mechanics from Titanfall returned, including maps in multiplayer. The game received several free updates after its launch, including a returning multiplayer mode known as Frontier Defense. The level "Effect and Cause" in particular was well received.

=== Spin-offs ===
==== Titanfall: Assault ====
Titanfall: Assault was a top-down real-time strategy game for mobile platforms in the style of Clash Royale. It was developed by Particle City and Respawn Entertainment, published by Nexon, and released for iOS and Android in August 2017. All servers for Titanfall: Assault were shut down on July 30, 2018. On July 31, 2018, Titanfall: Assault was removed from Google Play shortly after the servers were shut down.

=== Cancelled ===
==== Titanfall: Frontline ====
Titanfall: Frontline was a collectible card game that was played in real-time. The player collects and places Pilot, Titan, and burn cards to damage and defeat their opponent. Pilot and Titan cards can combine to perform extra damage. In January 2017, Titanfall: Frontline was cancelled.

==== Titanfall Online ====
In 2016, EA announced that it was partnering with Nexon to create an Asian market-specific version of Titanfall called Titanfall Online, similar to Counter-Strike Online and Call of Duty Online. This version was based on the first Titanfall rather than its sequel, with some slight differences like four main pilots in the game, the introduction of a new titan, and a new map. Titanfall Online had a closed beta in 2017. Titanfall Online was cancelled on July 9, 2018, primarily due to poor reception during testing and a changing market.

==== Unannounced Titanfall/Apex Legends single-player crossover ====
On 2 February 2023, rumored single-player Titanfall and Apex Legends game codenamed TFL (short for Titanfall Legends) was cancelled prior to any public announcement.

==== Unannounced Titanfall extraction shooter ====
A Titanfall project codenamed "R7" was cancelled in April 2025. According to people familiar with the project, the game had been in an early stage, and was developed by Respawn Entertainment.

== Development ==
Titanfall is the first game developed by Respawn Entertainment, a developer founded by Jason West and Vince Zampella. As ex-employees of Infinity Ward, they helped create the Call of Duty franchise. The two were fired after contract disputes.
