= Respawn Entertainment =

American video game developer

Respawn Entertainment, LLC
- Type: Subsidiary
- Industry: Video games
- Founded: April 12, 2010; 16 years ago
- Founders: Jason West; Vince Zampella
- Headquarters: Los Angeles, California, U.S.
- Number of locations: 3 (2023)
- Area served: Worldwide
- Products: Titanfall series Apex Legends; Star Wars Jedi: Fallen Order; Medal of Honor: Above and Beyond; Star Wars Jedi: Survivor
- Number of employees: 315 (2019)
- Parent: Electronic Arts (2017–present)
- Subsidiaries: Respawn Entertainment Vancouver; Respawn Entertainment Wisconsin
- Website: respawn.com

Respawn Entertainment, LLC is an American video game development studio founded in 2010 by Jason West and Vince Zampella and owned by Electronic Arts since 2017. West and Zampella previously co-founded Infinity Ward and created the Call of Duty franchise, where they were responsible for its development until 2010.

Respawn's debut game, the first-person shooter Titanfall, was released in 2014. On December 1, 2017, the studio was acquired by EA. Its first game since the acquisition was the free-to-play Apex Legends, released on February 4, 2019, followed by Star Wars Jedi: Fallen Order, released in November of that year. Respawn developed Medal of Honor: Above and Beyond, which included in its bonus features the Academy Award-winning short documentary Colette.

== History ==
Jason West and Vince Zampella had been leads at Infinity Ward, a subsidiary of Activision founded in 2002. Infinity Ward was a principal studio on the Call of Duty series, and in 2007, released Call of Duty 4: Modern Warfare, a critical success for the series. West and Zampella leveraged the success of Modern Warfare to renegotiate their contracts with Activision in 2008, asking for large bonuses and creative control of the series in exchange for releasing Call of Duty: Modern Warfare 2 in 2009, which Activision agreed to on the condition that the control would revert to Activision if the pair were fired. From that point, Activision sought ways to trigger that clause, and West and Zampella looked for ways to make Infinity Ward independent. Events came to a head in March 2010 when the two were fired from Activision, forfeiting their bonuses. Several lawsuits followed, with West and Zampella accusing Activision of unpaid bonuses while Activision countersued that the two had conspired with Electronic Arts (EA) to damage Infinity Ward, but these suits were ultimately settled out of court.

In April 2010, a month after their release from Activision, West and Zampella set off to form a new independent studio, Respawn Entertainment. They sought funding from EA through the EA Partners Program. West and Zampella would retain the rights to all intellectual property produced by them in the future. As of July 10, 2010, 38 of the 46 Infinity Ward employees who resigned from that studio following the firings of West and Zampella revealed through their LinkedIn and Facebook profiles that they had signed on with Respawn Entertainment.

EA Games Label president Frank Gibeau revealed at E3 2011 in June 2011 that Respawn Entertainment's EA-published shooter was "sci-fi oriented" and would allow the publisher to "compete with things like Gears and Halo". Gibeau also stated that EA would release Respawn's project when it saw an "opportunistic" window. Later that month, Respawn released a blurry teaser image of its unannounced game via the official website launched that day. Respawn further released another blurry image, and teased the new game with mo-cap shot. West left the company in March 2013, with Zampella saying that his departure was "to take care of some family issues". The following month, Respawn registered a trademark for the name Titan, and it was reported that Respawn's game was an always-online Xbox exclusive, although nothing had been confirmed.

In June 2013, Respawn Entertainment debuted Titanfall at E3. On October 22, it revealed the release date of the game to be March 11, 2014, in North America, and March 13 in Europe. In March 2015, it was announced that Respawn was developing a sequel, Titanfall 2, which was later released on October 28, 2016.

In June 2014, it was announced that Stig Asmussen, who previously worked for Santa Monica Studio on the God of War series, had joined the studio as game director of a second project that had nothing to do with Titanfall. From job listings in January 2016, it was found that the project was to be a third person action-adventure game. On May 4, 2016 – Star Wars Day – Asmussen announced Respawn Entertainment was making a third-person Star Wars game, later revealed to be Star Wars Jedi: Fallen Order at E3 2018.

In October 2017, it was announced that Respawn Entertainment was developing a virtual reality first person shooter title for the Oculus Rift, which was formally revealed as Medal of Honor: Above and Beyond in September 2019.

In November 2017, Electronic Arts acquired the company for US$151 million in cash and up to US$164 million in equity. The acquisition was completed on December 1, 2017.

In February 2019, Respawn Entertainment debuted Apex Legends via YouTube livestream. This debut had no prior announcement or marketing. The game was released the same day as the livestream on February 4, 2019. Later that year, the studio released the single-player Star Wars Jedi: Fallen Order.

On its tenth anniversary, Respawn announced it was opening a new studio in Vancouver, British Columbia, to focus on ongoing development of Apex Legends. The studio is located on the EA Vancouver campus as to be able to tap into its resources.

Zampella left Respawn in December 2021 to pursue development on future entries in the Battlefield series.

On January 25, 2022, it was announced that Respawn was developing a sequel to Jedi Fallen Order alongside an original Star Wars FPS and a strategy game. Peter Hirshmann would direct the FPS and Bit Reactor would co-develop the strategy game.

On March 20, 2023, Respawn announced it was opening a third studio to keep Apex Legends going for "10 to 15 years", this time in Madison, Wisconsin with Call of Duty veteran Ryan Burnett to lead the company in that branch. Prior to his previous position at Epic Games as director of engine production, Burnett spent 14 years at Call of Duty studio Raven Software – just one of the major studios based in the area. The following month, the sequel to Jedi: Fallen Order, Star Wars Jedi: Survivor, was released.

In September 2023, it was announced that Asmussen had left Respawn to pursue other creative endeavors. In March 2024, "around two dozen" Respawn employees were laid off as part of EA's previously announced effort to cut 5% of its global workforce. It was also announced that the Star Wars FPS Respawn was developing had been canceled, with the fate of the strategy game being unclear. Approximately 100 employees were moved to other projects or laid off and two projects were cancelled in April 2025.

Bit Reactor's Star Wars strategy game was announced at Star Wars Celebration in April 2025 as Star Wars Zero Company.

On December 21, 2025, Zampella died in a one-vehicle car crash in Los Angeles County, California at the age of 56.

By October 2026, Respawn was working with DICE on a sequel to Star Wars Battlefront II titled Star Wars Battlefront III.

== Colette ==
Colette is a 24-minute short film directed by Anthony Giacchino that was produced for inclusion in Medal of Honor: Above and Beyond as an installment in its Gallery series of short documentaries. The film follows former French Resistance member Colette Marin-Catherine as she travels to Germany for the first time in 74 years to visit the Mittelbau-Dora concentration camp where her brother died at the hands of the Nazis.

Of the Gallery shorts, Colette garnered particular recognition for its cinematic value. Respawn and Oculus submitted it to various film festivals, including the Big Sky Documentary Film Festival where it won the award for Best Short, making it eligible for submission to the American Academy of Motion Picture Arts and Sciences for awards consideration. Subsequently, Colette was nominated for and won the Academy Award for Best Documentary Short Subject at the 93rd Academy Awards, making the short the first production by a video game company to win an Oscar.

== Games developed ==
Year	Title	Platform(s)	Notes
2014	Titanfall	Microsoft Windows, Xbox 360, Xbox One	
2016	Titanfall 2	Microsoft Windows, PlayStation 4, Xbox One	
2017	Titanfall: Assault	Android, iOS	Co-developed with Particle City
2019	Apex Legends	Microsoft Windows, Nintendo Switch, PlayStation 4, PlayStation 5, Xbox One, Xbox Series X/S	The Nintendo Switch version was co-developed by Panic Button
2019	Star Wars Jedi: Fallen Order	Microsoft Windows, PlayStation 4, PlayStation 5, Stadia, Xbox One, Xbox Series X/S	The PlayStation 5 and Xbox Series X/S versions were co-developed by Panic Button
2020	Medal of Honor: Above and Beyond	Microsoft Windows, Meta Quest	
2023	Star Wars Jedi: Survivor	Microsoft Windows, PlayStation 4, PlayStation 5, Xbox One, Xbox Series X/S	
2026	Star Wars Zero Company	Microsoft Windows, PlayStation 5, Xbox Series X/S	Developed by Bit Reactor
TBA	Untitled Star Wars Jedi: Survivor sequel	TBA	

=== Canceled ===
Year	Title	Ref.
2024	Untitled Star Wars first-person shooter game	
2025	Untitled video game	
2025	Untitled video game	
