= Cal Kestis =

Fictional character in Star Wars

- Star Wars Jedi character
- Cal Kestis from Star Wars Jedi: Fallen Order
- First appearance: Star Wars Jedi: Fallen Order (2019)
- Portrayed by: Cameron Monaghan
- Voiced by: Cameron Monaghan

In-universe information
- Occupation: Jedi Knight
- Affiliation: Jedi Order
- Masters: Jaro Tapal; Cere Junda

Cal Kestis is a fictional character in the Star Wars franchise. He is the playable protagonist of the Star Wars Jedi game series developed by Respawn Entertainment, which includes the 2019 video game Star Wars Jedi: Fallen Order and its 2023 sequel, Star Wars Jedi: Survivor. The character has also appeared in other media of the franchise, such as the novel Star Wars Jedi: Battle Scars by Sam Maggs, which bridges the gap between the two Star Wars Jedi games. Cal is played by American actor and model Cameron Monaghan through performance capture.

Within the franchise, Cal is a former Jedi Padawan and survivor of the Great Jedi Purge who, during the early reign of the Galactic Empire, lives in seclusion on the planet Bracca until an incident forces him to reveal his Force powers. Pursued throughout the galaxy by Inquisitors, the Empire's Jedi hunters, Cal embarks on a quest to rebuild the Jedi Order as he is joined by a number of unlikely allies, who help him challenge the Empire's rule and become a second family to him. During his journey, Cal learns to re-embrace his Jedi role and reconcile with his troubled past, as he goes on to become a powerful Jedi Knight and a prominent figure in the fight against the Empire.

Cal's character has received a generally positive reception from critics and fans, who praised his growth and relationships with other characters, although he did face some initial criticism over his "boring" appearance in the first game.

== Development and design ==
Cameron Monaghan provides both the voice and likeness for Cal Kestis' character, including his natural red hair. Respawn Entertainment captured his physique through motion capture. On playing the part of Cal, he said "It's pretty surreal to see a character that you built and got to explore and imagine. It's a character that I've really grown to love". He also stated, "It's such a privilege to be able to play something that has a storied history behind it, but also something that I'm a fan of and have always wanted to be part of since I was a kid". The actor "didn't want to model Cal on any specific Star Wars character", adding "I wanted Cal's personality and demeanor and everything to come out of his own experiences and his own stories, and to build it from an inward place".

During his audition process for the game, Monaghan wasn't told that he was auditioning for a Star Wars game. "At that point I didn't know I was auditioning for a Star Wars game, but I kinda knew. They made these fake audition pages and stuff, and I was kinda reading it like 'hmmm ... This is Star Wars, isn't it?' They were like 'No, of course not.' So when I got into the room and they gave me the toy lightsaber, I was like 'I knew it!'"

Before the developers knew who Cal Kestis was going to be, there were several different concepts. The director of the game Stig Asmussen revealed "We talked about doing an alien character, we talked about doing a different gender, but we arrived at where we were because at the time, Rey was kind of the thing for Star Wars, so it made a lot more sense for us to have a male protagonist".

== Appearances ==
=== Video games ===
==== Jedi: Fallen Order ====
Cal is the protagonist of the video game Star Wars Jedi: Fallen Order (2019), set five years after the rise of the Galactic Empire and the Great Jedi Purge. His backstory is explored in a flashback that occurs later in the game, which reveals that Cal was a Jedi Padawan training under Jedi Master Jaro Tapal during the Clone Wars. When Order 66 was issued at the end of the war, Tapal sacrificed himself to save Cal from their former clone troopers, leaving the latter guilt-ridden and causing him to sever his connection to the Force.

While working as a scrapper on the planet Bracca, trying to hide his identity from the Empire, Cal uses the Force to rescue his friend Prauf during a work accident, exposing him as a Jedi to the Empire, which subsequently dispatches two Inquisitors, the Second Sister and the Ninth Sister, to capture him. Cal escapes with the help of Cere Junda, a former Jedi Knight-turned-mercenary, and her partner and friend Greez Dritus, who allow him to take refuge on their ship, the Stinger Mantis. Since Cere has cut herself from the Force after a brush with the Dark Side, Cal is recruited to retrieve a Holocron hidden away by Cere's former Jedi Master, Eno Cordova, which contains a list of Force-sensitive children around the galaxy that could be trained as Jedi, allowing the Order to be rebuilt.

During his journey, Cal is joined by several other allies, such as Cordova's former droid BD-1 and Nightsister Merrin, who survived the massacre of her clan on Dathomir, and is relentlessly pursued by the Second Sister, revealed to be Trilla Suduri, Cere's former Padawan who fell to the Dark Side after Cere betrayed her location to the Empire while under torture. Cal also comes into conflict with other Imperial forces, the Haxion Brood crime syndicate, and fallen Jedi Taron Malicos, who took control of Dathomir and seeks to learn the Nightsisters' magic. Cal initially struggles with re-embracing his Jedi role due to the guilt he still feels for Tapal's death, but is eventually able to overcome it, inspiring Cere to also become a Jedi once more and knight Cal.

After finding the Holocron, Trilla steals it and takes it to the Fortress Inquisitorius on Mustafar's oceanic moon Nur. Cal joins Cere in storming the base and confronting Trilla, whom Cal defeats. Cere then attempts to reconcile with her former Padawan, but Darth Vader appears and executes Trilla for failing him. Unable to defeat Vader, Cal and Cere barely escape from his grasp and return to the Mantis, where they realize that the children listed on the Holocron will only be in more danger if they become Jedi. Choosing to leave their fates to the will of the Force, Cal destroys the Holocron and prepares for the next adventure with his crew.

==== Jedi: Survivor ====
Cal returns as the protagonist of Star Wars Jedi: Survivor (2023), set five years after Fallen Order. In the time gap between the two games, he and the Mantis crew have split up, with Cal currently working with Saw Gerrera in missions against the Empire. During one such mission, Cal met and befriended mercenary Bode Akuna, recruiting him to the Mantis crew. Whilst recovering from a mission to Coruscant gone wrong, Cal discovers ruins from the High Republic era and information on a lost world called Tanalorr, which could serve as a safe haven against the Empire. Cal's search brings him into conflict with Dagan Gera, a fallen Jedi who discovered Tanalorr, and his allies in the Bedlam Raiders, a marauder group led by the Gen'Dai Rayvis. Cal reunites with his former crew to aid him in his quest, while also helping Cere and Cordova protect the Hidden Path.

After defeating Rayvis and Gera and recovering a compass that can be used to reach Tanalorr, Cal and the Hidden Path are betrayed by Bode, who kills Cordova and is revealed to be a fallen Jedi in hiding. Bode escapes before the Empire launches a raid to wipe out the Hidden Path, during which Cere is killed by Darth Vader. Cal, overcome with grief, begins to succumb to the Dark Side and follows Bode and his daughter Kata to Tanalorr, where he fights the former with Merrin's help. Cal is forced to tap into the Dark Side to defeat Bode, and reluctantly kills him when he attacks Merrin. After giving Cere, Bode, and Cordova funerals, Cal is contacted by Cere's Force spirit and vows to take care of Kata. He and the crew then decide to contact the Hidden Path and help them relocate to Tanalorr.

==== Galaxy of Heroes ====
In 2025, Cal Kestis was added as a playable character to the mobile game Star Wars: Galaxy of Heroes.

=== Television ===
==== Lego Star Wars: Rebuild the Galaxy ====
Cal Kestis appears in Lego Star Wars: Rebuild the Galaxy, reprised by Cameron Monaghan.

=== Novels ===
A younger Cal Kestis makes a cameo appearance in the novel Star Wars: Brotherhood (2022) by Mike Chen. Cal is also the protagonist of Star Wars Jedi: Battle Scars (2023) by Sam Maggs, which is set between the events of Star Wars Jedi: Fallen Order and Star Wars Jedi: Survivor and bridges the narrative gap between the two games.

=== Toys ===
In addition to there being several collectible action figures of Cal, Lego announced that a minifigure of the character would be included in a 2024 Imperial Star Destroyer set to commemorate the 25th anniversary of the Star Wars LEGO product line. The set was released on August 1, 2024.

== Critical reception ==
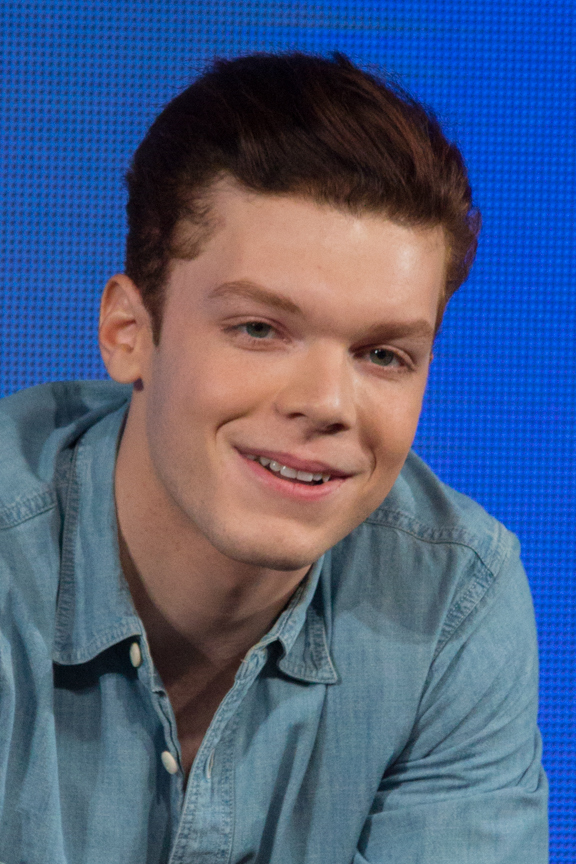
Cameron Monaghan's performance as Cal Kestis received praise.

Cal Kestis' character was generally well-received, although some expressed dissatisfaction that the final design of the character was "generic" or "dorky". Elijah Beahm from The Escapist criticized the depiction of Cal's reactions to the deaths of key characters, as well as Cal's role in the wiping out of an ethnic tribe of Dathomirians, arguing that his more muted response makes him unsympathetic as a heroic protagonist. Beahm argued "For all the ancient temples Cal visits and the other Force sensitives he speaks to, the best he can do is murder Stormtroopers. He's not a keeper of the peace; he's a soldier and a betrayer of what the Jedi should be." This sentiment was also expressed by Jack Packard from The Escapist. Conversely, Nick Calandra from The Escapist defended the character, saying "Cal learning to control his emotions and work through his trauma provides an infinitely more interesting character than he would have been had he just "followed" the Jedi way without truly understanding what it means. Once Cal finally stops fighting the past, sheathes his lightsaber, and promises to honor the teachings of his former master, only then does he become knighted as a Jedi."

Alani Vargas from CheatSheet also stated that Cal Kestis is "a great choice for the main character". Some reviewers noted that while he does not start off strong, the good writing, interesting cast of supporting characters, and the entertaining story help the player connect with Cal. The actor spoke out against criticism about his red hair, after players made mods to change the color of Cal's hair.

IGN named Cal Kestis one of the best video game characters of 2019, with staff member Matthew Adler highlighting his growth in power as well as his "down-to-earth personality and willingness to seek change". In 2020, Cal was ranked 50th in a "Best Star Wars character of All Time" fan poll organized by IGN.
