= Star Wars Jedi: Survivor =

2023 video game

- Developer: Respawn Entertainment
- Publisher: Electronic Arts
- Director: Stig Asmussen
- Producer: Paul Hatfield
- Designers: Jason de Heras; Jeff Magers
- Programmer: Jon Carr
- Artists: Chris Sutton; Nate Stephens
- Writers: Aaron Contreras; Danny Homan; Pete Stewart; Cheyenne Morrin
- Composers: Stephen Barton; Gordy Haab
- Series: Star Wars Jedi
- Engine: Unreal Engine 4
- Platforms: PlayStation 5; Windows; Xbox Series X/S; PlayStation 4; Xbox One
- Release: PS5, PC, Xbox Series X/S; April 28, 2023; PS4, Xbox One; September 17, 2024
- Genre: Action-adventure
- Mode: Single-player

Star Wars Jedi: Survivor is a 2023 action-adventure game developed by Respawn Entertainment and published by Electronic Arts. It is the sequel to Star Wars Jedi: Fallen Order (2019), taking place five years after the events of the previous game, and continues the adventure of young Jedi Knight Cal Kestis (Cameron Monaghan) as he and his friends struggle to survive the tyranny of the Galactic Empire while racing against a corrupted High Republic Jedi to reach a shrouded planet that can serve as a safe haven for those oppressed by the Empire. As with its predecessor, Survivor's structure was inspired by Metroidvania games, with gameplay split between combating hostile enemies using Cal's lightsaber and Force powers, platforming, and puzzle-solving.

Development of the game began in late 2019 and lasted for three and a half years, with Stig Asmussen returning as the game's director. It was the last game released by EA during its 10-year exclusivity contract with Lucasfilm to produce Star Wars games. With the sequel, the team's goal was to significantly expand its scope and scale, refining mechanics established in Fallen Order while introducing new gameplay features such as AI-controlled companions. The team collaborated closely with Lucasfilm while writing the game's narrative, which had a significantly darker tone than Fallen Order. In Survivor, Cal grapples with the futility of the rebellion and the dominance of the Empire while facing several antagonists that serve as foils.

Announced in May 2022, Star Wars Jedi: Survivor was released for PlayStation 5, Windows, and Xbox Series X/S on April 28, 2023. Versions for PlayStation 4 and Xbox One were released on September 17, 2024. The game was met with positive reviews from critics, who praised the characters, combat, level design, and music, with most deeming it an improvement over its predecessor. The PC version of the game, however, was criticized for its technical issues. It was a commercial success for EA, and was nominated for multiple year-end awards, including Best Action/Adventure Game at The Game Awards 2023 and Adventure Game of the Year at the 27th Annual D.I.C.E. Awards. A sequel, which will serve as a conclusion to the Jedi trilogy, is in development.

== Gameplay ==
In this gameplay screenshot, Cal Kestis, the game's player character, fights Imperial Forces with a double-bladed lightsaber on Coruscant.

Star Wars Jedi: Survivor is a third-person action-adventure video game. The game's playable character, Jedi Knight Cal Kestis, is equipped with a lightsaber to fight against enemies. Both Cal and his enemies have a health meter and a block meter. He can use his lightsaber to strike against enemies or block incoming melee attacks or projectiles. By observing the attack patterns of enemies, Cal can parry hostile attacks just before they land. Parrying an enemy will significantly deplete their block meter, opening up an opportunity to strike and deal large damage. Some enemies will glow red when they attempt to launch an unblockable attack. These attacks cannot be parried, and players must dodge them. The game features five different lightsaber stances (double-bladed, dual-wield, single, blaster, and crossguard), each of which is useful against various enemy types and encounters, though players can only equip any two of them at a time in the game. For instance, the double-bladed stance is suitable for fighting a large group of enemies, while the crossguard stance, despite being slow, is able to inflict powerful damage. The game offers five distinct difficulty modes for players to choose from.

Cal also has access to several Force abilities, allowing him to pull and push enemies and projectiles and briefly slow down time using the Force. As players progress, they will unlock more telekinetic abilities such as lifting and slamming enemies onto the ground and confusing enemies into attacking their own. Using Force abilities will deplete Cal's Force meters, though it will gradually replenish. Throughout the game, Cal is accompanied by a droid named BD-1. In combat, the droid heals Cal using Stim Canisters and helps hack into hostile droids. Occasionally, they will be joined with a companion character who will assist them in both combat and traversal. As players progress and eliminate enemies, they will gain experience points (XP), which can be used to upgrade Cal's skills. The skill tree is divided into three categories, focusing on Cal's combat stance, Force powers, and survival skills. Each combat stance has its own distinct skill trees and special abilities. Players can also equip Cal with perks, which provide passive combat bonuses.

While some of the planets in Jedi: Survivor are linear levels, some locations are large, sprawling spaces for players to explore freely. Meditation circles are scattered throughout the game, in which players can restore their health, though doing so will cause all enemies to respawn. Meditation circles also served as fast travel points and a venue for players to change their combat stance and upgrade their skills. Cal will also respawn in the nearest mediation point after he is killed in combat. Attacking the same enemy who defeats Cal after respawning will allow players to retrieve all lost XP. The game also introduces ridable mounts, allowing players to travel through locations quickly. Cal is an agile character who can perform moves such as wall-running, air-dashing, and double-jumping using his Force powers. Early on in the game, Cal will unlock the Ascension cable, which serves as a grappling hook for him to reach distant ledges. Players need to chain these highly acrobatic moves together in order to reach great distances and complete platforming challenges to progress. The game adopts a structure similar to a Metroidvania game. Both Cal and BD-1 will unlock new upgrades and tools for traversal and reaching previously inaccessible areas. Players can also unlock various shortcuts, allowing repeated visits to the same location to be more efficient.

Players will encounter other non-playable characters who will give Cal side quests (known as rumors in the game). Some of them can be recruited to join Cal at Pyloon's Saloon, unlocking more side content such as eliminating bounty hunters pursuing Cal, planting alien seeds, and playing Holotactics, an in-game tabletop game. BD-1 will also help open hidden treasure chests that unlock additional cosmetic items for both Cal, his lightsaber, and BD-1. They will also find various collectibles, which can be sold to vendors in exchange for upgrades, perks, or customization items. Cal will collect Force Essence, which increases either his maximum health or Force or grants additional skill points or perks. Scattered throughout Koboh are seven High Republic-era Jedi Chambers for players to discover. Jedi Meditation Chambers feature puzzles and challenges for players to complete and provide rewards such as perks or skill points. Players can also complete Force Tears, which are optional challenge rooms that reward players with an additional skill point when completed.

== Synopsis ==
=== Setting and characters ===
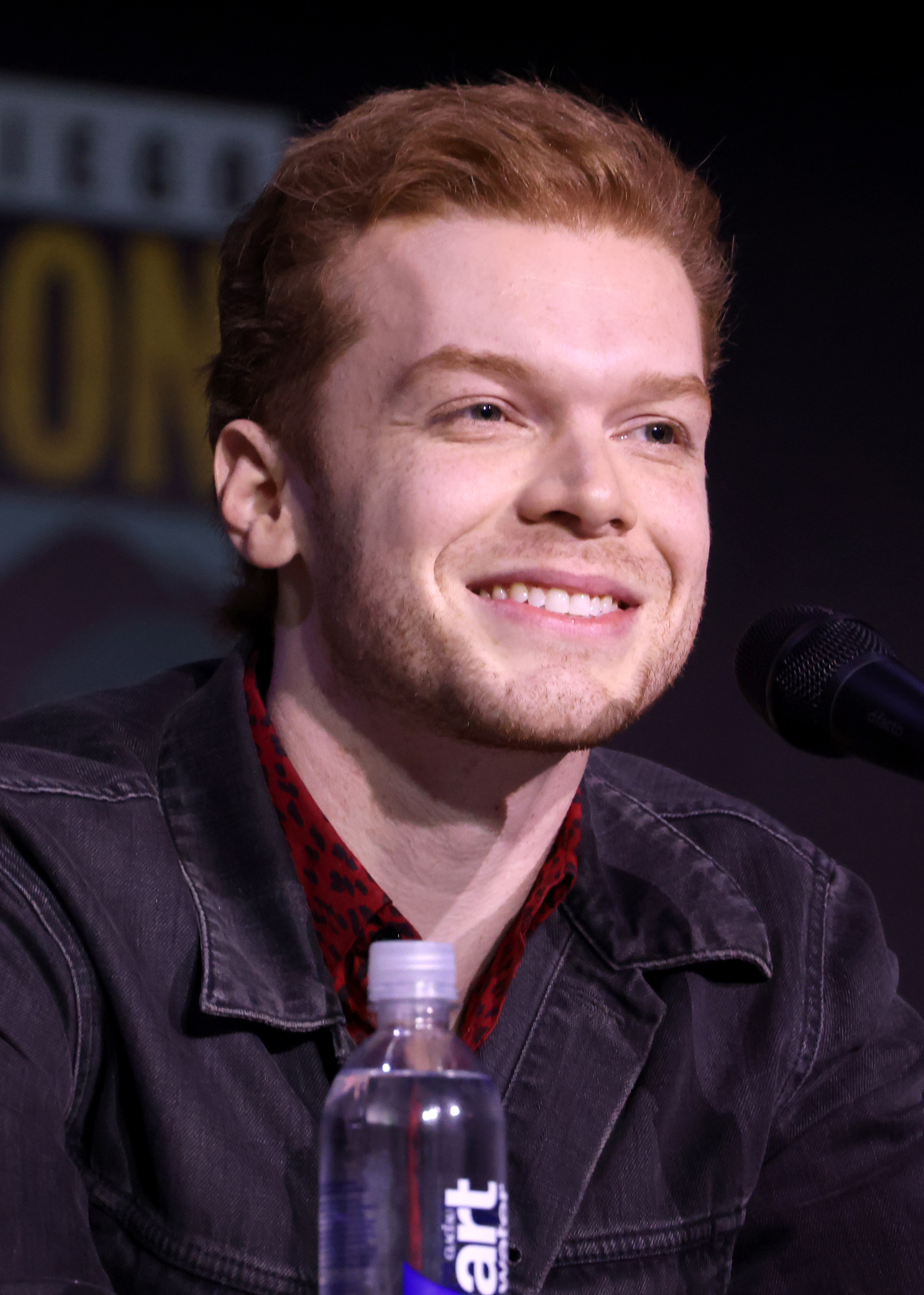
Cameron Monaghan

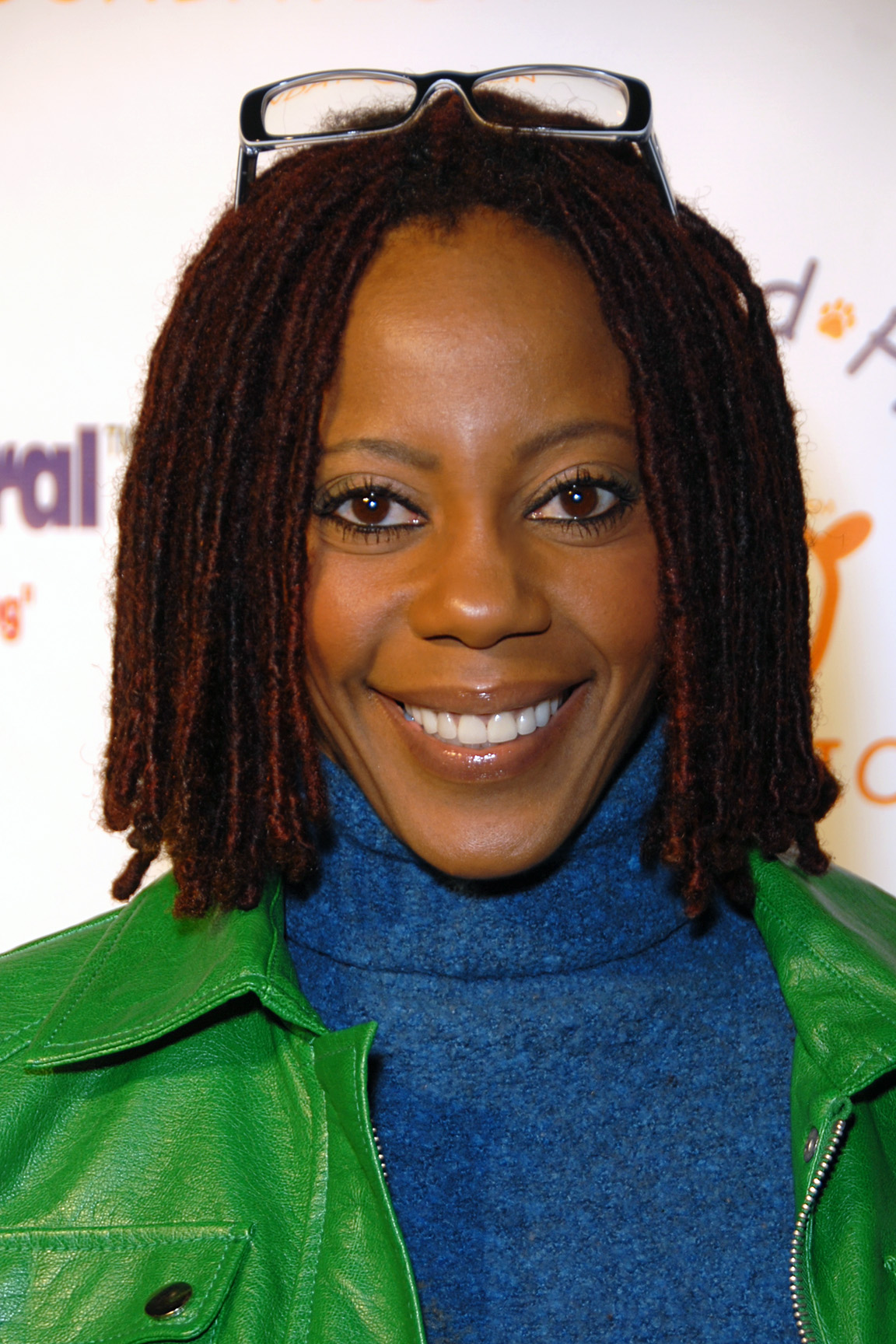
Debra Wilson

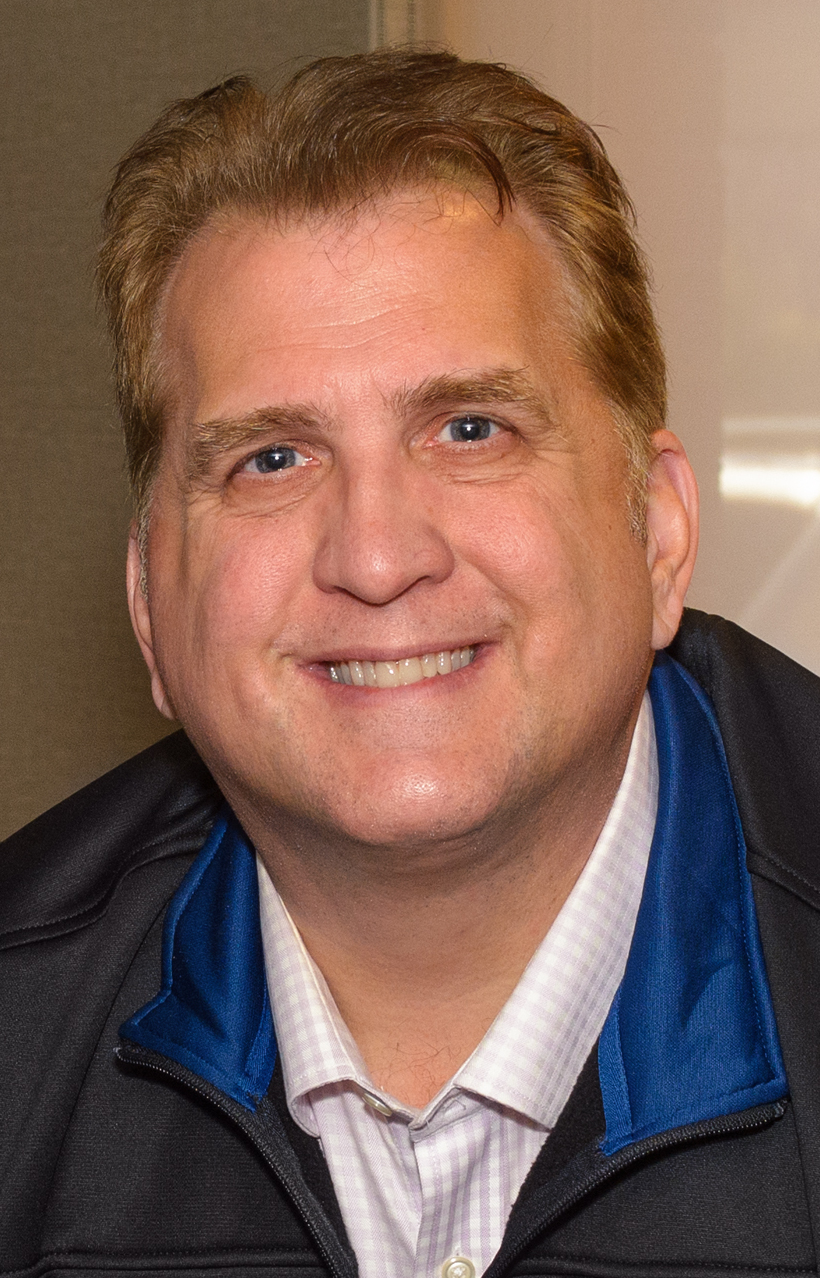
Daniel Roebuck

Monaghan, Wilson, and Roebuck reprised their roles as Cal Kestis, Cere Junda, and Greez Dritus, respectively.

Star Wars Jedi: Survivor takes place five years after the events of Fallen Order. The game follows Jedi Knight Cal Kestis (Cameron Monaghan) as he fights the Empire while searching for a place to hide from them. Cal's allies include Jedi Master Cere Junda (Debra Wilson); former pilot of the Stinger Mantis Greez Dritus (Daniel Roebuck); BD-1 (Ben Burtt), a small droid; Merrin (Tina Ivlev), one of the last surviving members of the Nightsister clan of Dathomir; and Bode Akuna (Noshir Dalal), a mercenary fighting for the safety of his daughter Kata (Tajinae Turner). Other characters include Jedi Master Eno Cordova (Tony Amendola), BD-1's former owner, now helping Cere recover the Jedi Archive; and ZN-A4 (Kendal Rae), a droid from the High Republic Era formerly owned by Jedi Master Santari Khri (Tracy Ifeachor).

Cal fights many enemies during his journey, such as the Pau'an Senator Daho Sejan (T. J. Ramini); Imperial Commander Lank Denvik (Gideon Emery); the Ninth Sister (Misty Lee), who is trained by the Sith Lord Darth Vader (Scott Lawrence) as part of the Imperial Inquisitorius program; former High Republic Dark Jedi Dagan Gera (Cody Fern), who seeks to reach Tanalorr; and his right-hand man, the Gen'Dai Rayvis (D. C. Douglas), the leader of the Bedlam Raiders. Temuera Morrison voices Boba Fett, having portrayed the character several times previously.

=== Plot ===
Five years after destroying the Jedi Holocron, (Note: As depicted in Star Wars Jedi: Fallen Order) Jedi Knight Cal Kestis has parted ways with Cere Junda, Greez Dritus, and Merrin to continue his battle against the Empire as a resistance fighter working under Saw Gerrera. Cal and his team infiltrate the Imperial capital world of Coruscant and steal valuable military data from Senator Daho Sejan. Cal is disheartened to learn from the data that despite all his efforts, the Empire has become more powerful, expanding its reach farther through the galaxy.

The Ninth Sister arrives to confront and exact revenge on Cal, killing Sejan and most of Cal's team, but is killed by Cal soon after. Cal and his mercenary comrade Bode Akuna escape Coruscant, but the Stinger Mantis is damaged. After protecting Greez's town on Koboh from a group of marauders known as the Bedlam Raiders, Cal reunites with Greez to repair the Mantis. While searching the required parts for the repairs, Cal stumbles on ZN-A4, or "Zee", a droid that served the Jedi Order during the High Republic era. Zee gives Cal a tuner device that activates a facility called the Forest Array, which Zee was ordered to activate centuries ago before becoming incapacitated. Cal travels to the Array and has a vision of High Republic Jedi Dagan Gera and Santari Khri, who discovered the mythical planet of Tanalorr hidden behind the supposedly impassable Koboh Abyss nebula. Cal discovers a one-armed Dagan in a bacta tank; in the hopes of recruiting a former Jedi, Cal frees him, but Dagan, having turned to the Dark Side, attacks Cal and escapes with the Gen'Dai warrior Rayvis, the leader of the Bedlam Raiders.

Realizing the value of a planet inaccessible to the Empire, Cal, Bode, and Greez repair the Mantis and head for the planet Jedha, where Cere has been working with Merrin and Eno Cordova to rebuild the Jedi Archives with the help of a resistance organization called the Hidden Path. Cordova explains that Dagan was the first and only pilot to find a path through the Koboh Abyss. Santari developed special compasses to navigate it, and the Republic established a settlement and Jedi Temple on Tanalorr. However, the Republic withdrew from the planet and destroyed the compasses when it was assaulted by a group of raiders known as the Nihil. (Note: The Nihil are the main antagonists of the High Republic era of Star Wars.) Angry at the Jedi Order for abandoning the planet, Dagan killed several Jedi while attempting to retrieve one of the compasses, resulting in Santari severing his arm and imprisoning him in the bacta tank. Cal, Merrin, Bode, and Greez search for the three remaining compasses; Bode wishes to find a refuge for his young daughter Kata, while Merrin believes that the Hidden Path could use Tanalorr as their new home. During their journey, Cal and Merrin confess their feelings for each other and decide to pursue a relationship.

After two of the compasses prove unsalvageable, Cal fights and kills Rayvis and Dagan before recovering a compass that Cordova may repair. The Empire attacks Jedha, and Bode murders Cordova and steals the compass. Cal confronts him, and Bode reveals himself as an Imperial spy and a fallen Jedi, before incapacitating Cal. Meanwhile, Cere attempts to prevent the Empire from reaching the archives. She is killed when Darth Vader uses the assault as an opportunity to incinerate the collection, ultimately leading to its destruction. Furious over Bode's betrayal and the deaths of Cere and Cordova, Cal infiltrates an Imperial Security Bureau (ISB) base on Nova Garon to locate him. Bode reveals that he made a deal with ISB commander Lank Denvik to work as a spy in exchange for keeping him and Kata hidden from Vader, but flees with the compass and Kata. In his rage, Cal briefly embraces the Dark Side to escape the garrison, nearly executes Denvik, but Merrin talks him down to prevent him from killing out of hatred, leading him to leave Denvik to be punished by Vader as retribution. After recovering a recording left behind by Santari, Cal learns that the arrays on Koboh can be used to open an alternate path through the Koboh Abyss.

The group arrives at Tanalorr and attempts to convince Bode to surrender, but an unhinged Bode refuses and attacks, endangering Merrin and even Kata in his rage. Cal, after embracing the Dark Side again in defense of Merrin and, seeing that his former friend is beyond redemption, fatally shoots Bode. Afterward, the group holds a Jedi funeral to mourn Cere, Cordova, and Bode. With the planet now under their control, Cal, Merrin, and Greez decide to adopt Kata and plan to contact the Hidden Path to relocate them to Tanalorr.

== Development ==
Star Wars Jedi: Survivor was developed by Respawn Entertainment. Stig Asmussen returned from Star Wars Jedi: Fallen Order to serve as the game's director. Development of the game began in late 2019 and lasted for three and a half years. The game's production was significantly affected by the COVID-19 pandemic, with Asmussen adding that a significant portion of the game was created with the team working remotely. Survivor is the final Star Wars game published by Electronic Arts as per its 10-year exclusivity contract with Lucasfilm, which was set to expire later in the year.

=== Gameplay ===
Respawn described Survivor as "an expansion of Fallen Order in every possible way", with the team aiming to address players' feedback and make the general experience more polished. Fast travel and a more refined holomap were identified as some of the most requested features from players. The team also reintroduced mechanics that were scrapped in Fallen Order. For instance, the dual-wield stance was planned for the first game, but it was only relegated to a special attack as the team did not have enough time to fully flesh out its gameplay. Respawn made an intentional decision to unlock all of Cal's skills in Fallen Order at the beginning of Survivor, because Cal Kestis was no longer a weak apprentice like he was in the first game. To prevent Cal from being too overpowered, the team introduced various enemy types that can counter some of his Force powers. Early in the game's development, the team decided that droids would become a more prominent enemy type, as they gave the team more freedom to create distinct weapons and attack patterns. To maintain an overall sense of progression, Respawn decided that new skills and upgrades were tied to the game's story and were not found as hidden collectibles. The team did not want to fundamentally change the combat system from the first game, but combat was designed to be more fluid than Fallen Order, with the team comparing it to dancing. AI-controlled companions were introduced in Survivor. These companions will respond to players' actions with their own skills, though this was not taught to players in order to create "emergent" moments that were choreographed like movies.

As with Fallen Order, Survivor adopted a structure that is similar to a Metroidvania game. The studio had aimed to introduce more optional areas for players to discover. To encourage exploration, the team introduced numerous customization options and gameplay upgrades scattered throughout the game's world. Lead level designer Martin Badowsky said that Respawn wanted Koboh to feature a dense central area with more open outskirts areas as players explore outwards. In addition, the Mantis landing pads have been moved to more central locations on planets to provide easier access to the various regions. Planets were designed to encourage repeated visits, as players can utilize their newly acquired skills to access previously out-of-reach areas. The geography of Koboh, which had a lot of vertical landscape and flat surfaces, was inspired by terraced rice fields and canyon overhangs. The team attempted to maintain an "Old West" aesthetic, and settlements in the game were inspired by farm buildings and modular homes. The team wanted Jedha to feel "ancient" and "almost mythical" as it was considered to be a spiritual planet for Force users, and the team was inspired by Mediterranean and Egyptian antiquity while creating it. Tanalorr was described by Respawn as a "heaven-like, otherworldly" environment; blue and purple were chosen as the planet's major color hue to create a "very mild and quiet" ambiance. Environmental puzzles in the game, such as those found in Mediation Chambers on Koboh, were inspired by the shrines found in The Legend of Zelda: Breath of the Wild.

=== Story ===
The team worked closely with Lucasfilm to ensure that events in the game will not clash with other projects or affect the wider developments in the galaxy, prompting the team to position Cal as an important player in a conflict not seen previously in films or other projects. As opposed to his scrappy image from the previous game, Cal was more comparable to a typical Star Wars hero, being more experienced and confident. However, according to Monaghan, Cal's worldview has changed after years of fighting the Empire, becoming more weary of the world and people and losing his determination. Monaghan portrayed Cal as a young hero bearing a "weight beyond his years", and added that the character lost "a lot of his naivete over the years." According to Respawn, Cal is tired of fighting a losing war, but he does not want to give up because too many people have sacrificed for their fight. The game explored the role of a Jedi during increasingly difficult times. The use of a blaster, a weapon Jedi typically frowned upon, also symbolized Cal's straying away from being a Jedi Knight. Cal tapped into the Dark Side several times in the game, with the narrative team aiming to leave the character in an "uneasy state" at the end of the game. Cinematic cutscenes were designed to be more "gritty", "visceral", and "grounded" to fit the game's darker tone. Composer Gordy Haab added that the game's original score also had a darker tone to reflect the "omnipresence" of the Empire. Despite this, the narrative team attempted to maintain a sense of adventure, sprinkled with moments of levity and humor.

A number of supporting characters from Fallen Order returned in Survivor. Cere Junda, now allied with the religious Anchorites to preserve the Jedi Archives, sports a shaved head to reflect the character's simpler and more spiritual life. Merrin, meanwhile, was more confident than she was in Fallen Order, and her romantic relationship with Cal became a central theme for the game. BD-1 was described as the "emotional cornerstone" for Cal's story. Gideon Emery, who portrayed the droid on set, followed the same motion capture process as other actors. He provided the sounds for the droid while wearing a nose flute, while following Monaghan around holding a cardboard replica of BD-1. According to Joanna Robb, the game's narrative technical designer, Bode was "tricky to handle at all levels", as they had to lead players into believing he was an ally for a significant portion of the game while seeding in elements making his eventual betrayal more devastating. The team implemented mechanics to ensure that he was genuinely helpful in combat and wrote banter dialogues for the two characters to establish their developing bond. According to Robb, some of the techniques used by Bode against enemies were used against Cal in subsequent boss battles. The team described the relationship between the two characters as "tragic", as the two had similar upbringings and had developed a genuine friendship with each other. Bode was created by narrative designer Aaron Contreras, who was inspired by the character Bodhi from Point Break.

Rayvis was a member of the fictional species Gen'dai, whose body is made up of regenerative tentacles. The team described Rayvis as a character with a strong sense of honor and a "chivalrous knight in his world." Rayvis led a group of mercenaries named the Bedlam Raiders, which were described by the team as "resourceful" and "ruthless"; their settlements were inspired by the nomadic tribes in the Tibetan Plateau. Dagan Gera, a High Republic Jedi who had fallen to the Dark Side, was considered to be an "interesting foil" for Cal and "a reflection of the dark path Cal could go down". While Dagan is obsessed with reaching the planet Tanalorr, the team ensured that he is not a "static" villain, as he gradually developed other grievances, blaming Cal for failing to stop the Empire from taking over. According to concept artist Theo Stylianides, Dagan's pale appearance and light-colored eyes helped evoke "an aura of mystery". His relationship with Santari Khri was also designed to mirror Cal's relationship with Merrin. As the High Republic era showed the Jedi Order at its height, Cal wandering through its ruins created an uncomfortable situation for him.

== Release ==
The development of a sequel to Star Wars Jedi: Fallen Order was announced in January 2022. The game's title of Star Wars Jedi: Survivor was announced for Windows, PlayStation 5, and Xbox Series X and Series S in May 2022 alongside the debut of a CGI teaser trailer at Star Wars Celebration. EA showed expanded gameplay for the game at The Game Awards on December 8, 2022, while also announcing that it would be released on March 17, 2023. On January 31, 2023, EA announced that the game's release would be delayed to April 28, 2023, for the Respawn development team to carry out final bug fixes. There are three cosmetic sets available with a pre-order of the game. The first, available with a pre-order of both the standard and deluxe editions, is a "Hermit" cosmetic set replicating Obi-Wan Kenobi's outfit from the Obi-Wan Kenobi series and Kenobi's lightsaber from Episode I and Episode II. The two exclusive "Scoundrel" and "Rebel Hero" cosmetic sets available with the deluxe edition replicate Han Solo's DL-44 blaster and scoundrel outfit and Luke Skywalker's yellow jacket outfit from Episode IV. Versions for PlayStation 4 and Xbox One were released on September 17, 2024.

Star Wars Jedi: Battle Scars is a tie-in novel written by Sam Maggs, released on March 7, 2023, which bridges the five-year story gap between Fallen Order and Survivor. Cal was also introduced as a special playable character in the mobile game Star Wars: Galaxy of Heroes on iOS and Android, unlocked by completing a series of stages that recapped the events of Fallen Order with several characters from that game the player was required to collect and upgrade. EA and Disney also partnered with Hasbro and The Lego Group to release figurines and Lego sets of Cal Kestis, respectively, and collaborated with Dark Horse Comics to release an art book based on the game. Additional figurines based on Cal, Merrin, Turgle and Skoova Stev, were released by Hasbro in August 2025. Disney also released a replica of Cal's lightsaber in August 2023. A free PC copy of Star Wars Jedi: Survivor was included with a purchase of an AMD Ryzen 7000 processor in a promotional bundle deal that ran from January 2023 until April 1, 2023.

== Reception ==
=== Critical reception ===
Reception

Aggregate scores
Aggregator	Score
Metacritic	PC: 78/100; PS5: 85/100; XSXS: 86/100
OpenCritic	88%

Review scores
Publication	Score
Game Informer	9.25/10
GameSpot	8/10
GamesRadar+	4.5/5
IGN	9/10
PC Gamer (US)	80/100
PCGamesN	8/10
The Guardian	5/5
VG247	4/5

Star Wars Jedi: Survivor received "generally favorable" reviews from critics, according to review aggregator website Metacritic. 88% of the critics recommended the game on OpenCritic. Many critics felt that Survivor was a notable improvement when compared with its predecessor.

Rick Lane from The Guardian called the game "visually spectacular, mechanically sophisticated and riotously entertaining", adding that it had everything a player will want from a Star Wars game and a blockbuster production. Matt Miller from Game Informer praised the game's combat for being "challenging" and the boss battles for being climactic and memorable, adding that players need to carefully observe enemy movement in order to succeed in combat. Dan Stapleton from IGN wrote that Survivor had "some of the flashiest and fiercest Star Wars melee battles", and the presence of a dismemberment mechanic made combat more gratifying. He praised the enemy variety, which includes both the Imperial forces and the Separatist droids from the prequel trilogy. GameSpot's Jordan Ramée praised the flow of combat, which demanded players balance careful timing and strategic aggression. Connor Makar from VG247 praised the combat stances for catering to a wide range of play styles. Writing for Polygon, Todd Harper, while considering the combat an improvement over Fallen Order, criticized the tight parry window and certain encounters for overwhelming Cal with enemies, making fights "intolerable." Several critics praised Respawn's decision of making Cal powerful from the get-go and adding fast travel to the game.

Miller appreciated Cal for being a very mobile character and wrote that navigation challenges were kept engaging as they became progressively more complicated. Stapleton also called traversal satisfying and noted that players can cover long distances without ever touching the ground by chaining moves together. Alice Bell from Rock Paper Shotgun, however, felt that traversal may become overwhelming as there were way too many gadgets and options. Morgan Park from PC Gamer wrote that the game was evenly split between combat and platforming, effectively making the game a 3D platformer, singling out Koboh as "a collection of linear levels connected to a central area like spokes on a wheel". Alessandro Fillari from Ars Technica compared the game's structure to God of War (2018) and praised the game's sense of scale, though he remarked that he had difficulty finding how to progress as it was sometimes unclear what objects Cal can climb or latch onto. Bell remarked that while there were not a lot of maps in the game, they were "Swiss-cheese mazes that fold under and over themselves," praising the game's Metroidvania inspirations. Stapleton wrote that levels in the game were meticulously crafted, applauding its density and diverse environments. Writing for GamesRadar, Ali Jones wrote that Koboh "dwarfs all of Jedi: Fallen Order combined", but she felt that Respawn failed to populate these vast spaces "beyond throwing challenges" at the player constantly. Several critics were weary of the wealth of collectibles featured in the game.

Miller felt that the story started very slowly and suffered from a lack of focus, though moment-to-moment character interactions and the game's tackling of classic Star Wars themes such as love and attachment nonetheless made the campaign "memorable and rewarding". Stapleton liked the story's lack of urgency, which encouraged players to explore and complete side content. He felt that Cal had significantly more character development in Survivor and praised Monaghan's performance. However, he felt that the narrative twist was too predictable. Harper also praised the character interactions in the game and noted that Cal's journey of reassembling the team created "an enjoyable Mass Effect 2 vibe". Ramée described the narrative as a "suspenseful story of a Jedi trying to avoid loss", and liked how the antagonists in the game served as a foil to Cal, catalyzing his growth as a character. Park liked how the narrative focused on how Cal grappled with the futility of fighting and coping with the dominance of the Empire, though he felt that these themes were overshadowed midway through the game. Will Nelson from PCGamesN criticized the story for being "formulaic", noting that the narrative reasons for returning to planets were "contrived".

Many reviewers and players noted performance problems with the PC version. PC Gamer's review highlighted an average of 35 frames per second with dips as low as 15-20 frames in cutscenes. EA released a day one patch to improve the game's performance on PC and promised to release more patches in the following weeks. EA stated that a significant reason for poor performance is players using Windows 10 with advanced processors built for Windows 11. Despite the release of several patches, Digital Foundry billed it as "the worst triple-A PC port of 2023", and remarked that the game's performance remained unsatisfactory "[m]ore than 500 days after its initial launch".

=== Sales ===
In Japan, the PlayStation 5 version of Star Wars Jedi: Survivor sold 16,742 physical units, making it the seventh best-selling retail game during its first week of release. In the United Kingdom, Star Wars Jedi: Survivor launch sales were thirty percent higher than those of Star Wars Jedi: Fallen Order. It was the best-selling video game in April 2023 in the United States. CEO of Electronic Arts, Andrew Wilson, wrote that the publisher was "overjoyed" by the game's commercial performance and added that its sales were pacing "strongly" against expectations. In August 2023, EA described the game as a "commercial success". The game was the 6th most-downloaded title on PlayStation 5 in the United States and Canada, and the 9th most-downloaded in Europe during 2023. On Steam, it was among the platform’s top-performing new releases of 2023, based on revenue earned during its first two weeks after launch. It was the ninth best-selling video game in the US in 2023.

=== Awards and accolades ===
Awards and nominations for Star Wars Jedi: Survivor
Year	Award	Category	Result	Ref.
2023	Golden Joystick Awards	Ultimate Game of the Year	Nominated	
2023	Golden Joystick Awards	Best Lead Performer (Cameron Monaghan as Cal Kestis)	Nominated	
2023	Golden Joystick Awards	Best Storytelling	Nominated	
2023	Golden Joystick Awards	PlayStation Game of the Year	Nominated	
2023	The Game Awards 2023	Best Performance (Cameron Monaghan as Cal Kestis)	Nominated	
2023	The Game Awards 2023	Best Action/Adventure Game	Nominated	
2023	The Steam Awards	Outstanding Story-Rich Game	Nominated	
2024	66th Annual Grammy Awards	Best Score Soundtrack for Video Games and Other Interactive Media	Won	
2024	2023 NAVGTR Awards	Camera Direction in a Game Engine	Nominated	
2024	2023 NAVGTR Awards	Control Design, 3D	Nominated	
2024	2023 NAVGTR Awards	Direction in a Game Cinema	Nominated	
2024	2023 NAVGTR Awards	Gameplay Design, Franchise	Nominated	
2024	2023 NAVGTR Awards	Performance in a Drama, Supporting (Tony Amendola as Eno Cordova)	Nominated	
2024	2023 NAVGTR Awards	Sound Editing in a Game Cinema	Nominated	
2024	27th Annual D.I.C.E. Awards	Adventure Game of the Year	Nominated	
2024	27th Annual D.I.C.E. Awards	Outstanding Achievement in Art Direction	Nominated	
2024	27th Annual D.I.C.E. Awards	Outstanding Achievement in Audio Design	Nominated	
2024	27th Annual D.I.C.E. Awards	Outstanding Achievement in Original Music Composition	Nominated	
2024	20th British Academy Games Awards	Best Game	Longlisted	
2024	20th British Academy Games Awards	Animation	Nominated	
2024	20th British Academy Games Awards	Audio Achievement	Nominated	
2024	20th British Academy Games Awards	Music	Nominated	
2024	20th British Academy Games Awards	Narrative	Nominated	
2024	20th British Academy Games Awards	Performer in a Leading Role (Cameron Monaghan as Cal Kestis)	Nominated	
2024	20th British Academy Games Awards	Performer in a Supporting Role (Debra Wilson as Cere Junda)	Nominated	
2024	Game Audio Network Guild Awards	Audio of the Year	Won	
2024	Game Audio Network Guild Awards	Best Audio Mix	Won	
2024	Game Audio Network Guild Awards	Best Cinematic & Cut Scene Audio	Nominated	
2024	Game Audio Network Guild Awards	Best Ensemble Cast Performance	Nominated	
2024	Game Audio Network Guild Awards	Best Game Foley	Nominated	
2024	Game Audio Network Guild Awards	Best Game Trailer Audio	Nominated	
2024	Game Audio Network Guild Awards	Best Main Theme	Nominated	
2024	Game Audio Network Guild Awards	Best Original Song	Nominated	
2024	Game Audio Network Guild Awards	Best Original Soundtrack Album	Won	
2024	Game Audio Network Guild Awards	Best UI, Reward, or Objective Sound Design	Won	
2024	Game Audio Network Guild Awards	Best Performance	Nominated	
2024	Game Audio Network Guild Awards	Creative and Technical Achievement in Music	Nominated	
2024	Game Audio Network Guild Awards	Creative and Technical Achievement in Sound Design	Won	
2024	Game Audio Network Guild Awards	Dialogue of the Year	Nominated	
2024	Game Audio Network Guild Awards	Music of the Year	Won	
2024	Game Audio Network Guild Awards	Sound Design of the Year	Won	
2024	Ivor Novello Awards	Best Original Video Game Score	Won	
2024	Hugo Awards	Best Game or Interactive Work	Nominated	

== Sequel ==
Asmussen left EA to form his own company in 2023, but a spokesperson from EA stated that "veteran Respawn leaders will be stepping up to guide the team as they continue their work on Star Wars Jedi: Survivor." He told interviewers at the time that it was his intention to make the Star Wars Jedi series a trilogy, with the possible third game being built using Unreal Engine 5. In September 2023, Monaghan stated that the team was "in the process of [making a third game] right now". At a September 2024 presentation to investors, EA president Laura Miele announced that a third game was in production, confirming it would be the final game in the series.
