= Lego Star Wars: Rebuild the Galaxy =

Four-part miniseries

- Release poster
- Genre: Action comedy; Science fiction
- Based on: Star Wars by George Lucas
- Showrunners: Dan Hernandez; Benji Samit
- Written by: Dan Hernandez; Benji Samit
- Directed by: Chris Buckley
- Voices of: Gaten Matarazzo; Tony Revolori; Bobby Moynihan; Marsai Martin; Michael Cusack; Ahmed Best; Mark Hamill; Dan Stevens; Ashley Eckstein; Ben Schwartz
- Composers: Michael Kramer; (Based on themes by John Williams)
- Country of origin: United States
- No. of series: 2
- No. of episodes: 8

Production
- Executive producers: Dan Hernandez; Benji Samit; James Waugh; Jacqui Lopez; Josh Rimes; Jill Wilfert; Jason Cosler; Keith Malone
- Producers: Daniel Cavey; Dan Langlois
- Running time: 25–27 minutes
- Production companies: Lucasfilm; The Lego Group; Atomic Cartoons

Original release
- Network: Disney+
- Release: September 13, 2024 – September 19, 2025

Lego Star Wars: Rebuild the Galaxy is a collection of animated television miniseries based on the Lego Star Wars franchise, released on September 13, 2024, on Disney+, written and executive produced by Dan Hernandez and Benji Samit, with Chris Buckley serving as director. The first series follows Sig Greebling, who accidentally activates a powerful Jedi relic that rewrites reality, forcing him to restore things to normal. The second series, titled LEGO Star Wars: Rebuild the Galaxy: Pieces of the Past, was released on September 19, 2025.

== Premise ==
A young nerf-herder named Sig Greebling accidentally removes the Cornerstone, an ancient relic from an ancient Jedi Temple that can rewrite reality at will, which causes the "building blocks" of the galaxy to get mixed up, with characters, locations, species and institutions being changed beyond recognition, with all characters changing into alternate versions of themselves, such as a Sith version of Jar Jar Binks, and a Jedi version of Darth Vader. Now, Sig seeks out the solution to the changes with the help of Jedi Bob, an elusive Jedi long forgotten.

== Cast ==
=== Principal ===
- Gaten Matarazzo as Sig Greebling, a nerf herder. Sig is content with a quiet life and hides his Force powers.
- Tony Revolori as Dev Greebling / Darth Devastator, Sig’s older brother, who wants to travel the galaxy with his friend Yesi Scala. He becomes a Sith Lord after the Cornerstone rewrites the galaxy.
- Bobby Moynihan as Bobarian "Jedi Bob" Afol, an elusive Jedi long forgotten. He is based on a minifigure originating from the Attack of the Clones Republic Gunship set from 2002.
- Marsai Martin as Yesi Scala, who is Dev’s friend. She becomes friends with Sig after the Cornerstone rewrites the galaxy.
- Michael Cusack as Servo, a Gonk droid who is Sig’s friend and roommate.
- Ahmed Best as Darth Jar Jar, a Sith Lord version of Jar Jar Binks.
- Mark Hamill as Luke Skywalker, who has become an unscrupulous podracer after the Cornerstone rewrites the galaxy.
- Dan Stevens as Solitus, Jedi Bob's former master who sought access to the Forcehold.
- Ashley Eckstein as Ahsoka Tano, she is depicted as a Lego BrickHeadz character rather than a traditional minifigure.
- Ben Schwartz as Jaxxon

=== Supporting ===
- Naomi Ackie as Jedi Jannah
- Dee Bradley Baker as Wicket W. Warrick, Darth Nubs
- TC Carson as Mace Windu
- Anthony Daniels as C-3PO
- Trevor Devall as Jedi Master Palpatine, Ackbar Troopers
- Nika Futterman as Asajj Ventress
- Brian George as Ki-Adi-Mundi
- Jake Green as Greedo
- Jennifer Hale as Mon Mothma and Viper Probe Droid
- Phil LaMarr as Darth Kit Fisto
- Ross Marquand as Han Solo
- Piotr Michael as Yoda
- Cameron Monaghan as Cal Kestis
- Kevin Michael Richardson as Farmer Scala, Jedi Jabba the Hutt
- Helen Sadler as Darth Rey
- Matt Sloan as Jedi Vader
- André Sogliuzzo as Cassian Andor
- Catherine Taber as Pirate Queen Amidala
- James Arnold Taylor as Obi-Wan Kenobi
- Kelly Marie Tran as Darth Rose
- Alan Tudyk as K-2SO
- Billy Dee Williams as The Landolorian
- Sam Witwer as Maul
- Matthew Wood as General Grievous
- Shelby Young as Princess Leia

== Episodes ==
=== Series overview ===
Series	Episodes	Originally released
Rebuild the Galaxy	4	September 13, 2024
Pieces of the Past	4	September 19, 2025

=== Rebuild the Galaxy (2024) ===
No. overall	No. in season	Title	Directed by	Written by	Original release date
1	1	"Part One"	Chris Buckley	Dan Hernandez & Benji Samit	September 13, 2024
A nerf herder named Sig Greebling lives with his older brother Dev and their Gonk droid Servo on the pastoral planet of Fennesa. While Dev wants to travel the galaxy with his friend Yesi Scala, Sig is content with a quiet life and hides his Force powers. Following an ion storm, the two brothers discover an ancient Jedi Temple. Dev dares Sig into using his Force powers by removing the "Cornerstone" despite the objections of a cloaked figure. Removing the Cornerstone causes the "building blocks" of the galaxy to get mixed up, with characters, locations, species and institutions becoming alternate versions of themselves. In the newly reconstituted galaxy, Sig reunites with Yesi, who has no memory of the Greebling brothers and has joined the Rebellion. The two are captured by Dev, who has become the Sith Lord "Darth Devastator." They are followed by a mysterious cloaked man, who reassures Servo he will rescue Sig and Yesi.
2	2	"Part Two"	Chris Buckley	Dan Hernandez & Benji Samit	September 13, 2024
Darth Devastator and his apprentice Darth Rey torture Sig and Yesi. To save Yesi, Sig attempts to give Dev the Cornerstone but the two are rescued by the cloaked man, who reveals himself as Jedi Master Bobarian Afol ("Bob"). After escaping Dev's forces, Jedi Bob briefs Sig and Yesi about the history of the Cornerstone. Since the Cornerstone has bonded to Sig, Jedi Bob trains him to be a Force Builder, a Jedi who is able to use the Force to build objects. Sig uses his powers to give Servo the ability to speak. After escaping Ewok bounty hunters and C-3PO, the four travel to a water-covered Tatooine where they seek out Luke Skywalker at the Mos Eisley cantina. Skywalker, who has become an unscrupulous podracer, refuses to help. Darth Dev and his Sith followers, including Darth Jar Jar, track the group down, resulting in a skirmish.
3	3	"Part Three"	Chris Buckley	Dan Hernandez & Benji Samit	September 13, 2024
Sig and his companions escape with the help of Luke Skywalker, who has experienced a change of heart. The group seek out a group of hidden Jedi including Jedi Vader, Palpatine, Jabba the Hutt, Jannah and Dooku, who reluctantly agree to help Sig meditate so that he can locate the Force Builder temple on Dagobah. The group are joined by Rebellion General Leia, her lover Greedo and Han Solo. Sig and his companions travel aboard Greedo and Han's Slave I to Dagobah. While Sig and Bob want to return the Cornerstone to the Force Builder temple, Yesi wants to rescue several imprisoned rebel comrades including Yoda, Grievous and Mace Windu. However, Yesi's group is betrayed by Solo, who is Dev's secret spy and jealous that Leia chose Greedo over him. At the temple, Jedi Bob admits that the Cornerstone is unable to restore the previous galaxy, having accidentally undone his own galaxy as well. Dev confronts Sig and Bob. After Dev destroys Servo, Sig gives up the Cornerstone in return for Dev sparing Jedi Bob.
4	4	"Part Four"	Chris Buckley	Dan Hernandez & Benji Samit	September 13, 2024
Aboard his flagship Separator, Dev forces Sig to use the Cornerstone to activate the warship's superlaser, which destroys and recreates their homeworld of Fennesa as a green pastoral world. Dev invites his younger brother Sig to combine their powers and rule the galaxy together. Sig rejects his older brother's overtures while Rey and the other Sith stage a coup d'etat against their Sith Lord. Sig and Jedi Bob take advantage of the coup to escape into space. On Dagobah, Yesi and Greedo escape the prison and use the stolen Dark Falcon to turn the tables on Han and the Ackbar troopers. Leia's rebels, Palpatine's Jedi, Yesi's group, C-3PO and the Ewok mercenaries launch an attack on Dev's fleet above Fennesa. During the space battle, Dev unleashes the Separator's superlaser, which causes heavy casualties. Sig and Jedi Bob defeat Dev during a climatic duel and reclaim the Cornerstone. Dev escapes the battle with his surviving fleet. On Dagobah, Sig restores the Cornerstone to the Force Builder temple and buries the Temple. Together with Yesi and a rebuilt Servo, the Force builders travel to the planet Alistan Nor to continue Sig's training. Meanwhile, Darth Rey and Darth Rose Tico hire the Landolorian and Grogu to hunt down Sig.

=== Pieces of the Past (2025) ===
No. overall	No. in season	Title	Directed by	Written by	Original release date
5	1	"Part One"	Chris Buckley	Dan Hernandez & Benji Samit	September 19, 2025
On Alistan Nor, Sig continues his training under Jedi Bob, who has restyled himself as Master Afol. Yesi has become a cargo pilot, hauling goods aboard the Dark Falcon. After receiving Force visions that his estranged brother Dev is on Dathomir, Sig along with Master Afol, Bob and Yesi travel to a conclave temple site on the planet. There, they encounter Dev, who is attempting to access a mysterious power source at the site. After unsuccessfully attempting to bring his brother back to the light side, the two Force users fight. Their powers create a Force dyad that allows Afol's former Jedi Master Solitus to open a portal back into the Greebling brothers' galaxy. He banishes the two brothers and Servo into a mystical realm known as the Forcehold and embarks on his plan to erase all life in the galaxy.
6	2	"Part Two"	Chris Buckley	Dan Hernandez & Benji Samit	September 19, 2025
In the distant past, Bobarian Afol banished his Master Solitus into the Forcehold after his fallen master revealed his plans to banish his opponents into the Forcehold. Seeking to usher the end of existence, Solitus banishes entire worlds and their populations into the Forcehold. Meanwhile, the Greebling brothers and Servo encounter Jaxxon and Ahsoka Tano, who rescue them from a rampaging giant Chewbacca. Tano has established a village populated by castoffs who were banished into the Forcehold after their galaxies were destroyed, including Maul and Cal Kestis. Together, the Greebling brothers and their new allies travel to Solistus' fortress where they attempt to use kyber crystals to create a portal into the Greebling brothers' galaxy. The group are attacked by evil versions of Obi-Wan Kenobi and Revan but Jaxxon and Chewbacca manage to buy the Greebling brothers, Tano and Servo enough time to escape the Forcehold. Traveling aboard the Dark Falcon, Afol and Yesi used a pod of space-faring porrgil to reach the Jedi on Canto Bight. However, Solitus beats them to the Jedi and banishes most of them into the Forcehold. Jedi Vader, Luke Skywalker and Princess Leia are rescued by Afol and Yesi.
7	3	"Part Three"	Chris Buckley	Dan Hernandez & Benji Samit	September 19, 2025
The Greebling brothers, Tano and Servo escape the Forcehold back into the Dathomir conclave temple. Solitus visits the two brothers in a Force vision and offers Dev a place as his apprentice. Meanwhile Afol, Yesi, Vader, Luke and Leia are captured by the forces of the Pirate Queen Amidala, who is bitter towards Vader for not accepting her as a pirate. Amidala attempts to feed Vader, Afol and Yesi to several Snoke clones but they are rescued by the Greebling brothers, who traveled to Naboo with Tano and Servo. Sig convinces Queen Amidala to join forces with them against Solitus. However, Afol's animosity towards Dev embitters the latter. During the space battle, Sig and his allies wipe out most of Solitus's droid forces. However, the Sith, with the help of Darth Jar Jar, recapture the Dark Falcon and take Yesi and Servo prisoner. The Greebling brothers and Afol force their way aboard Solitus's flagship Oblivion Runner. During the duel, Solitus convinces Dev to become his apprentice and banishes the others into the Forcehold.
8	4	"Part Four"	Chris Buckley	Dan Hernandez & Benji Samit	September 19, 2025
Since the Forcehold has absorbed the entire galaxy, it starts to fall apart into oblivion. Sig convinces the various rebels, Jedi, Sith and pirates to join forces to form a Force Myriad in order to return to the galaxy. They invade Solitus's planet but he summons an army of battle droids to crush them. Led by Yesi, the allies defeat two waves of battle droids. Solitus has the remaining droids form a giant K-2SO droid and two droidekas. Ahsoka Tano brings reinforcements including Chewbacca, Jaxxon, Ben Solo and Cal Kestis who defeat the giant droids. Dev turns on Solitus, revealing that he pretended to join him to save Sig. Dev, Sig and Afol fight Solitus, who summons several portals into oblivion. Together, the three Force users banish him into oblivion. With Solitus's defeat, the galaxy is restored from the Forcehold and the inhabitants proceed with rebuilding their lives. Dev becomes Master Afol's new apprentice.

== Production ==
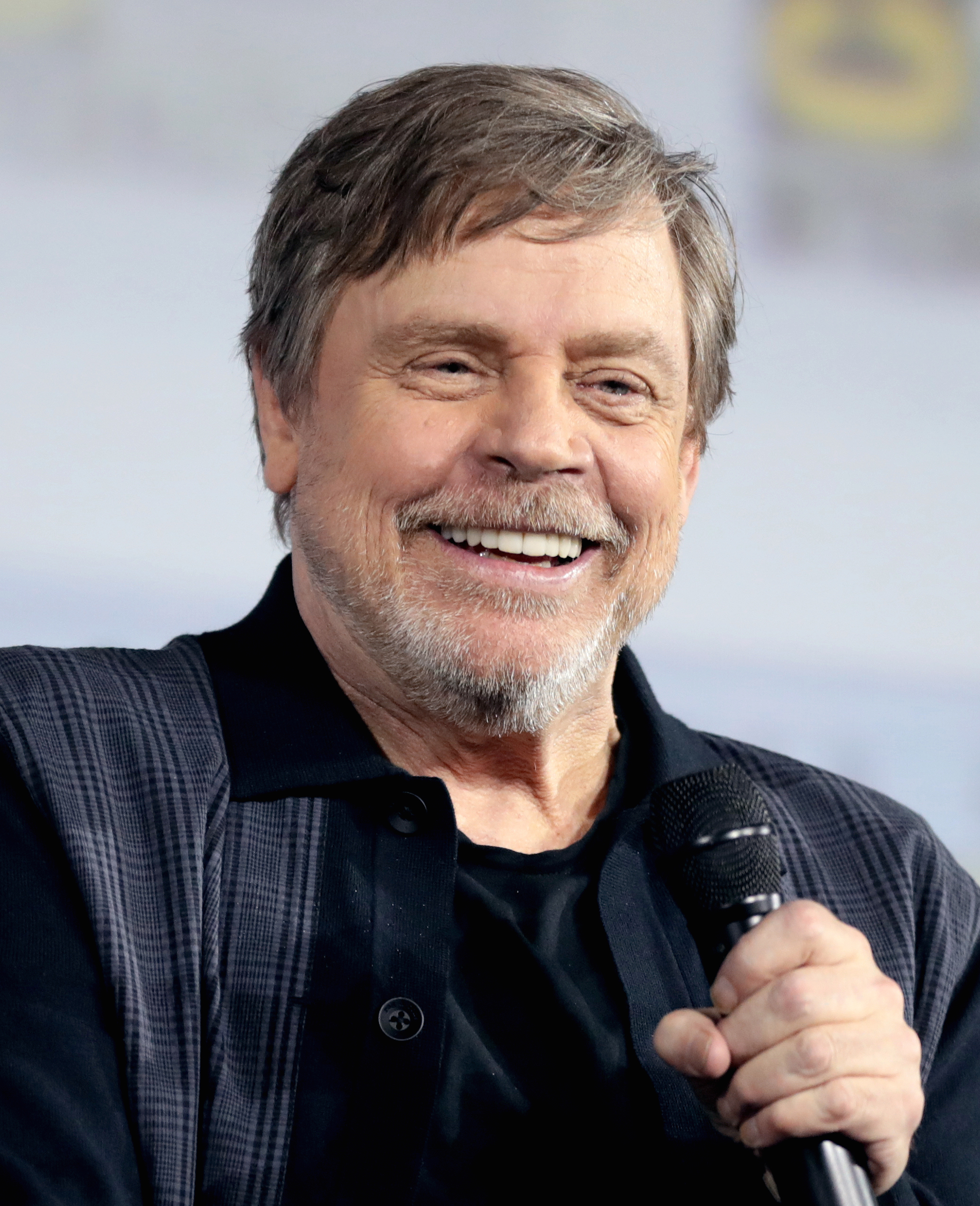
Hamill in 2019

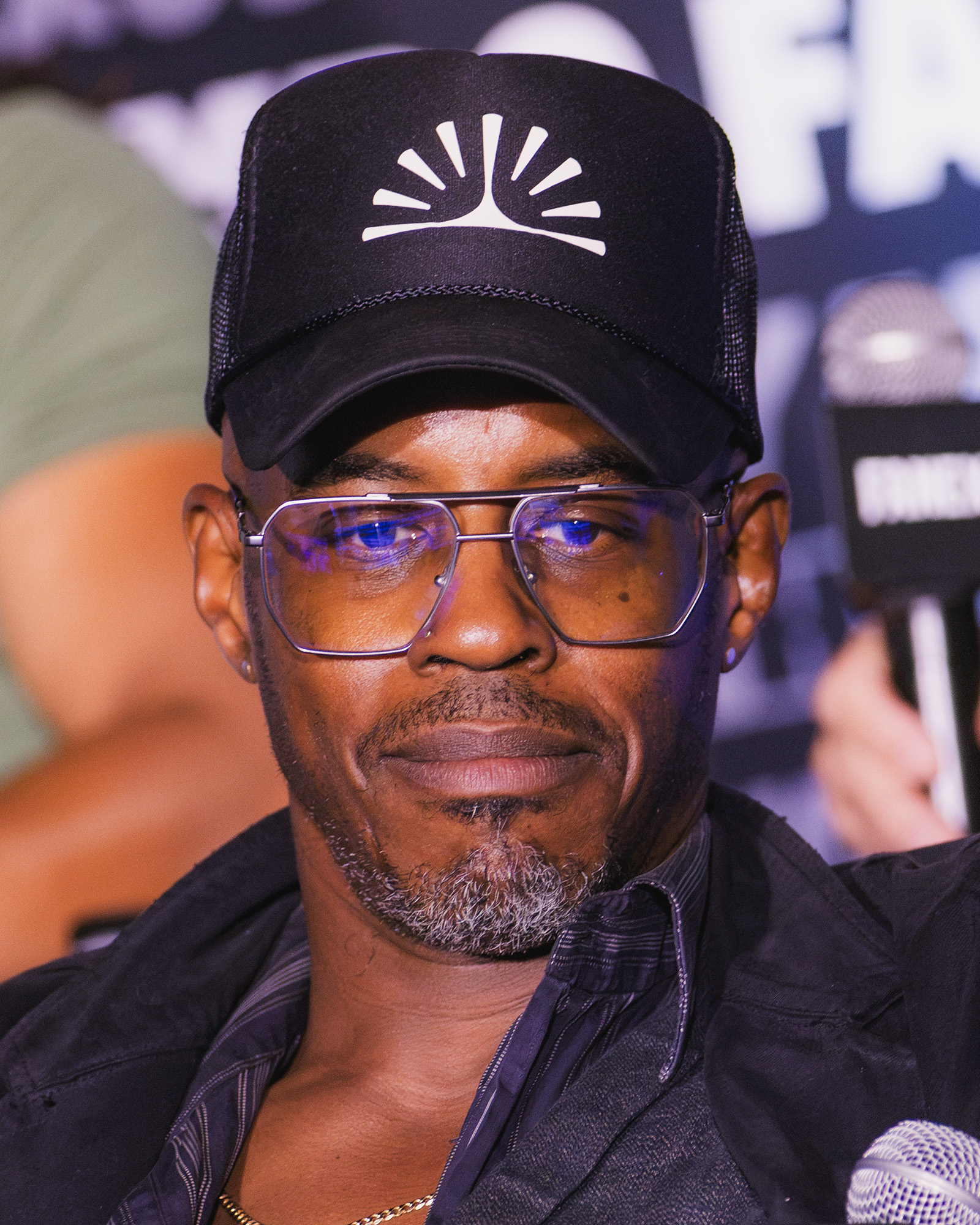
Best in 2010

Rebuild the Galaxy features franchise veterans Mark Hamill and Ahmed Best reprising their roles as Luke Skywalker and Jar Jar Binks.

On May 6, 2024, two days after Star Wars Day, a miniseries based on the LEGO Star Wars brand was announced. Rebuild the Galaxy depicts an alternate version of the Star Wars universe on opposite sides from all eras, with a relic founded by the main character, Sig Greebling, serving as a plot device. The idea of having Jar Jar Binks being depicted as a Sith under the name "Darth Jar Jar", was inspired after several fan theories surrounding the character.

The miniseries features the on-screen debut of Jedi Bob, a minifigure originating from the Attack of the Clones Republic Gunship set from 2002 where he was depicted as a then-unnamed Jedi character. He was later given the name "Bob" as an inside joke from the fandom in the LEGO Star Wars Visual Dictionary, published in 2009.

=== Casting ===
Along with the release of the teaser trailer for the series, it was announced that both Ahmed Best and Mark Hamill would be reprising their roles as Jar Jar Binks and Luke Skywalker from the Skywalker Saga films. Other cast members include Gaten Matarazzo and Tony Revolori as the Greebling brothers, Marsai Martin as Yesi Scala, Michael Cusack as Servo, and Bobby Moynihan, who had previously contributed voice work for the franchise, voices Jedi Bob.

During the D23 fan event on August 9, 2024, it was announced that Anthony Daniels, Kelly Marie Tran, and Billy Dee Williams would be reprising their roles as C-3PO, Rose Tico, and Lando Calrissian, as well with Naomi Ackie returning as Jannah from Star Wars: The Rise of Skywalker (2019).

During the Star Was Celebration event on April 19, 2025, Best confirmed that he along with Matarazzo and Revolori would be reprising their roles in the sequel series. In addition, Ben Schwartz was cast as the Lepi smuggler Jaxxon and Ashley Eckstein reprised her role as Ahsoka Tano. Later that August, a trailer with a confirmed release date of September 19, 2025 was revealed. Alongside with Alan Tudyk reprising his role as K-2SO from Rogue One and Andor and Cameron Monaghan reprising his role as Cal Kestis.

=== Animation ===
Animation is provided by Atomic Cartoons in Vancouver, British Columbia.

== Marketing ==
A teaser trailer was released on YouTube on May 6, 2024. Several tie-in LEGO sets were then launched in August 2024. The official trailer debuted that same month during D23.

The official trailer for the sequel series Pieces of the Past was released on August 15, 2025. On September 4, a teaser trailer featuring Revan, a character from the 2003 computer game Star Wars: Knights of the Old Republic was released on YouTube.

== Release ==
The first series was released on Disney+ on September 13, 2024. The miniseries was also released on the Star Wars Kids YouTube channel, on December 5 for a limited time.

On April 19, 2025, a sequel series titled LEGO Star Wars: Rebuild the Galaxy: Pieces of the Past was announced at Star Wars Celebration in Japan. The sequel series consisted of four episodes and was released on Disney+ on September 19. All the original voice actors returned as their roles.

== Reception ==
=== Viewership ===
Lego Star Wars: Rebuild the Galaxy: Pieces of the Past ranked No. 1 on Disney+'s daily "Top 10" list a day after its premiere—a ranking based on daily viewership across both films and episodic content—and remained on the chart through September 25, 2025.

=== Critical response ===
On Rotten Tomatoes the first series has a rating of 100% based on reviews from 9 critics. Pieces of the Past also received a rating of 100%, based on reviews from 5 critics.

=== Accolades ===
Lego Star Wars: Rebuild the Galaxy was nominated for Best Limited Series at the 52nd Annie Awards. In November 2025, the series was nominated for "Outstanding Sound Mixing and Sound Editing for an Animated Program" at the 4th Children's and Family Emmy Awards.
