= Another Harvest Moon =

- Directed by: Greg Swartz
- Written by: Jeremy Thomas Black (play and screenplay)
- Produced by: Robert Black; Chad Taylor; Rodney Holland
- Starring: Ernest Borgnine; Piper Laurie; Anne Meara; Doris Roberts
- Cinematography: Jeffrey A. Cunningham
- Edited by: Darren Iovino
- Music by: Kenny Barron
- Production companies: Aurora Films and Music
- Distributed by: MarVista Entertainment
- Release date: August 7, 2009 (RIIFF)
- Running time: 88 minutes
- Country: United States
- Language: English

Another Harvest Moon is a 2009 American drama film written by Jeremy T. Black and directed by Greg Swartz and starring Ernest Borgnine, Piper Laurie, Anne Meara, and Doris Roberts. The plot is about four elderly citizens coping with life in a nursing home. The film was one of Borgnine's last major roles before his death in 2012.

== Plot ==
Four elderly patients at a nursing home have made friends and play cards most days when they are feeling up to it. Unfortunately, Frank is slowing down and is on several medications, such as insulin, and suffers from strokes. June has dementia and is sometimes barely able to recognize to whom she is talking or holding a conversation that is in line with what is being discussed. Ella is upset from breaking her hip due to her old age from merely sitting in a chair. Alice is still bubbly and hanging on her hopes of winning the lottery.

Frank's family visit regularly, including his son Jeffrey and grandson Jack. Frank has also struck up a friendship with one of the orderlies, Paul, who looks after him. When Frank starts forgetting to administer his insulin medication, Paul steps in to continue the task.

On Frank's request, Jeffery brings into the nursing home a memory box of things that Frank put together. Among the items that he has kept to relate to his wife and his war buddies is a gun. Thinking it is empty, Jeffery allows it to be left at the home, as Frank wants to show it to Paul. Missing his dead wife and feeling like his body and mind are becoming more useless, Frank contemplates suicide and is seen handling some bullets that are hidden elsewhere. The story unravels about what will happen next, as Frank's friends and his grandson Jack recognize what Frank wants.

== Cast ==
- Ernest Borgnine as Frank
- Anne Meara as Ella
- Piper Laurie as June
- Doris Roberts as Alice
- Richard Schiff as Jeffrey
- Cybill Shepherd as Wickie
- Amber Benson as Gretchen
- Sunkrish Bala as Paul
- Cameron Monaghan as Jack

== Reception ==
Joe Leydon of Variety described the film as "a well-crafted showcase for vivid performances by veteran thesp[ian]s" and wrote, "This low-key indie drama likely will resonate best with over-50 aud[ience]s and their parents, but it could just as easily engage younger viewers when it fast-forwards to homevid[eo] and cable."
