= Star Wars Jedi: Battle Scars =

2023 Star Wars novel by Sam Maggs

- Author: Sam Maggs
- Audio read by: Sean Kenin Elias-Reyes
- Language: English
- Series: Star Wars
- Subject: Novel
- Genre: Sci-Fi; fantasy; adventure
- Publisher: Random House Worlds; Del Rey
- Publication date: March 7, 2023
- Publication place: United States
- Media type: Print; ebook; audiobook
- Pages: 304
- ISBN: 978-0-59-368313-2 (hardcover)

Star Wars Jedi: Battle Scars is a Star Wars novel written by Sam Maggs and published on March 7, 2023, by Random House Worlds. A tie-in and prequel to the video game Star Wars Jedi: Survivor, it follows Cal Kestis and the Stinger Mantis crew during the five years between the events of Star Wars Jedi: Fallen Order and Survivor.

== Summary ==
Set between 14 BBY and 11 BBY, (Note: BBY, or Before the Battle of Yavin, is a dating system used in Star Wars to indicate timeline years. For reference, Episode III – Revenge of the Sith takes place in 19 BBY while Episode IV – A New Hope takes place in 0 BBY. Star Wars Jedi: Fallen Order is set in 14 BBY.) Star Wars Jedi: Battle Scars tells the story of Jedi Knight Cal Kestis and the crew of the Stinger Mantis in the five years between the video games Star Wars Jedi: Fallen Order (2019) and Star Wars Jedi: Survivor (2023). Cal, Merrin, Cere Junda, and Greez Dritus infiltrate a base belonging to the Haxion Brood crime syndicate built on a remote meteorite. Their mission goes awry and, during their escape, they encounter Fret, a former stormtrooper who has defected from the Empire and seeks to fight against it. The crew travel with Fret to Hosnian Prime to meet a wealthy entrepreneur who hires them for a job that could aid in the fight against the Empire. They must gain access to the schematics of the Shroud, a piece of Imperial cloaking technology, which is also being sought by the Inquisitor Fifth Brother. The Empire gaining access to the Shroud could allow it to wipe out any rebellions or insurgencies.

It is revealed that Fret is not a former Imperial, but a current Imperial, and that the schematics of the Shroud do not physically exist. Rather, the Mantis crew are actually being tasked with finding Irei, the inventor of the Shroud whose mind contains the schematics and who is a former lover of Fret.

== Development ==
After playing Fallen Order when it was released in November 2019, author Sam Maggs publicly stated that she wanted to write a Merrin story. Merrin's small amount of screen time in the game left Maggs "chomping at the bit for more from her".

=== Announcement and release ===
On August 19, 2022, it was announced that Sam Maggs would be writing a tie-in novel to Star Wars Jedi: Survivor that would be published by Del Rey Books on March 7, 2023. Previously, Maggs had contributed to the Star Wars Adventures comic series in 2020 and 2021 and briefly worked as a writer on the delayed remake of Knights of the Old Republic.

On December 1, 2022, the official cover and synopsis for the book were revealed. The Fifth Brother, an Imperial Inquisitor introduced in the animated series Star Wars Rebels, was revealed to serve as the book's primary antagonist.

An official excerpt from the book was released on January 31, 2023. The excerpt, taken from the beginning of the book, follows Cal Kestis as he works to infiltrate a base belonging to the Haxion Brood crime syndicate, a group he had previously encountered in Fallen Order.

== Reception ==
In a review for CNET, Sean Keane gave credit to author Sam Maggs' writing for sending Cal and the Stinger Mantis crew "on a tense adventure" that "infuses them with new depth". Bryan Young of /Film called Maggs "a strong writer" and the book's story "incredibly compelling". He wrote that the book is particularly appealing for anyone who has played Fallen Order, but also added that "there's nothing vital to the canon or the overarching story of 'Star Wars' that you're going to miss by not reading the book". Likewise, Star Wars News Net's Nate Manning viewed Maggs' writing as coming out of a deep love for Fallen Order, with the greatest strength of Battle Scars being its characterization of each member of the Mantis crew "as their own person with their own vision of the future". Manning gave the book a rating of 8/10.

== Editions ==
Paperback

- Maggs, Sam (2023). Star Wars Jedi: Battle Scars. London: Del Rey. ISBN 978-0-59-372267-1.

Hardback

- Maggs, Sam (2023). Star Wars Jedi: Battle Scars. New York: Random House Worlds. ISBN 9780593598603.
- Maggs, Sam (2023). Star Wars Jedi: Battle Scars. London: Cornerstone. ISBN 978-1-52-990756-8.

eBook

- Maggs, Sam (2023). Star Wars Jedi: Battle Scars. New York: Random House Worlds. ISBN 978-0-59-359861-0.
- Maggs, Sam (2023). Star Wars Jedi: Battle Scars. London: Cornerstone. ISBN 978-1-80-494441-7.

Audiobook

- Maggs, Sam (2023). Star Wars Jedi: Battle Scars. New York: Random House Audio. ISBN 978-0-59-368313-2.
