= Cameron Monaghan =

American actor and model (born 1993)

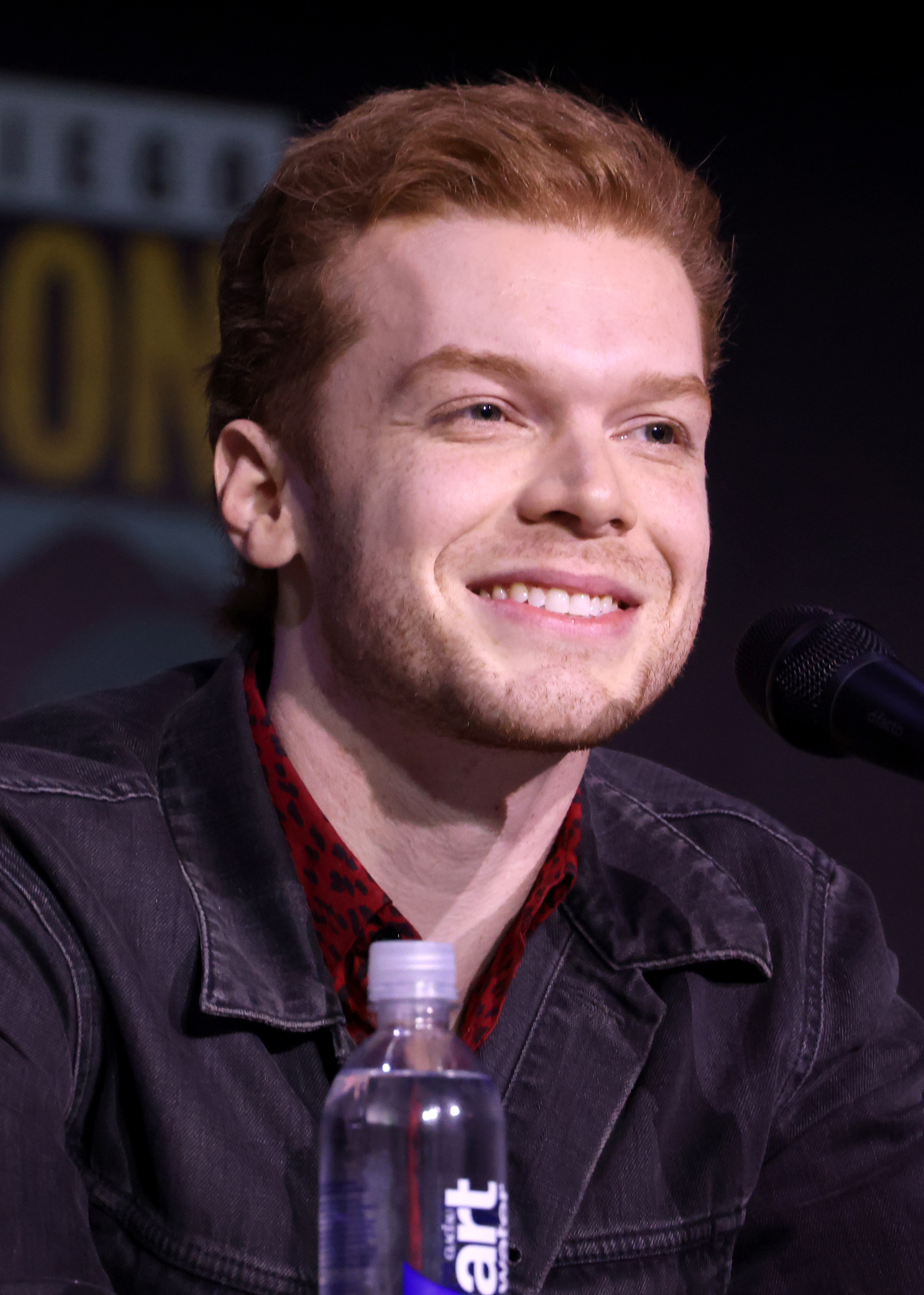
- Monaghan in 2025
- Born: Cameron Riley Monaghan; August 16, 1993 (age 33); Santa Monica, California, U.S.
- Occupations: Actor; model
- Years active: 2002–present
- Website: www.cameronmonaghan.net

Cameron Riley Monaghan (born August 16, 1993) is an American actor and model. The accolades he has received include nominations for a BAFTA Award and a Critics' Choice Television Award.

Monaghan is known for his role as Ian Gallagher on the Showtime comedy-drama series Shameless and as twins Jerome and Jeremiah Valeska, who serve as origins for the Joker, on the DC Comics-based TV series Gotham. He also portrayed Cal Kestis in the action-adventure game Star Wars Jedi: Fallen Order and its sequel Star Wars Jedi: Survivor. Monaghan began his career as a child model at the age of three and as a child actor at the age of seven.

== Early life ==
Monaghan was born on August 16, 1993, in Santa Monica, California, the only child of Diane Monaghan, an insurance claims specialist and single mother. He and his mother relocated to Boca Raton, Florida, shortly after his birth. Recognizing that Monaghan was an exceptionally outgoing child, his mother sent his picture to modeling agencies when he was three. He appeared on the cover of his first catalogue at the age of five and appeared in his first regional commercial at seven.

He attended Addison Mizner Elementary School and began to develop his acting skills by appearing in the Little Palm Children's Theatre's productions of Stuart Little, Winnie-the-Pooh, and The Pumpkin King (a theatrical adaptation of The Nightmare Before Christmas), as well as appearing as Alex in the small independent film The Wishing Stone, which was filmed in the Lake Worth, Florida area.

Monaghan moved to the Los Angeles area when he was approximately 10 years old.

== Career ==
=== Early career ===
Monaghan first came to national attention in 2003 for his role as Winthrop Paroo in the ABC television adaptation of The Music Man. When recounting the decision to cast the 9-year-old Monaghan, director and executive producer Jeff Bleckner explained, "There are some people, when you put them up on film, they sort of pop off the screen at you. That's how it was with Cameron. From the second we saw him, he was it. We were looking for anybody who had that wonderful appeal. And Cameron had it."

In 2004, Monaghan began a recurring role as Chad, one of Dewey's classmates on the Fox comedy series Malcolm in the Middle, which earned him the Young Artist Award as Best Young Television Actor in a Recurring Role. The following year, he began a recurring role as Palmer Noid on the Nickelodeon situation comedy Ned's Declassified School Survival Guide. Subsequent guest-starring television roles followed, including appearances on Criminal Minds, Numbers, The Mentalist, Monk, Three Rivers, Fringe, The Glades, and Terriers.

In 2005, Monaghan transitioned to theatrical film roles, appearing as Timmy in the independent western Brothers in Arms. The following year, he appeared as Kevin O'Doyle, the bothersome next-door neighbor in the fantasy comedy Click. A series of subsequent feature film roles followed, including appearances in The Santa Clause 3: The Escape Clause, Dog Gone, Safe Harbor and Another Harvest Moon, as well as portraying the boy detective Bob Andrews in the Three Investigators film series.

=== Shameless ===
In April 2010, Monaghan was cast as an ensemble cast member on the Showtime comedy-drama series Shameless. On the series, which premiered in January 2011, Monaghan portrays Ian Gallagher, the gay bipolar teenage son of a large dysfunctional Chicago family. Sarah Hughes of The Independent commended Monaghan's portrayal for providing "one of the more nuanced depictions of a gay teenager to be seen on US TV." Matthew Gilbert of The Boston Globe described Monaghan's performance as "extraordinary." The gay-interest media outlet AfterElton.com cited Monaghan's portrayal of Ian in naming him to its list of "2011's Break-Out TV Actors". In February 2014, Showtime announced it had renewed the series for a fifth season, scheduled to begin airing in 2015. For his work in the fifth season, Monaghan received a Critic's Choice Award nomination for Best Supporting Actor in a Comedy Series. The seventh season began airing in October 2016. The eighth season, consisting of 12 episodes, went into production in May 2017; it premiered on November 5, 2017. The series was renewed for a ninth season which premiered on September 9, 2018. Monaghan announced via Instagram that he would be leaving the series following the sixth episode of the ninth season. However, Cameron returned for the tenth season which premiered in late 2019.

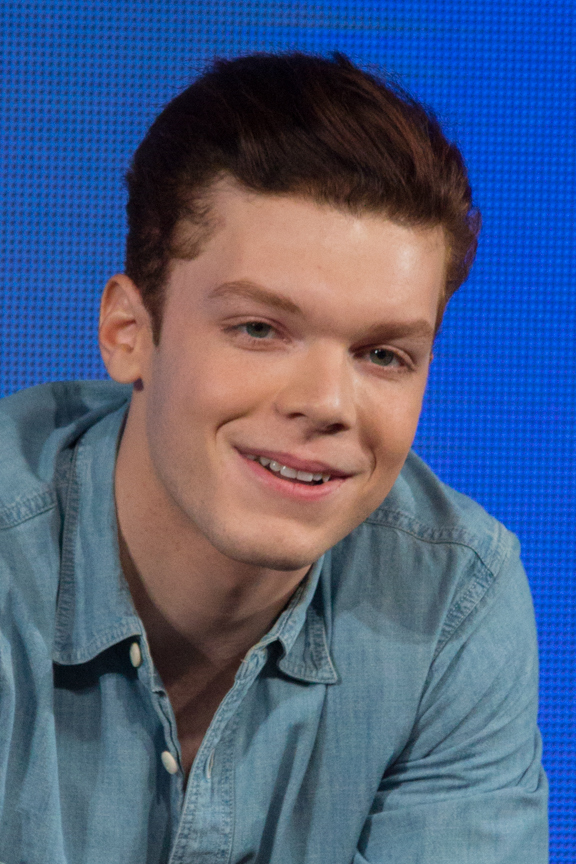
Cameron Monaghan at Nerd HQ panel for The Giver, 2014

=== 2011 to present ===
Monaghan appears in a variety of episodic television roles. In 2011, he guest-starred as Nick Peyton, a teenage boy accused of murdering his Marine father, on the CBS crime series NCIS. That same year he appeared as Jonathan McKenna on the TNT mystery series Rizzoli & Isles. In 2012, he guest-starred as Eddie Sandow, a 19-year-old who creates a hostage situation after his father is accused of sexual assault, on the NBC crime series Law & Order: Special Victims Unit.

Monaghan also appears in a variety of feature film roles. In 2011, he co-starred as high school sophomore Corey Doyle in the Disney teen drama Prom. In 2012, he portrayed Jake, the son of an attractive YMCA director in the sports themed comedy 2nd Serve. In 2014, Monaghan starred as Adam McCormick, a small-town high school athlete who becomes consumed by the death of one of his classmates in the independent drama Jamie Marks Is Dead. That same year, he appeared as Mason Ashford, the best friend and romantic interest to Rose in the fantasy adventure film Vampire Academy. He also starred as Asher in the dystopian film The Giver.

From 2015 to 2019, Monaghan was featured as a recurring guest star in all five seasons of Fox's DC Comics-based television series Gotham. He plays the antagonistic twin brothers Jerome and Jeremiah Valeska, who both serve origin stories for the famous Batman villain Joker.

Monaghan plays Cal Kestis, the player character in the 2019 video game Star Wars Jedi: Fallen Order, and its 2023 sequel, Star Wars Jedi: Survivor.

In July 2023, it was announced that Monaghan would join the cast of Tron: Ares alongside Jared Leto.

Monaghan will star as a younger version of Michael Connelly's character Harry Bosch in the MGM+ series Bosch: Start of Watch.

== Filmography ==
=== Film ===
Year	Title	Role	Notes
2002	The Wishing Stone	Alex	
2005	Brothers in Arms	Timmy	
2006	Click	Kevin O'Doyle	
2006	The Santa Clause 3: The Escape Clause	Traffic cop #1	
2007	The Three Investigators and the Secret of Skeleton Island	Bob Andrews	
2008	Dog Gone	Dexter	
2009	Safe Harbor	Larry Parker	
2009	The Three Investigators and the Secret of Terror Castle	Bob Andrews	
2010	Another Harvest Moon	Jack	
2011	Prom	Corey Doyle	
2012	2nd Serve	Jake	
2014	The Giver	Asher	
2014	Jamie Marks Is Dead	Adam McCormick	
2014	Mall	Jeff	
2014	Vampire Academy	Mason Ashford	
2017	Amityville: The Awakening	James Walker	
2017	The Year of Spectacular Men	Ross Wyatt	
2018	Anthem of a Teenage Prophet	Luke Hunter	
2019	Reign of the Supermen	Kon-El / Superboy (voice)	Direct-to-video
2021	DC Showcase: Kamandi: The Last Boy on Earth!	Kamandi (voice)	Short film; direct-to-video
2022	Shattered	Chris Decker	
2022	Paradise Highway	Finley Sterling	
2022	My Love Affair with Marriage	Sergei	
2025	Tron: Ares	Caius	

=== Television ===
Year	Title	Role	Notes
2003	The Music Man	Winthrop Paroo	Television film
2004–2005	Malcolm in the Middle	Chad	Recurring role
2005	Avatar: The Last Airbender	Poi, Ping (voice)	Episode: "The Fortuneteller"
2005	Threshold	Josh Foster	Episode: "Blood of the Children"
2005–2006	Ned's Declassified School Survival Guide	Palmer Noid	3 episodes
2006	Criminal Minds	Jeffrey Charles	Episode: "The Boogeyman"
2007	Shorty McShorts' Shorts	Andy (voice)	Episode: "Flip-Flopped"
2009	Fringe	Tyler Carson	Episode: "Of Human Action"
2009	The Mentalist	Elliot	Episode: "Blood Brothers"
2009	Monk	Danny Cooper	Episode: "Mr. Monk's Favorite Show"
2009	Numbers	Todd	Episode "Jacked"
2009	Safe Harbor	Larry Parker	Television film
2009	Three Rivers	Auden Drinkwater	Episode: "Place of Life"
2010	The Glades	Shane Conners	Episode: "Marriage is Murder"
2010	Terriers	Cody Grice	Episode: "Pimp Daddy"
2011	NCIS	Nick Peyton	Episode: "Out of the Frying Pan"
2011	Rizzoli & Isles	Jonathan McKenna	Episode: "Don't Hate the Player"
2011–2021	Shameless	Ian Gallagher	Main cast
2012	Law & Order: Special Victims Unit	Eddie Sandow	Episode: "Father's Shadow"
2015–2019	Gotham	Jerome and Jeremiah Valeska	Recurring role
2016	Mercy Street	Tom Fairfax	Main cast
2017	Son of Zorn	Jeff	Episode: "The Weekend Warrior"
2025	Lego Star Wars: Rebuild the Galaxy	Cal Kestis (voice)	2 episodes
2027	Bosch: Start of Watch	Harry Bosch	Main cast

=== Video games ===
Year	Title	Role	Notes
2019	Star Wars Jedi: Fallen Order	Cal Kestis	Voice, motion capture, and likeness
2023	Star Wars Jedi: Survivor	Cal Kestis	Voice, motion capture, and likeness
TBA	Untitled Star Wars Jedi: Survivor sequel	Cal Kestis	Voice, motion capture, and likeness

=== Web series ===
Year	Title	Role	Notes
2008	James Gunn's PG Porn	Young boy	Episode: "Helpful Bus"
2011	Corey & Lucas for the Win!	Corey Doyle	6 episodes
2020	Acting for a Cause	Ferris Bueller	Episode: "Ferris Bueller's Day Off"

=== Theatre ===
Year	Title	Role	Notes
2026	Rope	Garrett Stern	

== Awards and nominations ==
Year	Award	Category	Work	Result	Ref.
2004	Young Artist Award	Best Performance in a TV Movie, Miniseries or Special – Supporting Young Actor	The Music Man	Nominated	
2005	Young Artist Award	Best Performance in a Television Series – Recurring Young Actor	Malcolm in the Middle	Won	
2006	Young Artist Award	Best Performance in a Television Series – Guest Starring Young Actor	Ned's Declassified School Survival Guide	Nominated	
2012	Young Artist Award	Best Performance in a Television Series – Guest Starring Young Actor 18–21	Rizzoli & Isles	Nominated	
2015	Critics' Choice Television Awards	Best Supporting Actor in a Comedy Series	Shameless	Nominated	
2016	Teen Choice Awards	Choice TV: Villain	Gotham	Nominated	
2019	Teen Choice Awards	Choice TV: Villain	Gotham	Won	
2020	NAVGTR Awards	Performance in a Drama, Lead	Star Wars Jedi: Fallen Order	Nominated	
2023	Golden Joystick Awards	Best Lead Performer	Star Wars Jedi: Survivor	Nominated	
2023	The Game Awards	Best Performance	Star Wars Jedi: Survivor	Nominated	
2024	British Academy Games Awards	Performer in a Leading Role	Star Wars Jedi: Survivor	Nominated	
