= Star Wars Jedi: Fallen Order =

2019 video game

- Developer: Respawn Entertainment
- Publisher: Electronic Arts
- Director: Stig Asmussen
- Producers: Blair Brown; Jordan Klein; Paul Hatfield; Rhonda Cox; Colin Campbell
- Designers: Jason de Heras; Jeff Magers
- Programmer: Jiesang Song
- Artists: Ken Feldman; Chris Sutton
- Writers: Aaron Contreras; Chris Avellone
- Composers: Stephen Barton; Gordy Haab
- Series: Star Wars Jedi
- Engine: Unreal Engine 4
- Platforms: PlayStation 4; Windows; Xbox One; PlayStation 5; Xbox Series X/S
- Release: PS4, Windows, Xbox One; November 15, 2019; PS5, Xbox Series X/S; June 11, 2021
- Genre: Action-adventure
- Mode: Single-player

Star Wars Jedi: Fallen Order is a 2019 action-adventure game developed by Respawn Entertainment and published by Electronic Arts. The story is set in the Star Wars universe, five years after Star Wars: Episode III – Revenge of the Sith. It follows Cal Kestis, a Jedi Padawan who becomes a target of the Galactic Empire and is hunted throughout the galaxy by Imperial Inquisitors while attempting to complete his training, reconcile with his troubled past, and rebuild the fallen Jedi Order. The player can use Cal's lightsaber and Force powers to defeat enemies, including stormtroopers, wild beasts, and bounty hunters. The game adopts a Metroidvania-style level design where new areas are accessed as Cal unlocks skills and abilities.

Star Wars Jedi: Fallen Order was directed by Stig Asmussen, who joined Respawn in 2014. The game began development as an original title unrelated to Star Wars, but Electronic Arts felt the action would work well as a Star Wars game, convincing Lucasfilm to authorize and consult on the project. The game's visuals were influenced by Rogue One and Star Wars Rebels, while the combat and levels were inspired by Metroid Prime, Dark Souls, and The Legend of Zelda: The Wind Waker. The game's voice cast includes Cameron Monaghan as Cal Kestis and Debra Wilson as his mentor Cere Junda. Ben Burtt provided the voice for Cal's companion droid BD-1, while Forest Whitaker reprised his role from Rogue One as Saw Gerrera. The music, composed by Stephen Barton and Gordy Haab, was recorded at Abbey Road Studios with the London Symphony Orchestra and the Bach Choir of London.

Star Wars Jedi: Fallen Order was released for the PlayStation 4, Windows, and Xbox One in November 2019, and for the PlayStation 5 and Xbox Series X/S in June 2021. The game received generally favorable reviews from critics, who praised its combat, characters, performance, and world design, though it received criticisms for the technical issues at release. It sold over 10 million units by 2020. It was nominated for several end-of-the-year accolades, including Best Action/Adventure Game at The Game Awards 2020, and won several awards, including Adventure Game of the Year at the 23rd Annual D.I.C.E. Awards. A sequel, Star Wars Jedi: Survivor, was released in April 2023.

== Gameplay ==
In this screenshot, Cal Kestis, the game's protagonist, fights two AT-STs with his lightsaber.

Star Wars Jedi: Fallen Order is an action-adventure game played from a third-person perspective. The player can use their lightsaber to strike at enemies, or block incoming attacks. Blocking an attack depletes a character's block meter, opening them up to attack when the meter hits zero. If the player blocks just before an attack, this will parry the attack or deflect a projectile, causing their opponent's block meter to fall more quickly, opening them up for attack. Some enemies will glow red when they attempt to launch an unblockable attack. The player can either sidestep, dodge, or interrupt the attack by using Force abilities. The player has one lightsaber at the beginning of the game, and they can earn the ability to dual-wield lightsabers or use a double-bladed lightsaber later in the game.

The player has access to several Force powers, which are used in both combat and puzzle scenarios. The player begins the game with a "force slow" ability that slows down enemies, and slowly earns more force powers such as wall-run, double-jump, force-push, and force-pull, allowing them to reach previously inaccessible areas. The usage of these Force powers is governed by the Force meter, which will replenish when the player damages an enemy using regular attacks. As players progress in the game, they gain skill points which can be used to upgrade their combat skills, which are divided into three major categories: Survival, Lightsaber, and Force. Enemy types include wild beasts native to certain planets, as well as stormtroopers, droids, and Jedi-hunting Purge Troopers. The game's bosses include Inquisitors, bounty hunters, larger wild beasts, and large vehicles such as AT-STs. Some of the bosses are part of the main story, while others are optional. Throughout the game, the player is accompanied by a droid named BD-1. The droid helps the player access chests and terminals, as well as healing them using Stim Canisters.

The game adopts the "Metroidvania" style of exploration and progression. It features five major explorable planets that players can return to regularly: Bogano, Zeffo, Kashyyyk, Dathomir and Ilum. The starship Stinger Mantis serves as the small hub area where the player can talk to non-playable characters, and is used to travel between planets. On each planet, the locations are interconnected, and players can find shortcuts to traverse areas more quickly. Many areas can only be accessed once the player unlocks new abilities or items. When requested, BD-1 projects a holographic map of the planet, including the location of the player's objectives. Doors that can be opened are highlighted in green, and gates that cannot be opened yet are highlighted in red. As the player explores different locations, BD-1 occasionally requests to scan items, granting players a small amount of experience points. Exploration reveals chests, which unlock cosmetic items that change the appearance of the player, their ship, and BD-1. The player can find "essence" items that give a permanent increases to their health or Force meter, as well as "echoes" that reveal more of the game's story. BD-1 can be upgraded to help with navigation and combat, though some upgrades can be easily missed. Each level contains "meditation circles" where the player can save the game, spend skill points to update their character, refill Stim Canisters, and rest to recover health, healing items, and force energy. However, resting causes all enemies to respawn. Dying in battle costs players experience points, though lost XP can be regained by damaging the opponent that has previously killed the player.

With the addition of a Star Wars Day update released in 2020, players can access the Meditation Arena through the meditation circles. The arena offers combat challenges where the player fights waves of enemies based on locations from the main game. Completing a challenge awards the player with up to three stars, based on the player's health. These stars can be used to unlock cosmetic changes for BD-1. The Meditation Arena includes a battle grid, where players can select their abilities and opponents for a custom challenge.

== Synopsis ==
=== Setting and characters ===
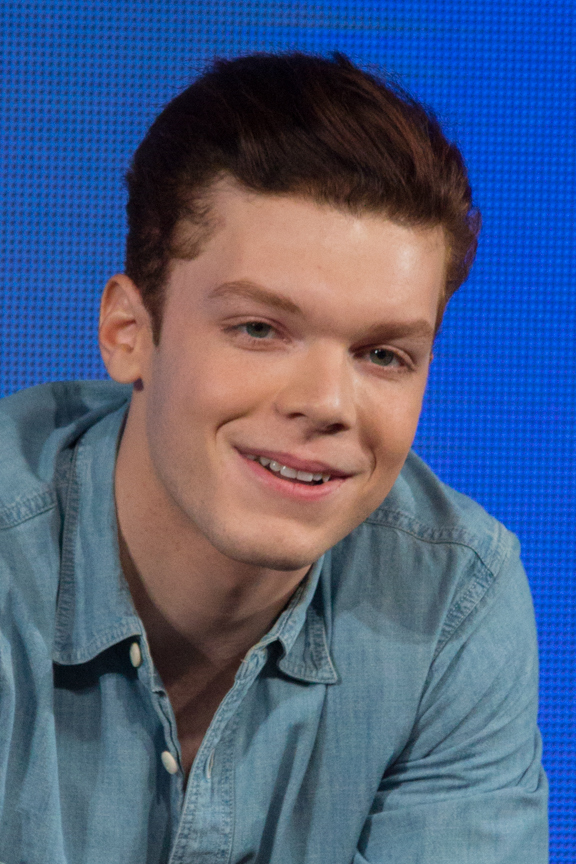
Cameron Monaghan

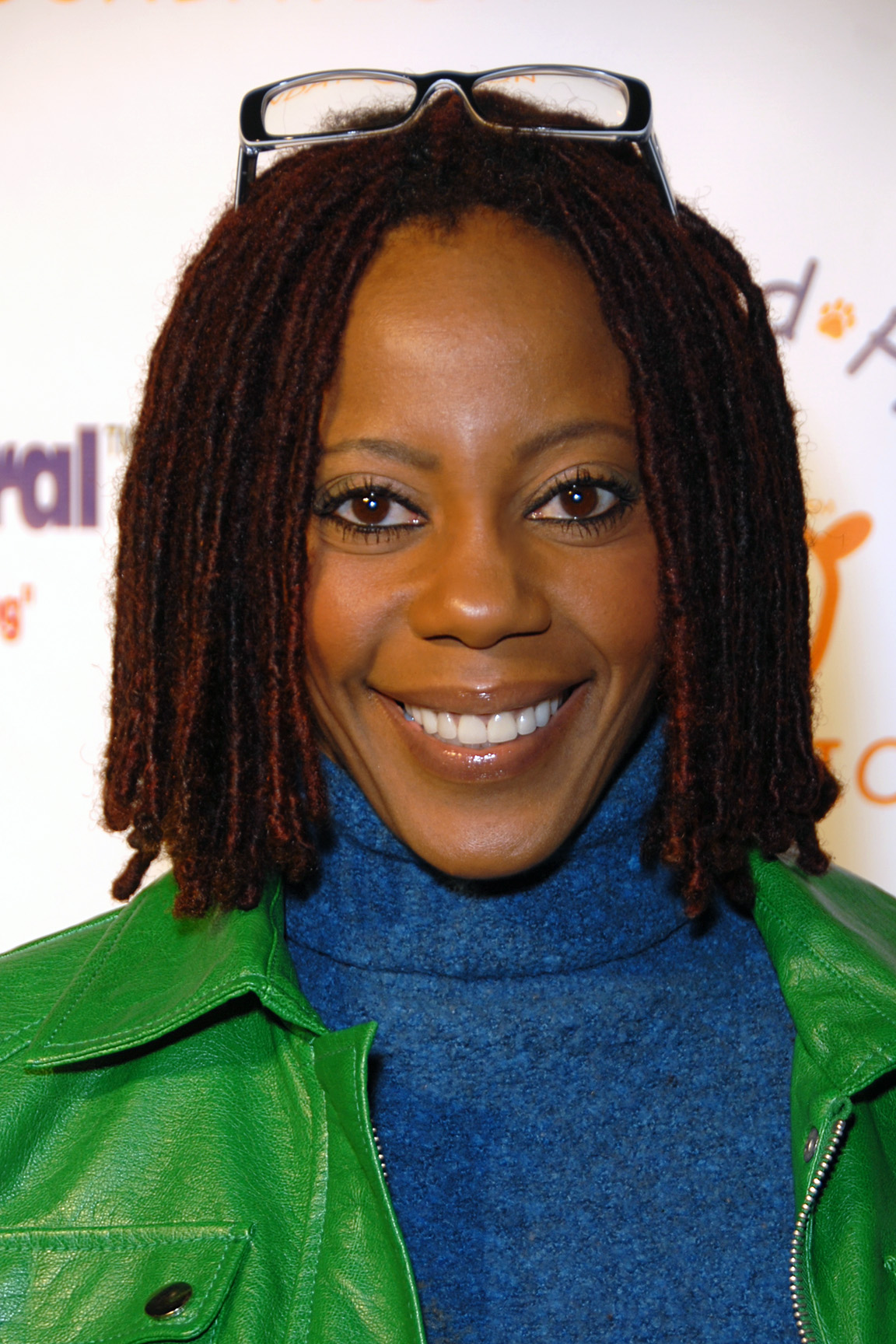
Debra Wilson

Monaghan and Wilson did voice work and motion capture as Cal Kestis and Cere Junda, respectively.

Star Wars Jedi: Fallen Order takes place five years after the events of Star Wars: Episode III – Revenge of the Sith, in which the democratic Galactic Republic was replaced by the totalitarian Galactic Empire, which effectively controls the galaxy and oversaw the near-extermination of the Republic's peacekeepers, the Jedi Order. The game follows Jedi Padawan Cal Kestis (Cameron Monaghan), one of the few survivors of the Empire's Great Jedi Purge, who embarks on a mission to try and rebuild the Jedi Order while being hunted by the Second Sister (Elizabeth Grullón) and her partner, the Ninth Sister (Misty Lee), both trained by the Sith Lord Darth Vader (Scott Lawrence) as part of the Imperial Inquisitorius program. They were first introduced in Marvel Comics' comic book series, Star Wars: Darth Vader – Dark Lord of the Sith.

During his journey, Cal is joined by several allies, including former Jedi Knight-turned-mercenary Cere Junda (Debra Wilson); her friend Greez Dritus (Daniel Roebuck), owner and pilot of the Stinger Mantis; BD-1 (Ben Burtt), a small droid previously owned by Jedi Master Eno Cordova (Tony Amendola); and Merrin (Tina Ivlev), one of the last surviving members of the Nightsister clan of Dathomir. Other characters include Saw Gerrera (Forest Whitaker), the leader of the Partisan rebel movement against the Empire that was featured in previous Star Wars media; Dark Jedi Taron Malicos (Liam McIntyre), who usurped leadership of Dathomir; Wookiee chieftain Tarfful, who leads the Wookiee resistance against the Empire and first appeared in Revenge of the Sith; and Cal's former Jedi Master, Jaro Tapal (Travis Willingham), who is featured in flashbacks alongside several clone troopers (Dee Bradley Baker).

=== Plot ===
Five years after the Republic's conversion into the Empire and the Great Jedi Purge, former Padawan Cal Kestis is hiding from the Empire on the planet Bracca, where he works as a scrapper salvaging ships from the Clone Wars. An Imperial probe catches Cal using the Force to save his friend Prauf, and two Inquisitors—the Second Sister and the Ninth Sister—are sent to capture the Jedi. After the Second Sister kills Prauf for speaking up against the Empire, Cal escapes. He is rescued by former Jedi Knight Cere Junda and pilot Greez Dritus, who transport him on their ship, the Stinger Mantis.

Cere takes Cal to the planet Bogano in the hopes that he can access an ancient vault. On the way to the vault, Cal befriends a small droid named BD-1, who shows him a message from Cere's former Jedi Master, Eno Cordova. It reveals that the vault was built by an ancient civilization called the Zeffo and that a Jedi Holocron containing a list of Force-sensitive children was hidden inside by Cordova. Cere believes the list could help rebuild the Jedi Order, but the only way to access the vault is by following Cordova's path. Cal heads to the Zeffo homeworld and explores an ancient temple, finding a clue pointing to Cordova's friend, the Wookiee chieftain Tarfful. Heading to Kashyyyk, Cal encounters notorious insurgent Saw Gerrera, whose Partisans are aiding the local Wookiee resistance. Cal helps Saw liberate an Imperial slave labour camp in exchange for arranging a meeting with Tarfful.

Unable to locate Tarfful, Cal revisits Zeffo in search of additional clues but is unexpectedly ambushed by the Second Sister, who unveils herself as Trilla Suduri, Cere's former Padawan. Trilla explains her capture by the Empire after Cere's betrayal under torture, and warns Cal that Cere will inevitably betray him as well. Cal discovers the necessity of a Zeffo artifact known as an Astrium to access the vault, but is captured by a bounty hunter working for the Haxion Brood crime syndicate over Greez's debts to them, forcing him into a gladiatorial arena owned by the Haxion boss, Sorc Tormo. Following a rescue mission by Cere and Greez, Cal returns to Kashyyyk, where Tarfful instructs him to investigate the pinnacle of the Origin Tree. There, Cal uncovers another recording by Cordova, revealing the presence of an Astrium within a Zeffo tomb on Dathomir, but his exploration is interrupted by an encounter with the Ninth Sister, whom he defeats.

On Dathomir, Cal's progress is impeded by an army of revenants led by Nightsister Merrin, who blames the Jedi for the massacre of her people during the Clone Wars. Cal has a flashback of his former master Jaro Tapal sacrificing himself to protect Cal during Order 66, unconsciously destroying his lightsaber's kyber crystal in the process. He meets former Jedi Taron Malicos, who crash-landed on Dathomir during the Purge and succumbed to the dark side of the Force, usurping leadership of the planet. Malicos seeks to learn the Nightsisters' magic and tries to tempt Cal to the dark side, but the latter refuses and flees after Merrin attacks them both. Aboard the Stinger Mantis, Cere admits she cut her connection to the Force after briefly falling to the dark side upon learning Trilla became an Inquisitor. After traveling to Ilum to rebuild his lightsaber, Cal returns to Dathomir, where he retrieves the Astrium and overcomes his guilt over Tapal's death. He then defeats Malicos with the unexpected aid of Merrin, who agrees to join the Stinger Mantis crew.

Back on Bogano, Cal unlocks the vault, experiencing a vision where he rebuilds the Jedi Order, but they are defeated and tortured by the Empire, which he eventually joins. After escaping the vision, Trilla attacks him and steals the Holocron. Cere reassumes her role as a Jedi and knights Cal before they infiltrate the Fortress Inquisitorius on Mustafar's oceanic moon Nur to recover the Holocron. After battling their way through a company of stormtroopers, they reach Trilla, whom Cal defeats, taking back the Holocron. Cere reconciles with Trilla, but before the latter can be fully redeemed, Darth Vader suddenly appears and kills Trilla for her failure. Unable to defeat Vader, Cal and Cere barely escape from his grasp and are saved from drowning by Merrin. The crew celebrates their success on the Stinger Mantis, until they realize that the children listed on the Holocron will only be in more danger if they become Jedi. Cal destroys the Holocron with his lightsaber and asks his crew where they should go next.

== Development ==
=== Background ===
Following his exit from Sony's Santa Monica Studio, Stig Asmussen, who had previously directed God of War III, joined Respawn Entertainment in 2014. He served as the studio's game director, leading the studio's second development team while the first development team was working on the Titanfall games. Prior to the game's development, Respawn discussed the possibility of making a Star Wars game with publisher Electronic Arts (EA), who controlled an exclusive license from Lucasfilm to develop new Star Wars games. This plan did not go through. When this plan did not go through, Respawn began development on an original game concept, and EA felt the project could work well as a Star Wars game. As owner of the Star Wars intellectual property, Lucasfilm was protective of the Jedi as a "sacred" part of the franchise and encouraged Respawn to make a shooter game about a smuggler or bounty hunter. However, Asmussen pushed back with his vision, convincing Lucasfilm to focus on a game with Jedi and lightsaber combat. Lucasfilm would continue to check in with Asmussen and Respawn, ensuring the game's fidelity to the Star Wars setting. Visually, the game was heavily inspired by Rogue One and Solo. The team also took inspirations from Star Wars Rebels, which took place in the same period.

=== Narrative ===
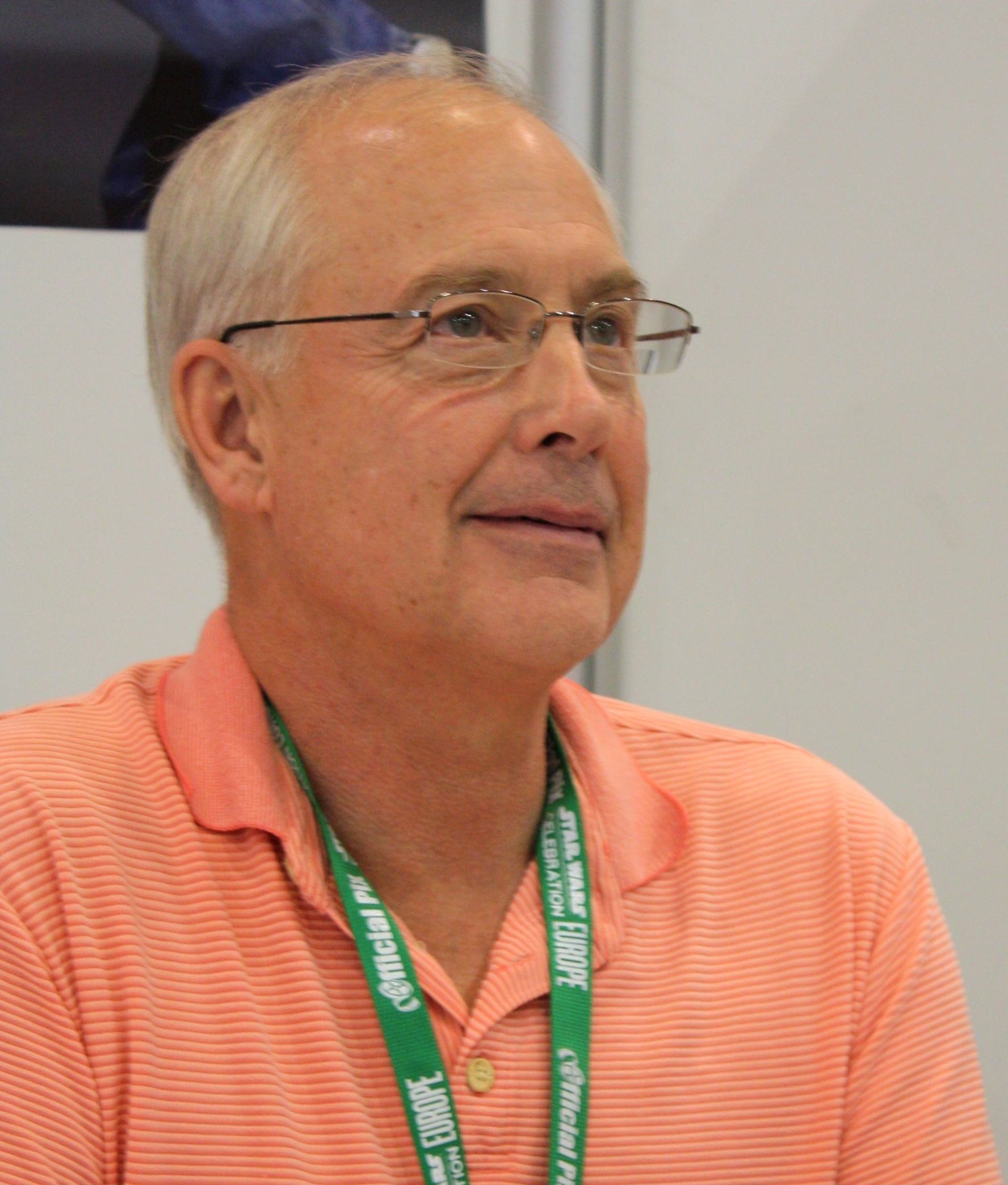
The team collaborated with Ben Burtt while creating the sound effects for Cal's companion droid BD-1.

Aaron Contreras led the game's writing team, which included Chris Avellone and several writers experienced with the Star Wars setting from their work on Star Wars: The Clone Wars and Rebels. The team wanted to develop a story between the events of Revenge of the Sith and A New Hope, to explore recognizable Star Wars elements that had been under-utilized in other media. Level designer Jeff Magers described the events after Episode III as "a perfect place for a video game hero, as a flickering candle of light in a very dark place". The team wanted to evoke feelings of the Star Wars original trilogy, while creating an "authentic" Jedi story and a classic hero's journey. At the beginning of the game, Cal Kestis is not yet a Jedi, as his training ended abruptly as the Jedi were purged during Order 66. Fallen Order, therefore, was envisioned as a "David and Goliath story", focusing on "the classic battle of good versus evil". Asmussen and Contreras also wanted a mythology to provide a historical context and explain the Jedi's downfall, which led them to come up with Eno Cordova and the Zeffo, the latter of whom paralleled Ancient Egypt with their similar mistakes.

The MacGuffin changed a couple of times, being a lost starship or Inquisitor's secret prisons at one point, before becoming a Holocron. The writing team described "trauma" as one of the main themes, telling a story about how people react in moments of desperation. This was reflected through Cal's growing confidence in his abilities, and his gradual trust of his companions as they resist the Empire. Another broad theme was "survival", but most importantly "letting go", where the main characters learn to trust the Force and let destiny work itself out by doing the right thing instead of putting everything under their control like the Empire does through oppression; this culminates with them destroying the Holocron. Cameron Monaghan provided voice and motion capture for Cal. The team chose a human protagonist, believing he would be more relatable than an alien, and also decided he should be male to differentiate from Rey, the female lead in the Star Wars sequel trilogy. Cal's original name was going to be "Boone", as the creative team looked to the Western genre for inspiration. He was also envisioned to be an "untrusting" and "laconic" character. Elizabeth Grullon provided the voice and motion capture for the Second Sister. The character's British accent was improvised during the recording sessions as she "had a strong intuition" that Trilla had a British dialect when she first read the script. The character, along with the Ninth Sister, first appeared in the Marvel comic series Darth Vader: Dark Lord of the Sith. The team chose characters and planets so long as they were meaningful and unique to their story, resulting in the team scrapping visits to a number of Star Wars planets such as Hoth and Mustafar and removing an appearance by the Grand Inquisitor in the story.

The ship Stinger Mantis was designed by Star Wars artist Doug Chiang. Its captain Greez Dritus belongs to a new alien species made for Fallen Order. According to Asmussen, the character was inspired by "John C. Reilly and Mr. Furley from Three's Company". BD-1 took two years to design. Throughout the game, Cal gradually bonded with BD-1, a relationship which Asmussen compared to that of Charlie Brown and his animal companions Snoopy and Woodstock. The droid was initially codenamed "bird dog", as its design was reminiscent of a bird, while having the personality of a dog. As a companion robot, Respawn designed it to be very "personable", and described it as Cal's best friend. The team initially designed a bolster for BD-1 so he could fly around, but later settled for a bipedal design because they wanted him to be an exploration droid. It has a pair of big eyes, which allow him to scan different objects and project a map hologram. The team initially brainstormed about giving the droid lines of dialogue, though ultimately decided to work with Ben Burtt to create its beeping sounds. Cal was initially envisioned as a "tinkerer" who would create BD-1 from scraps, and BD-1 would serve as Cal's backpack. This idea was later abandoned. BD-1's early design was reminiscent of BB-8 from the sequel trilogy, and the team decided to change it once they saw the trailer for The Force Awakens. Purge Troopers were created in conjunction with Marvel Comics. While they were first seen in the abovementioned Dark Lord of the Sith comic book series, Fallen Order would mark their first appearance as enemy combatants.

=== Gameplay ===
Respawn wanted players to explore the world without needing excessive guidance. The team was inspired by the design of Metroid Prime, in particular how frequent new upgrades are offered to players. The team believed that the game's Metroidvania structure enabled players to explore each location freely, while allowing the team to deliver occasional handcrafted moments. "Re-traversal" was one of the game's core design pillars. The Force powers, in particular, were described as "lock-and-key mechanisms" which can be used to solve puzzles and unlock secret areas. The game's Metroidvania design further reflected Cal's narrative growth as a character as he became more confident in himself and his connection with the Force. The game does not feature a fast travel system, as the team believed that players would explore each location more thoroughly and look for shortcuts when they are not allowed to skip through the critical path.

The combat of the game was described to be "thoughtful" and "methodical". The team decided early in development that Jedi warriors focus on "precision and efficiency". It was not combo-based, as the team did not want players to mash buttons. Instead, the game was about striking at enemies and using Force abilities at the right moments and catching enemies off guard. The player must study an opponent's move set and react to them accordingly with different tactics and timing of attack. To stay true to the Star Wars universe, Cal can kill stormtroopers with one hit using his lightsaber. To make the combat more challenging, some enemies were designed with natural armor, and others were given a Block meter. To balance between challenging and accessible gameplay, the team looked for a middle ground between Metroid, The Legend of Zelda: The Wind Waker, and games developed by FromSoftware such as Bloodborne and Dark Souls. In particular, the team did not want the game to be unforgiving or punishing. The team introduced difficulty modes that mainly change enemy aggression, as well as the player's parry timing and health loss. Even in the most difficult game mode, the design team wanted Cal's weapons to deliver lethal damage. As moments of dismemberment were rare in the Star Wars films, Lucasfilm and Respawn agreed that the game would not feature human dismemberment.

=== Music ===
Gordy Haab and Stephen Barton served as the game's composers. The former had previously composed the scores for Star Wars: The Old Republic and Star Wars: Battlefront while the latter had collaborated with the studio on the Titanfall, Uncharted, and Apex Legends. The score was recorded at Abbey Road Studios with the London Symphony Orchestra and the Bach Choir of London. According to the game's audio director Nick Laviers, the game's music was designed to evoke those from the original film trilogy, being both "futuristic" while having a "1970s, warm and familiar technology vibe". Haab described the score of the game as "dark", with some songs bordering on "gothic horror". The team felt that Cal's theme was challenging to create, since they did not want to foreshadow too much of his character development and his heroic journey. Haab intentionally avoided listening to established Star Wars music in order to create something new for Fallen Order. A soundtrack album for the game was released on August 21, 2020. It is over 3 hours long and it was produced by the composers Barton and Haab, Nick Laviers, Alan Meyerson, and Electronic Arts President of Music Steve Schnur. Mongolian folk metal band The Hu wrote and recorded a song, "Sugaan Essena", which featured prominently in the game. The song lyrics were written in Mongolian, then translated into a fictional Star Wars language.

== Release ==
The project was revealed by publisher Electronic Arts to be a third-person action-adventure game set in the Star Wars universe in May 2016. Publisher Electronic Arts announced the game at E3 2018, At E3 2019, Electronic Arts showcased a 15-minute demo of the game. The game's development was completed on October 18, 2019, with Respawn confirming it had been declared gold, indicating it was being prepared for duplication and release. It was released for PlayStation 4, Windows, and Xbox One on November 15, 2019, a month before the theatrical release of Star Wars: The Rise of Skywalker. The release of Star Wars Jedi: Fallen Order marked EA's return to Steam, eight years after releasing games exclusively on its own Origin platform. The game was released in two editions: a Standard Edition, and a Deluxe Edition. The Deluxe Edition featured exclusive skins for BD-1 and the Stinger Mantis, a digital artbook, and a "Director's Cut" behind-the-scenes video. One of these cosmetics that were available through pre-ordering the game, the orange lightsaber crystal, was later made available through an update to all players. At launch, the game received criticisms for its abundance of software bugs. Respawn once considered delaying the title to further polish it, but ultimately decided to release the game during the holiday season.

A Stadia version was released on November 24, 2020. A photo mode for the game was added in December 2019. On January 12, 2021, a free update was released that improved performance when running the game with backwards compatibility on PlayStation 5 and Xbox Series X/S. Native versions for the PlayStation 5 and Xbox Series X/S were released on June 11, 2021. The new versions improved the game's technical performance and stability, added support for higher resolutions, and vastly improved loading times. The update was free to those who owned either the PlayStation 4 or Xbox One versions of the game. A free update with new cosmetics, game modes, and combat challenges was released on May 4, 2020, coinciding with Star Wars Day.

=== Tie-in media ===
In September 2019, Marvel Comics published a tie-in comic prequel series, Star Wars Jedi: Fallen Order – Dark Temple. Written by Matthew Rosenberg and illustrated by Paolo Villanelli, it follows Cere and her master Eno Cordova as they explore the planet Ontotho. In December 2019, Respawn added an outfit based on BD-1 to its online battle royale video game Apex Legends. Hasbro produced three figures in the Star Wars: The Black Series range for Cal Kestis (and BD-1), the Second Sister, and a Purge Stormtrooper, with this selection of designs being adapted by Funko into Funko Pop! figures. Starting from March 2022, Cal's lightsaber hilt can be purchased at Dok-Ondar's Den of Antiquities in Star Wars: Galaxy's Edge in Disneyland Resort, and Disney's Hollywood Studios after winning a fan poll in 2020. At Star Wars Celebration 2022, Lego revealed a BD-1 Lego model based on the game. In the subsequent 2025 Star Wars Celebration in Chiba, Japan, a manga adaptation of the game was announced.

== Reception ==
=== Critical response ===
Reception

Aggregate score
Aggregator	Score
Metacritic	PC: 81/100; PS4: 79/100; XONE: 81/100

Review scores
Publication	Score
Game Informer	8.75/10
GameSpot	8/10
GamesRadar+	4/5
Giant Bomb	3/5
IGN	9/10
PC Gamer (US)	73/100
USgamer	3.5/5
VentureBeat	93/100
VG247	4/5

Star Wars Jedi: Fallen Order received "generally favorable" reviews from critics, according to review aggregator website Metacritic. Critics liked the game for being a self-contained Star Wars single-player title, and felt that Fallen Order had successfully combined distinct systems from multiple game genres together. Many reviewers noted the game's subpar technical performance. The success of Star Wars Jedi: Fallen Order, alongside Marvel's Spider-Man, prompted Disney to encourage game developers to make more original games based on its properties.

The exploration aspect of the game was widely praised. Andrew Reiner from Game Informer described it as the game's "most dynamic and entertaining quality," though he felt some locations were designed in a "gamey" way that harmed immersion. He disliked sometimes having to revisit planets due to unimaginative narrative reasons. Hornshaw noted that each planet featured in the game was beautifully realized, and added that players were always well-rewarded for exploring off the beaten path. Ben Tyrer from GamesRadar praised the game's many locations as "intriguing", and compared the puzzles favorably to Tomb Raider. Stepleton applauded the team for their "attention to detail" and their devotion to stay true to the source materials, though he remarked the in-game Wookiees were "offensively ugly". Brad Shoemaker from Giant Bomb disliked the lack of a fast travel option for making exploration a "chore" early in the game. Tom Senior from PC Gamer described the game's locations as "massive, tangled dungeon with a good mix of gorgeous exteriors and atmospheric Imperial bases", but he noted that the third-person exploration gameplay was "old-fashioned".

The combat was praised by critics. Reiner noted each swing of the lightsaber felt impactful and each combat encounter was an intense experience. Hornshaw and Senior lauded the difficult nature of the game, likening it to Sekiro: Shadows Die Twice. Hornshaw further added that each combat encounter can be an "exciting, cerebral exercise" because enemies can easily defeat the player. Both remarked that despite its challenging gameplay, it was rewarding enough for players to feel like they are controlling a powerful Jedi knight. He enjoyed the game for not giving Cal too much power, which in turn, made the Empire a "frightening threat" due to the differences in power level between the two. Tyrer remarked that the game was "demanding" but not "punishing" and praised the difficulty options for allowing players to fine tune their experience. VG247's Sherif Saed felt that the parrying mechanics were sometimes inconsistent and frustrating, and criticized several combat encounters where players are overwhelmed by too many enemies.

Reiner praised Cal as the game's protagonist and applauded the relationship between him and BD-1, likening the droid to a "friendly lapdog". He liked the story for its pacing and mystique and praised the flashback scenes for their character development. Phil Hornshaw from GameSpot also praised the droid's gameplay presence, which made it an inseparable part of the game. He enjoyed the narrative of the game, though he felt that it only started to excel when it began exploring the deepening friendship between Cal and the game's supporting characters. Cal was generally well-liked by critics, and the game's cast of supporting characters including Cere and Trilla also received praise. While Grubb praised the game's writing, he was disappointed that the story was a typical Star Wars story about light versus dark. Kat Bailey, writing for USgamer, added that the story progressed at a "breakneck speed", though she applauded the story's dark moments.

=== Sales ===
In Japan, the PlayStation 4 version of Star Wars Jedi: Fallen Order sold 26,761 units within its first week on sale, which made it the fifth best-selling retail game of the week. In the United Kingdom, it was the second best-selling retail game during its first week on sale, behind Pokémon Sword and Shield, with 66% of sales being for the PlayStation 4 version and the remaining 34% for the Xbox One version. It had the fourth most successful UK launch for a video game physical release in 2019. In the United States, it was the second best-selling game in November and December 2019, only behind the Call of Duty: Modern Warfare reboot. With only two months of sales, it was still the sixth best-selling game of the year in the US, and Respawn's most profitable premium title of all-time.

Electronic Arts confirmed that Star Wars Jedi: Fallen Order had the fastest-selling digital launch for any Star Wars game within its first two weeks on sale. The game sold over 8 million units by the end of January 2020, exceeding EA's expectations. Over 10 million units were sold by the end of March 2020. By June 2021, the game had attracted over 20 million players.

=== Awards ===
Year	Award	Category	Result	Ref.
2019	Game Critics Awards	Best of Show	Nominated	
2019	Game Critics Awards	Best Console Game	Nominated	
2019	Game Critics Awards	Best Action/Adventure Game	Nominated	
2019	Titanium Awards	Game of the Year	Won	
2019	Titanium Awards	Best Game Design	Won	
2019	Titanium Awards	Best Adventure Game	Won	
2020	New York Game Awards	Great White Way Award for Best Acting in a Game (Debra Wilson)	Nominated	
2020	Guild of Music Supervisors Awards	Best Music Supervision in a Video Game	Nominated	
2020	23rd Annual D.I.C.E. Awards	Adventure Game of the Year	Won	
2020	23rd Annual D.I.C.E. Awards	Outstanding Achievement in Character (Greez)	Nominated	
2020	NAVGTR Awards	Art Direction, Fantasy	Nominated	
2020	NAVGTR Awards	Direction in a Game Cinema	Nominated	
2020	NAVGTR Awards	Game, Franchise Action	Won	
2020	NAVGTR Awards	Performance in a Drama, Lead (Cameron Monaghan)	Nominated	
2020	NAVGTR Awards	Performance in a Drama, Supporting (Debra Wilson)	Nominated	
2020	NAVGTR Awards	Sound Editing in a Game Cinema	Nominated	
2020	NAVGTR Awards	Sound Effects	Won	
2020	Pégases Awards 2020	Best International Game	Nominated	
2020	SXSW Gaming Awards	Video Game of the Year	Nominated	
2020	SXSW Gaming Awards	Excellence in Gameplay	Nominated	
2020	SXSW Gaming Awards	Excellence in SFX	Won	
2020	SXSW Gaming Awards	Excellence in Visual Achievement	Nominated	
2020	16th British Academy Games Awards	Audio Achievement	Nominated	
2020	16th British Academy Games Awards	Narrative	Nominated	
2020	18th Annual G.A.N.G. Awards	Audio of the Year	Nominated	
2020	18th Annual G.A.N.G. Awards	Music of the Year	Won	
2020	18th Annual G.A.N.G. Awards	Sound Design of the Year	Nominated	
2020	18th Annual G.A.N.G. Awards	Best Cinematic Cutscene Audio	Nominated	
2020	18th Annual G.A.N.G. Awards	Best Dialogue	Nominated	
2020	18th Annual G.A.N.G. Awards	Best Original Instrumental	Nominated	
2020	18th Annual G.A.N.G. Awards	Best Original Choral Composition ("Cordova's Theme")	Won	
2020	18th Annual G.A.N.G. Awards	Best Audio Mix	Nominated	
2020	ASCAP Composers' Choice Awards	Video Game Score of the Year	Won	
2020	The Game Awards 2020	Best Action/Adventure Game	Nominated	
2020	Society of Composers & Lyricists Award	Outstanding Original Score for Interactive Media	Won	

== Sequel ==
In January 2022, Respawn confirmed it was developing a sequel to Fallen Order, with Stig Asmussen returning as director. Titled Star Wars Jedi: Survivor, it was unveiled in May and was released in April 2023 for PlayStation 5, Windows, and Xbox Series X/S. Respawn collaborated with Lucasfilm Games for this sequel, which is set five years after Fallen Order.

A tie-in novel titled Star Wars Jedi: Battle Scars was released on March 7, 2023. The book was written by Sam Maggs, and bridges the events between Fallen Order and Survivor.
