= Stig Asmussen =

American video game developer (born 1972)

- Born: September 13, 1972 (age 54)
- Education: The Art Institute of Pittsburgh
- Occupations: Creative director; game artist; game writer
- Years active: 1999–present
- Employer(s): Midway Games (1999–2003); Sony Computer Entertainment (2003–2014); Respawn Entertainment (2014–2023); Giant Skull (2024–present)
- Notable work: God of War III; Star Wars Jedi: Fallen Order; Star Wars Jedi: Survivor
- Awards: BAFTA Best Artistic Achievement (2011)

Stig Asmussen is an American video game developer, best known for his work on the God of War series for Santa Monica Studio and the Star Wars Jedi series for Respawn Entertainment. Stig Asmussen founded his own new AAA video game development studio Giant Skull in 2023 September 9.

== Biography ==
Asmussen graduated from The Art Institute of Pittsburgh in 1998, with an Associate of Specialized Technology in Computer Animation Media. He is the son of Jes Asmussen, University Distinguished Professor and Executive Director of the Fraunhofer Center for Coatings and Laser Applications at Michigan State University.

Throughout the God of War series, he worked as a lead environment artist, art director, and was game director of God of War III after Cory Barlog's departure. In 2011, Stig Asmussen won the BAFTA Best Artistic Achievement Award for his work on God of War III. In an interview in April 2012, according to David Jaffe (creator of God of War), Asmussen was "doing cool stuff" at Santa Monica, and did not work on God of War: Ascension.

In 2014, Asmussen left Santa Monica Studio. He has since joined Respawn Entertainment as a game director. On May 4, 2016 – Star Wars Day – Asmussen announced Respawn Entertainment was making a third-person Star Wars game. This was announced as Star Wars Jedi: Fallen Order. In 2022, Stig Asmussen announced a sequel to Star Wars Jedi: Fallen Order, Star Wars Jedi: Survivor. Asmussen left EA on September 13, 2023, five months after Star Wars Jedi: Survivor released.

In 2024, Asmussen announced the founding of a new independent AAA video game studio, named Giant Skull. In addition to Asmussen, Giant Skull consists of lead producer Lauren McLemore, art director Patrick Murphy, CTO Jon Carr, design director Jeff Magers, animation director Brian Campbell, and COO/CFO Anthony Scott, alongside undisclosed talent from Rockstar Games. Asmussen revealed that the studio was developing a new AAA single-player game built on Unreal Engine 5, which was revealed in 2025 to be a licensed Dungeons & Dragons game, however Hasbro cancelled the project by May 2026.

== Works ==
Year	Title	Director	Writer	Artist	Notes	Studio
1999	Gauntlet: Dark Legacy	No	No	Yes	3D artist	Midway Games
2002	Dr. Muto	No	No	Yes	Lead level artist	Midway Games
2005	God of War	No	No	Yes	Lead environment artist	Santa Monica Studio
2007	God of War II	No	No	Yes	Art director	Santa Monica Studio
2008	God of War: Chains of Olympus	No	No	Yes	Art director	Ready at Dawn
2010	God of War III	Yes	Add.	No	Creative director (Santa Monica Studio)	Santa Monica Studio
2011	Mortal Kombat	Add.	No	No		NetherRealm Studios
2013	God of War: Ascension	No	No	Add.	Additional art support	Santa Monica Studio
2019	Star Wars Jedi: Fallen Order	Yes	Story	No	Game director	Respawn Entertainment
2023	Star Wars Jedi: Survivor	Yes	Story	No	Game director	Respawn Entertainment
