= High Republic =

High Republic may refer to:

- High Republic of Heldon, a fictional eugenic mutant-killing polity from Lord of the Swastika, a fictional novel in the 1972 Norman Spinrad alternate history novel The Iron Dream.
- Star Wars: The High Republic, a subfranchise of the Star Wars media franchise set in the era of the same name, first introduced in 2020
- The High Republic [philosophy] (Russian: Вищу Республіку, romanized: Vyshchu Respubliku), a construct of faith, society, and politics, under the Christian church, developed in the 18th century by Gregory Skovoroda

== See also ==
- Republic (disambiguation)
- High (disambiguation)
