= God Is an Astronaut discography =

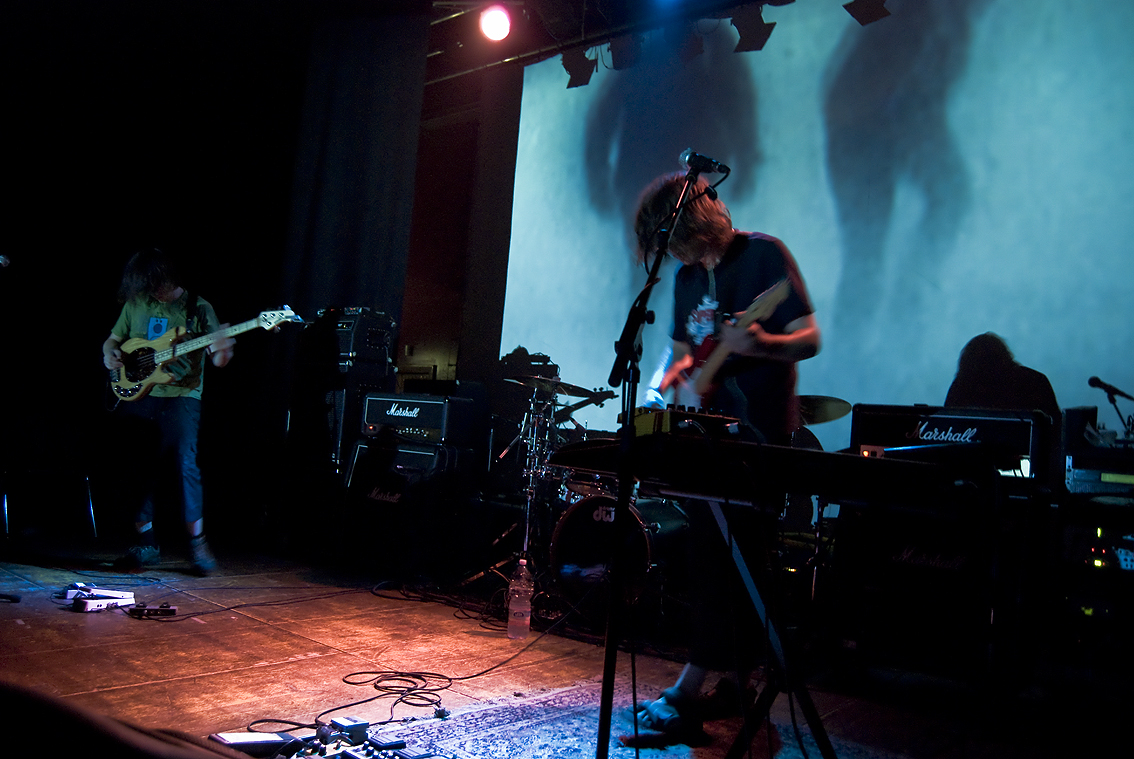
- God Is an Astronaut performing live in 2009
- Studio albums: 12
- Extended plays: 1
- Singles: 11
- Music videos: 3
- Miscellaneous appearances: 2

The discography of God Is an Astronaut, an Irish post-rock band from Wicklow, consists of twelve studio albums, one EP, one live record, and eleven singles.

== Studio albums ==
List of studio albums, with selected chart positions
Title	Album details	Peak chart positions
Title	Album details	IRL
The End of the Beginning	Released: 1 November 2002; Label: Revive (RVE003); Formats: CD, 2xLP	—
All Is Violent, All Is Bright	Released: 4 February 2005; Label: Revive (RVE006), Rocket Girl (RGIRL48); Formats: CD, LP	72
Far from Refuge	Released: 5 April 2007; Label: Revive (RVE008); Formats: CD, LP, DD	—
God Is an Astronaut	Released: 7 November 2008; Label: Revive (RVE009); Formats: CD, 2xLP, DD	—
Age of the Fifth Sun	Released: 17 May 2010; Label: Revive (RVE001); Formats: CD, LP, DD	—
Origins	Released: 16 September 2013; Label: Rocket Girl (RGIRL98); Formats: CD, LP, DD	—
Helios | Erebus	Released: 21 June 2015; Label: Revive (RVE018); Formats: CD, LP, DD	—
Epitaph	Released: 27 April 2018; Label: Napalm Records; Formats: CD, LP, DD, Stream	—
Ghost Tapes #10	Released: 12 February 2021; Label: Napalm Records; Formats: CD, LP, DD, Stream	—
The Beginning of the End	Released: 15 July 2022; Label: Napalm Records; Formats: CD, LP, DD, Stream	—
Somnia	Released: 4 November 2022; Label: Independent; Formats: CD, LP, DD, Stream	—
Embers	Released: 6 September 2024; Label: Napalm Records; Formats: CD, LP, DD, Stream	—
"—" denotes a release that did not chart.

== EPs ==
List of eps, with selected chart positions
Title	Album details	Peak chart positions
Title	Album details	IRL
A Moment of Stillness	Released: 21 August 2006; Label: Revive (RVE007), Rocket Girl (RGIRL47); Formats: CD, 12", CS	30

== Live albums ==
Title	Album details
Live @ Hellfest	Released: 10 July 2026; Label: Revive; Formats: CD, stream

== Singles ==
=== Retail singles ===
List of retail singles
Year	Single	Album
2003	"The End of the Beginning"	The End of the Beginning
2003	"From Dust to the Beyond"	The End of the Beginning
2003	"Point Pleasant"	The End of the Beginning
2004	"Coda"	The End of the Beginning
2004	"Fragile"	All is Violent, All is Bright
2005	"Fireflies and Empty Skies"	All is Violent, All is Bright
2006	"Beyond the Dying Light"	Far from Refuge
2006	"Tempus Horizon"	Far from Refuge
2007	"No Return"	God Is an Astronaut
2009	"Shining Through"	Age of the Fifth Sun
2010	"In the Distance Fading"	Age of the Fifth Sun
2013	"Spiral Code"	Origins
2014	"The Last March"	Origins

=== Split singles ===
List of split singles, with other artists
Year	Single	Other artist
2008	"Helder Pedro Moreira"/"No Return"	The Mantra ATSMM

== Music videos ==
List of music videos, with directors
Year	Title	Director
2003	"The End of the Beginning"	—N/a
2003	"From Dust to the Beyond"	—N/a
2012	"Fragile"	—N/a
2013	"Reverse World"	Kari Salonen
2013	"Spiral Code"	—N/a
2018	"Komorebi"	Derval Freeman
2018	"Epitaph"	—N/a
2020	"Burial"	Chariot of Black Moth
2021	"Fade"	Chariot of Black Moth
2021	"Adrift"	Chariot of Black Moth
2021	"In Flux"	Chariot of Black Moth
2021	"Barren Trees"	Chariot of Black Moth
2021	"Luminous Waves"	Chariot of Black Moth
2022	"Spectres"	Chariot of Black Moth
2022	"From Dust to the Beyond (Live)"	—N/a
2022	"Coda (Live)"	—N/a
2022	"Route 666"	—N/a
2025	"All is Violent, All is Bright"	Aaron Ryan

== Miscellaneous appearances ==
List of miscelleaneous appearances on compilation albums
Year	Song	Album	Notes
2006	"A Moment of Stillness"	Psychadelica, Vol. 1	From A Moment of Stillness.
2011	"Frozen Twilight"	3... 2... 1... A Rocket Girl Compilation	From A Moment of Stillness.
