= Embers (disambiguation) =

Embers is a 1959 radio play by Samuel Beckett.

Embers may also refer to:

- Embers, the plural of ember

== Music ==
- The Embers (Tasmanian band)
- Will Stoker and the Embers
- The Embers (El Paso band), a band headed by Jim Reese
- Embers (Californian band), a heavy metal band
- Embers, an album by Helen Jane Long
- Embers (Nadia Ali album), 2009
- Embers (God Is an Astronaut album), 2024

=== Songs ===
- "Embers", a track by Mike Oldfield from the 1999 album Guitars
- "Embers" (Just Jack song), 2009 song by Just Jack
- "Embers", a 2010 song by Ash
- "Embers", a 2005 song by Blue Foundation
- "Embers", a song by Kid Cudi from Speedin' Bullet 2 Heaven
- "Embers", a 2015 single by Lamb of God from VII: Sturm und Drang
- "Embers", a 2012 song by Owl City from The Midsummer Station
- "Embers" (James Newman song), a 2021 single by James Newman in the Eurovision Song Contest 2021

== Other uses ==
- Embers (1916 film), a 1916 silent film
- Sholay (transl. Embers), a 1975 Indian dacoit Western film by Ramesh Sippy
- Embers (1983 film), a drama film by Thomas Koerfer
- Embers (2015 film), a science fiction film by Claire Carré
- The Embers (nightclub), New York City
- Embers (novel), a 1942 novel by Sándor Márai
- Daniel Embers (born 1981), German football footballer and coach
- "Embers", a nickname for Andrew Embley (born 1981), Australian rules footballer
- Angarey (transl. Embers), a 1932 collection of nine short stories and a one act play in Urdu by several Indian writers

== See also ==
- Ember (disambiguation)
- Ash (disambiguation)
- Ashes (disambiguation)
- Cinder (disambiguation)
- Shola (disambiguation)
- Angarey (disambiguation)
