= ASC =

ASC may refer to:

== Educational institutions ==
- Anglican Schools Commission, Australia
- Andres Soriano Colleges of Bislig, located in Surigao del Sur, Philippines
- Agnes Scott College, Decatur, Georgia
- Alfred State College, Alfred, New York

== Organizations ==
=== Australia ===
- Australian Securities Commission, now the Australian Securities & Investments Commission
- Australian Singing Competition
- Australian Sports Commission
- ASC Pty Ltd (former Australian Submarine Corporation), a naval shipbuilder
- BAE Systems Maritime Australia, formerly ASC Shipbuilding, established by ASC Pty Ltd

=== Canada ===
- Advertising Standards Canada
- Agence spatiale canadienne, the Canadian Space Agency
- Alberta Securities Commission
- Association des Scouts du Canada

=== United Kingdom ===
- Amalgamated Society of Core Makers of Great Britain and Ireland, former trade union
- Army Service Corps, the name of the Royal Army Service Corps between 1870 and 1918
- Association of Speakers Clubs, a group of public speaking clubs

=== United States ===
- Accounting Standards Codification, of Generally Accepted Accounting Principles
- Accredited Standards Committee of the American National Standards Institute
  - ASC X9, standards for the financial services industry
  - ASC X12, standards for business electronic data interchange
- Aeronautical Systems Center, inactivated Air Force product center
- Airflow Sciences Corporation, Livonia, Michigan
- American Shakespeare Center, a theatre company in Staunton, Virginia
- American Signal Corporation, a warning siren company founded in 1942
- American Society for Cybernetics
- American Society of Cinematographers, members use postnominal letters ASC
- American Society of Criminology
- American Society of Cytopathology
- American Southwest Conference, an athletic conference
- American Specialty Cars, former automobile parts manufacturer
- United States Army Sustainment Command

=== International ===
- Post-nominal letters of Adorers of the Blood of Christ
- Aquaculture Stewardship Council
- Asian Socialist Conference

=== Elsewhere ===
- Indian Army Service Corps, India
- Afrika-Studiecentrum Leiden (African Studies Centre), Netherlands
- Army Service Corps, a unit of the Pakistan Army
- Aviation Safety Council (now the Taiwan Transportation Safety Board), Taiwan
- Assets Scrutiny Committee, former government agency

== Science and technology ==
- Abstract simplicial complex
- Apoptosis-associated speck-like protein containing a CARD, a protein encoded by the PYCARD gene
- Application Session Controller, an element of a telecommunications network
- Arnhem Space Centre, a spaceport in northern Australia
- Autism spectrum condition, a form of neurodivergence

=== Automotive ===
- Active Stability Control, Mitsubishi Electronic Stability Control system
- Automatic Stability Control, BMW traction control system, used in motorcycles such as BMW R1200RT

=== Computing ===
- Additional Sense Code, extension to a Key Code Qualifier error-code returned by a SCSI device
- .asc, computer filename extension used for some ASCII text files, and Server-Side ActionScript
- Asynchronous serial communication
- Asynchronous serial controller, alternate name for universal asynchronous receiver/transmitter
- Australia Singapore Cable, submarine telecommunications cable
- TI Advanced Scientific Computer, 1966 supercomputer architecture

== Other uses ==
- Aberdeen Science Centre, a science museum in Scotland
- Admiralty Sailing Craft, a UK sailing dinghy
- After School Club, South Korean TV show
- Al Ahly SC, a sports club based in Cairo, Egypt
- Altered state of consciousness
- Altered States of Consciousness Rating Scale
- Ambulatory surgery center, a type of healthcare facility
- American Solar Challenge, solar car race
- American Song Contest, an American music competition
- Ashchurch for Tewkesbury railway station (UK National Rail code)
- Asian Science Camp
- ASC (musician), a musician producing electronic music

== See also ==
- ASK (disambiguation)
