= Asche =

Asche may refer to:

- Asche (surname)
- Asché, a code name of Hans-Thilo Schmidt (1888–1943), German cryptographer who sold information about the Enigma coding machine to the French

== See also ==
- Asch (disambiguation)
- Ash (disambiguation)
- Ashe (disambiguation)
- Ashes (disambiguation)
