= Ash (disambiguation) =

Ash is the solid remains of fire.

Ash may also refer to:

== Trees and shrubs ==
- Fraxinus, the ash trees, a genus of flowering plants in the olive and lilac family
- Several species but not all in the genus Flindersia
- Mountain ash, a name used for several trees, none of immediate relation
- Zanthoxylum (Prickly ash), genus of about 250 species of deciduous and evergreen trees and shrubs in the citrus or rue family, Rutaceae

== Language ==
- Æ (or ash), an Old English letter
- Tequiraca language, spoken in Peru (ISO 693-3: ash)

== Literature ==
- Ash (novel), a 2009 LGBTQ young adult novel by Malinda Lo
- Ash, novel by James Herbert
- Ash: A Secret History, a 2000 fantasy novel by Mary Gentle
- Ash (comics), a comic series about a superhero firefighter

== Music ==
- Ash (band), a rock band from Northern Ireland
- Ash (ballet), by Peter Martins (1991)
- Ash (album), a 2017 album by French-Cuban R&B duo Ibeyi, also a track on the album
- "Ash", a 2008 Italo disco song by Tiziana Rivale

== People ==
- Ash (name), a list of people and fictional characters so named
- Ash (artist) (born 1968), French graffiti artist
- Oisc of Kent (or Æsc; died 512), semi-legendary King of Kent

== Places ==
=== Canada ===
- Ash Mountain (British Columbia)

=== England ===
- Ash, now generally known as Salway Ash, in the parish of Netherbury, Dorset
- Ash railway station, Surrey
- Ash (near Stourpaine), Dorset
- Ash, Braunton, a historic estate listed in the Domesday Book
- Ash, Derbyshire
- Ash, Devon
- Ash, Dover, Kent
- Ash, Musbury, a historic estate
- Ash Priors, Somerset
- Ash, Oxfordshire
- Ash, Sevenoaks, Kent
- Ash, South Somerset
- Ash (near Taunton), Somerset
- Ash, Surrey
- Ash Vale, a village in Ash parish, Surrey

=== United States ===
- Ash, Missouri, an unincorporated community in Monroe County
- Ash, North Carolina, Brunswick County
- Ash, Oregon, Douglas County
- Ash, Texas, an unincorporated community
- Ash, West Virginia, an unincorporated community
- Ash Mountain (Montana)
- Ash Township, Michigan, in Monroe County
- Ash Township, Barry County, Missouri

== Science and technology ==
- Ash (analytical chemistry)
- AA-5 Ash, NATO name for the Soviet Bisnovat R-4 missile
- Almquist shell, a command-line interface for computers
- a.s.h, Usenet newsgroup alt.suicide.holiday

== Other uses ==
- Āsh, a Persian dish
- Ash (deity), the ancient Egyptian god of oases
- Ash (2019 film), a drama about forest fires
- Ash (2025 film), a science fiction film

== See also ==
- ASH (disambiguation)
- ASHS (disambiguation)
- Asch (disambiguation)
- Asche (disambiguation)
- Ashe (disambiguation)
- Ashes (disambiguation)
- Ash Wednesday, Christian religious holiday
- Ash Thursday, Icelandic volcanic events in 2010
- Ember (disambiguation)
- Embers (disambiguation)
- Cinder (disambiguation)
