= Asch =

Asch may refer to:

== People ==
- Asch (surname)
- Asch., taxonomic author abbreviation of Paul Friedrich August Ascherson (1834–1913), German botanist

== Places ==
- the German name for the town of Aš in the Czech Republic
- Asch (Netherlands), a village

== Other uses ==
- Asch the Bloody, a character in Tales of the Abyss
- American Society of Church History
- American Society of Clinical Hypnosis
- Äsch or Aesch, another name for the European grayling (Thymallus vulgaris)

== See also ==
- Asche (disambiguation)
- Asch conformity experiments
- Van Asch Deaf Education Centre
- Asc (disambiguation)
- Ash (disambiguation)
- Ashe (disambiguation)
