= Ember (surname) =

Ember is a surname. Notable people with the surname include:

- Carol R. Ember (born 1943), American cultural anthropologist, cross-cultural researcher, writer, and organization executive; wife of Melvin
- József Ember (1908–1982) Hungarian football coach
- Melvin Ember (1933–2009), American cultural anthropologist, cross-cultural researcher, writer, and editor; husband of Carol
- Zoltán Ember (1962–2015), Hungarian serial killer

== See also ==
- Ember (disambiguation)
- Ember (given name)
