= Ashes =

Ashes may refer to:

- Ash, the solid remnants of fires.

== Media and entertainment ==
=== Art ===
- Ashes (Munch), an 1894 painting by Edvard Munch

=== Film ===
- The Ashes (film), a 1965 Polish film by director Andrzej Wajda
- Ashes (1922 film), an American silent film
- Ashes, a 2010 film by director Ajay Naidu
- Ashes (2012 film), a British thriller
- Ashes (1916), American short silent film directed by Robert F. Hill and John McDermott

=== Literature ===
- Ashes (Polish: Popioły), a 1904 novel by Polish writer Stefan Żeromski
- Ashes (Italian: Cenere), a 1904 novel by Italian writer Grazia Deledda
- Ashes (Japanese: 煤煙, romanized: Bō no Kanashimi), a 2003 novel by Japanese writer Kenzo Kitakata
- Ashes: Poems New & Old, a 1979 book by Philip Levine
- "Ashes", a 1924 short story by C. M. Eddy Jr.
- Ashes, book 1 of the ASHES trilogy by Ilsa J. Bick
- Ashes, a thirty-five volume series of novels by William W. Johnstone

=== Theatre ===
- Ashes (play), a play by David Rudkin

=== Television ===
- A series of television competitions in the Gladiators franchise between Australia and the UK:

=== Music ===
==== Albums ====
- Ashes (Illenium album), 2016
- Ashes (Kyla La Grange album), 2012
- Ashes (Tristania album), 2005
- Ashes (EP), by Mia Fieldes, or the title song, 2015
- Ashes, by Christian Death, 1985
- Ashes, by the Prophecy, 2003
- Ashes, by Two Steps From Hell, 2008

==== Songs ====
- "Ashes" (Celine Dion song), 2018
- "Ashes" (Embrace song), 2004
- "Ashes", by Black Tide from Post Mortem, 2011
- "Ashes", by Chelsea Grin from Ashes to Ashes, 2014
- "Ashes", by Crazy Town from The Brimstone Sluggers, 2015
- "Ashes", by Dawn of Solace from Waves, 2020
- "Ashes", by Five Finger Death Punch from The Way of the Fist, 2007
- "Ashes", by Ghost from Prequelle, 2018
- "Ashes", by Grand Magus from Wolf's Return, 2005
- "Ashes", by In This Moment from Beautiful Tragedy, 2007
- "Ashes", by Kid Cudi from Free, 2025
- "Ashes", by KT Tunstall from KT Tunstall's Acoustic Extravaganza, 2006
- "Ashes", by Meghan Trainor from Treat Myself, 2020
- "Ashes", by Pain of Salvation from The Perfect Element, Part I, 2000
- "Ashes", by Screamin' Jay Hawkins, 1962
- "Ashes", by Seven Spires from Solveig, 2017
- "Ashes", by Stellar, 2020
- "Ashes", by Threshold from March of Progress, 2012
- "Ashes", by Trivium from Ember to Inferno, 2003
- "Ashes", by Wolfheart from Wolves of Karelia, 2020

== Sport ==
- Cricket:
  - The Ashes, the men's Test cricket series between England and Australia
  - The Women's Ashes, the women's cricket series between England and Australia
- Rugby league:
  - Men's rugby league Ashes, the rugby league Test series between Australia and Great Britain/England
  - Women's rugby league Ashes, the women's rugby league Test series between Australia and England
  - Wheelchair rugby league Ashes, the wheelchair rugby league Test series between Australia and England
- Soccer/Association football:
  - Soccer Ashes, soccer series held between Australia and New Zealand between the 1920s and 1950s

== See also ==
- Ash (disambiguation)
- Ashe (disambiguation)
- ASH (disambiguation)
- ASHS (disambiguation)
- Four Ashes (disambiguation)
- Ashes to Ashes (disambiguation)
- Ashes, Ashes (1943 novel) science fiction novel by René Barjavel
- Ashes Ashes, 2002 album by Leiahdorus
- Ember (disambiguation)
- Embers (disambiguation)
- Cinder (disambiguation)
