= Sea of Trees (disambiguation) =

Sea of Trees most commonly refers to Aokigahara, a forest in Japan.

Sea of Trees may also refer to:

- "Sea of Trees", a song by King Gizzard & the Lizard Wizard
- "Sea of Trees", a song by God Is an Astronaut from the 2015 album Helios / Erebus
- The Sea of Trees, a 2015 film
