= Four Ashes =

Four Ashes may refer to:

- Four Ashes, Buckinghamshire, England
- Four Ashes, Staffordshire, England
- Four Ashes railway station in Staffordshire, England

== See also ==
- Ashes (disambiguation)
- Ash (disambiguation)
