= Halo of Flies (disambiguation) =

Halo of Flies was an American rock band. The phrase may also refer to:

- "Halo of Flies", the 1971 song by Alice Cooper for which the band was named
- "Halo of Flies", a song by God Is an Astronaut on the 2005 album All Is Violent, All Is Bright
