= Ash Mountain =

Ash Mountain may refer to:

- Ash Mountain (British Columbia), Canada
- Ash Mountain, California, the administrative district of Sequoia National Park, United States
  - Ash Mountain Entrance Sign, a National Register of Historic Places-listed sign at the entrance to Sequoia National Park
- Ash Mountain (Montana), United States
