= Cinder =

Cinder or Cinders may refer to:

== In general ==
- Ember, also called cinder
- Ash, also called cinder
- Scoria, or cinder, a type of volcanic rock

== Computing ==
- Cinder (programming library), a C++ programming library for visualization
- Cinder, OpenStack's block storage component
- Cyber Insider Threat, CINDER, a digital threat method

== Film ==
- Cinders (1913 film), a 1913 silent film
- Cinders (1920 film), a 1920 film starring Hoot Gibson
- Cinders (1926 film), a 1926 British film starring Betty Balfour

== Literature ==
- Cinder (novel), a novel by Marissa Meyer
- Cinders (visual novel), a 2012 visual novel adaptation of Cinderella by MoaCube
- Linh Cinder, the character from the novel and The Lunar Chronicles series
- Cinder Fall, a major antagonist in the animated web series RWBY
- Cinder, a character in the Killer Instinct video games

== Music ==
- Cinder (album), by the Dirty Three
- Cinders (musical), musical with music by Rudolf Friml and both book and lyrics by Edward Clark.
- Cinder (musician) (born 1961), stage name of Scottish musician Cindy Sharp

== Other uses ==
- Cinder (bear), a bear rescued with burns after 2014 wildfires in Washington, United States
- Cinder toffee, a British name for honeycomb toffee

== See also ==
- Cinder cone, a type of volcano
- Cinderblock
- Cinder track
- Cinderella (disambiguation)
- Cynder (disambiguation)
- Ash (disambiguation)
- Ashes (disambiguation)
- Ember (disambiguation)
- Embers (disambiguation)
