= Shola (disambiguation) =

A shola is a patch of tropical montane forest in South India.

Shola may also refer to:

- Shola (name), including a list of people and fictional characters with the name
- Shola (album), by Awaz, 1996
- Sholapith, or shola, a dried spongey plant matter
- Shola Shopping Center in Riyadh, Saudi Arabia

== See also ==
- Shola Aur Shabnam (disambiguation)
- Shola-e Javid, a defunct Maoist political party founded around 1964 in Afghanistan
- Sholay, a 1975 Indian dacoit Western film by Ramesh Sippy
  - Sholay: The Making of a Classic, a 2000 book by Anupama Chopra about the making of the classic film
  - Aag (2007 film), a remake by Ram Gopal Varma
