= Oisín (disambiguation) =

Oisín is a legendary poet and demigod from Irish mythology. The name or its variant Oisin may also refer to:

- Oisin (given name)
- Oisín, an Irish short documentary film
- "Oisín", a song by God Is an Astronaut from the album Epitaph
