= Halocyan Records =

- Founded: 2010
- Founder: Dimitri Fergadis
- Genre: Techno, acid house, Chicago house
- Country of origin: U.S.
- Location: Los Angeles, California
- Official website: www.halocyan.com

Halocyan Records is an American independent record label founded in 2010 by Dimitri Fergadis, the founder of experimental techno label Phthalo Records. Based in Los Angeles, California, the label has released music by DJ Pierre of Chicago-based acid house group Phuture, Paul Woolford, techno pioneer Joey Beltram, Vladislav Delay (as Sistol), ASC, xxxy, Appleblim & Al Tourettes, Extrawelt.

Halocyan promotes and releases music influenced by classic techno and house. Fergadis defines the label's goal as returning to techno's founding principle of "focusing on technology as an aesthetic question rather than as a background assumption for music."

Releases from the label have been met with critical acclaim, with Resident Advisor praising Sistol’s early Halocyan release for continuing to "pay out new and surprising dividends with each successive listen". Ibiza Voice praised the label for being "one of the most freethinking and consistent techno labels on the US West Coast".

In 2012 Halocyan took part in a Boiler Room label showcase, enlisting Chrissy Murderbot, John Tejada, DJ Pierre, Dntel, Exillon and Sumsun to perform.

In October 2014 the label released Universal Quantifier, a double-CD label compilation of original tracks and remixes. It was critically acclaimed by a number of titles, including self-titled "A body of work that distinguishes Halocyan as a truly remarkable purveyor of forward dance styles", DJ Mag "A tasty portfolio", Impose Magazine "A shining example of the trance-inducing, future-leaning club the label’s been steadily curating" and Textura "A collective snapshot of experimental club music in its current form".

== Artists ==
- Aki Latvamäki
- Arkist
- ASC
- Chrissy Murderbot
- Dosem
- Gravious
- Jason Potratz
- Paul Woolford
- Raudive
- Stabber
- Sumsun
- Vladislav Delay As Sistol
- Xxxy

== Remixers ==
- [a]pendics.shuffle
- Aki Latvamäki
- Al Tourettes & Appleblim
- Alva Noto
- Atsushi Shimomura
- Chrissy Murderbot
- DJ Pierre
- DMX Krew
- DuranDuranDuran
- Extrawelt
- FaltyDL
- French Fries
- Hackman
- Girl Unit
- Ike Yard
- Isotonik
- Joey Beltram
- John Tejada
- Jori Hulkkonen
- Kangding Ray
- Komonazmuk
- Legowelt
- Matthias Zimmermann
- Max Cooper
- Mike Huckaby
- Mike Slott
- Minilogue
- NHK RMX
- Octo Octa
- October
- Oneohtrix Point Never
- Randomer
- Raudive
- Redshape
- Scuba
- Somatic Responses
- Steve Moore
- Sumsun
- Sutekh
- Walls

== Discography ==
Year	Release	Cat. no
2014	V/A - Universal Quantifier	PHC020
2013	Dosem - Atica RMXS	PHC019
2013	Gravious - Rolling Thunder	PHC018
2013	Jason Potratz - Absent Center	PHC017
2013	Dosem - Atica	PHC016
2013	Raudive - Last EP	PHC015
2013	ASC - Sonic Assault EP	PHC014
2013	Arkist - Never Forgotten EP	PHC013
2013	Stabber - HUH! EP	PHC012
2013	Sumsun - Avey Oliver EP	PHC011
2012	Paul Woolford - Pursuit (Extrawelt Remixes)	PHC010
2012	Aki Latvamäki - It Is Not Now Either EP	PHC009
2012	Paul Woolford - Pursuit EP	PHC008
2012	Chrissy Murderbot - Friendship EP	PHC007
2012	xxxy - Bash EP	PHC006
2010	Vladislav Delay as Sistol - On The Brighter Side (Remixes Vol. 2)	PHC05
2010	Vladislav Delay as Sistol - On The Bright Side	PHC04
2010	Vladislav Delay as Sistol - On The Brighter Side (Remixes Vol. 1)	PHC03
2010	Vladislav Delay as Sistol - Remasters & Remakes	PHC02
2010	Vladislav Delay as Sistol - Sistol (Remakes) EP	PHC01
