= ASH =

ASH may refer to:

== Medicine and health ==
- Action on Smoking and Health, campaign groups on tobacco risks
- American Society of Hematology
- Asymmetric septal hypertrophy, a heart condition
- Atascadero State Hospital, California, United States
- Austin State Hospital, Texas, United States

== Military ==
- Argyll and Sutherland Highlanders, a British Army unit
- Autonomous Shipboard Humanoid, a US Navy robotics project

== Transport ==
- Ashburton railway station, Melbourne, Australia
- Mesa Airlines, Arizona, United States (ICAO: ASH)
- Nashua Municipal Airport, New Hampshire, United States (IATA: ASH)

== Other uses ==
- Actor's School Hiroshima, a performing arts school in Japan
- American School of The Hague, a school in the Netherlands
- American Shorthair, a breed of domestic cat
- ASH: Archaic Sealed Heat, a 2007 Nintendo game
- alt.suicide.holiday, Usenet newsgroup

== See also ==
- Ash (disambiguation)
- Ashes (disambiguation)
- ASHS (disambiguation)
