= Novocaine (disambiguation) =

Novocaine is the commercial name for procaine, a local anesthetic.

Novocaine may also refer to:

== Music ==
- Novacaine (band), an American rock music group
- The Novocaines, an Australian musical group
- "Novacane" (song), a 2011 song by Frank Ocean
- "Novacaine" (song), a 2017 song by 10 Years
- "Novocaine", a song by Alice Cooper on the 2003 album The Eyes of Alice Cooper
- "Novocaine", a song by Bon Jovi on the 2005 album Have a Nice Day
- "Novocaine" a song by Switchblade Symphony's from the 2005 reissue of Serpentine Gallery
- "Novocaine", a song by Lo-Pro from the 2010 album The Beautiful Sounds of Revenge
- "Novocaine", a song by Fall Out Boy on the 2015 album American Beauty/American Psycho
- "Novocaine", a 2019 single by The Unlikely Candidates
- "Novocaine", a song by Maggie Lindemann on the 2022 album Suckerpunch
- "Novocaine", a song by Stellar on the 2024 album Dangerous Game
- "Novacane", a song by Beck on the 1996 album Odelay

== Film ==
- Novocaine (2001 film), a film by David Atkins
- Novocaine (2025 film), an American action thriller film

== See also ==
- "Novocaine for the Soul", a 1996 song by Eels
- "Give Me Novacaine", a song by Green Day on the 2004 album American Idiot
