= Calistoga =

Calistoga may refer to:

- Calistoga, California
- Calistoga AVA, an American Viticultural Area that partly overlaps the town of Calistoga
- Calistoga Water Company, bottled water brand sourced in Calistoga, California
- Calistoga, code name for Intel's 945 chipset designed for use in mobile devices
- Calistoga, a Post-hardcore band from Brazil
- "Calistoga", a song by God Is an Astronaut from the album Origins
