= Ashe =

Ashe may refer to:

== Places ==
- Ashe, Hampshire, England, a village
- Ashe County, North Carolina, United States

== People ==
- Ashe (name), including a list of people with the surname
- Ashe (singer), American singer-songwriter Ashlyn Rae Willson (born 1993)

== Fictional characters ==
- Ashe (Overwatch), in the 2016 video game Overwatch
- "Ashe, The Frost Archer", a champion in the online game League of Legends
- Ashe, a playable character in the 2007 video game Mega Man ZX Advent
- Ashe, in the video game Final Fantasy XII
- Ashe, in the fantasy-romance novels The Symphony of Ages by Elizabeth Haydon
- Ashe Foreth rem ir Osboth (also spelled Osborth), in the novel The Left Hand of Darkness
- Ashe Ubert, in the video games Fire Emblem: Three Houses and Fire Emblem Warriors: Three Hopes

== Other uses ==
- Aṣẹ, or ashe, a Yoruba philosophical and religious concept
- Àshe, the unofficial motto and intramural competition war cry of Timothy Dwight College at Yale University, based on the Yoruba translation of "the power to make things happen"
- American Society of Hispanic Economists
- Ashe baronets, an extinct title in the Baronetage of England
- Ashe Cottage, Demopolis, Alabama, a house on the National Register of Historic Places
- ISO 639-3 code for the Koro Wachi language of Nigeria

== See also ==
- Ash (disambiguation)
- Ashes (disambiguation)
- Asche (disambiguation)
- Asch (disambiguation)
