= ASHS =

ASHS may refer to:

- Albany Senior High School (disambiguation)
- Alexandria Senior High School, Alexandria, Louisiana, United States
- All Saints High School (disambiguation)
- Abington Senior High School, Abington, Pennsylvania, United States
- Armadale Senior High School, Armadale, Western Australia, Australia
- Atherton State High School, Atherton, Queensland, Australia
- American Society for Horticultural Science, Alexandria, Virginia, United States

== See also ==
- ASH (disambiguation)
- Ash (disambiguation)
- Ashes (disambiguation)
