= Cynder =

Cynder may refer to:

- Cynder, a band in Battle for Ozzfest
- Cynder, a main character in The Legend of Spyro and Skylanders video game franchises

== See also ==
- Cinder (disambiguation)
