= Vaccine (musician) =

American record producer (1979–2023)

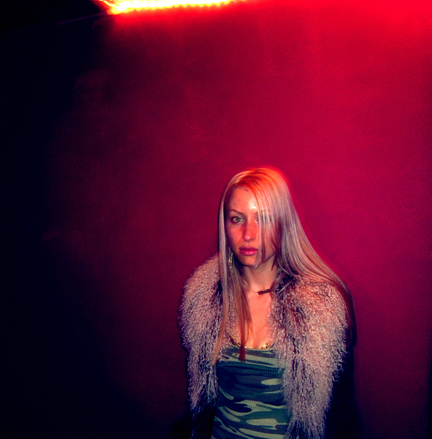
- Vaccine in 2007

Background information
- Also known as: Vaccine
- Born: Christine Clements; December 26, 1979
- Origin: Del Mar, California, U.S.
- Died: August 22, 2023 (aged 43)
- Genres: Dubstep, ambient, IDM
- Occupations: Electronic musician, producer, programmer
- Instruments: Vocals, keyboards, piano,
- Years active: 2007–2023
- Labels: Hotflush Recordings, Vaccine Recordings

Christine Clements (December 26, 1979 – August 22, 2023), known professionally as Vaccine, was an American dubstep record producer based in California. She was one of the first women signed to a dubstep related record label (Hotflush Recordings), which was up until then a genre whose producers were almost entirely male.

Before she started producing, Clements promoted other people's music.

Vaccine's style has been recognised as being considerably more melodic and ethereal, with XLR8R magazine noting her "subtle melodies and echoed vocals", as well as stating that "(Vaccine's) constructions aren't necessarily main floor rave fodder, but rather, comedown music for a 6 a.m. all-back-to-mine", as well as mentioning "jittery electronic elements with gothic ambient nuances."

Clements was a self-described Skinny Puppy and Portishead fan. Her influences were "Nine Inch Nails, Dom & Roland, Skinny Puppy, The Prodigy, Technical Itch, Sasha and Digweed, Future Sound of London, Akira Yamaoka, Helios, Harold Budd, Surgeon, Zero 7, Portishead, Massive Attack, Tricky, friends, lovers, label mates, colors, sounds, places, feelings."

In 2014, she released the Decryption EP on ASC's label, Auxiliary Transmissions.

Clements died on August 22, 2023, at the age of 43.

== Discography ==
- "Wishful Thinking" / "Signal to Noise" 12" (Hotflush Recordings / Scuba 006, 2007)
- "Anaesthetic" / "Destroy" 12" (Hotflush Recordings HFO15ii, 2007)
- "Breathless" / "Side Effects" 12" (Hotflush Recordings HFO 17, 2007)
- "Fever" / "Wishful Thinking VIP" CD (Hotflush Recordings HFCD001, 2007)
- "Fever" (high grade mix) / "Concussion" 12" (Vaccine Recordings 002, 2008)
- "Skadi (Vaccine Dubstep Remix)" (Subtle Audio, 2009)
- "Sweet Spot" / "Radiate" 12" (Offshore Recordings OSR022, 2009)
- "Ochre" / "Cascade Failure" 12" (Nonplus Records NONPLUS 007, 2010)
- "68 (Vaccine Remix)" File (Car Crash Set C/C/S2018, 2011)
- "The Axiom (Vaccine Remix)" 12" (The Agriculture AG053, 2011)
- "Machines" 12" (Samurai Red Seal REDSEAL006, 2011)
- "Irradiate" 12" (Veil VEILUN001, 2013)
