= Ember (disambiguation) =

An ember is a glowing hot coal from carbon-based material.

Ember may also refer to:

== Fictional characters ==
- Ember Evergreen, a fictional character from the web series Project Mc²
- Ember Flicker Flame, a fictional character from the toy line Lalaloopsy
- Ember Lumen, a fictional character from the animated Pixar film Elemental
- Ember McLain, a fictional character from the animated series Danny Phantom
- Dragon Lord Ember, a fictional character from the animated series My Little Pony: Friendship is Magic
- Ember, a fictional playable character in the platform fighter game Brawlhalla
- Ember, name of several characters in Marvel Comics
- Ember, a fictional dragon from DC Comics
- Ember, a fictional playable character in the isometric role-playing game Pathfinder: Wrath of the Righteous
- Ember, the post-film nickname given to the Tyrannosaurus rex from Jurassic World Rebirth

== Locations ==
- Ember Ridge, a mountain ridge in British Columbia, Canada
- The Embers (nightclub), a 1950s- and 1960s-era restaurant and nightclub

== Literature ==
- Embers (novel), a 1942 novel by the Hungarian writer Sándor Márai
- The City of Ember, a book series by Jeanne DuPrau

== Music ==
- Embers (band), an American heavy metal band
- The Embers (band), an Australian roots-fusion band
- Will Stoker and the Embers, an Australian post-punk band
- Ember (album), by Breaking Benjamin, 2018
- The Embers, a group fronted by American musician Jim Reese

== Organizations ==
- Ember (coach operator), a Scottish electric intercity bus company
- Ember (non-profit organisation), an environmental organisation
- Ember (technology company), a wireless networking chip company
- Winnipeg Ember FC, a women's soccer team in Canada

== People ==
- Ember (given name)
- Ember (surname)
- Ember (model), American model

== Other ==
- Ember (film), a 2016 Turkish film
- The Embers (film), a 2024 Taiwanese crime drama
- Ember (video game), a 2016 role-playing video game
- Ember days, fasting days within Western Christian churches
- Ember.js, an open-source JavaScript framework

== See also ==
- Embers (disambiguation)
