= Ember (model) =

American model

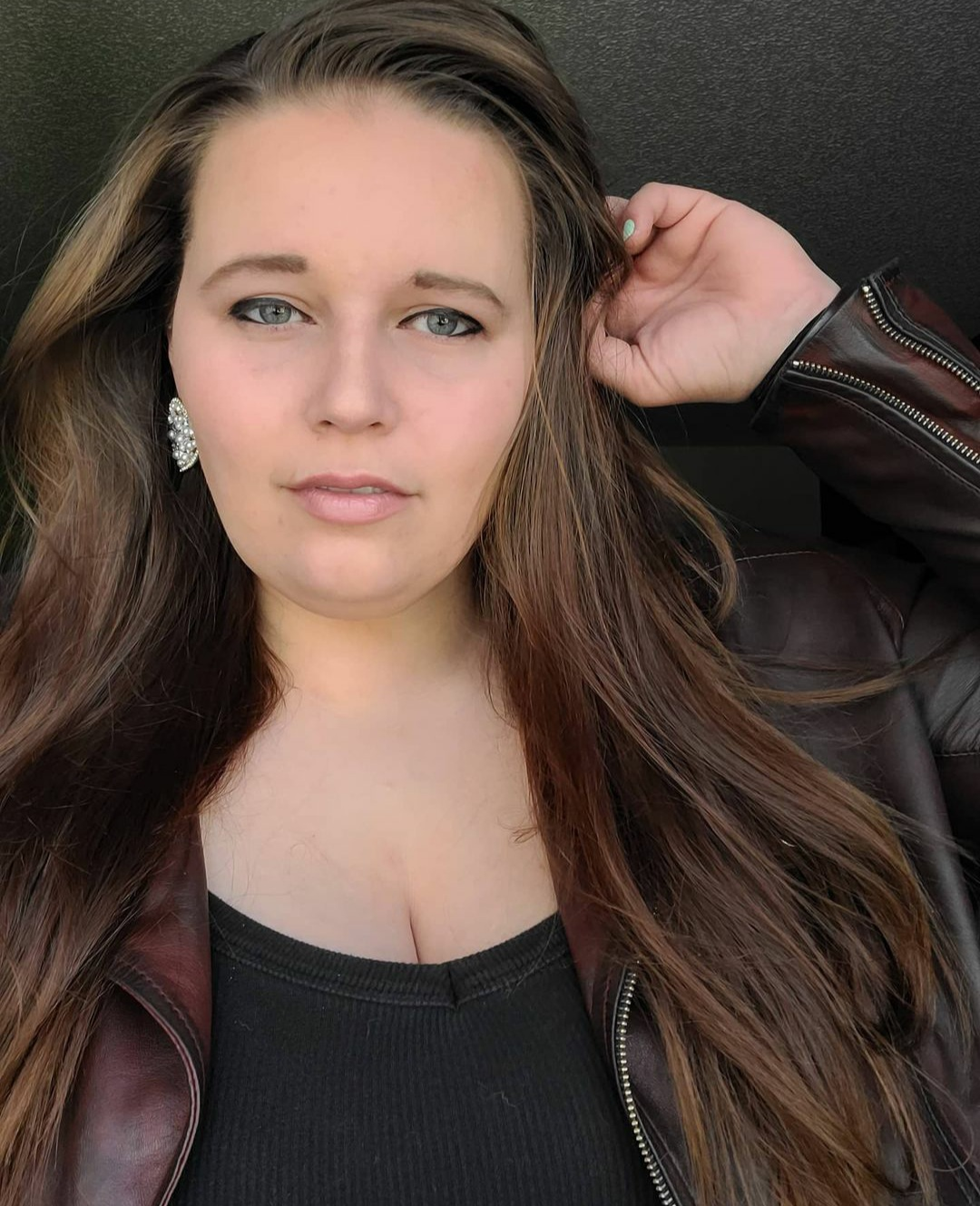
- Born: April 23, 1992 (age 33); Buffalo, Minnesota, U.S.
- Occupation: Model
- Years active: Nov 2018 – present
- Height: 5 ft 11 in (1.80 m)
- Awards: Miss Congeniality, 2020 (Miss Minnesota USA); Miss Voluptuous Minnesota, 2021
- Website: ember.love

Amber Elizabeth Davis (born April 23, 1992), known professionally as Ember, is an American model. She is best known for being a body-positive model, winning Miss Congeniality in the 2020 Miss Minnesota USA pageant, and winning Miss Voluptuous Minnesota 2021.

== Early life and education ==
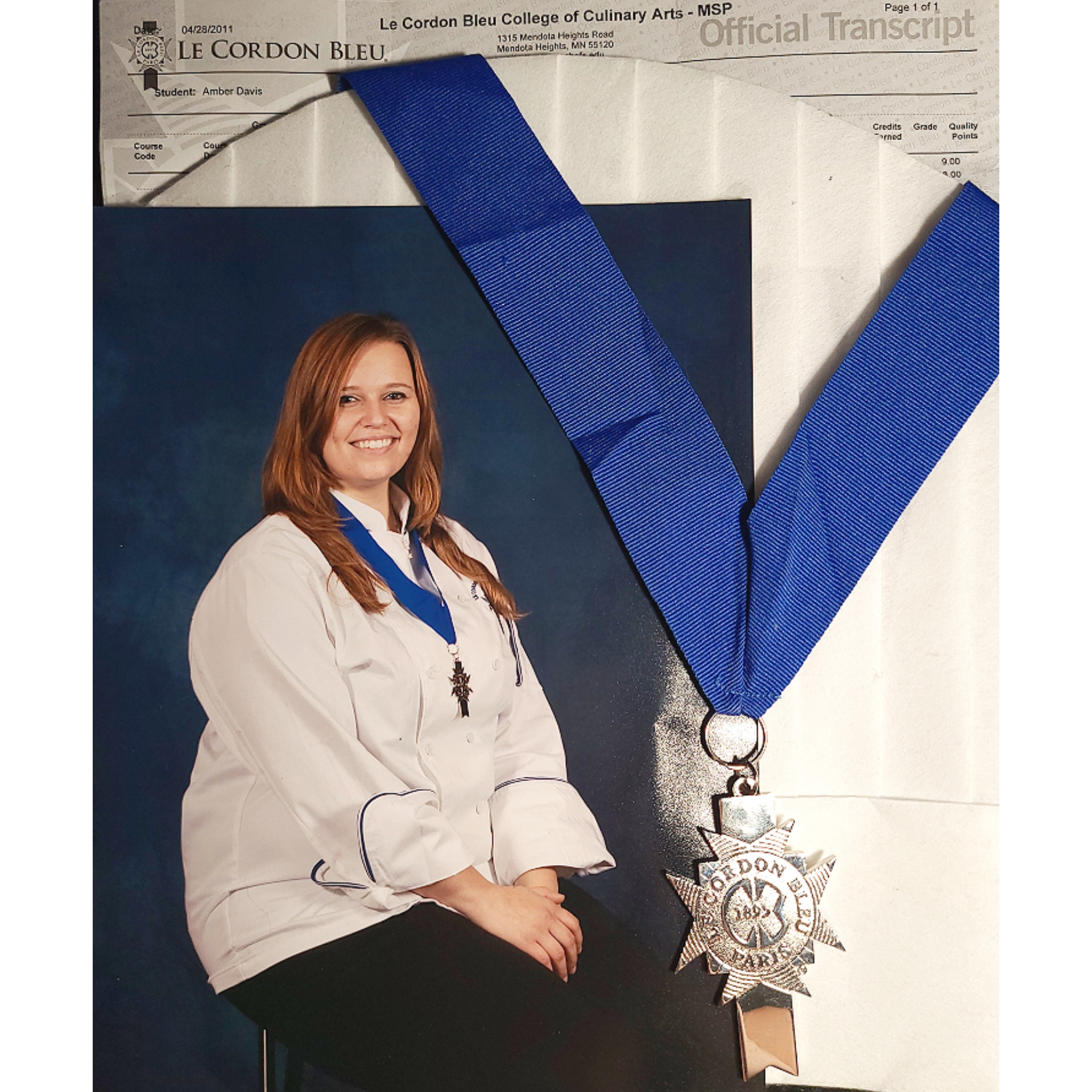
Le Cordon Bleu graduating photo and accoutrement

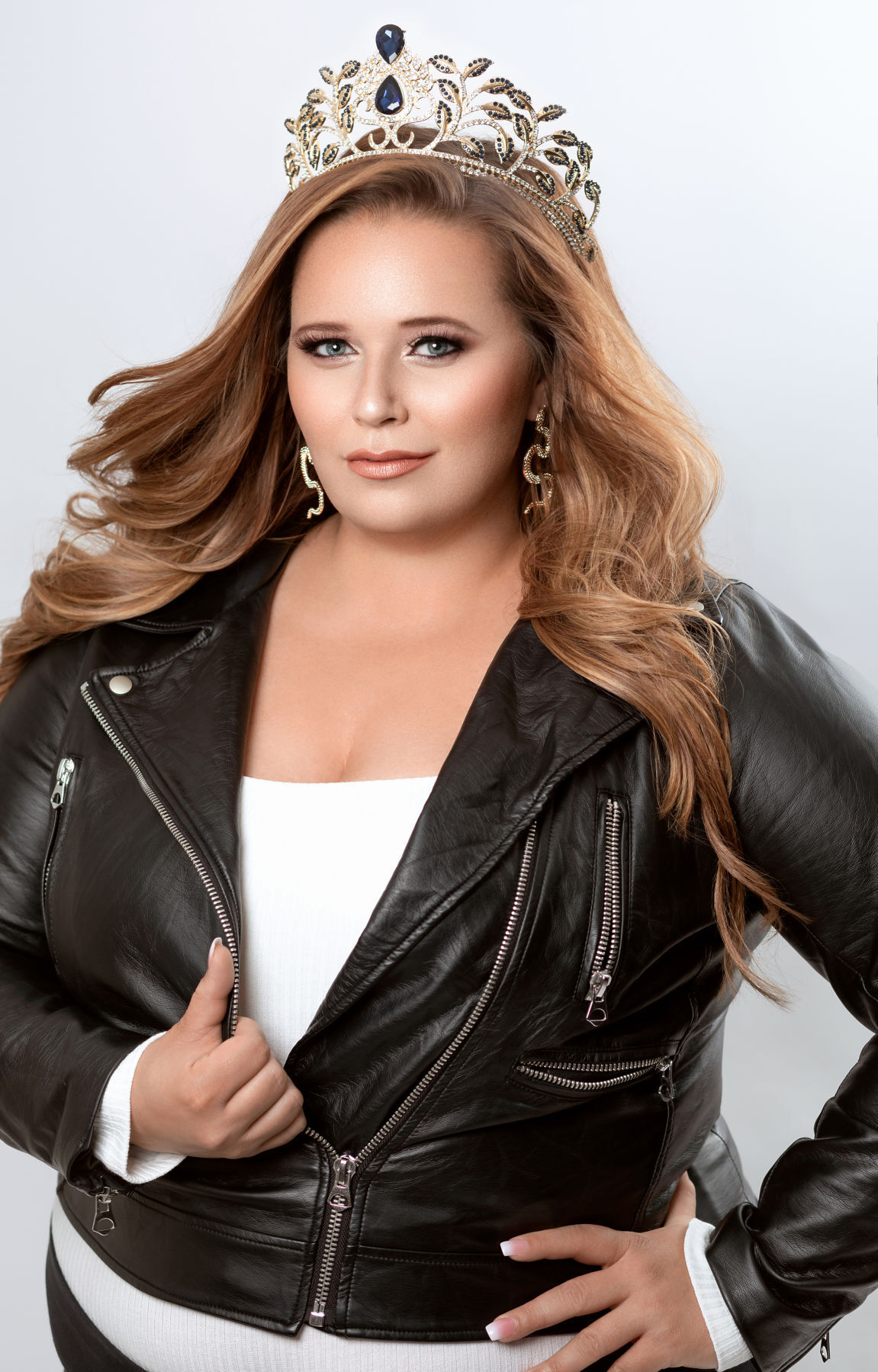
Ember as Miss Voluptuous Minnesota 2021-2022

Amber Elizabeth Davis was born in Buffalo, Minnesota, on April 23, 1992, to mother Karen Gutknecht (now Karen Davis) and father Doyle Davis. She has four siblings including two younger brothers, an older sister, and one older brother, who all grew up on a farm between Howard Lake and Maple Lake.

Ember attended Maple Lake Elementary and High School where, as a sophomore, she competed in the Miss Teen Minnesota USA pageant and, as a junior, she was the only student selected to participate in Girls State for the Boys & Girls County/State program. In her senior year, she was nominated and competed for Miss Maple Lake 2010. From there she went to MN School of Bartending and graduated in 2011 from Le Cordon Bleu College of Culinary Arts.

== Career ==
After graduating college at Le Cordon Bleu of Culinary Arts, Ember accepted an internship in Lutsen, Minnesota, at the Lutsen Mountains ski resort working as a line cook and head chef for two years before returning home as a bartender, using her experience gained from attending the Minnesota School of Bartending. Ember began working for the company of Landscape Structures Inc in 2014 and still works there today as a Production Supervisor in a concrete and manufacturing shop focusing on a variety of welding, grinding, cutting, and plasma torch use. While working at Landscape Structures, she began pursuing modeling and acting opportunities such as being represented in the November 2018 Launch Showcase. Ember was offered a scholarship to return the following year of 2019 to be in another Launch Showcase of Chicago, Illinois.

At the age of 26, she attended the John Casablancas Center for modeling and acting in Minneapolis, Minnesota, graduating February 18, 2019.

In June 2019, Ember won a contest held by For All Bodies, featured by PLUS Model Magazine. The contest awarded her the title FACE of F.A.B. and spokesperson of the New York For All Bodies Runway Show later that year in September. Additionally, she received a Times Square photo shoot in Catherines Plus apparel with F.A.B. founder, Crystal Renee. Later in 2019, Ember landed the role of Cassie in the web-series "TAKE CARE" hosted on YouTube by Bonnie Slight. She appeared in five of the eight episodes from September 2019 through February 2020. Also in 2019, Ember signed onto the web-series "Cocktail Cooking" with the We Cook TV Food Network, directing and hosting her own cooking show.

In 2020 Ember participated in the Miss Minnesota USA pageant, winning Miss Congeniality. Throughout 2019 and 2020 she acted in several student films and art productions, like the lead role Arty in "Arty and the Heist" by EJ Carlson. Another student film would include her as a role in the production of "Floor Plan" that won an award for "Best Use of Character" in the 48 Hour Film Project of MN.

BOLD Magazine, a publication that focuses on women’s issues, published an interview featuring Ember in August 2020. They awarded her with the title of BOLD Boss, as a woman "who epitomize[s] diversity, integrity, and tolerance", and they asked her to host interviews, including a live interview with fashion model Erica Lauren, known professionally for her modeling campaigns with brands such as Lane Bryant, Torrid, Foot Locker, and Walmart. Ember has been represented as BOLD Gold by the BOLD Magazine twice in 2020 and is featured in their Body Empowerment 18 month BOLD Boss Calendar of 2021. 2020 was also the year several clothing companies such as Vislily, Dolnine, Rissross, Auselily, Gloria & Sarah, AW Bridal, and Ritera represented Ember as a model for their clothing lines on Amazon. In 2021, KSTP-TVs Twin Cities Live hosted a 'Fall Fashion Must Haves' segment in which Ember modeled Torrid and Aldo products.

In 2021, Ember played an extra in the production film "The Ballad of Travis Hunter". Later in 2021, Ember won the first Miss Voluptuous Minnesota title in the Miss Voluptuous Pageants that originated in England, and she will go on to compete for the International crown and title in Nashville, TN in April 2022. Ember has represented her title of Miss Voluptuous Minnesota in several local parades including St. Anthony Villagefest, Little Canadian Days, Burnsville Fire Muster Parade, Chaska River City Days, Woodbury Days Grande Parade. "To help make a statement, she decided to ride her motorcycle in parades."

The Global United Pageants awarded Ember with the crowned title Grand Ms. Global United Queen 2022 - 2023 and was the second pageant where she received a talent award for a welded crown she handmade. August 2022 aired the Minnesota Lottery Vikings scratch-off commercial where Ember played the role of a cashier.

== Awards ==
| Year | Nominee | Event | Award | Result | Ref. |
|---|---|---|---|---|---|
| 2010 | Amber Davis | Miss Maple Lake | Miss Maple Lake | Nominated | |
| 2019 | Floor Plan | 48 Hour Film Project | Best Use of Character | Won | |
| 2020 | Amber Davis | Miss Minnesota USA | Miss Congeniality | Won | |
| 2021-2022 | Ember | Miss Voluptuous Pageants | Miss Voluptuous Minnesota | Won | |
| 2022 | Ember | Miss Voluptuous International | Best Overall Interview; Video Talent | Won | |
| 2022-2023 | Ember | Global United Pageant | Grand Ms. Global United Queen | Won | |

== Filmography ==
=== Film ===
| Year | Title | Role | Notes |
|---|---|---|---|
| 2018 | Another Door Opens | Detective Gina | Student film |
| 2019 | Arty and the Heist | Arty | Student film |
| 2019 | Floor Plan | Police Captain Monica | Student film |
| 2019 | Candy | Candy | Student film |
| 2020 | The Runner | Talk Show Host | Student film |
| 2021 | The Ballad of Travis Hunter | Extra | Production film |

=== Web series ===
| Year | Title | Role | Notes |
|---|---|---|---|
| 2019 | Cocktail Cooking | Host | 3 episodes |
| 2019-20 | TAKE CARE | Cassie | 5 episodes |

=== Interviews ===
| Year | Title | Role | Notes |
|---|---|---|---|
| 2020 | Erica Lauren | Interviewer | Fashion Model |
| 2020 | Ember | Interviewee | Body Positive Model |
| 2020 | Jahlove Serrano | Interviewer | HIV+ Educator |
