= God Is an Astronaut =

Irish post-rock duo

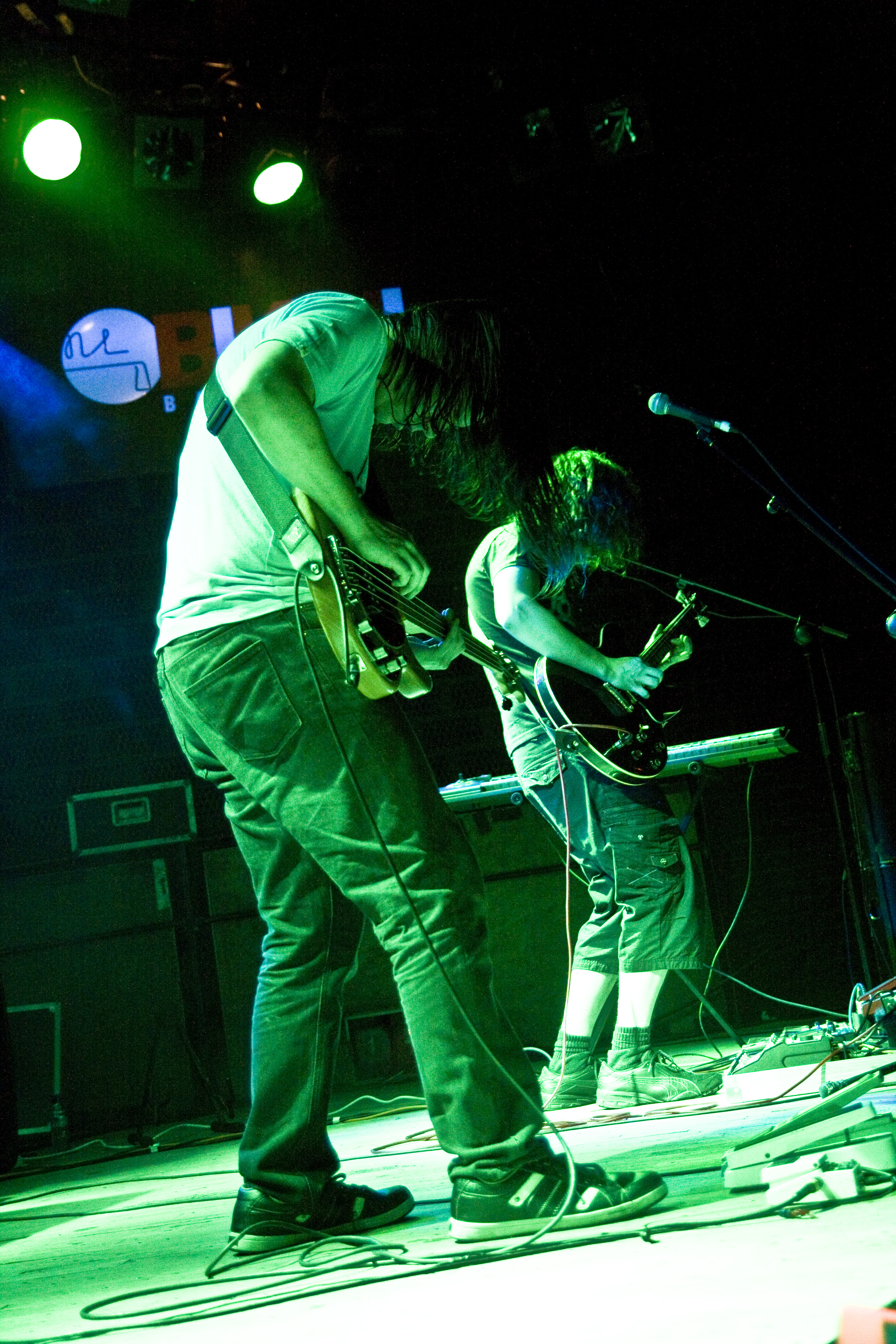
- God Is an Astronaut performing in 2010

Background information
- Also known as: GIAA
- Origin: County Wicklow, Ireland
- Genre: Post-rock
- Years active: 2002–present
- Labels: Napalm Records; Revive; Rocket Girl
- Members: Torsten Kinsella; Niels Kinsella
- Past members: Lloyd Hanney; Gazz Carr; Robert Murphy; Jamie Dean
- Website: godisanastronaut.com
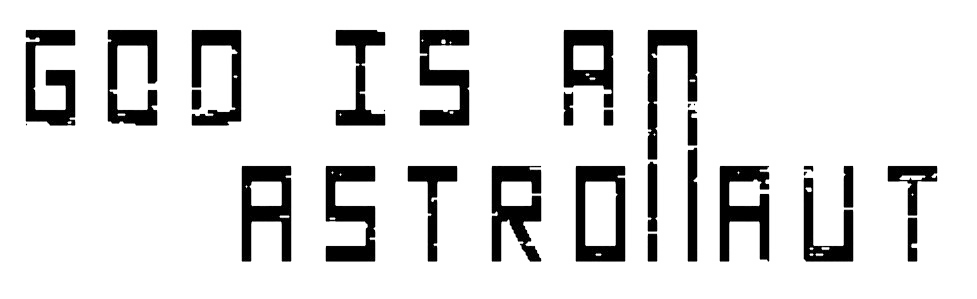

God Is an Astronaut are an Irish post-rock duo from County Wicklow, formed in 2002 by twins Niels and Torsten Kinsella. Their style employs elements of electronic music, krautrock, and space rock, reminiscent of Tangerine Dream. They have released twelve studio albums to date.

== History ==
The band was formed in 2002 by twin brothers Niels and Torsten Kinsella, who took the inspiration for its name from a quote in the movie Nightbreed. God Is an Astronaut's debut album, The End of the Beginning, was released in 2002 on the Revive Records label, which is independently owned by the band. The album was intended to be a farewell to the industry. Two music videos, for "The End of the Beginning" and "From Dust to the Beyond", both produced by the band, received airplay on MTV UK and other MTV Europe networks.

GIAA consider each of their albums to be a sonic "photograph or snapshot of who we are in that moment of time". In mid-2006, a licensing deal with U.K. label Rocket Girl saw both an EP, called A Moment of Stillness, and their second album, All Is Violent, All Is Bright, being re-released.

The band's third album, Far from Refuge, was released in April 2007 on Revive Records and as a download via their website. Their fourth, the self-titled God Is an Astronaut, came out on 7 November 2008. On 12 February 2010, a single was released on the band's website, titled "In the Distance Fading", the second song from their fifth album, called Age of the Fifth Sun, released on 17 May 2010.

In early 2008, GIAA embarked on their first tour of the United States. One day before their return home, $20,000 worth of uninsured equipment was stolen from their van in New Jersey.

The band performed at the Eurosonic Festival in 2012, when Ireland was the "Spotlight Country". Their sixth full-length album, Origins, was released in 2013. They then went on tour, performing in places such as China, Russia, Brazil, and Europe.

In June 2015, the band's seventh full-length album, Helios | Erebus, was released. In 2018, they issued the album Epitaph. In February 2021, GIAA released Ghost Tapes #10 on Napalm Records. In September 2024, they published their eleventh album, Embers. In July 2026, the band released the concert album Live @ Hellfest, filmed the previous month at the Hellfest Summer Open Air in Clisson, France.

== Band members ==
Current

- Torsten Kinsella – vocals, guitars, keyboards (2002–present)
- Niels Kinsella – bass, guitars (2002–present)

Past

- Lloyd Hanney – drums (2003–2025)
- Gazz Carr – keyboards, synthesizer, guitar (2012–13, 2019)
- Robert Murphy – keyboards, synthesizer, guitar (touring, 2017–2019)
- Jamie Dean – keyboards, guitar (2010–2017, 2020–2022)

== Discography ==
- The End of the Beginning (2002)
- All Is Violent, All Is Bright (2005)
- A Moment of Stillness (2006)
- Far from Refuge (2007)
- God Is an Astronaut (2008)
- Age of the Fifth Sun (2010)
- Origins (2013)
- Helios | Erebus (2015)
- Epitaph (2018)
- Ghost Tapes #10 (2021)
- Somnia (2022)
- Embers (2024)
