= Helios / Erebus =

Helios | Erebus

Studio album by God is an Astronaut
- Released: June 21, 2015
- Genre: Post-rock
- Length: 45:12
- Label: Revive Records
- Producer: Torsten Kinsella

God is an Astronaut chronology
Origins (2013)	Helios | Erebus (2015)	Epitaph (2018)

Helios / Erebus is the seventh studio album by Irish post-rock band God Is An Astronaut. It was released through Revive Records on June 21, 2015. The album was recorded and produced by guitarist Torsten Kinsella, then mastered by Tim Young at Metropolis Mastering in London. In March 2015 the band revealed an album preview along with a string of spring tour dates throughout Europe to promote the release.

== Themes ==
The album artwork is based on Aztec art designed by bassist Niels Kinsella. Torsten Kinsella said that the Greek words and imagery were not necessarily related to any central theme, rather they were “names that suited the tracks”. He described the album as having “moments of darkness in it...moments of brightness” a “darker record” conceived from an idea of “apocalyptic culture”. The album is named after the Greek mythological God Helios, the personification of the Sun, and Erebus, the embodiment of darkness. In accordance to the general ancient and mythological subject matter, some of the tracks found on Helios | Erebus feature Latin words and phrases." Furthering in its reference to ancient mythology, the opening track "Agneya" is named after the daughter of the God of Fire in Hindu mythology. Despite no central theme in any specific culture, Kinsella upholds that "mysterious ancient civilizations like the Greeks, Vikings, Mayas, Aztecs [and] Egyptians" are a constant source of inspiration.

== Reception ==
Professional ratings
Review scores
Source	Rating
Broken Amp	positive
PopMatters	7/10 stars

Upon release the album received generally positive reviews among critics. Jordan Blum of PopMatters gave the album a positive review describing it as having “dazzling atmospheres, riveting textural bursts, and poignant serenity”. Rich Buley of Broken Amp said the album was “one of their finest”, “darkest and densest albums to date” and that “amongst all the blazing intensity are passages of gorgeous, drifting ambience” with “versatility and progressive attitude”.

== Track listing ==
No.	Title	Length
1.	"Agneya"	4:58
2.	"Pig Powder"	5:40
3.	"Vetus Memoria"	5:20
4.	"Finem Solis"	5:03
5.	"Helios Erebus"	8:31
6.	"Obscura Somnia"	4:04
7.	"Centralia"	6:47
8.	"Sea of Trees"	4:49
Total length:		45:12

== Personnel ==
God Is An Astronaut

- Torsten Kinsella - guitars, keyboards, vocals, programming
- Niels Kinsella - bass
- Lloyd Hanney - drums
- Jamie Dean - keyboards, guitars, vocals

Production

- Torsten Kinsella – producer, engineering
- Tim Young – mastering
- Niels Kinsella – artwork, design

Additional musicians

- Jimi Scanlan - additional guitar on “Centralia”
