= Airflow Sciences Corporation =

Organization

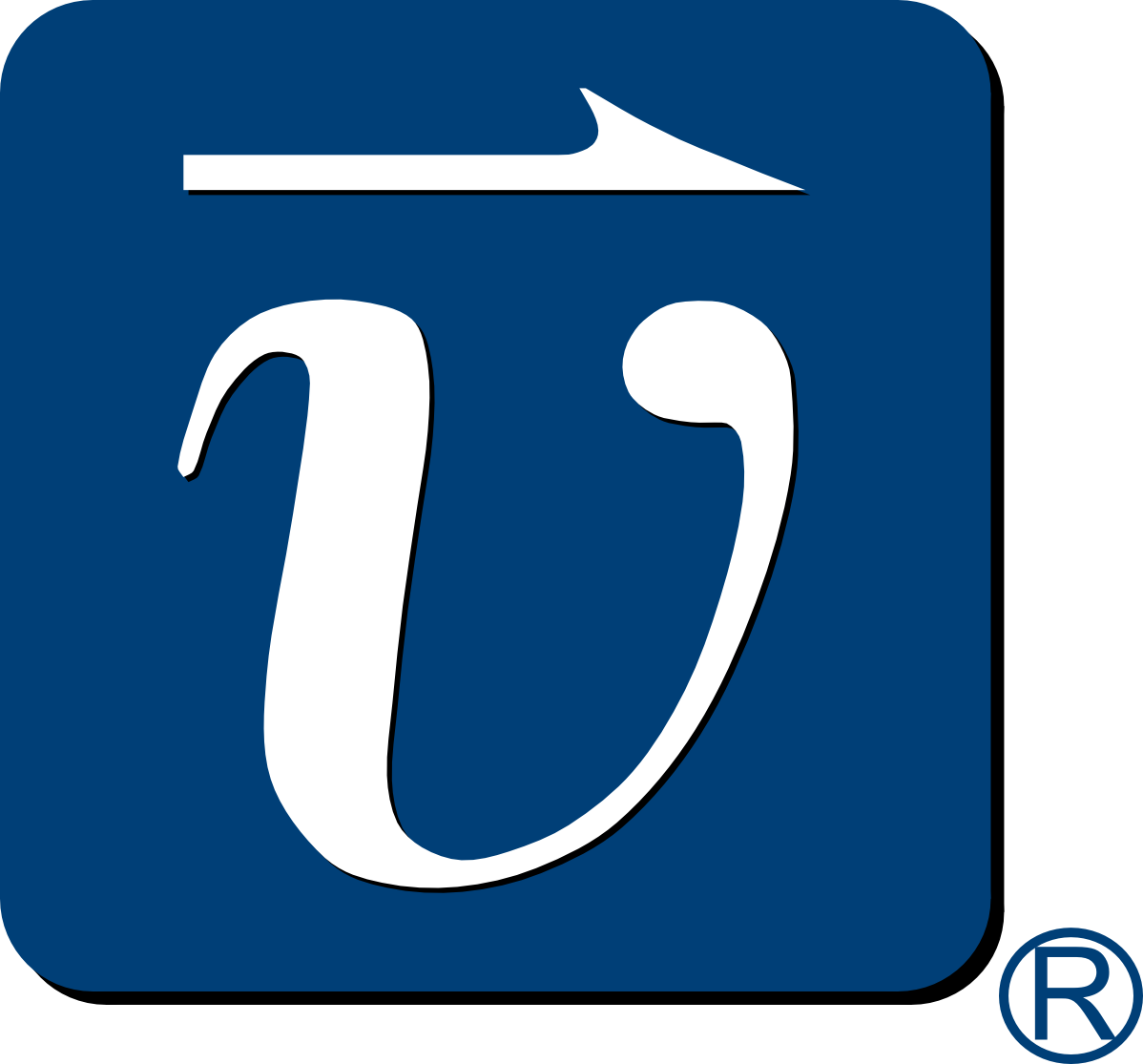
Logo

Airflow Sciences Corporation (ASC) is an engineering consulting company based in Livonia, Michigan, USA that specializes in the design and optimization of equipment and processes involving flow, heat transfer, combustion, and mass transfer. Engineering techniques include Computational Fluid Dynamics (CFD) modeling, experimental laboratory testing, and field measurements at client sites. ASC works for a wide range of industries world-wide, including power generation, manufacturing, aerospace, HVAC, food processing, biomedical, pollution control, oil and gas, rail, legal, and automotive.

In addition to engineering consulting, ASC has a test equipment division that manufactures flow measurement equipment such as data loggers, pressure/flow/temperature instrumentation, wind tunnels, and online flow systems.

== History ==
The company was founded in 1975 by Robert Gielow and James Paul, two Professional Engineers with backgrounds in the aerospace industry. They quickly realized that the analysis techniques they applied to projects such as the Apollo program Moon rockets and commercial aircraft design could be used to advance a wide variety of other industries. Early years of the company were focused on aerodynamic optimization of vehicles such as cars, tractor trailers, and rail cars to minimize drag and fuel consumption. This work involved both wind tunnel testing and numerical simulation.

In the 1970s and 1980s, ASC developed a range of simulation software for potential flow and viscous flow analysis, writing its own CFD solver (VISCOUS). The capabilities of this cartesian-based CFD software eventually included advanced physics such as combustion, particulate transport and drying simulations, time-dependence, and convection/conduction/radiation heat transfer. In the 1990s and early 2000s, ASC personnel developed a new CFD software package, AzoreCFD.

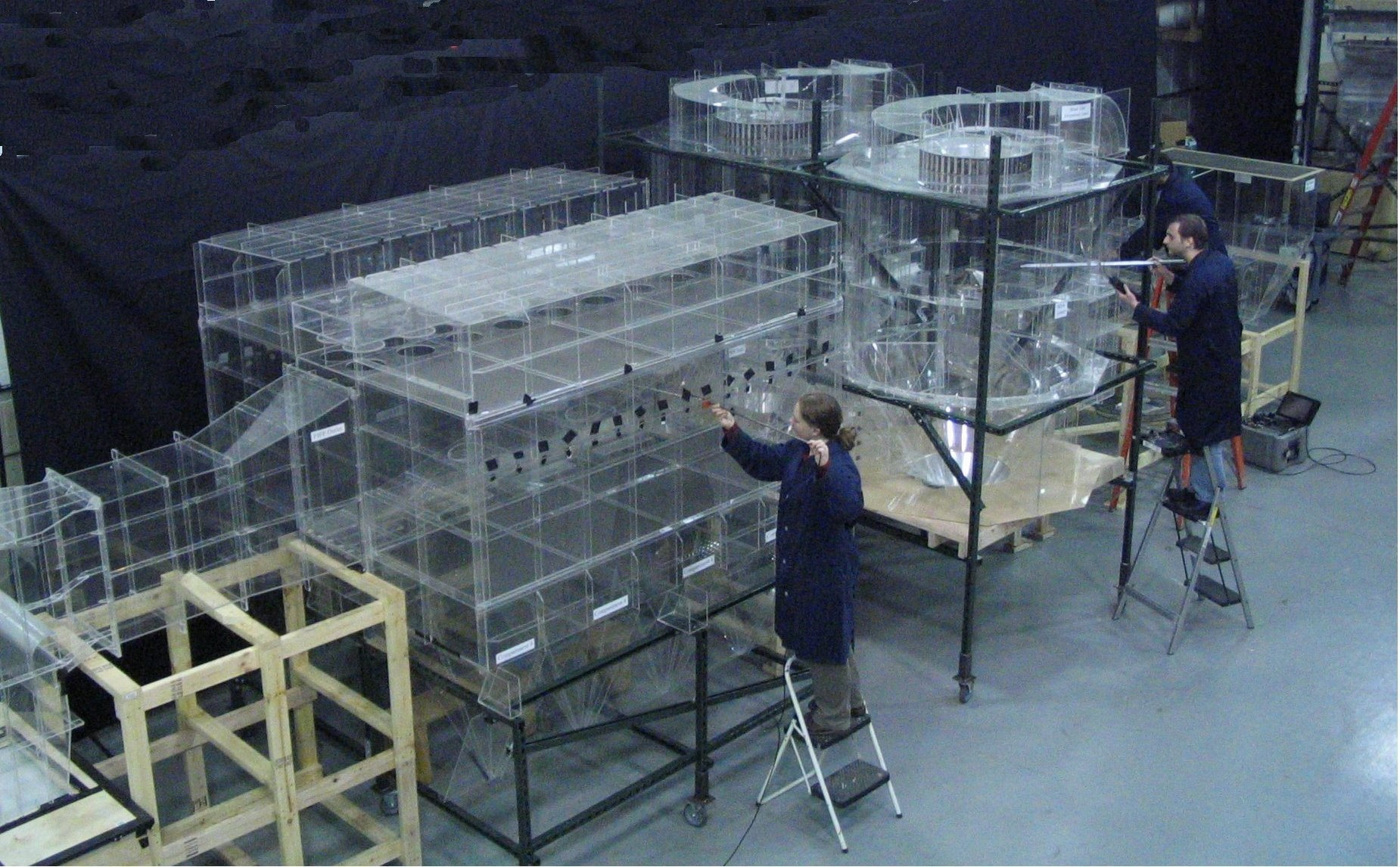
Scale physical model testing of industrial pollution control equipment

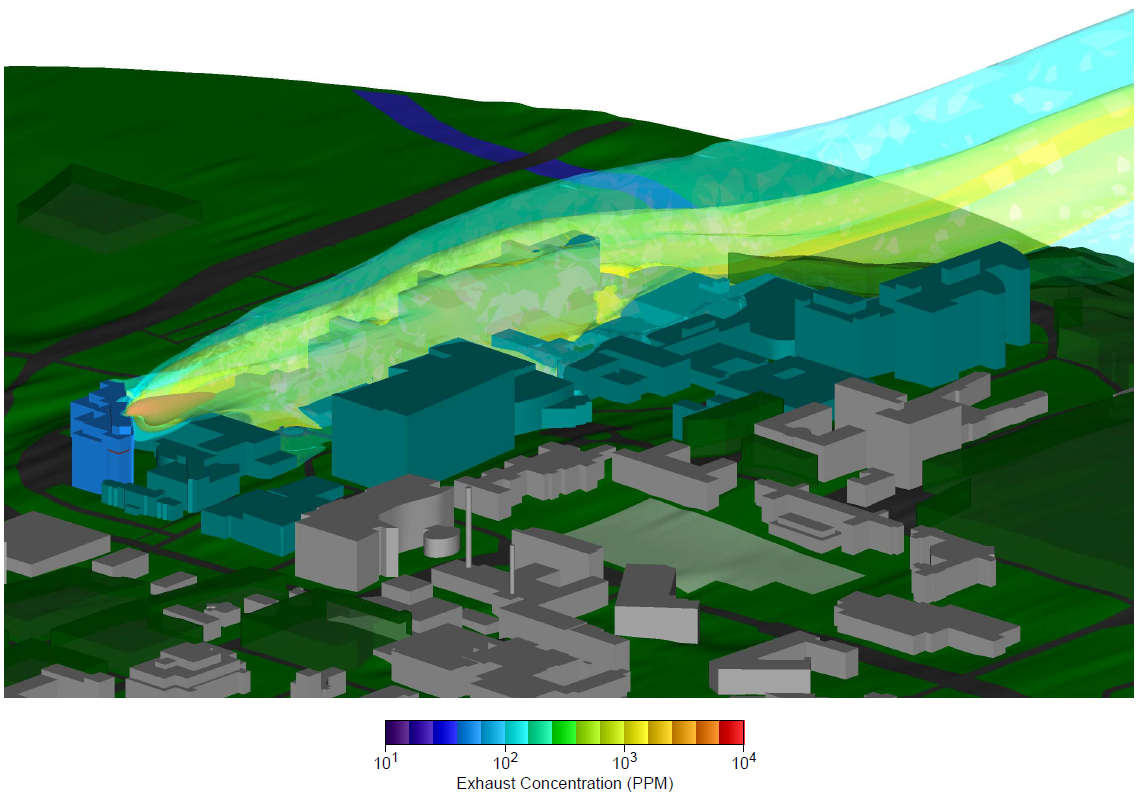
CFD simulation of external flows and plume dispersion for a medical complex

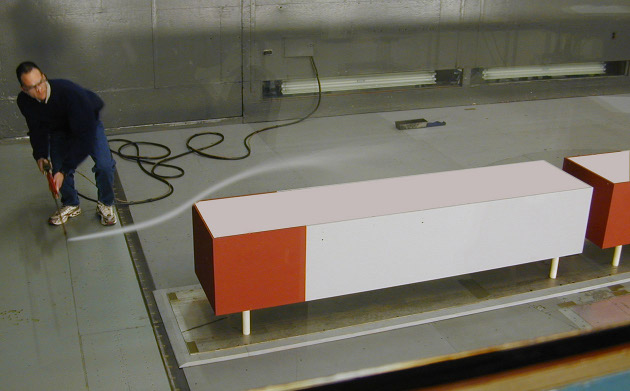
Wind tunnel testing of rail car aerodynamics
