= The End of the Beginning (God Is an Astronaut album) =

Studio album by God Is an Astronaut
- Released: 1 November 2002
- Recorded: 2002
- Genre: Post-rock
- Length: 48:55
- Label: Revive
- Producer: God Is an Astronaut

God Is an Astronaut chronology
The End of the Beginning (2002)	All Is Violent, All Is Bright (2005)

Singles from The End of the Beginning
- 1. "The End of the Beginning" Released: 2003; 2. "From Dust to the Beyond" Released: 2003; 3. "Point Pleasant" Released: 2003

The End of the Beginning is the first studio album by Irish post-rock band God Is an Astronaut. The album was released on 1 November 2002.

Its name is most likely from a famous quote by British war-leader and Prime Minister Winston Churchill, in a speech about the Second Battle of El Alamein: "Now this is not the end, it is not even the beginning of the end. But it is, perhaps, the end of the beginning."

"Fall from the Stars" was used during TV3's coverage of the 2007 Rugby World Cup.

The album was digitally remastered and re-released in 2011.

== Track listing ==
No.	Title	Writer(s)	Length
1.	"The End of the Beginning"	Torsten Kinsella, Niels Kinsella	4:15
2.	"From Dust to the Beyond"	T. Kinsella, N. Kinsella, Noel Healy	5:17
3.	"Ascend to Oblivion"	T. Kinsella, N. Kinsella, Thomas Kinsella	5:00
4.	"Coda"	T. Kinsella, N. Kinsella, N. Healy	5:04
5.	"Remembrance"	T. Kinsella, N. Kinsella, Thomas Kinsella	4:20
6.	"Point Pleasant"	T. Kinsella, N. Kinsella	5:03
7.	"Fall from the Stars"	T. Kinsella, N. Kinsella, Thomas Kinsella	4:27
8.	"Twilight"	T. Kinsella, N. Kinsella	5:03
9.	"Coma"	T. Kinsella, N. Kinsella	1:16
10.	"Route 666"	T. Kinsella, N. Kinsella	4:34
11.	"Lost Symphony"	T. Kinsella, N. Kinsella	5:16
Total length:			48:55

== Personnel ==
God Is an Astronaut

- Torsten Kinsella – guitars, keyboards, vocals, programming
- Niels Kinsella – bass guitar, guitars, keyboards

Additional musician

- Noel Healy – additional percussion (8)

Production

- Pat O'Donnell – co-producer (6, 11)
- Niels Kinsella – artwork
- Tim Young – remaster (2011 reissue)
