= Asch (surname) =

Asch is a surname. Notable people with the surname include:

- Frank Asch (1946–2022), American writer
- Marc Asch (born 1946), American politician
- Moe Asch (1905–1986), founder of Folkways Records, son of Sholem
- Peter Asch (born 1948), American water polo player
- Ricardo Asch (born 1947), Argentinian endocrinologist
- Roland Asch (born 1950), German race car driver
- Sholem Asch (1880–1957), Polish Yiddish writer
- Solomon Asch (1907–1996), Polish-American psychologist
- Tim Asch (1932–1994), American photographer and filmmaker

== See also ==
- Asche (surname)
- Ash (surname)
- Ashe (name)
