= Ghost Tapes 10 =

Ghost Tapes #10

Studio album by God Is an Astronaut
- Released: 12 February 2021
- Genre: Post-rock
- Length: 37:26
- Label: Napalm

God Is an Astronaut chronology
Epitaph (2018)	Ghost Tapes #10 (2021)	Somnia (2022)

Ghost Tapes #10 is the ninth studio album by Irish post-rock band God Is an Astronaut. It was released in February 2021 through Napalm Records.

== Critical reception ==
Ghost Tapes #10
Review scores
Source	Rating
Sputnikmusic	3.3/5
Metal Injection	7/10

Ghost Tapes #10 was released to positive critical reception. Tim Peacock, writing for Dead Press, gave it an 8/10, calling it a "deeply intense record", though he considered parts of the album repetitive. Jay H. Gorania for Blabbermouth.net held the album in high regard, awarding a 9/10 score. Gorania described the album's quality as being "jaw-dropping", capable of making listeners forget about the lack of vocals. Max Morin of Metal Injection was less impressed. Morin gave the album a 7/10 but noted that the album was not adventurous for the band, but that it would please fans.

== Track listing ==
No.	Title	Length
1.	"Adrift"	6:57
2.	"Burial"	6:04
3.	"In Flux"	6:08
4.	"Spectres"	4:29
5.	"Fade"	5:37
6.	"Barren Trees"	4:11
7.	"Luminous Waves"	3:48
