= Shola Aur Shabnam =

Shola Aur Shabnam (lit. 'Embers and Dew') may refer to these Indian films:

- Shola Aur Shabnam (1961 film), a Hindi film directed by Ramesh Saigal
- Shola Aur Shabnam (1992 film), a Hindi film directed by David Dhawan
