= Asche (surname) =

Asche is a surname. Notable people with the surname include:

- Austin Asche (1925–2024), Australian judge
- Cody Asche (born 1990), American baseball coach
- Jochen Asche (20th century), East German luger
- Oscar Asche (1871–1936), Australian actor, director and writer

== See also ==
- Asch (surname)
