= Autonomous Shipboard Humanoid =

Autonomous Shipboard Humanoid (ASH) is a project at the United States Naval Research Laboratory with researchers and engineers from Virginia Tech and University of Pennsylvania to create a ship-based robot for defense purposes. The robot is intended to navigate the ship and climb ladders, as well as fight fires and respond to other emergencies as well as visual commands from humans. It can currently walk, among other abilities.

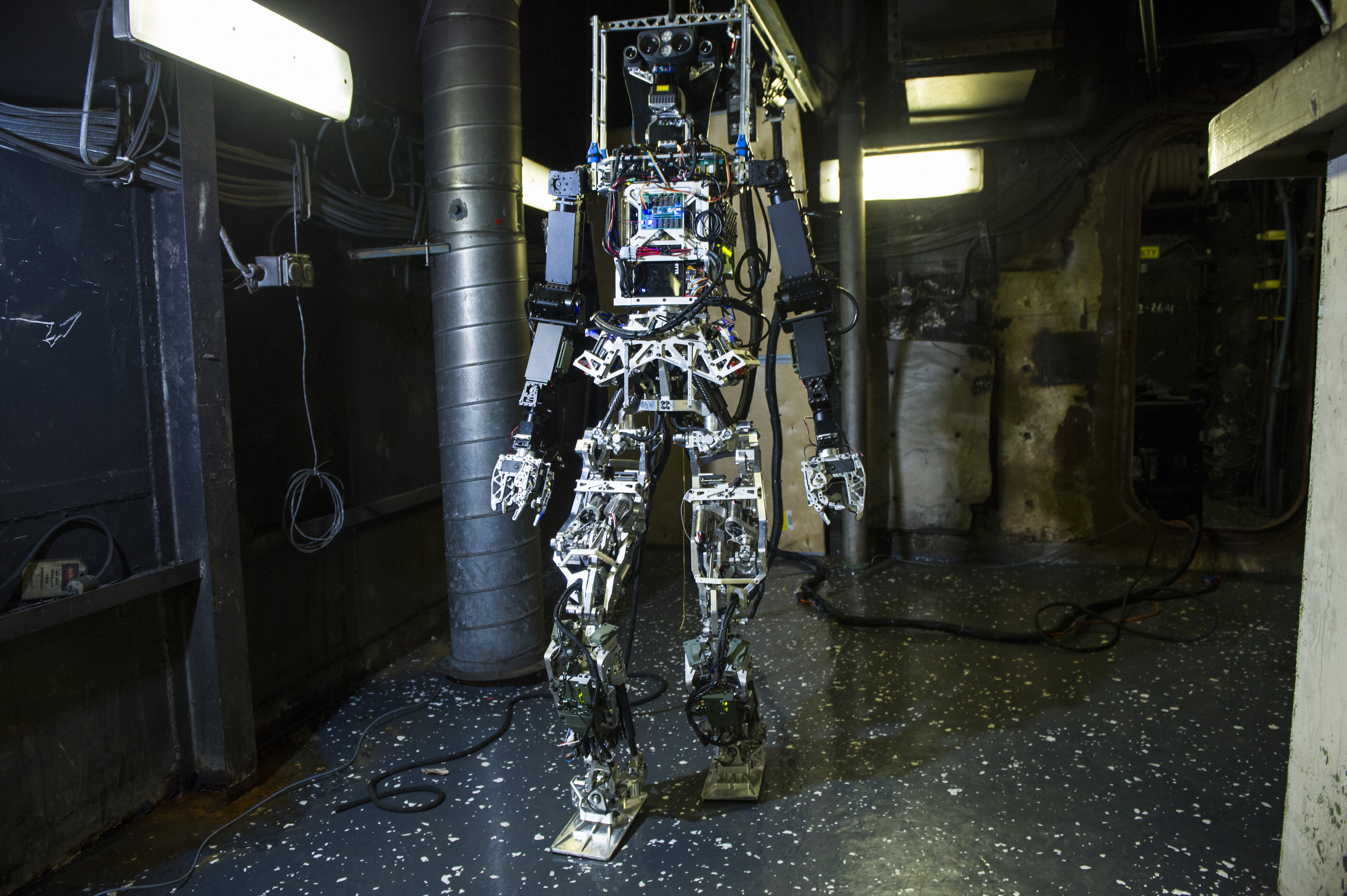
Robot testing

Since 2013 the project has been completed with limited amounts of information released by the Navy or any other entity. The humanoid was worked on by the Office of Naval Research and Texas Tech University for applications in the Navy. The Office of Naval Research or (ONR) is Navy's research and development branch that researches new technology and how it can affect naval lives. The project was made so that the lives of naval personnel would not be threatened in fires that are too dangerous to fight. The robot utilizes a mass number of sensors to have direction, heat awareness and obstacle detectors. The project is not very large, simply because of all the abilities it has and the innovations that it Carries while still being able to put out the fire with the hose trigger system it possesses. The project does not have very much information released after completion so no definitive status as to the success of the project. Several known tests were conducted and a few pictures were released along with a video showcasing the abilities and effectiveness of the robot.

== Design ==
The humanoid was made by the navy with cooperation of Texas tech research and development and the completion was released in 2015. Not much is known about the humanoid because the navy has not released much information on the subject. The only things that are known is the completion date, abilities of the humanoid, and testing videos and pictures that were released. The humanoid needed several requirements in order to be utilized by the navy where space and movement are extremely restricted. The ability of the robot to maneuver relies all on the ability of the sensors that are put in place to effectively move the humanoid. The sensors that allow direction to be monitored have to be precise in order for the robot to be able to maneuver through the dense, smoky and tight spaces of a ship. The robot possesses a hose trigger system that allows it to aim and put out fires. The robot also needed to also withstand extreme temperatures that are caused by fires, which include combustibles, fuel and chemical fires. These fires can occur at any point in time and the humanoid needs to be able to respond at a moment’s notice.

== Other options ==
The technology used in the humanoid can be accessible and applied to other uses. These uses were considered when the project was considered a success when tested by the navy. The differing actions that could be taken for the technology included a firefighting use on houses where the heat or steam is way too hot for humans to enter. It has also been used by the army as a lead fighter able to shoot at any enemy. The other use for the military is a battle field extraction robot that is able to retrieve injured personnel when a fight is occurring. The ability to save lives while keeping military personnel out of the line of fire. Doctors are using this technology to do surgery and important procedures that are extremely delicate for any person. The robot would be able to perform the duties required in the room in a timely and effective manner. The ability of the technology to be applied to most dangerous jobs allows the humanoid to be utilized in any environment. The Office of Naval Research has been utilizing technology of this kind for an extremely long time, however this is one of the biggest projects they have ever done.

== Office of Naval Research (ONR) ==
The program that is heading this new project and its widespread effects on the navy have been working on projects that help the United States Navy keep up with the continuing changing times. The office was created in 1946 to work with schools and universities in order to encourage scientific research in institutions for more advancements in the Navy. The office has worked on hundreds of projects of all different ranges in an attempt to get students involved in the STEM programs. These projects all have the same goal, however the differing demographics and differing ideas allow for a wide variety of innovations to be made.
