= Ember (video game) =

2016 role-playing video game

- Developer: N-Fusion Interactive
- Publisher: 505 Games
- Platforms: Microsoft Windows, IOS, Mac Os
- Release: September 9, 2016
- Genre: RPG

Ember is an isometric role-playing game developed by N-Fusion Interactive and published by 505 Games. The game was released on iOS and Windows. Ember was inspired by the 1992 video game Ultima VII: The Black Gate and has received pre-release comparisons to the Ultima series and to Baldur's Gate. The game was initially meant to release in 2014 and 2015, but was pushed back in order to expand the game.

== Overview ==
Gameplay takes place in an open world, which players can freely explore. Players start the game in a small dungeon, which they must escape to progress in the game. Once free, the user will play as a Lightbringer tasked with saving the game's world. They must also find a way to save the world's most valuable resource, embers, which can be used for their power, worn as jewelry, or set free, requiring morality based decision making.

The game features a branching story, weapons-based skill system, and crafting. Combat will occur in real-time but can be paused, and the game takes about 20 hours for players to complete.

== Reviews ==
In 2015 Time magazine called Ember one of their "10 Most-Anticipated New iPhone Games", based on the demo released by N-Fusion.
