= Ember (given name) =

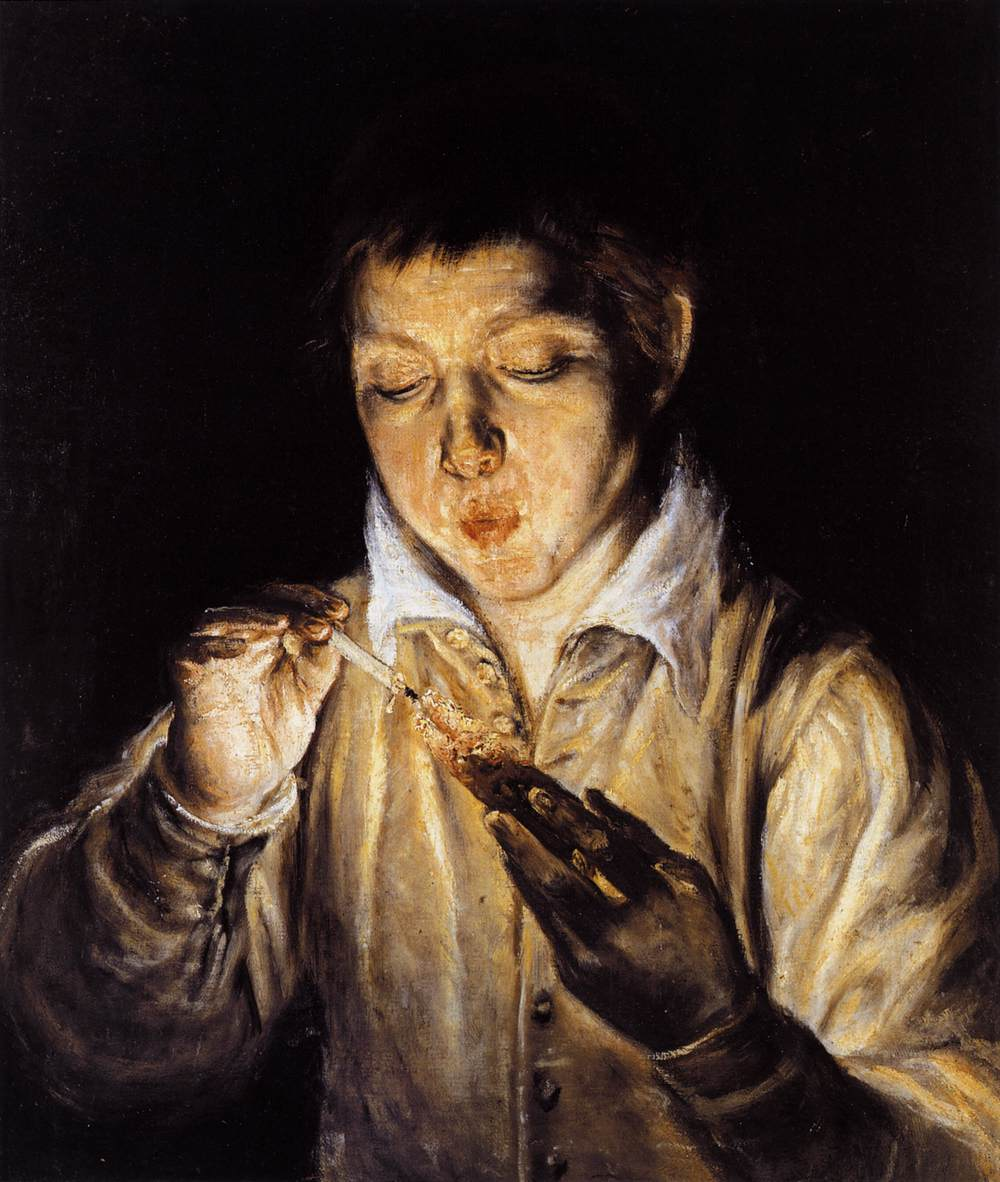
- A Boy Blowing on an Ember to Light a Candle by El Greco.
- Gender: Unisex

Origin
- Origin: English
- Meaning: “ember”

Ember is a modern English name taken from the vocabulary word meaning “lump of hot coal.”

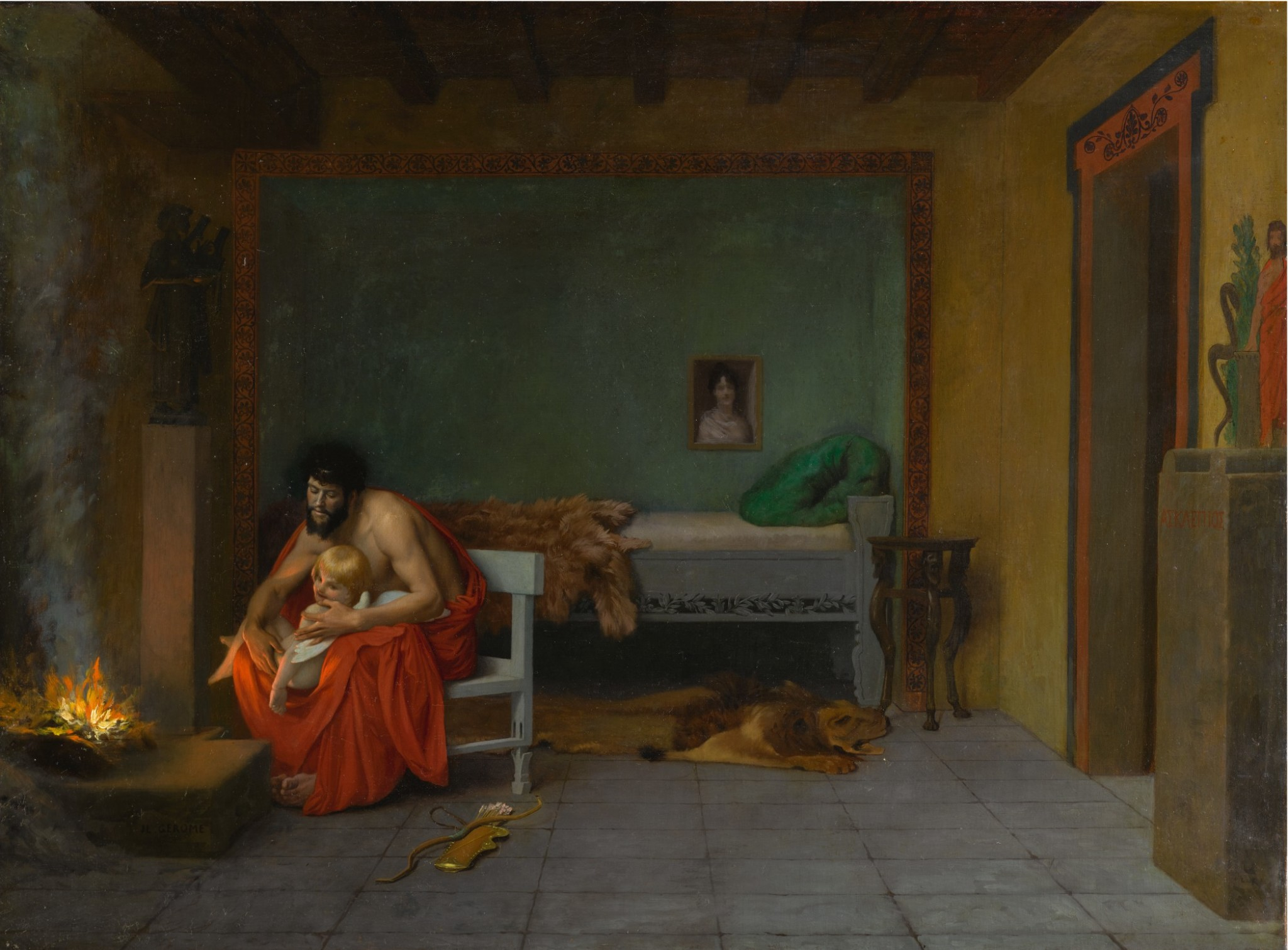
The Story of Anacreon 2--Young Love's Shivering Limbs the Embers Warm, by Jean-Léon Gérôme, ca. 1899.

== Popularity ==
Ember has been among the top one thousand names for newborn girls in the United States since 2009 and among the top two hundred most popular names for American newborn girls since 2019. It is also in occasional use for boys in the United States. It has been one of the top five hundred names for newborn girls in England and Wales since 2018.

Elaborations of the name, many influenced by popular sound patterns and other names such as Amber and Kimberly, are also well used in the United States for girls. Elaborated forms of the name include: Emberlee, Emberlei, Emberleigh, Emberley, Emberli, Emberlie, Emberlin, Emberly, Emberlyn, Emberlynn, Emberlynne, and Embersyn.

== Women ==
- Ember Reichgott Junge (born 1953), American lawyer, radio personality and former Minnesota state senator.
- Ember Oakley, American lawyer and Wyoming state politician
- Ember Swift, Canadian singer, songwriter and guitarist

== Stage name ==
- Amber Davis, known professionally as Ember, (born 1992), American model and actress
- Adrienne Reese, American professional wrestler known by the ring name Ember Moon.

== Fictional characters ==
- Ember Lumen, protagonist from the 2023 Pixar film Elemental
- Ember McLain, from Danny Phantom
- Ember Memeelis, protagonist from the Webcomic Bloodline
