= Far from Refuge =

Album by God Is an Astronaut

Studio album by God Is an Astronaut
- Released: 5 April 2007
- Genre: Post-rock
- Length: 41:56
- Label: Revive Records

God Is an Astronaut chronology
A Moment of Stillness (EP) (2006)	Far from Refuge (2007)	God Is an Astronaut (2008)

Professional ratings
Review scores
Source	Rating
Drowned in Sound	(7/10)

Far from Refuge is the third studio album by Irish post-rock band God Is an Astronaut, released in 2007 on Revive Records. The album was digitally remastered and re-released in 2011.

In December 2007, American webzine Somewhere Cold ranked Far from Refuge No. 9 on their 2007 Somewhere Cold Awards Hall of Fame.

== Track listing ==
No.	Title	Length
1.	"Radau"	5:51
2.	"Far from Refuge"	6:52
3.	"Sunrise in Aries"	4:21
4.	"Grace Descending"	5:30
5.	"New Years End"	4:16
6.	"Darkfall"	3:41
7.	"Tempus Horizon"	5:07
8.	"Lateral Noise"	1:52
9.	"Beyond the Dying Light"	5:34

Japanese Edition
No.	Title	Length
10.	"Sunny Banks of Sweet Deliverance"	4:32
11.	"Empyrean Glow"	2:22
