= Le Cordon Bleu College of Culinary Arts Minneapolis/St. Paul =

- Type: Private, For Profit
- Active: 1999–2017
- Location: 1315 Mendota Heights Road, Mendota Heights, Minnesota, USA; 44°51′59″N 93°9′36″W
- Website: http://www.chefs.edu/locations/minneapolis-st-paul

Le Cordon Bleu College of Culinary Arts Minneapolis/Saint Paul was founded in 1999. The college is owned by Career Education Corporation under a licensing agreement with Le Cordon Bleu in Paris. It closed in 2017 along with all other Le Cordon Bleu colleges in the United States in the wake of changing federal loan guidelines.

== History ==
Le Cordon Bleu College of Culinary Arts was founded by Brown College in 1999. The school began offering a Le Cordon Bleu Culinary Program that year, the first to be offered in North America. It started as a Certificate Program and began offering Associate in Applied Science degrees in 2002. An Associate in Applied Science in Patisserie & Baking was added the following year. These programs were strictly offered through Brown College until 2005.

In 2005, the Brown College degree programs were transformed into a new institution: Le Cordon Bleu College of Culinary Arts Minneapolis/St. Paul. The school was a branch campus of Western Culinary Institute in Portland, Oregon. In December 2015, students allegedly received an email declaring that the institution would stop enrolling students in the Spring 2016 semester, and that the school would close by September 2017. According to a final update to the branch's website, "LCB stopped accepting applications from re-entering former students effective April 29, 2016."
