= Age of the Fifth Sun =

Studio album by God Is an Astronaut
- Released: 17 May 2010
- Genre: Post-rock
- Length: 47:09
- Label: Revive Records

God Is an Astronaut chronology
God is an Astronaut (2008)	Age of the Fifth Sun (2010)	Origins (2013)

Professional ratings
Review scores
Source	Rating
Rocksound.tv	7/10
Sputnikmusic	2.5/5 stars

Age of the Fifth Sun is the fifth studio album by Irish post-rock band God Is an Astronaut. The first single, "In the Distance Fading", was released on 12 February 2010. The album itself was available for pre-order from 16 April 2010 and released on 17 May 2010. The album art is an original painting by Dave King.

== Track listing ==
No.	Title	Length
1.	"Worlds in Collision"	7:39
2.	"In the Distance Fading"	4:31
3.	"Lost Kingdom"	5:23
4.	"Golden Sky"	6:33
5.	"Dark Rift"	5:08
6.	"Parallel Highway"	3:56
7.	"Shining Through"	5:08
8.	"Age of the Fifth Sun"	6:28
9.	"Paradise Remains"	2:25
