= ASC (dinghy) =

British naval boat

Boat
- Crew: 1–8
- Draft: 0.26 m (10 in) plate up 1.14 m (3 ft 9 in) down

Hull
- Hull weight: 480 kg (1,060 lb)
- LOA: 16.5 ft (5.0 m)
- Beam: 2.025 m (6 ft 7.7 in)

Sails
- Mainsail area: 127.5 sq ft (11.85 m^{2})
- Jib/genoa area: 44 sq ft (4.1 m^{2})
- Upwind sail area: 171.5 sq ft (15.93 m^{2})

The ASC or Admiralty Sailing Craft (sometimes incorrectly called Admiralty Sea Cadet) is a purpose-built, rugged GRP or wood sailing dinghy, historically with gunter rig, with a Bermuda rig optional, designed for use by UK naval and sea cadet establishments as a pulling or sailing dinghy.

It is a substantial craft, usually left on a mooring in quiet waters rather than being slipway launched. It is intended for a total crew of up to 8 although it can be sculled single-handed.

It has a heavy metal centreplate, and is equipped for pulling in addition to sailing. There is also a sculling notch on the transom.

This type of boat is gradually being phased out of the Sea Cadets due to the production of the new Trinity 500 rowing boats. As of 2012, ASCs are no longer in use on cadet courses, and have been completely replaced by trinity 500s
