= Ash (near Stourpaine) =

Hamlet in Dorset, England

Coordinates: 50.892°N 02.194°W

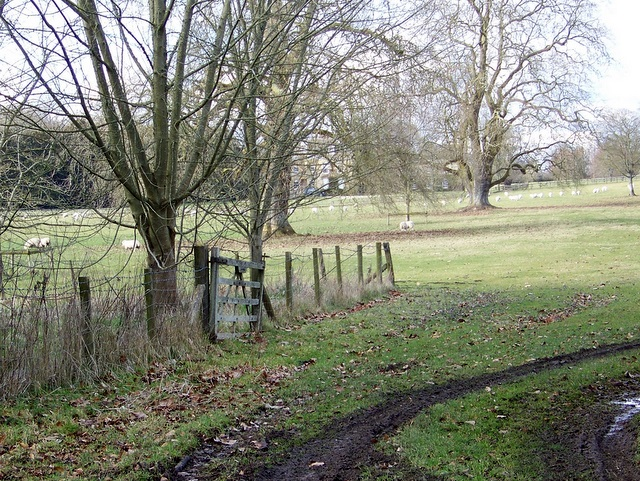
- Bridleway at Ash

- Location within Dorset
- OS grid reference: ST8610
- Civil parish: Stourpaine
- Unitary authority: Dorset
- Ceremonial county: Dorset
- Region: South West
- Country: England
- Sovereign state: United Kingdom
- Police: Dorset
- Fire: Dorset and Wiltshire
- Ambulance: South Western

Ash is a hamlet approximately 0.5 miles (1 km) north of the village of Stourpaine, Dorset, England.

Ash was listed in the Domesday Book of 1086.
