= Shola (name) =

- Gender: Unisex
- Language: Yoruba

Origin
- Origin: Nigeria
- Region of origin: South western Nigeria

Other names
- Variant form: Sola

Shola (variant Sola) is a Yoruba given name.

== People with the given name ==
- Shola Adisa-Farrar (born 1985), American musician
- Shola Akinlade, Nigerian programmer and businessperson
- Shola Ama (born 1979), British singer
- Shola Ameobi (born 1981), Nigerian footballer
- Shola Adewusi (born 1963), British actress
- Shola Allyson (born 1970s), Nigerian singer
- Shola Jimoh (born 2008), Canadian soccer player
- Sola Kosoko (born 1976), Nigerian film actress and director
- Shola Lynch (born 1969), American filmmaker, artist and athlete
- Shola Mos-Shogbamimu (born 1975), British-Nigerian lawyer and women's rights activist
- Shola Olatoye (born 1975), American housing administrator
- Sola Sobowale (born 1963), Nigerian film actress, screenwriter, director and producer
- Shola Oyedele (born 1984), Nigerian footballer
- Shola von Reinhold, British writer
- Shola Shoretire (born 2004), English footballer
- Shola Allyson (born 1971), Nigerian musician and songwriter
- Dorcas Shola-Fapson, British-Nigerian actor and television presenter

== Fictional characters with the given name ==
- Shola Inkosi, a character in Marvel comics
