= God Is an Astronaut (album) =

Studio album by God Is an Astronaut
- Released: November 1, 2008
- Recorded: October 2007 – October 2008
- Genre: Post-rock
- Length: 60:52
- Label: Revive Records, Happy Prince, Morningrise Records
- Producer: God Is An Astronaut

God Is an Astronaut chronology
Far from Refuge (2007)	God Is an Astronaut (2008)	Age of the Fifth Sun (2010)

Professional ratings
Review scores
Source	Rating
AllMusic	4/5 stars

God Is an Astronaut is a self-titled studio album by Irish post-rock band God Is an Astronaut. It was released digitally on November 1, 2008. It was released on CD on November 8, 2008, through Revive Records. It was released on vinyl LP by Morningrise Records and in Japan, with bonus live tracks, in 2009. The album was mastered by Tim Young at Metropolis Mastering in London and produced by the band.

In December 2008, American webzine Somewhere Cold voted God Is an Astronaut Album of the Year in their "2008 Somewhere Cold Awards Hall of Fame."

== Critical reception ==
AllMusic wrote that "the melodies at the heart of these tunes are romantic and often darkly sentimental, but they are delivered in a Wall of Sound of loud guitars and sprawling synthesizer textures that do a great job of evoking the vast fiery spaces and restless mood of the cover artwork."

== Track listing ==
All songs written by Torsten Kinsella, Niels Kinsella, Lloyd Hanney, Thomas Kinsella, Zachary Dutton Hanney, and Colm Hassett

No.	Title	Length
1.	"Shadows"	5:11
2.	"Post Mortem"	5:52
3.	"Echoes"	5:10
4.	"Snowfall"	6:41
5.	"First Day of Sun"	3:37
6.	"No Return"	7:04
7.	"Zodiac"	5:41
8.	"Remaining Light"	5:30
9.	"Shores of Orion"	5:15
10.	"Loss"	10:51

Japanese Edition
No.	Title	Length
11.	"A Moment of Stillness (Live)"	4:06
12.	"Point Pleasant (Live)"	4:59
13.	"A Deafening Distance (Live)"	3:42

== Personnel ==
God Is an Astronaut

- Torsten Kinsella – guitars, piano, mandolin, synths
- Niels Kinsella – bass
- Lloyd Hanney – drums

Additional musicians

- Chris Hanney – additional guitar (2, 3)
- Dara O'Brien – sitar (4, 7, 9)
- Colm Hassett – percussion (7, 9, 10)
- Zachary Dutton-Hanney – additional guitar (10)

Production

- Tim Young – mastering
- Torsten Kinsella – mixing
- Dave King – artwork
- Niels Kinsella – design
