= Zoltán Ember =

Hungarian serial killer (1962–2015)

- Born: 1962; Szentkirályszabadja, Hungary
- Died: April 25, 2015 (aged 52–53); Szeged, Hungary
- Other names: "The Szentkirályszabadja Monster" "The Loop Killer"
- Convictions: Murder x5 Attempted murder x1
- Penalty: Life imprisonment

Details
- Victims: 5
- Span of crimes: 1991–2004
- Country: Hungary
- State: Veszprém
- Date apprehended: March 2004

Zoltán Ember (1962 – April 25, 2015), known as The Szentkirályszabadja Monster, was a Hungarian serial killer who killed four elderly people and his brother between 1991 and 2004 in Szentkirályszabadja. Convicted of these crimes and sentenced to life imprisonment, he hanged himself in 2015.

== Early life ==
Zoltán Ember was born in 1962, spending his childhood in Szentkirályszabadja, where he and his family lived in squalid conditions. His drunken father regularly abused his family, including Zoltán. After his death, his mother remarried to another villager, István Véghelyi, but he was also violent towards them. After finishing elementary school, Ember started work as a butcher, dropping out of school due to his work. He eventually quit, and began working at construction sites. Around this time, he began committing various crimes, for which he was prosecuted 11 times and imprisoned on five occasions. In the late 1980s, he attempted to kill his Russian girlfriend Ludmilla during an argument by stabbing her with a knife, but she survived and informed the authorities, who arrested Ember. He was found guilty of attempted murder and given a 3-year sentence in prison.

== Murders ==
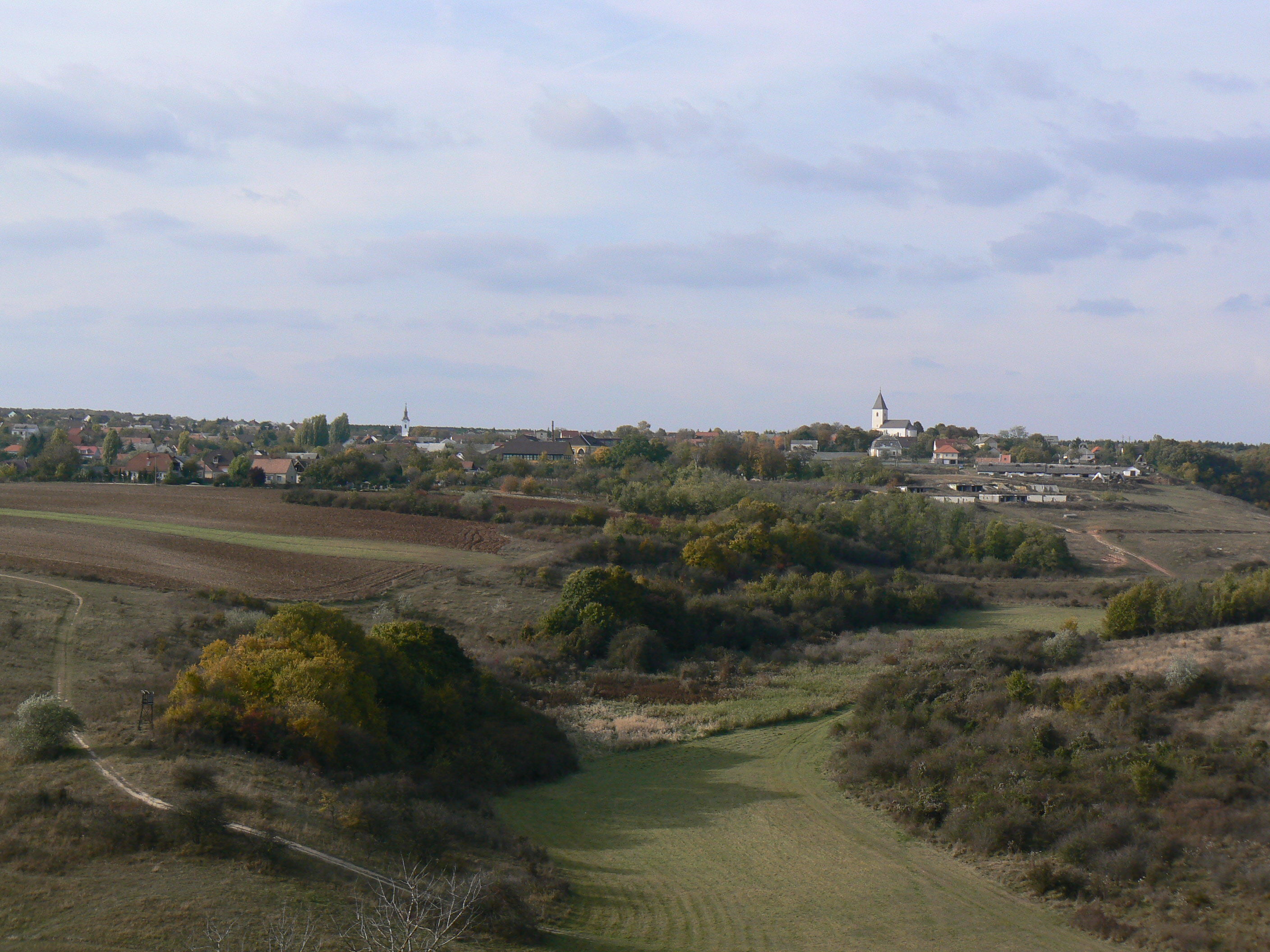
Szentkirályszabadja, the location of the murders

On October 12, 1991, just after he had been released from prison, Ember decided to take revenge on Véghelyi for all the suffering he endured from him in his childhood. He went to the old man's home in Szentkirályszabadja, where he smashed his skull in with a large wrench and then looted his apartment, stealing 30,000 forints. Investigators suspected that Ember might've been the culprit, but had insufficient evidence to arrest him.

Over the next few years, Ember continued to work in construction, but also made money on the side by committing petty thefts and then spending it all on pubs. In 1999, while having a drink with his 49-year-old brother István, Zoltán suggested that they sell the house they jointly owned. István objected, and a heated dispute began between the two brothers, resulting in Zoltán strangling István with his bare hands. He then tied up the corpse and transported it to the outskirts of town in a wheelbarrow, where he buried it in an open field. István Ember's body was found months later by a homeless man, but coroners were unable to identify him, and he was buried in an unmarked grave.

In the early 2000s, Ember began harboring the thought that he could make money off the elderly residents of Szentkirályszabadja, rationalizing that they had significant amounts of cash in their homes. On the night of July 7, 2002, he surprised 87-year-old Károlyné Horváth at her home, using a torture method seen from the movies: he tied a noose around his victim's neck and legs, and in an effort to free herself, Horváth strangled herself. On June 22, 2003, he broke into the house of 83-year-old Pál Jankó, beating him up before tying him up in the loop. Jankó was left to suffocate, finally succumbing a month after he was left in the position by his assailant. By this time, police were aware that a serial murderer was active in Szentkirályszabadja, but had no solid leads or witnesses pointing to a viable suspect. Fear prevailed in the settlement at the time, with the elderly villagers locking themselves inside their homes, setting up alarms and keeping emergency services within reach of them. On March 7, 2004, Ember committed another robbery and used his trademark method, killing 82-year-old Károlyné Pinter and stealing 160,000 forints worth of cash and jewellery from the house. Unbeknownst to him, in his careless ransacking of the home, he left behind DNA evidence at the crime scene.

== Arrest and confessions ==
The investigating authorities, assuming that the killer was familiar with the village and was possibly a resident of it, collected DNA samples from everybody. Using this method, they identified Zoltán Ember as the perpetrator and arrested him only a few days after the last murder. Ember was brought in for interrogation, initially denying any knowledge of the three murders, but then admitted to them, claiming that his motivation for each was profit and that he had been drunk when committing them. Later on, he would also admit to killing Véghelyi and his brother István.

== Trial, imprisonment and death ==
At his initial trial, Zoltán Ember was sentenced to life imprisonment without the possibility of parole by the Veszprém County Court. In 2007, he appealed his sentence to the Győr Parole Board, which upheld the initial verdict, finalizing the sentence and transferring Ember to the Csillag Prison in Szeged. Throughout the proceedings, Ember appeared to be completely apathetic and uncaring about what would happen to him, answering questions addressed to him in a cheeky, almost cynical manner with a smile on his face. When interviewed by reporters in prison, he alluded to the possibility of additional murders, and openly expressed his lack of guilt, claiming that the only thing he was remorseful for was that he had missed out on stealing 122,000 forints from one of the crime scenes.

While serving his sentence, Ember attempted suicide on two separate occasions, first attempting to cut his veins and then drinking nicotine. On April 24, 2015, he was found hanging in his cell, having used a bedsheet to fashion a makeshift rope. He was transported to a hospital, but upon arrival, doctors pronounced him as braindead and confirmed the manner of death as a suicide.

== See also ==
- List of serial killers by country
