= A Moment of Stillness =

EP by God Is an Astronaut
- Released: 21 August 2006
- Genre: Post-rock
- Length: 21:29
- Label: Revive Records

God Is an Astronaut chronology
All Is Violent, All Is Bright (2005)	A Moment of Stillness (2006)	Far from Refuge (2007)

Professional ratings
Review scores
Source	Rating
Allmusic	(not rated) link

A Moment of Stillness is the third release and first EP by Irish post-rock band God Is an Astronaut. The track "Forever Lost (Reprise)" is a reprise of "Forever Lost" from All Is Violent, All Is Bright. In 2015, the song "Endless Dream" was featured on the 76th episode of Welcome to Night Vale.

== Track listing ==
1. "Frozen Twilight" – 6:20
2. "A Moment of Stillness" – 4:47
3. "Forever Lost (Reprise)" – 5:37
4. "Elysian Fields" – 3:25
5. "Crystal Canyon" – 2:00

Bonus tracks (digital release on Bandcamp)

1. "Endless Dream" – 3:54
2. "Empyrean Glow" – 2:21
3. "Sweet Deliverance" – 4:36
4. "Dark Solstice" – 4:44
