= Ash Mountain (Montana) =

Mountain in Montana, United States

- Location within Montana

Highest point
- Elevation: 10,248 ft (3,124 m) NAVD 88
- Prominence: 143 ft (44 m)
- Coordinates: 45°06′01″N 110°32′58″W

Geography
- Location: Park County, Montana, U.S.
- Parent range: Rocky Mountains
- Topo map: USGS Ash Mountain

Ash Mountain is a mountain located in Park County, Montana, USA.
