= All Is Violent, All Is Bright =

Studio album by God Is an Astronaut
- Released: 4 February 2005
- Genre: Post-rock
- Length: 47:09
- Label: Revive Records
- Producer: God Is an Astronaut

God Is an Astronaut chronology
The End of the Beginning (2002)	All Is Violent, All Is Bright (2005)	A Moment of Stillness (2006)

Professional ratings
Review scores
Source	Rating
AllMusic	3/5 stars
Drowned in Sound	(9/10)
rockmetal.pl	(9/10)
Sputnikmusic	(3.5/5)

All Is Violent, All Is Bright is the second studio album by Irish post-rock band God Is an Astronaut, released in 2005. The enhanced CD also contains an mp3 of the song "Disturbance". The album was digitally remastered and re-released in 2011.

== Track listing ==
No.	Title	Writer(s)	Length
1.	"Fragile"	Torsten Kinsella, Neils Kinsella	4:34
2.	"All Is Violent, All Is Bright"	T. Kinsella, N. Kinsella, Lloyd Hanney, Thomas Kinsella	4:14
3.	"Forever Lost"	T. Kinsella, N. Kinsella, Pat O'Donnell	6:22
4.	"Fireflies and Empty Skies"	T. Kinsella, N. Kinsella, L. Hanney	3:55
5.	"A Deafening Distance"	T. Kinsella, N. Kinsella, L. Hanney	3:49
6.	"Infinite Horizons"	T. Kinsella, N. Kinsella	2:28
7.	"Suicide by Star"	T. Kinsella, N. Kinsella, L. Hanney	4:38
8.	"Remembrance Day" (A new version of "Remembrance" from The End of the Beginning)	T. Kinsella, N. Kinsella, Thomas Kinsella	4:16
9.	"Dust and Echoes"	T. Kinsella, N. Kinsella, L. Hanney	4:13
10.	"When Everything Dies" "Halo of Flies" (hidden track)	T. Kinsella, N. Kinsella, L. Hanney; L. Hanney	6:06; 2:52
11.	"Disturbance" (on digital version)	T. Kinsella, N. Kinsella	3:43
Total length:			47:09

== Personnel ==
God Is an Astronaut

- Torsten Kinsella - guitars, keyboards, vocals, programming
- Niels Kinsella - bass guitar, guitars, keyboards
- Lloyd Hanney - drums, loops, synths

Production

- Torsten Kinsella – mixer
- Niels Kinsella – artwork
- Tim Young – remastering (2011 reissue)
