= Stellar (musician) =

Indian-American musical artist

- Born: Siddhant Banerjee; August 16, 2000 (age 26); Lowell, Massachusetts, U.S.
- Origin: Los Angeles, California, U.S.
- Genres: Pop; hip hop
- Occupations: Singer; songwriter; record producer
- Years active: 2019–present
- Labels: Arista; Greater Boston

Siddhant Banerjee (born August 16, 2000), known by his stage name Stellar, is an American singer, songwriter, and producer from Lowell, Massachusetts, based in Los Angeles. His career launched on August 6, 2019, with the release of his debut mixtape "Bipolar." On May 6, 2020, Stellar released the single "Ashes", which achieved Platinum RIAA certification and helped him sign a record deal with Arista Records. His single "Daredevil" is inspired by an ex-girlfriend.

== Discography ==
=== Mixtapes ===
Year	Album	Title
2019	Bipolar	Last Summer
2019	Bipolar	Little Things
2019	Bipolar	Yesterday
2019	Bipolar	Stylin'
2019	Bipolar	Attached
2019	Bipolar	Just Come With Me
2019	Bipolar	3am Thoughts
2019	Bipolar	August 6
2019	Bipolar	Mist
2019	Bipolar	Playing With Strings
2019	Bipolar	Memories
2019	Bipolar	Set It Free
2019	Bipolar	Buttercup
2019	Bipolar	Slow Down

=== Singles ===
Year	Title
2020	Ashes
2020	Blur
2021	El Dorado
2021	Ashes (Martin Jensen Remix)
2021	Mistake
2021	Daredevil
2021	Bad Dream
2022	Masquerade
2022	Faith In Me (with Sunday Scaries)
2022	Moving On (with RudyWade)
2022	I'm Still Young
2022	Stranger
Note: Most songs from this point onward currently lack citations.
2023	Stuck On You
2023	Cold Outside
2023	Grave
2023	Smoking Gun
2023	More Than Friends
2023	Golden Years
2023	Joyride
2023	Naughty Girls
2024	No Angels
2024	Chains
2024	Like It Like That (with MOONLGHT)
2024	Red Flags
2024	California Caffeine
2024	Novocaine
2024	Mean It
2024	Dangerous Game
2024	Temptress
2024	Secret
2024	Darts
2025	Save Me
2025	VHS
2025	Jenna Ortega
2025	Upside Down
2025	90210
2025	OVERDRIVE
2025	Parasite
2026	Lie 2 Me
2026	Bad 4 Me
2026	Love Me No More
2026	Love is a Game
2026	Bad News ft. Black Gryph0n & Baasik
2026	Hell of a Time

=== EPs ===
Year	Album	Title
2021	The Treasha	Catalyst
2021	The Treasha	Ricochet
2021	The Treasha	Wants Me
2021	The Treasha	Till Tomorrow
2026	Love Letter	Love Me No More
2026	Love Letter	Love is a Game
