= ASC (musician) =

- Also known as: Comit, Intex Systems, Mindspan
- Born: James Clements
- Origin: England
- Genres: Electronic, drum and bass, jungle, ambient
- Years active: 1999–present
- Labels: Auxiliary,Spatial, Horo, Samurai Music, Veil, Curvature, Waveforms, Over/Shadow, Silent Season, Semantica, ARTS
- Website: theasc.blogspot.com

James Clements, better known as ASC, is a British electronic music producer and film and videogame music composer who currently resides in Del Mar, California. He has been releasing music under the alias ASC since 1999, and originally gained popularity as a drum and bass producer. In the late 2000s, he was one of the key artists in the emergence of the autonomic genre, along with artists such as dBridge and Instra:Mental. He is now largely releasing ambient jungle drum and bass on his own label Spatial, alongside the likes of Aural Imbalance.

He was married to dubstep producer, Vaccine, who died in 2023 at the age of 43.

== Discography ==
=== Albums ===
- Environments (2003)
- Open Spaces (2004)
- Remixes & Collaborations (2006)
- Heights of Perception (2009)
- The Astral Traveler (2009)
- Nothing Is Certain (2010)
- The Light That Burns Twice as Bright (2011)
- Decayed Society (2012, with Sam KDC)
- Out of Sync (2012)
- Time Heals All (2013)
- Truth Be Told (2014)
- Fervent Dream (2015)
- Imagine the Future (2015)
- No Stars Without Darkness (2016)
- Trans-Neptunian Objects (2017)
- Astral Projection (2018)
- Trans-Neptunian Objects II (2018)
- The Waves (2019)
- Rainfall (2019)
- 1138 (2019)
- Realm of the Infinite (2019)
- Realm of the Void (2019)
- The Waves (2019)
- The Tonal Cycles (2019)
- A Restless Mind (2020, with Sam KDC)
- Isolated Systems (2020)
- Dimensional Space (2020, with Inhmost)
- The Moons of Saturn (2021, with Inhmost)
- Defiance (2021)
- Colours of Absence (2022)
- Hiding in Plain Sight (2023)
- The Depths of Space (2023)
- Original Soundtrack (2024)
- Surfacing (2024, with Sam KDC)
- Loss (2024)
- Reflections (2024)
- Duality (2024, with Aural Imbalance)
- Next Time You Fall (2025)
- Vanishing Point (2025)
- Tales of Introspection (2025)
