= Embers (God Is an Astronaut album) =

Studio album by God Is an Astronaut
- Released: 6 September 2024
- Genres: Post-rock; indie rock; ambient
- Length: 57:38
- Label: Napalm

God Is an Astronaut chronology
| Somnia (2022) | Embers (2024) |

Singles from Embers
- 1. "Falling Leaves" Released: 12 June 2024

Embers is the 11th album by Irish post-rock band God Is an Astronaut, released 6 September 2024.

== Production ==
The album featured string player Jo Quail and multi-instrumentalist Dara O’Brien, who played instruments such as a sitar, zither, and tanpura. The album sleeve was designed by David Rooney. The album was started in honour to Neils and Torsten's father, Thomas Kinsella, who had managed the band, with work on Falling Leaves and Odyssey started days after his sudden death in November 2023.

One single, Falling Leaves, was released.

== Reception ==
Professional ratings
Review scores
| Source | Rating |
|---|---|
| Blabbermouth | 7/10 stars |
| Noizze | 9/10 stars |
| CrypticRock | 5/5 stars |
| Hot Press | 8/10 stars |

The album was generally positively received. Edwin McFee, writing for Hot Press, called the album "powerful and poignant", calling the ten minute long title track a standout. Gary Trueman of Devolution Magazine noted the album's "ability to weave [a] tapestry" of "stories, journeys and emotions", drawing particular praise to the tracks Embers, Fallen Leaves, Realms, and Prism.

For the Sleeping Shaman, Josh Schneider noted the presence of "sitar, cello, zither, shamanic drums, bowed psaltery, chimes and tanpura" on the track Odyssey, which he wrote "expand[ed] the sonic landscape". Brett Olsen of Lots of Muzik described the band as having "outdone themselves", calling "every track" a "carefully crafted piece", and the album as a "cohesive, engaging journey". Dom Lawson, writing for Blabbermouth, stated that while the album was "not perfect", it was nonetheless a "fine record", and called its "desire to look beyond the mundane" as being "undeniable".

== Track listing ==
All tracks are written by Lloyd Hanney, Niels Kinsella, Torsten Kinsella.

The Guitar and Other Machines
| No. | Title | Length |
|---|---|---|
| 1. | "Apparition" | 5:27 |
| 2. | "Falling Leaves" | 7:57 |
| 3. | "Odyssey" | 7:39 |
| 4. | "Heart of Roots" | 5:38 |
| 5. | "Embers" | 9:59 |
| 6. | "Realms" | 4:42 |
| 7. | "Oscillation" | 5:34 |
| 8. | "Prism" | 4:35 |
| 9. | "Hourglass" | 6:07 |
| Total length: | | 57:38 |

== Charts ==
Chart performance for Embers
| Chart (2024) | Peak position |
|---|---|
| UK Rock & Metal Albums (Official Charts) | 30 |
| UK Album Downloads (Official Charts) | 57 |
| UK Independent Album Breakers (Official Charts) | 15 |
