= Epitaph (God Is an Astronaut album) =

Studio album by God is an Astronaut
- Released: April 27, 2018
- Genre: Post-rock
- Length: 44:34
- Label: Napalm
- Producer: God Is An Astronaut.

God is an Astronaut chronology
Helios / Erebus (2015)	Epitaph (2018)	Ghost Tapes #10 (2021)

Epitaph is the eighth studio album by Irish post-rock band God Is An Astronaut. It was released through Napalm Records on April 27, 2018. It is the final album to feature keyboardist Jamie Dean, who left the band in 2017 to pursue his own music and projects.

== Themes ==
Epitaph's theme is death, inspired by the passing of the 7-year-old cousin of Torsten and Niels Kinsella. Oisín, the record's final track, was written on the day they received the news of the child's death.

== Track listing ==
No.	Title	Length
1.	"Epitaph"	7:53
2.	"Mortal Coil"	5:32
3.	"Winter Dusk/Awakening"	6:42
4.	"Seance Room"	7:40
5.	"Komorebi"	5:31
6.	"Medea"	6:58
7.	"Oisín"	4:18
Total length:		44:34

== Reception ==
Professional ratings
Review scores
Source	Rating
Hardwired	4/5 stars
Sputnikmusic	3.8/5
Exclaim!	7/10 stars

Upon release the album received generally positive reviews among critics. Jadranka Balaš of Hardwired Magazine wrote that Epitaph, "is a heavy, dark record, filled with sorrow and melancholy, at least in major parts. One of those who leaves you drained, but somehow with ease because you’ve released all those feelings out of you." Max Morin of Exclaim! stated in his review that the band have, "... yet to top All Is Violent, All Is Bright, but Epitaph is the closest they've come yet.".

== Personnel ==
God Is An Astronaut

- Torsten Kinsella - guitars, keyboards, vocals, programming
- Niels Kinsella - bass
- Lloyd Hanney - drums

Production

- God Is An Astronaut - Production and mixing
- Xenon Field - Post Production and programming
- Tim Young - Mastering
- Fursy Teyssier - Artwork

Additional musicians

- Jimmy Scanlon - Additional Guitar on all songs except "Oisín"
- Jamie Dean - Additional Piano/Keys on "Epitaph", "Mortal Coil", and "Winter Dusk/Awakening"
- Brian Harris - Additional Guitar on "Mortal Coil"
