= Origins (God Is an Astronaut album) =

Studio album by God Is an Astronaut
- Released: September 16, 2013
- Genre: Post-rock
- Length: 53:05
- Label: Rocket Girl

God Is an Astronaut chronology
Age of the Fifth Sun (2010)	Origins (2013)	Helios|Erebus (2015)

Origins is the sixth studio album by Irish post-rock band God Is an Astronaut. It was released on September 16, 2013 in the UK, and in the US a day later.

== Reception ==
Professional ratings
Aggregate scores
Source	Rating
Metacritic	78/100
Review scores
Source	Rating
Drowned in Sound	8/10
The Line of Best Fit	7.5/10
PopMatters	8/10 stars
Sputnikmusic	2.8/5

Origins received positive reviews from critics. On Metacritic, the album holds a score of 78/100 based on 4 reviews, indicating "generally favorable reviews".

== Track listing ==
No.	Title	Length
1.	"The Last March"	4:44
2.	"Calistoga"	4:30
3.	"Reverse World"	5:10
4.	"Transmissions"	4:03
5.	"Weightless"	4:12
6.	"Exit Dream"	3:31
7.	"Signal Rays"	4:07
8.	"Autumn Song"	3:47
9.	"Spiral Code"	4:13
10.	"Strange Steps"	4:55
11.	"Red Moon Lagoon"	4:45
12.	"Light Years from Home"	5:08
