= Ashe (name) =

Ashe is a surname in Ireland. Most are of Norman origin and were originally known as d'Essecourt (their name has been Gaelicised as Ághas). A minority of the Ó Luaithre from County Galway also Anglicised their name as Ashe. The family crest is a silver shield with two black chevronels.

Notable people with the surname include:

- Adam Ashe (born 1993), Scottish rugby union coach and
- Andrew Ashe (c. 1758–1838), Irish flautist
- Aran Ashe, British erotic writer
- Arthur Ashe (1943–1993), American tennis player and social activist
- Bowman Foster Ashe (1885–1952), American academic administrator
- Brian Ashe (born 1963), American politician
- Corey Ashe (born 1986), American soccer player
- Daniel M. Ashe, former Director of the United States Fish and Wildlife Service
- Danni Ashe (born 1968), American model and businesswoman
- Douglas Ashe, pseudonym used by John Franklin Bardin (1916–1981)
- Edward Ashe (disambiguation)
- Geoffrey Ashe (1923–2022), British writer on Arthurian subjects
- George Ash (Australian politician) (1859–1897), newspaper editor, lawyer and parliamentarian in colonial South Australia
- George Ashe (Canadian politician) (1932–2014)
- George T. Ashe (1905–1975), American politician
- John Ashe (disambiguation)
- Sir Joseph Ashe, 1st Baronet (1618–1686), English MP for Downton
- Joseph Ashe (English politician) (c. 1684–1725), English MP for Chippenham
- Joseph Ashe (Irish politician) (1717–c. 1760), Irish MP for Trim
- Karen Ashe, American research scientist
- Kathy Ashe (born 1946), American politician
- Martin Ashe (born 1953), Irish-Australian Catholic bishop
- Paula D. Ashe, American author
- Robert Hoadley Ashe (1751–1826), English divine
- Robert Ashe (civil servant) (1872–1911), Collector and District Magistrate in India, assassinated in 1911
- Samuel Ashe (disambiguation)
- Simeon Ashe (died 1662), English nonconformist clergyman
- Saint-George Ashe (1871–1922), British rower
- St George Ashe (1658–1718), Church of Ireland cleric
- Tala Ash (born 1984), Iranian-American actress
- Thomas Ashe (disambiguation)
- Tim Ashe (born 1976), American politician
- Trevor Ashe (1770–1836), Irish writer, newspaper editor, publisher, museum director, entrepreneur, confidence trickster and blackmailer
- Vic Ash (1930–2014), English jazz saxophonist and clarinetist
- Victor Ashe (born 1945), American former mayor and ambassador
- Victor Ash (artist) (born 1968), French graffiti artist
- William Ashe (disambiguation)
