= Edmund Plowden =

Member of the Parliament of England

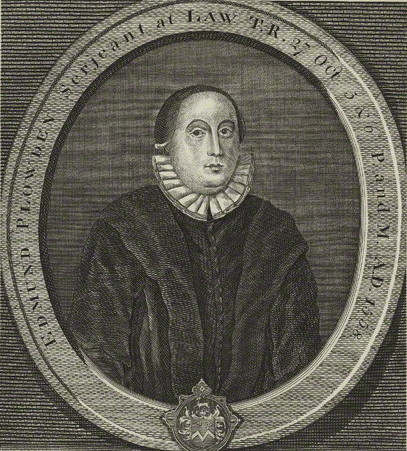

Member of the English Parliament for Wallingford
- In office 1553

Member of the English Parliament for Reading
- In office 1554

Member of the English Parliament for Wootton Bassett
- In office 1555

Personal details
- Born: 1519/20 Plowden Hall, Lydbury North, Shropshire
- Died: 6 February 1585 London
- Resting place: Temple Church
- Spouse: Catherine Sheldon
- Children: 5
- Occupation: lawyer, legal scholar and theorist

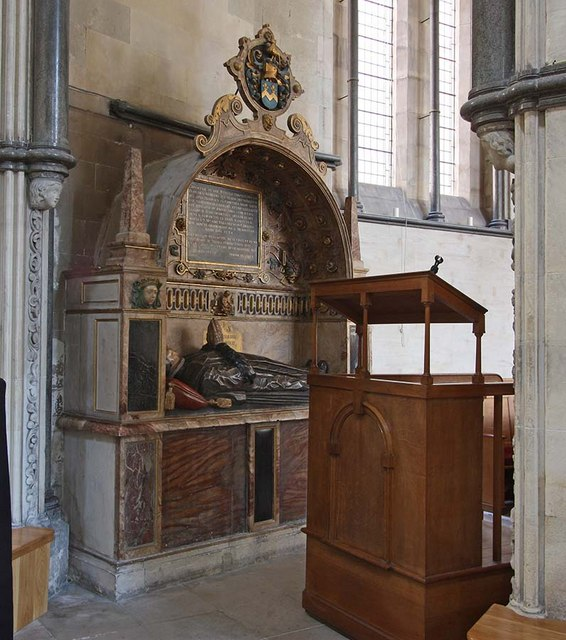
Monument of Edmund Plowden, Temple Church, London

Edmund Plowden (1519/20 – 6 February 1585) was an English lawyer, legal scholar and theorist during the late Tudor period.

== Early life ==
Plowden was born at Plowden Hall, Lydbury North, Shropshire. He was the son of Humphrey Plowden (1490–1557), by his wife, Elizabeth Sturry (died 1559), widow of William Wollascot, and daughter of John Sturry, Esq., of Rossall, Shropshire. Educated at the University of Cambridge, he did not take a degree, and proceeded to the Middle Temple in 1538 to study law. Subsequent to studies at Oxford, he qualified as a surgeon and physician in 1552.

Upon the accession of the Catholic Queen Mary, Plowden was appointed one of the Council of the Marches (of Wales). In 1553, he was elected Member of Parliament for Wallingford (then in Berkshire now in Oxfordshire), followed, in the next two years, by the same office for both Reading, Berkshire and then Wootton Bassett, Wiltshire. He lived mostly at Shiplake Court in Oxfordshire and Wokefield Park in Berkshire. The unusual breadth of his religious views were shown early in his career when he, however, withdrew from the House, on 12 January 1555, because he disapproved of the proceedings there.

== Recusant under Elizabeth ==
His Roman Catholicism prevented Plowden from further promotion under Queen Elizabeth I, and he was increasingly regarded with suspicion by members of the Privy Council. At the beginning of the reign he undertook the management of the Shropshire lands of Sir Francis Englefield, an important Catholic courtier under Mary who went into exile. In 1567 Plowden, with Edward Saunders, became joint guardian of Englefield's nephew and heir, also Francis, through influence with the Earl of Pembroke.

At one time, it is said, the queen wished to elevate Plowden to the Lord Chancellorship. Plowden declined, deprecating religious persecution. The occasion, according to the History of Parliament, could only have been the vacancy of 1578. Plowden continued in the Queen's employ in his capacity as a lawyer.

He sought to assist those of his faith, including his defence of Robert Horne, Bishop of Winchester. In 1565 he defended Edmund Bonner, with William Lovelace and Christopher Wray.

== Death ==
Plowden died on 6 February 1585 in London and was buried in the Temple Church in London, where survives his monument and recumbent effigy.

== "The case is altered" ==
"The case is altered" was a proverbial expression in the 17th century, as well as the title of a 1609 play by Ben Jonson. As "the case is alter'd, quoth Plowden", it is attached to anecdotes. In one of them, while defending a gentleman charged with hearing Mass, Plowden worked out that the service had been performed by a layman for the sole purpose of informing against those present, and exclaimed, "The case is altered; no priest, no Mass", and thus secured an acquittal.

== Works ==
Plowden is noted today for his legal scholarship and theory, in his written works:

- Les comentaries ou les reportes de Edmunde Plowden (1571) in law French. The Commentaries were abridged by Thomas Ashe (around 1597), and indexed by William Fleetwood. They contained a report by Plowden on the legal status of the Duchy of Lancaster in relation to The Crown, and its settlement by Henry IV of England. Plowden and Anthony Browne had, two decades earlier, formulated the theory of the King's Two Bodies to explain political arrangements; Ernst Kantorowicz has argued that this doctrine came to the fore in the 1560s, in debates over the status of the Duchy.
- Quares del Monsieur Plowden.

A Treatise on Succession attempted to prove that Mary, Queen of Scots, was not debarred from the English throne under Henry VIII's will.

== Family ==
Plowden married Catherine Sheldon of Beoley, daughter of the Worcestershire Member of Parliament William Sheldon; they had three sons and two daughters (Anne and Mary). Anne was the wife of Francis Perkins of Ufton, Berkshire, and Mary was the wife of Richard White of Hutton, Essex. Mary was also the mother of Thomas White.

Plowden's sister Margaret inherited the Rossall estates and married Richard Sandford of Eglington. Plowden helped John Cole, husband of Alice Sandford, daughter of Richard, to gain the seat of Bishop's Castle in 1584.
