= North American Manx Museum =

Museum of Manx culture in Platteville, Wisconsin, USA

- Established: 2012
- Location: Platteville, Wisconsin, United States
- Coordinates: 42°44′04″N 90°29′06″W
- Public transit access: Black Orange Purple; Platteville Public Transportation
- Website: Official website

The North American Manx Museum in Platteville, Wisconsin, at University of Wisconsin–Platteville, in the United States was opened in 2012. It relates to the Isle of Man, located between Ireland and Britain, and to the heritage of Manx immigrants who came to the United States.

== See also ==
- Manx Museum, in Douglas, Isle of Man
