= Manx Museum =

- Thie Tashtee Vannin
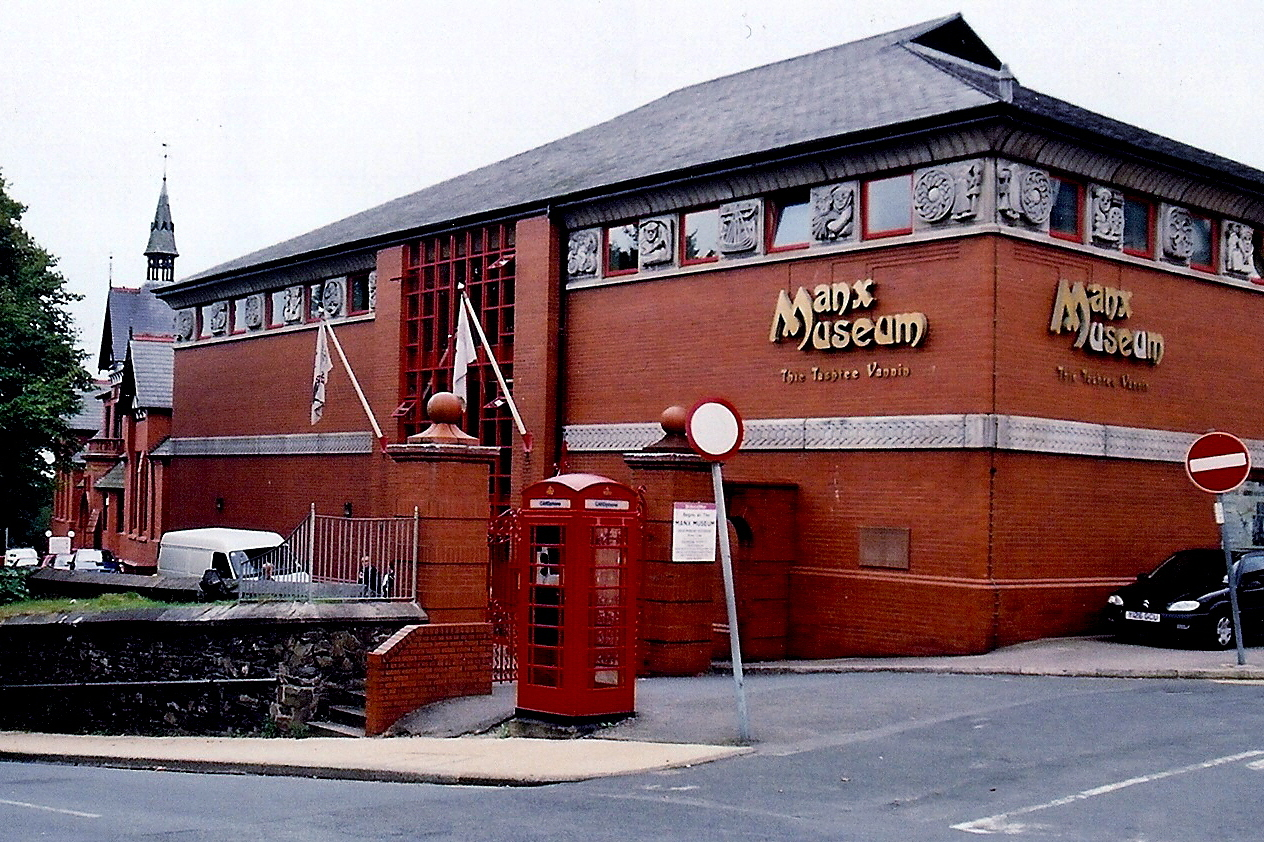
- The Manx Museum building in Douglas

- Location of Manx Museum on the Isle of Man
- Established: 2 November 1922; 103 years ago
- Location: Kingswood Grove, Douglas, Isle of Man
- Coordinates: 54°09′16″N 4°28′55″W
- Type: National Museum

The Manx Museum (Manx: Thie Tashtee Vannin) in Douglas, Isle of Man is the national museum of the Isle of Man. It is run by Manx National Heritage. The museum covers 10,000 years the history of the Isle of Man from the Stone Age to the modern era.

The museum serves as headquarters of Manx National Heritage. The museum bears no relation to the institution with the same name founded by Trevor Ashe in 1825.

== History ==
The Museum and Ancient Monuments Act 1886 led to the creation of a national museum for the Isle of Man with the aim of preserving the island's cultural and historical heritage. Although there had previously been an institution on the Isle of Man named the Manx Museum, founded by entrepreneur, author, and publisher Trevor Ashe in 1825, it has no relation to the Manx Museum run by Manx National Heritage.

The Manx Museum is partially housed in the original Noble's Hospital building. The site on Crellin's Hill in Douglas was bequeathed by Rebecca Noble, the wife of philanthropist and businessman Henry Bloom Noble in 1885. Rebecca Noble laid the foundation stone but did not live to see the building officially opened.

After the opening of the new Noble's Hospital on Westmoreland Road in 1912, the building lay empty for nearly a decade until the building was handed over to the trustees for the Manx Museum. The Manx Museum opened on 2 November 1922 with Philip Moore Callow Kermode as its director.

The museum was expanded and was significantly remodelled between 1986–89 and a large extension included a lecture and film theatre, and an art gallery. The museum was officially reopened by Queen Elizabeth II, Lord of Mann in 1989.

== Exhibitions ==
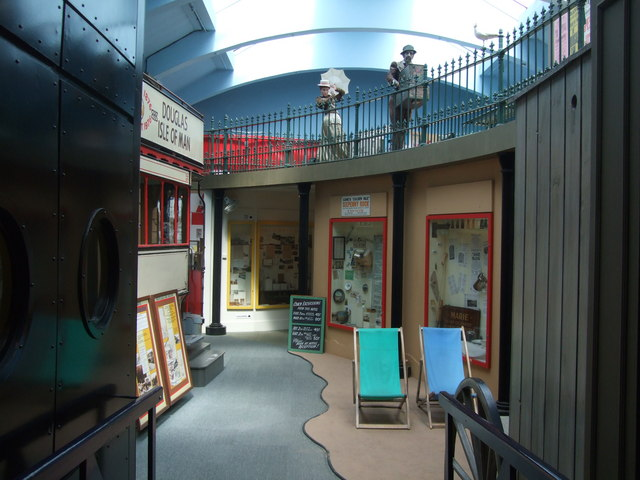
Exhibition depicting tourism on the Isle of Man

Apart from a number of permanent exhibitions ranging from the archaeological history of the Isle of Man to the natural history collection, several temporary themed exhibitions are shown each year. Every summer an exhibition covering the Isle of Man Tourist Trophy races and motorcycle racing is shown.

Other recent exhibitions have included This Terrible Ordeal which focused on the experiences of the Manx people in World War I, and the artwork of British artist William Hoggatt. Events are also held at the Museum, such as the 2008 launch of the book Practical Manx by Jennifer Kewley Draskau.

== Visitors ==
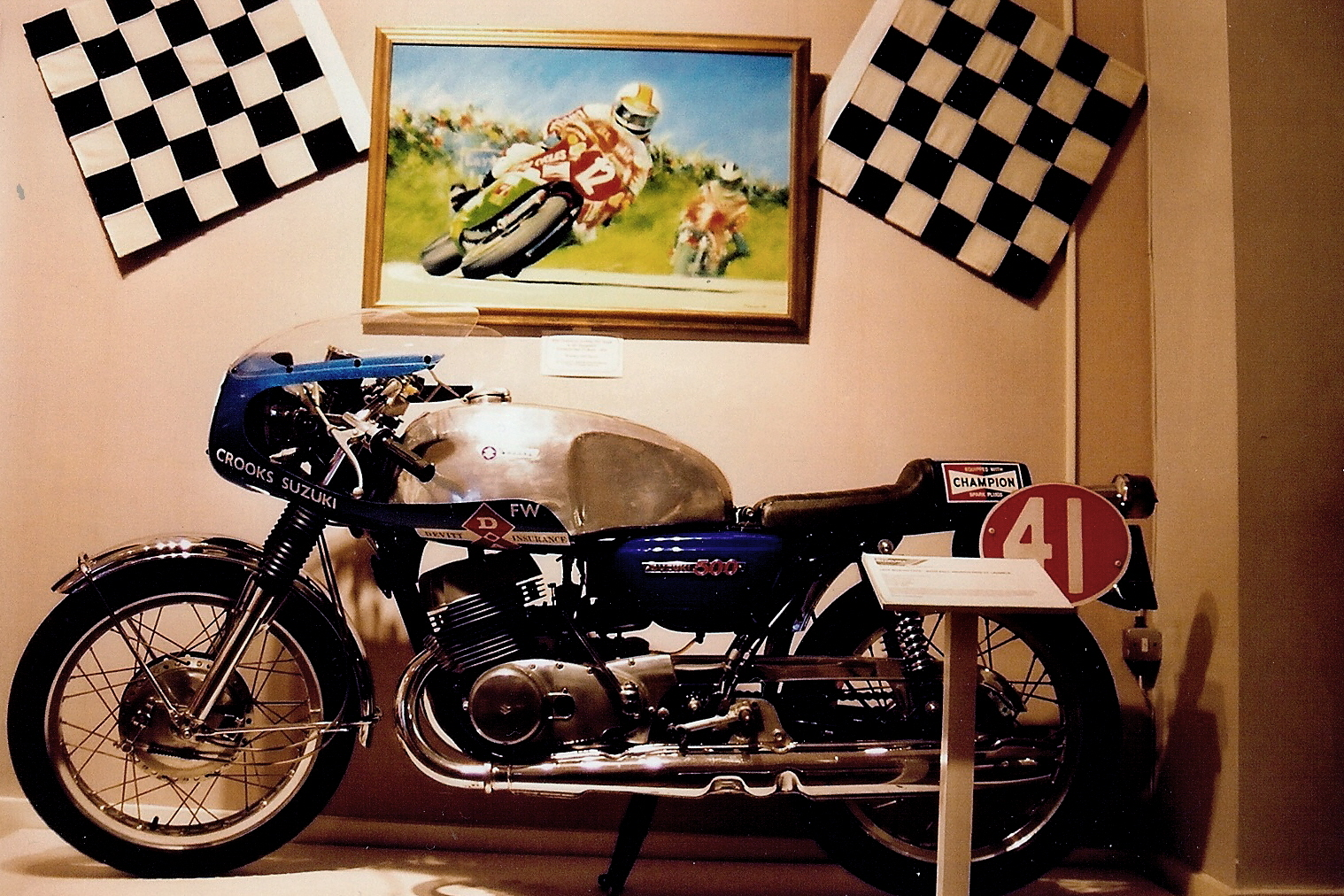
1970 Suzuki T500 race-prepared by Eddie Crooks, winning machine in the 1970 500 cc Production Class TT race ridden by Frank Whiteway, on display at the Manx Museum

In 2018 Manx National Heritage stated that there were 100,000 visitors each year on average to the Manx Museum. This figure was disputed by the Isle of Man Newspapers, following a freedom of information request found the recorded numbers to be much less than estimated.

The FoI response revealed that in 2015, MNH counted 63,953 visitors into the museum, in 2016 this was 68,602 and in 2017 the number was 72,661, while the numbers represent an increase of 8,708 visitors over three years, this is still 27,339 shy of the number MNH claimed.

The museum stated that due to remodelling of one of the museum's entrances, "it has become clear that the methodology we use to estimate visitors and users needs to be updated."

== Facilities ==
The museum has limited parking, a shop, a café and is open daily. The National Art Gallery and the Manx National Library and Archives are also located on the site.

== See also ==
- North American Manx Museum in Wisconsin, United States
- Castle Rushen
- House of Manannan
