= Water engine =

Type of engine

Animation, based on Lexikon der gesamten Technik (1904)

The water engine is a positive-displacement engine, often closely resembling a steam engine with similar pistons and valves, that is driven by water pressure. The supply of water is derived from a natural head of water, the water mains, or a specialised high-pressure water supply such as that once provided by the London Hydraulic Power Company. Water mains in the 19th century often operated at pressures of 30 to 40 psi (210 to 280 kPa), while hydraulic power companies supplied higher pressure water at anything up to 800 psi (5,500 kPa).

The term water motor (German: Wassermotor) was more commonly applied to small Pelton wheel type turbines driven from a mains water tap (e.g. Whitney Water Motor), and mainly used for light loads, for example sewing machines.

In the nineteenth century, the terms hydraulic motor and hydraulic engine often implied reference to any motor driven by liquid pressure, including water motors and water engines used in hydropower, but today mentions of hydraulic motors, unless otherwise specified, usually refer more specifically to those that run on hydraulic fluid in the closed hydraulic circuits of hydraulic machinery.

== Description ==
Because water is virtually incompressible, the valve gear of water engines is more complicated than that used in steam engines, and some water engines even had a small secondary engine solely to power the operation of their valves. Closing a valve too quickly can cause very large pressures to result, and pipework to explode (a phenomenon similar to water hammer), and in addition to valves designed to close slowly, many water engines used air chambers to provide some absorption of force by compressing the air in them.

== History ==
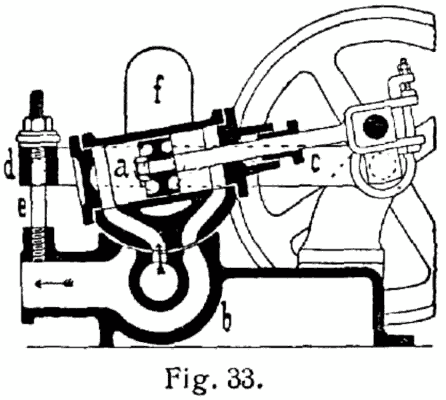
Detailed cross-section from Lexikon der gesamten Technik (1904)

It is unclear when or where water engines were invented, but it is possible that they were first used in the mines in central Germany; certainly such a device was described by Robert Fludd after he had visited Germany around 1600.

== Applications ==
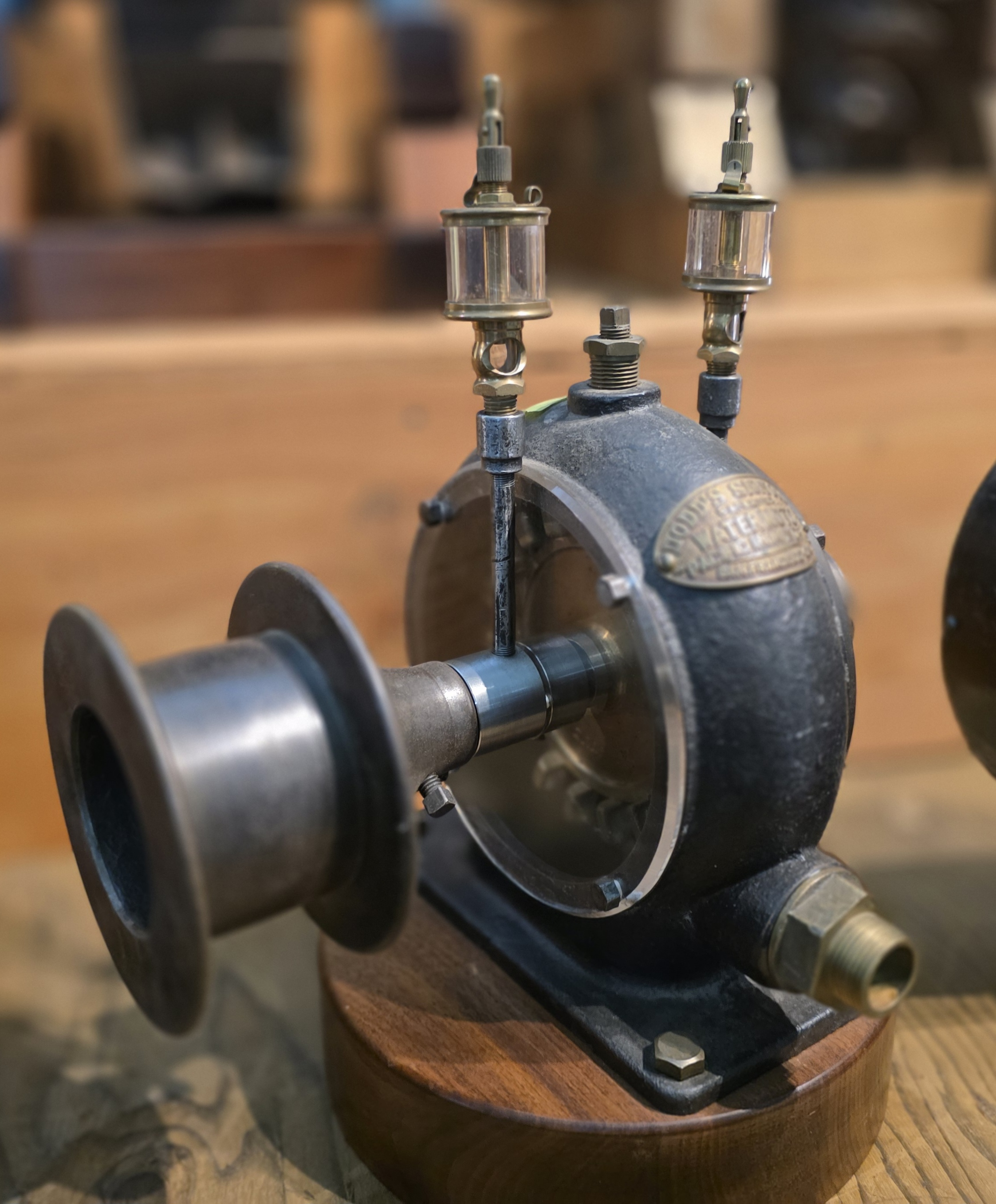
Dodd's Sigmoidal Patented Water Motor

During the 19th century water engines were extensively used in the city of London, operating on high-pressure water supplied by the London Hydraulic Power Company via its extensive network of pipes. Even when practical electric motors entered use, water engines remained popular for some years as they possessed several advantages: they were quiet, reliable, cheap to run, compact, safe, and could be relied on to operate reliably in damp or waterlogged conditions unsuited to electrical apparatus, such as powering water pumps in mines, where their ability to continue operating even while completely submerged was a major advantage.

Other applications included usage by the railway companies, where they powered railway turntables, cranes, hoists, etc., revolving stages at the London Palladium and Coliseum Theatre, and powering pipe organs.

== Water-column engines ==
The largest possible design of a water engine is the directly acting water-column engine or water column machine (German: Wassersäulenmaschine). Such devices had been in use for pumping purposes in different mining areas since the middle of the eighteenth century and one was used, for example, by Georg Friedrich von Reichenbach in 1810 to pump brine from Berchtesgaden to Reichenhall.

Similar to the function of a hydraulic ram the water being admitted is transported by another medium. The differently-sized pistons of the water-column engine run on a single axle; its control loosely resembles that of a steam engine. Water-column engines were used in the transportation of brine, pumping it from one place to another.

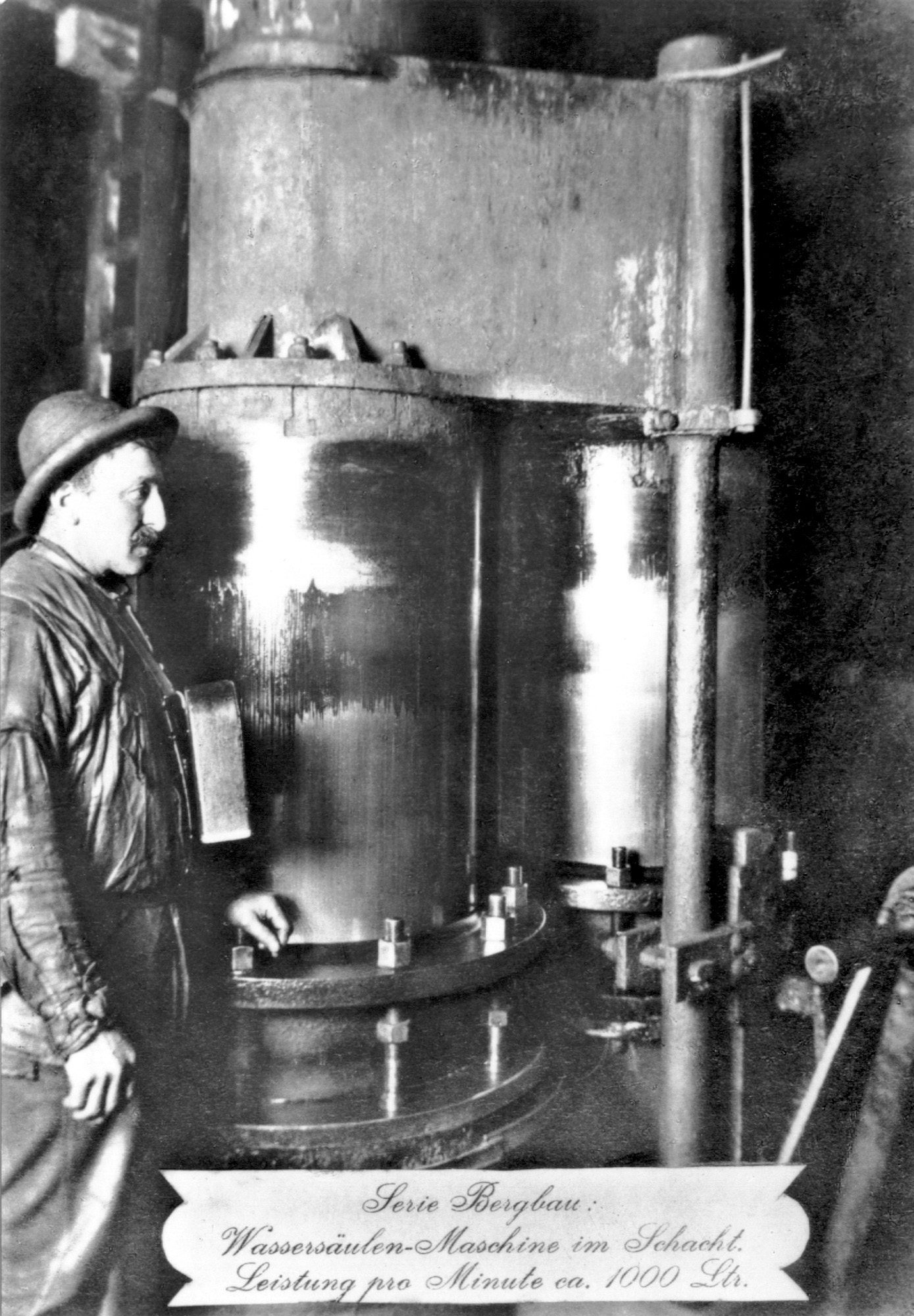
Freiberg water-column engine (1900)

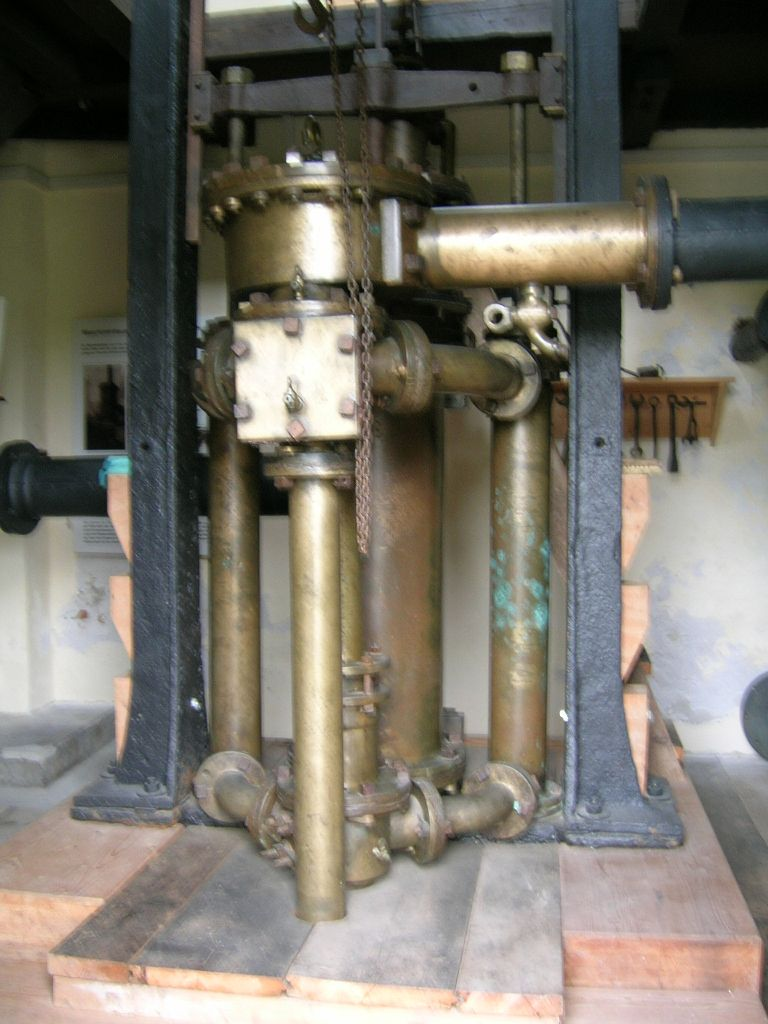
Reichenbach water-column engine in the Klaushäusl Museum

== Water engines in washing machines ==
The water engine was also successfully used in washing machines, e. g. from 1914 by the firm of Miele. These washing machines, which were very common especially in rural areas until the 1960s, comprised a wooden tub with a rotating cross built into the cover. This 'star handle' was rotated in regular, to and fro, movements by two pistons which were connected to the water mains. The washing effect was achieved by the constant movement of the washing in the washtub filled with soap suds (Lauge) and/or water.

The large amount of water used was less important because plenty of used water was often available and was very cheap. In addition, in thrifty rural households the water used to drive it was often used for other purposes as well.

A prerequisite for the correct function of the water engine was sufficient pressure in the water pipes. In times of high water consumption (before or after work) the water pressure was often insufficient. In hard winters, in which the water pipes often froze, the water engine could not be used. For these reasons the washing machines still had a device that enable them to be rotated by 'muscle power'.

With the invention of the modern washing machine these washtubs with their water engines disappeared from the market.
