= Robert Ashe =

Robert Ashe may refer to:

- Robert Hoadley Ashe (1751–1826), English divine
- Robert Ashe (civil servant) (1872–1911), Collector and District Magistrate in India, assassinated in 1911

== See also ==
- Robert Ash (disambiguation)
