= Thomas Ashe (disambiguation) =

Thomas Ashe (1885–1917) was a member of the Gaelic League.

Thomas Ashe may also refer to:

- Thomas Ashe (legal writer) (c. 1556–1618), English legal writer
- Thomas Ashe (poet) (1836–1889), English poet
- Thomas Ashe (writer) (1770–1835), Irish novelist
- Thomas Samuel Ashe (1812–1887), U.S. and Confederate congressman and judge
- Thomas Ashe (footballer) (1920–1997), Scottish footballer
- Tom Ashe (1927–2016), Irish Gaelic footballer
- Trevor Ashe (1770–1836), also known as Thomas Ashe, Irish writer, newspaper editor, publisher, museum director, entrepreneur, confidence trickster and blackmailer
