= Stuart Turner (company) =

British engineering company specialising in models

Stuart Turner Ltd is a British engineering company, based in Henley-on-Thames, Oxfordshire, England, founded by engineer Sidney Marmaduke Stuart Turner in 1906.

== History of the company ==
=== Before World War I ===
Stuart Turner Ltd was incorporated in 1906 and started to produce model steam engines, gas engines for domestic electricity, lathes, etc. Stuart Turner went on to produce further model steam designs, and in 1906 there were nine models in the range. By 1907 more space was needed so premises were rented at Market Place in the centre of Henley-On-Thames, where the company remained for many years.

The 2-stroke engine with crankcase compression had been invented by Joseph Day in the mid-1890s. This made possible lightweight engines and new applications. Stuart Turner was exploring making small 2-strokes for motorcycles and generators. In 1911, Stuart Turner developed a complete motorcycle using a Chater-Lea frame and Druid forks. The key part manufactured by Stuart was the 2-port single cylinder 2-stroke engine rated at 2 1/2 HP (71 x 75.5mm bore and stroke giving 299cc). They exhibited it at the 1911 Olympia show (on the stand of R.G. Nye and Co of London).

In 1912 and 1913 they marketed the Stuart Stellar (some early references use 'Stella') motorcycle, this used an in-line two-cylinder water-cooled two-stroke engine complete with shaft drive. Engine capacity is variously quoted as 743 cc and 786 cc. This would be comparable with the Scott motorcycle of the time which had a transverse water cooled two-stroke twin-cylinder engine of 532 cc. However, in-spite of the innovative design, the Stellar was not a success and only 26 examples were built.

The firm secured the contract to make engines for the Dayton motorised bicycle made by Charles Day Manufacturing Co in Shoreditch, London, which was until then purely a bicycle manufacturer. This went on sale in late 1913. The engine has a one-piece cylinder and head with a rear-facing spark plug, and was of 162 cc, rated at 1.5 HP. The bore was 57 mm and the stroke 63.5 mm, and it had a U.H. magneto and Amac (NB not Amal which is a different company) carburettor. Both single-speed and two-speed versions were available, and prices in July 1914 were 20 to 28 guineas according to specification.

Two employees, Alec Plint and W.G. Ayling, rode the Dayton bikes in motorcycle endurance events run by the Auto-Cycle Union (ACU), such as the six days trial. Weighing only 148 lb, these were usually the smallest motorcycles competing. These events included riding between and taking part in various tests, such as hill starts, acceleration and braking, cold starts, and climbing steep rough hills. Total distance for the 1914 event was 674 miles. The Daytons did well given that they were considered rather lacking in power as revealed by this excerpt from the Motor Cycle magazine of July 1914 – 'Ayling (Dayton) footed vigorously, but got his lilliputian engine to the top'. Production of engines for the Dayton was 20 engines per week, but production of the Dayton motorcycle ceased in 1915 due to the first World War.

Dayton Motorcycle with engine made by Stuart Turner

Many of the technical developments during this period appear to be down to Alec Plint, who is named as applicant on five Stuart Turner patents which include sealing crankcases, padding crankcases to improve compression, variable speed gears, and decompression devices. The 1911 patent diagrams show the current 2-stroke to be '2-port', i.e. with the inlet being by non-return valve into the transfer port, with ball races for the main bearings and deflector type piston. The inlet non-return valve is the subject of another Stuart Turner patent in 1911, naming Ernest Masters as co-applicant.

In 1914, the company manufactured a generating plant for the Antarctic explorer Ernest Shackleton's ship, the Endurance. It was used in the ill-fated Imperial Trans-Antarctic Expedition.

=== During World War I ===
During World War I (1914–18), the company produced nuts and bolts, gas valves and a klaxon horn for gas attack warnings. The workforce expanded to over 300 men and 100 women. In 1917, Stuart Turner acquired Broadgates Inn in Market Place, Henley-on-Thames, and has used this as a base ever since.

=== The inter-war years ===
Shortly after the war, Stuart Turner introduced the P3 single-cylinder 2-stroke engine, designed by Alec Plint to drive lighting and pumping plants. This engine was to form the basis of a range of engines used for small power applications, particularly as marine engines and to drive generators, though also to drive equipment and pumps. Castings were produced in Stuart Turner's own foundry. The P4 superseded the P3 in 1928, and in 1930 the marine variant was introduced, and was sold in considerable number for fitment in small yachts and other pleasure boats. In around 1935/1936 the P4 was joined by the larger-bore P5 (268 cc) and twin-cylinder P55 (535 cc). While the P4 was made until the war, the P5 and P55 continued in production for over 30 years. For the marine engines, Stuart Turner produced a reversing gearbox and optional final drive reduction gear; everything else, up to and including the screw propeller, was also available. The many variations of the engines (marine and otherwise) were indicated by suffixes to the engine number; so, for example, a P55ME would be a marine P55 with electric start (Lucas Dynamotor, Siba Dynastart, or separate dynamo and starter).

Between 1932 and 1935, Stuart Turner produced the small (1/2 HP) type N engine, which had an overhung crank. This model seems to have been superseded by the type R 2-stroke engine, which was introduced in 1934 with a full-width crank. The R2 being 84 cc, and the R3 having a larger bore size and hence 123 cc. These small engines were used for general utility, but also the R3M for pleasure boats, hire boats. The R3 was to continue in production until 1977.

The model engineering range was extensive throughout the inter-war years, with much production sold as kits of castings, though some complete engines were also sold. Most of the models were designed to be representative of a class of engine, mainly steam driven, rather than an accurate scale recreation of a specific engine. Internal combustion engines were also available as kits, including the 'lightweight' 2-stroke petrol engine. From 1935, Stuart Turner was also the United Kingdom agent for the American 'Brown Junior' 10 cc engine for which they developed an aluminium (elektron) airscrew. Some of the engines were intended to do a job of work rather than for the entertainment of a model engineer, for example, the 1935 Sandhurst horizontal 2/3 bhp engine, which was described thus: 'This engine will run on gas or petrol and is designed for continuous work such as dynamo, workshop or pump driving. It is supplied only as castings for the amateur to machine up.'. The larger steam engines, for example, the model 6A, are capable of 4 bhp and powering steam launches, thereby blurring the distinction between whether they were model engines, or designed to do a job of work, or both.

Many ancillaries were sold to illustrate the power from the model engines, such as the Avery Multipolar dynamo. In the 1906 catalogue, this dynamo (output of 20 volts, 4 amps at 1200 rpm) was said to have been "designed for use with a Stuart No2 engine". A variety of dynamos were sold over the years allowing them to be matched to the power of the model engine.

Stuart Turner also produced a wide range of boilers to power their steam engines, and sold matched boiler and steam engine as complete 'steam plants'. The most common boilers are the small 501 and 504 copper horizontal types used to drive the model steam engines, but they also produced a range of riveted steel vertical boilers up to 20 inches diameter, and 36 inches high, either with a central flue or with multiple tubes. They also offered brazing services for customers' boilers.

They also produced two complete model steamboats. The 24-inch Henley was produced from 1925, and had a single-cylinder S.T. oscillating steam engine, and the 39-inch Isis was launched the next year with a model 495 boiler and the twin-cylinder Star steam engine. These boats were produced until at least 1936, probably until the war disrupted matters. There was a version of the Henley steamboat powered by a Stuart Turner electric motor; this boat was sold as the 'Magician'. The 4-volt electric motor was also sold separately.

In 1923 the War Office invited Stuart Turner (and other firms) to design a very light air-cooled engine and generator for wireless. It was to be carried on a pack mule. The whole plant must not weigh more than 84 lb, it had to run in any temperature from freezing to 60 °C; it must not be affected by being carried upside down or in any position; it must govern within 5% and there were various other conditions. The result was that five firms produced engines but the Stuart Turner engine was the only one which fulfilled the requirements and passed the tests. This was the W.D. engine, which was a 4-stroke side-valve flat twin, and continued in production for 20 years. Two of these engines were taken on the 1933 Everest expedition to power the wireless sets.

From 1928 until the war, the company issued nine patents (again naming Alec Plint) for milking machines and developed a diaphragm pulsatory milking machine which was marketed by Gascoine of Reading, who later took over the rights. They also developed pumps, and in the 1933 Bond's catalogue a complete Stuart Turner electric motor and centrifugal pump on a baseplate with 180, 800, or 1120 gallons per hour was advertised. This evolved into the current product line of centrifugal pumps.

In 1932, Stuart Turner produced the model K 4-stroke engine, which was a single-cylinder overhead-valve engine designed to power refrigeration units. Only 64 were made, the last in 1938.

In 1934, Stuart Turner introduced the S type steam engine. This was not a model but a fully enclosed single-cylinder commercial power unit of 1 to 1.5 HP designed to drive generators or fans or pumps. It stood 22 inches tall with a 10-inch flywheel and weighed about 120 lb. Preston Services have stated that there were both slide valve and piston valve versions, only 247 were made between 1934 and 1962.

In 1938, Stuart Turner developed a single-cylinder 2-stroke diesel with crankcase compression, the model H. At the time this was the smallest commercial diesel engine in the world. These engines were sold mainly to the RNLI for charging batteries.

=== During World War II ===
The company produced a number of products for the military during World War II (1939–45), including combined boiler, steam engine and generator plants, designed to be used by resistance fighters or troops operating covertly behind enemy lines to power radio transmitters. The first of these modest-sized steam generator plants was called the Firefly, and was based around the Stuart Sirius engine, in 1956 a later one named Mk814 had a bespoke single-cylinder piston valve engine.

Stuart Turner also produced many internal combustion generators with uses such as charging aircraft batteries and providing dummy runway lights on fake airfields. Stuart Turner engines were built into the back of AEC fuel bowser trucks to drive a Zwicky Ltd pump to transfer fuel to aircraft. These P5XC engines were referred to in-house as the Zwicky engines.

=== After World War II ===
Stuart Turner continued to make engines (especially marine engines), pumps, generators, and model kits throughout the post-war years, though several of the pre-war model internal combustion engines did not reappear.

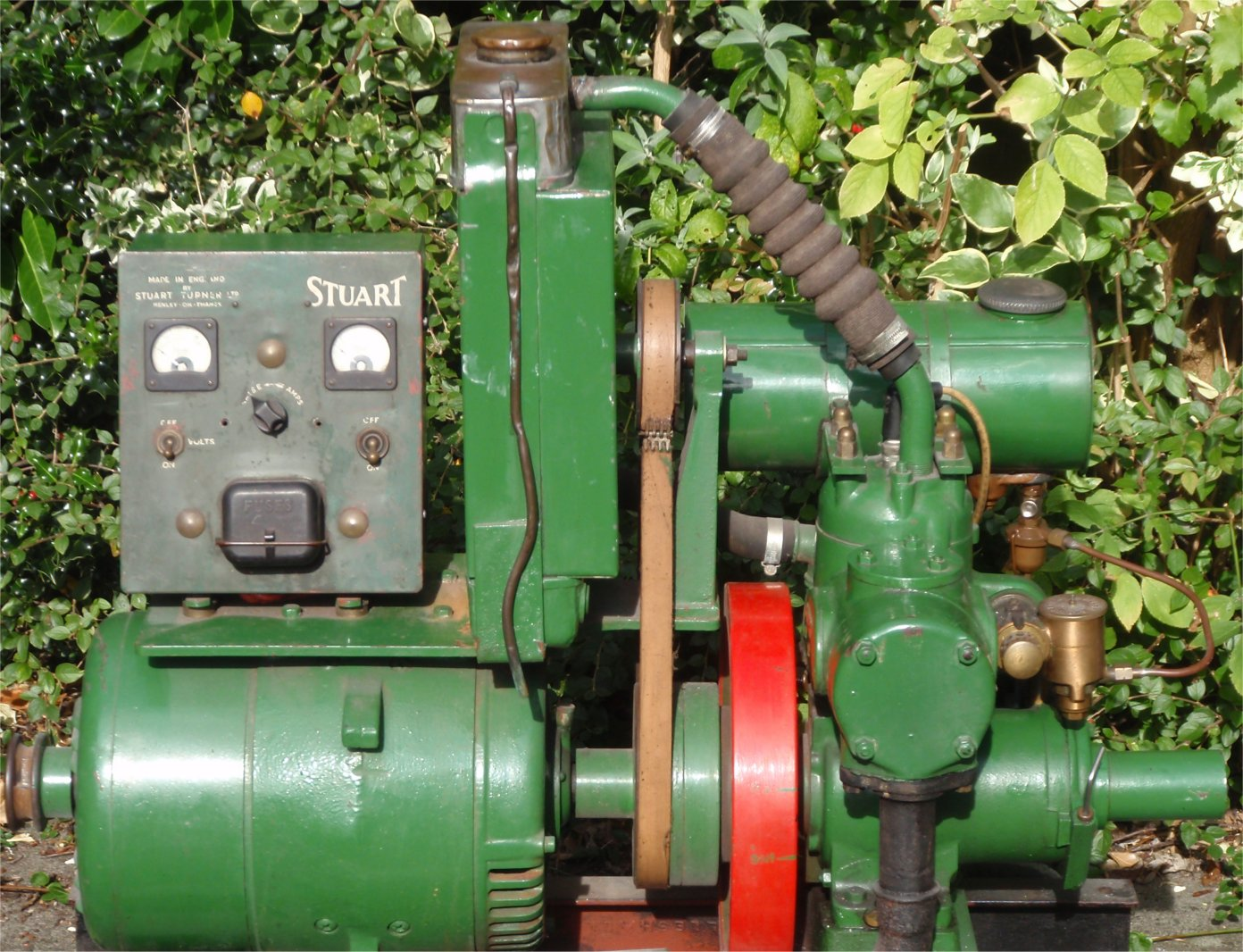
Stuart Turner P5-powered 1.5KVA mains generator, c1960

The pre-war single-cylinder diesel engine was joined by a new twin-cylinder 2-stroke diesel in 1953, the H2/H2M/H2MR. Whereas the single had used crankcase compression to scavenge the cylinder, the twin-cylinder had two air pumps. Rated at 9 HP, the capacity was 780 cc, and weight 240 kg. The Single Cylinder Model H was updated to the H1, and many of its detail design features were changed, and ultimately it looked very much like a H2 minus a cylinder. Only 15 H1's were made. The single-cylinder diesel was phased out in 1960 and the twin in 1968, with only about 400 of each model produced.

A four-stroke twin-cylinder petrol engine (the 12HP ST4/ST4M/ST4MR/ST4RE) was introduced in May 1968. Rated at 12 HP, it was the most powerful engine in the range. This side-valve engine was 955 cc capacity and weighed 155 kg. Both hand-start and electric-start versions were produced, but production was only about 150 engines, and it was phased out in 1975.

In 1969, the P5 and the P55 twin were replaced by the more powerful 5 HP P6 and 10 HP P66 (both at the higher speed of 1650 rpm). There were a number of detailed differences, including a change to the ignition system, but the bore and stroke remained the same.

Stuart Turner marketed some small marine diesels from the Spanish marine engine company Solé Diesel as the Stuart Solé. Solé converts engines from a wide variety of manufacturers for marine use. From a 1977 Stuart Solé operators manual, it is known that Stuart Solé engines were available in 6 hp and 9 hp variants, which seem identical in appearance to the Solé Mini-1 and Mini-2 engines, based on Lombardini engines and made by Solé Diesel between 1974 and 1986. These were a common fitment in vessels made by the Cornish Crabbers boat-building company in the late 1970s and probably into the early 1980s, one 1981 example being listed for sale with an 11 hp Stuart Solé engine.

Stuart Turner ceased their marine engine production in 1978, and the spares and support were transferred to another company. In 1987, Stuart Turner Ltd acquired Morewood Model Engineers and the Stuart Model range moved to Cheddar in Somerset. Still branded as Stuart Models, it was a wholly owned subsidiary of Stuart Turner Ltd. Cheddar Models Ltd was formed as an offshoot from Stuart Models in the late 1980s. In 1991, the brand and range were sold to David Jones of Jones and Bradburn and it moved to Guernsey. When Cheddar Models went bankrupt in 2005 models and plans were absorbed back into the Stuart Model range. At some point, possibly as part of this reorganisation, Stuart Models had acquired the rights to the Plastow Traction Engine model range, which they sold in October 2006 to Bridport foundry of Dorset, who had been responsible for the castings. In July 2012 Stuart Models was bought by Bridport Foundry.

Stuart Turner Ltd continued making domestic water pumps staying at Henley-on-Thames, Oxfordshire, England.

== List of Stuart steam models ==
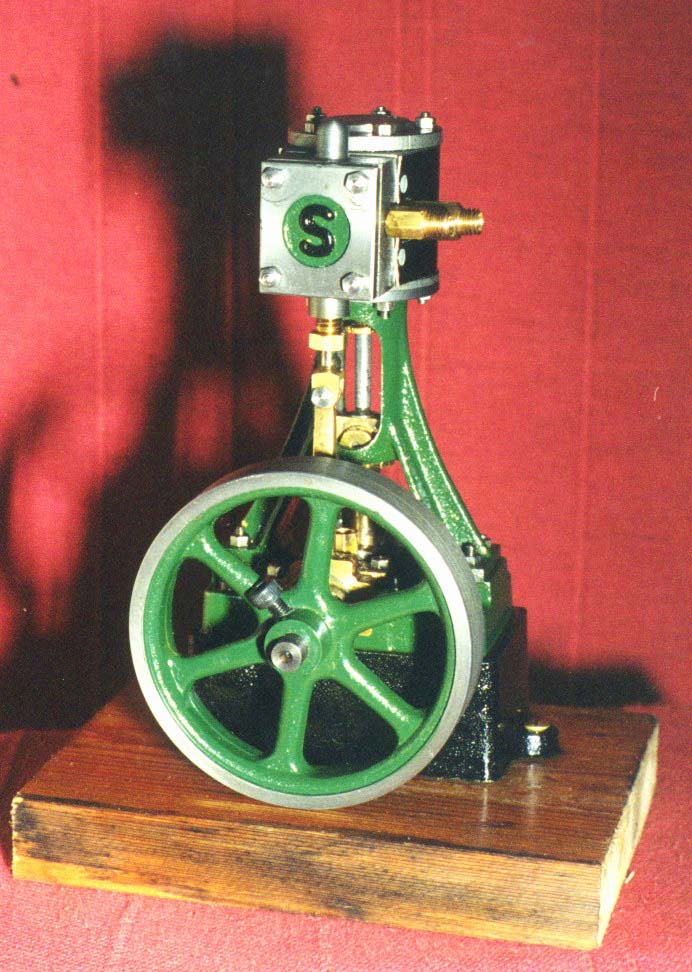
Stuart Turner No.10 V, built from castings. A typical beginner's project

No.1
The original vertical single-cylinder steam engine, bore 2 inches, stroke 2 inches, standing 13 inches high. With single sided support casting and slipper guide, this form of engine is designed to run predominantly in one direction. Still available.

No.2
A short stroke high-speed version of the No 1 single–cylinder steam engine withdrawn in the 1920s.

No.3
A compound twin–cylinder vertical engine, bores 1.25 inches and 2.25 inches, stroke 1.5 inches. Also available as non-compound. This has single-sided support casting and slipper guide as common in marine engines

No.4
A vertical single-cylinder steam engine, bore 1.5 inches, stroke 1.5 inches, standing 10 inches high. With A-frame castings and trunk guide.

No.5
With a 2-inch bore and 2-inch stroke, a heavy 7-inch flywheel, it stands 14.5 inches tall, which is higher than the number 1. engine. It also runs at a higher speed and produces more power than the number 1 engine.

No.5A (Cygnet)
A vertical single-cylinder steam engine popular for steam boats, bore 2.25 inches, stroke 2 inches, standing 15 inches high. With A-frame castings and trunk guide.

Swan
A vertical twin-cylinder steam engine comprising two 5A engines on a common baseplate, popular for steam launches, bore 2.25 inches, stroke 2 inches, standing 15 inches high.

No.6A
A 4 HP compound twin-cylinder vertical engine, bores 2.25 inches and 4 inches, stroke 3 inches, standing 20 inches high. A favourite for larger steam launches.

No.7A
A vertical single-cylinder steam engine, bore 1 inch, stroke 1 inch, standing 7.5 inches high. With A-frame castings and trunk guide.

No.8
A horizontal single-cylinder steam engine, bore 1 inch, stroke 1 inch, 8.5 inches long, with slipper type crosshead guide, so designed for single direction of rotation. This engine is listed in the 1960s with a trunk type bored crosshead guide.

No.9
A larger horizontal single-cylinder steam engine, bore 1.5 inches, stroke 1.5 inches, 11 inches long, with a slipper crosshead guide, so designed for single direction of rotation.

10V
A small, vertical, single-cylinder steam engine, bore 0.75 inches, stroke 0.75 inches, standing 6.5 inches high. The earliest versions of this engine had a single-sided support casting and slipper guide like the No.1, however this was changed to an A-frame casting and trunk guide allowing equal crosshead support when running in either direction (also easier to make on a lathe).

10H
A small, horizontal, single-cylinder steam engine, bore 0.75 inches, stroke 0.75 inches, length 6.5 inches. This has a trunk guide so the crosshead is equally supported for either direction of rotation.

D10
A small twin-cylinder vertical steam engine (based on 10V), bore 0.75 inches, stroke 0.75 inches, standing 6.5 inches high.

Score
A small twin-cylinder horizontal engine, a double 10H, bore 0.75 inches, stroke 0.75 inches, length 6.5 inches.

S50
A small horizontal single-cylinder steam engine, bore 0.625 inches, stroke 1.25 inches, length 8.5 inches.

Beam
Central column style beam engine with Watt's parallel linkage, bore 1 inch, stroke 2 inches.

Half Beam
Grasshopper-style beam engine. Bore 1 inch, stroke 2 inches.

Major Beam
A larger beam engine based on a model published in Model Engineering magazine in 1914. Bore 1.75 inches, stroke 3.75 inches, 18.25 inches high.

Victoria
Typical of low-pressure horizontal Victorian factory engine, 1-inch bore, 2-inch stroke, 15.5 inches long.

Twin victoria
Two Victoria engines driving a common flywheel.

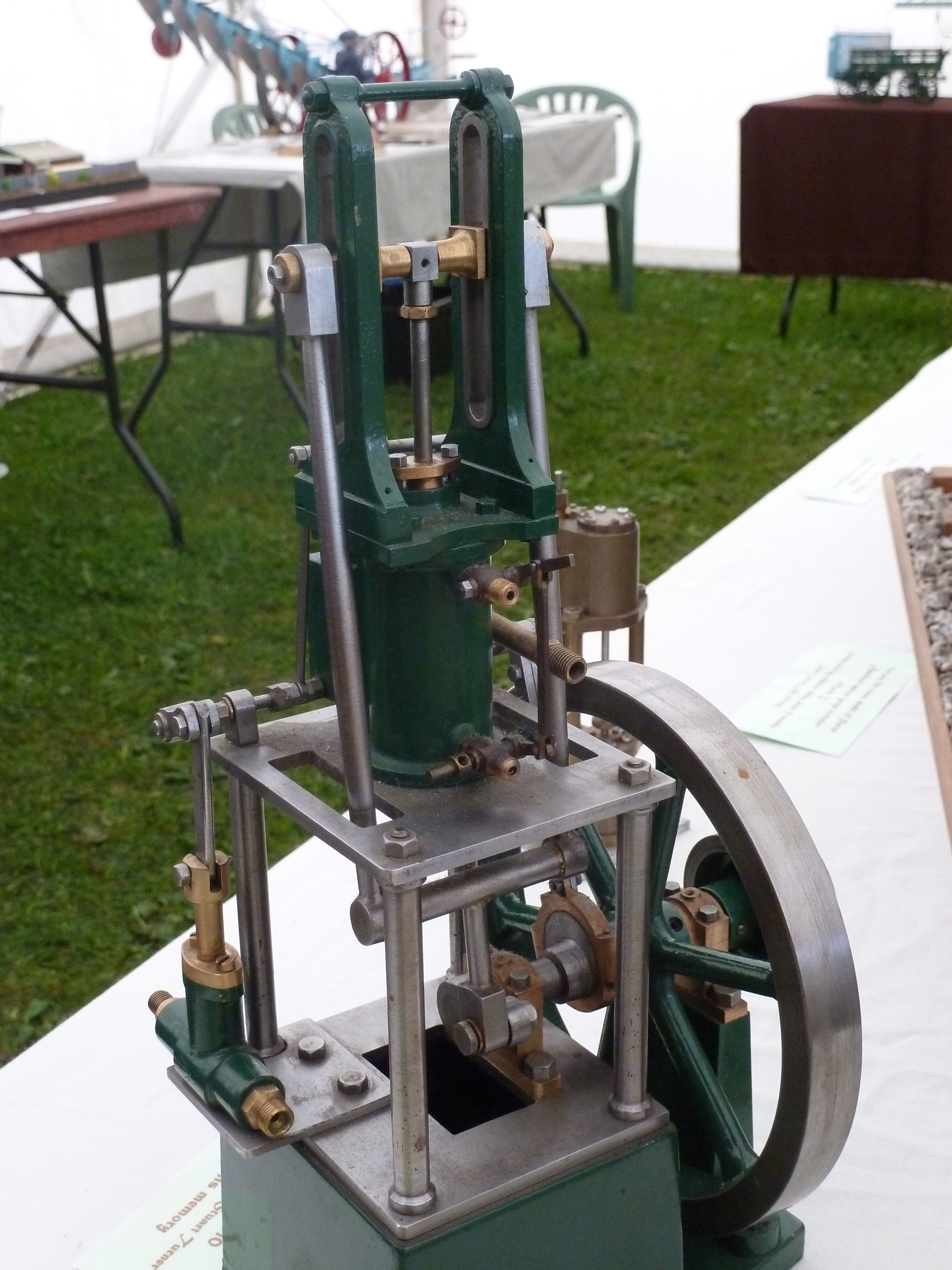
James Coombes' table engine

James Coombes
Based on a table engine that ran at a Bristol colliery, from 1970s, 1-inch bore, 2-inch stroke, 14.5 inches high.

Real
Another 1970s introduction based on a colliery engine. Overhead crank engine, 1-inch bore, 2-inch stroke, 15.5 inches high

Williamson
A model based on an engine made by Williamson of Kendal. This model was researched and designed by Tom Walshaw (pen name Tubal Cain) in 1976. Bore 0.625 inches, stroke 1.125 inches, 11 inches tall.

Oscillator
Also listed as the "S.T." engine. The cylinder pivots, thereby alternately uncovering inlet and exhaust ports (see oscillating cylinder steam engine). Bore and stroke 7/16 inches.

Twin Oscillator
Twin oscillating cylinders set in a 90-degree V to drive a common crank. Introduced c1930.

Puffin
Twin oscillating cylinders set in-line. A model sold as a complete steam plant with boiler as part of the Cheddar Models range in the 1990s, and absorbed into the Stuart Models range, where it was made available as a ready-made standalone engine, or a complete plant with boiler. It has 7/16-inch bore and stroke.

Pintail
Twin oscillating cylinders set in-line. Like the Puffin, this was a model sold as a complete steam plant with boiler as part of the Cheddar Models range in the 1990s, and absorbed into the Stuart Models range where it was made available as a ready-made standalone engine. It has 5/16-inch bore and 7/16-inch stroke.

Progress
This was actually a range of engine kits designed for the owner of only a small lathe, with the cylinder already bored and faced. These were produced in the 1920s and 1930s. There was the vertical oscillating (OV), horizontal oscillating (OH), the vertical slide valve (SV) the horizontal slide valve (SH), and the horizontal mill (HM). The horizontal oscillating engine has been recently re-introduced by Stuart Models.

Meteor
A small vertical single-cylinder marine engine designed for 30-inch boats. 7/16-inch bore and stroke, table-style engine supported on 4 columns with trunk crosshead guide and piston valve. Listed through 1930s.

Simplex
A small vertical single-cylinder engine made in the 1920s, maybe a precursor to the Meteor, with slide valve. Bore and stroke 0.625 inches.

BB
5-inch-tall enclosed vertical steam engine with single-sided ball bearing crankshaft and aluminium crankcase available in 1930s for model boats, e.g. hydroplanes. Bore 0.75 inches, stroke 0.625 inches.

Twin Launch
Twin-cylinder vertical launch engine, bore 1 inch, stroke 0.875 inches. The cylinders are supported on 5 steel columns, and there is single-sided crosshead support.

Compound Launch
Twin-cylinder vertical launch engine but with compound cylinders, bore 0.75 inches and 1.25 inches, stroke 0.875 inches.

Triple Expansion
As in best marine practice, three vertical cylinders 0.75 inches, 1.25 inches, 1.75 inches, all 1-inch stroke.

MTB engines
These were a range of twin-cylinder enclosed engines first introduced in 1906–1909 and resembling the Westinghouse full scale engines (link to sectioned view). The design was aimed at small high speed boat models, of which the motor torpedo boat was in vogue. Ray Nightingale produced a review of the history of these engines.

No.1 MTB
0.75-inch bore and stroke, with cam driven slide valve gear. Available as a complete engine or a set of castings. Weight 2 lb.

No.1a MTB
0.6875-inch bore and 0.625-inch stroke but all aluminium body with brass cylinder liners. Slide valve driven by bevel gear and scotch crank. Available into the 1920s either as a complete engine or a set of castings. Weight 14.5 oz.

No.1b MTB (180)
As the No1 engine but with bevel gear and scotch crank to drive the slide valve. Many have casting number '180' visible. Introduced between 1910 and 1923.

No.2 MTB
As No1 engine but with two geared together contra-rotatory crankshafts. Slide-valve. Ideal for driving twin prop model boats with no torque reaction. Dropped sometime prior to 1924.

No.3 MTB (255)
A larger version of the engine, with 1.25-inch bore and 1-inch stroke. The bevel drive valve gear is enclosed. Casting number 255 on the crankcase. These appeared in about 1924 and were available for 10 years. They were also sold as stationary engines and would drive 120 to 150W output.

Star
The aluminium bodied Star was introduced in 1926 (as was the Isis steam launch she powered). Although similar in design it was a completely new engine and was only available as a finished item. It had 0.625-inch bore and stroke. It used the bevel drive, but this time enclosed within the crankcase. For the valve gear, it used a banjo drive to a close fitting piston valve, this having significant advantages for 'flash' steam plant which could be very high pressure. This engine was produced until the 2nd World War.

Sun
The Sun was launched in 1927 as a direct replacement for the 1b MTB engine. Like the Star, the bevel drive was moved inside the crankcase, and banjo drive was used with a choice of either piston valve or slide valve. Bore and stroke were 0.75 inches. While the slide valve variant was only available as a kit, the piston valve version was available as a complete engine or kit. The Sun continued after the war as a piston valve kit only and last appeared in the Stuart Turner catalogue in 1989/1990.

Sirius
The Sirius was introduced in 1938 as a more powerful version of the Star, with 1-inch bore and stroke. The Sirius was to be the driving force in the Firefly generator set during the war, and is still available (2014). At over 6.5 lb, it was three times heavier than the No1 MTB from which it was descended. It is rated at 1/3 hp at 2800 rpm and 80 psi.

Steam Hammer
This is 1-inch bore and 2-inch stroke, and is a scale model of Rigby's Patent steam hammer made with the co-operation of its manufacturer at the time, R.G. Ross & Son Ltd. It stand 10.5 inches tall, and weighs 9 lb.

Steam Boiler Feed Pump
This is 0.5-inch bore by 0.75-inch stroke, with a 0.25-inch bore single-acting pump. A tappet on the pump rod actuates a small pilot piston valve which in turn controls the main steam-operated shuttle piston valve.

H.U. Horizontal Undertype
This combined horizontal boiler with engine below dates back to a design for a compound undertype engine by Henry Greenly in c. 1901. It is in the Stuart catalogue for 1928, but was dropped by 1940. After a redesign by H.A. Taylor, a larger version of the undertype was re-released onto the market by Stuart Turner in 1973. This later model had an aluminium baseplate 25 inches long, whereas the original model had a smaller cast-iron baseplate.

== Gas/petrol engine kits ==
Stuart Turner Type 600 engine running on gas

400
A horizontal single-cylinder open-crank gas engine dating back to the 1920s with hot tube or spark ignition, 1.6875-inch bore and 3-inch stroke. The crankshaft was overhung, i.e. single main bearing.

600
A substantial horizontal single-cylinder open-crank gas (0.75 HP) or petrol (1.0 HP) engine. 2.5-inch bore, 4.5-inch stroke. From ST's 1930 catalogue "Its very efficient governor renders it particularly adaptable for lathe driving, and other variable loads".

800
A smaller horizontal single-cylinder open-crank gas (0.25 HP) or petrol (0.5 HP) engine based on the 600, but better suited to being made with a small lathe. 1.5-inch bore, 2.75-inch stroke.

Sandhurst
A horizontal single-cylinder open-crank gas (0.66 HP at 900 rpm) or petrol engine. 2-inch bore, 3-inch stroke, 150 cc, c. 1935, but also listed in the 1969 Stuart catalogue.

AE
A 60 cc four-stroke flat twin supplied only as castings, air or water cooled. Could also be supplied as a single-cylinder model, which was a useful capacity for 30 cc tethered boat and hydroplane class. 34.5 mm bore, 32 mm stroke. Made from around 1910–1912, these early versions had an automatic inlet valve.

New AE
A 60 cc four-stroke flat twin supplied only as castings, air- or water-cooled. The 'new' version was introduced in c. 1930 and produced until the war. It had both crankshaft and camshaft running in ball bearings, duralumin connecting rods, aluminium piston, and valves all mechanically operated. There was also a single-cylinder version. The twin produced 3/4 bhp at 3000 rpm, and 1.3 bhp at 4200 rpm, weight 7.5 lb including the flywheel. The single weighed 4.25 lb and produced 0.6 bhp at 4500 rpm. In the 1938/1939 Stuart Turner catalogue the air-cooled version of the twin-cylinder engine was also available with 1.5-inch bore and 1.75-inch stroke, giving 74 cc. The advertising suggests the main market for these engines was 'record breaking model boats and hydroplanes', and the single's 30 cc capacity was stated in 1931 to 'conform(s) to the rules of International Power Boat racing'.

Lightweight
With the same bore and stroke as the AE, the lightweight single-cylinder 2-stroke is 29 cc, 1/8 bhp, revs to 3500 rpm, and weighs 3 lb 12 oz, 5 lb 12 oz with flywheel. Like many Stuart Turner engines the Lightweight had iron pistons. It was water-cooled, and was available either as a finished engine or as a set of castings. Advertised in the 1931 catalogue as 'completely redesigned' making it 'easier to machine and lighter', it was probably introduced in the late 1920s, and was for sale through the 1930s, advertised sitting in the palm of your hand. It also appeared in the 1969 catalogue as a kit either water or air cooled, this time with an aluminium piston. An Amal carburettor was available as an optional extra.

W2
Three 147 cc engines were listed as new in the 1931 Stuart Turner catalogue all rated at 1/2 HP at 1000 rpm. With 53 mm bore and stroke the W2 was a 2-stroke, and water cooled. The engine featured a cast iron piston and steel H section connecting rod. The steel crankshaft could be supported in either plain or ball bearings. The kit did not include a carburettor, stating that 'any good carburetor of the correct size may be used', though a range of extras listed included a Villiers carburetor. Likewise, the magneto was not included, stating that 'any standard single-cylinder magneto of 35 mm centre-height may be used', though an English magneto of unspecified make was listed among the extras available.

A2
The air-cooled version of the W2, identical in every other respect. In this kit only the cylinder was provided ready machined and ground. In the other kits this could be requested as an option.

W4
A water cooled 4-stroke overhead valve version of the W2. Separate inlet and exhaust camshafts ran in bronze bearings. The gear wheels to drive them were supplied ready-made. The four-stroke crankshaft could only use ball bearings.

== Other casting kits ==
Compressor
A compact twin-cylinder air compressor, 2200 cu in air per minute at 1400 rpm.

Oil Field Pump
Known colloquially as the Nodding Donkey, this class of pump is used in onshore oil fields around the world. Height 12 inches.

Manual Boiler Feed Pump
Hand cranked, 3/8-inch bore, 5/8-inch stroke, 4.5 inches long.

Pillar Drill
9-inch-high miniature pillar drill for the model workshop.

Lathe
8.5-inch-long miniature lathe for the model workshop.

Shaper
6.5-inch-high miniature shaper for the model workshop.

== See also ==
- Stuart Turner (engineer)
- Whitney (City Road, London) which made lighting plant, generators, small steam models and centrifugal pumps
