= Maria Billington Hawes =

English contralto singer

Maria Dowding Billington Hawes (1816 – 1886) was an English contralto singer and composer who performed in two Mendelssohn debuts.

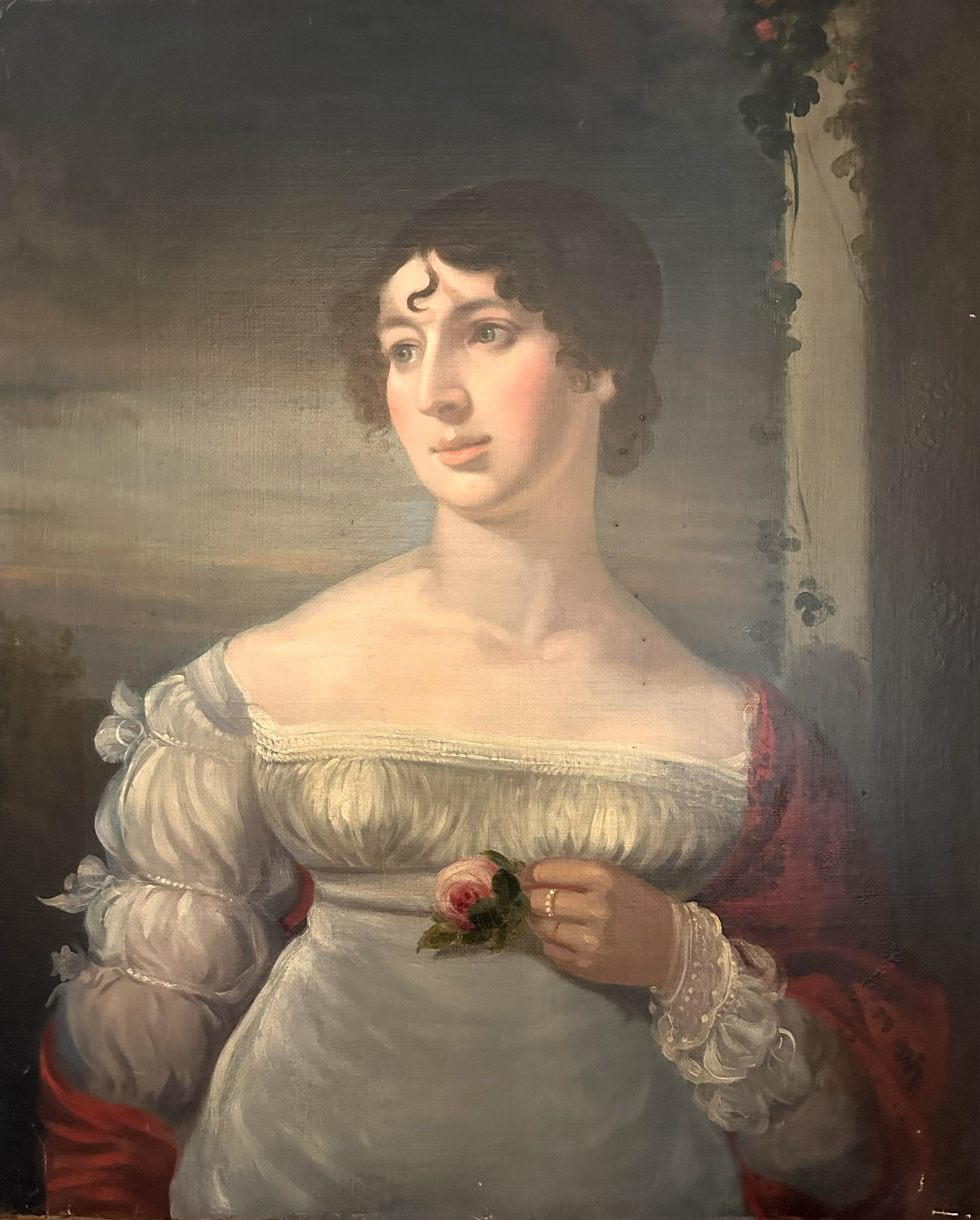
Maria Billington Hawes - (Merest)

She was baptised at St-Martin-in-the-Fields, London, on 21 June 1816, the third daughter of the composer William Hawes, who taught her to sing. Her godmother was opera singer Elizabeth Billington. She made her debut at her father's annual concert in 1832.

She was in contact with Felix Mendelssohn, whom she visited in Germany. She performed at the premier of his Lobgesang (23 September 1840) and was the principle contralto at the premier of his Elijah at the Birmingham Triennial Music Festival of 1846. The aria "O Rest in the Lord" in Elijah was written for her.

She composed 27 songs and hymns including "There be none of beauty's daughters" (1856) and "Oh Lord, thy mercies we proclaim" (1872).

On 18 July 1847 she became the second wife of James Drege Merest, a magistrate of Bury St Edmunds. She died at Ryde, Isle of Wight, on 24 April 1886.
