= Elizabeth Clendining =

English singer (1767–1799)

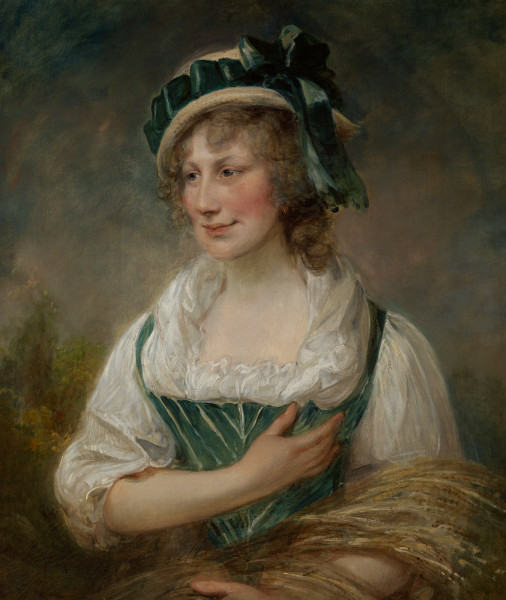
- Born: Elizabeth Arnold; 1767; Stourton with Gasper
- Died: 16 July 1799 (aged 31–32); Edinburgh
- Occupation: Singer
- Spouse: William Clendinning

Elizabeth Clendining (born Elizabeth Arnold; 1767 – 16 July 1799) was a British singer in Ireland and England.

== Life ==
Clendining was baptised in Stourton with Gasper in 1767. Her father was a trained choral singer. In 1773 the family moved to Dublin where her father was to sing in Dublin Cathedral. He died in 1775.

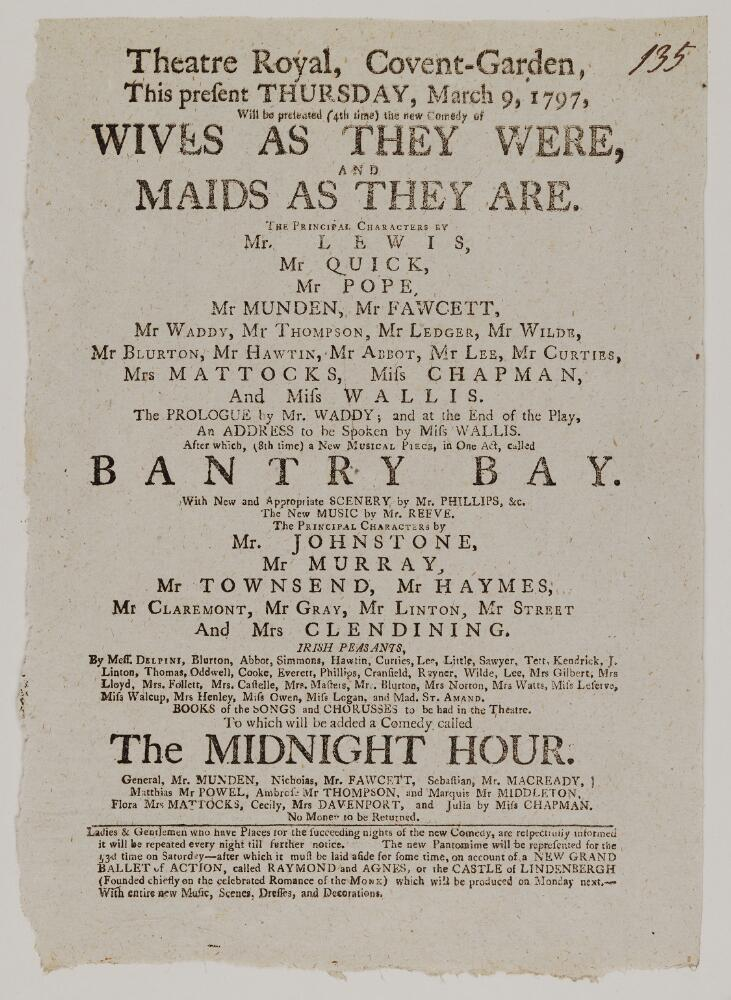
Covent Garden, 9 March 1797, "Wives as they were, and maids as they are" and "Bantry Bay" featuring Mrs Clendinning

By 1785 she was a singer being paid 60 guineas to perform at the Rotunda Summer concerts. The year she married a surgeon names William Clendining. She retired from the stage and they had a daughter. She returned to performing when her husband was sent to the debtors' prison.

In 1791 went to stay in London with the English singer Elizabeth Billington who she had met in Dublin. Clendinning had only a few pounds, her husband was in prison and she had a small family. She tried and failed to find work in London, but she had a contact in Bath. She had met the flautist Andrew Ashe at the Dublin Rotunda concerts and he now directed the Bath concerts. He introduced her to Venanzio Rauzzini who gave her singing lessons. Rauzzini tried her out at a benefit concert for Ashe and she was then engaged by the "Catch Club" in Bath. Her benefit there in 1792 raised enough money to pay off her husband's debts. He left prison in Dublin and took a job as a ship's surgeon and died in 1793 at Portsmouth.

In 1792 William Shield created a part for her in his work "Hartford Bridge". She appeared in the role of Clara and this was her debut at Covent Garden and her debut on the stage. It went well and she had to give an encore when she completed her first song.

In 1797 she returned from Ireland where she had been singing with Charles Incledon to perform again at Covent Garden. She was ill and this was her last season at Covent Garden. She appeared in "Bantry Bay" in the March.

In August 17?? she was appearing in her own benefit performance in Brighton before the Countess of Jersey. The benefit raised £80.

Clendining died in Edinburgh in 1799.
