= Robert Ash =

Robert Ash may refer to:

- Rob Ash (born 1951), American football coach
- Bobby Ash (1925–2007), British actor
- Bob Ash (born 1943), Canadian ice hockey player
- Robert Ash (engineer), Robert "Bob" Ash, American engineer and academic; Professor of Mechanical & Aerospace Engineering

== See also ==
- Robert Ashe (disambiguation)
