= Stuart Turner (engineer) =

Founder of Stuart Turner Ltd

Sidney Marmaduke Stuart Turner (1869 – April 1938) was an English engineer. He was the founder of the company Stuart Turner Ltd.

== Biography ==
Turner was born in Shepherd's Bush, London in 1869. Little is known about his childhood or adolescence although it is known that his family's ambitions for him did not include becoming an engineer.

== Career ==
After a series of other jobs including an apprenticeship on the Clyde building marine engines, a period at sea and working as an engineer in Jersey (where he installed electricity generating plant), Turner gained employment in 1897 looking after the steam generating plant at Shiplake Court near Henley-on-Thames, England. In those days mains electricity was rare and therefore most large houses had their own electricity generating plants.

It was while working at Shiplake that Turner designed his No.1 Model Steam Engine. He drew up the patterns which he then sent away to be cast. On their return he machined and assembled them and soon showed the finished model at a local exhibition. He then approached Percival Marshall the editor of Model Engineer magazine who wrote an article about the engine. This coverage brought an immediate response and orders for sets of castings flooded in, and a business was established in 1898. He was joined in the business by Alexander Frederick (Alec) Plint in 1903, who he had worked with in Jersey and was trained in electrical engineering. This business produced an unusual mixture of small mainly two-stroke engines used in boats, generators, as well as model engines and castings aimed at the model engineering market. They also briefly made a motorcycle and the Stuart lathe, and latterly a range of centrifugal pumps. The name Stuart Turner is eponymous with small quality models, and many of the steam models and rarer internal combustion models are much sought after by collectors.

The Stuart Turner Ltd company was established in 1906 in Henley-on-Thames.

== Death ==
Stuart Turner left the firm in 1920 and went to South Africa. He returned to Southend to retire and died in April 1938.

== See also ==
- Stuart Turner (company)
- Whitney (City Road, London) who made lighting plant, generators, small steam models and centrifugal pumps
