= Shiplake Court =

Coordinates: 51°29′53″N 0°53′38″W

Shiplake Court was a historic manor house near Henley-on-Thames in Oxfordshire, England. In the sixteenth century, it was the residence of Edmund Plowden. In 1897, it had its own electricity generating plant, managed by Stuart Turner. The independent school, Shiplake College, is now on the manor house's grounds.
