= Edward Ashe =

Edward Ashe may refer to:

- Edward Ashe (died 1656), Member of Parliament for Heytesbury 1640–52
- Edward Ashe (died 1731), his son, Member of Parliament for Heytesbury 1679–89
- Edward Ashe (died 1748), Member of Parliament for Heytesbury 1695–1747
