= Platteville Public Transportation =

Transit service in Platteville, Wisconsin

- Founded: May 2016 (bus service began)
- Headquarters: 75 N. Bonson Street, Platteville, WI
- Locale: Platteville, WI
- Service type: bus service, paratransit
- Routes: 4
- Fleet: 10
- Annual ridership: 60,686 (2022)
- Website: platteville.org/transportation

Platteville Public Transportation is the public transportation system in Platteville, Wisconsin. It is owned by the city of Platteville and operated by Russ Stratton Buses, Inc. Fixed route bus service began in May 2016, although Platteville had a shared ride taxi as public transport prior.

== Services ==
The transit system operates four routes which run during the academic year at UW-Platteville. During the summer months, only one route is in operation. Service is only provided Monday through Saturday. The routes are as follows:

- Black Route: 7am-7pm Monday through Friday year round
- Orange Route: 7am-7pm Monday through Friday during the academic year
- Purple Route: 2pm-6pm Saturdays during the academic year
- Green Route: 7pm-3:30am Friday and Saturday during the academic year

== Ridership ==
	Ridership	Change over previous year
2016	84,019	n/a
2017	90,797	▲8.07%
2018	97,264	▲7.12%
2019	101,080	▲3.92%
2020	87,921	▼13.02%
2021	59,396	▼32.44%
2022	60,686	▲2.17%
2023	79,482	▲30.97%

== See also ==
- The Jule
- Scenic Mississippi Regional Transit
- Madison Metro Transit
