= Andrew Ashe =

- Died: 1838
- Occupation: Musician
- Instrument: Flute

Andrew Ashe (c. 1758–1838) was an Irish flautist who became director of the Bath concerts.

== Life ==
Ashe was native of Lisburn and born in about 1758. He was educated in music at Woolwich. "On account of reverses of fortune, his parents were about removing him, when Count Bentinck adopted the lad, took him to the Continent, and secured for him a musical education. He devoted himself to the flute, and rose to be principal player in Brussels, Dublin, and London, successively — being one of the first to use the additional keys. After engagements in the Italian opera, in 1810 he became director of the Bath concerts. In Bath he was able to launch the career of the singer Elizabeth Clendining who he had met years before at the Dublin Rotunda concerts. He introduced her to Venanzio Rauzzini who gave her singing lessons.

Ashe spent the last years of his life in retirement in Dublin, and died in 1838. His wife and daughter were celebrated pianists."
