= Samuel Ashe =

Samuel Ashe may refer to:

- Samuel Ashe (North Carolina governor) (1725–1813), American politician, governor of North Carolina
  - SS Samuel Ashe, a Liberty ship
- Samuel A'Court Ashe (1840–1938), American politician and Confederate soldier
- Samuel Ashe (MP) (died 1708), English lawyer and politician
