= Elizabeth Billington =

British opera singer

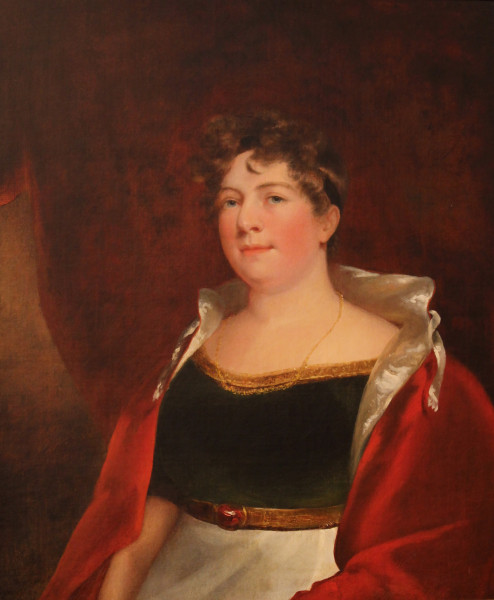
- by John James Masquerier
- Born: Elizabeth Weichsel; 1765; London
- Died: 25 August 1818; Venice
- Occupation: opera singer

Elizabeth Billington (27 December 1765 – 25 August 1818) was a British operatic soprano singer.

== Life ==
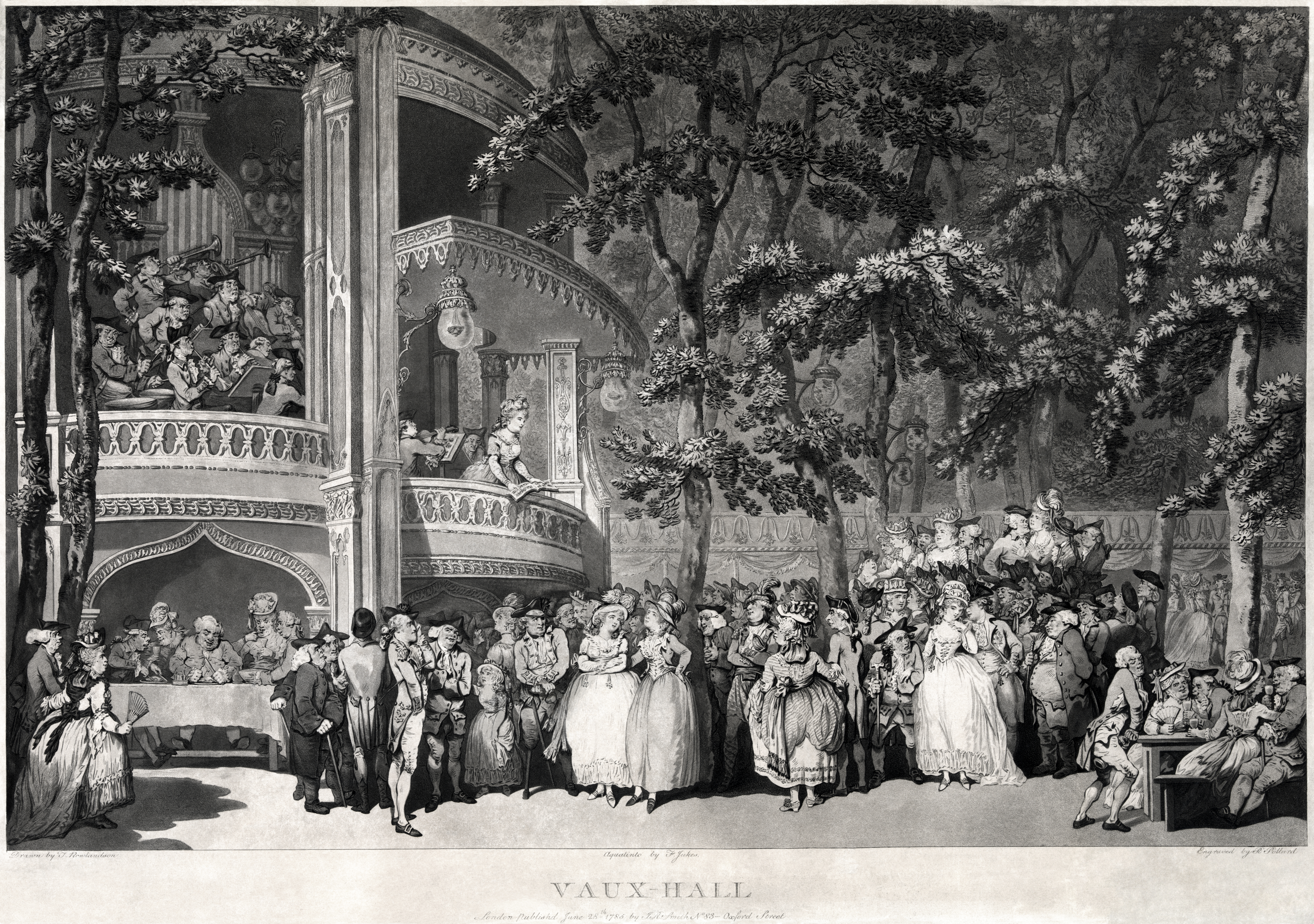
Frederika Weichsell, mother of Mrs. Elizabeth Billington

She was born on 27 December 1765 in Litchfield Street, Soho, London, the daughter of Carl Weichsel, a native of Freiberg, in Saxony, who was principal oboist at the King's Theatre. Her mother, Frederika, née Weirman, an English vocalist of some distinction, was a pupil of Johann Christian Bach, and sang at Vauxhall with success between 1765 and 1775.

Elizabeth Weichsel received her earliest musical instruction, in company with her brother Charles (who afterwards was known as a violinist) from her father, under whom she studied the pianoforte with such assiduity that on 10 March 1774 she played at a concert at the Haymarket for her mother's benefit. In addition to her father's instruction she studied under Johann Samuel Schroeter, and before she was twelve years old published two sets of pianoforte sonatas. She now began to turn her attention to the cultivation of her voice, and at the early age of fourteen appeared at a public concert in Oxford.

On 13 October 1783 she was married under her mother's maiden name, Wierman, at Lambeth Church to James Billington, a double-bass player in the Drury Lane orchestra, from whom she had had lessons in singing. Immediately after their marriage the Billingtons went to Dublin, where she made her first appearance on the stage in the part of Eurydice. After singing at Waterford and other towns in Ireland she returned to London in 1786, and was offered an engagement at Covent Garden for three nights only, but she insisted on being engaged for twelve nights, at a salary of £12 a week. On these terms she was announced to appear on 14 Feb. 1786, but the renown she had already won in Dublin had preceded her, and 'by command of their majesties' she appeared on the 13th as Rosetta in Thomas Arne's Love in a Village. At the end of the twelve nights she was engaged for the rest of the season at a salary of £1,000.

A contemporary account of her at this period says that her voice was of great sweetness, compass, and power, and that she possessed 'a great deal of genuine beauty and very unaffected and charming manners;' but the secret of her great success was the unremitting zeal with which she studied her art. Her brother-in-law, Thomas Billington, says that she had originally 'a very indifferent voice and manner,' which she completely changed by the industry with which, throughout her public career, she pursued her studies. At the end of her first season she went to Paris, and had lessons from the Antonio Sacchini, whose last pupil she was, and at different periods of her career she also studied with Morelli, Ferdinando Paer, and Friedrich Heinrich Himmel. She returned to London for the season of 1786–7, and continued to sing there, at Covent Garden, the Concerts of Ancient Music, the so-called Oratorios, and the Handel Commemorations, until the end of 1793. William Shield wrote his operas of 'Marian' and 'The Prophet' for her, and in 1789 she appeared as Yarico in Dr. Arnold's long-popular compilation, 'Inkle and Yarico.' Others of her favourite parts were Mandane (in 'Artaxerxes'), and the heroines in 'Polly,' the 'Duenna,' the 'Castle of Andalusia,' 'Corali,' 'Clara,' the 'Flitch of Bacon'.

In 1791 she was kind enough to take in Elizabeth Clendining who she had met in Dublin. Clendinning had a short singing career before she retired to have a family, but her husband was in Dublin debtors' prison and she came to England to find work and she found work initially in Bath. Mrs. Billington was not happy in her marriage, and even before she had appeared on the London stage rumour had been busy with her fair fame. In 1792 there appeared an anonymous publication, which professed to contain her private correspondence with her mother. This work was of so disgraceful and scurrilous a description that Mrs. Billington was forced to take legal proceedings against the publishers. An answer to the 'Memoirs' appeared in due course; but it seems probable that the scandal induced Mrs. Billington to abandon her profession and retire to the Continent. Accompanied by her brother and her husband, she left England early in 1794, and travelled by way of Germany to Italy. At Naples she was induced by Sir William Hamilton, the English ambassador, to sing in private before the royal family. This led to her singing at the San Carlo, where she appeared in a new opera, 'Inez di Castro,' written expressly for her by Francesco Bianchi, on 30 May 1794. Her singing created an extraordinary impression, but her triumph was cut short by the sudden death of her husband, which took place the day after her first appearance, as he was preparing to accompany his wife to the theatre, after dining with the Bishop of Winchester. She stayed at Naples sixteen months, and then sang at Florence, Leghorn, Milan, Venice, and Trieste. In 1797, when singing at Venice, she was prostrated with a severe illness for six weeks. On her recovery the opera house was illuminated for three nights.

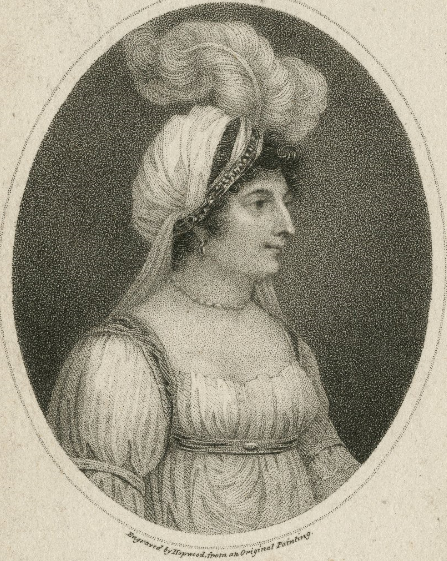
Mrs Billington by James Hopwood

At Milan she was received with much favour by the Joséphine de Beauharnais, and here she met a young Frenchman, M. Felissent, to whom she was married in 1799. After her second marriage she went to live at St. Artien, an estate she had bought between Venice and Treviso; but her life was rendered so insupportable by the ill-treatment she received from her husband that in 1801 she left him and returned to England. Felissent, who, it was said, had been publicly flogged as an impostor at Milan, followed her to London, but he was arrested and expelled the country as an alien.

Mrs. Billington's return to London caused a great stir in the musical world, and the managers both of Covent Garden (Harris) and Drury Lane (Richard Brinsley Sheridan) were eager to secure her services. After some negotiation it was arranged that she should appear alternately at both houses, the terms she was to receive being 3,000 guineas for the season, together with a benefit guaranteed to amount to £500, and £500 to her brother for leading the orchestra on the nights she appeared. Her reappearance took place at Covent Garden on 3 Oct. 1801, in Thomas Arne's Artaxerxes, in which she sang the part of Mandane, Incledon singing that of Arbaces. During 1801 she made from £10,000 to £15,000, and at one time her fortune is said to have amounted to £65,000. In 1802 Mrs. Billington appeared in Italian opera at the King's Theatre, on the occasion of the farewell of Banti, when both these great artists sang in Sebastiano Nasolini's 'Merope.' A similar performance took place on 3 June of the same year, when she was induced to sing a duet with Mara, at the farewell concert of her great rival. From this time until her retirement in 1811 she continued to sing in Italian opera. Winter wrote his 'Calypso' (1803) expressly for her, and in 1806 she distinguished herself by producing, for her benefit, La Clemenza di Tito, the first opera by Wolfgang Amadeus Mozart performed in this country. During 1809-10 she suffered much from ill-health, and at length she retired from the profession, her last appearance being announced at her brother's benefit concert on 3 May 1811. She appeared, however, once more at Whitehall Chapel in 1814, at a concert in aid of the sufferers by the German war. After her retirement she lived in princely style at a villa at Fulham. In 1817 she was reconciled to her husband, and went with him to live near Venice, where she died on 25 August 1818.

Her child by her first husband had died in infancy; but it was believed that an adopted child, whom she had placed in a convent at Brussels, was her own daughter.

== Critical reception ==
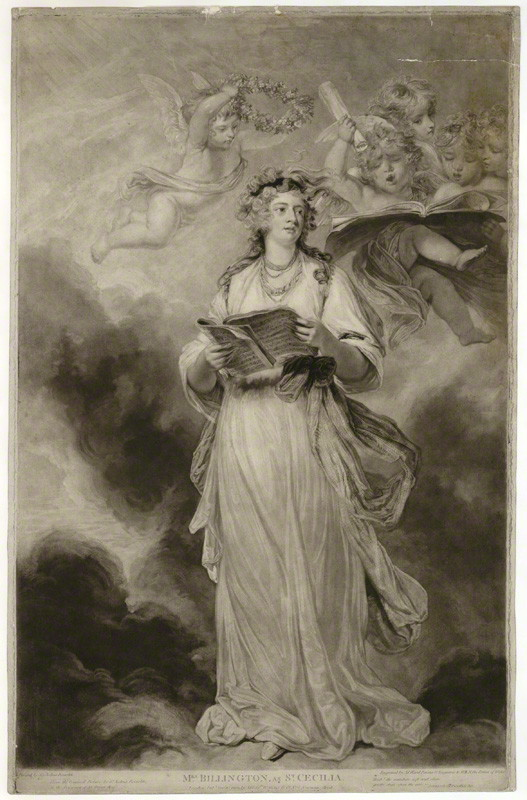
Elizabeth Billington, after Sir Joshua Reynolds

Contemporary opinions as to the merits of Mrs. Billington as a singer differ to a singular degree. It was always her misfortune to be forced into a position of rivalry with some other great artist, and thus partisanship often guided the judgments of her critics. As to the perfect finish of her singing all are agreed. The Earl of Mount Edgcombe says that her voice was sweet and flexible, her execution neat and precise, her embellishments in good taste and judicious, but that she lacked feeling, and was no actress. Miss Seward writes of her : 'She has too much sense to gambol like Mara in the sacred songs;' but George III, who was no mean judge—by suggesting in a written memorandum, that Lord Carmarthen 'if he can get her to sing pathetick songs, and not to over-grace them, will be doing an essential service to the court'—seems to imply that she had the great fault of the singers of that day, viz. the excessive and indiscriminate use of vocal embellishments. She was all through her life a finished pianist. Salomon used to say that 'she sang with her fingers,' and quite late in life she played a duet in public with J. B. Cramer.

In person Mrs. Billington was very handsome, though inclined to stoutness. Her portrait was painted by Sir Joshua Reynolds as Saint Cecilia, and has been engraved by James Ward, Pastorini, and Cardon. The exhibition of old masters at Burlington House in 1885 contained a small portrait by Reynolds, said to be of Mrs. Billington in her youth, a statement which is probably inaccurate. Two miniatures of her were painted, one by Daniel, and there are engravings of her by T. Burke after De Koster, as Mandane by Heath after Stothard, by Bartolozzi after Cosway, by Dunkarton after Downman, and by Assen. A portrait of Clara in the 'Duenna,' painted and engraved by J. R. Smith in 1797, probably represents Mrs. Billington. Haydn said of her, that Sir Joshua Reynolds should rather have painted the angels listening to Mrs Billington singing, than have depicted, as he did, Mrs Billington listening to the angels.

== Sources ==
- A biographical dictionary of actors, actresses, musicians,..., volume 2
- Memoir of Mrs. Billington
- H. Jachmann, intro. J.M. Lewis, Wagner and his First Elisabeth (Novello, London 1944).
