= Robert Hoadley Ashe =

Robert Hoadley Ashe (1751–1826) was an English divine.

== Life ==
Ashe was born about 1751, the son of a prebendary of Winchester, educated at Pembroke College, Oxford, compounded for M.A. 1793, and B.D. and D.D. 1794. From 1775 to 1826 he held the living of Crewkerne, Somerset.

He took the name of Hoadley upon inheriting a property from his aunt, who had married a son of Bishop Hoadley. He died on 3 May 1826.

== Works ==
Ashe edited in 1787 a volume of poetical translations by "Master John Browne of Crewkerne, a boy of twelve years old". In 1799 he published a letter to John Milner, author of the history of Winchester, vindicating Bishop Hoadley from Milner's "false and illiberal aspersions". Several letters of his are printed in Nichols's 'Illustrations'.
