= Whitney (City Road, London) =

Messrs Whitney
- Industry: mechanical and electrical engineering
- Founded: 1875
- Defunct: c. 1941
- Headquarters: London, England
- Key people: Edward Whitney Snr., Edward Whitney Jnr., Charles Whitney
- Products: small engines, dynamos, pumps, boilers

Whitney was initially a shop established in 1875 in City Road, London, for the buying and selling of scientific apparatus, also using the name The Scientific Exchange. It later developed to include the sale of small engineering items including model steam engines, boilers, gas engines, steam pumps, electrically driven water fountain pumps, and water powered turbines (the Whitney Water Motor), most of which were marked Whitney, City Road, London. The electrical side of the business was considerable and included installing telephone systems and electric lighting, as well as selling generators and batteries.

== Early history ==
The Whitney Water Motor c1906

The early history of the business was captured in the Model Engineer magazine in 1919. Edward Whitney created the business trading in scientific equipment as a sideline to his existing business, and so placed it under his son Edward Elgar Whitney in 1875. When Edward Whitney Snr died in 1888 the business was consolidated under the control of his sons Edward Elgar Whitney and Charles Crapnell Whitney at 129 City Road, later expanding to include 131 City Road (and c.1905 to 1911 also at 117 City Road). A substantial part of the business became model and small scale engineering particularly related to small-scale generation of electricity for charging batteries and lighting, and ways of driving other light loads including gas, oil and steam engines.

One product that was to have a particularly long run was the Whitney Water Motor, a small (8.5 inch) enclosed Pelton water wheel. Connected to a water supply this could be used to drive light loads via a pulley and belt. Water motors had uses such as laboratory stirrers, charging batteries, and driving sewing machines. It was reported in 1905 that the Whitney Water Motor was rated at 1/4h.p. with 60psi water pressure, which they felt was conservative. It was still advertised in 1931, available as a complete unit, or as a set of castings.

There was a substantial electrical side to their business including generators and batteries, but also extending to installing telephone systems, and lighting, for businesses. In the 1890s they had a very visible advert in City Road as they had erected an arc lamp enclosed in a large elaborate globe. This was driven by current from their own Atkinson twin-cylinder gas engine driving an electric generator, and was at the time the only electric light in the neighbourhood.

== First World War ==
During the war, the engineering side of Whitney was involved in the production of gunmetal bevel wheels for aircraft, and pressure safety valves that were modified for use on aircraft fuel tanks. The electrical side of the business was involved in the production of field telephone sets, and accumulators (electrochemical cell batteries) for war purposes.

At some time during or immediately after the war, the company acquired stock and casting patterns from several companies, including the model steam fittings of Betrand Garside, the model locomotive 'specialities' of Southwark Engineering Co, and the productions of the Gas Engine Repair Co.

== Inter-war Years ==
While Whitney bought and sold a wide range of different model engines, they increasingly developed their own line of model steam engines, particularly for model marine use, and also small steam powered water pumps, and steam boilers. These fairly distinctive models are invariably maroon in colour and comprise a large amount of brass or bronze castings in preference to cast iron. They all bore a small oval badge stating Whitney City Road London, and it seems likely they were sold as complete items rather than as sets of castings. There were at least two steam engines designed to drive two contra-rotating propeller shafts, using two crankshafts geared together. One used two vertical slide valve cylinders arranged as a twin cylinder compound engine, and another was a twin cylinder single acting unit with a layout similar to the Stuart Turner No.2 MTB engine, though all in brass/bronze.

The business continued to buy and sell scientific equipment through the 1920s, especially electrical equipment such as Wimshurst machines (devices for creating a high voltage). It appears the model steam engines ceased in the early 1930s as adverts in the Model Engineer from about 1933 are for their electrically driven water pump for garden fountains.

The business lasted until the war, and there are references to centrifugal water pumps for air raid shelters by a C.C.Whitney & Co Ltd of London during the war years. The business was reported to have been "bombed out" during the war.

== See also ==
- Stuart Turner (engineer)
