= Thomas Ashe (legal writer) =

English legal writer

Thomas Ashe or Ash (fl. 1600–1618), was an English legal writer. Ashe entered as a student of Gray's Inn in 1574, was called to the bar 24 January 1582–83, and became pensioner of his inn 17 October 1597.

== Works ==
He was the author of the following works:

- 'Abridgment des touts les cases reportez alarge per Monsieur Plowden . . . compose & digest par T. A [she],' 1600? of which another edition appeared in 1607.
- 'Επιεικεια: et table generall a les annales del ley per quel facilement troveres touts les cases contenus in yceux; queux concerne le exposition des statutes per equitie,' 1609; with an appendix of cases reported by 'G. Dalison and G. Bendloes, in Queen Elizabeth's reign.
- 'Le Primer Volume del Promptuaire; ou repertory de les annales et plusors auters livres del common ley Dengleterre,' 1614.
- 'Fasciculus florum; or a Handfull of Flowers gathered out of the severall bookes of the Right Honorable Sir E. Coke,' 1618.

'A Generall Table' to Coke's reports, issued in 1652, has been attributed to Ashe.
