= Trevor Ashe =

Irish writer, newspaper editor & publisher (1770-1836)

- Born: July 15, 1770; Glasnevin, Ireland
- Died: January 1836 (aged 65–66); Bath, England
- Occupations: Writer, newspaper editor, publisher, museum director and entrepreneur
- Known for: Author of the first Manx novel, The Manks Monastery (1792)

Trevor Ashe (1770–1836) (also known as Thomas Ashe) was a writer, newspaper editor, publisher, museum director and entrepreneur, as well as a confidence trickster and blackmailer. He is best known on the Isle of Man for having opened the first "Manx Museum" in 1825, as well as having published the first Manx novel and one of the Island's earliest books of poetry. He is also notable for his attempt to blackmail the Duke of Cumberland in 1830.

== Early life and The Manks Monastery ==
Ashe was born on 15 July 1770 in Glasnevin, Ireland, to a father who was a half-pay officer in the Royal Navy. His youthful career has been colourfully described as consisting of "seduction, duelling, debt and imprisonment" before a period of foreign travel and then the taking up of "literary pursuits, writing, among some scientific and geographical works, several novels." In his 1828 Confessions, Ashe writes of the circumstances that brought him to write the most significant of these books:

"Possessing now my half-pay… I formed the resolution of retiring to some cheap place, and of living independently on my own contracted means. I chose the Isle of Man; but so little did this project succeed, that I spent nearly all my ready money, and was considerably in debt in the course of two years. To meet this exigency, and to release me from this Island, I composed a little romance, entitled, "The Manx Monastery; or Memoirs of Belville and Julia." I dedicated it to Mr. Taubman; and it had the effect I desired. It raised sufficient funds to sent me off the Island…"

Published in 1792, The Manks Monastery is recognised as the first known novel with a Manx setting. Ashe claimed that the novel was based on historical documents that he had been given, but that seems unlikely, not least because: "The focal point of the book consists of the long-drawn-out seduction of Julia, a young nun, accompanied by much weeping by the two lovers." The only known copy of this book exists in the Manx National Heritage Library and Archives at the Manx Museum, making it "the rarest book of Manx fiction."

Once back in the UK, Ashe moved into journalism, acting as the Parliamentary Reporter for the Morning Herald for a period until 1811. From 1820 until 1823 Ashe was living in York under the name of Philip Frances Sidney. It was under this guise that he edited the Yorkshire Gazette, for little more than a year, and then the Yorkshire Observer, for only a matter of weeks. It was in these papers that Ashe published a number of essays which were later collected as The Hermit of York: A Series of Essays on a Variety of Subjects, published in Hull in 1823.

== Publishing in the Isle of Man ==
Ashe moved to the Isle of Man to take up the position of Editor of the Manx Sun in late October 1824. However, this did not last much longer than a month as he was replaced by James Grellier by 14 December 1824. However, this did not end his association with the paper as he wrote a great many articles for them over the coming year and more, including theatre reviews (for which some theatres tried to sue him for slander) and a defence of the poetry of Eliza Craven Green.

Ashe began publishing books and other publications shortly after arriving on the Island. The first proposed was Views of the Ocean from the Isle of Man, advertised in December 1824, but it is believed that this was never printed in the form proposed. Ashe is presumed to be behind the Isle of Man Literary Journal which perhaps saw no more editions than its first, which appeared on 19 March 1825. Another proposed journal was The Isle of Man Magazine, for which Ashe asked for subscriptions, but it never seemingly got into print. A later proposed scheme which is believed never to have got into print was the newspaper, The Manx Lynx, which was advertised in November 1826. It would also appear that Ashe was behind, or at least involved in, the first publication by Eliza Craven Green, A Legend of Mona.

Two significant books by Ashe were published in August 1825: The Manx Sketch Book, or Beauties of the Isle of Man and The Pier and Bay of Douglas; or, Forget Me Not from the Isle of Man, in a Series of Marine Poems. The Sketch Book consisted of a number of lithographic prints (probably originally intended for his Views of the Ocean from the Isle of Man) and William Cubbon has referred to the book as "one of the most charming publications of the early part of the nineteenth century." Within the space of two months of the book having been available, Ashe claimed to have sold 2,000 copies, and had already printed 6,000 more in anticipation of the sales to be obtained during the next year's tourist season.

The Pier and Bay of Douglas was a book of 26 poems, which is now recognised as amongst the earliest books of poetry of the Isle of Man, pre-dating the likes of Eliza Craven Green, Esther Nelson and Rev Robert Brown by many years. However, the quality of the book has been cast into doubt by modern scholars:

"As for Ashe, the titles are the most Manx part of his poems. He started a trend of 'topographical' poems, describing various houses with the owner’s name thrown in as a selling-point. The poems themselves are on the whole conventional in imagery and content but reveal a genuine fascination with the sea."

Further to this, at least one poem in the book has been identified as plagiarised from Lord Byron's Childe Harold, casting doubt on the rest of the work. By 1939 there were only four known copies of this book extant.

== The Manx Museum ==
Ashe is perhaps most often recalled on the Isle of Man as the founder of a "Manx Museum," predating the Manx National Heritage Manx Museum by nearly 100 years. On 16 July 1825 the Museum was announced as open on the North Quay in Douglas, promising "Natural and Artificial Curiosities, Remains of Antiquity, scarce Subjects in the Manx Mineral, Vegetable, and Animal Kingdoms, &c. &c." By 23 July the Museum had taken on a Museum Keeper, as well as Ashe in the role of Director, to keep the Museum open daily from 8 am until 9 pm. The collections were explained as consisting of three parts: "Subjects, strictly curious; Books and Prints, scarce or out of print; and original Paintings or Drawings."

The Museum met with great success upon its first week of opening, inspiring Ashe to extend the collections of the Museum and to move it to larger premises on Duke Street, a move completed by 3 August 1825. This extension of the Museum included a Library and Literary Lounge, apparently enlarging the establishment "to the sphere of a Temple of Fancy," which promised "public accommodation to ladies of taste and reading."

However, it appears that Ashe overestimated the continued success of the Museum as he was obliged to organise a public lottery on 17 October to raise funds to pay off his debts. This sale of books and prints was initially excused by Ashe as being to free himself from distraction for the sake of the Museum: "disposing speedily with a valuable Stock which diverts his attention too much from his Museum, – the extent and character of which now occupy all his thoughts, and demand his entire care." But by the time that two thirds of the tickets had been sold, Ashe was able to note that "Tradesmen and Artists may send in their Bills." However, despite the relative success of the lottery, within only ten days of its taking place, Ashe made a public announcement of the Museum's failure:

"all my efforts to establish a Museum in Douglas, and diffuse a love of Literature and Science throughout the Island, have finally terminated in unqualified loss, disappointment, and despair. [...] my failure is complete from end to end, and I am doomed to sink a daring spirit into the mute acquiescence of broken-heartedness."

After recognising his own failure in launching the Museum too late in the season and not controlling outlay sufficiently, he saw the "grand cause" of his "total failure" to lie with the people of the Isle of Man:

"Gentlemen, – that cause exists in the party spirit which reigns in this Island, – a spirit which, while it exercises its accursed domination over the land, will never allow it to become a rich mart of Literature, or a proper theatre of undertakings of merit, magnitude or taste. Nearly all minds are stimulated to such a degree by party spirit, that very few can be devoted to the Sciences, and Belles Lettres. How, then, Gentlemen, could labours and institutions, like mine, be expected to meet with common encouragement, much less adequate reward?"

Regardless of the reasons for the failure of the Museum, Ashe declared himself insolvent at the end of December 1825 and was incarcerated for debt in Castle Rushen.

Contemporary descriptions of Ashe's Museum were tinged with rancour over Ashe's debt and later behaviour, bringing descriptions of the Museum episode such as: "He then begged and borrowed all the old prints, books, and stuffed fishes and birds, with pebbles from Peel Bay, and antediluvian nuts, – and which medley he quizzically called a Museum – himself the most awful curiosity in the collection." However, although modern estimations recognise the limitations of the Museum by modern standards, it is now seen as a worthy institution for that time: "The first Manx Museum was founded in the contemporary tradition of scientific knowledge, and interest in Manx antiquities and natural history, and as such is worth respect."

== Later life and blackmail ==
Ashe remained on the Isle of Man after his release from Castle Rushen, and made a return to journalism and publishing. Newspaper reports have him editing a journal for the Duke of Atholl, before moving on to become "editor of a popular journal", and then returning again to the Duke. He seems to have made an extra income from his journalism by receiving payment from individuals to write slanderous or damaging pieces about rivals or enemies. Ashe soon extended the use of slanderous journalism to carry out blackmail, threatening to publish his own pieces about people if they did not pay him. Apparently at the same time as this blackmail, in 1827 Ashe made an attempt to set up as an estate agent, apparently with both a Douglas and a Liverpool address. However, by 27 May 1828 his schemes had evidently proven so unsuccessful that he left the Isle of Man for the final time.

By 1830 Ashe had children and was living "in a miserable way with his wife" at 17 King Street, Kensington, London, aged 60. It was from here that Ashe is supposed to have written anonymously to the Duke of Cumberland, blackmailing him with the threat of publishing a damaging book he had written about him unless he received payment. When the Duke refused, another letter was written, on 27 May 1830, "threatening to kill and murder" the Duke. Ashe was arrested when he was found suspiciously loitering outside the Duke's home. He served six months in Coldbath Fields Prison, but a link could not ultimately be established between him or his handwriting and the letters, and so he was acquitted.

On 29 May 1831 Ashe wrote of having had an apparent conversion to Wesleyanism, having visited a chapel in Gosport only to gather material to slander it in a newspaper article. However, this was received with scepticism and derision both by the priest at the chapel and by the Manx press. The suspicion was that this was only another scheme of Ashe's to cheat others out of their money.

Ashe lived another four and a half years after this, dying in Bath at the start of January 1836. The final summation of his life was printed in the Manx Sun as follows: "His whole life was one continual series of struggles with misfortune, and he ended his days in utter destitution and want."
