= Frank the Plumber =

- Shameless episode
- Episode no.: Season 3 Episode 9
- Directed by: Mark Mylod
- Written by: Krista Vernoff
- Cinematography by: Kevin McKnight
- Editing by: Regis Kimble
- Production code: 2J6609
- Original release date: March 17, 2013
- Running time: 56 minutes

Guest appearances
- Joan Cusack as Sheila Jackson; Bradley Whitford as Abraham Paige; Christian Clemenson as Christopher Collier; Matthew Glave as Scott Walker; Mary Mara as Nance; Bernardo de Paula as Beto; Sunkrish Bala as Andy; Bill Brochtrup as Hal; Maile Flanagan as Connie; Pamala Tyson as Civil Service Worker; Jake McDorman as Mike Pratt; Laura Slade Wiggins as Karen Jackson

Episode chronology
← Previous "Where There's a Will"	Next → "Civil Wrongs"
- Shameless season 3

"Frank the Plumber" is the ninth episode of the third season of the American television comedy drama Shameless, an adaptation of the British series of the same name. It is the 33rd overall episode of the series and was written by co-executive producer Krista Vernoff, and directed by executive producer Mark Mylod. It originally aired on Showtime on March 17, 2013.

The series is set on the South Side of Chicago, Illinois, and depicts the poor, dysfunctional family of Frank Gallagher, a neglectful single father of six: Fiona, Phillip, Ian, Debbie, Carl, and Liam. He spends his days drunk, high, or in search of money, while his children need to learn to take care of themselves. In the episode, Frank accidentally becomes a gay rights hero, while Mandy tries to help Lip with his future.

According to Nielsen Media Research, the episode was seen by an estimated 1.67 million household viewers and gained a 0.8 ratings share among adults aged 18–49. The episode received positive reviews from critics, who praised the storylines, humor and ending.

== Plot ==
Fiona (Emmy Rossum) starts working at a marketing department office. While she is instructed to stick to the script provided for the customers, Fiona deviates from the standards and also alarms her co-workers when Veronica (Shanola Hampton) asks for help regarding a possible circumcision for her baby. Her superior, Mike Pratt (Jake McDorman), talks to her about her behavior, but also congratulates her for managing to get more customers to their service.

Frank (William H. Macy) is still living with Christopher (Christian Clemenson), and he decides to try to ask for financial benefits under a domestic partnership program. However, the clerk refuses to accept his request, as Frank has to have lived with Christopher for one year. While walking on the street, Frank notices an electoral candidate for mayor campaigning. Frank interrupts him to complain about the poor service, and goes on a tirade that is broadcast through social media. Frank is soon hailed as a gay rights hero, but Christopher is annoyed by the bullying he is experiencing at his job, prompting him to ask Frank to move out. Jimmy (Justin Chatwin) starts to reconsider his future given his weak salary, and strongly considers going back to medical school. Upon learning that Mickey (Noel Fisher) is marrying Svetlana after impregnating her, Ian (Cameron Monaghan) tries to talk to him, but Mickey brutally beats him instead.

Without telling Fiona, Debbie (Emma Kenney) chooses to skip school to take care of a depressed Sheila (Joan Cusack). Sheila opens up to Debbie about her mental health struggles and feeling betrayed that Karen (Laura Slade Wiggins) revealed this to the Wong family to get Hymie taken away from her. Meanwhile, Lip (Jeremy Allen White) continues his sexual relationship with Karen. Wanting better for Lip's future, Mandy (Emma Greenwell) applies to numerous colleges for Lip, including MIT. When an MIT representative visits Lip at the Gallagher home, Lip agrees to an interview and is asked to write a 250-word essay. The representative is visibly impressed by Lip's intelligence, and an elated Lip decides to mend his relationship with Mandy and break things off with Karen. In turn, Karen leaves a threatening message to Mandy on her phone.

Per Debbie's advice, Sheila tries to reconcile with Karen, apologizing for being absent during Karen's childhood due to her agoraphobia. Karen is tearful over the apology, but before she can respond, she receives a text from Lip to meet him at the park. While crossing the street to meet Lip, Karen is suddenly rammed by Mandy's car and left unconscious in the middle of the street. Meanwhile, a homeless Frank is approached by lobbyist Abraham Paige (Bradley Whitford), who offers him a house and job to become the new face of their gay rights campaign.

== Production ==
=== Development ===
The episode was written by co-executive producer Krista Vernoff, and directed by executive producer Mark Mylod. It was Vernoff's second writing credit, and Mylod's eighth directing credit.

== Reception ==
=== Viewers ===
In its original American broadcast, "Frank the Plumber" was seen by an estimated 1.67 million household viewers with a 0.8 in the 18–49 demographics. This means that 0.8 percent of all households with televisions watched the episode. This was a slight increase in viewership from the previous episode, which was seen by an estimated 1.66 million household viewers with a 0.8 in the 18–49 demographics.

=== Critical reviews ===
"Frank the Plumber" received positive reviews from critics. John Vilanova of Paste gave the episode an 8.9 out of 10 rating and wrote, "Honestly, this was one of my favorite episodes in what has been an admittedly uneven third season for the show. Littered with really well-acted performances, the episode captures actors unpacking major shifts for their characters — catharsis, self-actualization, desperation — in profound ways. The decisions they're making now feel like they have real stakes in the season's endgame; their actions will have real repercussions on the series' direction as it moves out of the idle much of this season has seemed to be stuck in." Vilanova commented positively on the episode's exploration of Sheila and Karen's relationship, and praised Cusack's performance, calling it "[her] finest work this season, a reminder of her nuanced skill."

Joshua Alston of The A.V. Club gave the episode a "B" grade and wrote, "the term "mixed bag" doesn't seem to go far enough in describing how unfocused the season has been; it has delivered some terrific scenes, some smart character progressions and some killer one-liners, but the pleasures it delivers are terribly scattershot. [...] "Frank The Plumber" is the perfect encapsulation of the season. It's packed to the brim with everything that makes the show great and everything that makes it so frustrating." Alston criticized the episode's focus on Frank, writing "does so much freaking time have to be spent on Frank? Even when the Frank portions of an episode don't add up to a lot in terms of actual time spent, because the Shameless writers have worked so hard to make this an ensemble show, anytime there's attention on Frank, I wish it was somewhere else."

David Crow of Den of Geek praised the comedic nature of Frank's storyline, writing "This is a pretty damn clever episode for Shameless. [...] By making a man who has obvious homophobic tendencies become a Gay rights activist for only a free meal and plenty of booze is the kind of comedy gold that makes this show great." Nick McHatton of TV Fanatic gave the episode a 4.5 star rating out of 5; McHatton praised the chemistry between Fiona and Mike, but was critical of Karen's development: "I have no sympathy for her and her self-made plight. I may have actually cheered and raised my hands up when I saw Karen get mowed down by Mandy's car."
