= Where There's a Will (Shameless) =

- Shameless episode
- Episode no.: Season 3 Episode 8
- Directed by: Danny Cannon
- Written by: Davey Holmes
- Cinematography by: Kevin McKnight
- Editing by: Gregg Featherman
- Production code: 2J6608
- Original release date: March 10, 2013
- Running time: 54 minutes

Guest appearances
- Joan Cusack as Sheila Jackson; Christian Clemenson as Christopher Collier; Vanessa Bell Calloway as Carol Fisher; Tyler Jacob Moore as Tony Markovich; Bernardo de Paula as Beto; Josh Perry as Jeremy; Elizabeth Sung as Mrs. Wong; Sunkrish Bala as Andy; Tara Karsian as Celia; Brent Sexton as Patrick Gallagher; Laura Slade Wiggins as Karen Jackson

Episode chronology
← Previous "A Long Way From Home"	Next → "Frank the Plumber"
- Shameless season 3

"Where There's a Will" is the eighth episode of the third season of the American television comedy drama Shameless, an adaptation of the British series of the same name. It is the 32nd overall episode of the series and was written by co-executive producer Davey Holmes, and directed by Danny Cannon. It originally aired on Showtime on March 10, 2013.

The series is set on the South Side of Chicago, Illinois, and depicts the poor, dysfunctional family of Frank Gallagher, a neglectful single father of six: Fiona, Phillip, Ian, Debbie, Carl, and Liam. He spends his days drunk, high, or in search of money, while his children need to learn to take care of themselves. In the episode, as Fiona fights to keep the house, Frank tries to find a new home.

According to Nielsen Media Research, the episode was seen by an estimated 1.66 million household viewers and gained a 0.8 ratings share among adults aged 18–49. The episode received generally positive reviews from critics, who praised the dark humor and performances.

== Plot ==
Although Fiona (Emmy Rossum) has become the legal guardian of her siblings, the Gallaghers still have to face Frank's cousin, Patrick (Brent Sexton), who forged Aunt Ginger's will to get the house for him and his family. Patrick states that he plans to evict them, planning to renovate and flip the house. Running low on funds, Fiona and Jimmy (Justin Chatwin) get new jobs cleaning sewage, but Jimmy dislikes the job due to his unfamiliarity. After getting a new job as a barista, Jimmy runs into an old friend from medical school; they decide to catch up at a restaurant.

Without Hymie in the house and Karen (Laura Slade Wiggins) moving back in, Sheila (Joan Cusack) asks Frank (William H. Macy) to move out. While attending an Alcoholics Anonymous meeting, Frank is approached by Christopher (Christian Clemenson), who is a recovering addict and asks Frank to sponsor him. Frank agrees to help when Christopher allows him to stay at his house. However, Frank soon discovers that Christopher is not a recovering alcoholic, and is just in need of company. Although Frank is uncomfortable with Christopher's lifestyle, he ultimately decides to stay with him due to the lack of options.

Karen's presence causes a rift between Lip (Jeremy Allen White) and Mandy (Emma Greenwell), who is upset that Lip did not inform her of Karen's return. After Mandy moves out of the Gallagher house, Lip visits Karen and the two have sex. After attending a Down syndrome support group, Sheila is inspired to join the "Retard Nation" organization, which aims to help people with disabilities reclaim the slur. Offended by the organization, Mrs. Wong (Elizabeth Sung) threatens to keep Hymie away from Sheila unless she ends her association with the group; Mrs. Wong also reveals that Karen had called the Wong family, asking them to take Hymie away from Sheila. Devastated, Sheila confronts Karen over her actions; Karen admits to doing so, wanting to return to their simpler life before Hymie. Kevin (Steve Howey) and Veronica (Shanola Hampton) continue their attempt at surrogacy with Carol (Vanessa Bell Calloway), but Veronica reaches her breaking point and decides to stop using her mother when she believes Carol is growing attracted to Kevin.

As the Gallaghers debate on what to do with Patrick, Carl (Ethan Cutkosky) shocks the family by deciding to poison Patrick with rat poisoning, almost killing him. After Patrick recovers, Tony (Tyler Jacob Moore) visits Fiona to let her know that Patrick wants them evicted that same day to avoid pressing charges. In order to save their house, Debbie claims that Patrick sexually molested her. Patrick is arrested, but Fiona drops the charges by making him agree to a 50-year lease at $500 per month, down from the $1800 he originally wanted.

== Production ==
=== Development ===
The episode was written by co-executive producer Davey Holmes, and directed by Danny Cannon. It was Holmes' first writing credit, and Cannon's first directing credit.

== Reception ==
=== Viewers ===
In its original American broadcast, "Where There's a Will" was seen by an estimated 1.66 million household viewers with a 0.8 in the 18–49 demographics. This means that 0.8 percent of all households with televisions watched the episode. This was a 6% decrease in viewership from the previous episode, which was seen by an estimated 1.76 million household viewers with a 0.8 in the 18–49 demographics.

=== Critical reviews ===
"Where There's a Will" received highly positive reviews from critics. Joshua Alston of The A.V. Club gave the episode a "B+" grade. Alston, who had been largely critical of Jimmy's character in previous reviews, praised the central storyline between Fiona and Jimmy and said the episode "cements the quietly building tension between Fiona and Jimmy in an effective way, suddenly turning the relationship I once found the least interesting aspect of the show into the one I'm most intrigued by." Alston was mixed over Sheila's subplot, writing "I found the "Retard Nation" story irritating because I didn't find it funny. Shameless can get away with a whole lot when it can back it up with laughs, but they weren't there for me." In contrast, John Vilanova of Paste, who gave the episode a 7.1 out of 10 rating, praised the handling of Sheila's storyline: "This could easily be offensive—and it may be to some—but I found the handling of this plot relatively impressive in its sensitivity to what is a more nuanced conversation. Shameless often (intentionally) struggles with subtlety, but it does often tackle complicated issues like poverty in a way that on the surface seems silly but does get at the complexity of these issues."

David Crow of Den of Geek praised the comedic tone of the episode, writing "Overall, it is a nice return to unapologetic crudeness and light political incorrectness following two heavier episodes. [...] This episode is a nice breath before some big dramatic plunges for our last three shows." Joshua Wagonblast of The Highlander praised the episode's script: "Davey Holmes did a fine job crafting a believable, but still outrageous and comical episode for this week. I am pleased to say that "Shameless" is heading in a nice direction as the season slows to a close." Wagonblast also commented positively on Macy's performance, writing "Macy hits all the right notes as expected and I am compelled to see where this odd storyline will go." Leigh Raines of TV Fanatic gave the episode a 4 star rating out of 5.
