= A Long Way from Home (Shameless) =

- Shameless episode
- Episode no.: Season 3 Episode 7
- Directed by: Mimi Leder
- Written by: Etan Frankel
- Cinematography by: Kevin McKnight
- Editing by: Finnian Murray
- Production code: 2J6607
- Original release date: March 3, 2013
- Running time: 52 minutes

Guest appearances
- Joan Cusack as Sheila Jackson; Ryan Bittle as Steven Redel; Mike Doyle as Lanier; Stephanie Fantauzzi as Estefania; Barry Shabaka Henley as Judge Glen Aufseeser; Juanita Jennings as Mama Kamala; Mary Mara as Nance; Bernardo de Paula as Beto; Elizabeth Sung as Mrs. Wong; Keiko Agena as Brittany Sturgess; Daija Owens as Laronda; David Wells as Father Pete; Laura Slade Wiggins as Karen Jackson

Episode chronology
← Previous "Cascading Failures"	Next → "Where There's a Will"
- Shameless season 3

"A Long Way From Home" is the seventh episode of the third season of the American television comedy drama Shameless, an adaptation of the British series of the same name. It is the 31st overall episode of the series and was written by producer Etan Frankel, and directed by Mimi Leder. It originally aired on Showtime on March 3, 2013.

The series is set on the South Side of Chicago, Illinois, and depicts the poor, dysfunctional family of Frank Gallagher, a neglectful single father of six: Fiona, Phillip, Ian, Debbie, Carl, and Liam. He spends his days drunk, high, or in search of money, while his children need to learn to take care of themselves. In the episode, Frank and Fiona face in court to determine the future of the children.

According to Nielsen Media Research, the episode was seen by an estimated 1.76 million household viewers and gained a 0.8 ratings share among adults aged 18–49. The episode received critical acclaim, who praised the main storyline, writing and performances (particularly Rossum).

== Plot ==
Fiona (Emmy Rossum) prepares to ask a lawyer to help her gain full custody of her siblings, planning to cut ties with Frank (William H. Macy) after discovering he was the anonymous tip. Frank, meanwhile, is planning to appeal to maintain his paternity rights and tries to get sobriety chips to help his case.

Debbie (Emma Kenney) dislikes her new home, as Mama Kamala (Juanita Jennings) makes her work on illegal manual labor along with the other children. One night, she decides to glue her eyes after drugging her with benadryl and runs back home to eat. Lip (Jeremy Allen White) and Mandy (Emma Greenwell) visit Carl (Ethan Cutkosky) and Liam at their home, with Lip asking him to resist his new lifestyle while the case is worked out. Ian (Cameron Monaghan) visits Mickey (Noel Fisher), who is still shaken by the brutal beating that his father gave him; Ian is heartbroken when Mickey chooses to avoid him. Meanwhile, Jimmy (Justin Chatwin) is constantly brought back into Estefania's apartment, as he needs to convince immigration officers of their marriage.

Sheila (Joan Cusack) is disturbed when Jody (Zach McGowan) returns to his sex addiction, as he wants her to perform erotic asphyxiation on him. They are visited by Timmy Wong (Albert Kuo) and his mother, who want to take Hymie to live with them. Despite Jody protesting, Sheila realizes she has an unfit home for a baby and reluctantly decides to give Hymie back to the Wong family. Later, Sheila desperately asks Frank to help her stage an intervention for Jody's sex addiction. Frank and his friend Tommy (Michael Patrick McGill) help Jody understand the consequences of his addiction and convince him in changing for the sake of Sheila; Frank also seizes the opportunity to take Jody's chips to help his case. The following day, Sheila is shocked when Karen (Laura Slade Wiggins) returns; Karen apologizes to her mother for her past actions, and the two reconcile.

To better her chances in court, Fiona forges a will in which Aunt Ginger leaves them with the house, and she forges Monica's signature to sign away her paternity rights. With the help of Veronica (Shanola Hampton), Fiona also gets an unidentified body from the morgue, preventing Frank from cashing more checks. While Frank and Fiona face in court, Lip and Mandy try to file the forged will, but they find out that Patrick, Frank's cousin, has already filed an equally forged will that supersedes theirs. In court, Frank and Fiona both give their respective statements. In his chambers, the Judge tells Fiona that while he is aware of Frank's pathological lies, the lack of evidence prevents him from taking his parental rights. However, he tells Fiona that he will make her a legal guardian, but warns her that taking on the responsibility will greatly affect her future. After considering, Fiona ultimately decides to accept; the kids are allowed to move back home, while Frank is tasked to attend 60 days of Alcoholics Anonymous meetings.

== Production ==
The episode was written by producer Etan Frankel, and directed by Mimi Leder. It was Frankel's fourth writing credit, and Leder's third directing credit.

== Reception ==
=== Viewers ===
In its original American broadcast, "A Long Way From Home" was seen by an estimated 1.76 million household viewers with a 0.8 in the 18–49 demographics. This means that 0.8 percent of all households with televisions watched the episode. This was a 18% increase in viewership from the previous episode, which was seen by an estimated 1.48 million household viewers with a 0.7 in the 18–49 demographics.

=== Critical reviews ===
"A Long Way From Home" received critical acclaim. Joshua Alston of The A.V. Club gave the episode an "A–" grade, calling it "powerful" and "character-driven", and commending the episode's exploration of Frank's relationship with his kids: "This episode represented something of a Frank apologia, toying with the audience's perception of him and how he fits into the family. Really, the entire episode examined the idea of parental choice and the dialectical tension created by the desire to serve such a crucial role in someone's life and the feeling of crushing, all-consuming obligation that comes with it." Alston also praised the performances, commending the "stunning monologues" from Macy and Rossum, as well as Cusack's performance as Sheila: "Cusack had another incredible week here, showing once again how Sheila's unique blend of quirky and sad really makes her a pillar of the show, even as she exists outside of the Gallagher story most of the time."

Alan Sepinwall of HitFix gave a largely positive review, writing "This has been probably the best Shameless season to date. John Wells and company, more than ever have before, have really nailed the balance of sick comedy and gut-punching tragedy, have cast Frank almost entirely as a villain rather than clumsy comic relief, and given us some big stakes for all the characters. This child services/custody mini-arc has been perhaps the best story the show's told so far, packing in so much craziness at the same time it's abundantly clear how scary this situation is for Fiona and all the kids." John Vilanova of Paste gave the episode a 7.6 out of 10 rating and praised Rossum's performance, writing "Emmy Rossum's Fiona is a force of nature in the courtroom as she and Frank battle over the responsibility of custody. Rossum had done a lot of press in advance of this episode and for good reason—she's a riveting presence and I couldn't take my eyes off her."

David Crow of Den of Geek commended Rossum's performance, calling her courthouse monologue as "[her] best moment in the entire series", and concluding "If this Emmy is snubbed again by THE Emmys, they are officially worthless." Leigh Raines of TV Fanatic gave the episode a 4.5 star rating out of 5 and wrote, "After the harrowing situation of watching the Gallagher siblings get carted off by DFS, Fiona decided it was time for her to take matters into her own hands this week. In "A Long Way From Home," she finally took the long-coming step of filing for custody of her younger siblings."

=== Accolades ===
For the episode, Joan Cusack received a nomination for Outstanding Guest Actress in a Drama Series at the 65th Primetime Emmy Awards. She would lose to Carrie Preston for The Good Wife.
