= Shameless season 3 =

Shameless
- Season 3
- DVD cover
- Showrunner: John Wells
- Starring: William H. Macy; Emmy Rossum; Justin Chatwin; Ethan Cutkosky; Shanola Hampton; Steve Howey; Emma Kenney; Cameron Monaghan; Jeremy Allen White; Joan Cusack; Noel Fisher; Emma Greenwell; Zach McGowan
- No. of episodes: 12

Release
- Original network: Showtime
- Original release: January 13 – April 7, 2013

Season chronology
- ← Previous; Season 2 Next → Season 4

The third season of Shameless, an American comedy-drama television series based on the British series of the same name by Paul Abbott, premiered on January 13, 2013, at Sunday 9:00 p.m. EST on the Showtime television network. Executive producers are John Wells, Paul Abbott and Andrew Stearn, with producer Michael Hissrich. The season concluded after 12 episodes on April 7, 2013. The show's season premiere brought in 2 million viewers, becoming the show's highest-rated episode ever to-date. The episode airing February 17, "The Sins of My Caretaker", received 1.31 million total viewers, its lowest-rated episode of the season. The season finale scored 1.82 million viewers.

== Plot ==
Fiona struggles to adapt to life with Jimmy, as he officially moves in with the Gallaghers. Jimmy, however, has more pressing concerns when Estefania's drug lord father, Nando, returns to the United States. Nando kills Marco and forces Jimmy to dismember the body; he also tells Jimmy that he wants him to stay married to Estefania, so Estefania can become an American citizen. Out of fear for his life, Jimmy agrees, but he keeps it a secret from Fiona.

Frank calls Child Protective Services on his own family after being kicked out of his own house once again. When a CPS worker comes for a visitation at a particularly hectic time, the underage kids are forced into separate foster homes, many being less-than-adequate. Though Veronica and Kevin attempt to foster the kids, Fiona ultimately gets Frank to clean up for their foster worker. When Fiona finds out Frank is the one who called CPS, Fiona fights for custody of the children against Frank, and is declared their legal guardian. This is bad news for Jimmy, who had plans to go to medical school in Michigan. Though Fiona, albeit shocked, is initially supportive, she is enraged to find out Jimmy had applied for a studio apartment only. After she and Jimmy get into a nasty argument over their relationship, Fiona breaks up with him.

Ian continues his relationship with Mickey, and their relationship continues to grow in the first half of the season. After the Gallagher children are put into foster homes, Mickey invites Ian to stay with him while his father, Terry, is out of town. However, Terry comes home early and unexpectedly walks in on them having sex. Terry—who is abusive and homophobic—beats the two boys at gunpoint and forces Mickey to have sex with a Russian prostitute, Svetlana; Mickey is thereby damaged and refuses to communicate with Ian. To Ian's dismay, Mickey marries Svetlana, who has become pregnant with his child. Meanwhile, Mandy and Lip are together, though Lip begins feeling smothered by Mandy when she becomes more involved in his life. Worried that Lip will throw away his future, Mandy secretly applies Lip for several colleges, and a successful interview gives Lip a chance at MIT. Lip is at first angry about this but later thanks Mandy for her help. Kevin and Veronica continue their quest to have a baby, but there is little chance of Veronica getting pregnant; Veronica asks her mother to be their surrogate.

Family troubles are not limited to the Gallaghers: Sheila is struggling to deal with parental life, and her problems are further compounded when Jody relapses in his sex addiction. Sheila desperately lets Frank offer his support with Hymie, which leaves him with a temporary home. When Timmy Wong's family want Hymie to live with them, Sheila reluctantly obliges, realizing that her home is an unsuitable environment to raise a baby. Later the next day, Karen returns home. Sheila is overjoyed by Karen's return, but after speaking with Timmy Wong's mother, Sheila discovers that Karen had previously called the Wong family to take Hymie away from her and Jody. Heartbroken by her daughter's actions, Sheila becomes depressed. Meanwhile, Karen briefly rekindles her sexual relationship with Lip, but Lip decides against pursuing their relationship in favor of Mandy. When Karen threatens Mandy through a phone call, Mandy vengefully runs over Karen with her car, which leaves Karen with possibly permanent deficiencies. Lip, upset over Karen's vegetative state, angrily breaks up with Mandy. To give Karen a better recovery, Jody and Sheila break up, and Jody leaves town with Karen and Hymie to Arizona.

The final episodes of the third season, while still comedic, begins to shift into a darker tone. Frank is diagnosed with liver failure and is advised to stop drinking or he will die. Fiona visits Frank in the hospital and tries to convince him to stop drinking for either himself or his kids, but he refuses. Depressed from Mickey's marriage, Ian enlists in the Army without the knowledge of his family, only revealing the news to a shocked Mickey. He leaves secretly the next morning, forging identification using Lip's ID. Meanwhile, Estefania is deported due to Jimmy's neglectfulness. Nando orders Jimmy to board a yacht to an unknown location, presumably for Jimmy to be murdered. Fiona begins a temp job at Worldwide Cup, and she sends a final voicemail to Jimmy's phone signalling that she is over him.

== Cast and characters ==
=== Regular ===
- William H. Macy as Frank Gallagher
- Emmy Rossum as Fiona Gallagher
- Justin Chatwin as Steve Wilton / Jimmy Lishman
- Ethan Cutkosky as Carl Gallagher
- Shanola Hampton as Veronica "V" Fisher
- Steve Howey as Kevin "Kev" Ball
- Emma Kenney as Debbie Gallagher
- Cameron Monaghan as Ian Gallagher
- Jeremy Allen White as Philip "Lip" Gallagher
- Noel Fisher as Mickey Milkovich
- Emma Greenwell as Mandy Milkovich
- Zach McGowan as Jody Silverman

=== Special guest stars ===
- Joan Cusack as Sheila Jackson

=== Special guest ===
- Bradley Whitford as Abraham Paige

=== Recurring ===
- Laura Slade Wiggins as Karen Jackson
- Jake McDorman as Michael "Mike" Pratt
- Michael Patrick McGill as Tommy
- Dennis Cockrum as Terry Milkovich
- Kerry O'Malley as Kate
- Stephanie Fantauzzi as Estefania
- Joanna Lee as Hiram "Hymie" Jackson
- Harry Hamlin as Lloyd 'Ned' Lishman
- Ed Lauter as Dick Healey
- Bernardo de Paula as Beto
- Eric Edelstein as Bobby Mallison
- Keiko Agena as Brittany Sturgess
- Isidora Goreshter as Svetlana Yevgenivna
- Sunkrish Bala as Andy
- Bill Brochtrup as Hal
- Maile Flanagan as Connie
- Vanessa Bell Calloway as Carol Fisher

=== Guests ===
- Jim Hoffmaster as Kermit
- Nicky Korba as Little Hank
- J. Michael Trautmann as Iggy Milkovich
- Sheldon Bailey as Kenyatta
- Alex Borstein as Lou Deckner
- Julia Duffy as Candace Lishman
- David Wells as Father Pete
- Diora Baird as Meg
- Thierre Di Castro Garrito as Marco
- Pepê Rapazote (Pedro M. Fernandes) as Nando
- Cameron Richardson as Cheryl
- Justine Lupe as Blake Collins
- Madison Rothschild as Molly Milkovich
- Ellen Gerstein as Aunt Rande
- Juanita Jennings as Mama Kamala
- Chris Butler as Cassius
- Mike Doyle as Lanier
- Daija Owens as Laronda
- Christian Clemenson as Christopher Collier
- Tyler Jacob Moore as Tony Markovich
- Brent Sexton as Patrick Gallagher

== Episodes ==
No. overall	No. in season	Title	Directed by	Written by	Original release date	Prod. code	US viewers (millions)
25	1	"El Gran Cañon"	Mark Mylod	John Wells	January 13, 2013	2J6601	2.00
Fiona tries to adapt to living with Jimmy after he moves in with her. Jimmy is dealing with the sudden appearance of Nando, Estefania's father, who kills Marco in front of Jimmy and Estefania; Jimmy is then forced to help dismember Marco's body and dispose of it on a boat in the Great Lakes. Nando wants Jimmy to stay married to Estefania so she can become an American citizen. Frank wakes up in Mexico but is turned away at the border due to a lack of papers. He turns to being a drug mule to get through. Mandy unofficially moves into the Gallagher home; Fiona wants to know if Lip is being responsible about sex. Ian continues to meet up and have sex with Jimmy's father, Lloyd. Lip, Ian, Carl, and Mandy compete in a robot fighting competition. They win and put the $400 cash prize towards the past due property tax but, unbeknownst to anyone else, Fiona has put $1,000 down on an upcoming night at the club to be the club's promoter.
26	2	"The American Dream"	Anthony Hemingway	Nancy M. Pimental	January 20, 2013	2J6602	1.37
Fiona faces new challenges as a party promoter, and she ends up losing $100 for the night. Fiona discovers that she only did fairly well because Lip had conned rich kids into coming to the club for a fake concert. Nando has assigned Beto to watch over Jimmy's every move. Lip's teachers and Mandy encourage Lip to prepare his resumé and application for college. Frank staggers home and clashes with the rest of the Gallaghers due to his drunken antics. Debbie, who has shown Frank much kindness and love, is enraged when Frank ignorantly breaks her art project and doesn't care; Debbie snaps and hits Frank with a blunt object. An enraged Frank anonymously calls CPS on his own family. Sheila and Jody, struggling with parental life, desperately let Frank move in when he is able to quiet the baby Hymie. Ian deals with the return of Mickey, and tries to figure out if they're in a relationship. Veronica gets a visit from a woman who claims to be Kevin's wife.
27	3	"May I Trim Your Hedges?"	Steve Shill	Krista Vernoff	January 27, 2013	2J6603	1.99
Fiona applies for a job at a grocery store, but the store manager makes sexual advances towards her. Veronica uses a hidden camera to catch the manager's inappropriate behavior and blackmail him into giving Fiona the job. Frank tries to use Hymie to scam a children's foundation for an autographed basketball to sell. When he discovers that the foundation is for children with cancer, Frank convinces Carl that he might be dying from cancer. Kevin's wife, Cheryl, is trying to get him back by pretending her sister's child is hers and his. When Veronica finds out, she fights with Cheryl and forces her to sign the divorce papers. After Debbie witnesses a man masturbating to her on the subway, Lip leads a crusade to take down sex offenders in the neighborhood. Jimmy spends time with Estefania creating false wedding photos in order to protect her from immigration services. Estefania initiates a sexual encounter with Jimmy. Ian is confused when Mickey sleeps with a neighborhood girl. Mickey later discovers Ian and Lloyd's relationship, leading Mickey to attack Lloyd.
28	4	"The Helpful Gallaghers"	Randall Einhorn	Mike O'Malley	February 10, 2013	2J6604	1.53
Mandy receives a call from her younger half-sister Molly, whose mother had recently died. Lip convinces Mandy to retrieve Molly in Milwaukee in order to save her from the foster care system. The Gallaghers find out that Molly is actually a boy, but was raised as a girl. Carl heads off to cancer camp, where the restrictions on the camp's activities frustrate Carl and the kids. Debbie works on holding her breath longer underwater. Sheila asks Frank for advice to get Jody to use her fetish toys; Frank reluctantly agrees to be Jody's sex coach. Fiona gathers her female co-workers to protest the boss's sexual advances towards them, but the women vote to keep it as is because of their employee benefits. Jimmy learns that his parents are getting a divorce, and that his father was kicked out. When he brings Lloyd to spend the night at the Gallagher home, Lloyd gets in bed with Lip, whom he mistakes for Ian. Ian is forced to reveal his relationship with Lloyd, forcing Jimmy to deal with his father's sexuality.
29	5	"The Sins of My Caretaker"	J. Michael Muro	Sheila Callaghan	February 17, 2013	2J6605	1.31
A city employee notifies Fiona that the city will be doing sewer line work in the backyard, but Aunt Ginger is still buried in the backyard; Fiona makes Frank dig for the body before the city starts doing work. Jimmy is still struggling to deal with his father's true sexuality, and he turns to Estefania for emotional support after arguing with Fiona. Lloyd asks Ian to rob his house to get back his personal belongings; Ian recruits Mickey and his cousins for the job. Fiona deals with the animosity of her co-workers over not giving in to the sexual advances of the boss. Veronica finds out she is infertile, and she approaches her mother, Carol, about being a surrogate. Lip has second thoughts about his relationship with Mandy. Fiona informs Molly of his real gender. Debbie retaliates against her bully at the local pool by attempting to drown her. Sheila takes in a terminally ill nun who has taken a vow of silence, but later discovers that the nun has blogged about Jody's sex addiction online. The Gallaghers receive a visit from Child Protective Services.
30	6	"Cascading Failures"	Anthony Hemingway	Alex Borstein	February 24, 2013	2J6606	1.48
Fiona and Jimmy try to get the kids back after they are taken away by Child Protective Services: Lip and Ian are sent to a group home for delinquents, Carl and Liam are taken in by a wealthy gay couple, and Debbie is forced to do errands by her threatening foster mother. Fiona ultimately gets Frank to agree to clean up and petition for their return, and she quits her job at the grocery store when the manager refuses to let her off to find the kids. As the petition for custody requires signatures from both parents, Fiona gets Sheila to pose as Monica for the petition. Terry Milkovich discovers Ian and Mickey having sex; Terry beats them both and forces Mickey to have sex with a prostitute, Svetlana, while forcing Ian to watch at gunpoint. Veronica suggests Kevin should have sex with Carol, as the artificial insemination isn't working. Although disgusted, Carol and Kevin hesitantly agree. Fiona visits the family's case manager, who tentatively lets her listen to the anonymous phone call to CPS; Fiona finds out that Frank was the one who called in the CPS report.
31	7	"A Long Way From Home"	Mimi Leder	Etan Frankel	March 3, 2013	2J6607	1.76
Fiona prepares for her court hearing, having decided to attempt to get full custody of the children. To better her chances, Fiona forges a will in which Aunt Ginger leaves them with the house. Frank cleans up his antics in preparation for court. Jimmy deals with a sudden visitation by immigration. Sheila receives a visit from Timmy Wong and his mother, who want to take Hymie to live with them. With Jody relapsing in his sex addiction, Sheila realizes she has an unfit home and decides to give Hymie back to the Wong family. The next day, Karen returns home and reunites with Sheila and Jody. Debbie runs away from her foster home after having to do illegal manual labor along with the other children. After the incident with Terry, Mickey avoids Ian. Fiona finally faces Frank in court; the judge continues Frank's parental rights, but declares Fiona the other legal guardian of the children. Lip and Mandy try to file the forged will, but find out that Patrick Gallagher has already filed an equally forged will that supersedes theirs.
32	8	"Where There's a Will"	Danny Cannon	Davey Holmes	March 10, 2013	2J6608	1.66
The Gallaghers try to fight back on keeping the home against their cousin Patrick. Fiona and Jimmy start their new jobs. With Hymie back with his biological family, Sheila kicks Frank out. Frank becomes the sponsor of an eccentric AA member, Christopher, so he can have a place to stay. Karen instigates a fight between Mandy and Lip. After Mandy moves out of the Gallagher home, Lip visits Karen and they have sex. Meanwhile, Sheila learns that Karen had called the Wong family in order for them to take Hymie. Sheila later confronts Karen, who claims that she wanted to return to a simpler time before Hymie. Veronica and Kevin continue their baby-making quest as Carol begins turning up the romance. When Patrick brings the police to evict the Gallaghers, Debbie claims that Patrick had sexually molested her. Patrick is subsequently arrested, and Fiona negotiates for a 50-year lease at $500 per month, down from the $1800 he originally wanted.
33	9	"Frank the Plumber"	Mark Mylod	Krista Vernoff	March 17, 2013	2J6609	1.67
Fiona starts a new office job and struggles with corporate culture, while Jimmy considers returning to medical school. Frank gets the idea of trying to get financial benefits under a domestic partnership program. When he's turned down, Frank unknowingly starts a city campaign for gay rights and becomes a local celebrity. Christopher dislikes all the publicity and makes Frank move out. Mandy secretly applies to colleges for Lip. After a possibly successful interview with MIT, Lip breaks things off with Karen, who leaves a threatening message to Mandy on her phone. Ian is upset when he finds out that Mickey is getting married. Debbie skips school to spend the day with Sheila, who is depressed from Karen's actions. Realizing she needs to reconcile with her daughter, Sheila apologizes to Karen for her previous mental illness issues. Before she can respond, Karen gets a text message from Lip to "meet [him] at the park." While walking to the park, Karen is run over by Mandy's car.
34	10	"Civil Wrongs"	Gary B. Goldman	Mike O'Malley	March 24, 2013	2J6610	1.61
As Fiona continues her new office job, Jimmy breaks the news to her about returning to medical school. He also tells the news to Beto, who states it'll be difficult to get Estefania to move with him. Frank continues his newfound fame as a gay rights spokesperson, and he attracts an anti-gay rights group that wants to "rid" Frank of his homosexuality by giving him women to have sex with. With that promise, and receiving twice the pay and a better hotel, Frank scams both groups but is eventually caught. Lip visits a coma-induced Karen in the hospital. He finds out from Sheila about the text message sent from his phone, and he realizes that it was Mandy who sent the text. Sheila and Jody break up at the hospital, and Jody gets Karen to wake from her coma by performing oral sex on her. Ian finds out that Mickey is marrying Svetlana. Veronica and Kevin find out that Carol is pregnant. Jimmy confronts Fiona about coming with him to Michigan so he can complete medical school.
35	11	"Order Room Service"	Sanaa Hamri	Sheila Callaghan	March 31, 2013	2J6611	1.65
Fiona contemplates finding another job so she can move to Michigan with Jimmy, but the two get into an argument when she discovers that Jimmy had only rented a studio apartment; Fiona tells him to find another place to sleep. Carl lets Frank stay in the old family van. They bond over Frank's childhood story of theft, which inspires Carl to steal belongings from his former foster parents. The police arrive to arrest Carl, but Frank—in an uncharacteristic gesture—takes the blame and is arrested. Ian tries to convince Mickey to not marry Svetlana; the two share an intimate moment, but Mickey ultimately decides to go through with the wedding. Ian drinks excessively and reveals to Mandy about his relationship with Mickey. Lip visits Karen, who has been released from the hospital. Angry over witnessing Karen's deficiencies, Lip crashes Mickey's wedding and breaks up with Mandy. Fiona attends a camping trip with her boss, Mike, who she nearly has sex with. Jimmy gets a surprise visit from Nando, who informs him that Estefania is being deported by immigration. Jimmy, fearing for his life, is forced to board a yacht to an unknown location.
36	12	"Survival of the Fittest"	Mark Mylod	Etan Frankel & Nancy M. Pimental	April 7, 2013	2J6612	1.82
Frank wakes up in jail after being arrested, but he is sent to the hospital after fainting. Frank is told that he has liver failure and is advised to stop drinking; Frank ignores this advice and drinks with Lip to celebrate his high school graduation. After vomiting blood at a skating rink, Frank is sent back to the hospital. Fiona visits Frank and tries to convince him to stop drinking for either himself or his kids, but he refuses. Sheila says goodbye to Jody, Karen, and Hymie as they leave for Arizona. Fiona assumes that Jimmy is avoiding her, and becomes distraught over his whereabouts. She is confronted by Beto, who delivers her money that he claims is from Jimmy. Unbeknownst to his siblings, Ian enlists in the Army, and he visits Mickey one last time to tell him about his enlistment. The news leaves Mickey shocked and emotional; Mickey displays his love with one word, "Don't". Ian departs quietly the next morning with Lip's ID. Fiona is promoted in her new job. Lip thanks Mandy for her help with getting into college. Frank sneaks out of the hospital and walks the streets alone.

== Development and production ==
On February 1, 2012, Showtime announced the series would be renewed for a third season. The show's third season began shooting on June 27, 2012 and premiered on Sunday, January 13, 2013.

== Casting ==
Noel Fisher, Emma Greenwell and Zach McGowan were promoted to series regulars for their roles as Mickey Milkovich, Mandy Milkovich and Jody Silverman respectively. Laura Slade Wiggins was demoted to a recurring character for her role as Karen Jackson, after her character left in the second season's finale. Wiggins' character returns mid-way through the third season, in the episode "A Long Way From Home". Stephanie Fantauzzi, Vanessa Bell Calloway, and Tyler Jacob Moore return as recurring characters for their roles as Estefania, Carol Fisher, and Tony Markovich.

== Reception ==
Review aggregator Rotten Tomatoes gives the third season a 92%, based on 13 reviews. The critics consensus reads, "Shameless divvies up a spoil of riches among its impoverished ensemble, further fleshing out all members of the Gallagher clan in surprising ways."

== DVD release ==
The Complete Third Season
Set details		Special features
12 episodes; 650 minutes (Region 1); 624 minutes (Region 4); 3-disc set; 1.77:1 aspect ratio; Languages: English (Dolby Digital 2.0 Surround); Subtitles: English, and French (Region 1); English, Spanish, Danish, French, Dutch, Finnish, Norwegian, Swedish, English and German for the Hearing Impaired (Regions 2 and 4)		Where the Streets Have No Shame – (featurette) Go behind the scenes with the Shameless cast and crew as they prep a number of sets and streets for the third season shoot.; The Many Sides of Sheila – (featurette) Joan Cusack's character Sheila steps center stage as the actress, writer Mike O'Malley and other key members of the team discuss her development and evolution.; An Officer and a Gallagher – (featurette) The same treatment is given to Cameron Monaghan's Ian.; A Lip Off the Old Block – (featurette) Followed by Jeremy Allen White's Phillip.; Being Milkovich – (featurette) More character dissections with Noel Fisher and Emma Greenwell.; A Messy Triangle – (featurette) Lip, Karen and Mandy's... relationship.; Deleted Scenes – A small selection of deleted scenes of the series.; Episodes: 2, 3, 5, 8, 12, 13, 14, 16, 19
Release dates
United States	Australia	
December 17, 2013	December 18, 2013	
