= Civil Wrongs =

- Shameless episode
- Episode no.: Season 3 Episode 10
- Directed by: Gary B. Goldman
- Written by: Mike O'Malley
- Cinematography by: Kevin McKnight
- Editing by: Finnian Murray
- Production code: 2J6610
- Original release date: March 24, 2013
- Running time: 51 minutes

Guest appearances
- Joan Cusack as Sheila Jackson; Bradley Whitford as Abraham Paige; Jake McDorman as Mike Pratt; Vanessa Bell Calloway as Carol Fisher; Dan Donohue as Alistair Huddleston; Lisa Long as Scotty; Bernardo de Paula as Beto; E. J. Bonilla as Jesus; Bill Brochtrup as Hal; Jake Dogias as Young Doctor; Maile Flanagan as Connie; Laura Slade Wiggins as Karen Jackson

Episode chronology
← Previous "Frank the Plumber"	Next → "Order Room Service"
- Shameless season 3

"Civil Wrongs" is the tenth episode of the third season of the American television comedy drama Shameless, an adaptation of the British series of the same name. It is the 34th overall episode of the series and was written by consulting producer Mike O'Malley, and directed by Gary B. Goldman. It originally aired on Showtime on March 24, 2013.

The series is set on the South Side of Chicago, Illinois, and depicts the poor, dysfunctional family of Frank Gallagher, a neglectful single father of six: Fiona, Phillip, Ian, Debbie, Carl, and Liam. He spends his days drunk, high, or in search of money, while his children need to learn to take care of themselves. In the episode, Frank is approached by a conversion therapist, while Jimmy seriously considers his education.

According to Nielsen Media Research, the episode was seen by an estimated 1.61 million household viewers and gained a 0.8 ratings share among adults aged 18–49. The episode received positive reviews from critics, who praised the dark humor and character development in the episode.

== Plot ==
As part of his new job, Frank (William H. Macy) gives inspirational speeches to support gay rights, with Paige (Bradley Whitford) providing him with luxurious hotels, although Frank still wishes for more service. Frank is later approached by Alistair Huddleston (Dan Donohue), a conversion therapist who wants to "cure" Frank's homosexuality. Frank accepts his offer, because he is being paid twice the amount and getting a better hotel room.

Lip (Jeremy Allen White) is worried over Karen (Laura Slade Wiggins), who has survived the accident and is recovering in a coma. Sheila (Joan Cusack) and Jody (Zach McGowan) stay with Karen at the hospital, where they are told the severity of her trauma; the doctors are unclear if Karen will ever wake up. Jimmy (Justin Chatwin) talks with Beto (Bernardo de Paula) over possibly leaving for medical school in Michigan, as he is just two semesters away from getting his degree. Beto is not thrilled with the news, reminding him that it'll be difficult to get Estefania (Stephanie Fantauzzi) to move with him. When Jimmy expresses his feelings to Fiona (Emmy Rossum), she is supportive but hesitant when Jimmy suggests she accompany him to Michigan. While continuing the progress of having a baby, Kevin (Steve Howey) and Veronica (Shanola Hampton) are delighted when Carol (Vanessa Bell Calloway) reveals she is finally pregnant with Kevin's baby.

During another visit, Lip is told by Sheila about his text message to Karen; Lip believes that Mandy (Emma Greenwell) sent the text, but decides not to confront her about it. When Karen's prospects do not look great, Sheila and Jody decide to end their relationship, as Sheila believes Jody belongs with Karen. Noticing that Karen's heartbeat increases when touching her knee, Jody manages to wake Karen up from her coma by performing oral sex on her. As part of the conversion therapy, Frank has sex with a woman hoping to change her sexuality, while also avoiding Paige's phone calls. However, a gay hotel employee overhears him explaining his scam to the woman, and he calls Paige to visit Frank at his hotel. To prove he is gay, Paige makes Frank have sex with two men.

== Production ==
=== Development ===
The episode was written by consulting producer Mike O'Malley, and directed by Gary B. Goldman. It was O'Malley's fifth writing credit, and Goldman's first directing credit.

== Reception ==
=== Viewers ===
In its original American broadcast, "Civil Wrongs" was seen by an estimated 1.61 million household viewers with a 0.8 in the 18–49 demographics. This means that 0.8 percent of all households with televisions watched the episode. This was a 4% decrease in viewership from the previous episode, which was seen by an estimated 1.67 million household viewers with a 0.8 in the 18–49 demographics.

=== Critical reviews ===
"Civil Wrongs" received positive reviews from critics. Alan Sepinwall of HitFix commented on the lighter tone of the episode, writing "After the emotional fireworks of the custody battle, I think it makes sense for the show to move in a lighter direction for a bit. There's always going to be a tonal back and forth on the show, but the comic highs and dramatic lows remain in equilibrium." Sepinwall particularly praised Macy's performance and the comedic elements of Frank's storyline: "Frank becoming a high-paid pawn in the war between gay marriage advocates and conversion therapy believers has perhaps been my favorite Frank story ever; certainly, it's the first time I've found him as funny as I think the show wants me to. (It helps here that his victims aren't the members of his own family, but Frank's gift for oratory has also played to William H. Macy's strengths.)"

Joshua Alston of The A.V. Club gave the episode a "B" grade and praised the writing, crediting the episode's writer Mike O'Malley for the perfect balance of shock humor and drama: "I'm ready to declare O'Malley this show's MVP. He seems to have a precise understanding of the show's voice that elevates any episode he writes. [...] There's something about the way he integrates the show's elements that always feels incredibly balanced and confident." However, Alston disliked the ending of Jody performing oral sex on an unconscious Karen, criticizing the storyline's absence of consent and finding it unfunny: "I don't like the idea of the joke. I don't like the idea that a woman could be brought out of a coma by being sexually stimulated, even when the woman is Karen, a character we've seen be less than judicious about her sexual exploits." John Vilanova of Paste was largely mixed in his review. Vilanova disliked Frank's storyline, saying it has "quickly lost steam", and criticized the pacing of the episode: "After the show seemed to be building serious momentum last week, things feel like they've stalled a little here because, honestly, not that much happens." Vilanova ultimately gave the episode a 6.9 out of 10 rating, further concluding "in what has been an unfortunate theme all season, the show's only consistent thread has been its inconsistency."

David Crow of Den of Geek was intrigued by the humanization of Karen's character: "Karen is an interesting creation for the American version of Shameless. Like many antagonists on cable television, she is written far nastier and crueler than anything you can find on the networks. [...] After spending all of Season 2 convincing us that she is a textbook sociopath with narcissistic tendencies, the writers are humanizing her after the fact." Nick McHatton of TV Fanatic gave the episode a 4 star rating out of 5 and wrote, "It seems incredible that a bum like Frank Gallagher could become such an important pawn in the war between gay marriage activists and conversion therapy believers. However "Civil Wrongs" proved that even guys like Frank can have an impact."
