= Survival of the Fittest (Shameless) =

- Shameless episode
- Episode no.: Season 3 Episode 12
- Directed by: Mark Mylod
- Written by: Etan Frankel; Nancy M. Pimental
- Cinematography by: Kevin McKnight
- Editing by: Regis Kimble
- Production code: 2J6612
- Original release date: April 7, 2013
- Running time: 57 minutes

Guest appearances
- Joan Cusack as Sheila Jackson; Harry Hamlin as Lloyd Lishman; Vanessa Bell Calloway as Carol Fisher; Ed Lauter as Dick Healey; Bernardo de Paula as Beto; Bill Brochtrup as Hal; Yorgo Constantine as Dr. Markman; Maile Flanagan as Connie; Juan Pope as Sergeant Brown; Marcello Thedford as Julius; Jake McDorman as Mike Pratt; Laura Slade Wiggins as Karen Jackson

Episode chronology
← Previous "Order Room Service"	Next → "Simple Pleasures"
- Shameless season 3

"Survival of the Fittest" is the twelfth episode and season finale of the third season of the American television comedy drama Shameless, an adaptation of the British series of the same name. It is the 36th overall episode of the series and was written by producer Etan Frankel and co-executive producer Nancy M. Pimental, and directed by executive producer Mark Mylod. It originally aired on Showtime on April 7, 2013.

The series is set on the South Side of Chicago, Illinois, and depicts the poor, dysfunctional family of Frank Gallagher, a neglectful single father of six: Fiona, Phillip, Ian, Debbie, Carl, and Liam. He spends his days drunk, high, or in search of money, while his children need to learn to take care of themselves. In the episode, Frank is given a critical medical diagnosis, while Fiona tries to find Jimmy. The episode marked the final appearance of Laura Slade Wiggins and Zach McGowan in the series.

According to Nielsen Media Research, the episode was seen by an estimated 1.82 million household viewers and gained a 0.9 ratings share among adults aged 18–49. The episode received critical acclaim, who praised the episode's serious tone, performances and writing.

== Plot ==
In his jail cell, Frank (William H. Macy) suddenly collapses. He is taken to the prison's infirmary, where a doctor diagnoses him with a liver failure, and warns him to stop drinking. As the prison does not want to be responsible for his treatment, Frank is allowed to be released. Despite the doctor's warning, Frank goes to the Alibi Room to drink.

Lip (Jeremy Allen White) is preparing to graduate from high school, although he is not interested in his family's planned surprise party. He goes to the Alibi, running into Frank. As they converse, they make a bet that Frank can do the most push-ups compared to the other bar patrons. Frank wins the bet, and he decides to invite Lip to a restaurant to celebrate his graduation. Fiona (Emmy Rossum) is getting nervous over Jimmy's whereabouts, as he has not answered a single phone call. She meets with Lloyd (Harry Hamlin) for help, and he suggests Jimmy fled from his life. Later, she is approached by Beto (Bernardo de Paula), who gives her money and tells her to move on from Jimmy. Sheila (Joan Cusack) bids farewell to Karen (Laura Slade Wiggins), Jody (Zach McGowan) and Hymie, who are leaving for a new life in Arizona to help Karen recover.

Without informing his family, Ian (Cameron Monaghan) decides to enlist in the army, despite still being underage. While visiting Mandy (Emma Greenwell), Ian informs Mickey (Noel Fisher) about his plans. Mickey claims he does not care, but as Ian leaves, he says "Don't" in an emotional tone. After Ian leaves, Mandy calls her brother a coward for not opening up about his feelings. While skating at an ice rink, Lip vomits alcohol. However, Frank vomits blood and is taken to the hospital. Fiona visits him, banning Debbie (Emma Kenney) and Carl (Ethan Cutkosky) from entering the room. After getting Lip to leave, Fiona scolds Frank and asks him to stop drinking for the sake of his children, but Frank rebuffs her.

Realizing Jimmy is not going to return, Fiona finally admits to Debbie that she will stay in Chicago. The Gallaghers throw a party to celebrate Lip's graduation; Carl leaves the party and meets with Frank at the hospital, shaving his head as he believes this cured his "cancer". The following day, Frank walks out of the hospital and walks the streets just as it begins to snow. Ian leaves for the army, having created a false ID with Lip's. Lip visits Mandy to tell her he has been admitted in MIT and thanks her for supporting him. Fiona convinces Mike (Jake McDorman) in giving her a sales position at Worldwide Cup. When she returns home, she leaves one final message for Jimmy, telling him goodbye and cutting all ties.

== Production ==
=== Development ===
The episode was written by producer Etan Frankel and co-executive producer Nancy M. Pimental, and directed by executive producer Mark Mylod. It was Frankel's fifth writing credit, Pimental's eighth writing credit, and Mylod's ninth directing credit.

== Reception ==
=== Viewers ===
In its original American broadcast, "Survival of the Fittest" was seen by an estimated 1.82 million household viewers with a 0.9 in the 18–49 demographics. This means that 0.9 percent of all households with televisions watched the episode. This was a 10% increase in viewership from the previous episode, which was seen by an estimated 1.65 million household viewers with a 0.8 in the 18–49 demographics.

=== Critical reviews ===
"Survival of the Fittest" received critical acclaim. Joshua Alston of The A.V. Club gave the episode an "A" grade and wrote, "Sure enough, "Survival Of The Fittest" made me feel this small, delivering another impressive episode right on the heels of "Order Room Service", one of the season's best. It is, at least, the finest finale Shameless has ever delivered, closing some loops while leaving others open in interesting ways and providing well-earned character moments. I'd even go so far as to say it's one of those season finales that could, if absolutely necessary, serve as a series finale." Alston praised the performances, particularly Rossum and Cusack; Alston considered Cusack the "season MVP" and wrote, "[Cusack] absolutely slaughtered that goodbye scene with Jody and Karen, and has consistently delivered throughout. I was conflicted about the way Cusack chose to play Sheila initially, but she's managed to make a potentially cartoonish character real and relatable."

Alan Sepinwall's review for HitFix was highly positive, praising the storylines and Rossum and Macy's performance: "The Fiona/Frank scene at the hospital was as outstanding as you might expect, given the material and the presence of Rossum and William H. Macy." Sepinwall commended the third season as a whole, writing "Overall, this was the most consistent, and probably best, of the three American "Shameless" seasons so far, even if it feels like the season emotionally peaked back during the custody battle arc. [...] It'll be a while til we know how hard, if at all, the writing staff intends to press the reset button, or if we're really heading for a kind of "Shameless 2.0." But this was 12 weeks of outstanding television that just concluded."

Commenting on the tone of the episode, David Crow of Den of Geek wrote, "It is strange that for a show called Shameless, the series chose to end its third season in such a quiet, dignified manner last night. Compared to last season, where the finale exploded from the wrathful carnage of Hurricane Monica, this week took a small bow." Crow commended Macy and Rossum's performance: "When Fiona confronts Frank with the hard truths, we have some of the finest acting that either has done. Between this episode and "A Long Way From Home," it will be a crime if and when Emmy Rossum and William H. Macy are overlooked for Emmy Award recognition again."

Nick McHatton of TV Fanatic gave the episode a 4.5 star rating out of 5, and wrote, "At times Shameless Season 3 has been up and down in terms of story and direction, but "Survival of the Fittest" put past concerns to bed with a superb, and emotional, finale."
