= Order Room Service =

- Shameless episode
- Episode no.: Season 3 Episode 11
- Directed by: Sanaa Hamri
- Written by: Sheila Callaghan
- Cinematography by: Kevin McKnight
- Editing by: Gregg Featherman
- Production code: 2J6611
- Original release date: March 31, 2013
- Running time: 54 minutes

Guest appearances
- Joan Cusack as Sheila Jackson; Jake McDorman as Mike Pratt; Stephanie Fantauzzi as Estefania; Bernardo de Paula as Beto; Pepê Rapazote as Nando; Sunkrish Bala as Andy; Dennis Cockrum as Terry Milkovich; Isidora Goreshter as Svetlana; Laura Slade Wiggins as Karen Jackson

Episode chronology
← Previous "Civil Wrongs"	Next → "Survival of the Fittest"
- Shameless season 3

"Order Room Service" is the eleventh episode of the third season of the American television comedy drama Shameless, an adaptation of the British series of the same name. It is the 35th overall episode of the series and was written by co-producer Sheila Callaghan, and directed by Sanaa Hamri. It originally aired on Showtime on March 31, 2013.

The series is set on the South Side of Chicago, Illinois, and depicts the poor, dysfunctional family of Frank Gallagher, a neglectful single father of six: Fiona, Phillip, Ian, Debbie, Carl, and Liam. He spends his days drunk, high, or in search of money, while his children need to learn to take care of themselves. In the episode, Frank and Carl decide to rob the latter's foster house, while Lip questions Mandy's actions in Karen's accident.

According to Nielsen Media Research, the episode was seen by an estimated 1.65 million household viewers and gained a 0.8 ratings share among adults aged 18–49. The episode received critical acclaim, who praised the storylines, performances, writing, character development and emotional tone.

== Plot ==
Lip (Jeremy Allen White) is still shaken over Mandy (Emma Greenwell) sending the text to Karen (Laura Slade Wiggins), and he wonders if she hit her with the car. When he asks Kevin (Steve Howey) for advice, he is told that he needs to give her the cold shoulder and not cede in to sex.

Homeless again, Frank (William H. Macy) convinces Carl (Ethan Cutkosky) to let him sleep in the backyard's family van without telling the family. During this, Frank relates how he used to perform heists with his father when he was Carl's age, fascinating him. They then decide to rob Carl's former foster parents, with Carl helping Frank in entering and planning a map. As Jimmy (Justin Chatwin) wants to leave for Michigan, Fiona (Emmy Rossum) begins to consider leaving with him and uprooting her siblings. However, she discovers that Jimmy had already rented a studio apartment before talking with her. Fiona and Jimmy get into an argument over their relationship; Jimmy criticizes Fiona for not being receptive to his feelings and insults her lifestyle, stating he's been "living in a goddamn slum". In turn, Fiona kicks him out of the house.

Lip starts avoiding Mandy, although she later tries to have sex with him. He later visits Karen, who has returned to her house in a vegetative state; Jody (Zach McGowan) explains that Karen can recall memories from before the accident, but cannot form any new memories. Ian (Cameron Monaghan) meets with Mickey (Noel Fisher) at his wedding, trying to convince him not to go forward. While the two share an intimate moment, Mickey still goes forward in marrying Svetlana (Isidora Goreshter) as he fears his father's reaction. Fiona goes on a camping trip with Mike (Jake McDorman), bringing Debbie (Emma Kenney) along. At their tent, Fiona and Mike almost have sex, but Fiona finds herself unable to do it. Meanwhile, Jimmy is forced to attend a meeting with Nando (Pêpê Rapazote), who breaks bad news for Jimmy: Estefania is about to be deported, as Jimmy was not in the apartment to help her with a visit from an immigration officer.

Distraught over Karen's state, Lip crashes Mickey's wedding to scold Mandy for ruining her life and breaks up with her. A drunk Ian also leaves the wedding, revealing that he and Mickey had sex. As Lip and Ian return home from the wedding, they find Carl being arrested by the police; he and Frank managed to steal valuable items, but Carl was quickly determined a prime suspect as he had the house's code. As Lip protests, Frank emerges and takes the blame for the robbery, claiming he forced Carl to give him the code. As Frank is taken by the cops, Carl and Lip are left confused and surprised by Frank's actions. Nando takes Jimmy to the docks, and forces him to board a yacht to an unknown destination. Fearing for his life, Jimmy wishes to call Fiona one last time, but Beto throws his phone into Lake Michigan. Meanwhile, Fiona leaves a voicemail for Jimmy, hoping to reconcile.

== Production ==
=== Development ===
The episode was written by co-producer Sheila Callaghan, and directed by Sanaa Hamri. It was Callaghan's second writing credit, and Hamri's second directing credit.

== Reception ==
=== Viewers ===
In its original American broadcast, "Order Room Service" was seen by an estimated 1.65 million household viewers with a 0.8 in the 18–49 demographics. This means that 0.8 percent of all households with televisions watched the episode. This was a slight increase in viewership from the previous episode, which was seen by an estimated 1.61 million household viewers with a 0.8 in the 18–49 demographics.

=== Critical reviews ===
"Order Room Service" received critical acclaim. Joshua Alston of The A.V. Club gave the episode an "A" grade, calling it the best episode of the season: "Shameless has followed the same formula every year, a formula in which the penultimate episode of the season is the event. Then there's a season finale that may resolve one or two low-priority threads or sprinkle in some ideas for next season, but is mostly a weird coda that feels like it's dangling from an otherwise complete season. "Order Room Service" is that penultimate episode, and it brings together the threads we've been following in the back half of the season so deftly, it compensates for the season's occasional wobbliness." Alston also praised the conclusion to Frank's storyline, writing "[It's] a genuinely selfless moment for a man we barely knew understood the concept of selflessness."

John Vilanova of Paste gave the episode an 8.1 out of 10 rating, praising Macy's performance and the character development of Frank: "This season in particular, Frank has done right by the kids every once in a while, particularly Carl. He's still a deadbeat, which is inexcusable no matter what the circumstances, but it's at least in part a function of his own life exacerbated by alcoholism and borderline disorder-level megalomania." Despite enjoying the episode, Vilanova was critical of the season's overarching storylines and questioned the overall themes: "In this, the penultimate episode of Shameless's stuttering third season, I found myself asking some bigger questions about what this season of television was supposed to do. After investing 11 hours of our time over the last three months, what has actually happened to the Gallagher family? [...] Most of the developments this season have either been few-episode arcs [or] have involved the players on the periphery."

David Crow of Den of Geek called the episode "surprisingly poignant", and commented on Jimmy's character: "You were a fool, but damn letting Estefania getting pinched by INS was not worth going out LIKE THAT." Leigh Raines of TV Fanatic gave the episode a 4 star rating out of 5.

=== Accolades ===
TVLine named Emmy Rossum as the "Performer of the Week" for the week of April 6, 2013, for her performance in the episode. The site wrote, "Shameless' coffeehouse-set clash on this past Sunday's episode might have been Jimmy's exploding moment, but it was leading lady Emmy Rossum who once again blew us away."
