= The Sins of My Caretaker =

- Shameless episode
- Episode no.: Season 3 Episode 5
- Directed by: J. Michael Muro
- Written by: Sheila Callaghan
- Cinematography by: Rodney Charters
- Editing by: Regis Kimble
- Production code: 2J6605
- Original release date: February 17, 2013
- Running time: 56 minutes

Guest appearances
- Joan Cusack as Sheila Jackson; Harry Hamlin as Lloyd Lishman; Vanessa Bell Calloway as Carol Fisher; Julia Duffy as Candace Lishman; Eric Edelstein as Bobby Mallison; Stephanie Fantauzzi as Estefania; Madison Rothschild as Molly; Rose Abdoo as Dr. Vega; Keiko Agena as Brittany Sturgess; Nicky Korba as Little Hank; J. Michael Trautmann as Iggy Milkovich; Roberta Valderrama as Princess; David Wells as Father Pete

Episode chronology
← Previous "The Helpful Gallaghers"	Next → "Cascading Failures"
- Shameless season 3

"The Sins of My Caretaker" is the fifth episode of the third season of the American television comedy drama Shameless, an adaptation of the British series of the same name. It is the 29th overall episode of the series and was written by co-producer Sheila Callaghan, and directed by J. Michael Muro. It originally aired on Showtime on February 17, 2013.

The series is set on the South Side of Chicago, Illinois, and depicts the poor, dysfunctional family of Frank Gallagher, a neglectful single father of six: Fiona, Phillip, Ian, Debbie, Carl, and Liam. He spends his days drunk, high, or in search of money, while his children need to learn to take care of themselves. In the episode, Frank must find Aunt Ginger's corpse before city employees discover it, while Fiona faces crisis at home.

According to Nielsen Media Research, the episode was seen by an estimated 1.31 million household viewers and gained a 0.6 ratings share among adults aged 18–49. The episode received highly positive reviews from critics, who praised the dramatic tone and performances, although the disjointed storylines drew mixed reactions.

== Plot ==
A city employee notifies Fiona (Emmy Rossum) that the city will be doing sewer line work in the backyard, which will leave them without water for one day. However, Fiona realizes that the body of Aunt Ginger is still in the backyard; she orders Frank (William H. Macy) to dig her up, warning him he will go to prison if the body is found as he has cashed her checks.

With Molly (Madison Rothschild) and Mandy (Emma Greenwell) moving in with the Gallaghers, Lip (Jeremy Allen White) has become distant in their relationship, often declining her advances. During a visit, Lip yells at her, prompting her to leave the house; Ian (Cameron Monaghan) confronts Lip over his treatment of Mandy, knowing that it might be influenced by his relationship with Karen. Ian is also contacted by Lloyd (Harry Hamlin), who asks him for a favor; he wants him to rob his own house and retrieve his most personal belongings, with Ian keeping some of them. Ian asks Mickey (Noel Fisher) for help, and he gets his cousins to help in the robbery. Despite that, Mickey is shaken over Ian's relationship with Lloyd, especially when Ian says Lloyd is not afraid to kiss him.

Sheila (Joan Cusack) and Jody (Zach McGowan) welcome a nun as part of their hospice business. The nun uses a wheelchair and has chosen to take a vow of silence, allowing Sheila and Jody to continue their sexual encounters without incident. However, Sheila is shocked upon learning that the nun has written a blog named "The Sins of My Caretaker" that details her and Jody's sex life. Fed up with the nun, Sheila drops her off outside a church and throws her baggage at an incoming car. After failing to convince her co-workers over not giving in to the sexual advances of the boss, Fiona is bullied at work. While at a public pool, Debbie (Emma Kenney) is humiliated when a few girls prank her over her body and she cries back home. After several unsuccessful attempts at getting pregnant, Veronica (Shanola Hampton) and Kevin (Steve Howey) consider finding potential surrogates; Veronica considers asking her mother Carol (Vanessa Bell Calloway).

After Frank fails to find the body, Fiona makes her siblings help in digging up the body. During this, Jimmy (Justin Chatwin) shows up, distracted over his father's sexuality. When Fiona downplays it, Jimmy calls her out for not supporting him when he always did. This causes Fiona to go on a meltdown, detailing all the problems in the family; upset, Jimmy walk away and turns to Estefania (Stephanie Fantauzzi) for emotional support. By night, the Gallaghers decide to continue the following day. Lip leaves an angry voicemail to Karen, and apologizes to Mandy for his actions.

Before the robbery, Mickey surprises Ian by kissing him on the lips. They manage to steal most of the items, but Candace (Julia Duffy) is alarmed by their presence and shoots them with a shotgun, hitting Mickey in the buttocks and forcing them to escape. They take him to the Gallagher household, just as two women are awaiting to meet them. Lloyd arrives and helps remove the bullet from Mickey. During this, Fiona finally finds Aunt Ginger's bones and Debbie tries to drown her bully at the public pool. As Fiona sees the chaos at home, the woman enters and is shocked by the events. She introduces herself as Brittany Sturgess (Keiko Agena), a CPS representative.

== Production ==
=== Development ===
The episode was written by co-producer Sheila Callaghan, and directed by J. Michael Muro. It was Callaghan's first writing credit, and Muro's first directing credit.

== Reception ==
=== Viewers ===
In its original American broadcast, "The Sins of My Caretaker" was seen by an estimated 1.31 million household viewers with a 0.6 in the 18–49 demographics. This means that 0.6 percent of all households with televisions watched the episode. This was a 15% decrease in viewership from the previous episode, which was seen by an estimated 1.53 million household viewers with a 0.7 in the 18–49 demographics.

=== Critical reviews ===
"The Sins of My Caretaker" received highly positive reviews from critics. Molly Eichel of The A.V. Club gave the episode a "B+" grade and wrote, ""The Sins of My Caretaker" didn't reach the heights of last week's excellent entry, but the episode hit all of the right emotional beats while setting up a potential arc to take the Gallaghers through the rest of the third season."

John Vilanova of Paste gave the episode a 6.9 out of 10 rating and wrote, ""The Sins of My Caretakers" was a prime example of Shameless' on-again propensity to cram too much stuff into its allotted time. What often makes this frustrating is that it becomes harder than it should be to distinguish which plots are going to be important in the grander arc of the season and which are nothing more than color for a week or two. Running scattershot through the South Side makes it difficult for any of these plots to develop deeply or connect in any real way. And while this week's episode had its moments — particularly those contained within the strong final third — it felt more like a cobbled-together collection of scenes that lacked any real thematic unity."

David Crow of Den of Geek wrote, ""The Sins of My Caretaker" is the ominous title of the episode and sins of the past, present and future is the name of its game. For these primarily Irish-Catholic Chicagoans, only mistakes lay ahead." Leigh Raines of TV Fanatic gave the episode a 4.5 star rating out of 5 and wrote, "It was a one big pissing contest on this week's episode of Shameless. In "The Sins of My Caretaker," Jimmy was still grappling with that news he found out at the end of last week's episode, "The Helpful Gallaghers.""
