= The American Dream (Shameless) =

- Shameless episode
- Episode no.: Season 3 Episode 2
- Directed by: Anthony Hemingway
- Written by: Nancy M. Pimental
- Cinematography by: Rodney Charters
- Editing by: Gregg Featherman
- Production code: 2J6602
- Original release date: January 20, 2013
- Running time: 56 minutes

Guest appearances
- Joan Cusack as Sheila Jackson; Stephanie Fantauzzi as Estefania; Ed Lauter as Dick Healey; Bernardo de Paula as Beto; Cameron Richardson as Cheryl; Vyto Ruginis as Edward Gretsky; Diora Baird as Meg; Brendan Patrick Connor as George; Joseph Fuhr as Casper Duncan; Michael Patrick McGill as Tommy; Kerry O'Malley as Kate; Kevin Phillips as Wendell; Harrison Xu as Ralph Wong

Episode chronology
| ← Previous "El Gran Cañon" | Next → "May I Trim Your Hedges?" |
- Shameless season 3

"The American Dream" is the second episode of the third season of the American television comedy drama Shameless, an adaptation of the British series of the same name. It is the 26th overall episode of the series and was written by co-executive producer Nancy M. Pimental, and directed by Anthony Hemingway. It originally aired on Showtime on January 20, 2013.

The series is set on the South Side of Chicago, Illinois, and depicts the poor, dysfunctional family of Frank Gallagher, a neglectful single father of six: Fiona, Phillip, Ian, Debbie, Carl, and Liam. He spends his days drunk, high, or in search of money, while his children need to learn to take care of themselves. In the episode, Frank tries to get back into the house, while Fiona tries to throw a party at the night club to earn money.

According to Nielsen Media Research, the episode was seen by an estimated 1.37 million household viewers and gained a 0.7 ratings share among adults aged 18–49. The episode received positive reviews from critics, who praised the episode's themes and writing.

== Plot ==
Frank (William H. Macy) is trying to settle back at his house, but the family is refusing to give him a room, with the exception of Debbie (Emma Kenney). Meanwhile, Jimmy (Justin Chatwin) is dismayed to discover that Nando has sent a henchman, Beto (Bernardo de Paula), to check on him and prevent him from getting into trouble.

At the night club, Fiona (Emmy Rossum) wants to increase her reputation with the leadership, and offers to get beverage for the club night. Her boss agrees to the deal, but Fiona discovers that Kevin (Steve Howey) cannot provide her with the required supply as he has lost contacts. He gets her in touch with his last contact, who has ties to the organized crime. Fiona manages to get her beverage supply, although she signs a check without having enough to pay for it. To complicate matters, an official reminds her she does not have a licence to operate, and will only allow her to go forward with her business if he gets a share of the profits. Seeing that Lip (Jeremy Allen White) is not prioritizing his education, Mandy (Emma Greenwell) talks with his teacher to get him to apply for college. Ian (Cameron Monaghan) is surprised when Mickey (Noel Fisher) is released due to over-crowding; while they resume their sexual relationship, Mickey is still not interested in anything serious. Veronica (Shanola Hampton) is visited by a woman, who reveals herself to be Kevin's wife.

Sheila (Joan Cusack) grows tired of caring for Hymie, to the point that she accidentally leaves him in the dumpster just before it is grabbed by the city workers. Debbie decides to help her in caring for the baby, but Hymie does not stop crying. She asks Frank for help, and he manages to make him sleep by giving him valium. The following day, Frank gets into a fight with his family over his stay at the house. During this, he accidentally breaks Debbie's art project and insults it. A heartbroken Debbie then hits Frank with a bag, while Lip and Ian kick Frank out of the house.

At the Alibi Room, Frank laments the actions of his children, and he decides to call CPS to inform them that his family is living in an abusive environment. This is overhead by the bar employee, Kate (Kerry O'Malley), who tells him "That is a whole new low even for you, Frank." Frank then shows up at Sheila's house, where he surprises her and Jody (Zach McGowan) by managing to get Hymie to sleep; Sheila allows him to stay overnight. At the party, Fiona's party proves to be a success, although it is revealed that Lip had conned rich kids into coming to the club for a fake concert. However, due to having to cover the payments to everyone, Fiona realizes she lost $100 by throwing the party. As she returns home, she is mocked by Lip for having risked their money. He also reveals that he has already covered the property tax, suggesting he should be in charge of the family.

== Production ==
=== Development ===
The episode was written by co-executive producer Nancy M. Pimental, and directed by Anthony Hemingway. It was Pimental's seventh writing credit, and Hemingway's second directing credit.

== Reception ==
=== Viewers ===
In its original American broadcast, "The American Dream" was seen by an estimated 1.37 million household viewers with a 0.7 in the 18–49 demographics. This means that 0.7 percent of all households with televisions watched the episode. This was a 32% decrease in viewership from the previous episode, which was seen by an estimated 2.00 million household viewers with a 1.1 in the 18–49 demographics.

=== Critical reviews ===
"The American Dream" received positive reviews from critics. Joshua Alston of The A.V. Club gave the episode a "B–" grade and wrote, "Shameless does two things especially well: observational nuggets from the Gallaghers' cartoonish world of poverty and goofy, weird, perverted little capers. When the show is firing on all cylinders, it's working both as a skanky slice-of-life, and there's some little plot arc that seems to be building to something. But here, at the beginning of the third season, there's not much of anything to grab onto."

Alan Sepinwall of HitFix wrote, "what's most interesting about "The American Dream" is that Frank isn't the most destructive force within or without the Gallagher family this week. Instead, Fiona and Lip have turned on each other after Fiona decided to borrow from the squirrel fund to set up her ill-fated club night. It's not the disaster I feared it would be when she started kiting checks to the mob, in that all she loses is a hundred bucks, but that's only because of Lip's efforts in sending the rich kids there with the bogus Wilco tip."

David Crow of Den of Geek wrote, "It felt far too convenient for the plot that a character who has driven BMWs and bought houses on a whim is suddenly broke and cannot think of a way to turn a dollar that is less obvious than stealing a car. Still, it is a strong episode that promises plenty of mean spirited cruelty to come." Leigh Raines of TV Fanatic gave the episode a 4.5 star rating out of 5 and wrote, "This week's episode was a lot better than last Sunday's and I'm excited to see this season on the upswing."
