= Cascading Failures =

- Shameless episode
- Episode no.: Season 3 Episode 6
- Directed by: Anthony Hemingway
- Written by: Alex Borstein
- Cinematography by: Rodney Charters
- Editing by: Finnian Murray
- Production code: 2J6606
- Original release date: February 24, 2013
- Running time: 54 minutes

Guest appearances
- Joan Cusack as Sheila Jackson (special guest star); Alex Borstein as Lou Deckner; Vanessa Bell Calloway as Carol Fisher; Eric Edelstein as Bobby Mallison; Juanita Jennings as Mama Kamala; Mustafa Shakir as D'Andre; Chris Butler as Cassius; Mike Doyle as Lanier; Keiko Agena as Brittany Sturgess; Julie Ariola as Patty; Chris Burns as Andrea Johnson; Dennis Cockrum as Terry Milkovich

Episode chronology
← Previous "The Sins of My Caretaker"	Next → "A Long Way From Home"
- Shameless season 3

"Cascading Failures" is the sixth episode of the third season of the American television comedy drama Shameless, an adaptation of the British series of the same name. It is the 30th overall episode of the series and was written by consulting producer Alex Borstein, and directed by Anthony Hemingway. It originally aired on Showtime on February 24, 2013.

The series is set on the South Side of Chicago, Illinois, and depicts the poor, dysfunctional family of Frank Gallagher, a neglectful single father of six: Fiona, Phillip, Ian, Debbie, Carl, and Liam. He spends his days drunk, high, or in search of money, while his children need to learn to take care of themselves. In the episode, Fiona tries to locate her siblings as they are sent to different foster homes, while Frank decides to help her.

According to Nielsen Media Research, the episode was seen by an estimated 1.48 million household viewers and gained a 0.7 ratings share among adults aged 18–49. The episode received positive reviews from critics, who praised the ending and performances.

== Plot ==
CPS takes Lip (Jeremy Allen White), Ian (Cameron Monaghan), Carl (Ethan Cutkosky), Debbie (Emma Kenney) and Liam, with Brittany (Keiko Agena) not disclosing the identity of the person who reported the Gallaghers. Brittany explains that Carl and Liam will go to the same house, Debbie will be in another home, and Lip and Ian will be sent to a group home for delinquents as they are too old. Carl rebels against his gay adoptive parents, and tries to steal some of their items. Debbie hates her new home, as she is forced to do errands around the house with the other kids.

As Veronica (Shanola Hampton) is unable to ask for custody due to her past encounters with CPS and with Monica nowhere to be found, Fiona (Emmy Rossum) is forced to ask Frank (William H. Macy) to help her case; Frank only agrees to do so as long as he is allowed to move back into the house. Fiona also quits her job at the grocery store when Bobby (Eric Edelstein) refuses to give her time off to look for her siblings. For the petition of custody, Frank is forced to sober up and to formally ask for the permits. However, his lawyer, Lou Deckner (Alex Borstein), tells him his case will not be taken seriously unless he is accompanied by his wife for the signatures; Frank and Fiona ask Sheila (Joan Cusack) to pretend to be Monica for the petition. While Brittany falls for the ruse, they are still forced to take parenting classes; Frank is also forced to put clean urine in his mouth to pass a drug test. During this, Veronica and Kevin (Steve Howey) are struggling with the surrogacy; Veronica suggests Kevin should have sex with Carol (Vanessa Bell Calloway) to properly impregnate her. Although disgusted, they both agree.

While Lip challenges the orders of the group home's superior, Ian is allowed to leave to continue working at the store and meet with Mickey (Noel Fisher). The two have sex at Mickey's house, but they are interrupted by the arrival of Terry (Dennis Cockrum), who brutally attacks them and holds Ian at gunpoint. He brings in a prostitute, Svetlana (Isidora Goreshter), to have sex with Mickey while forcing Ian to watch. Later, Fiona meets with Brittany, who reports that the paperwork is now approved. When Fiona asks about the anonymous tip, Brittany only refers that it was a man. She then decides to break her protocol, allowing Fiona to listen to the phone call while she leaves for the bathroom. Fiona listens to the file and is shocked upon learning that Frank was the anonymous tip.

== Production ==
=== Development ===
The episode was written by consulting producer Alex Borstein, and directed by Anthony Hemingway. It was Borstein's fifth writing credit, and Hemingway's third directing credit.

== Reception ==
=== Viewers ===
In its original American broadcast, "Cascading Failures" was seen by an estimated 1.48 million household viewers with a 0.7 in the 18–49 demographics. This means that 0.7 percent of all households with televisions watched the episode. This was a 12% increase in viewership from the previous episode, which was seen by an estimated 1.31 million household viewers with a 0.6 in the 18–49 demographics.

=== Critical reviews ===
"Cascading Failures" received positive reviews from critics. Joshua Alston of The A.V. Club gave the episode a "B–" grade and wrote, "Shameless is a show that refuses to grow up. And that's not always a bad thing, as puerile humor and anti-social behavior are often used to great effect in the show. But it does become a problem when Shameless indulges all its worst instincts simultaneously, and "Cascading Failures" is a good example of that. And it's too bad, because the episode is built on an interesting premise, and has a few stellar scenes sprinkled through it, but generally suffers from a lack of focus and a general tendency toward throwing really weird ideas against the wall to see what sticks."

John Vilanova of Paste gave the episode an 8.1 out of 10 rating and wrote, "If they can handle a hearing next week, the Gallagher network will be back online. But with Fiona learning that Frank was the one who reported them to protective services in the first place, we may be primed for a short circuit next week."

Leigh Raines of TV Fanatic gave the episode a 4.5 star rating out of 5 and wrote, "The mark of a powerful episode of Shameless is when it can make you laugh, cry, feel furious and also feel physically sick - all in one episode. "Cascading Failures" brought all of those emotions to the table, as the Gallagher kids were yanked from Fiona's home and scattered in foster care." Your Entertainment Corner wrote that the episode "takes you on a roller coaster of emotions and makes powerful political statements about foster care and homosexuality. Now, I can't wait to see what happens when Frank gets his own room in the Gallagher household, as Fiona has promised. It's sure to lead to more fun and shameless experiences."
