= Phoenix (1998 film) =

- Theatrical release poster
- Directed by: Danny Cannon
- Written by: Eddie Richey
- Produced by: Victoria Nevinny; Tracie Graham Rice
- Starring: Ray Liotta; Anthony LaPaglia; Anjelica Huston; Daniel Baldwin; Jeremy Piven; Tom Noonan; Giancarlo Esposito
- Cinematography: James L. Carter
- Edited by: Zach Staenberg
- Music by: Graeme Revell
- Production company: Lakeshore Entertainment
- Distributed by: Trimark Pictures
- Release date: September 4, 1998
- Running time: 107 minutes
- Country: United States
- Language: English
- Box office: $45,661

Phoenix is a 1998 American neo-noir crime film directed by British director Danny Cannon and starring Ray Liotta. Liotta plays a cop whose gambling debt leaves him indebted to the underworld and desperate to find a way out without compromising his principles.

== Plot ==
In Phoenix, Arizona, Harry Collins is a cop whose compulsive gambling has indebted him to a local gangster, Chicago. As his losses mount and time count down, Collins resorts to exploiting a young woman, Veronica, whom he has picked up to distract his friends in a poker game. Despite the successful distraction, he still loses, and he rejects Veronica's sexual advances, as he considers her to be bad luck. When Collins drops her off at her house, Veronica's mother sees her daughter in tears and glares at Collins. Collins later tracks down Veronica's mother, Leila, and defends himself, stating that he did not have sex with her. Unimpressed, Leila rebukes him, which causes him to reassess his behavior and offer a sincere apology. Surprised by his apology, Leila slowly warms to Collins, and they begin a romance. Having lost his lucky lighter, Collins asks her for a keepsake, but Leila tells him that he must make his own luck and avoid whatever trouble in which he's become involved.

Meanwhile, Chicago cuts off Collins from his bookies and gives him 48 hours to either repay his debt or murder Joey, a young suspect held in custody. Mike Henshaw, Collins' corrupt partner, suggests murdering Chicago, but Collins, unwilling to welch on a bet or murder Joey, decides instead to rob Louie, a local loan shark. Collins recruits Henshaw and another corrupt cop, James Nutter, and, over their objections, brings in a more strait-laced cop, Fred Shuster. Unknown to the others, Shuster has discovered that his wife, Katie, is having an affair with Henshaw. Distraught and feeling betrayed, Shuster agrees to work with Lt. Webber to bring down the corrupt cops. However, the robbery is botched when the trigger-happy Henshaw kills Louie before he can open the safe. Collins hires a local locksmith to crack Louie's safe, and the group splits up. Collins and Shuster arrive at the meeting point, but Lt. Webber is already there; Webber betrays Shuster, killing him, and shoots Collins in the gut. Collins escapes, but Webber steals the money.

Nutter and Henshaw, suspecting that Collins has betrayed them, arrive at the meeting point and discover Shuster's body. Before they can track down Collins and kill him, they are surrounded by the police. When Nutter attempts to surrender, Henshaw kills him; Henshaw is killed in turn by the other cops. Collins hitches a ride back to town and surprises Katie and Webber, who are having an affair. Over their objections, Collins burns most of the money while denouncing them both for betraying Fred. After alerting the cops to Webber's involvement, Collins takes enough money to pay off his gambling debt and meets with Chicago. Amused, Chicago accepts the money but mocks Collins' reluctance to murder Joey; Chicago reveals that he has had Joey murdered in prison and points out that had Collins simply murdered Joey, all of this trouble could have been avoided. Enraged, Collins kills Chicago and his bodyguards, then stumbles back to his car, where he apparently dies of his wounds.

== Cast ==
- Ray Liotta as Detective Harry Collins
- Anthony LaPaglia as Detective Mike Henshaw
- Anjelica Huston as Leila
- Daniel Baldwin as Detective James Nutter
- Jeremy Piven as Detective Fred Shuster
- George Aguilar as "Mr. Fat"
- Tom Noonan as "Chicago"
- Xander Berkeley as Lieutenant Clyde Webber
- Al Sapienza as Cop
- George Murdock as Sid
- Carmen Filpi as Locksmith
- Giancarlo Esposito as Louie
- Brittany Murphy as Veronica
- Kari Wührer as Katie Shuster
- Giovanni Ribisi as Joey Schneider
- Royce D. Applegate as Detective Dickerman

== Reception ==
Rotten Tomatoes, a review aggregator, reports that 50% of six surveyed critics gave the film a positive review; the average rating was 5.5/10. Lawrence Van Gelder, writing in The New York Times, stated that "character and conversation outweigh momentum and suspense in Phoenix but a gifted cast [...] splashes alluring color across its familiar noir". Kevin Thomas of the Los Angeles Times described the film as "a terrific neo-noir". In a negative review, Leonard Klady of Variety called the film "largely tiresome and uninspired", more suited to pay cable.

== Soundtrack ==
- "Ama" (written by Daniel Riddle and David Parks) performed by Hitting Birth
- "11 O'Clock" (Mark Sandman) by Morphine
- "Dogs of Lust (Germicide Mix)" (Matt Johnson) by The The
- "K. C. " (Guy Davis, Marc Olson, and Mike Williamson) by Sage
- "Terrified" (Hubert Clifford) by Hubert Clifford
- "Tragedy" (Clive Richardson) by Clive Richardson
- "Mas y Mas" (David Hidalgo and Louis Perez) by Los Lobos
- "Terraplane Blues" (Robert Johnson) by Robert Johnson
- "Untitled #1" (Josh Haden) by Spain
- "I Can't Win" (Leonard Johnson, Dave Richardson, and Cliff Knight) by Ry Cooder
- "From Four Until Late" (Robert Johnson) by Robert Johnson
- "Until Tomorrow" (Graeme Revell, Danny Cannon, and Gail Ann Dorsey) by Gail Ann Dorsey
