= Starving in Suburbia =

2014 television drama film

- Television advertising poster
- Genre: Drama; Psychological drama
- Written by: Tara Miele
- Directed by: Tara Miele
- Starring: Laura Wiggins; Brendan Meyer; Paula Newsome; Marcus Giamatti; Izabella Miko; Emma Dumont; Callie Thorne
- Music by: Kim Carroll
- Country of origin: United States
- Original language: English

Production
- Executive producers: Sharon Bordas; Fernando Szew; Hannah Pillemer
- Producers: Ross Kohn; Jude Tucker; Nancy Leopardi
- Production location: United States
- Cinematography: Damian Horan
- Editor: Josh Rifkin
- Running time: 84 minutes
- Production companies: Lifetime Movie Network; Indy Entertainment; Modern VideoFilm

Original release
- Release: April 26, 2014

Starving in Suburbia (also sold under the title Thinspiration) is a 2014 American psychological drama made-for-television film about a high school student and competitive dancer, Hannah, who develops a severe eating disorder after becoming obsessed with a pro-ana site that promotes self-starvation, as Hannah's family are preoccupied by her wrestler brother's upcoming tournament. The film stars Laura Wiggins, Brendan Meyer, Paula Newsome, Marcus Giamatti, Izabella Miko, Emma Dumont and Callie Thorne. It received mixed reviews from critics, while being noted for addressing two phenomenons previously unaddressed by made-for-television films: pro-ana websites, and anorexia among males.

== Plot ==
Hannah and Leo are teenage siblings from a competitive family. Hannah takes classes in interpretive dancing, hoping to be at the forefront of an upcoming dance meet, while Leo's time is taken up mostly by wrestling, which requires him to make weight and undergo a strict regimen of diets and training. This focus on Leo leaves Hannah, 17 years old, largely up to her own devices. She works part-time at a bakery, and spends time socially with her friends.

One day, she and her best friend, Kayden, are browsing the internet in Hannah's bedroom when Kayden shows Hannah a pro-ana blog, which features multiple gifs of unnaturally-thin people, skeletons, motivational quotes that mock fat people and tips on how to avoid eating. Hannah gets curious, asking Kayden who "ButterflyAna" is, to which she answers that she is her cousin's friend, who runs the site. They attempt to open the chatroom, but are stopped by a privacy lock.

The following day Hannah joins her family for breakfast and is surrounded by talks of her family's dieting. Her father asks her to join them on a run, to which she asks if he thinks she is fat. She storms out to hang out with Kayden and her boyfriend, Brendan, where they talk about their future and college. Kayden reveals that Hannah is going to apply to NYU, which is close to Brendan's residence. They promise to hang out when, or if, she gets in, and assure themselves that "it will all be okay".

Hannah tries to work on her college entrance essay, but cannot get past the starting words. After going downstairs to get peanut butter from the kitchen, she goes back to the site and joins as a member. Hannah envisions the forum's visitors in her mind as real people. "ButterflyAna" visually appears, and relates to Hannah's inner feelings of poor self-esteem and concerns about things such as her weight, perceived stomach distention and eating too much, and promises to help her lose weight.

At first, as Hannah begins to eat less and less, nobody takes notice. Hannah is made more self-conscious when her mother buys shorts in her size, but they don't fit her. After getting to her initial goal weight, "ButterflyAna" and other members of the chatroom swear to help her lose even more. Her parents are mildly confused but initially do not care until her mother comes to her room and find the pro-ana blog open on her computer. Disturbed by it, she demands that Hannah never visit the site again, and wants the password to it. Hannah tells the other members of the site that her parents know she’s on it; the others delete their accounts in fear of caught by their parents. Hannah lies to her parents that the account was made by the girls in her dance class, and insists that she is healthy. Hannah's father insists that this invasion of privacy is unnecessary. He is too occupied by Leo's upcoming wrestling competition to focus on Hannah, and urges Leo to make weight and keep his attention on winning.

Hannah gets a friend request from a previous member, "HipPopK", who gives her a serious warning to stay away from the pro-ana blog and "ButterflyAna" before she is afflicted with anorexia. "HipPopK" appears to know Hannah's true identity, leaving her worried. In dance class her performance begins to deteriorate, resulting in her dance coach, Ms. Christie, telling Hannah to talk to her if anything is wrong.

Hannah attends Brendan's party, where she find out he and Kayden broke up. She wants to leave, but he convinces her to stay and drink with him. She confesses her crush on him, ending with them having sex. The next morning, she discovers she’s gained a pound. "ButterflyAna" berates her for "not doing it right" and makes her start prolonged fasting, making her promise to not eat anything.

Hannah's behavior worsens. Brendan tells her he got back together with Kayden. After a fight with her, Hannah rips open a garbage bag and eats most of old pastries that she was supposed to throw away, only to then vomit them up. She then vocally dedicates herself to "ana". At home, Hannah's parents start to notice her drastic weight loss and refusal to eat, while arguing about Leo's strict diet. Hannah visits the forum and admits that she slipped up, but "ButterflyAna" is unsympathetic, chastising Hannah for gaining weight. At practice, Hannah accuses Kayden of being "HipPopK", but Kayden seems shocked to find out she has continued to visit the site and refuses to tell Hannah anything. Hannah cannot perform and starts insulting the girl in the class and Ms. Christie, who orders her to leave the class.

Hannah's mother goes into Hannah's room to check on her, and discovers her daughter has changed her laptop password without telling her the new password, as well as uninstalling the monitoring software and using an illegal filter-breaker proxy to get round the content lock, before noticing her bedroom walls covered in cutouts from magazines of thin supermodels and women in bikinis. She finds a strange number of moths fluttering around the room, accompanied by a pungent smell, and the curtains have been drawn closed, making the room extremely dark. Hannah's mother opens the bedroom closet and sobs hysterically when she discovers numerous dinner plates of moldy food hidden among Hannah's clothing. The moth caterpillars are feeding on the food and laying eggs there. Hannah comes home, looking haggard and pale, and she flies into a rage upon finding that her mother has gone through her room. She confronts her mother, who takes her laptop and runs out of the room to dispose of it, and begins to tear up the room in fury and is taken to the hospital. Her parents' insurance coverage won't let her stay inpatient, but gives Hannah a brief number of outpatient counselling sessions.

Her family has to modify the house and their routine, throwing out their scale and razors, and Hannah's mother watches her when she uses the computer, having wired her room with hidden cameras and microphones, bugged her phone in order to intercept any texts or calls she sends or receives, and resetting her laptop to factory settings and installing new monitoring software. With the wrestling match coming fast, Hannah's father is shown being stricter with Leo, telling him that if he doesn't make weight, he can't wrestle. Leaving his dinner, Leo goes to bed. Hannah goes through the garbage bins, finding the scale before going inside and asking Leo for his tablet to visit the site. "ButterflyAna" congratulates Hannah on defying her parents and makes her swear to not celebrate her weight loss with food. She is interrupted by Leo demanding to have his tablet back as he needs to check his school emails.

In therapy she talks back to her therapist, who tries to warn her about the dangers of her behaviors. She is told to draw a picture of her eating disorder, which she depicts as personified by a dark, sinister face in black ink, which she hangs among upbeat and motivating artworks made by other minors suffering from eating disorders.

That weekend the family goes to watch Leo's wrestling competition when he meets his weight goal. Leo nearly wins, but his opponent recoils in horror after Leo falls unconscious underneath him while bleeding heavily from the eyes. When Leo is brought to the hospital, it is revealed that his heart has given out dues to stress and dehydration and he is being kept on life support, showing no brain activity. Hannah comes to the realization that Leo himself is the unknown "HipPopK" after finding out a "hippop" is a wrestling move and his nickname in wrestling is "Killer". Hannah's father is outraged at the suggestion that Leo himself suffered from an eating disorder, arguing that "boys and athletes" don't suffer from such things. Hannah tells her parents Leo has carved "DON'T EAT" on his own stomach, a marking that had been on the screen name's profile photo. Leo dies in the hospital, surrounded by his family. After Leo's death, Hannah freaks out in her room, tearing down her thinspiration images and breaking her mirror before yelling out that the disorder won't have both of them.

Hannah then seeks out the real "ButterflyAna", and finds an adult woman who is living with anorexia, hoarding decaying cosmetics and beauty supplies and keeping an old laptop computer with her. She has a small house, but it looks filthy and neglected. Hannah confronts the woman, telling her that her brother, "HipPopK", has died and asks her to take down the site, threatening to call the police and have her arrested for the murder of her brother if she does not. She argues that his death is not her fault, but eventually apologizes for the loss of Hannah's brother. Hannah tells the woman that she hopes she gets better soon and seeks help. Afterwards, Hannah continues therapy and is welcomed back to dance class by Ms. Christie, who hugs her. She starts a self-esteem inspiration website in honour of Leo's memory, which contains only positive inspirational quotes and no pro-ana content at all, and asks her friends to install content filters on their devices to protect them from being infected with anorexia.

== Cast ==
- Laura Wiggins as Hannah
- Marcus Giamatti as Michael (Hannah's Father)
- Callie Thorne as Joey (Hannah's Mother)
- Emma Dumont as Kayden
- Brendan Meyer as Leo
- Izabella Miko as ButterflyAna
- Paula Newsome as Ms. Christie
- Luke Gregory Crosby as Leo's Teammate
- Olivia Jordan as Thin Chic Teen Magazine Woman

== Reception ==
Starving in Suburbia received mixed reviews from critics. The Atlantic argued that the film was just repeating the same patterns as other predecessor eating disorder-themed films, and that the feature of pro-ana websites was just a nuance, stating, "recently, Lifetime aired Starving in Suburbia, a 2014 film that expanded the confines of the genre [eating disorder films] by including a new scare factor: pro-anorexia (colloquially known as pro-ana) websites, which supposedly lure unsuspecting teens into starving themselves by encouraging anorexics to share their own tips and tricks. On the one hand, Americans are surprisingly educated about anorexia. Eighty-two percent of people surveyed in 2010 described eating disorders as a serious mental and physical illness, with only 12 percent dismissing them as afflictions of vanity. On the other, cultural portrayals of anorexia have become inextricable from the disease itself."

Molly McAleer of Mother, May I Sleep With Podcast? was more positive, taking a comedic approach to the film, while arguing that it offered a "surprisingly accurate portrayal of Tumblr and classic Lifetime family disfunction". Kimberly Neil, a writer for Teen Vogue who had previously suffered from anorexia and a relapse into anorexia and laxative abuse after an esophageal tear, agreed that Starving in Suburbia, along with the book Wintergirls, are accurate in their portrayal of healing from anorexia as a chronic, unending process, stating, "healing from an eating disorder is almost as stigmatized in discussion as admitting the problem itself. From books like Wintergirls to movies like Starving in Suburbia, the media presents a consistent message that the process of healing is a continuous, upward journey. I cannot speak for everyone with an eating disorder. I can admit how difficult it has been to tell my story at times, because my illness comes and goes in waves. I’ve yet to experience recovery, full stop."
