= Rattlesnake (2019 film) =

Crime, drama, mystery film

- Film poster
- Directed by: Zak Hilditch
- Written by: Zak Hilditch
- Produced by: Ross M. Dinerstein
- Starring: Carmen Ejogo; Theo Rossi; Emma Greenwell
- Cinematography: Roberto Schaefer
- Edited by: Merlin Eden
- Music by: Ian Hultquist
- Production companies: Campfire; Netflix
- Distributed by: Netflix
- Release date: October 25, 2019
- Running time: 85 minutes
- Country: United States
- Language: English

Rattlesnake is a 2019 American horror drama mystery film written and directed by Zak Hilditch and starring Carmen Ejogo, Theo Rossi and Emma Greenwell. It was released on Netflix on October 25, 2019.

== Plot ==
While stranded in the middle of the desert, Katrina's daughter, Clara, is bitten by a rattlesnake. With no cell service and time running out, Katrina meets a mysterious woman in a trailer who says she'll help. The bite appears to have vanished and when Katrina takes Clara to the hospital, it seems that everything is fine.

The doctor suggests it was just a hallucination. A mysterious man visits Katrina at the hospital to talk about her "payment" for Clara's recovery, declaring her soul was spared and must be repaid; the only conditions being that the soul Katrina takes must be human, and it must be paid on time. He gives her until sunset to repay the debt, otherwise Clara will die from the rattlesnake bite. Katrina doesn't initially believe it, but when she goes back to the desert road, the trailer has disappeared and she sees a trucker with a missing eye, warning her that Clara is going to die.

Katrina discovers that the city of Tulia, Texas where she's ended up has been linked to a series of brutal murders and mysterious disappearances. Any time there's a photo or video of the crime scene, there's a mysterious shadow figure in the background. The man who visited her at the hospital is actually a lawyer who was fatally stabbed by a school teacher with the teacher saying "a soul for a soul" as he stabbed the lawyer, while a child who spooks Katrina actually went missing back in 2010. After an aborted attempt to kill a dying old man in the hospital, Katrina sets her sights on Billy, an abusive boyfriend she sees criticizing his girlfriend in a bar.

She breaks into their home and forces Billy to drive to a remote canyon in the desert. Before Katrina can kill him, though, he fights back and runs away. With time running out before sunset, Katrina prepares to kill herself, but as she films a goodbye message to Clara, Billy hits her with a rock and she blacks out. She wakes up just in time and when Billy is bitten by a rattlesnake, Katrina takes the opportunity to kill him to save her daughter. As she's watched over by mysterious figures on top of the canyon, Katrina leaves the canyon and on the way home, the doctor calls to say Clara is fine.

When Katrina reunites with her daughter, she sees that Clara has drawn a picture of the mysterious figure and the sun, seemingly aware of what her mother had to do. And when the pair get back on the road, Clara spots a hitchhiker by the road, who Katrina sees is actually Billy.

== Cast ==
- Carmen Ejogo as Katrina Ridgeway
- Theo Rossi as Billy
- Emma Greenwell as Abbie
- Richard Lippert as Dying Man
- David Yow as Charlie
- Joy Jacobson as Loraine
- Arianna Ortiz as Francine
- Catherine Haun as Loraine's Sister
- Debrianna Mansini as The Woman
- Sean Dillingham as Dr. Hayes
- Stephanie Hill as Neighbor
- Jenna Doolittle as Female Nurse
- Alexandra Nell as Hiker
- Melissa Chambers as Disheveled Woman
- Tim Stafford as Male Nurse
- Apollonia Pratt as Clara
- Bruce Davis as The Suit/Donald Covington

== Critical response ==
Review aggregator Rotten Tomatoes gave the film a 30% approval rating, based on 20 reviews, with an average rating of 4.4/10. The site's critics' consensus reads: "Carmen Ejogo is stranded in a wasteland both figuratively and literally in this disposable thriller, which lacks the cleverness or specificity to give its thin conceit any bite."

Reviewing the film for RogerEbert.com, Brian Tallerico praised the "game performance from the always-good Carmen Ejogo", but felt that the film's "biggest issue is the pacing" and director Zak Hilditch's failure to "find the tension to keep his story moving."

Writing for The Guardian, Benjamin Lee described the "undeniably talented" Ejogo as "adrift", Hilditch's direction as "bland", and the film overall as "strangely boring".
