= Juanita Jennings =

American actress

- Occupation: Actress
- Years active: 1986–present

Juanita Jennings is an American actress, known for her roles on television. She is known for playing Edna in the TBS sitcom Meet the Browns, Ruby Jones in the Fox drama Star, and Nana Mama in the Prime Video procedural Cross.

== Career ==
Jennings won the 1994 CableACE Award for Supporting Actress in a Movie or Miniseries for her role in Laurel Avenue. She guest-starred in many television series, including The Fresh Prince of Bel-Air, Ellen, Chicago Hope, 7th Heaven, Touched by an Angel, The Practice, Soul Food and Justified. Her stage credits include playing Rose Maxson in South Coast Repertory's production of August Wilson's Fences.

Jennings may best known for her series regular role in the TBS sitcom Meet the Browns as Edna Barnes, which she starred from 2009 to 2011. She had recurring roles in The Division, The Bold and the Beautiful and most notably in the Fox primetime soap opera Star from 2017 to 2019. In 2019, she had a recurring role in the USA Network legal drama Pearson and the Oprah Winfrey Network drama David Makes Man. Starting in 2024, she has appeared as Regina "Nana Mama" Cross in the Prime Video crime drama Cross, based on the novels of James Patterson.

== Filmography ==
=== Film ===
| Year | Title | Role | Notes |
|---|---|---|---|
| 1990 | Running Against Time | Role Unknown | |
| 1991 | The Marla Hanson Story | Prosecutor | |
| 1991 | Bad Attitudes | James' Mother | |
| 1992 | Basic Instinct | Receptionist | |
| 1992 | Condition: Critical | Janine | |
| 1993 | Laurel Avenue | Yolanda Arnett-Friedman | |
| 1993 | Jack Reed: Badge of Honor | Dr. Laura Wheeler | |
| 1993 | Murder of Innocence | Lillian Foster | |
| 1994 | Out of Darkness | Inez | |
| 1994 | On Promised Land | Martha Ree Ween | |
| 1994 | Override | Role Unknown | Short |
| 1997 | Spirit Lost | Vera | |
| 1999 | The Rockford Files: If It Bleeds... It Leads | Helen Picker | |
| 1999 | Things You Can Tell Just by Looking at Her | Nurse (segment "Fantasies About Rebecca") | |
| 2000 | Dancing in September | Ms. Taylor | |
| 2000 | What Women Want | Kitchen Secretary | |
| 2001 | Baby Boy | Rachel | |
| 2003 | Runaway Jury | Loreen Duke | |
| 2004 | Something for Nothing | Mrs. Lassiter | Short |
| 2005 | Shackles | Bella | |
| 2006 | Tootie Pie | Auntie | |
| 2007 | Love... & Other 4 Letter Words | Gigi | |
| 2007 | Daddy's Little Girls | Katheryn | |
| 2008 | Vacancy 2: The First Cut | Doris (video) | |
| 2009 | Janky Promoters | Momma | |
| 2010 | My Girlfriend's Back | Dr. Melinda | |
| 2011 | Midnight Son | Liz | |
| 2013 | Side Effects | Gladys | |
| 2013 | Khumba | Zuki | |

=== Television ===
| Year | Title | Role | Notes |
|---|---|---|---|
| 1986 | St. Elsewhere | Role Unknown | Episode ”The Equalizer” |
| 1986 | Hunter | Dr. Lena Sims | Episode ”The Castro Connection” |
| 1990 | A Different World | Desk Sergeant | Episode ”A Camp Fire Story” |
| 1990 | Lifestories | Laverne Williamson | Episode ”Steve Burdick” |
| 1991 | Matlock | Assistant | Episode ”The Game Show” |
| 1992–1993 | Life Goes On | Detective Davis | Episodes ”The Whole Truth” and “Incident on “Man |
| 1993 | The Fresh Prince of Bel-Air | Nurse | Episode ”The Baby Comes Out” |
| 1993 | Crossroads | T.A. Pennebaker | Episode ”The Nickel Curves” |
| 1993 | Roc | Miss Hawkins | Episode ”Shove it Up Your Asprin” |
| 1994 | All American Girl | Carolyn | Episode ”Who’s the Boss” |
| 1995 | CBS Schoolbreak Special | Mrs. Bing | Episode ”What About Your Friends” |
| 1995 | The Client | Opal Garrett | One Episode: The Burning of Atlanta |
| 1995 | Beverly Hills, 90210 | Mrs. Holcomb | Episode ”Fortunate Son” |
| 1996 | Picket Fences | Gloria | Episode ”The Z Files” |
| 1996 | Sister, Sister | Ms. Dadier | Episode “Summer Bummer” |
| 1996 | Ellen | Therapist | Episode ”The Bubble Gum Incident” |
| 1997 | Life's Work | Judge Cowan | Episode ”Fraud” |
| 1997 | Sparks | Mrs. Clark | Episode ”Too Hot Not to Cool Down” |
| 1997 | Suddenly Susan | Ms. Hollins | Episode ”Truth and Consequences” |
| 1997 | Chicago Hope | Rebecca Rosen | Two Episodes: The Adventures of Baron Von Munchausen... by Proxy and All in the Family |
| 1998 | The Pretender | Alice Evans | Episode ”Giggolo Jared” |
| 1998 | Buffy the Vampire Slayer | Dr. Wilkinson | Episode ”Killed by Death |
| 1999 | Crusade | Lieutenant Carr | One Episode: Ruling from the Tomb |
| 1999 | 7th Heaven | Cynthia | One Episode: Come Drive with Me |
| 2000 | City of Angels | Marsha | One Episode: Prototype |
| 2000 | 18 Wheels of Justice | Lillian Haybrook | One Episode: The Fire Next Time |
| 2000 | Touched by an Angel | Warden Davis | One Episode: True Confessions |
| 2000 | Felicity | Pastor Kathy | One Episode: And to All a Good Night |
| 2000–2003 | The Practice | Claire Stevens and Marcia Hodges | Two Episodes: Till Death Do Us Part and The Making of a Trial Attorney |
| 2000–2006 | ER | Mrs. Davis and ICU Doctor | Two Episodes: Family Matters and Darfur |
| 2001 | Judging Amy | Elsie | One Episode: The Claw Is Our Master |
| 2001 | Kate Brasher | Delores | One Episode: Kate |
| 2001 | That's My Bush! | Ms. Clea | One Episode: Eenie, Meenie, Miney, MURDER! |
| 2001 | The Guardian | Edna | One Episode: Lolita? |
| 2001 | The District | Mrs. Broyles | One Episode: To Serve and Protect |
| 2002 | Frasier | Suzy | One Episode: The Proposal |
| 2002 | The Division | Dr. Donna Morella | Four Episodes: Farewell My Lovelies, Long Day's Journey, Before the Deluge and Sweet Sorrow |
| 2003 | Without a Trace | Delores | One Episode: No Mas |
| 2004 | Soul Food | Vivian Chadway, Kenny's Mother | One Episode: The Son Also Rises |
| 2005–2006 | Family Guy | Miss Clifton | Episodes: Fast Times at Buddy Cianci Jr. High and Saving Private Brian |
| 2006 | Scrubs | Dr. Marston | One Episode: My Extra Mile |
| 2006 | American Dad! | Woman | One Episode: Helping Handis |
| 2007 | The Bold and the Beautiful | Dorothy Bascomb | Eleven Episodes: |
| 2007–2008 | Lincoln Heights | Mama Taylor/Momma Taylor | Five Episodes: Manchild, Grown Folks' Business, The Old Man and the G, The Vision and Disarmed |
| 2009–2011 | Meet the Browns | Edna/Edna Barnes | Series regular, 140 episodes |
| 2010 | Detroit 1-8-7 | Sally Elliston | One Episode: Nobody's Home/Unknown Soldier |
| 2011 | Justified | Rachel's Mother | One Episode: For Blood or Money |
| 2011 | Torchwood | Bisme Katusi | One Episode: Escape to L.A. |
| 2013 | Shameless | Mama Kamala | Season 3, Episode 6: Cascading Failures, Season 3, Episode 7: A Long Way From Home |
| 2015 | Major Crimes | Amira's Grandma | One Episode: Snitch |
| 2017–2019 | Star | Ruby | Recurring Role |
| 2018 | Here and Now | Gwendolyn Williams | One Episode: Wake |
| 2018 | Suits | Lillian Cook | Episode: "Good-Bye" |
| 2018 | Detroiters | Mrs. Duvet | Two Episodes: Happy Birthday Mr. Duvet and Duvet Family Reunion |
| 2019 | Pearson | Lillian Cook | Recurring role, 8 episodes |
| 2019 | David Makes Man | Mrs. Hertrude | Recurring role, 8 episodes |
| 2024 | Cross | Regina Cross | 8 episodes |
| 2025 | Watson | Elizabeth Morstan | Episode: "A Son in the Oven" |
