= Danny Cannon =

English film director (born 1968)

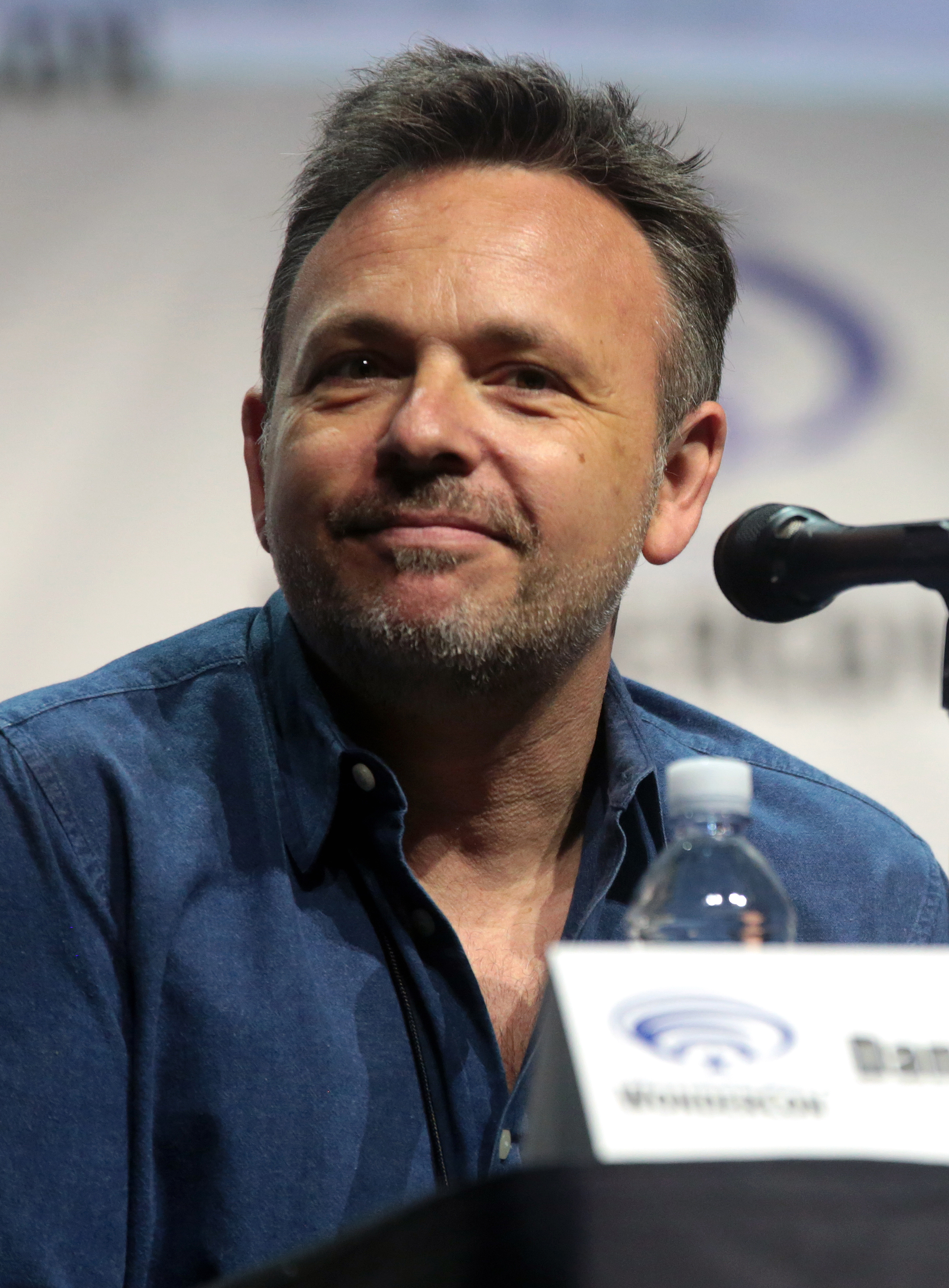
- Cannon at the 2017 WonderCon.
- Born: Daniel John Cannon; 5 October 1968 (age 58); Luton, England
- Occupations: Director; executive producer; screenwriter
- Years active: 1984–present
- Known for: CSI: Crime Scene Investigation; Gotham; Pennyworth; Nikita; Judge Dredd; I Still Know What You Did Last Summer

Daniel John Cannon (born 5 October 1968) is a British film and television producer, director and writer, known for executive producing the 15-season CSI: Crime Scene Investigation series franchise (and directed multiple episodes including the series pilot), and simultaneously executive producing the CSI: Miami and CSI: NY spin-offs.

From 2014 to 2019, for the show's duration, Cannon executive produced, wrote and directed Fox's Gotham, which won the 2014 Critics Choice Award for Most Exciting New Series and received 11 Emmy nominations (one win). In July 2019, his newest television production, Pennyworth, which Cannon co-created and executive produced with Bruno Heller, premiered on Epix, concluding in November 2022 on HBO Max.

As a TV entertainment figure and a rare TV pilot director who also works as a key writer, Cannon has directed 15 television pilots, 12 of which have been ordered to series, including: Training Day (2017), Gotham (2014), The Tomorrow People (2013), Nikita (2010), Dark Blue (2009), The Forgotten (2009), and Eleventh Hour (2008). At one time, Cannon had five television series on-air, while acting as executive producer.

Feature film directorial credits include Geostorm (2017), I Still Know What You Did Last Summer (1998), Judge Dredd (1995), and The Young Americans (1993).

== Career ==
=== Early career ===
Cannon began making films at the age of 16 in 1984, and started a youth experimental theatre group at 33 Arts Centre making video dramas with a number of other directors in different roles, including cameraman. A major influence was the centre's video maker, Dermot Byrne, with whom Cannon worked on a number of projects. Aged 23, he met musician David Arnold who played in a band that rehearsed there. Cannon convinced Arnold to compose soundtracks for his and other people's videos. Arnold's first professional score was for Cannon's debut feature 'The Young Americans'.

In 1987, he won the BBC Young Filmmaker of the Year Award, by Alan Parker, with a 40-minute short called Sometimes. 1988-1990 he attended the National Film and Television School. His intermediate film, 'Play Dead' was screened on Channel 4 while his graduation film Strangers (1990) appeared at the Edinburgh International Film Festival.

=== 1990s ===
Cannon worked on commercials for James Garrett and later RSA, and made his debut feature The Young Americans in 1993. His second film, the big-budget Sylvester Stallone feature Judge Dredd, released in 1995, was a commercial disappointment and was not well received critically. In 1998 he directed two features, the teen slasher film I Still Know What You Did Last Summer and he directed Ray Liotta, Anjelica Huston and Jeremy Piven in Phoenix.

=== 2000s ===
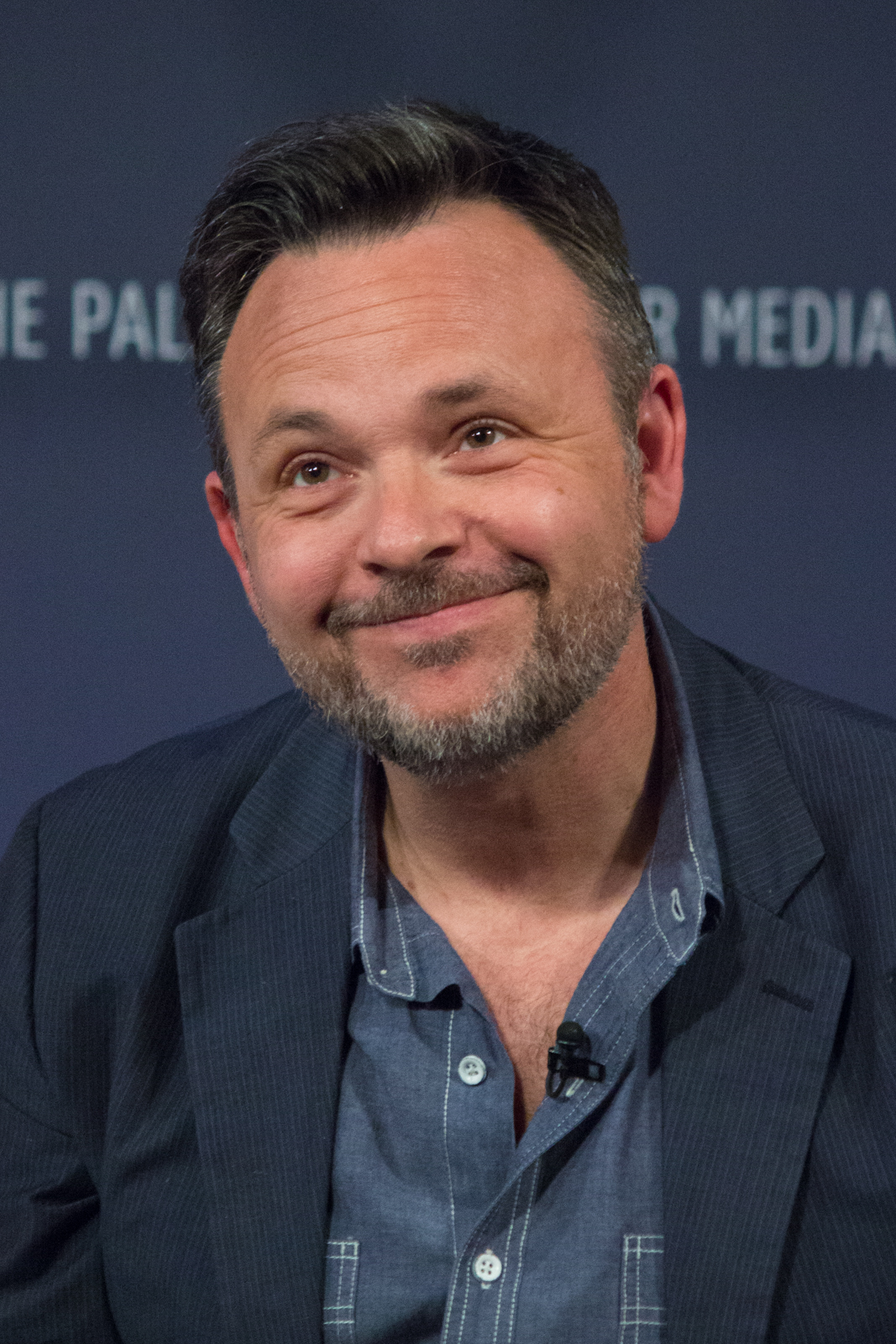
Cannon at the 2014 NY PaleyFest for Gotham.

Cannon's immersion into primetime television began when he was hired by Jerry Bruckheimer to produce and direct the pilot episode of CSI: Crime Scene Investigation in 2000. Cannon is credited with creating the look and visual style of the CSI, which ran for 15 seasons, earning a total of 39 Emmy nominations and spawning three spinoff shows. He went on to write and direct many episodes of the flagship series, while overseeing the production as executive producer. Simultaneously, he also executive produced both CSI: Miami, which premiered in 2002 (and directed the pilot of), and CSI: NY (2004).

Stemming from his personal passion and experience with the sport of football, in 2005, Cannon directed the film Goal!.

In 2006, he returned to television with the CBS television pilot, Capital Law, about a group of legal associates trying to make partner at a powerful Washington, D.C.–based law firm.

In 2007, Cannon co-created TNT's crime drama series starring Dylan McDermott called Dark Blue and directed the pilot episode. The following year he produced and directed 'The Eleventh Hour' for CBS, which ran for one season.

In 2010, Cannon joined The CW action series Nikita, as director and executive producer. It successfully ran for four seasons on the network.

In 2011, he executive produced and directed the pilot Fox crime/mystery series Alcatraz along with J. J. Abrams for WBTV.

In 2016, Cannon was brought on to direct reshoots for the feature film Geostorm, in an attempt to help save the studios over budget production.

In 2017, Cannon replaced feature film director Antoine Fuqua for a TV version of Fuqua's film Training Day, starring Bill Paxton, based on the 2001 Denzel Washington feature film. He stayed on as the show's executive producer.

From 2014 to 2018, Cannon executive produced the television series Gotham, for which he directed the pilot of, along with writing and directing several episodes during the series' five-year run. Under Cannon's creative guidance, the show has been nominated for 11 Primetime Emmy Awards, and in 2017 won its first Emmy for Outstanding Special and Visual Effects in a Supporting Role.

In 2018, it was announced that Gotham would produce its fifth and final season, which premiered in 2019.

Partnering with his Gotham writer-producer partner Bruno Heller, Cannon is currently producing Pennyworth, a Batman-esque prequel set in 1960s London, which documents the early years of Batman's butler Alfred Pennyworth. Cannon executive produces and writes along with Heller, and has directed multiple episodes, including the series premiere, which have aired on Epix.

== Filmography ==
=== Film ===
Year	Title	Director	Writer	Notes
1991	Strangers	Yes	Yes	Graduation Film
1993	The Young Americans	Yes	Yes	
1995	Judge Dredd	Yes		
1998	Phoenix	Yes		
1998	I Still Know What You Did Last Summer	Yes		
2005	Goal! The Dream Begins	Yes		
2017	Geostorm	Reshoots		Also executive producer

=== Television ===
Year	Title	Director	Executive Producer	Writer	Notes
2000–2006	CSI: Crime Scene Investigation	Yes	Yes	Yes	Director (25 episodes), writer (11 episodes)
2002–2005	CSI: Miami	Yes	Yes		Episodes "Blood Brothers" and "MIA/NYC NonStop"
2004–2011	CSI: NY		Yes		64 episodes
2006	Justice	Yes			Episode "Shark Week"
2008–2009	Eleventh Hour	Yes	Yes		Director (3 episodes)
2009–2010	The Forgotten	Yes	Yes		Episode "Pilot"
2009–2010	Dark Blue	Yes	Yes	Yes	Also creator; Director (5 episodes), writer (20 episodes)
2010	Miami Medical	Yes			Episode "All Fall Down"
2010–2013	Nikita	Yes	Yes		Director (6 episodes)
2012	Alcatraz	Yes	Yes		Episode "Pilot"
2013	Shameless	Yes			Episode "Where There's a Will"
2013–2014	The Tomorrow People	Yes	Yes		Director (3 episodes)
2014	The Lottery	Yes	Yes		Episode "Pilot"
2014–2019	Gotham	Yes	Yes	Yes	Director (11 episodes), writer (11 episodes), composer (33 episodes)
2017	Training Day	Yes	Yes		Directed episode "Apocalypse Now"; Also consulting producer
2019–2022	Pennyworth	Yes	Yes	Yes	Director (3 episodes)
2023	Gotham Knights	Yes	Yes		Directed episode "Pilot"

TV movies

- Capitol Law (2006)
- The Cure (2007)

== Awards and nominations ==
Year	Award	Category	Nominated work	Result
2019	ASC Award	Outstanding Achievement in Cinematography in Episode of a Series	Gotham	Nominated
2018	ASC Award	Outstanding Achievement in Cinematography in Episode of a Series	Gotham	Nominated
2018	Emmy Award	Outstanding Special Visual Effects	Gotham	Nominated
2018	Teen Choice Award	Choice TV Action Show	Gotham	Nominated
2018	Saturn Award	Best Superhero Adaptation Television Series	Gotham	Nominated
2017	American Society of Cinematographers	Outstanding Achievement in Cinematography in Episode of a Series	Gotham	Nominated
2017	Emmy Award	Outstanding Sound Editing for a Series	Gotham	Nominated
2017	Emmy Award	Outstanding Special Visual Effects in a Supporting Role	Gotham	Won
2017	Emmy Award	Outstanding Stunt Coordination for a Drama Series, Limited Series, or Movie	Gotham	Nominated
2017	Teen Choice Award	Choice TV Action Show	Gotham	Nominated
2017	Saturn Award	Best Superhero Adaptation Television Series	Gotham	Nominated
2016	American Society of Cinematographers	Television Movie, Miniseries or Pilot	Gotham	Nominated
2016	Art Directors Guild	Excellence in Production Design - One Hour Period or Fantasy Single-Camera Television Series	Gotham	Nominated
2016	Emmy Award	Outstanding Cinematography for a Single-Camera Series	Gotham	Nominated
2016	Emmy Award	Outstanding Sound Editing for a Series	Gotham	Nominated
2016	Emmy Award	Outstanding Stunt Coordination for a Drama Series, Limited Series, or Movie	Gotham	Nominated
2016	People's Choice Award	Favorite TV Drama	Gotham	Nominated
2016	Teen Choice Award	Choice TV Show: Drama	Gotham	Nominated
2016	Saturn Award	Best Superhero Adaptation Television Series	Gotham	Nominated
2015	ASC Award	Outstanding Achievement in Cinematography in Television Movie/Mini-Series/Pilot	Gotham	Nominated
2015	ASC Award	Outstanding Achievement in Cinematography in Episode of a Series	Gotham	Nominated
2015	Art Directors Guild	Excellence in Production Design - One Hour Period or Fantasy Single-Camera Television Series	Gotham	Nominated
2015	Emmy Award	Outstanding Costumes for a Contemporary Series, Limited Series or Movie	Gotham	Nominated
2015	Emmy Award	Outstanding Special Visual Effects in a Supporting Role	Gotham	Nominated
2015	Emmy Award	Outstanding Production Design for a Narrative Contemporary or Fantasy Program (One Hour or More)	Gotham	Nominated
2015	Emmy Award	Outstanding Sound Editing for a Series	Gotham	Nominated
2015	Gracie Award	Outstanding Drama	Gotham	Won
2015	Kids' Choice Award	Favorite Family TV Show	Gotham	Nominated
2015	People's Choice Award	Favorite New TV Drama	Gotham	Nominated
2015	Saturn Award	Best Superhero Adaptation Television Series	Gotham	Nominated
2014	Critics Choice Awards	Most Exciting New Series	Gotham	Won
2014	TV Guide Award	Favorite New Show	Gotham	Nominated
2013	Teen Choice Award	Choice TV Show: Action	Nikita	Nominated
2012	Teen Choice Award	Choice TV Show: Action	Nikita	Nominated
2011	People's Choice Award	Favorite New TV Drama	Nikita	Nominated
2006	ASC Award	Outstanding Achievement in Cinematography in Episode of a Series	CSI: Crime Scene Investigation	Won
2006	People's Choice Award	Favorite Television Drama	CSI: Crime Scene Investigation	Won
2005	ASC Award	Outstanding Achievement in Cinematography in Episode of a Series	CSI: Crime Scene Investigation	Won
2005	People's Choice Awards	Favorite Television Drama	CSI: Crime Scene Investigation	Won
2005	PGA Award	Outstanding Producer of Episodic Television - Drama	CSI: Crime Scene Investigation	Nominated
2004	Golden Globe Award	Best Television Series – Drama	CSI: Crime Scene Investigation	Nominated
2004	People's Choice Award	Favorite Television Dramatic Series	CSI: Crime Scene Investigation	Won
2004	PGA Award	Outstanding Producer of Episodic Television - Drama	CSI: Crime Scene Investigation	Nominated
2004	Emmy Award	Outstanding Drama Series	CSI: Crime Scene Investigation	Nominated
2004	Saturn Award	Best Network Television Series	CSI: Crime Scene Investigation	Nominated
2003	American Society of Cinematographers	Outstanding Achievement in Cinematography in Movies of the Week/Pilot (Network)	CSI: Miami	Won
2003	People's Choice Award	Favorite Television Dramatic Series	CSI: Crime Scene Investigation	Won
2003	Emmy Award	Outstanding Drama Series	CSI: Crime Scene Investigation	Nominated
2003	Satellite Award	Best Television Series, Drama	CSI: Crime Scene Investigation	Won
2003	Saturn Award	Best Network Television Series	CSI: Crime Scene Investigation	Won
2002	Golden Globe Award	Best Television Series – Drama	CSI: Crime Scene Investigation	Nominated
2002	Emmy Award	Outstanding Drama Series	CSI: Crime Scene Investigation	Nominated
2002	Television Critics Award	Outstanding Achievement in Drama	CSI: Crime Scene Investigation	Nominated
2001	Golden Globe Award	Best Television Series – Drama	CSI: Crime Scene Investigation	Nominated
2001	PGA Award	Vision Award (Television)	CSI: Crime Scene Investigation	Won
2001	Television Critics Award	Outstanding Achievement in Drama	CSI: Crime Scene Investigation	Nominated
2001	Television Critics Award	Outstanding New Program of the Year	CSI: Crime Scene Investigation	Nominated
2001	TV Guide Award	New Series of the Year	CSI: Crime Scene Investigation	Won
1996	Saturn Award	Best Science Fiction Film	Judge Dredd	Nominated
1996	Saturn Award	Best Special Effects	Judge Dredd	Nominated
1995	Universe Reader's Choice Award	Best Director for a Genre Motion Picture	Judge Dredd	Won

== Personal life ==
Cannon has two daughters. He plays football regularly with Hollywood United F.C., a local Los Angeles club team consisting of mostly celebrities and former professional footballers, who play socially against other local teams for friendly matches and charity events.
