= Sunkrish Bala =

American actor (born 1984)

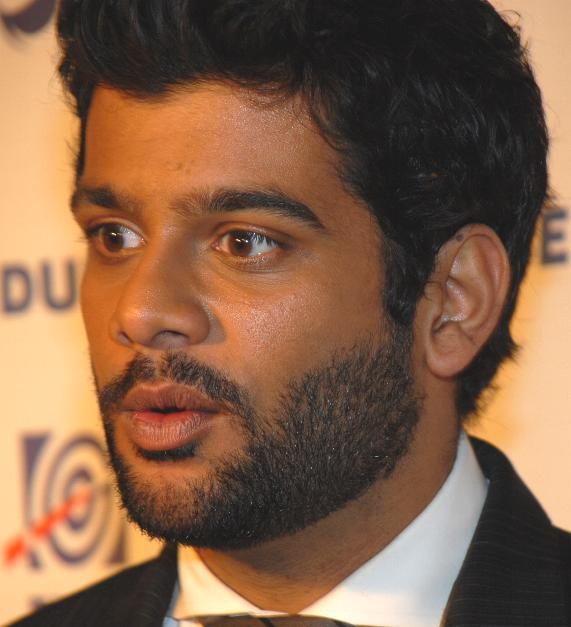
- Bala at the 12th Satellite Awards
- Born: Sunkrish Balasubramanian; 24 May 1984 (age 42); Mumbai, India
- Citizenship: United States
- Education: UCLA School of Theater, Film and Television
- Occupation: Actor
- Years active: 2005–present

Sunkrish Balasubramanian (born May 21, 1984) is an Indian American actor.

== Early life and career ==
Sunkrish Balasubramanian was born in Mumbai, India, and is of Tamil descent. However, he moved with his family to San Jose, California, as a child, where he grew up. He graduated from Bellarmine College Preparatory, San Jose, California in 2002 and from the UCLA School of Theater, Film and Television 2006. Even before graduating from university, he landed guest roles in the series Will & Grace and Grey's Anatomy, despite skipping theatre classes to film and having no experience acting in television series. Also, while still a student, he landed his first leading role in the small series Nine Months. The series lasted only one season.

From 2007–2008, Bala was a series regular on the ABC comedy Notes from the Underbelly portraying the role of Eric. Bala was also a series regular on the MTV series I Just Want My Pants Back in the role of Bobby. The show was cancelled after one season. Bala had recurring roles as Dr. Caleb Subramanian on The Walking Dead and Vikram Singh on Castle.

== Filmography ==
=== Film ===
Year	Title	Role	Notes
2006	American Blend	Brijesh "BJ"	
2008	Get Smart's Bruce and Lloyd Out of Control	Upside Down Guy	
2009	Albino Farm	Sanjay	
2010	Starstruck	Dr. Sanjay Lad	TV movie
2010	Another Harvest Moon	Paul	
2011	Big Mike	Naveen Patel	TV movies
2012	The Secret Lives of Wives	Clay	TV movies
2014	Hollows Grove	Roger Rafkin	
2014	Meet the Patels	Himself	
2016	Killing Poe	Ashbir Brathwaite	
2016	Chee and T	Chee	
2016	The Thinning	Dr. Patel	
2024	When Billie Met Lisa	Band Member	Short

=== Television ===
Year	Title	Role	Notes
2005	CSI: NY	Alex	1 episode
2005	Barbershop	Bashir	Recurring role, 4 episodes: "Get Your Hand Out of My Womb" (season 1: episode 1) "Madonna Is a Ho" (season 1: episode 3) "What's Good for the Cos..." (season 1: episode 5) "The Politics of Money" (season 1: episode 9)
2005	Criminal Minds	Jordan	1 episode
2005	Will & Grace	Gerald	1 episode
2005	Grey's Anatomy	Steve Murphy	2 episodes: "Thanks for the Memories" (season 2: episode 9) "Much Too Much" (season 2: episode 10)
2005, 2007	My Name Is Earl	Doctor	2 episodes: "Teacher Earl" (season 1: episode 5) "Two Balls, Two Strikes" (season 2: episode 20)
2006	Huff	Student #2	1 episode
2006	Vanished	Ballistics Tech	1 episode
2006	Damages		Completed
2007–2008	Notes from the Underbelly	Eric	Season 1-2 (series regular; 23 episodes)
2009	Body Politic	Zeke	Unaired Pilot
2009	Bones	Buddy Shirazi	1 episode
2009	Lie to Me	Arun Ashraf	1 episode
2010	Brothers & Sisters	Lewis	1 episode
2010	Day One	Jamil	1 episode
2011	Harry's Law	Dr. Max Richards	1 episode
2011–2012	Awkward	Dr. Mishra	Recurring role, 4 episodes: "Pilot" (season 1: episode 1) "The Scarlet Eye" (season 1: episode 4) "Fateful" (season 1: episode 12) "Homewrecker Hamilton" (season 2: episode 9)
2011–2012	I Just Want My Pants Back	Bobby	Season 1 (series regular; 12 episodes)
2013	Shameless	Andy	3 episodes: "Where There's a Will" (season 3: episode 8) "Frank the Plumber" (season 3: episode 9) "Order Room Service" (season 3: episode 11)
2013	Mistresses	Hamid	1 episode
2013	Body of Proof	Sanjit Singh	1 episode
2013	Austin & Ally	Roger Dunlap	1 episode
2013	The Walking Dead	Dr. Caleb Subramanian	4 episodes
2014	Modern Family	Daryl	Episode: "Haley's 21st Birthday"
2014	Switched at Birth	Mr. Z	Episode: "Girl on the Cliff"
2015	Scorpion	Jim	Episode: "Cliffhanger"
2015–2016	Castle	Vikram Singh	9 episodes
2023–present	Beavis and Butt-Head	Doctor, Aggro Dude and Aggro Dude's friend (voice)	2 episodes
2023–present	Unicorn: Warriors Eternal	Rakshasa (voice)	2 episodes
2025	Creature Commandos	Hallway Jerk #2, Police Officer #2 (voice)	Episode: "A Very Funny Monster"
2025	Devil May Cry	King (voice)	
2026-present	Avatar: Seven Havens	Rehan, Various voices (voice)	

=== Video games ===
Year	Title	Role	Notes
2014	Transistor	Royce	
2018	Fallout 76	Marcus Taylor, Niraj Singh, Garry Wilkins, Additional Voices	
2024	Teenage Mutant Ninja Turtles: Mutants Unleashed	Sai Modi	
