= Laura Slade Wiggins =

American actress, singer and musician

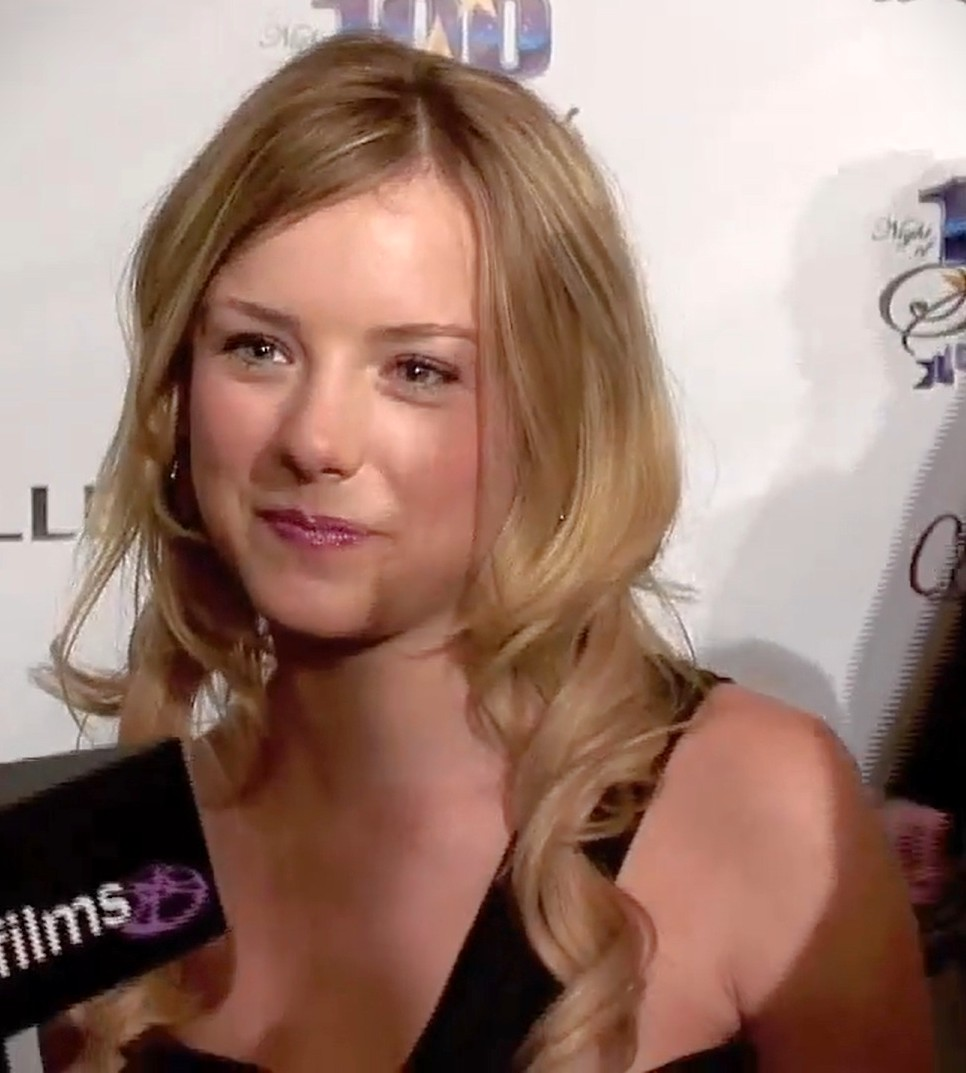
- Wiggins in 2011
- Occupations: Actress; singer; musician
- Years active: 2006–present
- Spouse: Kyle Weishaar (m. 2018)
- Children: 2

Laura Slade Wiggins is an American actress and singer. She had her breakthrough role on the Showtime television series Shameless (2011-2013), where she played Karen Jackson, a self-destructive teenager. While Wiggins was a main cast member in seasons one and two, she continued in a recurring role in the third season.

After Shameless, Wiggins continued her television career with a recurring role on the science fiction series The Tomorrow People (2013). In film, Wiggins has appeared in Starving in Suburbia (2014), 20th Century Women (2016), Rings (2017), Nancy Drew and the Hidden Staircase (2019), and is the leading actress in the Canadian musical film Stand! (2019). As a singer, Wiggins made her debut with the extended play Clementine (2012).

== Early life ==
Wiggins is the daughter of Kathy Wiggins and prominent Athens attorney Mark Wiggins. She has one brother.

== Career ==
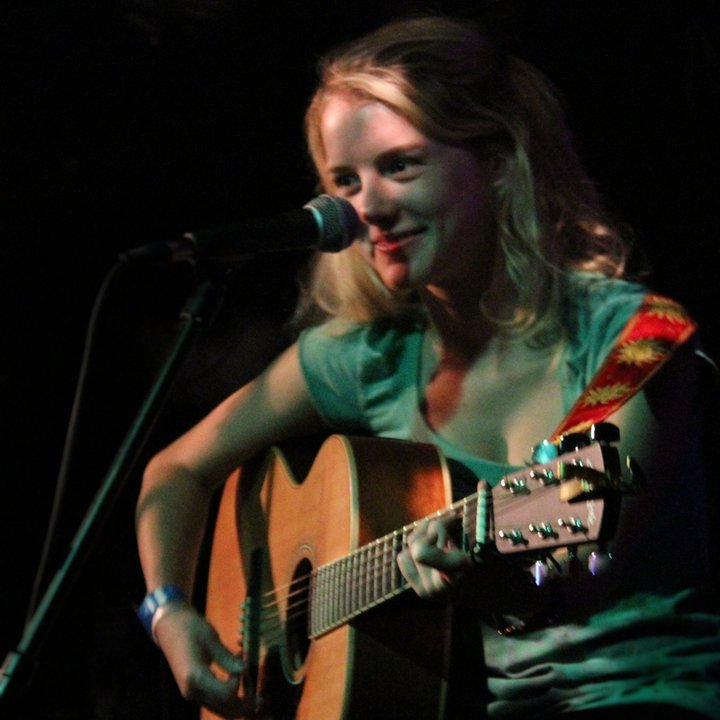
Wiggins playing and singing in 2010

She has guest starred in various shows including Eleventh Hour, and in an episode of CSI: Crime Scene Investigation titled "World's End". She also played a pregnant teenager in an episode of the fourth season of Private Practice called "The Hardest Part". She had a recurring role in the 2013 series The Tomorrow People. From 2011 to 2013, Wiggins appeared in her first significant role as a series regular in the Showtime black comedy series Shameless as the troubled promiscuous teenager Karen Jackson, the daughter to agoraphobic Sheila (Joan Cusack) and a love interest to Lip Gallagher (Jeremy Allen White). Wiggins was a part of the main cast in seasons one and two, and had a recurring role in season three. On the frequent nudity featured throughout Shameless and Karen’s promiscuous characterization, Wiggins stated, “One of the things I like about Shameless is that the women are extremely sexual and up front with their emotions.”

In 2012, Wiggins was cast as the co-lead in William D. MacGillivray’s coming of age drama film Hard Drive, which premiered in 2014. She portrays Debs, a runaway harboring a secret past. Wiggins subsequently had a leading role as a girl struggling with an eating disorder in the Lifetime television film Starving in Suburbia (2014).

In 2014, Wiggins appeared in the Law & Order: Special Victims Unit episode "Comic Perversion" as Carly Rydell. In 2017, Wiggins appeared in the horror film Rings, the third installment of the Ring franchise. Wiggins was cast in the supporting role of Faith. Her boyfriend, who worked in the film's stunt department, told her the role hadn't been cast yet. In 2019, she played a supporting role in the Nancy Drew and the Hidden Staircase.

Wiggins had a leading role as Rebecca Almazoff in the Canadian musical film Stand! (2019), a film adaptation of the stage musical Strike! (2005). On the film’s themes, Wiggins stated, "The story is very much needed in the States right now because we’re really having a hard time understanding that we were all immigrants once. We have this immigrant-phobia now. This story is about how all people should be treated the way you would want to be treated." Neil Weisensel of The Globe and Mail praised Wiggins' performance in a "complex ingenue role."

== Personal life ==
Wiggins married stuntman Kyle Weishaar in Colbert, Georgia on June 23, 2018.

== Filmography ==
=== Film ===
Year	Title	Role	Notes
2008	Dance of the Dead	BFF #1	
2011	Day of the Living	Amy	Short film
2012	Hit List	13-yr old Charlotte	
2014	The Ganzfeld Haunting	Molloy	
2014	Hard Drive	Debs	
2016	Take Flight	Grace	
2016	20th Century Women	Lynette Winters	
2017	Rings	Faith	
2017	Cradle Swapping	Michelle	
2017	Jax In Love	Daisy	Short film
2019	Nancy Drew and the Hidden Staircase	Helen Corning	
2019	Stand!	Rebecca Almazoff	
2019	Along Came the Devil 2	Jordan	
2020	InstaPsycho	Maddie Reynolds	

=== Television ===
Year	Title	Role	Notes
2006	Not Like Everyone Else	Kimberly	Television film
2007	Girl, Positive	Lindsey Carter	Television film
2008	Eleventh Hour	Belinda Shea	Episode: "Flesh"
2010–2014	CSI: Crime Scene Investigation	Zoe Tate / Singer #4	Episode: "Dead Rails" (as Zoe Tate), Episode: "World's End (as Singer #4)
2011	Private Practice	Lisa	Episode: "The Hardest Part"
2011	Cooper and Stone	Maya	Television film
2011–2013	Shameless	Karen Jackson	30 episodes
2012	The Finder	Claire	Episode: "Eye of the Storm"
2012	Blackbox TV	Monica Stratford	Episode: "Silverwood: Red Ink"
2013	Perception	Patti Walace	Episode: "Toxic"
2013	The Cheating Pact	Meredith Porter	Television film
2013–2014	The Tomorrow People	Irene Quinn	5 episodes
2014	Law & Order: Special Victims Unit	Carly Rydell	Episode: "Comic Perversion"
2014	Intelligence	Rebecca Strand	Episode: "Cain and Gabriel"
2014	Starving in Suburbia	Hannah Warner	Television film
2015	Comedy Sketch TV Time, Okay?	Siri	Episode: "Holographic iPhone Siri"
2017	Chicago P.D.	Juliana Parks	Episode: "Remember the Devil"
