= Emma Greenwell =

American-born English actress (born 1989)

- Born: January 14, 1989 (age 37); Greenwich, Connecticut, U.S.
- Occupation: Actress
- Years active: 2012–2019
- Children: 1

Emma Greenwell (born 14 January 1989) is an American-born English former actress. She made her acting debut in 2012 with a five season run (2012–2016) as Mandy Milkovich on the Showtime comedy-drama Shameless, credited in the main cast for two seasons. Greenwell also appeared as a series regular on the Hulu drama The Path (2016–2018) and was the title character of the 2019 Starz miniseries The Rook. As of 2026, her last appearance was in the 2019 streaming television movie Rattlesnake.

== Personal life ==
Greenwell was born 14 January 1989 in New York, to a French mother and an English father. The family moved back to London's South Kensington neighbourhood before her second birthday. She attended the London Academy of Music and Dramatic Art for a year, but quit to pursue a career in Los Angeles. Just four days before her scheduled return to London, the then-22-year-old landed her first acting job, portraying Mandy Milkovich on the Showtime drama Shameless.

Greenwell and her husband married in May 2021; the couple have a child together, born in November 2021.

== Filmography ==
=== Film ===
Year	Film	Role	Notes
2013	Holy Ghost People	Charlotte	
2015	Dare to Be Wild	Mary Reynolds	
2016	Pride and Prejudice and Zombies	Caroline Bingley	
2016	Love & Friendship	Catherine Vernon	
2016	Duet	Janelle	
2019	Rattlesnake	Abbie	

=== Television ===
Year	Title	Role	Notes
2012	True Blood	Claudia	3 episodes
2012–2016	Shameless	Mandy Milkovich	Recurring role (season 2), main cast (seasons 3–4), episodes (seasons 5–6)
2014	Law & Order: Special Victims Unit	Ellie Porter	Episode: "Spring Awakening"
2016–2018	The Path	Mary Cox	Supporting cast
2019	The Rook	Myfanwy Thomas	Title role
