= 10th Independent Spirit Awards =

US film awards ceremony in 1995

- Date: March 25, 1995
- Site: Santa Monica, California, U.S.
- Hosted by: Kevin Pollak

Highlights
- Best Film: Pulp Fiction
- Most awards: Pulp Fiction (4)
- Most nominations: Eat Drink Man Woman (6)

The 10th Independent Spirit Awards, honoring the best in independent filmmaking for 1994, were announced on March 25, 1995. Hosted by Kevin Pollak, it was the second ceremony to be held under a tent in a parking lot on the beach in Santa Monica.

== Winners and nominees ==
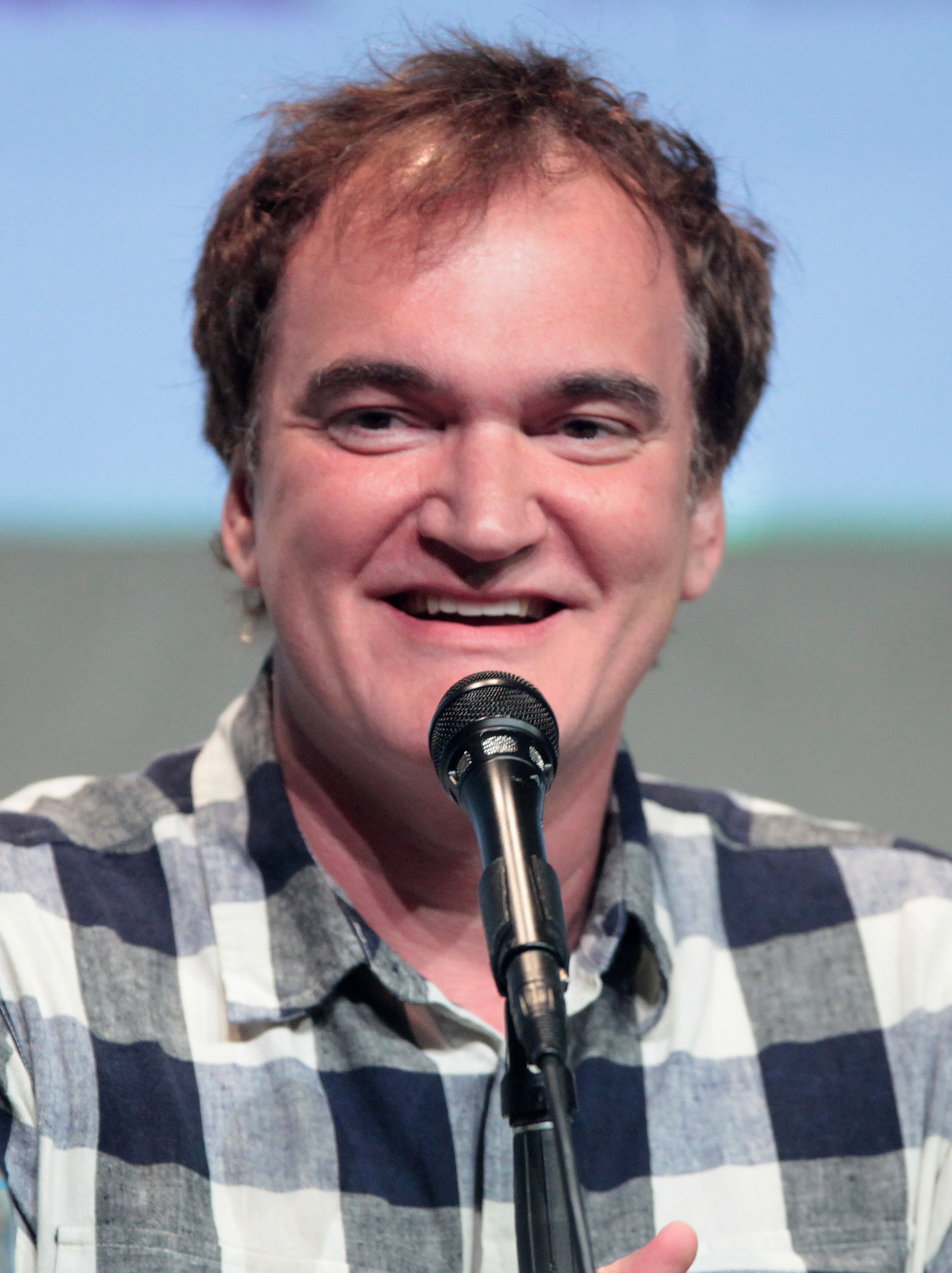
Quentin Tarantino, Best Director and Best Screenplay co-winner

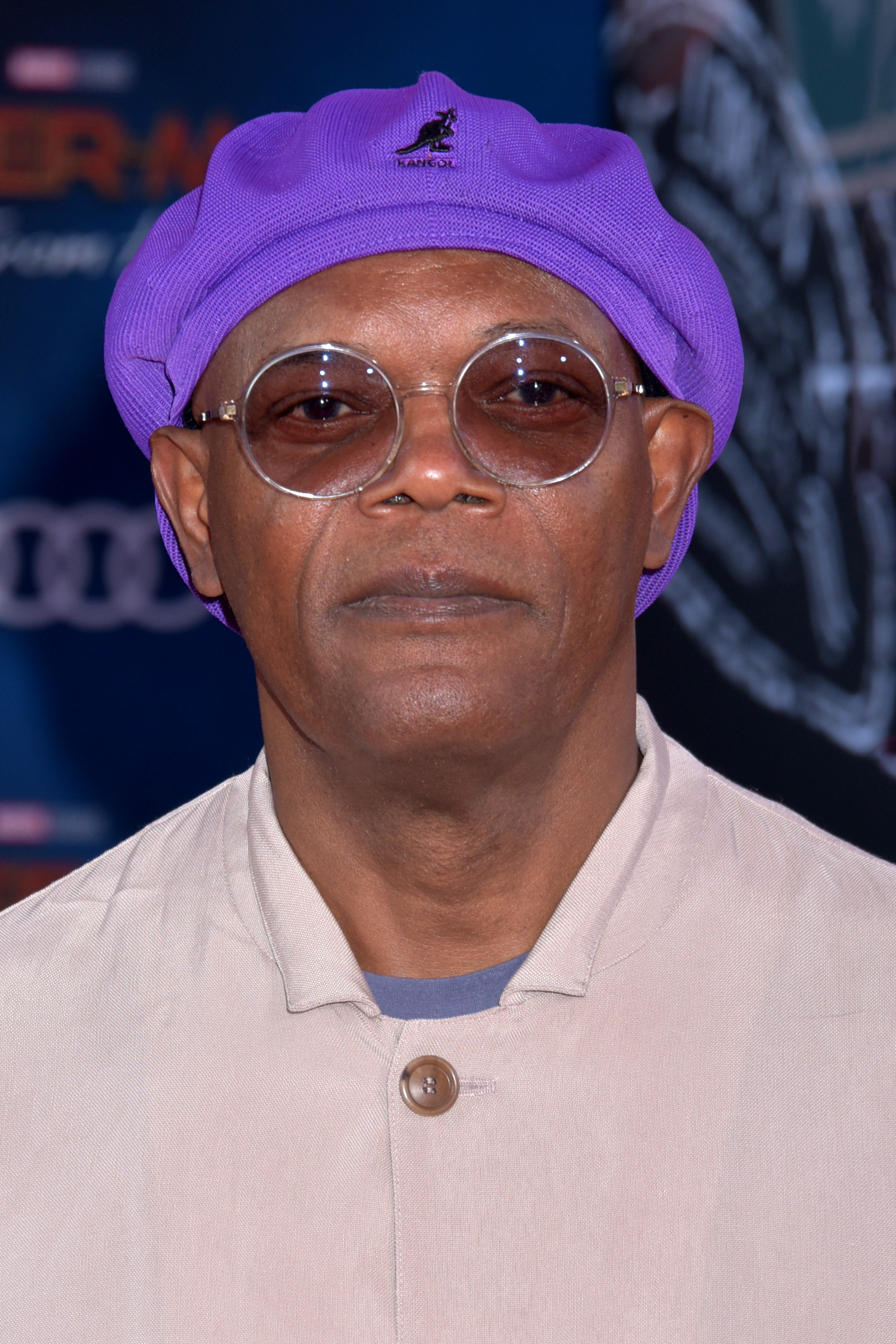
Samuel L. Jackson, Best Male Lead winner

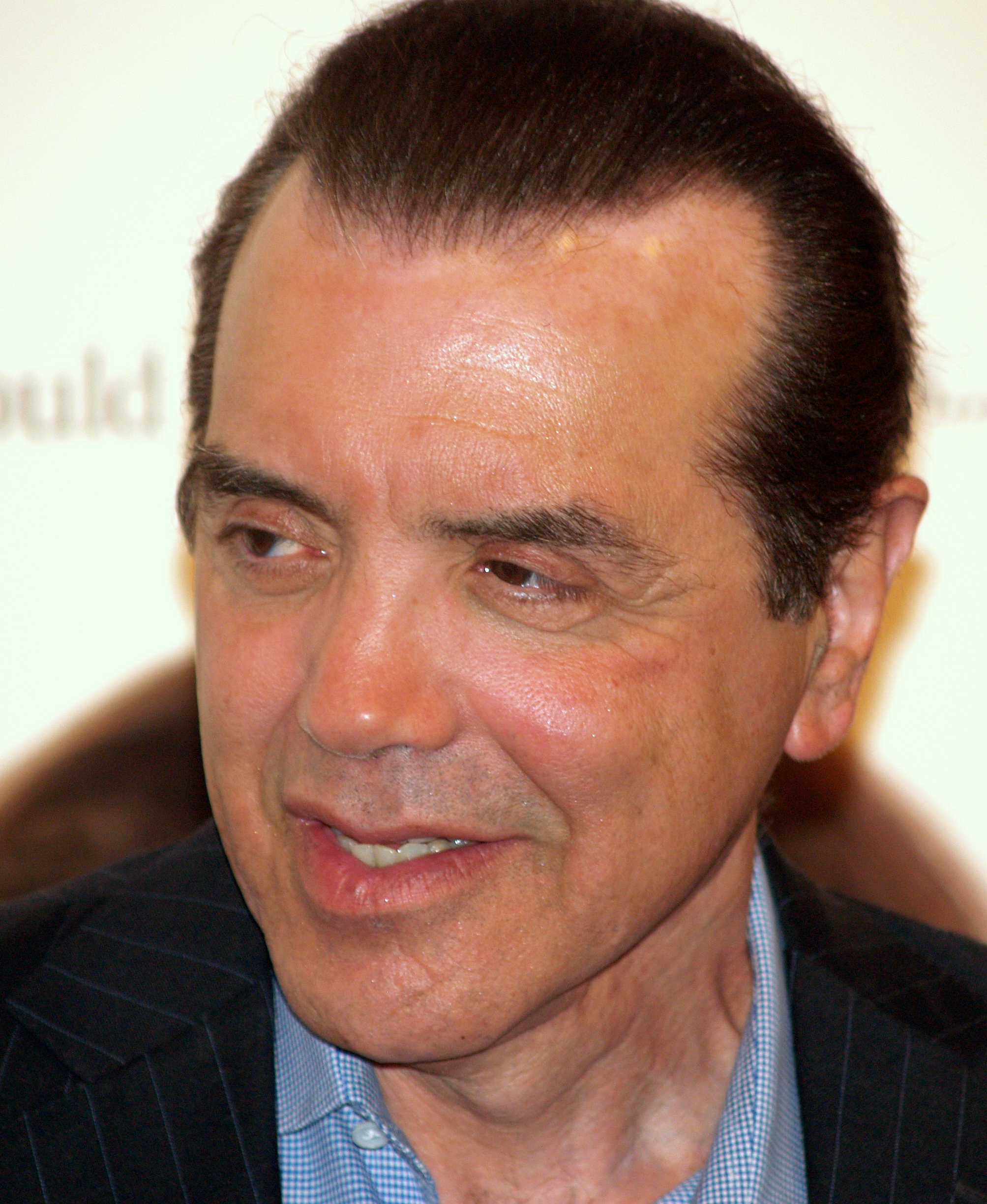
Chazz Palminteri, Best Supporting Male winner

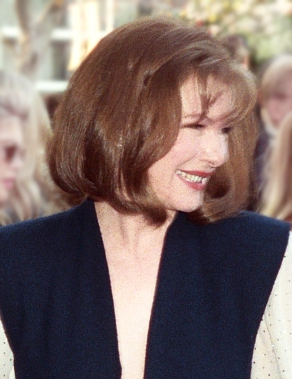
Dianne Wiest, Best Supporting Female winner

Best Feature	Best Director
Pulp Fiction: Bullets Over Broadway; Eat Drink Man Woman; Mrs. Parker and the Vicious Circle; Wes Craven's New Nightmare	Quentin Tarantino – Pulp Fiction: John Dahl – Red Rock West; Ang Lee – Eat Drink Man Woman; Roman Polanski – Death and the Maiden; Alan Rudolph – Mrs. Parker and the Vicious Circle
Best Male Lead	Best Female Lead
Samuel L. Jackson – Pulp Fiction: Sihung Lung – Eat Drink Man Woman; William H. Macy – Oleanna; Campbell Scott – Mrs. Parker and the Vicious Circle; Jon Seda – I Like It Like That	Linda Fiorentino – The Last Seduction: Jennifer Jason Leigh – Mrs. Parker and the Vicious Circle; Karen Sillas – What Happened Was...; Lauren Vélez – I Like It Like That; Chien-lien Wu – Eat Drink Man Woman
Best Supporting Male	Best Supporting Female
Chazz Palminteri – Bullets Over Broadway: Giancarlo Esposito – Fresh; Larry Pine – Vanya on 42nd Street; Eric Stoltz – Pulp Fiction; Nicholas Turturro – Federal Hill	Dianne Wiest – Bullets Over Broadway: V.S. Brodie – Go Fish; Carla Gallo – Spanking the Monkey; Kelly Lynch – The Beans of Egypt, Maine; Brooke Smith – Vanya on 42nd Street
Best Screenplay	Best First Screenplay
Pulp Fiction – Quentin Tarantino and Roger Avary: Bullets Over Broadway – Woody Allen and Douglas McGrath; Eat Drink Man Woman – Hui-Ling Wang, James Schamus and Ang Lee; Mrs. Parker and the Vicious Circle – Alan Rudolph and Randy Sue Coburn; Red Rock West – John Dahl and Rick Dahl	Spanking the Monkey – David O. Russell: Blessing – Paul Zehrer; Clerks – Kevin Smith; Fun – James Bosley; What Happened Was... – Tom Noonan
Best First Feature	Best Debut Performance
Spanking the Monkey: Clean, Shaven; Clerks; I Like It Like That; Suture	Sean Nelson – Fresh: Jeff Anderson – Clerks; Jeremy Davies – Spanking the Monkey; Alicia Witt – Fun; Renée Zellweger – Love and a .45
Best Cinematography	Best Foreign Film
Barcelona – John Thomas: The Beans of Egypt, Maine – Stevan Larner; Eat Drink Man Woman – Jong Lin; I Like It Like That – Alexander Gruzynski; Suture – Greg Gardiner	Red • France/Poland: The Blue Kite • China/Hong Kong; The Boys of St. Vincent • Canada; Ladybird Ladybird • UK; Thirty Two Short Films About Glenn Gould • Canada

=== Films that received multiple nominations ===
Nominations	Film
6	Eat Drink Man Woman
5	Mrs. Parker and the Vicious Circle
5	Pulp Fiction
4	Bullets Over Broadway
4	I Like It Like That
4	Spanking the Monkey
3	Clerks
2	The Beans of Egypt, Maine
2	Fresh
2	Fun
2	Red Rock West
2	Suture
2	Vanya on 42nd Street
2	What Happened Was...

=== Films that won multiple awards ===
Awards	Film
4	Pulp Fiction
2	Bullets Over Broadway
2	Spanking the Monkey

== Special awards ==
=== Special Distinction Award ===
- Hoop Dreams

=== Someone to Watch Award ===
- Lodge Kerrigan – Clean, Shaven

=== Friends of Independence Award ===
- Samuel Goldwyn Jr.
