= HPA Award for Outstanding Color Grading – Television =

Annual award given by the Hollywood Professional Association

The Hollywood Professional Association Award for Outstanding Color Grading for Television is an annual award given by the Hollywood Professional Association (HPA) to post production workers in the film and television industry, in this case color graders. It was first awarded in 2006, and has been presented every year since.

== Winners and nominees ==
=== 2000s ===
| Year | Program | Episode(s) | Nominees | Network |
|---|---|---|---|---|
2006
| 2006 | Outside the Lines | "Arthur Ashe Awards: Afghan Women's Soccer" | Siggy Ferstl | ESPN |
| 2006 | CSI: Crime Scene Investigation | "Gum Drops" | Paul Westerbeck | CBS |
| 2006 | Invasion | "The Cradle" | Tom Overton | ABC |
2007
| 2007 | CSI: Crime Scene Investigation | "Built to Kill, Part 1" | Paul Westerbeck | CBS |
| 2007 | Bury My Heart at Wounded Knee | | Michael D. Ornstein | HBO |
| 2007 | Friday Night Lights | "Pilot" | Rick Dalby | NBC |
2008
| 2008 | Pushing Daisies | "The Fun in Funeral" | Joe Hathaway | ABC |
| 2008 | The Andromeda Strain | "Episode 1" | Mike Sowa | A&E |
2009
| 2009 | Sunday Night Baseball | "Baltimore Orioles vs. New York Yankees (2008)" | Siggy Ferstl | ESPN |
| 2009 | 4 Padri Single | | Sergio Cremasco | |
| 2009 | Mad Men | "The Jet Set" | Tim Vincent | AMC |

=== 2010s ===
| Year | Program | Episode(s) | Nominees | Network |
|---|---|---|---|---|
2010
| 2010 | The Pacific | "Peleliu Landing" | Steve Porter | HBO |
| 2010 | Mad Men | "Souvenir" | Tim Vincent | AMC |
| 2010 | Outside the Lines | "Robben Island: A Greater Goal" | Siggy Ferstl | ESPN |
| 2010 | Temple Grandin | | Kevin O'Connor | HBO |
| 2010 | True Blood | "Bad Blood" | Scott Klein | HBO |
2011
| 2011 | Mad Men | "Blowing Smoke" | Tim Vincent | AMC |
| 2011 | Breaking Bad | "Box Cutter" | Steven Sprung and Peter B. Ellis | AMC |
| 2011 | Downton Abbey | "Episode One" | Aidan Farrell | PBS |
| 2011 | Outside the Lines | "Arthur Ashe Award for Courage" | Siggy Ferstl | ESPN |
| 2011 | Too Big to Fail | | Kevin O'Connor | HBO |
2012
| 2012 | Game of Thrones | "The Prince of Winterfell" | Joe Finley | HBO |
| 2012 | Boardwalk Empire | "21" | Martin Zeichner | HBO |
| 2012 | Castle | "The Blue Butterfly" | Tony Smith | ABC |
| 2012 | Hatfields & McCoys | "Part 2" | Lorraine Grant | History |
| 2012 | Magic City | "Castles Made of Sand" | Tony D'Amore | Starz |
2013
| 2013 | Castle | "Hunt" | Tony Smith | ABC |
| 2013 | Behind the Candelabra | | John Daro | HBO |
| 2013 | CSI: Crime Scene Investigation | "Ghosts of the Past" | Paul Westerbeck | CBS |
| 2013 | Game of Thrones | "Kissed by Fire" | Joe Finley | HBO |
| 2013 | Hell on Wheels | "Slaughterhouse" | Steve Porter | AMC |
2014
| 2014 | Reign | "Pilot" | David Cole | The CW |
| 2014 | The Blacklist | "Berlin Conclusion" | Randall Starnes | NBC |
| 2014 | Castle | "Veritas" | Will Lawrence | ABC |
| 2014 | Game of Thrones | "Mockingbird" | Joe Finley | HBO |
| 2014 | Outlander | "Sassenach" | Steve Porter | Starz |
2015
| 2015 | Boardwalk Empire | "Golden Days for Boys and Girls" | John Crowley | HBO |
| 2015 | Game of Thrones | "Hardhome" | Joe Finley | HBO |
| 2015 | Masters of Sex | "Parliament of Owls" | Matt Lear | Showtime |
| 2015 | Olive Kitteridge | "Incoming Tide" | Pankaj Bajpai | HBO |
| 2015 | Sense8 | "What's Going On?" | Tony Dustin | Netflix |
2016
| 2016 | Gotham | "Rise of the Villains: By Fire" | Paul Westerbeck | Fox |
| 2016 | Fargo | "The Myth of Sisyphus" | Martin Nicholson and Greg Babor | FX |
| 2016 | Outlander | "Faith" | Steve Porter | Starz |
| 2016 | Show Me a Hero | "Part 1" | Sam Daley | HBO |
| 2016 | Vinyl | "E.A.B." | Steven Bodner | HBO |
2017
| 2017 | The Crown | "Smoke and Mirrors" | Asa Shoul | Netflix |
| 2017 | Game of Thrones | "Dragonstone" | Joe Finley | HBO |
| 2017 | Genius | "Einstein: Chapter One " | Pankaj Bajpai | Nat Geo |
| 2017 | The Last Tycoon | "Burying the Boy Genius" | Tim Vincent | Amazon |
| 2017 | The Man in the High Castle | "Detonation" | Roy Vasich | Amazon |
2018
| 2018 | The Crown | "Paterfamilias" | Asa Shoul | Netflix |
| 2018 | The Crossing | "Pilot" | Tony Smith | ABC |
| 2018 | Damnation | "Sam Riley's Body" | Paul Allia | USA |
| 2018 | Game of Thrones | "Beyond the Wall" | Joe Finley | HBO |
| 2018 | The Marvelous Mrs. Maisel | "Pilot" | Steven Bodner | Amazon |
2019
| 2019 | Game of Thrones | "Winterfell" | Joe Finley | HBO |
| 2019 | Gotham | "Legend of the Dark Knight: The Trial of Jim Gordon" | Paul Westerbeck | Fox |
| 2019 | The Handmaid's Tale | "Liars" | Bill Ferwerda | Hulu |
| 2019 | I Am the Night | "Pilot" | Stefan Sonnenfeld | TNT |
| 2019 | The Man in the High Castle | "Jahr Null" | Roy Vasich | Amazon |
| 2019 | The Marvelous Mrs. Maisel | "Vote for Kennedy, Vote for Kennedy" | Steven Bodner | Amazon |

== Programs with multiple awards ==
2 awards

- The Crown (Netflix)
- Game of Thrones (HBO)

== Programs with multiple nominations ==
7 nominations

- Game of Thrones (HBO)

3 nominations

- Castle (ABC)
- CSI: Crime Scene Investigation (CBS)
- Mad Men (AMC)
- Outside the Lines (ESPN)

2 nominations

- Boardwalk Empire (HBO)
- The Crown (Netflix)
- Gotham (Fox)
- The Marveous Mrs. Maisel (Amazon)
- Outlander (Starz)

== See also ==
- List of American television awards
