= The Year of the Fin =

- Magic City episode
- Isaac "Ike" Evans (Jeffrey Dean Morgan), the owner of Miami's most glamorous hotel, the Miramar Playa, prepares to ring in the new year of 1959.
- Episode no.: Season 1 Episode 1
- Directed by: Carl Franklin
- Written by: Mitch Glazer
- Original air date: March 30, 2012

Guest appearances
- Alex Rocco as Arthur Evans; Yul Vazquez as Victor Lazaro; Michael Rispoli as Belvin Jaffee; Leland Orser as Mike Strauss; Bradford Tatum as Al Haas

Episode chronology
← Previous —	Next → "Feeding Frenzy"
- Magic City (season 1)

"The Year of the Fin" is the first episode of the first season of the American period drama television series Magic City. It first aired on March 30, 2012, in the United States on Starz. "The Year of the Fin" was written by creator Mitch Glazer and directed by Carl Franklin. In the episode, Isaac "Ike" Evans (Jeffrey Dean Morgan), the owner of Miami's most glamorous hotel, the Miramar Playa, prepares to ring in the new year of 1959 with a concert performance from Frank Sinatra, but must first deal with unrest from his employees, who want to unionize and threaten to derail his plans.

Glazer had written different versions of Magic City for years. He originally wrote and sold it to CBS, who eventually let it go to the Starz network. "CBS was really nice to me and generous in letting it go to Starz. It’s not a procedural, it’s not a franchise. It needs to be allowed to do the sexuality and violence and the things that were part of Miami Beach in the 1959," he said. Glazer was born and raised in Miami Beach and grew up in hotels, which he bases the series on.

According to the Nielsen Media Research, the episode attained over 2.5 million across multiple telecasts.

== Plot ==
Isaac "Ike" Evans (Jeffrey Dean Morgan), the owner of Miami's most glamorous hotel, the Miramar Playa, prepares to ring in the new year of 1959 with a concert performance from Frank Sinatra, but must first deal with unrest from his employees, who want to unionize and threaten to derail his plans. Evans is forced to make an ill-fated deal with Miami mob boss Ben Diamond to ensure the success of his glitzy establishment. Meanwhile, Ike's son Stevie begins a relationship with Lily, who unknown to him at the time, is the new wife of Diamond.

== Production ==
=== Conception ===
The thing that’s really cool for me about Miami Beach is you have this dichotomy between sunlight and family and happiness and innocence and then at night, darker, stranger mob conspiracy stuff sort of comes out. It seems like a storytelling engine. You can just keep writing about how those two worlds smash into each other.

— Mitch Glazer

Magic City was created by Mitch Glazer, a native of Miami. Glazer wrote the series around his experiences growing up in Miami. He once worked as a cabana boy in a Miami Beach hotel and his father was an electrical engineer at the city's grand hotels in the late 1950s. He grew up listening to stories of the exploits of staff and clientele. Many of the incidents that Glazer relates in the series "are based on stories that happened, that I saw, or older brothers and sisters or my parents told me." As a journalist, he did extensive research on what was happening in the lobbies of hotels in late 1950s and early 1960s. "There’s wiretaps — tapes they’ve made public now — where the CIA gives Sam Giancana and Johnny Roselli $300,000 and poison powder to kill [Fidel] Castro in the Boom Boom Room in the Fontainebleau Hotel," he said. Included in the series, Glazer states, will be Central Intelligence Agency (CIA) activities in Cuba and issues connected to the Civil Rights Movement. He first envisioned "Magic City" as a feature film, but said he quickly realized he had more stories to tell than would fit in a film.

Glazer had written different versions of Magic City for years. He originally wrote and sold it to CBS, who eventually let it go to the Starz network. "CBS was really nice to me and generous in letting it go to Starz. It’s not a procedural, it’s not a franchise. It needs to be allowed to do the sexuality and violence and the things that were part of Miami Beach in the 1959," he said. In 2007, president and C.E.O. of the Starz network, Chris Albrecht was fired from HBO and joined Glazer and some of his friends for a research expedition to Havana. "It was an insane group," Glazer remembered. "Jimmy Caan and Robert Duvall and Benicio Del Toro." They were visiting a Havana hotel designed by the architect Morris Lapidus when Glazer remarked to Albrecht, "You know, I grew up in this kind of hotel. My father worked with Morris Lapidus on the Fontainebleu and Eden Roc as an electrical engineer." In 2009, after Albrecht became president and C.E.O. of Starz, Glazer recalled, "I sent him a script I had written years before, and he called me literally hours later and said, 'This is amazing, let's do this.'"

== Reception ==
=== Ratings ===
The premiere of Magic City averaged over 2.5 million across multiple telecasts. The multi-platform sampling campaign for the first three episodes delivered more than 1.55 million viewers, including 670,000 on-demand viewers. Its official April 6 premiere garnered 295,000 viewers.

=== Reviews ===
The pilot has received mixed to positive reviews from critics. Review aggregator Metacritic, which assigns a rating out of 100 of reviews from mainstream critics, calculated a score of 56 based on 27 reviews. Glenn Garvin of the Miami Herald said of the series "The sordid ugliness that festers inside Magic City's voluptuously beautiful wrappings makes irresistible television." The Contra Costa Times' Chuck Barney praised the cast and visual style. He said in his review "Through the early episodes, nothing really happens that you couldn't see coming. Still, the setting is so seductive, the period details so vivid and the acting so stellar, that it's as intoxicating as a potent mojito."
