= Feeding Frenzy (Magic City) =

- Magic City episode
- Episode no.: Season 1 Episode 2
- Directed by: Ed Bianchi
- Written by: Mitch Glazer
- Original air date: April 13, 2012
- Running time: 50 minutes

Guest appearances
- Claudio Duarte; Jeffrey Dean Morgan as Ike; Olga Kurylenko

Episode chronology
← Previous "The Year of the Fin"	Next → "Castles Made of Sand"
- Magic City (season 1)

"Feeding Frenzy" is the second episode of the first season of the Starz television series Magic City, which originally aired on April 13, 2012. The episode was written by series creator and executive producer Mitch Glazer and directed by Ed Bianchi.

== Plot ==
Ike is forced to deal with the disgruntled father of Mike Strauss, after he suddenly disappears. Meanwhile, the DA uses Danny to help him fight organized crime. Elsewhere, Stevie decides to continue his affair with Lily, despite discovering who she truly is. Meanwhile, Stevie Evans' affair with Lily Diamond heats up. At least Stevie gets more action than poor Danny, who clearly won’t be taking it to the next level with Mercedes until her mother, Maria, makes it out of Cuba and arrives safely in Miami Beach. Given the location and timeframe of the series, it’s no wonder that the Cuba storyline is a thread that runs through the lives of many of the characters, including Ben, who’s frustrated with Castro’s rise to power (“that bearded prick”), and Victor, who, in addition to being Maria’s husband and Mercedes’ dad, is the general manager of the Miramar Playa. Again, though, all we really did was get further reminded that things are crazy in Cuba and Maria’s still stuck in the middle of it all.

== Reception ==
=== Ratings ===
According to Nielsen Media Research, Feeding Frenzy received 370,000 total viewers in its original broadcast at 10PM on Friday, April 13, 2012. The episode was up 25% from the series premiere, which originally aired on April 6. For the night, Feeding Frenzy averaged 556,000 viewers over two airings.
