= Fort São João da Barra =

Fort in Portugal

- Forte de São João da Barra
- Cabanas de Tavira, Portugal
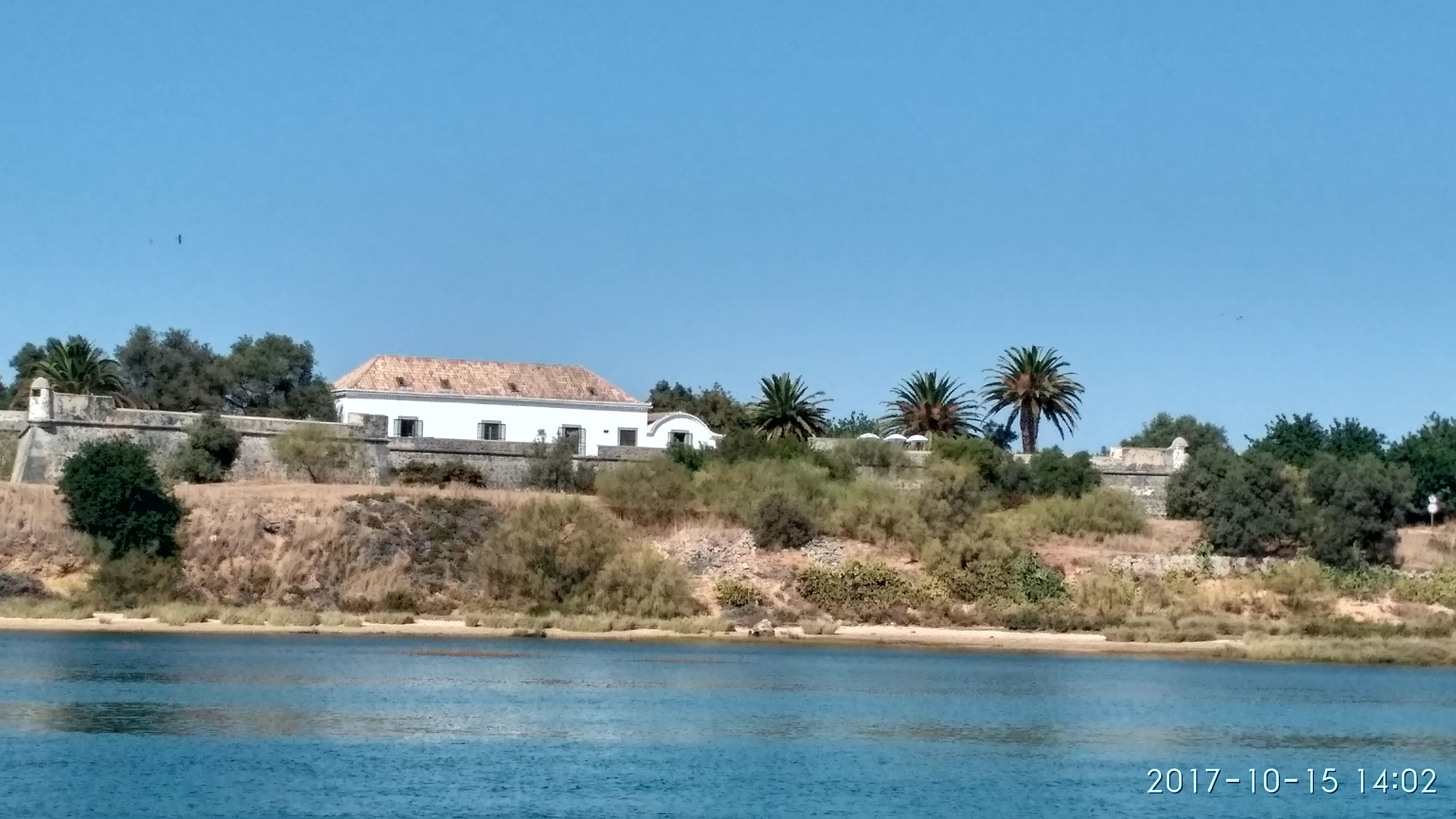
- Fort São João da Barra as seen from the Island of Cabanas de Tavira

Site information
- Type: Bastion fort
- Condition: Good

Location
- Coordinates: 37°08′22″N 07°35′34″W

Site history
- Built: 1670
- In use: 17th-19th century
- Events: Peninsular War

The Fort São João da Barra (Fortaleza de São João da Barra in Portuguese) also known as Fort São João Baptista (Fortaleza de São João Baptista in Portuguese) or Fort Conceição (Forte da Conceição in Portuguese), is located to the east of the town of Cabanas de Tavira, on a small hill below the Ria Formosa in the municipality of Tavira, in Algarve, southern Portugal.

== History ==
The fort was built on lands dubbed Gomeira, where the Raposa Tower, a Moorish keep similar to the Aires Tower and which served as a watchtower for coast guard, is believed to have been, and whose existence is only known via references made by authors in the 16th century.

It dates back to the War for the Restoration of Portuguese Independence, built by the initiative of Nuno de Mendonça, 2nd Count of Vale de Reis, as Governor of the Arms of the Kingdom of the Algarve in 1656. It was expanded in 1670, these works being completed in 1672. The French military engineer Pedro de Santa Colomba was involved in its design, as was the case with other nearby forts. The Italian Giovanni Vanicelli, field master of the armies of Algarve, was also among its architects. Mateus do Couto is also referenced.

Damaged by the 1755 earthquake, it was renovated in 1793, during the reign of Maria I of Portugal.

After Portugal was occupied by French forces in 1808 during the Napoleonic Wars the fort was captured by Captain Sebastião Martins Mestre, with the aid of locals, with the aim of fostering a rebellion that was suspected to erupt in the Algarve against the French yoke, and shortly afterwards broke out in Olhão. Martins Mestre then remained as governor of the fort until 1819, retiring at that date.

After the Portuguese Civil War (1828-1834), it was partially deactivated, keeping a small garrison until 1897.

The first Official School for boys in the parish of Conceição operated in the fort from 1857 to 1865, when work was completed on the building of the current Primary School of Conceição.

It served as a post for the Tax Guard of Cabanas until 1905, when it was sold to a private individual, in exchange for a commitment to build a new building for the said post closest to the village of Cabanas.

It was marked a "Property of Public Insteres" on 15 July 1960. It was renovated in 2007 and 2008 and currently serves as a hotel.

== Features ==
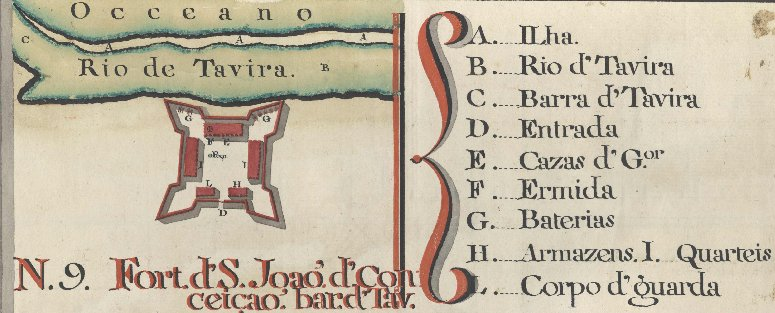
Fort São João da Barra depicted in Mappa da configuração de todas as praças fortalezas e baterias do reyno do Algarve, 1788

It has a square plan, in shaped like a star, with four bastions in each edge, and access ramps to each one. It had the governor's quarters, a chapel dedicated to Saint John the Baptist (the two buildings visible on the south side), garrison quarters, stables and a warehouse, in addition to a well.

== Art ==
The fort was used in the filming of À Flor do Mar (1986), directed by João César Monteiro.

== Stone inscriptions by the entrance ==
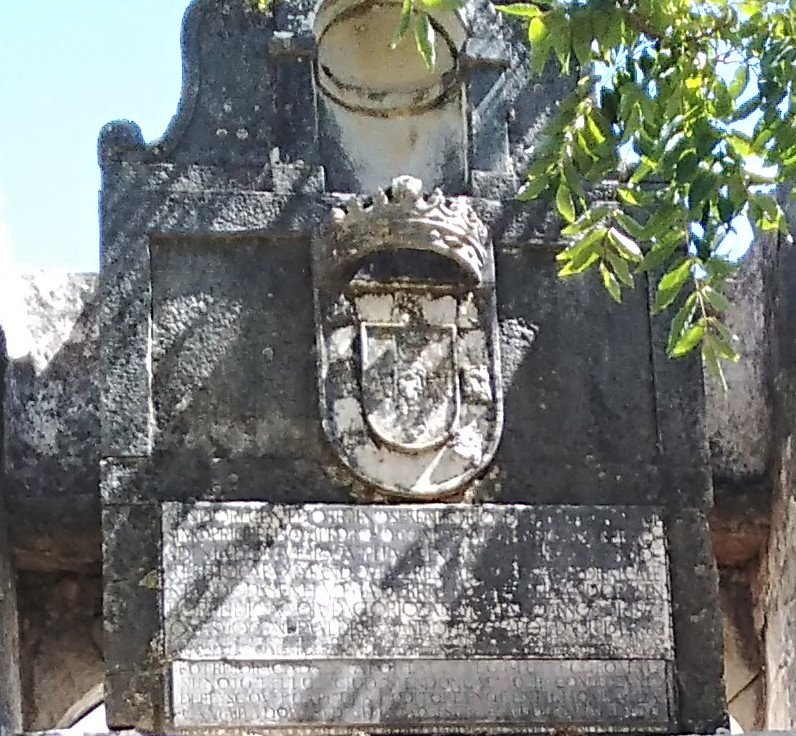
Stone-of-arms with a stone inscription by the entrance to the fort

The entrance has two tombstones, one pertaining to its original construction, completed in 1672, and the second referring to its renovation in 1793. The first inscription reads:

Being regent of the kingdoms and lordships of Portugal the Most Serene Prince Peter, the Count of Vale dos Reis, member of the Councils of State and War and Captain-General of this Kingdom, finding this site able, had this fortress built, out of stone and lime, a fort of earth and timber already constructed, during the reign of King John IV of glorious memory, in the year of 1656, the same Count of Vale dos Reis, had the bridge of the city of Tavira built, and the Governor of this fortress Sergeant-Major Domingos de Carpião Castanheda was charged with the administration of this construction, which he did beginning on December 19, 1670.

and the second:

This fortress was rebuilt by his third grandson Nuno José Fulgêncio de Mendonça e Moura, Count of Vale de Reis, Governor and Captain-General of the same Kingdom, gentleman of the Chamber of the Prince our lord, and deputy of the board of same, during the reign of Dona Maria, its inspector being Doctor Caetano de Andrade Castro in the Year of 1793.

== Governors of the fort ==
The following served as commanders of the fort:

- Domingos de Carpião Castanheda (1656–1673)
- Luís de Correia Mascarenhas (1673–1696)
- Pedro Domingos Palma (1696–1710)
- Francisco de Sampaio (1719–1720)
- Francisco Afonso Mascarenhas (1723)
- Manuel Domingos Cavaco (1734–1746)
- Caetano Pereira de Araújo e Sousa (1794–1798)
- Sebastião Martins Mestre (1808–1820)

== Gallery ==
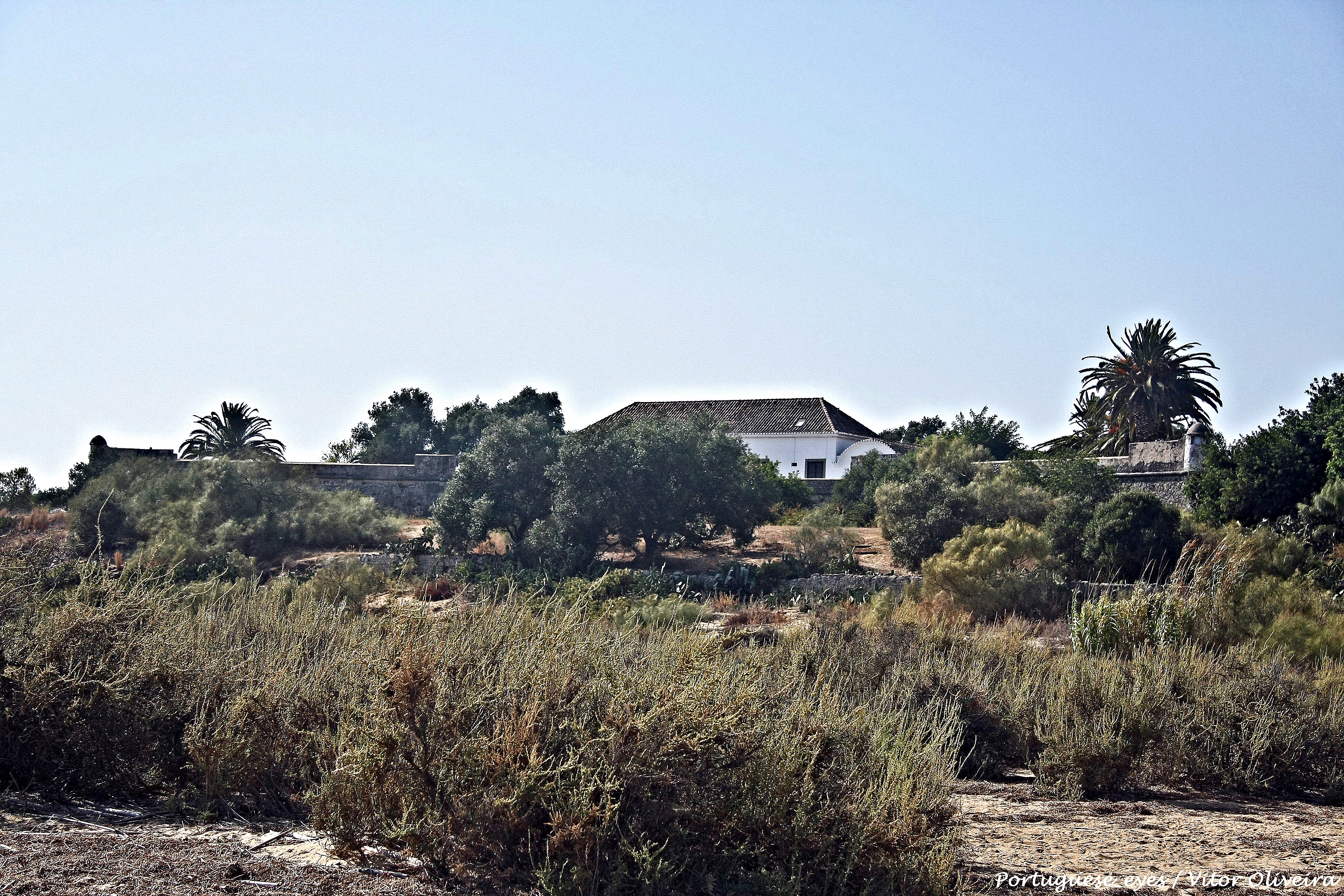
The fort seen from the sea side

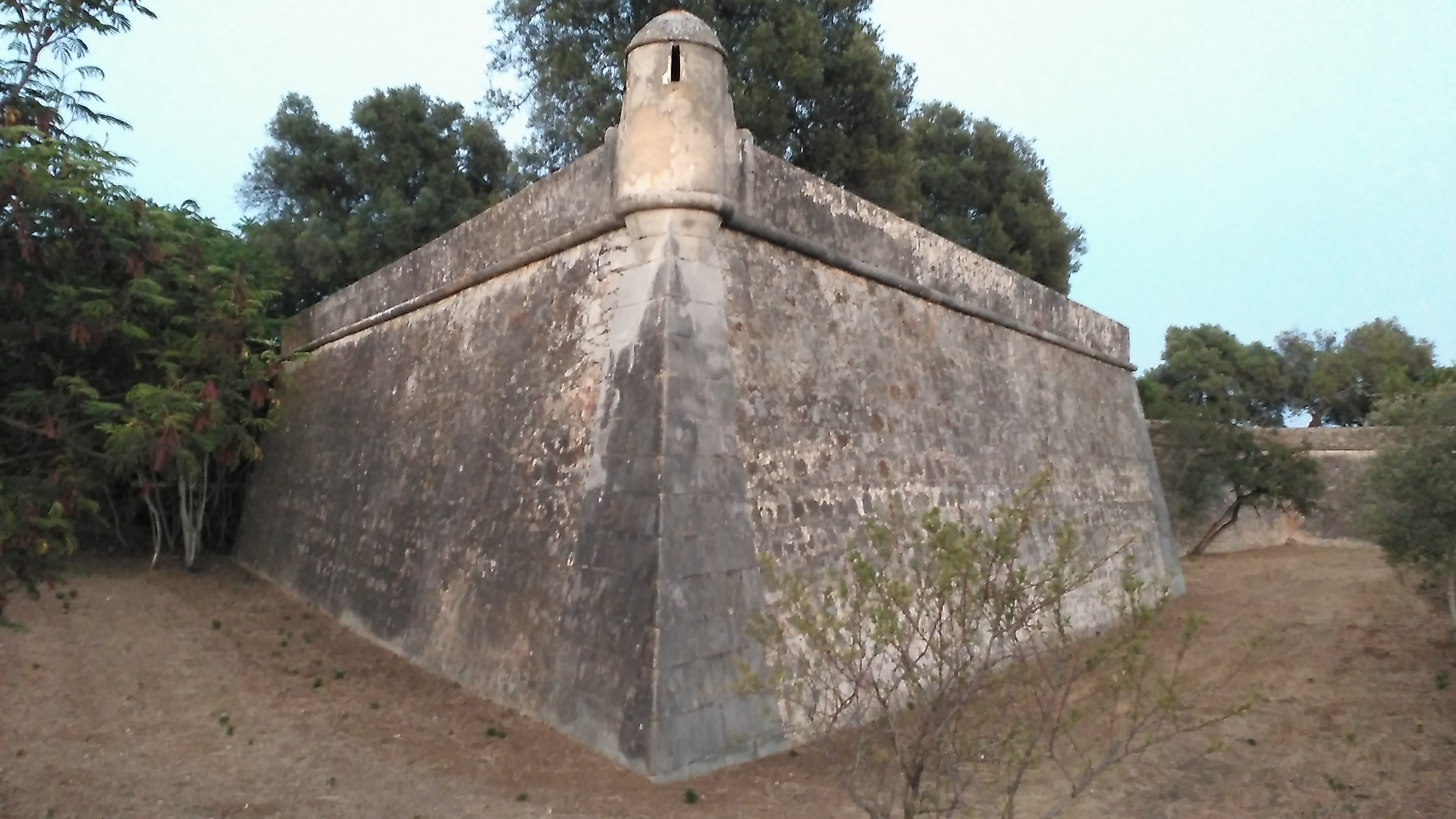
Bastion of the fort

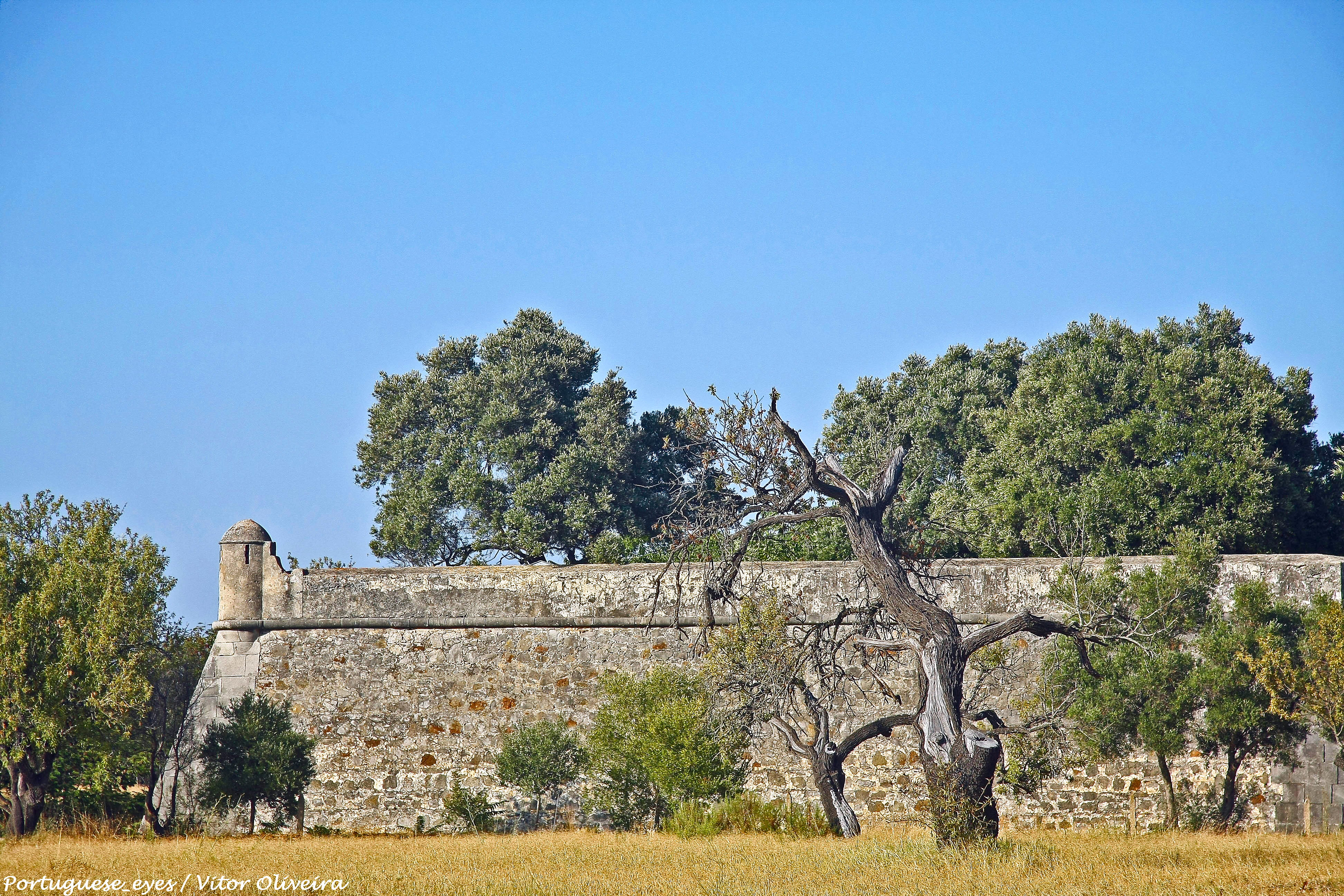
Bastion wall

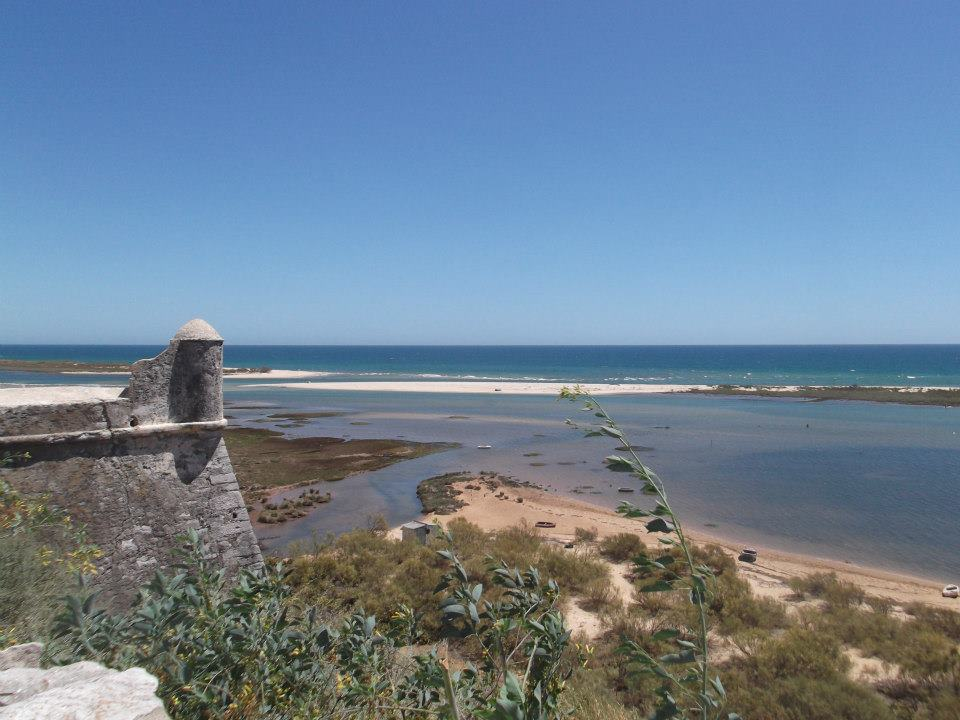
The beach as seen from the fort

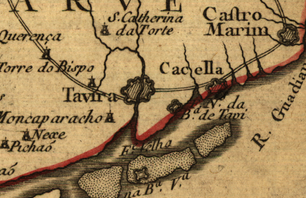
The fort marked in an 18th-century map

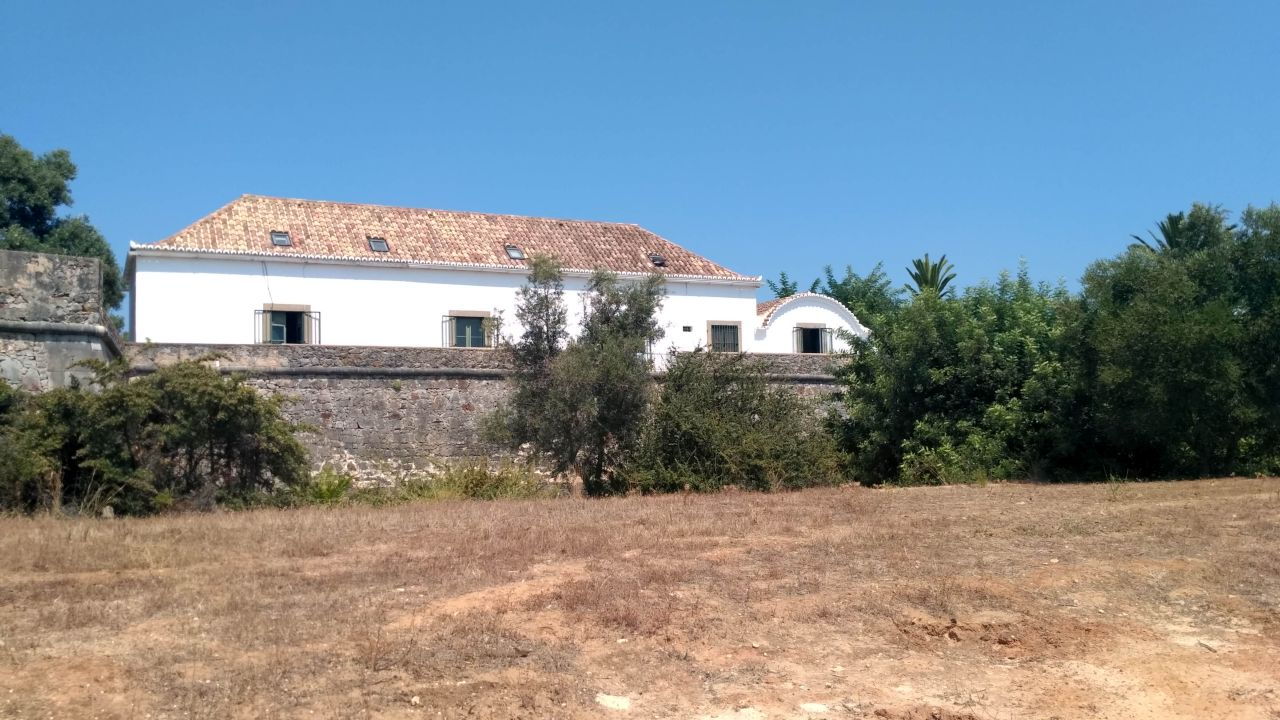
Commander's quarters and chapel, seen from the south side

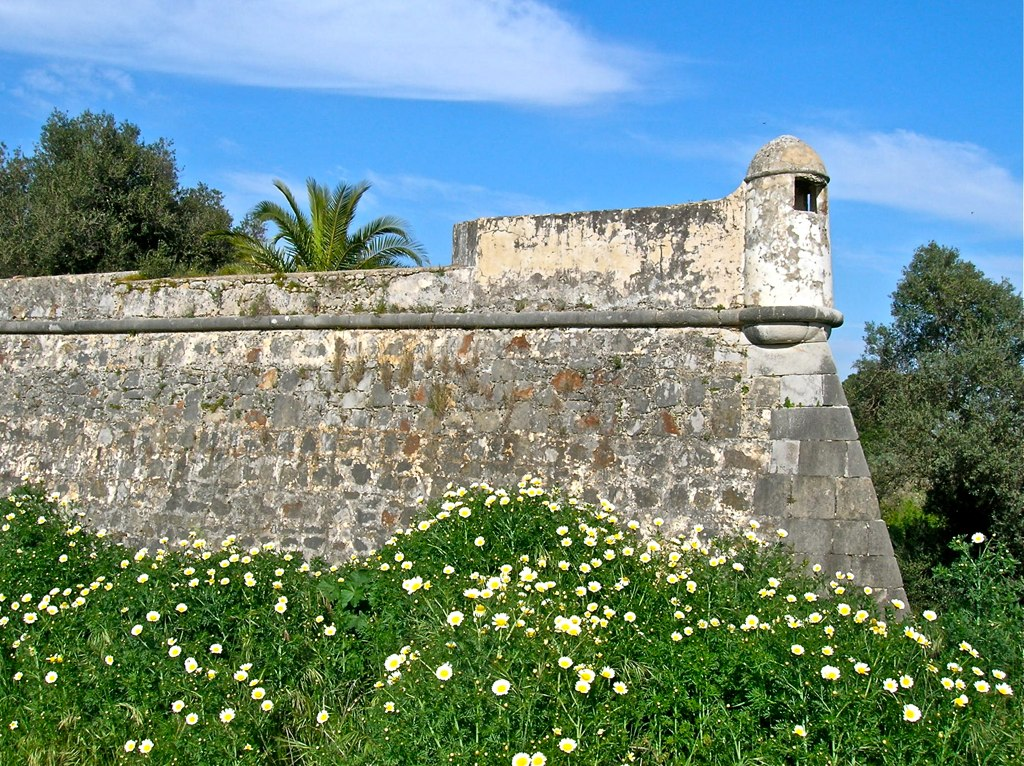
Bastion walls and sentry box

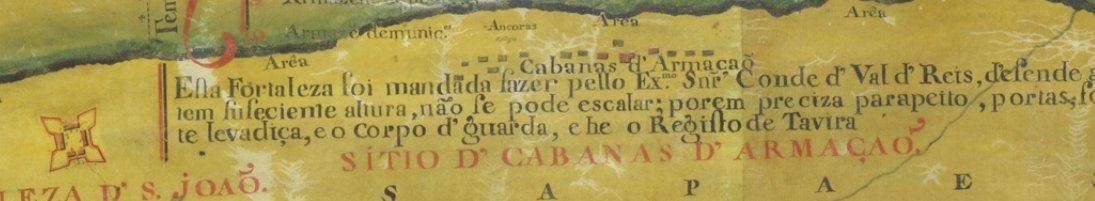
The fort depicted on a 1795 map

== See also ==
- Fort Santo António of Tavira
