= Egyptian bean =

Egyptian bean is a common name for several plants and may refer to:

- Lablab purpureus
- Nelumbo nucifera
- Cajanus cajan

== See also ==
- Egyptian Ful Beans
- The Beans of Egypt, Maine
