= Cabanas de Tavira =

- Civil parish
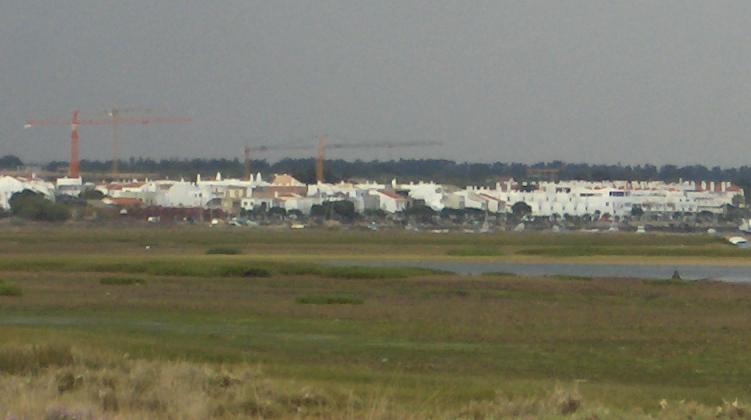
- A distant view of the village of Cabanas de Tavira

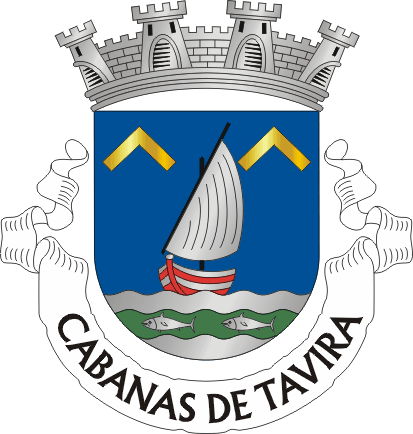
- Coat of arms

- Location in Portugal
- Coordinates: 37°8′36″N 7°35′34″W
- Country: Portugal
- Region: Algarve
- Intermunic. comm.: Algarve
- District: Faro
- Municipality: Tavira
- Established: Settlement: c. 1734; Parish: 20 June 1997; Town: 19 April 2001

Area
  - Total: 4.2 km^{2} (1.6 sq mi)
- Elevation: 19 m (62 ft)

Population (2011)
  - Total: 1,181
  - Density: 280/km^{2} (730/sq mi)
- Time zone: UTC+00:00 (WET)
  - Summer (DST): UTC+01:00 (WEST)
- Postal code: 8800 – 591
- Area code: 281
- Patron: Nossa Senhora do Mar

Cabanas de Tavira (Portuguese pronunciation: [kɐˈβɐnɐʒ ðɨ tɐˈviɾɐ]; 'cottages/huts of Tavira') is a village and a former civil parish in the municipality of Tavira, Portugal. In 2013, the parish merged into the new parish Conceição e Cabanas de Tavira. The parish covered an area of approximately 4.2 square kilometres (1.6 mi^{2}), and encompassed a resident population of approximately 1,181 inhabitants in 2011. Once a fishing port, it is now a popular summer tourist destination, owing to its beach (Praia de Cabanas) and island (Ilha de Cabanas), which belong to the Ria Formosa Nature Park.

== History ==
The history of Cabanas is connected to the commercial tuna fishery. Around 1734, with the establishment of the Armação dos Mares de Tavira, a seasonal tuna fishing operation, the first cabanas (cottages or fishing huts) were built along the coast. These huts were essential for storing fishing gear and supporting the expansion of the fishing company, as well as for providing seasonal accommodation for the fishermen. For over two decades, the area was used primarily for seasonal activity.

Permanent settlement began around 1757, when the first birth occurred and during the following year, the Tavira municipal council granted the first land tenure in what came to be known as Cabanas de Armação. Following this date the first inhabitants began to construct permanent residences in the area.

Cabanas de Tavira became an independent civil parish on 20 June 1997, after being de-annexed from the parish of Conceição. Its administrative center, the village of Cabanas, was officially designated as a town (vila) on 19 April 2001. However, the two parishes would be reunited in 2011, during an administrative reform.

== Geography ==
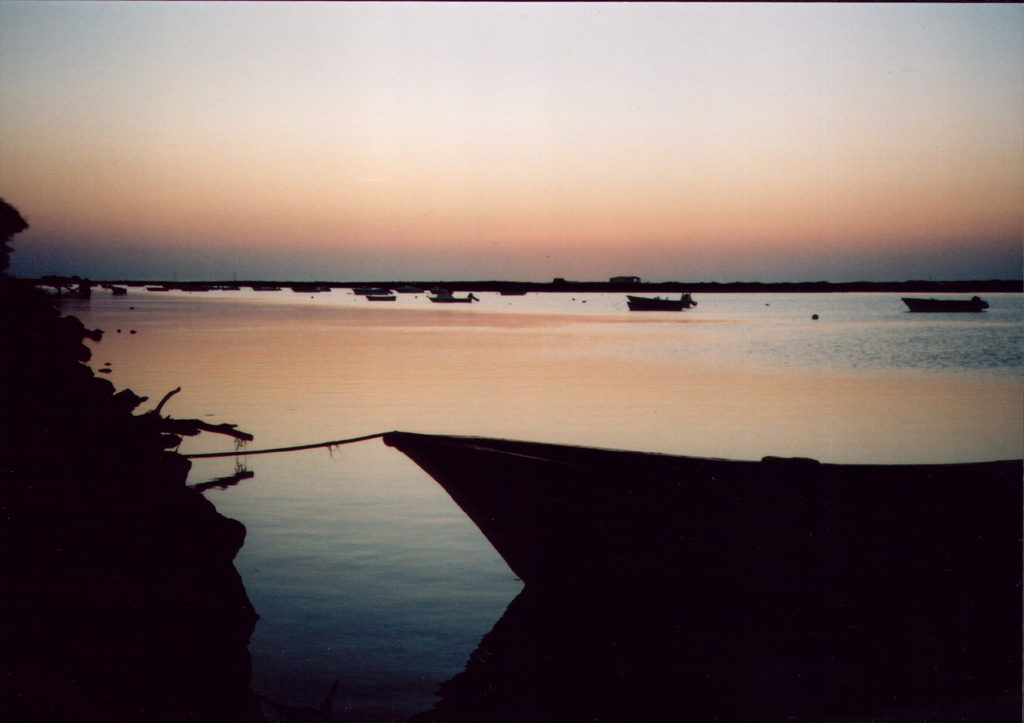
Fishing boats moored along the Ria Formosa at sunrise in Cabanas de Tavira

The parish's northern border follows the western railway until slightly after it crosses the E.N.125 motorway; its eastern frontier follows the Ribeiro do Lacém to the coast; the western border also follows a tributary, the Ribeira do Almargem; while the parish fronts the Atlantic Ocean by way of its island (Ilha das Cabanas).

Cabanas is a long line of low-rise shops, bars and cafés facing the Ria Formosa with several hotel and apartment complexes scattered around the outskirts of the town. In addition to the parish seat, the territory is constituted by several individual places, such as Gorgulho, Canadinha, Canada, Arrancada, Pocinho de Oliveira, Gomeira, Barroquinha, Barroca, Morgadinho, Morgado, Baleeira and Lacém.

Although the population is relatively small, this number expands considerably during the summer period, due to a large influx of tourists and beach-goers.

== Economy ==
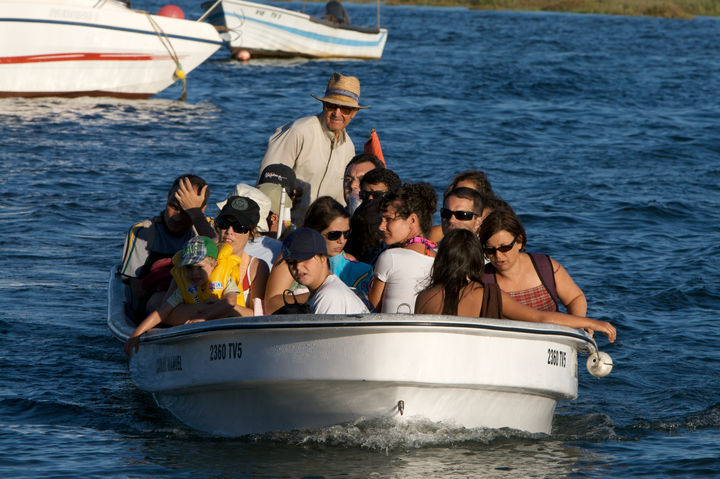
The local water-taxi service to the Ilha de Cabanas, a natural barrier island

Moored fishing boats line the seafront, although the town's economy has drifted mainly towards tourism rather than fishing in recent years. Ever associated with the fishery, in 1973, Cabanas created its first tourist-oriented business. Pedras da Rainha (Queen's Rocks), as it was known, provided the first local employment, and over time, it began to look to tourism as an alternative industry to the primary sector. While the fishery is still a considerable part of the economy, by the end of the 20th century, the tourist sector had become the innovator of development in the small parish. Annually, thousands of visitors come to the region to entertain themselves with rich patrimony, including the Ria Formosa Nature Park and the approximately seven kilometres of beaches, dunes and crystalline waters. Supporting these ventures, the local government has maintained a tourist-orient quality of life, with consecutive Blue Flag designations since 1989, for beach water quality.

=== Transport ===
There is one bus that runs between Cabanas and Tavira, and a bus service that connects Conceição to Vila Real de Santo António and Faro. The nearest rail station is located in neighboring village Conceição and it is a part of the Algarve railway line. It connects the village to other locations in Algarve, such as Tavira, Vila Real de Santo António and Faro, on an hourly basis.

Access to the popular beach is by water taxi from several points along the harbor area in the summer months, but only one water taxi that runs in the winter. The water taxis are small outboard boats operated by local watermen and by at least one company. Each boat may be identified by colored flags on their sterns. You will receive a colored ticket when you board your water taxi. When you return from the beach you need to show your ticket so that the water taxi knows you’re getting in the correct boat.

== Architecture ==
=== Military ===
- Fort São João da Barra (Forte de São João da Barra)

=== Religious ===
- Church of Nossa Senhora do Mar (Igreja da Nossa Senhora do Mar)

== In the arts ==
=== Cinema ===
Some outdoors scenes for movies were recorded here. These were:

- Almadraba Atuneira (1961) (A Almadraba Atuneira)
- Hovering Over the Water (1986)
- Água e Sal (2001)
