= Castles Made of Sand =

Castles Made of Sand may refer to:

- Sand castles, see Sand art and play
- Castles Made of Sand (novel), the novel by Gwyneth Jones
- "Castles Made of Sand" (song) a song from the album Axis: Bold as Love by Jimi Hendrix
- "Castles Made of Sand" (Magic City), an episode of the American TV series Magic City

== See also ==
- "Sandcastles in the Sand," an episode of How I Met Your Mother
