= Sheila Ballantyne =

American novelist and short story writer

- Born: Sheila Caroline Weibert; July 26, 1937; Seattle, Washington, U.S.
- Died: May 2, 2007 (aged 69); Berkeley, California, U.S.
- Education: Mills College
- Spouse: Philip Spielman (m. 1963)
- Writing career
- Notable work: Imaginary Crimes

Sheila Caroline Ballantyne (née Weibert; July 26, 1937 – May 2, 2007) was an American novelist and short story writer. Her work primarily focused on the shifting roles of women during first-wave feminism.

== Biography ==
Ballantyne was born Sheila Caroline Weibert in Seattle, Washington. Ballantyne's mother died of cancer when Ballantyne was ten years old, and she and her sister were raised by her widowed father in Seattle. After graduating high school, she enrolled at Mills College in San Francisco, studying writing.

After college, Ballantyne worked in the medical records department of Mount Zion Hospital in San Francisco. There, she met Philip Spielman, a psychoanalyst whom she subsequently married. The couple had one son, Stefan, and a daughter, Anya. She published her debut novel, Norma Jean and the Termite Queen, in 1975, using her mother's maiden name of Ballantyne as a pen name.

In 1982, Ballantyne published the semi-autobiographical Imaginary Crimes, which documents the upbringing of two young girls in 1960s Portland, Oregon. The novel helped earn Ballantyne a Guggenheim Fellowship the following year, and was adapted into a feature film of the same name in 1994, starring Harvey Keitel, Fairuza Balk, Kelly Lynch, Vincent D'Onofrio, and Elisabeth Moss.

Beginning in 1984, she began teaching writing at Mills College, her alma mater, where she worked for 12 years. In 1988, she published Life on Earth, a collection of short stories which present death as a nameless personified villain.

Ballantyne died at her home in Berkeley, California, on May 2, 2007, of multisystem atrophy, aged 69.

== Bibliography ==
- Norma Jean and the Termite Queen (1975)
- Imaginary Crimes (1982)
- Life on Earth (1988)
