= Castles Made of Sand (Magic City) =

- Magic City episode
- Ike (Jeffrey Dean Morgan) asks his former sister-in-law, Meg Bannock (Kelly Lynch), for a favor.
- Episode no.: Season 1 Episode 3
- Directed by: Ed Bianchi
- Written by: Mitch Glazer
- Original air date: April 20, 2012
- Running time: 50 minutes

Episode chronology
← Previous "Feeding Frenzy"	Next → "Atonement"
- Magic City (season 1)

"Castles Made of Sand" is the third episode of the first season of the Starz television series Magic City, which originally aired on April 20, 2012. The episode was written by series creator and executive producer Mitch Glazer and directed by Ed Bianchi.

== Plot ==
Ike tries to bribe government officials, in hopes of them legalizing gambling for his hotel. Ben begins to worry that his wife is sleeping around. Vera has an unexpected visit of a person from her past. Meanwhile, Ike is forced to ask his wealthy former sister in law for a big favor.

== Reception ==
=== Reviews ===
The A.V. Club's Will Harris gave Castles Made of Sand a B grade, stating "As cable dramas go, Magic City still has a long way to go before it gets anywhere near the front of the pack, but while it’s trying to find its feet and – fingers crossed – actually carve an identity beyond just being the latest in the recent line of ‘60s-set drama, at least it’s worth watching."
