= Three of Hearts (1993 film) =

- Theatrical release poster
- Directed by: Yurek Bogayevicz
- Written by: Adam Greenman; Mitch Glazer
- Produced by: Matthew Irmas; Joel B. Michaels
- Starring: William Baldwin; Kelly Lynch; Sherilyn Fenn; Joe Pantoliano
- Cinematography: Andrzej Sekuła
- Edited by: Dennis M. Hill; Suzanne Hines
- Music by: Joe Jackson
- Production company: New Line Cinema
- Distributed by: New Line Cinema
- Release date: April 30, 1993
- Running time: 102 minutes
- Country: United States
- Language: English
- Budget: $11 million
- Box office: $5,495,507

Three of Hearts is a 1993 American romantic comedy film directed by Yurek Bogayevicz and starring William Baldwin, Kelly Lynch, Sherilyn Fenn and Joe Pantoliano.

== Plot ==
It involves a love triangle: a straight gigolo Joe (William Baldwin), his lesbian best friend Connie (Kelly Lynch), and her former lover, an attractive bisexual woman Ellen (Sherilyn Fenn).

Connie is desperate to win Ellen back and Joe volunteers to break Ellen's heart to convince her that heterosexual relationships are inferior to lesbian ones. The hope is that the disaster will cause her to return to Connie. Neither counts on Joe having feelings for Ellen nor expects her to discover the trick.

== Cast ==
- William Baldwin as Joe Casella
- Kelly Lynch as Connie Czapski
- Sherilyn Fenn as Ellen Armstrong
- Joe Pantoliano as Mickey
- Gail Strickland as Yvonne
- Cec Verrell as Allison
- Claire Callaway as Isabella
- Marek Johnson as Gail
- Monique Mannen as Daphne
- Timothy Stickney as Ralph
- Frank Ray Perilli as Patient
- Tony Amendola as Harvey
- Keith MacKechnie as Frankie
- Ann Ryerson as Jackie
- Gloria Gifford as Operator
- Lin Shaye as Operator
- Jan A. P. Kaczmarek as Priest
- Tawny Kitaen as Woman In Bar

== Release ==
=== Critical response ===
The film received mixed reviews. It currently has a 53% rating on Rotten Tomatoes based on 17 reviews.

=== Box office ===
The movie debuted at No. 7 with $1,928,076 in its first weekend behind such films as Indecent Proposal and Benny & Joon.
