= Magic City (TV series) =

American drama television series

- Genre: Period drama
- Created by: Mitch Glazer
- Starring: Jeffrey Dean Morgan; Olga Kurylenko; Steven Strait; Jessica Marais; Christian Cooke; Elena Satine; Dominik Garcia-Lorido; Taylor Blackwell; Danny Huston
- Composer: Daniele Luppi
- Country of origin: United States
- Original language: English
- No. of seasons: 2
- No. of episodes: 16

Production
- Executive producers: Mitch Glazer; Geyer Kosinski; Lawrence Konner; Ed Bianchi
- Producers: Dwayne Shattuck; Todd London; Tim Christenson; Jennifer Jackson
- Production locations: Miami, Florida
- Cinematography: Gabriel Beristain
- Editor: Christopher Nelson
- Camera setup: Multi-camera
- Running time: 47–56 minutes
- Production companies: Media Talent Group; South Beach Productions

Original release
- Network: Starz
- Release: March 30, 2012 – August 9, 2013

Magic City is an American drama television series created by Mitch Glazer for the Starz network. The pilot episode previewed on Starz March 30, 2012, and premiered April 6, 2012. Starz renewed the series for an eight-episode second season on March 20, 2012, and canceled it August 5, 2013, after two seasons.

Set in 1959 Miami, Florida, shortly after the Cuban Revolution, Magic City tells the story of Ike Evans (Jeffrey Dean Morgan), the owner of Miami's most glamorous hotel, the Miramar Playa. Evans is forced to make an ill-fated deal with Miami Jewish Mob boss Ben Diamond (Danny Huston) to ensure the success of his glitzy establishment.

== Cast and characters ==
=== Main ===
- Jeffrey Dean Morgan as Isaac "Ike" Evans, majority owner and boss of the Miramar Playa, Miami Beach's premier resort hotel
- Olga Kurylenko as Vera Evans, Ike's second wife, stepmother to Stevie, Danny, and Lauren Evans, convert to the Evans' Judaism, and former Havana nightclub dancer under the name "Vera Cruz"
- Steven Strait as Steven "Stevie" Evans, Ike Evans' "bad boy" older son and the manager of the Miramar's Atlantis Lounge
- Jessica Marais as Lily Diamond, Ben Diamond's third (trophy) wife and the secret lover of Stevie Evans
- Christian Cooke as Daniel "Danny" Evans, Ike's straight-arrow younger son and a law school student
- Elena Satine as Judi Silver, a prostitute who works out of the Atlantis Lounge and does occasional jobs for Ike and Stevie
- Dominik Garcia-Lorido as Mercedes Lazaro, a Miramar housekeeper in training to be a Pan Am stewardess and Danny's love interest
- Taylor Blackwell as Lauren Evans, Ike's teenage daughter (main, season 1; recurring, season 2)
- Danny Huston as Benjamin "Ben The Butcher" Diamond, a Jewish-American mobster, a boss in the Miami Jewish Mob, and the silent minority owner of the Miramar
- Kelly Lynch as Megan "Meg" Bannock, the older sister of Ike's late first wife Molly (recurring, season 1; main, season 2)

=== Recurring ===
- Yul Vazquez as Victor Lazaro, the hotel's general manager, Mercedes' father, and a first-generation Cuban immigrant
- Alex Rocco as Arthur Evans, Ike's father
- Leland Orser as Michael "Mike" Strauss, a labor union official
- Michael Rispoli as Belvin "Bel" Jaffe, a gangster and bookie in the Jewish Mob who works for Ben Diamond out of the back room of the Sea Breeze Lingerie shop in the Miramar's shopping arcade
- Bradford Tatum as Albert "Dandy Al" Haas
- Andrew Bowen as David "Divin' Dave" Donahue
- Willa Ford as Janice Michaels
- John Cenatiempo as Vincent Lamb
- Michael Beasley as Grady James
- Karen-Eileen Gordon as Florence
- Taylor Anthony Miller as Raymond "Ray-Ray" Mathis, a doorman at the Miramar
- Karen Garcia as Inez, Arthur Evans' nurse
- Shelby Fenner as Myrnna
- Catalina Rodriguez as Theresa
- Ricky Waugh as Barry "Cuda" Lansman
- Matt Ross as Jack Klein, State Attorney for Dade County
- Todd Allen Durkin as Douglas "Doug" Feehan
- Chad Gall as Ethan Bell
- Garrett Kruithof as Stout
- Gregg Weiner as Phillip "Phil" Weiss
- Jordan Woods-Robinson as Sterling Voss
- Avi Hoffman as Sidney "Sid" Raskin
- Sherilyn Fenn as Madame Renee
- Esai Morales as Carlos 'El Tiburon' Ruiz
- James Caan as Sybert "Sy" Berman, a Chicago-based mob boss

== Episodes ==
=== Season 1 (2012) ===
No. overall	No. in season	Title	Directed by	Written by	Original release date	US viewers (millions)
1	1	"The Year of the Fin"	Carl Franklin	Mitch Glazer	March 30, 2012	0.295
It is December 31, 1958. Isaac "Ike" Evans, the owner of Miami's most glamorous hotel, the Miramar Playa, prepares to ring in the new year of 1959 with a concert performance from Frank Sinatra, but must first deal with unrest from his employees, who want to unionize and threaten to derail his plans. Evans is forced to make an ill-fated deal with Miami mob boss Ben Diamond to ensure the success of his glitzy establishment. Meanwhile, Ike's son Stevie begins a relationship with Lily, who unknown to him at the time, is the new wife of Diamond.
2	2	"Feeding Frenzy"	Ed Bianchi	Mitch Glazer	April 13, 2012	0.370
Ike is forced to deal with the disgruntled father of Mike Strauss, who had suddenly disappeared. Meanwhile, the DA uses Danny to help him fight organized crime. Elsewhere, Stevie decides to continue his affair with Lily, despite discovering who she truly is.
3	3	"Castles Made of Sand"	Ed Bianchi	Mitch Glazer	April 20, 2012	0.375
Ike tries to bribe government officials, in hopes of them legalizing gambling for his hotel. Ben begins to worry that his wife is sleeping around. Vera has an unexpected visitor from her past. Meanwhile, Ike is forced to ask his wealthy former sister-in-law for a big favor.
4	4	"Atonement"	Simon Cellan Jones	Mitch Glazer	April 27, 2012	0.385
While Ike has to deal with a break in at his hotel, Vera begins planning an extravagant charity function that she hopes Jackie Kennedy will attend. Elsewhere, Victor struggles to get his wife out of Cuba.
5	5	"Suicide Blonde"	Simon Cellan Jones	Mitch Glazer	May 4, 2012	0.503
Ike is determined to save Judi Silver from Ben Diamond. Polaroids of Stevie and Lily surface. Vera tries something new to get pregnant, Danny and Mercedes' bond grows, and Klein's search ramps up.
6	6	"The Harder They Fall"	Ed Bianchi	Mitch Glazer and Lawrence Konner	May 11, 2012	0.429
Ike and Ben Diamond bet big on a boxing match. Jackie Kennedy cancels on Vera. Danny gets blackmail photos meant for Stevie, and Klein finds something that will change Ike's life forever.
7	7	"Who's the Horse and Who's the Rider?"	Nick Gomez	Mitch Glazer	May 18, 2012	0.474
Danny confronts Stevie about his affair and uses the DA to uncover blackmail. Klein shows Ike damning evidence, and Meg refuses Ike's offer. Caught lying to Ben, Ike must make a deal.
8	8	"Time and Tide"	Ed Bianchi	Mitch Glazer	June 1, 2012	0.498
Judi Silver falls into Klein's hands, while Victor and Mercedes get bad news. Lily and Stevie's affair gets more dangerous. Juggling family, Ben Diamond, and a new partner, Ike's future is uncertain.

=== Season 2 (2013) ===
No. overall	No. in season	Title	Directed by	Written by	Original release date	US viewers (millions)
9	1	"Crime and Punishment"	Clark Johnson	Mitch Glazer	June 14, 2013	0.496
10	2	"Angels of Death"	Terrence O'Hara	Story by : John Mankiewicz; Teleplay by : John Mankiewicz and Mitch Glazer	June 21, 2013	0.338
11	3	"Adapt or Die"	Ed Bianchi	Eduardo Machado and Mitch Glazer	June 28, 2013	0.448
12	4	"Crossroads"	Ed Bianchi	Mitch Glazer and Ted Mann	July 12, 2013	0.522
13	5	"World in Changes"	Simon Cellan Jones	Mitch Glazer	July 19, 2013	0.338
14	6	"Sitting on Top of the World"	David Petrarca	Mitch Glazer and Rich Cohen	July 26, 2013	0.442
15	7	"... And Your Enemies Closer"	Simon Cellan Jones	Mitch Glazer	August 2, 2013	0.564
16	8	"The Sins of the Father"	David Petrarca	Mitch Glazer	August 9, 2013	0.526

== Production ==
=== Conception ===
The thing that's really cool for me about Miami Beach is you have this dichotomy between sunlight and family and happiness and innocence and then at night, darker, stranger mob conspiracy stuff sort of comes out. It seems like a storytelling engine. You can just keep writing about how those two worlds smash into each other.

— Mitch Glazer

Magic City was created by Miami native Mitch Glazer, who wrote the series around his experiences growing up there: he once worked as a cabana boy in a Miami Beach hotel, his father was an electrical engineer at the city's grand hotels in the late 1950s, and he grew up listening to stories of the exploits of hotel staff and clientele. Many of the incidents Glazer relates in the series "are based on stories that happened, that I saw, or older brothers and sisters or my parents told me." As a journalist, he did extensive research on what was happening in the lobbies of hotels in late 1950s and early 1960s: "There's wiretaps—tapes they've made public now—where the CIA gives Sam Giancana and Johnny Roselli $300,000 and poison powder to kill [Fidel] Castro in the Boom Boom Room in the Fontainebleau Hotel," he said. Included in the series, Glazer states, will be Central Intelligence Agency (CIA) activities in Cuba and issues connected to the Civil Rights Movement. He first envisioned Magic City as a feature film, but said he quickly realized he had more stories to tell than would fit in a film.

Glazer had written different versions of Magic City for years. He originally wrote and sold it to CBS, who eventually let it go to the Starz network. "CBS was really nice to me and generous in letting it go to Starz. It's not a procedural, it's not a franchise. It needs to be allowed to do the sexuality and violence and the things that were part of Miami Beach in the 1959", he said. In 2007, Chris Albrecht (subsequently Starz network's president and C.E.O.) was fired from HBO and joined Glazer and some of his friends for a research expedition to Havana. "It was an insane group," Glazer remembered. "Jimmy Caan and Robert Duvall and Benicio Del Toro." They were visiting a Havana hotel designed by the architect Morris Lapidus when Glazer remarked to Albrecht, "You know, I grew up in this kind of hotel. My father worked with Morris Lapidus on the Fontainebleau Hotel and Eden Roc Hotel as an electrical engineer." In 2009, after Albrecht became president and C.E.O. of Starz, Glazer recalled, "I sent him a script I had written years before, and he called me literally hours later and said, 'This is amazing, let's do this.'"

== Reception ==
=== Critical reception ===
The first season received mixed reviews from critics. Review aggregator Metacritic calculated a score of 56/100 based on 27 reviews. Glenn Garvin of the Miami Herald said of the series: "The sordid ugliness that festers inside Magic City's voluptuously beautiful wrappings makes irresistible television." The Contra Costa Times' Chuck Barney praised the cast and visual style. He said in his review: "Through the early episodes, nothing really happens that you couldn't see coming. Still, the setting is so seductive, the period details so vivid and the acting so stellar, that it's as intoxicating as a potent mojito." Huffington Post criticized the gratuitous nudity ("Hey, boobs!") in many dressing room scenes.

=== Awards and accolades ===
Year	Award	Category	Recipient	Result	Ref.
2013	Golden Globe Award	Best Supporting Actor – Series, Miniseries or Television Film	Danny Huston	Nominated	
2013	Young Artist Award	Best Performance in a TV Series - Supporting Young Actress	Taylor Blackwell	Nominated	

== Movie spin-off ==
In 2014, a feature film directed by Mitch Glazer was announced. Stars Jeffrey Dean Morgan, Olga Kurylenko, Danny Huston, and Kelly Lynch were set to reprise their roles. Bruce Willis and Bill Murray were reported to have starring roles. In 2019, Morgan said "The idea, I think at some point, is to try to make a film." As of October 2023, there have been no further updates, leaving its production as increasingly unlikely.

== Home media ==
The entire Magic City series was released by Starz and Anchor Bay in Blu-ray and DVD formats on May 13, 2014.

== See also ==
- List of films and television shows set in Miami
