= Passion Play (film) =

- Theatrical release poster
- Directed by: Mitch Glazer
- Written by: Mitch Glazer
- Produced by: Daniel Dubiecki; Megan Ellison
- Starring: Mickey Rourke; Megan Fox; Rhys Ifans; Bill Murray; Kelly Lynch
- Cinematography: Christopher Doyle
- Edited by: Billy Weber
- Music by: Dickon Hinchliffe
- Production company: Annapurna Productions
- Distributed by: Image Entertainment
- Release date: September 10, 2010 (Toronto)
- Running time: 91 minutes
- Country: United States
- Language: English
- Budget: $15 million
- Box office: $3,669

Passion Play is a 2011 American drama film written and directed by Mitch Glazer, executive produced by Rebecca Wang and starring Mickey Rourke, Megan Fox, Rhys Ifans and Bill Murray. Filming for the production began in December 2009 and is presented by Rebecca Wang Entertainment. It premiered at the 2010 Toronto International Film Festival.

== Plot ==
Nate (Mickey Rourke), a small-time jazz musician and recovering heroin addict, is clearly a hard-luck case. After a performance one night, he is mugged and bound. He awakens to find himself in a vehicle and being driven out into the desert, but he is helpless to do anything about it. His assailant then walks Nate away from the car and is about to kill him, but instead the assailant is shot dead by a band of Native Americans, and Nate is left unharmed. Nate wanders around in the desert and climbs a mountain, where he looks down upon a carnival and sideshow. He walks through the carnival, and asks the owner to use a telephone, and he wanders among the fire eaters, sword swallowers, and other performers. Nate finds himself drawn to the exotic beauty of Lily (Megan Fox), a freak performer who has wings on her back. Lily is cold and dismissive, but it dawns on her that this gentle giant may well be her ticket to a better life. The sideshow owner (Rhys Ifans) attempts to kill Nate, but Lily rescues him by stealing a truck, and together they flee to the city.

Nate and Lily begin to form a relationship. Nate, fearing another assassination attempt, seeks out Happy Shannon (Bill Murray), a gangster with deep pockets who had ordered Nate killed after Nate had slept with his wife, whom Happy also had murdered. Nate plans to put Lily on display for paying customers, and he offers Happy 75 percent of the proceeds. Happy dismisses the proposal and does not believe Lily has wings, but he later sees for himself, when Nate arranges an appearance of Lily for him, but at a safe distance.

Nate and Lily go to a motel, talk, and then have sex. Happy finds them and then abducts Lily, but to keep Lily compliant, he agrees not to harm Nate so long as Lily lives with him. Nate tries to stay away from Lily, but he realizes he is in love with her. When Nate attempts to see Lily and rescue her from Happy, he fails. By now, the sideshow owner has also learned that Lily is with Happy, and he breaks in and attempts to take her. Happy pulls out a pistol and shoots him to death.

Later, Nate discovers that Happy is showcasing Lily in a theater, and again Nate goes to rescue her. He smashes the glass case in which Lily is being confined, and together they run to the top of the building, chased by Happy's men. Nate tries to convince Lily to fly away, but Lily lacks confidence in her ability to fly. Nate then jumps off the building, and Lily jumps after him, discovering that she can indeed fly. She catches Nate before he hits the ground, and together they fly off into the desert.

Nate looks down on the ground below as they are flying and sees his own corpse at the spot in the desert where the Native Americans had shot his assailant, suggesting that everything that happened from that point forward was actually a dying dream. He is last seen being carried away by Lily into the sky.

== Cast ==
- Mickey Rourke as Nate Poole
- Megan Fox as Lily Luster
- Bill Murray as Happy Shannon
- Kelly Lynch as Harriet
- Rhys Ifans as Sam Adamo
- Robert Wisdom as Malcolm
- Rory Cochrane as Ricky
- Brian Doyle-Murray as Billy Berg
- Jimmy Scott as Himself
- Chuck Liddell as Aldo

== Reception ==
Passion Play received negative reviews from critics. On Rotten Tomatoes, the film has a rating of 3%, based on 33 reviews, with an average rating of 3.2/10. The website's critics consensus reads, "Passion Play has a terrific cast, but don't be fooled – the only real question at the heart of this misbegotten mystery is what its stars were thinking." On Metacritic, the film has a score of 22 out of 100, based on 11 critics, indicating "generally unfavorable reviews".

An incompletely edited cut of the film premiered at the 2010 Toronto International Film Festival.

Festival reviews included Variety describing it as "Perversely eccentric and frequently inert." In a video review, David Poland extended his condolences to Glazer for his 20-year dedication in realizing the project, but described the experience as "an absolute car wreck." eFilmCritic's Erik Childress left the screening after an hour and declared it "Awful." Karina Longworth from Village Voice asserted that "It's hard to imagine that anyone will take Passion Play nearly as seriously as it takes itself."

== Release ==
Despite initial reports that the film was going straight to DVD due to the negative critical reaction at the Toronto International Film Festival, Image Entertainment announced Passion Play would be given a limited theatrical run, starting on May 6, 2011 in New York City and Los Angeles.

Glazer confirmed the new release had a final cut vastly improved by a "generation" from the very rough cut screened in Toronto.

== See also ==
- List of films about angels
