= Imaginary Crimes =

- Theatrical release poster
- Directed by: Anthony Drazan
- Written by: Kristine Johnson; Davia Nelson
- Based on: Imaginary Crimes by Sheila Ballantyne
- Produced by: James G. Robinson
- Starring: Harvey Keitel; Fairuza Balk; Kelly Lynch; Vincent D'Onofrio; Chris Penn; Seymour Cassel
- Cinematography: John J. Campbell
- Edited by: Elizabeth Kling
- Music by: Stephen Endelman
- Production company: Morgan Creek Productions
- Distributed by: Warner Bros.
- Release date: October 14, 1994
- Running time: 107 minutes
- Country: United States
- Language: English
- Box office: $89,611

Imaginary Crimes is a 1994 American period drama film directed by Anthony Drazan, and starring Harvey Keitel, Fairuza Balk, Kelly Lynch, Vincent D'Onofrio, Seymour Cassel, and Elisabeth Moss. An adaptation of Sheila Ballantyne's 1982 semi-autobiographical novel of the same name, it follows a widowed con artist attempting to raise his two daughters in 1962 Portland, Oregon.

== Plot ==
In 1962 Portland, Oregon, widowed, charismatic con artist Ray Weiler is raising his two daughters, teenaged Sonya and young Greta. His wife, Valery, died several years prior after a protracted battle with cancer. Ray spends his time constructing grandiose but unrealistic business ideas, and consistently manages to shuck financial responsibility. Though always developing a new enterprise, Ray was unable to afford his family more than a basement apartment for much of the girls' childhood. After Valery's death, Ray spiraled into a deep depression, and moved the family into a transient hotel in downtown Portland.

With the help of her father's persuasiveness, Sonya is able to enroll for her senior year at the elite Edgemont Academy, a preparatory school her mother also attended. She soon befriends Margaret, one of her classmates, and is taken under the wing of Mr. Webster, an English teacher who praises Sonya's writing abilities. One day, after being pestered by their landlord of their father's unpaid rent, Ray returns home with a large sum of money that he has acquired through a money laundering scheme involving a local mining company; Ray became involved through his fellow con artists, Eddie and Jarvis. Ray pays off his debts, and takes his daughters out for ice cream to celebrate.

Mr. Webster persuades Sonya to take college exams, despite the fact that Sonya cannot realistically afford to attend university. After applying to several colleges, Sonya is accepted by the University of California, Berkeley. Several days later, Jarvis arrives at the family's house with a gun, accusing Ray of having stolen money from him. Shortly after, Bud, the father of one of Sonya's classmates, presses charges against Ray for conning him out of money under the guise of a business investment. Ray is subsequently charged with grand larceny and fraud. After Mr. Webster puts up money for Ray's bail, Ray devises a plan to flee Portland and start a new life in Reno, Nevada, which infuriates Sonya. This sparks an argument which ends in Sonya telling her father she would have been better off without him, after which she and Greta exit the car, and Ray continues on to Reno.

The following morning, police arrive at the Weiler residence with a warrant for Ray. Greta is subsequently taken by child services, as Sonya, though now eighteen, does not have legal guardianship of her. Meanwhile, Ray arrives in Reno with Eddie, where he begins planning new schemes, but is remorseful of leaving his daughters behind. He drives back to Portland from Reno in the middle of the night, and returns to find his house empty. In the morning, Ray visits the home of the judge overseeing his case, and pleads that he protect Sonya and Greta from having to testify.

A day later, Sonya attends her high school graduation from Edgemont Academy. After the ceremony, she apologizes to Mr. Webster for her father's actions, and tells him she plans on working a summer job to repay him. Moments later, Ray and Greta arrive at the graduation, escorted in a police car. Ray gifts Sonya an expensive writing pen as a graduation gift. In a voiceover narration, Sonya recounts the events of the years after, in which she raised Greta while her father served his prison sentence; after his release, he continued to be obsessed with business opportunities, particularly ones involving metals, ore, and space technology of the time. Some years later, Ray went into the mountains on an excursion, and froze to death.

== Cast ==
- Harvey Keitel as Ray Weiler
- Fairuza Balk as Sonya Weiler
- Kelly Lynch as Valery Weiler
- Vincent D'Onofrio as Mr. Webster
- Diane Baker as Abigail Tate
- Chris Penn as Jarvis
- Seymour Cassel as Eddie
- Elisabeth Moss as Greta Weiler
- Annette O'Toole as Ginny Rucklehaus
- Amber Benson as Margaret
- Richard Venture as Judge Klein
- William G. Schilling as Mr. Garrity

== Production ==
Filming took place in Portland, Oregon in the fall of 1993.

== Release ==
Imaginary Crimes was given a limited theatrical release in the United States in October 1994, earning a total of $89,611 at the U.S. box office.

=== Critical response ===
John Griffin of the Montreal Gazette praised the film for its performances, which he characterized as "uniformly amazing." In his review, Griffin also chastised the film's distributor, Warner Bros. Pictures, for giving it a limited release, writing: "The biggest crime associated with Imaginary Crimes is that you'll probably never see it." The Philadelphia Daily News's Gary Thompson noted this in his review, observing that large studios did not know how to properly market familial dramas of this nature, describing it as "unrelentingly downbeat" and "thoughtfully made."

The San Francisco Examiner's Scott Rosenberg gave the film a middling review, noting that, though Keitel's performance is strong, the film "makes no effort to explore Ray's inner life... Imaginary Crimes shows us what a [David] Mamet-style con artist would look like through the eyes of a teenage daughter. It's a surprisingly gentle picture."

=== Home media ===
Warner Home Video released Imaginary Crimes on DVD on December 5, 2000. Mill Creek Entertainment released a Blu-ray double feature disc of the film alongside Silent Fall (1994) in October 2020.
