= Cabana =

Type of hut

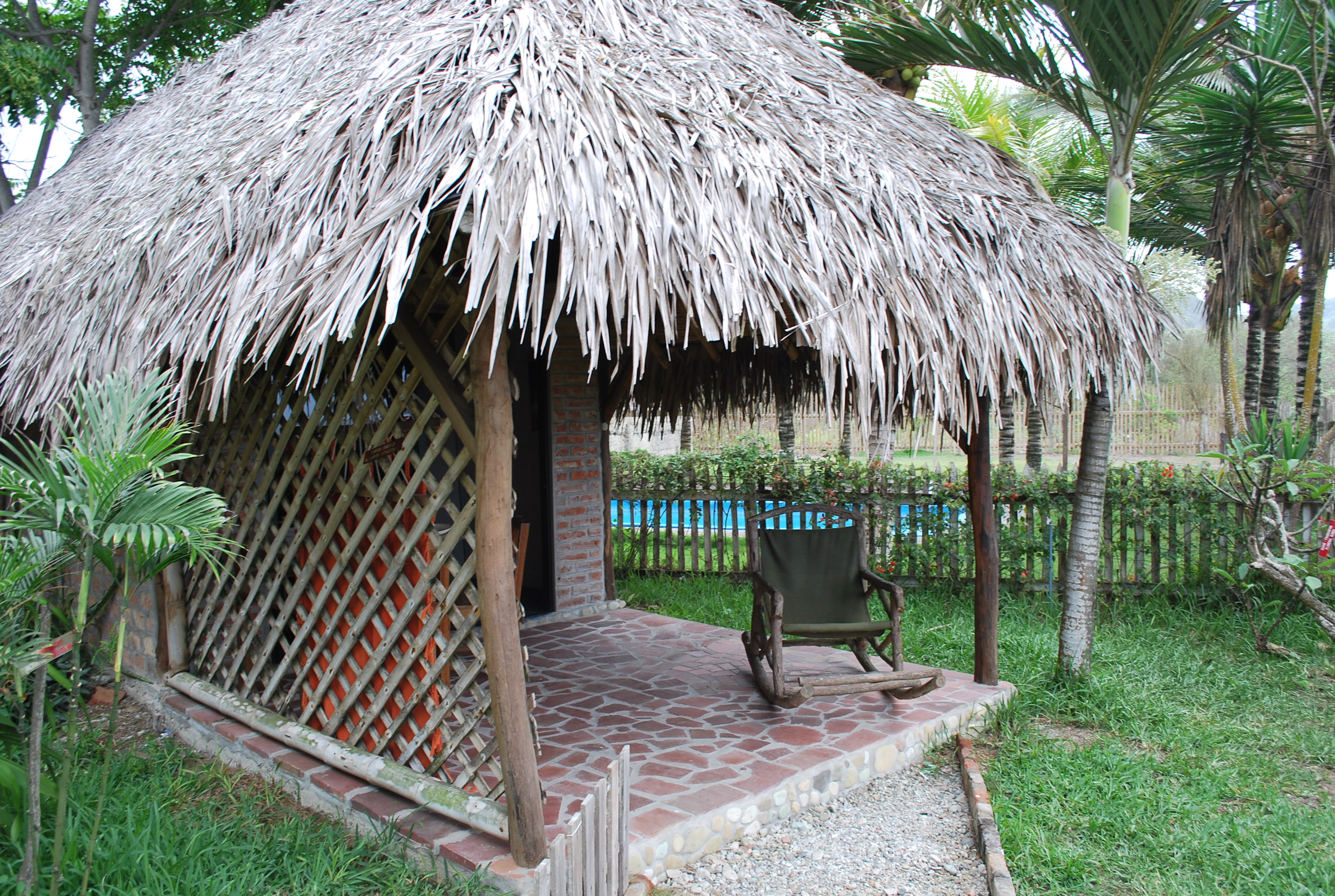
A cabana in Ayampe, Manabí Province, Ecuador.

A cabana is a type of shelter often found near beaches or pools. A cabana can be used to relax in the shade or change clothes.

A cabana bathroom is a bathroom attached to a building or a house that is commonly used by swimmers and beachgoers.

== See also ==
- Cabana boy
- Canopy (architecture)
- Gazebo
- Palapa (structure)
- Vernacular architecture
