= Fort Santo António (Tavira) =

Fort Santo António of Tavira
- Forte de Santo António de Tavira
- Tavira, Portugal
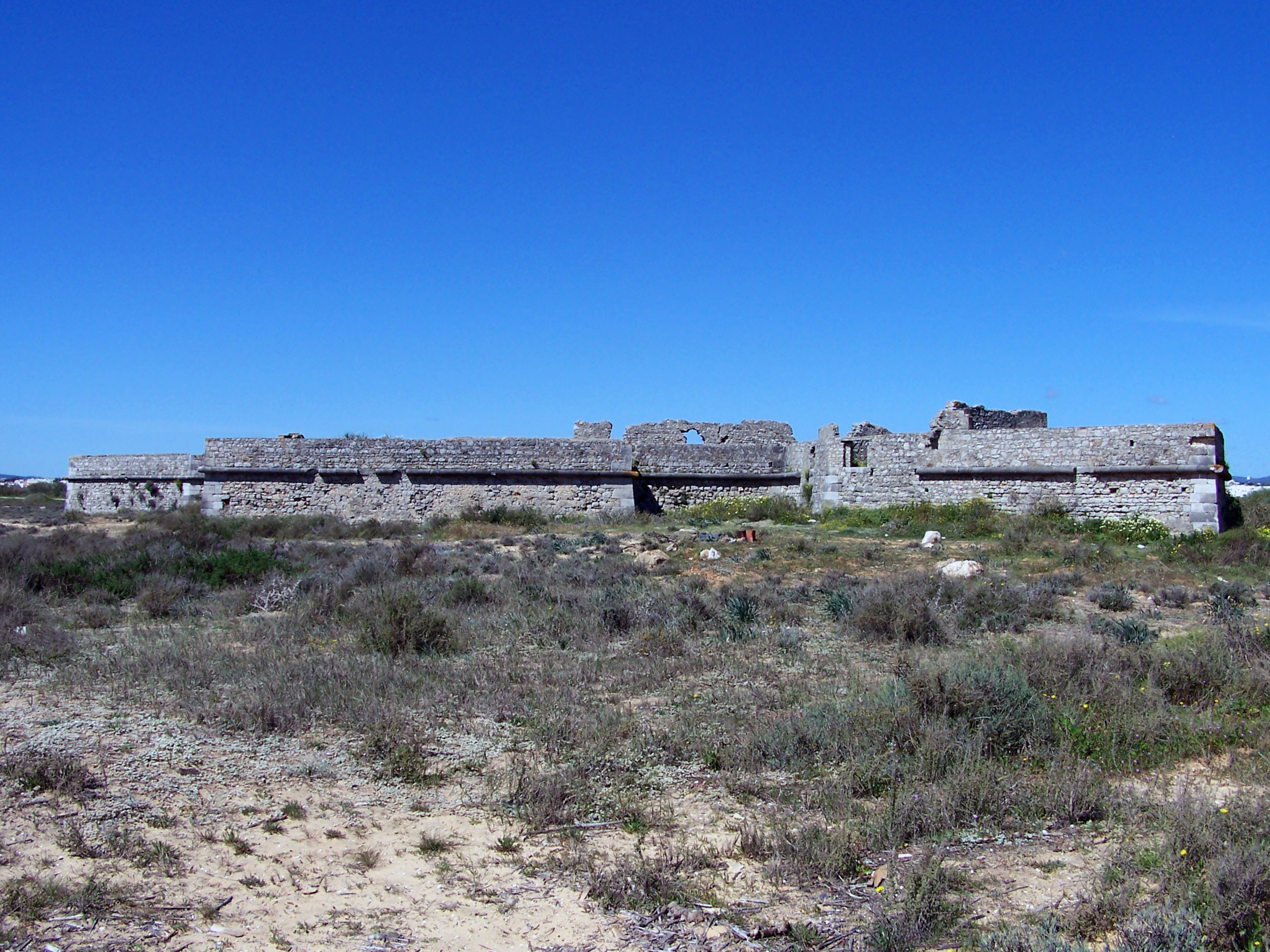
- Fort Santo António

Site information
- Type: Bastion fort
- Condition: Abandoned

Location
- Coordinates: 37°07′17″N 07°37′16″W

Site history
- In use: 16th-19th century.

Fort Santo António of Tavira, also known as Rato Fort (Forte do Rato in Portuguese) or Lebres Island Fort (Forte da Ilha das Lebres in Portuguese), is located east of the Quatro Águas site, at the mouth of the Gilão River, next to the bar of the city of Tavira, in the District of Faro, in Portugal.

It is marked as a Property of Public Interest since 1983.

== History ==
It was ordered built from scratch in the second half of the 16th century, during the reign of King Sebastian (1568-1578) in order to protect the entrance to the river from Muslim pirate attacks and, at the same time, the city of Tavira. It turned out to not be very useful because, during its construction, the rivermouth shifted east, removing some effectiveness to the structure.

It was still under construction when King Sebastian visited that city in 1573. It was renamed under the invocation of Saint Anthony in 1654.

News from 1577 reported that the natural mouth of the river Gilão was located opposite the Fort Santo António.

When Portugal restored its independence from Spain in 1640, its structure was renovated, complementing the Fort São João da Barra, begun in 1672 in the site of Gomeira. When the fort São João da Barra was completed, fort Santo António became of secondary importance, but was maintained to complement the defenses of the city in addition to São João.

In 1792, in a report of the armament existing in this fort, it was pointed out that it was garrisoned by nine men and with two artillery pieces, one without paraphernalia.

In 1821, this building was manned by three men, without artillery, with the door quite decayed and the gunpowder store in a state of abandonment.

The fortress was active until 1840, when, having lost its military function, it was abandoned by order of the Governor of the Algarve Province, Brigadier Francisco de Paula Vieira da Silva Tovar, 1st Viscount of Molelos.

Since the 1980s, there have been restoration works, namely in the Gate-of-Arms and in the walls, besides cleaning and adding signs to the interior.

== Features ==
The fort has a bastioned polygon plan, one flat side turned to land on northwest and another southeast towards the rivermouth, with three bulwarks. It contains troop quarters, magazine and an open well.

== Gallery ==
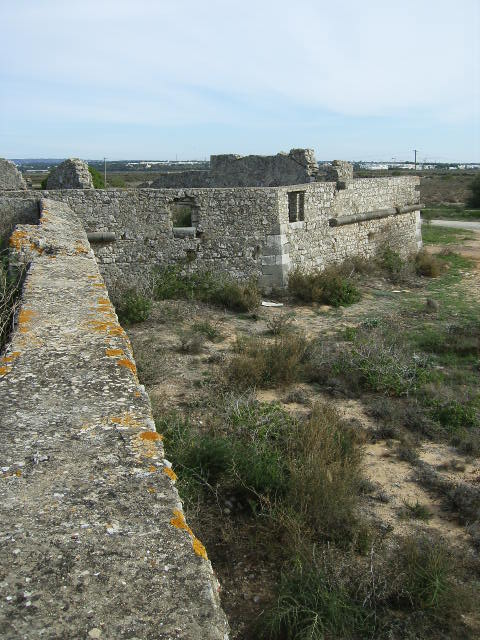

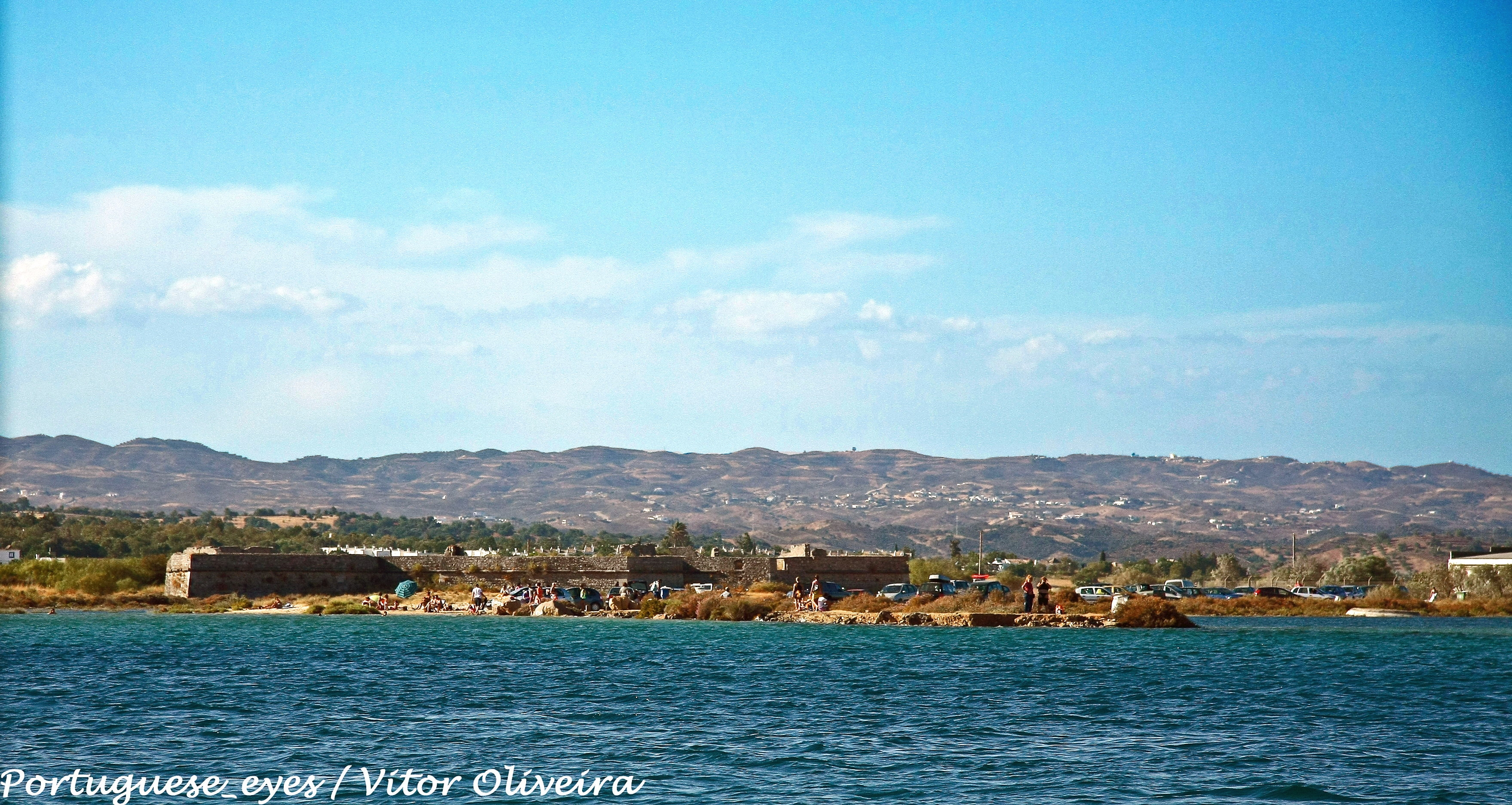

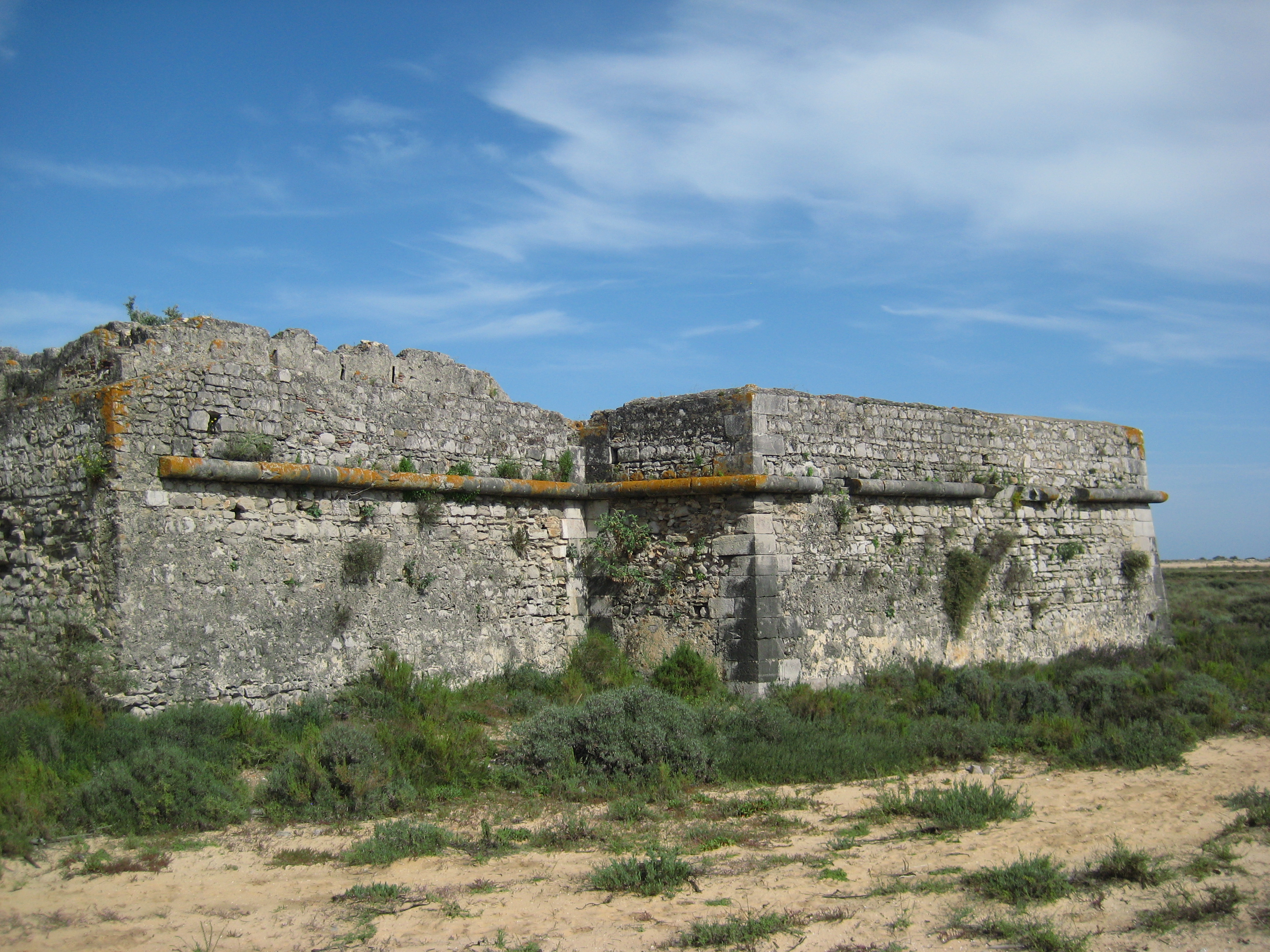
