= The Beans of Egypt, Maine =

- Directed by: Jennifer Warren
- Written by: Bill Phillips
- Story by: Carolyn Chute
- Based on: The Beans of Egypt, Maine by Carolyn Chute
- Produced by: Rosilyn Heller
- Starring: Martha Plimpton; Kelly Lynch; Rutger Hauer; Patrick McGaw
- Cinematography: Stevan Larner
- Edited by: Paul Dixon
- Music by: Peter Manning Robinson
- Distributed by: LIVE Entertainment
- Release date: November 23, 1994
- Running time: 99 minutes
- Country: United States
- Language: English

The Beans of Egypt, Maine (also known as Forbidden Choices) is a 1994 indie drama film directed by Jennifer Warren and starring Martha Plimpton, Kelly Lynch and Rutger Hauer. The film is based on the novel of the same name by Carolyn Chute.

== Plot ==
Set in the rural town of Egypt, Maine, the Bean family is a large, partly inbred, backwater family who are poor, proud, hated by all in the local community, but alive in the sense that they struggle against their lot and support each other in time of trouble. One member of the large family is Reuben Bean, an alcoholic and brawler who frequently runs afoul of the law. He has a wife named Roberta, and nine children. All this is observed by Earlene, a young woman who lives with her widowed father across the street from the Beans' trailer. The view from her window has been better than any daytime television soap opera since she was a little girl; especially that of a shirtless Beal Bean, Reuben's nephew. Earlene's highly religious father warns her against any contact with the Bean family, but despite the Beans' crude ways, the young woman is drawn to them. Their earthiness, directness, and unity stand in sharp contrast to her oppressive family life.

When Reuben is sent to prison for resisting arrest for out-of-season deer hunting, Beal takes up with Reuben's wife Roberta. Beal also has a short tryst with Earlene, who becomes pregnant after a one-time sexual encounter with him, which results in her being disowned by her father and leads her to marry Beal and move in with him at his trailer. After Earlene gives birth to a daughter, and later to another baby boy, her marriage with Beal begins to fall apart due to Beal's continuing infatuation with Roberta, further complicated by extreme poverty and Beal's pride at his refusal to accept welfare or any handouts.

Beal's short temper and his abusive nature soon gets the best of him as he begins drinking and beating Earlene when things get worse for them. After getting into another drunken brawl with some locals, the police are called to Beal's trailer when after he threatens them with his hunting rifle, the police shoot him dead in self defense. With Earlene now alone to raise her five-year-old daughter and one-year-old son all by herself, she finds some hope in the final scene when Reuben arrives after being released from prison. After Reuben learns about his nephew's death, he has a heart-to-heart talk with Earlene and agrees to help support her and Beal's two children the best that he can.

== Cast ==
- Martha Plimpton as Earlene Pomerleau
  - Rae Adams as young Earlene Pomerleau
- Kelly Lynch as Roberta Bean
- Rutger Hauer as Reuben Bean
- Patrick McGaw as Beal Bean
  - Lance Robinson as young Beal Bean
- Richard Sanders as Lee Pomerleau
- Ariana Lamon-Anderson as Bonnie Loo
- Michael MacRae as Cole Deveraux
- Susanna Burney as Merry Merry
- James Gervasi as Pa Bean
- Jennifer Warren as Cop
