= Cabana boy =

Type of male attendant

A cabana boy is a male attendant who serves the guests of a hotel, large private estate, or luxury resort operating from a nearby cabaña (Spanish for cabin; compare cabin boy, a similar occupation aboard ships during the Age of Sail), often on a beach. A pool boy or pool attendant performs the same duties at a swimming pool. Duties may include: working with towels, swimsuits, robes, blankets, bathing caps, soap, umbrellas, beach chairs, launder, and may serve refreshments.

== Notable cabana boys in fiction ==
=== Literature ===
- in the 1974 novel Montauk by the Swiss writer Max Frisch

=== Motion pictures ===
- Jeffrey Willis in The Flamingo Kid
- Enrique Salvatore in Legally Blonde
- Alan Riply in Forever Mine

=== Video games ===
- in The Curse of Monkey Island and The Siege of Plunder
- a single mission in Hitman: Blood Money, set in Del Mar, California

=== Television ===
- Brad Carlton in The Young and the Restless
- Cabana Boy (also known as Pool Boy) in MADtv's recurring skit "Cabana Chat" played by Bryan Callen
- John Cherland and Kirk Porter in Crowned: The Mother of All Pageants
- Sean (Dustin Clare) in Satisfaction
- Chandler Bing (Matthew Perry) in Friends
- Ramon (Carlos Jacott) in Seinfeld
- Zak (Paul Michael Robinson) in Sabrina, the Teenage Witch
- Brandon Walsh (Jason Priestley) in Beverly Hills, 90210
- Bart Simpson in The Simpsons was once described by his sister Lisa Simpson as "the devil's cabana boy."
- In Monk (TV series) Lieutenant Randy Disher is mockingly dubbed a "Cabana Boy" of his superior, Captain Leland Stottlemeyer, by the criminal Dale the Whale.

== See also ==
- Butler
- Page (servant)
- Groom (profession)
- Valet
