= Mitch Glazer =

American writer, producer, and actor

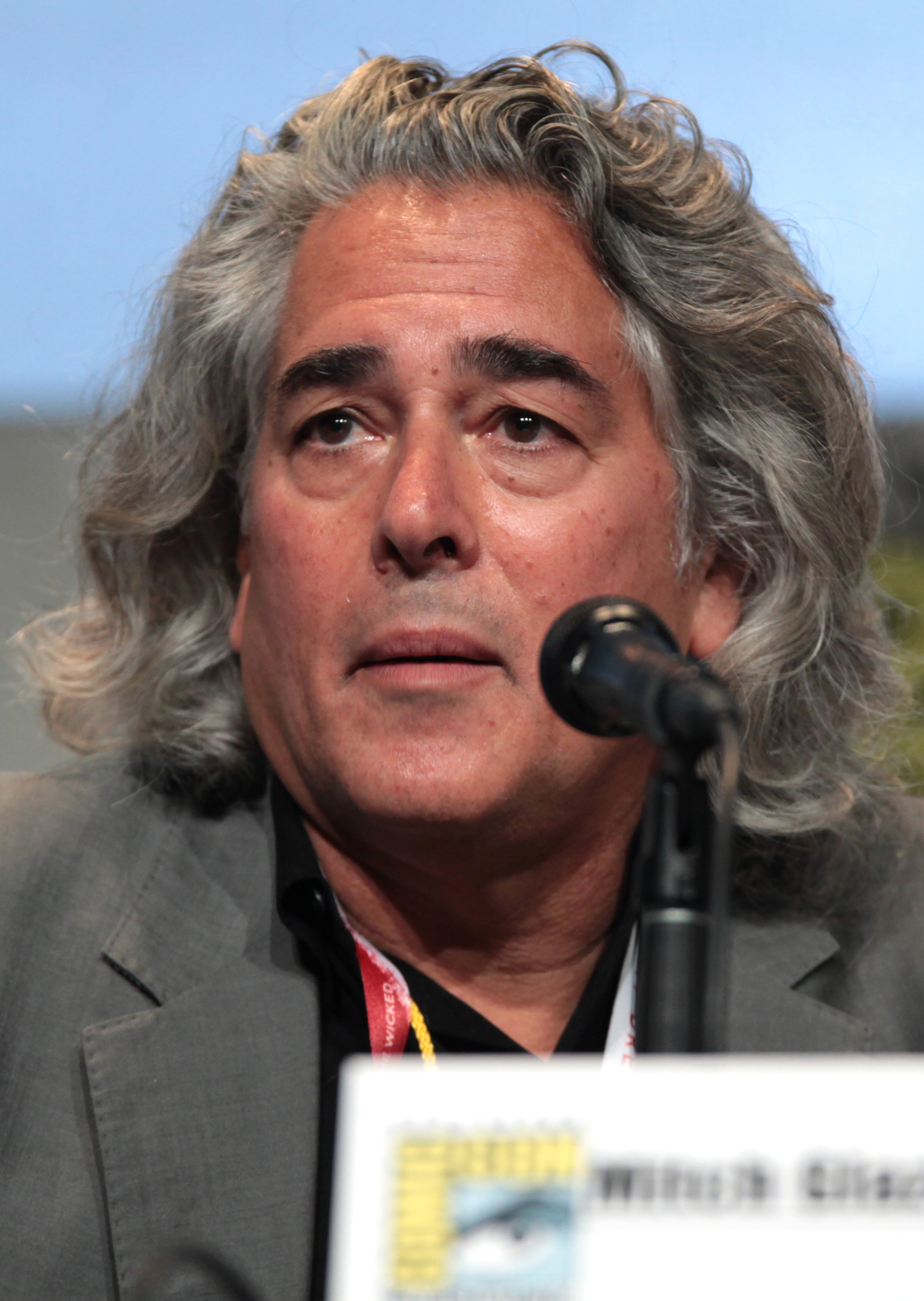
- Glazer in 2015
- Born: 1952 or 1953 (age 72–73); Key Biscayne, Florida, U.S.
- Education: Miami Beach High School; New York University
- Occupations: Producer, writer, actor
- Spouses: Wendie Malick (m. 1982; div. 1989) Kelly Lynch (m. 1992)

Mitchell Aram Glazer (born 1952/1953) is an American writer, producer, and actor.

== Early life ==
Glazer was born in Key Biscayne, Florida, and was raised in Miami, the son of Leonard and Zelda Glazer, an English teacher. Glazer is a close relative of Sidney Glazier and musician Tom Glazer. He attended Miami Beach High School and graduated from there early in 1970. He attended Clark University before transferring to NYU. Before becoming a screenwriter, he wrote for the music publications Rolling Stone magazine and Crawdaddy!, where he met and befriended Timothy White. He is Jewish.

== Career ==
Glazer was a reporter for Crawdaddy! magazine in the late 1970s. He collaborated with friend and writing partner Michael O'Donoghue on several projects, most notably the holiday comedy Scrooged that starred Bill Murray. He was also good friends with John Belushi, and wrote the novelization for The Blues Brothers under the pen name "Miami Mitch."

Glazer was formerly married to actress Wendie Malick but divorced her in 1989 after seven years. In 1992 he married actress Kelly Lynch and legally adopted her daughter Shane. Glazer and Lynch own two modern architectural homes in California: one by John Lautner in the Hollywood Hills and the other by Richard Neutra in Lone Pine, California. In 2007, Glazer and Lynch were named as one of Vanity Fair's best-dressed couples.

Glazer is friends with actors Bill Murray and Mickey Rourke, who was two years ahead of him at Miami Beach High School.

In a 2024 interview on the New Heights Podcast with Jason and Travis Kelce, Bill Murray confirmed that he would prank call Glazer anytime he was watching the sex scene between Glazer's wife, Kelly Lynch, and Patrick Swayze in the film Road House.

== Filmography ==
Writer

Year	Title	Director
1979	Mr. Mike's Mondo Video	Michael O'Donoghue
1988	Scrooged	Richard Donner
1991	Off and Running	Ed Bianchi
1993	Three of Hearts	Yurek Bogayevicz
1998	Great Expectations	Alfonso Cuarón
2003	The Recruit	Roger Donaldson
2010	Passion Play	Himself
2015	Rock the Kasbah	Barry Levinson

Acting roles

Year	Title	Role
1979	Mr. Mike's Mondo Video	Man selling film to Mr. Mike
1988	Scrooged	Guest

Producer

- Lost in Translation (2003) (Associate producer)
- Drifting Elegant (2006)

Television

Year	Title	Writer	Producer	Creator	Notes
1981	Saturday Night Live	Yes	No	No	Episode "Jr. Walker & the All-Stars"
1990	Totally Hidden Video	No	Yes	No	Segment only
2012–13	Magic City	Yes	Yes	Yes	
2015	A Very Murray Christmas	Yes	No	No	Television film
