= Kelly Lynch =

American actress (born 1959)

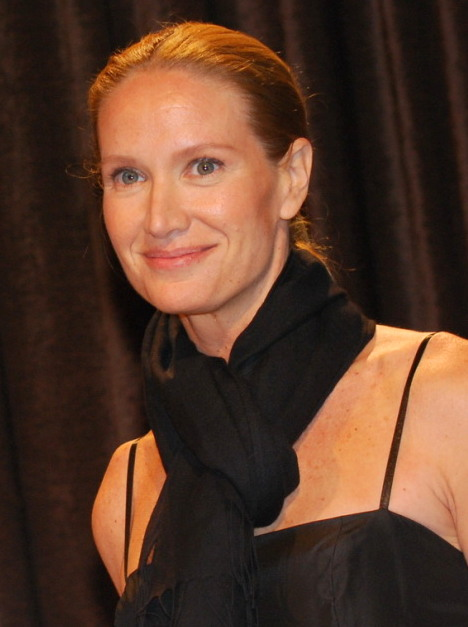
- Lynch in 2007
- Born: January 31, 1959 (age 67); Golden Valley, Minnesota, U.S.
- Occupation: Actress
- Years active: 1983–present
- Spouse: Mitch Glazer (m. 1992)
- Children: 1

Kelly Lynch (born January 31, 1959) is an American film and television actress. She gained recognition for her roles in Cocktail and Road House (1989). She was subsequently nominated for the Independent Spirit Award for Best Female Lead for her performance in Drugstore Cowboy (1989), and for Best Supporting Female for The Beans of Egypt, Maine (1994).

On television, Lynch played Ivan Aycock on The L Word (2004–09), Meg Banncock on Magic City (2012–13), and Deborah Hartsfield on Mr. Mercedes (2017).

== Early life ==
Lynch was born in Golden Valley, Minnesota, the daughter of Barbara and Robert Lynch. She attended the Guthrie Theater. She worked as a flight attendant after leaving college and worked as a model for the Elite modeling agency before acting.

In 1980, when Lynch was 20 years old, she suffered a head-on collision car accident involving another motorist driving the wrong direction on a Minnesota freeway. Lynch sustained significant injuries in the accident: Her upper body went through her car's windshield, and the steering wheel and dashboard crushed both of her legs, breaking each. Lynch spent approximately a year hospitalized and nearly had to have both of her legs amputated.

== Career ==
After several small roles, Lynch was cast in her breakthrough role in the feature film Cocktail (1988). In 1989, Lynch starred opposite Patrick Swayze in the action film Road House, and was nominated for the Independent Spirit Award for Best Female Lead for her performance in the crime drama Drugstore Cowboy, directed by Gus Van Sant. She was also nominated for an Independent Spirit Award for The Beans of Egypt, Maine (1994). She turned down the role of Catherine Tramell in Basic Instinct (1992).

Lynch later had leading roles in a number of independent movies and co-starred in several Hollywood feature films, including Desperate Hours (1990), Curly Sue (1991), Three of Hearts (1993), Imaginary Crimes (1994), Virtuosity (1995), Heaven's Prisoners (1996), Mr. Magoo (1997), and Homegrown (1998). In the 2000s, Lynch had supporting roles in the films Charlie's Angels (2000), Joe Somebody (2001), and The Jacket (2005).

On television, Lynch had the recurring role of Ivan Aycock from 2004 to 2009 in the Showtime drama series The L Word. She later joined the cast of The CW teen soap 90210 (2010–2011) as Laurel Cooper. She returned to cable television with the recurring role of Meg Bannock in Magic City (2012–2013), created by her husband, Mitch Glazer.

== Personal life ==
Lynch has been married to producer and writer Mitch Glazer since 1992 and has a daughter, Shane, born in 1985, from a previous relationship.

Lynch and her husband have owned the Oyler House, architect Richard Neutra's desert retreat, since 2014.

== Filmography ==
=== Film ===
| Year | Title | Role | Notes |
|---|---|---|---|
| 1983 | Portfolio | Elite Model | |
| 1985 | Osa | Osa | |
| 1988 | Bright Lights, Big City | Elaine | |
| 1988 | Cocktail | Kerry Coughlin | |
| 1989 | Warm Summer Rain | Kate | |
| 1989 | Road House | Dr. Elizabeth "Doc" Clay | |
| 1989 | Drugstore Cowboy | Dianne | Nominated—Independent Spirit Award for Best Female Lead |
| 1990 | Desperate Hours | Nancy Breyers | |
| 1991 | Curly Sue | Grey Ellison | |
| 1993 | Three of Hearts | Connie Czapski | |
| 1994 | Imaginary Crimes | Valery Weiler | |
| 1994 | The Beans of Egypt, Maine | Roberta Bean | Nominated—Independent Spirit Award for Best Supporting Female |
| 1995 | Virtuosity | Madison Carter | |
| 1995 | White Man's Burden | Marsha Pinnock | |
| 1996 | Heaven's Prisoners | Annie Robicheaux | |
| 1996 | Persons Unknown | Amanda | |
| 1997 | Cold Around the Heart | Jude Law | |
| 1997 | Mr. Magoo | Luanne LeSeur/Prunella Pagliacci | |
| 1998 | Homegrown | Lucy | |
| 2000 | Charlie's Angels | Vivian Wood | |
| 2001 | Joe Somebody | Callie Scheffer | |
| 2002 | The Slaughter Rule | Evangeline Chutney | |
| 2002 | Searching for Debra Winger | Herself | Documentary film |
| 2003 | Dallas 362 | Mary | |
| 2005 | At Last | Sara Wood | |
| 2005 | The Jacket | Jean Price | |
| 2005 | Welcome to California | Susanna Smith | |
| 2006 | The Visitation | Morgan Elliot | |
| 2007 | Normal Adolescent Behavior | Helen Meyer | |
| 2008 | Visual Acoustics | Herself | Documentary film |
| 2009 | The Perfect Age of Rock 'n' Roll | Maggie | |
| 2009 | A Good Funeral | Junior | |
| 2010 | Kaboom | Nicole | |
| 2010 | Passion Play | Harriet | |
| 2012 | A Dark Plan | Caren | |
| 2012 | The Oyler House: Richard Neutra's Desert Retreat | Herself | Documentary film |
| 2014 | Glass Chin | Mae Graham | |
| 2014 | Seattle Road | Aunt Patty | |
| 2015 | The Frontier | Luanne | |
| 2015 | Kepler's Dream | Amy | |
| 2020 | On the Rocks | Blonde | |
| 2025 | Dead Man's Wire | Mabel Hall | |

=== Television ===
| Year | Title | Role | Notes |
|---|---|---|---|
| 1986 | The Equalizer | Bartender | Episode: "Prelude" |
| 1987 | The Hitchhiker | Teresa / Melissa | Episode: "Joker" |
| 1987 | Miami Vice | Lori 'Blondie' Swann | Episode: "Death and the Lady" |
| 1993 | For Better and for Worse | Catherine Vernet | Television film |
| 1995 | Fallen Angels | Lola | Episode: "Red Wind" |
| 1999 | Brotherhood of Murder | Susan Martinez | Television film |
| 2001 | Ally McBeal | Gloria Albright | Episode: "Boy's Town" |
| 2003 | Homeless to Harvard: The Liz Murray Story | Jean Murray | Television film |
| 2004–2005 | Fatherhood | Angie Bindlebeep | 26 episodes |
| 2004–2009 | The L Word | Ivan Aycock | Recurring role |
| 2005 | Cyber Seduction: His Secret Life | Diane Petersen | Television film |
| 2008 | The Cleaner | Erica Smith | Episode: "Rebecca" |
| 2010–2011 | 90210 | Laurel Cooper | Recurring role, 15 episodes |
| 2011 | Memphis Beat | Marie Minetti | Episode: "Identity Crisis" |
| 2012–2013 | Magic City | Meg Bannock | Recurring role, 13 episodes |
| 2017 | Mr. Mercedes | Deborah Hartsfield | Main role, 10 episodes |
| 2023 | Physical | Felicia Blackwell | Episode: "Like a Rocket" |
