= Ateng =

Ateng may refer to:

- Ateng (actor), Indonesian actor and comedian (1942-2003)
- Ateng (play), a 2005 play by Vincent de Jesus
- Ateng Osorio (1907–1987), film director and screenwriter in the Philippines
- Ateng Wahyudi, mayor of Bunding, West Java, Indonesia (1936-2009)
