= Phillip "Lip" Gallagher =

Phillip "Lip" Gallagher may refer to:

- Phillip "Lip" Gallagher, character on the British version of the TV series Shameless
- Phillip "Lip" Gallagher, character on the American version of the TV series Shameless
