= List of Shameless characters =

List of Shameless characters may refer to:

- List of Shameless (American TV series) characters, a list of characters that appeared on the American version of Shameless
- List of Shameless (British TV series) characters, a list of characters that appeared on the British version of Shameless
