= Ateng (play) =

2005 play by Vincent de Jesus

- Poster for the 2025 production
- Original language: Filipino
- Written by: Vincent de Jesus
- Characters: Juicy; Kiwi; Onyx
- Genre: Black comedy

Ateng is a one-act play written in 2005 by Vincent de Jesus. A dark comedy, Ateng focuses on the lives of LGBTQ Filipinos in 2005, a time when the community had less social acceptance. The play has received the Palanca Award. It was staged for the first time in 2005 at the Virgin Labfest. It was restaged 20 years later at Rampa, a drag club in Quezon City.

== Plot ==
Juicy, a young gay impersonator, spends the money intended for his electricity bill on his self-centered boyfriend, Onyx. Kiwi (Ateng), operator of a beauty salon and Juicy's older sibling, attempts to have Onyx return the money before their electricity is turned off. Kiwi begins using the supplies at the salon to take on Onyx and fight back against his egotistical nature. As family and relationship drama boils over, toxic masculinity and conditional love are revealed as significant issues for the involved characters.

== Critical reception ==
In the 2005 Palanca Awards, the play received the third place award in the "Dulang May Isang Yugto" category. The Manila Bulletin described the play as being deeper than a simple comedy, also shedding light on "how prejudice and abuse toward members of the LGBTQIA+ community prevail in today's society". The author further noted that similar issues still existed in present day, despite having been written 20 years earlier. Allan Policarpio described the play as being driven by emotional abuse and power struggles. He noted that the characters of the play all lived in poverty and each try to "climb [to] a different rung on the social ladder, but in the process, they end up pulling each other down and, at times, are forced into moral corruption". Nikki Francisco of TFM similarly described the play as revealing the continued struggles for the LGBTQ community in the Philippines, adding, "Ateng feels less like a revival and more like an indictment of a long and ongoing stagnation".

== Productions ==
De Jesus picked a drag club, Rampa, as the venue for the first theatrical production of Ateng, which he had described as "the perfect place" for staging the play in an unconventional venue. In November 2025, Ateng was produced by Boy Abunda and RS Francisco. Boy Abunda commented that the play still spoke to salient issues 20 years after it was initially written, and further commented on how the play challenged the idea that "masculinity [is] measured by machismo".
