= List of Shameless (American TV series) characters =

Fictional character list

A variety of fictional characters appear in the American comedy-drama television series Shameless, created by Paul Abbott. First broadcast on Showtime on January 9, 2011, it is based on the British series of the same name, and features many of its characters.

Shameless is set in Chicago's South Side and tells the story of an alcoholic father, Frank Gallagher, and his six children who take care of each other in an attempt to better their lives despite Frank's poor influence. Abbott grew up in a family in the United Kingdom much like that portrayed in the British series.

== Cast overview ==
Legend/Key: (M = Main, G = Guest, R = Recurring role, A = Archive footage)

=== Main ===
Actor	Character	Season										
Actor	Character	1	2	3	4	5	6	7	8	9	10	11
William H. Macy	Frank Gallagher	M	M	M	M	M	M	M	M	M	M	M
Emmy Rossum	Fiona Gallagher	M	M	M	M	M	M	M	M	M		A
Justin Chatwin	Steve Wilton / Jimmy Lishman	M	M	M	G	R						A
Ethan Cutkosky	Carl Gallagher	M	M	M	M	M	M	M	M	M	M	M
Shanola Hampton	Veronica Fisher	M	M	M	M	M	M	M	M	M	M	M
Steve Howey	Kevin "Kev" Ball	M	M	M	M	M	M	M	M	M	M	M
Emma Kenney	Debbie Gallagher	M	M	M	M	M	M	M	M	M	M	M
Cameron Monaghan	Ian Gallagher	M	M	M	M	M	M	M	M	M	M	M
Jeremy Allen White	Phillip "Lip" Gallagher	M	M	M	M	M	M	M	M	M	M	M
Laura Slade Wiggins	Karen Jackson	M	M	R								
Joan Cusack^{[A]}^{[B]}	Sheila Jackson	M	M	M	M	M						
Noel Fisher^{[B]}	Mickey Milkovich	R	R	M	M	M	G	G		G	M	M
Emma Greenwell^{[B]}	Mandy Milkovich^{[C]}	R	R	M	M	G	G					
Zach McGowan	Jody Silverman		R	M								
Jake McDorman^{[B]}	Mike Pratt			R	M							
Emily Bergl^{[B]}	Sammi Slott				R	M						
Isidora Goreshter	Svetlana Yevgenivna			R	R	R	R	M	M			
Richard Flood^{[B]}	Ford Kellogg								R	M		
Christian Isaiah	Liam Gallagher^{[D]}	R	R	R	R	R	R	R	R	M	M	M
Kate Miner	Tami Tamietti									R	M	M

=== Recurring ===
Actor	Character	Season										
Actor	Character	1	2	3	4	5	6	7	8	9	10	11
Michael Patrick McGill	Tommy	R	R	R	R	R	R	R	R	R	R	R
Tyler Jacob Moore	Tony Markovich	R	R	G	G		G					
Pej Vahdat	Kash	R	G									
Marguerite Moreau	Linda	R	G									
Joel Murray	Eddie Jackson	R										
Missy Doty	Jess	R										
Louise Fletcher	Peg Gallagher	G	R									
Dennis Boutsikaris	Professor Hearst	G	R									
Kerry O'Malley	Kate	G	R	R	G							
Madison Davenport	Ethel	R	R									
Amy Smart	Jasmine Hollander	G	R									
Jim Hoffmaster	Kermit	G	R	G	R	R	R	R	R	R	R	R
Alex Borstein	Lou Deckner	G		G	G	G						
James Wolk	Adam Lange		R									
Jack Carter	Stan Kopchek		R		G							
Nicky Korba	Little Hank		R	G								
Justin Mitchell	Malik		R									
Stephanie Fantauzzi	Estefânia		R	R								
Joanna Lee	Hiram "Hymie" Jackson		G	R								
Danika Yarosh	Holly Herkimer^{[E]}		G		R	R						
Harry Hamlin	Lloyd Lishman		G	R	G							
Ed Lauter	Dick Healey		G	R								
J. Michael Trautmann	Iggy Milkovich		G	G		R						
Maile Flanagan	Connie			R	R							
Bernardo de Paula	Beto			R								
Eric Edelstein	Bobby Mallison			R								
Keiko Agena	Brittany Sturgess			R								
Sunkrish Bala	Andy			R								
Bill Brochtrup	Hal			R	G							
Sheldon Bailey	Kenyatta			G	R	G						
Kellen Michael	Charles "Chuckie" Slott				R	R	R					
Nichole Sakura	Amanda				R	R	G					
Teresa Ornelas	Ellie				R	G		G				
James Allen McCune	Matty Baker				R	G						
Adam Cagley	Ron Kuzner				R	G						
Nick Gehlfuss	Robbie Pratt				R							
Various babies and children	Amy Ball				G	R	R	R	R	R	R	R
Various babies and children	Gemma Ball				G	R	R	R	R	R	R	R
Various babies and children	Yevgeny Milkovich				R	R	G	R	R			
Alessandra Balazs	Jackie Scabello				G	R						
Dichen Lachman	Angela				G	R						
Rebecca Metz	Melinda					R	R	R				
Luca Oriel	Derek Delgado^{[F]}					R	G		G			
Christopher Stills	Chris					R	G					
Michael Reilly Burke	Theo Wallace					R	G					
Bojana Novakovic	Bianca Samson					R						
José Julián	Joaquin					G	R	G				
Alan Rosenberg	Professor Youens						R	R	R			
Jaylen Barron	Dominique Winslow						R	R				
Peter Macon	Luther Winslow						R	R				
Jeff Pierre	Caleb						R	G				
Victor Onuigbo	Nick						R					
Paris Newton	Frances Gallagher						R	R	R	R	R	R
Sharon Lawrence	Margo Mierzejewski							R	G	G		
Ruby Modine	Sierra Morton							R	R			
Alicia Coppola	Sue							R	R			
Elliot Fletcher	Trevor							R	R			
Zack Pearlman	Neil Morton							R	R			
Cooper J. Friedman	Lucas Morton							R	R			
Tate Ellington	Chad							R				
Scott Michael Campbell	Brad							G	R	R	R	R
Chet Hanks	Charlie							G	R			
Levy Tran	Eddie								R			
Jessica Szohr	Nessa Chabon								R	G		
Sammi Hanratty	Kassidi Gallagher								R	G		
Melissa Paladino	Cami Tamietti								R	R	R	R
Scarlet Spencer	Alexandra "Xan" Galvez								R	R		
Juliette Angelo	Geneva								R	R	G	
Neal Bledsoe	Max Whitford									R		
Patrick Davis	Jason									R		
Ashley Romans	Alex									R		
Jess Gabor	Kelly Keefe									R	R	
Sarah Colonna	Lori									R	R	
Rebecca Field	Eliza									R		
Chelsea Rendon	Anne Gonzalez										R	
Idara Victor	Sarah										R	
Dylan Gelula	Megan										R	
Danube Hermosillo	Pepa										R	
Rachel Dratch	Paula Bitterman										R	
Constance Zimmer	Claudia Nicolo										R	
Alison Jaye	Julia Nicolo										R	
Elise Eberle	Sandy Milkovich										R	R

=== Special guests ===
Actor	Character	Season										
Actor	Character	1	2	3	4	5	6	7	8	9	10	11
Vanessa Bell Calloway	Carol Fisher	G	G	R	R	R	G				G	R
Dennis Cockrum	Terry Milkovich	R	R	R	R					G	G	R
Chloe Webb	Monica Gallagher^{[G]}	G	R			G		R				A
Bradley Whitford	Abraham Paige			G								
Regina King	Gail Johnson				R							
Jeffrey Dean Morgan	Charlie Peters				G							
Dermot Mulroney	Sean Pierce					R	R		G			
Sasha Alexander	Helene Runyon Robinson					R	R	G				
Steve Kazee	Gus Pfender					R	R					
Sherilyn Fenn	Queenie Slott						R					
June Squibb	Etta Teasdale							R				
John Hennigan	Cody							G				
Luis Guzmán	Mikey O'Shea									R	R	
Bob Saget	Father D'Amico									G		
Dan Lauria	Maurice "Mo" White									R		
Katey Sagal	Ingrid Jones									R		
Courteney Cox	Jen Wagner									G		
Elizabeth Rodriguez	Faye Donahue										R	
Chester Lockhart	Cole										G	

- ^{A} Credited as "Special Guest Star" in the opening title.
- ^{B} Credited only in the episodes they appear.
- ^{C} Portrayed by Jane Levy in season 1 and Emma Greenwell in seasons 2 through 6.
- ^{D} Portrayed by twins Brennan Kane and Blake Alexander Johnson during seasons 1 to 2, by twins Brandon and Brenden Sims from season 2 to season 7, and by Christian Isaiah since season 8.
- ^{E} Portrayed by Dove Cameron in season 2 and Danika Yarosh in seasons 4 and 5.
- ^{F} Portrayed by Luca Oriel during seasons 5 and 6 and by Damien Diaz in season 8.
- ^{G} Parts of her body are seen in season 8.

== Gallagher family ==
=== Frank Gallagher ===
Frank Gallagher
- Shameless (American TV series) character
- First appearance: "Pilot" (2011)
- Last appearance: "Father Frank, Full of Grace" (2021)
- Created by: Paul Abbott
- Portrayed by: William H. Macy; Jacob DeMonte-Finn (young Frank)

In-universe information
- Full name: Francis Gallagher
- Family: Peggy Gallagher (mother); Jerry Gallagher (twin brother); Clayton Gallagher (brother); Lucy Gallagher (sister-in-law); Wyatt Gallagher (brother); Franny Gallagher (granddaughter); Freddie Gallagher (grandson); Chuckie Slott (grandson); Two unnamed grandchildren (via Carl)
- Spouses: Monica Gallagher (ex-wife; deceased)
- Significant others: Queenie Slott (ex-girlfriend); Sheila Jackson (ex-fiancée)
- Children: Fiona Gallagher (daughter); Lip Gallagher (son); Ian Gallagher (son); Debbie Gallagher (daughter); Carl Gallagher (son); Liam Gallagher (son); Sammi Slott (daughter)
- Relatives: Ginger Gallagher (aunt, deceased); Patrick Gallagher (cousin); Ian Gallagher (nephew); Jacob Gallagher (nephew); Kassidi Gallagher (daughter-in-law, deceased)
- Home: Chicago, Illinois
- Cause of death: COVID-19 complications

Francis "Frank" Gallagher (William H. Macy and, in flashbacks, Jacob DeMonte-Finn) is the father of seven children. He is a deadbeat alcoholic and drug addict who relies on his children to get by. He also swindles the state welfare system and taught this type of opportunistic deceit to his children. Since Frank refuses to work and most of the children are underage, the family lives far below the federal poverty threshold for a family of their size. As mentioned by one of his sons, Lip, Frank is intelligent and finished high school before he attended college to study psychology, where he met Monica. They dated for about 2 weeks before he dropped out of school and they got married.

Frank has sex with almost any available woman to support himself. For instance, he begins a relationship with Sheila Jackson when he discovers that she gets maximum disability benefits for her agoraphobia. He is the biological father of Sammi, Fiona, Lip, Debbie, Carl, and Liam, but not to Ian, who is presumed to be the son of Frank's brother Clayton, making him Frank's nephew as well as the children's half-brother and cousin. Despite that, he refers to Ian as his son. Frank is also the grandfather of Chuckie, Frances, Fred, and Carl's unnamed twins (caused by another scam by Frank).

The children do not think highly of him and refer to him primarily by his first name, though there have been occasions where they have called him "Dad". Although Frank preaches self-righteously about political and social issues, he spends most of his time developing schemes to cheat the system and takes advantage of others to make money. He pays little attention to his children but displays care and concern for them in drastic circumstances, having shown on occasion that he does indeed love his children, and at times proves himself to be a better parent than Monica or his own mother.

In season 1, he is introduced as an alcoholic deadbeat who neglects his children after his wife abandons the family. The older Gallagher children resent him while the younger ones still have faith in him. After returning from Canada (illegally taken there by Fiona's boyfriend Steve), Frank gloms on to Sheila Jackson, mother to Lip's friends-with-benefits girlfriend Karen, after finding out that she lives on government benefits for her agoraphobia. He attempts to cash a settlement check only to find that he needs it to be signed by his estranged wife Monica and tracks her down. She agrees to sign the check on the condition that he give up their youngest child Liam so that she and her new girlfriend can raise him. Frank learns through two paternity tests that he is indeed Liam's father but not Ian, who is the result of an affair. The pair make amends after the event and Frank walks away.

In season 2, his mother Peggy is released from prison and the root of Frank's bad parenting is revealed to stem from his own childhood with his abusive parents. The main factor was his mother, who was often neglectful and condescending of him and left him scarred. Frank finds himself at her beck and call, as she puts him down at any opportunity. A saddened Frank finds comfort in Fiona, who now sees what her father went through as a child and finds him better than Peggy. After Peggy moves in to Frank's house, Frank's former trauma returns, such as his bedwetting and being his mother's personal servant. He briefly contemplates killing his mother in her sleep, but continues to assist her as her health deteriorates. After Sheila suffocates Peggy to death, he rejoices at being free of his mother's influence.

During Season 3, Frank calls Child Protective Services (CPS) on Fiona out of spite, which results in Frank being kicked out of the house (when his actions are discovered by his family). During the ensuing CPS custody hearing, the court allows Frank to retain parental rights of his minor-children, yet Fiona is named as legal guardian. During Frank's exile from the Gallagher house, he and Carl form a close personal bond while stealing from Carl's former foster parents. When the police try to arrest Carl, Frank takes full responsibility for the theft and is arrested while Carl, Lip, and Ian look on. Frank is released when his liver fails as a result of his chronic alcoholism. Initially, Frank is in denial of his alcoholism, however he is soon hospitalized when he becomes jaundiced and collapses. Upon admission to the hospital, it is revealed that Frank is suffering from acute liver failure as a result of alcoholism induced hepatic cirrhosis. Fiona tells Frank that she loves him and wishes he would show his love to the family, as she fears Frank does not care about his children.

In Season 4, Frank returns home and is tended to by Carl. After Fiona refuses to help him by donating her liver, he reveals the existence of his eldest daughter Sammi, much to Fiona's shock. Frank and Carl track down Sammi, where he finds her with a child of her own. Although she is initially not aware of their connection, Frank accidentally reveals the truth after he learns she is not a match for a liver transplant, which causes her to kick him out. Later on, Sammi tracks him down and they reconcile. Due to him having parental rights, Frank is needed to reclaim a hospitalized Liam. Afterwards, Sammi, Carl, and Sheila go out of their way to arrange Frank's liver surgery. They find an unlicensed Bangladeshi surgeon willing to do the operation, using a Bangladeshi donor but the surgeon makes off with the money and one of Frank's kidneys, leaving him with his original failing liver. Nevertheless, Frank is supplied with a healthy liver when his condition deteriorates and pushes him to the top of the donor list. Afterwards, he shares a drink with Carl to thank him for his help and rejoices at surviving the ordeal.

In season 5, a home beer brewing mishap causes Sheila to leave for good. He moves back into the house, asserting himself as their father and refusing to leave. Sammi forces herself and her son Chuckie to live with the rest of the Gallaghers to care for Frank but his refusal to appreciate and acknowledge her makes her shoot Frank in the arm. Frank gets payback by implicating his grandson Chuckie for Carl's heroin smuggling attempt. In episode 9, Frank embarks on a "bucket list" style spree with a doctor named Bianca, who has advanced pancreatic cancer. They spend Bianca's last days together and although some of Bianca's thrill-seeking tendencies are too much for Frank, they end up in Costa Rica. After leaving a note for Frank, Bianca commits suicide by walking naked into the ocean. Frank returns home distraught and tells Lip and Ian that Bianca has died.

In season 6, he supports Debbie's pregnancy and reconnects with his ex-girlfriend Queenie (Sammi's mother). He is initially supportive of Fiona and Sean's wedding, and tries to gather money to pay for a reception so that he can walk Fiona down the aisle. Fiona is fine with him helping, however Sean is not convinced. When Sean later challenges Frank's authority, a brawl breaks out between the two. Afterwards, Frank seeks revenge, breaking into Patsy's. He finds that Sean has relapsed and has been taking heroin regularly, having kept it a secret from Fiona and his young son Will. At the wedding, Frank arrives uninvited and reveals that Sean has relapsed, causing Will to angrily leave. As a result, the Gallagher kids and friends throw him off a bridge into a near-frozen river, hoping that he dies.

In Season 7, he is shown to have survived the fall, and falls into a coma for a month in a hospital. He awakens with brief amnesia. He returns to the Alibi and everyone is surprised that he survived. Frank recalls them throwing him off the bridge and is angry at the pain they put him through, as well as the fact that no one looked for him during the month he was comatose. Kevin is the only person who feels guilty. Frank attempts to go back to his house, where he is depressed to learn from Carl that no one looked for him because they hoped he was dead. Fiona kicks Frank out of the house and the other children do the same. Hurt by this, he "disowns" them (except Liam) and attempts to start over with a "new" family he finds at a homeless shelter. Frank and his new family crash a realtor's showing of a house on his block. When the realtor calls the cops, he manipulates them into thinking the old owner okayed it. Frank establishes the home as a homeless shelter and attracts the attention and money of a wealthy philanthropist. Frank basks in his fortune and accumulates even more by manipulating the patrons of his shelter into earning money. He is eventually thrown out a window when the homeless patrons find out he's been hoarding the money they've earned. He suffers an injured arm and leg before he tries to burn the house in revenge, scaring some. Instead, he helps Liam get into a private school. Near the end of the season, he is allowed to return to his old home after he starts making amends with the family, including helping fix up the house with some stolen possessions from the shelter. Frank is reunited with Monica and falls back into their old habits, only to be devastated when she dies from brain damage. He is later attacked by Monica's enraged father and shares touching words at her funeral before leaving heartbroken. Afterwards, he is allowed to return home with all animosity ended and he is once again accepted by his children.

In season 8, Frank copes with Monica's death by consuming meth she gave him, before having a midlife crisis where he decides to restart his life as a 21-year-old, having realized that Monica was the trigger of his alcoholism and bad parenting. As a result, he becomes sober and starts going by Francis to disassociate from his past. He cleans his hygiene up, gets a real job, makes amends with his family and friends, buys a car, and tries to be a more productive member of society. While his children believe Frank has lost it, he proves his change is genuine by protecting his family from an armed meth head who was Monica's partner, earning him Fiona's gratitude. Frank soon bonds with his youngest son Liam and acts more fatherly to him, as he sees Liam as his last chance to be a proper parent. However, when the hardware store chain he is working at shuts down and he is unable to find new employment, Frank starts to fall back into his old ways.

During Season 9, he reverts to his old self and sleeps with many of the mothers in the PTA and secretly stealing from them to pawn their belongings. After an STD outbreak sweeps through the PTA, Frank is revealed to be the source. Because of this, his son Liam is expelled from private school and forced to attend public school. Frank also nominates former congressman Mo White during a congressional election as a part of a scam to earn money, though he ends up with second thoughts after the man is revealed to be a sex offender. Despite that, he continues on as campaign manager and attempts to win the election by any means necessary, going as far as recruiting Terry Milkovich to intimidate voters. Mo wins the race, but Frank is fired as campaign manager. He later ends up in the hospital for his liver and meets a bipolar woman named Ingrid who catches his interest. He starts a relationship with her and they go on to have a series of adventures. Ingrid asks Frank to fertilize her eggs but since his habits have left him sterile, he bribes Carl into donating sperm, and Ingrid finds herself pregnant with six fetuses. As he is financially insecure, he enters a local contest to win money. Ingrid realizes Frank cannot be depended upon and returns to her ex-husband, who pays Frank to stay away. Frank mostly falls back into his old habits again and bonds with Fiona after she spirals into alcoholism. Frank injures his leg and is rendered out of commission for months, which forces his children to hire a nurse for him. When Fiona leaves for good, he wishes his daughter luck while thanking her for what she has done.

In Season 10, Frank recovers from his injuries and resumes his old habits. He reunites with his old friend Mikey and they carry out a series of scams. He becomes a grandfather to Lip's son Freddy. When Mikey is sent to prison, Frank continues his scams. Very soon, Frank is visited by his ex-girlfriend's husband who tried to pawn off her twins. Frank later reveals that the babies are actually Carl's, much to the latter's shock.

In Season 11, Frank is diagnosed with alcohol-induced dementia, causing him to forget things. His health continues to decline throughout the season, before he falls into a coma in the series finale. At the hospital, it is implied that he has contracted coronavirus before succumbing indulges to have flashbacks of his children and his memories of them, before he passes away flying up into the sky on a chair over his family celebrating in the street oblivious and/or indifferent to his passing.

=== Fiona Gallagher ===
Fiona Gallagher
- Shameless (American TV series) character
- First appearance: "Pilot" (2011)
- Last appearance: "Father Frank, Full of Grace" (2021)
- Created by: Paul Abbott
- Portrayed by: Emmy Rossum

In-universe information
- Full name: Fiona Monica Gallagher
- Occupation: Telemarketer (formerly); Waitress at Patsy's Pies (formerly); Manager at Patsy's Pies (formerly); Landlord (formerly)
- Family: Frank Gallagher (father, deceased); Monica Gallagher (mother, deceased); Lip Gallagher (brother/adopted son); Debbie Gallagher (sister/adopted daughter); Liam Gallagher (brother/adopted son); Carl Gallagher (brother/adopted son); Ian Gallagher (half-brother/cousin/adopted son); Sammi Slott (half-sister); Mickey Milkovich (brother-in-law); Kassidi Gallagher (sister-in-law, deceased); Peggy Gallagher (paternal grandmother, deceased); Bill Dargen (maternal grandfather)
- Spouse: Gus Pfender (ex-husband)
- Significant others: Jimmy Lishman (ex-boyfriend); Mike Pratt (ex-boyfriend); Robbie Pratt (ex-lover); Sean Pierce (ex-boyfriend); Ford Kellogg (ex-boyfriend)
- Relatives: Jerry Gallagher (uncle); Clayton Gallagher (uncle); Lucy Gallagher (aunt-by-marriage); Jacob Gallagher (cousin); Wyatt Gallagher (uncle); Franny Gallagher (niece); Freddie Gallagher (nephew); Chuckie Slott (nephew); Two unnamed nieces and nephews (via Carl); Patrick Gallagher (cousin-once-removed); Ginger Gallagher (great aunt, deceased)
- Home: Chicago, Illinois

Fiona Monica Gallagher (Emmy Rossum), aged 21–30, is the eldest of the Gallagher children. As a result of her mother's absence and Frank's neglect, most of the responsibility for child-rearing falls on her shoulders, which forces her out of high school in her junior year. Fiona works a few dead-end minimum-wage jobs to support her five siblings. Though often stressed and exhausted, she always carries out her responsibilities. Prone to selflessness, she sometimes needs to be reminded to look out for her own happiness.

In Season 1, Fiona begins a relationship with Steve Wilton and juggles her own desire for happiness with her responsibilities towards her siblings. At the end of the season, she is distraught to learn of Steve's illicit activities and, despite an invitation to run away with him to Brazil, stays in Chicago with her family.

In Season 2, she shows that she loves her father in spite of his neglect after she witnesses her previously imprisoned grandmother's abusive treatment of him. Fiona comforts him and sees his bad parenting stems from Frank's mother. Steve returns, but Fiona is shocked to find that he is married to a Brazilian woman named Estefania, that his real name is Jimmy Lishman, and that he is the son of wealthy parents. Although these revelations strain their relationship, they eventually reconcile. At the end of season 2, Fiona receives her GED and begins to take more interest in jobs.

In season 3, she and Jimmy are officially a couple. However, they have difficulty finding balance between their relationship, taking care of the Gallagher household, and Jimmy's green card marriage to Estefania. After Frank calls social services out of spite, Fiona wins a court case and is finally appointed her siblings' legal guardian, though Frank maintains parental rights, which strains her relationship with Jimmy. Towards the end of season 3, Fiona gets a better paid job as a telemarketer for a cup manufacturing company, although Jimmy leaves.

In season 4, she moves up in her job and finally manages to financially support her family. However, she refuses to help her ailing father with his liver. She is shocked to learn that Frank has a previously unknown older daughter. Fiona begins dating her boss Mike and finds her life finally looking up. However, she soon sleeps with Mike's alcoholic brother, Robbie; when Mike finds out, he breaks up with her. After the breakup, Robbie brings her cocaine as an apology. Though, she chases him out she keeps the cocaine which Liam ingests and is hospitalized. Fiona is arrested for child neglect and drug possession. Mike posts her bail and she is put under house arrest forcing Lip to fill in as guardian. Fiona quickly goes stir crazy and can't stand the fact her life is upended and confronts Robbie, leading her to break probation by partying with Robbie, she is incarcerated with a 90-day sentence. She is released shortly after due to overcrowding and good behavior. Her parole officer gets her a job at a diner and she regains custody of her siblings.

In season 5, Fiona impulsively marries Gus Pfender, the bassist of an indie rock band. She then cheats on Gus with Jimmy when he appears in town once again. Her extramarital affair with Jimmy, along with her budding relationship with her manager, Sean, end her marriage. She begins dating Sean afterwards. She discovers she is pregnant shortly after Debbie does, though she is unsure as to who the father is. She urges a reluctant Debbie to get an abortion and eventually gets one herself. During season 6 she gets the house back after the bank evicts them. By the end of season 6, Fiona and Sean plan to get married, but Frank ruins their happiness on their wedding day by revealing that Sean has continued using heroin behind Fiona's back, causing Sean to leave.

At the start of season 7, Fiona becomes manager at Patsy's Pies in Sean's absence and refuses to deal with the fallout of her aborted wedding. Tired of being unappreciated by her family members and realizing they're too old for her to take care of now, she makes rules of how they need to contribute to the household much to their anger. She bans Frank from the house, despite appreciating him for saving her from marrying Sean. She learns her boss, Margo, is also a high-school dropout but has amassed a net worth of $300 million, and Fiona wants to follow in her footsteps. She sees an opportunity to invest in a deteriorating laundromat and uses the Gallagher home as collateral, which angers Lip. She manages to turn Patsy's Pies and the laundromat into major successes earning her major profit and a raise. She eventually sells the laundromat to Margo and buys an apartment building.

When Monica dies, Fiona is indifferent and declares her willingness to have the funeral consist of a bonfire in the funeral home parking lot using the ashes stored in a bag. Fiona buries her portion of the inheritance meth in Monica's casket. She lets Frank return home after reconciling with him.

In season 8, she becomes the owner of an apartment building. She begins to be more independent while still assisting her family. Toward the end of the season, she begins seeing a dashing Irish man named Ford.

In Season 9, Fiona tries to help Ian with his situation while others tell her to let him settle it himself. Fiona realizes that she cannot always help and is pleased when Ian handles it. She continues to handle her business and starts investing while continuing her relationship with Ford. However, she learns Ford is married and goes bankrupt following a bad investment. She is forced to sell her building and falls into a drunk slump. Fiona finds solace when Debbie gives her a chance to humiliate Ford as revenge for his deceit. As a result of her downward spiral, her role as caretaker falls into Debbie's hands. Her drunken antics result in her being fired from the pie shop and being arrested for assaulting a neighbor. Eventually, Lip kicks her out when she accidentally gets his Alcoholics Anonymous sponsee drunk. Fiona's habits warrant Frank's attention who also tells her to check herself. After waking up after a night of drinking in her former apartment building, she attends an AA meeting and gets a job at the advice of her attorney. While working at a gas station, she learns from an old business partner that her bad investment has finally come through for her and has garnered her a large sum of money. The man offers to buy her out, giving her $100,000. Quitting her job, she visits Ian in prison, who tells her to leave her past behind and that the family would always be there for her. She realizes her siblings have grown up and no longer need her; advice from Ian cements her decision to leave Chicago. Fiona's family try to throw a party to see her off, but she resolves to leave beforehand, afraid that she will have second thoughts and stay. She amicably parts with her father, who thanks her for all she has done. Before leaving, she leaves her family a check for $50,000 and leaves Chicago on an airplane.

=== Phillip Gallagher ===
Lip Gallagher
- Shameless (American TV series) character
- First appearance: "Pilot" (2011)
- Last appearance: "Father Frank, Full of Grace" (2021)
- Created by: Paul Abbott
- Portrayed by: Jeremy Allen White

In-universe information
- Full name: Philip Ronan Gallagher
- Occupation: College student (formerly); Dishwasher at Patsy's (formerly); Intern (formerly); Mechanic (formerly); Door Dash driver (currently)
- Family: Frank Gallagher (father, deceased); Monica Gallagher (mother, deceased); Fiona Gallagher (sister/adopted mother); Carl Gallagher (brother); Debbie Gallagher (sister); Liam Gallagher (brother); Ian Gallagher (half-brother); Mickey Milkovich (brother-in-law); Kassidi Gallagher (sister-in-law, deceased); Peggy Gallagher (paternal grandmother, deceased); Bill Dargen (maternal grandfather)
- Significant others: Karen Jackson (ex-lover); Mandy Milkovich (ex-girlfriend); Amanda (ex-girlfriend); Helene Runyon (ex-lover); Tami Tamietti (girlfriend)
- Children: Freddie Gallagher (son)
- Relatives: Jerry Gallagher (uncle); Clayton Gallagher (uncle); Lucy Gallagher (aunt-by-marriage); Jacob Gallagher (cousin); Wyatt Gallagher (uncle); Franny Gallagher (niece); Chuckie Slott (nephew); Two unnamed nieces and nephews (via Carl); Patrick Gallagher (cousin-once-removed); Ginger Gallagher (great aunt, deceased)
- Home: Chicago, Illinois
- Born: March 29th, 1995

Phillip Ronan "Lip" Gallagher (Jeremy Allen White) aged 16–26, is the second Gallagher child and the most academically minded. In high school, he was a straight-A student. He created various money-making schemes to help the Gallagher clan survive, such as running an ice cream truck that also sold beer and marijuana, and fraudulently taking the SAT's for classmates for a fee; this latter scheme is thwarted by Professor Hearst, an investigator from the Educational Evaluation Service. After testing Lip in private, Hearst discovers Lip is one of the statistically very rare students capable of achieving a perfect SAT score and offers him an internship at the robotics lab at the University of Chicago, which Lip turns down. Hearst gets Lip in trouble with his past clients by invalidating all of their SAT scores, since they didn't actually take the tests themselves. In addition to being adept scientifically, Lip, like his father, is multilingual; in season 2, he speaks Portuguese and Italian, and in season 4, he speaks Spanish.

Outside the classroom, Lip spends much of his time drinking beer, smoking weed, and eventually participating in car theft schemes with Jimmy. Lip has a strong bond with Ian and is the first one to discover that Ian is gay. During the first season of the show, while tutoring Karen Jackson in physics, Lip develops a sexual relationship with her, and soon falls in love with her, despite his refusal to commit. In season 2, Karen reveals to be pregnant with, what is believed to be, Lip's baby. Despite some initial hesitance, Lip looks forward to being a father and is devastated when the child is not his.

Lip starts a new relationship with Mandy Milkovich. They live together from season 2 until season 3; Lip briefly lived at her house and she eventually moved herself in with the Gallaghers. Though Mandy and Lip have an insatiable sexual relationship, he is annoyed when the relationship becomes more domestic and Mandy becomes "clingy". When Mandy discovers Lip does not plan on going to college, she believes that he is wasting his potential and his chances for a brighter future. When she secretly applies to colleges on his behalf, he is accepted by MIT, among others. Lip breaks off their relationship when he learns that Mandy hit Karen with her car, an accident that resulted in serious injuries and brain damage, to keep Karen from him. Despite some setbacks, Lip graduates from high school, which the family celebrates.

In season 4, Lip begins courses at Chicago Polytechnic. He struggles to balance his studies, his job at the cafeteria, and his family life. Lip's new girlfriend Amanda helps him and his grades improve. He takes over as caregiver for the house when Liam ingests Fiona's cocaine and she is arrested.

In season 5, Lip works for Tommy in construction. At Amanda's summer home, Lip and Amanda's father initially do not get along. However, Amanda's father offers Lip an internship when they find some common ground. Lip starts to turn his life around but is challenged when Mickey and his brothers plan to raid a café. After the raid, Mickey locks Lip out of the getaway car, leaving him to hide from the police. Despite difficulties in paying for his education, Lip receives a grant and also begins an affair with a professor named Helene Runyon. Helene invites Lip into her home and her husband catches them, but condones the affair due to an apparent taste for voyeurism. Because of his affair with the much more worldly Helene, Lip starts losing interest in Amanda, and she eventually punches him in the face when he reveals he did not take their relationship as seriously as she was.

In season 6, Amanda gets her revenge by posting a naked picture of Helene online. This causes Helene to get fired and her relationship with Lip to end. Lip has trouble getting over her until Queenie uses reflexology to give him a foot massage that arouses him and "cures" his stress. He is later fired as a resident assistant and takes a job as a sorority's houseboy for the free room and board. He begins working as a teacher's assistant for an alcoholic professor named Clyde Youens, whom he befriends. However, he begins drinking to cope with his break-up with Helene and it soon spirals out of control, resulting in a stay in the hospital for alcohol poisoning and being fired from his job as house boy after he drunkenly urinates on the house mother. When he learns Youens stole his work he smashes up Youens' car in a fit of rage. Lip gets arrested but is bailed out by Professor Youens who takes pity on him and informs him he has been expelled. Youens pays for Lip to go to rehab and sets him up with a job for when he gets out.

In season 7, Lip adjusts to sobriety and begins working as an intern at a sketchy tech company that is eventually shut down due to an FBI investigation. He then gets a job at Patsy's Pies working for Fiona. In this season, he becomes more contentious; Lip believes that because his internship can lead to a 6-figure income, that he is the one who should be the breadwinner of the family and that Fiona's job is not enough, which makes Fiona leave the house and vow to stop taking care of everyone else. He meets a girl named Sierra who also works at Patsy's, and they become friends with benefits, although the relationship eventually develops into something more. Youens tries to convince Lip to go back to college; Lip agrees to attend an appeals hearing, but is denied because of his previous actions. The rejection causes him to relapse into drinking and start a fight with Sierra's ex-boyfriend, causing Sierra to break up with Lip. He then goes on a few benders and ends up breaking into Helene's house whilst drunk; she proceeds to tell him to sort himself out and "move on". He leaves weeping. At the end of the season, Lip attends his mother's funeral and decides he wants to stop drinking and confesses to Sierra that he wants to go back to college.

During season 8, he attends AA meetings and gets a job as a motorcycle mechanic. Lip is one of the few put off by his father's change but is pleased by him putting in the effort. He starts a fling with a coworker named Eddie (Levy Tran); he later makes amends with Sierra and reconciles their relationship. However, in the season finale, he tells her to make amends with her child's father and states that although he does love her, he is unsure how to, given that he was drunk the majority of their relationship. He takes in Xan Galvez the daughter of Eddie's half sister, Mercy, who is left abandoned when Eddie skips town with a fling. Mercy comes back in s09e04, demanding Xan back which devolves into a screaming match with Lip accusing Mercy of using Xan to collect benefits and then abandoning Xan again.

In season 9, he continues to care for Xan and tries to apply to be her guardian, but his attempt is prevented by Fiona's actions, which leads to a social worker relieving him of Xan and warding Xan in the foster care system. He starts a relationship with a girl named Tami, who belittles his sexual prowess until he redeems himself. Lip later part ways with Ian who is serving a two-year prison term for arson. He makes progress in his AA classes and becomes a sponsor to another alcoholic. Lip and Tami find out they are expecting and they decide to have the baby and make the relationship work. She gives birth to their son "Freddie" in the first episode of season 10. He struggles to adjust to fatherhood, but is reassured by Frank. In season 10, Lip moves Tami into an RV parked in the backyard. Tami's father is dismayed at this and gives his daughter a senior aunt's house in Milwaukee, Wisconsin but Lip expresses doubt over moving and Tami dumps him briefly and moves to Milwaukee but later comes back.

In season 11, Lip and Tami move into a rental house together and seem to be in a good place, but the bike shop where Lip works is bought out and he is fired. He tries to find ways to make money, from stealing bikes from the shop and selling them, to doing freelancing work such as repairing a toy car for a man's birthday gift, but money becomes tight. Eventually, their rental house is sold by the owner, forcing him to move back to the Gallagher house, while Tami moves in with her Dad. He decides to sell the Gallagher house so he and his siblings can spilt the money and move on, a plan which is vehemently opposed by Debbie. Tami pressures Lip to apply for jobs, but he struggles finding anything. He eventually works as a delivery driver for a food app, making low wages and little tips, while remodeling the Gallagher home to put it on the market. He later learns that a developer is buying properties on the block to demolish and rebuild. He attempts to negotiate a high selling price for the house, but the offer falls through. In the series finale, Tami tells Lip that she thinks she's pregnant, while he receives a much lower offer for the Gallagher house.

=== Ian Gallagher ===
Ian Clayton Gallagher (Cameron Monaghan), aged 15–24, is the third of the Gallagher children. Although initially believed to be Frank's son, a DNA test reveals that he is actually the son of one of Frank's brothers (presumably Clayton), making him the cousin as well as half-brother to the other Gallagher children. At the beginning of the series, Ian participates in Army JROTC and works at the Kash and Grab grocery store. He begins a sexual relationship with his boss, Kash, although this is short-lived. Ian eventually comes out to his family about his sexuality.

Ian develops a complicated relationship with his neighbor, Mickey Milkovich. At the end of season 3, after learning Mickey impregnated and married a Russian prostitute, Ian runs away. It is later revealed that he enlisted in the Army using his brother Lip's identity, as he is still underage. In season 4, it is revealed that he deserted training camp, attempted to steal an army helicopter, and is being pursued by Army MPs. He is eventually apprehended, though ultimately released into his family's care.

When season 4 begins, he works as a bartender and a dancer at a gay bar called The White Swallow while squatting in an abandoned house. Lip and Debbie track him down and try to persuade him to return home. Ian's behavior becomes more and more erratic and he is diagnosed with bipolar disorder, just like Monica. Ian is offered treatment but refuses it despite his family's encouragement.

In season 5, Ian becomes manic when Mickey suggests taking him to a hospital, and drives off with Mickey's infant son Yevgeny to Indiana. After locking Yevgeny in the car, Ian is confronted by the police. He tries to flee with Yevgeny but is cornered in a grocery store and makes it obvious he is suffering from mental disability. He is released from the psych ward into Monica's care. When Monica takes Ian to live in her trailer, he discovers she is using methamphetamine and he leaves. He returns to the Gallagher household and by the end of the season has ended his relationship with Mickey, citing his mental illness.

In season 6, Ian visits Mickey in prison. Mickey asks Ian if he'll wait for him, but Ian has convinced himself that he's over Mickey. After being tired of being bossed around by Fiona, Ian quits his job at Patsy's Pies, and Lip gets him a job as a janitor at his college. Ian thinks Lip and his friends are making fun of him and they get into a fight. When Ian sees a car crash occur, he rescues a woman from a burning car. He passes out and is saved by a firefighter. Ian eventually meets a firefighter named Caleb with a father who disapproves of his being gay. Caleb encourages Ian to apply to be an EMT and convinces Ian to lie about his bipolar disorder on the application. His deception is soon discovered, but Ian convinces his boss to let him keep his job despite his mental illness. Despite initially being in denial, he soon comes to accept and take pride in his mental illness. At the end of the season, he helps throw Frank off the bridge following Fiona's aborted wedding.

In season 7, Ian discovers that Caleb has been cheating on him with his female friend from high school and they break up. Ian then meets a trans man named Trevor, who he begins dating and helps him learn more about the LGBTQ+ community. Ian is shocked to learn that Mickey has escaped from prison. Mickey soon contacts him and asks Ian to run away to Mexico with him, which Ian accepts. However, at the Mexican border, Ian realizes that he has changed and decides not to go, devastating Mickey. Ian tells Mickey that he loves him, and the two kiss before parting ways. Ian reveals all of this to Trevor, and the two break up.

In season 8, Ian and Trevor remain friends, and Ian begins helping out at the homeless LGBT youth shelter where Trevor works. He is skeptical of Frank changing his ways, though reconsiders after Frank threatens an armed killer to protect the family. After learning of children being forced to attend conversion camps by their parents, Ian takes up a crusade and inadvertently becomes the face of a movement, "Gay Jesus". Things spiral out of control and end with his arrest after blowing up a van.

In season 9, Ian is released from jail after making bail, although he faces years in prison for his actions. His behavior continues to be erratic, but after realizing how out-of-control his life and the movement have become, he goes back on his meds and takes responsibility for his actions, ultimately leading him to plead not guilty by reason of insanity. Ian is sentenced to two years in prison in the end and is seen off by Carl, Lip, Liam, Kev, and V after Fiona fails to show up to drive him to prison. In prison, Ian is shocked to discover that his new cellmate is Mickey and the two resume their relationship. He is visited by Fiona in the finale, where they share a heartfelt reunion and she tells him of what's been going on in his absence. She soon reveals her desire to make a fresh start and he encourages it. In the end, he spots the plane Fiona is in and smiles, silently wishing his sister well.

During season 10, Ian continues his relationship with Mickey, but they have problems due to the stress of jail and Ian's impending parole hearing. They make amends when Mickey smuggles a burner phone in jail for Ian to meet his nephew Freddie. Ian is later released on parole and is assigned to an eccentric and corrupt officer. Despite mixed feelings on his return, Ian is welcomed home with a party thrown by his friends and family. In the season finale, Ian and Mickey attempt to get married, only to have Terry burn down their wedding venue. Ian's friends and family come together to plan a new ceremony on short notice at a polka hall owned by an old flame of Frank's. Though Terry again tries to interrupt, Ian's former Gay Jesus followers step in to keep Terry from succeeding. Ian and Mickey are married and drive off to their honeymoon in a Mercedes owned by Frank's ex Faye. Terry shoots up their honeymoon suite, though neither Ian or Mickey is hurt.

In Season 11, Ian tries to have a "normal" life with Mickey. They move to the West side of Chicago, where the two of them struggle to meet new friends and adapt to the peaceful, quiet life of the neighborhood. After Terry is accidentally paralyzed by Liam, he is murdered by a nun that Ian and Mickey had hired to be his caretaker who is implied to be a serial killer.

=== Debbie Gallagher ===
Debbie Gallagher
- Shameless (American TV series) character
- First appearance: "Pilot" (2011)
- Last appearance: "Father Frank, Full of Grace" (2021)
- Created by: Paul Abbott
- Portrayed by: Emma Kenney

In-universe information
- Full name: Deborah Margaret Jean Gallagher
- Occupation: Welder (currently); Daycare worker (former)
- Family: Frank Gallagher (father, deceased); Monica Gallagher (mother, deceased); Fiona Gallagher (sister/adopted mother); Lip Gallagher (brother); Carl Gallagher (brother); Liam Gallagher (brother); Ian Gallagher (half-brother); Sammi Slott (half-sister); Mickey Milkovich (brother-in-law); Kassidi Gallagher (sister-in-law, deceased); Peggy Gallagher (paternal grandmother, deceased); Bill Darrgen (maternal grandfather)
- Significant others: Derek Delgado (ex-boyfriend); Neil Morton (ex-fiancé); Alexandra (ex-girlfriend); Claudia Nicolo (ex-girlfriend); Sandy Milkovich (ex-girlfriend); Heidi (girlfriend)
- Children: Franny Gallagher (daughter)
- Relatives: Jerry Gallagher (uncle); Clayton Gallagher (uncle); Lucy Gallagher (aunt-by-marriage); Jacob Gallagher (cousin); Wyatt Gallagher (uncle); Freddie Gallagher (nephew); Chuckie Slott (nephew); Two unnamed nieces or nephew (via Carl); Patrick Gallagher (cousin-once-removed); Ginger Gallagher (great aunt, deceased)
- Home: Chicago, Illinois

Deborah Margaret Jean "Debbie" Gallagher (Emma Kenney), aged 10–20, is one of the middle Gallagher children. Debbie covers for others but is not brash or reckless like her older brothers. She forgives her father's neglect and irresponsibility as well as her mother's absence. She is very mature in some ways and has trouble making friends with people her own age. Like her siblings, Debbie knows clever ways to make money at a young age and runs a daycare business in the early seasons. She is one of the few Gallagher children to get along with Frank and even call him Dad on several occasions, although her tolerance of Frank's actions wanes over the years.

In the early seasons, Debbie is often stressed by her adult responsibilities but is upset that she doesn't get the recognition for it. When she was a child, she called out Fiona for making her play both sides and was told to "act like a kid" by Fiona when Child Protective Services come over, despite Fiona wanting her to contribute like an adult when bills need to get paid.

In season 2, she meets her paternal grandmother, and they bond when she gifts Debbie a laptop that she continues to own for most of the series.

In season 3, Debbie becomes a teenager and is more rebellious, disrespectful, and secretive like her siblings.

In season 4, her friends Holly and Ellie glamorize sexual promiscuity. Debbie meets the twenty-year-old Matty and tries to seduce him but is rejected because of their age disparity. Debbie becomes jealous of Matty's girlfriend, Seema. Debbie makes harassing calls to Seema at work, puts a snake in her car, and plans to stab Seema with a homemade shank. As revenge, Seema hires a boy in Debbie's class to humiliate her. Matty then breaks up with Seema and says he has committed himself to Debbie because even though Debbie was horrible first, Seema "is the adult." In season 5, Debbie has a falling out with Holly and Ellie and continues to desperately pursue a first sexual encounter. At a party, Debbie seduces an intoxicated Matty, after which he leaves and tells her to never speak to him again.

Debbie then meets Derek and begins a relationship with him. By the end of the season, she gets pregnant on purpose in the hopes that it will make Derek want to marry her, believing a happy family is the solution to all of her troubles. Derek, unable to accept the responsibilities of fatherhood and angry at Debbie for deceiving him, moves in with his grandparents in Florida and cuts off all contact with Debbie. Derek's family points out that Debbie was too busy trying to trap Derek into fatherhood and marriage that she never listened to his hopes and dreams. Despite this, Debbie resolves to keep the baby, still believing Derek will return. Her decision to have a child creates a major rift between herself and Fiona, who refuses to raise yet another child, resulting in Debbie briefly living elsewhere temporarily. Debbie gives birth to a baby girl named Frances Harriet Gallagher (named after Frank) on the Gallagher's kitchen table towards the end of season 6. She initially struggles with new motherhood, but refuses help from her family, although she later gives in after exhaustion causes her to accidentally drop Franny. At the end of the season, she helps throw Frank off the bridge following Fiona's aborted wedding.

In season 7, Debbie continues to struggle as a single mom, especially with Fiona threatening to kick her out if she cannot pay her share of the rent. She renamed her daughter following her falling out with Frank but later changed it back after resorting to go to her father for help. She considers several avenues for making money, including prostitution and panhandling. DCFS pays her a visit after a video of her fighting a woman while holding Franny is posted online. Debbie's perceived failures as a mother causes Derek's family to take Franny away, although Debbie later regains custody with Monica's help. In an effort to provide a better life for her daughter, Debbie takes the GED and drops out of high school and enrolls in welding school. She also begins a relationship of convenience with Sierra's disabled brother, Neil, and moves in with him.

In season 8, she combines working in a parking lot while taking care of her daughter. She begins hanging out with some friends from her welding classes, including a man she later has sex with. Her involvement in her social life causes her to neglect Neil, who breaks up with her. Faced with the need to earn money to continue paying for her welding classes, she begins working clandestine welding jobs at night. However, she is later injured on the job when a large pipe crushes her foot. She can't afford the cost of the operation to fix her toes, so Frank helps her amputate them, Gallagher style. She is stunned when Derek returns, resolved to be involved in his daughter's life. He later offers shared custody, which Debbie rejects.

In season 9, she begins working as a welder on a stable basis. Talking to her classmates, she realizes that she earns less than her male colleagues and begins fighting for an equal wage. Through this fight against the patriarchy, she meets a woman named Alexandra, and they become friends. However, the two later hook up, causing Debbie to come to terms with her sexuality. However, the relationship comes to an end when Alex believes Debbie is merely going through a phase and does not want to be hurt by another straight girl. Debbie becomes over obsessed with Kelly believing her as a friend, Carl's girlfriend much to Carl's annoyance and accusations of lesbianism, but when Debbie attempts to confirm the relationship, Debbie is cruelly rejected. Debbie begins to assume more responsibility in the Gallagher household, especially after Fiona spirals out of control. In the season finale, Debbie discovers Fiona has left her $50,000.

In season 10, Debbie rules the household with an iron fist following Fiona's departure. However, she has secretly been overspending on expensive clothing, which she wears several times before returning. She hides the clothes in a secret storage locker, which is later discovered by Frank and Mikey and cleaned out. Debbie meets old school friend Megan (Dylan Nicole Gelula), who she hasn't seen since she was "getting dragged out of D-Hall" at a grocery store. Megan introduces Debbie to ensnaring men into being baby daddies and then "milk him for everything you can get" for child support benefits. Megan takes Debbie to an upscale hotel to meet rich men but Debbie has second thoughts becoming attracted to Claudia Nicolo (Constance Zimmer), asking her to pretend to be her "mom's friend" to get away from the suitors. Debbie begins a relationship with Claudia, a successful businesswoman who initially assumes Debbie is a prostitute as she was in "ho corner" with Debbie even confused as to why Claudia is generously lavishing her, but ends up being hit on by Claudia's underage daughter Julia (Alison Jaye) who has a dysfunctional relationship with her mother but Debbie bluntly rejects Julia, who follows the GPS of her mother's vehicle that Debbie borrowed back to her house and blackmails her into being her prom date. Debbie then runs back and forth from the prom to a social dinner date with Claudia. Debbie gets caught when Claudia arrives at Julia's prom, forcing Julia to confess to Claudia, with them arguing intensely both outright forgetting about Debbie with her walking away. A jealous Claudia reports Debbie to the police, who she attempts to evade fleeing down the backyard lane when officers arrive and is put on the sex offenders registry.

In season 11, Debbie's legal trouble due to her arrest regarding Julia has her wearing an ankle monitor, then pursuing a romantic relationship with Mickey's cousin Sandy. Julia naively considers moving in with Debbie but Sandy gives Julia a sharp reality check by punching Julia in the face. However, after discovering that Sandy has a son that she abandoned, Debbie breaks up with her due to her own abandonment issues. At the same time, Lip decides to sell the house, leading to a fight with Lip and Debbie desperately searching for a new home while trying to fight Lip's plans. She later gets a dangerous new girlfriend, Heidi (Shakira Barrera), just released from prison and convinces Debbie to leave town with her and Franny to El Paso, Texas with her.

=== Carl Gallagher ===
Carl Gallagher
- Shameless (American TV series) character
- First appearance: "Pilot" (2011)
- Last appearance: "Father Frank, Full of Grace" (2021)
- Created by: Paul Abbott
- Portrayed by: Ethan Cutkosky

In-universe information
- Full name: Carl Francis Hashish Gallagher
- Occupation: Police officer (currently); Military cadet (formerly)
- Family: Frank Gallagher (father, deceased); Monica Gallagher (mother, deceased); Fiona Gallagher (sister/adopted mother); Lip Gallagher (brother); Debbie Gallagher (sister); Ian Gallagher (half-brother); Mickey Milkovich (brother-in-law); Liam Gallagher (brother); Sammi Slott (half-sister); Peggy Gallagher (paternal grandmother, deceased); Bill Darrgen (maternal grandfather); Two unnamed children (via Ingrid Jones); Possible (via Tish)
- Spouse: Kassidi Gallagher (wife)
- Significant others: Bonnie (ex-girlfriend); Dominique Winslow (ex-girlfriend); Kelly Keefe (ex-girlfriend); Tish (ex-fling)
- Relatives: Two unnamed children; Jerry Gallagher (uncle); Clayton Gallagher (uncle); Lucy Gallagher (aunt-by-marriage); Jacob Gallagher (cousin); Wyatt Gallagher (uncle); Franny Gallagher (niece); Freddie Gallagher (nephew); Chuckie Slott (nephew); Patrick Gallagher (cousin-once-removed); Ginger Gallagher (great aunt, deceased)
- Home: Chicago, Illinois

Carl Francis Hashish Gallagher (Ethan Cutkosky), aged 9–19, is the second-youngest Gallagher child. He initially shares a room with Lip and Ian, who try to keep their more adult interests from him. Carl is often in trouble at school for attacking other students. In his early years, he displays several psychopathic tendencies such as mutilating his toys and killing stray animals, although this behaviour seems to wane as he ages. He also displays concern for his father Frank and is one of the few children to call him Dad, although this loyalty weakens as Carl grows up and becomes more aware of Frank's deceptions.

In season 3, Carl bonds with Frank when the latter convinces him he has cancer for a scheme (although he is later "cured"). He is later placed in a foster home after Frank calls DCFS on the family, but returns once Fiona files for legal guardianship of her siblings. While bonding with Frank, he is nearly arrested for stealing from his former foster parents before Frank assumes full responsibility.

During season 4, when Frank is dying from liver failure, Carl takes it upon himself to find his father an organ donor and meets his half-sister Sammi, and her son. He later begins a whirlwind relationship of crime with a girl named Bonnie, and is devastated when she leaves. After Frank survives his liver transplant, he shares a beer and hug with Carl to thank him for his help in saving him.

In season 5, he has grown up more and begins selling drugs for a local gang which Fiona discourages and Frank encourages. Carl later uses his nephew Chuckie in his illicit schemes, but both are caught and sentenced to juvenile detention. Although Fiona begs Carl to betray his gang associates to receive a lesser sentence, Carl refuses as he wants the "street cred" juvie will give him. He is later accepted by the gang for his loyalty.

In season 6, he leaves juvie and immerses himself into gang culture. He begins selling firearms with his friend Nick. After someone steals his bike, Nick murders the kid and gets arrested. Carl is traumatized by this and decides to give up his criminal ways, starting with using the money he earned from dealing drugs and guns to help Fiona buy back the house when they get evicted. However, he is pistol whipped and threatened by his superiors when he refuses to do a drug run. Frank fills in for him but it is Sean who helps Carl get out of the drug business and gets him a job at Patsy's. Carl enters into a relationship with Dominique and loses his virginity to her. He later decides to be a cop after spending the day with her father. At the end of the season, he helps throw Frank off the bridge following Fiona's aborted wedding.

In season 7, he learns that Frank survived and cut ties with him. Later on, Dominique cheated on him when he tests negative for an STD she contracted, causing the two to break up. He eventually enrolls in military school with the help of Dominique's father. By the end, he came back for his mother's abrupt death and made amends with his father, while making a tribute to Monica.

During Season 8, Carl becomes much more responsible and mature thanks to his time in military school. He also begins a makeshift detox business in the family's basement, where he meets Kassidi, an impulsive, unpredictable rich girl who ran away from home. The two begin dating, and eventually marry. Eventually, Kassidi's clingy behavior becomes too much and Carl leaves her and returns to military school.

In season 9, Carl becomes a corporal cadet in military school. Kassidi followed him and set up camp outside the school gates, as a way to support him. Her presence proves to be an annoyance to Carl, and threatens his promotion. One of his cadets "takes care" of Kassidi (though it is never truly confirmed) in an attempt to gain Carl's approval. When Carl returns home, he plans on applying to West Point. He manages to get a recommendation letter from a senator with some help from V, and begins volunteering at Soothing Horizons, a business that euthanizes elderly and terminally ill dogs. However, he cannot bring himself to kill the dogs and takes them home to die peacefully in the basement. During a West Point aspirants' party, he meets Kelly, the daughter of a strict military man, and the two begin dating. Carl soon becomes jealous of Kelly's friendship with Debbie, fearing the two will fall in love. His paranoia causes Kelly to break up with him. He begins working at Captain Bob's, a seafood fast joint, to make money. His breakup with Kelly, as well as rejection from West Point, causes him to lose hope in his future and decide to not return to military school. He changes his mind after Kelly reveals she loves him, and the two reconcile.

In season 10, Carl graduates from military school and continues his relationship with Kelly. Eventually they break up after Kelly cheats on him while at the Naval Academy. Carl also get his job at Captain Bob's back and takes an interest in a new coworker. He helps her with a scam, in exchange for half profit. To Carl's shock, he learns he is the father to twins due to Frank using Carl's sperm to impregnate the former's ex-girlfriend.

In season 11, Carl becomes a police officer, but struggles with all of the issues he finds. His first partner refuses to leave the vehicle during the day despite witnessing several crimes in progress. His second partner is cruel and resentful of most of Chicago and threatens to cut off the hand of a young shoplifter. After arresting a rich man and refusing to apologize for it, Carl is demoted to meter maid where he finds joy in ticketing the rich and giving the poor a break. His former partner Arthur recommends that Carl be reinstated to full policing duties with the COVID-19 pandemic with Leesie Jane as his mentor and the two consider buying the Alibi together and turning it into a cop bar after Kev and V decide to sell it and move to Louisville, Kentucky.

=== Liam Gallagher ===
Liam Gallagher
- Shameless (American TV series) character
- First appearance: "Pilot" (2011)
- Created by: Paul Abbott

In-universe information
- Family: Frank Gallagher (father, deceased); Monica Gallagher (mother, deceased); Fiona Gallagher (sister/adopted mother); Lip Gallagher (brother); Debbie Gallagher (sister); Carl Gallagher (brother); Ian Gallagher (half-brother); Mickey Milkovich (brother-in-law); Sammi Slott (half-sister); Kassidi Gallagher (sister-in-law, deceased); Peggy Gallagher (paternal grandmother, deceased); Bill Durrgen (maternal grandfather)
- Relatives: Jerry Gallagher (uncle); Clayton Gallagher (uncle); Lucy Gallagher (aunt-by-marriage); Jacob Gallagher (cousin); Wyatt Gallagher (uncle); Franny Gallagher (niece); Freddie Gallagher (nephew); Chuckie Slott (nephew); Two unnamed nieces and nephews (via Carl); Patrick Gallagher (cousin-once-removed); Ginger Gallagher (great aunt, deceased)
- Home: Chicago, Illinois

Liam Fergus Beircheart Gallagher (Christian Isaiah, Brennan Kane Johnson & Blake Alexander Johnson, Brenden & Brandon Sims) aged 18 months to 11 over the span of the series, is the youngest of the Gallagher children. He appears African-American and was initially thought to be the result of his mother's supposed affair with an African-American sponsor, parole officer, or bouncer, though a DNA test reveals that he is Frank's son. It is suggested that this is because Frank's father may have been the result of his own mother's affair with a black man, with the genes passing onto Liam. Season 10 also revealed that Monica's grandfather was the one who had an affair with a black man.

During season 2, Liam is taken because of Frank's bad bet and the family amasses money to reclaim him.

In season 4, Liam ingests Fiona's cocaine and possibly suffers brain damage but recovers. Since Frank still had parental rights, he is needed to get Liam out of the hospital. Lip cares for him as he does not trust Fiona to do so, while Carl fights off bullies who tease Liam for potentially being intellectually disabled.

In season 5, he begins walking and talking.

In season 6, he moves in with Fiona and Sean when the family are kicked out of the house.

During season 7, he has grown considerably. He is shown to be the only Gallagher child who is still loyal to Frank after the rest turn against him. Frank "disowns" his other children and takes Liam with him. Despite warnings from his siblings of their father's habits, Frank treats Liam better than he did the rest of his children. When the family finds Frank started a homeless shelter, Frank turns all but Liam away since they are now against him. Liam soon starts school but finds it closed due to a lack of children because of gentrification. Frank later witnesses his son being bullied at a new school, though helps him gain admission to a fancy private school with paid tuition. Liam thanks his father by hugging him as he goes off, with a proud Frank looking on. Frank is allowed to take Liam to school, which is a steppingstone to his acceptance by the family. From his time with him, Liam starts to take more after his father. Near the end of the season, he reunites with his mother but doesn't recall her until she jogs his memory.

During season 8, he spends more time with his father, who decides to change his ways and sees Liam as his last chance to be a proper father to one of his children. Liam is shown to not mind Frank. Liam enjoys school, although his education is hindered by his school constantly taking him out of class to promote diversity, causing him to fall behind in his classes until Frank steps in and tells the school to stop taking Liam out of class and educate him, causing his grades to improve. Eventually, Frank hits rock bottom and Liam is now used as a lookout for Frank to steal from the rich parents but they still bond.

In season 9, Liam is expelled from his school as a result of Frank giving various STDs to the mothers of the school, who then passed it to their cheating husbands. Liam is sent to public school and is picked on for his upper-class education. However, he uses his new intellect to help a classmate with schoolwork for protection from a bully. Liam's intellect lets him be placed in sixth grade. Liam proves to be the most intelligent, emotionally stable, and mature out of his siblings, who all note he is the only one who is not self-destructive and does not possess any abandonment issues.

=== Frances "Franny" Gallagher ===
Frances "Franny" Harriet Gallagher is played by actress Paris Newton. She is Debbie's daughter, the niece of the other Gallaghers and the granddaughter of Frank and Monica. She was conceived in the middle of Season 5 and born towards the end of season 6. When her water broke, Debbie gave birth to her child on the kitchen table, whom she named Frances after her grandfather for his support. During season 7, she went by her middle name when Debbie and her siblings became estranged from Frank temporarily, as Debbie changed her name back after going to Frank for help. She meets her paternal relatives, who take her away from Debbie, though her maternal grandmother returns and takes her back after being excited at having a granddaughter. At a CPS meeting, Franny is returned to her mother while her paternal family is allowed visiting rights, although both families are warned to get along, lest they lose Franny to the system. Franny is often seen in the Gallagher household being tended to by her mother, aunt, and uncles. In season 9, Franny begins to talk and declares that she is a "good girl" to Debbie when she tries to convince her to misbehave as part of a scheme. In season 11, we see much more of this second generation Gallagher. We witness her fifth birthday party, in which Mickey surprises her with a gun, something Franny is much more interested in than a princess party. We also witness her first haircut, which was given to her by herself with scissors and super glue. Debbie has to figure how to fix it for the "Little Miss Southside" competition, and resolves it by covering her hair with a very large wig. In season 11, we also see Frank bonding with his granddaughter on the south side streets. To commemorate their day together, he gets a very large tattoo that says "I heart Franny" on his arm in a very touching bonding scene. Through this, we learn that Franny is not a girly girl, because she has mainly been tended to by her uncles while Debbie served time. She is also a big wrestling fan and gets to meet her idol Queen Justice in which Franny repeatedly says her tag line "You've been served!"

== Other Gallaghers ==
=== Margaret Gallagher ===
Margaret "Peggy" Deborah Gallagher (Louise Fletcher), also known as "Grammy", is the mother of Frank and his brothers and the Gallagher family matriarch. She is largely responsible for Frank's bad parenting due to her negligence and abuse towards him as a child. She ran numerous meth labs and was sent to prison after causing a meth lab explosion that killed two college students. She debuts in season 1 when she is visited by her grandsons Lip and Ian. Peggy is happy to meet them before they inquire about their uncles, as they learned that one of them is Ian's biological father. In season 2, she is sent home from prison on a medical furlough after lying about her health and moves in with Frank and his kids. She bonds with the younger Gallaghers. Peggy seeks retaliation on a retired meth dealer who profited from her arrest. Despite her hostile nature to Frank, she is proud of him when she learns of his scams and tries her best to reach out to the Gallagher children by giving Fiona money and showering Carl and Debbie with gifts. She ignores Frank's attempts to reconcile with her and continues to mistreat him, causing Frank to briefly contemplate killing his mother in her sleep but changes his mind. Frank continues to assist her in her deteriorating health while trying to find ways to get rid of her. At the end of season 2, she is kicked out of the house by Fiona after Carl causes an explosion in a meth lab she built in the basement. Peggy sends money to her other sons while leaving Frank with nothing before she allows Sheila to euthanize her by sitting on her face on a pillow. She is cremated and her ashes are sent to Frank.

=== Monica Gallagher ===
Monica Jean Gallagher (May 1, 1961 – December 18, 2016), portrayed by Chloe Webb, is Frank's ex-wife and the mother of the Gallagher children. Monica has bipolar disorder. Although she deeply loves her children and feels terrible for abandoning them, she can never sustain her love and concern for them for very long before succumbing to drugs, selfishness, and depression. The older Gallagher children resent and distrust her, but she is sometimes able to coax Debbie or Carl into spending time with her. In season 1, Frank tricks Monica into returning for financial gain. Monica announces she is bisexual and in a relationship with a woman named Roberta (also known as "Bob") and that the two plan to marry. Monica and Bob try to leave with Liam but a paternity test reveals that Frank is his father. Another test reveals that Ian is not Frank's biological son but rather the son of one of Frank's brothers from a drug fueled affair. Despite this, she still tries to leave with Liam but Fiona asks Monica to give him back and she complies. In season 2, Frank goes to Monica when his mother dies. Bob has left. At the end of the second season, Monica finds the Gallaghers' squirrel fund and convinces Frank to spend it with her. Her behavior becomes more and more manic, which worries her children. Later, in the middle of a depressive episode, Monica cuts her wrists on Thanksgiving. She is rushed to the hospital and admitted to the psychiatric ward. After a long discussion with Fiona, Frank takes Debbie and helps Monica escape the psych ward. She ends up leaving with her new girlfriend. Monica reappears in season 5 when she visits Ian in military prison. Ian, feeling betrayed by his siblings for their treatment of him following his bipolar diagnosis, and believing Monica to be the only one who is able to understand him, hitchhikes out of the city with her. Monica takes Ian to live with a boyfriend called Walter who makes methamphetamine; Ian leaves when he realizes Monica has not changed. In season 7, Monica returns to Chicago to try to make amends again. She helps Debbie regain custody of her daughter. She later tells Frank that she is dying and that she returned in order to leave something behind for the children. Monica and Frank renew their wedding vows. Monica dies the following morning from a massive cerebral hemorrhage. At her funeral, Monica's father appears and punches Frank for "ruining his daughter". Monica's stash of multiple pounds of meth—her inheritance to her children—is discovered in a storage locker. It is later revealed that she stole the drugs from an old boyfriend.

=== Jerry Gallagher ===
Jerry Gallagher (William H. Macy) is Frank's twin brother who is introduced in season 1. After visiting their grandmother Peggy, Ian and Lip learn his name and visit Jerry who owes money to her. Jerry is initially unaware of who they are, but immediately shuts the door in their faces when he learns they are Frank's children. Lip reveals they are trying to determine if he is Ian's biological father; however, Jerry forces them to leave at gunpoint. Before she dies, Peggy leaves an unknown amount of money to him.

=== Clayton Gallagher ===
Clayton Gallagher (Kristoffer Ryan Winters) is Frank's brother who is introduced in season 1. After Ian learns he is not Frank's biological child, he and Lip visit their grandmother Peggy to track down their uncles. Unlike Jerry, Clayton is friendly and shares family photos with them. Given their physical similarities, it is likely Clayton is Ian's biological father. Clayton mentions having a fallout with his brother and wanting to make amends. His wife notices the similarities between him and Ian, which causes a fight. Ian takes Lip outside and tells him that it does not matter to him who his biological father is—his real family is his siblings. Clayton overheard all of this and did not seem to protest Ian's choice. Clayton reappears in season 2, when Frank and Monica visit him to get the money that Peggy sent him and the other brother before her death. Clayton does not seem pleased to see his brother and tries to send him off, but Frank tries to guilt him into giving him some of the money left by Peggy. Clayton explains that he did not know she was released and spent the money to pay his mortgage. He resists Monica's advances and sends them off.

=== Wyatt Gallagher ===
Wyatt Gallagher is Frank's brother who is mentioned in season 1. Lip and Ian learn about him when they visit their grandmother Peggy in prison while searching for Ian's biological father. Peggy refers to him as her baby, implying he is the youngest. She later scratches him off as a candidate for Ian's father, stating his testicles were blasted off in the navy.

=== Ginger Gallagher ===
Ginger Gallagher is Frank's deceased aunt who is mentioned in season 1. As her last name was Gallagher, she was presumably the sister of Frank's father. She was revealed to have been the owner of the Gallagher house but died of a drug overdose twelve years prior to the start of the series. She was buried in the backyard by Frank, who uses her identity to claim her checks from the state. Frank is eventually forced to tell his kids the truth after the family is visited by social workers. Using a senile woman from a retirement home, the Gallaghers impersonate Ginger to claim the check and avoid being arrested for fraud. In season 2, Peggy learns of the scheme and compliments her son on impersonating Ginger, but told him that she would take over the scheme. In Season 3, the family digs up Ginger's body after they learn their backyard will be dug up by the city and give her a proper burial in a cemetery. When the Gallaghers try to file a fake will for Ginger, they learn their cousin, Patrick, had already filed a death certificate and will for her, making him the legal owner.

=== Patrick Gallagher ===
Patrick "Pit Bull" Gallagher (Brent Sexton) is Frank's cousin who is introduced in season 3. Due to his last name being Gallagher, he is the nephew of Frank's father from an unknown sibling. He antagonizes the family by claiming the Gallagher house by using a fake will of his late Aunt Ginger before the rest of the family could do so. Frank remarks Patrick was called Pit Bull as he never gives up. Carl tries to kill him by poison, but fails, which leads Patrick to threaten to have the family arrested for this; the police back off when Debbie claims Patrick molested her which results in his near arrest. The family offers to drop the charges if he agrees to let them stay in the house in exchange for rent. Reluctantly, he agrees to the terms. In season 6, he appears again and is not pleased to see his extended family. He reveals that because he failed to pay back a loan, the bank is going to repossess the house, leaving the Gallaghers homeless. The family buys back the house by using Carl's drug money.

=== Samantha Slott ===
Samantha "Sammi" Slott (Emily Bergl) is Frank's eldest daughter and the older half-sister of his other children. Her existence remains a secret until Frank begins dying of liver failure and searches for his daughter to get a liver transplant from her. She becomes a recurring character in season 4 and a regular character in season 5. Sammi was living in a trailer in a rundown neighborhood with her son, Charles, whom she calls Chuckie, when Frank sought her out. Sammi can be caring but can also be impulsive, violent, and promiscuous. Frank initially keeps their kinship a secret, leading Sammi to develop romantic feelings for him. However, when it is revealed she is not a match for his liver, Frank reveals the truth in a fit of anger. Sammi is initially enraged and disgusted at his deception, though she forgives him later and the two renew their relationship as father and daughter. Midway through the season, she meets her half-siblings. She bonds with Debbie and Carl by giving her younger sister advice on her period and helping her brother in caring for their father. Sammi moves in with the family after her trailer is confiscated. Frank lies to Sammi about getting her a new trailer and she becomes angry when she learns the truth, eventually shooting Frank in the arm when he refuses to leave. She uses this incident to threaten Frank into pretending to care for her. Frank gets payback by implicating Chuckie for Carl's heroin smuggling attempt. Sammi rats on Carl because he tricked Chuckie into helping him and none of the Gallaghers care that Chuckie is innocent, preferring to let him take the fall for Carl. Carl gets locked up for a year in juvenile detention. Carl threatens to hurt Chuckie in juvie, causing Sammi to beat him up. Fearing for her son's safety in juvie, she tattoos a swastika onto Chuckie's forehead so he will be accepted and protected by the Aryan Brotherhood. When the judge finds out he only has an IQ of 71, she gives him a reduced sentence of 120 days. Later on, Sammi calls military police on Ian as revenge. Mickey and Debbie try to get back at Sammi by drugging her, but Mickey thinks she died and they stuff her in a moving crate. However, Sammi comes back and tries to shoot Mickey. In season 6, Sammi is incarcerated for attempting to kill Mickey.

=== Charles Slott ===
Charles "Chuckie" Nevins Slott (Kellen Michael) is a recurring character in seasons 4–6. Chuckie is Sammi's son, making him the grandson of Frank and the nephew of the Gallagher children. He has an IQ of 71, making him borderline intellectually disabled. Chuckie is naïve to the intentions of others. He ends up in prison along with Carl for being a drug mule. He is later released and stays with the Gallaghers despite their previous tension with Sammi. Although Carl threatens to hurt Chuckie while the two are in juvenile detention, Carl does not follow through. Before leaving for juvie, his mother tattoos a swastika on his forehead to ensure that he is protected by neo-Nazis, causing his sentence to be extended for bad behavior. In season 6, he is suspended from school after writing a book report on Mein Kampf, having been brainwashed by the neo-Nazis while in juvie. The school threatens to expel him, but Frank fights for his freedom of speech, and Chuckie is allowed to read the essay in class, much to their horror. When the Gallaghers lose their home, they forget to inform Chuckie, who is left to camp under the porch alone until Frank arrives and keeps him company. Eventually, Sammi calls her mother Queenie to look after him, tattoos a chakra over the swastika, and takes him to live at her Eco Village. While there, he works tending to poppy plants and survives a mountain lion's attack after being physically scarred. Chuckie is presumed to be taken care by his grandmother when Frank and Debbie leave the commune.

=== Kassidi Gallagher ===
Kassidi Gallagher (Sammi Hanratty) is a recurring character in season 8. She is introduced as one of the addicts living in the Gallagher basement as part of Carl's makeshift detox business. She ran away from her wealthy family and convinces Carl to write her family a ransom note to help him make money. Carl gets the money from her father, who asks Carl to send her home. Carl tries to do so before Kassidi bribes him with oral sex, and the two begin dating. Kassidi soon becomes possessive, demanding, and slightly unhinged. She displays a morbid obsession with South Side life, even going so far as to pose with a corpse. Due to a misunderstanding with a promise ring, she believes Carl proposed to her and forbids him from leaving for military school unless he marries her. Carl agrees, and the two use fake IDs to get married. In the season 8 finale, she tries to prevent Carl from going to military school by handcuffing him to a bed. Carl breaks free and makes it on the bus with Kassidi watching, begging him not to go as he ignores her. She follows him to military school in season 9 and camps outside the school gates. Carl is annoyed by her presence as it jeopardizes his chances for a promotion. One of Carl's cadets "takes care" of Kassidi, implying that he had killed her.

=== Freddie Gallagher ===
Freddie Gallagher (Grayson Hill) is the newborn son of Lip and Tami. He is conceived in season 9, with Tami assuring Lip that he is the father. Tami initially had concerns about whether she should have the baby, although she eventually comes around. In season 10, Tami goes into labor and gives birth by way of a Caesarean section. Tami goes into critical condition and is rushed to surgery, while the Gallagher family and friends gather to celebrate the birth of her son. Lip initially struggles to adapt to fatherhood but is supported and encouraged by his family. Freddie is named after Lip's late mentor, Clyde Frederick Youens.

== Other main characters ==
=== Jimmy Lishman ===
Jimmy Lishman (Justin Chatwin) is a main character in seasons 1–3, a guest star in season 4 and a recurring character in season 5. He is also known as Steve Wilton and Jack. Jimmy is a young man who courts Fiona, going to great lengths to win her over because she is his "dream girl". He buys the Gallaghers expensive possessions and spends money liberally for them. Fiona finds this off-putting until she discovers that he is a professional car thief. He later reveals that his real name is Jimmy and that he comes from a wealthy family who presumes he is in medical school.

In season 2, he returns to Chicago after fleeing the United States to escape arrest. Fiona learns he married Estefania, the daughter of Nando, a Brazilian mafia mob leader, as a green card marriage to pay off a debt Jimmy owed Nando. He threatens to kill Jimmy if the latter does not play the part of devoted husband for Immigration Services. He tries to warm his way back to Fiona, while letting Lip live with him when she kicks him out. Jimmy and Fiona resume their relationship at the end of season 2, although he keeps his continued involvement with Estefania.

In season 3, Jimmy now living with the Gallaghers struggles to find balance between Fiona and Estefania. He stops stealing cars as he knows it will get him in trouble with Estefania's father, so he works various odd jobs, eventually deciding to finish med school. When Jimmy does not answer a phone call, Estefania faces immigration officers on her own and is deported after she cannot prove the marriage is real. Nando then takes Jimmy on a boat, presumably to murder him, leaving Fiona to believe he abandoned her when he doesn't answer her call. In a post-credit scene in the season 4 finale, he is revealed to still be alive and started going by "Jack".

In season 5, Fiona encounters Jimmy at her diner job. Although she is angry at him for leaving her, he reveals he was sold into indentured servitude by Endo and had to work a whole year to buy his way out. She sleeps with him and cheats on her husband, Gus. Fiona later confesses to Gus, and all three agree to meet at the diner to discuss the affair. Gus immediately punches Jimmy in the face. Fiona talks to Jimmy and he offers to whisk her away to Dubai, but she decides it is better to end their relationship as she is still unsure of his true identity. Jimmy's business partner Angela tells Fiona that their deal in Dubai had been cancelled earlier that day.

In the series finale, Jimmy briefly reappears in a flashback to a dinner that he had attended with the Gallaghers as a dying Frank's life flashes before his eyes.

=== Veronica Fisher ===
Veronica "V" Fisher (Shanola Hampton) is the Gallaghers' neighbor and Fiona's best friend and confidante. She often gives Fiona advice concerning relationships, caring for her siblings, and caring for herself. Veronica pursued a hospital medical career until she was fired for stealing medical supplies, and works at a nursing home at the beginning of the series, while moonlighting as a cam girl. In season 1, she and Kevin get married, although the marriage is not valid since Kev is still legally married to his first wife.

In season 3, Vee and Kev are heartbroken to learn they are unable to conceive. Veronica's mother Carol offers to act as a surrogate. However, Vee finds herself miraculously pregnant with triplets (one of which is non-viable), and she gives birth to twin girls. When Carol wishes to keep her baby, Vee and Kev agree, unable to financially support three children. In season 5, Veronica struggles to adjust to motherhood and is jealous that Kevin pays more attention to their daughters than her, resulting in the two becoming temporarily separated. During this time, she contacts an old high school acquaintance and agrees to go out on a date with him, though she is unable to commit to him. She and Kev eventually reconcile. In season 6, Vee marries Svetlana to prevent her from being deported, and their friendship evolves into something more. Vee's attraction to Svetlana initially causes tension between her and Kev, but the three eventually work out a solution, and by season 7, they are in a polyamorous relationship and raising their children together. They attempt to adopt each other's children, only for Kev and Vee to find out they signed ownership of the Alibi over to Svetlana. Kev and Vee end their relationship with Svetlana.

In season 8, Vee takes revenge on Svetlana by having her arrested by immigration. She makes a deal with her to reclaim part of the bar in exchange for getting out of jail. She fails to resist Svetlana's seductions, much to her annoyance. Thanks to Fiona, Vee realizes that her attraction to Svetlana stems from a desire to be dominated, which allows her to break free from Svetlana's control. She and Kev get rid of Svetlana by getting her married to a wealthy, senile man.

In season 9, she juggles between motherhood and running the Alibi. She continues to help the Gallaghers, including getting a letter of recommendation from a congressman for Carl. She and Kev try to find a nursery school for their two girls, but because there is only one spot available, they have the girls impersonate one another. When Kev proposes that they have another child, Vee refuses. She gives in and agrees to adopt a child, while ordering Kev to get a vasectomy.

=== Kevin Ball ===
Kevin "Kev" Ball (Steve Howey) is Veronica's husband. He is separated from his first wife, whom he left after she abused him. Kev is the owner of the Alibi Room and is the Gallaghers' neighbor and friend. Though frequently annoyed by Frank's lifestyle, he gives Frank drinks on credit at his bar and cashes his disability checks for him.

Kev is dyslexic and grew up in foster care. When Kev and Veronica take in a girl named Ethel, Kev takes it upon himself to make her feel as comfortable as possible; she runs away and leaves them devastated. Kev inherits the Alibi from its previous owner, Stan. To keep his bar afloat, Kev partners with Mickey and runs a brothel from the apartment above the bar.

In season 5, Kev takes to parenthood easily to V's annoyance. His devotion to his daughters and his inattentiveness to V results in the two of them being briefly separated. During this time, Kev lives in Lip's dorm and sleeps with multiple college students. He ultimately realizes how much he cares for V and the two reconcile.

By season 7, Kev is in a polyamorous relationship with Svetlana and Veronica. Tensions arise when Kev fears V loves Svetlana more than him; the three of them attend couples' counseling to resolve these issues. He and Veronica are betrayed when they learn Svetlana tricked them into signing ownership of the Alibi over to her. Refusing to work for Svetlana, Kev takes a job bartending at a gay nightclub. Kev and V rid themselves of Svetlana and resume ownership of the bar.

During season 8, he has a brief health scare, which leads to him getting genetic testing, which reveals the location of his biological family. He, V, and their daughters travel to Kentucky to meet his family, who reveal that his birth name is Bart. Although Kev is initially overjoyed to finally have a family, he is heartbroken when he learns he was intentionally abandoned at a gas station as his family was unable to care for him. He forgives them when they reveal that he is the only successful member of the family.

In season 9, when an online critic rates the Alibi the "rapiest" bar on the South Side, Kev takes it upon himself to make the bar safe for women. He later tries to convince V to have another child; she refuses, and demands that he get a vasectomy. She finally agrees to adopt a child, and they eventually take in Santiago, a Guatemalan immigrant. Kev is ecstatic to finally have a son, but is heartbroken when Santiago returns to Guatemala to be with his family.

At the end of season 10, he proposes to Veronica, which she accepts. They get married in season 11 and decide to sell the Alibi and move to Louisville, Kentucky where V's mom is moving to.

=== Sheila Jackson ===
Sheila Jackson (Joan Cusack) is a regular character from seasons 1–4, and for the first three episodes of season 5. She is Karen's mother, Eddie's widow, and an on and off love interest to Frank. Sheila is a kind and caring person, if a bit empty-headed. She has agoraphobia and a fear of germs that developed when Karen was young. Although she appears to be a seemingly mild mannered housewife, she reveals to Frank that she is secretly very sexually dominant and owns a vast collection of sex toys, which surprises Frank after he attempts to seduce Sheila in order to take advantage of her disability. Sheila eventually overcomes her agoraphobia and continues to spend a great deal of her time with Frank.

Toward the end of Season 2, Sheila meets Frank's mother Peggy, and the two initially despise each other. Peggy is then diagnosed with terminal cancer, and moves into Sheila's home after starting a fire in the Gallagher's basement from a meth lab. Sheila quickly develops sympathy for Peggy after seeing her struggle with her illness. Peggy convinces Sheila to euthanize her. After Karen gives birth, Karen does not want the baby, nor do the adoptive parents after learning the baby has Down syndrome, and Sheila steals the baby from the hospital. When Karen forces her to choose between her or the baby, Sheila chooses the baby, whom she names Hyram ("Hymie") after her father.

By season 3, Sheila starts a relationship with Jody and the two of them raise Hymie together. Sheila is dissatisfied by their vanilla sexual relationship and convinces Jody to use sex toys, which causes his sex addiction to relapse much to Sheila's dismay. When Karen has an accident, Sheila breaks things off with Jody and encourages him to take care of Karen and Hymie, and the three head west for treatment.

In season 4, Sheila starts internet dating. She meets a Native American man with five nieces and nephews, whom he leaves with her after he flees for tax evasion. She wants to adopt the children but is required to be married, so she marries Frank while he is unconscious in the hospital. Her request for adoption is denied and they're sent to live with their great grandfather.

In season 5, Sheila becomes eager to explore the country, so she sells her house and uses the money to buy an RV hoping Frank will come with her. However, after Frank lashes out at her for all her faults and the distillery he built in her basement accidentally blows up her house, she leaves Chicago behind and takes off in her new RV to never be heard from again.

=== Karen Jackson ===
Karen Jackson (Laura Slade Wiggins) is a regular character in seasons 1 and 2 and a recurring character in season 3. Karen is the daughter of Sheila and Eddie Jackson. Her mother has severe agoraphobia that developed when Karen was a child, leaving her unable to leave their home. Her father is overtly religious and emotionally absent, leaving Karen to raise herself and support Sheila’s struggles with mental illness. Her parents' not being present during her childhood led to Karen becoming self-destructive and engaging in a reckless promiscuous lifestyle. A complex character, Karen evolves from a supporting role in the first season to a gradually more manipulative, antagonistic role in the second and third seasons.

In the first season, Karen becomes close to Lip after he tutors her and she performs oral sex on him. While she is initially interested in the prospect of a relationship with him, he states he is content with them being friends with benefits. After her father discovers she is sexually active, their relationship becomes strained. Frank eventually becomes romantically involved with Sheila and moves into their house. Eddie bribes Karen with the offer of gifting her his car if she attends a purity ball at his church with him. On the night of the ball, she is told to confess her entire sexual past. Karen does this in detail, and Eddie humiliates her by calling her a whore, making her realize his love for her is conditional. Emotionally broken, Karen becomes distant from Lip and begins posting vlogs on her video blog Daddyz Girl. To get revenge against her father, she records herself raping Frank, who is inebriated from an Oxy, and sends it to Eddie and his coworkers, leading to him committing suicide. After Lip discovers the video, he is angry at her, although he forgives her.

In season 2, she attends Sex Addicts Anonymous and begins dating Jody, a 38-year-old addict in the program, although she continually cheats on him with Lip. Lip, now realizing he wants to be exclusive with Karen, attempts to ruin her relationship with Jody. Karen tells him to stay away from her after he sends Mandy to seduce Jody while she’s not home, which fails. Karen and Jody eventually marry, despite her still being a teenager, and she becomes pregnant. Karen, realizing she is disgusted by Jody, breaks up with him. Lip believes he is the father of Karen’s baby and goes with her to various adoption agencies. At the end of the season, Karen gives birth to a baby with Down syndrome. The baby is Asian, indicating that neither Lip nor Jody is the father. The couple who planned to adopt the baby backed out because of his genetic condition. Despite Karen having no intention of keeping him throughout her entire pregnancy and having no maternal attachment to him, Sheila insists on raising him and naming him Hymie. When Sheila refuses to send the baby away, Karen runs away.

In season 3, Karen returns in a recurring role in later episodes. Hymie's paternal grandmother shows up and takes the baby. Karen returns to live with Sheila and makes amends with her. Karen attempts to rekindle her relationship with Lip, who has since moved on with Mandy. As Lip did to Karen during her relationship with Jody, she attempts to ruin their relationship. While he initially rejects her, Lip cheats on Mandy multiple times. After Sheila discovers that Karen called Hymie’s paternal relatives and convinced them that Sheila was not capable of raising him, their relationship becomes strained. After Lip chooses Mandy, Karen calls her and taunts her. Sheila apologizes for not being able to be a present parent during her childhood and having sex with her husband, which brings Karen some solace. A jealous Mandy runs her over and leaves her for dead. Having survived, Karen is revealed to have frontal-lobe brain damage with anterograde amnesia, in which she is unable to form new memories. While it is possible for her condition to improve, she is left with an innocent childlike persona. After realizing that Mandy is responsible, a guilt-ridden Lip visits Karen and attempts to communicate with her. Despite pre-injury Karen not wanting a relationship with Jody or her baby, Sheila allows Jody to take both of them to Arizona to be with faith healers to tend her condition. They are briefly mentioned by Sheila in season 5.

Karen appears in a total of 30 episodes.

=== Mickey Milkovich ===
Mikhailo Aleksandr "Mickey" Milkovich (Noel Fisher), aged 25, is a recurring character in season 1, 2 and 7, a regular character in season 3–5 and 10–11, and a guest character in season 6 and 9. Mickey is Mandy's older brother. He is aggressively antisocial and carries firearms illegally. Mickey has a very long prison record, just like his father, Terry.

Mickey and Ian start on bad terms after Ian rejects Mandy's advances. Mandy lies to Mickey and says that Ian sexually abused her, prompting him and his brothers to go after Ian. He later steals food from Kash's store; Linda gives Ian a handgun to scare him away. Ian later goes to the Milkovich house to confront Mickey after he steals Kash's gun, and the two engage in sex after Ian attempts to get Kash's gun back. He is later shot in the leg by Kash after he catches him and Ian having sex and is sent to juvenile hall for the thefts.

In season 2, Mickey is released from juvie and has sex with Ian at a baseball field to celebrate. Ian becomes frustrated when Mickey has sex with women. Frank eventually sees Mickey and Ian having sex at the Kash and Grab; Mickey is afraid Frank will expose him and plans to attack him, but refrains for Ian's sake. He throws his gun away and punches an officer instead, landing him in juvenile hall again.

In season 3, Mickey is let out for overcrowding and continues his relationship with Ian. Ian manages to get him a job at the Kash and Grab and after seeing Ian's boyfriend becomes jealous and beats him up. Mickey suggests Ian stay at his house for the night instead of going back to foster care. Terry comes home to find Mickey and Ian having sex and assaults both of them. He has Svetlana, a Russian prostitute, rape Mickey to "fuck the faggot out of [him]". Svetlana becomes pregnant and Terry forces Mickey to marry her. Mickey is heartbroken when Ian leaves to join the army.

In season 4, Mickey becomes a pimp with Russian prostitutes and persuades Kev to allow him to use the upper floors of the Alibi Room. Ian is now working in a strip club where Mickey finds him. At his son Yevgeny's christening party at The Alibi Room, Mickey comes out to salvage his relationship with Ian. Mickey, Ian, and Terry fight, resulting in Terry's incarceration. At the end of season 4, Mickey notices that Ian is depressed and asks Debbie and Carl for help. Debbie tries to talk to Ian and quickly identifies the symptoms. Fiona thinks he may have bipolar disorder, like their mother, and suggests that he should be hospitalized. Mickey strongly disagrees and says he will take care of Ian himself.

In season 5, Ian cheats on Mickey twice. Mickey and Ian make a plan to destroy a homophobic church. Ian's mania increases as he shoots a porno and runs away with Yevgeny. After Ian is hospitalized, he and Mickey reunite. They get into a fight because Ian does not like Mickey nursing him and accuses him of going soft; they make up immediately as Ian says the fight is the first time he has felt something since he started taking his medication. As they go home, Sammi notifies the army's MPs of Ian's whereabouts and Ian is arrested. Mickey and Debbie take revenge by "roofie"-ing Sammi, who they thought had died as a result. In the season finale, Ian breaks up with Mickey after admitting he no longer wants to take his medication; Mickey is heartbroken but has to run away as Sammi appears and starts shooting at him.

In season 6, he is incarcerated once again and appears only in the first episode. When Ian comes to visit him, Mickey asks if he will wait for him. Ian appears to be uninterested and Mickey asks him to lie if he has to. Ian promises to wait.

In season 7, Mickey escapes prison while serving a fifteen-year sentence. He returns to Chicago and through proxies sees Ian to let him know that he is going to go to Mexico. Ian, despite having started a new relationship with Trevor, goes with Mickey to the Mexican border in Texas. At the last moment, Ian realizes that he is not the person he used to be, and that he cannot be with Mickey despite loving him. Upset, Mickey says goodbye and crosses the border while dressed up in drag.

In season 9, Ian is sent to prison for two years and discovers that Mickey is his new cellmate. Mickey explains that in exchange for turning on the Mexican cartel he was working for, Mickey was allowed to choose which prison he would serve his time in. Ian and Mickey begin kissing and resume their relationship.

In season 10, the two remain in a relationship while in prison, but often argue about their differing views on their situation. When Ian tries to sabotage his parole meeting, Mickey stops him and having been advised by older prisoners to let Ian go, tells him they will find a way to make it work. He tries to escape but is caught by guards. Mickey is told by the warden because of his work as an informant he was scheduled for early release but is warned that the cartel are looking for him. Mickey makes it to the Gallagher house, reunites with Ian, and moves in with him. Ian and Mickey get into a dangerous scam by their parole officer Paula (Rachel Dratch), who gets murdered by defenestration, with Ian and Mickey suspecting that the other one is Paula's murderer and Ian wants to marry Mickey for the purpose of not being able to testify against each other. When they know that the other is innocent, Ian backs out of the marriage, and Mickey punches Ian in retaliation. Ian, with the advice of his family, goes and buys Mickey a promise ring and gives it to him, which he refuses and tells Ian to call him when he gets over his feelings of self-worthlessness. In "Now Leaving Illinois," things between Ian and Mickey become strained when Mickey has a new boyfriend, Byron. Ian beats Byron up after he overhears the latter badmouthing Mickey. Ian proposes to Mickey on the spot who interrupts his speech and they get engaged.

In "Gallavich!," Ian and Mickey attempt to get married; it is implied that Mickey committed several armed robberies to earn the money for the wedding. Their plans are interrupted when Terry burns down their wedding venue. Ian's friends and family come together to plan a new ceremony on short notice at a polka hall owned by one of Frank's ex-lovers. Though Terry again tries to interrupt, Ian's former Gay Jesus followers step in to keep Terry from succeeding. Ian and Mickey drive off for their honeymoon. Terry follows them and shoots up their honeymoon suite, although neither Ian or Mickey are hurt.

In season 11, Mickey and Ian struggle to adapt to a married life during the COVID-19 pandemic and Mickey's family moving in next door. After Terry is accidentally shot and paralyzed by Liam, Mickey and Terry make some amends shortly before Terry is murdered by a nun that was hired to be his caretaker. Mickey is shown to be struggling with his father's death despite their antagonistic relationship and learns more about Terry's past with Ian's help. After Lip decides to sell the Gallagher house, Ian and Mickey move to the West Side of Chicago where Mickey has trouble adjusting to the changes.

=== Mandy Milkovich ===
Mandy Milkovich (Jane Levy season 1, Emma Greenwell season 2–6) is a recurring character in season 1, 2 and 5, a regular character in seasons 3 and 4, and a guest character in season 6. Mandy is Mickey's sister and has a reputation at school for her sexuality. She originally wanted to date Ian but was humiliated when he rebuffed her advances. She sent her brothers to beat him up but he confessed to her that he is actually gay. She offers to be his beard and they become close friends.

In season 2 she starts dating and sleeping with Lip. Mandy was raped and impregnated by her intoxicated father, who had mistaken her for her dead mother. She aborted it in "A Great Cause". In season 3 she moves in with the Gallaghers when her father mixes drugs and alcohol, to Fiona's chagrin. While living with the Gallaghers, Mandy and Lip frequently have sex. Though their romantic life is passionate, Lip starts to feel that Mandy is too clingy and wife-like and says their relationship was never "official".

Mandy loves Lip and secretly sends his applications to colleges when she sees he is wasting his potential. After she tells him he should be grateful for how hard she worked to get him into universities, he ends his affair with Karen. Mandy objects to Karen's advances on Lip and injures her with her car. Lip confronts Mandy and they break up. Lip thanks Mandy for all she has done before he leaves for college. She finds a new boyfriend and tells Lip about it before a drunk Ian reveals he's been sleeping with Mickey.

In season 4, Mandy's live-in boyfriend is Kenyatta. He physically abuses Mandy and Ian tries to help her. At the end of season 4, Mandy works as a waitress at the Waffle Cottage. Lip is served by Mandy and suspects something is wrong but she won't talk to him about anything other than the menu items.

In season 5, in contrast to her previously moody behavior, Mandy is dressed demurely and is good natured. In episode 3, Mandy considers leaving for Indiana with Kenyatta to "clean port-a-potties". Ian and Lip try to convince her not to go. During sex, Lip tells Mandy she is "gorgeous, sweet, funny, very smart, and a good person". She admits to Lip that she loves him but he is unable to say it back, so she goes with Kenyatta.

In season 6, it is revealed that she left Kenyatta and works as an escort. She enjoys her profession as her clients treat her well. She calls Ian for help when a client dies during an appointment and almost manages to avoid Lip before she leaves again.

=== Molly Milkovich ===
Molly Milkovich (Madison Rothschild) is a guest character that appeared in episodes 4 and 5 of season 3, the son of Terry and of an unnamed woman, raised to be a girl. Molly calls Terry claiming that her mother has died, so Lip and Mandy come by with Molly claiming no other contacts. She starts to befriend Debbie and when they change together, Debbie realises Molly is a boy with Molly claiming it's; "my girl penis", forcing Fiona to confront Molly explaining, "You're not a girl, honey. You're a boy who was raised by a jacked up meth head of a mom, who made you think you are a girl, because she hates men", actually shocking Molly. When the Gallagher children are taken into foster care, Molly unexplainedly disappears with Mandy telling Lip that Molly's mother had turned up. A deleted scene with Molly's mom implies that Molly was abused as she is scared to go with her. In later seasons, Mandy reveals that Molly’s mom was arrested for child abuse, and that Molly is living with their aunt.

=== Jody Silverman ===
Jody Silverman (Zach McGowan) is a recurring character in season 2 and a regular character in season 3. He meets Karen at Sex Addicts Anonymous and marries her later. Jody is good-natured but absent-minded. He is a keen tattoo artist and is often looking for work. Jody adores Sheila and calls her "Mom". Through the middle of season 2 Jody begins a romantic and sexual relationship with Sheila that he ends after Sheila urges him that he is right for Karen. He leaves Chicago with Karen to go to Arizona.

=== Mike Pratt ===
Mike Pratt (Jake McDorman) is a recurring character in season 3 and a regular character in season 4. Mike is a responsible and good-natured yuppie. He is Fiona's corporate boss and in season 4, becomes her boyfriend. The two hit it off well, until Fiona lies about an incident involving the company car. Mike then tells Fiona he values honesty and trust in a relationship. He soon learns that Fiona cheats on him with his brother Robbie. Although hurt by Fiona's betrayal, he does not fire her and bails Fiona out of prison, but makes it clear that he never wants to see her again. At the end of season 4, Fiona is having a hard time finding a job because of her felony conviction. She asks Mike's sister to lie and say that she was not fired because of her drug and child neglect arrest but because of downsizing. Mike's sister berates Fiona for taking advantage of someone as nice as Mike, asking the company to lie to the federal government for her and causing a rift in their family.

=== Svetlana Yevgenivna ===
Svetlana "Suka" Yevgenivna (Isidora Goreshter) is a Russian prostitute hired by Terry to have sex with Mickey to "cure" his homosexuality. She becomes pregnant and claims the father is Mickey. In season 4, Svetlana lives with other prostitutes in the Milkovich house. She threatens Ian when he returns because she fears he will distract Mickey from his duties as her child's father. After her son's birth, Svetlana threatens to tell Terry that Mickey and Ian's relationship continues and demands Mickey give her money to keep quiet. In season 5, Svetlana is a softer and more comical character. She becomes a step mother to the twins. She moves in with the Fisher/Balls and performs oral sex on them both as part of her "wifely" duties. In season 6 she regularly visits Mickey in prison and works as a bartender at The Alibi. When Kev accidentally reveals Svetlana came to America illegally to Immigration, V and Svetlana pretend to be married to keep her here, but fall in love in the process. In season 7, she lives with Kev and V in a polyamorous relationship. Her father (later revealed to be her husband) comes to America and stays with the family until Svetlana "gets rid of him". She later takes ownership of the Alibi behind their backs, to bring them out of debt, but ruins the relationship. She is later married off to a senile wealthy man.

=== Ford Kellogg ===
Ford Kellogg (Richard Flood) is a recurring character in season 8 and a regular character in season 9. He is one of Fiona's boyfriends. He is revealed to have a ex-wife and son in season 9, but claims that he and his wife are separated and getting a divorce and are only keeping up appearances for the sake of their son. The Gallaghers and Fiona take their revenge on him.

=== Tami Tamietti ===
Tami Tamietti (Kate Miner) is the sister of Brad's wife Camile. She meets Lip at Brad's wedding and they have a sexual encounter. When Lip asks her out on a date, she rejects him and treats him with hostility. She reappears at the baptism of Brad's baby and at first treats Lip badly but then invites him to eat and they start a relationship. Tami becomes pregnant by Lip and decides to have the baby. At the end of series it was revealed Tami was pregnant with baby number two.

== Recurring cast ==
=== Tommy ===
Tommy (Michael Patrick McGill) is a heavyset, cheery regular at The Alibi Room (a drunk). He is an acquaintance of Frank's. He is divorced and has many children. He often proudly expresses his conservative views and is shown to be somewhat misogynistic. He works as a construction crew manager and takes Lip on as a summer temporary employee.

=== Kash ===
Kash (Pej Vahdat) is the owner of the grocery store Kash and Grab, where Ian works. He has an affair with Ian despite being Muslim, married with children and Ian being underage. When his wife Linda learns of his sexuality, she allows it as long as he gives her another child. Kash is unable to stand up to Mickey who constantly steals from the store. When Linda becomes pregnant, he tries to restart his affair with Ian and is shocked to find him with Mickey. Kash shoots Mickey in the leg. Kash continues to feel trapped in his marriage and has an affair with an unknown Muslim man. He eventually leaves his family without a word.

=== Tony Markovich ===
Tony Markovich (Tyler Jacob Moore) is a police officer and the Gallaghers' neighbor who lives with his overbearing mother. Tony courts Fiona and learns of the Gallaghers' illegal activities. In Season 1 while angry at Jimmy/Steve, Fiona sleeps with Tony. The next day, Tony tells Fiona she took his virginity, and becomes clingy. When he learns that Jimmy/Steve is stealing cars, he gives him the choice of turning himself in or leaving town. Steve then leaves Tony the house he bought next door to the Gallaghers in an attempt to get Fiona to flee with him. He tried to get back with Fiona on multiple occasions in season 1–2, but failed to do so. During Seasons 2 and 3, Tony becomes more accepting that he is not Fiona's type. In Season 6, Tony facetiously identifies as gay to a confused Ian, claiming that it is a consequence of his failed relationship with Fiona.

=== Eddie Jackson ===
Eddie Jackson (Joel Murray) is a season 1 character. He is Sheila's husband and Karen's father. He is religious and has an obsession with clowns, and is stuck in an unhappy marriage. He catches Karen giving oral sex to Ian and becomes enraged. At first he takes his anger out on Frank, but then buys him a drink and explains he believes it is his own fault for Karen's behavior and that he is unhappy with his marriage to Sheila. He bribes Karen into attending a Purity Ball in exchange for his car. While at the ball, he breaks down when he learns of Karen's promiscuity and calls her a whore, publicly humiliating Karen. Sheila becomes furious and kicks him out of the house. After discovering a public video of Karen having sex with an intoxicated Frank, he becomes humiliated and commits suicide, believing he failed as a father.

=== Linda ===
Linda (Marguerite Moreau) is Kash's wife, a business-minded busybody. She is a Muslim convert and a proud mother but treats everything like a business, including her marriage. When Linda discovers her husband and Ian were having an affair, she accepts it but only on the basis he gives her another child and he does not touch Ian until she is pregnant. She becomes pregnant but Kash leaves. In a deleted scene, Linda finds out about Kash leaving and cries.

=== Kermit ===
Kermit (Jim Hoffmaster) is one of Frank's acquaintances at The Alibi Room. Despite saying he hates Frank, he often listens to Frank's rants and stories along with his other friend Tommy. Sometimes he sees Frank as a friend. He is quick to defend his name when people compare it to Kermit the Frog. He mentions having a sister who suffers from gout and mother who live elsewhere. He reveals in Season 9 that he is a Type 1 diabetic, when he asks Frank to buy him Canadian insulin. Kermit has an extensive collection of firearms. His motto is, "Prepare and prevent, not repair and repent."

=== Kate ===
Kate (Kerry O'Malley) is a fiery redhead. She works with Kev as manager of The Alibi Room. When Kev inherits the bar, she tells him that the bar is not profitable. Kate witnesses Frank calling Children's Services on his family and says "That is a whole new low even for you, Frank." Frank often reminds her that they have slept together during his comebacks.

=== Terry Milkovich ===
Terry Milkovich (Dennis Cockrum) is Mandy and Mickey's father. Because he has evaded arrest numerous times, Frank turns to him for an alibi. After Mandy gets pregnant, he initially hunts down Ian, believing he is the father due to Mandy posing as his girlfriend to cover his homosexuality. When he catches Ian and Lip invading his home, Mandy reveals that Terry is the one who got her pregnant. She tells Ian this is due to Terry getting drunk and blacking out, mistaking Mandy for her mother. He is very homophobic, and when he sees Ian and Mickey having sex, he beats them. He then hires Svetlana to "fuck the faggot" out of Mickey and forces him to marry her after Svetlana becomes pregnant with Yevgeny. When Mickey comes out as gay at Yevgeny's christening, Terry and his brothers get into a massive fight with Ian and Mickey. The fight breaks Terry's probation and he is imprisoned while Mickey taunts him relentlessly.

In season 9, he is released from prison and called on by Frank who enlists his aid in getting Mo White elected as congressman. Ian later goes to visit him; unlike before Terry bears no ill will towards him and tells him that Mickey is in Mexico. He also gives Ian some advice about prison.

He appears in season 10 to give advice to Mickey after his parole officer is killed. He begrudgingly comes to terms with his son's sexuality. When Ian and Mickey get engaged, Terry goes ballistic and attempts to prevent the wedding by burning down the venue. When that fails, Terry tries to interrupt the reception with a gun, but Ian's old Gay Jesus followers form a human blockade to prevent Terry from getting in. Terry later shoots up Ian and Mickey's honeymoon suite, though neither are harmed.

In season 11, Terry moves in next door to the Gallaghers and continues to maintain an adversarial, although no longer homicidal, relationship with the family. While shooting a gun Carl gave him into the air, Liam accidentally shoots and paralyzes Terry, who becomes a quadriplegic wheelchair user as a result. Despite their differences, Mickey helps to take care of his father after the shooting while the rest of his family abandons Terry. Eventually, Mickey and Ian attempt to hire a nurse to take care of Terry, but he scares them all away. Terry and Mickey reconcile somewhat before Ian finds a former nun as a nurse. However, the nun proves to be homicidal and suffocates Terry to death with a plastic bag for being an evil man.

In the aftermath of Terry's murder, the Milkoviches move away and Mickey experiences mixed feelings about his father's death. Mickey implies that he doesn't know who his mother is. Mickey and Ian track down Terry's first love Rachel who reveals that Terry wasn't always such a bad person, having once had a great sense of humor and gone so far as to try to convert to Judaism in order to marry Rachel. When he couldn't master Hebrew, Rachel's father refused and Terry murdered him, although the cops could never prove it. Rachel broke up with Terry and married a black man which is most likely the source of Terry's bigotry. After failing to recover Terry's body in time, Ian and Mickey learn that he has been taken to a mass grave for poor people. Locating his body in the cemetery, Ian and Mickey burn it with gasoline and sing part of "I Will Survive" which they know that Terry would've enjoyed.

=== Carol Fisher ===
Carol Fisher (Vanessa Bell Calloway) is Veronica's mother. She is the owner of a beauty salon. Carol acts as Veronica and Kevin's traditional surrogate. While initially skeptical of the idea, due to her age, she agrees to the request and has Kevin's sperm inseminated into her. When it does not work Veronica suggests that Kevin and Carol actually have sex, something they do not find enjoyable. Miraculously, Kevin and Carol successfully conceive and she gives birth to their baby. After giving birth, Carol wishes to raise Dominic and Veronica allows her.

In season 11, Carol decides to move to Louisville, Kentucky with Dominic and V tries and fails to persuade her to change her mind. After seeing Louisville for themselves, Kev and V ultimately decide to sell the Alibi and move in next door to Carol.

=== Jasmine Hollander ===
Jasmine Hollander (Amy Smart) is a married mother of three with a free-spirited approach to parenting. Jasmine is Fiona's friend and tries to help by inviting her to parties and setting her up with different men. After Fiona explains her complications with Jimmy, Jasmine tries to get romantic with Fiona, only for Fiona to leave awkwardly. Jasmine cheats on her husband and is kicked out by him. She then attempts to stay at the Gallaghers’, and leaves angrily after Fiona declines. She is never heard from again.

=== Ethel ===
Ethel (Madison Davenport), aged thirteen, is Veronica and Kevin's foster child. She was removed from a polygamist colony where her elderly husband, Clyde, was arrested for molestation. Ethel has a son, Jonah, by Clyde, who is also taken in by Veronica and Kevin. Initially, Ethel struggles to adjust to her new home but soon warms up to Kevin, Veronica, and the Gallaghers. In the middle of season 2, Ethel meets an African-American boy named Malik who has a daughter the same age as Jonah, and the two quickly fall in love. Clyde is murdered in prison by Malik's father. Ethel's sister wives break the news to Ethel and urge her to return to them. The following morning, Kev and V discover Ethel and Jonah have disappeared with all of their belongings, and find a thank you note from Ethel telling them not to worry. They indeed worry she had left with her sister wives but discover she had dug up two bags of marijuana Kev had buried in the backyard, assuring them that she left with Malik. Malik sells the drugs and the two leave town to elope.

=== Professor Hearst ===
Professor Hearst (Dennis Boutsikaris) is a college professor. He catches Lip trying to take someone else's exam. He tries to channel Lip's talents into worthwhile endeavors and supports him; however, in return, Hearst wants drugs and knowledge about contemporary youth and popular culture to bed his female students.

=== Jess ===
Jess (Missy Doty) is a lesbian and the bartender at The Alibi Room. She is witty with a dry sense of humor. When it becomes evident that Kev is dyslexic, she does the bar's books. When the bar's owner Stan starts mentally declining she and Kev argue over how to help Stan.

=== Little Hank ===
Little Hank (Nicky Korba) is Carl's sociopath friend. He often starts pranks and stunts that land him and Carl in trouble and tells Carl deliberately erroneous anatomical facts. Debbie crushes on Little Hank, while Little Hank crushes on Holly Hermiker. Holly rejects Little Hank, and he starts showing interest in Debbie. From season 4 onward he is never heard from again.

=== Adam ===
Adam (James Wolk) is a banker who courts Fiona while she works at a bar. Adam encourages Fiona in her track work and they begin dating. When Steve returns, Fiona, Adam, Steve and Estefania double date. When Adam notices chemistry between Fiona and Steve, he leaves heartbroken and humiliated.

=== Estefânia ===
Estefânia (Stephanie Fantauzzi) is the daughter of a Brazilian drug lord. She marries Jimmy despite her relationship with Marco. At the end of season 2, Marco abuses Estefania and she moves to the Gallagher household. She breaks up a fight between Ian and Frank and knocks Frank when the Gallaghers decide to throw him out for the night. In season 3, Estefania and Marco are living together. When Estefania's father, Nando, comes to the States he shoots Marco in the head and kills him.

=== Lloyd Lishman ===
Dr Lloyd "Ned" Lishman (Harry Hamlin) is Jimmy's father. He is a surgeon who has a brief sexual relationship with Ian. When Jimmy invites Fiona and her siblings to meet his family, both Ian and Ned are stunned to see each other again. Ned reveals to Jimmy that he and his wife are getting a divorce and he spends the night at the Gallaghers after drinking too much. Unfortunately, he accidentally climbs into bed with Lip and everyone is made aware of his relationship with Ian. Despite this, they continue seeing each other. Their relationship makes Mickey jealous and he beats Ned senseless when Ned calls himself Ian's boyfriend. Ian admits he likes Ned since he buys him things and is not afraid to kiss him, prompting Mickey to kiss Ian for the first time. He recruits Ian and Mickey to get some of his things back from the house, telling them they can help themselves to anything else. Ned rushes to the Gallagher house to remove the shrapnel from Mickey's wound when his ex-wife shoots him in the buttock. In the Hall of Shame during season 11, Ian learns that he died during the COVID-19 pandemic.

=== Nando ===
Nando (Pêpê Rapazote) is Estefania's father and a Brazilian drug lord. He tells Jimmy that he can see Fiona as much as he wants but he wants Estefania to become a US citizen. Nando assigns Beto to watch over Jimmy and follow him wherever he goes. Nando tells Jimmy to get a job, stay out of trouble, and stop stealing cars. Near the end of the third season, Nando learns Estefania is being deported and takes Jimmy away on his boat with the intention of murdering him.

=== Robbie Pratt ===
Robbie Pratt (Nick Gehlfuss; season 4) is Mike's drug-addict brother. Fiona starts an affair with Robbie while dating Mike. Robbie is irresponsible and lives a careless life. He leeches off Mike and his parents and justifies his manipulative actions by saying that he cannot live a "normal, boring" life with a desk job like his brother.

While at their parents’ home, Robbie spitefully tells Mike of his relationship with Fiona, leading to Mike punching Robbie and dumping Fiona. When Fiona rejects Robbie, he leaves a bag of cocaine at Fiona's house that Liam ingests which leads to her arrest. Fiona tells Robbie he ruined her life as she can no longer get a job and violates her probation by getting intoxicated. The next day, she takes ecstasy, joyrides with Robbie's friends, and is abandoned at a gas station. Debbie angrily tells Robbie to stay away from Fiona.

=== Ron Kuzner ===
Ron Kuzner (Adam Cagley) is a regular character in season 4 and makes a cameo appearance in season 5. He is Lip's supportive college roommate. Lip steals from Ron and goes behind his back with his girlfriend Amanda. When Ron walks in on the two, he reacts rather calm, and thanks Lip for getting Amanda off his back, stating she was too demanding.

=== Amanda ===
Amanda (Nichole Sakura) is a recurring character in seasons 4 and 5 and a guest character in season 6. She is the rebellious adopted daughter of Jason and Sheryl, a wealthy white couple. In season 4 she is a friend with benefits of Ron and Lip. Amanda helps Lip care for Liam in his college room when Fiona is jailed, and she becomes attracted to Lip. She seduces Lip and reveals to him that she has never had vaginal sex and that she is saving herself for her husband. She begins organizing Lip's daily schedule and starts buying him suits and expensive jewelry. According to Amanda, she was rescued from a Subic Bay brothel. Her parents pay Lip $10,000 to stay away from Amanda but Lip and Amanda continue to see each other.

In season 5, Amanda invites Lip to spend a week in the summer with her and her family at their estate in Miami where Lip bonds with her father. In their second year of college, she invites Lip to move in with her at an off-campus apartment. She finds a roommate, Muff Bull Dagger, on Craigslist after Lip declines. Muff is a violent, sociopathic lesbian who stalks Amanda. She hides in Lip's room to avoid Muff and learns Lip is having sex with Helene. She becomes more attached and possessive of Lip as she falls in love with him while Lip distances himself as he falls for Helene, even going so far as to blatantly ditch Amanda. When she confronts him in the college library, Amanda punches Lip and accuses him of making her fall in love with him.

In season 6, Amanda returns and gets her revenge on Lip by posting a nude photo of Helene online, which results in the latter being fired from the university. Her actions anger a group of the students and she is run off campus.

=== Bonnie ===
Bonnie (Morgan Lily) is a recurring character in season 4. She becomes Carl's friend and accomplice when they meet in detention after school. She lives in a van in a grocery store parking lot with her siblings. At the end of the season Bonnie disappears.

=== Jackie Scabello ===
Jackie Scabello (Alessandra Balazs) has a cameo appearance in season 4 and is a recurring character in season 5. She is one of Fiona's co-workers at Pasty's Pies. Jackie, similar to many of the other employees, is a recovering addict and is trying to make positive strides in her life in order to gain custody of her daughter. After her appeal for custody is denied, Fiona and Sean find her in her apartment unconscious after a heroin overdose. She recovered but Sean tells Fiona that he has no choice but to terminate her employment.

=== Sean Pierce ===
Sean Pierce (Dermot Mulroney) appears in seasons 5 and 6. He is a heroin addict who struggles to quit. He has a son, Will, who was taken away to Pittsburgh by the boy's mother. Sean manages a diner and is Fiona's rehabilitation supervisor. The chemistry between the two of them is immediately apparent, but both resist for personal reasons. Fiona turns to Sean for help after her relationship with Gus fails along with other issues. They are in a relationship throughout season 6. Sean confesses to Fiona that his past includes murdering a fellow drug user while high, which she is unfazed by. He helps out Fiona and her siblings multiple times, letting Fiona stay when the Gallaghers lose the house and eventually asking her to move in, buying Gus' ring back from the pawn shop, and getting Carl out of the drug business. He and Frank hate each other. When Sean and Fiona are about to get married Frank reveals Sean's relapse to Fiona at the altar. Sean leaves to focus on Will, saying that Will is more important. In season 8, he asks her to meet him in a diner to tell her that he married someone else.

=== Gus Pfender ===
Gus Pfender (Steve Kazee) is a recurring character in season 5. Gus is a bass guitarist for an indie rock band who Fiona meets when she works in the diner; they marry on impulse. Gus goes on tour without Fiona because she cheats on him with Jimmy. He is infuriated when he returns when he learns Fiona moved on with Sean. When Fiona attempts to apologize and remain friends by going to his gig, he sings a humiliating song about her. Fiona pawns his grandmother's engagement ring in retaliation in order to get a mortgage to buy her home back. He returns some time later, asking for the ring and a divorce. Sean buys the ring back for him so Gus can finalize their divorce while he can propose to Fiona.

=== Derek Delgado ===
Derek Delgado (Luca Oriel, Seasons 5-6 and Damien Diaz, Season 8) is a recurring character in season 5 and is Debbie's boyfriend. He is an aspiring mixed martial artist who fosters Debbie's passion for fighting. Derek claims he placed third in a city championship. He is the father of Debbie's baby Franny.

In season 6, he moves to Florida with his grandmother after finding out Debbie is pregnant. At the end of Season 8, Derek returns and wants to share custody of Franny. In season 10, its revealed that Derek died having gotten "sideways drunk stole the tank, drove it into the Suez Canal" and had thought said tank was a submarine. According to the army, Derek's body is still beneath the sea. It is also revealed that he had children with his wife Peppa.

=== Bianca Samson ===
Bianca Samson (Bojana Novakovic) is a recurring character in season 5. She is a physician who examines Frank's gunshot wound and is diagnosed with terminal pancreatic cancer and decides her whole medical career was for nothing. She starts a freewheeling relationship with Frank to get away from her parents who want Bianca to treat the cancer. Frank takes helps her experience everything she's ever wanted to do; use drugs, streak, get drunk, get even with old rivals, etc. She buys Frank a $10,100 bottle of Macallan whiskey '39, which is destroyed when they make love on the train tracks. After smoking crack at the Gallagher house, while Bianca is sleeping, Frank sends a text message (posing as Bianca) to her family to come pick her up. Bianca feels betrayed, and Frank confesses he wants her to get treatment so the two can be together longer, and Bianca assures Frank she is not in love with him. The two then flee to Costa Rica, where they purchase a revolver, and Bianca plays Russian Roulette twice in front of Frank, both times on an empty chamber. Frank wakes up to find that Bianca has walked into the sea, leaving behind her clothes, a letter to her family and her pain medication, and Frank understands that she has gone off to die.

=== Helene Runyon ===
Helene Runyon (Wallace in season 5) (Sasha Alexander) is a recurring character in seasons 5 and 6. She is a highly respected Professor of Critical Theory at the college Lip attends. She and Lip have an affair throughout the last four episodes of season 5 and the first five episodes of season 6. Helene's husband, Theo, (Michael Reilly Burke), is aware of Helene and Lip's relationship. Lip's affair with her develops into an unhealthy obsession, leading him to attack her college age son, who he thought was also sleeping with her. Helene's affair with Lip comes to an abrupt halt when Lip's ex-girlfriend Amanda posts a nude photo of Helene in Lip's room throughout the whole college.

In the sixth episode of season 6, Lip tries to protect her in front of the college board and help her keep her job. When Helene is summoned to the college board (with Lip remaining in attendance) she tells them that in addition to cutting off all ties with Lip, she will also be seeking a psychologist to help her with her sex addiction. Lip tries to talk to her one last time as she leaves the school grounds, having openly proclaimed his love for her in the college board meeting, but Helene looks him in the eye and tells him to never contact her again, to stay away from her and her family, and to keep out of her life as she tries to fix her own problems. Lip goes to her house drunk one night, and yells at her to talk to him, but she does not respond. In the tenth episode of season 7, he drunkenly breaks into her house. She tells him to move on and get help for his alcoholism.

=== Professor Youens ===
Professor Clyde Youens (Alan Rosenberg) is a recurring character in seasons 6–8. He is a professor at Chicago Polytechnic University and acts as a father figure, mentor, and drinking buddy to Lip, whom he employs as a teaching assistant. After a falling out with Lip towards the end of season 6, he bails Lip out of jail and encourages him to enter alcohol rehab. Youens has his own struggles with alcohol and has a strained relationship with his daughter. Lip goes out of his way to help Youens with a drunk driving case, only for Youens to lose due to being intoxicated during trial. Youens makes it clear to Lip he does not want his help, and has accepted his defeat to alcoholism for a long time. He dies while incarcerated due to a withdrawal-induced seizure.

=== Dominique Winslow ===
Dominique Winslow (Jaylen Barron) is a recurring character in seasons 6 and 7. At first, she rebuffs Carl because of his gangster-like ways even though he provides her a bike for transportation. After Carl's friend Nick murders someone, Carl decides that thug life is not for him and distances himself from Dominique, which causes her to gain an interest in him. She meets him and tells him to be real with her. She also tells him that her friends have lost their virginity and she wants to lose hers. Carl has sex with Dominique and they start a relationship.

In Season 7, she and Carl are still together with her defending him from her disapproving father, Luther (Peter Macon). She later convinces him to get circumcised which he finds extremely difficult to endure the healing process due to teenage hormones . Sometime later, she cheats on Carl and gets gonorrhea from an older man. Her father believes it was Carl, persecuting Carl with him stalking Dominique to discover that she is cheating on him with a frat boy so Carl enlists Luther's assistance as an officer to do a SWAT hit on the fraternity thereby busting Dominique, initiating a friendship between Carl and Luther who inspires Carl to become a police officer. Dominique becomes hostile to Carl after he bonds with her father, who is now much harder on her. When Carl decides to go to military school, Dominique apologizes for her actions and he considers getting back with her. Her father shows Carl that she is with a new boy who reveals he is not circumcised as Dominique states it did not bother her now. She is humiliated by Carl revealing her STD to her new boyfriend as revenge.

=== Luther Winslow ===
Luther Winslow (Peter Macon) Luther is a recurring character in seasons 6 and 7. He is Dominique's father who takes an immediate dislike to Carl because of his gangster-like ways when he tries to hit on his daughter. After Carl gives up being a gangster and gets into a relationship with his daughter, he disapproves of it.

In Season 7, Dominique defends Carl from him. When Dominique gets gonorrhea, Luther believes it was Carl and hunts him down before Carl reveals he was clean. He shows Luther that Dominique was with a college boy and the two of them join to get her back. Luther bonds with Carl and is now much harder on his daughter. Luther helps Carl get into military school. Luther learns of Carl's decision to go and shows Carl that Dominique is with a new boy, which causes Carl to set himself back on the path of military school and he thanks Luther for it.

=== Margo Mierzejewski ===
Margo Mierzejewski (Sharon Lawrence) is a recurring character. She is introduced in season 7 as a self-made real estate mogul, who is trying to gentrify some of the South Side neighborhoods. Her company also owns Patsy's Pies. After Fiona becomes the manager of Patsy's, she meets Margo and learns that she is also a high school dropout, but has amassed a net worth of $300 million. Eventually, Fiona decides to follow in Margo's footsteps and buys Etta's deteriorating laundromat to start building wealth. However, Margo owns the building that houses the laundromat, and wants to buy the lease from Fiona. When the latter refuses to sell it, Margo offers her $160,000—twice what Fiona paid for the lease—to get it, and Fiona agrees.

In season 8, Margo is revealed to own an abandoned church in the neighborhood of Fiona's apartment building. When she loses interest in that place, she tries to sell it to two artists before agreeing to rent it to Trevor to house the kids from his youth center. Not knowing the shelter is supposed to be Trevor's, Fiona tries to convince the artists to buy the church, as the shelter would not raise the neighborhood's reputation. Margo loses interest in renting out the church, so Ian decides to get the money to buy it for Trevor. Margo chooses to finalize the deal with the artists which creates a rift between the Gallagher siblings. She later faces a lawsuit from her squatter tenants and Fiona tries to sell her apartment building to Margo. When Margo realizes that Fiona does not really want to sell, she gives her some advice to get rid of her tenants.

In season 9, she briefly returns to fire Fiona from Patsy's after receiving numerous complaints for her drunken and erratic behavior.

In the series finale, Frank discovers that Patsy's has gone out of business, suggesting that Margo had to close it down due to the COVID-19 pandemic.

=== Sierra Morton ===
Sierra Morton (Ruby Modine) is a recurring character since season 7. She is a new employee at Patsy's Pies who Lip starts dating. She is a single mother to a son named Lucas. Her brother is physically disabled and is briefly engaged to Debbie. Lip and Sierra have a casual sexual relationship and he is scared it will get too serious given his commitment issues; he starts panicking and she admonishes him, telling him that he is not the playboy he thinks he is. When Lip finally realizes that she is a good-hearted person and wants a deeper relationship she tells him she has her own issues to worry about and is not with him to be his support group. Sierra's baby daddy is a drug addict named Charlie. Lip drunkenly beats him up when he shows up to their job. Sierra tells Lip she cannot deal with two addicts in her life.

Near the end of the season, Sierra tries to reconcile with Lip once his parents stay with her brother and sees what he had put up with. When Monica dies in the finale, Sierra accompanies him and they finally make up and become friends.

In season 8, she and Lip are on better terms as friends and tells him that she gave Charlie another chance. However, her attempts end when she discovers he got another girl pregnant. Sierra turns to Lip which develops into a relationship. Sierra's father is released on parole for the death of her mother; she is worried but Lip helps her by secretly getting the man sent back. For the rest of the season, she and Lip are on better terms in their relationship though he sees himself as mostly a rebound to her. In the finale, Lip breaks up with her and tells her to give Charlie a chance. Even though he admits his love for her, he does not think he can love her like she does him.

=== Neil Morton ===
Neil Morton (Zack Pearlman) is a recurring character since season 7. He is Sierra's brother. He is a wheelchair user after a sports accident as a kid. He runs into Debbie at Patsy's Pie, as she starts to think he could give her a home to get her daughter back. They later attempt to marry to do so but are turned down by Frank and Fiona. While Debbie enjoyed being with him because of his honesty, she did not appear attracted to him.

In Season 8, Neil starts to notice Debbie is taking advantage of him for her own gratification and tries many things to change that but nothing works. When Debbie sends her friend who was a nurse to care for Neil, he falls for her and promptly dumps Debbie, while calling her an awful person who wanted him for his money. He also ignores her warnings that the nurse is probably doing the same.

=== Lucas Morton ===
Lucas Morton (Cooper J. Friedman) is Sierra's son. He finds Sierra and Lip having sex in season 7. She is very protective of him because his father Charlie is a drug addict. Lip offers to babysit him while Sierra goes to a date with Charlie in season 8.

=== Charlie ===
Charlie (Chet Hanks) is Sierra's ex-boyfriend and Lucas' father. Sierra tries to keep him out of Lucas' life because of his drug addiction. In season 8, she decides to give him a new chance but breaks up with him when she finds out he impregnated another girl.

=== Eddie ===
Eddie (Levy Tran) is a co-worker of Lip's in season 8. She is the half sister of Mercy Galvez and half aunt to Xan Galvez.

=== Trevor ===
Trevor (Elliot Fletcher) is a transgender man who is an LGBTQ+ activist. Ian Gallagher falls for him over the course of the 7th season. Trevor does not like talking about his past. He introduces Ian to his friends, who are all part of the LGBTQ+ community, which prompts Ian to ask questions and learn more about it. After some reluctance due to their seeming incompatibility in the bedroom, Ian and Trevor start sleeping together and begin to form a strong relationship. Trevor meets and somewhat bonds with Monica and learns more about Ian. When Mickey drifts back into Ian's life, Trevor is left on the sidelines when Ian departs Chicago with Mickey. When Ian returns after being out of contact for more than a week, Trevor is sympathetic to his motivations and Monica's recent death, but makes it clear that their relationship is over.

In season 8, Trevor maintains firm boundaries with Ian, though obvious that a spark is still there. Ian, trying to work his way back into Trevor's good graces, spends much of his time and money at the LGBTQ+ center. Trevor begins to warm back up to Ian, and the two settle into a friendship, albeit one with much flirting. Trevor nearly ends things again when one of his kids loses a place in a shelter because Ian thoughtlessly helped her, but Ian responds by helping Trevor try and open a new shelter in an abandoned church. The added time together eventually leads to them again giving in to their simmering attraction. As Ian's Gay Jesus movement begins to build, Trevor disappears.

=== Nessa Chabon ===
Nessa Chabon (Jessica Szohr) is a tenant in Fiona's apartment building in season 8. She is a "tough and smart lesbian". She and Fiona become close friends throughout the season. She likes "blond and bitchy" girls like her actual girlfriend, Mel (Perry Mattfeld).

=== Brad Young ===
Bradley "Brad" Young (Scott Michael Campbell) works at Born Free Cycles fixing motorcycles and is married to Camile Young, whose sister Tami becomes Lip's wife. During the eighth season, he employs Lip at his workshop after meeting him at an Alcoholics Anonymous meeting and advises him about his feelings toward Sierra. When his baby is born, he relapses, assaults Lip, and runs away. Lip begins to look for him and is the only one who believes in him. He stands by his side and gets him to stop using and go back to his family. In season 9, Brad gets married and continues to attend Alcoholics Anonymous meetings with Lip. His sister-in-law Tami subsequently has a baby with Lip.

=== Ingrid Jones ===
Ingrid Jones (Katey Sagal) is a psychotherapist. She appears in season 9. When Frank meets her at the hospital, she has a psychotic break and tricks him into releasing her. Before running away, she pounces on Frank, slaps him several times and gives him a kiss, making him fall in love with her. He goes to look for her and persuades her to stop taking her medication. She tries to get pregnant with her frozen eggs and wants Frank to fertilize them, but the clinic warns him that he is not fertile, and he uses Carl's sperm instead. She gets pregnant with six babies thinking they're Frank's, although they're really Carl's. Ingrid talks to Frank's family and everyone tells her that he will not help her in the care of her children. She leaves with her ex-husband.

=== Mikey O'Shea ===
Mikey O'Shea (Luis Guzmán) is a contestant that competed in the Hobo Loco Contest organized by the Bachman Alcohol company to promote their energy drink in episode 9 of season 9. At first he proposes to Frank that they help each other, but when Frank refuses, he plays dirty. They both plead for money by pretending to be homosexual war veterans, going as far as kissing each other. Both Frank and he become finalists but neither of them win and in episode 4 season 10, reveals that he has kidney cancer and deliberately gets himself arrested to receive medical care.

=== Kelly Keefe ===
Kelly Keefe (Jess Gabor) appears in season 9 and 10 and is Sergeant Major Keefe's daughter. She meets Carl at a cocktail party of West Point aspirants and ends up in a relationship with him. Debbie and Kelly's close relationship makes Carl suspect that she is a lesbian. When Carl threatens to leave for military school, Kelly returns to him and forces him to pursue his dream. While away at camp, Kelly is sleeping with another boy and contracts an STD. She returns to find Carl interested in another girl, and the two decide to break up.

=== Melinda ===
Melinda (Rebecca Metz) is a waitress at Patsy's Pies.

=== Officer Arthur Tipping ===
Officer Arthur Tipping (Joshua Malina) appears in season 11 as Carl Gallagher's partner in the Chicago PD. Initially, Tipping is conflict avoidant, which causes tension between him and Carl. After suffering a massive heart attack, he returns to the force much more willing to take on dangerous assignments. He becomes impressed with Carl's dedication to being a meter maid, and the two become good friends. In the season finale, they consider buying the Alibi Room and turning it into a bar for cops.

=== Officer Leesie Jane ===
Officer Leesie Jane (Toks Olagundoye) is Carl's policing mentor appearing in episode "Frances Francis Franny Frank", utilising professionally questionable policing methods such as using a machete to scare a shoplifting suspect and letting him run away unharmed. Jane mentions having served in Iraq and she disappears in episode "NIMBY".

=== Aunt Ginger ===
Aunt Ginger (Gloria LeRoy) was a character that appeared in the episodes, "Aunt Ginger" and "Summer Loving". She is an old woman who was taken from the elders home that Veronica works at. She was used to throw off an Office of Inspector General worker named Abby Ruggiero after she came to the Gallagher home suspecting that they were cashing Ginger's checks without her consent.
