= Conditional love =

Relationship dynamic

Conditional love is a love that is based upon the recipient of the love meeting certain conditions imposed by the lover. As opposed to the humanistic belief of unconditional love, it is argued that all forms of love are conditional in nature. While unconditional love is said to be the ideal of romantic, parental, or other meaningful relationships, it cannot be completely achieved. Many relationships require the use of conditions in order to satisfy the needs of the lover and recipient.

This does not necessarily imply that conditional love is selfish or reward seeking, but rather asserts that love is achieved upon meeting the conditions that the lover views as valuable. If a lover feels love for another, it is likely due to the other's qualities that match the ideals of the lover - meaning it is conditional. This sort of love is created by the values of these conditions put by the lover themselves.

It is possible, and actually ideal for conditional and unconditional love to coexist. Conditions are necessary for lovers to examine their values while identifying the benefits of a relationship compared to the detriments or risks. At the same time, unconditional love shows a reduction of risk and a willingness to show appreciation to the other.

== Unconditional love ==
Unconditional love is the affection of another that looks beyond personal conditions or limitations. It is one of the primary ideologies behind humanism and various religions including; Christianity, Buddhism, and Hinduism. Unconditional love is thought to be one of the highest and most powerful forms of human expression that encourages altruism and empathy. Those who experience unconditional love are more likely to reveal their true selves and be more congruent with their innermost personhood.
