= Carl Franklin =

American film and television director, screenwriter, producer, actor (b. 1949)

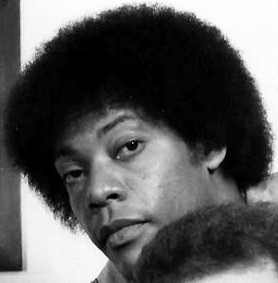
- Franklin in a publicity photo for The Fantastic Journey (1977)
- Born: Carl Michael Franklin; April 11, 1949 (age 77); Richmond, California, U.S.
- Education: University of California, Berkeley (BA); American Film Institute (MFA)
- Occupations: Film director, television director, actor, screenwriter, television producer
- Years active: 1973–present

Carl Michael Franklin (born April 11, 1949) is an American film and television director, producer, screenwriter, and former actor. He began his career in the 1970s as a television actor, playing regular roles as Dr. Fred Walters on The Fantastic Journey, Detective Jerry Cross on McClain's Law, and Captain Crane on The A-Team. In the 1980s, he graduated from the AFI Conservatory, and began directing B-movies at Roger Corman's Concorde Pictures.

His 1992 film One False Move (1992), written by and starring Billy Bob Thornton, earned him the Best Director Award at the 8th Independent Spirit Awards. His subsequent cinematic directorial efforts include Devil in a Blue Dress and Out of Time; both starring Denzel Washington, One True Thing, High Crimes, and Bless Me, Ultima.

Since the 2010s, most of his work has been for television, including shows such as: Rome, The Pacific, The Newsroom, House of Cards, Homeland, The Affair, The Leftovers, 13 Reasons Why, Ray Donovan, Mindhunter, and the Ryan Murphy production Monster. His television accolades include a BAFTA TV Award, two NAACP Image Awards, and two Primetime Emmy Award nominations.

== Early life ==
Franklin was born and raised in Richmond, California. He never had the opportunity to know his biological father, who had died before Carl was born. Franklin was raised by his mother and stepfather. While Franklin speaks highly of his stepfather and has called him "very loving", he has spoken about his stepfather's abusive tendencies, linking his outbursts to alcohol use. Problems at home combined with life in a tough neighborhood fueled Franklin's ambition to be the first in his family to attend college.

He was awarded a scholarship to University of California, Berkeley. Franklin's initial desires to become a teacher or lawyer led him to study history upon his arrival at the university. However, after two years, Franklin changed his major to theater arts. Franklin did not actively participate in the many demonstrations at Berkeley in the period. Describing the scene, Franklin told the Los Angeles Times: "It was like a dream to me, I wasn't really sophisticated enough to join a particular movement."

== Career ==
=== Acting ===
After graduation, Franklin made his theater debut as a slave in The Public Theater's production of Timon of Athens. He would go on to act in Mark Taper Forum's production of In the Belly of the Beast.

One of his first jobs was acting in the New York Shakespeare Festival, where he appeared in the Twelfth Night and Cymbeline.

Franklin began his on-screen career in the film Five on the Black Hand Side in 1973. From there, he acted in a string of guest roles on television shows such as Barnaby Jones; episode titled "Focus on Fear" (January 31, 1980). The Rockford Files, Good Times, The Incredible Hulk and The Streets of San Francisco. Over the years, Franklin's looks have typically landed him roles portraying men of power, such as members of the police force or military officials.

Between 1975 and 1985 Franklin was a regular cast member in four TV series. The first, ABC's Caribe in 1975, was a law enforcement drama that aired 13 episodes and cast him as police sergeant Mark Walters. Two years later, NBC's fantasy-science fiction series The Fantastic Journey lasted for 10 episodes, with Franklin as athletic young physician Dr. Fred Walters. After four more years, a two-hour television film, McClain's Law, led to Franklin's second police series titled, per the telefilm, McClain's Law, a modern-day NBC vehicle for Gunsmoke star James Arness, with Franklin fifth-billed as police detective Jerry Cross, but the 1981–82 series only lasted 14 episodes. Franklin's longest lasting and most recognizable acting role was his 1983–85 portrayal of Captain Crane on the popular action-adventure series The A-Team.

=== Directing ===
Inspired by the low-budget films of the 1980s, such as Chan Is Missing (1982), Franklin enrolled at the AFI Conservatory in Los Angeles in 1986. His 30-minute M.F.A. thesis film Punk is about an African-American boy in South-central Los Angeles dealing with his sexuality and manhood. Straight out of his Master's program, Franklin landed a job with movie producer-director Roger Corman in 1989.

While working at Corman's Concorde Films, Franklin gained experience working on low-budget films, helping to crank out six films in just two years' time. From 1989 to 1990, Franklin worked on Nowhere to Run, Eye of the Eagle 2: Inside the Enemy, and Full Fathom Five, respectively, under Concord Films.

At the end of the 80s, producer Jesse Beaton was looking for a director for a film called One False Move. Remembering Franklin's short film Punk, Beaton met Carl to discuss the film's vision. Franklin's approach to the screenplay produced a thriller of the film noir genre. The story follows three drug dealers, played by Billy Bob Thornton, Cynda Williams, and Michael Beach and their interactions with a small-town Arkansas police chief played by Bill Paxton. Far from his low-budget past, Franklin's budget of $2 million gave him a bit of room to be creative, and achieve his entire vision for the film. However, the original version of the film, which was released in 1991, was thought to be overly violent. In response to such claims, Franklin told the Observer, "I didn't want people getting excited seeing how neat someone can be killed... I want the audience to feel the emotional loss of life--the real violence is the loss, the violation of humanity. They've taken from us someone who had dreams, hopes, the same set of emotions we have."

Despite the film's lack of professional publicity, One False Move was largely promoted by word of mouth and earned itself mixed reviews. However, the reviews that were positive were very positive, gaining the project more attention. The film was named Best Film of the Year by Gene Siskel, and one of the 10 Best Films of 1992 by the National Review Board.

Franklin collaborated with producers Jonathan Demme and Jesse Beaton on adapting Walter Mosley's novel Devil in a Blue Dress after Demme acquired its film rights. Franklin directed and wrote the screenplay for the film on a US$21,000,000 budget. The film starred Denzel Washington as Ezekiel "Easy" Rawlins.

Switching to television, Franklin directed Laurel Avenue, a two-part miniseries focused on an African-American family in Minnesota for HBO in 1993. One issue in particular that stood out in the series was the issue of drug use. Franklin defended his depictions, explaining that "Drugs are a huge problem in the black community. Not to include that would be a stupid oversight. But if the subject of drugs is introduced in the context of a hardworking family that has managed to maintain unity, and the audience sees drugs as a threat to that unity, they get a much greater understanding of the problem."

Following Laurel Avenue, Franklin found himself maintaining A-list status, which allowed him to work on bigger and more visible projects, such as 1998's One True Thing. The film is an adaptation of an autobiographical story by New York journalist Anna Quindlen, following a woman (Renée Zellweger) with no option but to leave Manhattan for the small town where she was raised when her mother (Meryl Streep) is diagnosed with cancer.

Franklin went on to direct High Crimes, starring Morgan Freeman and Ashley Judd, and Out of Time, which reunited him with Devil in a Blue Dress star Denzel Washington. Since then, Franklin has largely transitioned to high-profile television work. He has worked on two series produced by Steven Spielberg, directing the pilot of science fiction drama Falling Skies and an episode of the World War II drama The Pacific. He has also collaborated on two series with David Fincher, directing four episodes each of House of Cards and Mindhunter. Franklin directed multiple critically acclaimed episodes of the HBO series The Leftovers, across all three of its seasons. His prolific television credits also include Rome, The Newsroom, Homeland, Ray Donovan, and Dahmer – Monster: The Jeffrey Dahmer Story.

In 2023, Franklin expressed interest in someday directing a feature-length film of his AFI short Punk.

== Unrealized projects ==
After Devil in a Blue Dress, Franklin and Denzel Washington planned to collaborate on a trilogy of films based on the Easy Rawlins character, but this never materialized.

Around 1996–97, Franklin was attached to direct a film of the Russell Banks novel Rule of the Bone, but the project stalled at Columbia/TriStar. Filmmaker Paul Thomas Anderson allegedly was hired to write the script, later saying "I didn't do a very good job. I didn't really know what I was doing in general, let alone how to adapt a book."

In January 1997, Variety indicated that Franklin was set to direct a thriller for Fox 2000 about ex-spy Aldrich Ames. The film was titled Killer Spy, with Nicolas Cage reportedly being courted by the studio for the main role, though Al Pacino was later attached. By June, Franklin had left the project, with James Gray entering negotiations to direct in his place.

In June 1997, it was reported that Franklin had dropped out of directing Brokedown Palace, citing "creative differences" over the casting of the film. Jonathan Kaplan took over for Franklin following his departure.

In 1999, Franklin was attached as the director of the sci-fi film The Mothman Prophecies, with Richard Gere starring, before Mark Pellington was chosen.

Franklin was attached to direct Will Smith in the fourth remake of the musical A Star Is Born for Warner Bros., though Smith passed up the role in order to star in Ali.

In 2000, Franklin was expected to begin filming The Shooter, an adaptation of Point of Impact by Stephen Hunter. However, he stepped down as the director and writer of the project, which at the time was planned as a co-production between Paramount Pictures and Lakeshore Entertainment.

In 2001, Franklin was announced to direct and produce a film adaptation of the novel Rescue Me, by Gigi Levangie, who sold the rights to Fox Searchlight. As of the announcement, no screenwriter was attached to adapt the story.

In 2002, it was reported that writer Sid Quashie was tapped by Paramount Pictures to adapt Susan Kelly's 1995 book The Boston Stranglers, with Franklin attached to direct. The film was scheduled to go into production that summer, with Gale Anne Hurd and Jesse Beaton producing.

In 2003, Franklin was set to direct the legal thriller The Emperor of Ocean Park for Warner Bros. Pictures from the novel by Stephen L. Carter, adapted by Stephen Schiff.

In early 2007, Franklin had been attached to direct the legal drama Tulia for Lionsgate Films, starring Halle Berry and Billy Bob Thornton. Karen Croner wrote the script for the film, based on the Nate Blakeslee book Tulia: Race, Cocaine, and Corruption in a Small Texas Town. In August that year, John Singleton took over directing duties from Franklin, who departed from the project. The film was not made.

On July 23, 2007, it was reported that Franklin would direct The Maintenance Man, the Screen Gems adaptation of Michael Baisden's novel about a gigolo in existential crisis, set to begin shooting later that year.

On July 31, 2007, it was reported that Franklin would direct Snitch for New Line Cinema, a thriller produced by Guy East and Nigel Sinclair inspired by true events chronicled in a PBS Frontline documentary. Justin Haythe, who wrote the screenplay, was to executive produce the film along with Franklin's producing partner Jesse Beaton.

In 2009, HBO was developing a historical miniseries from Franklin about the Black Panther Party called The Black Panthers, which he was writing and attached to direct and executive produce. He later further developed it as a project for Netflix.

On February 8, 2011, Peter Facinelli was reported to write the script for, star in and co-produce the indie crime drama El Chico Blanco, with Franklin directing. Titan Worldwide Entertainment was financing the project, which would have been shot in New Mexico.

On May 29, 2012, Meyers Media Group and McDonald Entertainment announced that they would co-finance the thriller City of Night, to be directed by Franklin, written by David Chisholm and produced by Brendan McDonald. Set against the backdrop of South Central L.A., the film follows a rookie cop who becomes the target of an elaborate psychological game to destroy him. A date for principal photography was soon to be announced, but the project did not move forward.

In March 2013, it was reported that Franklin would direct a biopic about the life of soul music singer/songwriter Sam Cooke. ABKCO Records was set to independently produce the project. As of 2015, Franklin was still developing the film, which was then in the process of being cast from a script he wrote himself, based on Peter Guralnick's biography Dream Boogie: The Triumph of Sam Cooke.

In April 2015, Franklin replaced John Singleton as director of Morgan Creek's Tupac, a biopic written by Jeremy Haft and Ed Gonzalez about rapper Tupac Shakur. Casting for the role was reportedly under way, with principal photography planned to begin in August or September.

In May 2016, Franklin was announced to be directing a film adaptation of William Faulkner's Intruder in the Dust. Our House Productions held the rights to produce the adaptation of the 1948 novel, with distribution rights for the project being sold at that year's Cannes Film Festival.

In July 2016, John Malkovich signed on to star in and executive produce Humboldt, a TV drama series to be directed by Franklin, inspired by Emily Brady's best-selling book Humboldt: Life on America's Marijuana Frontier. The project was written on spec by Michael A. Lerner, and set up at Sony Pictures Television and Anonymous Content. Despite Franklin's prolific career in television, this never came to fruition either.

In 2018, it was reported that Franklin was prepping to direct Excessive Force, a thriller about racism and corruption in the Cleveland police department written by Jeff Kwatinetz and Ice Cube and set to star Cube in the main role. The film was planned to enter production that fall, produced under Cube's production banner CubeVision.

In 2022, Franklin was attached to the series Black Harvest, set in Paris in 1952, as executive producer. The project was developed with Epix Studios.

== Race and film ==
Franklin says "I am interested in the universal values of the black experience."

Discussing the realities for black Americans in the television and film industry, Franklin said: "When I came up, the only legitimate dramatic actor was Sidney Poitier, the bankable star was Richard Pryor and the other choice roles were action parts that went to Jim Brown. Even someone as good as Billy Dee Williams had a couple of great moments and then couldn't get a decent part."

== Personal life ==
Franklin married film producer Jesse Beaton, who produced One False Move (1992).

== Filmography ==
=== Film ===
Short film

Year	Title	Director	Writer
1986	Punk	Yes	Yes

Feature film

Year	Title	Director	Writer
1989	Eye of the Eagle 2: Inside the Enemy	Yes	Yes
1989	Nowhere to Run	Yes	No
1992	One False Move	Yes	No
1995	Devil in a Blue Dress	Yes	Yes
1998	One True Thing	Yes	No
2001	Hardball	No	Uncredited
2002	High Crimes	Yes	No
2003	Out of Time	Yes	No
2012	Bless Me, Ultima	Yes	Yes

Acting roles

Year	Title	Role	Notes
1973	Five on the Black Hand Side	Marvin	Credited as Carl Mikal Franklin
1989	Eye of the Eagle 2: Inside the Enemy	Colonel Rawlins	
1989	Last Stand at Lang Mei	Sergeant T. Deveraux	
1992	In the Heat of Passion	Detective Rooker	

=== Television ===
Director

Year	Title	Notes
1993	Laurel Avenue	2 episodes
1999	Partners	5 episodes
2007	Rome	Episode: "A Necessary Fiction"
2007	The Riches	Episode: "Pilot"
2009	Last of the Ninth	Unsold HBO pilot
2010	The Pacific	Episode: "Peleliu Landing"
2011	Falling Skies	Episode: "Live and Learn"
2012	Magic City	Episode: "The Year of the Fin"
2013	The Newsroom	Episode: "Unintended Consequences"
2013–14	House of Cards	4 episodes
2013–14	Homeland	Episodes: "Gerontion" and "Redux"
2014	The Affair	2 episodes
2014–17	The Leftovers	4 episodes
2015	Bloodline	Episode: "Part 12"
2016	Vinyl	Episode: "Rock and Roll Queen"
2016	Good Behavior	Episode: "Only The Best For Mrs. Diaz"
2016–17	Chance	2 episodes
2017	13 Reasons Why	2 episodes
2017	Ten Days in the Valley	Episode: "Day 1: Fade In"
2017	Ray Donovan	Episode: "Michael"
2019	I Am the Night	2 episodes
2019	Mindhunter	4 episodes
2022	Dahmer – Monster: The Jeffrey Dahmer Story	Episode: "Bad Meat"
2024	Manhunt	2 episodes
2024	Monsters: The Lyle and Erik Menendez Story	2 episodes
2024	American Sports Story	2 episodes

Acting roles

Year	Title	Role	Notes
1974	The Streets of San Francisco	Dallam	Episode: "Flags of Terror"
1974	It Couldn't Happen to a Nicer Guy	Hovey	
1974–75	Cannon	Various Roles	2 episodes
1975	Caribe	Mark Walters	13 episodes
1975–76	Good Times	Larry Walters	2 episodes
1975–80	Barnaby Jones	Various Roles	2 episodes
1976	Visions	David Burrell	Episode: "Scenes from the Middle Class"
1976	Most Wanted	Tannehill	Episode: "The Torch"
1977	The Fantastic Journey	Dr. Fred Walters	10 episodes
1978	Loose Change	Ed Thomas	3 episodes
1978	The Incredible Hulk	Dr. Crosby	Episode: "Life and Death"
1978	Centennial	Beckworth	Episode: "The Yellow Apron"
1978	The Rockford Files	Roger Orloff	Episode: "Black Mirror"
1979	The Legend of the Golden Gun	Joshua Brown	
1979	Trapper John, M.D.	Steve	Episode: "Deadly Exposure"
1980	The White Shadow	Lonie	Episode: "A Few Good Men"
1980	Joshua's World	Unknown	Uncredited
1980	Lou Grant	Milt Carmichael	Episode: "Streets"
1981–82	McClain's Law	Detective Jerry Cross	15 episodes
1982	Quincy, M.E.	Gary Rediford	Episode: "Deadly Protection"
1982	The Devlin Connection	Unknown	Uncredited; 2 episodes
1983	One Cooks, the Other Doesn't	Officer Lloyd Green	
1983–85	The A-Team	Captain Crane	17 episodes
1985	Cover Up	Paul Cooper	Episode: "Murder Offshore"
1985	MacGyver	Andrew T. Wiley	Episode: "The Prodigal"
1985	Riptide	Ray	Episode: "Requiem for Icarus"
1986	Hill Street Blues	Lucious	Episode: "Das Blues"
1986	A Smoky Mountain Christmas	Lieutenant Danvers	
1987	Frank's Place	Father Phil	Episode: "Disengaged"
1987	ALF	Dr. Willoughby	2 episodes
1988	Too Good to Be True	Unknown	Uncredited
1990	Steel Magnolias	Nick Fontenot	Episode: "Pilot"
1990	Full Fathom Five	Fletcher	Also director
1991–92	Roseanne	Various Roles	2 episodes

Guest appearances

Year	Title	Notes
1977	Battle of the Network Stars II	Team NBC
1995	Century of Cinema	Episode: "A Personal Journey with Martin Scorsese Through American Movies"
1995	Charlie Rose	
1998	Split Screen	Episode: "Carl Franklin Breaks It Down"
1999	The Directors	Episode: "The Films of Carl Franklin"
2006	Shooting the Police: Cops on Film	Documentary
2006	Hitchcocked!	Documentary
2014	House of Cards: Politics for the Sake of Politics	Short documentary

== Awards and nominations ==
Year	Institution	Category	Work	Result
1992	Deauville Film Festival	Critics Award	One False Move	Nominated
1992	Los Angeles Film Critics Association Awards	New Generation Award	One False Move	Won
1992	Mystfest	Best Film	One False Move	Nominated
1992	Mystfest	Best Direction	One False Move	Won
1993	Cognac Festival du Film Policier	Grand Prix	One False Move	Won
1993	Cognac Festival du Film Policier	Critics Award	One False Move	Won
1993	Fantasporto	Best Film	One False Move	Nominated
1993	Independent Spirit Awards	Best Director	One False Move	Won
1993	MTV Movie Awards	Best New Filmmaker	One False Move	Won
1995	San Sebastián International Film Festival	Golden Seashell	Devil in a Blue Dress	Nominated
1996	Edgar Allan Poe Awards	Best Motion Picture	Devil in a Blue Dress	Nominated
1996	American Film Institute	Franklin J. Schaffner Achievement Award	"Outstanding Body of Work"	Won
2004	Black Reel Awards	Best Director	Out of Time	Nominated
2014	Primetime Emmy Awards	Outstanding Directing for a Drama Series	House of Cards ("Chapter 14")	Nominated
2023	Primetime Emmy Awards	Outstanding Directing for a Limited or Anthology Series or Movie	Dahmer – Monster: The Jeffrey Dahmer Story ("Bad Meat")	Nominated
2025	NAACP Image Awards	Outstanding Directing in a Drama Series	Monsters: The Lyle and Erik Menendez Story ("Blame It on the Rain")	Nominated
