= Blue Light (novel) =

1998 novel by Walter Mosley

- First edition
- Author: Walter Mosley
- Original title: Blue Light
- Language: English
- Genre: Science fiction, Horror
- Published: 1998 Little Brown and Company
- Publication place: United States
- Media type: Print (mass market)
- Pages: 400
- ISBN: 978-0-446-60692-9

Blue Light is a science fiction novel by American writer Walter Mosley, published in 1998 by Little Brown & Co.

== Plot summary ==
In 1965, a mysterious beam of blue light came down from space and overlooked Northern California. This light had extraterrestrial powers that caused whomever the beam touched to die, go mad, or acquire a special unique power. This power is defined as full actualization of humankind, with strengths, understandings and communication abilities that exceed our normal capabilities. The people touched by the light in the novel were soon referred to as "Blues" and were segregated from society because of their new and improved super human powers. Soon after this discovery, they came together to try to find their purpose in the universe. As they look for their calling in life, an evil force, the "Gray Man", emerges, setting the stage for a battle later on in the novel between good and evil. The Gray Man is Horace LaFontaine, a character in the novel who was struck by the light at the moment of his death. He was revivified as a demon sent to kill all of the "blues". Once the "blues" discover this nemesis, they take refuge in the forest outside of Northern California. Soon, the Gray Man finds out where they are hiding from inside sources and the "blues" come to a consensus in which they are going to confront their enemy and declare war with the Gray Man. This epic battle takes place at the ending of the novel and has an extraordinary finish. The "blues" all use their powers that they were given to destroy the Gray Man. They soon reside in the small cities of Northern California and live normal lives with the people of California.

== Main characters ==
- Chance: narrates the story, also a "Blue" that has the power of vision
- Claudia: A female "Blue" that has the power to make men lust after her
- Winch Fargo: A murderer who is only partially struck by the light
- Orde: leader and teacher of the "blues"
- Horace LaFontaine: dies from cancer at the moment he is struck by light, becomes the embodiment of death.
- Juan Thrombone: a figure reminiscent of Carlos Castaneda's Native American mystic Don Juan

== Reception ==
Blue Light received mostly positive reviews and it was described as a good read. While many of the reviews were written by science fiction fans, there was one favorable review from The New York Times, which stated that "The fuel that energizes the novel is not its characters but its plot...", which means that the novel has a good background and it is an enjoyable read. SF Signal refers to the novel as "an excellent, well-told, page-turning horror/fantasy hybrid". The reviews also compared this novel to his other famous books the Devil in a Blue Dress and Futureland: Nine Stories of an Imminent World. Many critics point out that the story resembles racism and how the "blues" overcome what African Americans have overcome today. Only one critic felt that the racism was a negative aspect of the novel saying "...the racism in the novel isn't needed...".

Critics have viewed this novel differently over the years but they seem to be consistent when they rate the novel. The reviews give the book anywhere from three to five stars with only one critic giving the novel a two out of five.

== Awards ==
- Blue Light won The New York Times Notable Book of 1998.
- Finalist for the NAACP Award in Fiction
- 1996 - Black Caucus of the American Library Association's Literary Award for RL's Dream
- 1996 - O. Henry Award for a Socrates Fortlow story.
- 2002- Grammy Award for "Best Liner Notes" for a Richard Pryor box set
- 2006 - First recipient of the Carl Brandon Society Parallax Award for his young adult novel 47.
- Mosley was awarded an honorary doctorate from the City College of New York.
