= Always Outnumbered =

- Also known as: Always Outnumbered, Always Outgunned
- Genre: Drama
- Based on: Always Outnumbered, Always Outgunned by Walter Mosley
- Written by: Walter Mosley
- Directed by: Michael Apted
- Starring: Laurence Fishburne; Bill Cobbs; Natalie Cole; Laurie Metcalf; Bill Nunn; Cicely Tyson
- Theme music composer: Michael Franti
- Country of origin: United States
- Original language: English

Production
- Executive producers: Laurence Fishburne; Walter Mosley
- Producers: Jeffrey Downer; Jonathon Ker; Jeanney Kim; Anne-Marie Mackay; Helen McCusker
- Production location: Los Angeles
- Cinematography: John Bailey
- Editor: Rick Shaine
- Running time: 104 minutes
- Production company: HBO Pictures

Original release
- Network: HBO
- Release: March 21, 1998

Always Outnumbered (also known as Always Outnumbered, Always Outgunned) is a television film based on the novel Always Outnumbered, Always Outgunned by author Walter Mosley. It first aired on pay television channel HBO in 1998.

== Plot ==
The film stars Laurence Fishburne as aging ex-con Socrates Fortlow, who after a long incarceration, is trying hard to make a new life and to accept the regrets of his past. He lives in a crime-ridden Los Angeles neighborhood and collects bottles and cans to survive. He meets a young boy named Darryl, who witnessed another child being murdered by a friend of his. He has an immediate connection with Darryl but doesn't treat him with kid gloves.

As he navigates his new existence and tries to make amends for his past mistakes, Socrates also forms and maintains relationships with a variety of different characters, including other ex-cons, local business owners and others from the rough neighborhood.

He helps Darryl throughout the story and also has to deal with being discriminated against by the management at a local supermarket while looking for steady work, seeing a good woman be treated unfairly and his best friend's deteriorating health. All while observing the consequences of his previous actions. As a result, he often finds himself struggling to not explode in a rage and lash out at the world.

== Cast ==
- Laurence Fishburne as Socrates Fortlow
- Bill Cobbs as "Right" Burke
- Natalie Cole as Iula Brown
- Daniel Williams as Darryl
- Cicely Tyson as Luvia
- Laurie Metcalf as Halley Grimes
- Bill Nunn as Howard M'Shalla
- Bridgid Coulter as Corina M'Shalla
- Isaiah Washington as Wilfred
- Bill Duke as "Blackbird" Willis
- Kevin Carroll as Petis
- Jamaal Carter as Phillip
- John Toles-Bey as "Stoney" Wiley
- Brooke Marie Bridges as Winnie M'Shalla
- John Gavigan as Mr. Keene
- Perry Moore as Kiko
- Sammi Rotibi as Marlow Bitta
- Art Evans as Markham Peale
- Danny Goldring as Parker
- Dan Martin as Weems
- Paula Jai Parker as Melodie

== Critical reception ==
The majority of reviews were positive for this film and most praised Lawrence Fishbrune's stellar performance. Upon its release in 1998, Matthew Gilbert at The Boston Globe said "HBO came through with Always Outnumbered, which featured a coolly graceful performance by Laurence Fishburne as a heroic ex-convict."

John Leonard, writing in New York Magazine, described Socrates as "a nineties incarnation of Easy Rawlins", and commended Fishburne for "stand(ing) up well under the weight of all this symbolism", and for keeping Always Outnumbered from being too much like "Porgy (meets) Touched by an Angel and Superfly (meets) The Equalizer."

In a 2021 RogerEbert.com tribute article to director Michael Apted, Matt Zoller Seitz writes "The HBO film Always Outnumbered, Always Outgunned, adapted by Walter Moseley from his collection of intertwined short stories, had a hardboiled crime-novel wrapping, but inside was an observant and often tender portrait of working Black America, with vivid and eccentric characters rarely seen on TV or in movies."

== See also ==
- List of hood films
