= Grey Dawn =

Grey Dawn or Gray Dawn may refer to:

- "Grey Dawn" (South Park), an episode in the animated television series South Park.
- Grey Dawn (album), a 1998 album by the Swedish band October Tide
- Grey Dawn (film), a 2015 Ghanaian-Nigerian drama film
- Gray Dawn (video game), a 2018 Romanian video game
- Grey Dawn II (1962–1991), a French Thoroughbred racehorse
- The Gray Dawn, a 1922 silent film directed by Benjamin B. Hampton
- Gray Dawn (novel), a 2025 novel by Walter Mosley
