= Little Brother (short story) =

"Little Brother" is a short story by Walter Mosley that appeared in his 2001 book of dystopian short stories Futureland: Nine Stories of an Imminent World. Mosley adapted the story into an episode of Masters of Science Fiction, directed by Darnell Martin and starring Clifton Collins Jr.

== Plot summary ==
Frendon Ibrahim Blythe is a prisoner of the "newly instituted, and almost fully automated" Sac'm Justice System in a futuristic version of Sacramento, California. He is being tried for the murder of Officer Terrance Bernard and the assault of his partner, Omar LaTey. Blythe's brain is connected to the computer "judge" through a plastic tube attached to the base of his skull, which allows the System free access to the contents and physiology of his brain. The tube is part of Restraint Mobile Device 27, or RMD 27, an automated "guard." In eliminating human juries and judges, the Sac'm System has essentially created a stark justice system wherein it is impossible to claim justifiable homicide. Blythe must find a way to outwit his virtual judge in order to prove his innocence and avoid the death penalty, the automatic result of a murder charge in the Sac'm System.
