= Fortunate Son (novel) =

2006 novel by Walter Mosley

- Book Cover for Fortunate Son
- Author: Walter Mosley
- Original title: Fortunate Son
- Language: English
- Genre: Novel
- Publisher: Little, Brown and Company
- Publication place: United States
- English publication date: 2006
- Media type: Print (Paperback)
- Pages: 313 pp
- ISBN: 978-0-316-11471-4
- OCLC: 61362754
- Dewey Decimal: 813/.54 22
- LC Class: PS3563.O88456 F67 2006

Fortunate Son (2006) is a novel by Walter Mosley.

== Plot summary ==
After her boyfriend, Elton Trueblood, abandons her after she refuses an abortion, Branwyn Beerman gives birth to her child, whom she later names Thomas. Thomas is born with a hole in his lung, and is given a dire prognosis by the hospital's head paediatrician. While Thomas is in the hospital, she falls in love with a white heart surgeon, Dr. Minas Nolan, whose wife had died due to complications giving birth to an abnormally large and strong "Nordic Adonis" named Eric. Branwyn takes Thomas home in defiance of the hospital, but Thomas survives, living with Eric under one roof, and, while different in every respect, they build a strong friendship as children. They are both cared for by a Vietnamese nanny, Ahn.

Their pleasant state of affairs takes a turn for the worse after Elton returns. Branwyn perishes soon after, leaving Thomas in Elton's hands due to her unmarried status. While Thomas is forced to eke out an existence in the slums, dealing drugs and being sent to jail, Eric goes to college and has no trouble attracting women. However, Eric is also faced with problems as he confronts the consequences of his actions. After years apart, they later reunite and solve their problems together.

== Reception ==
The novel received generally positive attention, with Alan Cheuse for NPR reporting: "As you read along, you recognize that Mosley is a natural storyteller, someone whose instincts for tuning the plot make every which way it goes the right way....The book pulls you along, and for the reader, that's the most important fact about any work of fiction." While Kirkus Reviews observed, "Though he doesn’t duplicate the austere power of The Man in My Basement (2004), Mosley makes his simple tale gripping through the studied artlessness of his storytelling", Janet Maslin wrote in The New York Times: "'Fortunate Son' involves some suspense. But it's not the useful kind -- and certainly not the kind that comes so readily to Mr. Mosley when he writes his Easy Rawlins mystery novels.... This time, despite the ease with which he can always hold a reader's attention, he harps on the obvious and rarely leaves it behind." Michael Moorcock, reviewing the novel for The Guardian, was unequivocal in his praise, referencing Dickens and Sinclair Lewis:

"More than any other contemporary novelist, Walter Mosley's work affects the reader on an immediate, visceral level. His anger is as infectious as his humanity.... Mosley's latest literary novel develops an earlier American tradition represented by the likes of Sinclair Lewis, with its emphasis on social injustice and the great gulf between the American dream and American actuality. In prose soaked in the rich warmth of an east Texas bayou, he tells a story as gripping as Dickens, instantly drawing us into contrasted worlds. Like Dickens, Mosley stands confidently on the social borderline. His lucid style resists sentimentality while constantly offering fresh insights into the mind-set of complex characters, drawn from a wide spectrum of American race and class.... And on the strength of this remarkable book alone, his best to date, Mosley must be considered one of our great novelists."
