= Caribe (American TV series) =

American TV crime drama series

- Created by: Charles K. Peck Jr.
- Starring: Stacy Keach; Carl Franklin; Robert Mandan
- Country of origin: United States
- Original language: English
- No. of seasons: 1
- No. of episodes: 13

Production
- Running time: 60 minutes
- Production company: QM Productions

Original release
- Network: ABC
- Release: February 17 – May 12, 1975

Caribe is an American crime drama series that was originally broadcast on Monday nights at 10:00–11:00 pm (ET) on ABC from February 17 until May 12, 1975. The Quinn Martin-produced series was about the exploits of the Caribe Force, a fictional law enforcement unit that had extra-national jurisdiction throughout the Caribbean, headquartered in Miami.

The stars were Stacy Keach as Lieutenant Ben Logan, a former officer of the Miami Police hired by the Caribe Force, and Carl Franklin as his partner, Sergeant Mark Walters, also formerly of the Miami PD. Originally it was planned that Franklin's character would be a former detective inspector from one of the British Commonwealth island nations in the Caribbean, but the character was ultimately depicted as an American, and as someone who was outranked by Logan, somewhat undercutting both the supposedly international character of the Caribe Force, and the supposedly equal status of the two co-stars. Robert Mandan played their superior, Deputy Commissioner Ed Rawlings.

The series was plagued by production problems.

== Episodes ==
No.	Title	Directed by	Written by	Original release date
1	"The Plastic Connection"	William Wiard	Ed Waters	February 17, 1975
2	"Vanished"	Unknown	Robert I. Holt	February 24, 1975
Lt. Ben Hogan and Sgt. Mark Walters try to save a noted woman flier (Joanna Pettet) from a gangland leader's vengeance.
3	"The Survivor"	Unknown	Larry Forrester	March 3, 1975
4	"The Mercenary"	Paul Stanley	Robert C. Dennis	March 10, 1975
5	"Lady Killer"	Unknown	S.S. Schweitzer & Anthony Spinner	March 17, 1975
6	"Flowers of Death"	Unknown	Larry Alexander	March 24, 1975
7	"Murder in Paradise"	Unknown	Carey Wilber	March 31, 1975
8	"School for Killers"	Unknown	Unknown	April 7, 1975
9	"One Second to Doom"	Unknown	Jackson Gillis	April 14, 1975
10	"The Patriots"	Unknown	Max Hodge & Robert I. Holt & Leigh Vance	April 21, 1975
11	"Counterfeit Killer"	Unknown	Unknown	April 28, 1975
12	"The Assassin"	Unknown	Stephen Kandel	May 5, 1975
13	"Assault on the Calavera"	Unknown	Unknown	May 12, 1975
