= Debbie Doesn't Do It Anymore =

2014 novel by Walter Mosley

Debbie Doesn't Do It Anymore is a 2014 novel by Walter Mosley. It was first published by Doubleday.

First edition

== Synopsis ==
In the aftermath of her husband's accidental death, Sandra Peel discovers that quitting the porn industry (where she had performed as "Debbie Dare") is more difficult than she had hoped.

== Reception ==
Booklist lauded it as "deeply affecting" and "daring and compelling", stating that it "could be the best thing Mosley has written in years", and positing that if the novel were to have been a movie produced in the early 1970s, Sandra would have been portrayed by Pam Grier. Kirkus Reviews found it to be "[a] well-told redemption song about the most unlikely of heroines", and observed that aside from "flashbacks and the novel's opening scene", Sandra — whom Mosley "treats with tremendous compassion" — does not have sex with anyone during the story.

Publishers Weekly considered Sandra/Debbie to be "among Mosley's best creations", with "a well-wrought first-person perspective and snap-tight dialogue" and an "impeccable voice", but faulted the novel itself as "shocking but ultimately flat" and "slow-paced, with an unsatisfying climax". The Boston Globe observed that Sandra/Debbie represented "a near total departure from [Mosley's] long-successful formula" of protagonists who are "flawed good guys who work as private investigators, either full time or as a sideline", but posited that Mosley's fans may nonetheless "adore" her, as — like most of Mosley's protagonists — she inspires "empathy" and realizes that her conscience is "too high a price to pay for money and power".

== Origins ==
Mosley has said that he wrote the novel after first thinking of the title (an allusion to the classic pornographic film Debbie Does Dallas), and that he had initially expected the novel would be "a comic story, because it's kind of a light title in a way. It's bouncy." He also specified that he did not research recent developments in the pornography industry, as he was "tired of these novels where people have done 15 years of research and it's 800 pages of description and details;" rather, he felt that authors should "just imagine a world, and the reader [accepts] it or not", and that what is truly important is "the psyche of people, the characters".

== Adaptations ==
In 2022, Broadcast reported that Jeff Wachtel's Future Shack Entertainment was developing a project based on Debbie Doesn't Do It Anymore.

== Cover art ==
The Chicago Tribune analyzed the novel's cover art, saying that "(t)he woman on the book jacket doesn't look real. Her black skin looks like hard plastic, her white hair too perfect (...) Her unnatural ocean-blue eyes, cherry-red lips and unusual cheek tattoo all suggest a robot or mannequin more than a human being", and suggested that this was representative of the fact that Sandra/Debbie (a Black woman with platinum blonde hair, blue contact lenses, and a facial tattoo) "hasn't felt alive for 15 years".
