= Nowhere to Run (1989 film) =

1989 film by Carl Franklin

- Theatrical release poster
- Directed by: Carl Franklin
- Written by: Jackson Barr; Nancy Barr
- Produced by: Julie Corman
- Starring: David Carradine; Jason Priestley; Jillian McWhirter; Kieran Mulroney; Henry Jones
- Cinematography: Phedon Papamichael
- Edited by: Carol Oblath
- Music by: Barry Goldberg
- Production company: Concorde Pictures
- Distributed by: Concorde Pictures
- Release date: 1989
- Running time: 86 minutes
- Country: United States
- Language: English

Nowhere to Run is a 1989 American thriller drama film directed by Carl Franklin (in his feature film directorial debut) and starring David Carradine and Jason Priestley.

== Plot ==
In rural Texas, 1960 — an age of good times and innocence, when growing up was supposed to be easy — six high school seniors know the terrible secret that will make the difference in the biggest election in the county's history. They must make the most difficult decision of their lives. They must become adults.

== Cast ==
- David Carradine as Harmon
- Jason Priestley as Howard
- Jillian McWhirter as Cynthia
- Kieran Mulroney as Jerry Lee
- Henry Jones as Judge Culbert
- Matt Adler as Don
- Brenda Bakke as Joannie
- Jocelyn Jones as Mrs. Tooley
- Harry Northup as Rayford Satterwhite
- Don Steele as Charlie Caddo
