= Full Fathom Five (film) =

1990 film by Carl Franklin

- Directed by: Carl Franklin
- Written by: Bart Davis
- Produced by: Rodman Flender
- Starring: Michael Moriarty; Maria Rangel; Diego Bertie
- Distributed by: Concorde Pictures
- Release date: September 7, 1990 (U.S.)
- Running time: 82 min
- Countries: Peru; United States
- Language: English

Full Fathom Five is a 1990 action film, written by Bart Davis and directed by Carl Franklin, starring Michael Moriarty, Maria Rangel, and Diego Bertie. It was shot in Peru.

== Plot ==
Full Fathom Five, based on the novel by Bart Davis, is set in the days preceding the United States invasion of Panama in 1989. USS Aspen, a fictional Los Angeles-class submarine, rescues agents from Panama, and Peter MacKenzie (Michael Moriarty), the submarine's commanding officer, promptly falls in love with the beautiful Justine (Maria Rangel). Meanwhile, Panamanian rebels seize a Soviet submarine (the "Victor Three class submarine CCCP Kirov") and threaten America with a nuclear attack on Houston, Texas. Only MacKenzie and his crew can stop the villains.

== Cast ==
- Michael Moriarty as McKenzie
- Todd Field as Johnson
- Michael Cavanaugh as Garvin
- Maria Rangel as Justine
- John Lafayette as Lasovic
- Orlando Sacha as Barrista
- Daniel Faraldo as Santillo
- Carl Franklin as Fletcher
