= Devil in a Blue Dress (film) =

1995 film by Carl Franklin

- Theatrical release poster
- Directed by: Carl Franklin
- Screenplay by: Carl Franklin
- Based on: Devil in a Blue Dress by Walter Mosley
- Produced by: Jesse Beaton; Gary Goetzman
- Starring: Denzel Washington; Tom Sizemore; Jennifer Beals; Don Cheadle; Maury Chaykin
- Cinematography: Tak Fujimoto
- Edited by: Carole Kravetz
- Music by: Elmer Bernstein
- Production company: TriStar Pictures
- Distributed by: Sony Pictures Releasing
- Release dates: September 16, 1995 (Toronto International Film Festival); September 29, 1995 (United States)
- Running time: 102 minutes
- Country: United States
- Language: English
- Budget: $22 million
- Box office: $22 million

Devil in a Blue Dress is a 1995 American neo-noir film written and directed by Carl Franklin, based on the 1990 novel Devil in a Blue Dress by Walter Mosley. The film stars Denzel Washington as a recently unemployed World War II veteran in postwar Los Angeles who accepts an assignment to locate a missing woman and soon becomes embroiled in criminal intrigue and political corruption. It also stars Tom Sizemore, Jennifer Beals, Don Cheadle, and Maury Chaykin.

Devil in a Blue Dress received positive reviews, with many praising Cheadle's performance.

== Plot ==
In the Summer of 1948 in Los Angeles, Ezekiel "Easy" Rawlins is laid off from his job at Champion Aircraft and needs money to pay his mortgage. Easy's bartender friend Joppy introduces him to DeWitt Albright, a white private investigator looking for a missing white woman, Daphne Monet. Before meeting, Easy feels a little nervous meeting DeWitt, as it reminds him of someone from his past back in Houston, Mouse, a man who got him to go along with a murder, which Easy denies he was a part of, and car theft. Explaining that Monet's disappearance led her wealthy fiancé, Todd Carter, to drop out of the Los Angeles mayoral race, Albright pays Easy to find Daphne, who is known to frequent the juke joints along Central Avenue.

Easy begins his search at an illegal club where he sees the bouncer, Junior Fornay, eject a white man. Learning that his friend Dupree Brouchard's girlfriend, Coretta James, is a confidant of Daphne, Easy spends the night with Coretta, who tells him Daphne is staying with gangster Frank Green. Albright arranges a meeting at the Malibu pier, where Easy is accosted by racist white youths before Albright humiliates one of the boys at gunpoint and drives off the others. Easy tells Albright about Green and is given another payment to continue the search.

Returning home, Easy is arrested by LAPD homicide detectives, who reveal that Coretta has been murdered. Interrogated and beaten before being released, he is approached by Matthew Terell, the remaining mayoral candidate. Terell is with a young boy, supposedly his adopted son, and inquires about Daphne, but Easy divulges nothing. After a nightmare about Coretta, he receives a call from Daphne herself. They meet at the Ambassador Hotel; Daphne says Coretta called her before she died and confirms she is close with Frank Green. Daphne then asks Easy to drive her to meet Richard McGee (the white man ejected from the club), who delivered a letter of hers to the wrong place. They arrive to find McGee dead and his house ransacked. Easy notices a pack of Mexican cigarettes, the same brand smoked by Junior. Traumatized by the grisly scene, Daphne panics and flees in McGee's car.

Easy drives home, where he is threatened again by Albright and his thugs, who demand that Easy track down Daphne or they will finger him for Coretta's murder. Easy sends for his old friend, Raymond 'Mouse' Alexander, and confronts Joppy for leading Daphne to him. He meets with Carter and secures another payment to locate Daphne. Carter doesn't know Albright; Easy realizes that Albright is actually working for Terell. From there, he goes to a bar where he knows Frank Green sells stolen liquor, but nobody knows who he is. Returning home, he is ambushed by Frank Green but rescued by Mouse. Frank escapes after the trigger-happy Mouse shoots him in the shoulder, and Easy misses a call from Daphne. Questioned again by the detectives, who found a note with Coretta's name on it in McGee's pocket, they accuse Easy of double homicide and give him until the following morning to clear his name.

Easy and Mouse confront Junior – the owner of the cigarettes – who admits to driving McGee home and taking a letter from him to Coretta to deliver to Daphne but denies killing him. They visit Dupree in Compton where, inside Coretta's Bible, Easy finds the contents of a letter and incriminating photographs of Terell with naked children. Easy deduces that McGee sold the pictures to Daphne and that Albright had killed McGee trying to get the pictures back. At home, Easy finds Daphne waiting, and she reveals that Frank is her half-brother: their mother was Creole, and Daphne's father was white, but Frank's was Black. Terell learned of Daphne's heritage, and the potential scandal forced Carter to abandon his campaign, but Daphne bought the pictures from McGee to blackmail Terell into silence. When Coretta threatened to sell the pictures to Terell, Daphne sent Joppy to intimidate her, but she did not expect him to kill Coretta.

Albright and his men arrive, subduing Easy and kidnapping Daphne. Joined by Mouse, Easy abducts Joppy at gunpoint, forcing him to take them to Albright's cabin in Malibu. Easy and Mouse kill Albright and his men and rescue Daphne; returning to the car, Easy learns Mouse killed Joppy for being a liability. Daphne pays Easy and Mouse $7,000 for the pictures, and Mouse returns home to Houston with his share. Daphne reveals that Carter's family paid her $30,000 to leave town, but she believes that the pictures will ensure Carter's victory and their marriage. Driving Daphne to meet Carter, who rejects her, Easy receives the rest of his payment in exchange for the pictures. Daphne and her brother leave town, while Carter's election is assured. No longer in trouble with the police, Easy considers starting his own business as a private investigator himself.

== Cast ==
- Denzel Washington as Easy Rawlins
- Tom Sizemore as DeWitt Albright
- Jennifer Beals as Daphne Monet
- Don Cheadle as Mouse
- Maury Chaykin as Matthew Terell
- Joseph Latimore as Frank Green
- Terry Kinney as Todd Carter
- Mel Winkler as Joppy
- Albert Hall as Odell
- Lisa Nicole Carson as Coretta James
- Jernard Burks as Dupree Brouchard
- David Wolos-Fonteno as Junior Fornay
- Beau Starr as Miller, LAPD
- John Roselius as Mason, LAPD
- Nicky Corell as Shariff

== Production ==
=== Development ===
Carl Franklin wrote and directed the neo-noir because he liked the novel by Walter Mosley, who in turn served as an associate producer on the film. Franklin thought the work was more than a detective story; he said that Mosley was able to transform an everyday guy into a detective. In the editing process, Franklin had to cut a steamy love scene between Beals and Washington because he believed the scene was not needed to convey the story.

Don Cheadle originally did not want to audition for Mouse because he thought he was too young for the role.

=== Locations ===
The film was shot mostly in Los Angeles, California. The pier shot where Easy Rawlins gets in trouble with local youths was filmed at the Malibu, California pier. Other locales in Los Angeles include the Griffith Park Observatory and the famed Ambassador Hotel on Wilshire Boulevard.

== Release ==
Devil in a Blue Dress premiered at the Toronto International Film Festival on September 16, 1995. In the United States, it opened in wide release on September 29, 1995. In its widest release the film was featured in 1,432 theaters across the country.

Devil in a Blue Dress was released on VHS in April 1996, and then on laserdisc in June. A DVD version was released in 1999. Twilight Time released on the film on Blu-ray on 2015. The Criterion Collection re-released the film in 2022 on 4K Ultra HD Blu-Ray and Blu-Ray with a new restoration.

== Reception ==
=== Critical response ===
Kenneth Turan, film critic for the Los Angeles Times and NPR, liked the film, and wrote: "Hard-boiled fiction is a been-around genre about done-that individuals, so the pleasant air of newness and excitement that Devil in a Blue Dress gives off isn't due to its familiar find-the-girl plot. Rather it's the film's glowing visual qualities, a striking performance by Denzel Washington and the elegant control Carl Franklin has over it all that create the most exotic crime entertainment of the season." Roger Ebert, writing for the Chicago Sun-Times, did not like the story much but enjoyed the look and tone of the film: "I liked the movie without quite being caught up in it: I liked the period, tone and look more than the story, which I never really cared much about. The explanation, when it comes, tidies all the loose ends, but you're aware it's arbitrary – an elegant solution to a chess problem, rather than a necessary outcome of guilt and passion." In a positive film review, critic James Berardinelli discussed Devil in a Blue Dress from a sociological viewpoint, especially one involving the 1990s. He concludes, "The most interesting element of Devil in a Blue Dress is not the whodunit, but the 'whydunit.' Finding the guilty parties isn't as involving as learning their motivation, which is buried in society's perception of racial interaction. By uncovering the truth behind this mystery, Franklin illustrates that some attitudes have indeed changed for the better over the last forty years."

Many critics applauded Don Cheadle's performance, for which he won multiple awards. Jerry Renshaw said, "Cheadle steals every scene where he appears as Mouse ..." but he was disappointed by Beals' performance. In Variety, film critic Todd McCarthy wrote, "Entering the main flow of the story relatively late, Don Cheadle steals all his scenes as a live-wire, trigger-happy old buddy of Easy’s from Texas, while Sizemore and Mel Winkler, as colorful underworld figures, make strong impressions."

Review aggregator Rotten Tomatoes would later rate Devil in a Blue Dress at an approval of 92% based on reviews from 123 critics, with an average score of 8.8/10. The website's critical consensus reads: "Humor, interesting characters, and attention to details make the stylish Devil in a Blue Dress an above average noir." On Metacritic the film would achieve a score of 78 out of 100, based on reviews from 21 critics, indicating a "generally favorable" reception. Audiences surveyed by CinemaScore gave the film a grade A− on scale of A to F.

=== Box office ===
The first week's gross was $5,422,385 from 1,432 screens and the total receipts in the United States and Canada were $16,004,418. The film grossed $22 million worldwide against a budget of $22 million, according to the director Carl Franklin (in his audio commentary to the film's home video releases).

=== Accolades ===
Wins

- Los Angeles Film Critics Association Awards: LAFCA Award; Best Supporting Actor, Don Cheadle; 1995.
- National Society of Film Critics Awards: NSFC Award; Best Cinematography, Tak Fujimoto; Best Supporting Actor, Don Cheadle; 1996.

Nominated

- San Sebastián International Film Festival: Golden Seashell Award, Carl Franklin; 1995.
- Edgar Allan Poe Award: Best Motion Picture, Carl Franklin; 1996.
- Image Awards: Image Award; Outstanding Lead Actress in a Motion Picture, Jennifer Beals; Outstanding Motion Picture; Outstanding Soundtrack Album; Outstanding Supporting Actor in a Motion Picture, Don Cheadle; 1996.
- Screen Actors Guild Awards: Outstanding Performance by a Male Actor in a Supporting Role, Don Cheadle; 1996.

Others

In 2008, the American Film Institute nominated Devil in a Blue Dress for its Top 10 Mystery Films list.

== Music ==
The original score for the film was written and recorded by Elmer Bernstein. The original music soundtrack was released on September 12, 1995, by Sony. The CD included 14 tracks, three of them written by Bernstein (theme, etc.).

1. "West Side Baby" - T-Bone Walker
2. "Ain't Nobody's Business" - Jimmy Witherspoon
3. "Hy-Ah-Su" - Duke Ellington
4. "Hop Skip And Jump" - Roy Milton
5. "Good Rockin' Tonight" - Wynonie Harris
6. "Blues After Hours" - Pee Wee Crayton
7. "I Can't Go On Without You" - Bull Moose Jackson
8. "'Round Midnight" - Thelonious Monk
9. "Chicken Shack Boogie" - Amos Milburn
10. "Messin' Around" - Memphis Slim
11. "Chica Boo" - Lloyd Glenn
12. "Theme From 'Devil In A Blue Dress'" - Elmer Bernstein
13. "Malibu Chase" - Elmer Bernstein
14. "End Credits" - Elmer Bernstein

== See also ==
- List of films featuring home invasions
