= May I Trim Your Hedges? =

- Shameless episode
- Episode no.: Season 3 Episode 3
- Directed by: Steve Shill
- Written by: Krista Vernoff
- Cinematography by: Rodney Charters
- Editing by: Regis Kimble
- Production code: 2J6603
- Original release date: January 27, 2013
- Running time: 53 minutes

Guest appearances
- Joan Cusack as Sheila Jackson; Harry Hamlin as Lloyd Lishman; Stephanie Fantauzzi as Estefania; Eric Edelstein as Bobby Mallison; Bernardo de Paula as Beto; Cameron Richardson as Cheryl; Justine Lupe as Blake Collins; C.J. Berdahl as Kyle; Dennis Cockrum as Terry Milkovich; Lauri Johnson as Make-A-Wish Administrator; Melissa De Sousa as Tina; J. Michael Trautmann as Iggy Milkovich

Episode chronology
← Previous "The American Dream"	Next → "The Helpful Gallaghers"
- Shameless season 3

"May I Trim Your Hedges?" is the third episode of the third season of the American television comedy drama Shameless, an adaptation of the British series of the same name. It is the 27th overall episode of the series and was written by co-executive producer Krista Vernoff, and directed by Steve Shill. It originally aired on Showtime on January 27, 2013.

The series is set on the South Side of Chicago, Illinois, and depicts the poor, dysfunctional family of Frank Gallagher, a neglectful single father of six: Fiona, Phillip, Ian, Debbie, Carl, and Liam. He spends his days drunk, high, or in search of money, while his children need to learn to take care of themselves. In the episode, Debbie and Fiona experience sexual harassment, while Frank tries to use Hymie and Carl for a new scheme.

According to Nielsen Media Research, the episode was seen by an estimated 1.99 million household viewers and gained a 1.0 ratings share among adults aged 18–49. The episode received highly positive reviews from critics, who praised the series' handling of its themes.

== Plot ==
At a store, Debbie (Emma Kenney) tries to cash some coupons, and her conversation causes the cashier to quit. Fiona (Emmy Rossum) seizes the opportunity to ask the manager, Bobby (Eric Edelstein), for a job. However, Fiona is disgusted when he makes sexual advances towards her. Veronica (Shanola Hampton) helps Fiona by getting an incriminating tape of Bobby's sexual harassment, allowing Fiona to blackmail him into giving her a job. On the bus, Fiona discovers a man masturbating while staring at Debbie; she angrily kicks him out and consoles a shaken Debbie.

Frank (William H. Macy) helps Sheila (Joan Cusack) with Hymie, claiming he will take him to get a vaccine. However, Frank instead takes him to the Alibi Room, where Kate (Kerry O'Malley) is disgusted by his treatment of the baby. Seeing a news report of a child with cancer getting to meet the Chicago Bulls team, Frank decides to take Hymie to the agency to get an autographed basketball to sell. However, Frank is informed that the agency only tends to dying children. Later, Frank tells Carl (Ethan Cutkosky) that he has been diagnosed with cancer and makes him shave his head. Upon bringing Carl into the agency, the employee explains that the process may take a year; instead, she invites Carl to join their upcoming summer camp for children with cancer.

After discovering Debbie's experience, Lip (Jeremy Allen White) and Ian (Cameron Monaghan) discover that their neighborhood is home to a registered sex offender named Blake Collins. They team up a few neighbors, including Mickey (Noel Fisher) to assault Blake, but they are shocked to discover that Blake is actually a woman (Justine Lupe) who seduced her student and served prison time. The neighbors decide not to go forward, with Mickey even claiming he would've allowed the teacher's advances, but Lip is unwilling to let her stay. He offers himself to work as her gardener and gets her to kiss him on the lips. Lip, however, feels satisfaction when Blake uses peanut butter to shave his crotch. He later tries the trick on Mandy (Emma Greenwell), who walks out upon learning of his scheme. Upon learning that Ian is sleeping with Lloyd (Harry Hamlin), Mickey publicly beats him. He runs off with Ian, and while the latter is surprised, he also feels ecstatic.

Jimmy (Justin Chatwin) spends time with Estefania (Stephanie Fantauzzi) creating false wedding photos in order to protect her from immigration services. Afterwards, Estefania initiates a sexual encounter with Jimmy, shocking him. Kevin's wife, Cheryl (Cameron Richardson), is trying to get him back by pretending her sister's child is hers and his. When Veronica finds out, she fights with Cheryl and forces her to sign the divorce papers. That night, Mandy scares Blake into moving out of the neighborhood by tricking her into thinking her brothers are preparing her grave.

== Production ==
=== Development ===
The episode was written by co-executive producer Krista Vernoff, and directed by Steve Shill. It was Vernoff's first writing credit, and Shill's first directing credit.

== Reception ==
=== Viewers ===
In its original American broadcast, "May I Trim Your Hedges?" was seen by an estimated 1.99 million household viewers with a 1.0 in the 18–49 demographics. This means that 1 percent of all households with televisions watched the episode. This was a 45% increase in viewership from the previous episode, which was seen by an estimated 1.37 million household viewers with a 0.7 in the 18–49 demographics.

=== Critical reviews ===
"May I Trim Your Hedges?" received highly positive reviews from critics. Joshua Alston of The A.V. Club gave the episode a "B+" grade, praising the writing and directing, and calling it "the best episode of the third season to date, because it delivers enough great moments to make up for those that left me wanting. It was also the first episode that left me excited to see what happens next, which tells me a bit of momentum is growing." Alston also praised the Kevin and Veronica subplot, commending the storyline's balance between comedy and drama: "That sequence was Shameless at its finest, when the show's earnest instincts and its tendency towards shock humor blend seamlessly rather than feeling messily soldered together."

Alan Sepinwall's review for HitFix was highly positive, praising the storylines as well as the episode's overall balance of comedy and drama, writing "If “Shameless” wanted to function just on the level of a sick joke, it would still be wildly entertaining. But what makes the show special – and what's made these early episodes of the new season feel particularly strong – is the way it marries the twisted comedy to some genuine emotion. [...] That Shameless can shift seamlessly between those two moods is damned impressive."

David Crow of Den of Geek praised the delicate handling of the episode's sexual themes and content: "This week’s show is hands down the most irreverent and entertaining Shameless has been in a while. It constructs many subplots, even a few I didn’t detail, into one quirky tale of sex and double standards. [...] The whole episode handles the questions of sexuality from the young pre-pubescent on through failed marriages and does so with a sly wink and a middle finger." Leigh Raines of TV Fanatic gave the episode a 4.5 star rating out of 5 and particularly highlighted Frank's storyline: "It's amazing that in an episode with pedophiles, multiple perverts, crazy lying ex-wives and a violent homophobic teen, that Frank still manages to outshine everyone with his despicable behavior."
