= Always Outnumbered, Always Outgunned =

1997 crime novel by Walter Mosley

- First edition
- Author: Walter Mosley
- Language: English
- Series: Socrates Fortlow
- Genre: Crime fiction
- Publisher: W. W. Norton & Company
- Publication date: 24 October 1997
- Publication place: United States
- Media type: Print (Hardcover)
- Pages: 208 pages
- ISBN: 978-0-393-04539-0
- OCLC: 36165270
- Dewey Decimal: 813/.54 21
- LC Class: PS3563.O88456 A79 1998
- Followed by: Walkin' the Dog

Always Outnumbered, Always Outgunned is a 1997 crime novel by Walter Mosley.

== Plot summary ==
Ex-convict Socrates Fortlow lives in Watts, a tough Los Angeles neighborhood, and struggles to stay on the path of righteousness. He befriends Darryl, a young boy who initially dislikes Socrates but grows to appreciate his mentorship. He counsels Corrina, a pretty 23-year-old who works and wants to keep her husband, who has no job. He counsels her husband, Howard, to step up or risk losing Corrina. After a few trials and tribulations, Socrates lands a job at a supermarket further on the west side of Los Angeles. He helps Darryl again as he stands up against gang members, and tries to make up for his past misdeeds by reaching out to an old flame.

Socrates finds himself in jail, having hit a man who struck a dog with his car and wanted to finish off the dog. Socrates carries the dog to a local vet, who later posts his bail. Through his savvy public defender, Socrates gets a suspended sentence. At the end of the novel Socrates does his final good deed, helping his friend, suffering from terminal cancer, find enough pain medication to end his own life.

== Film, television or theatrical adaptations ==
- Always Outnumbered – 1998 television movie directed by Michael Apted, starring Laurence Fishburne as Socrates.
