= Maximum Fantastic Four =

First edition (publ. Marvel Comics)

Maximum Fantastic Four is a 224-page coffee table art book focused on the art of Jack Kirby in 1961's Fantastic Four #1. The project was conceived and orchestrated by Walter Mosley. It has been reprinted numerous times.
