= The Helpful Gallaghers =

- Shameless episode
- Episode no.: Season 3 Episode 4
- Directed by: Randall Einhorn
- Written by: Mike O'Malley
- Cinematography by: Rodney Charters
- Editing by: Gregg Featherman
- Production code: 2J6604
- Original release date: February 10, 2013
- Running time: 51 minutes

Guest appearances
- Joan Cusack as Sheila Jackson; Harry Hamlin as Lloyd Lishman; Eric Edelstein as Bobby Mallison; Madison Rothschild as Molly; Galadriel Stineman as Wendy; Charles Henry Wyson as Hanley; Julie Ariola as Patty; J.J. Boone as Jenica; Sally Brooks as Lucy; Ellen Gerstein as Aunt Rande; Roberta Valderrama as Princess

Episode chronology
← Previous "May I Trim Your Hedges?"	Next → "The Sins of My Caretaker"
- Shameless season 3

"The Helpful Gallaghers" is the fourth episode of the third season of the American television comedy drama Shameless, an adaptation of the British series of the same name. It is the 28th overall episode of the series and was written by consulting producer Mike O'Malley, and directed by Randall Einhorn. It originally aired on Showtime on February 10, 2013.

The series is set on the South Side of Chicago, Illinois, and depicts the poor, dysfunctional family of Frank Gallagher, a neglectful single father of six: Fiona, Phillip, Ian, Debbie, Carl, and Liam. He spends his days drunk, high, or in search of money, while his children need to learn to take care of themselves. In the episode, Lip and Mandy go to get her half-sister, while Fiona tries to change the status quo at the grocery store.

According to Nielsen Media Research, the episode was seen by an estimated 1.53 million household viewers and gained a 0.7 ratings share among adults aged 18–49. The episode received critical acclaim, with critics praising its dark humor, pacing and storylines.

== Plot ==
While having sex with Lip (Jeremy Allen White), Mandy (Emma Greenwell) receives a message from her half-sister, Molly, who states her mother died. Mandy wants her to go to the foster care system, but is convinced by Lip that she must take care of her and they decide to drive to Milwaukee.

As part of making him believe he has cancer, Frank (William H. Macy) sends Carl (Ethan Cutkosky) to a camp with other kids diagnosed with cancer. Carl is bored with the camp's activities and unable to get what he wants, but establishes a friendship with a kid named Hanley (Charles Henry Wyson). Wanting to help him see breasts, they sneak at night to steal pills, only to be discovered by the camp counselor, Wendy (Galadriel Stineman). They convince her in showing her breasts, but she is caught by her co-workers. Fiona (Emmy Rossum) starts working at the grocery store, only to discover that the rest of the employees willingly accept Bobby (Eric Edelstein) as their boss, as he gives them benefits for sexual advances. She decides to host a meeting at the house, where it initially gets support from the other employees, but it ends with most of them voting to keep it as it was.

Sheila (Joan Cusack) starts to feel unsatisfied in her sexual life with Jody (Zach McGowan), as the latter refuses to get involved with her dominatrix style and use of sex toys. She asks Frank to help him convince Jody in changing his mind. Jody explains that part of his Sex Addicts Anonymous program, he wants to reduce the amount of sex he had, but agrees to try it for Sheila if Frank helps him as his coach. In Milwaukee, Lip and Mandy discover that Molly has no close relatives, and they decide to take her in temporarily. Lip gets Molly to stay with him at the house, where Debbie (Emma Kenney) is shocked to realize that Molly is transgender.

While helping Fiona with the savings, Jimmy (Justin Chatwin) is called by Lloyd (Harry Hamlin) to meet at a bar. There, Lloyd reveals he and his wife are getting divorced, but does not disclose what was the reason. As Lloyd gets drunk, Jimmy allows him to stay in the house. Later, a naked Lloyd tries to jump into the bed with Ian (Cameron Monaghan), but accidentally touches Lip instead. Ian is forced to reveal his relationship with Lloyd, forcing Jimmy to deal with his father's sexuality. Lloyd decides to stay the night at a hotel, while Fiona consoles Jimmy.

== Production ==
=== Development ===
The episode was written by consulting producer Mike O'Malley, and directed by Randall Einhorn. It was O'Malley's fourth writing credit, and Einhorn's first directing credit.

== Reception ==
=== Viewers ===
In its original American broadcast, "The Helpful Gallaghers" was seen by an estimated 1.53 million household viewers with a 0.7 in the 18–49 demographics. This means that 0.7 percent of all households with televisions watched the episode. This was a 24% decrease in viewership from the previous episode, which was seen by an estimated 1.99 million household viewers with a 1.0 in the 18–49 demographics.

=== Critical reviews ===
"The Helpful Gallaghers" received critical acclaim. Joshua Alston of The A.V. Club gave the episode an "A–" grade, praising writer Mike O'Malley for the episode's script, writing "Even in the best of outcomes, there are some writers that grasp a show or some of its characters better than others. In the case of Shameless, that writer is Mike O'Malley. O'Malley's name is one of two that surprisingly popped up in the writing credits during season one, and "The Helpful Gallaghers" demonstrates how firmly O'Malley grasps the Shameless voice at its best." Alston gave particular praise towards Frank, Sheila and Jody's subplot, commenting highly on Macy's performance and the exploration of Sheila and Jody's characters: "I found myself gradually sold as it morphed into a pretty compelling and interesting depiction of a character’s sexuality and what it says about that character, something Shameless tends to do well."

John Vilanova of Paste gave the episode an 8.5 out of 10 rating, praising the episode's realistic and dramatic storylines, writing "In spite of its usual absurdity, which was for the most part kept in check this episode, the show’s strength has always been its unflinching willingness to grapple with the realities the urban poor confront." David Crow of Den of Geek also praised the delicate handling of the episode's dramatic content: "This was a strangely sincere episode of Shameless. There were laughs to be had, [yet] on the whole, it’s a more earnest look at how awful life is for the desperately poor in this country. [...] The tone was far more somber and less mean spirited than usual." Leigh Raines of TV Fanatic gave the episode a 4 star rating out of 5.
