= Laurel Avenue =

- Teleplay by: Michael Henry Brown
- Story by: Paul Aaron; Michael Henry Brown
- Directed by: Carl Franklin
- Starring: Mary Alice; Jay Brooks; Juanita Jennings; Scott Lawrence; Dan Martin; Monté Russell; Ondrea Shallbetter; Rhonda Stubbins White; Vonte Sweet; Gay Thomas; Malinda Williams; Mel Winkler
- Country of origin: United States
- Original language: English

Production
- Executive producers: Paul Aaron; Charles S. Dutton
- Running time: 180 minutes
- Production companies: HBO Independent Productions; Elsboy Entertainment

Original release
- Network: HBO
- Release: July 10 – July 11, 1993

Laurel Avenue is an American three-hour television miniseries which aired on HBO on July 10 and 11, 1993. It is the story of an eventful weekend in the lives of an extended African American family living in St. Paul, Minnesota. Paul Aaron and actor Charles S. Dutton served as executive producers. The teleplay was written by Michael Henry Brown, based upon a story by Aaron and Brown. The miniseries was directed by Carl Franklin.

== Cast ==
- Mary Alice as Maggie Arnett
- Jay Brooks as Uncle Otis Arnett
- Juanita Jennings as Yolanda Arnett-Friedman
- Scott Lawrence as Keith Arnett
- Dan Martin as Woodrow Arnett
- Monté Russell as Marcus Arnett
- Ondrea Shallbetter as Shanequa Arnett
- Rhonda Stubbins White as Rolanda Arnett
- Vonte Sweet as Rushan Arnett
- Gay Thomas as Kathleen Arnett
- Malinda Williams as Sheila Arnett
- Mel Winkler as Jake Arnett
- Gary Dourdan as Anthony
- Michael Tezla as Howard Friedman
- Ulysses Zackery as Fletcher

== Video releases ==
On July 10, 2001, the miniseries was released on VHS. However, it has yet to be released on DVD or any other digital video format.
