= Gray Dawn (novel) =

2025 novel by Walter Mosley

- First edition hardcover
- Author: Walter Mosley
- Language: English
- Series: Easy Rawlins
- Release number: 17th in series
- Genre: Detective novel; historical mystery
- Publisher: Grand Central Publishing
- Publication date: September 16, 2025
- Publication place: United States
- Pages: 336
- ISBN: 9780316573238
- Preceded by: Farewell, Amethystine

Gray Dawn is a detective novel by American author Walter Mosley. It is the 17th novel in the Easy Rawlins series. It was published on September 16, 2025 by Grand Central Publishing.

== Synopsis ==
In 1971 Los Angeles, 52-year-old African American private detective Ezekiel "Easy" Rawlins is now head of his own detective agency. When he is asked by Santangelo Burris to find his aunt, Lutisha James, he takes the job, despite it having been over a year since his last case. This leads him to Bel Air, where she had been a domestic worker, where he discovers three murder victims and a nine-year-old survivor. After being arrested at another murder scene, he agrees to help an inmate at the county jail find his father. Upon his release, he tracks down Lutisha.

== Reception ==
The audiobook, narrated by Michael Boatman and Walter Mosley, was nominated for an Audie Award for Mystery.

Kirkus Reviews praised the novel's "inimitable blend of taut lyricism and evocative landscapes". Publishers Weekly called the novel's plot "a little more contrived than usual", but praised its "stirring prose" and "vivid evocation" of 1970s Los Angeles and called Easy "as charming as ever." In his review of the novel for The Wall Street Journal, Tom Nolan wrote that "seeing how Easy’s tolerance and understanding mature" was one of the series' "many pleasures".
