= Walter Mosley =

American novelist (born 1952)

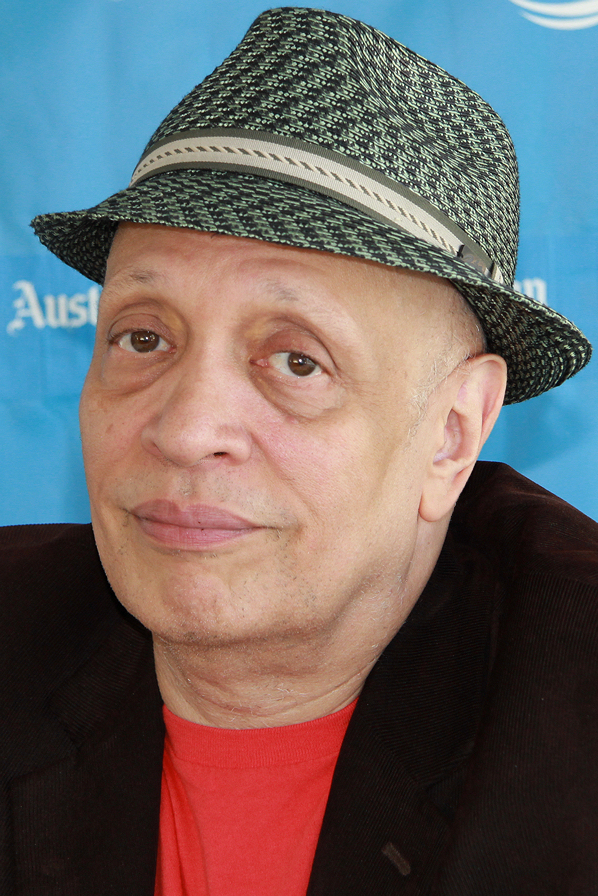
- Mosley at the 2014 Texas Book Festival
- Born: Walter Ellis Mosley; January 12, 1952 (age 74); Los Angeles, California, U.S.
- Education: Johnson State College (BA)
- Occupation: Novelist
- Notable work: Devil in a Blue Dress (1990)
- Spouse: Joy Kellman (m. 1987; div. 2001)
- Awards: National Book Foundation Medal for Distinguished Contribution to American Letters; Diamond Dagger, 2023
- Website: waltermosley.com

Walter Ellis Mosley (born January 12, 1952) is an American novelist, most widely recognized for his crime fiction. He has written a series of best-selling historical mysteries featuring the hardboiled detective Easy Rawlins, a private investigator living in the Watts neighborhood of Los Angeles, California. In 2020, Mosley received the National Book Foundation Medal for Distinguished Contribution to American Letters, making him the first Black man to receive the honor.

== Personal life ==
Mosley was born in Los Angeles, California. His mother, Ella (née Slatkin), was Jewish and worked as a personnel clerk. Her ancestors had immigrated from Russia. His father, Leroy Mosley (1916–1993), was an African American from Louisiana who was a supervising custodian at a Los Angeles public school. He had worked as a clerk in the segregated US army during the Second World War. His parents tried to marry in 1951, and while the union was legal in California, where they were living, no one would give them a marriage license.

Mosley was an only child. For $9.50 a week, he attended the Victory Baptist day school, a private African-American elementary school that held classes in black history. When he was 12, his parents moved from South Central to West LA. He graduated from Alexander Hamilton High School, in 1970. Mosley describes his father as a deep thinker and storyteller, and his mother encouraged him to read European classics, including Dickens, Zola and Camus. He also loved Langston Hughes and Gabriel García Márquez. He was largely raised in a non-political family culture, although there were racial conflicts flaring throughout L.A. at the time. He later became more politicized and outspoken about racial inequalities in the US, which provide context for much of his fiction.

Mosley went through a "hippie" phase, traveling around Santa Cruz and Europe. He dropped out of Goddard College, a liberal arts college in Plainfield, Vermont, and then earned a political science degree at Johnson State College. Abandoning a doctorate in political theory, he started work programming computers. He moved to New York in 1981, and met dancer and choreographer Joy Kellman, whom he married in 1987. Kellman was also Jewish. They separated ten years later, and were divorced in 2001. While working for Mobil Oil, Mosley took a writing course at City College in Harlem, after being inspired by Alice Walker's book The Color Purple. One of his tutors there, Irish writer Edna O'Brien, became a mentor and encouraged his writing.

Mosley still resides in New York City. He identifies as both African-American and Jewish.

== Career ==
Mosley started writing at 34 and has penned more than forty books, often publishing two books a year. He has written in a variety of fiction categories, including mystery and afrofuturist science fiction, as well as nonfiction politics. His work has been translated into 21 languages. His direct inspirations include the detective fiction of Dashiell Hammett, Graham Greene and Raymond Chandler. Mosley's fame increased in 1992 when presidential candidate Bill Clinton named Mosley as one of his favorite authors.

Mosley's first published book, Devil in a Blue Dress, was the basis of a 1995 movie starring Denzel Washington, and the following year, a 10-part abridgement of the novel by Margaret Busby, read by Paul Winfield, was broadcast on BBC Radio 4. The world premiere of Mosley's first play, The Fall of Heaven, was staged at the Playhouse in the Park, Cincinnati, Ohio, in January 2010. In 1997, Mosley forwent an advance to give the manuscript of Gone Fishin' to a small independent publisher, Black Classic Press in Baltimore.

Mosley has served on the board of directors of the National Book Awards. He is on the board of the TransAfrica Forum.

In 2019, after working in the writers' room for the television series Snowfall, Mosley was hired by Alex Kurtzman for a similar role on the third season of Star Trek: Discovery. After working on the series for three weeks, Mosley was notified by CBS of a complaint made against him by another member of the writers room for Mosley's use of the word "nigger", while telling a story about his experience with a police officer who had used the slur. CBS told Mosley this was usually a fireable offence but said no further action would be taken and asked that he not use the word, again, outside of a script. Mosley chose to leave the series and explained his decision in an op-ed for The New York Times in September 2019. He did not identify Discovery as the series he was working on in the op-ed, but this was confirmed in reports shortly after its release.

Former literature professor Harold Heft argued for Mosley's inclusion in the literary canon of Jewish-American writers. In Moment magazine, Johanna Neuman writes that Black literary circles questioned whether Mosley should be considered a "Black author". Mosley has said that he prefers to be called a novelist. He explained his desire to write about "black male heroes", saying "hardly anybody in America has written about black male heroes. There are black male protagonists and black male supporting characters, but nobody else writes about black male heroes."

== Awards and honors ==
- 1996 – Black Caucus of the American Library Association's Literary Award for RL's Dream
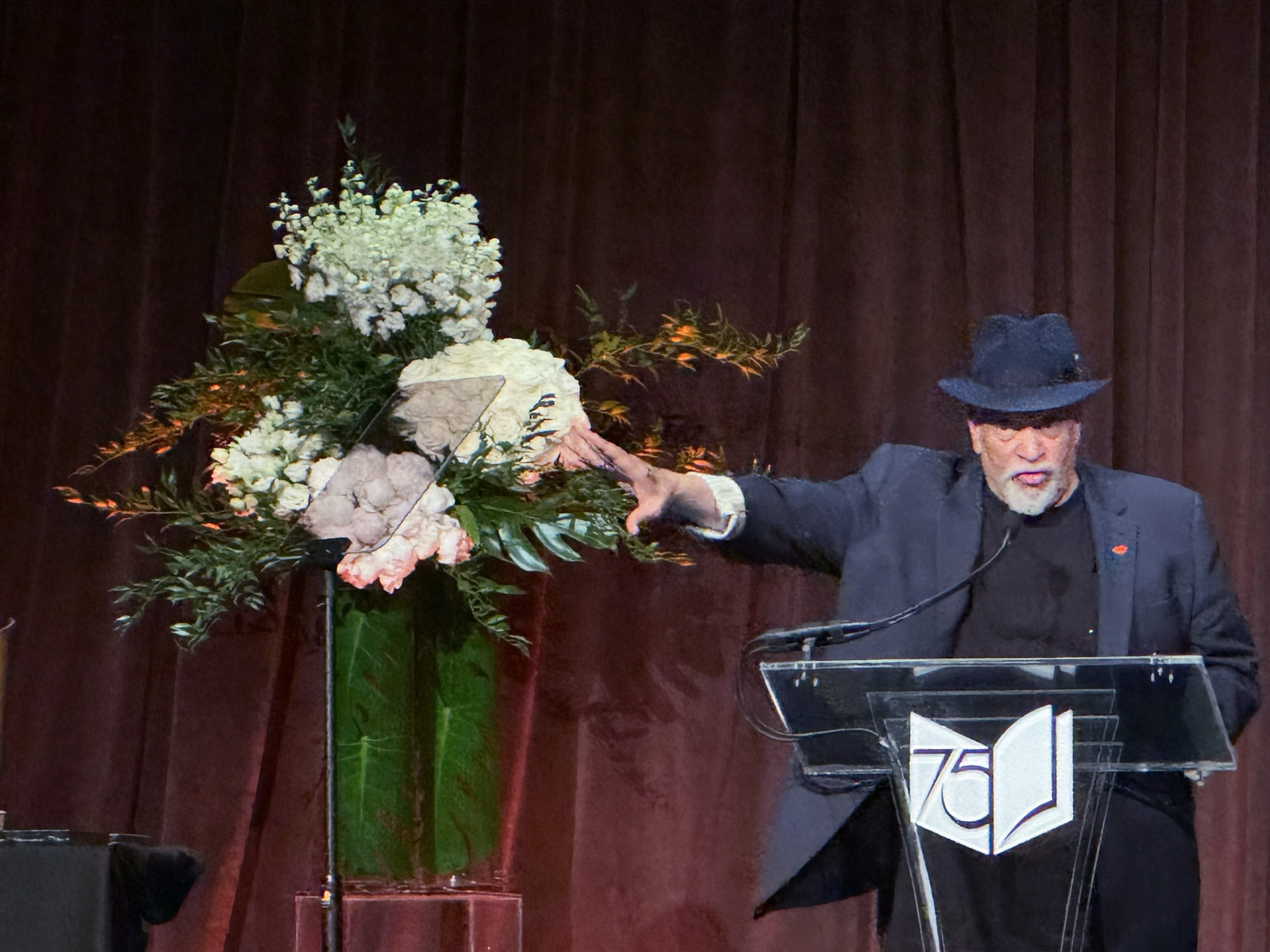
  Mosley at the 2024 National Book Awards, introducing Paul Coates
- 1996 – O. Henry Award for a Socrates Fortlow short story
- 1998 – Anisfield-Wolf Book Award for Always Outnumbered, Always Outgunned
- 2001 – Grammy Award for Best Album Notes for Richard Pryor's …And It's Deep Too!
- 2004 – Honorary doctorate from the City College of New York
- 2005 – Risktaker Award from the Sundance Institute
- 2006 – Carl Brandon Society Parallax Award for 47
- 2007 – NAACP Image Award for Outstanding Literary Work of Fiction for Blonde Faith
- 2009 – NAACP Image Award for Outstanding Literary Work of Fiction for The Long Fall
- 2013 – Induction into the New York State Writers Hall of Fame
- 2014 – NAACP Image Award for Outstanding Literary Work of Fiction nomination for Little Green
- 2014 – Langston Hughes Medal from the City College of New York
- 2016 – Grand Master Award from the Mystery Writers of America
- 2019 – Edgar Award for Best Novel for Down the River Unto the Sea
- 2019 – Robert Kirsch Award for Lifetime Achievement
- 2020 – National Book Foundation Medal for Distinguished Contribution to American Letters
- 2021 – NAACP Image Award for Outstanding Literary Work of Fiction for The Awkward Black Man
- 2023 – Diamond Dagger from the Crime Writers' Association

== Works ==
External videos
- Presentation by Mosley on Gone Fishin', January 15, 1997, C-SPAN
- Booknotes interview with Mosley on Workin' on the Chain Gang, April 23, 2000, C-SPAN
- Discussion with Mosley and Harry Belafonte on Life Out of Context, February 17, 2006, C-SPAN
- Interview with Mosley on Twelve Steps Toward Political Revelation, May 1, 2011, C-SPAN

=== Non-series novels ===
- RL's Dream (1995)
- Blue Light (1998)
- Futureland: Nine Stories of an Imminent World (2001)
- The Man in My Basement (2004)
- Walking the Line (2005), a novella in the Transgressions series
- 47 (2005)
- The Wave (2006)
- Fortunate Son (2006)
- Killing Johnny Fry: A Sexistential Novel (2006)
- Diablerie (2007)
- The Tempest Tales (2008)
- The Last Days of Ptolemy Grey (2010)
- Parishioner (2012)
- Odyssey (2013)
- Debbie Doesn't Do It Anymore (2014)
- The Further Tales of Tempest Landry (2015)
- Inside a Silver Box (2015)
- John Woman (2018)
- The Awkward Black Man (2020), short stories
- Touched (2023)
- Ghalen: A Romance in Black (2026)

=== Easy Rawlins mysteries ===
- Devil in a Blue Dress (1990)
- A Red Death (1991)
- White Butterfly (1992)
- Black Betty (1994)
- A Little Yellow Dog (1996)
- Gone Fishin' (1997)
- Bad Boy Brawly Brown (2002)
- Six Easy Pieces (2003)
- Little Scarlet (2004)
- Cinnamon Kiss (2005)
- Blonde Faith (2007)
- Little Green (2013)
- Rose Gold (2014)
- Charcoal Joe (2016)
- Blood Grove (2021)
- Farewell, Amethystine (2024)
- Gray Dawn (2025)

=== Fearless Jones mysteries ===
- Fearless Jones (2001)
- Fear Itself (2003)
- Fear of the Dark (2006)

=== Leonid McGill mysteries ===
- The Long Fall (2009)
- Known to Evil (2010)
- When the Thrill Is Gone (2011)
- All I Did Was Shoot My Man (2012)
- And Sometimes I Wonder About You (2015)
- Trouble Is What I Do (2020)

=== Socrates Fortlow books ===
- Always Outnumbered, Always Outgunned (1997)
- Walkin' the Dog (1999)
- The Right Mistake (2008)

=== Crosstown to Oblivion ===
- The Gift of Fire / On the Head of a Pin (2012)
- Merge / Disciple (2012)
- Stepping Stone / The Love Machine (2013)

=== King Oliver books ===
- Down the River unto the Sea (2018)
- Every Man a King (2023)
- Been Wrong So Long It Feels Like Right (2025)
- Hanging & Burning (2026)

=== Graphic novels ===
- Maximum Fantastic Four (2005, with Stan Lee and Jack Kirby)
- The Thing: The Next Big Thing (2022, with Tom Reilly)

=== Plays ===
- The Fall of Heaven (2011)
- Lift (2014)

=== Nonfiction ===
- Workin' on the Chain Gang: Shaking off the Dead Hand of History (2000)
- What Next: An African American Initiative Toward World Peace (2003)
- Life Out of Context: Which Includes a Proposal for the Non-violent Takeover of the House of Representatives (2006)
- This Year You Write Your Novel (2007)
- Twelve Steps Toward Political Revelation (2011) ISBN 978-1-56858-642-7
- Elements of Fiction (2019)

=== Films and television ===
- Fallen Angels: Fearless (1995) (TV)
- Devil in a Blue Dress (1995) (film), associate producer
- Always Outnumbered (1998) (TV)
- "Little Brother", episode of Masters of Science Fiction (2007) (TV)
- Snowfall (TV), consulting producer (2018–2019), executive producer (2021–2023), episode writer: "Prometheus Rising" (2018), "Cash and Carry" (2019), "Blackout" (2019), "Betrayal" (2021), "All the Way Down" (2021), "Celebration" (2022), "Charnel House" (2023), and "Door of No Return" (2023)
- The Last Days of Ptolemy Grey (2022) (TV), creator, executive producer, based on his novel of the same name, episode writer: "Reggie", "Robyn", "Sensia", "Coydog", "Nina", and "Ptolemy"
- Justified: City Primeval (2023) (TV), consulting producer
- The Man in My Basement (2025) (film), co-writer, based on his novel of the same name
- The Lowdown (2025) (TV), episode writer: "Tulsa Turnaround"
