= Devil in a Blue Dress =

1990 novel by Walter Mosley

- Author: Walter Mosley
- Genre: Hardboiled mystery
- Publisher: Norton
- Publication date: 1990
- Pages: 219 pp.
- ISBN: 978-0-393-02854-6
- OCLC: 20562157

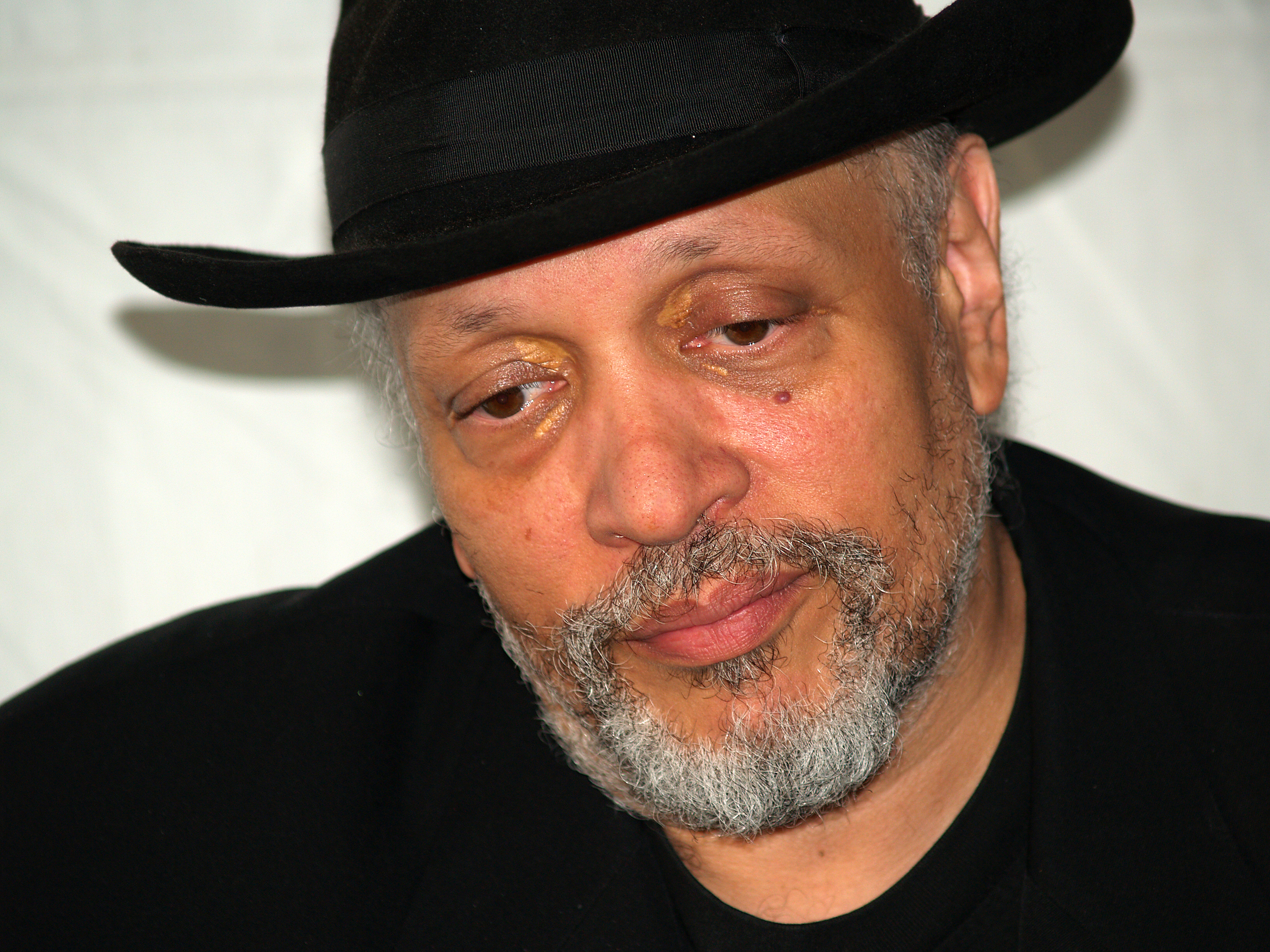
Walter Mosley at the 2007 Brooklyn Book Festival.

Devil in a Blue Dress is a 1990 hardboiled mystery novel by Walter Mosley, his first published book. The text centers on the main character, Ezekiel "Easy" Rawlins, and his transformation from a day laborer into a detective.

== Plot ==
Set in 1948, the story begins in the Watts area of Los Angeles, with Ezekiel "Easy" Rawlins, a Houstonian — from that city's Fifth Ward — who lost his job at an aviation defense plant in Los Angeles and is unable to pay the mortgage on his LA home. Easy is sitting in a bar run by Joppy, a friend who is also from Houston, when a man named DeWitt Albright walks into the bar and offers him a job finding a young White woman named Daphne Monet, who is rumored to be hanging out in bars frequented mostly by African Americans, but where White women are allowed inside.

At the bar, Easy meets two old friends, Coretta and Dupree, among many other people that he knew from his former life in Houston. Coretta says that she knows Daphne, but gives an incorrect address to Easy. He goes home with them and has sex with Coretta while Dupree is asleep in the next room. Easy then leaves her early the next morning, only to be arrested by the LAPD. Shortly thereafter, following police interrogation, Easy is told that Coretta is dead, and that he is a suspect in her murder.

When Easy finally does find Monet, he figures out that she has stolen a large amount of money from a man named Todd Carter, who is a local wealthy businessman. Albright wanted this money for himself. Eventually, Albright finds Monet through Easy, who is trying to shield the thieving woman.

Easy enlists the help of a friend and fellow Houstonian, Mouse, who shows up due to a half-hearted invitation from Easy and domestic strife back home. Easy and Mouse find Monet with Albright and Joppy, who was revealed to have killed Coretta and Howard Green, someone who had been previously beaten to death. They rescue her and kill Joppy and Albright. Then Mouse reveals that Monet is actually Ruby, an African-American woman passing as White, and the sister of a local gangster named Frank Green. Mouse and Easy blackmail Ruby, taking her money and dividing it into thirds for each of them. Daphne/Ruby leaves shortly thereafter, and Easy has to clean up the mess with the police as well as Carter, who had initially hired Albright to find her, since he really did love her and not his money.

Easy approaches Carter and requests his help with the police. He blackmails him by saying that he will leak the information about his love for a Black woman unless he is protected from the law. Carter helps him. At the conclusion, Mouse returns to Houston, Easy takes up detective work, and Ruby disappears.

== Main characters ==
- Ezekiel "Easy" Rawlins is an out-of-work African American man who has moved from Houston to Los Angeles. Easy is a war veteran and owns his own home. He is drawn into a mystery by Albright, who hires him to locate Monet, telling him that it is on behalf of a wealthy businessman named Todd Carter. Easy has no interest in life as a detective, but his tutelage under Albright encourages him to consider doing 'favors' for people as an ongoing career.
- Raymond "Mouse" Alexander is Easy's best friend, described as dangerous and deadly. Easy calls Mouse to assist him when the case becomes dangerous, but Mouse's deadly nature forces Easy to question whether this is the right decision.
- Daphne Monet is the young woman who has gone missing in the Watts neighborhood of LA; Easy is tasked with finding her, and as a result, gets caught up in the intrigue.
- DeWitt Albright is the white private investigator who hires Easy to find Monet.
- Frank Green is a criminal in the Watts neighborhood, who is known for his skills with a knife. He is connected to Monet, and a person of interest in Easy's investigation.
- Matthew Teran is a pedophile who recently dropped out of the mayor's race. He keeps a little Mexican boy as a sex slave, and is grotesque in appearance. He tries to use Daphne to get back at Carter, who forced him to withdraw his candidacy.
- Odell Jones is Easy's quiet, cautious, religious middle-aged friend. He is wont to sit at John's or Vernie's, and sip one beer all night. He is also a voice of fear, advising Easy to run away from his problems.
- Todd Carter is a well-connected white man who has a relationship with Monet. The president of Lion Investments, he is a humble-looking, weak-willed man with more money than any other character. He dated Monet until she stole $30,000 from him and vanished. He hires Albright, and later Easy, to bring Monet back to him. He also helps Easy to avoid jail time.

== Analysis ==
The novel is an important contribution to African-American and detective fiction in that it focuses on a black protagonist who falls into the role of detective, but by the series' end, has made both the profession and the identity that often comes along with it his own. Particularly noteworthy are Easy's use of African-American English and the emergence of "the Voice" (an inner voice that advises Easy during particularly stressful or dangerous situations). Literary scholars of detective fiction have explored these qualities by means of genre study approaches.

== Reception ==
First published by W.W. Norton in 1990, Devil In a Blue Dress won the 1991 Shamus Award in the category of "Best First P. I. Novel".

Herbert Mitgang of The New York Times described it as "a little overplotted" but believed it "mark[ed] the debut of a talented author with something vital to say about the distance between the black and white worlds" and looked forward to the next book.

== Adaptations ==
Devil In a Blue Dress was adapted into a 1995 film of the same name, which starred Denzel Washington as Easy Rawlins, and also featured Jennifer Beals, Tom Sizemore, Maury Chaykin, as well as Don Cheadle as the unhinged "Mouse".

In 1996, a 10-part abridgement by Margaret Busby, read by Paul Winfield, was broadcast on BBC Radio 4, starting on April 1.
