= Ezekiel "Easy" Rawlins =

Fictional private detective created by Walter Mosley

- First appearance: Devil in a Blue Dress
- Created by: Walter Mosley
- Portrayed by: Denzel Washington; Clarke Peters

In-universe information
- Gender: Male
- Occupation: Private detective
- Children: Jesus; Feather; Edna
- Nationality: American

Ezekiel "Easy" Porterhouse Rawlins is a fictional character created by the American novelist Walter Mosley. Rawlins is a half African-American private investigator, a hard-boiled detective, and World War II veteran living in the Watts neighborhood of Los Angeles. He is featured in a series of best-selling mysteries set from the 1940s to the 1960s.

The mysteries combine traditional conventions of detective fiction with descriptions of racial inequities and social injustice experienced by African Americans and other persons of color in the Los Angeles of that period. While Rawlins is clearly in the tradition of Raymond Chandler's Philip Marlowe and Ross Macdonald's Lew Archer, he differs sharply from these earlier fictional detectives in that Rawlins is an unlicensed private investigator (though he acquires a license late in the series) with no background or training in law enforcement.

Mosley has written sixteen novels and a collection of short stories featuring Rawlins, his most popular character. He originally featured Rawlins in a novella called Gone Fishin', but it was rejected by several publishers because they didn't think that there was a market for books about black men. When Mosley rewrote the story as a detective novel, he found a publisher.

Mosley once stated he intended to bring the character into contemporary times, but later said the 2007 novel Blonde Faith, which is set in 1967, would be the last. Nevertheless, in 2013 a new Easy Rawlins novel entitled Little Green was published, followed by Rose Gold (2014), Charcoal Joe (2016), Blood Grove (2021), Farewell, Amethystine (2024), and Gray Dawn (2025).

== Character biography ==
Easy Rawlins was born on November 3, 1920, in New Iberia, Louisiana. His mother died when he was eight years old; soon afterward his father fled to escape lynching after fighting with a white man. The fight was the result of a dispute with his father's supervisor over earnings. Easy had accompanied his father to his job at the slaughterhouse and saw his father argue with the man. When the man called his father the N-word, his father punched him. After the scuffle, Easy and his father ran off, with his father kissing Easy one last time, and telling him to go home. Easy never found out what became of him.

Easy's older half-brother and half-sister went to live with cousins in El Paso while Easy was taken in by his mother's brother-in-law, a violent man named Skyles. After a few weeks, Easy ran away from Skyles's farm and spent the rest of his childhood and adolescence living on his own in the Fifth Ward of Houston, Texas. After accompanying his friend Raymond ("Mouse") to Pariah, which resulted in the death of Mouse's stepfather, Easy decided to leave Houston to move to Dallas, Texas. He lived there a short while before enlisting in the armed forces. During World War II he served in the U.S. Army, fighting in North Africa, Italy, and finally, the Battle of the Bulge under George S. Patton and Omar Bradley; after the war, he moved to Los Angeles where he purchased his first home and worked at an aircraft assembly plant. Easy got into his own dispute with his supervisor at the Champion aircraft assembly plant. He was asked to stay behind after his shift, but felt tired, and did not trust his ability to check his work. Easy was fired for not remaining to complete the work. Concerns about his unemployment and mortgage payments influenced him to take up his first case as an amateur private investigator.

== Bibliography ==
=== Devil in a Blue Dress, 1990 ===
Set in 1948, Devil in a Blue Dress introduces Easy Rawlins, a newly unemployed factory worker, let go from his job building aircraft because his white supervisor found him "uppity". Needing money to pay his mortgage, Easy agrees to search for Daphne Monet, the missing mistress of a wealthy white politician. No one is willing to tell Easy just why so many people want to find Daphne, and the trail leads him through the intersection of crime, corruption, and race politics in Los Angeles. In the course of the search Easy reunites with a childhood friend, Raymond "Mouse" Alexander, a charming but conscienceless stone-cold killer, recently arrived in LA from Houston. The events of the book set Easy on his new career as a trader in outside-the-law "favors".

The book was adapted into a 1995 film of the same name, which starred Denzel Washington as Easy Rawlins, and also featured Jennifer Beals, Tom Sizemore, Maury Chaykin, and Don Cheadle as the unhinged "Mouse".

=== A Red Death, 1991 ===
Set in 1953. With the money he made in Devil in a Blue Dress, Easy has become a landlord. He owns several apartment buildings in Los Angeles, running them through a hired front man while he works as the buildings' handyman and janitor. As the book opens, Easy is audited by the IRS, a problem because he cannot account for how he came to own his property in the first place (because the money with which he bought his first building was stolen). Darryl T. Craxton, an agent of the Federal Bureau of Investigation, offers to get him out of trouble with the IRS on the condition that Easy investigate an espionage problem at a major aircraft manufacturer. Craxton also wants to prove that labor union organizer Chaim Wenzler is a communist spy. Easy reluctantly agrees, and the job brings him into conflict with several old friends and his own conscience.

=== White Butterfly, 1992 ===
Set in 1956. Easy is married and living in a house in Los Angeles with his wife, their baby daughter, and their adopted son Jesus. A black Los Angeles Police Department detective named Quinten Naylor reluctantly taps Easy to investigate a murder spree: four women have been killed, apparently by a serial killer. Easy resents that the LAPD has only started investigating for real because the fourth victim is white. Easy solves the murders despite pressure from the fourth victim's parents, who don't want it known that their daughter had a child with a black man.

=== Black Betty, 1994 ===
Set in 1961. Now divorced, Easy lives in a rented house in LA with his adopted son Jesus and adopted daughter Feather. Easy is pressed for cash because most of his money is tied up in a real estate deal, which he's running through a front because he doesn't want any white investors to know that the primary stakeholder is black. He's approached by a white private detective to help search for a missing black woman, an older woman that Easy once had an adolescent crush on, during his youth in Texas. Needing the money he takes the job, and he tracks the woman into a tangled mire of wills and inheritance and questions of who's really related to whom. At the same time Easy has to rein in his murderous friend Mouse, who has just been released after serving five years in prison for manslaughter; not knowing who called the police on him, Mouse has decided simply to kill everyone who might have done it. Easy manages to sort out the missing-person case and stop Mouse from killing half the neighborhood, but he loses his real-estate investment when his agent sells him out to a group of rich white men.

=== A Little Yellow Dog, 1996 ===
Set in November 1963. Easy, concerned for his adopted children's future, has given up his career as an outside-the-law "fixer" and secured a state job with a pension, working as the supervisor of the janitorial staff at Sojourner Truth Junior High School. One of the teachers at the school turns out to be involved in a heroin-smuggling/theft operation run out of the school property, which leads to several murders; an overzealous rookie detective suspects Easy of being involved, and Easy sets out to solve the murders, break up the ring, and get himself out of trouble. In the course of the job he meets Bonnie Shay, a flight attendant unwillingly involved in smuggling, and they start dating. At the climax Easy's friend Mouse appears to be mortally wounded, but Mouse's wife EttaMae carries him out of the hospital over her shoulder and disappears.

=== Gone Fishin’, 1997 ===
Set in 1939. Easy, nineteen years old, joins his friend Mouse on a journey from Houston to Mouse's tiny home town of Pariah to confront Mouse's abusive stepfather Reese, a journey that gives Easy his first encounter with murder. (The plot is described briefly in Devil in a Blue Dress.) The story begins with Mouse asking Easy for a ride to Pariah. At the time Easy lives in a small apartment and is doing gardening work in Houston. Mouse is planning his wedding to Etta Mae, and is in need of money. He decides to get the money from his abusive stepfather Reese Corn. Easy agrees to drive Mouse for $15 in a car borrowed from a friend. On the drive, Easy and Mouse meet Clifton and Earnestine, who are hitchhiking, with the intent to go to New Orleans. Clifton is on the run after beating up a man in Houston. In the small town of Pariah Easy meets many of the people who made Mouse who he is, including the witch Mamma Jo, her hunchback son Domaque Jr, the Blues musician Sweet William (who may have been Mouses's biological father), and many other colorful characters. Easy becomes jealous of the hunchback Domaque's ability to read and recite the bible. This leads to Easy deciding to learn to read better himself. Easy and Mouse are separate for much of Easy's time there, with Easy getting sick and needing to be healed by Mamma Jo. While recovering Easy sees Clifton again, who has been living outside, on the run from the law. With assistance from Mamma Jo Easy gets better in enough time to try to stop Mouse's plan to bring violence to his stepfather, but the events of this trip haunt him. Following this adventure, he remains in Houston long enough to attend Mouse's wedding as his best man, but the next day he gets on a train to Dallas and leaves Houston behind. Not six months after that Easy enlists in the US Army and fights in World War II. Easy recalls the tale while on leave in Paris.

The novel is not strictly speaking a mystery, but rather a Bildungsroman, or coming-of-age story. Pariah is also the home of several characters who appear in other Rawlins stories, such as Momma Jo the witch and Sweet William the blues musician.

=== Bad Boy Brawly Brown, 2002 ===
Maybe there's some white man somewhere think he don't have to skip out now and then, but a black man anywhere in these United States better be able to run a mile and then another one.

— Easy Rawlins

Set in early 1964. Three months after the events of A Little Yellow Dog, Easy is haunted by grief and guilt over the apparent shooting death of his friend Mouse, and without closure since Mouse's wife took his body from the hospital and disappeared, so Easy clings to an ephemeral hope that Mouse might not be dead. Bonnie Shay has moved in with Easy and his children. Easy's old friend John asks him to look for his stepson, Brawly Brown, a young man in his early twenties, hugely strong but immature, who has left home after an argument with his mother. Easy goes to a meeting of the First Men, a black power group Brawly belongs to; the police raid the meeting, and though Easy escapes out the back, he now finds himself under investigation by covert federal agents; he also discovers that some of the more militant First Men, including Brawly, are involved in arms dealing and planning a payroll robbery. After nearly passing out when running for his life from an ambush, Easy decides to give up smoking.

=== Six Easy Pieces, 2003 ===
Set in late 1964. Nearly a year after his friend Mouse's apparent death, Easy is determined to find out if Mouse is alive, or, if not, where his grave is. The seven short stories in the book are connected by the threads of Easy's search for news of Mouse and his own growing dissatisfaction with the predictability of his workaday life as a head custodian. Easy looks into cases of arson, missing persons, and murder, and we learn he has formed a relationship of wary mutual respect with Sergeant Andre Brown, a black LAPD officer, and that Momma Jo the witch (last seen in Gone Fishin' ) has moved to the LA area from Texas. Easy is unsettled by his girlfriend Bonnie's acquaintance with African princes and civil rights activists and other people who are working to change the world; perhaps in response, he rents an office and takes steps toward setting up his own investigation business.

=== Little Scarlet, 2004 ===
[It] was the first piece of solid evidence I had that the white man's grip on my throat was losing strength.

— Easy Rawlins

Set in August 1965. In the aftermath of the Watts Riots, a white detective named Melvin Suggs seeks out Easy at his office. Suggs tells Easy he wants him to investigate the murder of a black woman named Nola Payne, whose nickname was "little Scarlet" because of her reddish hair. Nola had taken in a white driver who was fleeing from a carjacking; she was found strangled and shot in her apartment, and both her aunt and the police suspect the driver. The LAPD has kept the murder out of the news, and the deputy commissioner asks Easy to find the driver without triggering another outburst of violence. Easy agrees, but he refuses payment for the pleasure of standing up to the police.

=== Cinnamon Kiss, 2005 ===
I knew that if I had been twenty years younger, I would have been a hippie too.

— Easy Rawlins

Set in April 1966. Easy is now a legitimate private investigator, the city of LA having given him a license in recognition of the work he did in Little Scarlet. As the book opens, Easy takes a leave of absence from his job as a head custodian in the LAUSD, because he is desperate to find money for the treatment of his daughter Feather, who has a life-threatening blood infection. He seriously considers joining his friend Mouse in a payroll robbery in Texas, but his old friend and fellow detective Saul Lynx brings him a high-paying job. On behalf of an eccentric private investigator named Robert E. Lee, Easy sets out to find Philomena "Cinnamon" Cargill, the black assistant of a white public-aid lawyer who has gone missing after discovering proof that his family's law firm had secret dealings with the Nazis during World War II. The case takes him to Haight-Ashbury and Easy has his first encounter with the counterculture.

=== Blonde Faith, 2007 ===
Set in February 1967. Easy has not returned to his job at Sojourner Truth Junior High School, instead doing detective work full-time. He and Bonnie Shay have separated, and he remains living with his now 11-year-old daughter Feather, who has recovered from her illness. His son Jesus now lives in Venice with his girlfriend Benita and baby daughter Essie. Easy returns home one day to find that his friend Christmas Black, a former Green Beret, has left his eight-year-old daughter in Easy's care. Knowing this means Christmas is in trouble, Easy investigates and comes up against former servicemen who smuggled drugs in Vietnam; this soon leads to his needing to clear his childhood friend Mouse of murder. The novel ends with a car crash, with Easy's fate unresolved, because the author hadn't decided whether he wanted to write another Rawlins novel.

=== Little Green, 2013 ===
Set in April 1967. Two months after his car crash at the end of Blonde Faith, Easy wakens from a semi-coma. His friend Mouse asks him to find a young man named Evander Noon, whom Mouse calls "Little Green"; Evander was unknowingly given LSD at a party and wandered off and disappeared during his subsequent hallucinations. Easy's search sends him into the heart of the LA counterculture, where he takes stock of how much America has changed since his own youth. He finds Evander, but also finds trouble. Evander has no memory of his acid trip, but he came out of it covered in someone else's blood and holding a big bag of money, also covered in blood. Easy must sort out what happened, while also defending his friend Jackson from extortion and preventing trouble between Evander and Mouse, and at the same time recovering from his injuries and trying to reconnect with Bonnie Shay.

=== Rose Gold, 2014 ===
Set in July 1967. Three months after the events of Little Green, Easy has bought a new house in West LA. As he is moving in, a senior LAPD officer asks him to take on a case: college student Rosemary Goldsmith has gone missing from her dorm at UC Santa Barbara, and a man has called her wealthy father demanding a large ransom...but the father suspects his leftist daughter may actually be trying to take the money he makes from manufacturing napalm and give it to revolutionary causes. The police suspect a black former boxer named Mantle, who has also gone missing, and they put pressure on Easy to investigate, including sending city inspectors to demand large-scale renovations on Easy's real estate holdings, which will cost more money than he has. Easy, though growing doubtful of his own effectiveness as a private eye, takes the case. Mantle, calling himself Uhuru Nolicé, is a revolutionary, and while investigating him Easy runs afoul of the FBI and the US State Department, both of whom seem to be targeting Mantle with false charges; Easy must find out what really happened while avoiding threats from law enforcement and also helping his friends Melvin and EttaMae with their own problems.

=== Charcoal Joe, 2016 ===
Set in May 1968. Easy has formed a partnership with fellow detectives Saul Lynx and “Whisper” Natly, and moved his office from Watts to West LA. His son Jesus has moved to Alaska with his wife and daughter to work in the fishing industry; his daughter Feather is now attending a private high school, the fees paid with the money Easy made in Rose Gold, while Easy prepares to propose to his girlfriend Bonnie. Easy's friend Mouse asks him to take a case on behalf of "Charcoal Joe", a crime boss currently serving a jail term. The LA police have pinned a double murder on a young black physicist named Braithwaite, and Joe wants Easy to clear him. The case sets Easy following a trail of bodies in the wake of missing Mafia money.

=== Gray Dawn, 2025 ===
Set in 1971. Easy is in a fulfilling romantic relationship with Amethystine “Amy” Stoller, his business is thriving, and he is living rent-free in a privately patrolled mountaintop home. However, he feels discontented, and the world continues to view him as a threat due to his race. When Santangelo Burris asks him to find his missing aunt, Lutisha James, Easy takes the case despite it having been over a year since his last case, and with little to go on beyond a suspicion that Lutisha James may be gambling. The job takes him to Bel Air, where he finds three dead bodies and a terrified nine-year-old girl in a house that was one of Lutisha’s last-known whereabouts. When Easy stumbles across another homicide, he finds himself arrested and taken to county jail, where he agrees to help an inmate find his missing father. As he finds out Lutisha is more dangerous than suspected, Jesus must evade corrupt federal agents and Easy must figure out a way to save him from prison. Easy must also help Niska Redman, a young black woman working as his secretary, develop into a detective as she takes on her own missing-persons case.

== Adaptations ==
=== Film and radio ===
The character was played by Denzel Washington in Easy's first and (as of 2024) only on-screen appearance, the 1995 film adaptation of Devil in a Blue Dress. Clarke Peters played Rawlins in a 1997 BBC radio dramatization of Black Betty.

=== Attempted television projects ===
Over the years there have been several announcements of Easy Rawlins projects that have failed to reach production. In 2006, it was announced that HBO Films had acquired the rights to Mosley's 2004 novel Little Scarlet for a feature starring Jeffrey Wright as Easy, and rapper/actor Mos Def as Mouse. In 2011, NBC announced it was developing an Easy Rawlins project. In 2012 Mosley told the Los Angeles Times that NBC passed on his script. In 2016, filmmaker Josh Boone announced that he was adapting the series for a television series on FX. In 2021, it was announced that Amblin Television would create a series, with Mosley and Sylvain White attached as executive producers.
