= Futureland =

Short story collection by Walter Mosley

- Author: Walter Mosley
- Publisher: Random House
- Publication date: November 12, 2001
- Pages: 368

Futureland is a series of nine loosely connected short pieces of science fiction by writer Walter Mosley. The novel is set in a postcyberpunk dystopian universe populated by humans living in a shellshocked, unfairly stratified society overseen by super-rich technocrats.

A generation from now, things aren't much different from today: The drugs are better, the daily grind is worse. The world's knowledge fits on a chip in your little finger, the Constitution doesn't apply to individuals, and it's a crime to be poor.

— Walter Mosley, Warner Books 2001

== Stories ==
Whispers in the Dark - Introduces the early life of one Ptolemy Bent, a young black child who has the greatest IQ the world has ever known, and the purest heart possible in the world he is born into. Because of his IQ, the government wants to take him away from his family to give him education. To prevent this, his uncle sells his organs in order to afford proper education for Ptolemy (known as Popo). The book ends with Ptolemy uploading the digital consciousness of his grandmother and uncle into radio waves as they were both sick. This section ends with him being sent to jail.

The Greatest - Fera Jones rises to the challenge and becomes the first female Universal Boxing Authority World Champion. Along the way, she endures the stress of a risky operation for her father and trainer, Leon Jones, who is addicted to the lethal fantasy-dream drug pulse, which inevitably kills the user as the brain degrades. Pell Lightner, a young man born to permanently unemployed parents, takes up the role of her coach, and gets her through the toughest match of her career.

Doctor Kismet - An interview between the CEO of MacroCode International, the world's most powerful corporation, and one of the leaders of the Sixth Radical Congress, a movement to strengthen the positions of African-Americans in world society.

Angel's Island - The tale of a prisoner on the world's largest privately owned prison and how he came to expose its dark secrets.

The Electric Eye - Folio Johnson is the lead in this more traditional detective following the "last private detective in New York". Folio is hired to investigate the mysterious deaths of members of an elite Neo-Fascists think tank group known as the International Socialists, "The Itsies".

Voices - Professor Jones (Fera Jones', from 'The Greatest', father) hears voices in his head after undergoing a brain tissue transplant. His doctor reassures him that it is simply the foreign tissue becoming part of him. Jones meets a little girl in a park who he shows a fatherly affection for, however her existence is eerie. Similar scenes play out throughout the story, making him question what is real and what are dreams, maybe even echoes of his past drug addiction.

Little Brother - Frendon Blythe is a young activist, who must stand courtroom trial for the death of a policeman in Common Ground, where the defendant can afford neither an attorney nor a judge. He is thus tried and matches wits with a judicial automaton programmed with the minds of 10,000 legal experts, trying to win the sympathy of an AI jury of 10,000 digital consciousnesses.

En Masse - Neil Hawthorne, a young man living in a future New York City, works as a "prod," a job which sends him into nervous panic attacks–these panic attacks could get him diagnosed with acute Labor Nervosa, losing him his job and sending him into permanent unemployment. Then, Neil is suddenly assigned to the GEE-PRO-9 program. With an amazing view of the East River, lax rules, and stimulating development projects, this new program makes Neil immediately suspicious; he becomes anxious that his management is testing him.

The Nig in Me- A biochemically engineered disease–meant for coloured people by the white supremacist technocrats, but sabotaged by a team of activists in En Masse–ravages the world. The only people who are spared are those with "at least 12.5% African DNA."

== See also ==
- African American literature
- Africanfuturism
- Afrofuturism
